= Cities, towns and locations in Bardhaman district =

The cities, towns and locations in Bardhaman district, a former district in West Bengal, India, are divided among six subdivisions, which contain 2 municipal corporations, 9 municipalities and 31 community development blocks. The community development blocks in turn contain census towns and out-growths, as well as rural areas. Bardhaman district has 70 official urban units and many other smaller towns and villages. As of 2001 the total population was 6,919,698, of which 4,347,275 was rural and 2,572,423 was urban. The total area was 7,024 square kilometres (2,712 sq mi) of which 6,230 square kilometres (2,410 sq mi) was rural and 794 square kilometres (307 sq mi) was urban.

== Subdivisions ==
Subdivisions contain Municipal Corporations and Municipalities, classified as urban, and predominantly rural community development blocks. The subdivisions as of 2001 were:

Subdivision	Municipal Wards	Villages	Households
Asansol	128	168	277,977
Bardhaman Sadar North	51	498	259,186
Bardhaman Sadar South	16	626	219,220
Durgapur	43	248	263,447
Kalna	18	528	202,170
Katwa	33	370	169,072
Total	289	2,438	1,390,072

== Community development blocks and municipal areas ==
Subdivisions are divided into community development blocks and municipal areas (M). Community development blocks contain Census Towns and Out Growths, which are classified as urban, and rural areas. The community development blocks and municipal areas as of 2001 were:

Subdivision	Block or municipal area	Area km^{2}	Population	Rural Area km^{2}	Rural population
Durgapur	Andal (or Ondal)	84.78	168,807	39.32	41,413
Bardhaman Sadar North	Ausgram I	164.50	106,813	164.50	106,813
Bardhaman Sadar North	Ausgram II	354.00	136,235	354.00	136,235
Asansol	Barabani	150.50	110,361	142.54	91,660
Bardhaman Sadar North	Bhatar	414.40	236,397	414.40	236,397
Bardhaman Sadar North	Burdwan I	250.41	179,774	250.41	179,774
Bardhaman Sadar North	Burdwan II	179.14	138,909	179.14	138,909
Durgapur	Faridpur-Durgapur	144.60	108,619	129.89	89,010
Durgapur	Galsi I	287.70	174,070	283.13	162,285
Bardhaman Sadar North	Galsi II	277.90	133,951	277.90	133,951
Bardhaman Sadar South	Jamalpur	267.88	243,474	267.88	243,474
Asansol	Jamuria	145.86	112,799	130.24	84,182
Kalna	Kalna I	161.34	190,687	157.13	174,106
Kalna	Kalna II	185.32	152,853	185.32	152,853
Durgapur	Kanksa	270.78	151,255	258.66	120,463
Katwa	Katwa I	169.91	152,066	168.88	146,401
Katwa	Katwa II	164.45	120,314	164.45	120,314
Katwa	Ketugram I	189.86	146,013	189.86	146,013
Katwa	Ketugram II	165.24	107,011	165.24	107,011
Bardhaman Sadar South	Khandaghosh	256.13	170,310	256.13	170,310
Kalna	Manteswar	305.40	213,262	305.40	213,262
Bardhaman Sadar South	Memari I	200.76	198,152	200.76	198,152
Bardhaman Sadar South	Memari II	185.13	135,621	185.13	135,621
Katwa	Mongalkote	364.90	233,944	364.90	233,944
Durgapur	Pandabeswar	97.89	146,445	36.42	37,709
Kalna	Purbasthali I	146.91	183,041	138.42	154,168
Kalna	Purbasthali II	188.18	188,149	184.70	183,698
Bardhaman Sadar South	Raina I	266.44	162,921	266.44	162,921
Bardhaman Sadar South	Raina II	222.40	137,458	222.40	137,458
Asansol	Raniganj	41.47	101,678	7.94	24,372
Asansol	Salanpur	109.86	156,338	84.80	84,396
Asansol	Asansol (MC)	127.87	486,304		
Bardhaman Sadar North	Bardhaman (M)	23.04	285,871		
Katwa	Dainhat (M)	10.36	22,593		
Durgapur	Durgapur (MC)	154.20	492,996		
Bardhaman Sadar North	Guskara (M)	21.15	31,863		
Asansol	Jamuria (M)	73.23	129,456		
Kalna	Kalna (M)	6.40	52,176		
Katwa	Katwa (M)	8.53	71,573		
Asansol	Kulti (M)	99.57	290,057		
Bardhaman Sadar South	Memari (M)	8.77	36,191		
Asansol	Raniganj (M)	23.44	122,891		
	Total	7,024.00	6,919,698	6,229.73	4,347,275

== Urban units ==
Urban units include Municipal Corporations (MC), Municipalities (M), Census Towns (CT) and Out Growths (OG), As of 2001 they were:

Subdivision	Block	Urban Unit	Type	Area km^{2}	Population
Asansol	Raniganj	Amkula	CT	3.01	5,936
Durgapur	Andal	Andal	CT	2.77	19,504
Asansol	Asansol (MC)	Asansol	MC	127.87	486,304
Durgapur	Pandabeswar	Bahula	CT	3.59	16,264
Asansol	Raniganj	Ballavpur	CT	1.67	5,391
Asansol	Raniganj	Banshra	CT	3.01	5,128
Bardhaman Sadar North	Bardhaman (M)	Bardhaman	M	23.04	285,871
Durgapur	Andal	Baska	CT	1.95	4,980
Asansol	Raniganj	Belebathan	CT	2.95	4,292
Asansol	Barabani	Bhanowara	CT	4.11	7,732
Durgapur	Pandabeswar	Bilpahari	CT	4.08	7,786
Durgapur	Andal /Pandabeswar	Chak Bankola	CT	1.78	10,318
Asansol	Raniganj	Chapui	CT	1.18	5,185
Asansol	Barabani	Charanpur	OG	2.63	3,301
Asansol	Raniganj	Chelad	CT	3.93	7,901
Durgapur	Pandabeswar	Chhora	CT	5.64	12,839
Asansol	Salanpur	Chittaranjan	CT	19.65	45,925
Katwa	Dainhat (M)	Dainhat	M	10.36	22,593
Durgapur	Pandabeswar	Dalurband	CT	7.95	14,978
Durgapur	Kanksa	Debipur	CT	0.87	9,115
Durgapur	Andal	Dhandadihi	CT	3.49	3,843
Kalna	Kalna-I	Dhatrigram	CT	2.60	9,609
Durgapur	Andal	Dignala	CT	3.64	12,510
Durgapur	Durgapur (MC)	Durgapur	MC	154.20	492,996
Asansol	Raniganj	Egara	OG	3.66	5,710
Kalna	Purbasthali-I	Gopinathpur	CT	1.89	4,983
Bardhaman Sadar North	Guskara (M)	Guskara	M	21.15	31,863
Durgapur	Pandabeswar	Haripur	CT	2.50	6,888
Durgapur	Andal	Harishpur	CT	2.44	8,401
Kalna	Purbasthali-I	Hatsimla	CT	2.17	6,175
Asansol	Salanpur	Hindusthan Cables Town	CT	3.90	22,152
Asansol	Jamuria (M)	Jamuria	M	73.23	129,456
Asansol	Salanpur	Jemari	CT	1.51	3,865
Asansol	Raniganj	Jemari (J.K. Nagar Township)	CT	4.24	14,087
Durgapur	Andal	Kajora	CT	10.33	24,955
Kalna	Kalna (M)	Kalna	M	6.40	52,176
Durgapur	Kanksa	Kanksa	CT	8.66	16,528
Katwa	Katwa (M)	Katwa	M	8.53	71,573
Asansol	Jamuria	Kenda	CT	7.95	14,517
Durgapur	Pandabeswar	Kendra Khottamdi	CT	8.26	7,090
Durgapur	Andal	Khandra	CT	7.49	13,490
Durgapur	Pandabeswar	Konardihi	CT	7.11	8,248
Asansol	Kulti (M)	Kulti	M	99.57	290,057
Asansol	Jamuria	Kunustara	CT	3.18	5,415
Durgapur	Andal	Mahira	CT	1.34	4,492
Durgapur	Durgapur-Faridpur	Mandarbani	CT	3.87	5,497
Bardhaman Sadar South	Memari (M)	Memari	M	8.77	36,191
Asansol	Raniganj	Murgathaul	CT	2.12	7,872
Durgapur	Pandabeswar	Nabgram	CT	4.51	4,643
Asansol	Raniganj	Nimeha	OG	3.85	1,793
Durgapur	Andal	Palashban	CT	2.83	4,856
Asansol	Barabani	Pangachhiya	CT	1.22	7,668
Katwa	Katwa	Panuhat	CT	1.03	5,665
Durgapur	Andal /Pandabeswar	Parashkol	CT	6.80	10,989
Asansol	Jamuria	Parasia	CT	4.49	8,684
Kalna	Purbasthali-II	Patuli	CT	3.48	4,451
Durgapur	Kanksa	Prayagpur	CT	2.59	5,149
Asansol	Raniganj	Raghunathchak	CT	0.87	5,477
Durgapur	Pandabeswar	Ramnagar, Ramnagar	CT	5.94	4,926
Asansol	Raniganj (M)	Raniganj	M	23.44	122,891
Asansol	Raniganj	Ratibati	CT	1.38	4,370
Asansol	Raniganj	Sahebganj	OG	1.66	4,164
Durgapur	Pandabeswar	Sankarpur	CT	3.31	5,921
Durgapur	Durgapur-Faridpur	Sarpi	CT	5.43	8,897
Durgapur	Andal	Siduli	CT	1.85	8,341
Durgapur	Durgapur-Faridpur	Sirsha	CT	5.41	5,215
Kalna	Purbasthali-I	Srirampur	CT	4.43	17,715
Durgapur	Galsi-I	Sukdal	CT	4.57	11,785
Durgapur	Andal	Ukhra	CT	7.33	19,868
Kalna	Kalna-I	Uttar Goara	CT	1.61	6,972
		Total		794.27	2,572,423

== Other locations ==
Subdivision	Location	Notes
Asansol	Barakar	Small town and trade center
Asansol	Churulia	Village under Jamuria block, birthplace of the poet Kazi Nazrul Islam.
Asansol	Dihika	Village where Paramahansa Yogananda set up a "How-to-Live" school
Asansol	Dishergarh	Small town
Bardhaman Sadar North	Dwariapur	Village of Ausgram I block
Asansol	Ethora	Village - site of first commercial coal extraction in India
Bardhaman Sadar South	Masagram	Village of Jamalpur block
Kalna	Monteswar	Village
Bardhaman Sadar South	Nabagram	Village with railway station of Jamalpur block
Kalna	Nadanghat	Village and police station
Asansol	Neamatpur	Small town
Bardhaman Sadar South	Palsit	Small town
Kalna	Purbasthali	Village with police station
Asansol	Ramnagar	Colliery town near Kulti
Durgapur	Randiha	Location of the Anderson weir
Bardhaman Sadar South	Saktigarh	Town with railway station
Asansol	Sitarampur	Small town, early hub of coal mining
Durgapur	Waria	Railway station

Other villages include Amgoria, Badulia, Bamshore, Channa village, Charanpur, Gangpur, Gonna Serandi, Jhamatpur, Kaigram, Kasba, Kuara, Kumirkola, Majida, Muidhara, Pahalanpur, Paharhati, Palitpur, Panchula, Putsuri, Routhgram, Sankari, Srikhanda, Uchalan and Udaypur Kalna Burdwan.
