= Hasanhati =

- Village
- Location in West Bengal, India Hasanhati (India)
- Country: India
- State: West Bengal
- District: Purba Bardhaman
- Elevation: 12 m (39 ft)

Population (2011)
  - Total: 1,475

Languages
  - Official: Bengali, English
- Time zone: UTC+5:30 (IST)
- PIN: 713122
- Telephone code: 03454

Hasanhati is a village in Kalna II CD block in Kalna subdivision of Purba Bardhaman district in West Bengal, India.

== Geography ==
It is surrounded by the villages named Udaypur, Mirhat, Amdabad, Ramnagar, Narkeldanga, Baidyapur, etc.

A river named Behula flows beside it.

== Demographics ==
As per the 2011 Census of India Hasanhati had a total population of 1,475, of which 738 (50%) were males and 737 (50%) were females. Population below 6 years was 159. The total number of literates in Hasanhati was 972 (73.86% of the population over 6 years).

== Transport ==
Bainchigram and Boinchi are the nearest railway stations to Baidyapur, whilst Kalna is 17 km away, however the nearest major railway station is at Bardhaman, 44 km away.

== Education ==
There is one Primary School in the village. Its name is Hasanhati Tulsidas Primary School.
