= Rangapara, Kalna =

Rangpara
- Village
- Location in West Bengal, India Rangpara (India)
- Coordinates: 23°13′55.0″N 88°20′27.0″E
- Country: India
- State: West Bengal
- District: Purba Bardhaman

Population (2011)
  - Total: 3,435

Languages
  - Official: Bengali, English
- Time zone: UTC+5:30 (IST)
- PIN: 713409 (Kalna)
- Telephone/STD code: 03454
- Lok Sabha constituency: Bardhaman Purba
- Vidhan Sabha constituency: Kalna
- Website: bardhaman.gov.in

Rangpara is a village in Kalna I CD block in Kalna subdivision of Purba Bardhaman district in the state of West Bengal, India.

== Geography ==
Cities and towns in the Kalna subdivision of Purba Bardhaman district
M: municipal city/ town, CT: census town, R: rural/ urban centre, H: historical/ religious cetre, C: craft centre.
Owing to space constraints in the small map, the actual locations in a larger map may vary slightly

=== CD block HQ ===
The headquarters of Kalna I CD block are located at Rangpara.

=== Urbanisation ===
87.00% of the population of Kalna subdivision live in the rural areas. Only 13.00% of the population live in the urban areas. The map alongside presents some of the notable locations in the subdivision. All places marked in the map are linked in the larger full screen map.

== Demographics ==
As per the 2011 Census of India Rangpara had a total population of 3,435, of which 1,747 (51%) were males and 1,688 (49%) were females. Population below 6 years was 272. The total number of literates in Rangpara was 2,644 (83.59% of the population over 6 years).

== Transport ==
The State Highway 6 (West Bengal), running from Rajnagar (in Birbhum district) to Alampur (in Howrah district), passes through Rangpara.
