= Monteswar =

- Village
- Location within West Bengal
- Coordinates: 23°25′21″N 88°06′27″E
- Country: India
- State: West Bengal
- District: Purba Bardhaman
- Parliamentary constituency: Bardhaman-Durgapur
- State Assembly constituency: Manteswar

Population (2011)
  - Total: 9,331
- PIN: 713145 (Manteswar)
- Telephone/STD code: 03453
- Website: www.bardhaman.gov.in

Monteswar is a village situated in Manteswar CD block in Kalna subdivision of Purba Bardhaman district in the Indian state of West Bengal.

== History ==
Most of the area between the Damodar and the Ajay, largely covering the later day Shergarh, Selimpur and Senpahari parganas, was broadly known as Gopbhum, where the Sadgop kings ruled for a long time, prior to the advent of the Muslims. They ruled from Amrargar and branched out to Bharatpur (on the bank of the Damodar) and Kanksa. The Sura kings occupy a somewhat mythical position in the region. It is estimated that they ruled between the late 4th century to around 11th century. They were believed to be based in Singheswar (in the northern Rarh region) and Gar Mandaran. One branch of the family was based in what is now Purba Bardhaman district. The capital of Bhu Sura, son of the legendary Adi Sura, was located at Surnagar or Surogram in the Monteswar police station area.

See also - Gourangapur for information on Ichhai Ghosh

== Geography ==
Cities and towns in the Kalna subdivision of Purba Bardhaman district
M: municipal city/ town, CT: census town, R: rural/ urban centre, H: historical/ religious centre, C: craft centre.
Owing to space constraints in the small map, the actual locations in a larger map may vary slightly

=== Physiography ===
Monteswar is a part of the flat alluvial and occasionally flood-prone Bardhaman Plain, the central plain area of the district.

=== Police station ===
Monteswar police station has jurisdiction over Manteswar CD Block. The area covered is 354.04 km^{2}.

When subdivisions were first formed by the British in 1860, Manteswar was one of the police stations of Kalna subdivision. It is also mentioned in Peterson's District Gazetteer of 1910.

=== CD block HQ ===
The headquarters of Manteswar CD block are located at Monteswar.

=== Urbanisation ===
87.00% of the population of Kalna subdivision live in the rural areas. Only 13.00% of the population live in the urban areas. The map alongside presents some of the notable locations in the subdivision. All places marked in the map are linked in the larger full screen map.

== Demographics ==
As per the 2011 Census of India Monteswar had a total population of 9,331, of which 4,731 (51%) were males and 4,600 (49%) were females. Population below 6 years was 923. The total number of literates in Monteswar was 6,759 (80.39% of the population over 6 years).

== Transport ==
State Highway 15 running from Dainhat (in Purba Bardhaman district) to Gadiara (in Howrah district) passes through this block.

A bridge is located between Maldanga and Monteswar across the Khari river.

== Education ==
Dr. Gourmohan Roy College was established at Monteswar in 1986. It offers honours courses in Bengali, Sanskrit, English, history, geography, political science, philosophy and accountancy.

The Imperial Institute of Design (IID), recognized by the Ministry of Micro, Small and Medium Enterprises, government of India, is located in Monteswar.

== Culture ==
=== Dharmathakur, Gajan and Chamunda festival ===
Monteswar has two Dharmathakurs and a gajan festival is celebrated with its traditional fervour, during Baisakh Purnima. The Chamunda festival at Monteswar is particularly note-worthy. All sections of people participate in the festivities for the presiding deity of the village and it goes through numerous rituals. The idol of the goddess is taken out of the temple and the worshipping and festivities are held in the open. The idol and the priest are carried on shoulders and taken around the village. Animal sacrifices are carried out on a large scale. Scholars have pointed out the predominance of non-Aryan influence in practices during these festivities, that start in Vaisakha shukla paksha Monteswar also has Shiva, Siddheswari and other temples.

=== Sripat Denur ===
Denur is about 6–7 km from Monteswar bus stand and 28 km from Katwa. Denur is the birthplace of Kesava Bharati, who bestowed sannyasa on Chaitanya Mahaprabhu. The Viashnavite poet and author of Chaitanya Bhagavata, Vrindavana Dasa Thakura was a resident of Denur. The temple of Denureswar Shiva has exquisite terracotta carvings. The temple of Vrindabana Dasa Thakura has idols of Mahishamardini and Chaitanya Mahaprabhu, a combination of Shaktism and Vaishnavism.

== Healthcare ==
Monteswar Rural Hospital at Monteswar (with 30 beds) is the main medical facility in Manteswar CD block. There are primary health centres at Dhanyakherur, PO Majhergram (with 10 beds), Moinampur, PO Katsihi (with 6 beds) and Putsuri (with 6 beds).

See also - Healthcare in West Bengal
