= Jaluidanga =

- Census Town
- Location in West Bengal, India Jaluidanga (India)
- Coordinates: 23.3418°N 88.3456°E
- Country: India
- State: West Bengal
- District: Purba Bardhaman

Area
  - Total: 1.72 km^{2} (0.66 sq mi)

Population (2011)
  - Total: 4,571
  - Density: 2,660/km^{2} (6,880/sq mi)

Languages
  - Official: Bengali, English
- Time zone: UTC+5:30 (IST)
- Vehicle registration: WB
- Lok Sabha constituency: Bardhaman Purba
- Vidhan Sabha constituency: Purbasthali Dakshin
- Website: purbabardhaman.gov.in

Jaluidanga is a census town in Purbasthali I CD Block in Kalna subdivision of Purba Bardhaman district in the Indian state of West Bengal.

== Geography ==
Cities and towns in the Kalna subdivision of Purba Bardhaman district
M: municipal city/ town, CT: census town, R: rural/ urban centre. H: historical/ religious centre, C: craft centre
Owing to space constraints in the small map, the actual locations in a larger map may vary slightly

=== Location ===
Jaluidanga is located at 23.3418°N 88.3456°E .

Jaluidanga is also shown in the map of Purbasthali I CD block in the District Census Handbook.

=== Urbanisation ===
87.00% of the population of Kalna subdivision live in the rural areas. Only 13.00% of the population live in the urban areas. The map alongside presents some of the notable locations in the subdivision. All places marked in the map are linked in the larger full screen map.

== Demographics ==
As per the 2011 Census of India, Jaluidanga had a total population of 4,571 of which 2,411 (53%) were males and 2,160 (47%) were females. Population below 6 years was 479. The total number of literates in Jaluidanga was 3,175 (77.59% of the population over 6 years).

== Infrastructure ==
As per the District Census Handbook 2011, Jaluidanga covered an area of 1.7206 km^{2}. It had 2 km roads. Amongst the medical facilities, the nearest nursing home was 3 km away and the nearest veterinary hospital was 14 km away. Amongst the educational facilities it had was 3 primary schools and 1 secondary school. The nearest higher secondary school was at Paruldanga 3 km away.
