= Piarinagar =

- Census Town
- Location in West Bengal, India Piarinagar (India)
- Coordinates: 23.2576°N 88.3424°E
- Country: India
- State: West Bengal
- District: Purba Bardhaman

Area
  - Total: 2.55 km^{2} (0.98 sq mi)

Population (2011)
  - Total: 3,678
  - Density: 1,440/km^{2} (3,740/sq mi)

Languages
  - Official: Bengali, English
- Time zone: UTC+5:30 (IST)
- Vehicle registration: WB
- Lok Sabha constituency: Bardhaman Purba
- Vidhan Sabha constituency: Purbasthali Dakshin
- Website: purbabardhaman.gov.in

Piarinagar is a census town in Kalna I CD Block in Kalna subdivision of Purba Bardhaman district in the Indian state of West Bengal.

== Geography ==
Cities and towns in the Kalna subdivision of Purba Bardhaman district
M: municipal city/ town, CT: census town, R: rural/ urban centre, H: historical/ religious centre, C: craft centre
Owing to space constraints in the small map, the actual locations in a larger map may vary slightly

=== Location ===
Piarinagar is located at 23.2576°N 88.3424°E.

Piarinagar is also shown in the map of Kalna I CD block in the District Census Handbook.

=== Urbanisation ===
87.00% of the population of Kalna subdivision live in the rural areas. Only 13.00% of the population live in the urban areas. The map alongside presents some of the notable locations in the subdivision. All places marked in the map are linked in the larger full screen map.

== Demographics ==
As per the 2011 Census of India, Piarinagar had a total population of 3,678 of which 1,917 (52%) were males and 1,761 (48%) were females. Population below 6 years was 345. The total number of literates in Piarinagar was 2,867 (86.02% of the population over 6 years).

== Infrastructure ==
As per the District Census Handbook 2011, Piarinagar covered an area of 2.5518 km^{2}. It had 4 km roads. Amongst the medical facilities, the nearest nursing home was 2 km away and the nearest veterinary hospital was 1 km away. It had 2 primary schools. Major educational facilities were available 7 km away at Kalna.
