= Shashpur =

- Census Town
- Location in West Bengal, India Shashpur (India)
- Coordinates: 23.2126°N 88.3794°E
- Country: India
- State: West Bengal
- District: Purba Bardhaman

Area
  - Total: 2.42 km^{2} (0.93 sq mi)

Population (2011)
  - Total: 10,100
  - Density: 4,170/km^{2} (10,800/sq mi)

Languages
  - Official: Bengali, English
- Time zone: UTC+5:30 (IST)
- Vehicle registration: WB
- Lok Sabha constituency: Bardhaman Purba
- Vidhan Sabha constituency: Purbasthali Dakshin
- Website: purbabardhaman.gov.in

Shashpur is a census town in Kalna II CD Block in Kalna subdivision of Purba Bardhaman district in the Indian state of West Bengal.

== Geography ==
Cities and towns in the Kalna subdivision of Purba Bardhaman district
M: municipal city/ town, CT: census town, R: rural/ urban centre, H: historical/ religious centre, C: craft centre.
Owing to space constraints in the small map, the actual locations in a larger map may vary slightly

=== Location ===
Shashpur is located at 23.2126°N 88.3794°E.

Shashpur is also shown in the map of Kalna II CD block in the District Census Handbook.

=== Urbanisation ===
87.00% of the population of Kalna subdivision live in the rural areas. Only 13.00% of the population live in the urban areas. The map alongside presents some of the notable locations in the subdivision. All places marked in the map are linked in the larger full screen map.

== Demographics ==
As per the 2011 Census of India, Shashpur had a total population of 10,100 of which 5,240 (52%) were males and 4,860 (48%) were females. Population below 6 years was 1,071. The total number of literates in Shashpur was 6,598 (73.08% of the population over 6 years).

== Infrastructure ==
As per the District Census Handbook 2011, Shashpur covered an area of 2.4249 km^{2}. Amongst the medical facilities, the nearest nursing home was 22 km away and the nearest veterinary hospital was 22 km away. It had 4 medicine shops. It had 3 primary schools. Major educational facilities were available 1 km away at Kalna.

Note: There are major medical facilities at Kalna.

== Transport ==
Shashpur is off State Highway 6. Ambika Kalna railway station is located nearby.
