= Nasratpur =

- Census Town
- Location in West Bengal, India Nasratpur (India)
- Coordinates: 23.3268°N 88.3296°E
- Country: India
- State: West Bengal
- District: Purba Bardhaman

Area
  - Total: 1.57 km^{2} (0.61 sq mi)

Population (2011)
  - Total: 17,044
  - Density: 10,900/km^{2} (28,100/sq mi)

Languages
  - Official: Bengali, English
- Time zone: UTC+5:30 (IST)
- Vehicle registration: WB
- Lok Sabha constituency: Bardhaman Purba
- Vidhan Sabha constituency: Purbasthali Dakshin
- Website: purbabardhaman.gov.in

Nasratpur is a census town in Purbasthali I CD Block in Kalna subdivision of Purba Bardhaman district in the Indian state of West Bengal.

== Geography ==
Cities and towns in the Kalna subdivision of Purba Bardhaman district
M: municipal city/ town, CT: census town, R: rural/ urban centre, H: historical/ religious centre, C: craft centre.
Owing to space constraints in the small map, the actual locations in a larger map may vary slightly

=== Location ===
Nasratpur is located at 23.3268°N 88.3296°E.

Nasratpur is also shown in the map of Purbasthali I CD block in the District Census Handbook.

=== Urbanisation ===
87.00% of the population of Kalna subdivision live in the rural areas. Only 13.00% of the population live in the urban areas. The map alongside presents some of the notable locations in the subdivision. All places marked in the map are linked in the larger full screen map.

== Demographics ==
As per the 2011 Census of India, Nasratpur had a total population of 17,044 of which 8,743 (51%) were males and 8,301 (49%) were females. Population below 6 years was 2,337. The total number of literates in Nasratpur was 9,834 (66.87% of the population over 6 years).

== Infrastructure ==
As per the District Census Handbook 2011, Nasratpur covered an area of 1.5665 km^{2}. It had 2.5 km roads. Amongst the medical facilities, the nearest nursing home was 4 km away and the nearest veterinary hospital was 40 km away. It had one medicine shop. Amongst the educational facilities were four primary schools. The nearest higher secondary school was at Paruldanga 2 km away.

== Transport ==
Nasratpur is off State Highway 6. Samudragarh railway station is located nearby.
