= Routhgram =

- Village
- Location in West Bengal, India Routhgram (India)
- Coordinates: 23.420959°N 88.193092°E
- Country: India
- State: West Bengal
- District: Purba Bardhaman

Population (2011)
  - Total: 3,506

Languages
  - Official: Bengali, English
- Time zone: UTC+5:30 (IST)
- STD code: 0342
- ISO 3166 code: IN-WB

Routhgram (also spelled Rautgram) is a village in Manteswar CD block in Kalna subdivision of Purba Bardhaman district, West Bengal, India. It is adjacent to Kaigram

== Demographics ==
As per the 2011 Census of India Rautgram had a total population of 3,506, of which 1,746 (50%) were males and 1,760 (50%) were females. Population below 6 years was 484. The total number of literates in Rautgram was 2,165 (71.64% of the population over 6 years).

== Economy ==
The main market of the area, called Hattala is under this village. The bus stop of the locality is also under this village.

The main occupation is agriculture.

The STD code of the village is 0342.

== Temples and festivals ==
The village has temples to the deities Sarbamangala, Shiva, Durga, Jagaddhatri, and Shani.

The major festival of the village is Sarbamangala Puja which takes place over several days in late winter, when visitors come to the village.

== Sports ==
There is a football ground (Paldhirpar) at one end of the village.

== Schools ==
1. Kaigram High School
2. Routhgram D.D. Panja F.P. School
3. Routhgram S.S.K.
