= Samudragarh =

- Village
- Location in West Bengal, India Samudragarh (India)
- Coordinates: 23.3488°N 88.3216°E
- Country: India
- State: West Bengal
- District: Purba Bardhaman

Government
  - Type: Block
  - Body: Purbasthali Block I

Population (2011)
  - Total: 13,009

Languages
  - Official: Bengali, English
- Time zone: UTC+5:30 (IST)
- PIN: 713519
- Website: bardhaman.gov.in

Samudragarh is a village in Purbasthali I CD block in Kalna subdivision of Purba Bardhaman district in the state of West Bengal, India. Nadanghat police station serves this village. It is about 15 km away from Kalna, India. It is situated on the western bank of the Bhāgirathi.

== Etymology ==
The word Samudragarh derives from two Bengali term Samudra (means sea in English) and Garh (means fort in English). Though there are several explanations about the origin of this name but the main explanation is that the term Samudra came from a name of the king Samudrasena of Vanga who fought on the side of the Kauravas during the Kurukshetra war. Another explanation is that the area is surrounded by water bodies in all side, so related to water, the name might have come.

== Geography ==
Cities and towns in the Kalna subdivision of Purba Bardhaman district
M: municipal city/ town, CT: census town, R: rural/ urban centre, H: historical/ religious centre, C: craft centre.
Owing to space constraints in the small map, the actual locations in a larger map may vary slightly

=== Location ===
Samudragarh is located on the agriculturally rich alluvial plains between the Bhagirathi, Ajay and Damodar rivers. Temperatures in this region varies from 17-18 °C in winter to 30-32 °C in summer.

=== Police station ===
Nadanghat police station has jurisdiction over parts of Purbasthali I and Purbasthali II CD Blocks. The area covered is 60 km^{2}.

== Demographics ==
As per the 2011 Census of India, Samudragar had a total population of 13,089 of which 6,826 (52%) were males and 6,263 (48%) were females. Population below 6 years was 1,343. The total number of literates in Samudragar was 9,424 (80.23% of the population over 6 years).

== Transport ==
Samudragarh railway station is about 97 km from Howrah on the Howrah-Bandel-Katwa branch line of Eastern Railway. It has 2 railway stations as Samudragarh (station of Howrah railway division) and Nandai Gram (station of Howrah railway division).

Bus services
Nabadwip-Kalna via Saudragarh
Nabadwip-Burdwan via Samudragarh, Dhatrigram
Kalna-Burdwan via Samudragarh

== Economy ==
After the partition of India, many weavers of Dhaka came and settled in West Bengal around Shantipur in Nadia district and Ambika Kalna of Bardhaman district, both traditionally renowned centres for hand-woven fabrics. With government encouragement and support, the talented weavers soon revived their ancestral occupation and the art of exquisite weaving once again flourished. Today, finely woven feather-touch textiles and saris in exotic designs and colours are being produced in the vast weaving belt of Shantipur, Phulia, Samudragarh, Dhatrigram and Ambika Kalna—each centre producing superb fabrics in its own unique weaving style. Samudragram specializes in a combination of jacquard and jamdani work. The produce is marketed through co-operatives and various undertakings.

== Festivals ==
(1) Dol Purnima (feb-mar) Pilgrims come from all over the world to attend this festival which actually takes place in Nabadwip and surrounding historical places related with Lord Sri Chaitanya. Travelers come to the Gour-Gadhadhar temple located in Samudragarh.

(2) Cracker festival (sep/oct) This is the very own festival of Samudragarh. It takes place right after the Durga puja and follows the trail.

(3) Also almost all the festivals related with Bengali culture are celebrated here like Pohela Baisakh, Saraswati puja, Durga puja etc.

== Education ==
Samudragarh has mainly 4 Higher Secondary schools. They are

1. Paruldanga Nasaratpur High School

2. Samudragarh High School

3. Jaluidanga G.C.P Balika Vidyalaya

4. Champahati K.P.C Balika Vidyalaya

also so many primary schools are there.
