= Badla, Purba Bardhaman =

Badla
- Village
- Location in West Bengal, India Badla (India)
- Coordinates: 23.1567°N 88.2816°E
- Country: India
- State: West Bengal
- District: Purba Bardhaman

Population (2011)
  - Total: 1,935

Languages
  - Official: Bengali, English
- Time zone: UTC+5:30 (IST)
- Lok Sabha constituency: Bardhaman Purba
- Vidhan Sabha constituency: Kalna
- Website: purbabardhaman.gov.in

Badla is a village in Kalna II CD block in Kalna subdivision of Purba Bardhaman district in the Indian state of West Bengal.

== Geography ==
Cities and towns in the Kalna subdivision of Purba Bardhaman district
M: municipal city/ town, CT: census town, R: rural/ urban centre, H: historical/ religious centre, C: craft centre.
Owing to space constraints in the small map, the actual locations in a larger map may vary slightly

=== Location ===
Badla is located at 23.1567°N 88.2816°E. Badla is located near Singarkone, where the CD block offices of Kalna II CD block are there.

=== Urbanisation ===
87.00% of the population of Kalna subdivision live in the rural areas. Only 13.00% of the population live in the urban areas. The map alongside presents some of the notable locations in the subdivision. All places marked in the map are linked in the larger full screen map.

== Demographics ==
As per the 2011 Census of India, Badla had a total population of 1,935 of which 950 (49%) were males and 985 (51%) were females. Population below 6 years was 187. The total number of literates in Badla was 1,307 (74.77% of the population over 6 years).

== Transport ==
Pandua-Singarkone Road links Badla to Boinchi-Kalna Road.

== Education ==
Badla Vivekananda B.Ed. College was established in 2015.

== Culture ==
Baidyapur Jora Deul, a monument of national importance, is located nearby.

== Healthcare ==
Badla block primary health centre at Badla, PO Chagram (with 15 beds) is the main medical facility in Kalna II CD block. There are primary health centres at Akalpoush (with 6 beds), Angarson, PO Pindra (with 2 beds), Baidyapur (with 15 beds) and Tehatta (with 2 beds). In 2012, the average monthly patients attending Badla BPHC were 4,684 and average monthly admissions were 115. It handled 1,222 annual emergency admissions.
