= Atgharia =

- Village
- Location in West Bengal, India Atgharia (India)
- Coordinates: 23.2756°N 88.2767°E
- Country: India
- State: West Bengal
- District: Purba Bardhaman

Population (2011)
  - Total: 2,188

Languages
  - Official: Bengali, English
- Time zone: UTC+5:30 (IST)
- Lok Sabha constituency: Bardhaman Purba
- Vidhan Sabha constituency: Purbasthali Dakshin
- Website: purbabardhaman.gov.in

Atgharia is a village and a gram panchayat in Kalna I CD block in Kalna subdivision of Purba Bardhaman district in the Indian state of West Bengal.

== Geography ==
Cities and towns in the Kalna subdivision of Purba Bardhaman district
M: municipal city/ town, CT: census town, R: rural/ urban centre, H: historical/ religious centre, C: craft centre.
Owing to space constraints in the small map, the actual locations in a larger map may vary slightly,

=== Location ===
Atgharia is located at 23.2756°N 88.2767°E.

=== Urbanisation ===
87.00% of the population of Kalna subdivision live in the rural areas. Only 13.00% of the population live in the urban areas. The map alongside presents some of the notable locations in the subdivision. All places marked in the map are linked in the larger full screen map.

== Demographics ==
As per the 2011 Census of India, Atgharia had a total population of 2,188 of which 1,107 (51%) were males and 1,081 (49%) were females. Population below 6 years was 128. The total number of literates in Atgharia was 1,581 (79.21% of the population over 6 years).

== Transport ==
Atgharia is located on Kalna Road.

== Healthcare ==
Atgharia Rural Hospital at Atgharia (with 30 beds) is the main medical facility in Kalna I CD block. There are primary health centres at Baghnapara (with 10 beds), Sahajpur (with 6 beds) and Sultanpur (with 10 beds).
