= Singarkone =

- Village
- Location in West Bengal, India Singarkone (India)
- Coordinates: 23.1677°N 88.2959°E
- Country: India
- State: West Bengal
- District: Purba Bardhaman

Population (2011)
  - Total: 3,485

Languages
  - Official: Bengali, English
- Time zone: UTC+5:30 (IST)
- PIN: 713170 (Singerkone)
- Telephone/STD code: 03454
- Lok Sabha constituency: Bardhaman Purba
- Vidhan Sabha constituency: Kalna
- Website: bardhaman.gov.in

Singarkone is a village in Kalna II CD block in Kalna subdivision of Purba Bardhaman district in the state of West Bengal, India.

== Geography ==
Cities and towns in the Kalna subdivision of Purba Bardhaman district
M: municipal city/ town, CT: census town, R: rural/ urban centre, H: historical/ religious centre, C: craft centre.
Owing to space constraints in the small map, the actual locations in a larger map may vary slightly

=== Location ===
Singarkone is located at 23.1677°N 88.2959°E

=== CD block HQ ===
The headquarters of Kalna II CD block are located at Singarkone.

=== Urbanisation ===
87.00% of the population of Kalna subdivision lives in the rural areas. Only 13.00% of the population lives in the urban areas. The map alongside presents some of the notable locations in the subdivision. All places marked in the map are linked in the larger full screen map.

== Demographics ==
As per the 2011 Census of India Singarkon had a total population of 3,485, of which 1,784 (51%) were males and 1,701 (49%) were females. Population below 6 years was 331. The total number of literates in Singarkon was 2,514 (79.71% of the population over 6 years).

== Market ==
According to local information, Bengali poet Jatindranath Sengupta was born in his maternal uncle’s ancestral home at Patilpara village, located nearby, on 26 June 1887. Although he belonged to Santipur, he spent a lot of his time in the area. He had penned a piece about the Singarkone market. The state government is developing the market in his memory.

== Transport ==
Kalna-Boinchee Road passes through Singarkone.

== Culture ==
Baidyapur Jora Deul, a monument of national importance, is located nearby.

== Healthcare ==
Badla block primary health centre at Badla is located nearby.
