= Gopinathpur, West Bengal =

Gopinathpur
- Census Town
- Location in West Bengal, India Gopinathpur (India)
- Coordinates: 23.3318°N 88.3256°E
- Country: India
- State: West Bengal
- District: Purba Bardhaman

Area
  - Total: 1.89 km^{2} (0.73 sq mi)
- Elevation: 17 m (56 ft)

Population (2011)
  - Total: 4,688
  - Density: 2,480/km^{2} (6,420/sq mi)

Languages
  - Official: Bengali, English
- Time zone: UTC+5:30 (IST)
- ISO 3166 code: IN-WB
- Vehicle registration: WB
- Website: purbabardhaman.gov.in

Gopinathpur is a census town in Purbasthali I CD Block in Kalna subdivision of Purba Bardhaman district in the Indian state of West Bengal.

== Geography ==
Cities and towns in the Kalna subdivision of Purba Bardhaman district
M: municipal city/ town, CT: census town, R: rural/ urban centre, H: historical/ religious centre, C: craft centre.
Owing to space constraints in the small map, the actual locations in a larger map may vary slightly

=== Location ===
Gopinathpur is located at 23.3318°N 88.3256°E. It has an average elevation of 17 metres (56 ft).

Gopinathpur is located between the Bhagirathi, Ajay and Damodar rivers. Temperatures in this region varies from 17–18 °C (63–64 °F) in winter to 30–32 °C (86–90 °F) in summer.

=== Urbanisation ===
87.00% of the population of Kalna subdivision live in the rural areas. Only 13.00% of the population live in the urban areas. The map alongside presents some of the notable locations in the subdivision. All places marked in the map are linked in the larger full screen map.

== Demographics ==
As per the 2011 Census of India Gopinathpur had a total population of 4,688, of which 2,498 (53%) were males and 2,190 (47%) were females. Population below 6 years was 398. The total number of literates in Gopinathpur was 3,616 (84.29% of the population over 6 years).

As of 2001 India census, Gopinathpur had a population of 4,983. Males constitute 53% of the population and females 47%. Gopinathpur has an average literacy rate of 68%, higher than the national average of 59.5%: male literacy is 74%, and female literacy is 62%. In Gopinathpur, 12% of the population is under 6 years of age.

== Infrastructure ==
As per the District Census Handbook 2011, Gopinathpur covered an area of 1.89 square kilometres (0.73 sq mi). It had 2 kilometres (1.2 mi) of roads. Amongst the medical facilities, the nearest nursing home was 2 kilometres (1.2 mi) away and the nearest veterinary hospital was 15 kilometres (9.3 mi) away. It had 2 medicine shops. Amongst the educational facilities it had was 2 primary schools. The nearest higher secondary school was at Paruldanga 3 kilometres (1.9 mi) away.

== Transport ==
Gopinathpur is on State Highway 6. Samudragarh railway station is located nearby.

== Education ==
Gopinathpur has two primary schools.
