= Kalna II =

- Community development block
- Location in West Bengal
- Coordinates: 23°13′00″N 88°22′00″E
- Country: India
- State: West Bengal
- District: Purba Bardhaman
- Parliamentary constituency: Bardhaman Purba
- Assembly constituency: Kalna

Area
  - Total: 66.48 sq mi (172.17 km^{2})
- Elevation: 39 ft (12 m)

Population (2011)
  - Total: 167,335
  - Density: 2,517.3/sq mi (971.92/km^{2})
- Time zone: UTC+5.30 (IST)
- PIN: 713170 (Singerkone); 713157 (Akalpoush); 713122 (Baidyapur)
- Telephone/STD code: 03454
- Vehicle registration: WB-37,WB-38,WB-41,WB-42,WB-44
- Literacy Rate: 76.25 per cent
- Website: http://purbabardhaman.gov.in/

Kalna II is a community development block that forms an administrative division in Kalna subdivision of Purba Bardhaman district in the Indian state of West Bengal. It has a population of 167,335 as of 2011.

== Geography ==
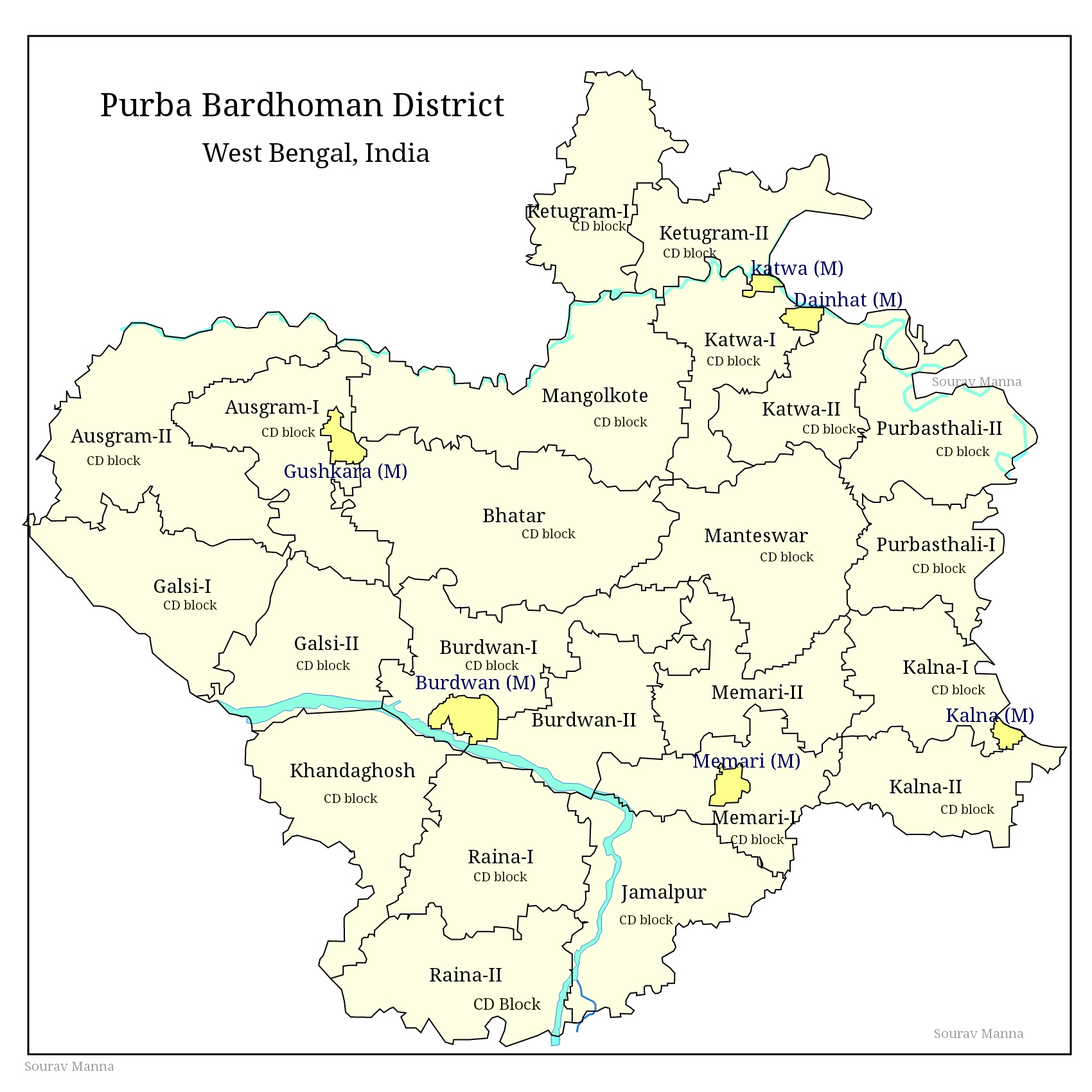
CD blocks of Purba Bardhaman district

=== Location ===
Singarkon is located at 23°09′38″N 88°16′00″E.

Kalna II CD Block is part of the Bhagirathi basin. The region has many swamps and water-logged areas. The soil is fertile, as it consists mainly of silt deposits.

Kalna II CD Block is bounded by Kalna I CD Block on the north, Balagarh CD Block, in Hooghly district, on the east, Pandua CD Block, in Hooghly district, on the south and Memari I CD Block on the west.

Kalna II CD Block has an area of 172.17 km^{2}. It has 1 panchayat samity, 8 gram panchayats, 124 gram sansads (village councils), 113 mouzas and 112 inhabited villages. Kalna police station serves this block. Headquarters of this CD Block is at Singarkone.

Gram panchayats of Kalna II block/panchayat samiti are: Akalpoush, Anukhal, Badla, Baidyapur, Baradhamas, Kalyanpur, Pindira and Satgachi.

== Demographics ==
=== Population ===
As per the 2011 Census of India Kalna II CD Block had a total population of 167,335, of which 157,235 were rural and 10,100 were urban. There were 84,680 (51%) males and 82,655 (49%) females. Population below 6 years was 16,567. Scheduled Castes numbered 61,255 (36.61%) and Scheduled Tribes numbered 28,930 (17.29%).

As per 2001 census, Kalna II block had a total population of 152,853, out of which 78,322 were males and 74,531 were females. Kalna II block registered a population growth of 20.37 per cent during the 1991-2001 decade. Decadal growth for Bardhaman district was 14.36 per cent. Decadal growth in West Bengal was 17.84 per cent. Scheduled castes at 60,120 formed more than one-third the population. Scheduled tribes numbered 26,096.

Census Town in Kalna II CD Block is (2011 census figure in brackets): Shashpur (10,100).

Large villages (with 4,000+ population) in Kalna II CD Block are (2011 census figures in brackets): Baidyapur (4,065), Jiudhara (P) (5,167) and Satapati (5,093).

Other villages in Kalna II CD Block include (2011census figures in brackets): Pindira (1,213), Satgachhi (1,088), Akalpoush (2,394), Badla (1,935), Kalyanpur (1,887), Bara Dhamas (2,228), Hasanhati (1,475) and Udaypur (811).

=== Literacy ===
As per the 2011 census the total number of literates in Kalna II CD Block was 114,958 (76.25% of the population over 6 years) out of which males numbered 62,920 (82.55% of the male population over 6 years) and females numbered 52,038 (69.80% of the female population over 6 years). The gender disparity (the difference between female and male literacy rates) was 12.75%.

As per 2001 census, Kalna II block had a total literacy of 67.22 per cent for the 6+ age group. While male literacy was 76.39 per cent female literacy was 57.64 per cent. Bardhaman district had a total literacy of 70.18 per cent, male literacy being 78.63 per cent and female literacy being 60.95 per cent.

See also – List of West Bengal districts ranked by literacy rate

Literacy in CD blocks of
Bardhaman district
Bardhaman Sadar North subdivision
Ausgram I – 69.39%
Ausgram II – 68.00%
Bhatar – 71.56%
Burdwan I – 76.07%
Burdwan II – 74.12%
Galsi II – 70.05%
Bardhaman Sadar South subdivision
Khandaghosh – 77.28%
Raina I – 80.20%
Raina II – 81.48%
Jamalpur – 74.08%
Memari I – 74.10%
Memari II – 74.59%
Kalna subdivision
Kalna I – 75.81%
Kalna II – 76.25%
Manteswar – 73.08%
Purbasthali I – 77.59%
Purbasthali II – 70.35%
Katwa subdivision
Katwa I – 70.36%
Katwa II – 69.16%
Ketugram I – 68.00%
Ketugram II – 65.96%
Mongalkote – 67.97%
Durgapur subdivision
Andal – 77.25%
Faridpur Durgapur – 74.14%
Galsi I – 72.81%
Kanksa – 76.34%
Pandabeswar – 73.01%
Asansol subdivision
Barabani – 69.58%
Jamuria – 69.42%
Raniganj – 73.86%
Salanpur – 78.76%
2011 Census: CD Block Wise

Primary Census Abstract Data

=== Languages and religion ===
Religion in Kalna II CD block (2011)
Hinduism	80.32%
Islam	15.34%
Sarna	3.93%
Other or not stated	0.41%

In the 2011 census Hindus numbered 134,406 and formed 80.32% of the population in Kalna II CD Block. Muslims numbered 25,667 and formed 15.34% of the population. Christians numbered 350 and formed 0.21% of the population. Others numbered 6,912 and formed 4.13% of the population.

In Bardhaman district the percentage of Hindu population has been declining from 84.3% in 1961 to 77.9% in 2011 and the percentage of Muslim population has increased from 15.2% in 1961 to 20.7% in 2011.

Languages of Kalna II CD block (2011)
1. Bengali (84.1%)
2. Santali (14.1%)
3. Hindi (0.98%)
4. Others (0.91%)

At the time of the 2011 census, 84.06% of the population spoke Bengali, 14.05% Santali and 0.98% Hindi as their first language.

== Rural poverty ==
As per poverty estimates obtained from household survey for families living below poverty line in 2005, rural poverty in Kalna II CD Block was 24.10%.

== Economy ==
=== Livelihood ===
In Kalna II CD Block in 2011, amongst the class of total workers, cultivators formed 17.55%, agricultural labourers 49.14%, household industry workers 5.05% and other workers 28.25%.

Kalna II CD Block is part of the area where agriculture dominates the scenario but the secondary and tertiary sectors have shown an increasing trend.

=== Infrastructure ===
There are 112 inhabited villages in Kalna II CD block. All 112 villages (100%) have power supply. All 112 villages (100%) have drinking water supply. 16 villages (14.29%) have post offices. 110 villages (98.21%) have telephones (including landlines, public call offices and mobile phones). 48 villages (42.86%) have a pucca (paved) approach road and 43 villages (38.39%) have transport communication (includes bus service, rail facility and navigable waterways). 21 villages (18.75%) have agricultural credit societies. 11 villages (9.82%) have banks.

In 2013–14, there were 73 fertiliser depots, 26 seed stores and 33 fair price shops in the CD Block.

=== Agriculture ===
Persons engaged in agriculture
in Kalna II CD Block
1. Bargadars (9.20%)
2. Patta holders (13.2%)
3. Small farmers (5.07%)
4. Marginal farmers (17.0%)
5. Agricultural labourers (55.5%)

Although the Bargadari Act of 1950 recognised the rights of bargadars to a higher share of crops from the land that they tilled, it was not implemented fully. Large tracts, beyond the prescribed limit of land ceiling, remained with the rich landlords. From 1977 onwards major land reforms took place in West Bengal. Land in excess of land ceiling was acquired and distributed amongst the peasants. Following land reforms land ownership pattern has undergone transformation. In 2013–14, persons engaged in agriculture Kalna II could be classified as follows: bargadars 9.20%, patta (document) holders 13.22%, small farmers (possessing land between 1 and 2 hectares) 5.07%, marginal farmers (possessing land up to 1 hectare) 16.99% and agricultural labourers 55.52%.

In 2003-04 net cropped area in Kalna II Block was 13,214 hectares and the area in which more than one crop was grown was 13,666 hectares.

In 2013–14, Kalna II CD Block produced 34,401 tonnes of Aman paddy, the main winter crop, from 11,180 hectares, 15,580 tonnes of Boro paddy (spring crop) from 4,362 hectares, 3 tonnes of wheat from 1 hectare, 16,005 tonnes of jute from 623 hectares and 102,651 tonnes of potatoes from 4,216 hectares. It also produced pulses and oilseeds.

In Bardhaman district as a whole Aman paddy constituted 64.32% of the total area under paddy cultivation, while the area under Boro and Aus paddy constituted 32.87% and 2.81% respectively. The expansion of Boro paddy cultivation, with higher yield rates, was the result of expansion of irrigation system and intensive cropping. In 2013–14, the total area irrigated in Kalna II CD Block was 6,200.78 hectares, out of which 4,734.55 hectares were irrigated by canal water, 163.03 hectares by river lift irrigation and 1,303.25 hectares by deep tube wells.

=== Banking ===
In 2013–14, Kalna II CD Block had offices of 7 commercial banks and 1 gramin bank.

== Transport ==
Kalna II CD Block has 8 originating/ terminating bus routes.

The Bandel-Katwa branch line passes through this CD Block but there is no station in this CD Block (between Ambika Kalna and Guptipara).

State Highway 6 (West Bengal) running from Rajnagar (in Birbhum district) to Alampur (in Howrah district) passes through this block.

== Education ==
In 2013–14, Kalna II CD Block had 111 primary schools with 7,403 students, 6 middle schools with 374 students, 12 high schools with 7,406 students and 8 higher secondary schools with 10,066 students. Kalna II CD Block had 1 general college with 717 students, 1 technical/ professional institute with 100 students, 317 institutions for special and non-formal education with 9,276 students. Kalna (municipality), outside the CD Block area, had 1 general college with 4,866 students.

As per the 2011 census, in Kalna II CD block, amongst the 112 inhabited villages, 8 villages did not have schools, 34 villages had two or more primary schools, 24 villages had at least 1 primary and 1 middle school and 16 villages had at least 1 middle and 1 secondary school.

More than 6,000 schools (in erstwhile Bardhaman district) serve cooked midday meal to more than 900,000 students.

== Healthcare ==
In 2014, Kalna II CD Block had 1 block primary health centre and 4 primary health centres with total 40 beds and 7 doctors (excluding private bodies). It had 26 family welfare subcentres. 2,938 patients were treated indoor and 243.321 patients were treated outdoor in the hospitals, health centres and subcentres of the CD Block.

Badla block primary health centre at Badla, PO Chagram (with 15 beds) is the main medical facility in Kalna II CD block. There are primary health centres at Akalpoush (with 6 beds), Angarson, PO Pindra (with 2 beds), Baidyapur (with 15 beds) and Tehatta (with 2 beds).

Kalna II CD Block is one of the areas of Bardhaman district which is affected by a low level of arsenic contamination of ground water.
