= Kusumgram =

- Village
- Location in West Bengal, India Kusumgram (India)
- Coordinates: 23.3905°N 88.1335°E
- Country: India
- State: West Bengal
- District: Purba Bardhaman
- Elevation: 16 m (52 ft)

Population (2011)
  - Total: 11,707

Languages
  - Official: Bengali, English
- Time zone: UTC+5:30 (IST)
- PIN: 713422(Kusumgram)
- Telephone/STD code: 0342
- Lok Sabha constituency: Bardhaman-Durgapur
- Vidhan Sabha constituency: Manteswar
- Website: bardhaman.gov.in

Kusumgram is a large village in Manteswar CD block in Kalna subdivision of Purba Bardhaman district in the state of West Bengal

== Demographics ==
As per the 2011 Census of India Kusumgram had a total population of 11,707, of which 5,972 (51%) were males and 5,735 (49%) were females. Population below 6 years was 1,572. The total number of literates in Kusumgram was 7,470 (73.70% of the population over 6 years).

== Transport ==
State Highway 8 running from Santaldi (in Purulia district) to Majhdia (in Nadia district) and State Highway 15 running from Dainhat (in Purba Bardhaman district) to Gadiara (in Howrah district) cross at Kusumgram.

== Education ==
Kusumgram Tyeba Institution, established in 1923, is a Bengali-medium co-educational, higher secondary school.
