= Manteswar =

- Community development block
- Location in West Bengal
- Coordinates: 23°25′21″N 88°06′27″E
- Country: India
- State: West Bengal
- District: Purba Bardhaman
- Parliamentary constituency: Bardhaman-Durgapur, Bardhaman Purba
- Assembly constituency: Manteswar, Purbasthali Uttar

Area
  - Total: 117.83 sq mi (305.19 km^{2})
- Elevation: 52 ft (16 m)

Population (2011)
  - Total: 237,398
  - Density: 2,014.7/sq mi (777.87/km^{2})
- Time zone: UTC+5.30 (IST)
- PIN: 713145 (Manteswar)
- Telephone/STD code: 03453
- Vehicle registration: WB-37, WB-38, WB-41, WB-42, WB-44
- Literacy Rate: 73.08 per cent
- Website: https://purbabardhaman.gov.in/

Manteswar is a community development block that forms an administrative division in Kalna subdivision of Purba Bardhaman district in the Indian state of West Bengal.

== History ==
=== Administrative set up ===
When subdivisions were first formed by the British in 1860, Manteswar was one of the police stations of Kalna subdivision. It is also mentioned in Peterson's District Gazetteer of 1910.

=== Movements ===
In the wake of the movements against the partition of Bengal in 1905, Bandhab Samitis or Mahamaya Samitis were formed at Kalna, Manteswar and Purbasthali for physical training and revolutionary activities. In 1926–27, Damodar canal was developed for irrigation purposes. However, when canal tax was imposed opposition developed in Memari, Manteswar, Bhatar, the Ausgram community blocks and other irrigated areas. In 1938–40 the Congress organisation was strengthened by Gopen Kundu, Narayan Choudhury and Abdur Rahman. In 1943, when Damodar River flooded the entire area, relief was organised in the Manteswar area by the Communist Party.

== Geography ==
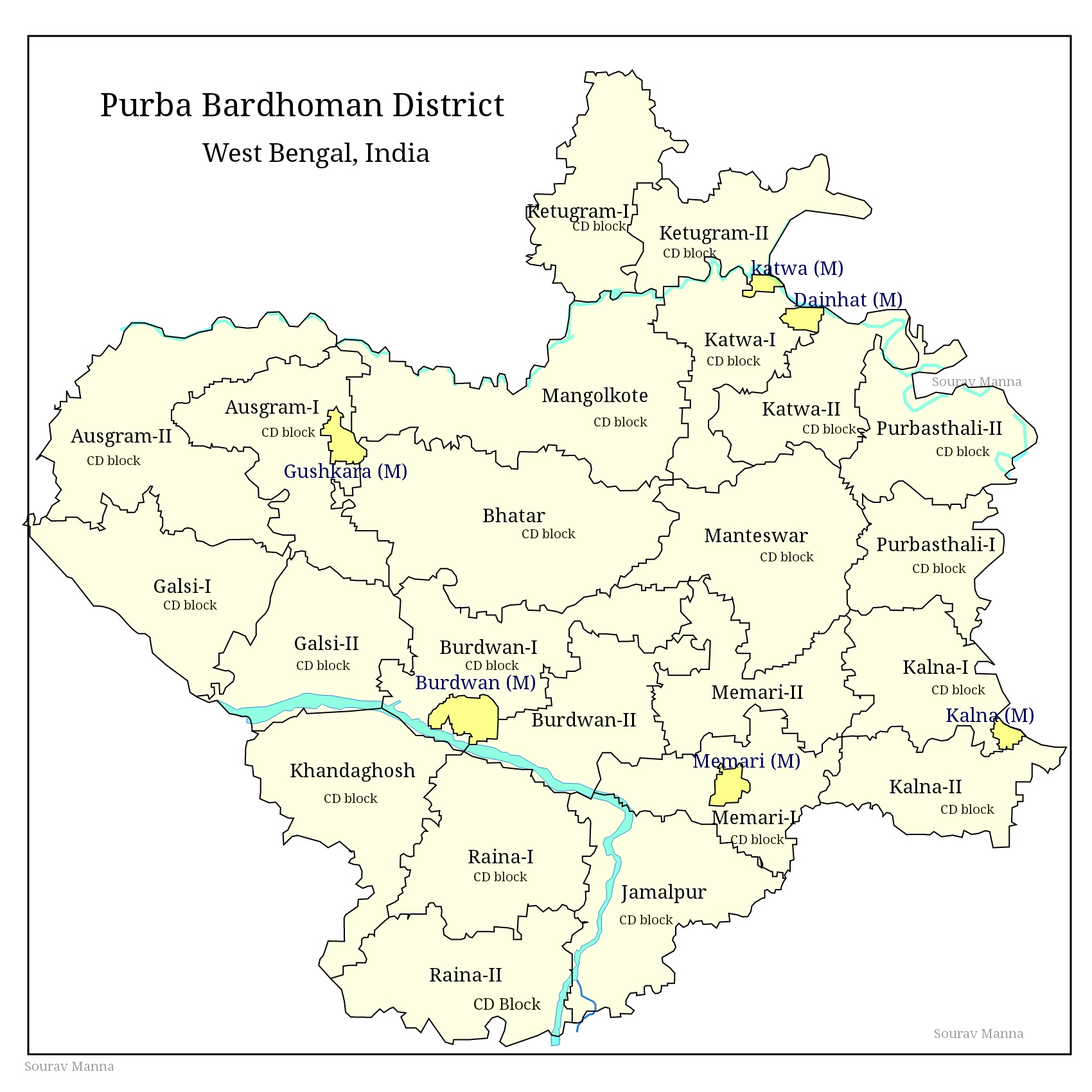
CD blocks of Purba Bardhaman district

=== Location ===
Manteswar is located at 23°25′21″N 88°06′27″E.

Manteswar CD Block is a part of the Bardhaman Plain, the central plain area of the district. The area is surrounded by the Bhagirathi on the east, the Ajay on the north-west and the Damodar on the west and south. Old river channels and small creeks found in the region dry up in the dry season, but the Bardhaman Plains are sometimes subject to heavy floods during the rainy season. The region has recent alluvial soils.

Manteswar CD Block is bounded by Katwa I and Katwa II CD Blocks on the north, Purbasthali I and Purbasthali II CD Blocks on the east, Memari II and Burdwan I CD Blocks on the south and Bhatar CD Block on the west.

Manteswar CD Block has an area of 305.19 km^{2}. It has 1 panchayat samity, 13 gram panchayats, 176 gram sansads (village councils), 144 mouzas and 136 inhabited villages. Manteswar police station serves this block. Headquarters of this CD Block is at Manteswar.

Gram panchayats of Manteswar block/panchayat samiti are: Baghason, Bamunpara, Bhagra-Mulgram, Denur, Jamna, Kusumgram, Majhergram, Mamudpur I, Mamudpur II, Manteswar, Piplon, Putsuri and Susunia.

== Demographics ==
=== Population ===
As per the 2011 Census of India Manteswar CD Block had a total population of 237,398, all of which were rural. There were 120,940 (51%) males and 116,458 (49%) females. Population below 6 years was 26,815. Scheduled Castes numbered 56,862 (23.95%) and Scheduled Tribes numbered 6,958 (2.93%).

As per 2001 census, Manteswar block had a total population of 213,262, out of which 109,544 were males and 103,718 were females. Manteswar block registered a population growth of 15.59 per cent during the 1991-2001 decade. Decadal growth for Bardhaman district was 14.36 per cent. Decadal growth in West Bengal was 17.84 per cent. Scheduled castes at 51,705 formed around one-fourth the population. Scheduled tribes numbered 8,092.

Large villages (with 4,000+ population) in Manteswar CD Block are (2011 census figures in brackets): Manteswar (9,331), Baghasan (4,974), Bamunpara (4,314), Putsuri (6,806), Denur (4,082), Kusumgram (11,707), Kulut (7,104), Raigram (7,185) and Bhagra (4,086).

Other villages in Manteswar CD Block include (2011 census figures in brackets): Piplan (3,708), Mulgram (3,652), Shushuna (3,722), Mamudpur (3,129), Jamna (1,173), Majhergram (3,187), Routhgram (3,506) and Kaigram (1,719).

=== Literacy ===
As per the 2011 census the total number of literates in Manteswar CD Block was 153,892 (73.08% of the population over 6 years) out of which males numbered 83,748 (78.04% of the male population over 6 years) and females numbered 70,144 (67.92% of the female population over 6 years). The gender disparity (the difference between female and male literacy rates) was 10.12%.

As per the 2001 census, Manteswar block had a total literacy of 65.94 per cent for the 6+ age group. While male literacy was 73.70 per cent female literacy was 57.63 per cent. Bardhaman district had a total literacy of 70.18 per cent, male literacy being 78.63 per cent and female literacy being 60.95 per cent.

See also – List of West Bengal districts ranked by literacy rate

Literacy in CD blocks of
Bardhaman district
Bardhaman Sadar North subdivision
Ausgram I – 69.39%
Ausgram II – 68.00%
Bhatar – 71.56%
Burdwan I – 76.07%
Burdwan II – 74.12%
Galsi II – 70.05%
Bardhaman Sadar South subdivision
Khandaghosh – 77.28%
Raina I – 80.20%
Raina II – 81.48%
Jamalpur – 74.08%
Memari I – 74.10%
Memari II – 74.59%
Kalna subdivision
Kalna I – 75.81%
Kalna II – 76.25%
Manteswar – 73.08%
Purbasthali I – 77.59%
Purbasthali II – 70.35%
Katwa subdivision
Katwa I – 70.36%
Katwa II – 69.16%
Ketugram I – 68.00%
Ketugram II – 65.96%
Mongalkote – 67.97%
Durgapur subdivision
Andal – 77.25%
Faridpur Durgapur – 74.14%
Galsi I – 72.81%
Kanksa – 76.34%
Pandabeswar – 73.01%
Asansol subdivision
Barabani – 69.58%
Jamuria – 69.42%
Raniganj – 73.86%
Salanpur – 78.76%
2011 Census: CD Block Wise

Primary Census Abstract Data

=== Languages and religion ===
Religion in Manteswar CD block (2011)
Hinduism	57.69%
Islam	41.77%
Other or not stated	0.54%

In the 2011 census Hindus numbered 136,963 and formed 57.69% of the population in Manteswar CD Block. Muslims numbered 99,161 and formed 41.77% of the population. Christians numbered 492 and formed 0.21% of the population. Others numbered 782 and formed 0.33% of the population.

In Bardhaman district the percentage of Hindu population has been declining from 84.3% in 1961 to 77.9% in 2011 and the percentage of Muslim population has increased from 15.2% in 1961 to 20.7% in 2011.

Languages of Manteswar CD block (2011)
1. Bengali (97.4%)
2. Santali (2.18%)
3. Others (0.42%)

At the time of the 2011 census, 97.40% of the population spoke Bengali and 2.18% Santali as their first language.

== Rural poverty ==
As per poverty estimates obtained from household survey for families living below poverty line in 2005, rural poverty in Manteswar CD Block was 40.45%.

== Economy ==
=== Livelihood ===
In Manteswar CD Block in 2011, amongst the class of total workers, cultivators formed 20.42%, agricultural labourers 50.60%, household industry workers 3.84% and other workers 25.14%.

Manteswar CD Block is part of the area where agriculture dominates the scenario but the secondary and tertiary sectors have shown an increasing trend.

=== Infrastructure ===
There are 136 inhabited villages in Manteswar CD block. All 136 villages (100%) have power supply. All 136 villages (100%) have drinking water supply. 44 villages (32.35%) have post offices. All 136 villages (100%) have telephones (including landlines, public call offices and mobile phones). 66 villages (45.83%) have a pucca (paved) approach road and 79 villages (58.09%) have transport communication (includes bus service, rail facility and navigable waterways). 29 villages (21.32%) have agricultural credit societies. 11 villages (8.09%) have banks.

In 2013–14, there were 70 fertiliser depots, 9 seed store and 78 fair price shops in the CD Block.

=== Agriculture ===
Persons engaged in agriculture
in Manteswar CD Block
1. Bargadars (4.68%)
2. Patta holders (15.5%)
3. Small farmers (8.17%)
4. Marginal farmers (24.7%)
5. Agricultural labourers (46.9%)

Although the Bargadari Act of 1950 recognised the rights of bargadars to a higher share of crops from the land that they tilled, it was not implemented fully. Large tracts, beyond the prescribed limit of land ceiling, remained with the rich landlords. From 1977 onwards major land reforms took place in West Bengal. Land in excess of land ceiling was acquired and distributed amongst the peasants. Following land reforms land ownership pattern has undergone transformation. In 2013–14, persons engaged in agriculture in Manteswar CD Block could be classified as follows: bargadars 4.68%, patta (document) holders 15.54%, small farmers (possessing land between 1 and 2 hectares) 8.17%, marginal farmers (possessing land up to 1 hectare) 24.71% and agricultural labourers 46.90%.

In 2003-04 net cropped area in Manteswar CD Block was 25.502 hectares and the area in which more than one crop was grown was 15,850 hectares.

In 2013–14, Manteswar CD Block produced 3,340 tonnes of Aman paddy, the main winter crop from 1,142 hectares, 731 tonnes of Aus paddy (summer crop) from 262 hectares, 91,570 tonnes of Boro paddy (spring crop) from 23,572 hectares, 15 tonnes of wheat from 5 hectares, 348 tonnes of jute from 16 hectares, 28,709 tonnes of potatoes from 1,206 hectares and 565 tonnes of sugar cane from 9 hectares. It also produced pulses and oilseeds.

In Bardhaman district as a whole Aman paddy constituted 64.32% of the total area under paddy cultivation, while the area under Boro and Aus paddy constituted 32.87% and 2.81% respectively. The expansion of Boro paddy cultivation, with higher yield rates, was the result of expansion of irrigation system and intensive cropping. In 2013–14, the total area irrigated in Manteswar CD Block was 29,266.87 hectares, out of which 26,808.20 hectares were irrigated by canal water, 984.34 hectares were irrigated by river lift irrigation and 1,474.33 hectares by deep tube wells.

=== Banking ===
In 2013–14, Manteswar CD Block had offices of 8 commercial banks and 3 gramin banks.

== Transport ==
Manteswar CD Block has 4 ferry services and 10 originating/terminating bus routes.

The Bardhaman-Katwa line, after conversion from narrow gauge to electrified broad gauge, was opened to the public on 12 January 2018.

State Highway 8 (West Bengal) running from Santaldi (in Purulia district) to Majhdia (in Nadia district) and State Highway 15 (West Bengal) running from Dainhat (in Bardhaman district) to Gadiara (in Howrah district) cross at Kusumgram in this block.

A bridge is located between Maldanga and Manteswar across the Khari river.

== Education ==
In 2013–14, Manteswar CD Block had 180 primary schools with 12,570 students, 28 high school with 18,652 students and 9 higher secondary schools with 8,712 students. Manteswar CD Block had 1 general college with 2,668 and 402 institutions for special and non-formal education with 17,969 students

As per the 2011 census, in Manteswar CD block, amongst the 136 inhabited villages, 3 villages did not have schools, 89 villages had two or more primary schools, 45 villages had at least 1 primary and 1 middle school and 38 villages had at least 1 middle and 1 secondary school.

More than 6,000 schools (in erstwhile Bardhaman district) serve cooked midday meal to more than 900,000 students.

Dr. Gourmohan Roy College was established at Manteswar in 1986.

The Imperial Institute of Design (IID), recognized by the Ministry of Micro, Small and Medium Enterprises, government of India, is located in Manteswar.

== Culture ==
Manteswar has a multi-cultural heritage.

== Healthcare ==
In 2014, Manteswar CD Block had 1 block primary health centre, 3 primary health centres and 1 private nursing home with total 47 beds and 5 doctors (excluding private bodies). It had 32 family welfare subcentres. 10,173 patients were treated indoor and 210,847 patients were treated outdoor in the hospitals, health centres and subcentres of the CD Block.

Manteswar Rural Hospital (with 30 beds plus a 20 bed maternity ward) is the main medical facility in Manteswar CD block. There are primary health centres at Dhanyakherur, PO Majhergram (with 10 beds), Moinampur, PO Katsihi (with 6 beds) and Putsuri (with 6 beds).

Manteswar CD Block is one of the areas of Bardhaman district which is affected by a low level of arsenic contamination of ground water.
