= Purbasthali I =

- Community development block
- Location in West Bengal
- Coordinates: 23°22′25″N 88°15′19″E
- Country: India
- State: West Bengal
- District: Purba Bardhaman
- Parliamentary constituency: Bardhaman Purba
- Assembly constituency: Purbasthali Dakshin, Purbasthali Uttar

Area
  - Total: 57.31 sq mi (148.44 km^{2})
- Elevation: 66 ft (20 m)

Population (2011)
  - Total: 206,977
  - Density: 3,611.3/sq mi (1,394.3/km^{2})
- Time zone: UTC+5.30 (IST)
- PIN: 713515 (Nadanghat)
- Telephone/STD code: 03454
- Vehicle registration: WB-37,WB-38,WB-41,WB-42,WB-44
- Literacy Rate: 77.59 per cent
- Website: http://purbabardhaman.gov.in/

Purbasthali I is a community development block that forms an administrative division in Kalna subdivision of Purba Bardhaman district in the Indian state of West Bengal.

== Geography ==
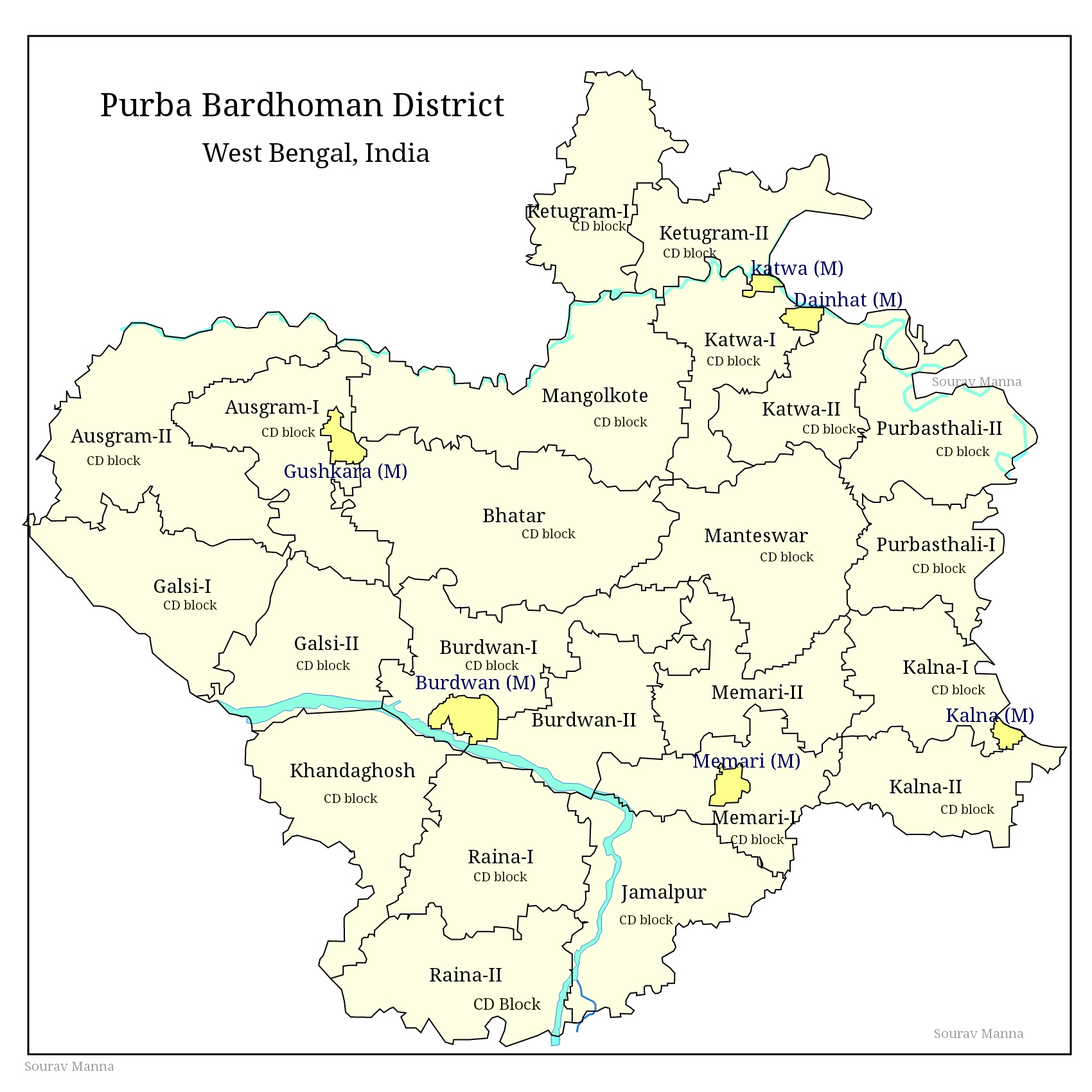
CD blocks of Purba Bardhaman district

=== Location ===
Nadanghat, a constituent panchayat of Purbasthali I block, is located at 23°22′25″N 88°15′19″E.

Purbasthali I CD Block is part of the Bhagirathi basin. The Bhagirathi forms the eastern boundary of the CD Block. The region has many swamps and water-logged areas. The soil is fertile, as it consists mainly of silt deposits.

Purbasthali I CD Block is bounded by Purbasthali II CD Block on the north, Nabadwip CD Block, in Nadia district across the Bhagirathi, on the east, Kalna I CD Block on the south and Manteswar CD Block on the west.

Purbasthali I CD Block has an area of 148.44 km^{2}. It has 1 panchayat samity, 7 gram panchayats, 154 gram sansads (village councils), 97 mouzas and 91 inhabited villages. Nadanghat and Purbasthali police stations serve this block. Headquarters of this CD Block is at Srirampur.

Gram panchayats of Purbasthali I block/panchayat samiti are: Bogpur, Dogachia, Jahannagar, Nadanghat, Nasratpur, Samudragarh and Srirampur.

== Demographics ==
=== Population ===
As per the 2011 Census of India Purbasthali I CD Block had a total population of 206,977, of which 153,703 were rural and 53,274 were urban. There were 107,022 (52%) males and 99,955 (48%) females. Population below 6 years was 21,828. Scheduled Castes numbered 52,705 (25.46%) and Scheduled Tribes numbered 7,608 (3.68%).

As per the 2001 census, Purbasthali I block had a total population of 183,041, out of which 94,377 were males and 88,664 were females. Purbasthali I block registered a population growth of 20.45 per cent during the 1991-2001 decade. Decadal growth for Bardhaman district was 14.36 per cent. Decadal growth in West Bengal was 17.84 per cent. Scheduled castes at 48,544 formed around one-fourth the population. Scheduled tribes numbered 6,901.

Census Towns in Purbasthali I CD Block are (2011 census figures in brackets): Srirampur (19,830), Hatsimla (7,141), Jaluidanga (4,571), Gopinathpur (4,688) and Nasratpur (17,044).

Large villages (with 4,000+ population) in Purbasthali I CD Block are (2011 census figures in brackets): Dogachhia (5,910), Champahati (6,694), Kobla (4,117) and Samudragarh (13,089).

Other villages in Purbasthali I CD Block included (2011 census figures in brackets): Bagpur (1,696), Jahan Nagar (3,106) and Nadanghat (3,799).

=== Literacy ===
As per the 2011 census the total number of literates in Purbasthali I CD Block was 143,651 (77.59% of the population over 6 years) out of which males numbered 79,634 (83.05% of the male population over 6 years) and females numbered 64,017 (71.72% of the female population over 6 years). The gender disparity (the difference between female and male literacy rates) was 11.33%.

As per 2001 census, Purbasthali I block had a total literacy of 69.54 per cent for the 6+ age group. While male literacy was 77.73 per cent female literacy was 60.75 per cent. Bardhaman district had a total literacy of 70.18 per cent, male literacy being 78.63 per cent and female literacy being 60.95 per cent.

See also – List of West Bengal districts ranked by literacy rate

Literacy in CD blocks of
Bardhaman district
Bardhaman Sadar North subdivision
Ausgram I – 69.39%
Ausgram II – 68.00%
Bhatar – 71.56%
Burdwan I – 76.07%
Burdwan II – 74.12%
Galsi II – 70.05%
Bardhaman Sadar South subdivision
Khandaghosh – 77.28%
Raina I – 80.20%
Raina II – 81.48%
Jamalpur – 74.08%
Memari I – 74.10%
Memari II – 74.59%
Kalna subdivision
Kalna I – 75.81%
Kalna II – 76.25%
Manteswar – 73.08%
Purbasthali I – 77.59%
Purbasthali II – 70.35%
Katwa subdivision
Katwa I – 70.36%
Katwa II – 69.16%
Ketugram I – 68.00%
Ketugram II – 65.96%
Mongalkote – 67.97%
Durgapur subdivision
Andal – 77.25%
Faridpur Durgapur – 74.14%
Galsi I – 72.81%
Kanksa – 76.34%
Pandabeswar – 73.01%
Asansol subdivision
Barabani – 69.58%
Jamuria – 69.42%
Raniganj – 73.86%
Salanpur – 78.76%
2011 Census: CD Block Wise

Primary Census Abstract Data

=== Languages and religion ===
Religion in Purbasthali I CD block (2011)
Hinduism	74.70%
Islam	24.95%
Other or not stated	0.35%

In the 2011 census Hindus numbered 154,616 and formed 74.70% of the population in Purbasthali I CD Block. Muslims numbered 51,647 and formed 24.95% of the population. Christians numbered 418 and formed 0.20% of the population. Others numbered 296 and formed 0.14% of the population.

In Bardhaman district the percentage of Hindu population has been declining from 84.3% in 1961 to 77.9% in 2011 and the percentage of Muslim population has increased from 15.2% in 1961 to 20.7% in 2011.

Languages of Purbasthali I CD block (2011)
1. Bengali (97.4%)
2. Santali (1.82%)
3. Others (0.80%)

At the time of the 2011 census, 97.38% of the population spoke Bengali and 1.82% Santali as their first language.

== Rural poverty ==
As per poverty estimates obtained from household survey for families living below poverty line in 2005, rural poverty in Purbasthali I CD Block was 48.16%.

== Economy ==
=== Livelihood ===
In Purbasthali I CD Block in 2011, amongst the class of total workers, cultivators formed 11.51%, agricultural labourers 28.43%, household industry workers 23.23% and other workers 36.84%.

Purbasthali I CD Block is part of the area where agriculture dominates the scenario but the secondary and tertiary sectors have shown an increasing trend.

=== Infrastructure ===
There are 91 inhabited villages in Purbasthali I CD block. All 91 villages (100%) have power supply. All 91 villages (100%) have drinking water supply. 9 villages (9.89%) have post offices. All 91 villages (100%) have telephones (including landlines, public call offices and mobile phones). 54 villages (59.34%) have a pucca (paved) approach road and 46 villages (50.55%) have transport communication (includes bus service, rail facility and navigable waterways). 24 villages (26.37%) have agricultural credit societies. 9 villages (9.89%) have banks.

In 2013-14, there were 82 fertiliser depots, 15 seed store and 47 fair price shops in the CD Block.

=== Agriculture ===
Persons engaged in agriculture
in Purbasthali I CD Block
1. Bargadars (6.81%)
2. Patta holders (15.0%)
3. Small farmers (5.03%)
4. Marginal farmers (19.9%)
5. Agricultural labourers (53.3%)

Although the Bargadari Act of 1950 recognised the rights of bargadars to a higher share of crops from the land that they tilled, it was not implemented fully. Large tracts, beyond the prescribed limit of land ceiling, remained with the rich landlords. From 1977 onwards major land reforms took place in West Bengal. Land in excess of land ceiling was acquired and distributed amongst the peasants. Following land reforms land ownership pattern has undergone transformation. In 2013-14, persons engaged in agriculture in Purbasthali I CD Block could be classified as follows: bargadars 6.81%, patta (document) holders 14.96%, small farmers (possessing land between 1 and 2 hectares) 5.03%, marginal farmers (possessing land up to 1 hectare) 19.93% and agricultural labourers 53.28%.

In 2003-04 net cropped area in Purbasthali I CD Block was 12,340 hectares and the area in which more than one crop was grown was 9,005 hectares.

In 2013-14, Purbasthali I CD Block produced 26,588 tonnes of Aman paddy, the main winter crop from 8,741 hectares, 25.073 tonnes of Boro paddy (spring crop) from 7,159 hectares, 669 tonnes of wheat from 60 hectares, 35,103 tonnes of jute from 1,572 hectares and 1,649 tonnes of potatoes from 247 hectares. It also produced pulses and oilseeds.

In 2013-14, the total area irrigated in Purbasthali I CD Block was 5,214.51 hectares, out of which 2,759.62 hectares were irrigated by river lift irrigation and 2,454.89 hectares by deep tube wells.

=== Weaving ===
With the partition of India many skilled weavers from Dhaka settled around Santipur in Nadia district and Ambika Kalna in Bardhaman district, both with long traditions in weaving and the entire weaving belt spread across Santipur, Phulia, Samudragarh, Dhatrigram and Ambika Kalna, produces quality products in designs and colours.

=== Banking ===
In 2013-14, Purbasthali I CD Block had offices of 6 commercial banks and 2 gramin banks.

== Transport ==
Purbasthali I CD Block has 5 ferry services and 7 originating/ terminating bus routes.

The Bandel-Katwa branch line passes through this CD Block.

State Highway 6 (West Bengal) running from Rajnagar (in Birbhum district) to Alampur (in Howrah district) and State Highway 8 (West Bengal) running from Santaldi (in Purulia district) to Majhdia (in Nadia district) crosses in this block.

== Education ==
In 2013-14, Purbasthali I CD Block had 115 primary schools with 10,596 students, 11 middle schools with 1,040 students, 11 high school with 8,132 students and 8 higher secondary schools with 13,024 students. Purbasthali CD Block had 1 technical/ professional institution with 100 and 330 institutions for special and non-formal education with 13,342 students

As per the 2011 census, in Purbasthali I CD block, amongst the 91 inhabited villages, 3 villages did not have a school, 28 villages had two or more primary schools, 20 villages had at least 1 primary and 1 middle school and 11 villages had at least 1 middle and 1 secondary school.

More than 6,000 schools (in erstwhile Bardhaman district) serve cooked midday meal to more than 900,000 students.

== Healthcare ==
In 2014, Purbasthali I CD Block had 1 rural hospital and 3 primary health centres with total 44 beds and 4 doctors (excluding private bodies). It had 23 family welfare subcentres. 2,024 patients were treated indoor and 191,414 patients were treated outdoor in the hospitals, health centres and subcentres of the CD Block.

Srirampur Rural Hospital at Srirampur, PO Vidyanagar (with 30 beds) is the main medical facility in Purbasthali I CD block. There are primary health centres at Dogachhia, PO Rai Dogachhia (with 4 beds), Nadanghat (with 10 beds) and Nowapara (with 4 beds).

Purbasthali I CD Block is one of the areas of Bardhaman district which is affected by high levels of arsenic contamination of ground water.
