= Kalna I =

- Community development block
- Location in West Bengal
- Coordinates: 23°13′00″N 88°22′00″E
- Country: India
- State: West Bengal
- District: Purba Bardhaman
- Parliamentary constituency: Bardhaman Purba
- Assembly constituency: Kalna, Purbasthali Dakshin

Area
  - Total: 169.08 km^{2} (65.28 sq mi)
- Elevation: 12 m (39 ft)

Population (2011)
  - Total: 206,945
  - Density: 1,223.9/km^{2} (3,170.0/sq mi)
- Time zone: UTC+5.30 (IST)
- PIN: 713409 (Kalna); 713405 (Dhatrigram)
- Telephone/STD code: 03454
- Vehicle registration: WB-37,WB-38,WB-41,WB-42,WB-44
- Literacy Rate: 75.81 per cent
- Website: http://purbabardhaman.wb.gov.in/

Kalna I is a community development block that forms an administrative division in Kalna subdivision of Purba Bardhaman district in the Indian state of West Bengal.

== Geography ==
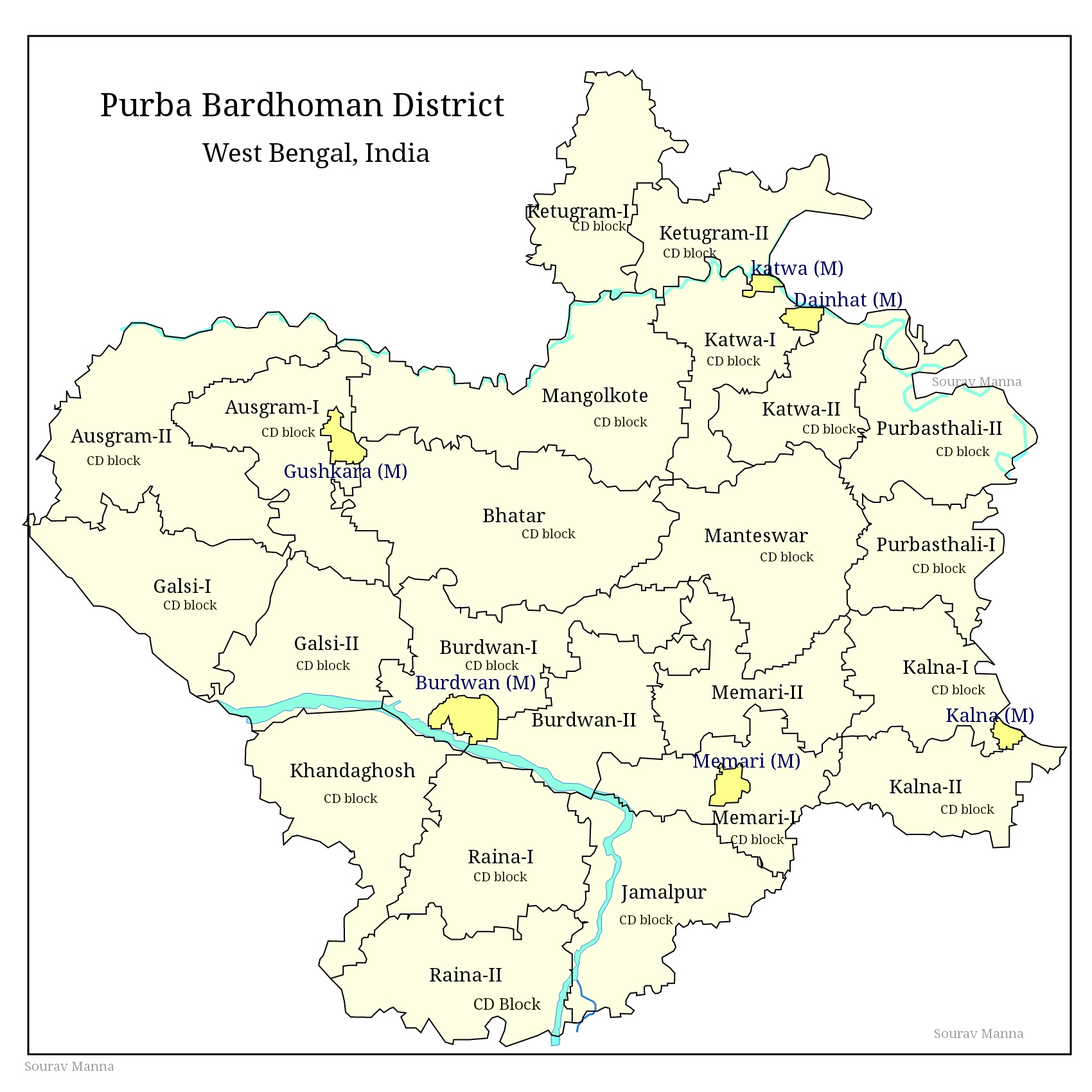
CD blocks of Purba Bardhaman district

=== Location ===
Kalna is located at 23°13′N 88°22′E.

Kalna I CD Block is part of the Bhagirathi basin. The Bhagirathi forms the eastern boundary of the CD Block. The region has many swamps and water-logged areas. The soil is fertile, as it consists mainly of silt deposits.

Kalna I CD Block is bounded by Purbasthali I CD Block on the north, Santipur CD Block, in Nadia district across the Bhagirathi, on the east, Kalna II CD Block on the south and Memari II CD Block on the west.

Kalna I CD Block has an area of 169.08 km^{2}. It has 1 panchayat samity, 9 gram panchayats, 154 gram sansads (village councils), 100 mouzas and 98 inhabited villages. Kalna police station serves this block. Headquarters of this CD Block is at Rangapara.

Gram panchayats of Kalna I block/panchayat samiti are: Atghoria-Simlon, Bagnapara, Begpur, Dhatrigram, Hat-Kalna, Kankuria, Krishnadebpur, Nandai and Sultanpur.

== Demographics ==
=== Population ===
As per the 2011 Census of India Kalna I CD Block had a total population of 206,945, of which 186,138 were rural and 20,807 were urban. There were 105,696 (51%) males and 101,294 (49%) females. Population below 6 years was 20,853. Scheduled Castes numbered 59,242 (28.63%) and Scheduled Tribes numbered 20,962 (10.13%).

As per 2001 census, Kalna I block had a total population of 190,687, out of which 97,903 were males and 92,784 were females. Kalna I block registered a population growth of 21.40 per cent during the 1991-2001 decade. Decadal growth for Bardhaman district was 14.36 per cent. Decadal growth in West Bengal was 17.84 per cent. Scheduled castes at 58,225 formed around one-third the population. Scheduled tribes numbered 21,222.

Census Towns in Kalna I CD Block are (2011 census figures in brackets): Dhatrigram (9,955), Piarinagar (3,678) and Uttar Goara (7,178).

Large villages (with 4,000+ population) in Kalna I CD Block are (2011 census figures in brackets): Nandai (8,406), Gramkalna (11,973), Briddhapara (5,525), Radhanagar (5,984), Krishnadebpur (13,665) and Hatkalna (4,196).

Other villages in Kalna I CD Block include (2011census figures in brackets): Atgharia (2,188), Simlon (3,908), Begpur (1,354), Sultanpur (1,304), Kakuria (3,206)

=== Literacy ===
As per the 2011 census the total number of literates in Kalna I CD Block was 141,069 (75.81% of the population over 6 years) out of which males numbered 78,164 (82.15% of the male population over 6 years) and females numbered 62,905 (69.14% of the female population over 6 years). The gender disparity (the difference between female and male literacy rates) was 13.01%.

As per 2001 census, Kalna I block had a total literacy of 66.45 per cent for the 6+ age group. While male literacy was 75.23 per cent female literacy was 57.16 per cent. Bardhaman district had a total literacy of 70.18 per cent, male literacy being 78.63 per cent and female literacy being 60.95 per cent.

See also – List of West Bengal districts ranked by literacy rate

Literacy in CD blocks of
Bardhaman district
Bardhaman Sadar North subdivision
Ausgram I – 69.39%
Ausgram II – 68.00%
Bhatar – 71.56%
Burdwan I – 76.07%
Burdwan II – 74.12%
Galsi II – 70.05%
Bardhaman Sadar South subdivision
Khandaghosh – 77.28%
Raina I – 80.20%
Raina II – 81.48%
Jamalpur – 74.08%
Memari I – 74.10%
Memari II – 74.59%
Kalna subdivision
Kalna I – 75.81%
Kalna II – 76.25%
Manteswar – 73.08%
Purbasthali I – 77.59%
Purbasthali II – 70.35%
Katwa subdivision
Katwa I – 70.36%
Katwa II – 69.16%
Ketugram I – 68.00%
Ketugram II – 65.96%
Mongalkote – 67.97%
Durgapur subdivision
Andal – 77.25%
Faridpur Durgapur – 74.14%
Galsi I – 72.81%
Kanksa – 76.34%
Pandabeswar – 73.01%
Asansol subdivision
Barabani – 69.58%
Jamuria – 69.42%
Raniganj – 73.86%
Salanpur – 78.76%
2011 Census: CD Block Wise

Primary Census Abstract Data

=== Languages and religion ===
Religion in Kalna I CD block (2011)
Hinduism	68.60%
Islam	29.00%
Sarna	1.99%
Other or not stated	0.41%

In the 2011 census Hindus numbered 141,970 and formed 68.60% of the population in Kalna I CD Block. Muslims numbered 60,006 and formed 29.00% of the population. Christians numbered 255 and formed 0.12% of the population. Others numbered 4,714 and formed 2.28% of the population.

In Bardhaman district the percentage of Hindu population has been declining from 84.3% in 1961 to 77.9% in 2011 and the percentage of Muslim population has increased from 15.2% in 1961 to 20.7% in 2011.

Languages of Kalna I CD block (2011)
1. Bengali (91.1%)
2. Santali (8.12%)
3. Others (0.81%)

At the time of the 2011 census, 91.07% of the population spoke Bengali and 8.12% Santali as their first language.

== Rural poverty ==
As per poverty estimates obtained from household survey for families living below poverty line in 2005, rural poverty in Kalna I CD Block was 40.99%.

== Economy ==
=== Livelihood ===
In Kalna I CD Block in 2011, amongst the class of total workers, cultivators formed 15.15%, agricultural labourers 47.03%, household industry workers 9.34% and other workers 28.48%.

Kalna I CD Block is part of the area where agriculture dominates the scenario but the secondary and tertiary sectors have shown an increasing trend.

=== Infrastructure ===
There are 98 inhabited villages in Kalna I CD block. All 98 villages (100%) have power supply. All 98 villages (100%) have drinking water supply. 21 villages (21.43%) have post offices. 93 villages (94.90%) have telephones (including landlines, public call offices and mobile phones). 37 villages (37.76%) have a pucca (paved) approach road and 60 villages (61.22%) have transport communication (includes bus service, rail facility and navigable waterways). 32 villages (32.65%) have agricultural credit societies. 14 villages (14.29%) have banks.

In 2013-14. There were 77 fertiliser depots, 14 seed stores and 52 fair price shops in the CD Block.

=== Agriculture ===
Persons engaged in agriculture
in Kalna I CD Block
1. Bargadars (6.60%)
2. Patta holders (14.9%)
3. Small farmers (5.10%)
4. Marginal farmers (17.6%)
5. Agricultural labourers (55.8%)

Although the Bargadari Act of 1950 recognised the rights of bargadars to a higher share of crops from the land that they tilled, it was not implemented fully. Large tracts, beyond the prescribed limit of land ceiling, remained with the rich landlords. From 1977 onwards major land reforms took place in West Bengal. Land in excess of land ceiling was acquired and distributed amongst the peasants. Following land reforms land ownership pattern has undergone transformation. In 2013–14, persons engaged in agriculture Kalna I could be classified as follows: bargadars 6.60%, patta (document) holders 14.87%, small farmers (possessing land between 1 and 2 hectares) 5.10%, marginal farmers (possessing land up to 1 hectare) 17.65% and agricultural labourers 55.78%.

In 2003-04 net cropped area in Kalna I Block was 14,068 hectares and the area in which more than one crop was grown was 11,348 hectares.

In 2013–14, Kalna I CD Block produced 36,365 tonnes of Aman paddy, the main winter crop, from 11,875 hectares, 20,786 tonnes of Boro paddy (spring crop) from 5,285 hectares, 23,084 tonnes of jute from 1,045 hectares and 23,876 tonnes of potatoes from 2,376 hectares. It also produced pulses and oilseeds.

In Bardhaman district as a whole Aman paddy constituted 64.32% of the total area under paddy cultivation, while the area under Boro and Aus paddy constituted 32.87% and 2.81% respectively. The expansion of Boro paddy cultivation, with higher yield rates, was the result of expansion of irrigation system and intensive cropping. In 2013–14, the total area irrigated in Kalna I CD Block was 11,050.53 hectares, out of which 6,489.00 hectares were irrigated by canal water, 2,255.81 hectares by river lift irrigation and 2,305.72 hectares by deep tube wells.

=== Weaving ===
Following the partition of India, many skilled weavers from Dhaka settled around Santipur in Nadia district and Ambika Kalna in Bardhaman district, two districts with long traditions in weaving. These districts are part of the "weaving belt" spanning Santipur, Phulia, Samudragarh, Dhatrigram and Ambika Kalna, a region known for its production and distribution of specialized handloom products via regional markets.

=== Banking ===
In 2013–14, Kalna I CD Block had offices of 6 commercial banks and 2 gramin banks.

== Transport ==
Kalna I CD Block has 6 ferry services and 13 originating/ terminating bus routes.

The Bandel-Katwa branch line passes through this CD Block and there are stations at Dhatrigram and Ambika Kalna.

State Highway 6 (West Bengal) running from Rajnagar (in Birbhum district) to Alampur (in Howrah district) passes through this block.

== Education ==
In 2013–14, Kalna I CD Block had 112 primary schools with 9,703 students, 11 high schools with 10,220 students and 11 higher secondary schools with 12,310 students. Kalna I CD Block had 353 institutions for special and non-formal education with 12,046 students. Kalna (municipality), outside the CD Block area, had 2 general college with 4,866 students.

As per the 2011 census, in Kalna I CD block, amongst the 98 inhabited villages, 5 villages did not have schools, 36 villages had two or more primary schools, 23 villages had at least 1 primary and 1 middle school and 17 villages had at least 1 middle and 1 secondary school.

More than 6,000 schools (in erstwhile Bardhaman district) serve cooked midday meal to more than 900,000 students.

== Healthcare ==
In 2014, Kalna I CD Block had 1 block primary health centre and 3 primary health centres with total 36 beds and 4 doctors (excluding private bodies). It had 22 family welfare subcentres. 1,954 patients were treated indoor and 157,631 patients were treated outdoor in the hospitals, health centres and subcentres of the CD Block.

Atgharia Rural Hospital at Atgharia (with 30 beds) is the main medical facility in Kalna I CD block. There are primary health centres at Baghnapara (with 10 beds), Sahajpur (with 6 beds) and Sultanpur (with 10 beds).

Kalna I CD Block is one of the areas of Bardhaman district which is affected by a moderately high level of arsenic contamination of ground water.
