= Srirampur, Burdwan =

Srirampur
- Census Town
- Location in West Bengal, India Srirampur (India)
- Coordinates: 23.4056°N 88.3382°E
- Country: India
- State: West Bengal
- District: Purba Bardhaman

Area
  - Total: 1.4 km^{2} (0.54 sq mi)
- Elevation: 19 m (62 ft)

Population (2011)
  - Total: 19,830
  - Density: 14,000/km^{2} (37,000/sq mi)

Languages
  - Official: Bengali, English
- Time zone: UTC+5:30 (IST)
- Vehicle registration: WB
- Website: purbabardhaman.gov.in

Srirampur is a census town in Purbasthali I CD Block in Kalna subdivision of Purba Bardhaman in the Indian state of West Bengal.

== Geography ==
Cities and towns in the Kalna subdivision of Purba Bardhaman district
M: municipal city/ town, CT: census town, R: rural/ urban centre, H: historical/ religious place, C: craft centre.
Owing to space constraints in the small map, the actual locations in a larger map may vary slightly

=== Location ===
Srirampur is located at 23.4056°N 88.3382°E. It has an average elevation of 19 metres (62 feet).

It is located between the Bhagirathi, Ajay and Damodar rivers. Temperatures in this region varies from 17-18 °C in winter to 30-32 °C in summer. it is on the banks of Balluka river, which then joins the Behula and flows into the Bhagirathi.

=== CD block HQ ===
The headquarters of Purbasthali I CD block are located at Srirampur.

=== Urbanisation ===
87.00% of the population of Kalna subdivision live in the rural areas. Only 13.00% of the population live in the urban areas. The map alongside presents some of the notable locations in the subdivision. All places marked in the map are linked in the larger full screen map.

== Demographics ==
As per the 2011 Census of India Srirampur had a total population of 19,830, of which 10,181 (51%) were males and 9,649 (49%) were females. Population below 6 years was 1,728. The total number of literates in Srirampur was 15,218 (84.07% of the population over 6 years).

As of 2001 India census, Srirampur had a population of 17,715. Males constitute 51% of the population and females 49%. Srirampur has an average literacy rate of 70%, higher than the national average of 59.5%: male literacy is 77%, and female literacy is 63%. In Srirampur, 11% of the population is under 6 years of age.

== Infrastructure ==
As per the District Census Handbook 2011, Srirampur covered an area of 1.4 km^{2}. It had 15 km roads. Amongst the medical facilities, the nearest nursing home was 3 km away and the nearest veterinary hospital was 23 km away. Amongst the educational facilities it had were 11 primary schools and 1 middle school. The nearest secondary school was at Samudragarh 4 km away.

== Education ==
Srirampur has eight primary and two secondary schools.

== People ==
The two main poets of Dharmamngal kavya, Rupram Chakraborty and Ghanaram Chakraborty belong to Srirampur.

== Healthcare ==
Srirampur Rural Hospital at Srirampur, PO Vidyanagar (with 30 beds) is the main medical facility in Purbasthali I CD block. There are primary health centres at Dogachhia, PO Rai Dogachhia (with 4 beds), Nadanghat (with 10 beds) and Nowapara (with 4 beds).

See also - Healthcare in West Bengal
