= Kaigram =

Coordinates: 23.416943°N 88.18305°E

- Village
- Interactive map of Kaigram
- Country: India
- State: West Bengal
- District: Purba Bardhaman

Population (2011)
  - Total: 1,719

Languages
  - Official: Bengali, English
- Time zone: UTC+5:30 (IST)
- PIN: 713145
- ISO 3166 code: IN-WB
- Vehicle registration: WB
- Website: wb.gov.in

Kaigram is a village in Manteswar CD block in Kalna subdivision of Purba Bardhaman district of West Bengal, India.

== Demographics ==
As per the 2011 Census of India Kaigram had a total population of 1,719, of which 881 (51%) were males and 838 (49%) were females. Population below 6 years was 177. The total number of literates in Kaigram was 1,263 (81.91% of the population over 6 years).

== Education ==
It is the location of Kaigram High School.
