= Imperial Institute of Design =

Design school in Monteswar, India

Coordinates: 23°24′55.28″N 88°06′28.10″E

IID (Imperial Institute of Design)
- Type: Autonomous National Institution
- Affiliations: Ministry of Micro, Small and Medium Enterprises
- Location: Monteswar, West Bengal, India
- Campus: Urban
- Website: www.iid.edu.in

The IID (Imperial Institute of Design) is a design school in Monteswar, Purba Bardhaman district, West Bengal, India. The institute functions as an autonomous body certified under the Department of Industrial Policy and Promotion, Ministry of Commerce and Industry, Government of India. IID is registered & recognised by the Ministry of Micro, Small and Medium Enterprises, government of India.

== Accreditation ==
IID is recognized by DIPP (Department of Industrial Policy and Promotion) under National Design Policy under the Design Clinic Scheme project being implemented across the country is intended to improve the manufacturing competency of the MSMEs through design intervention to their products and services and to provide them design edge in the global market and hence supports the MAKE IN INDIA programme of the Government of India. the Ministry of Micro, Small and Medium Enterprises (MSME). IID is also affiliated with NIELIT (National Institute of Electronics & Information Technology), associated with the Ministry of Electronics and Information Technology of the Government of India.
