= Ramnagar, Kulti =

Neighborhood in Asansol, West Bengal, India

Ramnagar Ramnagore
- Neighborhood in Asansol
- Location in West Bengal, India Ramnagar (India)
- Coordinates: 23.74485°N 86.831375°E
- Country: India
- State: West Bengal
- District: Paschim Bardhaman
- City: Asansol

Population (2001)
  - Total: 4,926
- Demonym: Asansolians / Asansolites/ Asansolbashi

Languages
  - Official: Bengali, English
- Time zone: UTC+5:30 (IST)
- Website: paschimbardhaman.co.in

Ramnagar (also spelt Ramnagore) is a locality of Asansol Municipal Corporation, in the Paschim Bardhaman district in the Indian state of West Bengal. It is known for the Ramnagar colliery, once a captive mine of IISCO, and now part of Steel Authority of India Limited. Ramnagar is close by to the Barakar River, with temperatures ranging from 8°C in the winter to 45°C in the summer.

== Geography ==
Ramnagar is located at 23°44′41″N 86°49′53″E.

=== Asansol Municipal Corporation ===
According to the Kolkata Gazette notification of 3 June 2015, the municipal areas of Kulti, Raniganj and Jamuria were included within the jurisdiction of Asansol Municipal Corporation.
