= Samudragarh railway station =

Railway station in West Bengal, India

Samudragarh
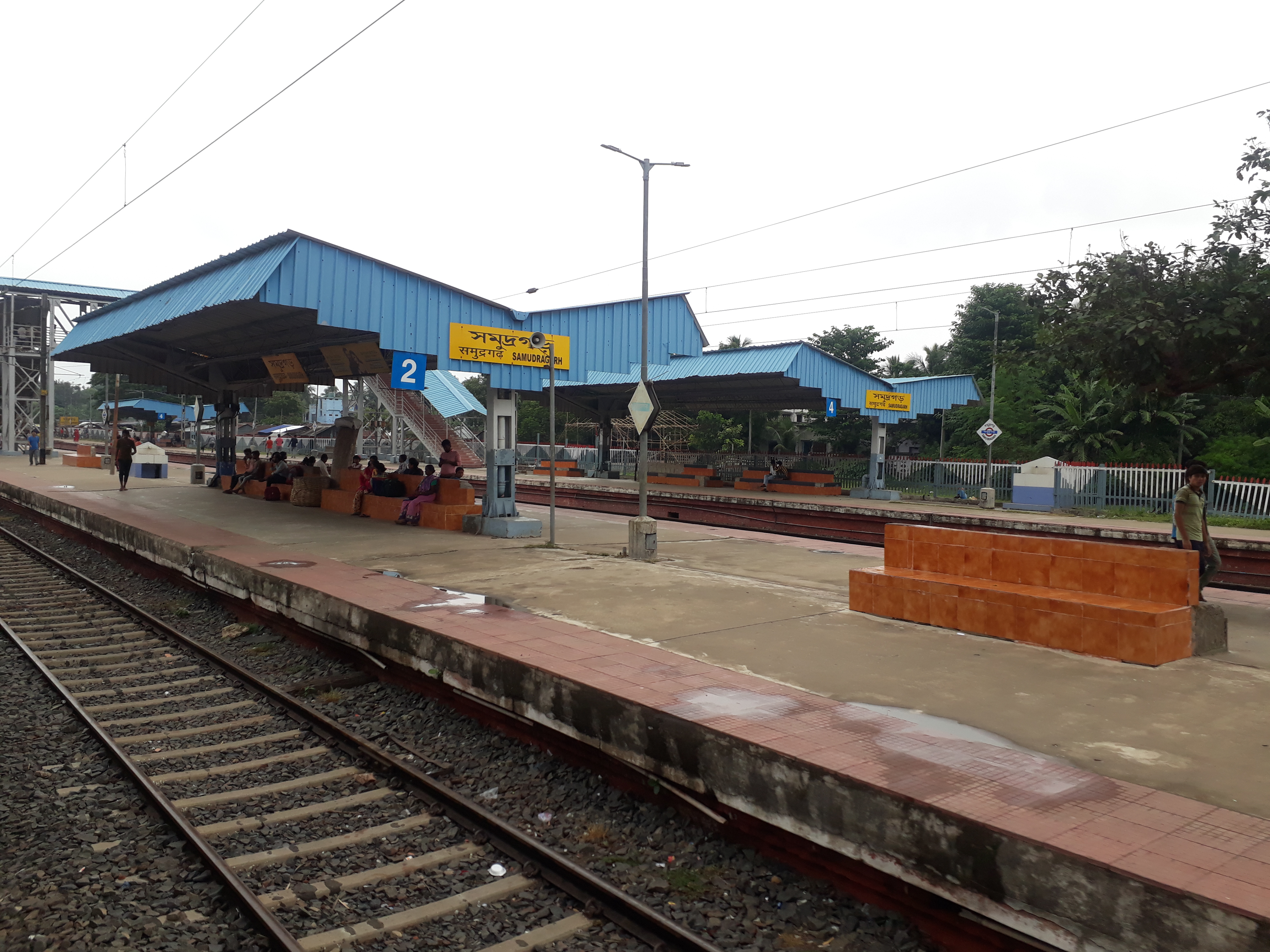
- Samudragarh railway station

General information
- Location: State Highway 6, Hatsimla, Samudragarh, Purba Bardhaman district, West Bengal; India
- Coordinates: 23.335321°N 88.324707°E
- Elevation: 16 m (52 ft)
- System: Indian Railways station and Kolkata Suburban Railway station
- Owner: Indian Railways
- Operator: Eastern Railway
- Platforms: 4
- Tracks: 2

Construction
- Structure type: Standard (on ground station)
- Parking: No
- Cycle facilities: No

Other information
- Status: Functioning
- Station code: SMAE
- Zone(s): Eastern Railway
- Division(s): Howrah

Services
Preceding station	Kolkata Suburban Railway	Following station
Nandaigram Halt towards Howrah Junction	Eastern Line Bandel–Katwa line	Kalinagar towards Katwa Junction
Route map
Location
- Location within West Bengal Location within India

Samudragarh railway station is a railway station on Bandel–Katwa line connecting from Bandel to Katwa, and under the jurisdiction of Howrah railway division of Eastern Railway zone. It is situated beside State Highway 6, Hatsimla, Samudragarh, Purba Bardhaman district in the Indian state of West Bengal. Number of EMU and few Passenger trains stop at Samudragarh railway station. The distance between Howrah and Samudragarh railway station is approximately 97 km.

== History ==
The Hooghly–Katwa Railway constructed a line from Bandel to Katwa in 1913. This line including Samudragarh railway station was electrified in 1994–1996 with 25 kV overhead line.
