= Uttar Goara =

- Census Town
- Location in West Bengal, India Uttar Goara (India)
- Coordinates: 23.2345°N 88.3393°E
- Country: India
- State: West Bengal
- District: Purba Bardhaman

Area
  - Total: 1.61 km^{2} (0.62 sq mi)

Population (2011)
  - Total: 7,178
  - Density: 4,460/km^{2} (11,500/sq mi)

Languages
  - Official: Bengali, English
- Time zone: UTC+5:30 (IST)
- Vehicle registration: WB
- Website: purbabardhaman.gov.in

Uttar Goara is a census town in Kalna I CD Block in Kalna subdivision of Purba Bardhaman district in the Indian state of West Bengal.

== Geography ==
Cities and towns in the Kalna subdivision of Purba Bardhaman district
M: municipal city/ town, CT: census town, R: rural/ urban centre, H: historical/ religious centre, C: craft centre.
Owing to space constraints in the small map, the actual locations in a larger map may vary slightly

=== Location ===
Uttar Goara is located on the agriculturally rich alluvial plains between the Bhagirathi, Ajay and Damodar rivers. Temperatures in this region varies from 17-18 °C in winter to 30-32 °C in summer.

=== Urbanisation ===
87.00% of the population of Kalna subdivision live in the rural areas. Only 13.00% of the population live in the urban areas. The map alongside presents some of the notable locations in the subdivision. All places marked in the map are linked in the larger full screen map.

== Demographics ==
As per the 2011 Census of India Uttar Goara had a total population of 7,178, of which 3,717 (52%) were males and 3,461 (48%) were females. Population below 6 years was 658. The total number of literates in Uttar Goara was 5,257 (80.63% of the population over 6 years).

As of 2001 India census, Uttar Goara had a population of 6,972. Males constitute 51% of the population and females 49%. Uttar Goara has an average literacy rate of 63%, higher than the national average of 59.5%: male literacy is 71%, and female literacy is 55%. In Uttar Goara, 12% of the population is under 6 years of age.

== Infrastructure ==
As per the District Census Handbook 2011, Uttar Goara covered an area of 1.61 km^{2}. It had 5 km roads. Amongst the medical facilities, the nearest nursing home was 1 km away and the nearest veterinary hospital was 1 km away. It had 3 primary schools. The nearest secondary and senior secondary schools were 1.5 km away at Nibhuji.

== Education ==
Uttar Goara has one primary school.
