= Panchkula, Purba Bardhaman =

Panchkula
- village
- Location in West Bengal, India Panchkula (India)
- Coordinates: 23.357484°N 87.811296°E
- Country: India
- State: West Bengal

Government
  - Body: Gram panchayat

Languages
  - Official: Bengali, English
- Time zone: UTC+5:30 (IST)
- ISO 3166 code: IN-WB
- Website: purbabardhaman.gov.in

The village of Panchkula is in the Purba Bardhaman district, West Bengal. The village consists of a small primary school named "Panchkula Prathamik Vidhaylay", a small health center, a post office and two famous temples named Chandrai Dharmaraj Temple and the Hara-gouri Temple. A river called Khari Nadi passes nearby the village. Haldar Road is the major roadway that connects Panchkula to other villages like Pathar Pukur, Jagdabad and Pilkhuri.

Bus service is available from the village to the city Bardhaman; however, as the road is made up of red soil, it has to be repaired after every year.

Other facilities such as drinking water, electricity and telephonic facilities are also available in Panchkula, but there are no water taps and the electricity creates a problem for the villagers as their agricultural irrigation totally depends on large pumps called Sub-Marshals.

The village's primary school has seen some development such as more emphasis given to the studies and more students from the lower section of society joining the school. The school has also been taken under the Sarwa Siksha Abhiyaan scheme.

== Festivals of Panchkula and Pilkhuri ==
Every year major festivals are organized in Panchkula and Pilkhuri. The oldest festival of the village is Pitambari Puja, which takes place in July in the Pitambari Temple. During this festival season, relatives, friends and visitors from different villages come to Pilkhuri. The devotion of Lord Pitambari in the village is almost 500 years old.

The major festival of Panchkula is Dharmarajer Gajan during May and June.
