= Hatsimla =

- Census Town
- Location in West Bengal, India Hatsimla (India)
- Coordinates: 23.3418°N 88.3256°E
- Country: India
- State: West Bengal
- District: Purba Bardhaman

Area
  - Total: 2.17 km^{2} (0.84 sq mi)

Population (2011)
  - Total: 7,141
  - Density: 3,290/km^{2} (8,520/sq mi)

Languages
  - Official: Bengali, English
- Time zone: UTC+5:30 (IST)
- PIN: 713519
- Vehicle registration: WB
- Website: purbabardhaman.gov.in

Hatsimla is a census town in Purbasthali I CD Block in Kalna subdivision of Purba Bardhaman district in the Indian state of West Bengal.

== Geography ==
Cities and towns in the Kalna subdivision of Purba Bardhaman district
M: municipal city/ town, CT: census town, R: rural/ urban centre, H: historical/ religious centre, C: craft centre.
Owing to space constraints in the small map, the actual locations in a larger map may vary slightly

=== Location ===
Hatsimla is located at 23.3418°N 88.3256°E.

Hatsimla is also shown in the map of Purbasthali I CD block in the District Census Handbook.

Hatsimla is located on the agriculturally rich alluvial plains between the Bhagirathi, Ajay and Damodar rivers. Temperatures in this region vary from 17 to 18 °C in winter to 30-32 °C in summer.

=== Urbanisation ===
87.00% of the population of Kalna subdivision live in the rural areas. Only 13.00% of the population live in the urban areas. The map alongside presents some of the notable locations in the subdivision. All places marked in the map are linked in the larger full screen map.

== Demographics ==
As per the 2011 Census of India Hatsimla had a total population of 7,141, of which 3,727 (52%) were males and 3,414 (48%) were females. Population below 6 years was 731. The total number of literates in Hatsimla was 5,415 (84.07% of the population over 6 years).

As of 2001 India census, Hatsimla had a population of 6,175. Males constitute 54% of the population and females 46%. Hatsimla has an average literacy rate of 69%, higher than the national average of 59.5%: male literacy is 75%, and female literacy is 61%. In Hatsimla, 12% of the population is under 6 years of age.

== Infrastructure ==
As per the District Census Handbook 2011, Hatsimla covered an area of 2.17 km^{2}. It had 3 km roads. Amongst the medical facilities, the nearest nursing home was 3 km away and the nearest veterinary hospital was 13 km away. There were 2 medicine shops. Amongst the educational facilities it had was 1 primary school. The nearest secondary school was at Jaluidanga 4 km away. The nearest higher secondary school was at Paruldanga 2 km away.

== Transport ==
Hatsimla is on State Highway 6. Samudragarh railway station is located nearby.

== Education ==
Hatsimla has one primary school.
