= Palitpur =

- Village
- Location in West Bengal, India Palitpur (India)
- Coordinates: 23.15°N 87.50°E
- Country: India
- State: West Bengal
- District: Purba Bardhaman

Population (2011)
  - Total: 2,089

Languages
  - Official: Bengali, English
- Time zone: UTC+5:30 (IST)
- Website: purbabardhaman.gov.in

Palitpur is a village in Burdwan I CD Block in Bardhaman Sadar North subdivision of Purba Bardhaman district in West Bengal, India. It is famous for the ashram and samādhi (tomb) of Tibbetibaba, a famous saint.

== Geography ==
Palitpur is located in Saraitikar Panchayat area of Burdwan-I Block and it falls within the jurisdiction of Burdwan Sadar (North) Sub-Division of Bardhaman district.

It is a small village located near the northern part of Burdwan town. On the eastern part of the village is the narrow gauge railway track between Katwa and Burdwan. There is also an unstaffed level crossing at Palitpur in Burdwan.

== Demographics ==
As per the 2011 Census of India, Palitpur had a total population of 2,089 of which 1,042 (50%) were males and 1,047 (50%) were females. Population below 6 years was 259. The total number of literates in Palitpur was 1,295 (70.77% of the population over 6 years).

As of 2001 India census, Palitpur had a population of 1,747. The male population was 880 and female population was 867. The Scheduled Caste population was 560 and Scheduled Tribe population was 301.

== History ==
=== Tibbetibaba ===
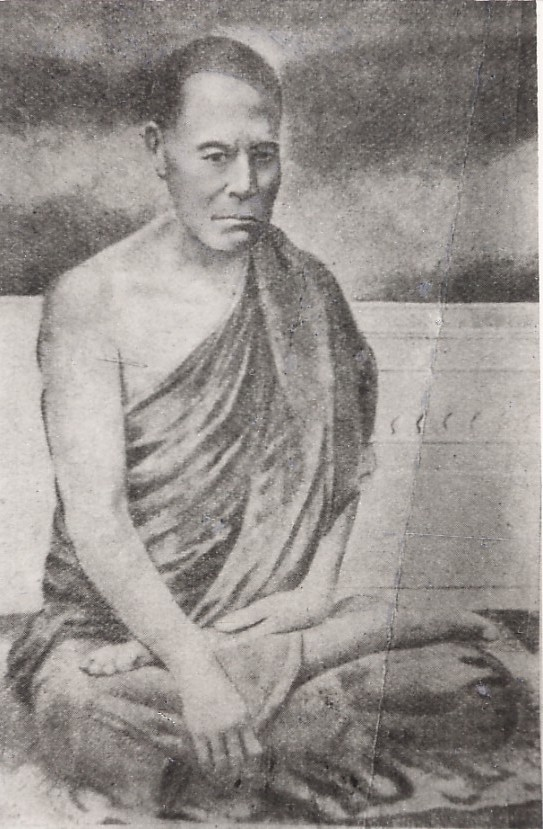
Tibbetibaba in yogic posture

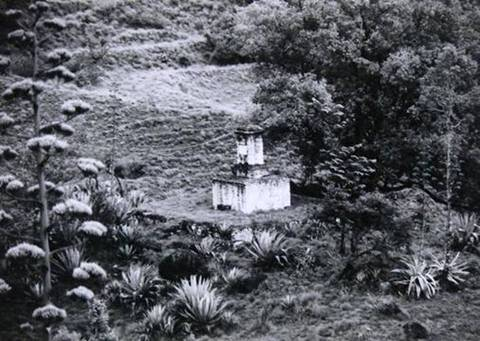
The photograph shows samadhi(tomb)of Soham Swami.

In early part of the first quarter of the Twentieth century, Bhootnath Ta, the erstwhile Zamindar of Palitpur had donated a piece of land in Palitpur for the construction of Ashram by Tibbetibaba, a great saint of India. Bhootnath Ta was an eminent disciple of Tibbetibaba. Dharmadas Mondal, another notable disciple of Tibbetibaba, was also a resident of this village.

The Ashram consists of a one-storied building, a pond, a Samādhi (tomb) of Tibbetibaba, Soham Swami and some other disciples
