= Amgoria =

- village
- Location in West Bengal, India Amgoria (India)
- Coordinates: 26.41155°N 89.07715°E
- Country: India
- State: West Bengal
- District: Purba Bardhaman

Area
  - Total: 7 km^{2} (2.7 sq mi)

Population
  - Total: 8,000
  - Density: 1,100/km^{2} (3,000/sq mi)

Languages
  - Official: Bengali, English
- Time zone: UTC+5:30 (IST)
- ISO 3166 code: IN-WB
- Vehicle registration: WB
- Climate: moderate (Köppen)
- Precipitation: 1,500–2,000 millimetres (59–79 in)
- Avg. summer temperature: 37 °C (99 °F)
- Avg. winter temperature: 8 °C (46 °F)
- Website: wb.gov.in

Amgoria, previously known as Amgadda, is a large village Burdwan division of the West Bengal state in India. Situated in the pocket of Burdwan, Birbhum, Murshidabad and Nadia District. 29 km by road from Katwa, 32 km from Shantiniketan. The village was formerly under the Birbhum District; in 1946–47, it was incorporated in Burdwan District. Amgoria is connected to the rest of India through Metal Road Net.
