= Dhandadihi =

- village
- Location in West Bengal, India Dhandadihi (India)
- Coordinates: 23.627541°N 87.150311°E
- Country: India
- State: West Bengal
- District: Paschim Bardhaman

Population (2011)
  - Total: 3,843

Languages
  - Official: Bengali, English
- Time zone: UTC+5:30 (IST)
- Vehicle registration: WB
- Lok Sabha constituency: Asansol
- Vidhan Sabha constituency: Raniganj
- Website: bardhaman.gov.in

Dhandadihi is a village in Andal (community development block) of Durgapur subdivision in Paschim Bardhaman district in the state of West Bengal, India.

== Geography ==
Dhandadihi is located at 23°37′39″N 87°09′01″E.

== Demographics ==
As of 2001 India census, Dhandadihi had a population of 3,843. The gender distribution is 55% male and 45% female. Dhandadihi has an average literacy rate of 64%, higher than the national average of 59.5%: male literacy is 70% and female literacy is 56%. Ten percent of the population are under 6 years of age.

== Education ==
Dhandadihi has one primary school.
