= Putsuri =

- Village
- Location in West Bengal, India Putsuri (India)
- Coordinates: 23.443691°N 88.166828°E
- Country: India
- State: West Bengal

Population (2011)
  - Total: 6,806

Languages
  - Official: Bengali, English
- Time zone: UTC+5:30 (IST)

Putsuri is a village in Manteswar CD block in Kalna subdivision of Purba Bardhaman district in West Bengal, India.

== Demographics ==
As per the 2011 Census of India Putsuri had a total population of 6,806, of which 3,448 (51%) were males and 3,358 (49%) were females. Population below 6 years was 817. The total number of literates in Putsuri was 4,120 (68.79% of the population over 6 years).

== Transport ==
Approx. 35 km from the nearest railway station at Memari on Howrah-Bardhaman main line. Mode of travel - bus or car from Memari station.

== Education ==
Putsuri Iswar Prasanna Institution, a coeducational higher secondary school, is affiliated with West Bengal Council of Higher Secondary Education for higher secondary classes. Putsuri Girls’ High School is affiliated with the West Bengal Board of Secondary Education.

== Culture ==
Putsuri is famous for its special type of sweets "Monda". Many people come from far away places to buy "Monda". . Baba Thakur's (Panchanan) mandir is one of the attraction for the tourist coming here specially Tuesday and Saturday. Maa kali and Gopinath temple are famous temple among many in the village. Agriculture and Health consciousness a fair which occur every year in the village is probably the most popular gathering in Kalna subdivision.

== Healthcare ==
There is a primary health centre at Putsuri.
