= Udaypur, Kalna =

Udaypur
- Village
- Interactive map of Udaypur
- Coordinates: 23°10′48″N 88°15′48″E
- Country: India
- State: West Bengal
- District: Purba Bardhaman

Population (2011)
  - Total: 811
- Website: https://purbabardhaman.gov.in/

Udaypur is a village in Kalna II block of Purba Bardhaman district in West Bengal state of India.

== Geography ==
Behula River flows by the village. Most of the land surrounding the village are composed of rice fields. The majority of the village's residents are farmers and businessmen.

== Demographics ==
As per the 2011 Census of India Udaypur had a total population of 811, of which 412 (51%) were males and 399 (49%) were females. Population below 6 years was 68. The total number of literates in Udaypur was 590 (79.41% of the population over 6 years).

== Education ==
Udaypur has one primary school and one secondary school.

== Culture ==
This village is home to a locally important festival called Ma Behular Jhapan.
