= Nadanghat =

- Village
- Location in West Bengal, India Nadanghat (India)
- Coordinates: 23.3764°N 88.2516°E
- Country: India
- State: West Bengal
- District: Purba Bardhaman

Government
  - Type: Panchayati raj (India)
  - Body: Gram panchayat

Population (2011)
  - Total: 3,799

Languages
  - Official: Bengali, English
- Time zone: UTC+5:30 (IST)
- PIN: 713 515
- Telephone code: 91 3454
- Vehicle registration: WB
- Lok Sabha constituency: Bardhaman Purba
- Vidhan Sabha constituency: Purbastali Dakshin
- Website: bardhaman.gov.in

Nadanghat is a village, with a police station, in the Purbasthali I CD block in Kalna subdivision of Purba Bardhaman district in West Bengal, India.

== History ==
The Syeds were famed zemindars of the area during Muslim rule, and they continued during the British period. When the Muslim League was formed in Dhaka in 1906, it did not have much of an influence in Bardhaman district. Most of the Muslim leaders were with the Congress. In 1919, when Mahatma Gandhi launched the Khilafat movement and followed it up with a non-cooperation movement, Harihar Sen, played an important role in the area. In order to combat the famine of 1943, food committees were formed in Bardhaman district. The Kalna subdivisional conference was organised with great difficulty at Nadanghat. Haragobinda Rej, Talukdar Sheikh, Abodh Bihari Pandey and Abdul Hasnat played important roles in the movement. In the same year flood relief was organised by the Communist Party in a commendable manner in Nadanghat area.

== Geography ==
Cities and towns in the Kalna subdivision of Purba Bardhaman district
M: municipal city/ town, CT: census town, R: rural/ urban centre, H: Historical/ religious centre, C: craft centre.
Owing to space constraints in the small map, the actual locations in a larger map may vary slightly

=== Location ===
Nadanghat is located in the flood plains of the Khargeswari river or Khari river.

=== Police station ===
Nadanghat police station has jurisdiction over parts of Purbasthali I and Purbasthali II CD Blocks. The area covered is 60 km^{2}.

=== Urbanisation ===
87.00% of the population of Kalna subdivision live in the rural areas. Only 13.00% of the population live in the urban areas. The map alongside presents some notable locations in the subdivision. All places marked in the map are linked in the larger full screen map.

== Demographics ==
As per the 2011 Census of India, Nadanghat had a total population of 3,799 of which 1,951 (51%) were males and 1,848 (49%) were females. The population below 6 years was 396. The total number of literates in Nadanghat was 2,467 (72.49% of the population over 6 years).

== Transport ==
The State Highway 8 running from Santaldih (in Purulia district) to Majhdia (in Nadia district) passes through Nadanghat.

== Education ==
Nadanghat Rampuria High School, a coeducational institution With Science, is affiliated with West Bengal Council of Higher Secondary Education.

Nadanghat Annapurna Balika Vidyalaya is affiliated with the West Bengal Board of Secondary Education.

== Healthcare ==
There is a primary health centre at Nadanghat (with 10 beds).

== See also ==
- Nadanghat (Vidhan Sabha constituency)⁣—defunct assembly constituency
