= Kalna subdivision =

- Subdivision
- Interactive map of Kalna subdivision
- Coordinates: 23.22°N 88.17°E
- Country: India
- State: West Bengal
- District: Purba Bardhaman
- Headquarters: Kalna

Area
  - Total: 993.75 km^{2} (383.69 sq mi)

Population (2011)
  - Total: 1,097,732
  - Density: 1,104.6/km^{2} (2,861.0/sq mi)

Languages
  - Official: Bengali, English
- Time zone: UTC+5:30 (IST)
- ISO 3166 code: ISO 3166-2:IN
- Website: http://bardhaman.gov.in/

Kalna subdivision is an administrative subdivision of the Purba Bardhaman district in the state of West Bengal, India.

== Overview ==
Kalna subdivision is spread mostly across the Bhagirathi basin, with its western part intruding into the Bardhaman plain, the central plain area of the district.

== Subdivisions ==
Purba Bardhaman district is divided into the following administrative subdivisions:

Subdivision	Headquarters	Area km^{2}	Population (2011)	Rural population % (2011)	Urban population % (2011)
Bardhaman Sadar North	Bardhaman	1,958.43	1,586,623	73.58	26.42
Bardhaman Sadar South	Memari	1,410.03	1,198,155	95.54	4.46
Katwa	Katwa	1,070.48	963,022	88.44	11.56
Kalna	Kalna	993.75	1,087,732	87.00	13.00
Purba Bardhaman district	Bardhaman	5,432.69	4,835,532	84.98	15.02

== Administrative units ==
Cities and towns in the Kalna subdivision of Purba Bardhaman district
M: municipal city/ town, CT: census town, R: rural/ urban centre.
Owing to space constraints in the small map, the actual locations in a larger map may vary slightly

Kalna subdivision has 4 police stations, 5 community development blocks, 5 panchayat samitis, 47 gram panchayats, 543 mouzas, 525 inhabited villages, 1 municipality and 9 census towns. The single municipality is at Kalna. The census towns are: Srirampur, Hatsimla, Jaluidanga, Gopinathpur, Nasratpur, Dhatrigram, Piarinagar, Uttar Goara and Shashpur. The subdivision has its headquarters at Kalna.

== Demographics ==
As per the 2011 Census of India data Kalna subdivision, after bifurcation of Bardhaman district in 2017, had a total population of 1,087,732. There were 556,573 (51%) males and 531,159 (49%) females. Population below 6 years was 113,711.

As per the 2011 census data the total number of literates in Kalna subdivision, after bifurcation of Bardhaman district in 2017, was 732,111 (75.16% of the population over 6 years) out of which males numbered 402,516 (80.70% of the male population over 6 years) and females numbered 329,595 (69.35% of the female population over 6 years).

See also – List of West Bengal districts ranked by literacy rate

Religion in Kalna subdivision
Hindu	70.44%
Muslim	28.17%
Christian	0.17%
Others	1.22%

In the 2011 census Hindus numbered 766,230 and formed 70.44% of the population in Kalna subdivision. Muslims numbered 306,360 and formed 28.17% of the population. Christians numbered 1,859 and formed 0.17% of the population. Others numbered 13,283 and formed 1.22% of the population.

== Police stations ==
Police stations in Kalna subdivision have the following features and jurisdiction:

Police station	Area covered km^{2}	Municipal town	CD Block
Nadanghat	60	-	Purbasthali I (part), Purbasthali II (part)
Purbasthali	180.3		Purbasthali I (part), Purbasthali II (part)
Kalna	347.6	Kalna	Kalna I, Kalna II
Monteswar	354.04	-	Manteswar

== Blocks ==
Community development blocks in Kalna subdivision are:

CD Block	Headquarters	Area km^{2}	Population (2011)	SC %	ST %	Hindus %	Muslims %	Literacy rate %	Census Towns
Purbasthali I	Srirampur	148.44	206,977	25.46	3.68	74.70	24.95	77.59	5
Purbasthali II	Patuli	192.47	212,355	26.11	3.73	68.06	31.60	70.35	-
Kalna I	Rangapara	169.08	206,945	28.63	10.13	68.60	29.00	75.81	3
Kalna II	Singarkone	172.17	167,335	36.61	17.29	80.32	15.34	76.25	1
Manteswar	Monteswar	305.19	237,398	23.95	2.93	57.69	41.77	73.08	-

== Gram panchayats ==
The subdivision contains 47 gram panchayats under 5 community development blocks:

- Kalna I block consists of nine gram panchayats, viz. Atgharia Simlan, Dhatrigram, Krishnadevpur, Baghnapara, Hatkalna, Nandai, Begpur, Kankuria and Sultanpur.
- Kalna II block consists of eight gram panchayats, viz. Akalpaus, Badla, Baradhamas, Pindira, Anukhal, Baidyapur, Kalyanpur and Satgachhi.
- Manteswar block consists of 13 gram panchayats, viz. Baghson, Kusumgram, Monteswar, Vagra Mulgram, Bamunpara, Majhergram, Pipalan, Denur, Mamudpur–I, Putsuri, Jamna, Mamudpur–II and Shushunia.
- Purbasthali I block consists of seven gram panchayats, viz. Bogpur, Jahannagar, Nasratpur, Srirampur, Dogachhia, Nadanghat and Samudragarh.
- Purbasthali II block consists of ten gram panchayats, viz. Jhaudanga, Majdia, Nimdaha, Purbasthali, Kalekhantala–I, Mertala, Patuli, Kalekhantala–II, Muksimpara and Pilla.

== Economy ==
=== Agriculture ===
In the erstwhile Bardhaman district agriculture was the pre-dominant economic activity and the main source of livelihood for the rural people. The soil and climate favours the production of food grains. Cash crops are also grown. Irrigation facilities had contributed in a major way towards higher agricultural productivity. Amongst the districts of West Bengal, Bardhaman district had maximum irrigated land under cultivation. Given below is an overview of the agricultural production (all data in tonnes) for Bardhaman Sadar North subdivision, other subdivisions and the Purba Bardhaman district, after bifurcation of the erstwhile Bardhaman district, with data for the year 2013-14.

CD Block/ Subdivision	Rice	Wheat	Jute	Pulses	Oil seeds	Potatoes	Sugarcane
Purbasthali	51,661	669	35,103	28	2,680	1,649	-
Purbasthali II	2,715	2,774	104,835	125	2,703	2,774	-
Kalna I	57,151	-	23,084	8	4,647	23,876	-
Kalna II	49,981	3	16,005	3	275	-	-
Manteswar	95,641	15	348	-	1,120	28,709	565
Kalna subdivision	257,149	3,461	179,375	164	11,425	159,659	565
Katwa	509,610	638	65,168	217	7,432	51,928	97,483
Bardhaman Sadar North	688,626	908	-	108	3,059	105,182	1,802
Bardhaman Sadar South	441,645	1,758	33	1,375	14,619	883,457	1,192
Purba Bardhaman district	1,897,030	6,765	244,576	1,864	36,535	1,200,226	101,042

== Education ==
Given in the table below (data in numbers) is a comprehensive picture of the education scenario in Purba Bardhaman district, after bifurcation of Bardhaman district in 2017, with data for the year 2013-14:

Subdivision	Primary School		Middle School		High School		Higher Secondary School		General College, Univ		Technical / Professional Instt		Non-formal Education	
Subdivision	Institution	Student	Institution	Student	Institution	Student	Institution	Student	Institution	Student	Institution	Student	Institution	Student
Bardhaman Sadar North	947	83,083	42	3,019	122	72,981	92	94,260	8	24,612	38	7,666	2,331	81,318
Bardhaman Sadar South	787	59,920	38	3,138	103	59,680	60	62,371	5	9,521	7	2,069	2,067	64,473
Katwa	601	52,239	21	1,637	74	45,704	42	44,645	3	7,965	8	1,190	1,412	64,979
Kalna	673	54,249	26	1,984	74	55,964	51	65,334	4	9,594	7	663	1,761	67,996
Purba Bardhaman district	3,008	249,491	127	9,778	373	234,329	245	266,610	20	51,692	60	11,588	7,571	277,766

Note: Primary schools include junior basic schools; middle schools, high schools and higher secondary schools include madrasahs; technical schools include junior technical schools, junior government polytechnics, industrial technical institutes, industrial training centres, nursing training institutes etc.; technical and professional colleges include engineering colleges, medical colleges, para-medical institutes, management colleges, teachers training and nursing training colleges, law colleges, art colleges, music colleges etc. Special and non-formal education centres include sishu siksha kendras, madhyamik siksha kendras, centres of Rabindra mukta vidyalaya, recognised Sanskrit tols, institutions for the blind and other handicapped persons, Anganwadi centres, reformatory schools etc.

The following institutions are located in Kalna subdivision:

- Kalna College was established at Kalna in 1943.
- Purbasthali College was established at Parulia in 2009.
- Dr. Gourmohan Roy College was established at Monteswar in 1986.
- Badla Vivekananda B.Ed. College was established at Badla in 2015.

== Notable Persons ==
Tanay Shil is the first research scholar of Botany who joined the Botanical Survey of India. He was contributed in the wetland flora and ethnobotany.

== Healthcare ==
The table below (all data in numbers) presents an overview of the medical facilities available and patients treated in the hospitals, health centres and sub-centres in 2014 in Purba Bardhaman district, after bifurcation of the erstwhile Bardhaman district in 2017, with data for the year 2013-14.

Subdivision	Health & Family Welfare Deptt, WB				Other State Govt Deptts	Local bodies	Central Govt Deptts / PSUs	NGO / Private Nursing Homes	Total	Total Number of Beds	Total Number of Doctors	Indoor Patients	Outdoor Patients
Subdivision	Hospitals	Rural Hospitals	Block Primary Health Centres	Primary Health Centres	Other State Govt Deptts	Local bodies	Central Govt Deptts / PSUs	NGO / Private Nursing Homes	Total	Total Number of Beds	Total Number of Doctors	Indoor Patients	Outdoor Patients
Bardhaman Sadar North	1	2	5	23	2	-	1	69	103	2,915	554	156,726	2,525,789
Bardhaman Sadar South	-	1	5	21	-	-	-	12	39	374	41	209,640	1,619,459
Katwa	1	1	5	13	-	-	-	8	28	452	59	65,055	1,291,942
Kalna	1	1	4	17	-	-	-	20	43	619	45	49,640	1,186,491
Purba Bardhaman district	3	5	19	74	2	-	1	109	213	4,360	699	481,061	6,623,681

Medical facilities available in Kalna subdivision are as follows:

Hospitals: (Name, location, beds)
Kalna Subdivisional Hospital, Kalna, 200 beds
Indian Red Cross Society, Kalna, 8 beds
Rural Hospitals: (Name, CD block, location, beds)
Srirampur Rural Hospital, Purbasthali I CD block, Srirampur, PO Vidyanagar, 30 beds
Purbasthali Rural Hospital, Purbasthali II CD block, Purbasthali, 30 beds
Atgharia Rural Hospital, Kalna I CD block, Atgharia, 30 beds
Monteswar Rural Hospital, Manteswar CD block, Monteswar, 30 beds
Block Primary Health Centre: (Name, block, location, beds)
Badla BPHC, Kalna II, Badla, PO Chagram, 15 beds
Primary Health Centres: (CD block-wise)(CD block, PHC location, beds)
Kalna I: Baghnapara (10), Sahajpur (6), Sultanpur (10)
Kalna II: Akalpoush (6), Angarson, PO Pindra (2), Baidyapur (15), Tehatta (2)
Manteswar: Dhanyakherur, PO Majhergram (10), Moinampur, PO Katsihi (6), Putsuri (6)
Purbasthali I: Dogachhia, PO Rai Dogachhia (4), Nadanghat (10), Nowapara (4)
Purbasthali II: Kubajpur, PO Rai Dogachhia (4), Nimdah, PO Belerhat (6), Patuli (10), Singari, PO Laxmipur (10)

== Electoral constituencies ==
Lok Sabha (parliamentary) and Vidhan Sabha (state assembly) constituencies in Kalna subdivision were as follows:

Lok Sabha constituency	Reservation	Vidhan Sabha constituency	Reservation	CD Block and/or Gram panchayats and/or municipal areas
Bardhaman Purba	Reserved for SC	Kalna	Reserved for SC	Kalna municipality, Kalna II CD Block and Bagnapara, Hatkalna and Krishnadevpur gram panchayats of Kalna I CD Block
		Purbasthali Dakshin	None	Nandai, Kankuria, Begpur, Atghoria Simlan, Dhatrigram and Sultanpur gram panchayats of Kalna I CD Block and Nasratpur, Samudragarh, Bagpur, Sreerampur and Nadanghat gram panchayats of Purbasthali I CD Block
		Purbasthali Uttar	None	Purbasthali II CD Block, Jahannagar and Dogachia gram panchayats of Purbasthali I CD Block, and Bamunpara, Mamudpur II and Putsuri gram panchayats of Manteswar CD Block
		All other Vidhan Sabha segments outside Kalna subdivision		
Bardhaman-Durgapur	None	Manteswar	None	Baghsan, Vagra Mulgram, Denur, Jamna, Kusumgram, Majhergram, Mamudpur I, Manteswar, Pipalan and Shushunia gram panchayats of Manteswar CD Block and Barapalason I, Barapalason II, Bohar I, Bohar II, Bijur I, Bijur II and Satgachhia I gram panchayats of Memari II CD Block
		All other Vidhan Sabha segments outside Kalna subdivision		
