= Bardhaman Purba Lok Sabha constituency =

Lok Sabha constituency in West Bengal

Coordinates: 23.2°N 87.9°E

Bardhaman Purba WB-38
- Lok Sabha constituency
- Interactive Map Outlining Bardhaman Purba Lok Sabha Constituency

Constituency details
- Country: India
- Region: East India
- State: West Bengal
- Assembly constituencies: Raina; Jamalpur; Kalna; Memari; Purbasthali Dakshin; Purbasthali Uttar; Katwa
- Established: 2009
- Total electors: 18,01,333 (2024)
- Reservation: SC

Member of Parliament
- 18th Lok Sabha
- Incumbent Sharmila Sarkar
- Party: NCPI
- Alliance: NDA
- Elected year: 2024

Bardhaman Purba Lok Sabha constituency is one of the 543 parliamentary Lok Sabha Constituencies in West Bengal in India.

== Assembly Segments ==
Parliamentary constituencies in West Bengal - 1. Cooch Behar, 2. Alipurduars, 3. Jalpaiguri, 4. Darjeeling, 5. Raiganj, 6. Balurghat, 7. Maldaha Uttar, 8. Maldaha Dakshin, 9. Jangipur, 10. Baharampur, 11. Murshidabad, 12. Krishnanagar, 13. Ranaghat, 14. Bangaon, 15. Barrackpore, 16. Dum Dum, 17. Barasat, 18. Basirhat, 19. Jaynagar, 20. Mathurapur, 21. Diamond Harbour, 22. Jadavpur, 23. Kolkata Dakshin, 24. Kolkata Uttar, 25. Howrah, 26. Uluberia, 27. Serampore, 28. Hooghly, 29. Arambagh, 30. Tamluk, 31, Kanthi, 32. Ghatal, 33. Jhargram, 34. Medinipur, 35. Purulia, 36. Bankura, 37. Bishnupur, 38. Bardhaman Purba, 39. Bardhaman Durgapur, 40. Asansol, 41. Bolpur, 42. Birbhum

Bardhaman Purba Lok Sabha constituency (parliamentary constituency no. 38) is composed of the following assembly segments:

#	Name	District	Member	Party	2024 Lead
261	Raina (SC)	Purba Bardhaman	Subhash Patra	BJP	AITC
262	Jamalpur (SC)	Purba Bardhaman	Arun Halder	BJP	AITC
264	Kalna (SC)	Purba Bardhaman	Siddhartha Majumdar	BJP	AITC
265	Memari	Purba Bardhaman	Manab Guha	BJP	AITC
268	Purbasthali Dakshin	Purba Bardhaman	Prankrishna Tapadar	BJP	AITC
269	Purbasthali Uttar	Purba Bardhaman	Gopal Chattopadhyay	BJP	AITC
270	Katwa	Purba Bardhaman	Krishna Ghosh	BJP	AITC

== Members of Parliament ==
Year	Member	Party
Till 2009 : Constituency did not exist
2009	Anup Kumar Saha	Communist Party of India (Marxist)
2014	Sunil Kumar Mondal	Trinamool Congress
2019	Sunil Kumar Mondal	Trinamool Congress
2024	Sharmila Sarkar	Trinamool Congress
2026 (Note: Switched to NCPI as part of AITC Rebels in Lok Sabha.)	Sharmila Sarkar	Nationalist Citizens Party of India

For Members of Parliament from this area in previous years see Burdwan Lok Sabha constituency and Katwa Lok Sabha constituency

== Election results ==
=== 2024 ===
2024 Indian general elections: Bardhaman Purba
Party	Candidate	Votes	%	±%
AITC	Sharmila Sarkar	720,302	48.11	▲3.59
BJP	Ashim Kumar Sarkar	559,730	37.38	▼0.94
CPI(M)	Nirab Khan	176,899	11.81	▼0.41
NOTA	None of the above	12,697	0.85	▲0.10
Majority		160,572	24.09	▲15.43
Turnout		14,97,310	83.12	▼1.66
AITC hold		Swing		

=== 2019 ===
2019 Indian general elections: Bardhaman Purba
Party	Candidate	Votes	%	±%
AITC	Sunil Kumar Mondal	640,834	44.52	+1.02
BJP	Paresh Chandra Das	551,523	38.32	+25.39
CPI(M)	Ishwar Chandra Das	175,920	12.22	−22.61
INC	Siddharth Majumdar	38,472	2.67	−3.54
NOTA	None of the above	10,747	0.75	N/A
Majority		89,311	8.66	+3.38
Turnout		14,39,603	84.78	
AITC hold		Swing		

=== General election 2014 ===
2014 Indian general elections: Bardhaman Purba
Party	Candidate	Votes	%	±%
AITC	Sunil Kumar Mandal	5,74,660	43.50	+1.48
CPI(M)	Ishwar Chandra Das	4,60,181	34.83	−12.48
BJP	Santosh Roy	1,70,828	12.93	+6.56
INC	Chandana Manjhi	68,884	5.21	N/A
JMM	Swapan Malik	9,666	0.73	N/A
SUCI(C)	Kalicharan Sardar	7,981	0.60	N/A
CPI(ML)L	Pijush Kumar Sahana	5,919	0.44	−0.30
BSP	Mukul Biswas	5,442	0.41	−0.39
JDP	Prosanta Bag	3,410	0.25	
Majority		1,14,479	8.66	+3.38
Turnout		13,20,922	86.21	−1.00
AITC gain from CPI(M)		Swing	-4.76	

=== General election 2009 ===
2009 Indian general elections: Bardhaman Purba
Party	Candidate	Votes	%	±%
CPI(M)	Dr Anup Kumar Saha	5,39,987	47.31	
AITC	Ashok Biswas	4,72,568	42.02	
BJP	Shankar Haldar	71,632	6.37	
AUDF	Rabindranath Bag	17,716	1.57	
JDP	Raju Malik	12,982	1.15	
BSP	Mukul Biswas	9,069	0.80	
CPI(ML)L	Pijush Kumar Sahana	8,419	0.74	
Majority		67,419	5.28	
Turnout		11,24,373	87.21	
CPI(M) win (new seat)				

== See also ==
- List of constituencies of the Lok Sabha
