= Ukhrid =

Ukhrid Ukharid
- Village
- Location in West Bengal, India Ukhrid (India)
- Coordinates: 23.170667°N 87.721742°E
- Country: India
- State: West Bengal
- District: Purba Bardhaman
- Elevation: 49 m (161 ft)

Population (2011)
  - Total: 6,896

Languages
  - Official: Bengali, English
- Time zone: UTC+5:30 (IST)
- PIN: 713142 (Ukhrid)
- Telephone/STD code: 03451
- Lok Sabha constituency: Bishnupur
- Vidhan Sabha constituency: Khandaghosh
- Website: purbabardhaman.gov.in

Ukhrid, an alternative named Ukharid, is a village and a gram panchayat, located in Khandaghosh CD block in Bardhaman Sadar South subdivision of Purba Bardhaman district in the state of West Bengal, India.

== Geography ==
Cities and towns in the Bardhaman Sadar South subdivision of Purba Bardhaman district
M: municipal city/ town, CT: census town, R: rural/ urban centre, H: historical/ religious centre.
Owing to space constraints in the small map, the actual locations in a larger map may vary slightly

=== Urbanisation ===
95.54% of the population of Bardhaman Sadar South subdivision live in the rural areas. Only 4.46% of the population live in the urban areas, and that is the lowest proportion of urban population amongst the four subdivisions in Purba Bardhaman district. The map alongside presents some of the notable locations in the subdivision. All places marked in the map are linked in the larger full screen map.

=== Location ===
Ukhrid is located at 23°10′10″N 87°43′20″E.

Ukhrid village is connected to other parts of the area through both railways and roadways. The nearest railway station is the Bowaichandi railway station, 3 km (1.9 mi) from the village and the nearest roadway is the Khandaghosh-Badulia Road, which is well connected to the State Highway 7 (West Bengal).

=== Gram panchayat ===
Ukhrid Gram Panchayat is bounded by Lodna and Berugram on the west, Kaiyar on the south, Sagrai and Sankari on the east and Shashanga on the north-east, in the district of Purba Bardhaman. The villages under Ukhrid gram panchayat are Ukhrid, Kule, Mahavpur, Gayeshpur, Chagram, Enayetnagar, Krishnapur Kukuria, Saranga, Angram, Tarul, Nowhat and Khantikar. It is now under 259, Khandaghosh Vidhansabha constituency and in 37, Bishnupur (Lok Sabha constituency) Lok Sabha constituency. The pincode no of Ukhrid is 713142 and Telephone/STD code is (+91) 03451.

Ukhrid is about 94 km (58 mi) from Kolkata, the state capital and is about 21.5 km (13.4 mi) from Bardhaman, the district headquarters and is about 7.5 km (4.7 mi) from Khandaghosh.

=== Administration and Banking ===
The panchayat office is located in the central area of the Ukhrid GP and a Land Reforms office is located in front of Panchayat office.

Ukhrid GP had offices of two commercial banks and a gramin bank.

== Demographics ==
As per the 2011 Census of India Ukhrid had a total population of 6,896 of which 3,517 (51%) were males and 3,379 (49%) were females. Population below 6 years was 861. The total number of literates in Ukhrid was 4,099 (79% of the population over 6 years).

== Festivals ==
According to the Islamic tradition, there are two festivals celebrated by Muslims every year - Eid-ul-Fitr just after Ramzan and Eid-ul-Zuha in the month of Haj. Although the traditionally famous festival, Jashne Eid Miladun Nabi juloos prayer celebrated by Muslims every year in this area. As well as, there are the widely popular festivals celebrated by Hindus every year - Kali Puja generally on the new moon day of the month of Kartika and Vishwakarma Jayanti or Vishwakarma Puja generally celebrated every year on 17 or 18 September.

== Economics ==
Main occupation is Agriculture. Approximately 65% people living in this village directly and indirectly depend on Agriculture. About 16% people are in multiple services and about 19% people are involved in small, medium and large-sized shopkeeper businesses. This is a rice and potato agricultural area with several rice mills and cold storage.

== Transport ==
Ukhrid is on the Khandaghosh - Badulia Road (also known as Kabi Ghanaram Chakrabarty Sarani in the area). Khandaghosh is on State Highway 8 (West Bengal) and Badulia is on State Highway 7 (West Bengal). As well as, the Bowaichandi - Oari Road via Ukhrid, is connected with the State Highway 8 (West Bengal) and perpendicular to Khandaghosh-Badulia Road on the north (Bowaichandi-Oari Road is also known as Biplabi Batukeshwar Dutt Sarani in the area).

Bowaichandi, 3 km (1.9 mi) from Ukhrid, has a rail station (named Bowaichandi railway station) on the Bankura-Masagram line (formerly Bankura Damodar Railway) of South Eastern Railway. As of April 2017, DEMU services were available between Bankura and Mathnasipur.

== Education ==
Ukhrid Gram Panchayat had one general college with 1,123 students and The college, known as Sir Rashbehari Ghosh Mahavidyalaya was established at Ukhrid Bazaar in Khandaghosh CD Block in 2010. The college is named after Sir Rashbehari Ghosh, lawyer, politician and social worker, who was born in Torkona village in Khandaghosh CD Block. It offers honours courses in Bengali, Sanskrit, English, history, philosophy and political science. It is affiliated with the University of Burdwan.

Ukhrid High School was established in 1925. It has about 1050 students. Gayeshpur Girls High School (Madrasah) was established in 1978. It has about 350 students and it is situated half kilometer away from the nearest College - (Sir Rashbehari Ghosh Mahavidyalaya).

== Healthcare ==
There is a primary health care centre at Ukhrid. There is a small number of private pharmacy and elementary practitioners who serve in minor cases.
