= Jamalpur (community development block) =

- Community development block
- Location in West Bengal
- Coordinates: 23°04′00″N 87°59′00″E
- State: West Bengal
- District: Purba Bardhaman
- Parliamentary constituency: Bardhaman Purba
- Assembly constituency: Jamalpur

Area
  - Total: 101.55 sq mi (263.02 km^{2})
- Elevation: 69 ft (21 m)

Population (2011)
  - Total: 266,338
  - Density: 2,622.7/sq mi (1,012.6/km^{2})
- Time zone: UTC+5.30 (IST)
- PIN: 713408 (Jamalpur); 713166 (Jaugram); 713404 (Chakdighi); 713401 (Ajhapur)
- Telephone/STD code: 03213
- Vehicle registration: WB-37, WB-38, WB-41, WB-42, WB-44
- Literacy Rate: 74.08 per cent
- Website: http://purbabardhaman.gov.in/

Jamalpur is a community development block that forms an administrative division in Bardhaman Sadar South subdivision of Purba Bardhaman district in the Indian state of West Bengal.

== History ==
=== Administrative set up ===
At some point of time the town was known as Salimabad. In Peterson's District Gazetteer of 1910 there is mention of Jamalpur and other police stations in Bardhaman subdivision.

== Geography ==
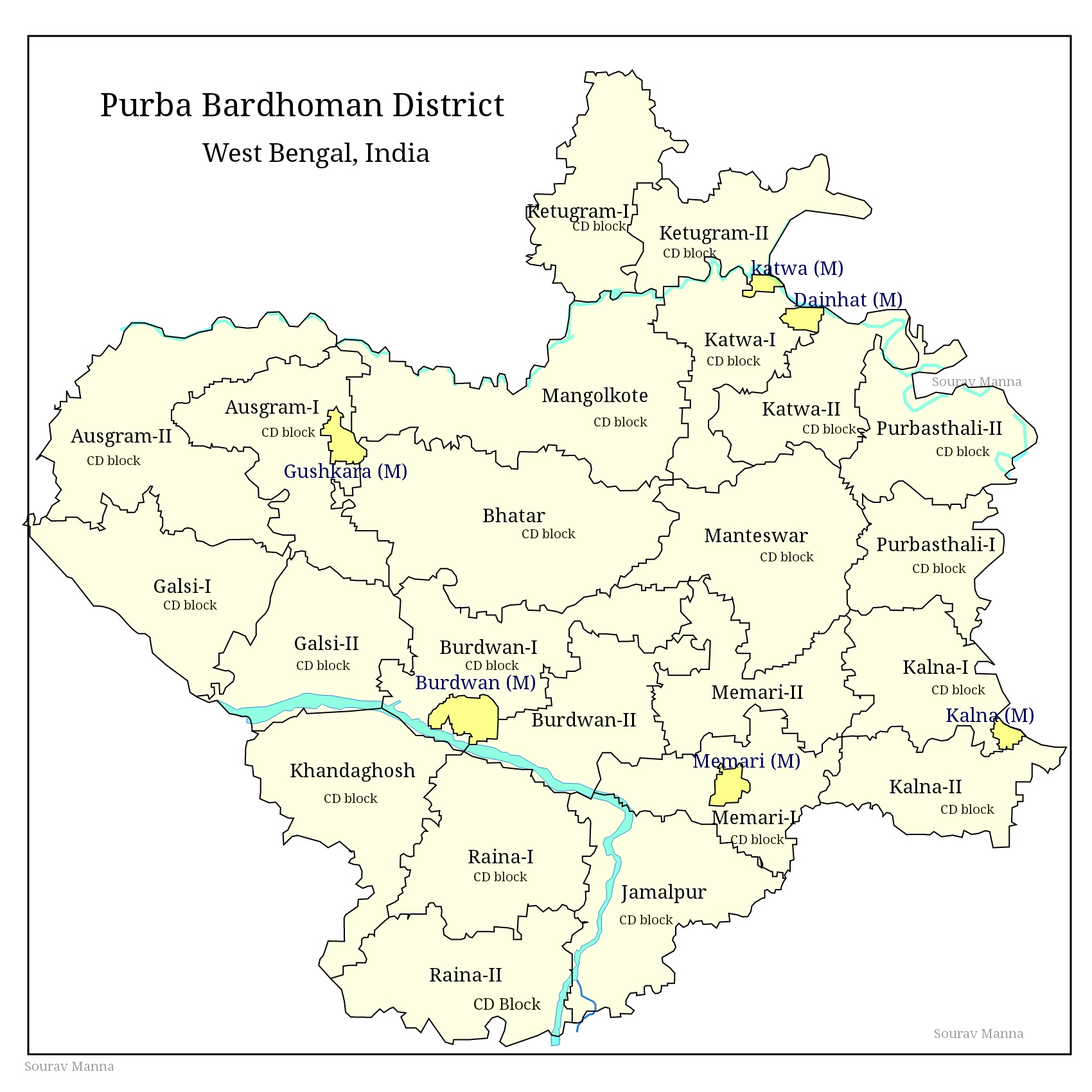
CD blocks of Purba Bardhaman district

=== Location ===
Jamalpur is located at 23°04′00″N 87°59′00″E.

Jamalpur CD Block is part of the Khandaghosh Plain, which lies in the south-western part of the district, The Damodar flows through the area. The bed of the Damodar is higher than the surrounding areas and the right bank is protected against floods with embankments in portions of the south of the Damodar River. The region has alluvial soil of recent origin. Unlike the rest of Bardhaman district, which lies to the north of the Damodar River, the Khandaghosh-Jamalpur-Raina area lies on the alluvial plains between the Damodar on its southern/ eastern side and the Dwarakeswar River. As a result, it has been a flood prone area.

Jamalpur CD Block is bounded by Memari I CD Block on the north, Dhaniakhali CD Block, in Hooghly district, on the east and south, and Raina I and Raina II CD Blocks on the west.

Jamalpur CD Block has an area of 263.02 km^{2}. It has 1 panchayat samity, 13 gram panchayats, 205 gram sansads (village councils), 123 mouzas and 121 inhabited villages. Jamalpur police station serves this block. Headquarters of this CD Block is at Jamalpur.

Gram panchayats of Jamalpur block/panchayat samiti are: Abhjhati I, Abujhati II, Ajhapur, Berugram, Chakdighi, Jamalpur I, Jamalpur II, Jarogram, Jaugram, Jotsriram, Panchra, Paratal I and Paratal II.

== Demographics ==
=== Population ===
As per the 2011 Census of India Jamalpur CD Block had a total population of 266,338, all of which were rural. There were 134,429 (51%) males and 131,809 (49%) females. Population below 6 years was 27,737. Scheduled Castes numbered 96,097 (36.08%) and Scheduled Tribes numbered 40,432 (15.18%).

As per the 2001 census, Jamalpur block had a total population of 243,474, out of which 123,728 were males and 119,746 were females. Jamalpur block registered a population growth of 14.87 per cent during the 1991–2001 decade. Decadal growth for Bardhaman district was 14.36 per cent. Decadal growth in West Bengal was 17.84 per cent. Scheduled castes at 87,575 formed around one-third the population. Scheduled tribes numbered 37,043.

Large villages (with 4,000+ population) in Jamalpur CD Block are (2011 census figures in brackets): Masagram (4,310), Ruppur (6,866), Nabagram (6,298), Ajhapur (8,502), Selimabad (5,491), Balarampur (5,490), Kalera (6,236), Sahhosenpur (4,209), Shura (6,384), Pranballabhpur (4,270), Abujhati (4,611), Amra (6,038), Jaugram (11,421) and Kulingram (7,730).

Other villages in Jamalpur CD Block include (2011census figures in brackets): Berugram (2,520), Jotshriram (1,780), Paratal (2,189), Chak Dighi (1,833), Gopikantapur(2,381)

=== Literacy ===
As per the 2011 census the total number of literates in Jamalpur CD Block was 176,756 (74.08% of the population over 6 years) out of which males numbered 97,172 (80.62% of the male population over 6 years) and females numbered 79,584 (67.41% of the female population over 6 years). The gender disparity (the difference between female and male literacy rates) was 13.21%.

As per 2001 census, Jamalpur block had a total literacy of 65.54 per cent for the 6+ age group. While male literacy was 74.49 per cent female literacy was 56.35 per cent. Bardhaman district had a total literacy of 70.18 per cent, male literacy being 78.63 per cent and female literacy being 60.95 per cent.

See also – List of West Bengal districts ranked by literacy rate

Literacy in CD blocks of
Bardhaman district
Bardhaman Sadar North subdivision
Ausgram I – 69.39%
Ausgram II – 68.00%
Bhatar – 71.56%
Burdwan I – 76.07%
Burdwan II – 74.12%
Galsi II – 70.05%
Bardhaman Sadar South subdivision
Khandaghosh – 77.28%
Raina I – 80.20%
Raina II – 81.48%
Jamalpur – 74.08%
Memari I – 74.10%
Memari II – 74.59%
Kalna subdivision
Kalna I – 75.81%
Kalna II – 76.25%
Manteswar – 73.08%
Purbasthali I – 77.59%
Purbasthali II – 70.35%
Katwa subdivision
Katwa I – 70.36%
Katwa II – 69.16%
Ketugram I – 68.00%
Ketugram II – 65.96%
Mongalkote – 67.97%
Durgapur subdivision
Andal – 77.25%
Faridpur Durgapur – 74.14%
Galsi I – 72.81%
Kanksa – 76.34%
Pandabeswar – 73.01%
Asansol subdivision
Barabani – 69.58%
Jamuria – 69.42%
Raniganj – 73.86%
Salanpur – 78.76%
2011 Census: CD Block Wise

Primary Census Abstract Data

=== Languages and religion ===
Religion in Jamalpur CD block (2011)
Hinduism	80.88%
Islam	16.85%
Sarna	1.97%
Other or not stated	0.30%

In the 2011 census Hindus numbered 215,401 and formed 80.88% of the population in Jamalpur CD Block. Muslims numbered 44,866 and formed 16.85% of the population. Christians numbered 321 and formed 0.12% of the population. Others numbered 5,750 and formed 2.16% of the population.

In Bardhaman district the percentage of Hindu population has been declining from 84.3% in 1961 to 77.9% in 2011 and the percentage of Muslim population has increased from 15.2% in 1961 to 20.7% in 2011.

Languages of Jamalpur CD block (2011)
1. Bengali (89.7%)
2. Santali (9.24%)
3. Others (1.10%)

At the time of the 2011 census, 89.66% of the population spoke Bengali and 9.24% Santali as their first language.

== Rural poverty ==
As per poverty estimates obtained from household survey for families living below poverty line in 2005, rural poverty in Jamalpur CD Block was 28.18%.

== Economy ==
=== Livelihood ===
In Jamalpur CD Block in 2011, amongst the class of total workers, cultivators formed 17.70%, agricultural labourers 58.38%, household industry workers 3.56% and other workers 20.37%.

Jamalpur CD Block is part of the area where agriculture dominates the scenario but the secondary and tertiary sectors have shown an increasing trend.

Weaving and oil milling had been major occupations in the area.

=== Infrastructure ===
There are 121 inhabited villages in Jamalpur CD block. All 121 villages (100%) have power supply. All 121 villages (100%) have drinking water supply. 31 villages (25.62%) have post offices. All 121 villages (100%) have telephones (including landlines, public call offices and mobile phones). 59 villages (48.76%) have a pucca (paved) approach road and 68 villages (56.20%) have transport communication (includes bus service, rail facility and navigable waterways). 20 villages (16.53%) have agricultural credit societies. 13 villages (10.74%) have banks.

In 2013–14, there were 165 fertiliser depots, 30 seed stores and 66 fair price shops in the CD Block.

=== Agriculture ===
Persons engaged in agriculture
in Jamalpur CD Block
1. Bargadars (7.85%)
2. Patta holders (6.11%)
3. Small farmers (5.57%)
4. Marginal farmers (21.7%)
5. Agricultural labourers (58.8%)

Although the Bargadari Act of 1950 recognised the rights of bargadars to a higher share of crops from the land that they tilled, it was not implemented fully. Large tracts, beyond the prescribed limit of land ceiling, remained with the rich landlords. From 1977 onwards major land reforms took place in West Bengal. Land in excess of land ceiling was acquired and distributed amongst the peasants. Following land reforms land ownership pattern has undergone transformation. In 2013–14, persons engaged in agriculture Jamalpur could be classified as follows: bargadars 7.85%, patta (document) holders 6.11%, small farmers (possessing land between 1 and 2 hectares) 5.57%, marginal farmers (possessing land up to 1 hectare) 21.68% and agricultural labourers 58.80%.

In 2003–04 net cropped area in Jamalpur Block was 19,062 hectares and the area in which more than one crop was grown was 19,408 hectares.

In 2013–14, Jamalpur CD Block produced 3,629 tonnes of Aman paddy, the main winter crop, from 1,280 hectares, 4,015 tonnes of Aus paddy (summer crop) from 1,517 hectares, 9,492 tonnes of Boro paddy (spring crop) from 2,796 hectares, 33 tonnes of jute from 2 hectares and 317,928 tonnes of potatoes from 14,672 hectares. It also produced oilseeds.

In Bardhaman district as a whole Aman paddy constituted 64.32% of the total area under paddy cultivation, while the area under Boro and Aus paddy constituted 32.87% and 2.81% respectively. The expansion of Boro paddy cultivation, with higher yield rates, was the result of expansion of irrigation system and intensive cropping. In 2013–14, the total area irrigated in Jamalpur CD Block was 16,278.48 hectares, out of which 14,340.40 hectares were irrigated by canal water, 781.56 hectares by river lift irrigation and 1,156.52 hectares by deep tube wells.

The Eden Canal from Kanchannagar to Jamalpur was the first irrigation canal in the district. In the collectorate reports of 1904, it is recorded that the canal used to irrigate 20,000 acres of land.

=== Banking ===
In 2013–14, Jamalpur CD Block had offices of 7 commercial banks and 5 gramin banks.

== Transport ==
Jamalpur CD Block has 10 ferry services and 11 originating/ terminating bus routes.

Howrah-Bardhaman chord passes through the CD Block and there are stations at Masagram and Nabagram.

DEMU services are available between Bankura and Masagram on the Bankura-Masagram line. Grammasagram, Habaspur and Gramdadpur are stations on this line, before it crosses the Damodar River.

Kolkata-Delhi NH 19 (old numbering NH 2) passes through this CD Block.

The Memari-Tarakeswar sector of SH 15 running from Dainhat (in Bardhaman district) to Gadiara (in Howrah district) passes through this CD Block and crosses NH 19 at Masagram.

== Education ==
In 2013–14, Jamalpur CD Block had 167 primary schools with 13,172 students, 7 middle schools with 677 students, 12 high schools with 7,406 students and 11 higher secondary schools with 10,619 students. Jamalpur CD Block had 1 general college with 1,234 students, 1 technical/ professional institute with 100 students, 548 institutions for special and non-formal education with 14,924 students.

As per the 2011 census, in Jamalpur CD block, amongst the 121 inhabited villages, 3 villages did not have schools, 56 villages had two or more primary schools, 47 villages had at least 1 primary and 1 middle school and 33 villages had at least 1 middle and 1 secondary school.

More than 6,000 schools (in erstwhile Bardhaman district) serve cooked midday meal to more than 900,000 students.

Jamalpur Mahavidyalaya was established at Jamalpur in 2010.

Radha Gobinda B Ed Teacher Training College was established at Jhapandanga, PO Keotara.

== Healthcare ==
In 2014, Jamalpur CD Block had 1 block primary health centre, 4 primary health centres and 3 private nursing homes with total 98 beds and 8 doctors (excluding private bodies). It had 38 family welfare subcentres. 192,359 patients were treated indoor and 429,840 patients were treated outdoor in the hospitals, health centres and subcentres of the CD Block.

Jamalpur Rural Hospital at Jamalpur (with 30 beds) is the main medical facility in Jamalpur CD block. There are primary health centres at Chakdighi (with 10 beds), Chaksmanjari (with 10 beds), Illasora (with 4 beds) and Nabagram (with 4 beds).

Jamalpur CD Block is one of the areas of Bardhaman district which is affected by a low level of arsenic contamination of ground water.
