= Maheshbati =

- Village
- Location in West Bengal, India Maheshbati (India)
- Coordinates: 23.0761°N 87.9061°E
- Country: India
- State: West Bengal
- District: Purba Bardhaman

Population (2011)
  - Total: 1,028

Languages
  - Official: Bengali, English
- Time zone: UTC+5:30 (IST)
- Lok Sabha constituency: Bardhaman Purba
- Vidhan Sabha constituency: Raina
- Website: purbabardhaman.gov.in

Maheshbati is a village in Raina I CD block in Bardhaman Sadar South subdivision of Purba Bardhaman district in the Indian state of West Bengal.

== Geography ==
Cities and towns in the Bardhaman Sadar South subdivision of Purba Bardhaman district
M: municipal city/ town, CT: census town, R: rural/ urban centre, H: historical/ religious centre.
Owing to space constraints in the small map, the actual locations in a larger map may vary slightly

=== Urbanisation ===
95.54% of the population of Bardhaman Sadar South subdivision live in the rural areas. Only 4.46% of the population live in the urban areas, and that is the lowest proportion of urban population amongst the four subdivisions in Purba Bardhaman district. The map alongside presents some of the notable locations in the subdivision. All places marked in the map are linked in the larger full screen map.

=== Location ===
Maheshbati is located at 23.0761°N 87.9061°E.

== Demographics ==
As per the 2011 Census of India, Maheshbati had a total population of 1,028 of which 533 (52%) were males and 495 (48%) were females. Population below 6 years was 116. The total number of literates in Maheshbati was 644 (70.61% of the population over 6 years).

== Transport ==
Maheshbati is on Raina-Karalaghat Road, adjacent to Raina.

== Healthcare ==
Maheshbati Rural Hospital at Maheshbati (with 30 beds) is the main medical facility in Raina I CD block. There are primary health centres at Meral (with 4 beds), Narugram (with 6 beds) and Shyamsundar (with 10 beds).

See also - Healthcare in West Bengal
