= Kumirkola =

- Village
- Location in West Bengal, India Kumirkola (India)
- Coordinates: 23.2446°N 87.7047°E
- Country: India subdivision_type1 = State
- District: Purba Bardhaman

Population (2011)
  - Total: 1,731

Languages
  - Official: Bengali, English
- Time zone: UTC+5:30 (IST)
- Telephone/STD code: 03451
- Lok Sabha constituency: Bishnupur
- Vidhan Sabha constituency: Khandaghosh
- Website: purbabardhaman.gov.in

Kumirkola is a village in Khandaghosh CD Block in Bardhaman Sadar South subdivision of Purba Bardhaman district in West Bengal, India.

== Geography ==
It is a small village residing on the banks of the Damodar river, which flows through the heart of Burdwan district of West Bengal in India.

== Etymology ==
The name Kumirkola is probably derived from two Bengali words "Kumir" and "khola", indicating a crocodile and a rough surface. It is possible that the name could be derived from the dry lands of the village, alleged metaphorically to the rough textured skin of a crocodile.

== Demographics ==
As per the 2011 Census of India Kumirkola had a total population of 1,731 of which 900 (52%) were males and 831 (48%) were females. Population below 6 years was 200. The total number of literates in Kumirkola was 1,147 (74.92% of the population over 6 years).

== Culture ==
The Durga puja (worship of Goddess Durga) during the month of September–October is done by the Banerjee family of Kumirkola. The family stems from the charismatic figure of District Magistrate Pyarimohan Banerjee, who started the Durga puja in n1830.
