= Sankari, West Bengal =

Sankari Basudebpur
- Village
- Location in West Bengal, India Sankari (India)
- Coordinates: 23.19116°N 87.78196°E
- State: West Bengal

Government
  - Type: West Bengal gov.

Population (2011)
  - Total: 4,776
- Time zone: UTC+5:30 (IST)
- PIN: 713424
- ISO 3166 code: IN-WB
- Website: purbabardhaman.gov.in

Sankari is a village in Khandaghosh CD block in Bardhaman Sadar South subdivision of the Purba Bardhaman district in West Bengal, India.

== Geography ==
There are four paras (neighbourhoods) in the village. There are five big and some small ponds. Sankari used to be called Basudebpur; its current name reflects the village's temple of Sankari goddess. Khudkuri is a neighbouring village. It is 15 km away from Burdwan.

== Demographics ==
As per the 2011 Census of India Shankrai had a total population of 4,776 of which 2,436 (51%) were males and 2,340 (49%) were females. Population below 6 years was 500. The total number of literates in Shankrai was 3,228 (75.49% of the population over 6 years).

== Education ==
Sankrai Primary School, a coeducational institution, is affiliated with the West Bengal Board of Secondary Education. It is also affiliated with West Bengal Council of Higher Secondary Education.

== Healthcare ==
There is a primary health centre at Khudkuri, PO Sankrai (with 4 beds), located nearby.
