= Raina I =

- Community development block
- Location in West Bengal
- Coordinates: 23°04′07″N 87°54′22″E
- Country: India
- State: West Bengal
- District: Purba Bardhaman
- Parliamentary constituency: Bardhaman Purba
- Assembly constituency: Raina, Jamalpur

Area
  - Total: 102.73 sq mi (266.07 km^{2})
- Elevation: 102 ft (31 m)

Population (2011)
  - Total: 173,094
  - Density: 1,684.9/sq mi (650.56/km^{2})
- Time zone: UTC+5.30 (IST)
- PIN: 713421 (Raina); 713423 (Sehara)
- Telephone/STD code: 03451
- Vehicle registration: WB-37,WB-38,WB-41,WB-42,WB-44
- Literacy Rate: 80.20 per cent
- Website: http://purbabardhaman.gov.in/

Raina I (also spelled Rayna and called Raina) is a community development block that forms an administrative division in Bardhaman Sadar South subdivision Raina of Purba Bardhaman district in the Indian state of West Bengal.

== Geography ==
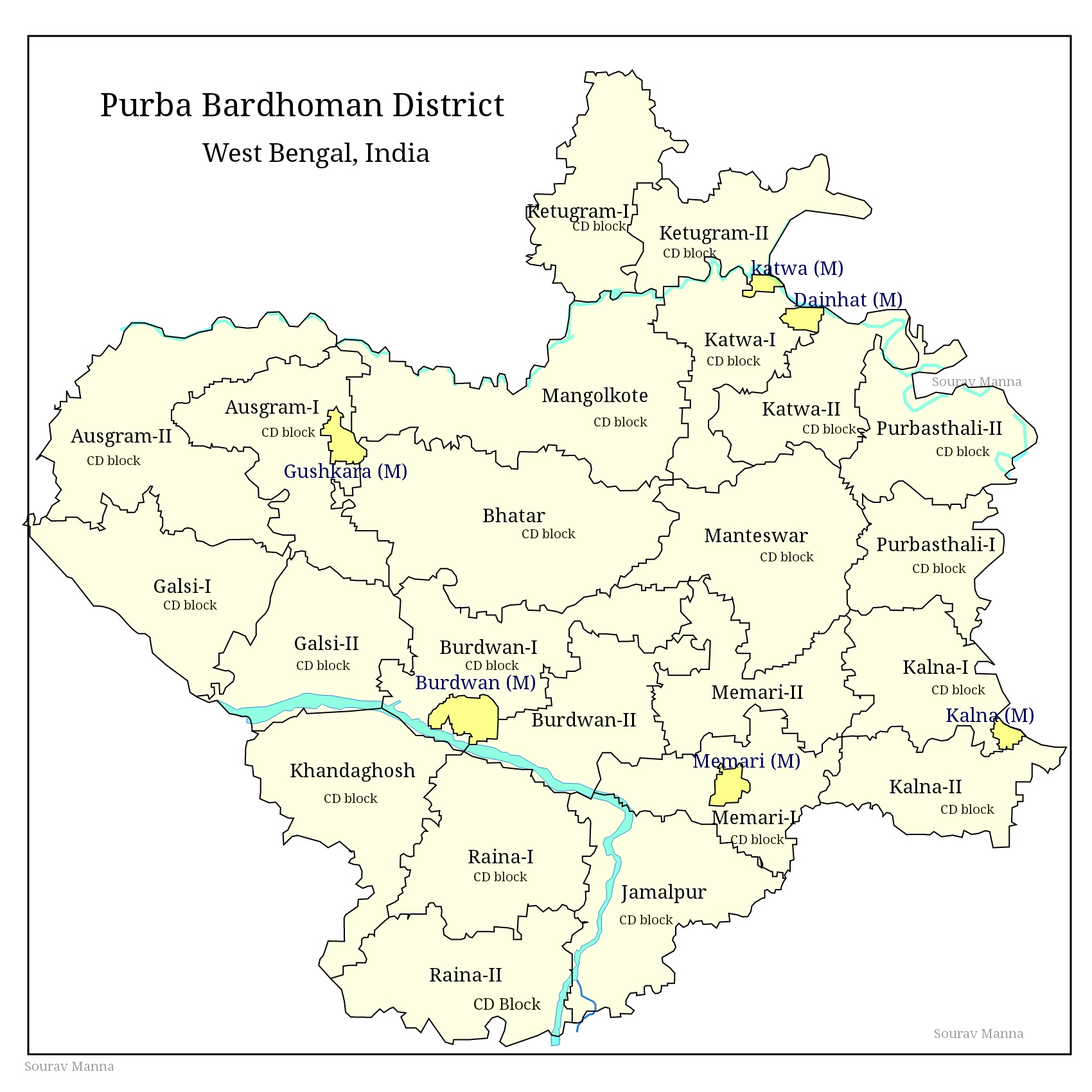
CD blocks of Purba Bardhaman district

=== Location ===
Raina is located at 23°04′07″N 87°54′22″E.

Raina I CD Block is part of the Khandaghosh Plain, which lies in the south-western part of the district, The Damodar flows through the area. The bed of the Damodar is higher than the surrounding areas and the right bank is protected against floods with embankments in portions of the south of the Damodar River. The region has alluvial soil of recent origin. Unlike the rest of Bardhaman district, which lies to the north of the Damodar River, the Khandaghosh-Jamalpur-Raina area lies on the alluvial plains between the Damodar on its southern/ eastern side and the Dwarakeswar River. As a result, it has been a flood prone area.

Raina I CD Block is bounded by Burdwan II CD Block on the north, Jamalpur CD Block on the east, Raina II CD Block in the south, and Khandaghosh CD Block on the west.

Raina I CD Block has an area of 266.07 km^{2}. It has 1 panchayat samity, 8 gram panchayats, 139 gram sansads (village councils), 113 mouzas and 110 inhabited villages. Raina police station serves this block. Headquarters of this CD Block is at Shyamsundar.

It is from this area that the Mundeswari River originates. The small Ratnela khal also originates in the region and later flows into the Ghia river in Hooghly district.

Gram panchayats of Raina I block/panchayat samiti are: Hijalna, Mugura, Narugram, Natu, Palasan, Raina, Sehara and Shyamsundar.

== Demographics ==
=== Population ===
As per the 2011 Census of India Raina I CD Block had a total population of 180,952, of which 173,094 were rural and 7,858 were urban. There were 92,392 (51%) males and 88,560 (49%) females. Population below 6 years was 18,734. Scheduled Castes numbered 62,151 (34.35%) and Scheduled Tribes numbered 10,503 (5.80%).

As per 2001 census, Raina I block had a total population of 162,921, out of which 83,633 were males and 79,288 were females. Raina I block registered a population growth of 13.71 per cent during the 1991-2001 decade. Decadal growth for Bardhaman district was 14.36 per cent. Decadal growth in West Bengal was 17.84 per cent. Scheduled castes at 54,462 formed around one-third the population. Scheduled tribes numbered 9,808.

Census Town in Raina I CD Block is (2011 census figure in brackets): Seharabazar (7,858).

Large villages (with 4,000+ population) in Raina I CD Block are (2011 census figures in brackets): Rayna (5,157), Jotsadi (4,998), Bantir (5,176), Haripur (4,992), Shyamsundar (4,903) and Dharan (4,403).

Other villages in Raina I CD Block include (2011census figures in brackets): Mugura (1,867), Palasan (3,917), Hijalgram (1,685), Narugram (3,226) and Natu (1,626).

=== Literacy ===
As per the 2011 census the total number of literates in Raina I CD Block was 130,093 (80.20% of the population over 6 years) out of which males numbered 71,005 (85.77% of the male population over 6 years) and females numbered 59,088 (74.38% of the female population over 6 years). The gender disparity (the difference between female and male literacy rates) was 11.39%.

As per 2001 census, Raina I block had a total literacy of 74.69 per cent for the 6+ age group. While male literacy was 83.01 per cent female literacy was 65.88 per cent. Bardhaman district had a total literacy of 70.18 per cent, male literacy being 78.63 per cent and female literacy being 60.95 per cent.

See also – List of West Bengal districts ranked by literacy rate

Literacy in CD blocks of
Bardhaman district
Bardhaman Sadar North subdivision
Ausgram I – 69.39%
Ausgram II – 68.00%
Bhatar – 71.56%
Burdwan I – 76.07%
Burdwan II – 74.12%
Galsi II – 70.05%
Bardhaman Sadar South subdivision
Khandaghosh – 77.28%
Raina I – 80.20%
Raina II – 81.48%
Jamalpur – 74.08%
Memari I – 74.10%
Memari II – 74.59%
Kalna subdivision
Kalna I – 75.81%
Kalna II – 76.25%
Manteswar – 73.08%
Purbasthali I – 77.59%
Purbasthali II – 70.35%
Katwa subdivision
Katwa I – 70.36%
Katwa II – 69.16%
Ketugram I – 68.00%
Ketugram II – 65.96%
Mongalkote – 67.97%
Durgapur subdivision
Andal – 77.25%
Faridpur Durgapur – 74.14%
Galsi I – 72.81%
Kanksa – 76.34%
Pandabeswar – 73.01%
Asansol subdivision
Barabani – 69.58%
Jamuria – 69.42%
Raniganj – 73.86%
Salanpur – 78.76%
2011 Census: CD Block Wise

Primary Census Abstract Data

=== Languages and religion ===
Religion in Raina I CD block (2011)
Hinduism	70.72%
Islam	28.43%
Sarna	0.61%
Other or not stated	0.24%

In the 2011 census Hindus numbered 127,978 and formed 70.72% of the population in Raina I CD Block. Muslims numbered 51,443 and formed 28.43% of the population. Christians numbered 108 and formed 0.06% of the population. Others numbered 1,423 and formed 0.79% of the population.

In Bardhaman district the percentage of Hindu population has been declining from 84.3% in 1961 to 77.9% in 2011 and the percentage of Muslim population has increased from 15.2% in 1961 to 20.7% in 2011.

Languages of Raina I CD block (2011)
1. Bengali (95.1%)
2. Santali (4.25%)
3. Others (0.67%)

At the time of the 2011 census, 95.08% of the population spoke Bengali and 4.25% Santali as their first language.

== Rural poverty ==
As per poverty estimates obtained from household survey for families living below poverty line in 2005, rural poverty in Raina I CD Block was 27.24%.

== Economy ==
=== Livelihood ===
In Raina I CD Block in 2011, amongst the class of total workers, cultivators formed 18.11%, agricultural labourers 51.83%, household industry workers 1.84% and other workers 28.21%.

Raina I CD Block is part of the area where agriculture dominates the scenario but the secondary and tertiary sectors have shown an increasing trend.

=== Infrastructure ===
There are 110 inhabited villages in Raina I CD block. All 110 villages (100%) have power supply. All 110 villages (100%) have drinking water supply. 26 villages (23.64%) have post offices. All 110 villages (100%) have telephones (including landlines, public call offices and mobile phones). 51 villages (46.36%) have a pucca (paved) approach road and 71 villages (64.55%) have transport communication (includes bus service, rail facility and navigable waterways). 27 villages (24.55%) have agricultural credit societies. 6 villages (5.45%) have banks.

In 2013-14, there were 115 fertiliser depots, 9 seed stores and 60 fair price shops in the CD Block.

=== Agriculture ===
Persons engaged in agriculture
in Raina I CD Block
1. Bargadars (6.47%)
2. Patta holders (11.4%)
3. Small farmers (8.29%)
4. Marginal farmers (25.0%)
5. Agricultural labourers (48.8%)

Although the Bargadari Act of 1950 recognised the rights of bargadars to a higher share of crops from the land that they tilled, it was not implemented fully. Large tracts, beyond the prescribed limit of land ceiling, remained with the rich landlords. From 1977 onwards major land reforms took place in West Bengal. Land in excess of land ceiling was acquired and distributed amongst the peasants. Following land reforms land ownership pattern has undergone transformation. In 2013-14, persons engaged in agriculture Raina I could be classified as follows: bargadars 6.47%, patta (document) holders 11.45%, small farmers (possessing land between 1 and 2 hectares) 8.29%, marginal farmers (possessing land up to 1 hectare) 25.00% and agricultural labourers 48.79%.

In 2003-04 net cropped area in Raina I Block was 20,726 hectares and the area in which more than one crop was grown was 16,500 hectares.

In 2013-14, Raina I CD Block produced 141,339 tonnes of Aman paddy, the main winter crop, from 42,057 hectares, 14,648 tonnes of Boro paddy (spring crop) from 3,600 hectares, 541 tonnes of wheat from 202 hectares and 22,841 tonnes of potatoes from 1,966 hectares. It also produced pulses and oilseeds.

In Bardhaman district as a whole Aman paddy constituted 64.32% of the total area under paddy cultivation, while the area under Boro and Aus paddy constituted 32.87% and 2.81% respectively. The expansion of Boro paddy cultivation, with higher yield rates, was the result of expansion of irrigation system and intensive cropping. In 2013-14, the total area irrigated in Raina I CD Block was 15,687.01 hectares, out of which 13,148.67 hectares were irrigated by canal water, 232.19 hectares by river lift irrigation and 2,306.15 hectares by deep tube wells.

=== Banking ===
In 2013-14, Raina I CD Block had offices of 7 commercial banks and 1 gramin bank.

== Transport ==
Raina I CD Block has 8 ferry services and 8 originating/ terminating bus routes.

DEMU services are available between Bankura and Masagram on the Bankura-Masagram line. There are stations at Berugram, Mathnasipur, Rainagar, Shyamsundarpur, Gopinathpur and Seharabazar.

SH 7 running from Rajgram (in Birbhum district) to Midnapore (in Paschim Medinipur district) passes through the western edge of this CD Block.

== Education ==
The Raina area had not lagged behind in education. In 1838, a survey by Adams revealed that there were 190 Sanskrit tols in Bardhaman district. Out of this 13 were in Raina. The same report also mentioned Persian schools in the area. In 1947, at the time of independence there were only three colleges in Bardhaman district – at Bardhaman, Kalna and Asansol. Shyamsundar College in Raina I CD Block was established in 1948.

In 2013-14, Raina I CD Block had 128 primary schools with 9,391 students, 6 middle schools with 414 students, 15 high schools with 9,037 students and 12 higher secondary schools with 12,194 students. Raina I CD Block had 1 general college with 3,544 students, and 281 institutions for special and non-formal education with 8,705 students.

As per the 2011 census, in Raina I CD block, amongst the 110 inhabited villages, 5 villages did not have schools, 21 villages had two or more primary schools, 25 villages had at least 1 primary and 1 middle school and 20 villages had at least 1 middle and 1 secondary school.

More than 6,000 schools (in erstwhile Bardhaman district) serve cooked midday meal to more than 900,000 students.

== Healthcare ==
In 2014, Raina I CD Block had 1 block primary health centre, 3 primary health centres and 4 private nursing homes with total 51 beds and 6 doctors (excluding private bodies). It had 26 family welfare subcentres. 1,888 patients were treated indoor and 178,702 patients were treated outdoor in the hospitals, health centres and subcentres of the CD Block.

Maheshbati Rural Hospital at Maheshbati (with 30 beds) is the main medical facility in Raina I CD block. There are primary health centres at Meral (with 4 beds), Narugram (with 6 beds) and Shyamsundar (with 10 beds).

Raina I CD Block is one of the areas of Bardhaman district which is affected by a low level of arsenic contamination of ground water.
