= Rash Behari Ghosh =

Indian politician (1845–1921)

Sir Rash Behari Ghosh CSI CIE
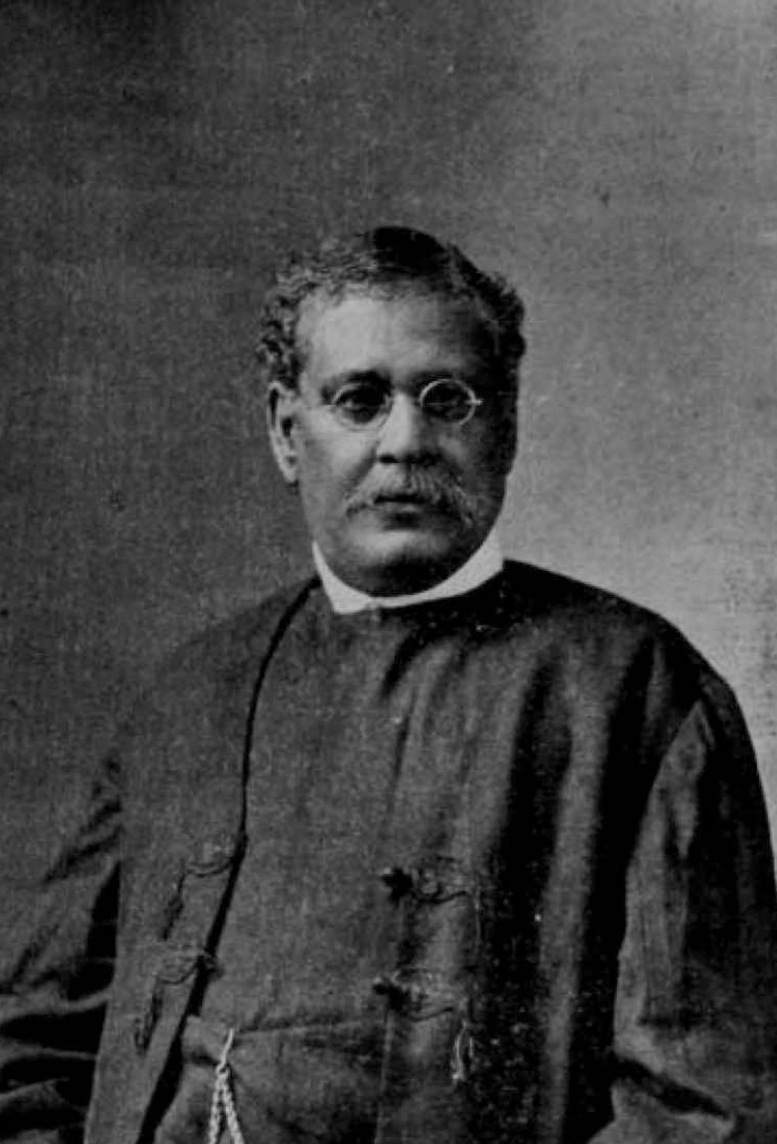
- Born: 23 December 1845; Khandaghosh, Burdwan district, British India
- Died: 23 February 1921 (aged 75); British India
- Education: Burdwan Raj Collegiate School, Presidency College, Kolkata
- Occupations: Politician, lawyer, social worker & philanthropist
- Organizations: National Council of Education
- Movement: Indian National Congress

Sir Rash Behari Ghosh CSI CIE (23 December 1845 – 28 February 1921) was an Indian politician, lawyer, social worker and philanthropist.

== Early life and education ==
Rashbehari Ghosh was born on 23 December 1845 in Torkona village in Khandaghosh area. His family belonged to the Hindu Sadgop and resided in Purba Bardhaman district, Bengal Presidency. He attended Burdwan Raj Collegiate School and Presidency College, Kolkata. He obtained a first class in the MA examination in English. In 1871, he passed the Law examination with honours and was awarded the Doctor of Laws degree in 1884.

== Political career ==
Ghosh became a member of the Indian National Congress and leaned towards the moderate wing. He had deep faith in progress, but was opposed to radicalism in any form. He served as the President of the Congress for two terms. First in the historic 1907 Surat Session, succeeding Dadabhai Naoroji, after which the Congress split into Moderates and Extremists, and then the year after in Madras, 1908.

Ghosh was a member of the Bengal Legislative Council (1891–94, 1906–09) and the Council of India. He was appointed a Companion of the Order of the Indian Empire (CIE) in the 1896 New Year Honours and appointed a Companion of the Order of the Star of India (CSI) in the 1909 Birthday Honours. He was knighted in the 1915 New Year Honours and conferred with his knighthood on 14 July of that year.

== Contributions ==
Ghosh's contributions earned him a series of honours, such as the Tagore Law Professorship (1875–76) at Calcutta University and an honorary DL degree from Calcutta University (1884).

He made a fortune through his legal practice, but donated much of it by way of charity and endowments. He established Torkona Jagabandhu School (1894). In 1913, he established an endowment for scientific studies at Calcutta University with an initial capital of ten lakh rupees. He also donated 13 lakh rupees to establish a National Council of Education (NCE) at Jadavpur. It later became Jadavpur University. Ghosh was the first president of NCE.

Keeping in line with his ideals, Sir Rashbehari Ghosh Mahavidyalaya was established at Ukhrid in Khandaghosh CD Block in 2010. He also established schools and hospital in his village.

He donated a princely sum (almost 33% of financial expenditure) to Acharya Praffulla Roy for establishing Bengal Chemical and Pharmaceutical Works.

== Street named after Ghosh in Kolkata ==
Considering the contributions made by Ghosh for the people of India, a street was named after him in Kolkata. Rashbehari Avenue, named after him, starts from Chetla-Sahanagar Bridge (Shaheed Jatin Das Setu) and runs eastwards to Ballygunge and Gariahat.

== Legacy ==
His house in Burdwan District at R. B Ghosh Road has been kept intact. His family members still reside there. Few of his descendants had been in the legal profession. One of his brothers Sir Bipin Behari Ghosh was Hon'ble Judge of Calcutta High Court before independence. As he was fond of technical education, few of his grand children are into the stream of engineering. His great grand daughter Dr. Suravi Ghosh is a practicing advocate of hon'ble Calcutta High Court.
