= State Highway 7 (West Bengal) =

Highway in West Bengal, India

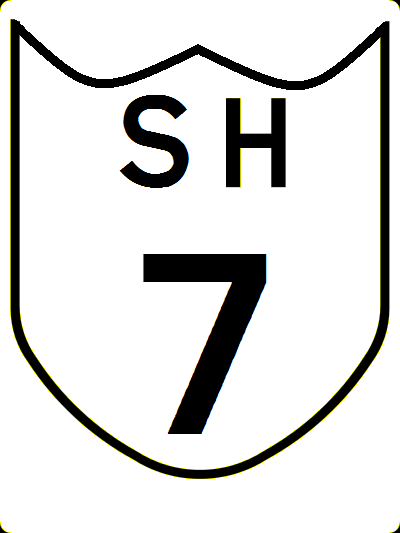
State Highway 7

Route information
- Length: 289 km (180 mi)

Major junctions
- From: Rajgram
- NH 14 from Nalhati to Morgram; SH 11 at Kuli; SH 6 at Kurmodanga; SH 14 at Muratipur; Guskara Road at Obaidullah Market near Chandipur; Katwa-Bardhaman Road at Narja Chati; SH 8 from Mirzapur to Bankura Morh; NH 114/GT Road from Mehedi Bagan to Perbhirhata; NH 19 flyover near Sripally; SH 2 at Arambagh; SH 4 from Khirpai to Chandrakona; Keshpur-Daspur Road at Keshpur
- To: Midnapore – Junction with NH 14

Location
- Country: India
- State: West Bengal
- Districts: Birbhum, Purba Bardhaman, Hooghly and Howrah

Highway system
- Roads in India; Expressways; National; State; Asian; State Highways in West Bengal

State Highway 7 (West Bengal) is a state highway in West Bengal, India.

== Route ==
SH 7 originates from Rajgram (the road extends up to Kanupur on NH 12) and passes through Murarai, Nalhati, Lohapur (it is a little off the highway), Morgram, Khargram, Nagar, Burwan, Nutanhat, Mongalkote, Mirzapur, Bardhaman, Sagrai, Badulia, Seharabazar, Arambag, Kamarpukur, Gar Mandaran, Khirpai, Chandrakona, Keshpur and terminates in junction with NH 14 at Midnapore.

The total length of SH 7 is 289 km.

Districts traversed by SH 7 are:
Birbhum district (0 – 31 km)
Murshiadabad (31-100)
Purba Bardhaman district (100 – 196) km
Hooghly district (196 – 226 km)
Paschim Medinipur district (226-289)

== Road sections ==
It is divided into different sections as follows:

Road Section	District	CD Block	Length (km)
Rajgram-Nalhati	Birbhum	Murarai I, Nalhati I	31
Nalhati-Morgram via NH 14	Birbhum	Nalhati II	-
Morgram-Alinagar	Murshidabad	Sagardighi, Nabagram	20
Alinagar-Kulee	Murshidabad	Khargram	20
Kulee-Ramjibanpur	Murshidabad	Burwan	29
Ramjibanpur-Palita-Palitapur-Natunhat	Purba Bardhaman	Ketugram I, Mongolkote	29
Natunhat-Muraripur-Karjona	Purba Bardhaman	Bhatar	19
Karjona-Bardhaman	Purba Bardhaman	Burdwan I, Burdwan II	15
Bardhaman-Arambagh (Purba Bardhaman portion)	Purba Bardhaman	Khandaghosh, Raina I, Raina II	33
Bardhaman-Arambagh (Hooghly portion)	Hooghly	Arambagh	9
Arambagh-Goghat-Ramjibanpur	Hooghly	Goghat I, Goghat II	21
Ramjibanpur-Khirpai	Paschim Medinipur	Chandrakona I	18
Chandrakona-Keshpur	Paschim Medinipur	Chandrakona II, Keshpur	21
Keshpur-Midnapore	Paschim Medinipur	Midnapore Sadar	24

== See also ==
- List of state highways in West Bengal
