= Badulia =

- Village
- Location in West Bengal, India Badulia (India)
- Coordinates: 23.145833°N 87.808333°E
- Country: India
- State: West Bengal
- District: Purba Bardhaman

Population (2011)
  - Total: 3,905

Languages
  - Official: Bengali, English
- Time zone: UTC+5:30 (IST)
- Lok Sabha constituency: Bishnupur
- Vidhan Sabha constituency: Khandaghosh
- Website: purbabardhaman.gov.in

Badulia is a village in Khandaghosh CD Block in Bardhaman Sadar South subdivisionof the Purba Bardhaman district in the state of West Bengal in India.

== Geography ==
Badulia is at an average elevation of 35 meters. It lies to the south of the Damodar River, on the alluvial plains between the Damodar and the Dwarakeswar River rivers. As a result, it has been a flood-prone area.

Badulia is 18 km from Khandaghosh and 12 km from Bardhaman. Most of the village falls on the west side of the Burdwan—Arambag Road. The Ghanaram Chakraborty Sarani, originating perpendicularly from the Burdwan—Arambag, road bisects the village.

=== Administration ===
The village Badulia is in the Sagrai Gram Pachayet. The panchayat office is located in the central area of the village. The Block Development Office is 1 km from the Badulia bus stop.

== Demographics ==
As per the 2011 Census of India Badulia had a total population of 3,905, of which 2,011 (51%) were males and 1,894 (49%) were females. Population below 6 years was 408. The total number of literates in Badulia was 2,778 (79.44% of the population over 6 years).

== Health ==
After long years of independence there is no public health system in this village. as this village is well connected with the district headquarters and its district hospital and private hospital people has not suffered too much. Apart from that though there is scarcity of expert medical practitioner in this village there are a few numbers of private pharmacy and elementary practitioners who serves in minor cases.

== Politics ==
In more recent years, as of 2017, there has been a dramatic change in the election scenario of this area. TMC won the Bishnupur Lok Sabha seat in 2014. It won the Khandaghosh Vidhan Sabha seat in 2016. In the Khandaghosh Panchayat Samiti election in 2013, TMC won 17 seats against 8 of CPI(M), 3 independents and 1 RSP.

For an overview of the economy etc. see Khandaghosh (community development block) and Bardhaman Sadar South subdivision

The major political party in this village was Communist Party of India (Marxist). The other political parties were All India Trinamool Congress (AITC), Bharatiya Janata Party (BJP) and Communist Party of Bharat (CPB). In this area all the portfolio from gram panchayet to Member of Parliament were from CPI(M).
