= Jamalpur, Bardhaman =

Jamalpur
- Village
- Location in West Bengal, India Jamalpur (India)
- Coordinates: 23°03′45.4″N 87°59′31.6″E
- Country: India
- State: West Bengal
- District: Purba Bardhaman

Languages
  - Official: Bengali, English
- Time zone: UTC+5:30 (IST)
- PIN: 713408 (Jamalpur)
- Telephone/STD code: 03451
- Lok Sabha constituency: Bardhaman Purba
- Vidhan Sabha constituency: Jamalpur
- Website: purbabardhaman.gov.in

Jamalpur is a village in Jamalpur CD block in Bardhaman Sadar South subdivision of Purba Bardhaman district in the state of West Bengal, India.

== Geography ==
Cities and towns in the Bardhaman Sadar South subdivision of Purba Bardhaman district
M: municipal city/ town, CT: census town, R: rural/ urban centre, H: historical/ religious centre
Owing to space constraints in the small map, the actual locations in a larger map may vary slightly

=== Urbanisation ===
95.54% of the population of Bardhaman Sadar South subdivision live in the rural areas. Only 4.46% of the population live in the urban areas, and that is the lowest proportion of urban population amongst the four subdivisions in Purba Bardhaman district. The map alongside presents some of the notable locations in the subdivision. All places marked in the map are linked in the larger full screen map.

=== Police station ===
Jamalpur police station has jurisdiction over Jamalpur CD Block. The area covered is 267.89 km^{2}.

=== CD block HQ ===
The headquarters of Jamalpur CD block are located at Jamalpur.

== Demographics ==
In the data published by the 2011 Census of India there is no mention of Jamalpur village, although Jamalpur community development block finds a place in the census data. Similarly, many villages around Jamalpur are mentioned (2011 census figure in brackets): Radhaballabbati (1,820), Jot Raghab (3,204), Jotkrishtai (1,328), Khanpur (2,384), Kanshra (3,220), Uttar Mohanpur (939), Halara (1,309), Krishna Chandra pur (2208), Hotatpara (119) and other villages.

== Transport ==
The SH 15, running from Dainhat (in Bardhaman district) to Gadiara (in Howrah district) via Tarakeswar passes through Jamalpur. Bus services available for Bardhaman, Memari, Tarakeswar and other some routes.

== Education ==
Jamalpur Mahavidyalaya was established in 2010. It offers undergraduate-level honours courses in Bengali, English, Sanskrit, history, political science and philosophy.

== Healthcare ==
Jamalpur Rural Hospital at Jamalpur (with 30 beds) is the main medical facility in Jamalpur CD block. There are primary health centres at Chakdighi (with 10 beds), Chaksmanjari (with 10 beds), Illasora (with 4 beds) and Nabagram (with 4 beds).
