= Raina, Bardhaman =

Raina
- Small Town
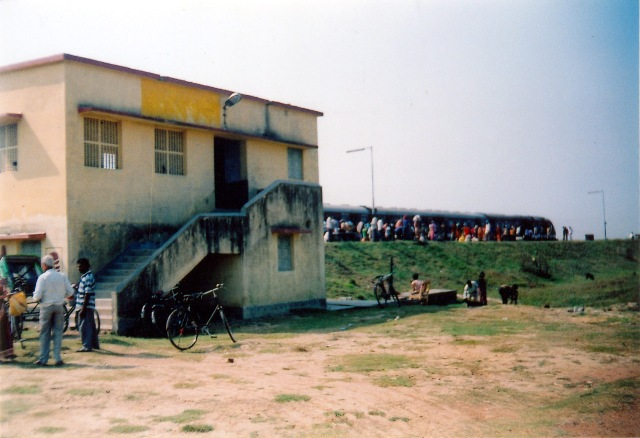

- Location in West Bengal, India Raina (India)
- Coordinates: 23°04′07.0″N 87°54′22.0″E
- Country: India
- State: West Bengal
- District: Purba Bardhaman

Population (2011)
  - Total: 7,000

Languages
  - Official: Bengali, English
- Time zone: UTC+5:30 (IST)
- Telephone/STD code: 03451
- Lok Sabha constituency: Bardhaman Purba
- Vidhan Sabha constituency: Raina
- Website: purbabardhaman.gov.in

Raina is a Town in Raina I CD block in Bardhaman Sadar South subdivision of Purba Bardhaman district in the Indian state of West Bengal.

== Geography ==
Cities and towns in the Bardhaman Sadar South subdivision of Purba Bardhaman district
M: municipal city/ town, CT: census town, R: rural/ urban centre, H: historical/ religious centre.
Owing to space constraints in the small map, the actual locations in a larger map may vary slightly

=== Urbanisation ===
95.54% of the population of Bardhaman Sadar South subdivision live in rural areas versus 4.46% in urban areas, the lowest proportion of urban population amongst the four subdivisions in Purba Bardhaman district.

== Services ==
Raina police station has jurisdiction over Raina I CD Block. The area covered is 266.43 km^{2}.

== Demographics ==
As per the 2011 Census of India Raina had a total population of 7000, of which 3600 (51%) were males and 3400, (49%) were females. Population under 6 was 494. The total number of literates in Raina was 3,999 (83.04% of the population over 6 years).

== Transport ==
Rainagar railway station is on the Bankura-Mathnasipur sector of Bankura-Masagram line in Raina. As of January 2019, DEMU services are available between Bankura and Masagram.

Raina is connected with Burdwan town, Tarokeshor, Memary by road.

== Education ==
Raina's education system was strong even before independence. Raina Swami Bholananda Vidyayatan (RSBV)was established in 1894, meeting the higher secondary standard. Raina Jagathmata Anchalik Balika Vidyalaya, was established in 1963 by a Muslim education activists. Professionals such as engineers, professors, doctor, postgraduates, administrators and teachers attended RSBV.

== Healthcare ==
Maheshbati Rural Hospital at Maheshbati is located nearby.
