= Khandaghosh (community development block) =

- Community development block
- Location in West Bengal
- Coordinates: 23°12′47″N 87°41′23″E
- Country: India
- State: West Bengal
- District: Purba Bardhaman
- Parliamentary constituency: Bishnupur
- Assembly constituency: Khandaghosh

Area
  - Total: 102.41 sq mi (265.23 km^{2})
- Elevation: 161 ft (49 m)

Population (2011)
  - Total: 189,336
  - Density: 1,848.9/sq mi (713.86/km^{2})
- Time zone: UTC+5.30 (IST)
- PIN: 713142 (Khandaghosh)
- Telephone/STD code: 03451
- Vehicle registration: WB-37,WB-38,WB-41,WB-42,WB-44
- Literacy Rate: 77.28 percent
- Website: http://purbabardhaman.gov.in/

Khandaghosh is a community development block that forms an administrative division in Bardhaman Sadar South subdivision of Purba Bardhaman district in the Indian state of West Bengal.

== History ==
In Peterson's District Gazetteer of 1910 there is mention of Khandaghosh and other police stations in Bardhaman subdivision.

== Geography ==
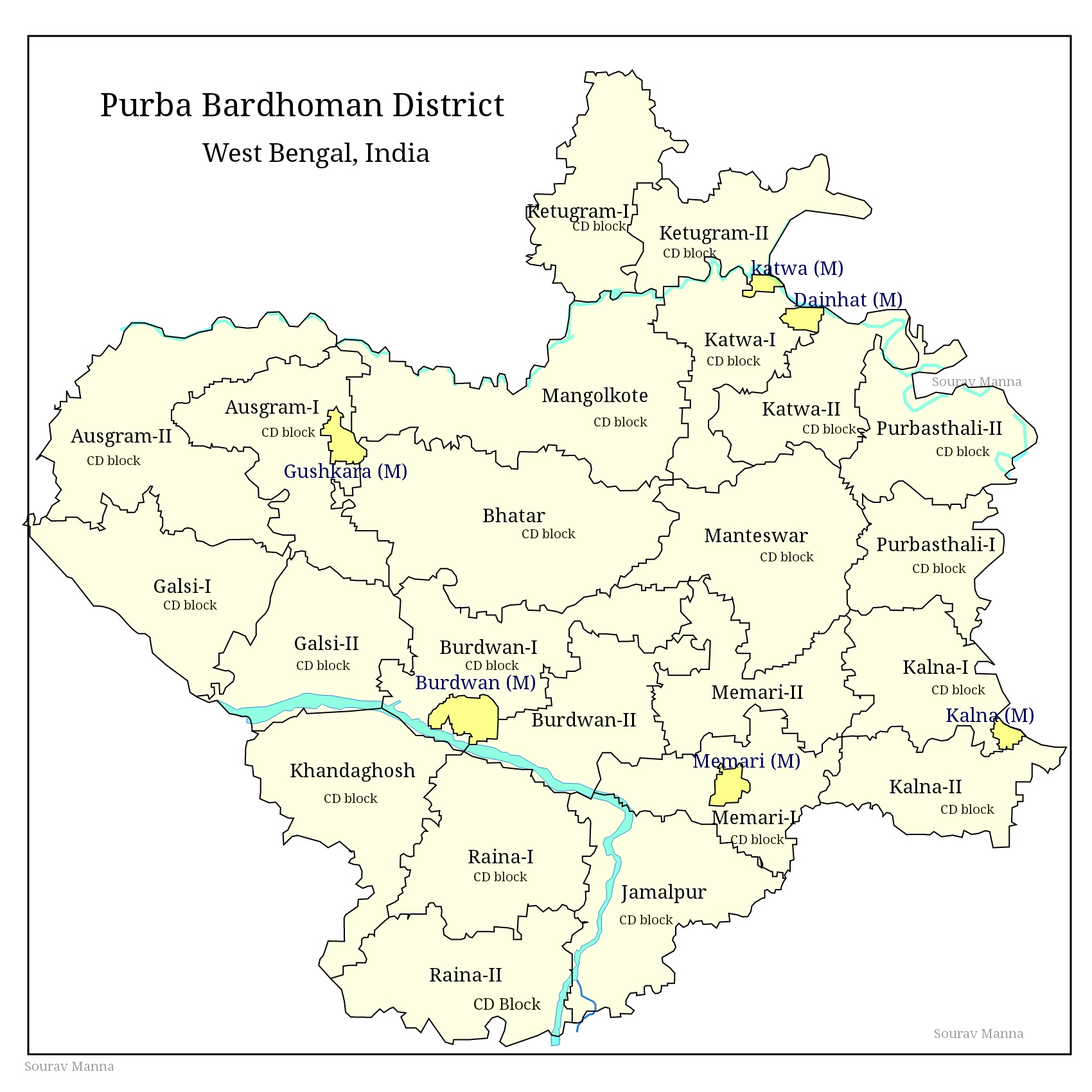
CD blocks of Purba Bardhaman district

=== Location ===
Khandaghosh is located at 23°12′47″N 87°41′23″E.

Khandaghosh CD Block is part of the Khandaghosh Plain, which lies in the south-western part of the district, The Damodar flows through the area. The bed of the Damodar is higher than the surrounding areas and the right bank is protected against floods with embankments in portions of the south of the Damodar River. The region has alluvial soil of recent origin. Unlike the rest of Bardhaman district, which lies to the north of the Damodar River, the Khandaghosh-Jamalpur-Raina area lies on the alluvial plains between the Damodar on its northern/ eastern side and the Dwarakeswar River. As a result, it has been a flood prone area.

Khandaghosh CD Block is bounded by Galsi II and Burdwan I CD Blocks on the north, Raina I and Raina II CD Blocks on the east, Goghat II CD Block, in Hooghly district, in a small section of the south, and Indas CD Block, in Bankura district, on the south and west.

Khandaghosh CD Block has an area of 265.23 km^{2}. It has 1 panchayat samity, 10 gram panchayats, 143 gram sansads (village councils), 111 mouzas and 107 inhabited villages. Khandaghosh police station serves this block. Headquarters of this CD Block is at Sagrai.

Gram panchayats of Khandaghosh block/panchayat samiti are: Berugram, Gopalbera, Kaiyor, Khandaghosh, Lodna, Sagrai, Sankari I, Sankari II, Sasanga and Ukhrid.

== Demographics ==
=== Population ===
As per the 2011 Census of India Khandaghosh CD Block had a total population of 189,336, all of which were rural. There were 97,092 (51%) males and 92,244 (49%) females. Population below 6 years was 21,168. Scheduled Castes numbered 73,478 (38.81%) and Scheduled Tribes numbered 4,345 (2.29%).

As per 2001 census, Khandaghosh block had a total population of 170,310, out of which 87,671 were males and 82,639 were females. Khandaghosh block registered a population growth of 15.03 per cent during the 1991-2001 decade. Decadal growth for Bardhaman district was 14.36 per cent. Decadal growth in West Bengal was 17.84 per cent. Scheduled castes at 64,192 formed more than one-third the population. Scheduled tribes numbered 4,180.

Large villages (with 4,000+ population) in Khandaghosh CD Block are (2011 census figures in brackets): Khandaghosh (7,717), Berugram (6,852), Bonwai (4,054), Ukhrid (6,896), Sankari (4,776), Onari (6,008), Kamalpur (9,757) and Induti (4,610).

Other villages in Khandaghosh CD Block include (2011 census figures in brackets): Badulia (3,905), Sashanga (1,253), Lodna (2,780), Sagrai (1,755), Gopalbera (3,095), Kumirkola (1,731) and Muidhara (1,376).

=== Literacy ===
As per the 2011 census the total number of literates in Khandaghosh CD Block was 129,963 (77.28% of the population over 6 years) out of which males numbered 72,449 (83.96% of the male population over 6 years) and females numbered 57,514 (70.25% of the female population over 6 years). The gender disparity (the difference between female and male literacy rates) was 13.71%.

As per 2001 census, Khandaghosh block had a total literacy of 72.82 per cent for the 6+ age group. While male literacy was 81.55 per cent female literacy was 63.57 per cent. Bardhaman district had a total literacy of 70.18 per cent, male literacy being 78.63 per cent and female literacy being 60.95 per cent.

See also – List of West Bengal districts ranked by literacy rate

Literacy in CD blocks of
Bardhaman district
Bardhaman Sadar North subdivision
Ausgram I – 69.39%
Ausgram II – 68.00%
Bhatar – 71.56%
Burdwan I – 76.07%
Burdwan II – 74.12%
Galsi II – 70.05%
Bardhaman Sadar South subdivision
Khandaghosh – 77.28%
Raina I – 80.20%
Raina II – 81.48%
Jamalpur – 74.08%
Memari I – 74.10%
Memari II – 74.59%
Kalna subdivision
Kalna I – 75.81%
Kalna II – 76.25%
Manteswar – 73.08%
Purbasthali I – 77.59%
Purbasthali II – 70.35%
Katwa subdivision
Katwa I – 70.36%
Katwa II – 69.16%
Ketugram I – 68.00%
Ketugram II – 65.96%
Mongalkote – 67.97%
Durgapur subdivision
Andal – 77.25%
Faridpur Durgapur – 74.14%
Galsi I – 72.81%
Kanksa – 76.34%
Pandabeswar – 73.01%
Asansol subdivision
Barabani – 69.58%
Jamuria – 69.42%
Raniganj – 73.86%
Salanpur – 78.76%
2011 Census: CD Block Wise

Primary Census Abstract Data

=== Languages and religion ===
Religion in Khandaghosh CD block (2011)
| Hinduism | 67.17% |
| Islam | 32.47% |
| Other or not stated | 0.36% |

In the 2011 census Hindus numbered 127,175 and formed 67.17% of the population in Khandaghosh CD Block. Muslims numbered 61,482 and formed 32.47% of the population. Christians numbered 74 and formed 0.04% of the population. Others numbered 605 and formed 0.32% of the population.

In Bardhaman district the percentage of Hindu population has been declining from 84.3% in 1961 to 77.9% in 2011 and the percentage of Muslim population has increased from 15.2% in 1961 to 20.7% in 2011.

Languages of Khandaghosh CD block (2011)
1. Bengali (97.6%)
2. Santali (1.48%)
3. Others (0.91%)

At the time of the 2011 census, 97.61% of the population spoke Bengali and 1.48% Santali as their first language.

== Rural poverty ==
As per poverty estimates obtained from household survey for families living below poverty line in 2005, rural poverty in Khandaghosh CD Block was 32.35%.

== Economy ==
=== Livelihood ===
In Khandaghosh CD Block in 2011, amongst the class of total workers, cultivators formed 18.90%, agricultural labourers 55.37%, household industry workers 2.13% and other workers 23.60%.

Khandaghosh CD Block is part of the area where agriculture dominates the scenario but the secondary and tertiary sectors have shown an increasing trend.

=== Infrastructure ===
There are 107 inhabited villages in Khandaghosh CD block. All 107 villages (100%) have power supply. All 107 villages (100%) have drinking water supply. 31 villages (28.97%) have post offices. 102 villages (95.33%) have telephones (including landlines, public call offices and mobile phones). 61 villages (57.01%) have a pucca (paved) approach road and 79 villages (73.83%) have transport communication (includes bus service, rail facility and navigable waterways). 23 villages (21.50%) have agricultural credit societies. 14 villages (13.08%) have banks.

In 2013–14, there were 114 fertiliser depots, 18 seed stores and 55 fair price shops in the CD Block.

=== Agriculture ===
Persons engaged in agriculture
in Khandaghosh CD Block
1. Bargadars (9.37%)
2. Patta holders (15.2%)
3. Small farmers (5.91%)
4. Marginal farmers (18.3%)
5. Agricultural labourers (51.2%)

Although the Bargadari Act of 1950 recognised the rights of bargadars to a higher share of crops from the land that they tilled, it was not implemented fully. Large tracts, beyond the prescribed limit of land ceiling, remained with the rich landlords. From 1977 onwards major land reforms took place in West Bengal. Land in excess of land ceiling was acquired and distributed amongst the peasants. Following land reforms land ownership pattern has undergone transformation. In 2013–14, persons engaged in agriculture Khandaghosh could be classified as follows: bargadars 9.37%, patta (document) holders 15.21%, small farmers (possessing land between 1 and 2 hectares) 5.91%, marginal farmers (possessing land up to 1 hectare) 18.26% and agricultural labourers 51.25%.

In 2003-04 net cropped area in Khandaghosh Block was 21,000 hectares and the area in which more than one crop was grown was 12,690 hectares.

In 2013–14, Khandaghosh CD Block produced 62,838 tonnes of Aman paddy, the main winter crop, from 21,257 hectares, 1,143 tonnes of Aus paddy (summer crop) from 427 hectares, 23,098 tonnes of Boro paddy (spring crop) from 8,386 hectares, 121 tonnes of wheat from 45 hectares and 44,164 tonnes of potatoes from 2,092 hectares. It also produced pulses and oilseeds.

In Bardhaman district as a whole Aman paddy constituted 64.32% of the total area under paddy cultivation, while the area under Boro and Aus paddy constituted 32.87% and 2.81% respectively. The expansion of Boro paddy cultivation, with higher yield rates, was the result of expansion of irrigation system and intensive cropping. In 2013–14, the total area irrigated in Khandaghosh CD Block was 16,100.23 hectares, out of which 15,232.80 hectares were irrigated by canal water and 867.43 hectares by deep tube wells.

=== Banking ===
In 2013–14, Khandaghosh CD Block had offices of 9 commercial banks and 3 gramin banks.

== Transport ==
Khandaghosh CD Block has 8 originating/ terminating bus routes.

DEMU services are available between Bankura and Masagram on the Bankura-Masagram line. There are stations at Kaiyar and Guir Saranga.

SH 7 running from Rajgram (in Birbhum district) to Midnapore (in Paschim Medinipur district) passes through this CD Block.

== Education ==
In 2013–14, Khandaghosh CD Block had 142 primary schools with 11,221 students, 6 middle schools with 427 students, 13 high schools with 7,279 students and 11 higher secondary schools with 9,256 students. Khandaghosh CD Block had 1 general college with 1,123 students and 303 institutions for special and non-formal education with 10,424 students.

As per the 2011 census, in Khandaghosh CD block, amongst the 107 inhabited villages, 2 villages did not have schools, 43 villages had two or more primary schools, 37 villages had at least 1 primary and 1 middle school and 26 villages had at least 1 middle and 1 secondary school.

More than 6,000 schools (in erstwhile Bardhaman district) serve cooked midday meal to more than 900,000 students.

Sir Rashbehari Ghosh Mahavidyalaya was established at Ukhrid in 2010.

== Healthcare ==
A dispensary was set up at Khandaghosh as early as 1804.

In 2014, Khandaghosh CD Block had 1 block primary health centre and 3 primary health centres with total 29 beds and 4 doctors (excluding private bodies). It had 26 family welfare subcentres. 397 patients were treated indoor and 204,044 patients were treated outdoor in the hospitals, health centres and subcentres of the CD Block.

Khandaghosh block primary health centre at Khandaghosh (with 15 beds) is the main medical facility in Khandaghosh CD block. There are primary health centres at Khudkuri, PO Sankari (with 4 beds), Kuley (Gayeshpur), PO Chagram (with 10 beds) and Torkona (with 4 beds).

Khandaghosh CD Block is one of the areas of Bardhaman district which is affected by a low level of arsenic contamination of ground water.

== Notable people ==
- Rash Behari Ghosh, politician, lawyer, social worker and philanthropist
- Batukeshwar Dutt, revolutionary leader
