= Memari II =

- Community development block
- Location in West Bengal
- Coordinates: 23°15′55″N 88°08′59″E
- Country: India
- State: West Bengal
- District: Purba Bardhaman
- Parliamentary constituency: Bardhaman Purba, Bardhaman-Durgapur
- Assembly constituency: Memari, Manteswar

Area
  - Total: 72.14 sq mi (186.84 km^{2})
- Elevation: 79 ft (24 m)

Population (2011)
  - Total: 150,252
  - Density: 2,082.8/sq mi (804.17/km^{2})
- Time zone: UTC+5.30 (IST)
- PIN: 713168 (Paharhati); 713421 (Barapalasan); 713422 (Satgachia)
- Telephone/STD code: 0342
- Vehicle registration: WB-37,WB-38,WB-41,WB-42,WB-44
- Literacy Rate: 74.59 per cent
- Website: http://purbabardhaman.gov.in/

Memari II is a community development block that forms an administrative division in Bardhaman Sadar South subdivision of Purba Bardhaman district]] in the Indian state of West Bengal.

== History ==
During the reign of Mughal emperor Shah Alam II, Munshi Syed Sadruddin (d. 1796) was appointed as the mutawalli (guardian) of the Baish Hazari pargana. He constructed a large madrasa and library in Bohar called Madrasa-i-Jalalia, in honour of Jalaluddin Tabrizi, which produced hundreds of ulama including Ghulam Mustafa Burdwani, Izharul Haque, Abdur Rab Lucknowi, Abdur Rahman Lucknowi and Nurul Haque Ansari.

== Geography ==
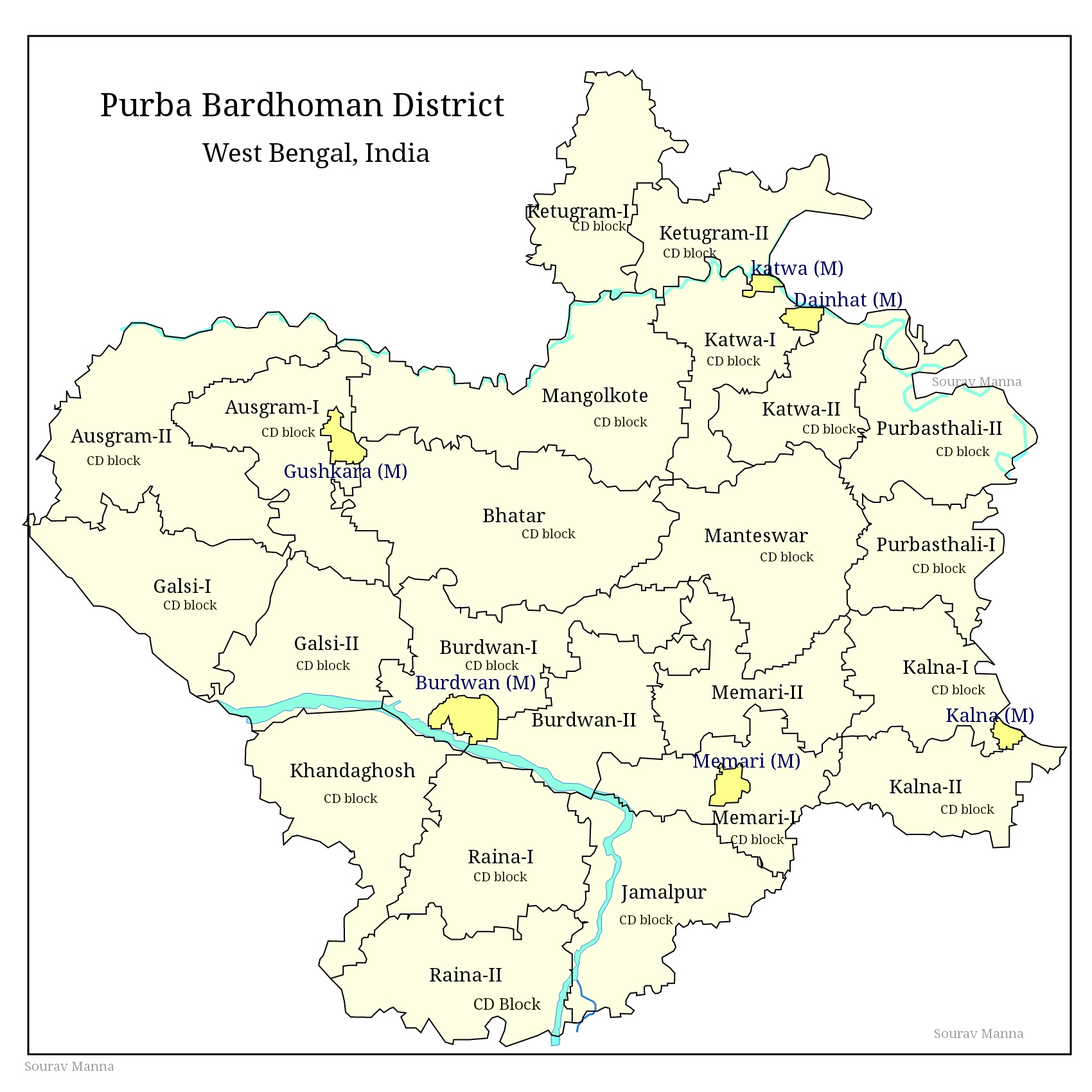
CD blocks of Purba Bardhaman district

=== Location ===
Satgachia, a constituent panchayat of Memari II block, is located at 23°15′55″N 88°08′59″E.

Memari II CD Block is part of the Bardhaman Plain, the central plain area of the district. The area is surrounded by the Bhagirathi on the east, the Ajay on the north-west and the Damodar on the west and south. Old river channels and small creeks found in the region dry up in the dry season, but the Bardhaman Plains are sometimes subject to heavy floods during the rainy season. The region has recent alluvial soils.

Memari II CD Block is bounded by Manteswar CD Block on the north, Kalna I CD Block on the east, Memari I CD Block on the south and Burdwan I and Burdwan II CD Blocks on the west.

Memari II CD Block has an area of 186.84 km^{2}. It has 1 panchayat samity, 9 gram panchayats, 115 gram sansads (village councils), 89 mouzas and 88 inhabited villages. Memari police station serves this block. Headquarters of this CD Block is at Paharhati.

Gram panchayats of Memari II block/panchayat samiti are: Barapalason I, Barapalason II, Bijpur I, Bijpur II, Bohar I, Bohar II, Kuchut, Satgachia I and Satgachia II.

== Demographics ==
=== Population ===
As per the 2011 Census of India Memari II CD Block had a total population of 150,252, all of which were rural. There were 76,500 (51%) males and 73,752 (49%) females. Population below 6 years was 15,567. Scheduled Castes numbered 35,933 (23.92%) and Scheduled Tribes numbered 27,676 (18.42%).

As per the 2001 census, Memari II block had a total population of 135,621, out of which 69,486 were males and 66,135 were females. Memari II block registered a population growth of 13.67 per cent during the 1991-2001 decade. Decadal growth for Bardhaman district was 14.36 per cent. Decadal growth in West Bengal was 17.84 per cent. Scheduled castes at 35,310 formed around one-third the population. Scheduled tribes numbered 24,819.

Large villages (with 4,000+ population) in Memari II CD Block are (2011 census figures in brackets): Mandalgram (10,171), Barapalashan (6,912), Bijur (5,430), Kuchut (4,598), Jabui (4,066), Begunia (5,962), Satgachhia (8,733) and Bohar (9,057).

=== Literacy ===
As per the 2011 census the total number of literates in Memari II CD Block was 100,455 (74.59% of the population over 6 years) out of which males numbered 55,880 (81.49% of the male population over 6 years) and females numbered 44,575 (67.42% of the female population over 6 years). The gender disparity (the difference between female and male literacy rates) was 14.07%.

As per the 2001 census, Memari II block had a total literacy of 69.89 per cent for the 6+ age group. While male literacy was 79.54 per cent female literacy was 59.77 per cent. Bardhaman district had a total literacy of 70.18 per cent, male literacy being 78.63 per cent and female literacy being 60.95 per cent.

See also – List of West Bengal districts ranked by literacy rate

Literacy in CD blocks of
Bardhaman district
Bardhaman Sadar North subdivision
Ausgram I – 69.39%
Ausgram II – 68.00%
Bhatar – 71.56%
Burdwan I – 76.07%
Burdwan II – 74.12%
Galsi II – 70.05%
Bardhaman Sadar South subdivision
Khandaghosh – 77.28%
Raina I – 80.20%
Raina II – 81.48%
Jamalpur – 74.08%
Memari I – 74.10%
Memari II – 74.59%
Kalna subdivision
Kalna I – 75.81%
Kalna II – 76.25%
Manteswar – 73.08%
Purbasthali I – 77.59%
Purbasthali II – 70.35%
Katwa subdivision
Katwa I – 70.36%
Katwa II – 69.16%
Ketugram I – 68.00%
Ketugram II – 65.96%
Mongalkote – 67.97%
Durgapur subdivision
Andal – 77.25%
Faridpur Durgapur – 74.14%
Galsi I – 72.81%
Kanksa – 76.34%
Pandabeswar – 73.01%
Asansol subdivision
Barabani – 69.58%
Jamuria – 69.42%
Raniganj – 73.86%
Salanpur – 78.76%
2011 Census: CD Block Wise

Primary Census Abstract Data

=== Languages and religion ===
Religion in Memari II CD block (2011)
Hinduism	72.84%
Islam	24.21%
Sarna	2.54%
Other or not stated	0.41%

In the 2011 census Hindus numbered 109,447 and formed 72.84% of the population in Memari iI CD Block. Muslims numbered 36,383 and formed 24.21% of the population. Christians numbered 275 and formed 0.18% of the population. Others numbered 4,147 and formed 2.76% of the population.

In Bardhaman district the percentage of Hindu population has been declining from 84.3% in 1961 to 77.9% in 2011 and the percentage of Muslim population has increased from 15.2% in 1961 to 20.7% in 2011.

Languages of Memari II CD block (2011)
1. Bengali (83.5%)
2. Santali (15.6%)
3. Others (0.97%)

At the time of the 2011 census, 83.46% of the population spoke Bengali and 15.57% Santali as their first language.

== Rural poverty ==
As per poverty estimates obtained from household survey for families living below poverty line in 2005, rural poverty in Memari II CD Block was 38.04%.

== Economy ==
=== Livelihood ===
In Memari II CD Block in 2011, amongst the class of total workers, cultivators formed 17.10%, agricultural labourers 58.54%, household industry workers 2.11% and other workers 22.25%.

Memari II CD Block is part of the area where agriculture dominates the scenario but the secondary and tertiary sectors have shown an increasing trend.

=== Infrastructure ===
There are 88 inhabited villages in Memari II CD block. All 88 villages (100%) have power supply. 86 villages (97.93%) have drinking water supply. 16 villages (18.18%) have post offices. All 88 villages (100%) have telephones (including landlines, public call offices and mobile phones). 42 villages (47.73%) have a pucca (paved) approach road and 54 villages (61.36%) have transport communication (includes bus service, rail facility and navigable waterways). 26 villages (29.55%) have agricultural credit societies. 7 villages (7.95%) have banks.

In 2013-14, there were 96 fertiliser depots, 10 seed stores and 42 fair price shops in the CD Block.

=== Agriculture ===
Persons engaged in agriculture
in Memari II CD Block
1. Bargadars (17.4%)
2. Patta holders (6.55%)
3. Small farmers (3.40%)
4. Marginal farmers (15.2%)
5. Agricultural labourers (57.5%)

Although the Bargadari Act of 1950 recognised the rights of bargadars to a higher share of crops from the land that they tilled, it was not implemented fully. Large tracts, beyond the prescribed limit of land ceiling, remained with the rich landlords. From 1977 onwards major land reforms took place in West Bengal. Land in excess of land ceiling was acquired and distributed amongst the peasants. Following land reforms land ownership pattern has undergone transformation. In 2013-14, persons engaged in agriculture Memari I could be classified as follows: bargadars 17.41%, patta (document) holders 6.55%, small farmers (possessing land between 1 and 2 hectares) 3.40%, marginal farmers (possessing land up to 1 hectare) 15.18% and agricultural labourers 57.46%.

In 2003-04 net cropped area in Memari II CD Block was 14,508 hectares and the area in which more than one crop was grown was 11,820 hectares.

In 2013-14, Memari II CD Block produced 97,129 tonnes of Aman paddy, the main winter crop, from 30,826 hectares, 6,382 tonnes of Aus paddy (summer crop) from 2,343 hectares, 33,269 tonnes of Boro paddy (spring crop) from 7,464 hectares and 58,809 tonnes of potatoes from 2,700 hectares. It also produced pulses and oilseeds.

In Bardhaman district as a whole Aman paddy constituted 64.32% of the total area under paddy cultivation, while the area under Boro and Aus paddy constituted 32.87% and 2.81% respectively. The expansion of Boro paddy cultivation, with higher yield rates, was the result of expansion of irrigation system and intensive cropping. In 2013-14, the total area irrigated in Memari II CD Block was 17,276.64 hectares, out of which 16,154.27 hectares were irrigated by canal water, 241.24 hectares by river lift irrigation and 881.13 hectares by deep tube wells.

=== Banking ===
In 2013-14, Memari II CD Block had offices of 9 commercial banks and 3 gramin banks.

== Transport ==
Memari II CD Block has 8 originating/ terminating bus routes.

SH 15 running from Dainhat (in Bardhaman district) to Gadiara (in Howrah district) passes through this CD Block.

== Education ==
In 2013-14, Memari II CD Block had 113 primary schools with 8,103 students, 4 middle schools with 584 students, 16 high schools with 8,455 students and 6 higher secondary schools with 7,223 students. Memari II CD Block had 254 institutions for special and non-formal education with 6,773 students

As per the 2011 census, in Memari II CD block, amongst the 88 inhabited villages, 7 villages did not have schools, 26 villages had two or more primary schools, 28 villages had at least 1 primary and 1 middle school and 21 villages had at least 1 middle and 1 secondary school.

More than 6,000 schools (in erstwhile Bardhaman district) serve cooked midday meal to more than 900,000 students.

== Healthcare ==
In 2014, Memari II CD Block had 1 block primary health centre and 3 primary health centres with total 32 beds and 5 doctors (excluding private bodies). It had 21 family welfare subcentres. 2,217 patients were treated indoor and 201,770 patients were treated outdoor in the hospitals, health centres and subcentres of the CD Block.

Paharhati Rural Hospital at Paharhati (with 30 beds) is the main medical facility in Memari II CD block. There are primary health centres at Barapalasan (with 6 beds), Bitra (with 10 beds) and Bohar (with 6 beds).

Memari II CD Block is one of the areas of Bardhaman district which is affected by a low level of arsenic contamination of ground water.
