= Nabagram railway station =

Railway station in West Bengal, India

Nabagram
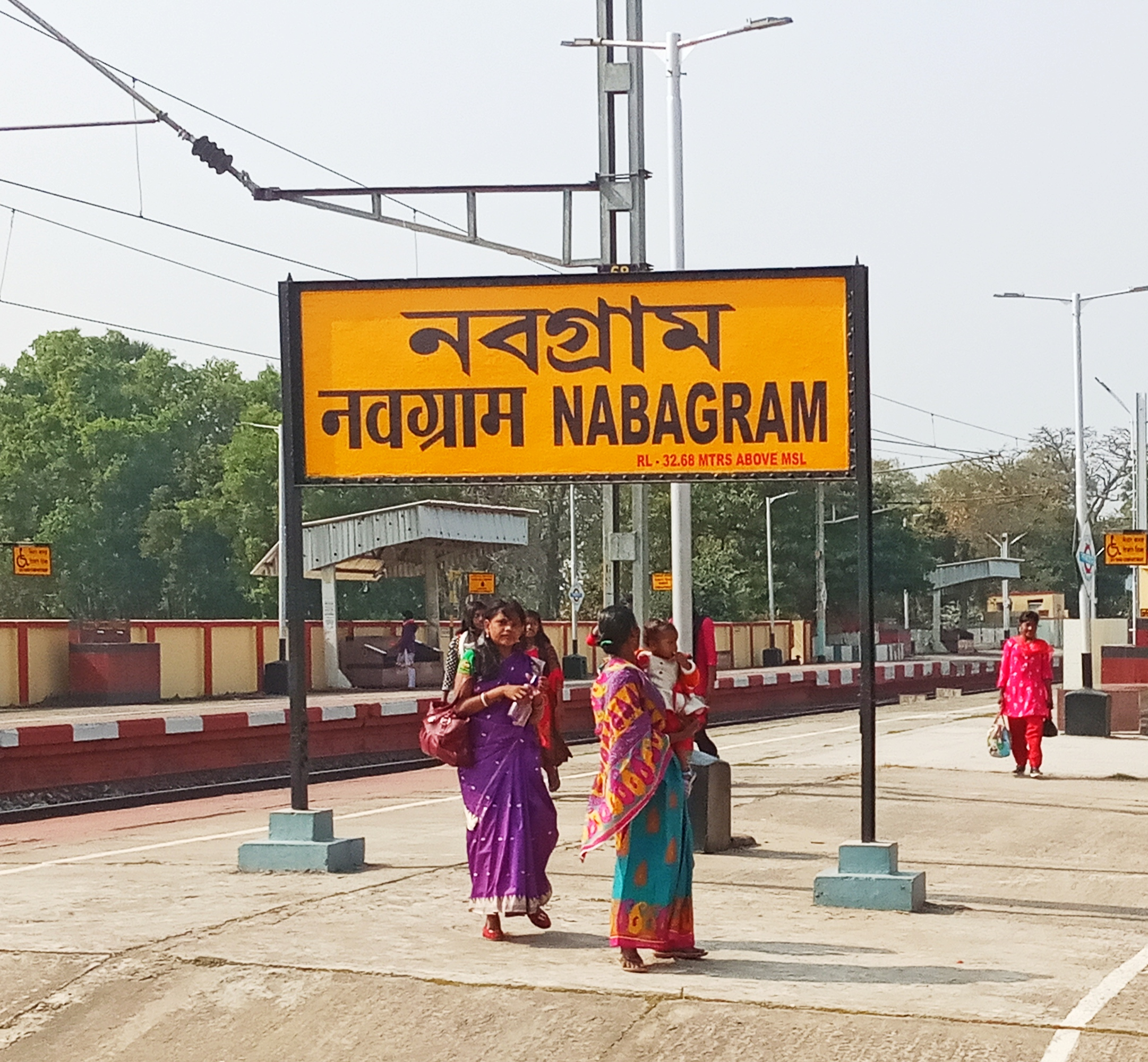
- Nabagram railway station

General information
- Location: Nabagram-Verili Road, Dattapur, Purba Bardhaman district, West Bengal; India
- Coordinates: 23°06′43″N 88°03′26″E
- Elevation: 22 metres (72 ft)
- System: Kolkata Suburban Railway
- Owner: Indian Railways
- Operator: Eastern Railway
- Line: Howrah–Bardhaman chord
- Platforms: 3
- Tracks: 3

Construction
- Structure type: Standard (on ground station)
- Parking: No

Other information
- Status: Functioning
- Station code: NBAE
- Division(s): Howrah

History
- Opened: 1917
- Electrified: 1964
- Former names: East Indian Railway Company

Services
Preceding station	Kolkata Suburban Railway	Following station
Jaugram towards Howrah Junction	Eastern Line Howrah–Bardhaman chord	Chanchai towards Barddhaman Junction
Route map
Location
- Location within West Bengal Location within India

Nabagram railway station is a Kolkata Suburban Railway station on the Howrah–Bardhaman chord line operated by Eastern Railway zone of Indian Railways. It is situated beside Nabagram-Moyna-Verili Road at Dattapur in Purba Bardhaman district in the Indian state of West Bengal.

== History ==
The Howrah–Bardhaman chord, the 95 kilometers railway line was constructed in 1917. It was connected with Sealdah through Dankuni after construction of Vivekananda Setu in 1932. Howrah to Bardhaman chord line including Nabagram railway station was electrified in 1964–66.
