= Paharhati =

Paharhati Parhati
- Village
- Location in West Bengal, India Paharhati (India)
- Coordinates: 23°14′35.0″N 88°5′57.0″E
- Country: India
- State: West Bengal
- District: Purba Bardhaman
- Established: 1934
- Founder: GOLAPMANI DASI
- Named for: Golapmani Dasi

Government
  - Type: Government

Area PGMHS
  - Total: 1 km^{2} (0.39 sq mi)

Population (2026)
  - Total: 1,600
  - Density: 1,600/km^{2} (4,100/sq mi)

Languages
  - Official: Bengali, English
- Time zone: UTC+5:30 (IST)
- PIN: 713146 (Paharhati)
- Telephone/STD code: 0342
- Website: purbabardhaman.gov.in

Paharhati is a village in Memari II CD block in Bardhaman Sadar South subdivision of Purba Bardhaman district in the Indian state of West Bengal.

== Geography ==
Cities and towns in the Bardhaman Sadar South subdivision of Purba Bardhaman district
M: municipal city/ town, CT: census town, R: rural/ urban centre, H: historical/ religious centre
Owing to space constraints in the small map, the actual locations in a larger map may vary slightly

=== Location ===
Paharhati is approximately 25 km from Bardhaman and is 2 hours journey from Howrah/Kolkata. It is also near such towns as Hatgobindopur, Satgachia and Memari, which are 15 minutes distance by private bus or jeep, locally known as trekkers.

=== Urbanisation ===
95.54% of the population of Bardhaman Sadar South subdivision live in the rural areas. Only 4.46% of the population live in the urban areas, and that is the lowest proportion of urban population amongst the four subdivisions in Purba Bardhaman district. The map alongside presents some of the notable locations in the subdivision. All places marked in the map are linked in the larger full screen map.

=== CD block HQ ===
The headquarters of Memari II CD block are located at Pahahati.

== Demographics ==
As per the 2011 Census of India Parhati had a total population of 1,950, of which 987 (51%) were males and 963 (49%) were females. Population below 6 years was 171. The total number of literates in Parhati was 1,302 (73.19% of the population over 6 years).

== Education ==
Paharhati Golapmani High School serves the area. For Graduation and Post Graduation student go to Bardhaman city. The school is started in 1934.The name of the school Head Master is Dr. Janardhan Chatterjee.(M.Sc, B.T., P.Hd).

Paharhati Gopalmani High School, a boys only high school, and Paharhati Baburam Girls’ High School, are affiliated with the West Bengal Board of Secondary Education. Paharhati Gopalmani Higher Secondary School, a coeducational institution, is affiliated with West Bengal Council of Higher Secondary Education for higher secondary classes.

== Healthcare ==
Paharhati Rural Hospital at Paharhati (with 30 beds) is the main medical facility in Memari II CD block. There are primary health centres at Barapalasan (with 6 beds), Bitra (with 10 beds) and Bohar (with 6 beds). The Government Health Centre here in town consists of about 5 specialist doctors along with 10-15 staff of nurses and compounders. One can approach Memari (10 km), Bardhaman (25 km) and Kolkata (82 km) for better health services.

See also - Healthcare in West Bengal
