= Alipur, Purba Bardhaman =

Alipur
- Census Town
- Location in West Bengal, India Alipur (India)
- Coordinates: 23.1434°N 88.1507°E
- Country: India
- State: West Bengal
- District: Purba Bardhaman

Area
  - Total: 1.84 km^{2} (0.71 sq mi)

Population (2011)
  - Total: 4,420
  - Density: 2,400/km^{2} (6,220/sq mi)

Languages
  - Official: Bengali, English
- Time zone: UTC+5:30 (IST)
- Vehicle registration: WB
- Lok Sabha constituency: Bardhaman Purba
- Vidhan Sabha constituency: Memari
- Website: purbabardhaman.gov.in

Alipur is a census town in Memari I CD Block in Bardhaman Sadar South subdivision of Purba Bardhaman district in the Indian state of West Bengal.

== Geography ==
Cities and towns in the Bardhaman Sadar South subdivision of Purba Bardhaman district
M: municipal city/ town, CT: census town, R: rural/ urban centre, H: historical/ religious centre.
Owing to space constraints in the small map, the actual locations in a larger map may vary slightly

=== Location ===
Alipur is located at 23.1434°N 88.1507°E.

Alipur is also shown in the map of Memari I CD block in the District Census Handbook.

=== Urbanisation ===
95.54% of the population of Bardhaman Sadar South subdivision live in the rural areas. Only 4.46% of the population live in the urban areas, and that is the lowest proportion of urban population amongst the four subdivisions in Purba Bardhaman district. The map alongside presents some of the notable locations in the subdivision. All places marked in the map are linked in the larger full screen map.

== Demographics ==
As per the 2011 Census of India, Alipur had a total population of 4,420 of which 2,247 (51%) were males and 2,173 (49%) were females. Population below 6 years was 404. The total number of literates in Alipur was 3,285 (81.80% of the population over 6 years).

== Infrastructure ==
As per the District Census Handbook 2011, Alipur covered an area of 1.8361 km^{2}. Amongst the medical facilities, the nearest nursing home was 12 km away and the nearest veterinary hospital was 9 km away. It had 7 medicine shops. It had 2 primary schools. The nearest middle school was 2 km away at Mobarakpur and the secondary and senior secondary schools were 8 km away at Memari.

== Transport ==
Alipur is off State Highway 13. Debipur railway station is located nearby.
