= Seharabazar =

- Census Town
- Location in West Bengal, India Seharabazar (India)
- Coordinates: 23°06′56.2″N 87°48′18.4″E
- Country: India
- State: West Bengal
- District: Purba Bardhaman

Area
  - Total: 5.69 km^{2} (2.20 sq mi)
- Elevation: 25 m (82 ft)

Population (2011)
  - Total: 7,858
  - Density: 1,380/km^{2} (3,580/sq mi)

Languages
  - Official: Bengali, English
- Time zone: UTC+5:30 (IST)
- Vehicle registration: WB
- Sex ratio: 712 ♂/♀
- Website: purbabardhaman.gov.in

Seharabazar is a census town in Raina I CD Block in Bardhaman Sadar South subdivision of Purba Bardhaman district in the Indian state of West Bengal.

== Geography ==
Cities and towns in the Bardhaman Sadar South subdivision of Purba Bardhaman district
M: municipal city/ town, CT: census town, R: rural/ urban centre, H: historical/ religious centre.
Owing to space constraints in the small map, the actual locations in a larger map may vary slightly

=== Urbanisation ===
95.54% of the population of Bardhaman Sadar South subdivision live in the rural areas. Only 4.46% of the population live in the urban areas, and that is the lowest proportion of urban population amongst the four subdivisions in Purba Bardhaman district. The map alongside presents some of the notable locations in the subdivision. All places marked in the map are linked in the larger full screen map.

=== Location ===
Seharabazar is located at 23°06′56.2″N 87°48′18.4″E

== Demographics ==
As per the 2011 Census of India Sehara had a total population of 7,858, of which 3,996 (51%) were males and 3,862 (49%) were females. Population below 6 years was 752. The total number of literates in Sehara was 5,679 (79.92% of the population over 6 years).

== Infrastructure ==
As per the District Census Handbook 2011, Seharabazar covered an area of 5.6898 km^{2}. It had 5 primary schools, 2 middle schools, 2 secondary schools and 1 senior secondary school. The nearest degree college was 19 km away at Shyamsundar.

== Education ==
Seharabazar Chandra Kumar Institution was established in 1946. It has about 1,500 students. It is a coeducational institution affiliated with the West Bengal Council of Higher Secondary Education.

Seharabazar Radharani Balika Vidyalaya is affiliated with the West Bengal Board of Secondary Education. It is also affiliated with West Bengal Council of Higher Secondary Education.

== Transport ==
Seharabzar railway station is situated, 87.2 km from Bankura, is a station on the Bankura-Masagram line (formerly Bankura Damodar Railway) of South Eastern Railway. As of September 2016, DEMU services were available between Bankura and Mathnasipur. As of January 2019, DEMU services are available between Bankura and Masagram.

The State Highway 7 (West Bengal), running from Rajgram (in Murshidabad district) to Midnapore (in (Paschim Medinipur district), passes through Seharabazar.
