= Memari I =

- Community development block
- Location in West Bengal
- Coordinates: 23°10′34″N 88°06′25″E
- Country: India
- State: West Bengal
- District: Purba Bardhaman
- Parliamentary constituency: Bardhaman Purba
- Assembly constituency: Memari

Area
  - Total: 72.17 sq mi (186.91 km^{2})
- Elevation: 72 ft (22 m)

Population (2011)
  - Total: 218,425
  - Density: 3,026.7/sq mi (1,168.6/km^{2})
- Time zone: UTC+5.30 (IST)
- PIN: 713146 (Memari); 713201 (Durgapur); 713154 (Amadpur)
- Telephone/STD code: 03213
- Vehicle registration: WB-37,WB-38,WB-41,WB-42,WB-44
- Literacy Rate: 74.10 per cent
- Website: http://purbabardhaman.gov.in/

Memari I is a community development block that forms an administrative division in Bardhaman Sadar South subdivision of Purba Bardhaman district in the Indian state of West Bengal.

== Geography ==
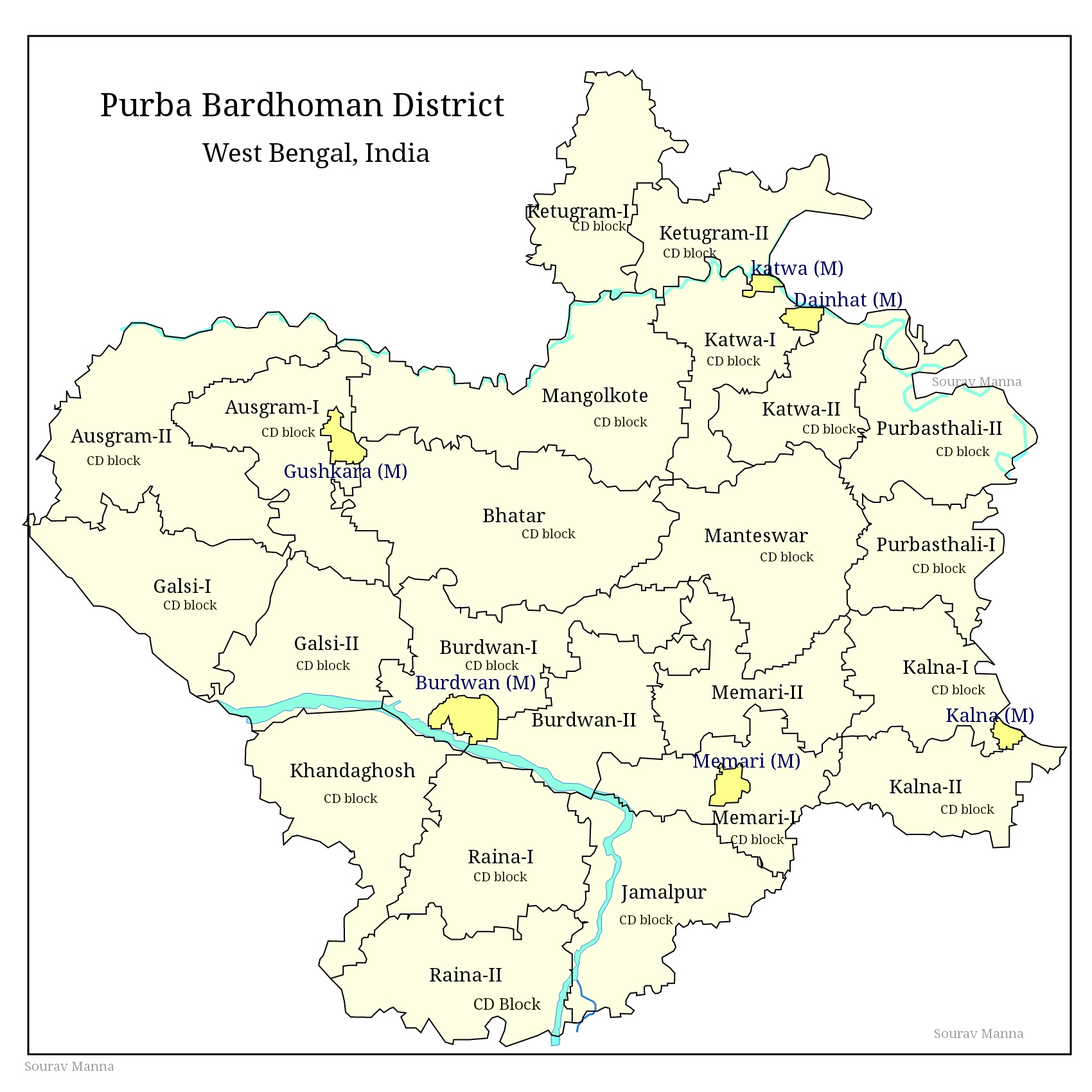
CD blocks of Purba Bardhaman district

=== Location ===
Memari is located at 23°10′34″N 88°06′25″E.

Memari I CD Block is part of the Bardhaman Plain, the central plain area of the district. The area is surrounded by the Bhagirathi on the east, the Ajay on the north-west and the Damodar on the west and south. Old river channels and small creeks found in the region dry up in the dry season, but the Bardhaman Plains are sometimes subject to heavy floods during the rainy season. The region has recent alluvial soils.

Memari I CD Block is bounded by Memari II CD Block on the north, Kalna II CD Block and Pandua CD Block, in Hooghly district, on the east, Jamalpur CD Block on the south and Burdwan II CD Block on the west.

Memari I CD Block has an area of 186.91 km^{2}. It has 1 panchayat samity, 10 gram panchayats, 171 gram sansads (village councils), 113 mouzas and 111 inhabited villages. Memari police station serves this block. Headquarters of this CD Block is at Memari.

Gram panchayats of Memari I block/panchayat samiti are: Amadpur, Bagila, Daluibazar I, Daluibazar II, Debipur, Durgapur, Gope-Gantar I, Gope-Gantar II, Nimo I and Nimo II.

== Demographics ==
=== Population ===
As per the 2011 Census of India Memari I CD Block had a total population of 218,425, of which 214,005 were rural and 4,420 were urban. There were 110,712 (51%) males and 107,713 (49%) females. Population below 6 years was 22,294. Scheduled Castes numbered 79,976 (36.61%) and Scheduled Tribes numbered 34,467 (15.78%).

As per 2001 census, Memari I block had a total population of 198,152, out of which 100,715 were males and 97,437 were females. Memari I block registered a population growth of 1.31 per cent during the 1991-2001 decade. Decadal growth for Bardhaman district was 14.36 per cent. Decadal growth in West Bengal was 17.84 per cent. Scheduled castes at 76,357 formed more than one-third the population. Scheduled tribes numbered 28,467.

Census Town in Memari I CD Block is (2011 census figure in brackets): Alipur (4,420).

Large villages (with 4,000+ population) in Memari I CD Block are (2011 census figures in brackets): Palla (6,675), Chanchal (11,476), Amadpur (5,507), Sanui (4,141), Rasulpur (5,091), Kenna (4,116), Nimo (4,710), Chotkhanda (4,365) and Mabarakpur (4,465).

Other villages in Memari I CD Block include (2011census figures in brackets): Durgapur (2,056), Debipur (3,175), Gantar (2,637), Bagila (3,459) and Dalui Bazar (3,714).

=== Literacy ===
As per the 2011 census the total number of literates in Memari I CD Block was 145,341 (74.10% of the population over 6 years) out of which males numbered 80,404 (80.88% of the male population over 6 years) and females numbered 64,937 (67.14% of the female population over 6 years). The gender disparity (the difference between female and male literacy rates) was 13.74%.

As per 2001 census, Memari I block had a total literacy of 66.43 per cent for the 6+ age group. While male literacy was 75.58 per cent female literacy was 56.97 per cent. Bardhaman district had a total literacy of 70.18 per cent, male literacy being 78.63 per cent and female literacy being 60.95 per cent.

See also – List of West Bengal districts ranked by literacy rate

Literacy in CD blocks of
Bardhaman district
Bardhaman Sadar North subdivision
Ausgram I – 69.39%
Ausgram II – 68.00%
Bhatar – 71.56%
Burdwan I – 76.07%
Burdwan II – 74.12%
Galsi II – 70.05%
Bardhaman Sadar South subdivision
Khandaghosh – 77.28%
Raina I – 80.20%
Raina II – 81.48%
Jamalpur – 74.08%
Memari I – 74.10%
Memari II – 74.59%
Kalna subdivision
Kalna I – 75.81%
Kalna II – 76.25%
Manteswar – 73.08%
Purbasthali I – 77.59%
Purbasthali II – 70.35%
Katwa subdivision
Katwa I – 70.36%
Katwa II – 69.16%
Ketugram I – 68.00%
Ketugram II – 65.96%
Mongalkote – 67.97%
Durgapur subdivision
Andal – 77.25%
Faridpur Durgapur – 74.14%
Galsi I – 72.81%
Kanksa – 76.34%
Pandabeswar – 73.01%
Asansol subdivision
Barabani – 69.58%
Jamuria – 69.42%
Raniganj – 73.86%
Salanpur – 78.76%
2011 Census: CD Block Wise

Primary Census Abstract Data

=== Languages and religion ===
Religion in Memari I CD block (2011)
Hinduism	79.03%
Islam	18.26%
Sarna	2.43%
Other or not stated	0.28%

In the 2011 census Hindus numbered 172,616 and formed 79.03% of the population in Memari I CD Block. Muslims numbered 39,882 and formed 18.26% of the population. Christians numbered 360 and formed 0.16% of the population. Others numbered 5,567 and formed 2.55% of the population.

In Bardhaman district the percentage of Hindu population has been declining from 84.3% in 1961 to 77.9% in 2011 and the percentage of Muslim population has increased from 15.2% in 1961 to 20.7% in 2011.

Languages of Memari I CD block (2011)
1. Bengali (86.5%)
2. Santali (11.8%)
3. Hindi (1.00%)
4. Others (0.68%)

At the time of the 2011 census, 86.49% of the population spoke Bengali, 11.83% Santali and 1.00% Hindi as their first language.

== Rural poverty ==
As per poverty estimates obtained from household survey for families living below poverty line in 2005, rural poverty in Memari I CD Block was 28.05%.

== Economy ==
=== Livelihood ===
In Memari I CD Block in 2011, amongst the class of total workers, cultivators formed 11.24%, agricultural labourers 52.16%, household industry workers 5.69% and other workers 30.90%.

Memari I CD Block is part of the area where agriculture dominates the scenario but the secondary and tertiary sectors have shown an increasing trend.

=== Infrastructure ===
There are 111 inhabited villages in Memari I CD block. All 111 villages (100%) have power supply. All 111 villages (100%) have drinking water supply. 17 villages (15.32%) have post offices. All 111 villages (100%) have telephones (including landlines, public call offices and mobile phones). 44 villages (39.64%) have a pucca (paved) approach road and 64 villages (57.66%) have transport communication (includes bus service, rail facility and navigable waterways). 19 villages (17.12%) have agricultural credit societies. 10 villages (9.01%) have banks.

In 2013–14, there were 124 fertiliser depots, 38 seed stores and 59 fair price shops in the CD Block.

=== Agriculture ===
Persons engaged in agriculture
in Memari I CD Block
1. Bargadars (5.79%)
2. Patta holders (10.0%)
3. Small farmers (3.48%)
4. Marginal farmers (24.4%)
5. Agricultural labourers (56.3%)

Although the Bargadari Act of 1950 recognised the rights of bargadars to a higher share of crops from the land that they tilled, it was not implemented fully. Large tracts, beyond the prescribed limit of land ceiling, remained with the rich landlords. From 1977 onwards major land reforms took place in West Bengal. Land in excess of land ceiling was acquired and distributed amongst the peasants. Following land reforms land ownership pattern has undergone transformation. In 2013–14, persons engaged in agriculture in Memari I CD Block could be classified as follows: bargadars 5.79%, patta (document) holders 10.00%, small farmers (possessing land between 1 and 2 hectares) 3.48%, marginal farmers (possessing land up to 1 hectare) 24.43% and agricultural labourers 56.31%.

In 2003-04 net cropped area in Memari I CD Block was 14,068 hectares and the area in which more than one crop was grown was 15,590 hectares.

In 2013–14, Memari I CD Block produced 3,342 tonnes of Aman paddy, the main winter crop, from 1,263 hectares, 6,682 tones of Aus paddy (summer crop) from 2,534 hectares, 13,255 tonnes of Boro paddy (spring crop) from 3,576 hectares, 1,063 tonnes of wheat from 397 hectares, 358,206 tonnes of potatoes from 10,836 hectares and 1,192 tonnes of sugarcane from 19 hectares It also produced pulses and oilseeds.

In Bardhaman district as a whole Aman paddy constituted 64.32% of the total area under paddy cultivation, while the area under Boro and Aus paddy constituted 32.87% and 2.81% respectively. The expansion of Boro paddy cultivation, with higher yield rates, was the result of expansion of irrigation system and intensive cropping. In 2013–14, the total area irrigated in Memari I CD Block was 16,402.60 hectares, out of which 15,946.65 hectares were irrigated by canal water, 129.15 hectares by river lift irrigation and 326.60 hectares by deep tube wells.

=== Banking ===
In 2013–14, Memari I CD Block had offices of 12 commercial banks and 2 gramin banks.

== Transport ==
Memari I CD Block has 26 originating/ terminating bus routes.

The Howrah-Bardhaman main line passes through this CD Block and there are stations at Rasulpur, Nimo, Memari, Bagila and Debipur.

Howrah-Bardhaman chord passes through the CD Block and there is a station at Palla Road.

Kolkata-Delhi NH 19 (old numbering NH 2) passes through this CD Block.

SH 13 running from Mollarpui Maghipara (in Birbhum district) to Dankuni (in Hooghly district), incorporating old Grand Trunk Road in this CD Block, crosses SH 15 running from Dainhat (in Bardhaman district) to Gadiara (in Howrah district).

== Education ==
In 2013–14, Memari I CD Block had 111 primary schools with 9,503 students, 8 middle schools with 660 students, 15 high schools with 8,891 students and 6 higher secondary schools with 7,916 students. Memari I CD Block had 3 technical/ professional institution with 417 students and 392 institutions for special and non-formal education with 13,895 students

As per the 2011 census, in Memari I CD block, amongst the 111 inhabited villages, 8 villages did not have schools, 39 villages had two or more primary schools, 44 villages had at least 1 primary and 1 middle school and 35 villages had at least 1 middle and 1 secondary school.

More than 6,000 schools (in erstwhile Bardhaman district) serve cooked midday meal to more than 900,000 students.

== Culture ==
Sat Deul, a brick-built temple, shows the features of the Nagara style. It is datable to c. 10th-11th century AD. The Amadpur Chaudhuri Zamindar Bari, located in Amadpur, is one of the region's historic zamindar estates. It is known for its centuries-old Durga Puja, traditional rituals, and a heritage homestay operated within part of the estate.

== Healthcare ==
In 2014, Memari I CD Block had 1 rural hospital and 3 primary health centres with total 86 beds and 10 doctors (excluding private bodies). It had 31 family welfare subcentres. 10,027 patients were treated indoor and 389,660 patients were treated outdoor in the hospitals, health centres and subcentres of the CD Block.

Memari Rural Hospital (with 60 beds) is located in Memari municipality. In Memari I CD block there are primary health centres at Debipur (with 10 beds), Durgapur, PO Chotkharda (with 10 beds) and Palla Road (with 10 beds).

Memari I CD Block is one of the areas of Bardhaman district which is affected by a low level of arsenic contamination of ground water.
