= Nabagram, Bardhaman =

Nabagram Shyamsunderbati
- Village
- Location in West Bengal, India Nabagram (India)
- Coordinates: 23.1176110°N 88.0498120°E
- Country: India
- State: West Bengal
- District: Purba Bardhaman

Government
  - Type: Panchayati raj (India)
  - Body: Gram panchayat
- Elevation: 32 m (105 ft)

Languages
  - Official: Bengali, English
- Time zone: UTC+5:30 (IST)
- Postal code: 713166
- ISO 3166 code: IN-WB
- Vehicle registration: WB
- Website: purbabardhaman.gov.in

Nabagram is a village in Ajhapur gram panchayat of Jamalpur CD block in Bardhaman Sadar South subdivision of Purba Bardhaman district in the Indian state of West Bengal.

== Geography ==
Nabagram is located at 23°07′03″N 88°02′59″E.

== Transport ==
Nabagram railway station is 69 kilometres (43 mi) from Howrah station on the Howrah Burdwan chord line. It is 26 km from Bardhaman Junction railway station. The village is beside of NH 2 Durgapur Expressway, so the transportation and the linking with the major cities by road and rail transport is easy to access this village. The streets are quite good for transport. All areas of Nabagram are accessible by cars.

== Economy ==
The main occupation of the large no of peoples are farming but nowadays the quantity jobs for people increases only because of eastern railway chord line local train services.

In this village there are 1 co education 12th std. high school with approx 1,500 students, 1 Junior High School, hospitals, State Bank Of India Bank with ATM, Bandhan Bank, a sub post office, market etc..

== Education ==
Nabagram Moyna Pulin Behari High School is a coeducational high school affiliated with the West Board of Secondary Education. It is also affiliated with West Bengal Council of Higher Secondary Education for higher secondary classes.

== Healthcare ==
There is a Rural primary health centre at Nabagram (with 4 beds).
