= Shyamsundarpur =

Shyamsundarpur Shyam Sunderpur
- Location in Jharkhand, India Shyamsundarpur (India)
- Coordinates: 22.5518°N 86.7643°E
- Country: India
- State: Jharkhand
- District: Purbi Singhbhum

Population (2001)
  - Total: 353

Languages
- Time zone: UTC+5:30 (IST)
- Vehicle registration: JH

Syamsundarpur is a village in Chakulia community development block in East Singhbhum district of Jharkhand, India. Nearby places are Baharagora and Dhalbhumgar.

== Demographics ==
As per 2011 Census of India, Shyam Sunderpur had a total population of 353 of which 185 (52%) were males and 168 (48%) were females. Population below age 6 was 29. The total number of literates in Shyam Sunderpur was 219 (67.59% of the population over age 6 ).

== Sanskrit as a native language ==
Indian newspapers have published reports about Shyamsundarpur village (in Odisha), where a large parts of the population, including children, use Sanskrit as a native language in everyday communication.
