= Sagrai =

- Village
- Location in West Bengal, India Sagrai (India)
- Coordinates: 23°09′10.0″N 87°48′58.0″E
- Country: India
- State: West Bengal
- District: Purba Bardhaman

Population (2011)
  - Total: 1,755

Languages
  - Official: Bengali, English
- Time zone: UTC+5:30 (IST)
- Telephone/STD code: 03451
- Lok Sabha constituency: Bishnupur
- Vidhan Sabha constituency: Khandaghosh
- Website: purbabardhaman.gov.in

Sagrai is a village in Khandaghosh CD block in Bardhaman Sadar South subdivision of Purba Bardhaman district in the state of West Bengal, India.

== Geography ==
Cities and towns in the Bardhaman Sadar South subdivision of Purba Bardhaman district
M: municipal city/ town, CT: census town, R: rural/ urban centre, H: historical/ political centre.
Owing to space constraints in the small map, the actual locations in a larger map may vary slightly

=== Urbanisation ===
95.54% of the population of Bardhaman Sadar South subdivision live in the rural areas. Only 4.46% of the population live in the urban areas, and that is the lowest proportion of urban population amongst the four subdivisions in Purba Bardhaman district. The map alongside presents some of the notable locations in the subdivision. All places marked in the map are linked in the larger full screen map.

=== CD block HQ ===
The headquarters of Khandaghosh CD block are located at Sagrai.

== Demographics ==
As per the 2011 Census of India Sagrai had a total population of 1,755, of which 877 (50%) were males and 878 (50%) were females. Population below 6 years was 155. The total number of literates in Sagrai was 1,385 (86.56% of the population over 6 years).

== Transport ==
The State Highway 7, running from Rajgram (in Murshidabad district) to Midnapore (in Paschim Medinipur district), passes through Sagrai.

== Education ==
Sagrai Sukanta Vidyapith is a Bengali-medium coeducational higher secondary school. Established in 2003, it has facilities for teaching in classes VI to XII.

Primary schools in Sagrai: Ahladipur FP School and Keudia Latifpur FP School.
