= Shyamsundar =

- Village
- Location in West Bengal, India Shyamsundar (India)
- Coordinates: 23°06′16.8″N 87°51′59.0″E
- Country: India
- State: West Bengal
- District: Purba Bardhaman

Population (2011)
  - Total: 4,903

Languages
  - Official: Bengali, English
- Time zone: UTC+5:30 (IST)
- PIN: 713424 (Shyamsundar)
- Telephone/STD code: 03451
- Lok Sabha constituency: Bardhaman Purba
- Vidhan Sabha constituency: Raina
- Website: purbabardhaman.gov.in

Shyamsundar is a village in Raina I CD block in Bardhaman Sadar South subdivision of Purba Bardhaman district in the state of West Bengal, India.

== History ==
Earlier, the village was called ‘Ahar Belma’ and the village was renamed after the deity was established there by Bisalakhya Bose.

== Geography ==
Cities and towns in the Bardhaman Sadar South subdivision of Purba Bardhaman district
M: municipal city/ town, CT: census town, R: rural/ urban centre, H: historical/ religious centre.
Owing to space constraints in the small map, the actual locations in a larger map may vary slightly

=== Location ===
Shyamsundar is located at 23°06′16.8″N 87°51′59.0″E.

It is 18 km from Bardhaman.

=== Urbanisation ===
95.54% of the population of Bardhaman Sadar South subdivision live in the rural areas. Only 4.46% of the population live in the urban areas, and that is the lowest proportion of urban population amongst the four subdivisions in Purba Bardhaman district. The map alongside presents some of the notable locations in the subdivision. All places marked in the map are linked in the larger full screen map.

=== CD block HQ ===
The headquarters of Raina I CD block are located at Shyamsundar.

== Demographics ==
As per the 2011 Census of India Shyamsundar had a total population of 4,903, of which 2,469 (50%) were males and 2,434 (50%) were females. Population below 6 years was 446. The total number of literates in Shyamsundar was 3,707 (83.17% of the population over 6 years).

== Transport ==
There is Shymsundar railway station on the Bankura-Masagram line. As of 3 November 2021, MEMU services are available between Bankura and Masagram.

== Education ==
In 1947, at the time of independence there were only three colleges in Bardhaman district – at Bardhaman, Kalna and Asansol. Shyamsundar College was established in 1948. Syamsundar College was founded by Raibahadur Bisalaksha Bose, a social worker of Shyamsundar. Amongst those who helped in establishing the college were: Abdus Sattar, Kalipada Mukherjee, Prafulla Chandra Sen and Jadabendra Nath Panja. Subjects taught in the college include: physics, chemistry, mathematics, botany, zoology, microbiology, Bengali, English, Sanskrit, history, geography, political science, education, philosophy, economics and commerce.

Shyamsundar Ramlal Adarsha Vidyalaya, a boys only high school, and Adarsha Balika Vidyalaya, a girls only high school, are affiliated with the West Bengal Board of Secondary Education. Shymsundar Ramlal Adarsha Vidyalaya, a coeducational institution, is affiliated with West Bengal Council of Higher Secondary Education.

== Healthcare ==
There is a primary health centre at Shyamsundar (with 10 beds).
