= Memari =

- Town
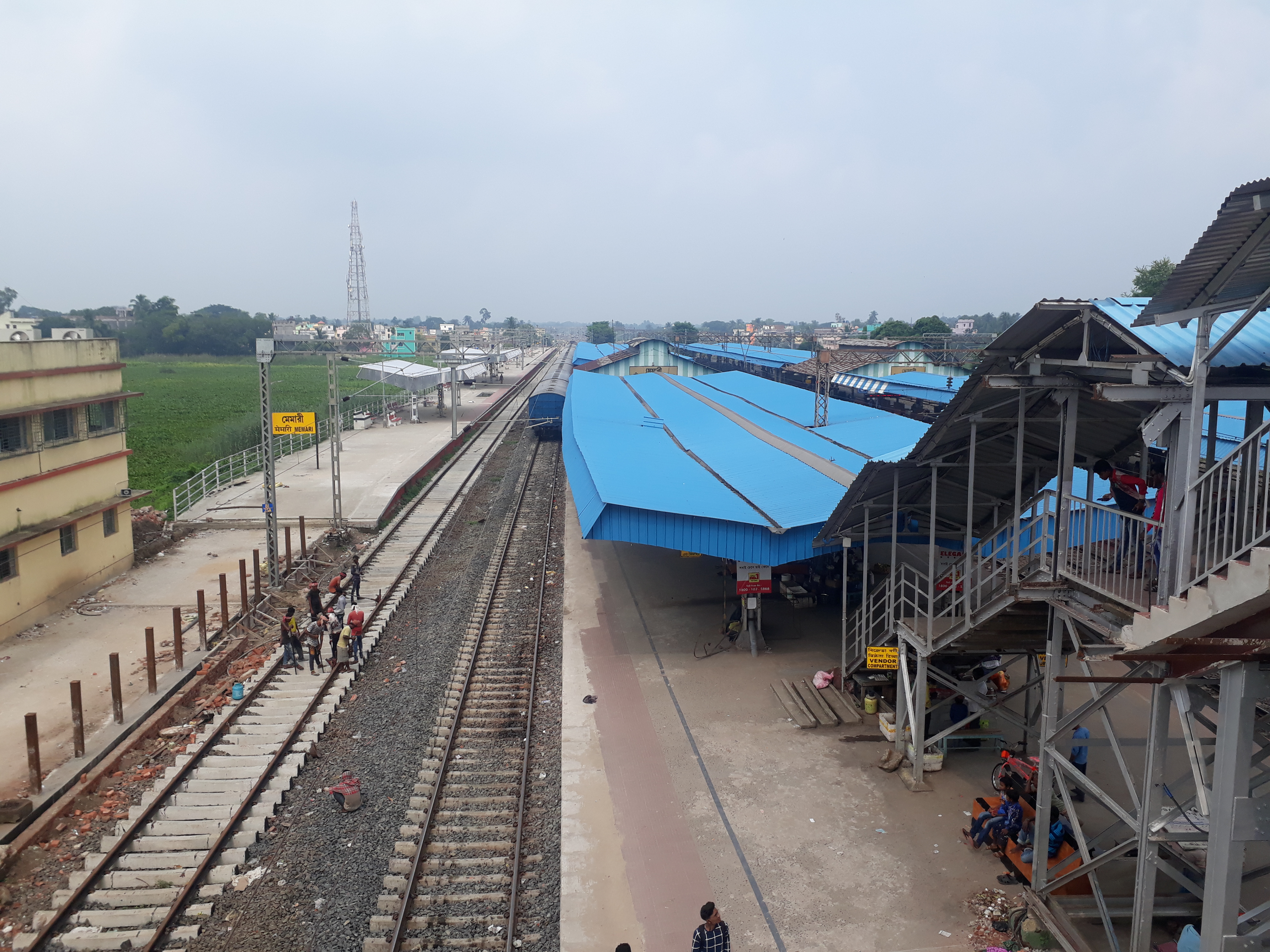
- Memari railway station

- Location in West Bengal, India Memari (India)
- Coordinates: 23.2°N 88.12°E
- Country: India
- State: West Bengal
- District: Purba Bardhaman

Government
  - Type: Municipality
  - Body: Memari Municipality

Area
  - Total: 14.68 km^{2} (5.67 sq mi)
- Elevation: 25 m (82 ft)

Population (2011)
  - Total: 41,451
  - Density: 2,824/km^{2} (7,313/sq mi)

Languages
  - Official: Bengali, Hindi, English
- Time zone: UTC+5:30 (IST)
- PIN: 713146
- Lok Sabha constituency: Bardhaman Purba
- Vidhan Sabha constituency: Memari
- Website: purbabardhaman.gov.in

Memari is a town and a municipality in Purba Bardhaman district in the Indian state of West Bengal.

== Geography ==
Cities and towns in the Bardhaman Sadar South subdivision of Purba Bardhaman district
M: municipal city/ town, CT: census town, R: rural/ urban centre, H: historical/ religious centre.
Owing to space constraints in the small map, the actual locations in a larger map may vary slightly

=== Location ===
Memari is located at 23.2°N 88.12°E. It has an average elevation of 25 metres (82 feet).

=== Urbanisation ===
95.54% of the population of Bardhaman Sadar South subdivision live in the rural areas. Only 4.46% of the population live in the urban areas, and that is the lowest proportion of urban population amongst the four subdivisions in Purba Bardhaman district. The map alongside presents some of the notable locations in the subdivision. All places marked in the map are linked in the larger full screen map.

=== Police station ===
Memari police station has jurisdiction over Memari municipal area, and Memari I and Memari II CD blocks. The area covered is 429.36 km^{2}.

== Demographics ==
As per the 2011 Census of India Memari had a total population of 41,451, of which 20,957 (51%) were males and 20,494 (49%) were females. Population below 6 years was 3,809.

As of 2001 India census, Memari had a population of 36,191. Males constitute 52% of the population and females 48%. Memari has an average literacy rate of 69%, higher than the national average of 59.5%: male literacy is 75%, and female literacy is 63%. In Memari, 11% of the population is under 6 years of age.

== Education ==
- Memari College was established at Memari in 1981.
- Memari Government Polytechnic was established at Memari in 2017.

Memari has thirteen primary, and six higher secondary schools. Memari Vidyasagar memorial Institution (unit-1) & (unit-2) are the higher secondary schools, established in 1892. Memari Rasiklal Smriti Balika Vidyalaya school for girls. Memari al-amin Mission, Memari High Madrassa, Memari Jamiya Islamiya are the three major high schools.

== Transport ==
- Memari railway station is situated on the Howrah-Bardhaman main line about 82 kilometres (51 mi) from Howrah Station and 25 kilometres (16 mi) from Bardhaman station.
- SH 13/ GT Road, SH 15 passes through Memari.
- Many Express, Local buses are available from Memari. Buses bound for Asansol, Bardhaman, Chuchura, Durgapur, Krishnanagar, Katwa, Nabadwip, Tarakeswar, Salar are available.
