= Khandaghosh =

- Village
- Location in West Bengal, India Khandaghosh (India)
- Coordinates: 23°12′56.4″N 87°41′23.0″E
- Country: India
- State: West Bengal
- District: Purba Bardhaman

Population (2011)
  - Total: 7,717

Languages
  - Official: Bengali, English
- Time zone: UTC+5:30 (IST)
- PIN: 713142 (Khandaghosh)
- Telephone/STD code: 03451
- Lok Sabha constituency: Bishnupur
- Vidhan Sabha constituency: Khandaghosh
- Website: purbabardhaman.gov.in

Khandaghosh is a village in Khandaghosh CD block in Bardhaman Sadar South subdivision of Purba Bardhaman district in the state of West Bengal, India.

== Demographics ==
As per the 2011 Census of India Khandaghosh had a total population of 7,717, of which 3,198 (52%) were males and 3,799 (48%) were females. Population below 6 years was 794. The total number of literates in Khandaghosh was 4,736 (68.41% of the population over 6 years).

== Geography ==
Cities and towns in the Bardhaman Sadar South subdivision of Purba Bardhaman district
M: municipal city/ town, CT: census town, R: rural/ urban centre, H: historical/ political centre.
Owing to space constraints in the small map, the actual locations in a larger map may vary slightly

=== Urbanisation ===
95.54% of the population of Bardhaman Sadar South subdivision live in the rural areas. Only 4.46% of the population live in the urban areas, and that is the lowest proportion of urban population amongst the four subdivisions in Purba Bardhaman district. The map alongside presents some of the notable locations in the subdivision. All places marked in the map are linked in the larger full screen map.

=== Police station ===
Khandaghosh police station has jurisdiction over Khandaghosh CD Block. The area covered is 256.13 km^{2}.

== Healthcare ==
Khandaghosh block primary health centre at Khandaghosh (with 15 beds) is the main medical facility in Khandaghosh CD block. There are primary health centres at Khudkuri, PO Sankari (with 4 beds), Kuley (Gayeshpur), PO Chagram (with 10 beds) and Torkona (with 4 beds). In 2012, the average monthly patients attending Khandaghosh BPHC were 8,094 and average monthly admissions were 51. It handled 454 annual emergency admissions.

== Education ==
Khandaghosh High School is a coeducational high school affiliated with the West Bengal Board of Secondary Education.

== Transport ==
The State Highway 8 running from Santaldih (in Purulia district) to Majhdia (in Nadia district) passes through Khandaghosh. The road is locally known as Bardhaman-Bankura Road.
