= Bardhaman Sadar South subdivision =

- Subdivision
- Interactive map of Bardhaman Sadar South subdivision
- Coordinates: 23.20°N 88.12°E
- Country: India
- State: West Bengal
- District: Purba Bardhaman
- Headquarters: Memari

Area
  - Total: 1,410.03 km^{2} (544.42 sq mi)

Population
  - Total: 1,198,155
  - Density: 849.737/km^{2} (2,200.81/sq mi)

Languages
  - Official: Bengali, English
- Time zone: UTC+5:30 (IST)
- ISO 3166 code: ISO 3166-2:IN
- Website: http://bardhaman.gov.in/

Bardhaman Sadar South subdivision is an administrative subdivision of the Purba Bardhaman district in the state of West Bengal, India. Great revolutionary Rash Behari Bose was born in village Subaldaha. This village is under this subdivision.

== Overview ==
Bardhaman Sadar South subdivision is spread over partly across the Bardhaman Plain in the central part of the district and partly across Khandaghosh Plain in the south-eastern part of the district.

== Subdivisions ==
Purba Bardhaman district is divided into the following administrative subdivisions:

Subdivision	Headquarters	Area km^{2}	Population (2011)	Rural population % (2011)	Urban population % (2011)
Bardhaman Sadar North	Bardhaman	1,958.43	1,586,623	73.58	26.42
Bardhaman Sadar South	Memari	1,410.03	1,198,155	95.54	4.46
Katwa	Katwa	1,070.48	963,022	88.44	11.56
Kalna	Kalna	993.75	1,087,732	87.00	13.00
Purba Bardhaman district	Bardhaman	5,432.69	4,835,532	84.98	15.02

== Administrative units ==
Cities and towns in the Bardhaman Sadar South subdivision of Purba Bardhaman district
M: municipal city/ town, CT: census town, R: rural/ urban centre, H: historical/ religious centre.
Owing to space constraints in the small map, the actual locations in a larger map may vary slightly

Bardhaman Sadar South subdivision has 5 police stations, 6 community development blocks, 6 panchayat samitis, 58 gram panchayats, 643 mouzas, 624 inhabited villages, 1 municipality and 2 census towns. The single municipality is at Memari. The census towns are: Alipur and Seharabazar. The subdivision has its headquarters at Memari.

== Demographics ==
As per the 2011 Census of India data Bardhaman Sadar South subdivision, after bifurcation of Bardhaman district in 2017, had a total population of 1,198,155. There were 609,720 (51%) males and 588,435 (49%) females. Population below 6 years was 124,639.

As per the 2011 census data the total number of literates in Bardhaman Sadar South subdivision, after bifurcation of Bardhaman district in 2017, was 825,408 (76.89% of the population over 6 years) out of which males numbered 455,002 (83.29% of the male population over 6 years) and females numbered 370,406 (70.13% of the female population over 6 years).

See also – List of West Bengal districts ranked by literacy rate

Religion in Bardhaman Sadar South subdivision
Hindu	75.87%
Muslim	22.51%
Christian	0.11%
Others	1.50%

In the 2011 census Hindus numbered 909,092 and formed 75.87% of the population in Bardhaman Sadar South subdivision. Muslims numbered 269,759 and formed 22.51% of the population. Christians numbered 1,278 and formed 0.11% of the population. Others numbered 18,026 and formed 1.50% of the population.

== Police stations ==
Police stations in Bardhaman Sadar South subdivision have the following features and jurisdiction:

Police station	Area covered km^{2}	Municipal town	CD Block
Memari	429.36	Memari	Memari I, Memari II
Jamalpur	267.89	-	Jamalpur
Raina	266.43	-	Raina I
Madhabdihi	225.5	-	Raina II
Khandaghosh	256.13	-	Khandaghosh

== Blocks ==
Community development blocks in Bardhaman Sadar South subdivision are:

CD Block	Headquarters	Area km^{2}	Population (2011)	SC %	ST %	Hindus %	Muslims %	Literacy rate %	Census Towns
Memari I	Memari	186.91	218,425	36.61	15.78	79.03	18.26	74.10	1
Memari II	Paharhati	186.64	150,252	23.92	18.42	72.84	24.21	74.59	-
Jamalpur	Jamalpur	263.02	266,338	36.08	15.18	80.88	16.85	74.08	-
Raina I	Shyamsundar	266.07	180,952	34.35	5.80	70.72	28.43	80.20	1
Raina II	Madhabdihi	227.28	151,401	40.73	4.00	82.84	16.88	81.48	-
Khandaghosh	Sagrai	265.23	189,336	38.81	2.29	67.17	32.47	77.28	-

== Gram panchayats ==
The subdivision contains 58 gram panchayats under 6 community development blocks:

- Khandaghosh block consists of ten gram panchayats, viz. Berugram, Khandaghosh, Shankari–I, Ukhrid, Gopalbera, Lodna, Shankari–II, Kaiyar, Sagrai and Sasanga.
- Jamalpur block consists of 13 gram panchayats, viz. Abujhati–I, Chakdighi, Jarogram, Paratal–II, Abujhati–II, Jamalpur–I, Jyotsreeram, Ajhapur, Jamalpur–II, Panchrah, Berugram, Jaugram, Paratal–I.
- Memari–I block consists of ten gram panchayats, viz. Amadpur, Daluibazar–II, Gop–Gantar–I, Nimo–II, Bagila, Debipur, Gop–Gantar–II, Daluibazar–I, Durgapur and Nimo–I.
- Memari–II block consists of nine gram panchayats, viz. Bara Palasan–I, Bijur–II, Kuchut, Bara Palasan–II, Bohar–I, Satgachhia–I, Bijur–I, Bohar–II, Satgachhia–II.
- Raina–I block consists of eight gram panchayats, viz. Hijalna, Narugram, Palsona, Sehara, Mugura, Natu, Raina and Shyamsundar.
- Raina–II block consists of eight gram panchayats, viz. Arui, Gotan, Pahalanpur, Painta–II, Barabainan, Kaiti, Painta–I and Uchalan.

== Economy ==
=== Agriculture ===
In the erstwhile Bardhaman district agriculture was the pre-dominant economic activity and the main source of livelihood for the rural people. The soil and climate favours the production of food grains. Cash crops are also grown. Irrigation facilities had contributed in a major way towards higher agricultural productivity. Amongst the districts of West Bengal, Bardhaman district had maximum irrigated land under cultivation. Given below is an overview of the agricultural production (all data in tonnes) for Bardhaman Sadar North subdivision, other subdivisions and the Purba Bardhaman district, after bifurcation of the erstwhile Bardhaman district, with data for the year 2013–14.

CD Block/ Subdivision	Rice	Wheat	Jute	Pulses	Oil seeds	Potatoes	Sugarcane
Memari I	23,279	1,063	-	-	3,610	358,206	1,192
Memari II	136,760	-	-	4	71	58,809	-
Jamalpur	17,136	-	33	-	4,177	317,928	-
Raina I	155,987	541	-	439	2,345	22,841	-
Raina II	21,404	25	-	501	3,116	81,509	-
Khandaghosh	87,079	129	-	431	1,300	44,164	-
Bardhaman Sadar South	441,645	1,758	33	1,375	14,619	883,457	1,192
Bardhaman Sadar North	688,626	908	-	108	3,059	105,182	1,802
Katwa	509,610	638	65,168	217	7,432	51,928	97,483
Kalna	257,149	3,461	179,375	164	11,425	159,659	565
Purba Bardhaman district	1,897,030	6,765	244,576	1,864	36,535	1,200,226	101,042

== Education ==
Statistics in the table below give a comprehensive picture of the education scenario in Purba Bardhaman district, after bifurcation of Bardhaman district in 2017, with data for the year 2013-14:

Subdivision	Primary School		Middle School		High School		Higher Secondary School		General College, Univ		Technical / Professional Inst		Non-formal Education	
Subdivision	Institution	Student	Institution	Student	Institution	Student	Institution	Student	Institution	Student	Institution	Student	Institution	Student
Bardhaman Sadar North	947	83,083	42	3,019	122	72,981	92	94,260	8	24,612	38	7,666	2,331	81,318
Bardhaman Sadar South	787	59,920	38	3,138	103	59,680	60	62,371	5	9,521	7	2,069	2,067	64,473
Katwa	601	52,239	21	1,637	74	45,704	42	44,645	3	7,965	8	1,190	1,412	64,979
Kalna	673	54,249	26	1,984	74	55,964	51	65,334	4	9,594	7	663	1,761	67,996
Purba Bardhaman district	3,008	249,491	127	9,778	373	234,329	245	266,610	20	51,692	60	11,588	7,571	277,766

Note: Primary schools include junior basic schools; middle schools, high schools and higher secondary schools include madrasahs; technical schools include junior technical schools, junior government polytechnics, industrial technical institutes, industrial training centres, nursing training institutes etc.; technical and professional colleges include engineering colleges, medical colleges, para-medical institutes, management colleges, teachers training and nursing training colleges, law colleges, art colleges, music colleges etc. Special and non-formal education centres include sishu siksha kendras, madhyamik siksha kendras, centres of Rabindra mukta vidyalaya, recognised Sanskrit tols, institutions for the blind and other handicapped persons, Anganwadi centres, reformatory schools etc.

The following institutions are located in Bardhaman Sadar South subdivision:

- Memari College was established at Memari in 1981.
- Jamalpur Mahavidyalaya was established at Jamalpur in 2010.
- Shyamsundar College was established at Shyamsundar in 1948.
- Sir Rashbehari Ghosh Mahavidyalaya was established at Ukhrid in 2010.
- Acharya Sukumar Sen Mahavidyalaya has been established at Gotan
- Radha Gobinda B Ed Teacher Training College was established at Jhapandanga, PO Keotara.

== Healthcare ==
The table below (all data in numbers) presents an overview of the medical facilities available and patients treated in the hospitals, health centres and sub-centres in 2014 in Purba Bardhaman district, after bifurcation of the erstwhile Bardhaman district in 2017, with data for the year 2013–14.

Subdivision	Health & Family Welfare Deptt, WB				Other State Govt Depts	Local bodies	Central Govt Deptts / PSUs	NGO / Private Nursing Homes	Total	Total Number of Beds	Total Number of Doctors	Indoor Patients	Outdoor Patients
Subdivision	Hospitals	Rural Hospitals	Block Primary Health Centres	Primary Health Centres	Other State Govt Depts	Local bodies	Central Govt Deptts / PSUs	NGO / Private Nursing Homes	Total	Total Number of Beds	Total Number of Doctors	Indoor Patients	Outdoor Patients
Bardhaman Sadar North	1	2	5	23	2	-	1	69	103	2,915	554	156,726	2,525,789
Bardhaman Sadar South	-	1	5	21	-	-	-	12	39	374	41	209,640	1,619,459
Katwa	1	1	5	13	-	-	-	8	28	452	59	65,055	1,291,942
Kalna	1	1	4	17	-	-	-	20	43	619	45	49,640	1,186,491
Purba Bardhaman district	3	5	19	74	2	-	1	109	213	4,360	699	481,061	6,623,681

Medical facilities available in Bardhaman Sadar South subdivision are as follows:

Rural Hospitals: (Name, CD block, location, beds)
Memari Rural Hospital, Memari municipality, Memari, 60 beds
Paharhati Rural Hospital, Memari II CD block, Paharhati, 30 beds
Jamalpur Rural Hospital, Jamalpur CD block, Jamalpur, 30 beds
Maheshbati Rural Hospital, Raina I CD block, Maheshbati, 30 beds
Madhabdihi Rural Hospital, Raina II CD block, Madhabdihi, PO Chhoto-bainan, 30 beds
Block Primary Health Centres: (Name, block, location, 30 beds
Khandaghosh BPHC, Khandaghosh CD Block, Khandaghosh, 15 beds
Primary Health Centres: (CD block-wise)(CD block, PHC location, beds)
Memari I CD block: Debipur (10), Durgapur, PO Chotkharda (10), Palla Road (10)
Memari II CD block: Barapalasan (6), Bitra (10), Bohar (6)
Jamalpur CD block: Chakdighi (10), Chaksmanjari (10), Illasora (4), Nabagram (4)
Raina I CD block: Meral (4), Narugram (6), Shyamsundar (10)
Raina II CD block: Binodpur, PO Bajekamarpur (2), Gotan (6), Kaity (10), Painta (4), Subaldaha, PO Barabainan (10)
Khandaghosh CD block: Khudkuri, PO Sankari (4), Kuley (Gayeshpur), PO Chagram (10), Torkona (4)

== Electoral constituencies ==
Lok Sabha (parliamentary) and Vidhan Sabha (state assembly) constituencies in Bardhaman Sadar South subdivision were as follows:

Lok Sabha constituency	Reservation	Vidhan Sabha constituency	Reservation	CD Block and/or Gram panchayats and/or municipal areas
Bardhaman Purba	Reserved for SC	Raina	Reserved for SC	Raina II CD Block and Hijalna, Natu, Palsona, Sehara, Narugram, Shyamsundar, and Rayna gram panchayats of Raina I CD Block
		Jamalpur	Reserved for SC	Jamalpur CD Block and Mugura gram panchayat of Raina I CD Block
		Memari	None	Memari municipality, Memari I CD Block, and Kuchut, Satgachhia II gram panchayats of Memari II CD Block
		All other Vidhan Sabha segments outside Bardhaman Sadar South subdivision		
Bardhaman-Durgapur	None	Manteswar	None	Baghsan, Vagra Mulgram, Denur, Jamna, Kusumgram, Majhergram, Mamudpur I, Manteswar, Pipalan and Shushunia gram panchayats of Manteswar CD Block in Kalna subdivision and Barapalason I, Barapalason II, Bohar I, Bohar II, Bijur I, Bijur II and Satgachhia I gram panchayats of Memari II CD Block
		All other Vidhan Sabha segments outside Bardhaman Sadar South subdivision		
Bishnupur	Reserved for SC	Khandaghosh	Reserved for SC	Khandaghosh CD Block and Adra, Bhuri, Gohogram, Khano, Maszidpur, Sanko and Satinadi gram panchayats of Galsi II CD Block in Bardhaman Sadar North subdivision
		All other Vidhan Sabha segments outside Bardhaman Sadar South subdivision		
