= Srirampur railway station =

Railway Station in West Bengal, India

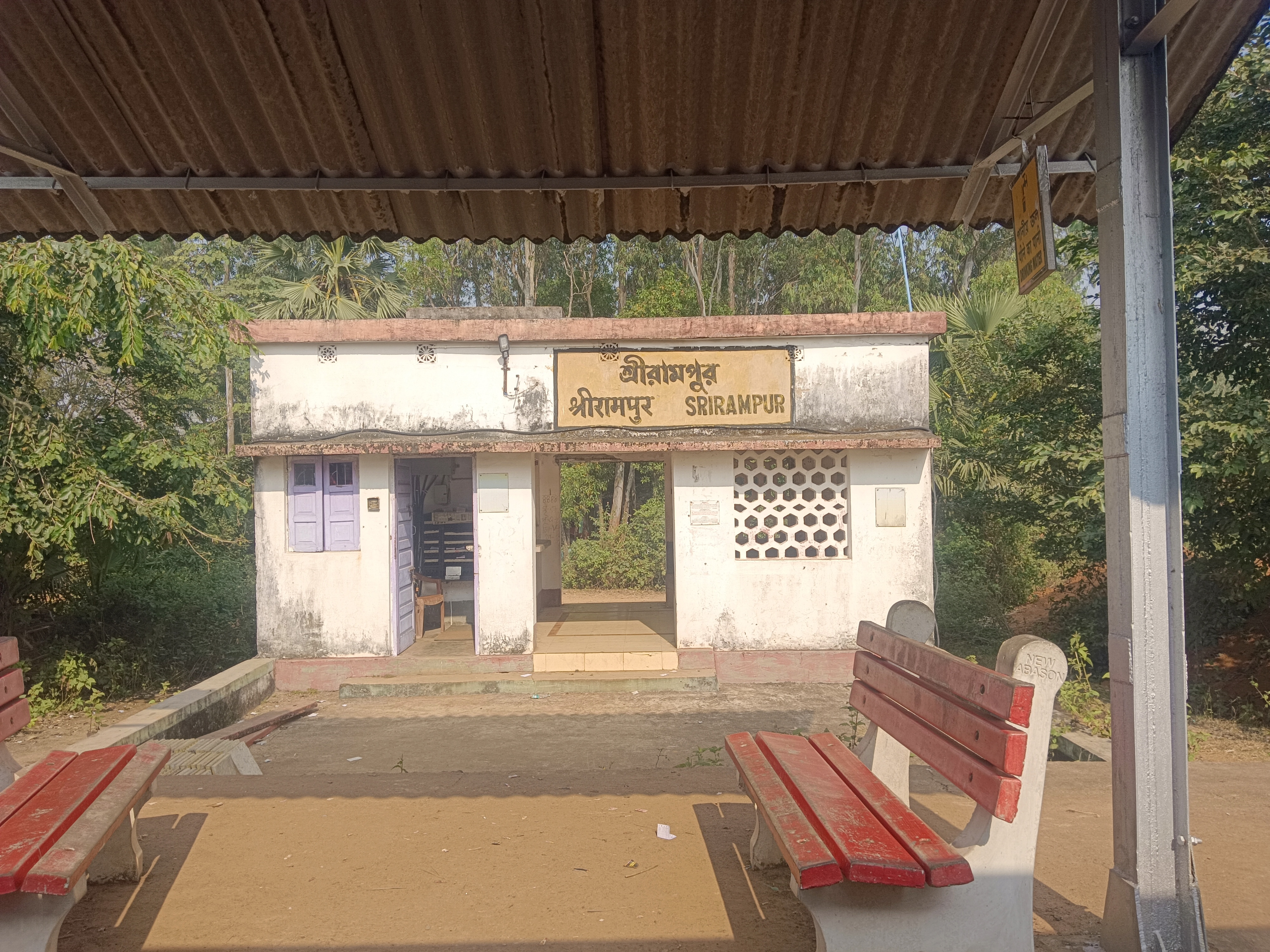
- Srirampur railway station

General information
- Location: Sonamukhi Main Road, Mathuraberia, Srirampur, Bankura district, West Bengal; India
- Coordinates: 23°19′28″N 87°19′09″E
- Elevation: 74 metres (243 ft)
- System: Indian Railway
- Owner: Indian Railways
- Operator: South Eastern Railway
- Line: Bankura–Masagram line
- Platforms: 1
- Tracks: 1

Construction
- Structure type: Standard (on-ground station)
- Parking: No

Other information
- Status: Functioning
- Station code: SIMR
- Division(s): Adra

History
- Opened: 1916
- Closed: 1995
- Rebuilt: 2005
- Electrified: 2018–19
- Former names: Bankura Damodar Railway

Services
Preceding station	Indian Railways	Following station
Brindabanpur towards ?	South Eastern Railway zone Bankura–Masagram line	Hamirhati towards ?
Location

Srirampur railway station is a halt railway station of Bankura–Masagram line under the Adra railway division of South Eastern Railway zone. It is situated beside Sonamukhi Main Road, Mathuraberia at Srirampur in Bankura district in the Indian state of West Bengal.

== History ==
Old narrow-gauge Bankura–Damodar Railway (also called as Bankura Damodar River Railway) connecting Bankura and Rainagar in Bankura and Bardhaman districts was opened to traffic in sections between 1916 and 1917. In 2005, the 118 kilometers long railway section known as Bankura–Masagram line was converted to 1,676 mm (5 ft 6 in) broad gauge. The whole track including Srirampur railway station was electrified in 2018–19.
