= Bowaichandi railway station =

Railway station in West Bengal, India

General information
- Location: Bowaichandi, Purba Bardhaman district, West Bengal; India
- Coordinates: 23°07′54″N 87°43′35″E
- Elevation: 38 metres (125 ft)
- System: Indian Railway
- Owner: Indian Railways
- Operator: South Eastern Railway
- Line: Bankura–Masagram line
- Platforms: 1
- Tracks: 1

Construction
- Structure type: Standard (on-ground station)
- Parking: No

Other information
- Status: Functioning
- Station code: BWCN
- Division(s): Adra

History
- Opened: 1916
- Closed: 1995
- Rebuilt: 2005
- Electrified: 2018–19
- Former names: Bankura Damodar Railway

Services
Preceding station	Indian Railways	Following station
Sahaspur Road towards Bankura Junction	South Eastern Railway zone Bankura–Masagram line	Guir Saranga towards Masagram Junction
Location

Bowaichandi railway station is a railway station of Bankura–Masagram line under the Adra railway division of South Eastern Railway zone. It is situated at Bowaichandi in Purba Bardhaman district in the Indian state of West Bengal.

== History ==
Old narrow gauge Bankura–Damodar Railway (also called as Bankura Damodar River Railway) connecting Bankura and Rainagar in Bankura and Bardhaman districts was opened to traffic in sections between 1916 and 1917. In 2005, the 118 kilometers long railway section known as Bankura–Masagram line was converted to 1,676 mm (5 ft 6 in) broad gauge. The whole track including Bowaichandi railway station was electrified in 2018–19.
