= Bankura Sammilani College =

College in West Bengal

- Type: Undergraduate college
- Established: 1 September 1948; 77 years ago
- Affiliations: Bankura University
- President: Arup Chakraborty
- Principal: Dr. Swapan Mukhopadhyay
- Students: 2117 (2010–2011 Session)
- Location: Bankura, West Bengal, India; 23.2360°N 87.0477°E
- Campus: Urban
- Website: www.bankurasammilanicollege.net
- Location in West Bengal Bankura Sammilani College (India)

Bankura Sammilani College, established in 1948, is one of the oldest colleges in Bankura district. It offers undergraduate courses in arts, commerce and sciences. It is the first National Assessment and Accreditation Council (NAAC) accredited college in Bankura District with B++.Bankura University

== History ==
Bankura Sammilani College is established to promote the higher education in Bankura and its neighbour districts by Bankura Sammilani Registered Society. With an aim to provide a platform for higher education to the financially weaker peoples of Bankura it started its journey on 1 September 1948 with 100 students (boys) and 6 teachers of intermediate science. Initially it was only for boys but its status changed to co-education from the session 1992–1993. From its inception it was a trust college and became govt-aided college on 22 April 1977.

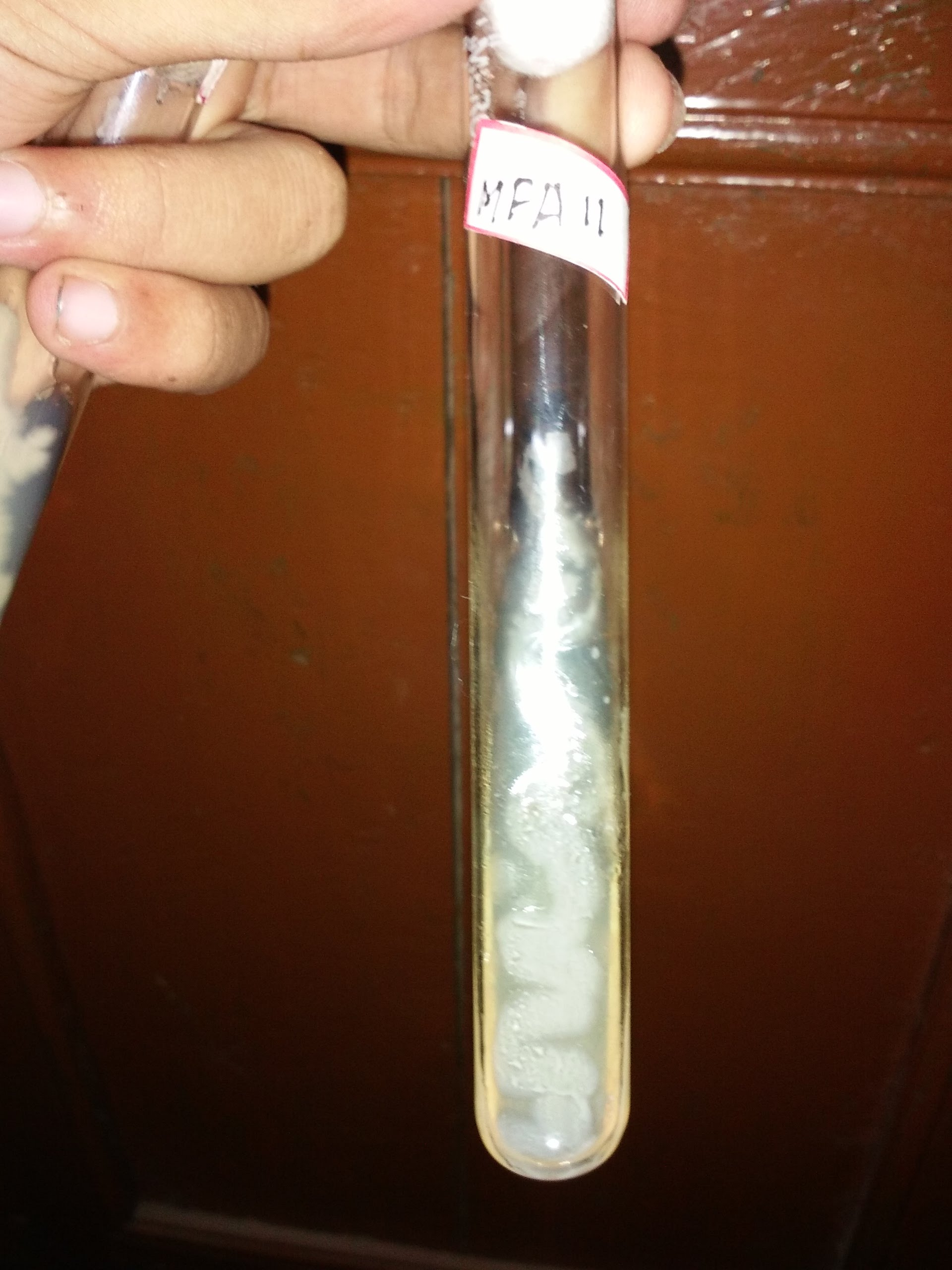
Slant culture-Microbiology Department

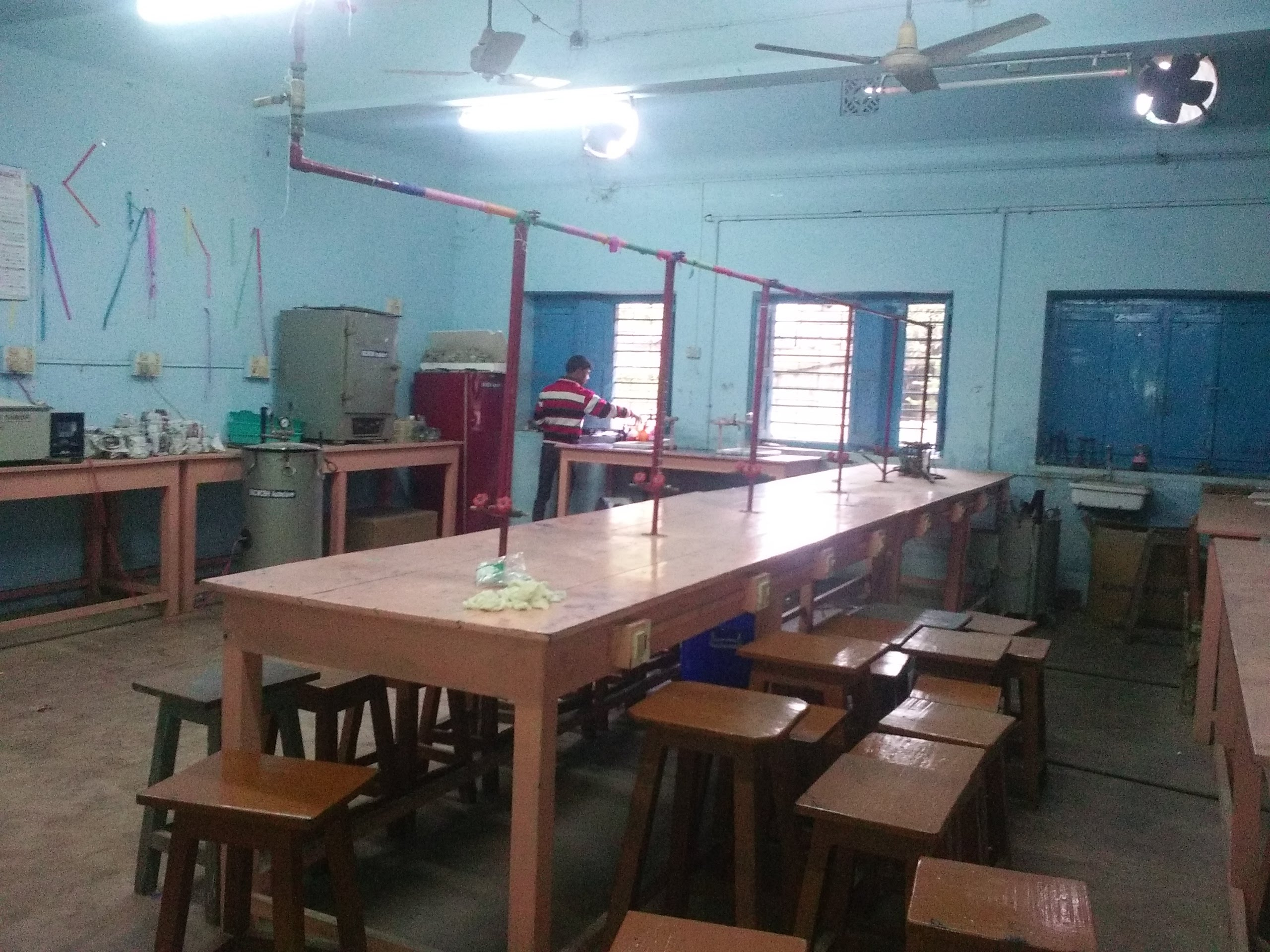
Microbiology Department view

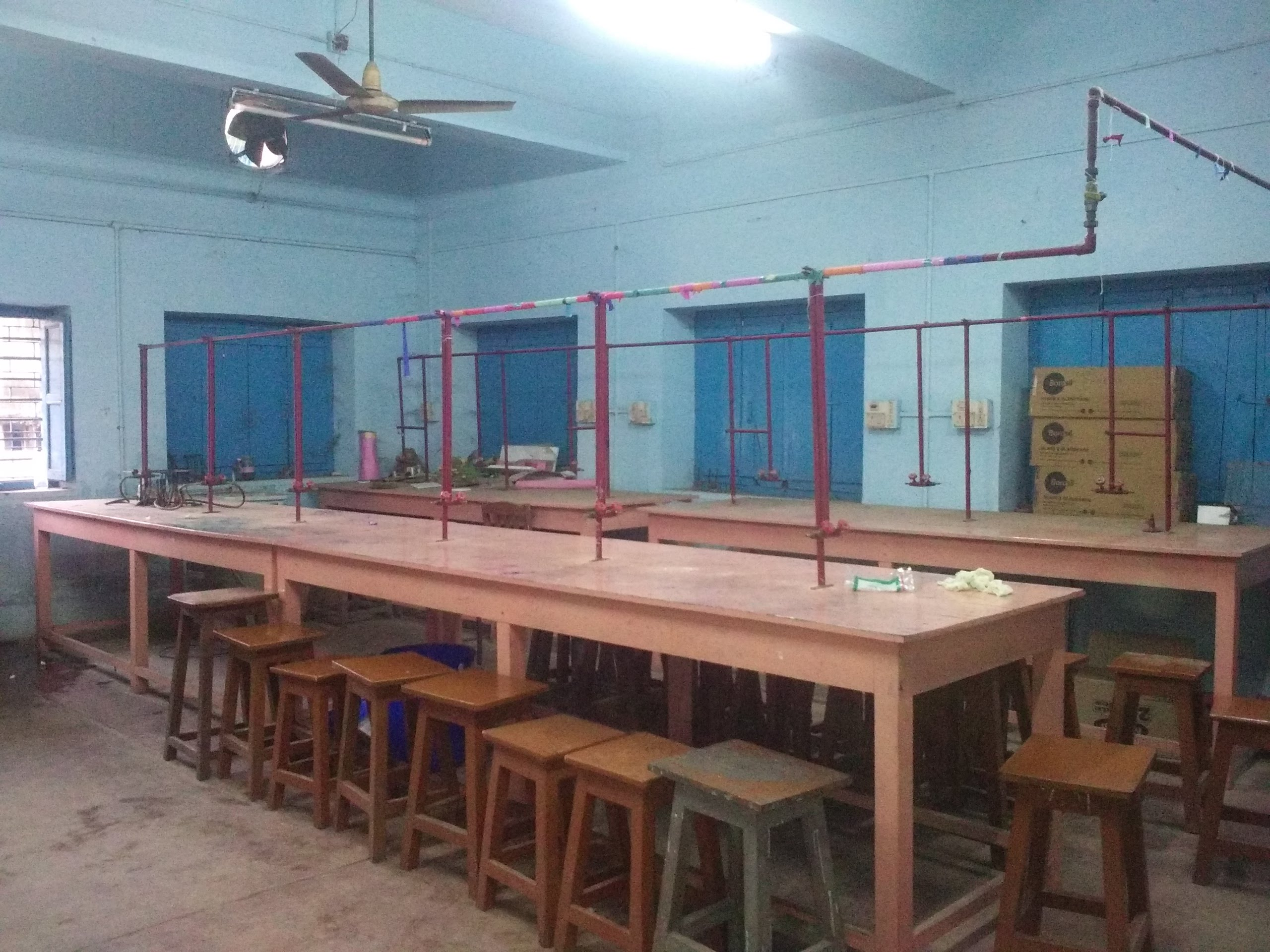
Microbiology Department

== Affiliation and accreditation ==
The college was initially under the affiliation of calcutta university from 6 August 1948. It comes under the affiliation of Burdwan University in 1960. The college is recognised by the University Grants Commission (UGC).

== Admission ==
Admission to the first-year undergraduate classes are usually held after the publication of the result of the Higher Secondary Examination under the West Bengal Council of Higher Secondary Education and is based strictly on merit through open counseling procedure.

Admission in the college can be get through WBCAP Portal June/July every year.

== Shifts ==
In the initial days it runs in three shifts. B.Com(introduced in 1959) in evening shift, B.A (introduced in 1970) in morning and BSc(introduced in 1959) in day shift. Currently the college runs in two shifts.B.Com courses are being taught in morning shift and all B.A and BSc courses are in day shift.

== Departments ==
Currently 16 different honours courses in Arts, Science and Commerce are being taught in the college.

=== Science ===
Department	Course Type	Intake
Chemistry	BSc (Hons)	32
Chemistry	BSc(Pass)	300
Chemistry	PhD	03
Computer Science	BSc (Hons)	40
Computer Science	BSc(General)	–
Economics	–	–
Physics	–	–
Mathematics	–	–
Microbiology	–	–
Zoology	BSc (Hons)	37
Zoology	BSc (General)	164
Botany	–	–

=== Arts ===
Department	Course Type	Intake
Bengali	B.A (Hons)	60
Bengali	B.A(Pass)	–
English	B.A (Hons)	60
English	B.A(Pass)	–
Sanskrit	B.A (Hons)	60
Sanskrit	B.A(Pass)	–
Political Science	B.A (Hons)	60
Political Science	B.A(Pass)	–
History	B.A (Hons)	60
History	B.A(Pass)	–

=== Commerce ===
The college has commerce Department.

General	Schedule Caste	Schedule Tribe	Physically Handicapped	Total Seats
140	44	12	4	200

== Extra activities ==
The college has taken some initiative for students benefit. The college provides opportunity for Spoken English classes with the help of BBC Bankura Branch. It has Computer Literacy Program with Webel Informatics Limited from 1996. The college also provides opportunities to pursue different courses with the help of Institute of Cost and Works Accountants of India from March 2009

== Notable alumni ==
- Subrat Dutta, Actor.

== See also ==
- List of institutions of higher education in West Bengal
- Education in India
- Education in West Bengal
