= Sonamukhi College =

College in West Bengal

Sonamukhi College সোনামুখী মহাবিদ্যালয়
- Type: Undergraduate college
- Established: 1966; 60 years ago
- Affiliations: Bankura University
- President: Sri Manas Mondal
- Principal: Dr. Bappaditya Mandal
- Location: Sonamukhi, West Bengal, 722207, India; 23.2947859°N 87.4085878°E
- Campus: Urban
- Website: http://www.sonamukhicollege.ac.in/
- Location within West Bengal Location within India

Sonamukhi College (established in 1966) is the general degree college in Sonamukhi, Bankura district.It offers undergraduate courses in arts, commerce and sciences. It is affiliated to Bankura University.

It has been accredited by the National Assessment and Accreditation Council of India with "B+" certificate.

== Departments ==
=== Science ===
- Computer Science
- Physics
- Mathematics
- Botany
- Zoology
- Chemistry

=== Arts and Commerce ===
- Bengali
- English
- Sanskrit
- History
- Geography
- Political Science
- Philosophy
- Physical Education
- Education
- Economics
- Commerce
- Social Work
- Computer Science

== Accreditation ==
The college is recognized by the University Grants Commission (UGC).

== Admission ==
Admission to the first-year undergraduate classes are usually held after the publication of the result of the Higher Secondary Examination under the West Bengal Council of Higher Secondary Education and is based strictly on merit through open counseling procedure.

Admission in the college can be get through West Bengal Centralised Admission Portal Portal June/July every year.

== See also ==
- List of institutions of higher education in West Bengal
- Education in India
- Education in West Bengal
