= GSQ =

GSQ may refer to:

- GSQ, the IATA code for Sharq El Owainat Airport, Egypt
- GSQ, the Indian Railways station code for Guir Saranga railway station, West Bengal, India
