= Rainagar railway station =

Railway station in West Bengal, India

General information
- Location: Raina, Purba Bardhaman district, West Bengal; India
- Coordinates: 23°04′07″N 87°53′11″E
- Elevation: 26 metres (85 ft)
- System: Indian Railway
- Owner: Indian Railways
- Operator: South Eastern Railway
- Line: Bankura–Masagram line
- Platforms: 2
- Tracks: 1

Construction
- Structure type: Standard (on-ground station)
- Parking: No

Other information
- Status: Functioning
- Station code: RNGR
- Division(s): Adra

History
- Opened: 1916
- Closed: 1995
- Rebuilt: 2005
- Electrified: 2018–19
- Former names: Bankura Damodar Railway

Services
Preceding station	Indian Railways	Following station
Shyamsundar towards Bankura Junction	South Eastern Railway zone Bankura–Masagram line	Bokra towards Masagram Junction
Location

Rainagar railway station is a railway station of Bankura–Masagram line under the Adra railway division of South Eastern Railway zone. It is situated at Raina in Purba Bardhaman district in the Indian state of West Bengal.

== History ==
Old narrow gauge Bankura–Damodar Railway (also called as Bankura Damodar River Railway) connecting Bankura and Rainagar in Bankura and Bardhaman districts was opened to traffic in sections between 1916 and 1917.

== Controversy ==
=== Nameless railway station of India ===
The railway station is located at a distance of about 35 km (20 mi) from Bardhaman in West Bengal. This railway station is situated between two villages Raina and Rainagarh. This station located on the railway station Bankura–Massagram rail line was known as Rainagarh. But soon the people of Raina village did not like this thing and a quarrel started between the two villages over the name of the station. The building of this station was constructed on the land of Raina village, so the people of the village believed that Raina should be.

The quarrel had reached the Railway Board regarding the name of the station. After the quarrel, the Indian Railways removed the name of the station from all the sign boards installed here, due to which the passengers coming from outside have to face a lot of trouble. As the quarrel does not end, the railways still issues tickets for the station from its old name, Rainagarh. People of both villages can tell when the ongoing dispute over the name of the station will end. Although there is no name on the station signboard, in official records the station still goes by the name of Raina/Renanagar (RNGR).
