= Brindabanpur railway station =

Railway station in West Bengal, India

General information
- Location: Patrasayer Road, Brindabanpur, Bankura district, West Bengal; India
- Coordinates: 23°18′27″N 87°16′49″E
- Elevation: 81 metres (266 ft)
- System: Indian Railway
- Owner: Indian Railways
- Operator: South Eastern Railway
- Line: Bankura–Masagram line
- Platforms: 1
- Tracks: 1

Construction
- Structure type: Standard (on-ground station)
- Parking: No

Other information
- Status: Functioning
- Station code: BDPR
- Division(s): Adra

History
- Opened: 1916
- Closed: 1995
- Rebuilt: 2005
- Electrified: 2018–19
- Former names: Bankura Damodar Railway

Services
Preceding station	Indian Railways	Following station
Chander towards ?	South Eastern Railway zone Bankura–Masagram line	Srirampur towards ?
Location

Brindabanpur railway station is a railway station of Bankura–Masagram line under the Adra railway division of South Eastern Railway zone. It is situated beside Patrasayer Road at Brindabanpur in Bankura district in the Indian state of West Bengal.

== History ==
Old narrow-gauge Bankura–Damodar Railway (also called as Bankura Damodar River Railway) connecting Bankura and Rainagar in Bankura and Bardhaman districts was opened to traffic in sections between 1916 and 1917. In 2005, the 118 kilometers long railway section known as Bankura–Masagram line was converted to 1,676 mm (5 ft 6 in) broad gauge. The whole track including Brindabanpur railway station was electrified in 2018–19.
