= Sonamukhi railway station =

Railway station in West Bengal, India

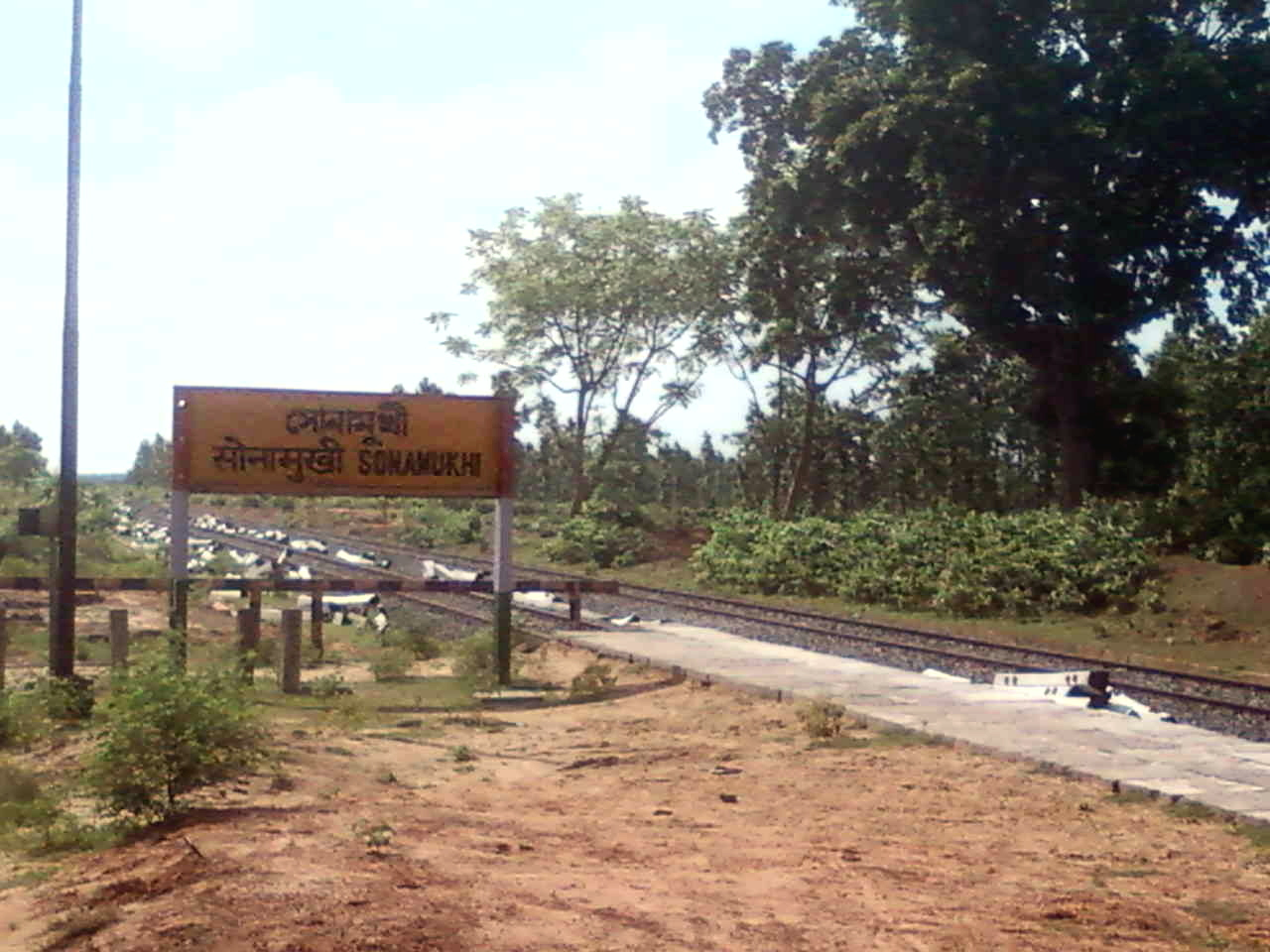

General information
- Location: Bishnupur-Sonamukhi Road, Sonamukhi, Bankura district, West Bengal; India
- Coordinates: 23°17′37″N 87°24′53″E
- Elevation: 75 metres (246 ft)
- System: Indian Railway
- Owner: Indian Railways
- Operator: South Eastern Railway
- Line: Bankura–Masagram line
- Platforms: 2
- Tracks: 1

Construction
- Structure type: Standard (on-ground station)
- Parking: No

Other information
- Status: Functioning
- Station code: SONA
- Division(s): Adra

History
- Opened: 1916
- Closed: 1995
- Rebuilt: 2005
- Former names: Bankura Damodar Railway

Services
| Preceding station | Indian Railways | Following station |
|---|---|---|
| Hamirhati towards ? | South Eastern Railway zone Bankura–Masagram line | Dhansimla towards ? |
Location

Sonamukhi railway station is a railway station of Bankura–Masagram line under the Adra railway division of South Eastern Railway zone. It is situated beside Bishnupur–Sonamukhi Road at Sonamukhi in Bankura district in the Indian state of West Bengal.

== History ==
Old narrow-gauge Bankura–Damodar Railway (also called as Bankura Damodar River Railway) connecting Bankura and Rainagar in Bankura and Bardhaman districts was opened to traffic in sections between 1916 and 1917. In 2005, the 118 km-long railway section known as Bankura–Masagram line was converted to 1,676 mm (5 ft 6 in) broad gauge. The whole track including Sonamukhi railway station was electrified in 2018–19.
