= Sat Deul =

Temple in West Bengal, India

- An ASI Listed Monument
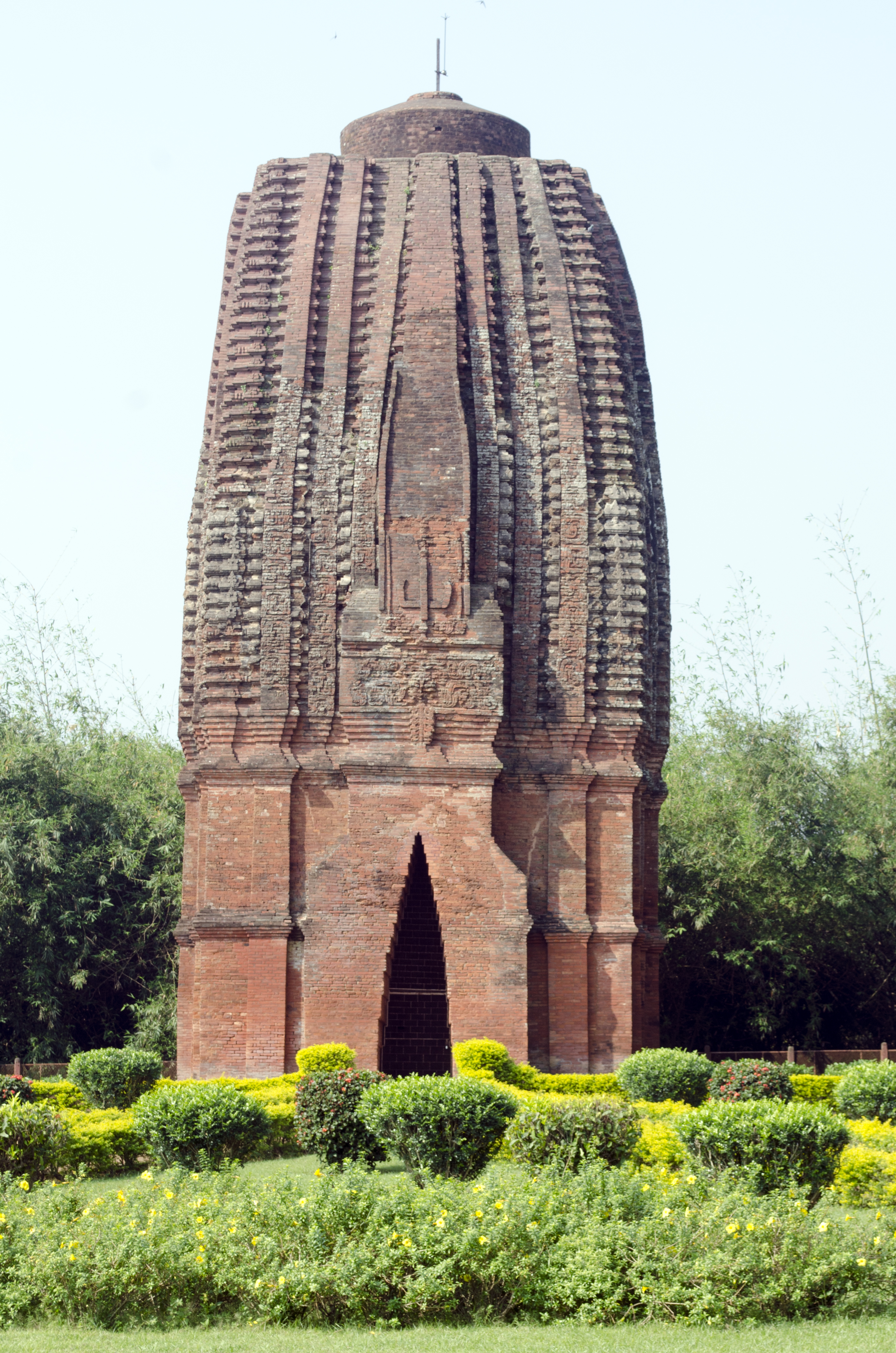

- Location within West Bengal Location within India

Religion
- Affiliation: Jainism

Location
- Location: Sat Deule/ Deule; Purba Bardhaman
- State: West Bengal
- Country: India
- Interactive map of Sat Deul
- Coordinates: 23.1536°N 88.0441°E

Sat Deul is a 10th-11th century temple at Deule / Sat Deule in the Memari I CD block in the Bardhaman Sadar South subdivision of the Purba Bardhaman district in the Indian state of West Bengal.

== Location ==
Cities and towns in the Bardhaman Sadar South subdivision of Purba Bardhaman district
M: municipal city/ town, CT: census town, R: rural/ urban centre, H: historical/ religious centre.
Owing to space constraints in the small map, the actual locations in a larger map may vary slightly

Sat Deul is located at 23.1536°N 88.0441°E

Sat Deul is located east of the Durgapur Expressway (part of National Highway 19) and is approachable via the Memari-Tarakeswar Road. It is 3.5 km from Chanchai railway station on the Howrah-Bardhaman chord line.

== Rekha deul ==
David J. McCutchion says that the predominant traditional architectural style for temples in the western areas of Bengal in the pre-Muslim period is the tall curvilinear rekha deul and it went on developing from the late 7th century or early 8th century to around the 12th century, increasing its complexity and height but retaining its basic features. Such temples had "curvilinear shikhara with chaitya mesh decoration, surmounted by a large amalaka and kalasa finial. Examples of such dilapidated deuls are still standing at Satdeula (in Bardhaman), Bahulara and Sonatapal (in Bankura), and Deulghat (in Purulia). On the brick deuls already mentioned here, plus Jatar (in 24 Parganas) and Para (in Purulia), "we find extensive and remarkably fine stucco work on carved brick".

== Highlights ==
This brick-built temple shows the features of the Nagara style. The ground plan is pancha-ratha, surmounted by a curvilinear tower. The temple has stucco works over carved bricks. Jaina sculptures found at the place may indicate that it belonged to the Jaina faith and the temple is datable to c. 10th-11th century CE. P.C. Dasgupta, in the Jain Journal 7/3: 130- 132, 1973, mentions Sat deuliya as a rare Jain icon. In the List of Monuments of National Importance in West Bengal it is mentioned as a Jain brick temple.

== Sat Deul picture gallery ==
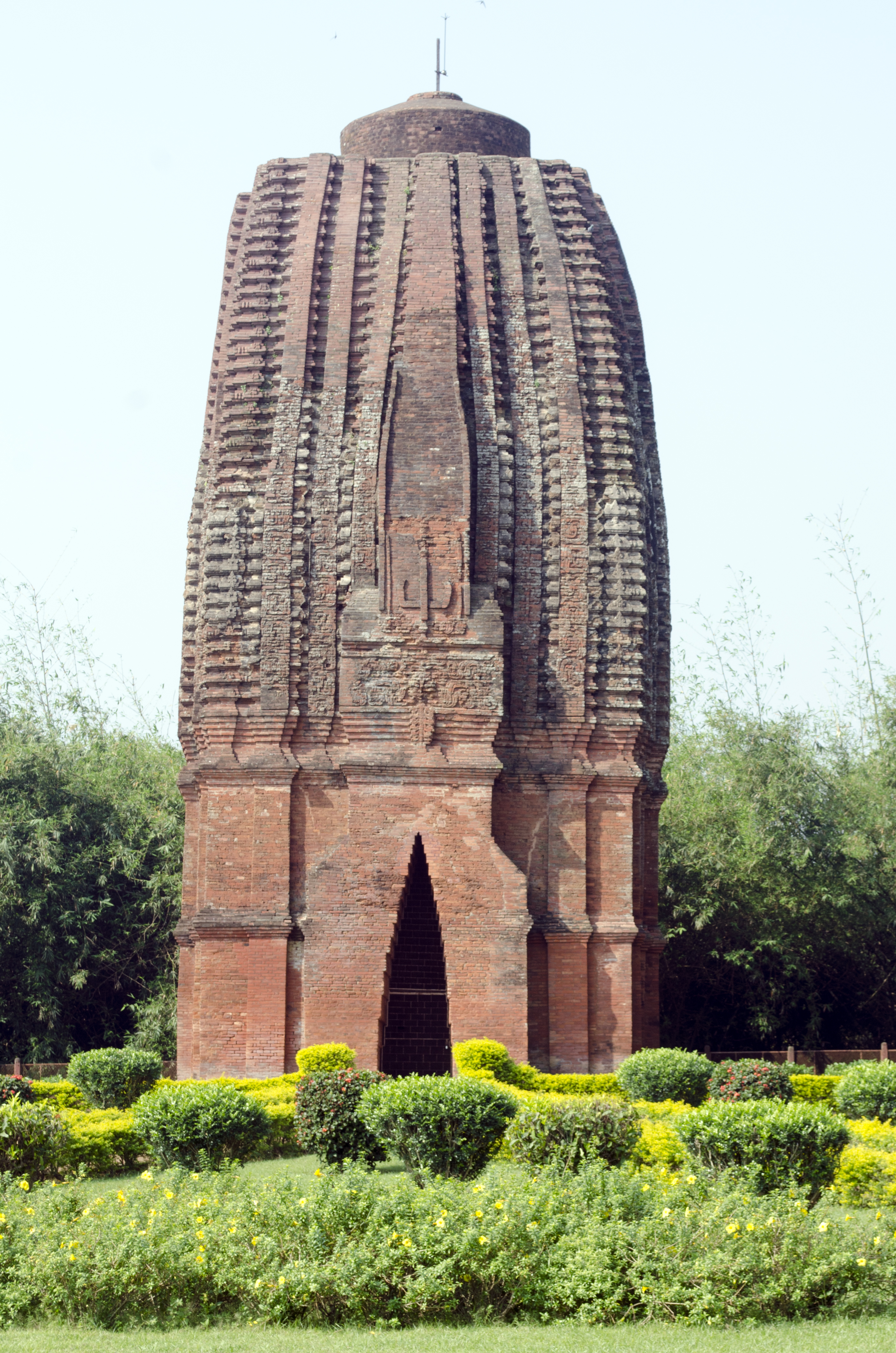

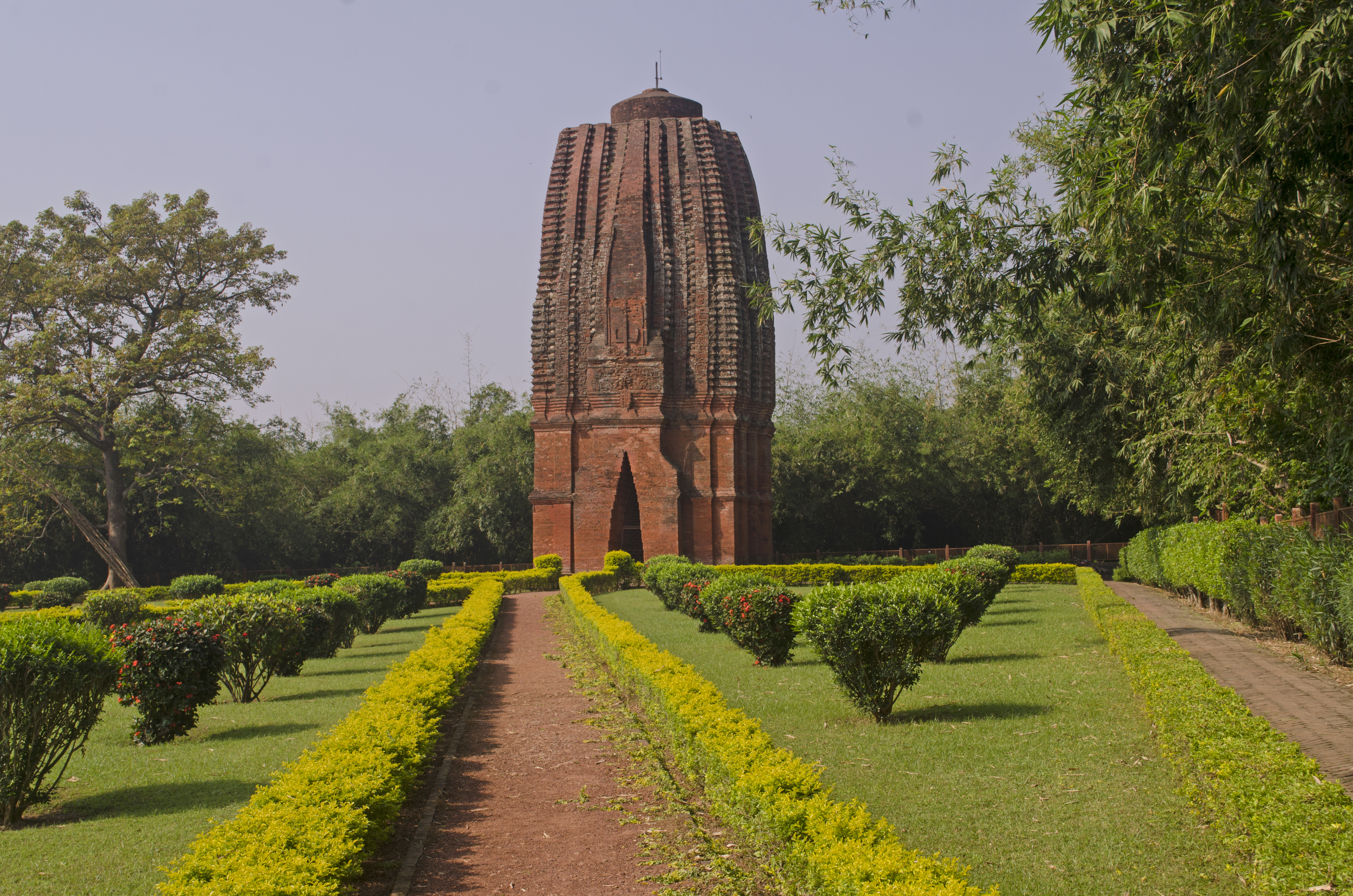

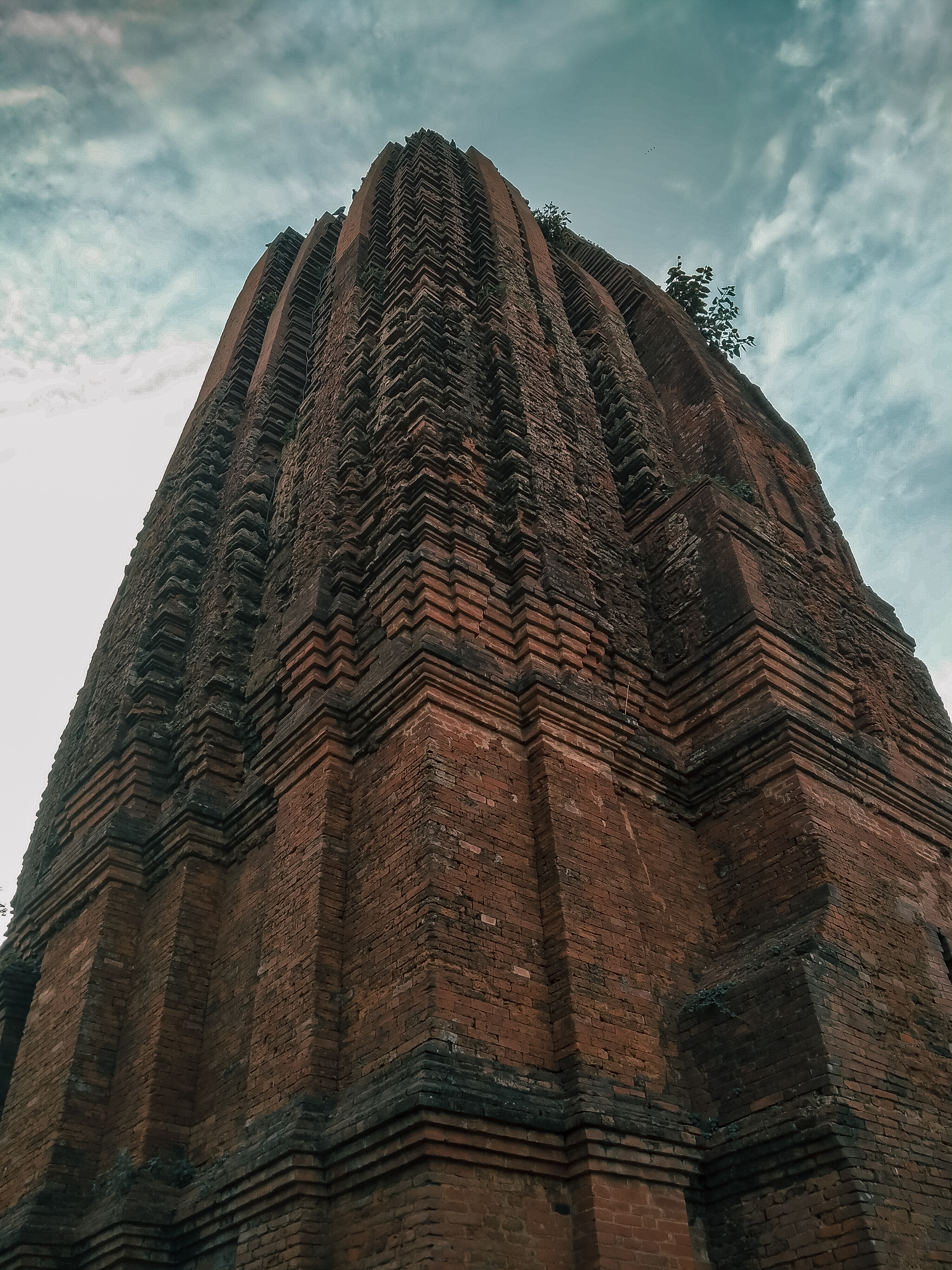
Close view of Satdeul Temple.

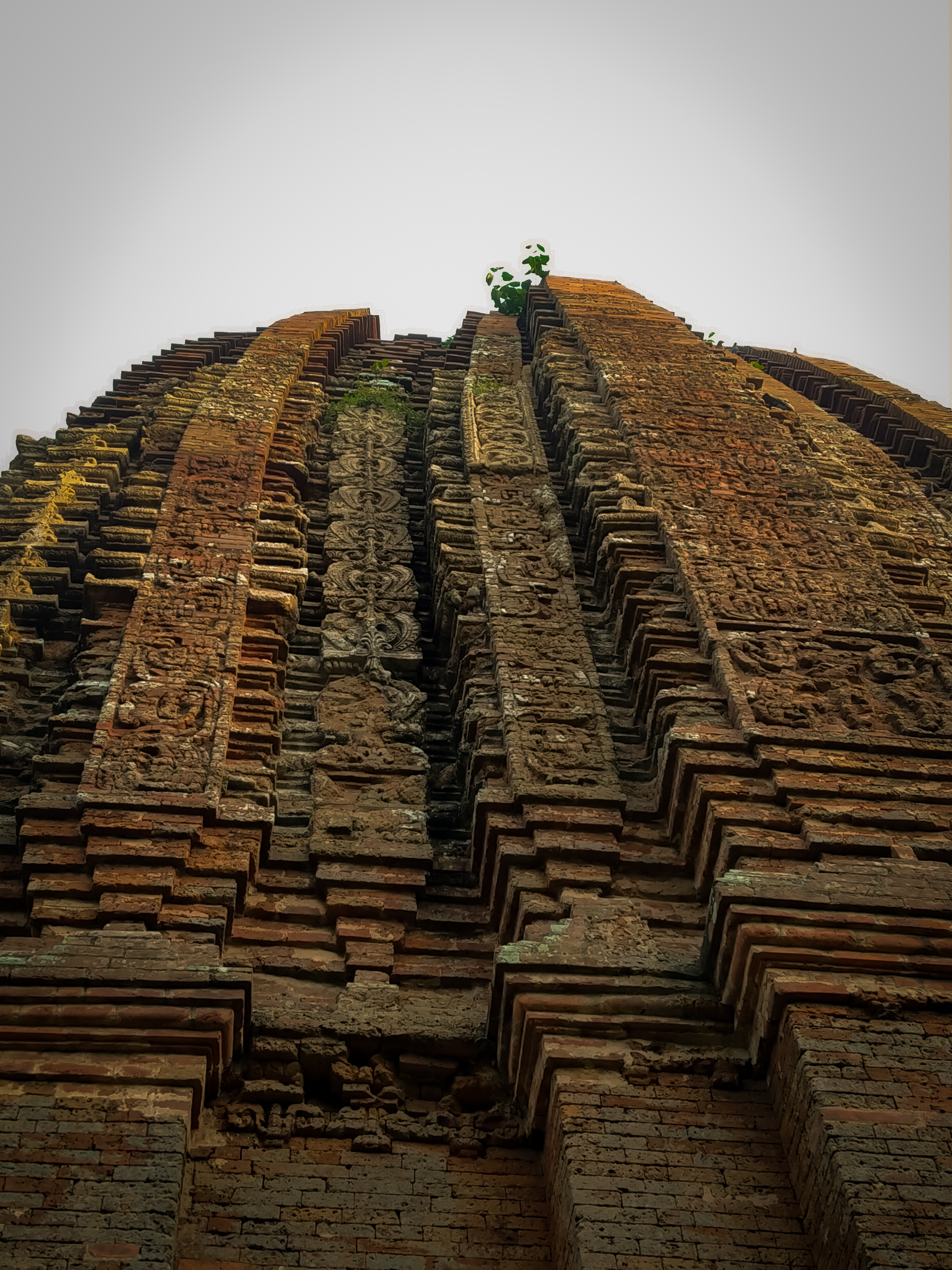
Floral and Geometric works on the temple.

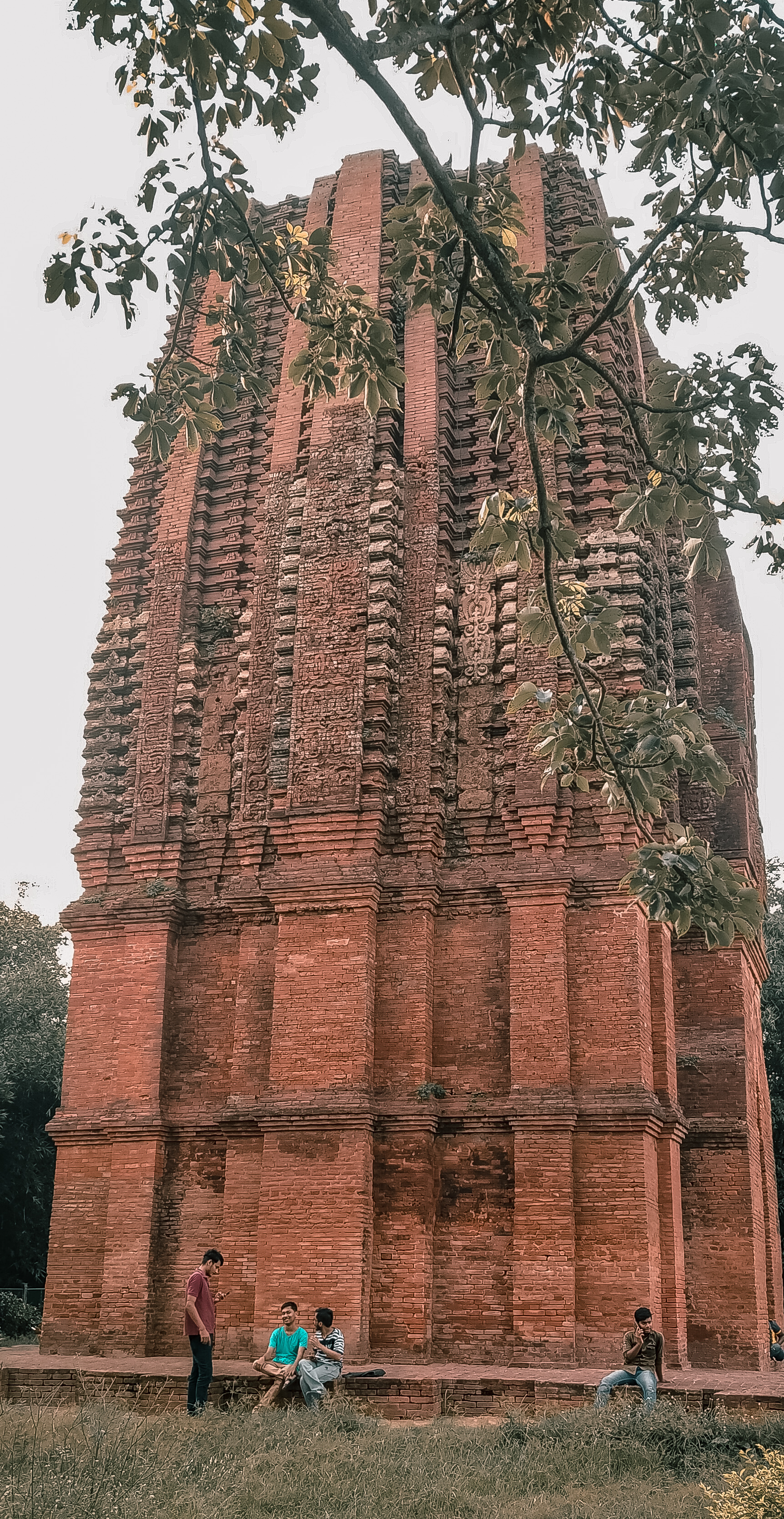
Intricate designs on the side of Satdeul.
