= Deulghata =

Village in Purulia district

- Deulghat
- Location within West Bengal Location within India
- 23.3796°N 86.1311°E
- Type: Ancient/Medieval temples
- Location: Arsha (community development block), Purulia district
- Region: West Bengal, India

History
- Built: 9th/10th century

Deulghata (also called Deulghat), near Baram in the Arsha (community development block) in the Purulia Sadar subdivision of the Purulia district of West Bengal, India. It has ancient/ medieval temples.

== Geography ==
Places in Purulia Sadar subdivision in Purulia district
M: municipality, CT: census town, R: rural/ urban centre, H: historical/ religious centre, F: facility
Owing to space constraints in the small map, the actual locations in a larger map may vary slightly

=== Location ===
Deulghata is located at 23.3796°N 86.1311°E

Note: The map alongside presents some of the notable locations in the subdivision. All places marked in the map are linked in the larger full screen map.

== Background ==
Deulghata, on the bank of the Kangsabati, some 6 km south of Jaypur and about 25 km from Purulia town once had 15 temples and some small shrines, built around the 9th-10th century. The Archaeological Survey of India has taken over the place that includes three tall surviving temples.

== History ==
In 1864–65, E.T. Dalton, Commissioner of Chhotanagpur, visited the place and found three large temples in the midst of the ruins of many more. J.D. Beglar, of the Archaeological Survey of India, also reports the three temples in 1872–73.

=== Rekha deul ===
David J. McCutchion says that the predominant traditional architectural style for temples in the western areas of Bengal in the pre-Muslim period is the tall curvilinear rekha deul and it went on developing from the late 7th century or early 8th century to around the 12th century, increasing its complexity and height but retaining its basic features. Such temples had “curvilinear shikhara with chaitya mesh decoration, surmounted by a large amalaka and kalasa finial. Examples of such dilapidated deuls are still standing at Satdeula (in Bardhaman), Bahulara and Sonatapal (in Bankura) and Deulghat (in Purulia). On the brick deuls already mentioned here, plus Jatar (in 24 Parganas) and Para (in Purulia), “we find extensive and remarkably fine stucco work on carved brick”.

== Present scenario ==
There are two tall brick deuls with stucco decoration. The other temples at Deulghata, mostly of stone, have fallen down. “All the three have triangular corbelled entrances with towers built up by interior corbelling. The corbelled entrance of the southern temple is high and graceful with a delicate curve. All of them have rich curved brickwork with stucco application. They depict chaityas and miniature rekha motifs. The stucco application includes scrollwork with geese and foliation, dwarfs familiar from Pala–Sena age art. The stucco is fine and would appear to date from the same period as that on the Bahulara and Satdeulia temples.”

== Picture gallery ==
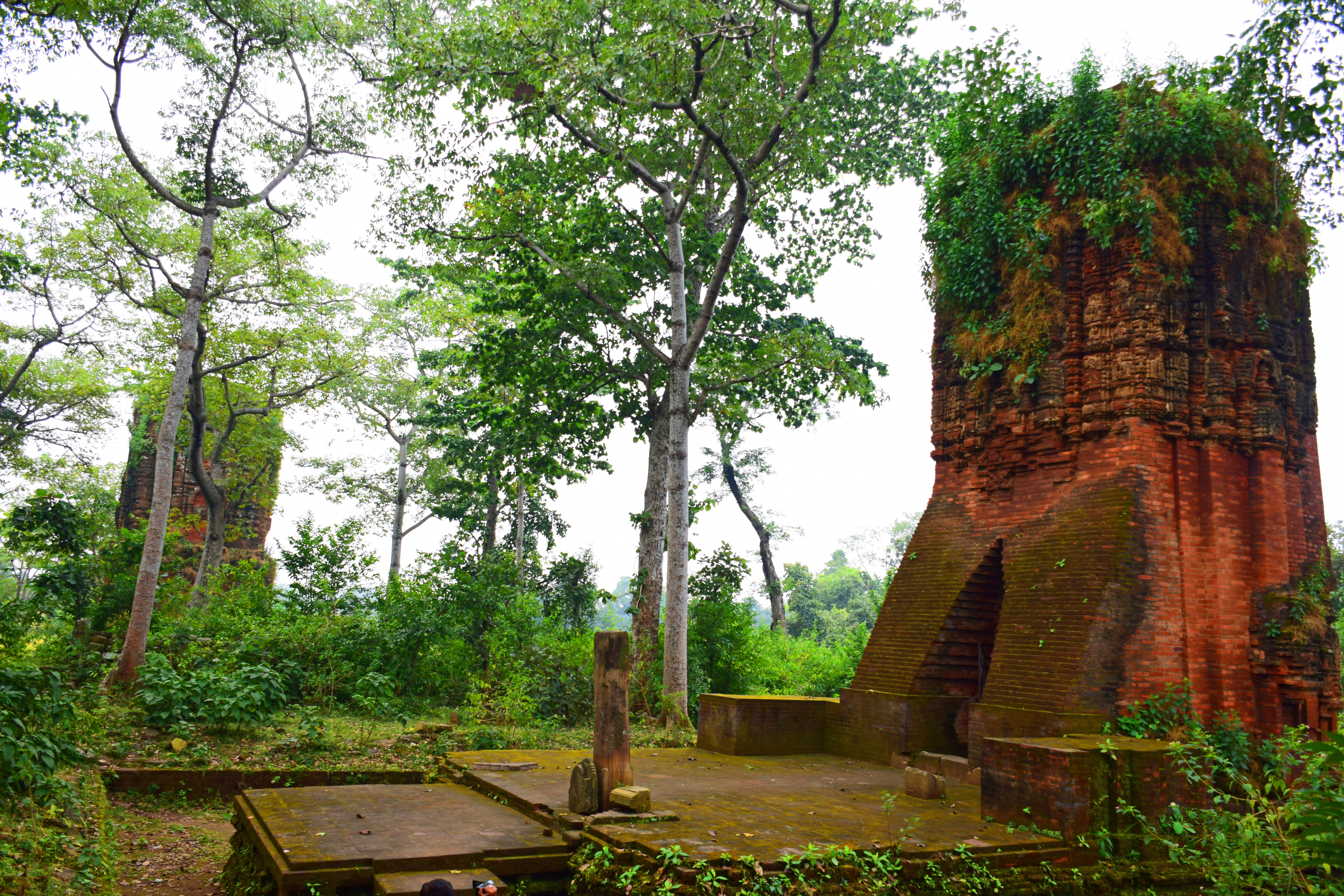
Two brick deuls

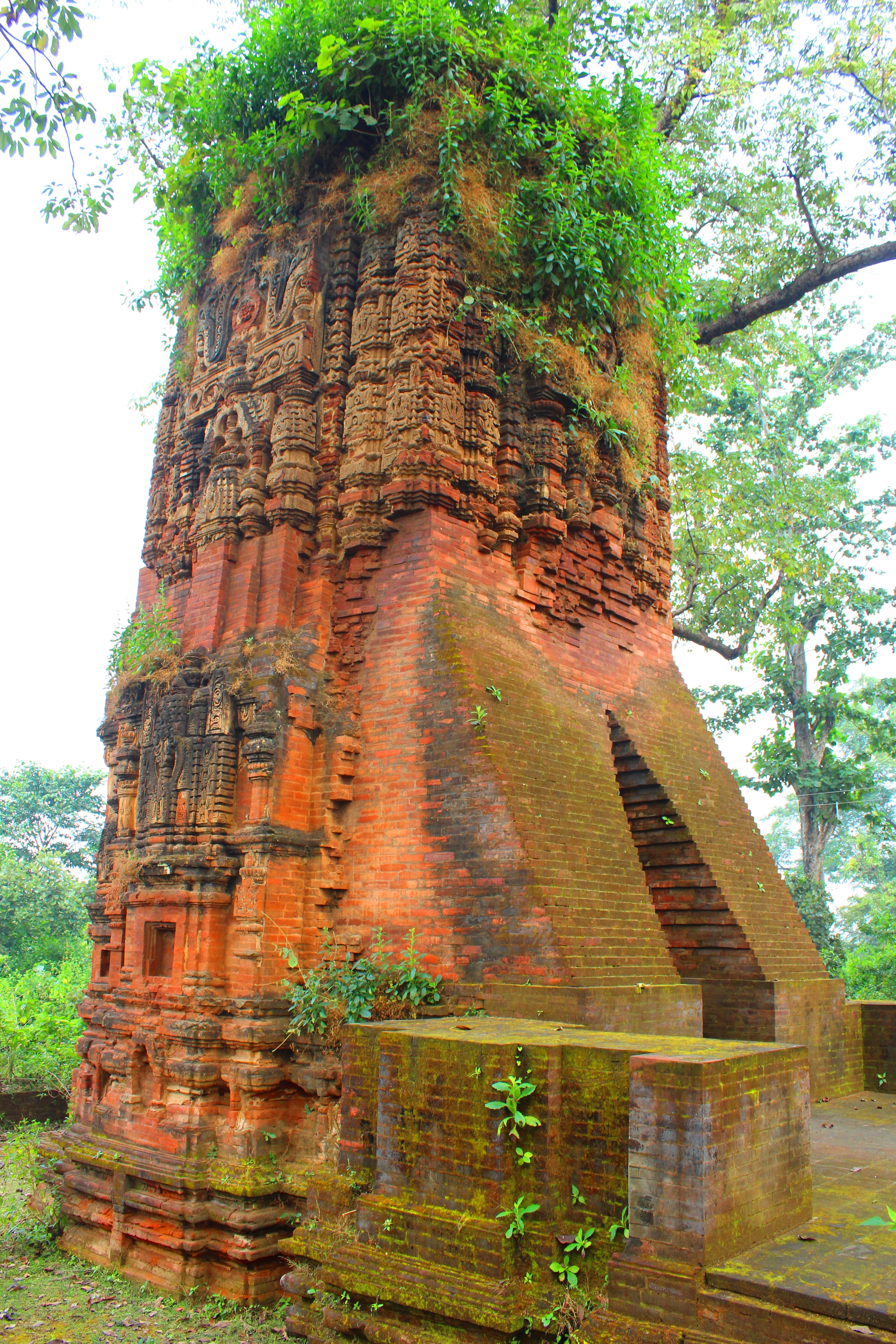
The first deul

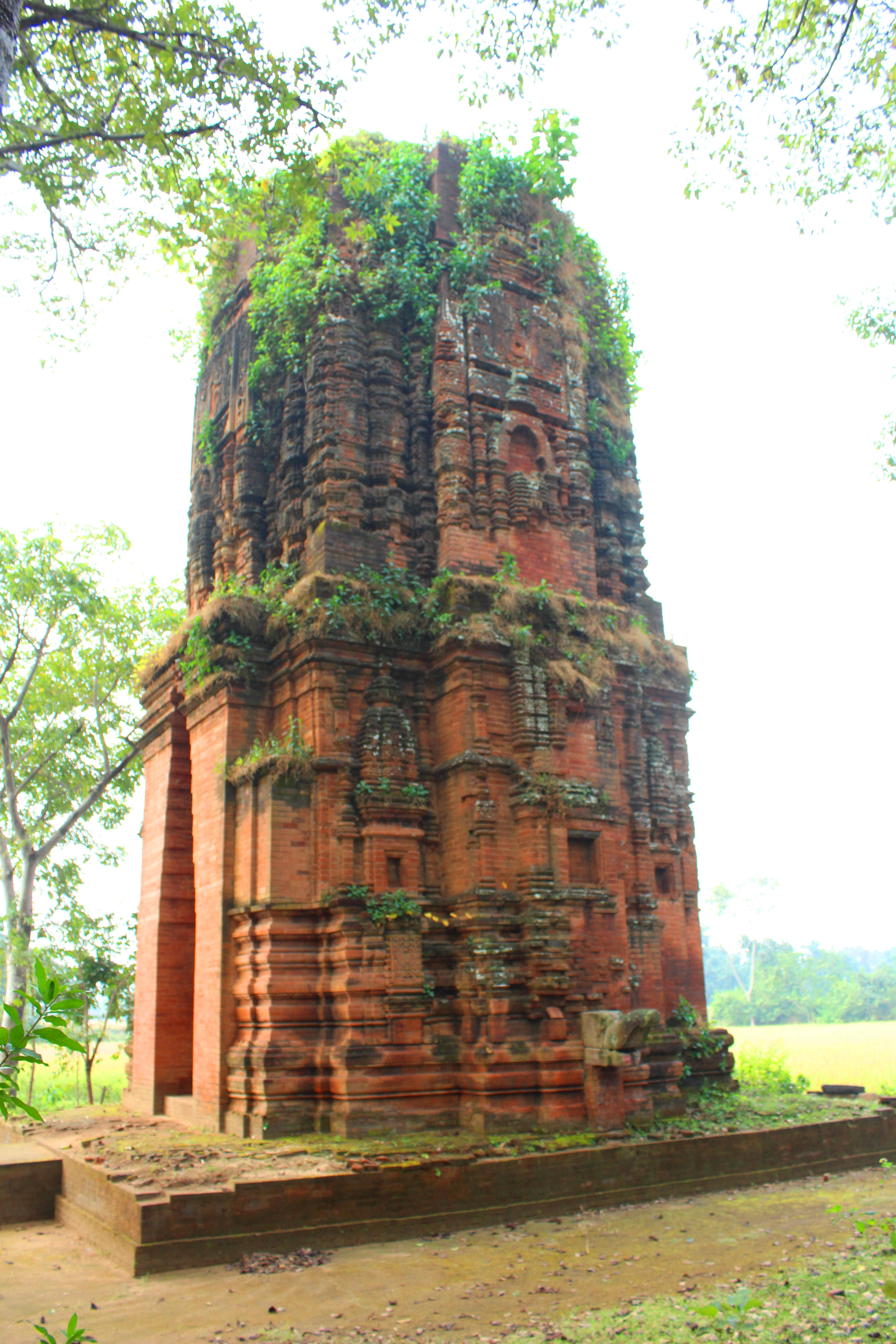
The second deul

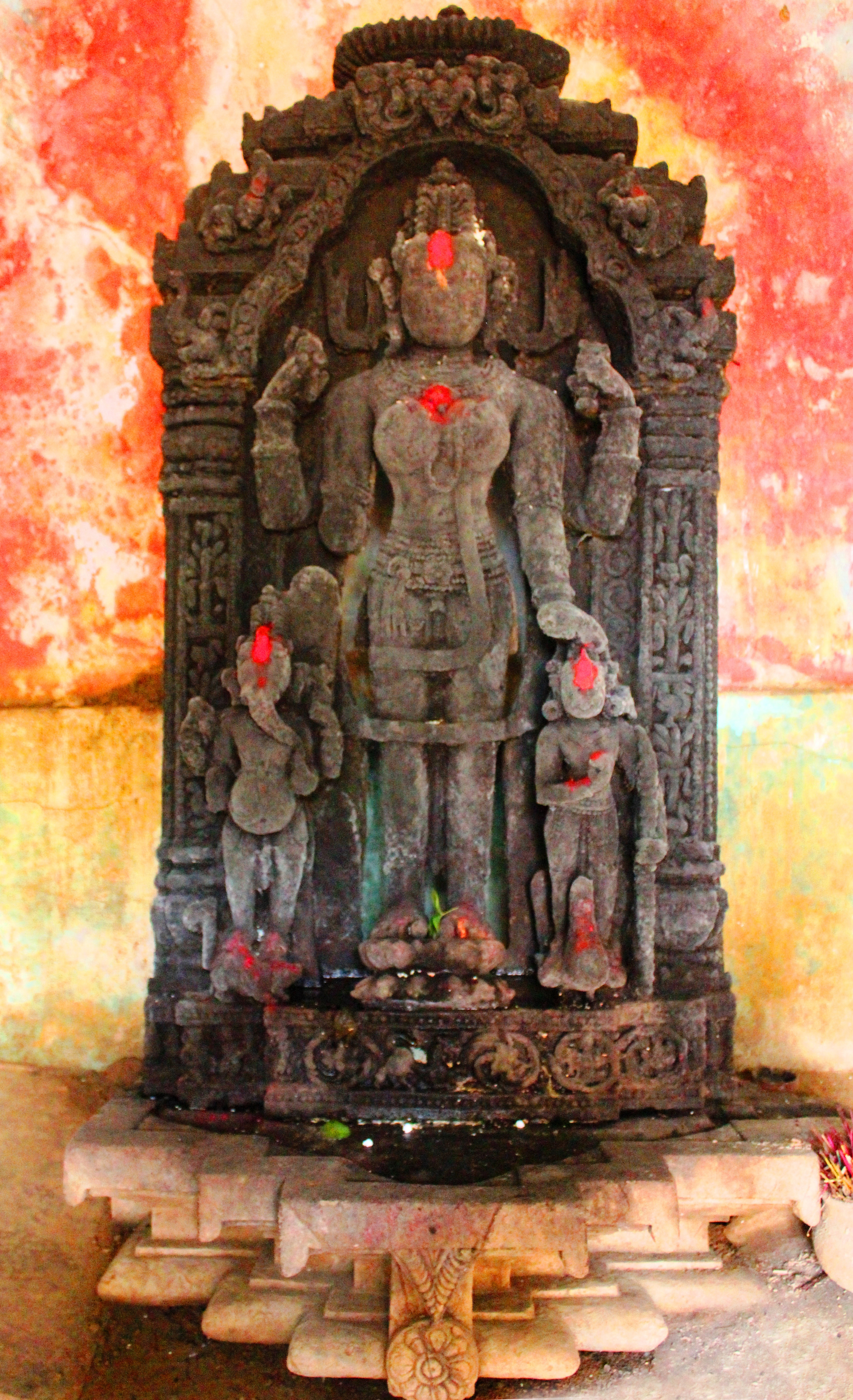
Goddess Durga

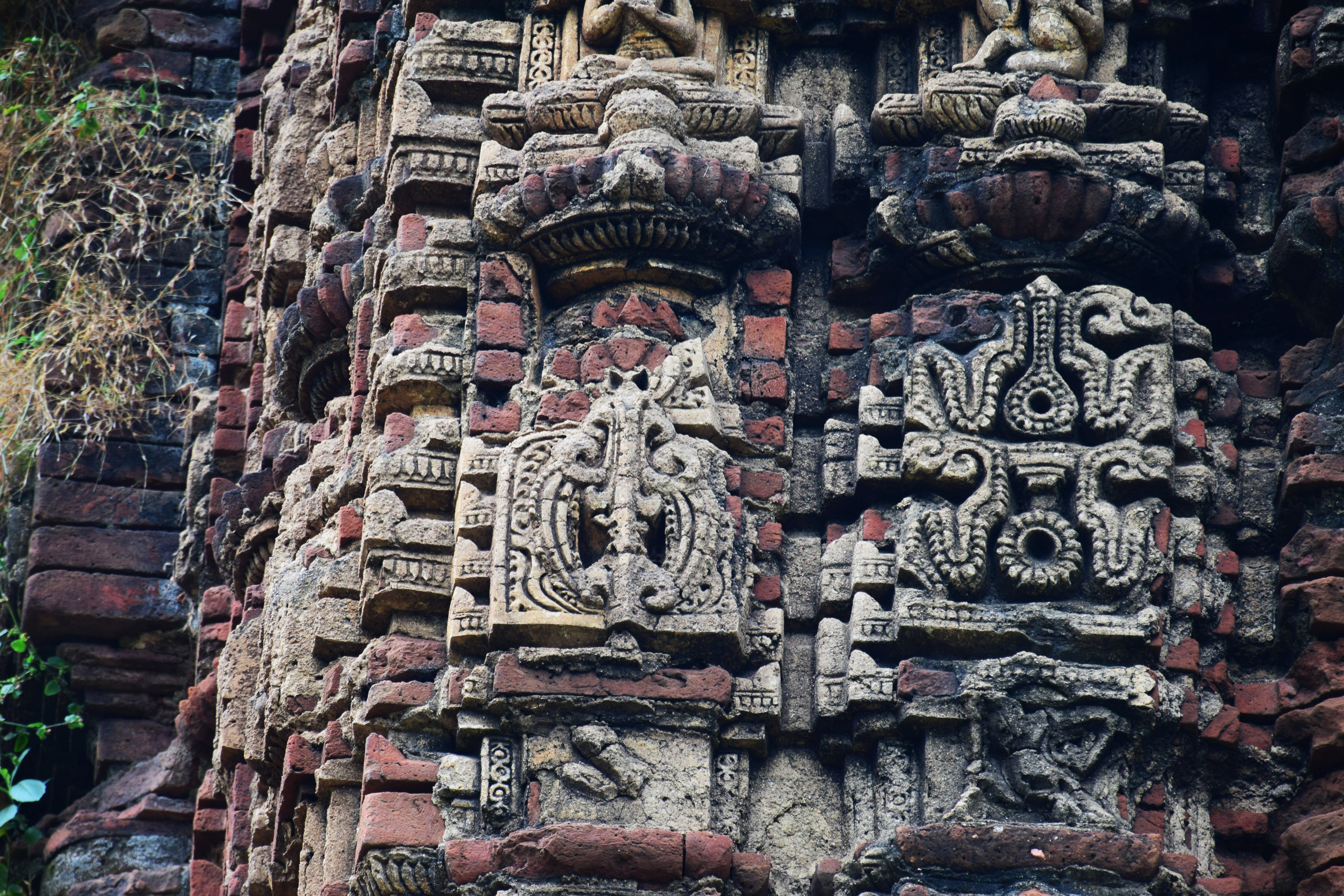
Decorated wall

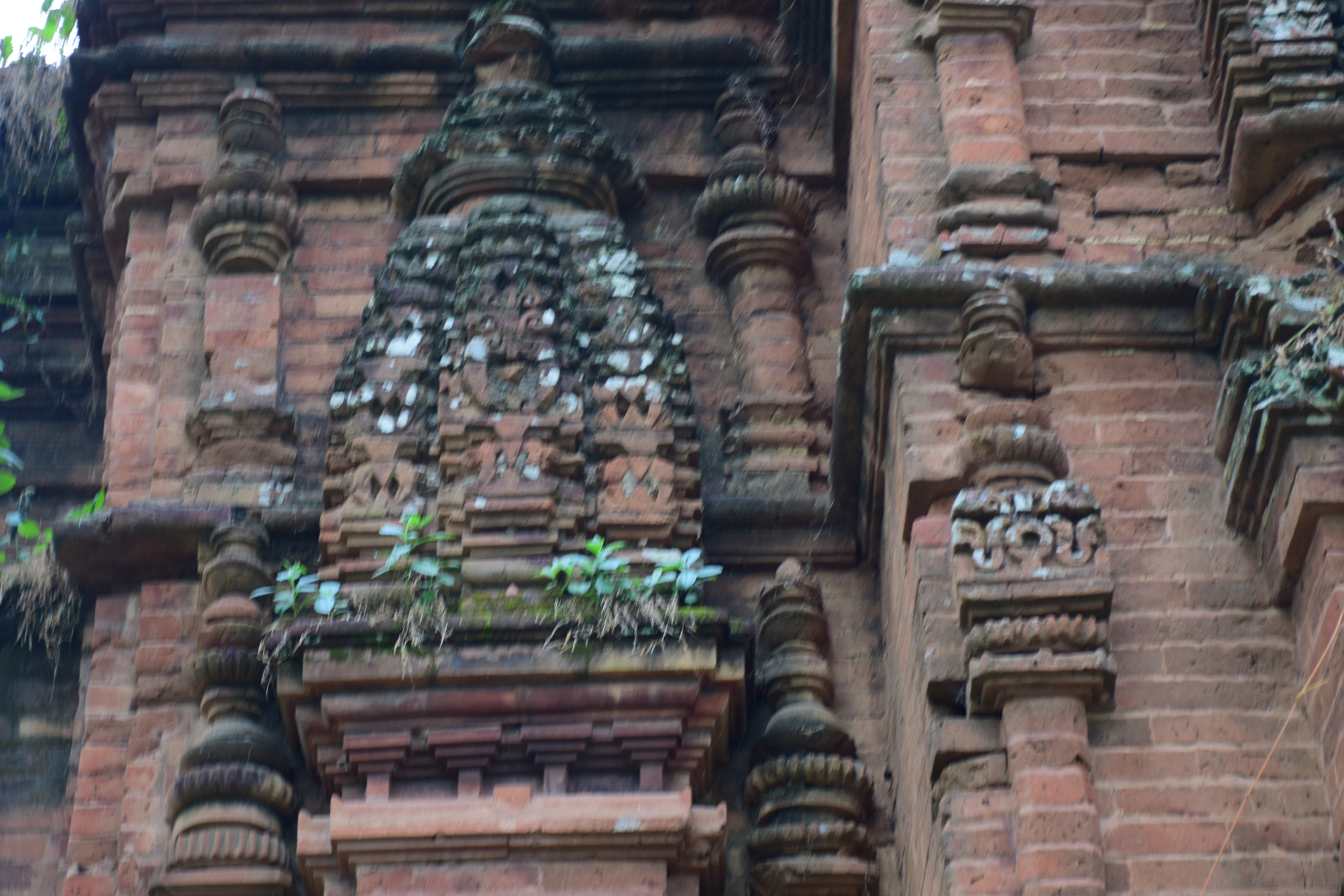
Decorated wall
