= Masagram =

- Village
- Location in West Bengal, India Masagram (India)
- Coordinates: 23.1383868°N 88.0307007°E
- Country: India
- State: West Bengal
- District: Purba Bardhaman

Government
  - Type: Panchayati raj (India)
  - Body: Gram panchayat

Population (2011)
  - Total: 4,310

Languages
  - Official: Bengali, English
- Time zone: UTC+5:30 (IST)
- PIN: 713401
- Vehicle registration: WB
- Website: purbabardhaman.gov.in

Masagram is a village in Ajhapur gram panchayat of Jamalpur CD block in Bardhaman Sadar South subdivision of Purba Bardhaman district in the Indian state of West Bengal.

== Geography ==
Cities and towns in the Bardhaman Sadar South subdivision of Purba Bardhaman district
M: municipal city/ town, CT: census town, R: rural/ urban centre, H: historical/ religious centre.
Owing to space constraints in the small map, the actual locations in a larger map may vary slightly

=== Location ===
Masagram is located at 23°08′18″N 88°01′51″E.

It is located near the banks of the Damodar River. It is around 7 kilometres (4.3 mi) south of Palsit and 12 kilometres (7.5 mi) from Saktigarh.

=== Urbanisation ===
95.54% of the population of Bardhaman Sadar South subdivision live in the rural areas. Only 4.46% of the population live in the urban areas, and that is the lowest proportion of urban population amongst the four subdivisions in Purba Bardhaman district. The map alongside presents some of the notable locations in the subdivision. All places marked in the map are linked in the larger full screen map.

== Demographics ==
As per the 2011 Census of India, Masagram had a total population of 4,310 of which 2,157 (50%) were males and 2,153 (50%) were females. Population in the age range of 0-6 years was 433. The total number of literates in Masagram was 2,812 (72.53% of the population 7 years and above).

== Transport ==
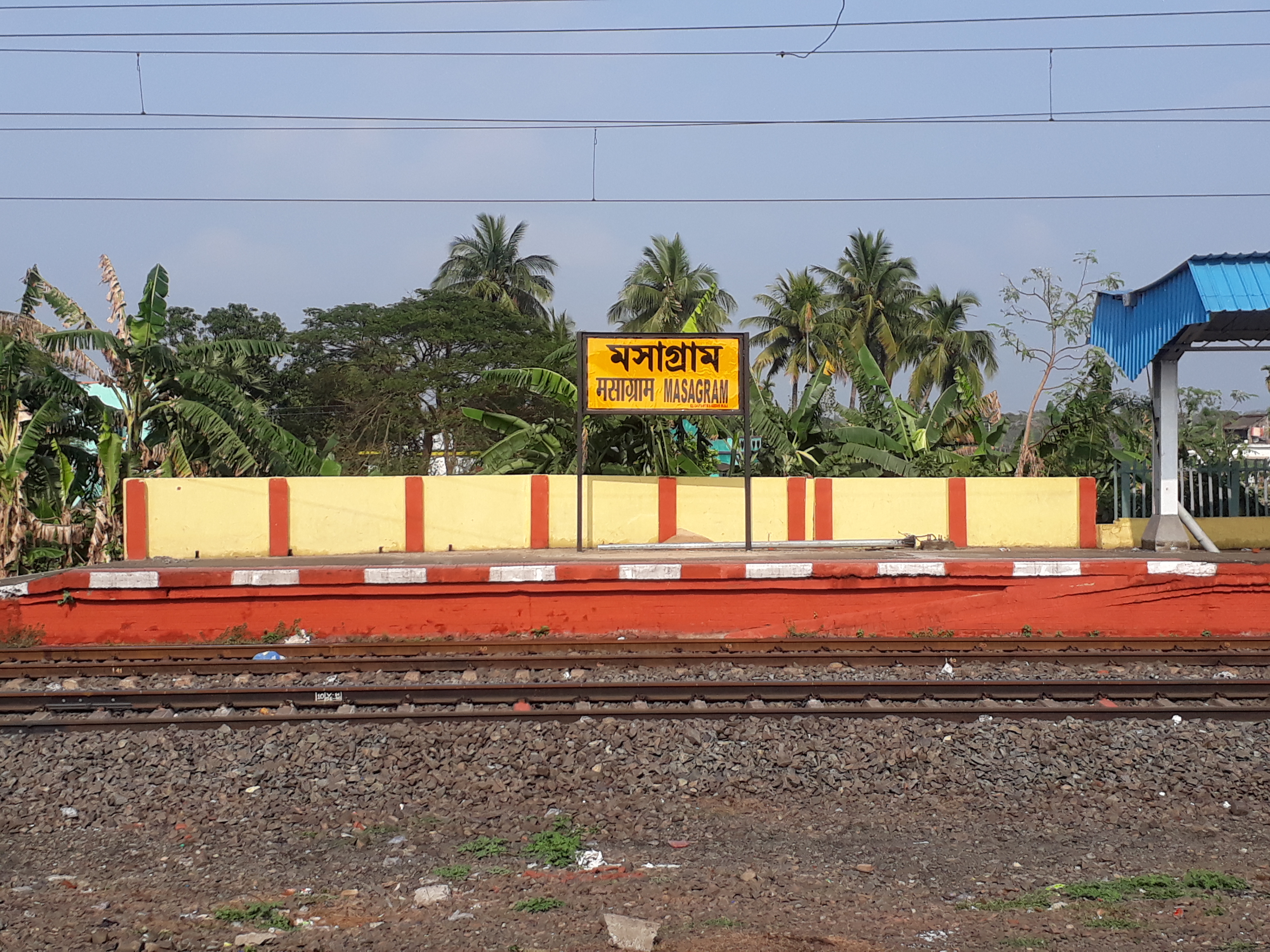
Masagram Junction railway station

Masagram railway station is 23 kilometres (14 mi) from Bardhaman Junction railway station and 72 kilometres (45 mi) from Howrah Station on the Howrah-Bardhaman chord. As of January 2019, DEMU services are available on the Bankura-Masagram line between Bankura and Masagram. There is a station at Gram Masagaram.

It is located off National Highway 19 and State Highway 15 links it to Memari on Grand Trunk Road.

== Education ==
Masagram High School is a coeducational high school affiliated with the West Bengal Board of Secondary Education.

== Culture ==
Masagram celebrates the Gajan of Dharmathakur. Raksha Kali is worshipped with a newly made idol on the last Tuesday of the Bengali month of Vaisakha. There are nine Shiva temples built in different architectural styles.

David J. McCutchion mentions the 18th-century Praneswara temple and the octagonal temple with duplicated chala (curved roof) at Masagram.
