= Sonamukhi =

- town
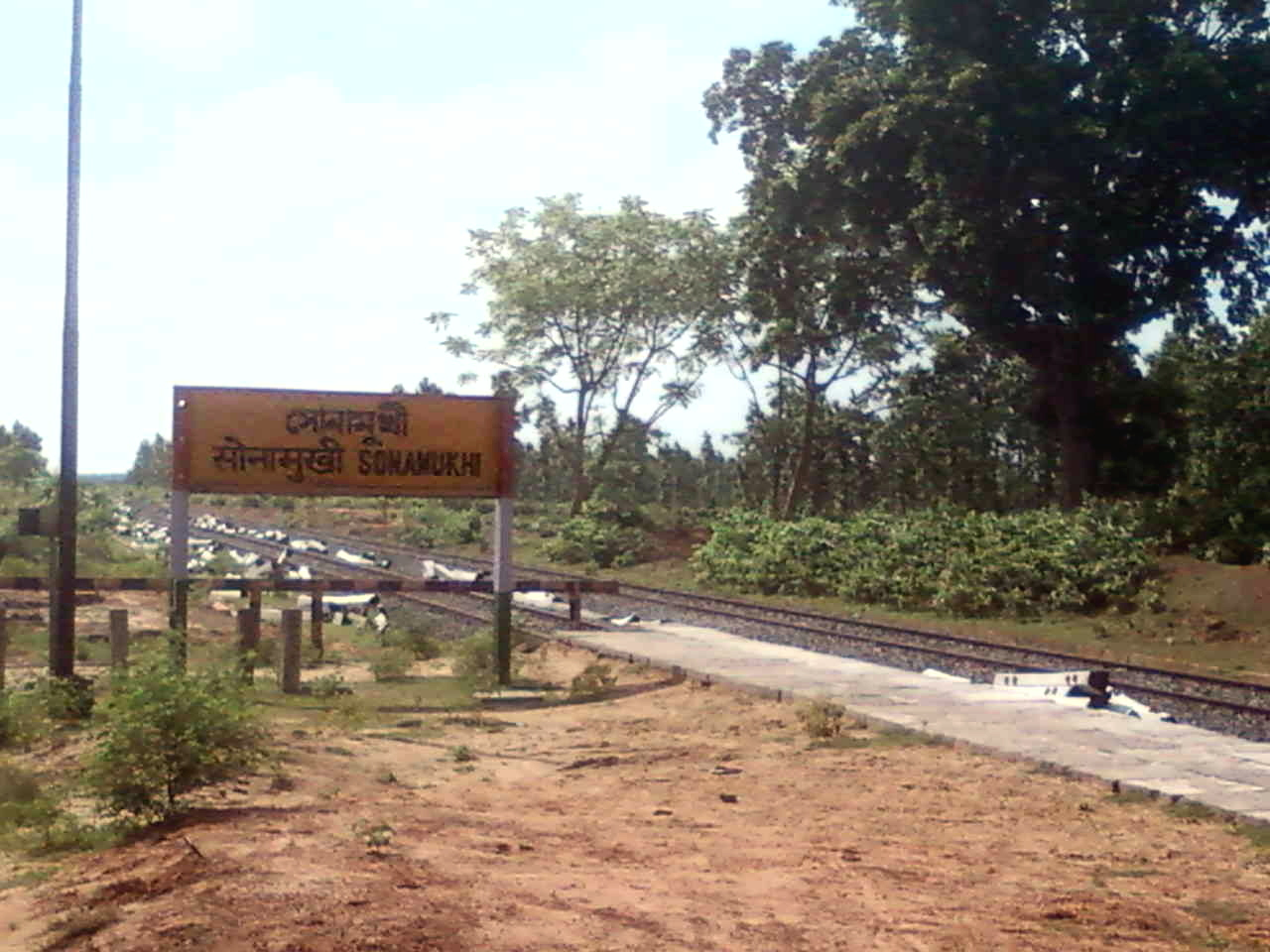
- Sonamukhi railway station

- Location in West Bengal, India Sonamukhi (India)
- Coordinates: 23.3°N 87.42°E
- Country: India
- State: West Bengal
- District: Bankura

Government
  - Type: Municipality
  - Body: Sonamukhi Municipality

Area
  - Total: 11.65 km^{2} (4.50 sq mi)
- Elevation: 66 m (217 ft)

Population (2011)
  - Total: 29,085
  - Density: 2,497/km^{2} (6,466/sq mi)

Languages
  - Official: Bengali, English
- Time zone: UTC+5:30 (IST)
- PIN: 722207
- Telephone code: 91 3244
- ISO 3166 code: IN-WB
- Lok Sabha constituency: Bishnupur
- Vidhan Sabha constituency: Sonamukhi
- Website: www.wbdma.gov.in/HTM/DIS/MUNI_ULB_Sonamukhi.htm

Sonamukhi is a town and a municipality in the Bishnupur subdivision of the Bankura district in the Indian state of West Bengal. It is famous for its Silk Saari and also Kali and Karthik puja .

== Geography ==
Places in Bishnupur subdivision in Bankura district
M: Municipal town, CT: census town, R: rural/ urban centre, T: ancient/ temple centre
Owing to space constraints in the small map, the actual locations in a larger map may vary slightly

=== Location ===
Sonamukhi is located at 23°18′N 87°25′E. It has an average elevation of 66 m (217 ft).

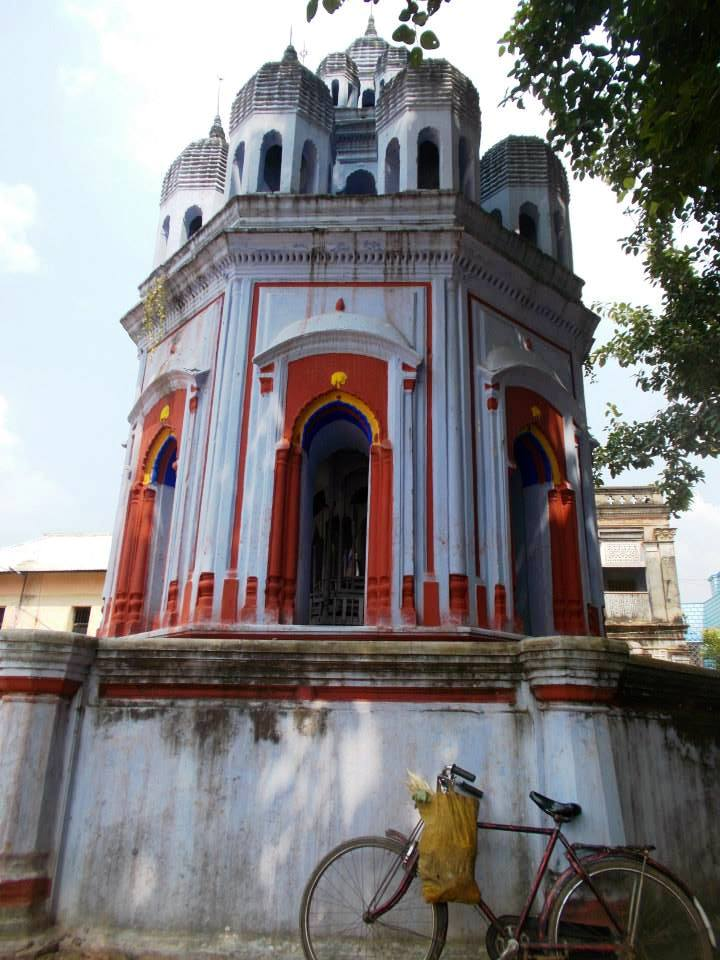
Sonamukhi Babupara Rashtola

=== Area overview ===
The map alongside shows the Bishnupur subdivision of Bankura district. Physiographically, this area has fertile low lying alluvial plains. It is a predominantly rural area with 90.06% of the population living in rural areas and only 8.94% living in the urban areas. It was a part of the core area of Mallabhum.

Note: The map alongside presents some of the notable locations in the subdivision. All places marked in the map are linked in the larger full screen map.

== History ==
Sonamukhi is a town of religious importance. There are many old temples throughout the town and a Mosque near Sonamukhi police station. Sonamukhi is the birthplace of Haranath Thakur and KusumKumari Devi. Sonamukhi also famous for temples made by terracotta art. one can find many temples showing a great form of terracotta, like Sridhar temple. They are the reincarnation of Gouranga also known as Chaitanya Mahaprabhu. This place is considered equal importance among devotees as that of places like Vrindavan and Nabadwip respective birthplace of Krishna and Chaitanya Mahaprabhu. This place is also noted for ancient Godashiv puja, which is located on Godashivtala (Satyapirtala). Besides the temple of "Kusumharanath" there other temples such as Manohar Das Thakur etc. Adjacent to the temple of Kusumharanath there is Ananta Kunda which water is sacred.

== Demographics ==
As of 2011 India census, Sonamukhi had a population of 29,085. Males constitute 51% of the population and females 49%. Sonamukhi has an average literacy rate of 86.25%, higher than state average of 76.26%.: male literacy is 92.22%, and female literacy is 79.90%. In Sonamukhi, 8.21% of the population is under 6 years of age.

== Civic administration ==
=== Police station ===
Sonamukhi police station has jurisdiction over Sonamukhi municipality and Sonamukhi CD block. The area covered is 380 km^{2} with a population of 142,305.

=== CD block HQ ===
The headquarters of Sonamukhi CD block are located at Sonamukhi.

== Transport ==
In September 2005, South Eastern Railway began passenger services on the 41 km (25 mi) Bankura-Sonamukhi broad gauge section, being the first phase of the Bankura-Damodar River Railway project. BDR project reduced the distance from Bankura to Howrah via Masagram, providing alternate connectivity to Howrah through Eastern Railway via Howrah–Bardhaman chord. Work up to Masagram including Sonamukhi railway station is completed and inaugurated on 16 April 2013.

State Highway 8 running from Santaldih (in Purulia district) to Majhdia (in Nadia district) passes through Sonamukhi.

== Education ==
Sonamukhi College was established in 1966. Affiliated with Bankura University, it offers honours courses in Bengali, Sanskrit, English, political science, history, philosophy, economics, geography, accountancy, physics, chemistry, mathematics, botany, zoology, computer science and general courses in arts, science and commerce.

Sonamukhi BJ High School is a Bengali-medium coeducational institution established in 1887. It has facilities for teaching from class V to class XII. The school has 13 computers, a library with 1,100 books and a playground.

Sonamukhi Girls High School is a Bengali-medium girls only institution established in 1887. It has facilities for teaching from class V to class XII. The school has 13 computers, a library with 435 books and a playground.

Sonamukhi BC Boys High School is a Bengali-medium boys only institution established in 1962. It has facilities for teaching from class V to class XII. The school has a library with 2,359 books.

The famous Primary school here is the Kumarbrata Memorial KG School. Which has produced many students who won state and national awards.

== Healthcare ==
Sonamukhi Rural Hospital, with 30 beds at Sonamukhi, is the major government medical facility in the Sonamukhi CD block. There are primary health centres at Dhulai (Gopikantapur) (with 6 beds), Panchal (with 6 beds), Kundu Pushkarini (with 10 beds) and Sitaljhore (with 6 beds).
