= West Bengal Centralised Admission Portal =

Government portal, India

West Bengal Centralised Admission Portal (WBCAP)
- Country: India
- Ministry: Department of Higher Education (West Bengal); Government of West Bengal
- Key people: Shri Jagannath Chattopadhyay, Minister-In-Charge, Dept. of Higher Education, Govt. of West Bengal
- Launched: 19 June 2024; 2 years ago
- Status: Active
- Website: wbcap.in

West Bengal Centralised Admission Portal is a single-window online platform for admission to 17 Universities and 400 Government and Government-aided affiliated Colleges, for pursuing Undergraduate courses will be conducted through this portal.

== About ==
West Bengal Centralised Admission Portal is a portal, for the students, who recently completed their higher secondary education and willing for higher education, can admit in any colleges and universities situated in West Bengal.

Some autonomous colleges and Universities are excluded from the Centralised Admission Portal.

== Admission process ==
Any student who has qualified (10+2) or equivalent examination from any recognised Board/Council/Equivalent body can get admission through this portal. Admission through WBCAP for the academic session 2024-2025 started on June 24.

Candidates can apply through three basic steps:

- Creating profile in WBCAP portal
- Filling the application form and choosing eligible courses and programmes
- Submit your details and save the form.

== Impact ==
The introduction of WBCAP has been largely welcomed as it addresses long-standing issues in the college admission process. It ensures that students have a fair opportunity to secure seats in their desired institutions without the hassles of multiple admissions or refunds. The portal's first use during the 2024-2025 academic year saw a smooth implementation, with thousands of students enrolling through this system.
