= Masagram railway station =

Railway station in West Bengal, India

Masagram মসাগ্রাম
- Masagram Jn railway station

General information
- Location: National Highway 2, Masagram, Purba Bardhaman district, West Bengal; India
- Coordinates: 23°08′09″N 88°02′32″E
- Elevation: 24.00 metres (78.74 ft)
- System: Indian Railways; Kolkata Suburban Railway
- Owner: Indian Railways
- Operator: Eastern Railway
- Lines: Howrah–Bardhaman chord Bankura–Masagram line
- Platforms: 7

Construction
- Structure type: Standard (on-ground station)
- Parking: No
- Cycle facilities: Yes

Other information
- Status: Functioning
- Station code: MSAE
- Division(s): Howrah

History
- Opened: 1917
- Electrified: 1964–66
- Former names: East Indian Railway Company

Services
Preceding station	Indian Railways	Following station
Mustaphachak towards Bankura Junction	South Eastern Railway zone Bankura–Masagram line	Terminus
Preceding station	Kolkata Suburban Railway	Following station
Nabagram towards Howrah Junction	Eastern Line Chord line	Chanchai towards Barddhaman Junction
Route map
Location
- Location within West Bengal Location within India

Masagram is a Kolkata Suburban Railway station on the Howrah–Bardhaman chord and is located in Purba Bardhaman district in the Indian state of West Bengal. It serves Masagram and surrounding villages. The construction of the Bankura–Masagram line made Masagram a junction station. The Damodar flows nearby.

== History ==
The Howrah–Bardhaman chord, a shorter link to Bardhaman from Howrah than the Howrah–Bardhaman main line, was constructed in 1917.

== Electrification ==
Howrah–Bardhaman chord was electrified in 1964–66.

== Passengers ==
Around 3,000 passengers use Masagram railway station every day.

== Bankura Masagram line ==
The 117-kilometre-long (73 mi) Bankura–Masagram line will connect to the Howrah–Bardhaman chord near Masagram. The 510-metre-long (1,670 ft) bridge over the Damodar has already been constructed, and work on the last sector, the Mathnasipur-Masagram new line project, was inaugurated on 16 April 2013.
