= Bankura–Masagram line =

Railway line in India

Bankura–Masagram line

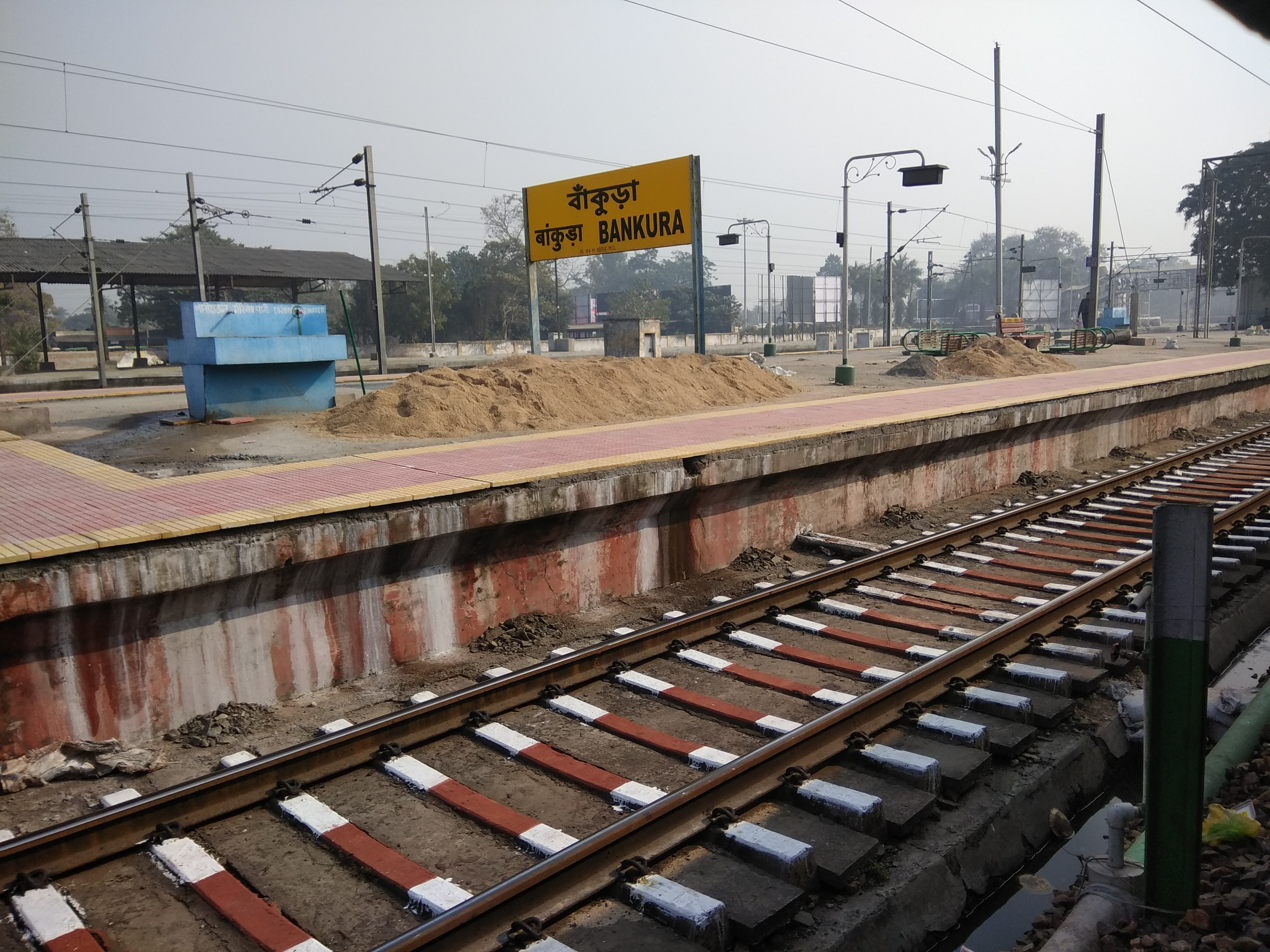
- Bankura Junction is an important railway station at Bankura–Masagram line

Overview
- Status: Operational (Electrified )
- Owner: Indian Railways
- Locale: West Bengal
- Termini: Bankura Junction; Masagram Junction
- Stations: 22

Service
- Operator(s): South Eastern Railway

History
- Opened: 2005 (as broad-gauge railway)
- Closed: 1965 (as Bakura-Damodar Railway)

Technical
- Line length: Broad gauge: 120.3 km (75 mi)
- Track length: Broad gauge: 120.3 km (75 mi)
- Track gauge: 5 ft 6 in (1,676 mm) broad gauge
- Old gauge: 2 ft 6 in (762 mm) Narrow gauge
- Electrification: Overhead catenary (25 kV) from 15 January 2020
- Operating speed: 100 km/h

The Bankura–Masagram line is an electrified broad-gauge rail line connecting Bankura town and Masagram. The 120.3-kilometre-long (74.8 mi) railway line operates in Bankura and Purba Bardhaman districts in the Indian state of West Bengal. It falls under Adra railway division of South Eastern Railway Zone of Indian Railways.

== History ==
The old 97.3 km (60 mi)Narrow Gauge route of Bankura Damodar Railway(closed in 1965) was planned to be revived by South Eastern Railway of Indian Railways in 1998 as a Broad Gauge line. The plans were to convert the old track with some minor diversions to a broad-gauge one and connect it with the Howrah–Bardhaman chord near Masagram. The work has been scheduled to be completed in three phases: Bankura–Sonamukhi, Sonamukhi–Rainagar, and Rainagar–Masagram.

The 41.4-kilometre-long (25.7 mi) Bankura–Sonamukhi broad-gauge section was completed and opened to the public in 2005. The 55-kilometre-long (34 mi) Sonamukhi–Rainagar broad-gauge section was completed and opened to the public in 2008 and one stop extension to Mathnasipur was completed in 2011. According to Indian Railways, the missing link between Mathnasipur and Masagram was planned to open in the financial year 2012–2013. On completion of the 23-kilometre-long (14 mi) Rainagar–Masagram new broad-gauge section, the distance between Howrah and Bankura was to be reduced from 231 kilometres (144 mi) (via Kharagpur) to 185 kilometres (115 mi). The last section involved the construction of a bridge across the Damodar River. The 1,444-metre-long (4,738 ft) bridge over the Damodar was constructed and work on the Mathnasipur-Masagram new project was completed with the addition of four new halts – Gram Masagram (Mustafachak), Habaspur, Dadpur and Berugram.

Construction on the 48.25-kilometre-long (29.98 mi) new broad-gauge railway line between Bankura–Chhatna–Mukutmanipur has also been inaugurated.

=== Route description ===
The previous 2 ft 6 in (762 mm) Narrow gauge line near Bankura was a bit different. The former NG station was physically isolated from the BG station. It was after the adjacent road, so if anyone wanted to change from BG to NG, he/she should cross the road to entrain the NG train. To continuing journey from Adra to Rainagar, the new 5 ft 6 in (1,676 mm) broad gauge line is branching just before Bankura Jn. (going towards Kharagpur from Adra), then it turns as a semicircle, and then meets on the old narrow-gauge line alignment. On the rest portion it completely follows the old line's alignment. The line is entirely single. There are crossings at Sonamukhi, Patrasayer, Bowaichandi, Seharabazar and Rainagar. It passes through land of red soil and part of a partly cut jungle.

== Train service ==
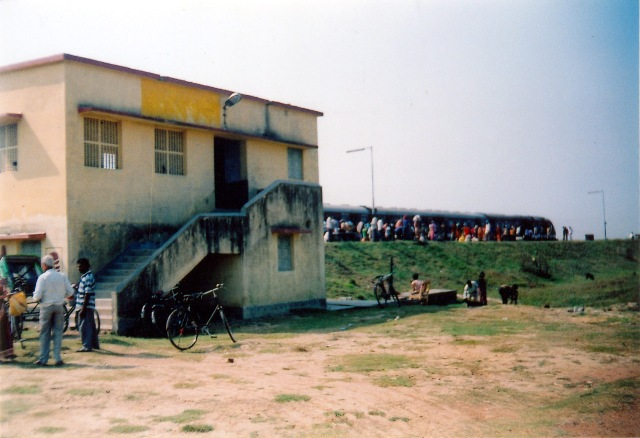
The Rainagar broad-gauge station of Bankura–Masagram line built in place of old narrow-gauge terminus station of BDR. It is built with special elevation keeping in view of flooding of Damodar River in monsoons.

As of April 2021, MEMU services are available between Bankura Junction and Masagram Junction.

On 20 February 2021, South Eastern Railway has decided to introduce two pairs of MEMU trains between Bankura and Masagram from 21 February 2021.

On 28 June 2025, Ashwini Vaishnaw, The Minister of Railways, inaugurated MEMU Train between Purulia Junction and Howrah Junction via Bankura Junction and Masagram Junction.

== See also ==
- Bankura Damodar Railway
