= List of villages in Purba Bardhaman district =

This is an alphabetical list of villages in Purba Bardhaman district, West Bengal, India.

== A–C ==
- Abujhati
- Adrahati
- Akhina
- Amarpur
- Amarun
- Ambana
- Amgoria
- Amrargar
- Amur
- Aogram
- Arjjunpur
- Arra
- Atgharia
- Ausgram

Ref for Ausgram

== B ==
- Badla
- Badulia
- Bagabanpur
- Bagbati
- Baidyapur
- Balgana
- Balgona
- Balsidanga
- Bamshore
- Bamunapara
- Bamunara
- Bamungram
- Bankapasi
- Banpash
- Bara Belun
- Barshul
- Belenda
- Bharatpur
- Bhatakul
- Bhatar
- Bhimsara
- Bhuyera
- Bigra
- Bononabagram

Ref for Bharatpur

== C–F ==
- Chak Khandajuli
- Chak Tentul
- Chandra
- Chandrapur
- Channa village
- Choto Meigachi
- Darbeshpur
- Debipur
- Dihipalashan
- Dharmapura
- Dwariapur
- Erachya
- Eruar
- Fatepur

== G–J ==
- Galsi
- Gangatikuri
- Ghagra
- Ghanshyampur
- Gholada
- Gonna Serandi
- Gotan
- Gramdihi
- Guir
- Hanrgram
- Hapania
- Haribati
- Hasanhati
- Hatgobindapur
- Jajigram
- Jamalpur
- Jamtara
- Jaugram
- Jhamatpur
- Jhapandanga
- Jharul
- Jhikardanga
- Jhujkadanga

== K ==
* Kachgaria
- Kaigram
- Kamargoria
- Kamnara
- Kandorsona
- Kandra
- Karjjana
- Karui
- Kasba
- Kendur
- Ketugram
- Khandaghosh
- Kherur
- Kogram
- Kondaipur
- Kora
- Korakdal
- Kshirgram
- Kshetia
- Kuara
- Kulingram
- Kumarun
- Kumirkola
- Kurmun
- Kusumgram
- Kubajpur

== L–N ==
- Lakhuria
- Lohai
- Madhabdihi
- Mahata
- Maheshbati
- Majida
- Majigram
- Mankar
- Masagram
- Mongalkote
- Monteswar
- Muidhara
- Nabagram
- Nadanghat
- Naopara
- Narayanpur
- Narjja
- Nasigram
- Nityanandapur
- Nutanhat

== O–R ==
- Okersa
- Orgram
- Painta
- Pahalanpur
- Paharhati
- Palitpur
- Panchkula
- Parulia
- Patuli
- Purbasthali
- Pursha
- Putsuri
- Raina
- Rajipur
- Ramchandrapur
- Ramgopalpur
- Randiha
- Rangapara
- Rasulpur
- Ratanpur
- Routhgram

== S ==
- Sagrai
- Salkuni
- Salun
- Samudragarh
- Sankari
- Santoshpur
- Selenda
- Shillya
- Shunur
- Shyamsundar
- Silakot
- Singi
- Singarkone
- Singot
- Sodepur
- Sonchalida
- Sotkhali
- Sribati
- Srikhanda
- Subaldaha
- Sujapur
- Sundalpur

== T–Z ==
- Tulsidanga
- Uchalan
- Uchchagram
- Udaypur
- Uddharanpur
- Ukhrid
- Usha
