= Santoshpur, Purba Bardhaman =

Santoshpur
- Village
- Location in West Bengal, India Santoshpur (India)
- Coordinates: 23°28′33.3″N 87°55′39.0″E
- Country: India
- State: West Bengal
- District: Purba Bardhaman
  - Rank: 1,963

Languages
  - Official: Bengali, English
- Time zone: UTC+5:30 (IST)
- PIN: 713125
- Telephone/STD code: 0342
- Lok Sabha constituency: Bardhaman-Durgapur
- Vidhan Sabha constituency: Bhatar
- Website: purbabardhaman.gov.in

Santoshpur is a village in Bhatar, a community development block in Bardhaman Sadar North subdivision of Purba Bardhaman district in the state of West Bengal, India.

== Demographics ==
The area is 239.14 hectares (590.9 acres) and the population is 1,963, in approximately 473 houses. The nearest village, Ratanpur, is approximately 2 km away.

Particulars	Total	Male	Female
Total no. of houses	473	-	-
Population	1,963	1,010	953
Child (0–6)	222	106	109
Schedule Caste	446	221	225
Schedule Tribe	2	1	1
