= Ramchandrapur, Purba Bardhaman =

Ramchandrapur
- Village
- Location in West Bengal, India Ramchandrapur (India)
- Coordinates: 23°15′10.4″N 88°00′07.0″E
- Country: India
- State: West Bengal
- District: Purba Bardhaman
  - Rank: 3,221

Languages
  - Official: Bengali, English
- Time zone: UTC+5:30 (IST)
- PIN: 713125
- Telephone/STD code: 0342
- Lok Sabha constituency: Bardhaman-Durgapur
- Vidhan Sabha constituency: Bhatar
- Website: purbabardhaman.gov.in

Ramchandrapur is a village in Bhatar, a CD block in Bardhaman Sadar North subdivision of Purba Bardhaman district in the state of West Bengal, India.

== Demographics ==
The village has an area of 451.89 hectares (1,116.6 acres) and a population of 3,221 in about 762 houses. Ratanpur, the nearest village, is approximately 2 km away.

Particulars	Total	Male	Female
Total no. of houses	762	-	-
Population	3,221	1,604	1,617
Child (0–6)	304	161	143
Schedule Caste	1,609	797	812
Schedule Tribe	41	19	22
