= Salun =

- Village
- Location in West Bengal, India Salun (India)
- Coordinates: 23°28′33.3″N 87°55′39.0″E
- Country: India
- State: West Bengal
- District: Purba Bardhaman
  - Rank: 1,246

Languages
  - Official: Bengali, English
- Time zone: UTC+5:30 (IST)
- PIN: 713165
- Telephone/STD code: 0342
- Lok Sabha constituency: Bardhaman-Durgapur
- Vidhan Sabha constituency: Bhatar
- Website: purbabardhaman.gov.in

Salun is a village in Bhatar, a Community development block in Bardhaman Sadar North subdivision of Purba Bardhaman district in the state of West Bengal, India.

== Demographics ==
The area of the village is 114.84 hectares and the population in 2011 was 1,246. Ratanpur, the nearest village, is approximately 2 km away.

Particulars	Total	Male	Female
Total no. of houses	297	-	-
Population	1,246	636	610
Child (0–6)	98	49	49
Schedule Caste	214	105	109
Schedule Tribe	0	0	0
