= Banpash =

Banpas
- Village
- Location in West Bengal, India Banpas (India)
- Coordinates: 23°22′58.1″N 87°48′32.2″E
- Country: India
- State: West Bengal
- District: Purba Bardhaman

Population (2011)
  - Total: 1,340

Languages
  - Official: Bengali, English
- Time zone: UTC+5:30 (IST)
- PIN: 713141
- Telephone/STD code: 0342
- Lok Sabha constituency: Bardhaman-Durgapur
- Vidhan Sabha constituency: Bhatar
- Website: purbabardhaman.gov.in

Banpash is a village in Bhatar, a Community development block in Bardhaman Sadar North subdivision of Purba Bardhaman district in the state of West Bengal, India.

== Demographics ==
The total geographic area of village is 701.74 hectares. Banpash features a total population of 6,702 peoples. There are about 1,649 houses in Balsidanga village.

== Population and house data ==
Particulars	Total	Male	Female
Total no. of houses	1,649	-	-
Population	6,702	3,392	3,310
Child (0–6)	655	314	341
Schedule Caste	2213	1,131	1;082
Schedule Tribe	323	153	170
Literacy	77.96 %	82.02 %	71.67 %
