= Sayed Md Masih =

West Bengal politician

Sayed Mohammad Masih

Member of West Bengal Legislative Assembly
- In office 2006–2011
- Prime Minister: Buddhadeb Bhattacharjee
- Preceded by: Subhas Mondal
- Succeeded by: Banamali Hazra
- Constituency: Bhatar
- In office 1982–1991
- Prime Minister: Jyoti Basu
- Preceded by: Bholanath Sen
- Succeeded by: Mahboob Zahedi

Personal details
- Born: 1944 (age 81–82) Bhatar, Bardhaman district, Bengal Presidency
- Party: Communist Party of India (Marxist)

Sayed Mohammad Masih is an Indian politician belonging to the Communist Party of India (Marxist). He was the MLA of Bhatar Assembly constituency in the West Bengal Legislative Assembly.

== Early life and family ==
Masih was born in c. 1944 to a Bengali family of Muslim Syeds in Bhatar, Bardhaman district, Bengal Presidency. He was the son of Sayed Mohammad Taha.

== Career ==
Masih contested in the 1982 West Bengal Legislative Assembly election where he ran as a Communist Party of India (Marxist) candidate for Bhatar Assembly constituency. He was re-elected from the same constituency at the 1987 West Bengal Legislative Assembly election, and 2006 West Bengal Legislative Assembly election for a third term.
