= Bamshore =

- Village
- Location in West Bengal, India Bamshore (India)
- Coordinates: 23.4357°N 87.9046°E
- Country: India
- State: West Bengal
- District: Purba Bardhaman

Population (2011)
  - Total: 7,997

Languages
  - Official: Bengali, English
- Time zone: UTC+5:30 (IST)
- Telephone/STD code: 0342
- Lok Sabha constituency: Bardhaman-Durgapur
- Vidhan Sabha constituency: Bhatar
- Website: purbabardhaman.gov.in

Bamshore is a village in Bhatar CD Block in Bardhaman Sadar North subdivision of Purba Bardhaman district in West Bengal, India.

== Geography ==
It is 30 km away from Bardhaman. It has a post office. In this village there are two mosques and three mandirs.

== Demographics ==
As per the 2011 Census of India Bamshor had a total population of 7,997 of which 4,097 (51%) were males and 3,900 (49%) were females. Population below 6 years was 988. The total number of literates in Bamshor was 5,082 (72.51% of the population over 6 years).

== Transport ==
It is situated at the side of Bardhaman -Baharampur that is Badshahi Road.

== Education ==
It has a higher secondary school - Bamshore High School near Bhatar and two primary schools.
