= Selenda =

- Village
- Location in West Bengal, India Selenda (India)
- Coordinates: 23°26′53.5″N 88°00′07.1″E
- Country: India
- State: West Bengal
- District: Purba Bardhaman
  - Rank: 2,053

Languages
  - Official: Bengali, English
- Time zone: UTC+5:30 (IST)
- PIN: 713125
- Telephone/STD code: 0342
- Lok Sabha constituency: Bardhaman-Durgapur
- Vidhan Sabha constituency: Bhatar
- Website: purbabardhaman.gov.in

Selenda is a village in Bhatar, a CD block in Bardhaman Sadar North subdivision of Purba Bardhaman district in the state of West Bengal, India.

== Demographics ==
The village's area is 322.29 hectares (796.4 acres) and the population is 2,053. There are about 428 houses. Ratanpur, the nearest village, is approximately 2 km away.

Particulars	Total	Male	Female
Total no. of houses	428	-	-
Population	2,053	1,035	1,018
Child (0–6)	213	106	107
Schedule Caste	580	301	279
Schedule Tribe	140	64	76
