= Salkuni =

- Village
- Location in West Bengal, India Salkuni (India)
- Coordinates: 23°26′50.6″N 87°47′57.5″E
- Country: India
- State: West Bengal
- District: Purba Bardhaman
  - Rank: 1,740

Languages
  - Official: Bengali, English
- Time zone: UTC+5:30 (IST)
- PIN: 713121
- Telephone/STD code: 0342
- Lok Sabha constituency: Bardhaman-Durgapur
- Vidhan Sabha constituency: Bhatar
- Website: purbabardhaman.gov.in

Salkuni is a village in Bhatar CD block in Bardhaman Sadar North subdivision of Purba Bardhaman district in the state of West Bengal, India.

== Demographics ==
The area of village is 252.63 hectares (624.3 acres) and the population is 1,740. There are about 402 houses in Salkuni. Ratanpur, the nearest village, is approximately 2 km away.

Particulars	Total	Male	Female
Total no. of houses	297	-	-
Population	1,246	636	610
Child (0–6)	98	49	49
Schedule Caste	214	105	109
Schedule Tribe	0	0	0
