= Bamunara, Purba Bardhaman =

Bamunara
- Village
- Location in West Bengal, India Bamunara (India)
- Coordinates: 23°25′02.9″N 87°51′26.7″E
- Country: India
- State: West Bengal
- District: Purba Bardhaman

Population (2011)
  - Total: 2,051

Languages
  - Official: Bengali, English
- Time zone: UTC+5:30 (IST)
- Lok Sabha constituency: Bardhaman-Durgapur
- Vidhan Sabha constituency: Bhatar
- Website: purbabardhaman.gov.in

Bamunara is a village in Bhatar, a Community development block in Bardhaman Sadar North subdivision of Purba Bardhaman district in the state of West Bengal, India.

== Demographics ==
The area of the village is 306.24 hectares and the population was 2,051 in 2011.

Particulars	Total	Male	Female
Total no. of houses	540	-	-
Population	2,051	1,065	986
Child (0–6)	256	141	115
Schedule Caste	876	466	410
Schedule Tribe	481	238	243
Literacy	57.55 %	65.91 %	48.68 %

== See also ==
- Kumarun
- Narayanpur
