= Belenda =

- Village
- Location in West Bengal, India Belenda (India)
- Coordinates: 23°23′30.5″N 87°55′13.6″E
- Country: India
- State: West Bengal
- District: Purba Bardhaman

Population (2011)
  - Total: 3,970

Languages
  - Official: Bengali; English
- Time zone: UTC+5:30 (IST)
- PIN: 713125
- Telephone/STD code: 0342
- Lok Sabha constituency: Bardhaman-Durgapur
- Vidhan Sabha constituency: Bhatar
- Website: purbabardhaman.gov.in

Belenda is a village in Bhatar, a community development block in Bardhaman Sadar North subdivision of Purba Bardhaman district in the state of West Bengal, India.

== Population ==
Scheduled Castes and Scheduled Tribes: Scheduled Castes constituted 19.80% and Scheduled Tribes 3.78% of the population in 2021.

Total no. of houses: 863
	Total	Male	Female
Population	3,970	2,030	1,940
Child (0–6)	459	230	229
Schedule Caste	786	397	389
Schedule Tribe	150	75	75

== See also ==
- Bhatar
