= Jhujkadanga =

- Village
- Location in West Bengal, India Jhujkadanga (India)
- Coordinates: 23°24′24.5″N 87°51′55.2″E
- Country: India
- State: West Bengal
- District: Purba Bardhaman
  - Rank: 855

Languages
  - Official: Bengali, English
- Time zone: UTC+5:30 (IST)
- PIN: 713125
- Telephone/STD code: 0342
- Lok Sabha constituency: Bardhaman-Durgapur
- Vidhan Sabha constituency: Bhatar
- Website: purbabardhaman.gov.in

Jhujkadanga is a village in Bhatar, a CD block in Bardhaman Sadar North subdivision of Purba Bardhaman district in the state of West Bengal, India. It is located about 27 kilometres (17 mi) from West Bengal on National Highway towards Purba Bardhaman.

== Population ==
Members of Scheduled Castes and Scheduled Tribes make up most of the population. Scheduled Tribes were 39.65% and Scheduled Castes 15.79% in 2011.

Particulars	Total	Male	Female
Total no. of houses	187	-	-
Population	855	415	440
Child (0–6)	111	40	71
Schedule Caste	135	68	67
Schedule Tribe	339	156	183
