= Erachya =

- Village
- Location in West Bengal, India Erachya (India)
- Coordinates: 23°21′26.6″N 87°57′34.1″E
- Country: India
- State: West Bengal
- District: Purba Bardhaman
  - Rank: 2,716

Languages
  - Official: Bengali, English
- Time zone: UTC+5:30 (IST)
- PIN: 713125
- Telephone/STD code: 0342
- Lok Sabha constituency: Bardhaman-Durgapur
- Vidhan Sabha constituency: Bhatar
- Website: purbabardhaman.gov.in

Erachya is a village in Bhatar CD block in Bardhaman Sadar North subdivision of Purba Bardhaman district in the state of West Bengal, India with 609 resident families. It is about 20 kilometres (12 mi) from West Bengal on National Highway towards Purba Bardhaman.

== Population ==
Scheduled Castes and Scheduled Tribes: Scheduled Castes constitute 25.41% and Scheduled Tribes 3.17% of the population.

Particulars	Total	Male	Female
Total no. of houses	609	–	–
Population	2,716	1,377	1,339
Child (0–6)	256	122	134
Schedule Caste	690	342	348
Schedule Tribe	86	47	39
