= Bara Belun =

BaraBelun Barabelun
- Village
- Barabelun
- Location in West Bengal, India BaraBelun (India)
- Coordinates: 23°24′10.8″N 87°58′30.5″E
- Country: India
- State: West Bengal
- District: Purba Bardhaman

Population (2011)
  - Total: 11,261

Languages
  - Official: Bengali, English
- Time zone: UTC+5:30 (IST)
- PIN: 713125
- Telephone/STD code: 0342
- Lok Sabha constituency: Bardhaman-Durgapur
- Vidhan Sabha constituency: Bhatar
- Website: purbabardhaman.gov.in

BaraBelun is a village in Bhatar, a community development block in Bardhaman Sadar North subdivision of Purba Bardhaman district in the state of West Bengal, India.

== Demographics ==
The area of the village is 1777 hectares and the population was 11,261 in 2011.

Particulars	Total	Male	Female
Total no. of houses	2,498	-	-
Population	11,261	5,705	5,556
Child (0–6)	1,148	591	557
Schedule Caste	4,163	2,085	2,078
Schedule Tribe	711	351	360
