= Gramdihi =

- Village
- Location in West Bengal, India Gramdihi (India)
- Coordinates: 23°24′43.3″N 87°47′28.8″E
- Country: India
- State: West Bengal
- District: Purba Bardhaman
  - Rank: 2,339

Languages
  - Official: Bengali, English
- Time zone: UTC+5:30 (IST)
- PIN: 713127
- Telephone/STD code: 0342
- Lok Sabha constituency: Bardhaman-Durgapur
- Vidhan Sabha constituency: Bhatar
- Website: purbabardhaman.gov.in

Gramdihi is a village in Bhatar, a Community development block in Bardhaman Sadar North subdivision of Purba Bardhaman district in the state of West Bengal, India.

== Population ==
Scheduled Castes and Scheduled Tribes: Scheduled Castes were 28.00% and Scheduled Tribes 7.78% of the population in 2011.

Particulars	Total	Male	Female
Total no. of houses	544	-	-
Population	2,339	1,172	1,167
Child (0–6)	291	143	148
Schedule Caste	655	327	328
Schedule Tribe	182	94	88
