= Mahata =

- Village
- Location in West Bengal, India Mahata (India)
- Coordinates: 23°29′00.5″N 87°48′14.9″E
- Country: India
- State: West Bengal
- District: Purba Bardhaman
  - Rank: 5,443

Languages
  - Official: Bengali, English
- Time zone: UTC+5:30 (IST)
- PIN: 713128
- Telephone/STD code: 0342
- Lok Sabha constituency: Bardhaman-Durgapur
- Vidhan Sabha constituency: Bhatar
- Website: purbabardhaman.gov.in

Mahata is a village in Bhatar, a community development block in Bardhaman Sadar North subdivision of Purba Bardhaman district in the state of West Bengal, India.

== Population ==
Scheduled Castes and Scheduled Tribes: Scheduled Castes constitute 32.35% and Scheduled Tribes 21.97% of the total population in Mahata village.

Particulars	Total	Male	Female
Total no. of houses	1,311	-	-
Population	5,443	2,737	2,706
Child (0–6)	628	299	329
Schedule Caste	1,761	889	872
Schedule Tribe	1,196	598	598
