= Kachgaria =

Village in West Bengal, India

- Village
- Country: India
- State: West Bengal
- District: Purba Bardhaman
  - Rank: 1,081

Languages
  - Official: Bengali, English
- Time zone: UTC+5:30 (IST)
- PIN: 713125
- Telephone/STD code: 0342
- Lok Sabha constituency: Bardhaman-Durgapur
- Vidhan Sabha constituency: Bhatar
- Website: purbabardhaman.gov.in

Kachgaria is a village in Bhatar, a community development block in Bardhaman Sadar North subdivision of Purba Bardhaman district in the state of West Bengal, India.

== Population ==
Members of Scheduled Castes were 35.15% of the population in 2011.

Particulars	Total	Male	Female
Total no. of houses	211	-	-
Population	1,081	553	528
Child (0–6)	109	57	52
Schedule Caste	380	195	185
Schedule Tribe	0	0	0
