= Kherur =

- Village
- Location in West Bengal, India Kherur (India)
- Coordinates: 23°28′41.7″N 87°50′41.9″E
- Country: India
- State: West Bengal
- District: Purba Bardhaman
  - Rank: 3,891

Languages
  - Official: Bengali, English
- Time zone: UTC+5:30 (IST)
- PIN: 713121
- Telephone/STD code: 0342
- Lok Sabha constituency: Bardhaman-Durgapur
- Vidhan Sabha constituency: Bhatar
- Website: purbabardhaman.gov.in

Kherur is a village in Bhatar CD block in Bardhaman Sadar North subdivision of Purba Bardhaman district in the state of West Bengal, India with total 877 families residing. It is located about 34 kilometres (21 mi) from West Bengal on National Highway towards Purba Bardhaman.

== Population ==
Most of the villagers are members of Scheduled Castes and Scheduled Tribes, with Scheduled Castes constituting 41.71% and Scheduled Tribes 17.58%.

Particulars	Total	Male	Female
Total No. of Houses	877	-	-
Population	3,891	1,960	1,931
Child (0-6)	470	223	247
Schedule Caste	1,623	815	808
Schedule Tribe	684	324	360
