= Karjjana =

Village in West Bengal, India

- Village
- Location in West Bengal, India Karjjana (India)
- Coordinates: 23°20′57.9″N 87°53′44.3″E
- Country: India
- State: West Bengal
- District: Purba Bardhaman
  - Rank: 4,684

Languages
  - Official: Bengali, English
- Time zone: UTC+5:30 (IST)
- PIN: 713102
- Telephone/STD code: 0342
- Lok Sabha constituency: Bardhaman-Durgapur
- Vidhan Sabha constituency: Bhatar
- Website: purbabardhaman.gov.in

Karjjana is a village in Bhatar, a Community development block in Bardhaman Sadar North subdivision of Purba Bardhaman district in the state of West Bengal, India.

== Population ==
Most of the villagers are from Scheduled Castes and Scheduled Tribes. Scheduled Tribes were 36.04% and Scheduled Castes 22.25% of the population in 2011.

Particulars	Total	Male	Female
Total no. of houses	990	-	-
Population	4,684	2,419	2,265
Child (0–6)	558	290	268
Schedule Caste	1,042	535	507
Schedule Tribe	1,688	860	828
