= Tulsidanga =

Village in Purba Bardhaman district, West Bengal, India

- village
- Tulsidanga
- Location in West Bengal, India Tulsidanga (India)
- Coordinates: 23°26′28.5″N 87°57′37.5″E
- Country: India
- State: West Bengal
- District: Purba Bardhaman

Population (2011)
  - Total: 2,394

Languages
  - official: Bengali, English
- Time zone: UTC+5:30 (IST)
- PIN: 713125
- Telephone/STD code: 0342
- Lok Sabha constituency: Bardhaman-Durgapur
- Vidhan Sabha constituency: Bhatar
- Website: purbabardhaman.gov.in

Tulsidanga is a village in the Purba Bardhaman district, West Bengal, India.

== History ==
The village of Tulsidanga is located in the Bhatar tehsil of Burdwan district in West Bengal, India.

== Demographics ==
The total geographic area of village is 363.11 hectares. Tulsidanga features a total population of 2,394 peoples. There are about 524 houses.

=== Housing ===
Particulars	Total	Male	Female
Total No. of Houses	524	-	-
Population	2,394	1,245	1,149
Child (0–6)	286	152	134
Schedule Caste	700	371	329
Schedule Tribe	34	16	18
