= Bigra =

- Village
- Location in West Bengal, India Bigra (India)
- Coordinates: 23°24′58.3″N 87°45′48.5″E
- Country: India
- State: West Bengal
- District: Purba Bardhaman

Population (2011)
  - Total: 1,863

Languages
  - Official: Bengali, English
- Time zone: UTC+5:30 (IST)
- PIN: 713127
- Telephone/STD code: 0342
- Lok Sabha constituency: Bardhaman-Durgapur
- Vidhan Sabha constituency: Bhatar
- Website: purbabardhaman.gov.in

Bigra is a village in Bhatar, a community development block in Bardhaman Sadar North subdivision of Purba Bardhaman district in the state of West Bengal, India.

== Population ==
Scheduled Castes and Scheduled Tribes: Scheduled Castes were 31.40% and Scheduled Tribes 14.17% of the population in 2011.

Particulars	Total	Male	Female
Total no. of houses	434	-	-
Population	1,863	933	930
Child (0–6)	197	105	92
Schedule Caste	585	292	293
Schedule Tribe	264	135	129
