= Sotkhali =

- Village
- Location in West Bengal, India Sotkhali (India)
- Coordinates: 23°24′01.5″N 87°55′51.5″E
- Country: India
- State: West Bengal
- District: Purba Bardhaman
  - Rank: 1,161

Languages
  - Official: Bengali, English
- Time zone: UTC+5:30 (IST)
- PIN: 713125
- Telephone/STD code: 0342
- Lok Sabha constituency: Bardhaman-Durgapur
- Vidhan Sabha constituency: Bhatar
- Website: purbabardhaman.gov.in

Sotkhali is a village in Bhatar, a community development block in Bardhaman Sadar North subdivision of Purba Bardhaman district in the state of West Bengal, India.

== Demographics ==
The total geographic area of village is 116.78 hectares. Sotkhali features a total population of 1,161 peoples. There are about 264 houses in Sotkhali village.

Particulars	Total	Male	Female
Total no. of houses	264	-	-
Population	1,161	590	571
Child (0–6)	123	61	62
Schedule Caste	318	171	147
Schedule Tribe	258	126	132
