= Silakot =

Sonchalida
- Village
- Location in West Bengal, India Sonchalida (India)
- Coordinates: 23°25′28.0″N 87°48′43.7″E
- Country: India
- State: West Bengal
- District: Purba Bardhaman
  - Rank: 1,896

Languages
  - Official: Bengali, English
- Time zone: UTC+5:30 (IST)
- PIN: 713121
- Telephone/STD code: 0342
- Lok Sabha constituency: Bardhaman-Durgapur
- Vidhan Sabha constituency: Bhatar
- Website: purbabardhaman.gov.in

Sonchalida is a village in Bhatar, a Community development block in Bardhaman Sadar North subdivision of Purba Bardhaman district in the state of West Bengal, India.

== Demographics ==
The village has an area of 161.56 hectares and the population was 1,896 in 2011.

Particulars	Total	Male	Female
Total no. of houses	420	-	-
Population	1,896	946	950
Child (0–6)	195	97	98
Schedule Caste	658	330	328
Schedule Tribe	477	235	242
