= Subhash Mondal =

Indian politician

Subhash Mondal (born 1968) is an Indian politician from West Bengal. He is a former three time member of the West Bengal Legislative Assembly from Bhatar Assembly constituency in Purba Bardhaman district. He won the 2016 West Bengal Legislative Assembly election representing the All India Trinamool Congress. Earlier, he was elected in the 1996 and 2001 elections representing the Communist Party of India (Marxist).

== Early life and education ==
Mondal is from Bhatar, Purba Bardhaman district, West Bengal. He is the son of Herambra Kumar Mondal. He completed his LLB at Tilka Manjhi Bhagalpur University in the year 1996. Earlier, he did his BSc at a college affiliated with the University of Burdwan, Burdwan in 1989. His wife is a teacher.

== Career ==
Mondal was first elected as an MLA from Bhatar Assembly constituency representing the Communist Party of India in the 1996 West Bengal Legislative Assembly election defeating defeated Banamali Hajra of Trinamool Congress, and retained the seat for the Communist Party in the 2001 West Bengal Legislative Assembly election where he beat Susanta Ghosh of the Indian National Congress. Later, he shifted to Trinamool Congress and was nominated to contest the 2016 Assembly election. In 2016, he polled 92,544 votes and defeated his nearest rival, Bamacharan Banerjee of the Communist Party of India (Marxist) by a margin of 6,280 votes.
