= Haribati =

- Village
- Location in West Bengal, India Haribati (India)
- Coordinates: 23°22′34.9″N 87°49′27.7″E
- Country: India
- State: West Bengal
- District: Purba Bardhaman
  - Rank: 858

Languages
  - Official: Bengali, English
- Time zone: UTC+5:30 (IST)
- PIN: 713127
- Telephone/STD code: 0342
- Lok Sabha constituency: Bardhaman-Durgapur
- Vidhan Sabha constituency: Bhatar
- Website: purbabardhaman.gov.in

Haribati is a small village in Bhatar CD block in Bardhaman Sadar North subdivision of Purba Bardhaman district in the state of West Bengal, India with a total of 171 families. It is located about 17 kilometres (11 mi) from West Bengal on Guskara railway station towards Guskara.

== Transport ==
At around 17 kilometres (11 mi) from Guskara, the journey to Haribati from the town can be made by bus and nearest rail station Guskara.

== Population ==
In Haribati village, most of the villagers are from Schedule Caste (SC). Schedule Caste (SC) constitutes 36.83% while Schedule Tribe (ST) were 10.84% of total population in Haribati village.

== Population and house data ==
Particulars	Total	Male	Female
Total no. of houses	171	-	-
Population	858	446	412
Child (0–6)	110	65	45
Schedule Caste	316	159	157
Schedule Tribe	93	52	41
