= Shunur =

- Village
- Location in West Bengal, India Shunur (India)
- Coordinates: 23°20′53.0″N 87°55′53.7″E
- Country: India
- State: West Bengal
- District: Purba Bardhaman
  - Rank: 2,710

Languages
  - Official: Bengali, English
- Time zone: UTC+5:30 (IST)
- PIN: 713121
- Telephone/STD code: 0342
- Lok Sabha constituency: Bardhaman-Durgapur
- Vidhan Sabha constituency: Bhatar
- Website: purbabardhaman.gov.in

Shunur is a village in Bhatar CD block in Bardhaman Sadar North subdivision of Purba Bardhaman district in the state of West Bengal, India.

The total geographic area of village is 360.08 hectares. Shunur features a total population of 2,710 people. There are about 612 houses in Shunur village.

== Population and house data ==
Particulars	Total	Male	Female
Total no. of houses	612	-	-
Population	2,710	1,415	1,295
Child (0–6)	249	138	111
Schedule Caste	1,193	614	579
Schedule Tribe	209	116	93
