= Usha, Purba Bardhaman =

Usha
- Village
- Location in West Bengal, India Usha (India)
- Coordinates: 23°27′27.5″N 87°55′24.5″E
- Country: India
- State: West Bengal
- District: Purba Bardhaman
  - Rank: 1,279

Languages
  - Official: Bengali, English
- Time zone: UTC+5:30 (IST)
- PIN: 713125
- Telephone/STD code: 0342
- Lok Sabha constituency: Bardhaman-Durgapur
- Vidhan Sabha constituency: Bhatar
- Website: purbabardhaman.gov.in

Usha is a village in Bhatar, a community development block in Bardhaman Sadar North subdivision of Purba Bardhaman district in the state of West Bengal, India.

== Demographics ==
The area is 494.7 hectares and the population was 1,279 in 2012.

Particulars	Total	Male	Female
Total no. of houses	331	-	-
Population	1,279	671	608
Child (0–6)	139	80	59
Schedule Caste	695	367	328
Schedule Tribe	0	0	0
