= Arra, Purba Bardhaman =

Arra
- Village
- Location in West Bengal, India Arra (India)
- Coordinates: 23°21′32.1″N 87°54′47.3″E
- Country: India
- State: West Bengal
- District: Purba Bardhaman

Population (2011)
  - Total: 2,821

Languages
  - Official: Bengali, English
- Time zone: UTC+5:30 (IST)
- PIN: 713125
- Telephone/STD code: 0342
- Lok Sabha constituency: Bardhaman-Durgapur
- Vidhan Sabha constituency: Bhatar
- Website: purbabardhaman.gov.in

Arra is a village in Bhatar CD block in Bardhaman Sadar North subdivision of Purba Bardhaman district in the state of West Bengal, India with total 671 families residing. It is located about 20 kilometres (12 mi) from West Bengal on National Highway towards Purba Bardhaman.

== Transport ==
At around 20 kilometres (12 mi) from Purba Bardhaman, the journey to Arra from the town can be made by bus.

== Population ==
Most of the villagers are from Schedule Castes (SC), which constitute 38.60% while Schedule Tribes (ST) were 2.62% of the total population in Arra village.

== Population and house data ==
Particulars	Total	Male	Female
Total no. of houses	671	-	-
Population	2,821	1,433	1,388
Child (0–6)	274	153	121
Schedule Caste	1,089	551	538
Schedule Tribe	74	35	39
