= Jharul =

- Village
- Location in West Bengal, India Jharul (India)
- Coordinates: 23°29′31.1″N 87°49′36.4″E
- Country: India
- State: West Bengal
- District: Purba Bardhaman
  - Rank: 2,545

Languages
  - Official: Bengali, English
- Time zone: UTC+5:30 (IST)
- PIN: 713121
- Telephone/STD code: 0342
- Lok Sabha constituency: Bardhaman-Durgapur
- Vidhan Sabha constituency: Bhatar
- Website: purbabardhaman.gov.in

Jharul is a village in Bhatar, a Community development block in Bardhaman Sadar North subdivision of Purba Bardhaman district in the state of West Bengal, India.

== Population ==
Scheduled Castes and Scheduled Tribes: Scheduled Tribes were 8.64% and Scheduled Castes of the population in 2011.

| Particulars | Total | Male | Female |
|---|---|---|---|
| Total no. of houses | 580 | - | - |
| Population | 2,545 | 1,310 | 1,235 |
| Child (0–6) | 303 | 158 | 145 |
| Schedule Caste | 162 | 73 | 89 |
| Schedule Tribe | 220 | 105 | 115 |
