= Gholada =

- Village
- Location in West Bengal, India Gholada (India)
- Coordinates: 23°24′17.5″N 87°46′39.1″E
- Country: India
- State: West Bengal
- District: Purba Bardhaman
  - Rank: 1,469

Languages
  - Official: Bengali, English
- Time zone: UTC+5:30 (IST)
- PIN: 713127
- Telephone/STD code: 0342
- Lok Sabha constituency: Bardhaman-Durgapur
- Vidhan Sabha constituency: Bhatar
- Website: purbabardhaman.gov.in

Gholada is a village in Bhatar, a community development block in Bardhaman Sadar North subdivision of Purba Bardhaman district in the state of West Bengal, India.

== Population ==
Scheduled Castes and Scheduled Tribes: Scheduled Tribes constitute 5.24% and Scheduled Castes 0.07% of the total population in Gholada village.

Particulars	Total	Male	Female
Total no. of houses	387	-	-
Population	1,469	750	719
Child (0–6)	159	80	79
Schedule Caste	1	0	1
Schedule Tribe	77	41	36
