= Bhatakul =

- Village
- Location in West Bengal, India Bhatakul (India)
- Coordinates: 23°26′22.6″N 87°58′33.7″E
- Country: India
- State: West Bengal
- District: Purba Bardhaman

Government
  - Type: sarpanch (village head)

Area
  - Total: 6.7429 km^{2} (2.6034 sq mi)

Population (2011)
  - Total: 5,607
  - Density: 831.5/km^{2} (2,154/sq mi)

Languages
  - Official: Bengali, English
- Time zone: UTC+5:30 (IST)
- PIN: 713125
- Telephone/STD code: 0342
- Lok Sabha constituency: Bardhaman-Durgapur
- Vidhan Sabha constituency: Bhatar
- Website: purbabardhaman.gov.in

Bhatakul is a village in Bhatar, Bardhaman Sadar North subdivision, Purba Bardhaman district, in the state of West Bengal, India. The village is located 25.61 kilometres (15.91 mi) northeast of Bardhaman. Bhatakul is administrated by an elected sarpanch (village head) who represents the people of the village, as directed by the Constitution of India and the Panchyati Raaj Act.

== History ==
The 2011 Census of India identifies Bhatakul's village location code (VLC) or village code (VC) as 319838. The village is located in the Bharat Tehsil of Burdwan district in West Bengal, India, and is situated 13.3 km away from sub-district headquarters Bhatar. Barddhaman is the district headquarters of Bhatakul village. Per 2009 statistics, Bologna is the gram panchayat of Bhatakul village.

== Transportation ==
Bhatakul is located around 27.9 kilometres (17.3 mi) from Purba Bardhaman. The journey to Bhatakul from the town of Purba Bardhaman can be made by bus or by rail via the nearest railway station, Bhatar.

== Population ==
Bhatakul had a population of 5,607 people and 1,265 families. In Bhatakul, Schedule Castes (SC) represent 21.56% of the total population, and Scheduled Tribes (ST) represent 0.50% of the population.

== Population and house data ==
Particulars	Total	Male	Female
Total no. of houses	1,265	-	-
Population	5,607	2,863	2,744
Children (0–6)	621	304	317
Schedule Caste	1,209	645	564
Schedule Tribe	28	9	19

== Healthcare ==
There are currently no hospitals in Bhatakul.

== Schools ==
There are two schools in Bhatakul: Bhatakul Pubbapara F.P. School (established in 1972) and Bhatakul Swarnamoyee High School (established in 1914).
