= Jhikardanga =

- Village
- Location in West Bengal, India Jhikardanga (India)
- Coordinates: 23°21′51.6″N 87°52′15.0″E
- Country: India
- State: West Bengal
- District: Purba Bardhaman
  - Rank: 592

Languages
  - Official: Bengali, English
- Time zone: UTC+5:30 (IST)
- PIN: 713102
- Telephone/STD code: 0342
- Lok Sabha constituency: Bardhaman-Durgapur
- Vidhan Sabha constituency: Bhatar
- Website: purbabardhaman.gov.in

Jhikardanga is a village in Bhatar CD block in Bardhaman Sadar North subdivision of Purba Bardhaman district in the Indian state of West Bengal. It supports 120 families. It is located about 14 kilometres (8.7 mi) from West Bengal on National Highway towards Purba burdhaman.

== Transport ==
At around 14 kilometres (8.7 mi) from Purba Bardhaman, the journey to Jhikardanga from the town can be made by bus and nearest rail station Bardhaman.

== Demographics ==
Jhikardanga has substantial population of Scheduled Castes, constituting 29% of total population in Jhikardanga village.

Particulars	Total	Male	Female
Total no. of houses	120	-	-
Population	592	319	273
Child (0–6)	55	33	22
Schedule Caste	173	92	81
Schedule Tribe	0	0	0

== Healthcare ==
The nearest rural hospital is at Bhatar (with 60 beds). Primary health centers are present.

== Education ==
Schools include:

- Jhikardanga S.S.R.K. F.P. School.
