= Nityanandapur =

- Village
- Location in West Bengal, India Nityanandapur (India)
- Coordinates: 23°27′55.0″N 87°56′14.2″E
- Country: India
- State: West Bengal
- District: Purba Bardhaman
  - Rank: 4,764

Languages
  - Official: Bengali, English
- Time zone: UTC+5:30 (IST)
- PIN: 713125
- Telephone/STD code: 0342
- Lok Sabha constituency: Bardhaman-Durgapur
- Vidhan Sabha constituency: Bhatar
- Website: purbabardhaman.gov.in

Nityanandapur is a village in Bhatar community development block in Bardhaman Sadar North subdivision of Purba Bardhaman district in the state of West Bengal, India.

== Population ==
Scheduled Castes and Scheduled Tribes: Schedules Castes constitute 19.71% and Scheduled Tribes 3.59% of the population.

Particulars	Total	Male	Female
Total no. of houses	1,087	–	–
Population	4,764	2,486	2,278
Child (0–6)	564	313	251
Schedule Caste	939	479	460
Schedule Tribe	171	88	83
