= Narjja =

- Village
- Location in West Bengal, India Narjja (India)
- Coordinates: 23°23′12.7″N 87°54′00.9″E
- Country: India
- State: West Bengal
- District: Purba Bardhaman
  - Rank: 1,460

Languages
  - Official: Bengali, English
- Time zone: UTC+5:30 (IST)
- PIN: 713125
- Telephone/STD code: 0342
- Lok Sabha constituency: Bardhaman-Durgapur
- Vidhan Sabha constituency: Bhatar
- Website: purbabardhaman.gov.in

Narjja is a village in Bhatar, a community development block in Bardhaman Sadar North subdivision of Purba Bardhaman district in the state of West Bengal, India.

== Population ==
Most of the villagers are members of Scheduled Castes and Scheduled Tribes. Scheduled Tribes were 27.40% of the populations and Scheduled Castes 26.51% in 2011.

Particulars	Total	Male	Female
Total no. of houses	301	-	-
Population	1,460	745	715
Child (0–6)	153	81	72
Schedule Caste	387	199	188
Schedule Tribe	400	196	204
