= Amarun =

- Village
- Location in West Bengal, India Amarun (India)
- Coordinates: 23°22′08.2″N 87°55′54.8″E
- Country: India
- State: West Bengal
- District: Purba Bardhaman

Population (2011)
  - Total: 2,639

Languages
  - Official: Bengali, English
- Time zone: UTC+5:30 (IST)
- PIN: 713125
- Telephone/STD code: 0342
- Lok Sabha constituency: Bardhaman-Durgapur
- Vidhan Sabha constituency: Bhatar
- Website: purbabardhaman.gov.in

Amarun is a village in Bhatar, a Community development block in Bardhaman Sadar North subdivision of Purba Bardhaman district in the state of West Bengal, India.

== Demographics ==
The area of the village is 653.97 hectares and the population was 2639 in 2011.

Particulars	Total	Male	Female
Total no. of houses	579	-	-
Population	2,639	1,345	1,294
Child (0–6)	276	141	135
Scheduled Castes	1,562	795	767
Schedule Tribes	118	57	61
Literacy	70.88 %	76.99 %	64.54 %
