= Ambana =

- Village
- Location in West Bengal, India Ambana (India)
- Coordinates: 23°22′35.2″N 87°55′47.02″E
- Country: India
- State: West Bengal
- District: Purba Bardhaman

Population (2011)
  - Total: 1,782

LanguagesA
  - Official: Bengali, English
- Time zone: UTC+5:30 (IST)
- PIN: 713127
- Telephone/STD code: 0342
- Lok Sabha constituency: Bardhaman-Durgapur
- Vidhan Sabha constituency: Bhatar
- Website: purbabardhaman.gov.in

Ambana is a village in Bhatar, a Community development block in Bardhaman Sadar North subdivision of Purba Bardhaman district in the state of West Bengal, India.

== Demographics ==
The village is 653.97 hectares in area with a population of 1,782.

Particulars	Total	Male	Female
Total no. of houses	420	-	-
Population	1,782	900	882
Child (0–6)	162	73	89
Schedule Castes	520	265	255
Schedule Tribes	156	73	83
Literacy	75.80 %	82.10 %	69.23 %
