= Orgram =

- Village
- Location in West Bengal, India Orgram (India)
- Coordinates: 23°26′32.6″N 87°46′00.0″E
- Country: India
- State: West Bengal
- District: Purba Bardhaman
  - Rank: 13,554

Languages
  - Official: Bengali, English
- Time zone: UTC+5:30 (IST)
- PIN: 713167
- Telephone/STD code: 0342
- Lok Sabha constituency: Bardhaman-Durgapur
- Vidhan Sabha constituency: Bhatar
- Website: purbabardhaman.gov.in

Orgram is a village in Bhatar, a CD block in Bardhaman Sadar North subdivision of Purba Bardhaman district in the state of West Bengal, India.

== Demographics ==
The area is 2,938.76 hectares (7,261.8 acres) and the population is 13,554 in about 3,229 houses.

Particulars	Total	Male	Female
Total no. of houses	3,229	-	-
Population	13,554	6,854	6,700
Child (0–6)	1,486	741	745
Schedule Caste	6,232	3,223	3,009
Schedule Tribe	3,654	1,819	1,835
