= Mangobinda Adhikari =

Indian politician

Member of West Bengal Legislative Assembly
- In office 2 May 2021 – 4 May 2026
- Preceded by: Subhas Mondal
- Constituency: Bhatar

Personal details
- Party: AITC
- Profession: Politician

Mangobinda Adhikari (born 1986) is an Indian politician from West Bengal. He is a member of All India Trinamool Congress from the Bhatar constituency. He won the 2021 West Bengal Legislative Assembly election.

== Early life and education ==
Mangobinda is from Bhatar, Purba Bardhaman district, West Bengal. He is the son of late Bishnucharan Adhikari. He studied Class 12 at Aruar BMDP Institute and passed the Higher Secondary Examination in 1973.

== Career ==
Mangobinda won from Bhatar Assembly constituency representing All India Trinamool Congress in the 2021 West Bengal Legislative Assembly election. He polled 108,028 votes and defeated his nearest rival, Mahendranath Kowar of the Bharatiya Janata Party, by a margin of 31,741 votes.
