= Muidhara =

- Village
- Location in West Bengal, India Muidhara (India)
- Coordinates: 23.05°N 87.77°E
- Country: India
- State: West Bengal
- District: Purba Bardhaman

Population (2011)
  - Total: 1,376

Languages
  - Official: Bengali, English, Hindi
- Time zone: UTC+5:30 (IST)
- Website: purbabardhaman.gov.in

Muidhara is a village in Khandaghosh CD block in Bardhaman Sadar South subdivision of Purba Bardhaman district in West Bengal, India.

== Geography ==
Muidhara is located at 23.05°N 87.77°E. The neighbours of Muidhara are Moiradanga, Uchalan, Induti, Purba Chowk, Gopal Bera, Kendur etc. It is approximately halfway between Bardhaman and Arambag cities on State highway 7.

== Demographics ==
As per the 2011 Census of India Muidhara had a total population of 1,376 of which 711 (52%) were males and 665 (48%) were females. Population below 6 years was 139. The total number of literates in Muidhara was 1,051 (84.96% of the population over 6 years).

== Education ==
Techno India, an English-medium school, following the CBSE curriculum, was opened at Muidhara in 2011. Muidhara has a Free Primary School.
