= Kumarun =

- Village
- Location in West Bengal, India Kumarun (India)
- Coordinates: 23°25′13.5″N 87°50′22.1″E
- Country: India
- State: West Bengal
- District: Purba Bardhaman
  - Rank: 931

Languages
  - Official: Bengali, English
- Time zone: UTC+5:30 (IST)
- PIN: 713121
- Telephone/STD code: 0342
- Lok Sabha constituency: Bardhaman-Durgapur
- Vidhan Sabha constituency: Bhatar
- Website: purbabardhaman.gov.in

Kumarun is a village in Bhatar, a Community development block in Bardhaman Sadar North subdivision of Purba Bardhaman district in the state of West Bengal, India.

== Demographics ==
The area of the village is 253.62 hectares and the population in 2011 was 931.

Particulars	Total	Male	Female
Total no. of houses	217	-	-
Population	931	477	454
Child (0–6)	88	50	38
Schedule Caste	433	216	217
Schedule Tribe	0	0	0
Literacy	69.75 %	74.71 %	64.66 %
