= Balsidanga =

- Village
- Location in West Bengal, India Balsidanga (India)
- Coordinates: 23°22′52.8″N 87°55′33.4″E
- Country: India
- State: West Bengal
- District: Purba Bardhaman

Population (2011)
  - Total: 1,340

Languages
  - Official: Bengali, English
- Time zone: UTC+5:30 (IST)
- PIN: 713125
- Telephone/STD code: 0342
- Lok Sabha constituency: Bardhaman-Durgapur
- Vidhan Sabha constituency: Bhatar
- Website: purbabardhaman.gov.in

Balsidanga is a village in Bhatar, a community development block in Bardhaman Sadar North subdivision of Purba Bardhaman district in the state of West Bengal, India.

== Demographics ==
The area was 303.52 hectares and the population 1,340 in 2011.

Particulars	Total	Male	Female
Total no. of houses	301	-	-
Population	1,340	701	639
Child (0–6)	138	79	59
Schedule Caste	413	216	197
Schedule Tribe	6	3	3
Literacy	74.54 %	82.32 %	66.21 %
