= Orgram Chatuspalli High Madrasah =

Coordinates: 23°26′1.02″N 87°54′45.39″E

Orgram Chatuspalli High Madrasah (H.S)
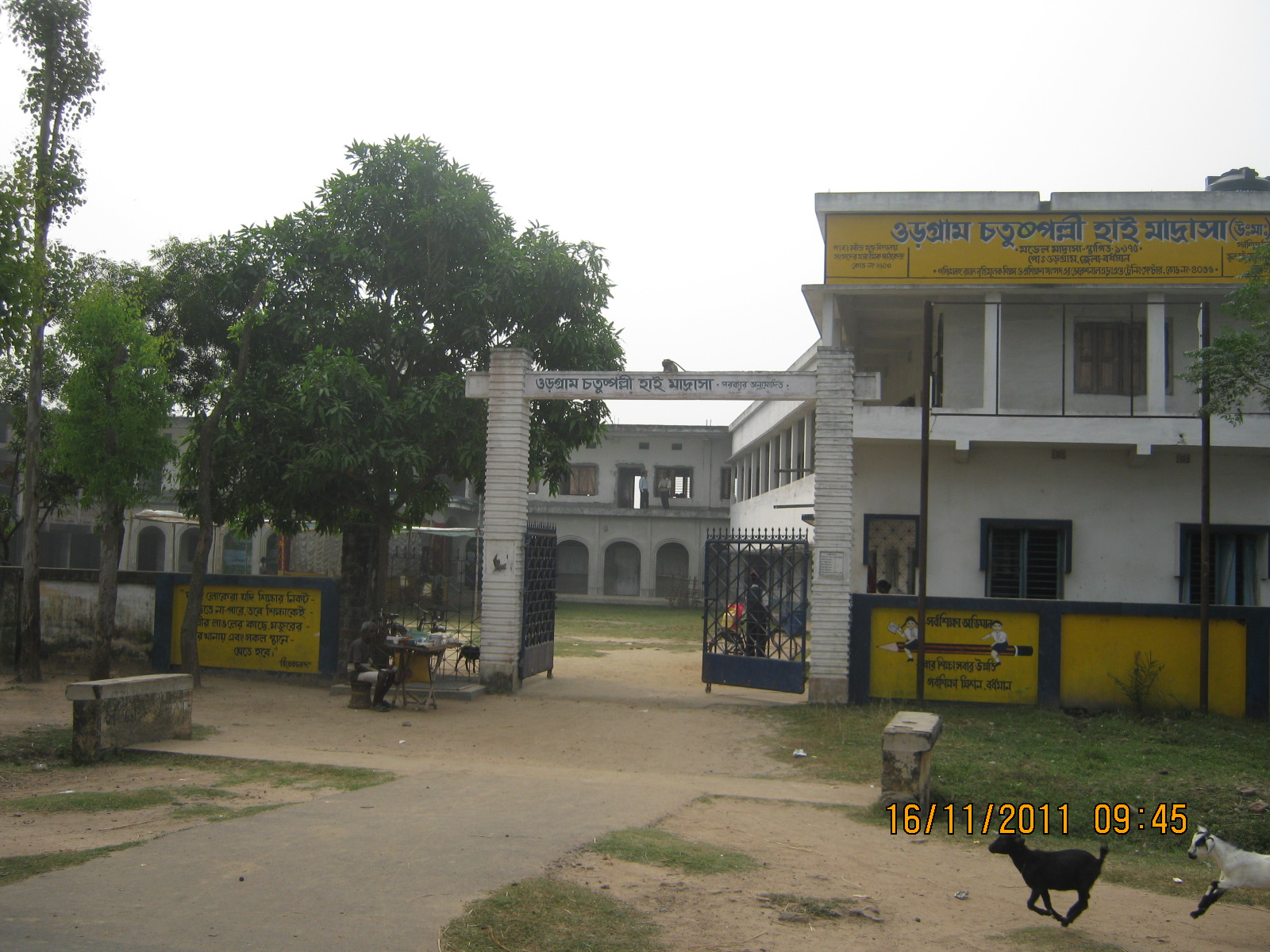
- Burdwan, West Bengal; India

Information
- Type: Government aided
- Established: 1975
- School board: WBBME
- Headmaster: Anwar Hossian
- Grades: 5th to 12th Standard
- Enrollment: 1339(secondary $ H.S Section)
- Website: www.ochmhs.org

Orgram Chatuspalli High Madrasah is a model madrasah in Orgram village, Burdwan district, in the Indian state of West Bengal, India. It is divided into secondary, higher secondary, rabindra open school, and vocational training. It enrolls students from class V to Higher secondary(+2). It has over 1,339 students and 41 teachers in secondary and higher secondary areas.
