= Narayanpur, Purba Bardhaman =

Narayanpur
- Village
- Location in West Bengal, India Narayanpur (India)
- Coordinates: 23°24′31.6″N 87°49′48.7″E
- Country: India
- State: West Bengal
- District: Purba Bardhaman
  - Rank: 2,285

Languages
  - Official: Bengali, English
- Time zone: UTC+5:30 (IST)
- PIN: 713127
- Telephone/STD code: 0342
- Lok Sabha constituency: Bardhaman-Durgapur
- Vidhan Sabha constituency: Bhatar
- Website: purbabardhaman.gov.in

Narayanpur is a large village in Bhatar CD block in Bardhaman Sadar North subdivision of Purba Bardhaman district in the state of West Bengal, India.

== Population and house data ==
The Narayanpur village has population of 2285 of which 1141 are males while 1144 are females as per Population Census 2011. In Narayanpur village population of children with age 0-6 is 244 which makes up 10.68 % of total population of village. Average Sex Ratio of Narayanpur village is 1003 which is higher than West Bengal state average of 950. Child Sex Ratio for the Narayanpur as per census is 937, lower than West Bengal average of 956. Narayanpur village has lower literacy rate compared to West Bengal. In 2011, literacy rate of Narayanpur village was 73.79 % compared to 76.26 % of West Bengal. In Narayanpur Male literacy stands at 84.04 % while female literacy rate was 63.65 %.

Particulars	Total	Male	Female
Total no. of houses	538	-	-
Population	2,285	1,141	1,144
Child (0–6)	244	126	118
Schedule Caste	1,003	505	498
Schedule Tribe	495	234	261
Literacy	73.79 %	84.04 %	63.65 %
