= Hanrgram =

- Village
- Location in West Bengal, India Hanrgram (India)
- Coordinates: 23°23′03.7″N 87°57′06.2″E
- Country: India
- State: West Bengal
- District: Purba Bardhaman

Area
  - Total: 5.5574 km^{2} (2.1457 sq mi)
  - Rank: 5,301

Languages
  - Official: Bengali, English
- Time zone: UTC+5:30 (IST)
- PIN: 713125
- Telephone/STD code: 0342
- Lok Sabha constituency: Bardhaman-Durgapur
- Vidhan Sabha constituency: Bhatar
- Website: purbabardhaman.gov.in

Hanrgram is a village in Bhatar community development block in Bardhaman Sadar North subdivision of Purba Bardhaman district in the state of West Bengal, India.

== Population ==
As of 2011, Scheduled Castes and Scheduled Tribes constituted over a quarter of the population, with Scheduled Castes 22.30% of the population and Scheduled Tribes 5.21% of the total population.

Particulars	Total	Male	Female
Total no. of houses	1,221	-	-
Population	5,301	2,687	2,614
Child (0–6)	608	311	297
Schedule Caste	1,182	591	591
Schedule Tribe	276	146	130
