= Bamunara =

Bamunara may refer to the following villages in West Bengal, India:

- Bamunara, Paschim Bardhaman
- Bamunara, Purba Bardhaman
