= Soumen Karfa =

Indian politician (born 1992)

Soumen Karfa (born 1992) is an Indian politician from West Bengal. He is a member of West Bengal Legislative Assembly from the Bhatar Assembly constituency in Purba Bardhaman district representing the Bharatiya Janata Party.

== Early life ==
Karfa is from Bhatar, Purba Bardhaman district, West Bengal. He is the son of Rabindranath Karfa. He completed his MA at University of Burdwan in 2018. He and his wife run their family business. He declared assets worth Rs.2 crore in his affidavit to the Election Commission of India.

== Career ==
Karfa won the Bhatar Assembly constituency representing the Bharatiya Janata Party in the 2026 West Bengal Legislative Assembly election. He polled 98,820 votes and defeated his nearest rival, Shantanu Koner of the All India Trinamool Congress, by a margin of 6,528 votes.
