= Nasigram =

- Village
- Location in West Bengal, India Nasigram (India)
- Coordinates: 23°24′50.9″N 88°00′30.2″E
- Country: India
- State: West Bengal
- District: Purba Bardhaman
  - Rank: 7,503

Languages
  - Official: Bengali, English
- Time zone: UTC+5:30 (IST)
- PIN: 713125
- Telephone/STD code: 0342
- Lok Sabha constituency: Bardhaman-Durgapur
- Vidhan Sabha constituency: Bhatar
- Website: purbabardhaman.gov.in

Nasigram is a village in Bhatar, a community development block in Bardhaman Sadar North subdivision of Purba Bardhaman district in the state of West Bengal, India.

== Population ==
Scheduled Castes were 38.81% of the population in 2011.

Particulars	Total	Male	Female
Total no. of houses	1,708	-	-
Population	7,503	3,818	3,685
Child (0–6)	689	352	337
Schedule Caste	2,912	1,461	1,451
Schedule Tribe	47	18	29
