= Balgona =

- Village
- Location in West Bengal, India Balgona (India)
- Coordinates: 23.447111°N 87.937889°E
- Country: India
- State: West Bengal
- District: Purba Bardhaman

Population (2011)
  - Total: 7,203

Languages
  - Official: Bengali, English
- Time zone: UTC+5:30 (IST)
- Lok Sabha constituency: Bardhaman-Durgapur
- Vidhan Sabha constituency: Bhatar
- Website: purbabardhaman.gov.in

Balgona (also spelled Balgana) is a village in Bhatar CD block in Bardhaman Sadar North subdivision of Purba Bardhaman district in the state of West Bengal, India.

== Demographics ==
As per the 2011 Census of India Balgana had a total population of 7,203, of which 3,717 (52%) were males and 3,486 (48%) were females. Population below 6 years was 832. The total number of literates in Balgana was 4,505 (70.71% of the population over 6 years).

== Transport ==
Balgona railway station is situated on the Bardhaman-Balgona sector. EMU trains are being operated on this section from 2012. Burdwan Katwa Railway was undergoing gauge conversion from 2 ft 6 in (762 mm) narrow gauge to 1,676 mm (5 ft 6 in). The Bardhaman-Katwa line, after conversion from narrow gauge to electrified broad gauge, was opened to the public on 12 January 2018.

State Highway 14 running from Dubrajpur (in Birbhum district) to Betai (in Nadia district) passes near Balgona.

== Education ==
Susundighi HP High School at PO Nityanandapur, near Balgona railway station, was established in 1898. It is a Bengali-medium coeducational school with facilities for teaching from class V to XII.

== Culture ==
=== Nangteswar Shiva temple at Babladihi ===
A 3 feet tall black stone idol of Mahavira Tirthankara is worshipped as Nangteswar Shiva at Babladihi nearby. A big fair is organised during Maha Shivaratri.

== Healthcare ==
There is a primary health centre at Balgona.
