= Bagbati =

- Village
- Location in West Bengal, India Bagbati (India)
- Coordinates: 23.593418°N 87.716036°E
- Country: India
- State: West Bengal
- District: Purba Bardhaman

Population (2011)
  - Total: 1,052

Languages
  - Official: Bengali, English
- Time zone: UTC+5:30 (IST)
- PIN: 713126
- Telephone/STD code: 0342
- Lok Sabha constituency: Bardhaman-Durgapur
- Vidhan Sabha constituency: Ausgram
- Website: purbabardhaman.gov.in

Bagbati is a village located under the Ausgram II Community Development Block of Purba Bardhaman district, in the Indian state of West Bengal. It is located at a distance of 15 km from Guskhara and encompasses a total of 61.8 hectares. It is home to 272 households having a total populations of 1,052 individuals as of 2011.
