= Sheikh Saidul Haque =

Indian politician

Professor Sheikh Saidul Haque

Member of Parliament, Lok Sabha
- In office 2009-2014
- Constituency: Bardhaman-Durgapur, West Bengal

Personal details
- Born: 28 June 1954 (age 72). Village Jagulipara, Purba Bardhaman, (West Bengal).
- Citizenship: India
- Party: Communist Party of India (Marxist)
- Spouse: Mrs. Jharna Haque
- Children: 1 son & 1 daughter.
- Parent(s): Mr. SK Namder Haque (Father), Mrs. Nasera Bibi (Mother)
- Education: Burdwan Raj College.
- Profession: Professor & Politician.
- Committees: Member of several committees

Prof. Sheikh Saidul Haque is a Professor, Indian Politician and was Member of Parliament of the 15th Lok Sabha of India. He represented the Bardhaman-Durgapur constituency of West Bengal and is a member of the Communist Party of India (Marxist) political party.

Haque has also published a book Moulabad and Muslim Janamanas (Fundamentalism and Muslim Mentality).

== Early life and education ==
Saidul Haque was born in village Jagulipara under Galsi I block in Bardhaman district of (West Bengal). He had his schooling from Paraj High School. He completed his education from Burdwan Raj College in Purba Bardhaman district. Haque has B.Ed. M.A. & D.Litt degrees. He is a professor by profession.

== Political career ==
As a Professor in the Burdwan Raj College, he has been involved with the college and university teachers' movement as a leading figure of the district WEBCUTA (West Bengal College and University Teachers' Association). He has also been a District committee member of the WBDWAA (West Bengal Writers' and Artists' Association), and was involved in organising the progressive cultural movement in the Galsi block. He has also been an integral part of the Literacy campaign in the district. He served as the Vice Chairman of the Galsi-I Panchayat Samiti. Saidul Haque is the first and incumbent M.P. from Bardhaman-Durgapur constituency; which came into existence from 2009.

== Posts Held ==
#	From	To	Position
01	2001	2009	Chairman, District Primary Education Council, Bardhaman, West Bengal
02	2009	2014	Member, 15th Lok Sabha
03	2009	2014	Member, Committee on Commerce
04	2009	2014	Member, Consultative Committee on Minority Affairs
05	2013	2014	Member, House Committee

== See also ==
- 15th Lok Sabha
- Politics of India
- Parliament of India
- Government of India
- Communist Party of India (Marxist)
- Bardhaman-Durgapur
