= Badshahi Road =

Historical road in Bengal

The Badshahi Road (Imperial Road) is historically one of the most important roads in Bengal. It might be as old as 300 BC This Badshahi road became most prominent connecting road from Maldah (Gour) through Murshidabad to Puri (Orissa) during Mughal period. One can trace a great deal of history along this road. The wide raised road with Masjids (mosques) on every eight miles & the big ponds (dighi) remind the prosperous Mughal time in history. It was the main road for Hindus from North India and Bengal who travelled to the Jagannath Temple in Puri, Orissa which happened to be one of the four main centres organized by Adi Shankara (788-820CE). After Chaitanya (1486–1533CE) and his followers spread the Bhakti movement of Vaishnavism sect throughout Bengal, the traffic of Bengali pilgrimage going south to Puri and north-west to Vrindavan on the road increased further.
