= Rajipur =

- Village
- Rajipur
- Country: India
- State: Uttar Pradesh
- District: Farrukhabad

Area
  - Total: 1 km^{2} (0.39 sq mi)
  - Rank: 1,920

Languages
  - Official: Hindi, English
- Time zone: UTC+5:30 (IST)
- PIN: 209724
- Telephone/STD code - 05692: 209724
- Lok Sabha - Farrukhabad: Farrukhabad, Loksabha - Farrukhabad, State U.P.
- Vidhan Sabha Bhojpur: Farrukhabad
- Website: farrukhabad.nic.in

Rajipur is a village in District Farrukhabad of Uttar Pradesh, Kamlagamj block, Tehail Sadar, Farrukhabad.

== Demographics ==
The area of village is 152.93 hectares and the population is 1,920.
