= Bhatar =

- Village
- Location in West Bengal, India Bhatar (India)
- Coordinates: 23°25′11.0″N 87°55′00.0″E
- Country: India
- State: West Bengal
- District: Purba Bardhaman

Population (2011)
  - Total: 3,383

Languages
  - Official: Bengali, English
- Time zone: UTC+5:30 (IST)
- PIN: 713125 (Bhatar)
- Telephone/STD code: 0342
- Lok Sabha constituency: Bardhaman-Durgapur
- Vidhan Sabha constituency: Bhatar
- Website: purbabardhaman.gov.in

Bhatar is a village in Bhatar CD block in Bardhaman Sadar North subdivision of Purba Bardhaman district in the state of West Bengal, India.

== Geography ==
Cities and towns in the Bardhaman Sadar North subdivision of Purba Bardhaman district
M: municipal city/ town, CT: census town, R: rural/ urban centre, H: historical site, W: river project, C: craft centre
Owing to space constraints in the small map, the actual locations in a larger map may vary slightly

=== Police station ===
Bhatar police station has jurisdiction over Bhatar CD Blocks. The area covered is 163.44 km^{2}.

=== CD block HQ ===
The headquarters of Bhatar CD block are located at Bhatar.

=== Urbanisation ===
73.58% of the population of Bardhaman Sadar North subdivision live in the rural areas. Only 26.42% of the population live in the urban areas, and that is the highest proportion of urban population amongst the four subdivisions in Purba Bardhaman district. The map alongside presents some of the notable locations in the subdivision. All places marked in the map are linked in the larger full screen map.

== Demographics ==
As per the 2011 Census of India Bhatar had a total population of 3.383, of which 1,702 (50%) were males and 1,681 (50%) were females. The Population below 6 years was 355. The total number of literates in Bhatar was 2,164 (71.47% of the population over 6 years).

== Transport ==
The Bardhaman-Katwa line after conversion from narrow gauge to electrified broad gauge was opened to the public on 12 January 2018. Bhatar railway station is situated at Bhatar.

== Education ==
Dasarathi Hazra Memorial College was established in 2013 at Bhatar and is affiliated to the University of Burdwan. It offers honours courses in Bengali, Sanskrit, history, English, philosophy and education.

== Healthcare ==
Bhatar Rural Hospital at Bhatar (with 60 beds) is the main medical facility in Bhatar CD block. There are primary health centres at Balgona (with 2 beds), Bijipur, PO Basuda (with 6 beds), Bonpass (with 10 beds), Erruar, PO Aruarar (with 10 beds), Nasigram (with 6 beds) and Sahebganj (with 4 beds).

== See also ==
- Healthcare in West Bengal
