= Balgona railway station =

Railway Station in West Bengal

Balgona

General information
- Location: Nityanandapur, Balgona, Purba Bardhaman district, West Bengal; India
- Coordinates: 23.457991°N 87.950423°E
- Elevation: 30 m (98 ft)
- System: Kolkata Suburban Railway
- Owner: Indian Railways
- Operator: Eastern Railway
- Line: Bardhaman–Katwa line
- Platforms: 2
- Tracks: 1

Construction
- Structure type: Standard (on-ground station)

Other information
- Status: Functioning
- Station code: BGNA
- Zone(s): Eastern Railway
- Division(s): Howrah

History
- Opened: 1915
- Closed: 2010
- Rebuilt: 2014–2018
- Electrified: 25 kV AC overhead
- Former names: McLeod's Light Railways

Services
| Preceding station | Kolkata Suburban Railway | Following station |
|---|---|---|
| Bhatar towards Barddhaman Junction | Eastern Line Bardhaman–Katwa line | Saota towards Katwa Junction |
Route map
Location
- Location within West Bengal Location within India

Balgona railway station is a railway station in Bardhaman–Katwa line under Howrah railway division of Eastern Railway zone. It is situated at Nityanandapur, Balgona of Purba Bardhaman district in the Indian state of West Bengal.

== History ==
On 1 December 1915, McLeod's Light Railways set up narrow-gauge lines in the Burdwan-Katwa Railway route. This railway section was handed over to the Eastern Railway in 1966. In 2010 the work started for conversion of 5 ft 6 in (1,676 mm) broad gauge. Bardhaman to Balogna railway station was reopened in 2014 and Balgona to Katwa section was completed on 12 January 2018 for the public.
