= Painta =

Painta Painte
- Village
- Interactive map of Painta
- Location in West Bengal,India Painta (India)
- Coordinates: 22.9829°N 87.8009°E
- Country: India
- State: West Bengal
- District: Purba Bardhaman

Population (2011)
  - Total: 3,841
- PIN: 713427
- Telephone: 03451
- Website: purbabardhaman.gov.in

Painta is a village located in Purba Bardhaman, West Bengal, India.
