= Lakhuria =

Village in India

Lakhuria is a village located in the district of Purba Bardhaman, West Bengal, India.
