= Bhuyera =

- Village
- Location in West Bengal, India Bhuyera (India)
- Coordinates: 23°33′34.2″N 87°34′58.1″E
- Country: India
- State: West Bengal
- District: Purba Bardhaman

Population (2011)
  - Total: 3,779

Languages
  - Official: Bengali, English
- Time zone: UTC+5:30 (IST)
- Lok Sabha constituency: Bolpur
- Vidhan Sabha constituency: Ausgram
- Website: purbabardhaman.gov.in

Bhuyera is a village located in the Ausgram II CD Block in Bardhaman Sadar North subdivision of the Purba Bardhaman district, in West Bengal, India.

== Transport ==
At around 20 kilometres (12 mi) from Guskara, the journey to Bhuyera from the town can be made by bus to Chhora then 2 km by own arrangement and nearest rail station Guskara .

== Geography ==
Cities and towns in the Bardhaman Sadar North subdivision of Purba Bardhaman district
M: municipal city/ town, CT: census town, R: rural/ urban centre, H: historical site, W: river project, C: craft centre
Owing to space constraints in the small map, the actual locations in a larger map may vary slightly

== Population ==
Schedule Caste (SC) constitutes 18.79% while Schedule Tribe (ST) were 9.87% of total population in Bhuyera village.

== Religious beliefs and festivals ==
Durga Puja, Kali Puja and Jagaddhatri Puja are the main festivals that are celebrated in Bhuyera. Dhaneshwar Shiv Puja also a main festival of 10 villages including Bhuyera, organised Sankranti Mela on Charak Sankranti at Dhonkora. Maliara Rajbari first started Durga Puja in Bhuyera in the 17th century and is still celebrated traditionally. In the last few years, local clubs and communities have competed with each other for designing the best Durga Puja murtis (idols), mandaps (interior of abode), and pandals (bamboo and cloth makeshift enclosures) with hundreds of thousands of rupees often being spent by each club.

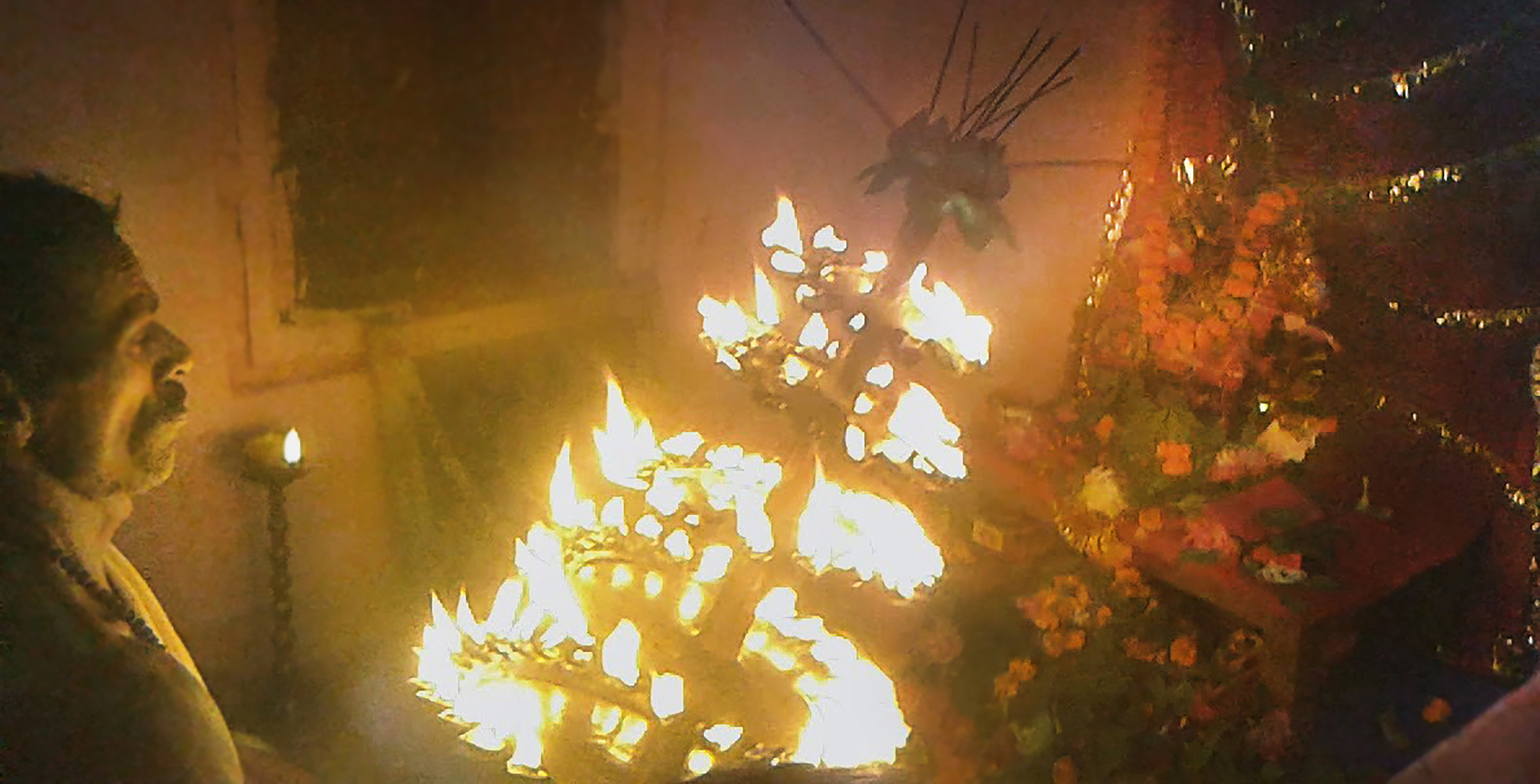
Jagaddhatri Puja at Mukherjee Family

Jagaddhatri Puja is one of the main festivals of Bhuyera celebrated by locals traditionally. The Jagaddhatri Puja of Mukherjee family, Parikhapara adjacent to Parimal Mukherjee lane, deserves a special mention in this regard. Folklore has it that this puja was started in 1920 by late Suborna Bala Mukherjee. Hundreds of people of Maliara gathers to celebrate Jagaddhatri Puja with Mukherjee family and the festival last for 3 days. The exact history of the deity is unknown, but family records date it back to 1900.

With respect to its tribal history, people in Bhuyera fly Kites to celebrate "Mage Porob","Baa Porob","Baraam Puja", the day of a "Ho" tribal god. This is on the last day of the month of Poush, i.e. Poush Sankranti. Apart from kite-flying, a fair is also held on Poush Sankranti. It has a rural flavour and is characterised by the trading of handicraft and household goods. The items of the trade include spades, knives and other iron tools, combs and other goods made of buffalo-horn, baskets (jhuri and dhama) and platters for husking (kula) made of bamboo and cane, etc.
