= Uchalan =

- Village
- Location in West Bengal, India Uchalan (India)
- Coordinates: 23.0333°N 87.7833°E
- Country: India
- State: West Bengal
- District: Purba Bardhaman

Population (2011)
  - Total: 7,439

Languages
  - Official: Bengali, English
- Time zone: UTC+5:30 (IST)
- PIN: 713427
- Telephone code: 03451
- Sex ratio: 937 ♂/♀
- Website: purbabardhaman.gov.in

Uchalan is a village in Raina II CD block in Bardhaman Sadar South subdivision of Purba Bardhaman district in West Bengal, India.

== History ==
Uchalan is a historical village, here remains of Mughal Battle Fort found. A large man-made lake measuring 62 acre situated towards north–south at the heart of this village. This lake at Uchalan which was dug by King Sher Shah Suri during his rule (1540 A.D.-1545 A.D.) in India. There were Mughal Inn (Sarai khana) at the bank of lake which was converted to daak-bungalow later in British rule.

== Geography ==
The entire village surrounded by Agriculture land. There are many ponds within the village which is balancing eco-system.

== Demographics ==
As per the 2011 Census of India Uchalan had a total population of 7,439, of which 3,778 (51%) were males and 3,661 (49%) were females. Population below 6 years was 773. The total number of literates in Uchalan was 5,123 (76.85% of the population over 6 years).

== Economy ==
Main occupation of the villagers is agriculture. Approximately 80% people living in this village directly and indirectly depend on Agriculture. About 10% people are in multiple services and about 10% people are involved in small shop-keeper businesses.

Uchalan is a village where there is a one sub-post office, two nationalised banks, one petrol pump, seventeen rice mill, one animal health center, one State government circle office, and one state government affiliated library is located. This library serves the village and surrounding area.

== Transport ==
It is located on Arambagh-Burdwan highway.

The proposed Arambagh-Bowaichandi railway line will run through inside this village.

== Education ==
It has one higher secondary school, two government recognized primary schools, and two private schools for primary education. The high school, named as Uchalan High School, was set up in 1930.

Aklakhi High School is a coeducational higher secondary school at Uchalan. Established in 1955, it has arrangements for teaching from class VI to XII.

Uchalan High School, a coeducational institution, established in 1930. is affiliated with the West Bengal Board of Secondary Education.

There is also a privately owned high school in muidhara operated by Techno India Group Public School Konnagar established in 21st November 2025.
