= Kendur =

Village in West Bengal, India

Kendur Temple Village
- Census Town
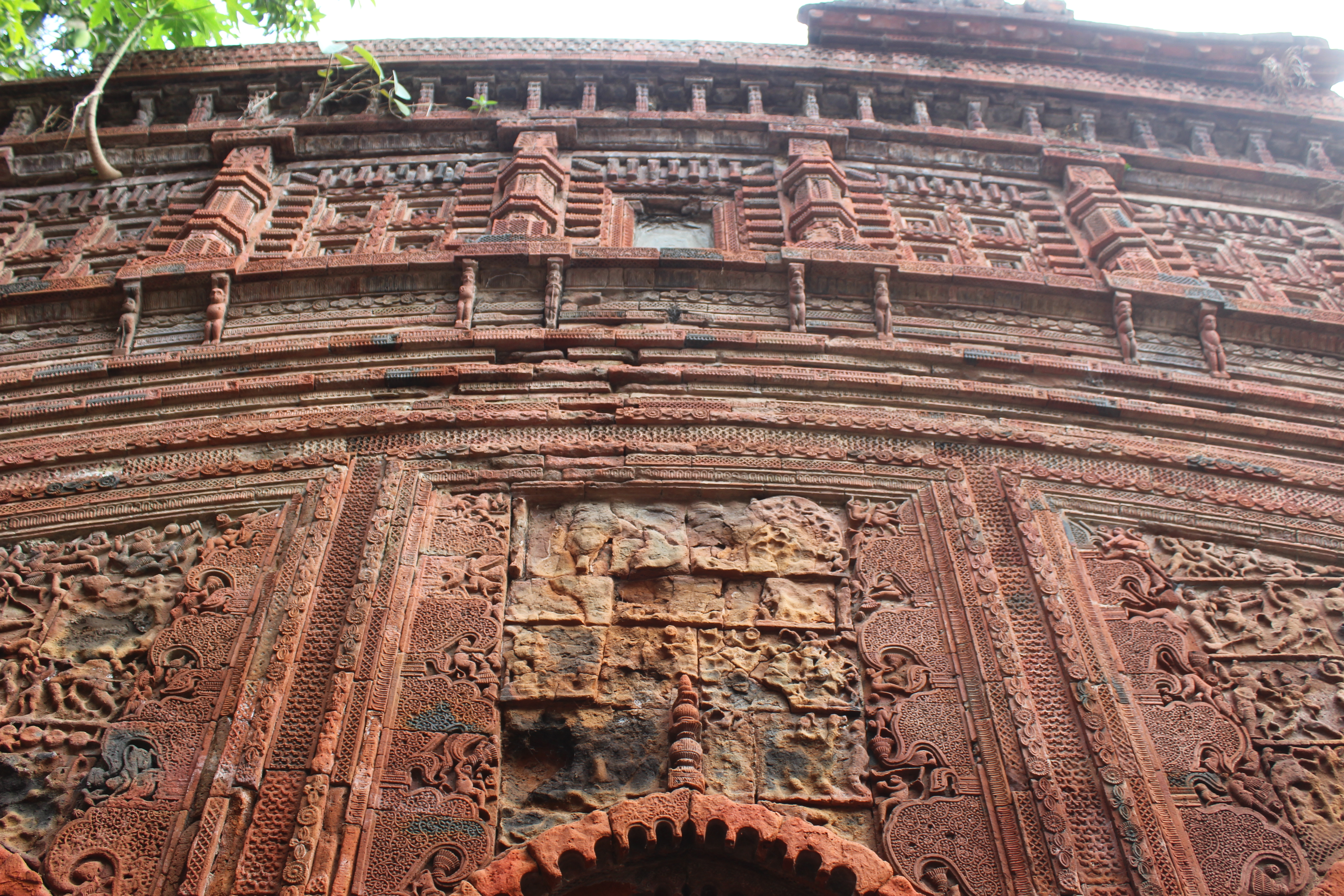
- Damodar Temple at Kendur
- Interactive map of Kendur
- Location in West Bengal,India Kendur (India)
- Coordinates: 23.0333°N 87.7833°E
- Country: India
- State: West Bengal
- District: Purba Bardhaman

Government
  - Type: Gram Panchayat
  - Body: Gopalbara Gram Panchayat

Area
  - Census Town: 5 km^{2} (1.9 sq mi)
  - Land: 4.12 km^{2} (1.59 sq mi)
  - Water: 0.88 km^{2} (0.34 sq mi)
  - Urban: 1.8 km^{2} (0.69 sq mi)
  - Rural: 3.4 km^{2} (1.3 sq mi)
- Elevation: 30 m (98 ft)
- Highest elevation: 35 m (115 ft)
- Lowest elevation: 10 m (33 ft)

Population (2011)
  - Census Town: 3,639
  - Estimate (August 2025): 4,500
  - Density: 900/km^{2} (2,300/sq mi)
  - Urban: 500+
  - Rural: 3,000+

Language
  - Official: Bengali
  - Additional-Official: English
- Time zone: UTC+5:30 (Indian Standard Time)
- Pin: 713427
- Telephone: +91-342
- Vidhan Sabha constituency: Khandoghosh
- Lok Sabha constituency: Bishnupur

Kendur is a village located in Khandoghosh, Purba Bardhaman District in West Bengal, India. Its correct pronunciation is 'Kedur'.

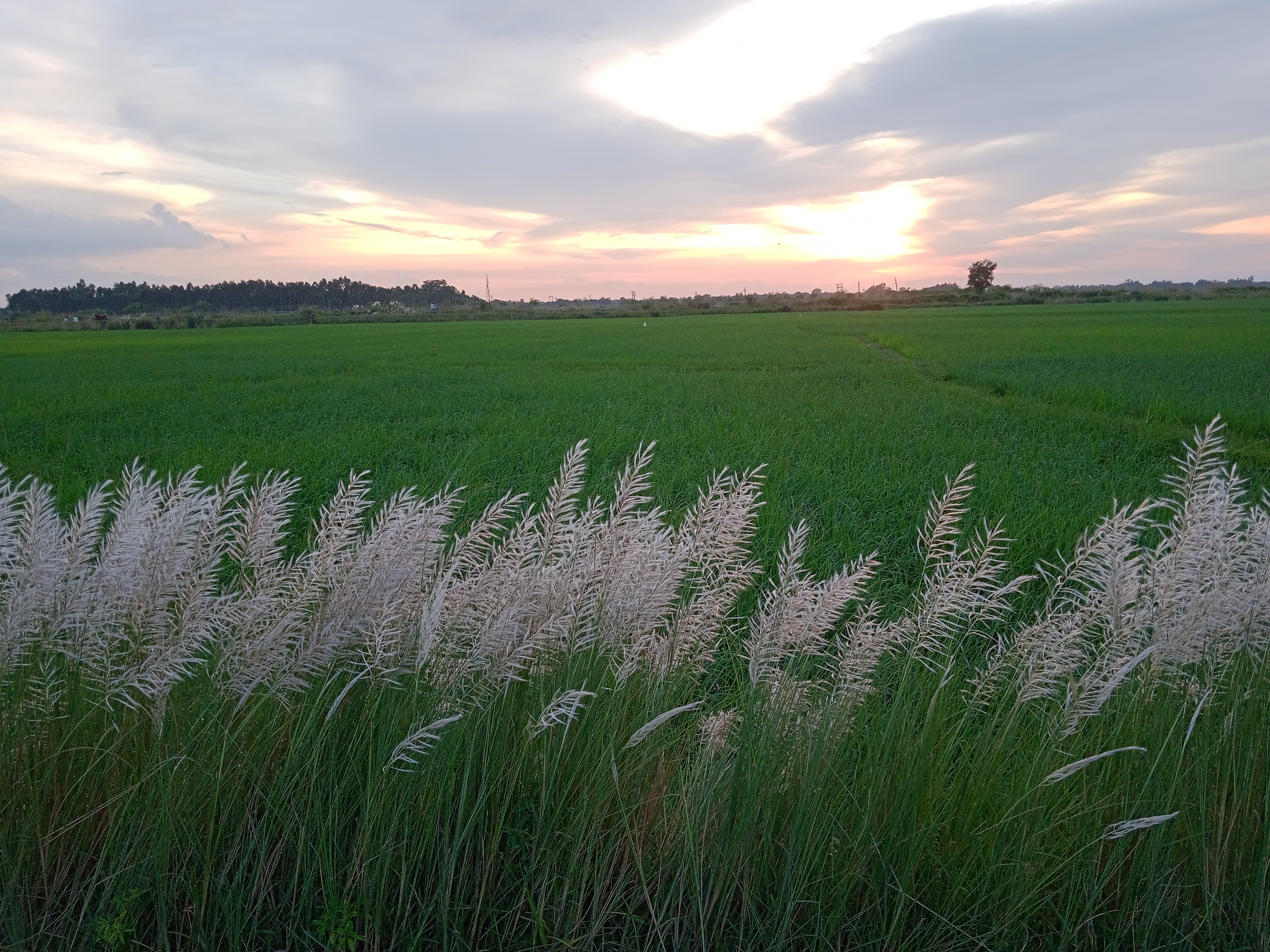
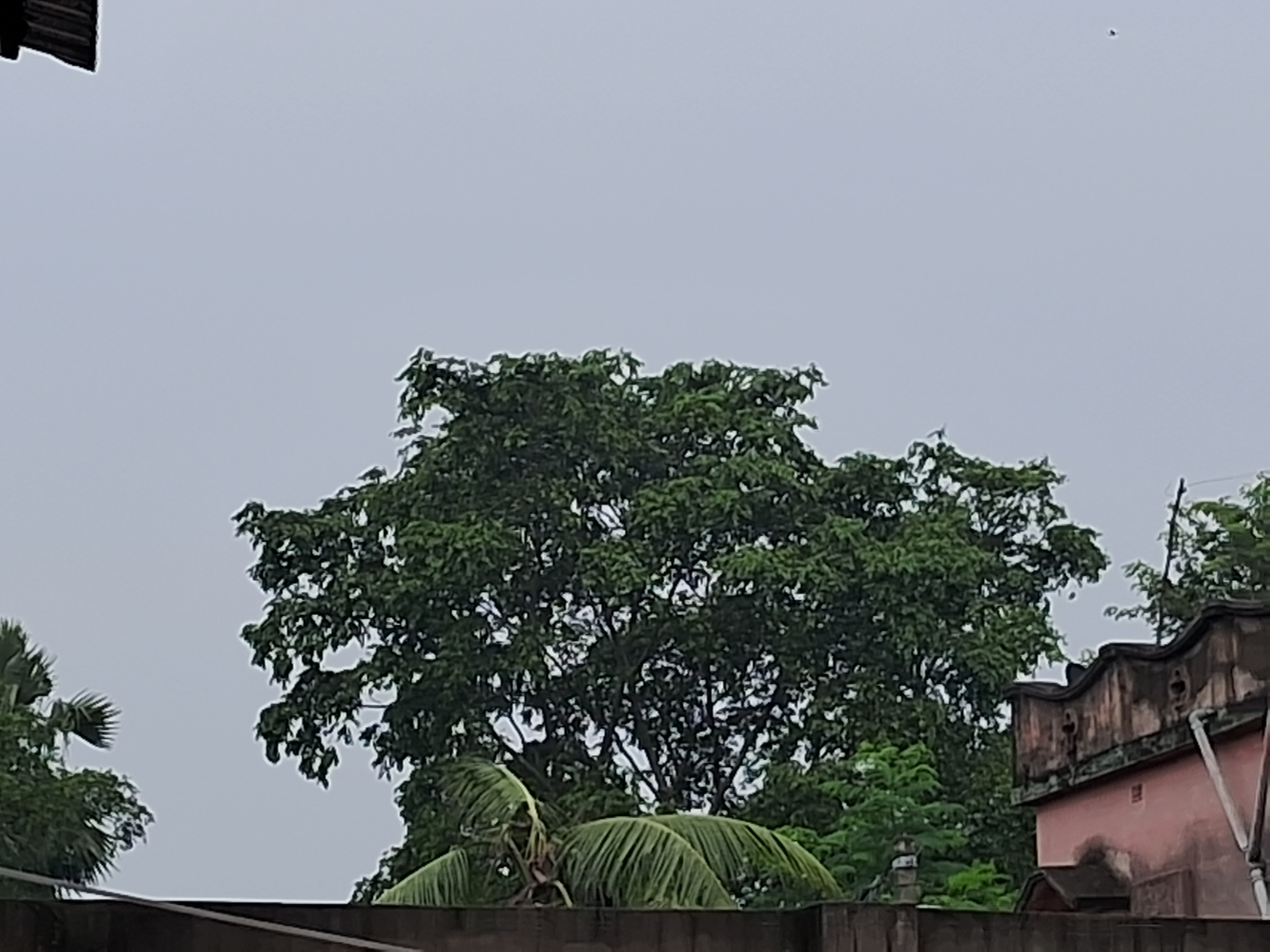
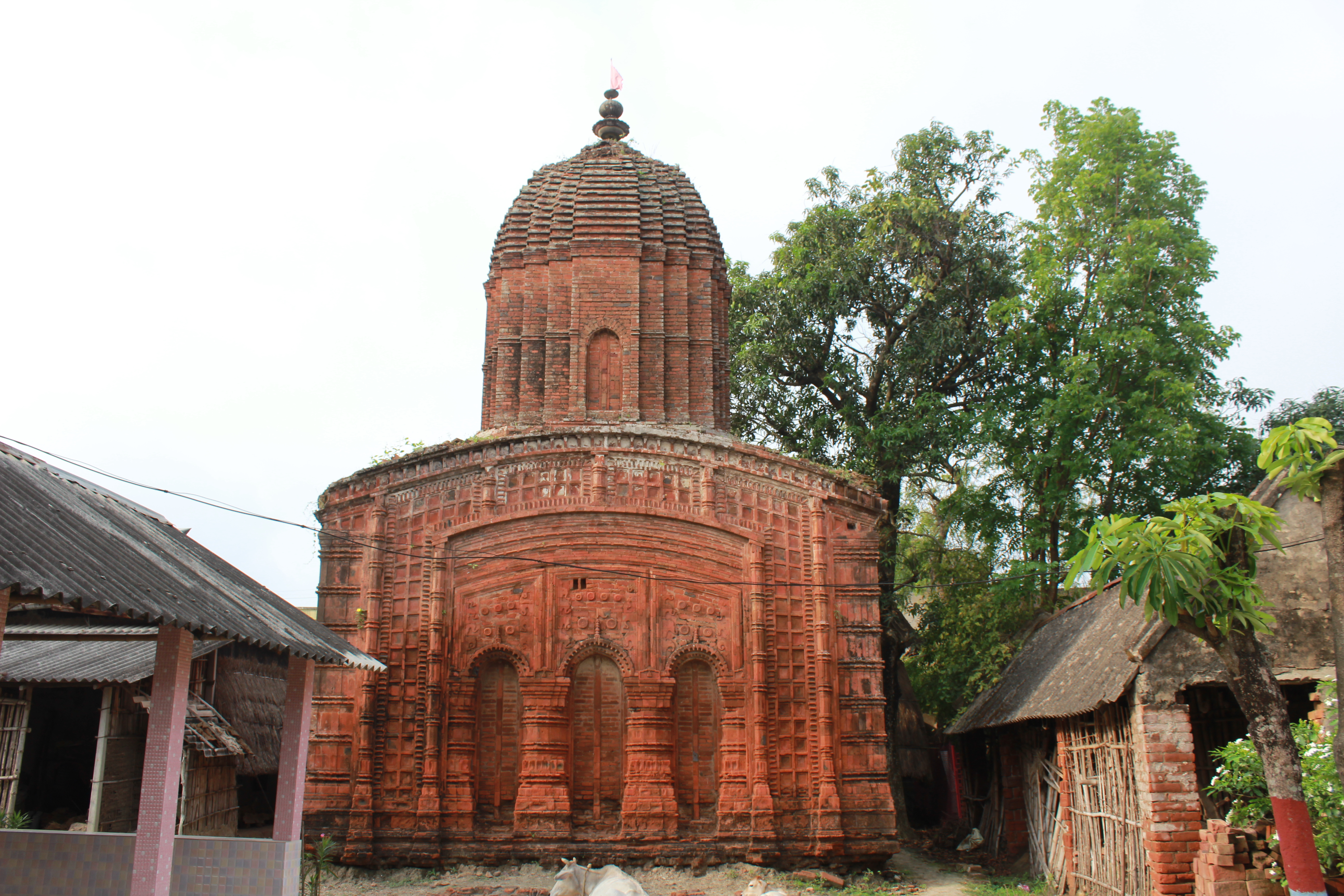
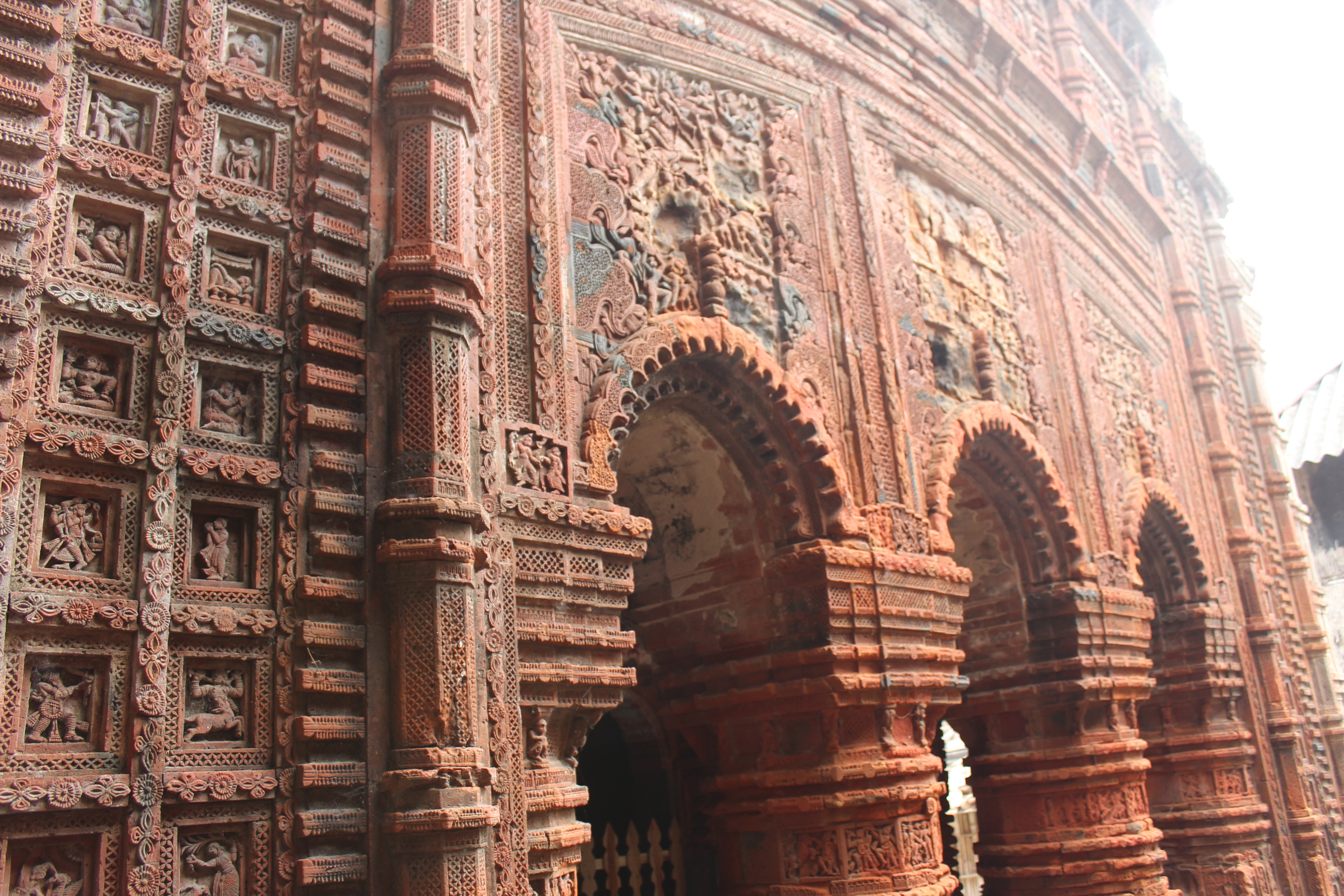
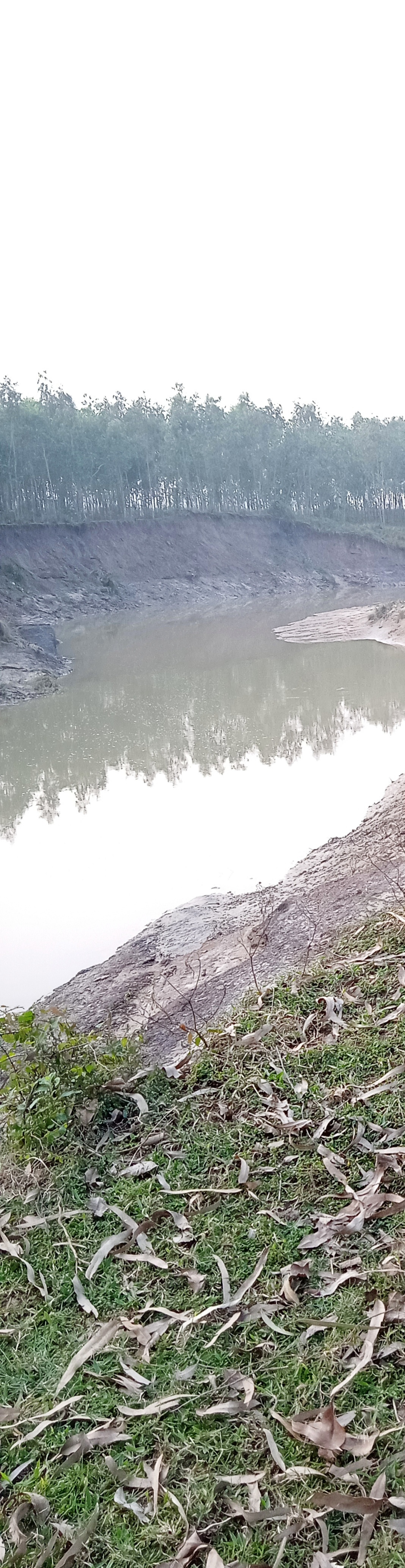
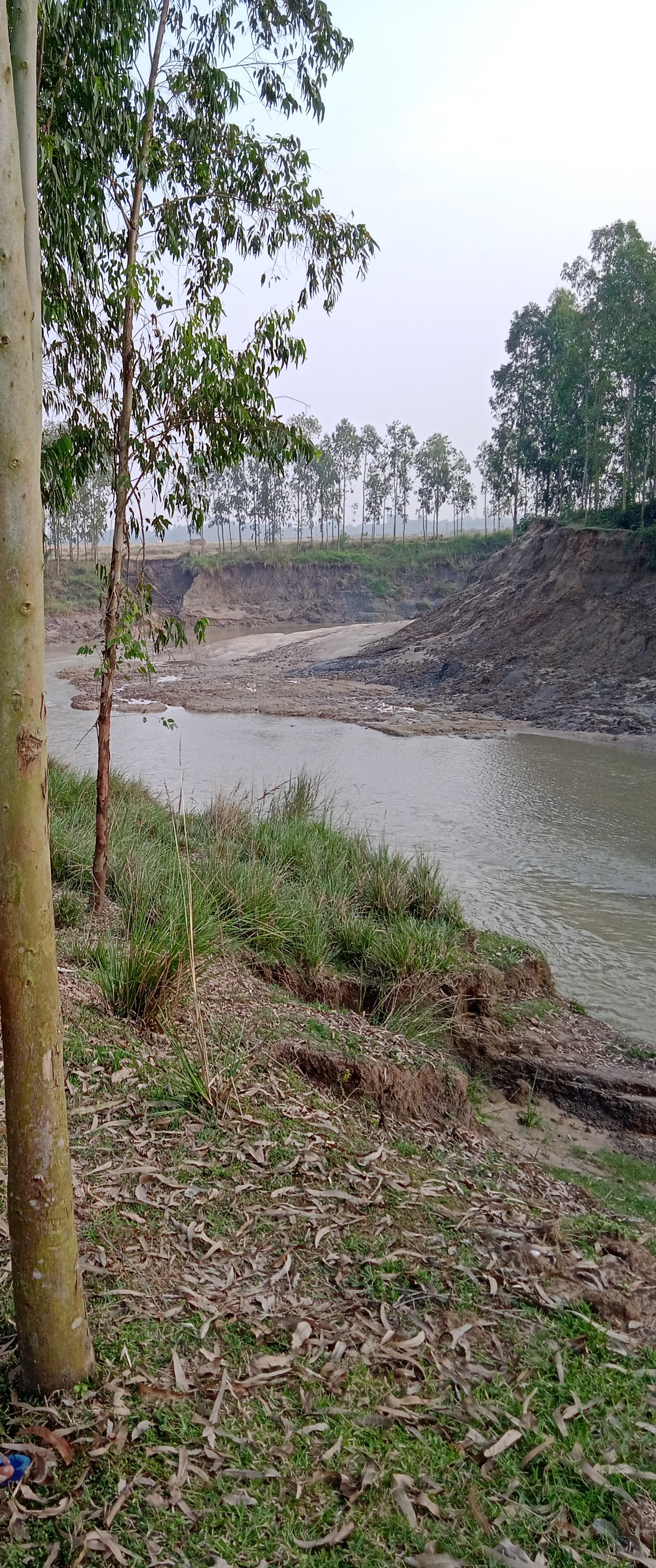

== Location ==
Kendur is located in Khandoghosh community development block in Purba Bardhaman district in West Bengal, India.

== Food ==
Rasgulla is most popular sweet in this region.

== Demographics ==
Languages spoken in Kendur
1. Bengali (97.7%)
2. Santali (2.20%)
3. Others (0.10%)
4. 0.00%

Bengali is the most spoken language followed by Santali and .

== Climate ==
Climate data for Kendur (1991 to 2020)
Month	Jan	Feb	Mar	Apr	May	Jun	Jul	Aug	Sep	Oct	Nov	Dec	Year
Record high °F (°C)	97.9 (36.6)	101.8 (38.8)	104.7 (40.4)	114.8 (46.0)	115.7 (46.5)	113.4 (45.2)	103.6 (39.8)	99.0 (37.2)	100.4 (38.0)	96.8 (36.0)	95.0 (35.0)	91.4 (33.0)	115.7 (46.5)
Mean daily maximum °F (°C)	77.5 (25.3)	84.9 (29.4)	92.1 (33.4)	97.9 (36.6)	97.9 (36.6)	95.7 (35.4)	91.4 (33.0)	91.0 (32.8)	90.7 (32.6)	90.0 (32.2)	86.5 (30.3)	80.4 (26.9)	90.1 (32.3)
Mean daily minimum °F (°C)	53.4 (11.9)	61.5 (16.4)	68.5 (20.3)	76.1 (24.5)	78.1 (25.6)	79.2 (26.2)	78.6 (25.9)	78.1 (25.6)	77.0 (25.0)	73.9 (23.3)	64.2 (17.9)	56.5 (13.6)	71.1 (21.7)
Record low °F (°C)	39.9 (4.4)	42.6 (5.9)	53.1 (11.7)	58.3 (14.6)	59.7 (15.4)	65.5 (18.6)	66.9 (19.4)	62.6 (17.0)	60.8 (16.0)	59.7 (15.4)	49.6 (9.8)	39.9 (4.4)	39.9 (4.4)
Average rainfall inches (mm)	0.37 (9.3)	0.85 (21.7)	1.15 (29.2)	2.37 (60.2)	3.67 (93.3)	8.53 (216.7)	12.29 (312.1)	10.46 (265.7)	8.70 (221.0)	4.61 (117.0)	0.39 (9.8)	0.25 (6.3)	53.64 (1,362.4)
Average rainy days	0.8	1.7	2.2	3.1	5.8	10.3	15.1	13.9	11.2	5.8	0.8	0.6	71.2
Average relative humidity (%) (at 17:30 IST)	61	62	59	62	65	73	81	80	81	78	67	61	70
Source: Indian Metreological Department

== Education ==
Colleges:-

- Kendur ITI College

Schools:-

- Amra Primary School
- Baura High School
- Baura Primary School
- Kendur High School
- Kendur Primary School

== Healthcare ==
There are two Primary Health Centres in Kendur each with two beds.
