= Banamali Hazra =

Indian politician

Member of West Bengal Legislative Assembly
- In office 2011–2016
- Constituency: Bhatar

Personal details
- Born: Banamali Hazra
- Party: All India Trinamool Congress
- Occupation: Cultivation & Social Worker

Banamali Hazra is an Indian politician. He was elected to the West Bengal Legislative Assembly from Bhatar in the 2011 West Bengal Legislative Assembly election as a member of the All India Trinamool Congress.
