= Bhatar railway station =

Railway Station in West Bengal

Bhatar

General information
- Location: Bardhaman–Katwa Road, Palar, Bhatar, Purba Bardhaman district, West Bengal; India
- Coordinates: 23.406388°N 87.924930°E
- Elevation: 33 m (108 ft)
- System: Indian Railways station and Kolkata Suburban Railway station
- Owner: Indian Railways
- Operator: Eastern Railway
- Line: Bardhaman–Katwa line
- Platforms: 1
- Tracks: 1

Construction
- Structure type: Standard (on-ground station)

Other information
- Status: Functioning
- Station code: BTRH
- Zone(s): Eastern Railway
- Division(s): Howrah

History
- Opened: 1915
- Closed: 2010
- Rebuilt: 2014–2018
- Electrified: 25 kV AC overhead
- Former names: McLeod's Light Railways

Services
Preceding station	Kolkata Suburban Railway	Following station
Amarun towards Barddhaman Junction	Eastern Line Bardhaman–Katwa line	Balgona towards Katwa Junction
Route map
Location
- Location within West Bengal Location within India

Bhatar railway station is a railway station in Bardhaman–Katwa line under Howrah railway division of Eastern Railway zone. It is situated beside Bardhaman–Katwa Road at Palar, Bhatar of Purba Bardhaman district in the Indian state of West Bengal.

== History ==
On 1 December 1915, McLeod's Light Railways (MLR) set up narrow-gauge lines in the Burdwan-Katwa Railway route. This railway section was handed over to the Eastern Railway in 1966. In 2010 the work started for conversion of 5 ft 6 in (1,676 mm) broad gauge. Bardhaman to Balogna railway station was reopened in 2014 and Balgona to Katwa section was completed on 12 January 2018 for the public.
