= Ratanpur, Purba Bardhaman =

Ratanpur
- Village
- Location in West Bengal, India Ratanpur (India)
- Coordinates: 23°24′38.59″N 87°50′44.0″E
- Country: India
- State: West Bengal
- District: Purba Bardhaman
  - Rank: 1,418

Languages
  - Official: Bengali, English
- Time zone: UTC+5:30 (IST)
- PIN: 713121
- Telephone/STD code: 0342
- Lok Sabha constituency: Bardhaman-Durgapur
- Vidhan Sabha constituency: Bhatar
- Website: purbabardhaman.gov.in

Ratanpur is a small village in Bhatar CD block in Bardhaman Sadar North subdivision of Purba Bardhaman district in the state of West Bengal, India with total 316 families residing. It is located about 26 kilometres (16 mi) from West Bengal on National Highway towards Purba Bardhaman.

== Transport ==
At around 26 kilometres (16 mi) from Purba Bardhaman, the journey to Ratanpur from the town can be made by bus and nearest rail station bhatar.

== Population ==
In Ratanpur, most of the villagers are from Schedule Caste (SC). Schedule Caste (SC) constitutes 63.26% while Schedule Tribe (ST) was 0.14% of the total population in Ratanpur village.

== Population and house data ==
| Particulars | Total | Male | Female |
|---|---|---|---|
| Total no. of houses | 316 | - | - |
| Population | 1,418 | 744 | 674 |
| Child (0–6) | 146 | 71 | 75 |
| Schedule Caste | 897 | 465 | 432 |
| Schedule Tribe | 2 | 2 | - |
