= Bhatar (community development block) =

- Community development block
- Location in West Bengal
- Coordinates: 23°25′10″N 87°55′00″E
- Country: India
- State: West Bengal
- District: Purba Bardhaman
- Parliamentary constituency: Bardhaman-Durgapur
- Assembly constituency: Bhatar

Area
  - Total: 160.24 sq mi (415.01 km^{2})
- Elevation: 121 ft (37 m)

Population (2011)
  - Total: 263,064
  - Density: 1,641.7/sq mi (633.87/km^{2})
- Time zone: UTC+5.30 (IST)
- PIN: 713125 (Bhatar); 713127 (Bonpas); 713121 Ratanpur, West Bengal
- Telephone/STD code: 0342
- Vehicle registration: WB-37,WB-38,WB-41,WB-42,WB-44
- Literacy Rate: 71.56%
- Website: http://purbabardhaman.gov.in/

Bhatar is a community development block that forms an administrative division in Bardhaman Sadar North subdivision of Purba Bardhaman district in the Indian state of West Bengal.

== History ==
There are Sati temples at Mondalpara and Maidal burning ghat in Bonpas village, and in Mohanpur village bearing witness to the now-defunct practice of sati in the area.

In the 18th century the area faced massive attacks of the Bargi warriors.

This being a canal-irrigated area had faced agitations, in the 1930s, against the imposition of taxes for canal water.

== Geography ==
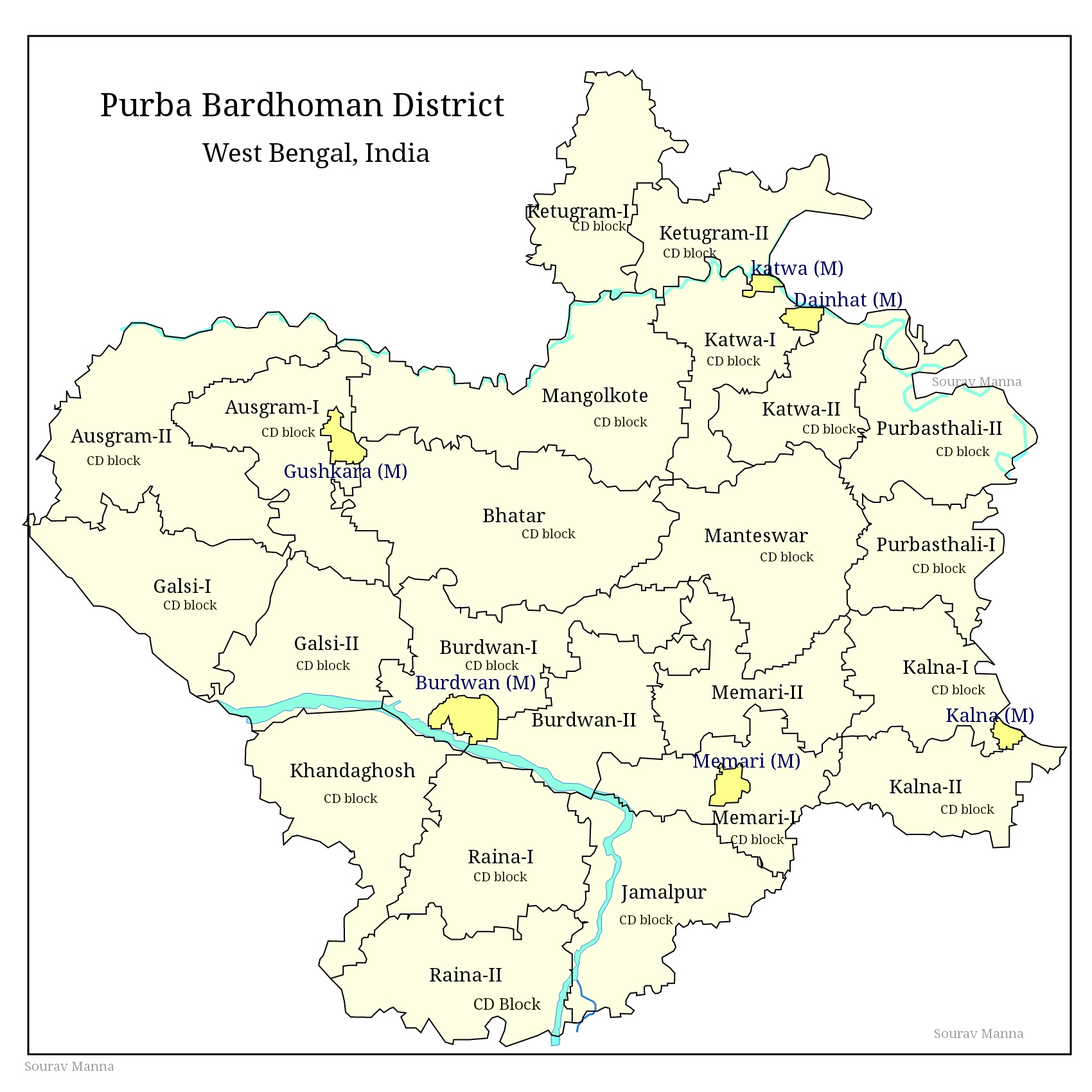
CD blocks of Purba Bardhaman district

=== Location ===
Bhatar is located at 23°25′10″N 87°55′00″E.

Bhatar CD Block is part of the Bardhaman Plain, the central plain area of the district. The area is surrounded by the Bhagirathi on the east, the Ajay on the north-west and the Damodar on the west and south. Old river channels and small creeks found in the region dry up in the dry season, but the Bardhaman Plains are sometimes subject to heavy floods during the rainy season. The region has recent alluvial soils.

Bhatar CD Block is bounded by Mongalkote CD Block on the north, Manteswar CD Block on the east, Burdwan I CD Block on the south and Ausgram I CD Block on the west.

Bhatar CD Block has an area of 415.01 km^{2}. It has 1 panchayat samity, 14 gram panchayats, 201 gram sansads (village councils), 107 mouzas and 104 inhabited villages. Bhatar police station serves this block. Headquarters of this CD Block is at Bhatar.

Gram panchayats of Bhatar block/panchayat samiti are: Amarun I, Amarun II, Aruar, Balgona, Bamunara, Barabelun I, Barabelun II, Bhatar, Bonpas, Mahachanda, Mahata, Nityanandapur, Sahebganj I and Sahebganj II.

== Demographics ==
=== Population ===
As per the 2011 Census of India Bhatar CD Block had a total population of 263,064, all of which were rural. There were 134,096 (51%) males and 128,968 (49%) females. Population below 6 years was 28,732. Scheduled Castes numbered 85,325 (32.44%) and Scheduled Tribes numbered 25,626 (9.74%).

As of 2001 census, Bhatar block had a total population of 236,397, out of which 121,066 were males and 115,331 were females. Bhatar block registered a population growth of 12.33 per cent during the 1991-2001 decade. Decadal growth for Bardhaman district was 14.36 per cent. Decadal growth in West Bengal was 17.84 per cent. Scheduled castes at 77,921 formed around one-third the population. Scheduled tribes numbered 23,654.

Large villages (with 4,000+ population) in Bhatar CD Block are (2011 census figures in brackets): Orgram (13,554), Kashipur (5,457), Mahata (5,443), Eruar (10,863), Mahachanda (4,281), Karjjana (4,684), Bamshore (7,997), Muratipur (5,516), Balgona (7,203), Nityanandapur (4,760), Bhatakul (5,607), Nasigram (7,503), Bara Belun (11,261), Banpash (6,702) and Hanrgram (5,301).

Other villages in Bhatar CD Block include (2011 census figures in brackets): Bhatar (3,383), Amarun (2,639) and Bamunara (2,051).

=== Literacy ===
As per the 2011 census the total number of literates in Bhatar CD Block was 167,644 (71.56% of the population over 6 years) out of which males numbered 96,862 (77.78% of the male population over 6 years) and females numbered 74,802 (65.08% of the female population over 6 years). The gender disparity (the difference between female and male literacy rates) was 12.71%.

As of 2001 census, Bhatar block had a total literacy of 64.14% for the 6+ age group. While male literacy was 72.99% female literacy was 54.86%. Bardhaman district had a total literacy of 70.18%, male literacy being 78.63% and female literacy being 60.95%.

See also – List of West Bengal districts ranked by literacy rate

Literacy in CD blocks of
Bardhaman district
Bardhaman Sadar North subdivision
Ausgram I – 69.39%
Ausgram II – 68.00%
Bhatar – 71.56%
Burdwan I – 76.07%
Burdwan II – 74.12%
Galsi II – 70.05%
Bardhaman Sadar South subdivision
Khandaghosh – 77.28%
Raina I – 80.20%
Raina II – 81.48%
Jamalpur – 74.08%
Memari I – 74.10%
Memari II – 74.59%
Kalna subdivision
Kalna I – 75.81%
Kalna II – 76.25%
Manteswar – 73.08%
Purbasthali I – 77.59%
Purbasthali II – 70.35%
Katwa subdivision
Katwa I – 70.36%
Katwa II – 69.16%
Ketugram I – 68.00%
Ketugram II – 65.96%
Mongalkote – 67.97%
Durgapur subdivision
Andal – 77.25%
Faridpur Durgapur – 74.14%
Galsi I – 72.81%
Kanksa – 76.34%
Pandabeswar – 73.01%
Asansol subdivision
Barabani – 69.58%
Jamuria – 69.42%
Raniganj – 73.86%
Salanpur – 78.76%
2011 Census: CD Block Wise

Primary Census Abstract Data

=== Languages and religion ===
Religion in Bhatar CD block (2011)
Hinduism	73.20%
Islam	25.67%
Sarna	0.45%
Christianity	0.42%
Other or not stated	0.26%

In the 2011 census Hindus numbered 192,567 and formed 73.20% of the population in Bhatar CD Block. Muslims numbered 67,537 and formed 25.67% of the population. Christians numbered 1,097 and formed 0.42% of the population. Others numbered 1,863 and formed 0.71% of the population.

In Bardhaman district the percentage of Hindu population has been declining from 84.3% in 1961 to 77.9% in 2011 and the percentage of Muslim population has increased from 15.2% in 1961 to 20.7% in 2011.

Languages of Bhatar CD block (2011)
1. Bengali (91.6%)
2. Santali (8.21%)
3. Others (0.22%)

At the time of the 2011 census, 91.57% of the population spoke Bengali and 8.21% Santali as their first language.

== Rural poverty ==
As per poverty estimates obtained from household survey for families living below poverty line in 2005, rural poverty in Bhatar CD Block was 33.52%.

== Economy ==
=== Livelihood ===
In Bhatar CD Block in 2011, amongst the class of total workers, cultivators formed 19.01%, agricultural labourers 56.67%, household industry workers 3.20% and other workers 21.13%.

Bhatar CD Block is part of the area where agriculture dominates the scenario but the secondary and tertiary sectors have shown an increasing trend.

=== Infrastructure ===
There are 136 inhabited villages in Bhatar CD block. All 104 villages (100%) have power supply. All 104 villages (100%) have drinking water supply. 39 villages (37.50%) have post offices. 98 villages (94.23%) have telephones (including landlines, public call offices and mobile phones). 59 villages (56.73%) have a pucca (paved) approach road and 84 villages (80.77%) have transport communication (includes bus service, rail facility and navigable waterways). 20 villages (19.23%) have agricultural credit societies. 4 villages (3.85%) have banks.

In 2013–14, there were 147 fertiliser depots, 34 seed stores and 65 fair price shops in the CD Block.

=== Agriculture ===
Persons engaged in agriculture
in Bhatar CD Block
1. Bargadars (6.36%)
2. Patta holders (14.5%)
3. Small farmers (5.31%)
4. Marginal farmers (17.6%)
5. Agricultural labourers (56.3%)

Although the Bargadari Act of 1950 recognised the rights of bargadars to a higher share of crops from the land that they tilled, it was not implemented fully. Large tracts, beyond the prescribed limit of land ceiling, remained with the rich landlords. From 1977 onwards major land reforms took place in West Bengal. Land in excess of land ceiling was acquired and distributed amongst the peasants. Following land reforms land ownership pattern has undergone transformation. In 2013–14, persons engaged in agriculture in Bhatar CD Block could be classified as follows: bargadars 6.36%, patta (document) holders 14.46%, small farmers (possessing land between 1 and 2 hectares) 5.31%, marginal farmers (possessing land up to 1 hectare) 17.55% and agricultural labourers 56.32%.

In 2003-04 net cropped area in Bhatar CD Block was 34,515 hectares and the area in which more than one crop was grown was 25,500 hectares.

In 2013–14, Bhatar CD Block produced 170,832 tonnes of Aman paddy, the main winter crop, from 49,157 hectares, 82,165 tonnes of Boro paddy (spring crop) from 21,888 hectares, 52 tonnes of wheat from 28 hectares, 21,780 tonnes of potatoes from 1,492 hectares and 1,081 tonnes of sugar cane from 14 hectares. It also produced pulses and oilseeds.

In Bardhaman district as a whole Aman paddy constituted 64.32% of the total area under paddy cultivation, while the area under Boro and Aus paddy constituted 32.87% and 2.81% respectively. The expansion of Boro paddy cultivation, with higher yield rates, was the result of expansion of irrigation system and intensive cropping. In 2013–14, the total area irrigated in Bhatar CD Block was 28,857.99 hectares, out of which 28,360.80 hectares were irrigated by canal water, 437.71 hectares were irrigated by river lift irrigation and 59.48 hectares by deep tube wells.

=== Banking ===
In 2013–14, Bhatar CD Block had offices of 11 commercial banks and 5 gramin banks.

Major Banks in the vicinity include Allahabad Bank at Barabelun, State Bank of India at Bhatar.

== Transport ==
Bhatar CD Block has 9 originating/ terminating bus routes.

The Bardhaman-Katwa line after conversion from narrow gauge to electrified broad gauge was opened to the public on 12 January 2018. There are stations at Karjana, Karjanagram, Amarun, Bhatar and Balgona railway station.

State Highway 7 (West Bengal) running from Rajgram (in Birbhum district) to Midnapore (in Paschim Medinipur district) and State Highway 14 (West Bengal) running from Dubrajpur (in Birbhum district) to Betai (in Nadia district) pass through this block.

== Education ==
In 2013–14, Bhatar CD Block had 169 primary schools with 14,053 students, 20 high schools with 13,283 students and 16 higher secondary schools with 13,702 students. Bhatar CD Block had 2 technical/ professional institutions with 200 students and 457 institutions for special and non-formal education with 15,530 students

As per the 2011 census, in Bhatar CD block, amongst the 104 inhabited villages, all villages have schools, 64 villages had two or more primary schools, 39 villages had at least 1 primary and 1 middle school and 36 villages had at least 1 middle and 1 secondary school.

More than 6,000 schools (in erstwhile Bardhaman district) serve cooked midday meal to more than 900,000 students.

== Healthcare ==
In 2014, Bhatar CD Block had 1 rural hospital, 6 primary health centres and 2 private nursing homes with total 84 beds and 10 doctors (excluding private bodies). It had 38 family welfare subcentres. 7,886 patients were treated indoor and 398,904 patients were treated outdoor in the hospitals, health centres and subcentres of the CD Block.

Bhatar Rural Hospital at Bhatar (with 60 beds) is the main medical facility in Bhatar CD block. There are primary health centres at Balgona (with 2 beds), Bijipur, PO Basuda (with 6 beds), Bonpass (with 10 beds), Erruar, PO Aruarar (with 10 beds), Nasigram (with 6 beds) and Sahebganj (with 4 beds).

Bhatar CD Block is one of the areas of Bardhaman district which is affected by a low level of arsenic contamination of ground water.
