= Bardhaman–Durgapur Lok Sabha constituency =

Lok Sabha constituency in West Bengal

Coordinates: 23.4°N 87.6°E

Bardhaman–Durgapur WB-39
- Lok Sabha constituency
- Interactive Map Outlining Bardhaman-Durgapur Lok Sabha Constituency

Constituency details
- Country: India
- Region: East India
- State: West Bengal
- District: Purba Bardhaman & Pashim Bardhaman
- Assembly constituencies: Bardhaman Dakshin; Manteshwar; Bardhaman Uttar; Bhatar; Galsi; Durgapur Purba; Durgapur Paschim
- Established: 2009-present
- Total electors: 18,51,780 (2024)
- Reservation: None

Member of Parliament
- 18th Lok Sabha
- Incumbent Kirti Azad
- Party: AITC
- Alliance: INDIA
- Elected year: 2024

Bardhaman–Durgapur Lok Sabha constituency is one of the 543 parliamentary constituencies in India. The constituency is spread across Paschim Bardhaman district and Purba Bardhaman district in West Bengal. While five of the assembly seats of Bardhaman–Durgapur Lok Sabha constituency are in Purba Bardhaman district, two assembly segment is in Paschim Bardhaman district.

As per order of the Delimitation Commission in respect of the delimitation of constituencies in the West Bengal, Burdwan Lok Sabha constituency, Katwa Lok Sabha constituency and Durgapur Lok Sabha constituency ceased to exist from 2009 and new constituencies came into being: Bardhaman Purba Lok Sabha constituency and Bardhaman–Durgapur Lok Sabha constituency.

== Overview ==
Parliamentary constituencies in West Bengal - 1. Cooch Behar, 2. Alipurduars, 3. Jalpaiguri, 4. Darjeeling, 5. Raiganj, 6. Balurghat, 7. Maldaha Uttar, 8. Maldaha Dakshin, 9. Jangipur, 10. Baharampur, 11. Murshidabad, 12. Krishnanagar, 13. Ranaghat, 14. Bangaon, 15. Barrackpore, 16. Dum Dum, 17. Barasat, 18. Basirhat, 19. Jaynagar, 20. Mathurapur, 21. Diamond Harbour, 22. Jadavpur, 23. Kolkata Dakshin, 24. Kolkata Uttar, 25. Howrah, 26. Uluberia, 27. Serampore, 28. Hoghly, 29. Arambagh, 30. Tamluk, 31, Kanthi, 32. Ghatal, 33. Jhargram, 34. Medinipur, 35. Purulia, 36. Bankura, 37. Bishnupur, 38. Bardhaman Purba, 39. Bardhaman Durgapur, 40. Asansol, 41. Bolpur, 42. Birbhum

Bardhaman–Durgapur Lok Sabha constituency is a new constituency that includes both the Bardhaman and Durgapur cities and the intermediate villages. In a pre-poll feature about the constituency, The Statesman wrote, "Shivnath Ghosh, a 55-year-old farmer of Belkash village, says, ‘I want the Left Front to be removed from power at the earliest as their sons and family members grab every facility, employment and trade all across the region.’ ... Shivnath's locality has witnessed a change in the guard after the Assembly and the panchayat polls, after the storm of ‘parivartan’ but still remains gasping for a ‘real wind of change’... 'Ahead of the Lok Sabha polls, we have new zamindars in the villages, especially the ‘Red Trinamul’ cadres and they dictate the terms leaving us in absolute jeopardy.'

"The Lok Sabha constituency has 15.81 lakh voters, 72 per cent of which comprise rural voters and 7.61 lakh female voters - the highest in the district…The state’s rice bowl also houses uncountable ailing industries…Nearly 1.5 lakh persons have lost their jobs due to retrenchment caused by the collapse of industries."

== Assembly segments ==
Bardhaman–Durgapur Lok Sabha constituency (parliamentary constituency no. 39) is composed of the following assembly segments:

#	Name	District	Member	Party	2024 Lead
260	Bardhaman Dakshin	Purba Bardhaman	Moumita Biswas Mishra	BJP	AITC
263	Monteswar	Purba Bardhaman	Saikat Panja	BJP	AITC
266	Bardhaman Uttar (SC)	Purba Bardhaman	Nisith Kumar Malik	AITC	AITC
267	Bhatar	Purba Bardhaman	Soumen Karfa	BJP	AITC
274	Galsi (SC)	Purba Bardhaman	Raju Patra	BJP	AITC
276	Durgapur Purba	Paschim Bardhaman	Chandra Shekhar Banerjee	BJP	AITC
277	Durgapur Paschim	Paschim Bardhaman	Lakshman Chandra Ghorui	BJP	BJP

== Members of Parliament ==
Year	Member	Party
Till 2009 : Constituency did not exist
2009	Sheikh Saidul Haque	Communist Party of India (Marxist)
2014	Mamtaz Sanghamita	Trinamool Congress
2019	S. S. Ahluwalia	Bharatiya Janata Party
2024	Kirti Azad	Trinamool Congress

For Members of Parliament from this area in previous years see Durgapur Lok Sabha constituency, Burdwan Lok Sabha constituency and Katwa Lok Sabha constituency.

== Election results ==
=== 2024 ===
2024 Indian general elections: Bardhaman–Durgapur
Party	Candidate	Votes	%	±%
AITC	Kirti Azad	720,667	47.99	▲6.41
BJP	Dilip Ghosh	582,686	38.80	▼2.95
CPI(M)	Sukriti Ghoshal	153,829	10.24	▼1.02
NOTA	None of the above	21,595	1.44	▲0.15
Majority		137,981	9.19	
Turnout		1,501,773	81.10	▼1.56
Registered electors		1,851,780		
AITC gain from BJP		Swing	4.68	

=== 2019 ===
2019 Indian general election: Bardhaman-Durgapur
Party	Candidate	Votes	%	±%
BJP	S. S. Ahluwalia	598,376	41.75	+23.95
AITC	Dr. Mamtaz Sanghamita	595,937	41.58	−4.06
CPI(M)	Abhas Roy Chowdhury	161,329	11.26	−22.33
INC	Ranajit Mukherjee	38,516	2.69	−0.64
BSP	Ramkrishna Malik (Dev)	13,766	0.96	+0.07
SUCI(C)	Sucheta Kundu (Banerjee)	6,543	0.46	−0.10
NOTA	None of the above	18,540	1.29	
Majority		2,439	0.17	
Turnout		14,33,007	82.66	−1.40
Registered electors		17,33,578		
BJP gain from AITC		Swing	+12.01	

=== General election 2014 ===
2014 Indian general elections: Bardhaman-Durgapur
Party	Candidate	Votes	%	±%
AITC	Mamtaz Sanghamita	554,521	41.65	N/A
CPI(M)	Saidul Haque	4,47,190	33.59	−16.92
BJP	Debasree Chaudhuri	2,37,205	17.81	+13.40
INC	Pradip Agasthi	44,355	3.33	−37.65
BSP	Md. Harun	11,862	0.89	+0.05
SUCI(C)	Sunil Kumar Purkait	7,574	0.56	N/A
BMP	Dr. Dhanapati Das	6,665	0.50	N/A
Independent	Saradamoni Samanta	4,984	0.37	N/A
Majority		1,07,331	8.06	−1.47
Turnout		13,31,242	84.07	+0.20
AITC gain from CPI(M)		Swing	+33.19	

=== General election 2009 ===
2009 Indian general elections: Bardhaman-Durgapur
Party	Candidate	Votes	%	±%
CPI(M)	Saidul Haque	573,399	50.52	
INC	Nargis Begam	4,65,162	40.98	
BJP	Syed Ali Afzal Chand	50,081	4.41	
Independent	Shyamali Roy Chowdhury	13,316	1.17	
AUDF	Madhu Sudan Shet	13,018	1.14	
BSP	Shiba Pada Biswas	9,627	0.84	
RDMP	Suman Sarkar	5,826	0.46	
SP	Ashoke Taru Mallick	5,099	0.44	
Majority		1,08,237	9.53	
Turnout		11,35,028	83.87	
CPI(M) win (new seat)				

== See also ==
- List of constituencies of the Lok Sabha
