= Bhatar Assembly constituency =

Bhatar
- Constituency No. 267 for the West Bengal Legislative Assembly
- Interactive Map Outlining Bhatar Assembly Constituency

Constituency details
- Country: India
- Region: East India
- State: West Bengal
- District: Purba Bardhaman
- Lok Sabha constituency: Bardhaman–Durgapur
- Established: 1957
- Total electors: 197,538
- Reservation: None

Member of Legislative Assembly
- 18th West Bengal Legislative Assembly
- Incumbent Soumen Karfa
- Party: BJP
- Alliance: NDA
- Elected year: 2026

Bhatar Assembly constituency is an assembly constituency in Purba Bardhaman district in the Indian state of West Bengal.

== Overview ==
As per orders of the Delimitation Commission, No. 267 Bhatar assembly constituency covers Bhatar community development block and Kurman I and Kshetia gram panchayats of Burdwan I CD Block.

Bhatar assembly segment was earlier part of Burdwan Lok Sabha constituency. As per orders of Delimitation Commission it is part of No. 39 Bardhaman–Durgapur Lok Sabha constituency.

== Members of the Legislative Assembly ==
Year	Name	Party
1957	Abhalata Kundu	Indian National Congress
1962	Ashwini Roy	Communist Party of India
1967	S. Hazra	Indian National Congress
1969	Ashwini Roy	Communist Party of India
1971	Anath Bandhu Ghose	Communist Party of India (Marxist)
1972	Bholanath Sen	Indian National Congress
1977	Bholanath Sen	Indian National Congress
1982	Syed Mohammad Mashi	Communist Party of India (Marxist)
1987	Syed Mohammad Mashi	Communist Party of India (Marxist)
1991	Mahboob Zahedi	Communist Party of India (Marxist)
1996	Subhash Mondal	Communist Party of India (Marxist)
2001	Subhash Mondal	Communist Party of India (Marxist)
2006	Syed Mohammad Mashi	Communist Party of India (Marxist)
2011	Banamali Hazra	Trinamool Congress
2016	Subhash Mondal	Trinamool Congress
2021	Mangobinda Adhikari	Trinamool Congress
2026	Soumen Karfa	Bharatiya Janata Party

== Election results ==
=== 2026 ===
2026 West Bengal Legislative Assembly election: Bhatar
Party	Candidate	Votes	%	±%
BJP	Soumen Karfa	98,820	46.03	▲10.41
AITC	Shantanu Koner	92,292	42.99	▼7.45
CPI(M)	Hasina Khatun	12,839	5.98	▼3.17
Independent	Somnath Sain	3,307	1.54	
NOTA	None of the above	3,252	1.51	▼0.52
Majority		6,528	3.04	▼11.78
Turnout		214,694	94.65	▲7.83
BJP gain from AITC		Swing		

=== 2021 ===
2021 West Bengal Legislative Assembly election: Bhatar
Party	Candidate	Votes	%	±%
AITC	Mangobinda Adhikari	108,028	50.44	▲3.58
BJP	Mahendranath Kowar	76,287	35.62	▲29.06
CPI(M)	Nazrul Hoque	19,607	9.15	▼34.53
NOTA	None of the above	4,346	2.03	
Majority		31,741	14.82	
Turnout		214,168	86.82	
AITC hold		Swing		

=== 2016 ===
2016 West Bengal Legislative Assembly election: Bhatar
Party	Candidate	Votes	%	±%
AITC	Subhash Mondal	92,544	46.86	▼0.43
CPI(M)	Bamacharan Banerjee	86,264	43.68	▼3.44
BJP	Anjan Mukherjee	12,950	6.56	▲3.41
BSP	Dhananjay Ghoshal	2,176	1.10	▲0.05
NOTA	None of the above	2,108	1.07	New entry
Independent	Santosh Nandi	1,438	0.73	New entry
Majority		6,280	3.18	▲3.01
Turnout		1,97,480	87.18	▼2.55
AITC hold		Swing		

=== 2011 ===
2011 West Bengal Legislative Assembly election: Bhatar
Party	Candidate	Votes	%	±%
AITC	Banamali Hazra	83,883	47.29	
CPI(M)	Srijit Konar	83,585	47.12	
BJP	Dhatripada Konyar	5,586	3.15	
PDCI	Iyar Mohammad Sheikh	2,469	1.39	
BSP	Sheikh Toyeb	1,854	1.05	
Majority		298	0.17	
Turnout		1,77,377	89.73	
AITC gain from CPI(M)		Swing		

=== 2006 ===
Syed Md. Masih of CPI (M) won the Bhatar assembly seat in 2006 defeating his nearest rival Banamali Hajra of Trinamool Congress. Contests in most years were multi cornered but only winners and runners are being mentioned. In 2001 and 1996, Subhash Mondal of CPI (M) defeated Banamali Hajra of Trinamool Congress and Susanta Ghosh of Congress, in respective years. In 1991, Mahboob Zahedi of CPI (M) defeated Bholanath Sen of Congress. In 1987 and 1982, Syed Md. Masih of CPI (M) defeated Banamali Hajra and Bholanath Sen, both of Congress, in the respective years. In 1977, Bholanath Sen defeated Saktipada Chattopdahyay of Forward Bloc.

=== 1972 ===
Bholanath Sen of Congress won the seat in 1972. Anath Bandhu Ghosh of CPI (M) won it in 1971. In 1969, Aswini Roy of CPI won the seat. S.Hazra of Congress, won it in 1967. Aswini Roy, representing CPI won it in 1962. The constituency was formed in 1957. It was won in that year by Abalata Kundu of Congress.
