= Bally, Bally-Jagachha =

Bally Bali
- Census Town
- Location in West Bengal, India Bally (West Bengal) Bally (India)
- Coordinates: 22°37′46″N 88°20′53″E
- Country: India
- State: West Bengal
- District: Howrah

Population (2011)
  - Total: 113,377

Languages
  - Official: Bengali, English
- Time zone: UTC+5:30 (IST)
- PIN: 711201, 711202, 711205, 711227
- Vehicle registration: WB
- Lok Sabha constituency: Sreerampur
- Vidhan Sabha constituency: Domjur
- Website: howrah.gov.in

Bally (also known as Bali) is a census town in Bally Jagachha CD Block of Howrah Sadar subdivision in Howrah district in the Indian state of West Bengal. Bally is under the jurisdiction of Nischinda Police Station of Howrah City Police.

== Demographics ==
As per 2011 Census of India Bally had a total population of 113,377 of which 58,530 (52%) were males and 54,847 (48%) were females. Population below 6 years was 10,069. The total number of literates in Bally was 92,238 (89.28% of the population over 6 years).

As per 2001 census, Bally had a population of 92,906, out of which 49,414 were males and 43,492 were females. Bally has an average literacy rate of 79%, higher than the national average of 59.5%: male literacy is 84% and female literacy is 75%. In Bally, 9% of the population is under 6 years of age.

== Transport ==
Bally has the junction of National Highway 16 (part of Asian Highway 45) and National Highway 19 at Bamandanga (Rajchandrapur). People can go to several places of Kolkata, Howrah and Hooghly from here. Bally is connected to Dakshineswar, Kolkata via Vivekananda Setu and Nivedita Setu.

=== Bus ===
==== Private Bus ====
- 26 Champadanga - Bonhooghly
- 26C Jagatballavpur - Bonhooghly
- 40 Birshibpur - Serampore
- 51 Pardankuni - Howrah Station
- 79 Panchla - Dunlop
- 81/1 Rajchandrapur - Barasat
- DN46 Dankuni Housing - Salt Lake Karunamoyee
- 54 Ballykhal - Esplanade

==== CSTC Bus ====
- S23A Rajchandrapur - Salt Lake Karunamoyee
- AC23A Rajchandrapur - Salt Lake Karunamoyee
- AC50A Rajchandrapur - Garia

==== CTC Bus ====
- C23 Park Circus - Dankuni
- ACT-23 Park Circus - Dankuni

Many Shuttle Buses (Without Numbers) also pass through Bally.

=== Train ===
Bally has five railway stations of Kolkata Suburban Railway. They are Bally railway station (on Howrah-Bardhaman main line and Howrah-Bardhaman chord line), Belanagar railway station (on Howrah-Bardhaman chord line), Bally Ghat railway station, Bally Halt railway station and Rajchandrapur railway station (on Sealdah-Dankuni line).

=== Airport ===
Nearest Airport of Bally is Netaji Subhas Chandra Bose International Airport in Dumdum, Kolkata and it is easily accessible via Belghoria Expressway.
