= Porabazar railway station =

Railway station in West Bengal, India

Porabazar
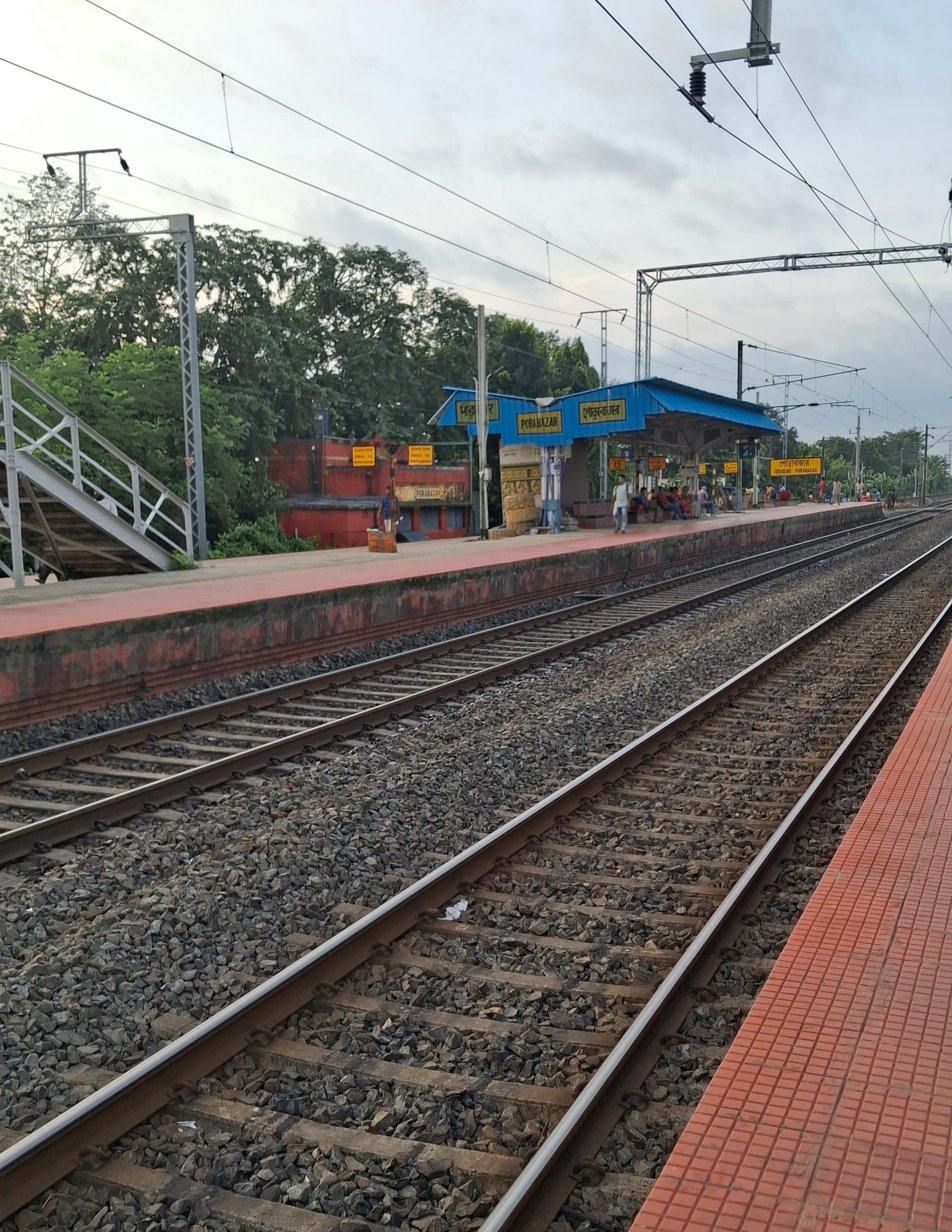

General information
- Location: Porabazar Makalpur Road, Nakira Para, Hooghly district, West Bengal; India
- Coordinates: 22°55′02″N 88°09′33″E
- Elevation: 13 metres (43 ft)
- System: Kolkata Suburban Railway
- Owner: Indian Railways
- Operator: Eastern Railway
- Line: Howrah–Bardhaman chord
- Platforms: 3
- Tracks: 3

Construction
- Structure type: Standard (on ground station)
- Parking: No

Other information
- Status: Functioning
- Station code: PBZ
- Division(s): Howrah

History
- Opened: 1917
- Electrified: 1964
- Former names: East Indian Railway Company

Services
Preceding station	Kolkata Suburban Railway	Following station
Chandanpur towards Howrah Junction	Eastern Line Howrah–Bardhaman chord	Belmuri towards Barddhaman Junction
Route map
Location
- Location within West Bengal Location within India

Porabazar railway station is a Kolkata Suburban Railway station on the Howrah–Bardhaman chord line operated by Eastern Railway zone of Indian Railways. It is situated beside Porabazar Makalpur Road, Nakira Para in Hooghly district in the Indian state of West Bengal.

== History ==
The Howrah–Bardhaman chord, the 95 kilometers railway line was constructed in 1917. It was connected with Sealdah through Dankuni after construction of Vivekananda Setu in 1932. Howrah to Bardhaman chord line including Porabazar railway station was electrified in 1964–66.
