= Dakshineswar railway station =

Railway station in West Bengal, India

Dakshineswar
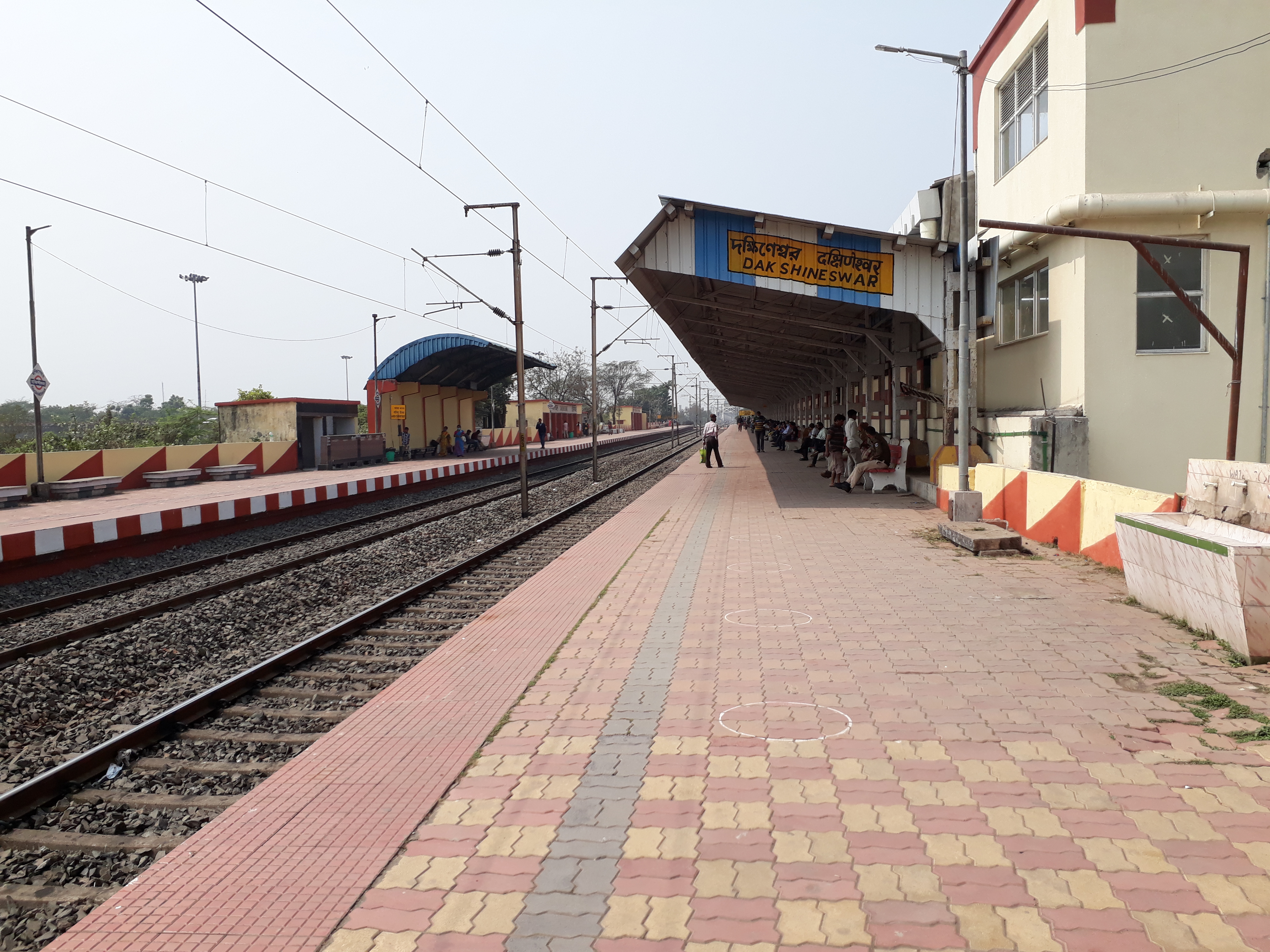
- Dakshineswar railway station

General information
- Location: Dakshineswar, Kolkata, West Bengal 700076; India
- Coordinates: 22.653799°N 88.363676°E
- Elevation: 8 metres (26 ft)
- System: Indian Railways and Kolkata Suburban Railway station
- Owner: Indian Railways
- Operator: Eastern Railway
- Platforms: 2 (Side platforms)
- Tracks: 2
- Connections: Dakshineswar; Dakshineswar Bus Terminal

Construction
- Structure type: At grade
- Parking: Not available
- Cycle facilities: Not available
- Accessible: Not available

Other information
- Status: Functioning
- Station code: DAKE
- Zone(s): Eastern Railway
- Division(s): Sealdah

History
- Opened: 1932; 94 years ago
- Electrified: 1964–65
- Former names: Eastern Bengal Railway

Services
Preceding station	Kolkata Suburban Railway	Following station
Baranagar Road towards Sealdah	Chord link Line	Bally Ghat towards Dankuni Junction
Route map
Location
- Location within Kolkata Location within West Bengal Location within India

Dakshineswar is a railway station on the Sealdah–Dankuni line in Dakshineswar. The Dakshineswar metro station is adjacent to Dakshineswar railway station. It serves the local areas of Dakshineswar in North 24 Parganas district in West Bengal, India.

== History ==
Sealdah–Dankuni line was opened in 1932 by the Eastern Bengal Railway. The line was electrified in 1965.

== The station ==
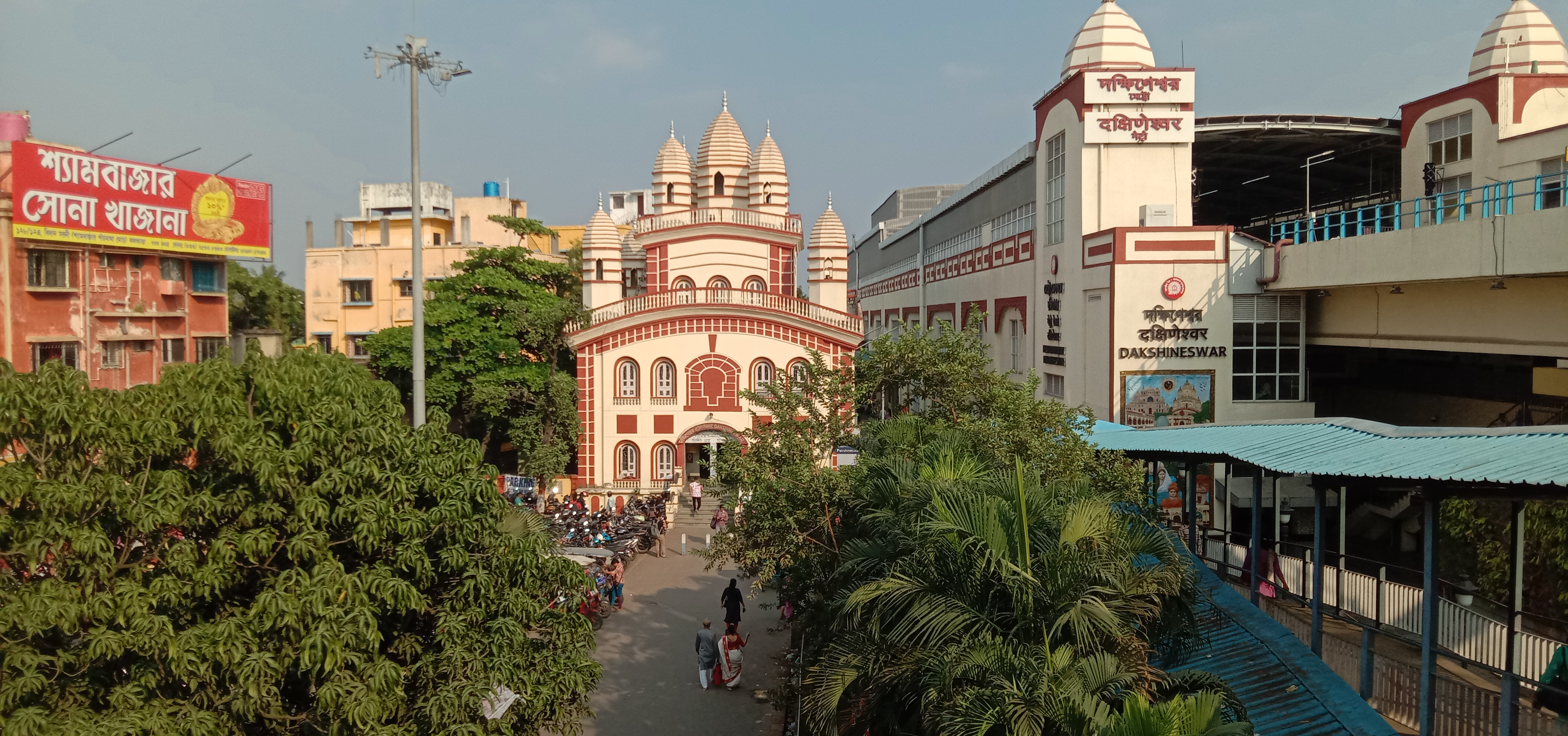
Dakshineswar Railway Station (in middle) building built as a replica of the iconic Dakshineswar Temple, and the Dakshineswar metro station (in right) in Kolkata, West Bengal, India.

=== Station layout ===
==== Platform layout ====
G	Street level	Exit/Entrance
P1	Side platform No- 1, doors will open on the left
P1		Towards →Dankuni→ →
	Towards ←Sealdah← ←
P2	Side platform No- 2, doors will open on the left

== Major trains ==
- Sealdah–Alipurduar Kanchan Kanya Express
- Sealdah–Bamanhat Uttar Banga Express
- Sealdah–Silchar Kanchenjunga Express
- Kolkata–Jammu Tawi Express
- Sealdah–Agartala Kanchenjunga Express
- Kolkata - Darbhanga Maithili Express
