= Bally Ghat railway station =

Railway station in West Bengal, India

Bally Ghat
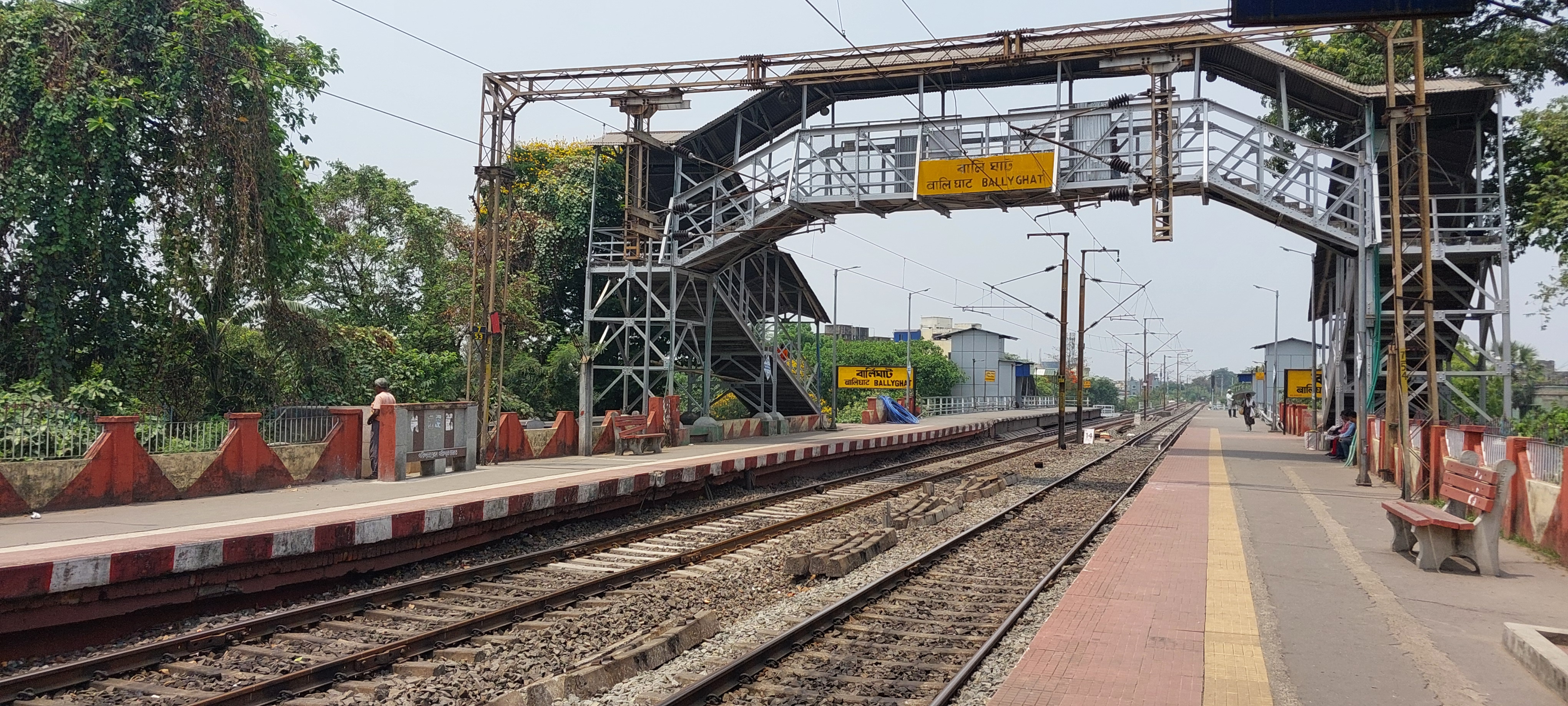
- Bally Ghat railway station

General information
- Location: Bally, Howrah, West Bengal; India
- Coordinates: 22.652433°N 88.348028°E
- Elevation: 15 metres (49 ft)
- System: Kolkata Suburban Railway
- Owner: Indian Railways
- Operator: Eastern Railway
- Platforms: 2 (Side platforms)
- Tracks: 2
- Connections: 54 Bus Stand; Bally Ghat Auto Stand

Construction
- Structure type: At grade
- Parking: Not available
- Cycle facilities: Not available
- Accessible: Not available

Other information
- Status: Functioning
- Station code: BLYH
- Zone(s): Eastern Railway
- Division(s): Sealdah

History
- Opened: 1865; 161 years ago
- Electrified: 1964–65
- Former names: Eastern Bengal Railway

Services
Preceding station	Kolkata Suburban Railway	Following station
Dakshineswar towards Sealdah	Chord link Line	Bally Halt towards Dankuni Junction
Route map
Location
- Location within Kolkata Location within West Bengal Location within India

Bally Ghat railway station is a station of Eastern Railway in Howrah. It is 15 km away from Sealdah and 7 km from Dankuni Junction on the Sealdah–Dankuni line of Eastern Railway. It is part of the Kolkata Suburban Railway system. Dankuni and Bardhaman local trains connect this place to Sealdah Station and other stations of the Sealdah main line. It is an important railway station between Dum Dum and Dankuni.

== History ==
Sealdah–Dankuni line was opened in 1932 by the Eastern Bengal Railway. The line was electrified on 1965.

== The station ==
=== Station layout ===
==== Platform layout ====
G	Street level	Exit/Entrance
P1	Side platform No- 1, doors will open on the left
P1		Towards →Dankuni→ →
	Towards ←Sealdah← ←
P2	Side platform No- 2, doors will open on the left
