= Bally, Howrah =

Bally
- Neighbourhood
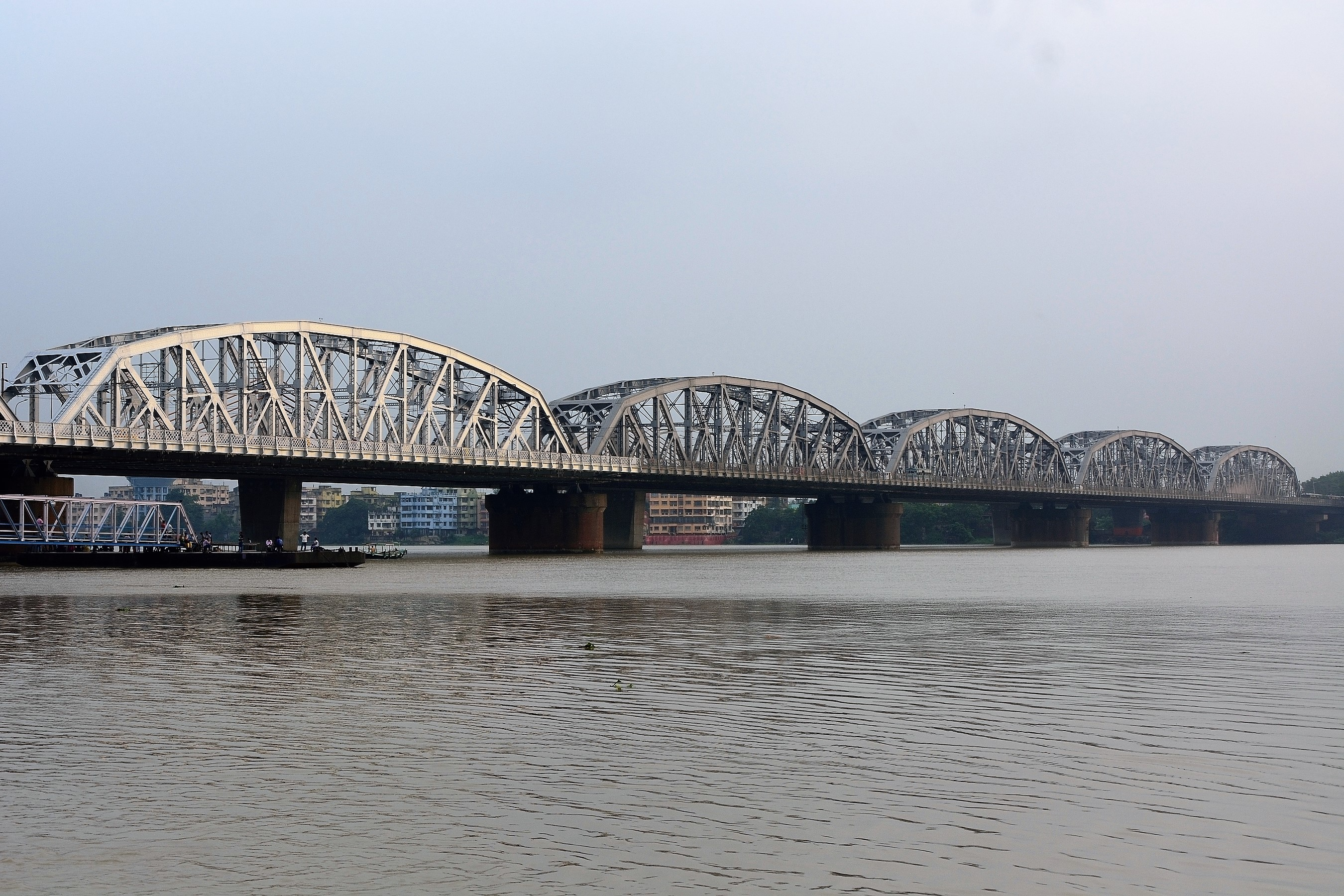
- The Bally Bridge linking Howrah to Kolkata

- Location in West Bengal, India Bally (West Bengal) Bally (India)
- Coordinates: 22.65°N 88.34°E
- Country: India
- State: West Bengal
- Division: Presidency
- District: Howrah
- City: Howrah
- Metro Station: Dakshineswar

Government
  - Type: Municipal Corporation
  - Body: Howrah Municipal Corporation
- Elevation: 15 m (49 ft)

Languages
  - Official: Bengali, English
- Time zone: UTC+5:30 (IST)
- PIN: 711201, 711202
- Telephone code: +91 33
- Vehicle registration: WB
- HMC wards: 51, 52, 53, 54
- Lok Sabha constituency: Howrah
- Vidhan Sabha constituency: Bally

Bally is a neighbourhood in Howrah of Howrah district in the Indian state of West Bengal. Bally is under the jurisdiction of Bally Police Station of Howrah City Police. It is a part of the area covered by Kolkata Metropolitan Development Authority (KMDA).

== Geography ==
Bally is located at 22.65°N 88.34°E and also the northernmost part of Howrah city. It has an average elevation of 15 metres (49 feet). It is more elevated in the west than the east (where flows the Hoogly river), thus leading to a problem of water logging. Bally is separated from Uttarpara, Hooghly, by Bally Canal (Bally Khal) at its north. A Bridge was constructed over Bally Canal in 1846 to join the two localities.

== Transport ==
An important transportation hub of Kolkata, Bally is connected to Dakshineswar, Kolkata via Vivekananda Setu and Nivedita Setu. State Highway 6/ Grand Trunk Road and Belghoria Expressway also pass through Bally. From here, people can avail a number of buses to go to Kolkata (via Vivekananda Setu), Howrah (via National Highway 16) and Hooghly (via National Highway 19).

Bally also has three railway stations of Kolkata Suburban Railway. They are Bally railway station (on Howrah-Bardhaman main line and Howrah-Bardhaman chord line), Bally Ghat railway station and Bally Halt railway station (on Sealdah-Dankuni line).

Nearest Airport of Bally is Netaji Subhas Chandra Bose International Airport in Dumdum, Kolkata. It is located approximately 12 to 14 kilometers away.

== See also ==
- Belur Math
- Kaleshwar Mandir
- Liluah
- Vivekananda Setu
