= Rajchandrapur railway station =

Railway station in West Bengal, India

Rajchandrapur
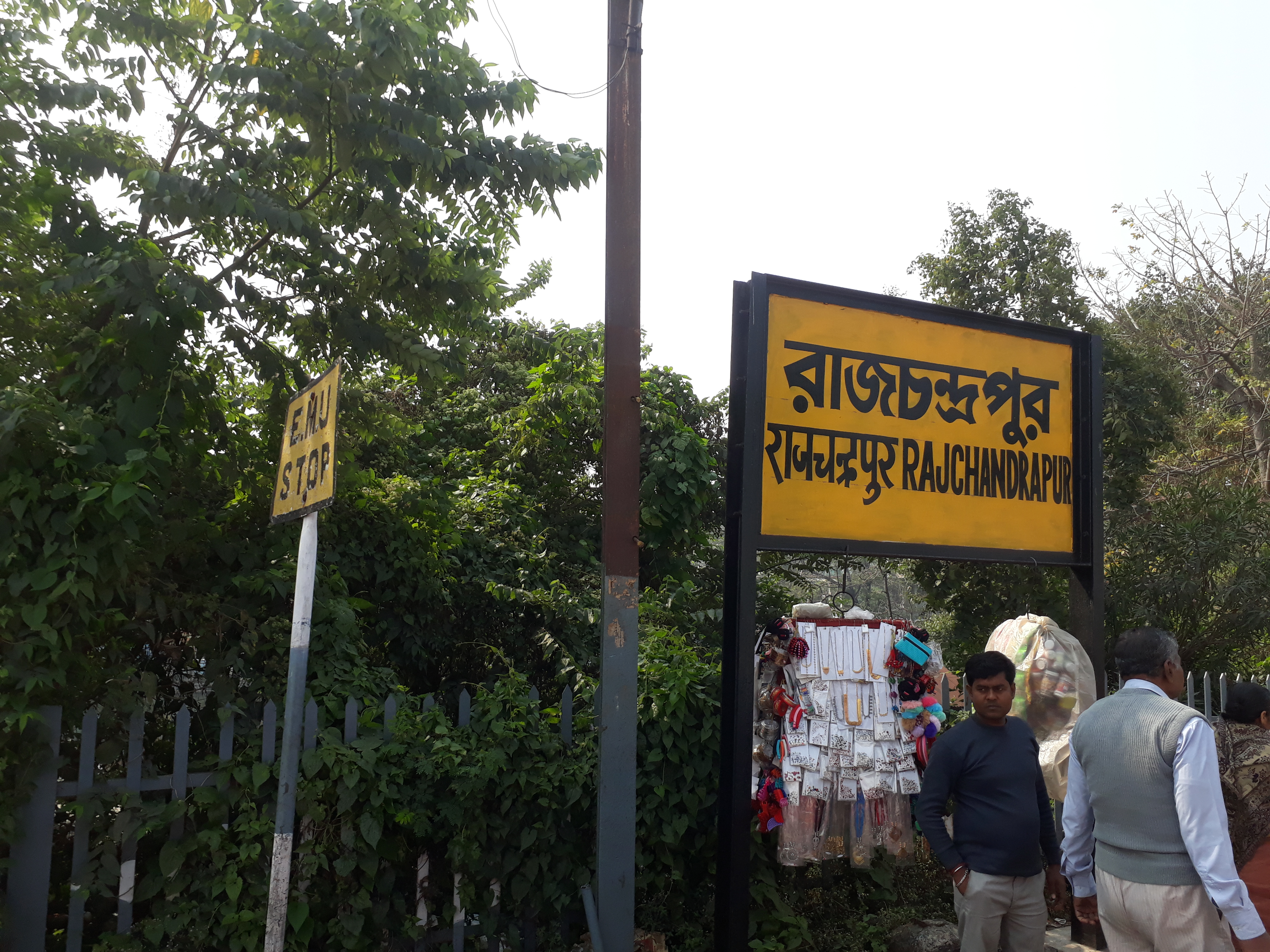
- Rajchandrapur railway station

General information
- Location: National Highway 34 (old), Ghoshpara, Bally Jagachha Block, Howrah district, West Bengal; India
- Coordinates: 22.652908°N 88.320868°E
- Elevation: 10 metres (33 ft)
- System: Kolkata Suburban Railway station
- Owner: Indian Railways
- Operator: Eastern Railway
- Platforms: 2 (Side platforms)
- Tracks: 2

Construction
- Structure type: At grade
- Parking: Not available
- Cycle facilities: Not available
- Accessible: Not available

Other information
- Status: Functioning
- Station code: RCD
- Zone(s): Eastern Railway
- Division(s): Howrah

History
- Opened: 1932; 94 years ago
- Electrified: 1964–65
- Former names: Eastern Bengal Railway

Services
Preceding station	Kolkata Suburban Railway	Following station
Bally Halt towards Sealdah	Chord link Line	Bhattanagar towards Andul
Bally Halt towards Sealdah	Chord link Line	Dankuni Junction Terminus
Route map
Location
- Location within Kolkata Location within West Bengal Location within India

Rajchandrapur railway station is a station of Eastern Railway. It is 17 km away from Sealdah and 5 km from Dankuni Junction on the Sealdah–Dankuni line of Eastern Railway. It is a part of the Kolkata Suburban Railway system. Dankuni and Bardhaman local train connects this place to Sealdah Station and other stations of the Sealdah main line. It is an important railway station between Dum Dum and Dankuni railway stations.

== History ==
Sealdah–Dankuni line was opened in 1932 by the Eastern Bengal Railway. The line was electrified on 1965.

== The station ==
=== Station layout ===
==== Platform layout ====
G	Street level	Exit/Entrance
P1	Side platform No- 1, doors will open on the left
P1		Towards →Dankuni→ →
	Towards ←Sealdah← ←
P2	Side platform No- 2, doors will open on the left
