= Kaleshwar Mandir =

Kalyaneshwar Mandir is a Shiva temple in Bally, Howrah, West Bengal, India. It is around 400 years old, and is visited by millions of monks and devotees each year.

== History ==
The structure is said to have been started by the Pandavas, and subsequently continued by the Katoch Dynasty. According to legend, Ramakrishna Paramhansa used to visit the temple frequently with his followers and the founder members of Ramakrishna Mission, including Swami Vivekananda and Swami Brahmananda. The temple is still visited by the monks of Ramakrishna Mission.
