= Sealdah–Jangipur Road Express =

Railway service in West Bengal, India

Overview
- Service type: Express train (in 2022)
- Locale: West Bengal
- Current operator: ER

Route
- Termini: Sealdah (SDAH); Jangipur (JRLE)
- Stops: 51
- Distance travelled: 259 km (161 mi)
- Average journey time: 6hr 10mins
- Service frequency: Daily
- Train numbers: 13177; 13178

On-board services
- Class: Second class (Unreserved)
- Seating arrangements: Yes
- Sleeping arrangements: No
- Catering facilities: No
- Baggage facilities: Below seat

Technical
- Rolling stock: ICF rake
- Electrification: 25 kV AC
- Operating speed: 110 km/h (68 mph) (top operating speed); 42 km/h (26 mph) (average including halts).

Sealdah-Jangipur Road Express is an unreserved express train service operated in West Bengal, India. It connects from Sealdah (in Kolkata) to Jangipur (in Murshidabad).

== History ==
The inaugural run of this train was on 19 February 2012. It used to run on a local MEMU train with train no. 63177/63178. In 2022, the train was converted to ICF express.

== Locomotive ==
The Express is regularly hauled by WAP 7 electric locomotives from the Sealdah Loco Shed.

== Coach composition ==
The express train has ten unreserved second-class coaches and two luggage-cum disabled coaches.

| SDAH/WAP-7	1	2	3	4	5	6	7	8	9	10	11	12
13177	SLR	D1	D2	D3	D4	D5	D6	D7	D8	D9	D10	SLR
13178	SLR	D10	D9	D8	D7	D6	D5	D4	D3	D2	D1	SLR

== Service ==
The Express operates every day, covering a distance of 259 km (161 mi) in a travel time of 06 hrs 10 mins with an average speed of 42 km/h (26 mph). Maximum Permissible Speed (MPS) given is 110 km/h (68 mph).
