= Calcutta Chord link line =

Suburban railway system in Kolkata

Calcutta Chord link line (incl. A.C.C. link branch line)

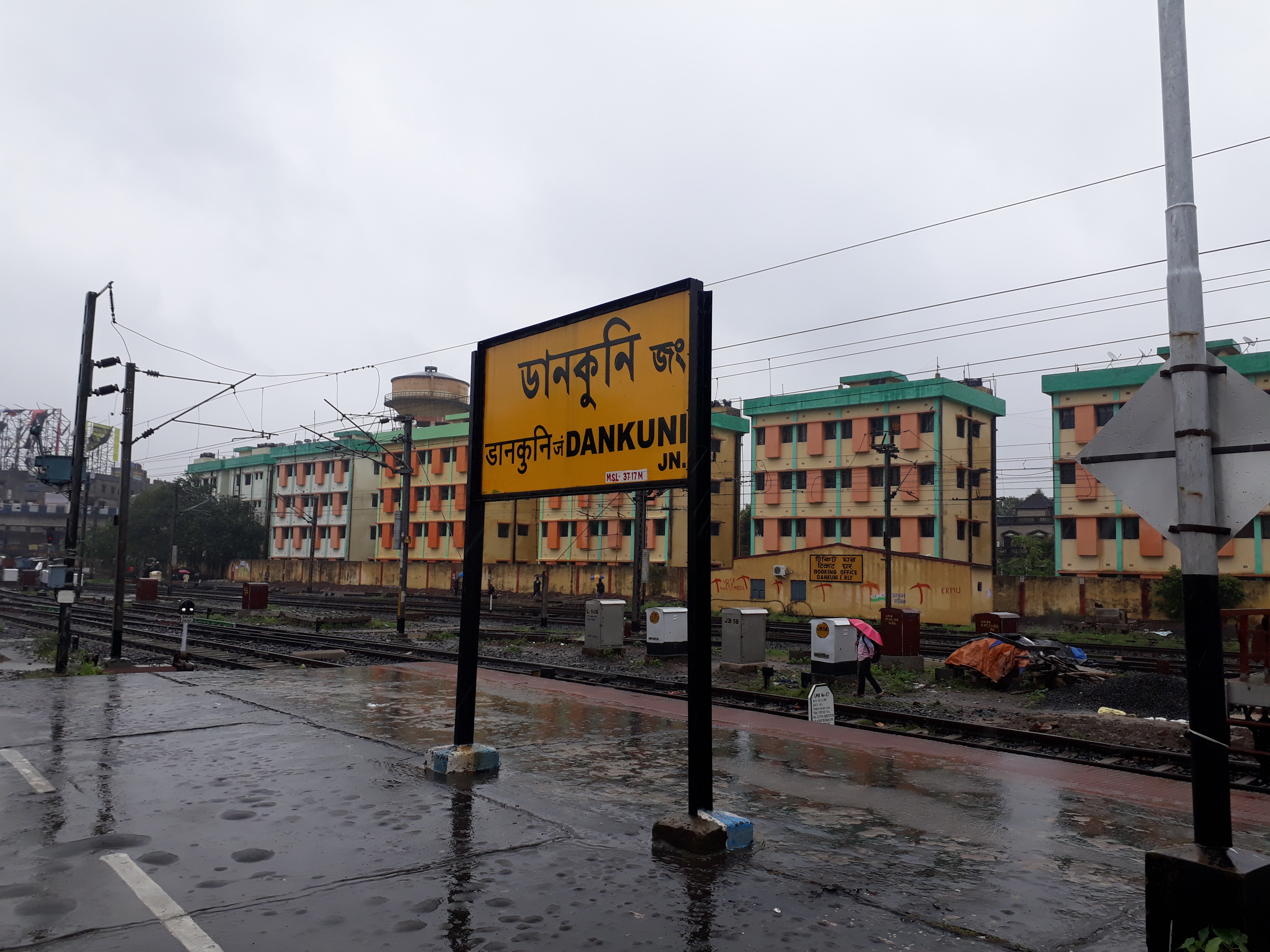
- Dankuni railway station, terminal station in Chord Link line

Overview
- Status: Operational
- Owner: Indian Railway
- Locale: West Bengal
- Termini: Sealdah; Dankuni Junction
- Stations: Total stations:15; Interchange stations: 8
- Website: Eastern Railway

Service
- Type: Commuter rail
- System: Kolkata Suburban Railway
- Operator: Eastern Railway
- Depot: Sealdah
- Daily ridership: 0.291 Million

History
- Opened: 1932; 94 years ago

Technical
- Line length: 22 km (14 mi)
- Number of tracks: 2
- Character: At grade, elevated
- Track gauge: 5 ft 6 in (1,676 mm) broad gauge
- Electrification: 25 kV overhead line
- Operating speed: up to 100 km per hour

The Calcutta Chord link line, also known as the C.C. link line, is a 22 km (14 mi) long branch line of the Kolkata Suburban Railway which comes under the jurisdiction of Eastern Railway's Sealdah Division & Howrah Division.

The line directly connects the Sealdah railway station (erstwhile Calcutta railway station) on the east bank of the Hooghly River with the Howrah–Bardhaman chord line at the Dankuni Junction on the west bank of the Hooghly River via the Vivekananda Setu. The Andul Calcutta Chord link branch line (known as the A.C.C.L. branch line) is a 9 km (5.6 mi) long branch line from Dankuni Junction which connects C.C. link line with the Santragachi–Amta branch line and Andul on the Howrah–Kharagpur line.

== Services ==
The C.C link line serves as a vital link for the city of Kolkata to the rest of the country providing a shorter route through the Howrah–Bardhaman chord line rather than the longer route through the Howrah-Bardhaman main line via the Naihati–Bandel branch line. The line is used by major long distance express services such as the Sealdah Rajdhani Express, Darjeeling Mail, Padatik Express, and Ananya Express amongst many others, originating from the Sealdah and Kolkata railway stations, to the rest of India. The line is also a part of the Kolkata Suburban Railway and is served by 46 Daily and 40 Sunday EMU services running between Sealdah and Dankuni and 2 EMU services between Sealdah and Baruipara. These suburban services are provided by 9-car EMU rakes from the Narkeldanga EMU Carshed.

The line also acts as an important link for freight commodities coming in and out of the Kolkata Port connecting it with the rest of the country. The A.C.C.L branch line was primarily built and used for diverting freight trains of the South Eastern Railway from the Howrah–Kharagpur line towards Chitpur and Kolkata docks. With increasing public demand, some long-distance passenger trains were started in this section directly from Sealdah to connect to the Howrah–Kharagpur line, like the Sealdah–Puri Duronto Express. More recently the line has been used by many long distance passenger trains such as the Kaziranga Express, Aronai Express and others from the Howrah–Kharagpur line to completely bypass the congested sections near Howrah while using Dankuni or Bhattanagar stations as commercial stoppages instead.

== History ==
The Howrah-Bardhaman Chord, a shorter link to Bardhaman from Howrah than the Howrah-Bardhaman Main Line, was constructed in 1917. In 1932, the Calcutta Chord Link Line was built over the Willingdon Bridge (now known as Vivekananda Setu) joining Dum Dum with Dankuni and opened for freight traffic, thus forming a direct link from Calcutta (now known as Sealdah railway station) to Dankuni on the Howrah-Bardhaman Chord, thus earning the line its name.

By 1950–51, Santragachi was heavily congested causing delays in arrival for trains bound to Howrah. Two major reasons identified for the congestion were its railway yard outstripping its capacity and passing of freight trains of the South Eastern Railway from Kharagpur towards Chitpur and Kolkata docks taking the circuitous route via Tikiapara, Liluah, Belanagar and then finally taking the Calcutta Chord link line to Calcutta.

To resolve the congestion problem, Indian Railways sanctioned the remodeling of the Santragachi railway yard in November 1962 and sanctioned the building of a direct link from Andul on the Howrah–Kharagpur line to the Calcutta Chord link line in the railway budget of 1959–60. This was to reduce the distance between Andul and the Calcutta Chord from 27.5 km (17.1 mi) to 13 km (8.1 mi).

The work of building the line however progressed slowly due to land acquisition problems and was finally completed in December 1968. The electrification of the line was started subsequently and was completed by 1971–72.

The ACCL branch line was primarily used by freight trains to bypass the congested sections near Howrah and directly connected the Eastern railway and South Eastern railway zones. However, with increasing public demand, some long-distance passenger trains were started in this section directly from Sealdah like the Sealdah–Puri Duronto Express in 2012.

== Tracks and electrification ==
The Dum Dum-Dankuni section was electrified in 1964–65. The Andul-Dankuni section was electrified in 1971–72.

The doubling of the Dankuni-Bhattanagar section of the ACCL line was sanctioned on 2013. The track doubling of the Andul–Baltikuri section was completed & commissioned on 25 January 2020. With the completion of the track doubling of Baltikuri–Bhattanagar section in October 2021, the entire ACCL branch line was doubled. This removed a critical bottleneck affecting interchange of trains between Eastern Railway and South Eastern Railway.

== Routes and stations ==
=== Calcutta Chord link line ===
Calcutta Chord link line
#	Distance from Sealdah Main and North (km)	Station name	Station code	Connections	Station Category
1	0	Sealdah	SDAH	Sealdah South section	NSG-1
2	2	Kankurgachi Road Junction	KGK	Circular	HG-3
2	5	Bidhannagar Road	BNXR	Circular line	SG-2
3	7	Dum Dum Junction	DDJ	Sealdah–Bangaon/ Sealdah–Ranaghat line / Dum Dum / Circular	SG-2
4	12	Baranagar Road	BARN	Baranagar	SG-3
5	13	Dakshineswar	DAKE	Dakshineswar	SG-3
6	15	Bally Ghat	BLYG	–	SG-3
7	16	Bally Halt	BLYH	–	HG-3
8	17	Rajchandrapur	RCD	–	HG-3
9	22	Dankuni Junction	DKAE	Howrah–Barddhaman chord line	SG-3

=== Andul Calcutta Chord Link branch line (ACCL branch line) ===
Andul Calcutta Chord Link branch line (ACCL branch line)
#	Distance from Dankuni (km)	Station name	Station code	Connections	Station Category
1	0	Dankuni Junction	DKAE	Howrah–Barddhaman chord line	SG-3
2	6	Bhattanagar	BTNG	–	HG-3
3	9	Baltikuri	BALT	Santragachi–Amta branch line	HG-3
4	11	Bankranayabaz	BKNM	Santragachi–Amta branch line / Howrah–Kharagpur line	SG-3
5	14	Andul	ADL	Howrah–Kharagpur line	SG-3
