= Sealdah–Puri Duronto Express =

Indian high-speed rail service

Sealdah - Puri Duronto Express

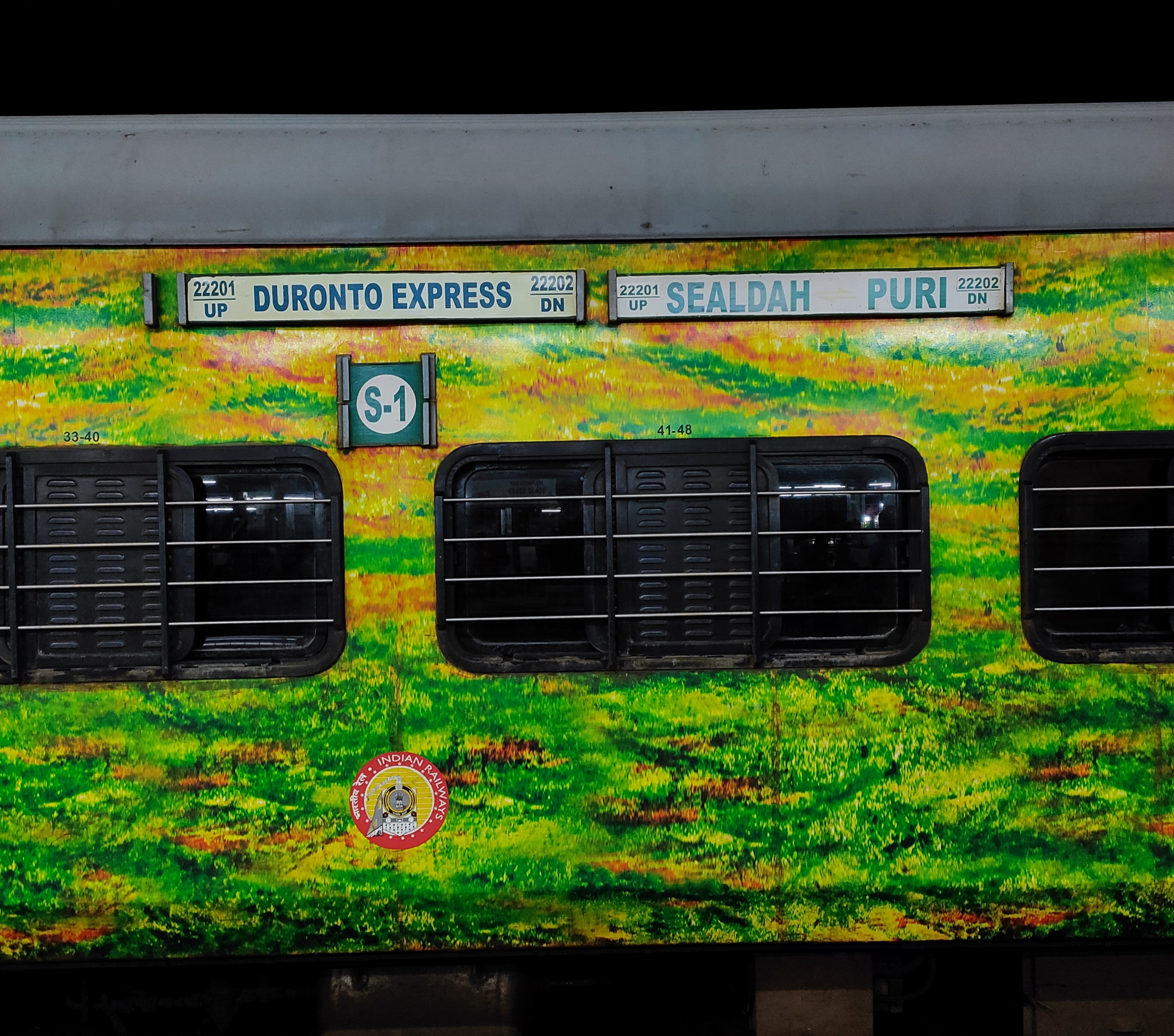

Overview
- Service type: Duronto Express
- First service: February 12, 2012; 14 years ago
- Current operator: Eastern Railways

Route
- Termini: Sealdah; Puri
- Stops: 2
- Distance travelled: 522 km (324 mi)
- Average journey time: 8 hours (Approx.)
- Service frequency: 3 days a week.
- Train number: 22201 / 22202

On-board services
- Classes: AC 1st Class, AC 2 tier, AC 3 tier, Sleeper Class, Second Class seating reserved (2S)
- Seating arrangements: Yes
- Sleeping arrangements: Yes
- Auto-rack arrangements: No
- Catering facilities: Yes
- Observation facilities: Large windows
- Baggage facilities: Overhead bins

Technical
- Rolling stock: LHB coach
- Track gauge: 1,676 mm (5 ft 6 in)
- Operating speed: 64.25 km/h (40 mph)

The 22201/22202 Sealdah-Puri Duronto Express is a Superfast Express express train of the Duronto Express category belonging to Indian Railways - Eastern Railway zone that runs between Sealdah and Puri in India.

It operates as train number 22201 from Sealdah to Puri and as train number 22202 in the reverse direction serving the states of West Bengal & Odisha.

== Coaches ==
The 22201 / 02 Sealdah Puri Duronto Express presently has 1 AC First Class, 1 AC 2 tier, 4 AC 3 tier, 8 Sleeper Class & 2 SLR (Seating cum Luggage Rake) coaches. It carries a Pantry car coach.

As is customary with most train services in India, Coach Composition may be amended at the discretion of Indian Railways depending on demand.

== Time table ==
The 22201 Sealdah Puri Duronto Express starts exactly at 8 pm from Platform number 9 of Sealdah every Monday, Wednesday and Friday and reaches Platform number 1 of Puri at 4:10 am next morning.

Similarly the 22202 Puri Sealdah Duronto Express starts from Platform number 1 of Puri at 7:25 pm every Tuesday, Thursday and Saturday and reaches Platform 11 of Sealdah next day at 4:15 am.

During its Journey the train stops at Kharagpur and Bhubaneswar for 5 minutes each.

== Service ==
The 22201 Sealdah Puri Duronto Express covers the distance of 522 kilometres in 08 hours 00 mins (65.25 km/h) and in 08 hours 15 mins as 22202 Puri Sealdah Duronto Express (63.27 km/h).

As the average speed of the train is above 55 km/h (34 mph), as per Indian Railways rules, its fare includes a superfast surcharge.
