= Howrah–Barddhaman chord line =

Railway Route in West Bengal, India

Overview
- Status: Operational
- Owner: Indian Railways
- Locale: West Bengal
- Termini: Howrah; Bardhaman
- Stations: 27

Service
- System: Commuter rail
- Operator: Eastern Railway

History
- Opened: 1917

Technical
- Line length: 95 km (59 mi)
- Track gauge: 5 ft 6 in (1,676 mm) broad gauge
- Electrification: 1964–65
- Operating speed: 160 km/h (99 mph)

The Howrah–Barddhaman chord line is a broad-gauge rail line connecting Howrah and Bardhaman. The 95-kilometre-long (59 mi) railway line operates in Howrah, Hooghly and Purba Bardhaman districts in the state of West Bengal. It is part of the Howrah–Gaya–Delhi line, Howrah–Delhi main line, Howrah–Prayagraj–Mumbai line and the Kolkata Suburban Railway system.

== History ==
The Howrah–Bardhaman chord, a shorter link to Bardhaman from Howrah than the Howrah–Bardhaman main line, was constructed in 1917.

In 1932, the Calcutta chord line was built over the then Willingdon Bridge (now Vivekananda Setu) joining Dum Dum with Dankuni.

Dhaniakhali station on the Howrah–Bardhaman chord line was added in December 2003.

== Electrification ==
Howrah–Bardhaman chord was electrified in 1964–66.

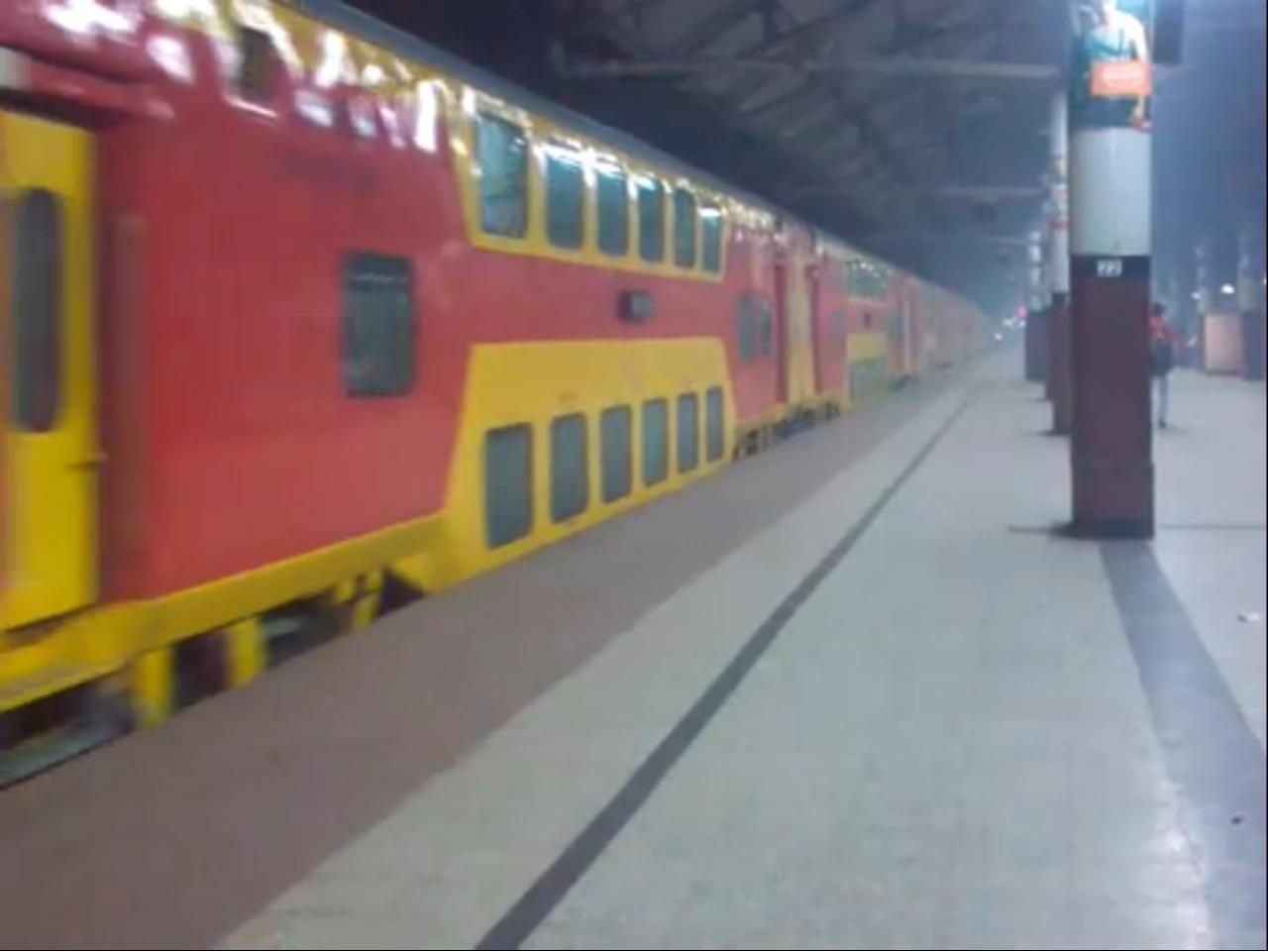
Double Decker train at Howrah Station after a trial run.

== Overview ==
India's first air-conditioned double-decker train, running between Howrah and Dhanbad was introduced in 2011. The train will run at a permissible speed of 110 km per hour on the Howrah–Bardhaman chord line.

Earlier, nine rake EMU coaches were used in local trains but twelve coach EMU trains have been introduced in the chord line in 2011, for which the platforms have been extended.

The 117 kilometres (73 mi) long Bankura–Masagram line connects to the Howrah–Bardhaman chord near Masagram. The 231 kilometres (144 mi) distance for Bankura–Howrah travelling via Kharagpur has been reduced to about 185 kilometres (115 mi).

The railway track was extended to Belur Math in 2003.

== Tracks ==
There are five tracks between Howrah and Bally. There are three tracks between Bally and Dankuni. There are four tracks between Dankuni and Chandanpur. There are three tracks between Chandanpur and Saktigarh. 2 tracks is now under construction for edfc from dankuni to asansol. Howrah Tarakeswar line goes over the Kamarkundu station.

== Loco and car sheds ==
Howrah has a diesel and an electric loco shed. The diesel loco shed houses WDM-2, WDM-3A, WDS-6 locos. The electric loco shed houses WAP-4 loco. Commissioned in 2001, it is one of the largest WAP-4 sheds in Indian Railways. It has facilities for stabling 70+ locos. There is a diesel loco shed at Bamangachi with WDM-2, WDS-4 and WDS-6. Bardhaman has a diesel loco shed with WDG-3A, WDM-6, WDM-2 and WDM-3A locos. There is a diesel loco shed at Liluah and an EMU car shed at Howrah. Liluah Carriage & Wagon Workshop maintains coaches and freight wagons.

Tikiapara Coaching Depot maintains 22 primary base trains and 6 round trip trains. Total coach holding capacity is 744 coaches. It handles prestigious trains like Rajdhani Express and Duronto Exptress. The Coaching Depot is under Howrah Division, Eastern Railway. Bardhaman Coaching & Wagon Depot can maintain four passenger trains, including one DEMU rake. It has a capacity of holding 71 coaches.

== Speed limits ==
Most of the Howrah–Bardhaman chord is classified as 'A' class line where trains can run up to 160 km per hour but in certain sections speeds may be limited to 120–130 km per hour. The Kolkata Rajdhani (between Howrah and New Delhi) travels at an average speed of 85.8 km per hour and the Sealdah Rajdhani (between Sealdah and New Delhi) travels at an average speed of 84.70 km per hour. The Howrah Ranchi Shatabdi Express and Howrah New Jalpaiguri Shatabdi Express runs at a top speed of 130 km/h in some sections of this line.
