= Dankuni Junction railway station =

Railway station in West Bengal, India

Dankuni Junction
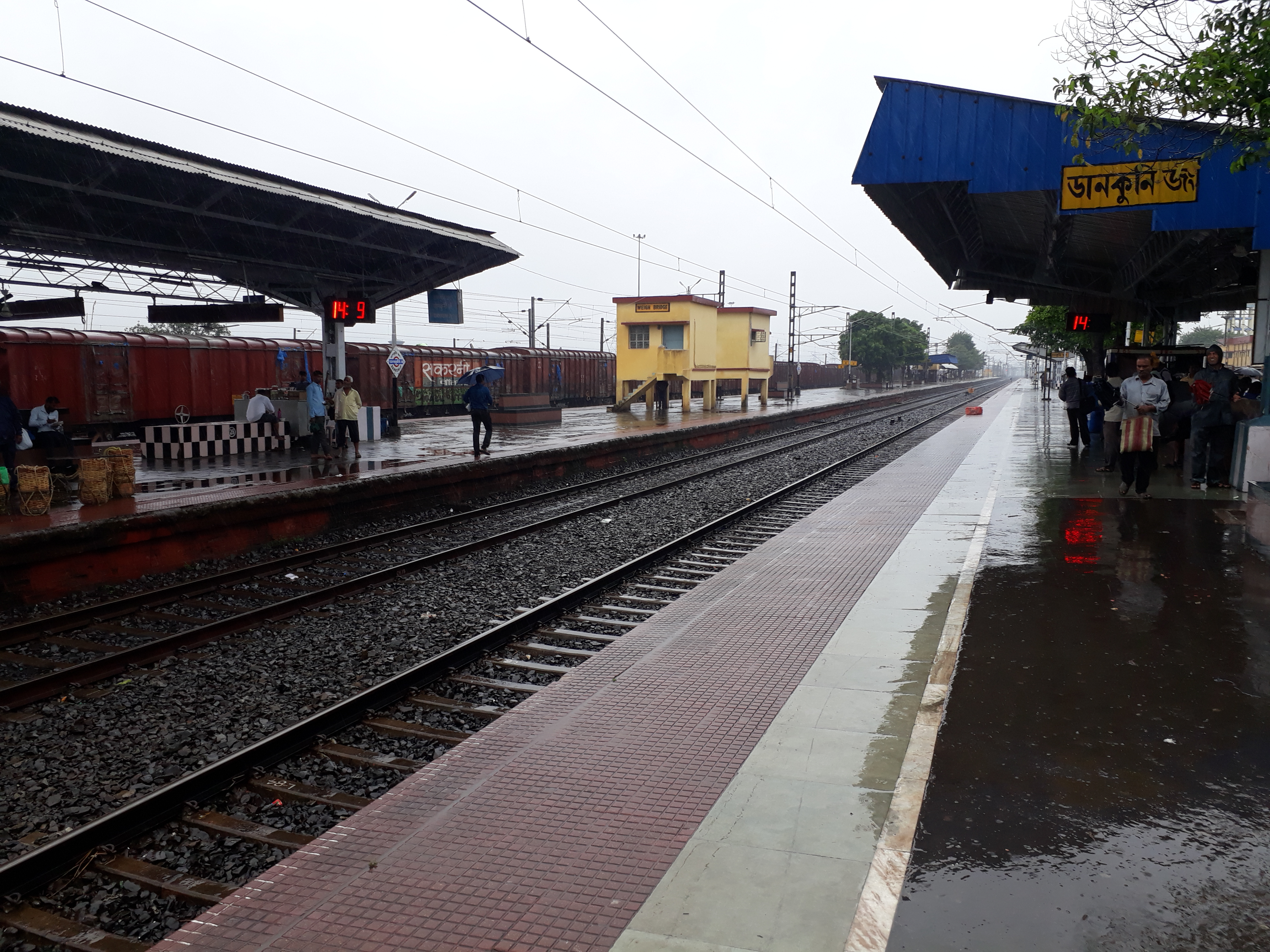

General information
- Location: Dankuni Station Road, Dankuni, Hooghly District, West Bengal; India
- Coordinates: 22°40′41″N 88°17′28″E
- Elevation: 7 metres (23 ft)
- System: Indian Railways; Kolkata Suburban Railway
- Owner: Indian Railways
- Operator: Eastern Railway
- Lines: New Delhi–Gaya–Howrah main line, New Delhi–Howrah main line, Howrah–Barddhaman Chord Line, Sealdah–Dankuni line
- Platforms: 5

Construction
- Structure type: Standard (on-ground station)
- Parking: Yes
- Cycle facilities: Yes

Other information
- Status: Functioning
- Station code: DKAE
- Zone(s): Eastern Railway
- Division(s): Howrah

History
- Opened: 1917
- Electrified: 1964–66
- Former names: East Indian Railway Company

Services
Preceding station	Kolkata Suburban Railway	Following station
Belanagar towards Howrah Junction	Eastern Line Chord line	Gobra towards Barddhaman Junction
Rajchandrapur towards Sealdah	Chord link Line	Terminus
Route map
Location
- Location within Kolkata Location within West Bengal Location within India

Dankuni Junction railway station is an important railway station serving Kolkata metropolitan area, Hooghly district in the Indian state of West Bengal. Dankuni lies on the Howrah–Bardhaman chord line. This railway station is one of the important railway station that serves Kolkata Metropolis, alongwith Howrah, Sealdah, Santragachi, Shalimar and Kolkata. Dankuni has significantly reduced the traffic congestion of Howrah railway station by emerging as a major halting point in Kolkata Metropolis for those mail and express trains plying to and fro the southern states of India to the Eastern India and Northeast India which previously use to run via Howrah. It also provides a railway interchange between the Howrah and Sealdah rail division.

== History ==
The Howrah–Bardhaman chord, a shorter link to Bardhaman from Howrah than the Howrah–Bardhaman main line, was constructed in 1917. In 1932, the Calcutta chord line was built over the Willingdon Bridge joining Dum Dum and Dankuni.

== Major Trains ==
Major trains running from Dankuni railway station are as follows:

● Sir M. Visvesvaraya Terminal –Agartala Humsafar Express (12503/12504)

● Sir M. Visvesvaraya Terminal - Alipurduar Amrit Bharat Express (16597/16598)

● Sir M. Visvesvaraya Terminal - Malda Town Amrit Bharat Express (13433/13434)

● Sir M. Visvesvaraya Terminal - Guwahati Kaziranga Superfast Express (12509/12510)

● Sir M.Visvesvaraya Terminal - New Tinsukia Express (22501/22502)

● Sir M.Visvesvaraya Terminal - Balurghat Express (16523/16524)

● Sir M.Visvesvaraya Terminal - Radhikapur Express (16223/16224)

● Sir M. Visvesvaraya Terminal - Bhagalpur Anga Express (12253/12254)

● Sir M. Visvesvaraya Terminal - Muzaffarpur Express (15227/15228)

● Sir M. Visvesvaraya Terminal - Jasidih Express (22305/22306)

● Tiruchchirappalli–New Jalpaiguri Amrit Bharat Express (20609/20610)

● Nagercoil–New Jalpaiguri Amrit Bharat Express (20603/20604)

● Kamakhya - Charlapalli Amrit Bharat Express (15673/15674)

● Silchar - Thiruvananthapuram Aronai Superfast Express (12507/12508)

● Silchar - Coimbatore Superfast Express (12515/12516)

● Dibrugarh–Kanyakumari Vivek Express (22503/22504)

● Silchar–Secunderabad Express (12513/12514)

● Kamakhya - Lokmanya Tilak Terminus Karmabhoomi Express (22511/22512)

● Puri - Patna Express (18405/18406)

== Electrification ==
Howrah–Bardhaman chord was electrified in 1964–66.

== Diesel Loco Component Factory ==
Trial production has started in the Diesel Component Factory at Dankuni. Built at a cost of Rs. 84.21 crores, it was inaugurated by Mamata Banerjee, Chief Minister of West Bengal on 28 May 2012. The components manufactured are being supplied to Banaras Locomotive Works.

== Electric Loco Component Factory ==
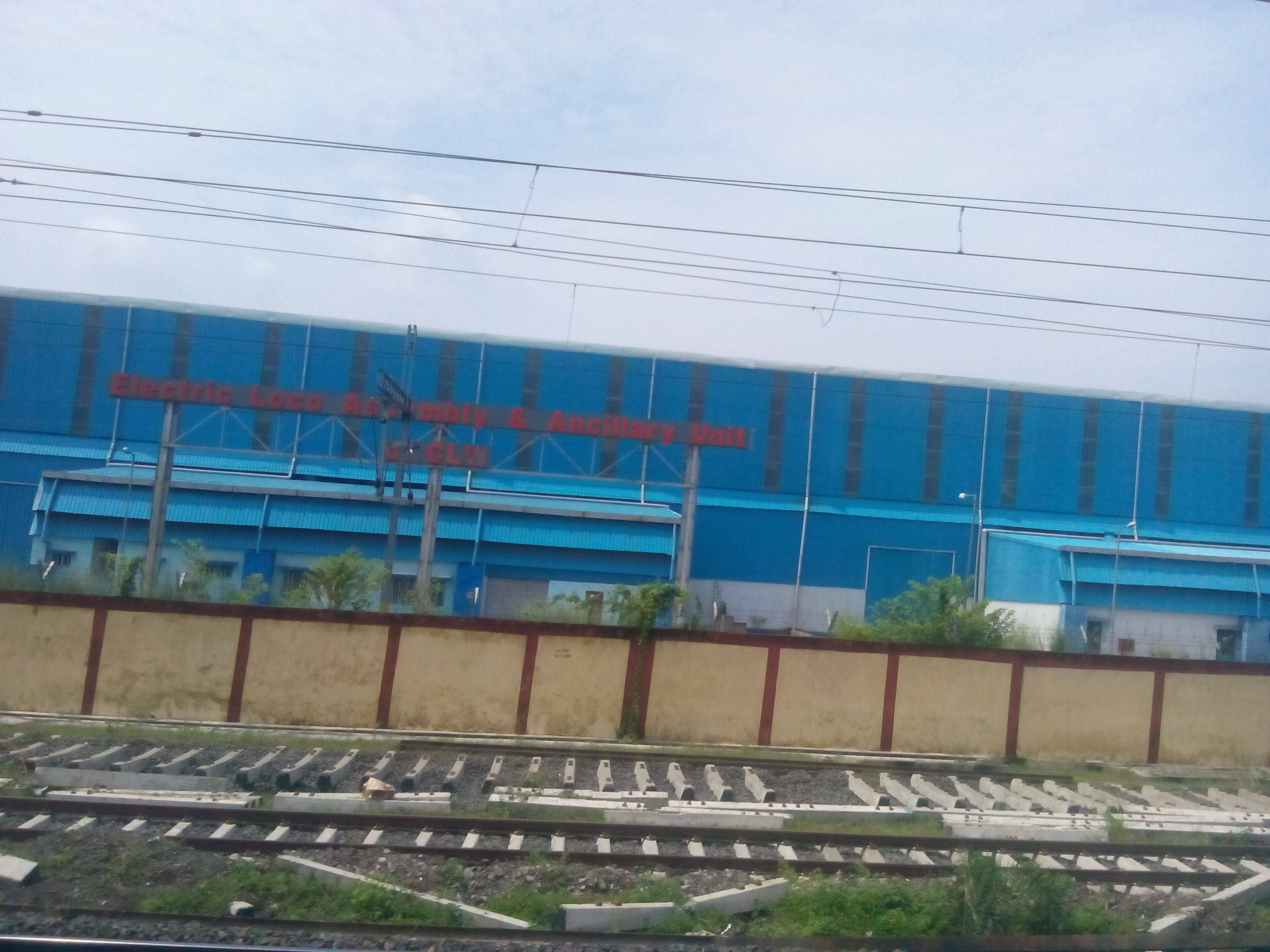
Electric Loco Component Factory in dankuni

Construction of the Rs. 270.77 crore Electric Loco Component Factory is in progress.

== Dankuni Freight Yard ==
A project is on to remodel the Dankuni Goods Yard and develop it as Dankuni Freight Yard. It will be a multi-purpose freight terminal that would consolidate the entire freight movement in one place. It will ease the load of Howrah, Sealdah, Shalimar and Chitpur yards.

== Dedicated Freight Corridor ==
The 1839 km long eastern dedicated freight corridor has been proposed from Dankuni to Ludhiana, in Punjab.
