= Sealdah railway station =

Railway station in Kolkata, West Bengal, India

Sealdah
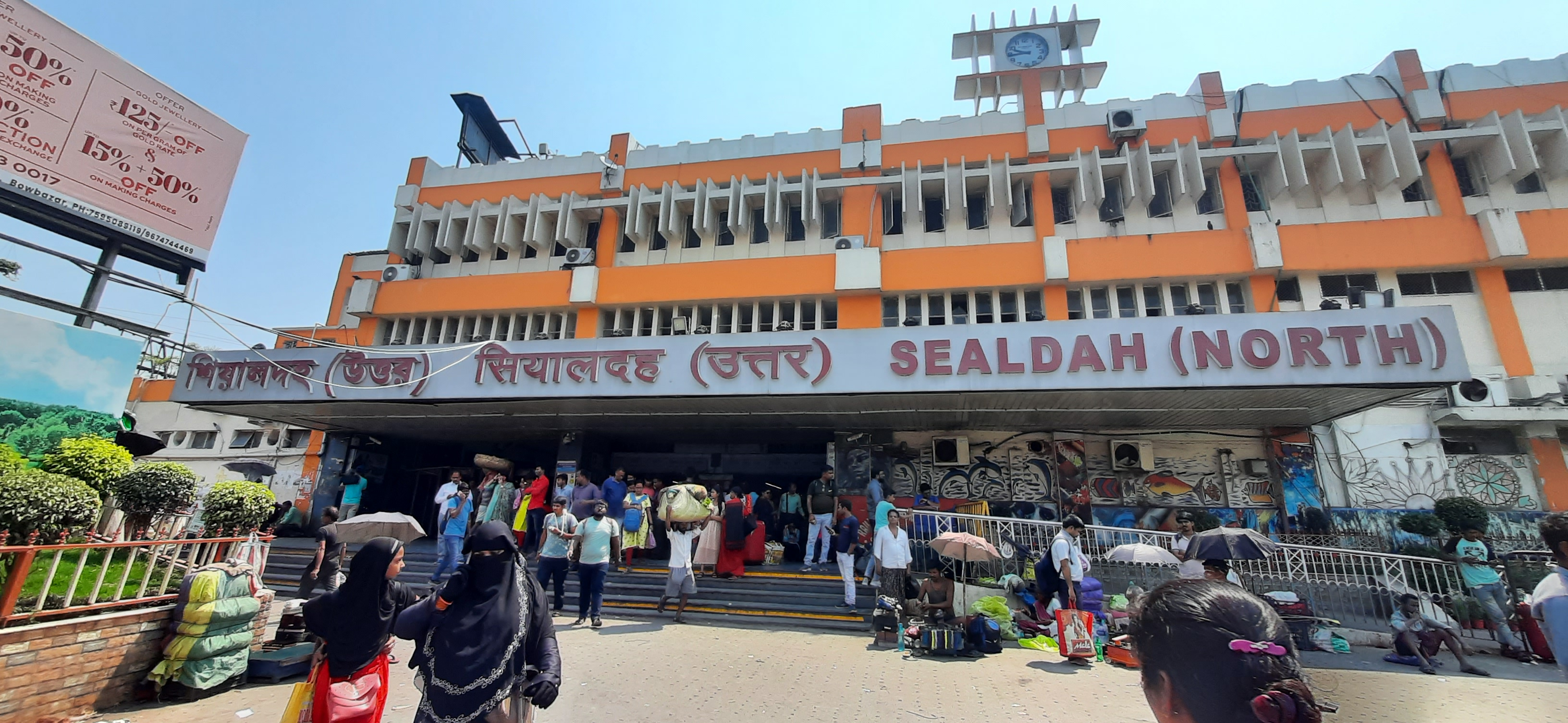
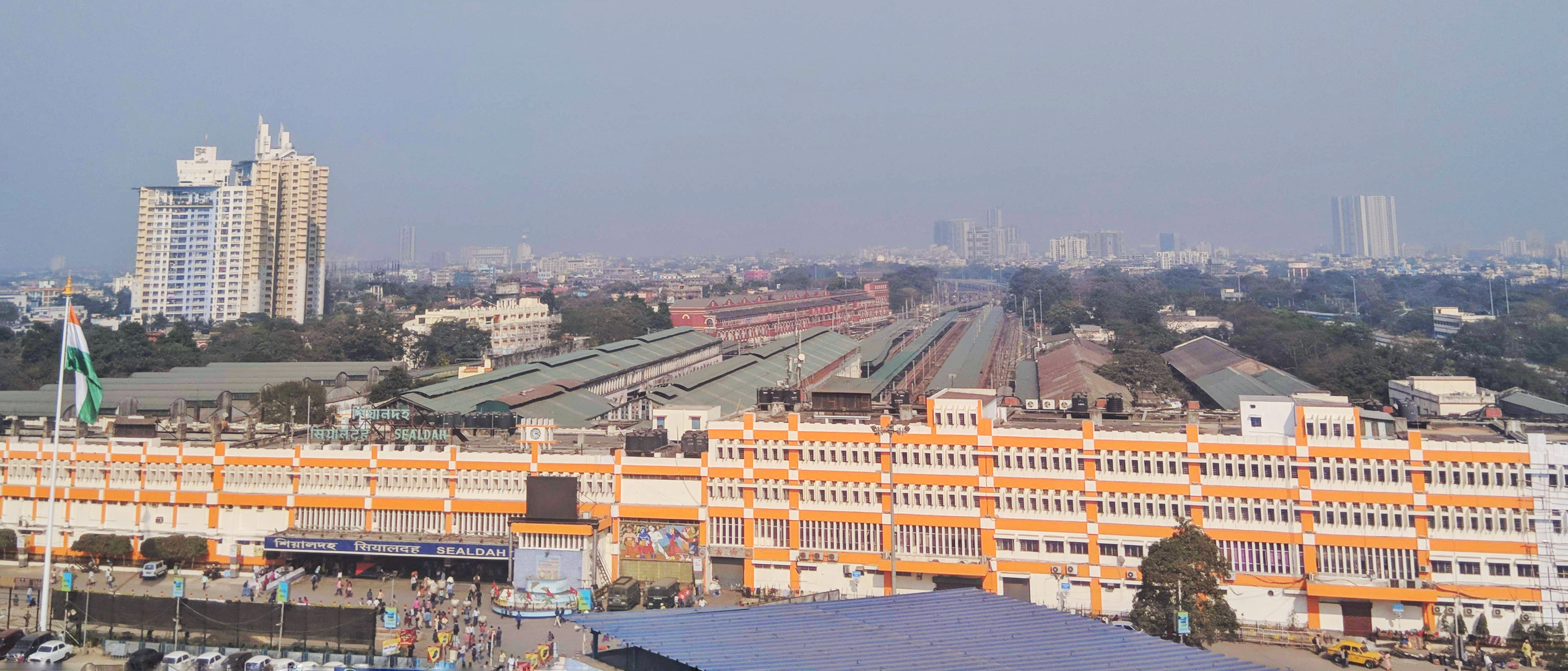
- Top: Sealdah (North) entrance Bottom: Aerial view of the station complex

General information
- Location: Sealdah, Rajabazar; Kolkata, West Bengal 700014; India
- Coordinates: 22.5680°N 88.3711°E
- Elevation: 11 metres (36 ft)
- System: Indian Railways; Kolkata Suburban Railway
- Owner: Indian Railways
- Operator: Eastern Railway
- Lines: Sealdah–Krishnanagar line, Sealdah–Bangaon line, Sealdah–Dankuni line, Sealdah–Diamond Harbour line, Sealdah–Canning line, Sealdah–Budge Budge line
- Platforms: 21
- Tracks: 28
- Connections: Sealdah

Construction
- Structure type: At grade
- Parking: Available
- Cycle facilities: Available
- Accessible: Yes

Other information
- Status: Active
- Station code: SDAH
- Zone(s): Eastern Railway
- Division(s): Sealdah

History
- Opened: 1862; 164 years ago
- Electrified: 1960; 66 years ago
- Former names: Eastern Bengal Railway; Assam Bengal Railway

Passengers
- 1.5 million+ daily

Services
Preceding station	Kolkata Suburban Railway	Following station
Terminus	Eastern Line	Bidhannagar Road towards Naihati Junction
Terminus	Chord link Line	Bidhannagar Road towards Dankuni Junction
Park Circus towards Ballygunge Junction	Sealdah South Main line	Terminus
Location

Sealdah railway station (SDAH) is an NSG–1 category Indian railway station in Sealdah railway division of Eastern Railway zone. Located at Sealdah in central Kolkata, it is one of the railway stations serving the Kolkata metropolitan area, the others being Howrah, Shalimar, Kolkata, Dankuni and Santragachi. It is the second largest and second busiest railway station in India and West Bengal in terms of platforms, tracks and overall daily passenger holding capacity, making it one of the world also.

Over 1.5 million passengers the station is used on a daily basis. It is an important suburban rail terminal of Kolkata Suburban Railway. The station has a metro station, which is on the Green Line of Kolkata Metro.

== History ==
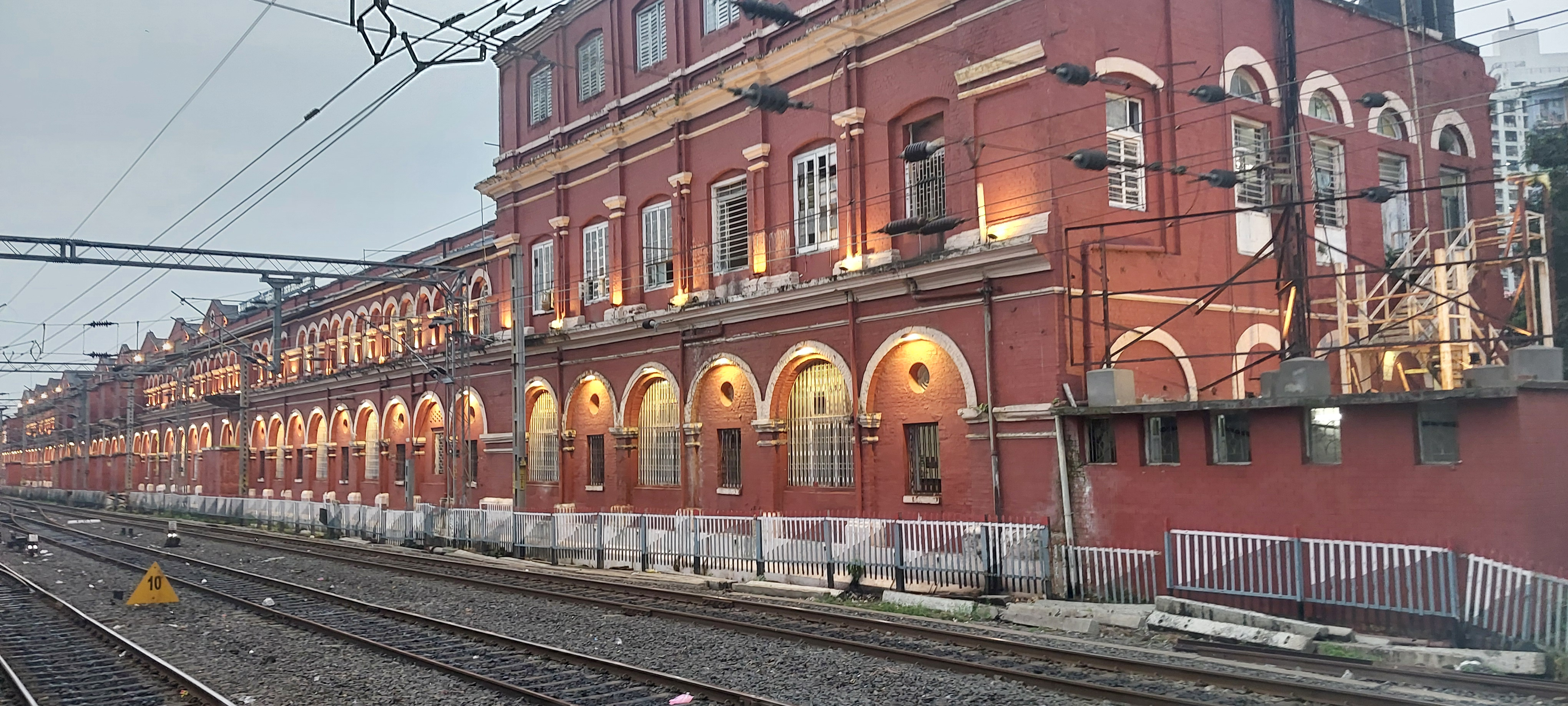
Sealdah DRM Building

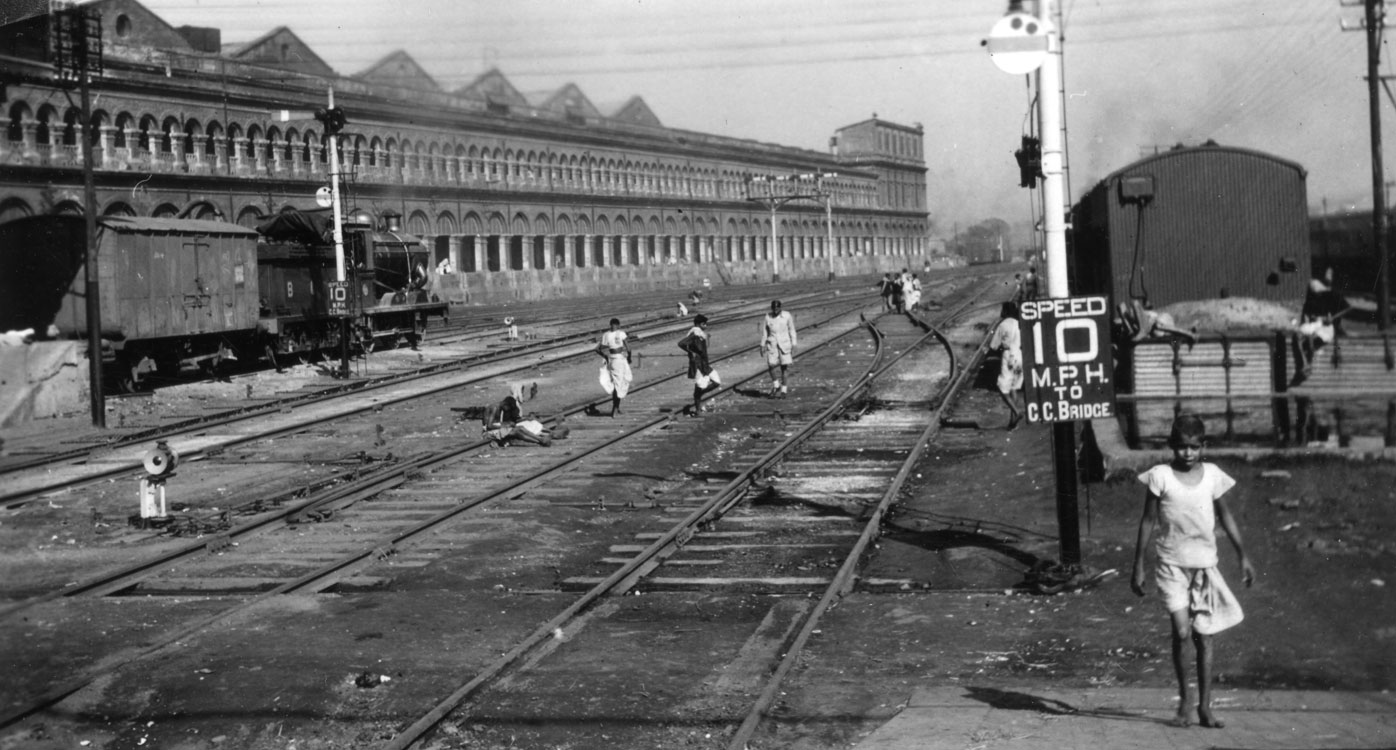
Old view of Sealdah Railway Station

The origins of Sealdah Station can be traced back to the mid-19th century when the British colonial administration initiated the construction of railways in India. The station was named after Frederick William Stevens, the then Governor-General of British India, who held the title of Lord Sealdah. Sealdah Station was officially opened to the public on 2 December 1862, as part of the Eastern Bengal Railway network from Calcutta to Kushtia. At the Calcutta end there was a tin-roofed station room. Sealdah railway station had a proper Station Building in 1869, designed by Mr Walter Glanville. The present Sealdah-Ranaghat line was a part of the Sealdah-Kushtia line and was subsequently extended to Goalundo Ghat.

Eastern Bengal Railway Company was registered in 1857 to establish railroad connection between Calcutta and Eastern part of undivided Bengal beyond Ganges(Padma). The first section was completed in January 1862 from Calcutta to Champahati. By May 1862 this extended to Port Canning. Ranaghat was connected in September 1862. Initially, the company was known as Eastern Bengal Guaranteed Railway and ran its trains on guaranteed lines. The guaranteed lines were constructed by companies formed in England. In 1862, the station was well established with 4 platforms

The tram terminus was located at Sealdah Station before the year 1981 from where the concept of horse tram carriage started. There was a tram terminus at Sealdah station. Trams departed from here towards Rajabazar, Howrah Station, Calcutta High Court, Dalhousie Square, Park Circus and Dharmatala. The first horse tram service of Kolkata was also started from Sealdah to Armenian Ghat, following the current route 14 & 16 between Lebutala & Dalhousie Square. The Sealdah–Lebutala section was closed in 1981 & Dalhousie Square–Armenian Ghat (later extended to High Court) stretchwas closed in 1995. That terminus was demolished in 1981 also with the Sealdah–Lebutala tram track stretched through Boubazar Street for construction of the Sealdah flyover. Later tram services between Rajabazar–Esplanade and Park Circus–Burrabazar and other services pass through Sealdah were completely closed in 2019 due to excuse of damaging the flyover. Currently, the rounded entrance building of Sealdah metro station exists in place of the old tram terminus.

== Operations ==
There are three station terminals at Sealdah: "Sealdah North", "Sealdah Main" and "Sealdah South":

- The "North" terminal consists of platforms 1 to 5
- The "Main" terminal consists of platforms 6 to 14. One more platform is present beside platform no 14 which is used only by goods trains and high capacity parcel vans.
- The "South" terminal consists of platforms 15 to 21.

The north and south sections have a separate set of emerging tracks. The north and south sections are connected by two links: Dumdum–Majherhat link (popularly circular rail) and Bidhannagar Road–Park Circus link (extension of circular rail). These two links were constructed to quickly travel between the two sections, avoiding Sealdah.

Sealdah North acts as the suburban train terminal for the main division. The main division of Sealdah north operates trains plying between Kolkata and Hasnabad, Bandel, Gede, Ranaghat, Shantipur, Krishnanagar, Berhampore, Lalgola, Dankuni, Katwa, Bardhaman, Kanchrapara, Barrackpore, Kalyani, Kalyani Simanta and others. A narrow-gauge line earlier used to connect Shantipur and Krishnanagar but now it has been replaced with broad gauge. This narrow-gauge line further continued to Nabadwip Ghat and was formerly served by DMU trains (all other lines run EMU trains). Sealdah–Dankuni (via Vivekananda Setu) line connects Eastern Railway's Howrah–Bardhaman chord at Bally Halt (on a viaduct atop Bally station) and Dankuni. Naihati–Bandel (via Sampreeti Bridge) line connects Eastern Railway's Howrah–Bardhaman main line at Bandel Jn.

In 2016, the poorly-patronised branch line between Dum Dum Cantonment and Biman Bandar (serving Dum Dum Airport) was closed and replaced by Yellow Line (under construction) of the Kolkata Metro.

Sealdah Main is the mail/express terminal for long-distance trains to northern, north-western, north-eastern and eastern India, through Dankuni line and Bandel line. Krishnanagar line is also serving long distance intrastate trains.The Santragachi chord line link, between Rajchandrapur and Dankuni, serves as a transit for trains from the South Eastern Railways to access Bardhaman, Bolpur Shantiniketan, Durgapur and Sealdah. Currently, the only train from Sealdah serving the South Eastern Railway is the Puri Duronto Express

The South section, consisting of Sealdah South terminal, acts as the terminal for local trains plying between Kolkata and Budge Budge, Canning, Diamond Harbour and Namkhana. This section is used by only suburban trains.

There is also an EMU carshed at Sealdah (Narkeldanga). Other EMU carsheds are at Barasat and Sonarpur. A diesel shunter loco shed is also situated at adjacent Beliaghata. An electric loco shed is situated at Sealdah also. A rail coach factory is set to come up at Halishahar-Kanchrapara (Bijpur) region in North 24 Parganas.

Before partition in 1947 of India, trains used to run up to present day Bangladesh along Gede line and Bangaon line. Now Gede line is used by Maitree Express up to Dhaka and Bangaon line is used by Bandhan Express up to Khulna. Both trains are indefinitely suspended due to political disturbance at Bangladesh.

== Lines ==
- Sealdah–Dum Dum–Baranagar–Dakshineswar–Rajchandrapur–Baltikuri–Andul–Kharagpur
- Sealdah–Dum Dum–Baranagar–Dakshineswar–Dankuni–Barddhaman
- Sealdah–Dum Dum–Naihati–Kalyani–Kalyani Simanta
- Sealdah–Dum Dum–Naihati–Kalyani–Ranaghat–Krishnanagar–Berhampore–Lalgola
- Sealdah–Dum Dum–Naihati–Kalyani–Ranaghat–Kalinarayanpur–Krishnanagar
- Sealdah–Dum Dum–Naihati–Kalyani–Ranaghat–Kalinarayanpur–Shantipur
- Krishnanagar–Dignagar–Shantipur
- Sealdah–Dum Dum–Naihati–Kalyani–Ranaghat–Gede
- Sealdah–Dum Dum–Naihati–Bandel–Barddhaman
- Sealdah–Dum Dum–Naihati–Bandel–Ambika Kalna–Nabadwip Dham–Katwa
- Sealdah–Dum Dum–Barasat–Bongaon
- Sealdah–Dum Dum–Barasat–Basirhat–Hasnabad
- Ranaghat–Majhergram–Bongaon
- Sealdah–Ballygunge–Majerhat–BBD Bag–Kolkata
- Sealdah–Ballygunge–Majerhat–Budge Budge
- Sealdah–Ballygunge–Jadavpur–New Garia–Sonarpur–Champahati–Ghutiari Sharif–Canning
- Sealdah–Ballygunge–Jadavpur–New Garia–Sonarpur–Baruipur–Magrahat–Diamond Harbour
- Sealdah–Ballygunge–Jadavpur–New Garia–Sonarpur–Baruipur–Jaynagar Majilpur–Lakshmikantapur–Kakdwip–Namkhana

== Major Trains ==
Major long-distance train services that originate from Sealdah, are:

- Sealdah–Bikaner Duronto Express (12259/12260)
- Sealdah–Puri Duronto Express (22201/22202)
- Sealdah–New Delhi Rajdhani Express (12313/12314)
- Sealdah–Jammu Tawi Humsafar Express (22317/22318)
- Sealdah–Jalpaiguri Road Humsafar Express (13115/13116)
- Sealdah–Anand Vihar Terminal West Bengal Sampark Kranti Express (12329/12330)
- Sealdah–New Jalpaiguri Superfast Darjeeling Mail (12343/12344)
- Sealdah–New Alipurduar Padatik Superfast Express (12377/12378)
- Sealdah–Amritsar Jallianwalla Bagh Express (12379/12380)
- Sealdah–Ajmer Express (12987/12988)
- Sealdah–Alipurduar Kanchan Kanya Express (13149/13150)
- Sealdah–Silchar Kanchanjungha Express (13175/13176)
- Sealdah–Sabroom Kanchanjungha Express (13173/13174)
- Sealdah–Jangipur Road Express (13177/13178)
- Sealdah–Rampurhat Maa Tara Express (13187/13188)
- Sealdah-Banaras Amrit Bharat Express (22587/22588)
- Sealdah–Ballia Express (13105/13106)
- Sealdah–New Alipurduar Teesta Torsha Express (13141/13142)
- Sealdah–Jaynagar Ganga Sagar Express (13185/13186)
- Sealdah–Lalgola Bhagirathi Express (13103/13104)
- Sealdah–Bamanhat Uttar Banga Express (13147/13148)
- Sealdah–Saharsa Hate Bazare Express (via Mansi) (13163/13164)
- Sealdah–Malda Town Gour Express (13153/13154)
- Sealdah–Asansol Intercity Express (12383/12384)
- Sealdah–Balurghat Express (13189/13190)
- Sealdah–Saharsa Hate Bazare Express (via Purnea) (13170/13171)

== Station facilities ==
=== Executive lounge ===
IRCTC opened the first executive lounge at this station, the first in any of the main stations in the state of West Bengal. In 2019, on the occasion of Bengali New Year, the lounge was opened. It covers around 2,500 sq ft (230 m^{2}) area, and has free Wi-Fi, showers, foods, newspapers, TV, cloak room facilities available. Though on the first floor, it is next to the elevator to make it accessible to wheelchair users.

- The station has a first class air conditioning waiting room and a resting area with bedding facilities.
- Google provides RailWire free high-speed Wi-Fi.
- The station also has many IRCTC food court and restaurants including Haldiram, Jan-Ahaar, Mio Amore and Wow Momos.
- Amazon India has launched an Amazon kiosk in the non-ticketing zone, where passengers can pick up their parcels.
- The station has a large reservation ticketing zone where passengers can book their tickets in advance.

== Sealdah metro station ==
Sealdah metro station is an operational station on Green Line of the Kolkata Metro, located in Sealdah, Kolkata. The underground station adjoins with the Sealdah railway station of the Indian Railways on its eastern side. This station is situated at the place of former tram terminus.

== Electric Loco Shed, Sealdah ==
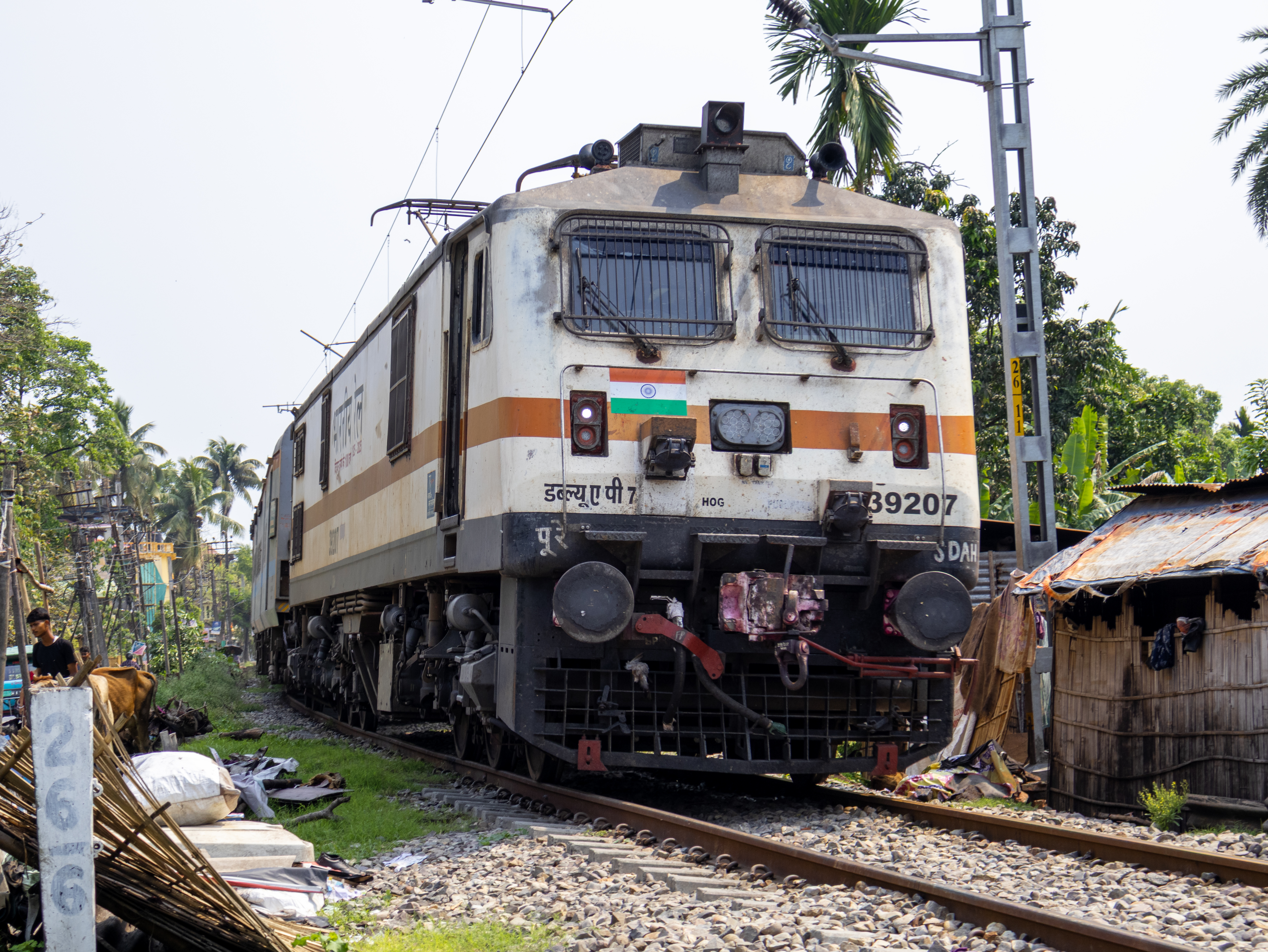
Sealdah based WAP-7 hauling Uttar Banga Express

The Sealdah Loco Shed (SDAD) currently houses electric locomotive WAP-7 class and diesel shunter locomotive type WDS-6 (under 'Beliaghata diesel loco shed (BGA)' name)

Sr. No.	Locomotive Class	Horsepower	Quantity
1.	WAP-7	6350	46
Total Locomotives Active as of May 2026			46

== Gallery ==
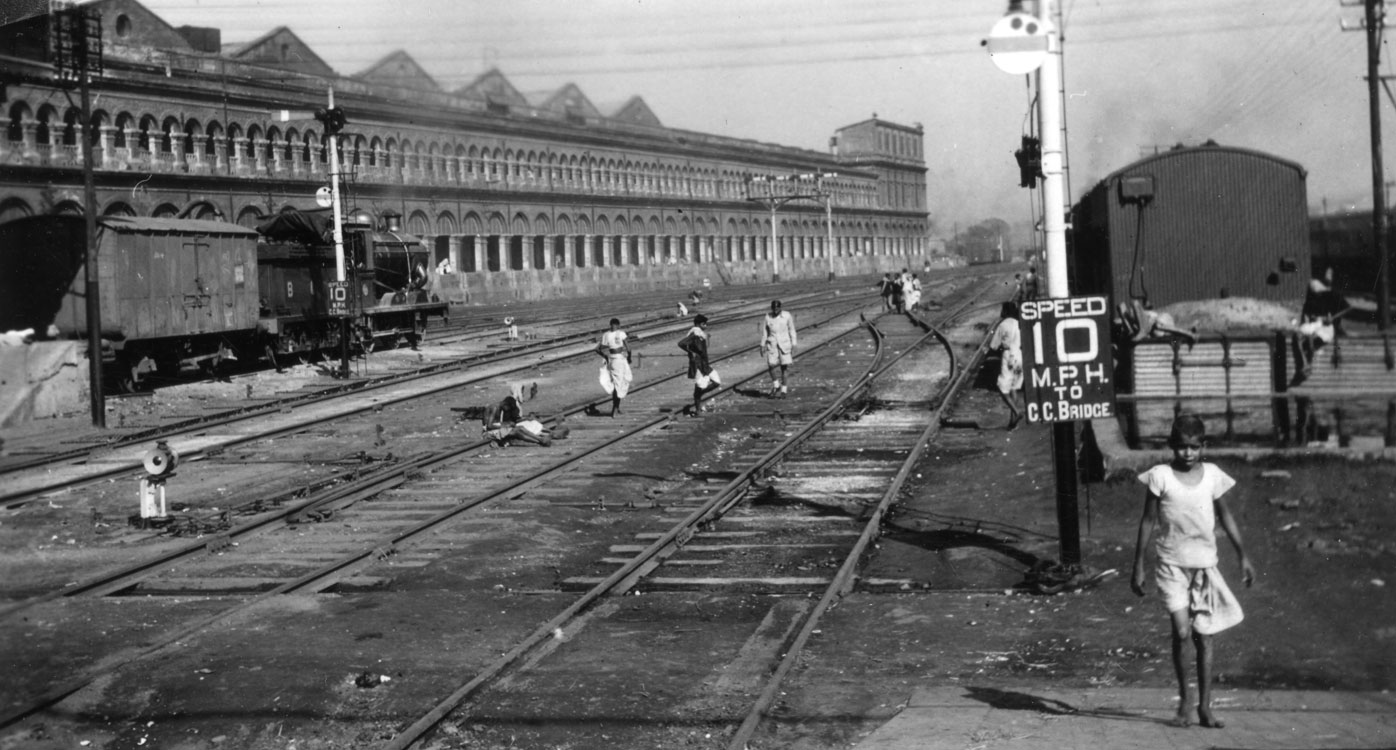
Old view of Divisional Railway Manager's Office Building

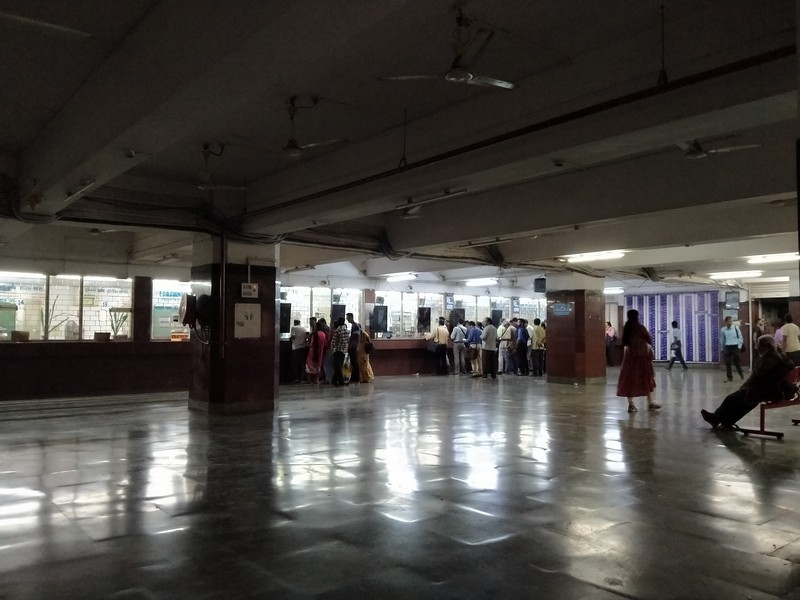
Reservation counter

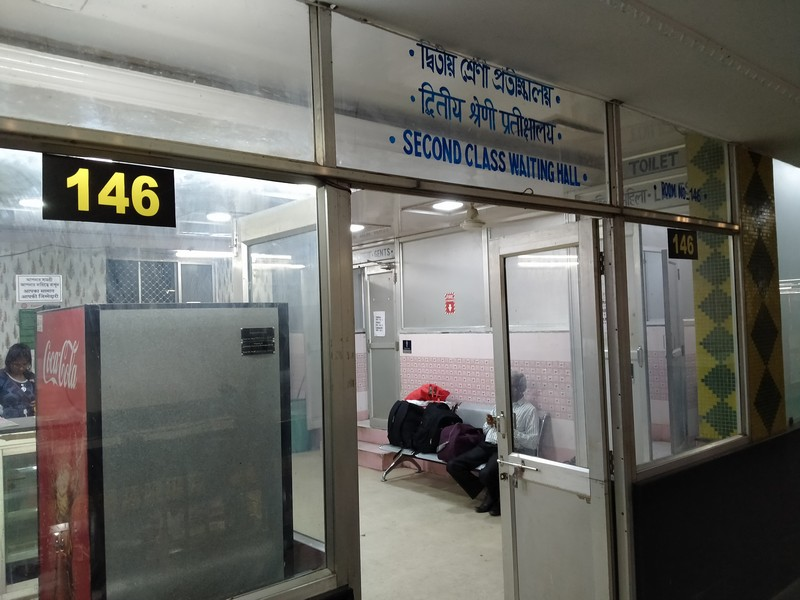
General waiting room

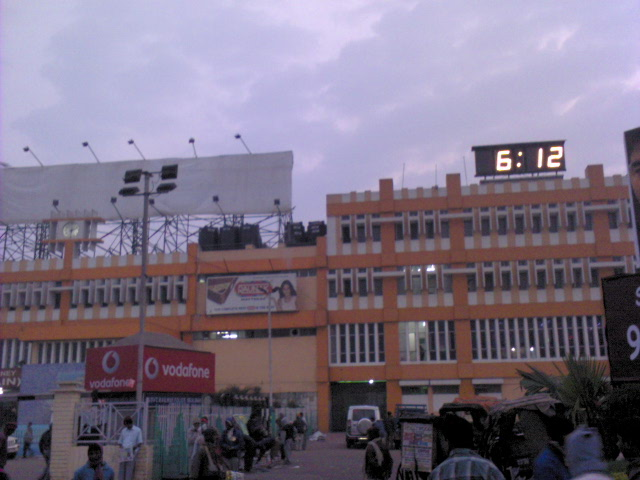
Exterior of Sealdah station north building

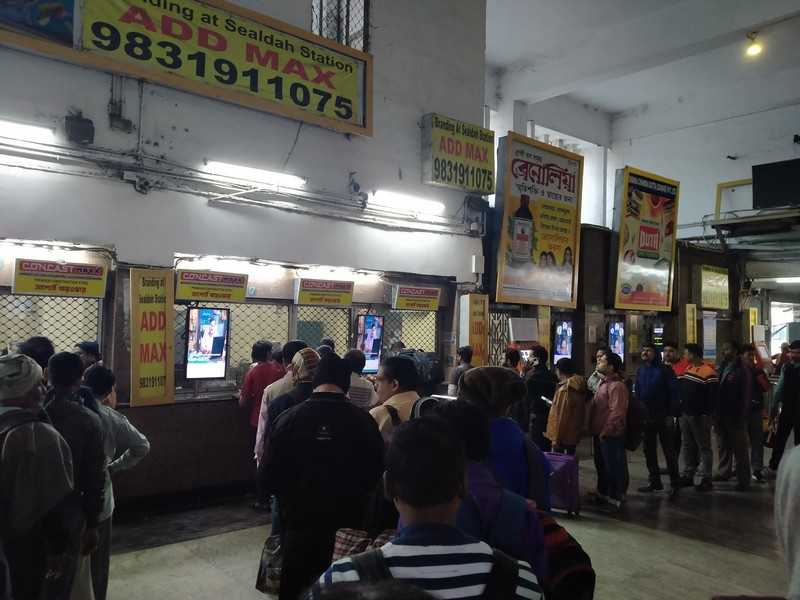
General ticket counter at north building

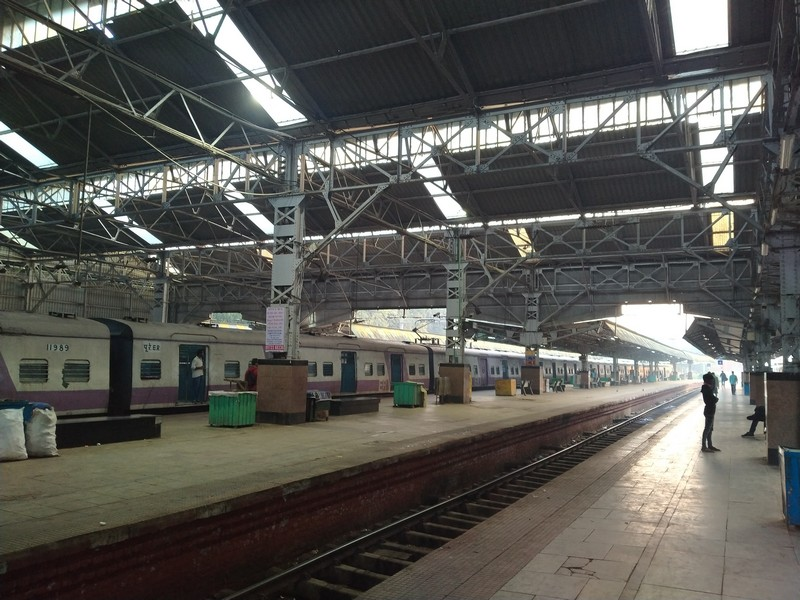
The large shaded 'suburban train only' platform area since British era with some both side platforms

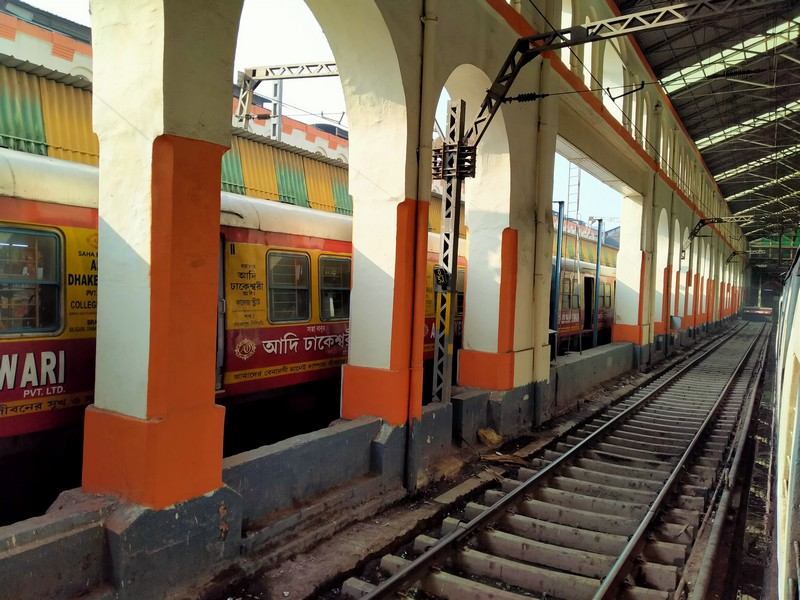
The large decorative shaded main building platform area since British era

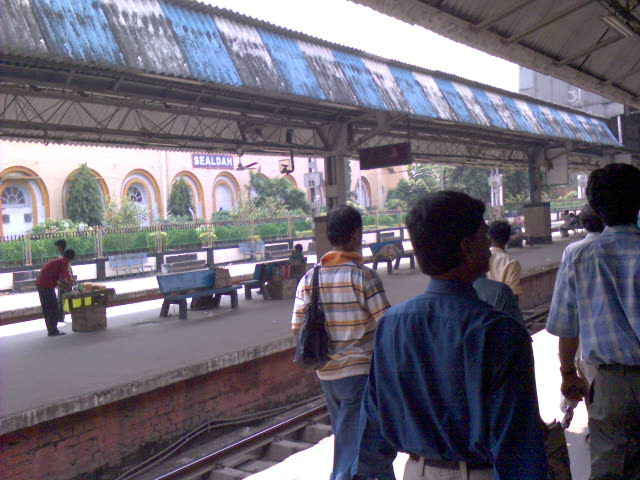
Platform of Sealdah station

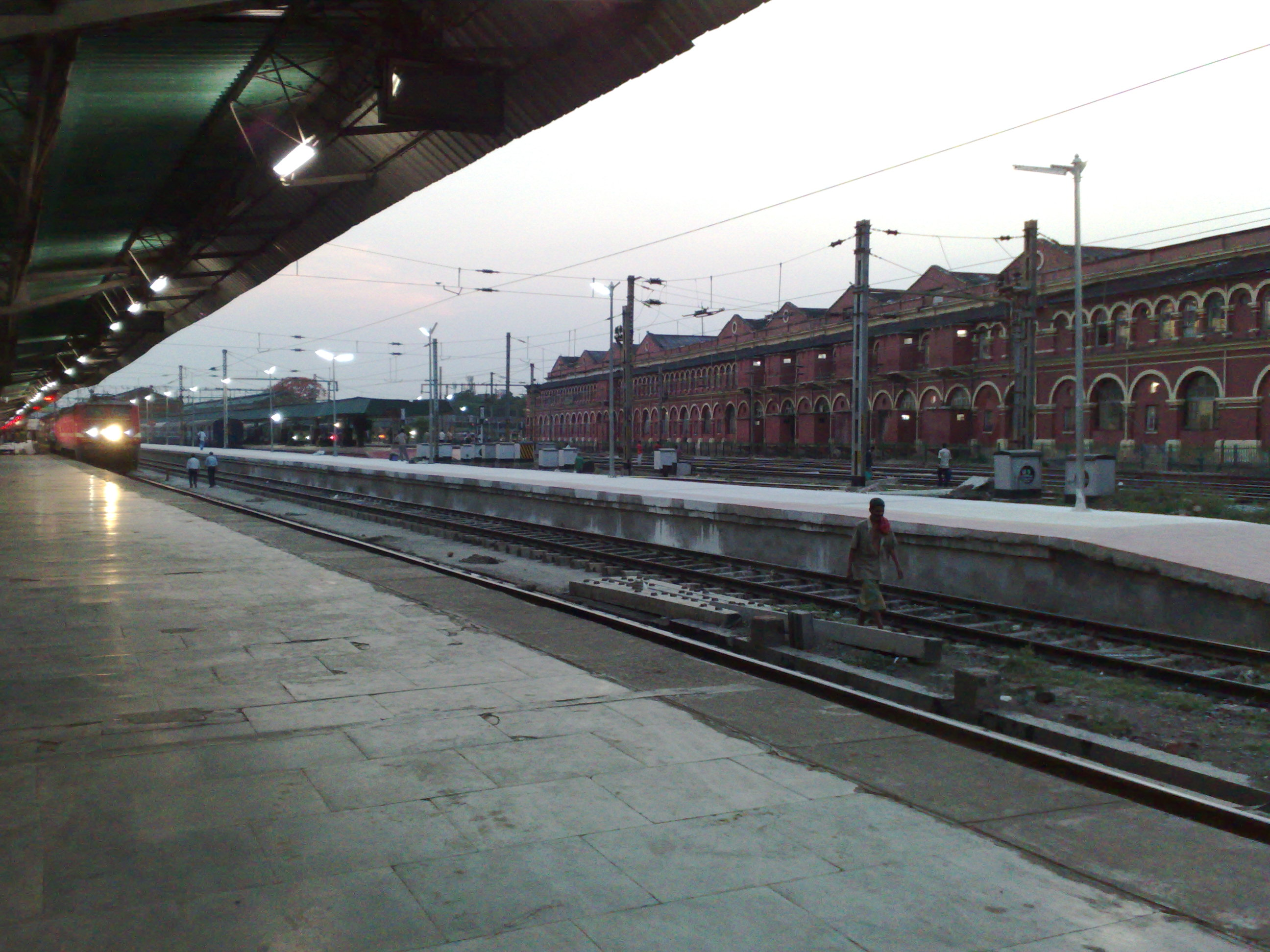
12259 Sealdah–New Delhi Duronto Express – departure from platform 12 (formerly 9B)

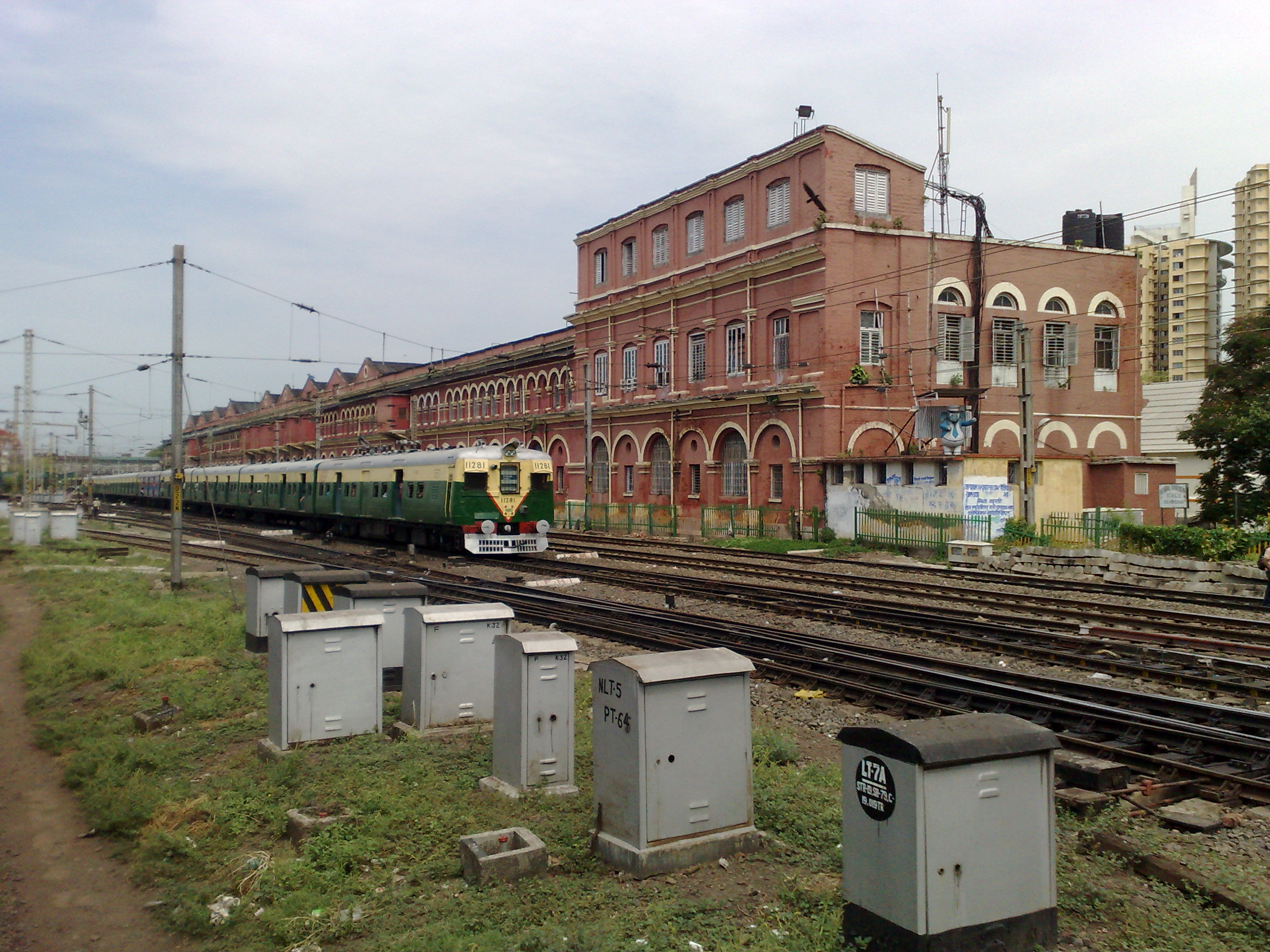
On approach to Sealdah

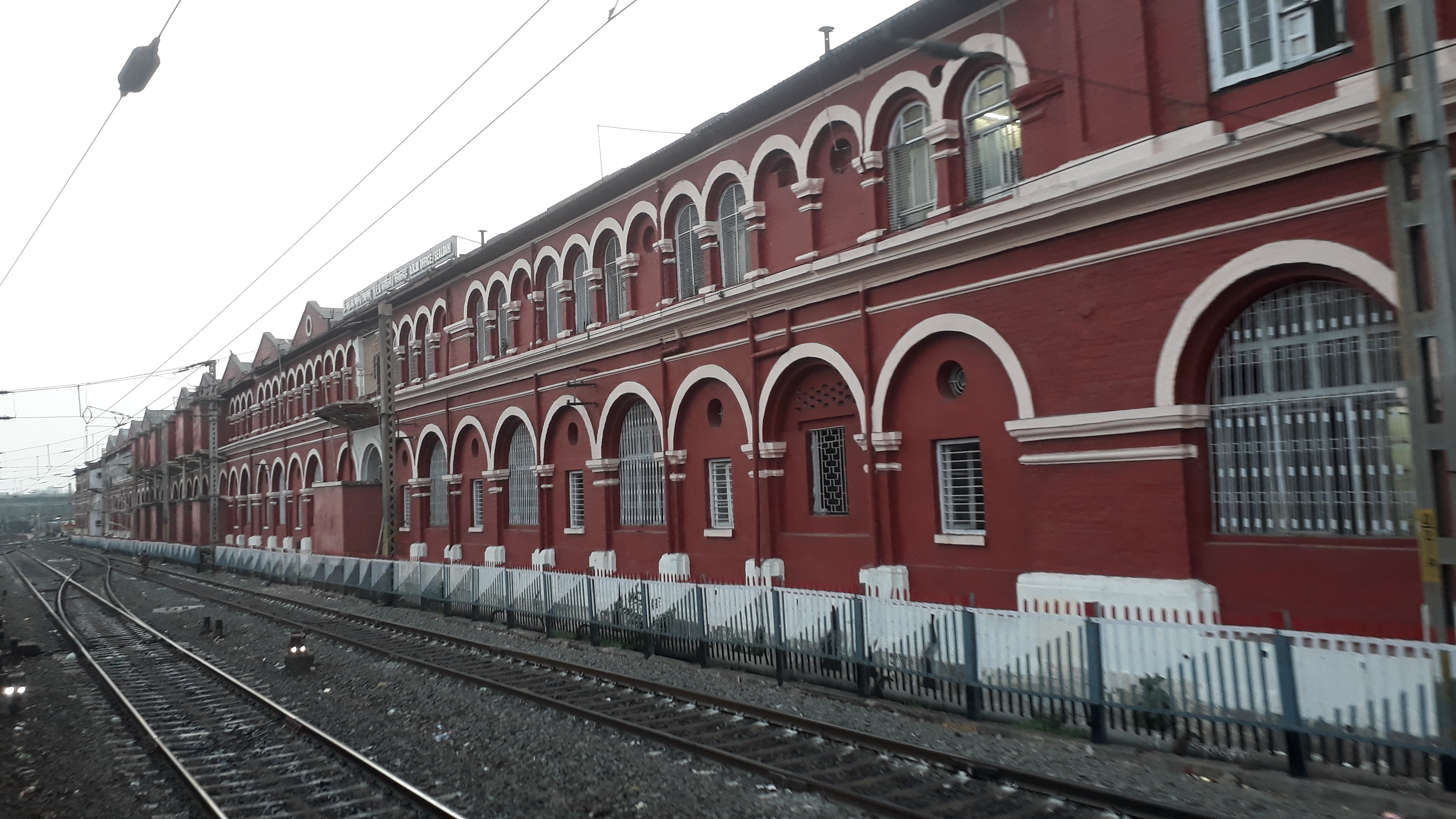
Century old Divisional Railway Manager (DRM) office

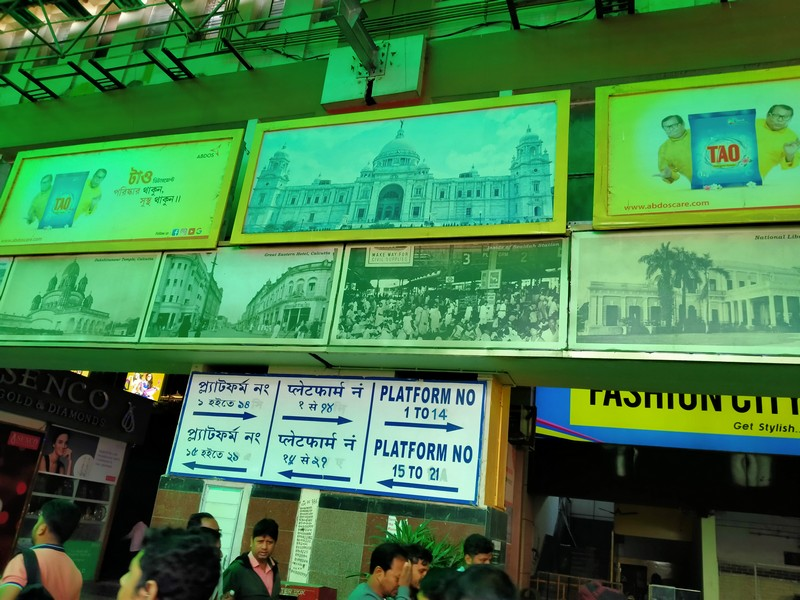
Connecting shaded passage between north and south building made in early 2000's

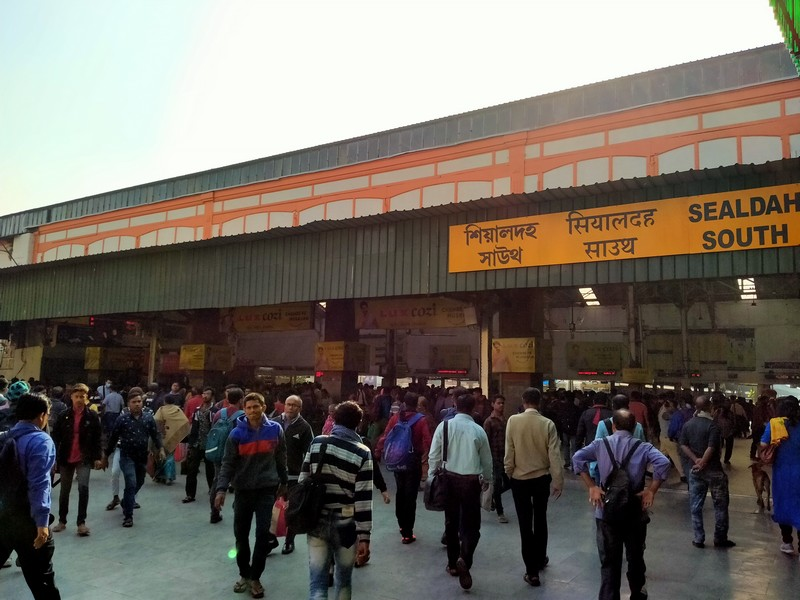
South building is still keeping the British Era design unlike North building

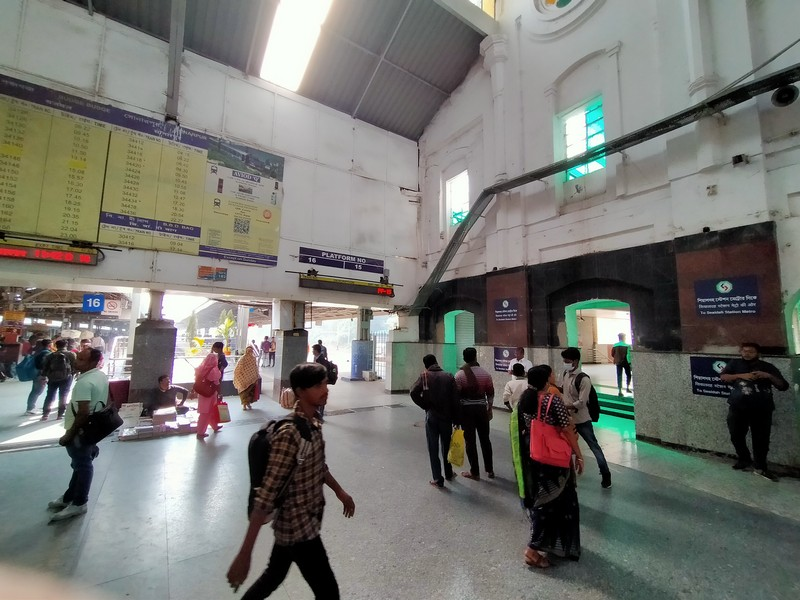
Very easy, short and smooth connection between train and metro station

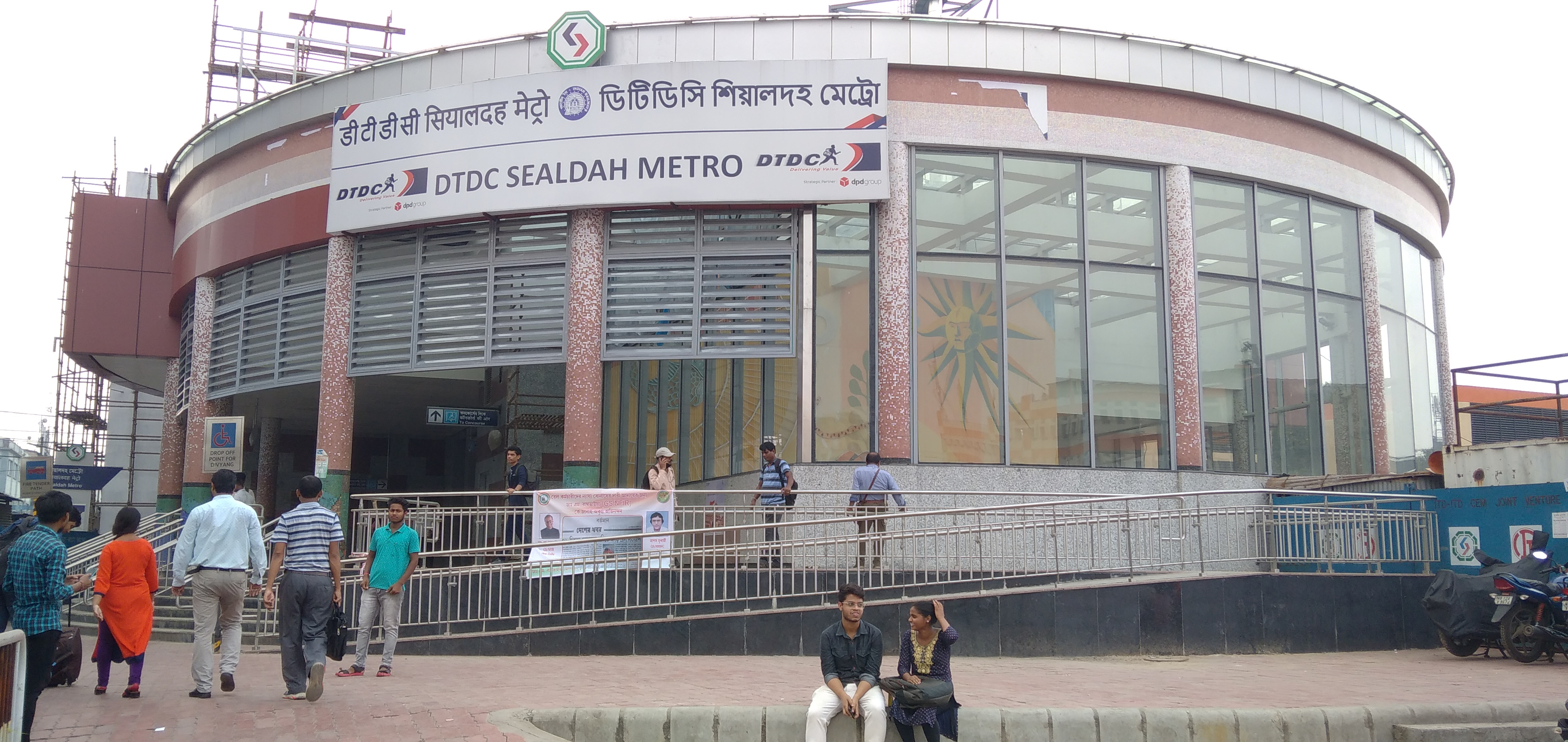
Unique round shaped Sealdah metro station, situated at the place of former tram terminus

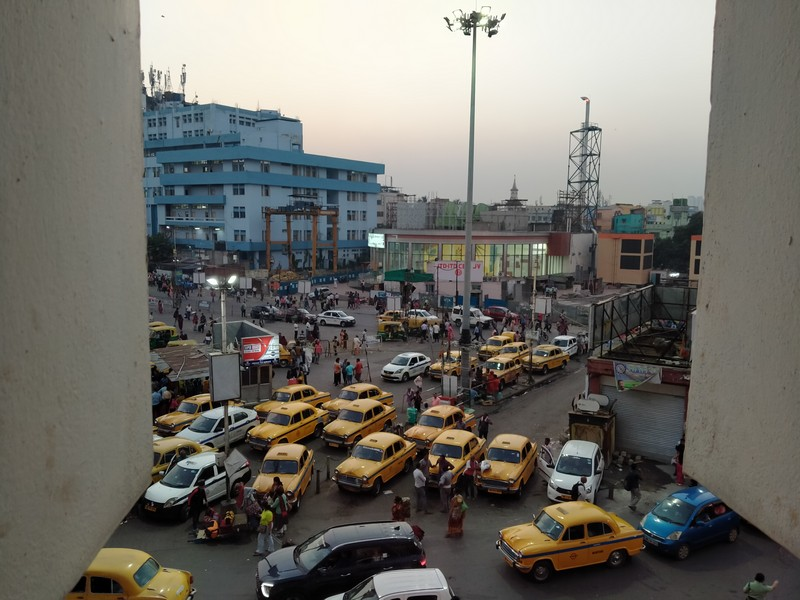
Taxi stand, metro station and court is being seen from reservation counter

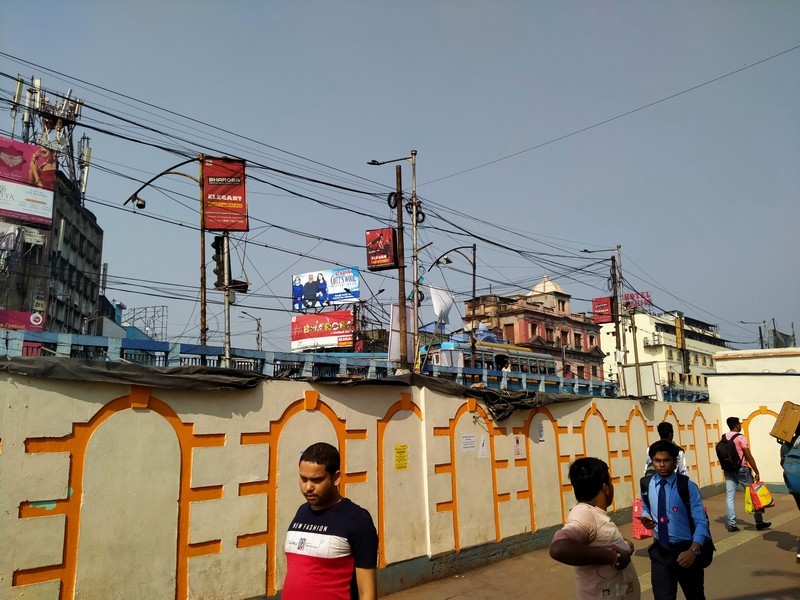
This flyover was opened in 1982 and replaced at-graded tram tracks on it, and finally closed tram service in 2019

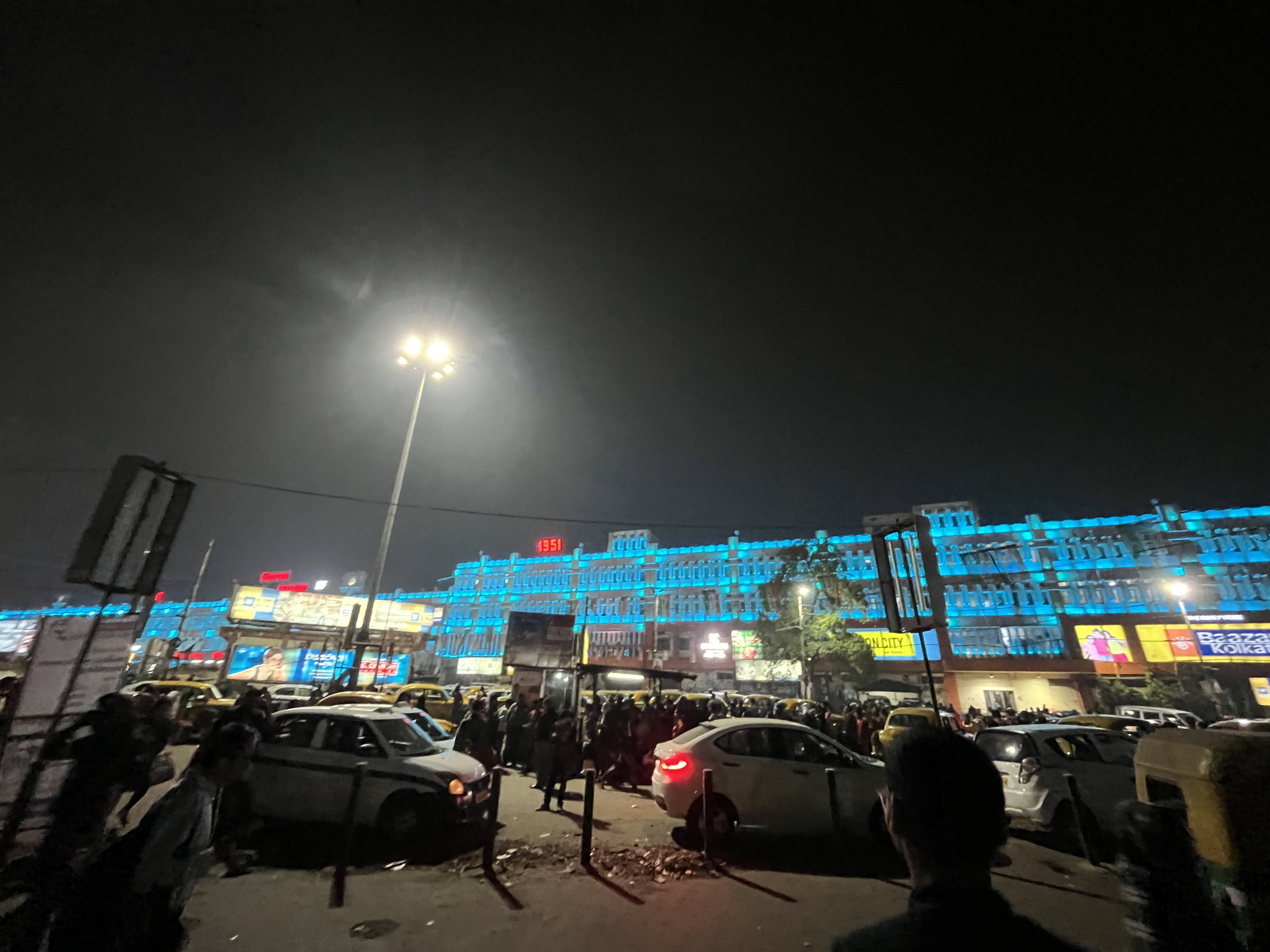
Night view of the Station

== See also ==
- Kolkata Metro
- Kolkata
- Kolkata Suburban Railway
- List of Kolkata Suburban Railway stations
- Trams in Kolkata
