= Mongalkote (community development block) =

- Community development block
- Location in West Bengal
- Coordinates: 23°30′51″N 87°53′28″E
- Country: India
- State: West Bengal
- District: Purba Bardhaman
- Parliamentary constituency: Bolpur
- Assembly constituency: Mangalkot

Area
  - Total: 141.10 sq mi (365.44 km^{2})
- Elevation: 62 ft (19 m)

Population (2011)
  - Total: 263,240
  - Density: 1,865.7/sq mi (720.34/km^{2})
- Time zone: UTC+5.30 (IST)
- PIN: 713147 (Mongalkote/ Nutanhat)
- Telephone/STD code: 03453
- Vehicle registration: WB-37,WB-38,WB-41,WB-42,WB-44
- Literacy Rate: 67.97 per cent
- Website: http://purbabardhaman.gov.in/

Mongalkote (also spelled variously as Mangalkot, Mangolkot, Mongolkot etc.) is a community development block that forms an administrative division in Katwa subdivision of Purba Bardhaman district in the Indian state of West Bengal.

== History ==
Damage to embankments of the Ajay and consequent flooding was a regular problem in the Ausgram and Mangalkot area. The devastating flood of 1943 caused immense suffering and led to a mass movement for restoration/ repair of the embankments. A massive meeting was organised at Guskara in 1944, with Uday Chand Mahtab, Maharaja of Bardhaman. However, the government did not take any action. Ultimately, the Communist Party, which had been at the forefront of agitations for some years, provided a huge work force for the purpose and completed the repair work. It laid the foundation for the party's popularity in the area.

== Geography ==
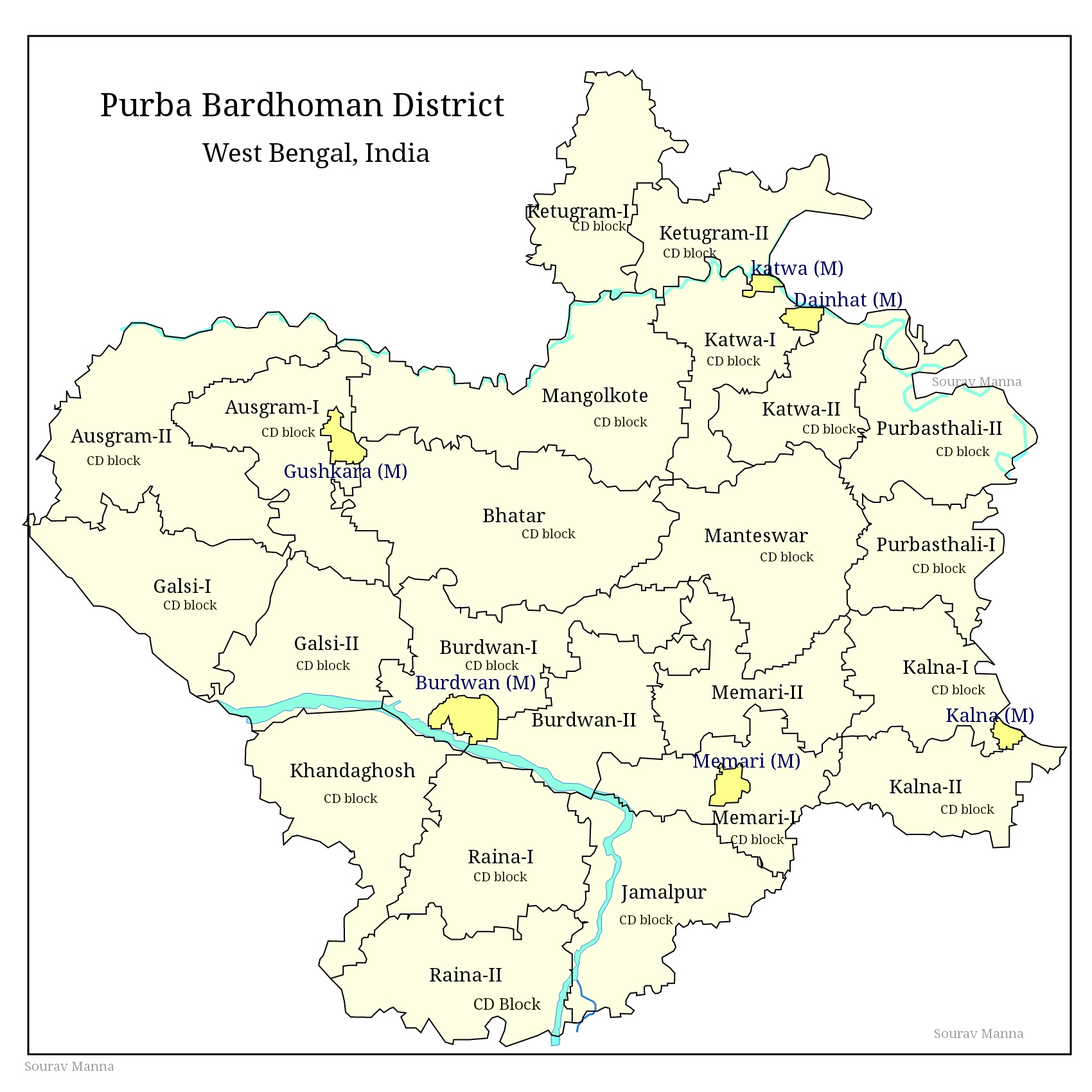
CD blocks of Purba Bardhaman district

=== Location ===
Mongalkote is located at 23°30′51″N 87°53′28″E.

Mangolkote CD Block is part of the Kanksa Ketugram plain, which lies along the Ajay. The river forms a boundary with Birbhum district on the north for a long stretch and then forms the boundary between Managolkote and Ketugram I & II CD Blocks. The uneven laterite territory found in the western part of Bardhaman district extends up to Ausgram and then the alluvial flood plains commence. The entire Durgapur-Kanksa -Faridpur-Ausgram area was densely forested even in more recent times. The influx of refugees from East Pakistan and their rehabilitation in the area, and irrigation facilities extended by Damodar Valley Corporation led to destruction of much of the forests in the area, but some still remain.

Mangolkote CD Block is bounded by Nanoor CD Block, in Birbhum district, and Ketugram I and Ketugram II CD Blocks on the north, Katwa I CD Block on the east, Bhatar CD Block on the south and Ausgram I CD Block in the west.

Mongalkote CD Block has an area of 365.44 km^{2}. It has 1 panchayat samity, 15 gram panchayats, 198 gram sansads (village councils), 132 mouzas and 130 inhabited villages. Mongolkote police station serves this block. The headquarters of this CD block is at Nutanhat.

Kunur River, one of main tributaries of the Ajay, 112 km in length, has its origin near Bansgara in the Faridpur police station area. With water from several small streams swelling it during the monsoons, it often floods large areas of Ausgram and Mangalkot police stations. It joins the Ajay near Ujani village.

Gram panchayats of Mongalkote block/panchayat samiti are Bhaluagram, Chanak, Gotistha, Jhiloo I, Jhiloo II, Kaichar I, Kaichar II, Kshirogram, Lakhuria, Majhigram, Mongalkote, Negun, Paligram, Simulia I and Simulia II.

== Demographics ==
=== Population ===
As per the 2011 Census of India Mangolkote CD Block had a total population of 263,240, all of which were rural. There were 134,693 (51%) males and 128,547 (49%) females. Population below 6 years was 31,133. Scheduled Castes numbered 81,950 (31.13%) and Scheduled Tribes numbered 7,462 (2.83%).

As per 2001 census, Mongalkote block had a total population of 233,944, out of which 120,634 were males and 113,310 were females. Mongalkote block registered a population growth of 13.85 per cent during the 1991-2001 decade. Decadal growth for Bardhaman district was 14.36 per cent. Decadal growth in West Bengal was 17.84 per cent. Scheduled castes at 73,568 formed around one-third the population. Scheduled tribes numbered 7,296.

Large villages (with 4,000+ population) in Mangolkote CD Block are (2011 census figures in brackets): Nutanhat (5,349), Mongalkote (11,537), Jhilu (5,311), Simulia (6,498), Palisgram (6,123), Majigram (4,622), Kalsuna (5,630), Bankapasi (6,250), Purbba Gopalpur (7,315), Jageswardihi (4,404), Kaichar (7,347), Nigan (6,825) and Gobardhanpur (4,227).

Other villages in Mangalkote CD Block included (2011census figures in brackets): Chanak (1,953), Gatistha (3,475), Lakhuria (3,214), Kshirgram (2,474), Bhalugram (3,494) and Paligram (3,758).

=== Literacy ===
As per the 2011 census the total number of literates in Mangolkote CD Block was 157,769 (67.97% of the population over 6 years) out of which males numbered 87,674 (73.67% of the male population over 6 years) and females numbered 70,095 (61.98% of the female population over 6 years). The gender disparity (the difference between female and male literacy rates) was 11.69%.

As per 2001 census, Mongalkote block had a total literacy of 59.37 per cent for the 6+ age group. While male literacy was 67.78 per cent female literacy was 50.40 per cent. Bardhaman district had a total literacy of 70.18 per cent, male literacy being 78.63 per cent and female literacy being 60.95 per cent.

See also – List of West Bengal districts ranked by literacy rate

Literacy in CD blocks of
Bardhaman district
Bardhaman Sadar North subdivision
Ausgram I – 69.39%
Ausgram II – 68.00%
Bhatar – 71.56%
Burdwan I – 76.07%
Burdwan II – 74.12%
Galsi II – 70.05%
Bardhaman Sadar South subdivision
Khandaghosh – 77.28%
Raina I – 80.20%
Raina II – 81.48%
Jamalpur – 74.08%
Memari I – 74.10%
Memari II – 74.59%
Kalna subdivision
Kalna I – 75.81%
Kalna II – 76.25%
Manteswar – 73.08%
Purbasthali I – 77.59%
Purbasthali II – 70.35%
Katwa subdivision
Katwa I – 70.36%
Katwa II – 69.16%
Ketugram I – 68.00%
Ketugram II – 65.96%
Mongalkote – 67.97%
Durgapur subdivision
Andal – 77.25%
Faridpur Durgapur – 74.14%
Galsi I – 72.81%
Kanksa – 76.34%
Pandabeswar – 73.01%
Asansol subdivision
Barabani – 69.58%
Jamuria – 69.42%
Raniganj – 73.86%
Salanpur – 78.76%
2011 Census: CD Block Wise

Primary Census Abstract Data

=== Languages and religion ===
Religion in Mangalkote CD block (2011)
Hinduism	64.74%
Islam	34.93%
Other or not stated	0.33%

In the 2011 census Hindus numbered 170,420 and formed 64.74% of the population in Mangolkote CD Block. Muslims numbered 91,949 and formed 34.93% of the population. Christians numbered 500 and formed 0.19% of the population. Others numbered 371 and formed 0.14% of the population.

In Bardhaman district the percentage of Hindu population has been declining from 84.3% in 1961 to 77.9% in 2011 and the percentage of Muslim population has increased from 15.2% in 1961 to 20.7% in 2011.

Languages of Mangalkote CD block (2011)
1. Bengali (98.1%)
2. Santali (1.69%)
3. Others (0.25%)

At the time of the 2011 census, 98.06% of the population spoke Bengali and 1.69% Santali as their first language.

== Rural poverty ==
As per poverty estimates obtained from household survey for families living below poverty line in 2005, rural poverty in Mangalkote CD Block was 44.41%.

== Economy ==
=== Livelihood ===
In Mongalkote CD Block in 2011, amongst the class of total workers, cultivators formed 22.73%, agricultural labourers 54.03%, household industry workers 3.60% and other workers 19.65%.

In Mongalkote CD Block, cultivators or agricultural labourers formed a large portion of the workforce, comparatively less workers were engaged in the secondary and tertiary sectors.

=== Infrastructure ===
There are 130 inhabited villages in Mongalkote CD block. All 130 villages (100%) have power supply. All 130 villages (100%) have drinking water supply. 53 villages (40.77%) have post offices. All 130 villages (100%) have telephones (including landlines, public call offices and mobile phones). 66 villages (50.77%) have a pucca (paved) approach road and 76 villages (58.46%) have transport communication (includes bus service, rail facility and navigable waterways). 38 villages (29.23%) have agricultural credit societies. 27 villages (20.77%) have banks.

In 2013-14, there were 148 fertiliser depots, 5 seed stores and 75 fair price shops in the CD Block.

=== Agriculture ===
Persons engaged in agriculture
in Mongalkote CD Block
1. Bargadars (6.48%)
2. Patta holders (10.3%)
3. Small farmers (6.67%)
4. Marginal farmers (18.3%)
5. Agricultural labourers (58.2%)

Although the Bargadari Act of 1950 recognised the rights of bargadars to a higher share of crops from the land that they tilled, it was not implemented fully. Large tracts, beyond the prescribed limit of land ceiling, remained with the rich landlords. From 1977 onwards major land reforms took place in West Bengal. Land in excess of land ceiling was acquired and distributed amongst the peasants. Following land reforms land ownership pattern has undergone transformation. In 2013-14, persons engaged in agriculture in Mongalkote CD Block could be classified as follows: bargadars 6.48%, patta (document) holders 10.31%, small farmers (possessing land between 1 and 2 hectares) 6.67%, marginal farmers (possessing land up to 1 hectare) 18.30% and agricultural labourers 58.23%.

In 2003-04 net cropped area in Mongalkote CD Block was 30,077 hectares and the area in which more than one crop was grown was 17,805 hectares.

In 2013-14, Mongalkote CD Block produced 124,360 tonnes of Aman paddy, the main winter crop from 38,442 hectares, 856 tonnes of Aus paddy (summer crop) from 271 hectares, 71,544 tonnes of Boro paddy (spring crop) from 16,710 hectares, 63 tonnes of wheat from 21 hectares, 634 tonnes of jute from 33 hectares, 10,731 tonnes of potatoes from 770 hectares and 5,052 tonnes of sugar cane from 52 hectares. It also produced pulses and oilseeds.

In Bardhaman district as a whole Aman paddy constituted 64.32% of the total area under paddy cultivation, while the area under Boro and Aus paddy constituted 32.87% and 2.81% respectively. The expansion of Boro paddy cultivation, with higher yield rates, was the result of expansion of irrigation system and intensive cropping. In 2013-14, the total area irrigated in Mongalkote CD Block was 17,870.30 hectares, out of which 17,561.80 hectares were irrigated by canal water and 308.50 hectares by deep tube wells.

=== Banking ===
In 2013-14, Mongalkote CD Block had offices of 9 commercial banks and 4 gramin banks.

== Transport ==
Mongalkote CD Block has 6 ferry services and 20 originating/ terminating bus routes.

The Bardhaman-Katwa line after conversion from narrow gauge to electrified broad gauge was opened to the public on 12 January 2018. There are stations at Saota, Nigan, Kaichar and Bankapasi.

SH 7 running from Rajgram (in Birbhum district) to Midnapore (in Paschim Medinipur district) and State Highway 14 (West Bengal), running from Dubrajpur (in Birbhum district) to Betai (in Nadia district), cross in this CD Block.

== Education ==
In 2013-14, Mangolkote CD Block had 176 primary schools with 15,623 students, 4 middle schools with 249 students, 20 high school with 13,687 students and 10 higher secondary schools with 9,281 students. Mangolkote CD Block had 2 technical/ professional institutions with 200 students and 441 institutions for special and non-formal education with 1,798 students

As per the 2011 census, in Mongalkote CD block, amongst the 130 inhabited villages, 7 villages did not have a school, 67 villages had two or more primary schools, 41 villages had at least 1 primary and 1 middle school and 37 villages had at least 1 middle and 1 secondary school.

More than 6,000 schools (in erstwhile Bardhaman district) serve cooked midday meal to more than 900,000 students.

Mangalkote Government College was established at Mongalkote in 2015.

== Healthcare ==
In 2014, Mongalkote CD Block had 1 rural hospital, 1 block primary health centre and 4 primary health centres with total 81 beds and 10 doctors (excluding private bodies). It had 38 family welfare subcentres. 8,533 patients were treated indoor and 360,917 patients were treated outdoor in the hospitals, health centres and subcentres of the CD Block.

Singot Rural Hospital at Singot, PO Mathrun (with 50 beds) is the main medical facility in Mongalkote CD block. Mongalkote block primary health centre at Nutanhat functions with 15 beds. There are primary health centres at Chanakkasem, PO Kasem Nagar (with 6 beds), Khirogram (with 2 beds), Lakhoria (with 10 beds) and Nigon (with 6 beds).

Mongalkote CD Block is one of the areas of Bardhaman district which is affected by a low level of arsenic contamination of ground water.
