= Jageswardihi =

- Village
- Location in West Bengal, India Jageswardihi (India)
- Coordinates: 23.5667°N 88.0124°E
- Country: India
- State: West Bengal
- District: Purba Bardhaman

Population (2011)
  - Total: 4,404

Languages
  - Official: Bengali, English
- Time zone: UTC+5:30 (IST)
- PIN: 713143
- Lok Sabha constituency: Bolpur
- Vidhan Sabha constituency: Mangalkot
- Website: purbabardhaman.gov.in

Jageswardihi is a village in Mogalkote CD block in Katwa subdivision of Purba Bardhaman district in the Indian state of West Bengal.

== Geography ==
Cities and towns in the Katwa subdivision of Purba Bardhaman district
M: municipal city/ town, CT: census town, R: rural/ urban centre, H: historical place/ religious and/ or cultural centre, C: craft centre.
Owing to space constraints in the small map, the actual locations in a larger map may vary slightly

=== Location ===
Jageswardihi is located at 23.5667°N 88.0124°E.

=== Urbanisation ===
88.44% of the population of Katwa subdivision live in the rural areas. Only 11.56% of the population live in the urban areas. The map alongside presents some of the notable locations in the subdivision. All places marked in the map are linked in the larger full screen map.

== Demographics ==
As per the 2011 Census of India, Jageswardihi had a total population of 4,404 of which 2,217 (50.34%) were males and 2,187 (49.66%) were females. Population below 6 years was 525. Total literacy rate was 70.51% (Male 76.87%, Female 64.07%)

Caste-wise, most of the villagers are from Schedule Caste (SC). Schedule Caste (SC) constitutes 36.19% while Schedule Tribe (ST) were 0.02% of total population in Jageswardihi village.

== Economy ==
Jageswardihi is primarily an agricultural village, with farming as the main source of income. The village has a cold storage facility, which is used by farmers from Jageswardihi and surrounding areas to store crops, particularly potatoes.

== Education ==
Jageswardihi has several educational institutions serving the local population. The village has three government free primary schools and one Shishu Shiksha Kendra (SSK). For secondary education, students can attend Jageswardihi Bhuban Mohini Smriti Shiksha Niketan, the village’s high school.

== Culture ==
The dominant culture of Jageswardihi is identical to that of most of West Bengal and is deeply influenced by Hindu Bengali culture. Some of the popular festivals in Jageswardihi include:

- Jageswar Mela (April)
- Poyla Boishakh or Bengali New Year (14/15 April)
- Dharmaraj Puja
- Rath Yatra (July)
- Manasa Puja (September)
- Mahalaya (September/October)
- Durga Puja (September/October)
- Lakshmi Puja (October)
- Kali Puja (October/November) and Deepawali
- Kartik Puja (November)
- Saraswati Puja (February/March)
- Dol Purnima or Dol Yatra (February/March)

== Transport ==
Jageswardihi is on State Highway 14 (Bardhaman-Katwa Road).

Bankapasi railway station, situated on the Bardhaman-Katwa line is the nearest railway station to Jageswardihi.
