= Majigram =

- Village
- Location of Majigram in West Bengal, India Majigram (India)
- Coordinates: 23.59°N 87.97°E
- Country: India
- State: West Bengal
- District: Purba Bardhaman

Government
  - Type: Gram Panchayat
  - Prodhan: Anup Kumar Mandal

Area
  - Total: 12.76 km^{2} (4.93 sq mi)
- Elevation: 30 m (98 ft)

Population (2011)
  - Total: 4,622
  - Density: 362/km^{2} (940/sq mi)

Languages
  - Official: Bengali, English
- Time zone: UTC+5:30 (IST)
- PIN: 713132
- ISO 3166 code: IN-WB
- Vehicle registration: WB42
- Lok Sabha constituency: 41. Bolpur (SC)
- Vidhan Sabha constituency: Mongalkot
- Village code: 319124
- Nearest city: Katwa, Bardhaman

Majigram is a village in Mongalkote CD block in Katwa subdivision of Purba Bardhaman district in West Bengal, India.

== Geography ==
It is located 49 km north of the district headquarters Bardhaman. It is 141 km from the state capital, Kolkata. The village is near Bardhaman district's border with Birbhum District.

The region has an average elevation of 30 metres (100 ft). The nearby river is Ajay River.

== Demographics ==
As per the 2011 Census of India, Majigram had a total population of 4,622 of whom 2,360 (51%) were males and 2,262 (49%) were females. Population below 6 years was 534. The total number of literates in Majigram was 2,700 (66.05% of the population over 6 years).

=== Work profile ===
In Majigram village, out of total population, 1658 were engaged in work activities. 92.04% of workers described their work as main work (employment or earning more than six for months), while 7.96% were involved in marginal activity providing livelihood for less than six months. Of 1658 workers engaged in main work, 307 were cultivators (owner or co-owner) while 951 were agricultural labourers.

== Facilities ==
=== Transport ===
- Roads: Majigram is well connected with roads. The village contacted with Katwa-Natunhat Road.
- Railway: Bankapasi Railway Station (11 km) and Kaichar Railway Station (8 km) are the nearby railway stations to Majigram. However, Burdwan Railway Station is a major railway station which is 45 km from Majigram.
- Air: There is a permanent helipad in Majigram.

=== Hospital ===
Singot Rural Hospital (with 50 beds) at Singot is located nearby. There is also a rural health center in this village.

=== Banking ===
There is a UCO Bank Branch in Majigram. A UCO Bank ATM is also in Majigram. Reacently Burdwan Co-opprative Bank Lt. has opened a new branch with 24x7 ATM facility in this village.

=== Post office ===
- Majigram has a post office. Recently it was upgraded to "Sub-Post Office."

== Education ==
Main entrance gate of Majigram Bisweswari High School

Majigram Bisweswari High School (10+2 with science, arts and vocational streams) is an upper primary with a secondary and higher secondary school in Majigram village of Mongalkot. It was established in 1950. The school's management is the Department of Education. It is a Bengali medium, co-educational school.

Majigram Bisweswari High School runs in four government school buildings, and has a total of 44 classrooms. The lowest class in the school is 5 and the highest is 12. This school has 17 male teachers and 10 female teachers. There is a library facility available in this school, with about 4700 books.

This school has a big playground and cycle stand. There are enough toilets for girls and boys in the school. The school provides a residential facility. The school also provides a meal facility, and meals are prepared in the school. A good laboratory is there for science practicals. Freshwater facility also provided in the school.

Majigram Bisweswari High School also offers vocational courses including automobiles, electric, amin survey and computers.

Other schools include:

- Majigram Free Primary School
- Majigram Das Para Free Primary School

== Temples ==
Roypara Gopal Jeu Temple during its inauguration ceremony on 29 September 2014

Newly built Roypara Durga Devi Temple

Majigram has a multi-cultural heritage. The deuls found here are reminiscent of Bengali Hindu architecture. The old temples bear signs of Hinduism, mostly belonging to the Sakta and Vaishnava followers. There are many temples in Majigram.

Major temples:

- Sakombori (শাকম্ভরী দেবী) Temple
- Dauleshawr (দেউলেশ্বর শিব মন্দির) Lord Shiva Temple
- Dauleshawr (দেউলেশ্বর) Kali Mandir
- Radhamadhav (রাধামাধব) Temple
- Roypara Durga Temple
- Roypara Gopal Jeu Temple
- Gajon Temple
- Boro Voirovnath (ভৈরভনাথ) Temple
- Sardarpara Kali Mandir
- Parambabu's Kali Mandir
- Jogordharti (জগদ্ধাত্রী) Temple
- M.S.A. Kali Mandir
- Kakinder Shiva Mandir

There are many other temples in the village as well. More than 50 Lord Shiva temples are situated in Majigram.
