= Singot =

Singot Singat
- Village
- Location in West Bengal, India Singot (India)
- Coordinates: 23.5714°N 87.9814°E
- Country: India
- State: West Bengal
- District: Purba Bardhaman

Population (2011)
  - Total: 1,212

Languages
  - Official: Bengali, English
- Time zone: UTC+5:30 (IST)
- Lok Sabha constituency: Bolpur
- Vidhan Sabha constituency: Mangalkot
- Website: purbabardhaman.gov.in

Singot is a village in Mongalkote CD block in Katwa subdivision of Purba Bardhaman district in the Indian state of West Bengal.

== Geography ==
Cities and towns in the Katwa subdivision of Purba Bardhaman district
M: municipal city/ town, CT: census town, R: rural/ urban centre, H: historical place/ religious and/ or cultural centre, C: craft centre.
Owing to space constraints in the small map, the actual locations in a larger map may vary slightly

=== Location ===
Singot is located at 23.5714°N 87.9814°E.

=== Urbanisation ===
88.44% of the population of Katwa subdivision live in the rural areas. Only 11.56% of the population live in the urban areas. The map alongside presents some of the notable locations in the subdivision. All places marked in the map are linked in the larger full screen map.

== Demographics ==
As per the 2011 Census of India, Singat had a total population of 1,212 of which 634 (52%) were males and 578 (48%) were females. Population below 6 years was 128. The total number of literates in Singat was 615 (56.73% of the population over 6 years).

== Transport ==
Singot is on Katwa-Nutanhat Road.

== Healthcare ==
Singot Rural Hospital at Singot, PO Mathrun (with 50 beds) is the main medical facility in Mongalkote CD block. Mongalkote block primary health centre at Nutanhat functions with 15 beds. There are primary health centres at Chanakkasem, PO Kasem Nagar (with 6 beds), Khirogram (with 2 beds), Lakhoria (with 10 beds) and Nigon (with 6 beds).

See also - Healthcare in West Bengal
