= Kogram =

- Village
- Location in West Bengal, India Kogram (India)
- Coordinates: 23°32′20″N 87°53′53″E
- State: West Bengal
- District: Purba Bardhaman

Languages
  - Official: Bengali
- Time zone: UTC+5:30 (IST)
- Website: purbabardhaman.gov.in

Kogram is a village in Mongalkote CD block in Katwa subdivision of Purba Bardhaman district in West Bengal, India.

== History ==
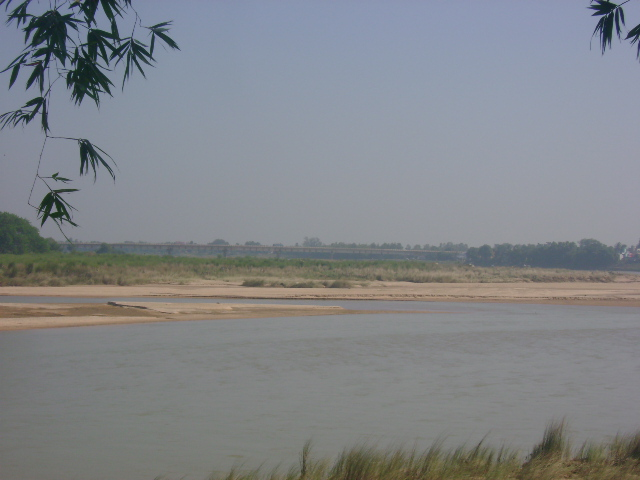
Ajay from Mangalchandi temple

According to Binoy Ghosh, Kogram is located at the confluence of the Ajay and the Kunur. The Ajay has been eating up parts of Kogram and pushing it back. In olden days Ujani or Ujaninagar (not to be confused with Ujjaini) covered a much bigger area, covering present day Kogram, Mongalkote and surrounding areas. Kabikankan Mukundaram (16th century poet), in his Chandimangal, as well as other poets of the era, have spoken of the fortified Ujani, its king Vikramkesari and its merchants. Ujani was the home of Dhanapati Sadagar. It was also the paternal home of Behula of Manasamangal fame. In the olden days, many merchants lived in the riverine territory now a part of Purba Bardhaman and Hooghly districts, with easy access to the port-town of Saptagram. Around 700 merchants are said to have come to Ujani to attend the last rites Dhanapati Sadagar’s father. The merchants had close links and were mostly centered around Karjana and Saptagram.

Binoy Ghosh says that it is thought that the merchant class had operated from this riverine territory for around fifteen hundred years and the merchant families amassed enormous wealth. It was a common practice to anchor or submerge the boats in ‘Bhramarar Daha’ when not in use. They used to sail to far off lands. Dhanapati Sadagar had sailed to what is present day Sri Lanka, and when he did not return for a long time, his son, Srimanta Sadagar, set sail in search of him. Life in the region was affected with the changing course of rivers and the arrival of European merchants.

See also - Kasba for Champaknagari of Chand Sadagar and Manasamangal fame.

== Geography ==
Cities and towns in the Katwa subdivision of Purba Bardhaman district
M: municipal city/ town, CT: census town, R: rural/ urban centre, H: historical place/ religious and/ or cultural centre, C: craft centre.
Owing to space constraints in the small map, the actual locations in a larger map may vary slightly

=== Location ===
It is located at 23°32′20″N 87°53′53″E.

=== Urbanisation ===
88.44% of the population of Katwa subdivision live in rural areas. Only 11.56% of the population live in urban areas. The map alongside show some of the notable locations in the subdivision. All places marked in the map are linked in the larger full screen map.

== Demographics ==
As per the 2011 Census of India Kogram had a total population of 383, of which 209 (55%) were males and 174 (45%) were females. Population below 6 years was 46. The total number of literates in Kogram was 219 (64.99% of the population over 6 years).

== Culture ==
Kumud Ranjan Mullick, a notable Bengali writer and poet, was born at Kogram on 3 March 1882, and wrote many of his poems there. He was a teacher at Mathrun School located nearby. Lochan Das, author of Chaitanya Mangala (16th century), was born at Kogram. There is a memorial temple in the village.

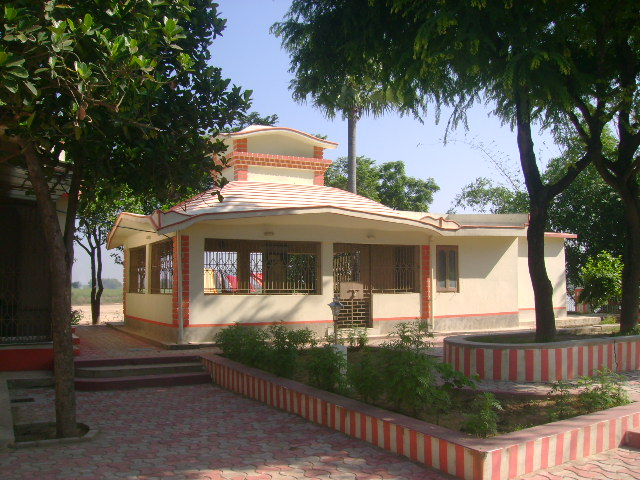
Mangalchandi temple

Kogram is a sakti peetha and is famous for the temple of goddess Chandi.

It is said that a piece of the right arm-bend of Sati fell at Kogram and it is considered one of the fifty one shakti peethas.

As in other parts of neighbouring rural Bengal, in the Ujani-Kogram area also, the non-Aryan content in the regional religious practices were predominant. There was conflict and gradual assimilation of other schools of thought. At one point of time Buddhist tantric practices and Jainism must have prevailed at Ujani. In the temple of Chandi there is an ancient idol of Gautam Buddha. Earlier, there was also an idol of Jain tirthankara Shantinatha – it was taken away and is now at Bangiya Sahitya Parishad in Kolkata.
