= Bankapasi =

- Village
- Location in West Bengal, India Bankapasi (India)
- Coordinates: 23.5741°N 88.0473°E
- Country: India
- State: West Bengal
- District: Purba Bardhaman

Population (2011)
  - Total: 6,250

Languages
  - Official: Bengali, English
- Time zone: UTC+5:30 (IST)
- Lok Sabha constituency: Bolpur
- Vidhan Sabha constituency: Mangalkot
- Website: purbabardhaman.gov.in

Bankapasi is a village in Mongalkote CD block in Katwa subdivision of Purba Bardhaman district in the Indian state of West Bengal.

== Geography ==
Cities and towns in the Katwa subdivision of Purba Bardhaman district
M: municipal city/ town, CT: census town, R: rural/ urban centre, H: historical place/ religious and/ or cultural centre, C: craft centre.
Owing to space constraints in the small map, the actual locations in a larger map may vary slightly

=== Location ===
Bankapasi is located at 23.5741°N 88.0473°E.

=== Urbanisation ===
88.44% of the population of Katwa subdivision live in the rural areas. Only 11.56% of the population live in the urban areas. The map alongside presents some of the notable locations in the subdivision. All places marked in the map are linked in the larger full screen map.

== Demographics ==
As per the 2011 Census of India, Bankapasi had a total population of 6,250 of which 3,160 (51%) were males and 3,090 (49%) were females. Population below 6 years was 710. The total number of literates in Bankapasi was 3,770 (68.05% of the population over 6 years).

== Economy ==
Bankapasi, Ketugram, Palita, Mohanpur, Kamarpara and Parhat are important centres of sholapith craft.

In a report by the Micro, Small and Medium Industries Development Institute, it says that the degree of excellence of products like, sola craft of Bankapasi and dhokra of Dwariapur is now acceptable to European markets.

== Transport ==
Bankapasi is on State Highway 14 (Bardhaman-Katwa Road).

Bankapasi railway station is situated on the Bardhaman-Katwa line.
