= Srikhanda railway station =

Railway Station in West Bengal

Srikhanda

General information
- Location: Srikhanda, Purba Bardhaman district, West Bengal; India
- Coordinates: 23.605756°N 88.071742°E
- Elevation: 23 m (75 ft)
- System: Indian Railways station and Kolkata Suburban Railway station
- Owner: Indian Railways
- Operator: Eastern Railway
- Line: Bardhaman–Katwa line
- Platforms: 1
- Tracks: 1

Construction
- Structure type: Standard (on-ground station)

Other information
- Status: Functioning
- Station code: SIZ
- Zone(s): Eastern Railway
- Division(s): Howrah

History
- Opened: 1915
- Closed: 2010
- Rebuilt: 2014–2018
- Electrified: 25 kV AC overhead
- Former names: McLeod's Light Railways

Services
Preceding station	Kolkata Suburban Railway	Following station
Bankapasi towards Barddhaman Junction	Eastern Line Bardhaman–Katwa line	Shripat Shrikhanda towards Katwa Junction
Route map
Location
- Location within West Bengal Location within India

Srikhanda railway station is a railway station in Bardhaman–Katwa line under Howrah railway division of Eastern Railway zone. It is situated at Srikhanda of Purba Bardhaman district in the Indian state of West Bengal.

== History ==
On 1 December 1915, McLeod's Light Railways (MLR) set up narrow-gauge lines in the Burdwan-Katwa Railway route. This railway section was handed over to the Eastern Railway in 1966. In 2010 the work started for conversion of 5 ft 6 in (1,676 mm) broad gauge. Bardhaman to Balogna railway station was reopened in 2014 and Balgona to Katwa section was completed on 12 January 2018 for the public.
