= Nutanhat =

- Census Town
- Location in West Bengal, India Nutanhat (India)
- Coordinates: 23°32′24.6″N 87°54′08.7″E
- Country: India
- State: West Bengal
- District: Purba Bardhaman

Population (2011)
  - Total: 5,349

Languages
  - Official: Bengali, English, Hindi
- Time zone: UTC+5:30 (IST)
- PIN: 713147 (Nutanhat)
- Telephone/STD code: 03453
- Lok Sabha constituency: Bolpur
- Vidhan Sabha constituency: Mangalkot
- Website: purbabardhaman.gov.in

Nutanhat is a census town in Mongalkote CD block in Katwa subdivision of Purba Bardhaman district in the state of West Bengal, India.

== Geography ==
Cities and towns in the Katwa subdivision of Purba Bardhaman district
M: municipal city/ town, CT: census town, R: rural/ urban centre, H: historical place/ religious and/ or cultural centre, C: craft centre.
Owing to space constraints in the small map, the actual locations in a larger map may vary slightly

=== Physical features ===
The Kunur, one of the main tributaries of the Ajay, joins the Ajay near Nutanhat.

=== CD block HQ ===
The headquarters of Mongalkote CD block are located at Nutanhat.

=== Urbanisation ===
88.44% of the population of Katwa subdivision live in the rural areas. Only 11.56% of the population live in the urban areas. The map alongside presents some of the notable locations in the subdivision. All places marked in the map are linked in the larger full screen map.

== Demographics ==
As per the 2011 Census of India Nutanhat had a total population of 5,349, of which 2,738 (51%) were males and 2,611 (49%) were females. Population below 6 years was 587. The total number of literates in Nutanhat was 3,328 (69.89% of the population over 6 years).

== Transport ==
The State Highway 7, running from Rajgram (in Murshidabad district) to Midnapore in (Paschim Medinipur district), passes through Nutanhat.

== Culture ==
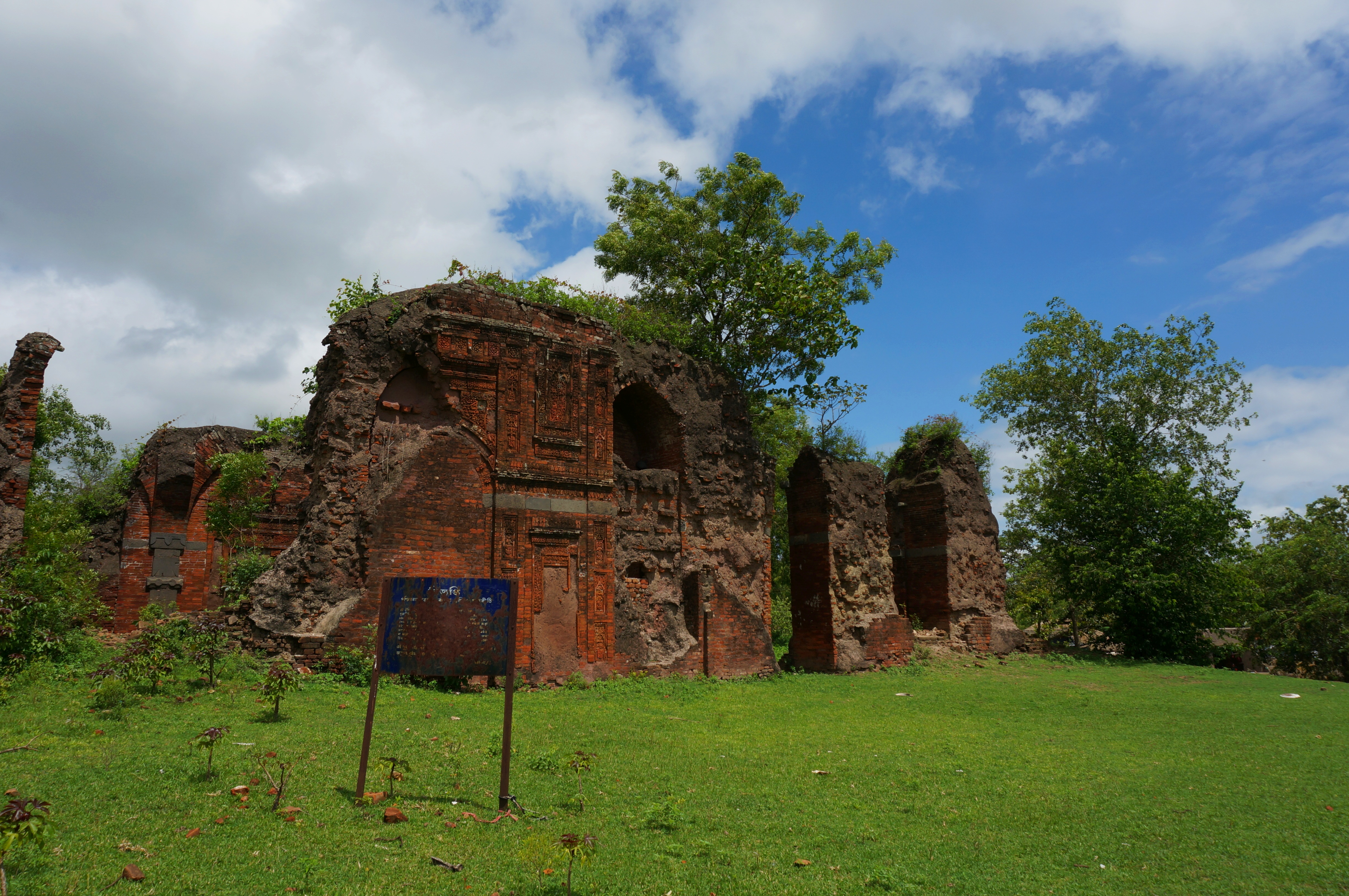
Remains of the Hassain Shahi mosque

Binoy Ghosh mentions that in the mosque belonging to the Hussain Shah era at Nutanhat there is a stone tablet in which there is mention of a king Sri Chandra Sen, whose identity is not clear.

== Healthcare ==
Singot Rural Hospital at Singot, PO Mathrun (with 50 beds) is the main medical facility in Mongalkote CD block. Mongalkote CD block primary health centre at Nutanhat functions with 15 beds. There are primary health centres at Chanakkasem, PO Kasem Nagar (with 6 beds), Khirogram (with 2 beds), Lakhoria (with 10 beds) and Nigon (with 6 beds). In 2012, the average monthly patients attending Mongalkote BPHC were 8,795 and average monthly admissions were 373. It handled 484 annual emergency admissions.

See also - Healthcare in West Bengal
