= Belmuri railway station =

Railway station in West Bengal, India

Belmuri

General information
- Location: Belmuri Bhandarhati Road, Bahadurpur, Hooghly district, West Bengal; India
- Coordinates: 22°55′58″N 88°09′08″E
- Elevation: 15 metres (49 ft)
- System: Kolkata Suburban Railway
- Owner: Indian Railways
- Operator: Eastern Railway
- Line: Howrah–Bardhaman chord
- Platforms: 3
- Tracks: 3

Construction
- Structure type: Standard (on ground station)
- Parking: No

Other information
- Status: Functioning
- Station code: BMAE
- Division(s): Howrah

History
- Opened: 1917
- Electrified: 1964
- Former names: East Indian Railway Company

Services
| Preceding station | Kolkata Suburban Railway | Following station |
|---|---|---|
| Porabazar towards Howrah Junction | Eastern Line Howrah–Bardhaman chord | Dhaniakhali towards Barddhaman Junction |
Route map
Location
- Location within West Bengal Location within India

Belmuri railway station is a Kolkata Suburban Railway station on the Howrah–Bardhaman chord line operated by Eastern Railway zone of Indian Railways. It is situated beside Belmuri Bhandarhati Road, Bahadurpur in Hooghly district in the Indian state of West Bengal. It is a widespread superstition that mentioning the station's name aloud is a harbinger of misfortune, so passengers and railway staff use such proxies as Majher Gram. Number of EMU trains stop at Belmuri railway station.

== History ==
The Howrah–Bardhaman chord, the 95 kilometers railway line was constructed in 1917. It was connected with Sealdah through Dankuni after construction of Vivekananda Setu in 1932. Howrah to Bardhaman chord line including Belmuri railway station was electrified in 1964–66.
