= Siddiqullah Chowdhury =

Indian politician

Siddiqullah Chowdhury সিদ্দিকুল্লাহ চৌধুরী
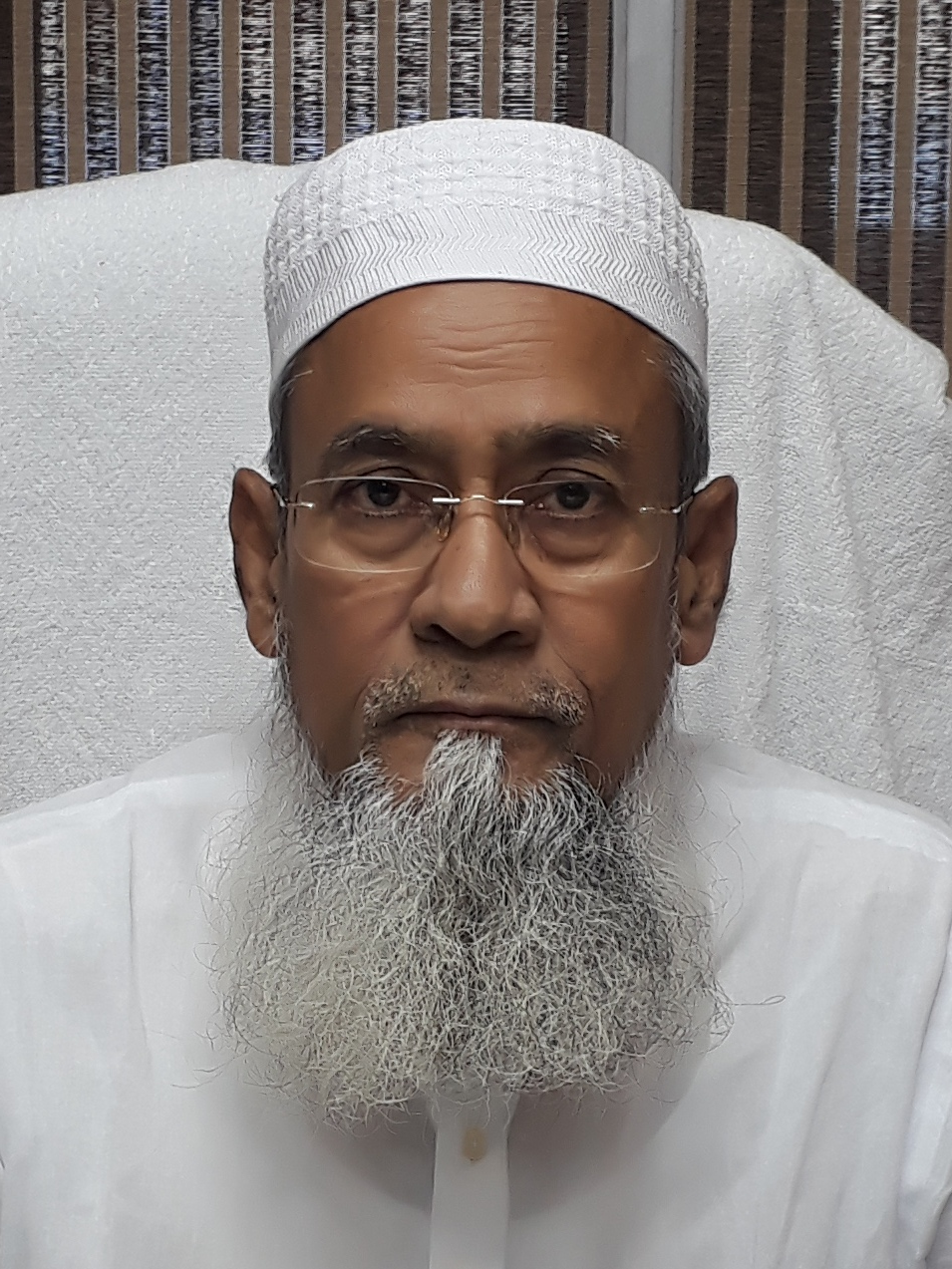
- Siddiqullah Chowdhury

Cabinet Minister Government of West Bengal
- In office 10 May 2021 – 7 May 2026
- Governor: CV Ananda Bose
- Chief Minister: Mamata Banerjee
- Ministry and Departments: Mass Education Extension and Library Services

Member of the West Bengal Legislative Assembly
- In office 2 May 2021 – 4 May 2026
- Preceded by: Saikat Panja
- Succeeded by: Saikat Panja
- Constituency: Monteswar
- In office 16 May 2016 – 2 May 2021
- Preceded by: Sajahan Chowdhury
- Succeeded by: Apurba Chowdhury
- Constituency: Mangalkot

Minister of State Government of West Bengal
- In office 20 May 2016 – 3 May 2021
- Governor: M. K. Narayanan; D. Y. Patil; Keshari Nath Tripathi; Jagdeep Dhankhar
- Chief Minister: Mamata Banerjee
- Ministry and Departments: Mass Education Extension and Library Services; Parliamentary Affairs
- Preceded by: Tapan Roy

Personal details
- Born: 10 January 1949 (age 77)
- Party: All India Trinamool Congress
- Other political affiliations: All India United Democratic Front; Jamiat Ulema-e-Hind
- Education: Darul Uloom Deoband
- Occupation: Politician

Siddiqullah Chowdhury (Bengali: সিদ্দিকুল্লাহ চৌধুরী) is an Indian politician from the state of West Bengal. He was the representative of Manteswar constituency in the West Bengal Legislative Assembly as a member of the All India Trinamool Congress (AITC) party. He is also the president of the Jamiat Ulema-e-Hind's West Bengal branch.

== Political career ==
Chowdhury contested the 1984 and 1989 Lok Sabha elections from Katwa constituency as a candidate of the Indian National Congress. Chowdhury has become a prominent figure in state politics during Nandigram Movement. Chowdhury also contested from the Basirhat seat as a candidate of the All India United Democratic Front in the 2014 Lok Sabha election.

In January 2016, Chowdhury hinted at the possibility of his Jamiat Ulema-e-Hind party entering into a pre-poll alliance for the 2016 West Bengal Assembly elections.

In March 2016, it was announced that Chowdhury would contest from the Mangalkot constituency as a candidate of the Trinamool Congress party. He said that the Mamata Banerjee-led government has worked for the development of minorities. He won the election by defeating his nearest rival, Sahajahan Chowdhury of Communist Party of India (Marxist), by nearly twelve thousand votes. He was subsequently made a cabinet minister and given the portfolio of minister of state with independent charge in mass education, library, and parliamentary affairs. He became one of the seven Muslims who was made a cabinet minister.

In December 2016, Chowdhury stated in an interview with the Indian Express that only 1.5% of West Bengal's population was using the government libraries. In response, Chowdhury said that the government was taking steps to "turn people back towards books and libraries". He also said that journals, magazines, and books about agriculture must be present in libraries funded by state government.

== Criticism ==
Chowdhury was criticized for inciting violence, as he led the protest against the Waqf Bill. He even threatened to bring West Bengal to standstill by mobilizing thousands of protesters. The protest led to massive damage to public property, injuring many and even killing few.

During the protest flags of various Islamic countries were carried and waved, while the protesters removed the saffron flag from a vehicle.

== Views ==
=== Indian Muslims ===
Chowdhury is of the opinion that Muslims should not learn patriotism from other citizens of the country or from the government. According to him, if Muslims had not participated in the Indian freedom struggle, then it would have taken "another 100 years" for India to become independent. He said that if India became a Hindu state, then India would collapse.

=== Government of Bangladesh ===
Chowdhury is critical of the Sheikh Hasina led government of Bangladesh. He said that assaulting pious citizens was a part of the Bangladesh government's conspiracy.

=== Triple Talaq ===
In August 2016, the Supreme Court of India banned the controversial practice of triple talaq (oral instant divorce). Reacting to it, Chowdhury said that the practice was an integral part of Islam. He termed the verdict of supreme court as "unconstitutional" and criticised it for interfering in Islamic laws. He also said that Muslims would continue to follow the sharia (Islamic laws). Opposition Bharatiya Janata Party national secretary Rahul Sinha demanded his arrest as according to him, Chowdhury refused to abide by the laws of the country.

== Controversies ==
On 17 May 2017, Ebela reported that Chowdhury was using a red beacon on his car to avoid traffic congestion after Government of India banned its use. He defended himself by contrasting his usage of the beacon with that of Noor ur Rahman Barkati, imam of Tipu Sultan Mosque, who had previously been spotted using it. Chowdhury said that unlike Barkati, his beacon was given to him by the state government and he had not received any notice from that authority to discontinue its use.

Regarding Barkati, Chowdhury commented that if he is to continue to live in India, he must follow Indian rules. He also stated his belief that Barkati would obtain a political position in Pakistan. Consequently, Barkati was sacked from his post.

== See also ==
- List of Deobandis
