= Shishir Ghosh =

Indian politician

Member of the West Bengal Legislative Assembly
- Incumbent
- Assumed office 4 May 2026
- Preceded by: Apurba Chowdhury
- Constituency: Mangalkot

Personal details
- Party: Bharatiya Janata Party
- Profession: Politician

Shishir Ghosh is an Indian politician from West Bengal. He is a member of West Bengal Legislative Assembly, from Mangalkot Assembly constituency.
