= Dhaniakhali railway station =

Railway halt station in West Bengal, India

Dhaniakhali
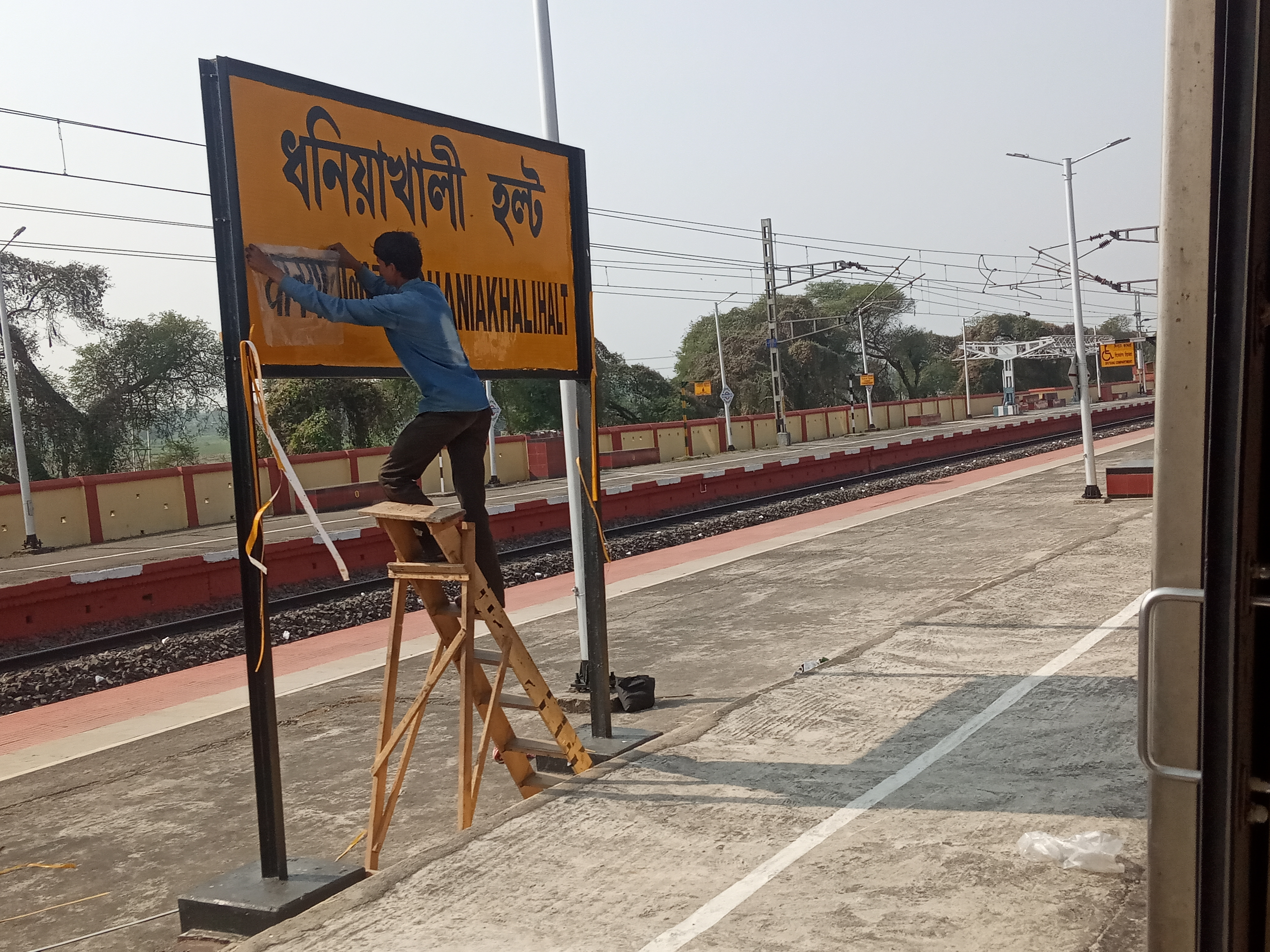
- Dhaniakhali halt railway station

General information
- Location: Chinsurah-Dhaniakhali Road, Dhaniakhali, Hooghly district, West Bengal; India
- Coordinates: 22°57′02″N 88°08′38″E
- Elevation: 14 metres (46 ft)
- System: Kolkata Suburban Railway
- Owner: Indian Railways
- Operator: Haradhan Bandyopadhyay
- Line: Howrah–Bardhaman chord
- Platforms: 3
- Tracks: 3

Construction
- Structure type: Standard (on ground station)
- Parking: No

Other information
- Status: Functioning
- Station code: DNHL
- Division(s): Howrah

History
- Opened: 2003
- Electrified: 1964
- Former names: East Indian Railway Company

Services
Preceding station	Kolkata Suburban Railway	Following station
Belmuri towards Howrah Junction	Eastern Line Howrah–Bardhaman chord	Sibaichandi towards Barddhaman Junction
Route map
Location
- Location within West Bengal Location within India

Dhaniakhali railway station is a Kolkata Suburban Railway halt station on the Howrah–Bardhaman chord line operated by Eastern Railway zone of Indian Railways. It is situated beside Chinsurah-Dhaniakhali Road, Rudrani at Dhaniakhali in Hooghly district in the Indian state of West Bengal. It was previously operated by Haradhan Bandyopadhyay who developed the halt station to Aadharsha station.

== History ==
The Howrah–Bardhaman chord, the 95 kilometers railway line was constructed in 1917. It was connected with Sealdah through Dankuni after construction of Vivekananda Setu in 1932. Howrah to Bardhaman chord line including Dhaniakhali railway station was electrified in 1964–66. This halt station was inaugurated in December 2003.
