= KCY =

KCY or kcy may refer to:

- KCY, the Amtrak station code for Kansas City Union Station, Missouri, United States
- KCY, the Indian Railways station code for Kaichar railway station, West Bengal, India
- kcy, the ISO 639-3 code for Korandje language, Algeria
- KCY-TV, The former branding of KCYU-LD
- Kelly's Coal Yard, coal merchant in Northern Ireland
