= Kshirgram =

Kshirgram Khirogram
- Village
- Location in West Bengal, India Kshirgram (India)
- Coordinates: 23.5141°N 88.0273°E
- Country: India
- State: West Bengal
- District: Purba Bardhaman

Population (2011)
  - Total: 2,474

Languages
  - Official: Bengali, English
- Time zone: UTC+5:30 (IST)
- ISO 3166 code: IN-WB
- Lok Sabha constituency: Bolpur
- Vidhan Sabha constituency: Mangalkot
- Website: purbabardhaman.gov.in

Kshirgram/ ক্ষীরগ্রাম (also written as Khirogram) is a village in Mongalkote CD block in Katwa subdivision of Purba Bardhaman district in the Indian state of West Bengal.

== Geography ==
Cities and towns in the Katwa subdivision of Purba Bardhaman district
M: municipal city/ town, CT: census town, R: rural/ urban centre, H: historical place/ religious and/ or cultural centre, C: Craft centre.
Owing to space constraints in the small map, the actual locations in a larger map may vary slightly

=== Location ===
Kshirgram is located at 23.5141°N 88.0273°E.

=== Urbanisation ===
88.44% of the population of Katwa subdivision live in the rural areas. Only 11.56% of the population live in the urban areas. The map alongside presents some of the notable locations in the subdivision. All places marked in the map are linked in the larger full screen map.

== Demographics ==
As per the 2011 Census of India, Kshirgram had a total population of 2,474 of which 1,260 (51%) were males and 1,214 (49%) were females. Population below 6 years was 242. The total number of literates in Kshirgram was 1,651 (73.97% of the population over 6 years).

== Culture ==
Khirogram is a satipith and is famous for its Yogadya and Shiva temples.

It is said that a piece of the large toe of the right leg of Sati fell at Kshirgram and it is considered one of the fifty one shakti peethas. At Kshirgram the goddess is known as Yogadya. The temple of Kshireswar is a little away from Kshirdighi.

The goddess Yogadya is worshipped at Kshirgram on Vaisakha sankranti and a big fair is organised. It is said that earlier there was no idol of the goddess at Kshirgram but both the puja and the fair were there. The goddess in an ugra-chandi form appeared in a dream to Haridutta, the king of Kshirgram and he got a stone image of the ten-armed Singhabahini goddess made and established it. The goddess is worshipped by the Ugra Kshatriyas in places other than Kshirgram, a day earlier.

When the idol of goddess Yogadya was once found broken, Nabin Bhaskar of Dainhat made an exact duplicate and the cost was borne by the Maharaja of Bardhaman.

== Transport ==
It is located about 23.2 kilometres (14.4 mi) from Katwa on the Katwa–Burdwan road.

Kshirgram is about 3 miles from the station at Kaichor on the Bardhaman-Katwa line.

== Healthcare ==
There is a primary health centre at Khirogram (with 2 beds).
