= Saikat Panja =

Indian politician (born 1992)

Saikat Panja (born 1992) is an Indian politician from West Bengal. He is a member of West Bengal Legislative Assembly from the Monteswar Assembly constituency in Purba Bardhaman district representing the Bharatiya Janata Party.

== Early life ==
Panja is from Monteswar, Purba Bardhaman district, West Bengal. He is the son of the late Sajal Panja. He did his BCom at a college affiliated with Calcutta University in 2012. He completed his MCom at University of Burdwan in the year 2014. He is a cultivator. He declared assets worth Rs.81 lakhs in 2021 and Rs.44 lakhs in 2026, in his affidavits to the Election Commission of India.

== Career ==
Panja won the Monteswar Assembly constituency representing the Bharatiya Janata Party in the 2026 West Bengal Legislative Assembly election. He polled 96,559 votes and defeated his nearest rival, Siddiqullah Chowdhury of the All India Trinamool Congress, by a margin of 14,798 votes.
