= Kumud Ranjan Mullick =

- কুমুদ রঞ্জন মল্লিক
- Born: 1 March 1883; Kogram, Bengal Presidency, British India (now in Purba Bardhaman district, West Bengal, India)
- Died: 14 December 1970 (aged 87); Ballygunge, Calcutta, West Bengal, India
- Occupations: Writer, Poets, Teacher
- Spouse: Sindhubala Devi
- Children: Jyosnanath Mullick
- Parent: Purnachandra Mullick (Father) Sureshkumari Devi (Mother)
- Awards: Jagattarini Gold Medal, Padma Shri(1970), Bankimchandra Subarna Padak (Gold Medal)

Kumud Ranjan Mullick (1883–1970) was a Bengali writer and poet. He was a poet of the Tagore era of Bengali literature. He was an early mentor and coach to the poet Kazi Nazrul Islam.

== Biography ==
He was born on 1 March 1883 in a Baidya family in a village named Kogram in Purba Bardhaman district of West Bengal, India. He graduated from the Scottish Church College of the University of Calcutta in 1905 and won the Bankimchandra Gold Medal. He started his teaching career at Mathrun Nabinchandra Vidyaytan in Purba Bardhaman where he later became the headmaster.

Kumud Ranjan's poetry was influenced by Vaishnavism. His poetry is also a portrait of rural Bengal. He was awarded the Jagattarini Gold Medal and the Padma Shri by the Government of India. He died on 14 December 1970.

== Main works ==
- Shatadal
- Bantulsi
- Ujani
- Ektara
- Bithi
- Banamallika
- Rajanigandha
- Nupur
- Chunkali
- Tunir
- Ajay
- Swarna Sandhya
- Dwarabati
- Kuheli
- Mukhoser Dokan

== Music Album ==
One memorable music album named Kumud Kabya Geeti was released by the Gramophone Co. of India, comprising some of his poems made into songs like 'Ajayer buke saradin', 'Ruper laagi jodi amaare bhalobasho', 'Jhapsa hoye aaschhe kromey', 'Latar bedona' & many more poems set to music by famous Bengali musical icons like Hemanta Mukherjee, Anup Ghoshal, Haimanti Sukla, Tarun Bandopadhyay and many more.

List of Kumdud Kabya Geeti sung by various celebrated singers from Bengal:

1. Ajayer Buke Saradin sung by Anup Ghoshal
2. Akashe Kalo Megher Mukhosh Pore sung by Alpana Sengupta
3. Dinpallir Metho Gaan sung by Hemanta Mukhopadhyay
4. Ruper Lagi Jodi Amare sung by Haimanti Sukla
5. Hoy To Amar E Pathe sung by Haimanti Sukla
6. Naiko Deri Chharbe Tori (With Recitation) sung by Arundhati Holme Chowdhury, Recitation by Pt. Shankar Ghosh
7. Mukul Jhare Mukul Jhare sung by Alpana Sengupta
8. Nidagher Chanpa Tumi sung by Anup Ghoshal
9. Bhabchhi Jakhan Jai Chole sung by Arundhati Holme Chowdhury

== Famous Disciple ==
One of his students, at the Mathrun Navinchandra Vidyalay, Burdwan where Kumud Ranjan was the Headmaster, later rose to become Bengal's best known Rebel poet, Kazi Najrul Islam.

== Awards ==
- Jagattarini Gold Medal of the University of Calcutta.
- Padma Shri by the Government of India in 1970.
