= Mongalkote =

- Town
- Location in West Bengal, India Mongalkote (India)
- Coordinates: 23°31′30.6″N 87°54′12.3″E
- Country: India
- State: West Bengal
- District: Purba Bardhaman

Population (2011)
  - Total: 11,537

Languages
  - Official: Bengali, English
- Time zone: UTC+5:30 (IST)
- PIN: 713147 (Mongalkote)
- Telephone/STD code: 03453
- Lok Sabha constituency: Bolpur
- Vidhan Sabha constituency: Mangalkot
- Website: purbabardhaman.gov.in

Mongalkote is a Town and Mongalkote CD block in Katwa subdivision of Purba Bardhaman district in the state of West Bengal, India.

== History ==
Mangalkote is an ancient place . In the Jataka tale (around 4th century BC) "Vessantara", the capital of Shivirattha kingdom was mentioned as a place called Jatuttara. In his publication "Sibi Kings Vessantara, His Country and Cultural Heritage" Asiwini Kumar Chowdhury has mentioned Jetuttara as being located at or near the present day Mangalkota.

== Geography ==
Cities and towns in the Katwa subdivision of Purba Bardhaman district
M: municipal city/ town, CT: census town, R: rural/ urban centre, H: historical place/ religious and/ or cultural centre, C: craft centre.
Owing to space constraints in the small map, the actual locations in a larger map may vary slightly

=== Physiography ===
Mangolkote is in the flat alluvial Kanksa Ketugram plain, which lies along the Ajay.

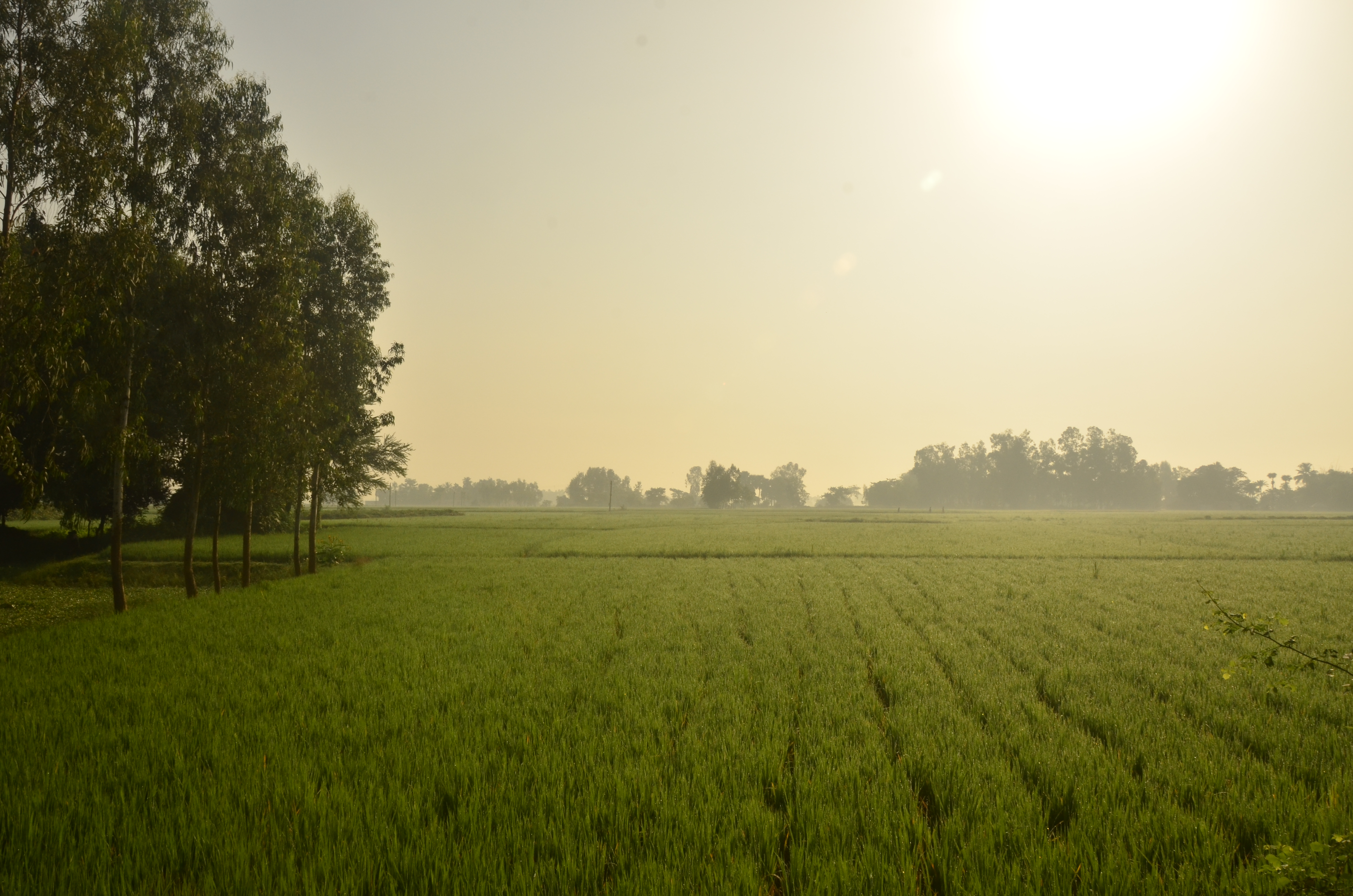
Paddy fields in Mongolkote

=== Police station ===
Mongalkote police station has jurisdiction over Mongalkote CD block. The area covered is 364.05 km^{2}.

=== Urbanisation ===
88.44% of the population of Katwa subdivision live in the rural areas. Only 11.56% of the population live in the urban areas. The map alongside presents some of the notable locations in the subdivision. All places marked in the map are linked in the larger full screen map.

== Demographics ==
As per the 2011 Census of India Mongalkote had a total population of 11,537, of which 5,876 (51%) were males and 5,661 (49%) were females. Population below 6 years was 1,508. The total number of literates in Mongalkote was 6,398 (63.79% of the population over 6 years).

== Transport ==
The State Highway 7, running from Rajgram (in Murshidabad district) to Midnapore (in Paschim Medinipur district), passes through Mongalkote.

== Education ==
Mangalkote Government College was established at Mongalkote in 2015. It offers honours courses in Bengali, English, history, political science, sociology and zoology.

== Culture ==
Visiting Mongalkote is a pilgrimage for Muslims. Many fairs and festivals are organised at Mongalkote – the death anniversary of Hamid Daneshmand Bangali is observed in Falgun, death anniversaries of Shah Zakir Ali Kaderi and Makdum Shah Gujrati are also celebrated. The fair of Pir Panchatan is organised. Muslims from different parts of Bengal and beyond come to Mongalkote on these occasions. Special mention may be made of Maulana Hamid Daneshmand, a great scholar. Emperor Shah Jahan had visited him at Mongalkote. There is a mosque near the grave of Daneshmand – it was built under instructions from the emperor. There are several other mosques in Mongalkote.

== Healthcare ==
Mongalkote block primary health centre at Nutanhat functions with 15 beds. In 2012, the average monthly patients attending Mongalkote BPHC were 8,795 and average monthly admissions were 373. It handled 484 annual emergency admissions.

See also - Healthcare in West Bengal
