= Sajal Panja =

Indian politician 1968–2016

Sajal Panja (1968 – 23 September 2016) was an Indian politician from West Bengal. He was a former member of the West Bengal Legislative Assembly from Monteswar Assembly constituency in Purba Bardhaman district. He was elected in the 2016 West Bengal Legislative Assembly election representing the All India Trinamool Congress. He died after getting elected necessitating a by election in November 2016.

== Early life and education ==
Panja was from Purbasthali Uttar, Purba Bardhaman district, West Bengal. He was the son of late Prafulla Panja. He had two sons, who lived in Howrah along with their mother. His son, Saikat Panja, became an MLA after his death. He studied Class 12 and passed the higher secondary examinations conducted by the West Bengal Council of Higher Secondary Education in 1980. He was into cultivation.

== Career ==
Panja was elected in the Monteswar Assembly constituency representing the All India Trinamool Congress in the 2016 West Bengal Legislative Assembly election. He polled 84,134 votes and defeated his nearest rival, Chaudhuri Md. Hedayatullah of the Communist Party of India (Marxist), by a margin of 706 votes. He was on the Legislative Assembly's Petition Committee on Illegal Mining and Thalassemia Treatment.

=== Death ===
Panja died of a massive heart attack on 23 September 2016 at the Digha State General Hospital during a tour to Digha.
