= Monteswar Assembly constituency =

Constituency of the West Bengal Legislative Assembly, in India

Monteswar
- Constituency No. 263 for the West Bengal Legislative Assembly
- Interactive Map Outlining Monteswar Assembly Constituency

Constituency details
- Country: India
- Region: East India
- State: West Bengal
- District: Purba Bardhaman
- Lok Sabha constituency: Bardhaman–Durgapur
- Established: 1951
- Total electors: 191,654
- Reservation: None

Member of Legislative Assembly
- 18th West Bengal Legislative Assembly
- Incumbent Saikat Panja
- Party: BJP
- Alliance: NDA
- Elected year: 2026

Monteswar Assembly constituency is an assembly constituency in Purba Bardhaman district in the Indian state of West Bengal.

== Overview ==
As per orders of the Delimitation Commission, No. 263 Monteswar assembly constituency covers Baghsan, Vagra Mulgram, Denur, Jamna, Kusumgram, Majhergram, Mamudpur I, Monteswar, Pipalan and Shushunia gram panchayats of Manteswar community development block and Barapalason I, Barapalason II, Bohar I, Bohar II, Bijur I, Bijur II and Satgachhia I gram panchayats of Memari II community development block.

As per orders of Delimitation Commission it is part of No. 39 Bardhaman-Durgapur Lok Sabha constituency. Monteswar assembly segment was earlier part of Katwa Lok Sabha constituency.

== Members of the Legislative Assembly ==
Year	Name	Party
1951	Ananda Prasad Mandal	Indian National Congress
1957	Bhakta Chandra Roy	Independent
1962	Syed Abul Mansur Habibullah	Communist Party of India
1967	N. C. Chaudhuri	Indian National Congress
1969	Kashinath Hazra Choudhury	Communist Party of India (Marxist)
1971	Kashinath Hazra Choudhury	Communist Party of India (Marxist)
1972	Tuhin Kumar Samanta	Indian National Congress
1977	Hemanta Kumar Roy	Communist Party of India (Marxist)
1982	Hemanta Roy	Communist Party of India (Marxist)
1987	Hemanta Roy	Communist Party of India (Marxist)
1991	Abu Ayesh Mondal	Communist Party of India (Marxist)
1996	Abu Ayesh Mondal	Communist Party of India (Marxist)
2001	Abu Ayesh Mondal	Communist Party of India (Marxist)
2006	Chaudhuri Mohammad Hedayetullah	Communist Party of India (Marxist)
2011	Chaudhuri Mohammad Hedayetullah	Communist Party of India (Marxist)
2016	Sajal Panja	Trinamool Congress
2016^	Saikat Panja	Trinamool Congress
2021	Siddiqullah Chowdhury	Trinamool Congress
2026	Saikat Panja	Bharatiya Janata Party

- ^ denotes by-election

== Election results ==
=== 2026 ===
2026 West Bengal Legislative Assembly election: Monteswar
Party	Candidate	Votes	%	±%
BJP	Saikat Panja	96,559	47.29	▲12.05
AITC	Siddiqullah Chowdhury	81,761	40.05	▼10.4
CPI(M)	Anupam Ghosh	18,192	8.91	▼2.93
INC	Jyotirmay Mondal	2,674	1.31	
AJUP	Samsul Hoque Sheikh	2,114	1.04	
NOTA	None of the above	1,360	0.67	▼0.1
Majority		14,798	7.24	▼7.97
Turnout		204,165	94.1	▲7.8
BJP gain from AITC		Swing		

=== 2021 ===
2021 West Bengal Legislative Assembly election: Monteswar
Party	Candidate	Votes	%	±%
AITC	Siddiqullah Chowdhury	105,460	50.45	▼27.62
BJP	Saikat Panja	73,655	35.24	▲26.72
CPI(M)	Anupam Ghosh	24,740	11.84	▲1.14
NOTA	None of the above	1,611	0.77	
Majority		31,805	15.21	
Turnout		209,036	86.3	
AITC hold		Swing		

=== 2016 by-election ===
2016 West Bengal Legislative Assembly by-election: Monteswar
Party	Candidate	Votes	%	±%
AITC	Saikat Panja	147,316	78.07	▲33.96
CPI(M)	Mohammad Osman Gani Sarkar	20,189	10.70	▼33.04
BJP	Biswajit Poddar	16,073	8.52	▲1.44
INC	Bulbul Ahmed Sheikh	2,885	1.53	New entry
CPI(ML)L	Ansarul Aman Mondal	1,463	0.78	New entry
NOTA	None of the above	1,168	0.62	▼0.66
PDS	Sheikh Ekramul Hossain	778	0.41	New entry
Majority		1,27,127	67.37	▲67.00
Turnout		1,89,872	86.91	▼0.14
AITC hold		Swing		

=== 2016 ===
2016 West Bengal Legislative Assembly election: Monteswar
Party	Candidate	Votes	%	±%
AITC	Sajal Panja	84,134	44.11	▼1.23
CPI(M)	Chowdhury Md. Hedayatullah	83,428	43.74	▼3.50
BJP	Biswajit Poddar	15,452	8.10	▲5.77
BSP	Khokan Das	2,644	1.39	▲0.78
NOTA	None of the above	2,445	1.28	New entry
MPOI	Jagabandhu Malik	1,437	0.75	New entry
JDP	Premchand Soren	1,190	0.62	▼0.56
Majority		706	0.37	▼1.53
Turnout		1,90,730	87.05	▼3.23
AITC gain from CPI(M)		Swing		

=== 2011 ===
2011 West Bengal Legislative Assembly election: Monteswar
Party	Candidate	Votes	%	±%
CPI(M)	Chowdhury Md. Hedayatullah	81,822	47.24	
AITC	Abu Ayesh Mondal	78,524	45.34	
PDCI	Abdul Kased Sheikh	4,890	2.87	
BJP	Sakshi Gopal Ghosh	4,027	2.33	
JDP	Sunil Soren	2,036	1.18	
BSP	Sukumar Das	1,064	0.61	
CPI(ML)L	Annada Prasad Bhattachorya	824	0.48	
Majority		3,298	1.90	
Turnout		1,73,187	90.28	
CPI(M) hold		Swing		

=== 2006 ===
Narayan Hazra Chowdhury of Trinamool Congress lost the Monteswar Assembly seat in 2006 defeated by Chaudhuri Md. Hedayatullah of CPI(M) . Contests in most years were multi cornered but only winners and runners are being mentioned. In 2001, 1996 and 1991, Abu Ayesh Mondal of CPI(M) defeated Narayan Hazara Choudhury of Trinamool Congress, Debabrata Roy of Congress and Biseswar Bhattacharya of Congress in the respective years. In 1982 and 1977, Hemanta Roy of CPI(M) defeated Tuhin Samanta of Congress.

=== 1972 ===
In 1972, Tuhin Samanta of Congress won the seat. In 1971 and 1969, Kashinath Hazra Choudhury of CPI(M) won the seat. N.C.Chaudhuri of Congress won the seat in 1967. Syed Abul Mansur Habibullah of CPI won the seat in 1962. Bhakta Chandra Roy (Independent) won the seat in 1957. Ananda Prasad Mondal of Congress won the seat in independent India's first election in 1951.
