= Apurba Chowdhury =

Indian politician

Apurba Chowdhury (born 1966) is an Indian politician from West Bengal. He is a member of the West Bengal Legislative Assembly from Mangalkot Assembly constituency in Purba Bardhaman district. He won the 2021 West Bengal Legislative Assembly election representing the All India Trinamool Congress party.

== Early life and education ==
Chowdhury is from Mangalkot, Purba Bardhaman district, West Bengal. He is the son of late Jagannath Chowdhury. He studied Class 10 at Kshirgram Sri Jogyada Banipith, Kalna, and passed Madhyamik, the centralised examinations conducted by West Bengal Board of Secondary Education in 1981. His wife runs her own business.

== Career ==
Chowdhury won from Mangalkot Assembly constituency representing the All India Trinamool Congress in the 2021 West Bengal Legislative Assembly election. He polled 107,596 votes and defeated his nearest rival, Rana Protap Goswami of the Bharatiya Janata Party, by a margin of 22,337 votes. In the 2011 West Bengal Legislative Assembly election, Sahajahan Chowdhury of the Communist Party of India (Marxist) defeated Apurba Chaudhuri of Trinamool Congress.
