= Kunur River =

Coordinates: 23°31′59″N 87°54′06″E

- Native name: কুনুর নদ (Bengali)

Location
- Country: India
- State: West Bengal
- City: Guskara, Nutanhat

Physical characteristics
- Source
  - location: TILABONI, Faridpur, Durgapur
- Mouth: Nutanhat
  - location: Nutanhat
- Length: 112 km (70 mi)
- Discharge
  - location: Ajay River

Kunur River, one of the main tributaries of the Ajay, 112 kilometres (70 mi) in length, has its origin near Bansgara in the Faridpur police station area. With water from several small streams swelling it during the monsoons, it often floods large areas of the Ausgram community blocks and Mangalkot police stations of Bardhaman district. It joins the Ajay near Nutanhat city.

== Archaeology ==
Microliths of crystalline stone and petrified wood from about 1250–1000 BC are found in many places in the Ajay-Kunur-Kopai river system.
