= Healthcare in West Bengal =

Healthcare in West Bengal features a universal health care system run by the state and the federal governments. The Constitution of India charges every state with "raising of the level of nutrition and the standard of living of its people and the improvement of public health as among its primary duties". Ministry of Health & Family Welfare of the Government of West Bengal is responsible for administering and funding the public hospital system in the state. The entire state population is covered by a health insurance, either provided by their employer or the Employees’ State Insurance (if the employee’s salary is up Rs 21000/month). Other categories of people (low-income, self-employed, the unemployed or the retired etc.) are covered under the state’s public health insurance scheme (Swasthya Sathi). As of 2021, the total public healthcare budget of the state is ₹16,368 crore (US$1.7 billion), out of which ₹10,922 crore (US$1.1 billion) was earmarked for public hospitals, ₹2,000 crore (US$210 million) was to be spent on the public health insurance program (Swasthya Sathi) and ₹5,246 crore (US$540 million) is to be spent on primary health services. An additional ₹1,000 crore (US$100 million), outside the official health budget, was to be spent on health insurance coverage for the current and retired employees of the state government. Healthcare forms roughly 4.5% of the state's entire budget which critics say should be increased to at least 8% in line with the National Health Policy.

== Healthcare infrastructure ==
The health care infrastructure is divided into three tiers — the primary health-care network, a secondary care system comprising district and sub-divisional hospitals and tertiary hospitals providing specialty and super specialty care. A Chief Medical Officer of Health (C.M.O.H.) heads each of the eighteen districts. The responsibility of CMOH is to manage the primary health care sector and ensure the effective implementation of the various medical, health and family welfare programmes. The secondary level hospitals (sub-divisional and district hospitals) are headed by superintendents who report to the C.M.O.H. and are accountable to a hospital management committee. At the block level, the Block Medical Officer of Health (BMOH) is responsible for providing services and for monitoring and supervising the primary health centres and health programme implementation.

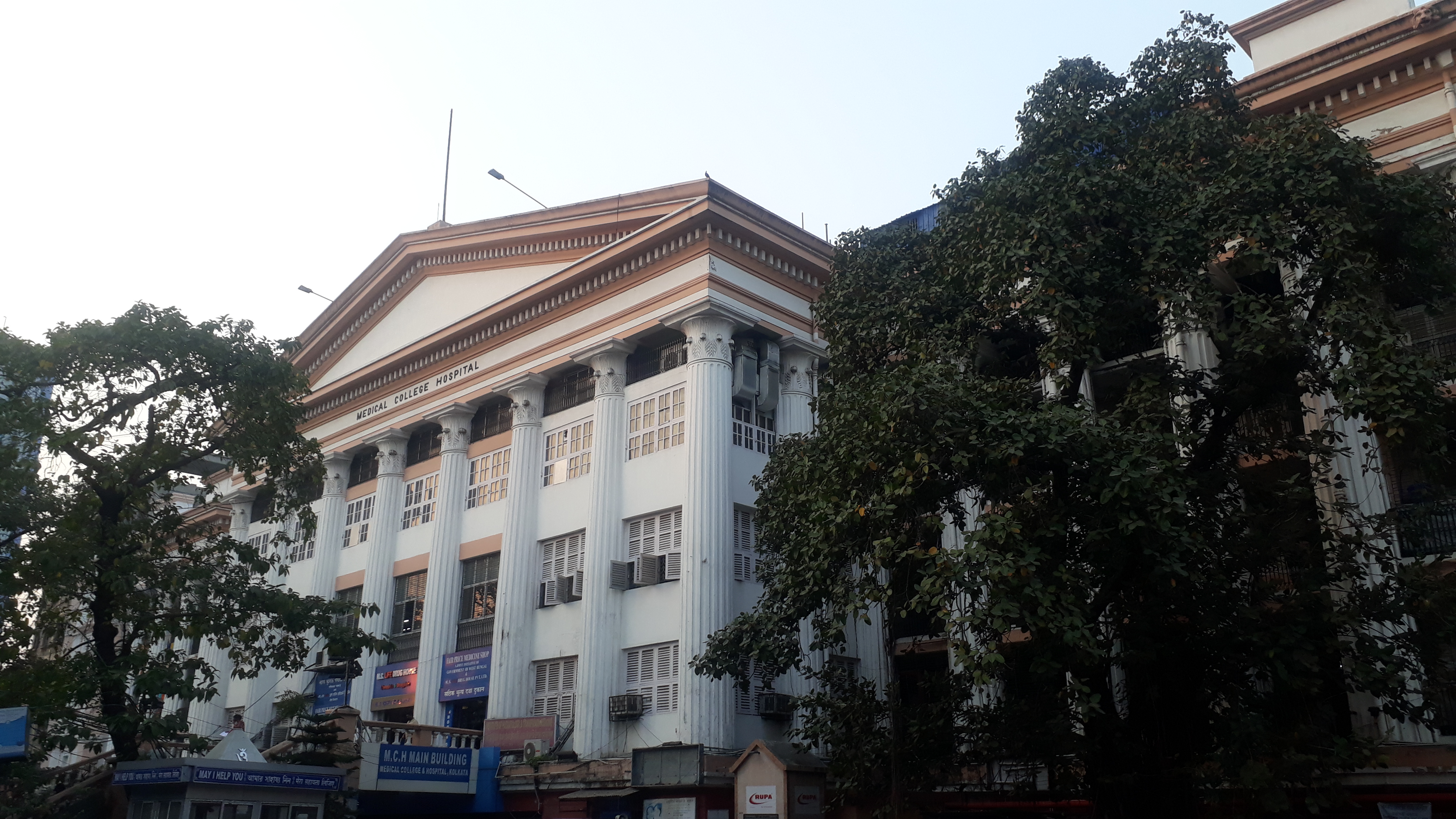
Medical College and Hospital, Kolkata, the second institution in Asia to teach modern medicine (after 'Ecole de Médicine de Pondichéry')

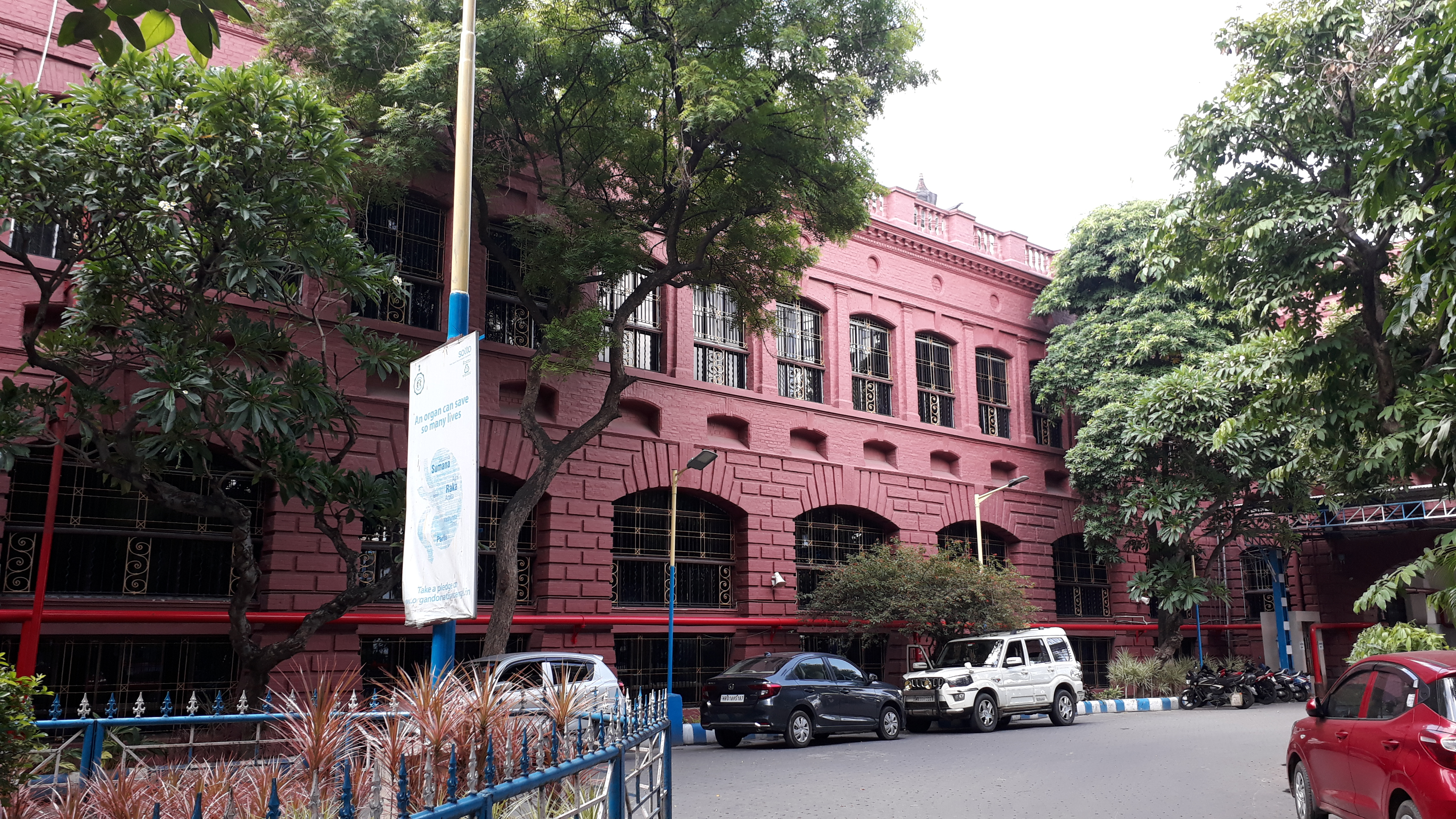
IPGMER and SSKM Hospital, largest hospital in West Bengal and one of the oldest in Kolkata.

West Bengal Health Service provides the health care professionals for the statewide infrastructure, while Medical Education Service employs teachers at the training institutions.

The number and beds sanctioned in different types of healthcare setup, as published by the government of West Bengal, are in the following table. In this table, hospitals under other departments of state government include government undertaking organisations, and rural hospitals include those ones which were upgraded from block primary health centre.

Type of institution	number	Number of beds sanctioned
Hospitals/health centers under department of Health and Family Welfare		
Medical College Hospital	13	12,641
District hospital	15	8,204
Subdivisional hospital	45	9,901
State general hospital	33	4,899
Other hospital	33	6,504
Rural hospital	269	8,820
Block Primary health centre	79	1,086
Primary health centre	909	6,592
Subcentre	10,356	0
Hospitals under other departments of state government	72	6,212
Hospitals under local body	31	1,080
Hospitals under government of India	58	7,126
Hospitals under NGO/private	2,013	34,281
Total	13,925	1,07,346

== Healthcare indices ==
Following table illustrates some health care indicators of the state, compared to the national indicator, and comparison with some major states that fared better than West Bengal (states with population 20 millions or more as of 2011 national census were considered as major states for this table). These data are based on Sample Registration System of Office of the Registrar General and Census Commissioner, India.

Indicator (with year)	West Bengal	India	Rank in India	Major states better than West Bengal
Birth rate, 2010	16.8	22.1	4	Kerala (14.8), Tamil Nadu (15.9), Punjab(16.6)
Death rate, 2010	6.0	7.2	1	none
Infant mortality rate, 2010	31	47	4	Kerala (13), Tamil Nadu (24), Maharashtra (28)
Total fertility rate, 2009	1.9	2.6	2	Kerala (1.7), Tamil Nadu (1.7)
Neonatal mortality rate, 2009	25	34	4	Kerala (7), Tamil Nadu (18), Maharashtra (24)
Under 5 mortality rate, 2009	40	64	4	Kerala (14), Tamil Nadu (33), Maharashtra (36)
Maternal mortality ratio, 2007–2009	145	212	5	Kerala (81), Tamil Nadu (97), Maharashtra (104), Andhra Pradesh (134)
