= Mangalkot Assembly constituency =

Mangalkot
- Constituency No. 272 for the West Bengal Legislative Assembly
- Interactive Map Outlining Mangalkot Assembly Constituency

Constituency details
- Country: India
- Region: East India
- State: West Bengal
- District: Purba Bardhaman
- Lok Sabha constituency: Bolpur
- Established: 1951
- Total electors: 202,581
- Reservation: None

Member of Legislative Assembly
- 18th West Bengal Legislative Assembly
- Incumbent Shishir Ghosh
- Party: BJP
- Alliance: NDA
- Elected year: 2026

Mangalkot Assembly constituency is an assembly constituency in Purba Bardhaman district in the Indian state of West Bengal.

== Overview ==
As per orders of the Delimitation Commission, No. 272 Mangalkot assembly constituency covers Mongalkote community development block and Saragram, Gidhgram and Alampur gram panchayats of Katwa I CD Block.

Mangalkot assembly constituency is part of No. 41 Bolpur Lok Sabha constituency.

== Members of the Legislative Assembly ==
| Year | Name | Party |
|---|---|---|
| 1951 | Bhakta Chandra Roy | Indian National Congress |
| 1957 | No seat | |
| 1962 | Narayandas Das | Communist Party of India |
| 1967 | N. Sattar | Indian National Congress |
| 1969 | Nikhilananda Sar | Communist Party of India (Marxist) |
| 1971 | Nikhilananda Sar | Communist Party of India (Marxist) |
| 1972 | Jyotirmoy Mojumdar | Indian National Congress |
| 1977 | Nikhilananda Sar | Communist Party of India (Marxist) |
| 1982 | Nikhilananda Sar | Communist Party of India (Marxist) |
| 1987 | Nikhilananda Sar | Communist Party of India (Marxist) |
| 1991 | Samar Baora | Communist Party of India (Marxist) |
| 1996 | Sadhana Mallick | Communist Party of India (Marxist) |
| 2001 | Sadhana Mallick | Communist Party of India (Marxist) |
| 2006 | Sadhana Mallick | Communist Party of India (Marxist) |
| 2011 | Sahajahan Choudhary | Communist Party of India (Marxist) |
| 2016 | Siddiqullah Chowdhury | Trinamool Congress |
| 2021 | Apurba Chowdhury | Trinamool Congress |
| 2026 | Shishir Ghosh | Bharatiya Janata Party |

== Election results ==
=== 2026 ===
2026 West Bengal Legislative Assembly election: Mangalkot
| Party | Candidate | Votes | % | ±% |
|---|---|---|---|---|
| BJP | Shishir Ghosh | 104,020 | 47.44 | ▲8.21 |
| AITC | Apurba Chowdhury | 91,297 | 41.64 | ▼7.87 |
| CPI(M) | Miraj Alam Sekh | 12,698 | 5.79 | ▼1.93 |
| INC | Jagadish Dutta | 3,117 | 1.42 | |
| NOTA | None of the above | 3,423 | 1.56 | ▼0.2 |
| Majority | | 12,723 | 5.8 | ▼4.48 |
| Turnout | | 219,247 | 94.42 | ▲7.84 |
| BJP gain from AITC | | Swing | | |

=== 2021 ===
2021 West Bengal Legislative Assembly election: Mangalkot
| Party | Candidate | Votes | % | ±% |
|---|---|---|---|---|
| AITC | Apurba Chowdhury | 107,596 | 49.51 | ▲3.64 |
| BJP | Rana Pratap Goswami | 85,259 | 39.23 | ▲28.62 |
| CPI(M) | Sahajahan Chowdhury | 16,783 | 7.72 | ▼32.09 |
| BSP | Abdus Saber Sheikh | 2,476 | 1.14 | ▼0.55 |
| NOTA | None of the above | 3,826 | 1.76 | |
| Majority | | 22,337 | 10.28 | |
| Turnout | | 217,329 | 86.58 | |
| AITC hold | | Swing | | |

=== 2016 ===
2016 West Bengal Legislative Assembly election: Mangalkot
| Party | Candidate | Votes | % | ±% |
|---|---|---|---|---|
| AITC | Siddiqullah Chowdhury | 89,812 | 45.87 | ▼0.28 |
| CPI(M) | Sahajahan Chowdhury | 77,938 | 39.81 | ▼6.41 |
| BJP | Gopal Chattopadhyay | 20,780 | 10.61 | ▲6.50 |
| BSP | Ramkrishna Malik | 3,315 | 1.69 | ▲0.20 |
| NOTA | None of the above | 2,210 | 1.13 | New entry |
| SUCI(C) | Rasik Saren | 1,731 | 0.88 | New entry |
| Majority | | 11,874 | 6.06 | ▲5.99 |
| Turnout | | 1,95,786 | 85.75 | ▼1.07 |
| AITC gain from CPI(M) | | Swing | | |

=== 2011 ===
2011 West Bengal Legislative Assembly election: Mangalkot
| Party | Candidate | Votes | % | ±% |
|---|---|---|---|---|
| CPI(M) | Sahajahan Chowdhury | 81,316 | 46.22 | |
| AITC | Apurba Chowdhury | 81,190 | 46.15 | |
| BJP | Alok Taranga Goswami | 7,224 | 4.11 | |
| JDP | Anil Kumar Mardi | 3,567 | 2.03 | |
| BSP | Sukumar Malik | 2,630 | 1.49 | |
| Majority | | 126 | 0.07 | |
| Turnout | | 1,75,927 | 86.82 | |
| CPI(M) hold | | Swing | | |

=== 2006 ===
Sadhana Mallik of CPI(M) won the Mangalkot assembly seat in 2006, 2001, and 1996 defeating Abdul Based Shekh of Trinamool Congress in 2006, Chandranath Mukherjee of Trinamool Congress in 2001, and Absar Nurul Mondal of Congress in 1996. Contests in most years were multi cornered but only winners and runners are being mentioned. Samar Baora of CPI(M) defeated Hriday Kishan Sar of Congress in 1991. Nikhilananda Sar of CPI(M) defeated Jagadish Dutta of in 1987, Seikh Borshed of Congress in 1982, and Madan Chowdhury of Congress in 1977.

=== 1972 ===
Jyotirmoy Majumder of Congress won in 1972. Nikhilananda Sar of CPI(M) won in 1971 and 1969. N.Sattar of Congress won in 1967. Narayan Das of CPI won in 1962. The Mangalkot seat was not there in 1957. In independent India's first election in 1951, Bhakta Chandra Roy of Congress won the Mangalkot seat.
