= Barddhaman Junction railway station =

Railway Station in West Bengal, India

Barddhaman Junction বর্ধমান জংশন
- Barddhaman Junction Railway Station Building

General information
- Location: Grand Trunk Road, Bardhaman, West Bengal; India
- Coordinates: 23°15′00″N 87°52′12″E
- Elevation: 34.00 metres (111.55 ft)
- System: Indian Railways; Kolkata Suburban Railway
- Owner: Indian Railways
- Operator: Eastern Railway
- Lines: Howrah–Delhi main line; Howrah–Gaya–Delhi line; Howrah–Prayagraj–Mumbai line; Howrah–New Jalpaiguri line; Howrah–Bardhaman main line, Howrah–Bardhaman chord; Bardhaman-Rampurhat Line; Bardhaman–Asansol section; Bardhaman–Katwa line
- Platforms: 8
- Tracks: 10
- Connections: Cabs, Bus stand, E-rickshaw

Construction
- Structure type: At grade
- Parking: Available
- Cycle facilities: Available
- Accessible: Available

Other information
- Status: Functioning
- Station code: BWN
- Zone(s): Eastern Railway
- Division(s): Howrah
- Classification: NSG-2

History
- Opened: 1855; 171 years ago
- Electrified: 1958
- Former names: East Indian Railway Company

Passengers
- 44M/Year: 120K/Day (▲ high)

Services
Preceding station	Indian Railways	Following station
Terminus	Eastern Railway zone Bardhaman–Asansol section	Talit towards Asansol Junction
Preceding station	Kolkata Suburban Railway	Following station
Gangpur towards Howrah Junction	Eastern Line Howrah - Barddhaman Main line	Terminus
Gangpur towards Howrah Junction	Eastern Line Howrah - Barddhaman Chord line	Terminus
Terminus	Eastern Line Bardhaman–Katwa line	Kamnara towards Katwa Junction
Route map
Location
- Interactive map of Barddhaman Junction

Barddhaman Junction Railway Station (station code: BWN) is a railway junction station on the Howrah–Delhi main line and is located in Purba Bardhaman District in the Indian state of West Bengal. EMU services from Howrah along Howrah–Bardhaman main line and Howrah–Bardhaman chord terminate at Bardhaman. Every day, over 300 express/mail/SF trains halt here, making it one of the busiest and important junction railway station in Eastern India. It serves Bardhaman, the fifth most populous city in West Bengal.

== History ==
Barddhaman Junction is an important station in the Eastern Railway zone. Trains from Howrah, Sealdah, Kolkata towards Pt. Deen Dayal Upadhyay, Gaya etc. go through the station. The station consists of eight platforms.

The first passenger train ran from Howrah to Bardhaman on 15 August 1855.

The track was extended to Raniganj by 1855.

The Howrah–Bardhaman chord, a shorter link to Bardhaman from Howrah than the Howrah–Bardhaman main line, was constructed in 1917.

Bardhaman–Katwa line was upgraded from NG to BG in 2014 (up to Balgona) and extended up to Katwa in 2018.

== Barddhaman RRI ==
It has Siemens interlocking and it was commissioned in 2014. New route relay interlocking (RRI) has considerably increased train punctuality.

== Electrification ==
Electrification of the Howrah–Bardhaman main line was completed with 25 kV AC overhead system in 1958. Earlier, electrification started (on the Howrah–Bandel sector) with 3 kV DC overhead system in 1953.

The Howrah–Bardhaman chord was electrified in 1964–66. The Bardhaman–Katwa line was electrified in 2014 (up to Balgona) and 2018 (up to Katwa jn).

== Amenities ==
Barddhaman railway station has two-bedded non-AC retiring rooms and four bedded non-AC dormitories. The station platforms are equipped with high speed Wi-Fi access provided by Google and RailWire. All platforms are equipped with escalators (1-8) with a lift facility in platform number 6-7. Automated ticket vending machines are at both sides of the station where tickets can be purchased by cash, card, or UTS mobile system. IRCTC vendors offer various types of food at the station platforms. Purified and cold water is available at platforms.

== Bardhaman Coaching & Wagon Depot ==
Bardhaman Coaching & Wagon Depot can maintain passenger trains EMU and MEMU, including one DEMU rake. It has a capacity of holding 71 coaches.

== Barddhaman Loco Shed ==
The shed was commissioned in September 1983. Even though it is named as Diesel loco shed, Barddhaman, it only holds electric locomotives now.

Serial No.	Locomotive Class	Horsepower	Quantity
1.	WAG-5	3850	25
2.	WAG-7	5350	49
Total Locomotives Active as of February 2026			74

== Incidents ==
On two different dates, 6 and 13 April 2003, employees of a private security agency fired at fleeing coal thieves, injuring a passerby and on the later date, a hawker. Following these incidents, a large mob comprising the station's hawkers and residents of the area clashed with police forces, leading to a baton charge and arrests on 14 April 2003.

On Friday, 8 November 2019, around 20 people were injured in a stampede over a footbridge at the station.

On Saturday, 4 January 2020, a major portion of the main entrance gate of the railway station collapsed, one died and several people injured. Construction activities were taking place at the site of the accident.

On 7 June 2020, A portion of the balcony at the entrance to platform number one collapsed, injuring one passenger.

On 13 December 2023, a 133 year old water tank on Platform 4 and 5 suddenly collapsed during afternoon. Four people lost their lives. 34 were injured. On the same day, there was a stampede, injuring two people.

On 29 January 2024, the RMS building, located next to the main entrance of the station, collapsed. However, no major accident occurred as no one was in the office at the time of the accident.

On Sunday,12 October 2025 at 17:18, several people got injured in a stampede over foot over bridge near platform no 4&5. Report says that around 10–12 people were injured and one died in the chaos that followed when a woman reportedly lost her balance on the crowded bridge due to delay announcement of trains.

== Gallery ==
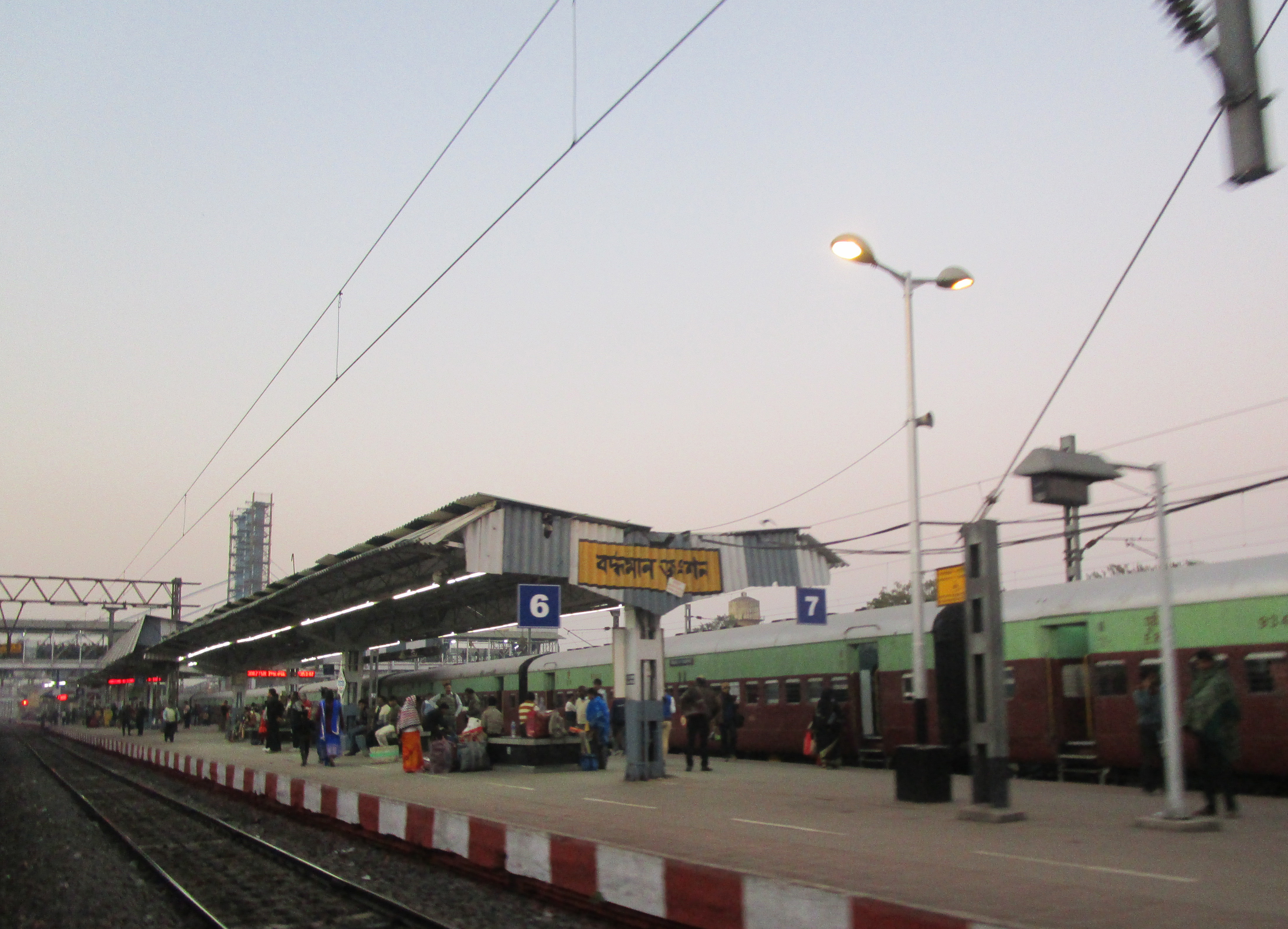
Barddhaman railway station platform

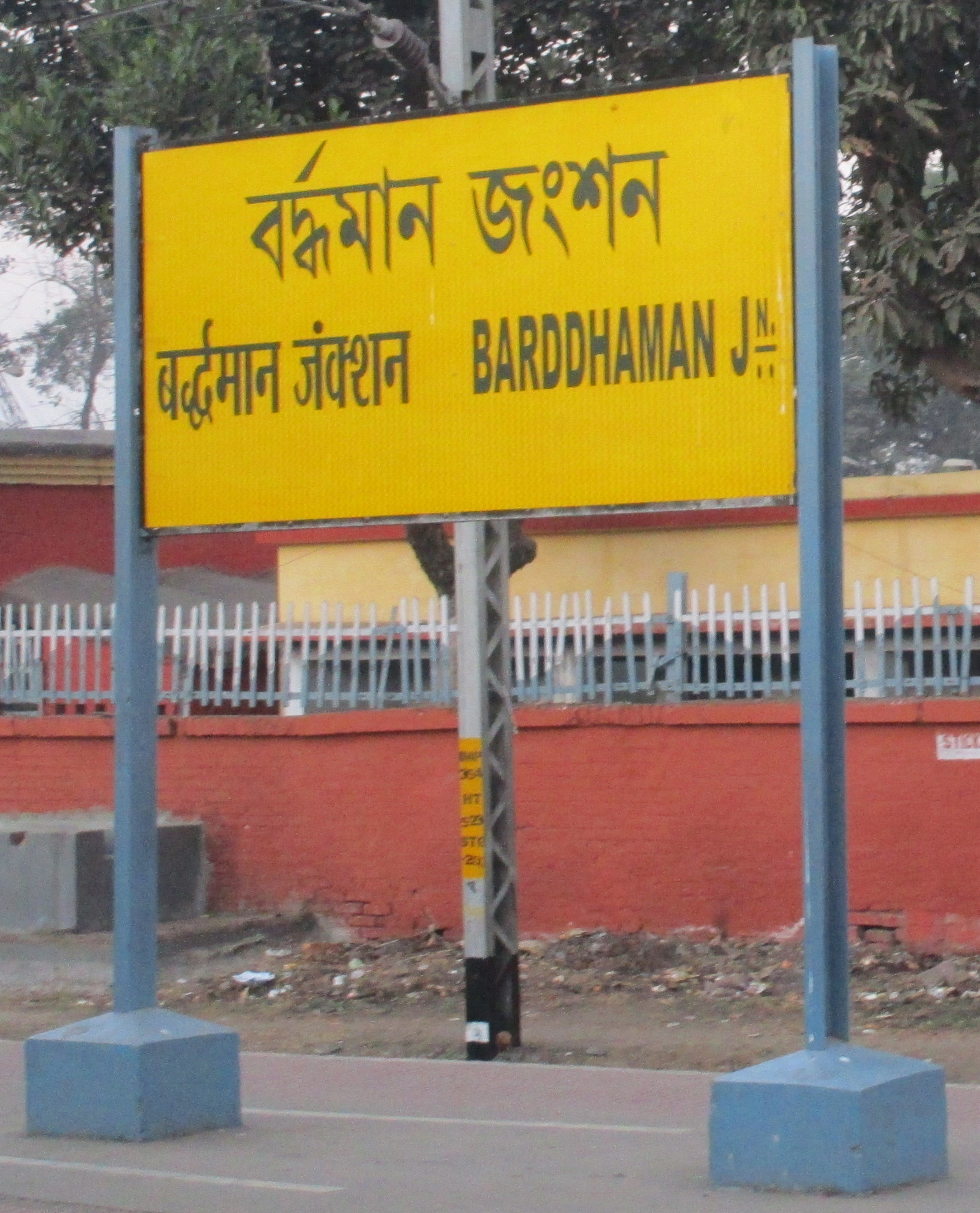
Barddhaman Junction railway station nameplate

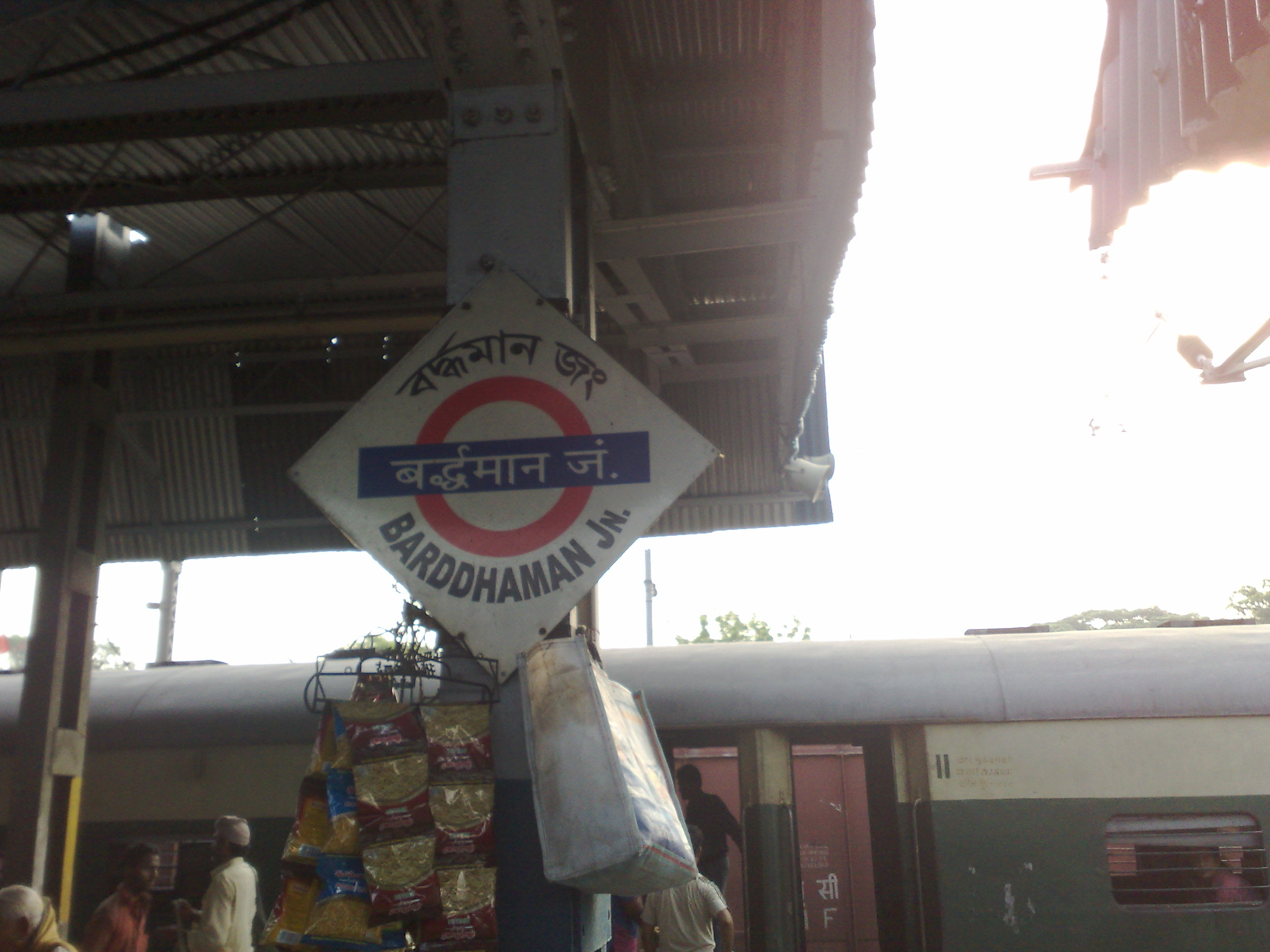
Bardhaman Junction
