= Bardhaman–Katwa line =

Railway line in India

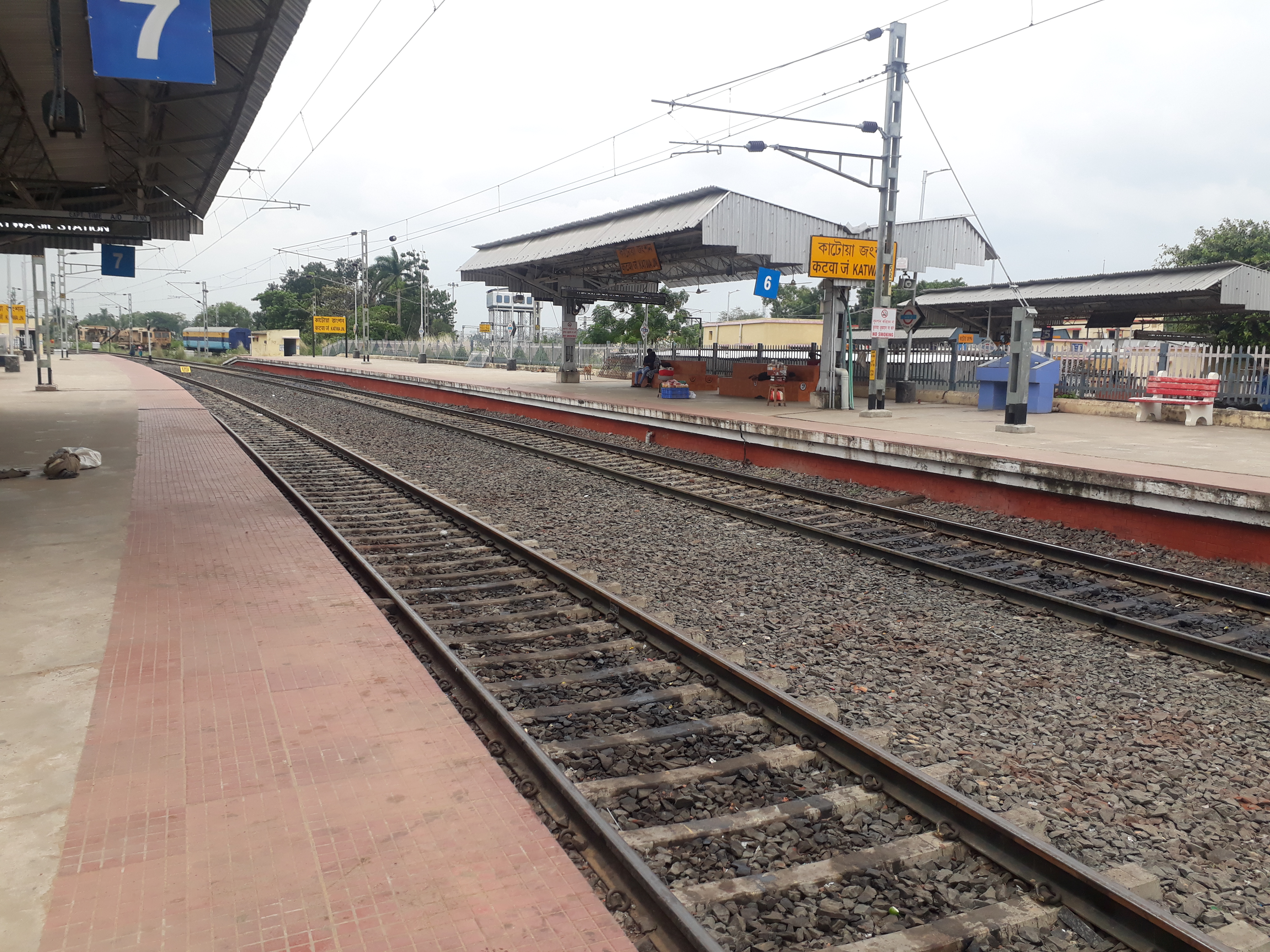
- Katwa Junction is one of the termini of the Bardhaman–Katwa line

Overview
- Status: Operational
- Owner: Indian Railways
- Locale: West Bengal
- Termini: Bardhaman; Katwa
- Stations: 16

Service
- System: Electrified
- Operator(s): 1915-1966 McLeod's Light Railways; 1966-present Eastern Railway

History
- Opened: 1 December 1915 (NG), 11 February 2014 (BG) (Bardhaman - Balgona Section), 12 January 2018 (BG) (Balgona - Katwa Section)
- Closed: 15 April 2010 (Bardhaman - Balgona section); 1 December 2014 (Balgona - Katwa section)

Technical
- Line length: 53 km (33 mi)
- Track gauge: 5 ft 6 in (1,676 mm) broad gauge
- Old gauge: 2 ft 6 in (762 mm)
- Electrification: 25 kV AC overhead since 11 February 2014 (Bardhaman - Balgona section); since 12 January 2018 (Balgona - Katwa Section)

The Bardhaman–Katwa line is a 5 ft 6 in (1,676 mm) broad gauge branch line connecting Bardhaman and Katwa in Purba Bardhaman district of West Bengal. It is under the jurisdiction of Eastern Railway. The line was a narrow gauge line, before its gauge conversion began on 2010. The gauge conversion was done in two phases along with electrification and the full broad gauge line was open to the public again on 12 January 2018.

== History ==
=== McLeod's Light Railways ===
McLeod's Light Railways (MLR) consisted of four 2 ft 6 in (762 mm) narrow gauge lines in West Bengal in India. The railways were built and owned by McLeod & Company, which was the subsidiary of a London company of managing agents, McLeod Russell & Co. Ltd.

Burdwan-Katwa Railway connecting Bardhaman (earlier known as Burdwan) and Katwa in now Purba Bardhaman district, West Bengal was opened to traffic on 1 December 1915. The railway was built in 2 ft 6 in (762 mm) gauge and total length was 53 kilometres (33 mi).

The railway had a maximum speed of 30 kilometres per hour (19 mph).

=== Gauge Conversion ===
The 53 km long railway section was converted to 5 ft 6 in (1,676 mm) broad gauge, work for which began on 15 April 2010.

The Bardhaman-Balogna section of the line, after conversion from narrow gauge to electrified broad gauge, was opened to the public on 11 February 2014. The Balogna-Katwa section of the line, after conversion from narrow gauge to electrified broad gauge, was opened to the public on 12 January 2018.
