= Karui =

- Village
- Location within West Bengal
- Coordinates: 23°31′16.3″N 88°05′36.3″E
- Country: India
- State: West Bengal
- District: Purba Bardhaman
- Subdivision: Katwa
- CD Block: Katwa II
- Established: 1865

Government
  - Type: Gram panchayat
  - Gram Pradhan: Kalyan Bharati
  - Upa Pradhan: Ekkari Santra

Area
  - Total: 15.30 km^{2} (5.91 sq mi)
- Elevation: 19 m (62 ft)

Population (2011)
  - Total: 10,506
  - Density: 686.7/km^{2} (1,778/sq mi)

Languages
  - Official: Bengali, English
- Time zone: UTC+5:30 (IST)
- PIN: 713143
- Telephone code: +91-3453
- Vehicle registration: WB42
- Lok Sabha constituency: Bardhaman Purba
- Vidhan Sabha constituency: Katwa
- Website: purbabardhaman.gov.in/..

Karui is a village in Katwa II CD block in Katwa subdivision of Purba Bardhaman district of West Bengal state in East India. The meaning of Karui is Grain Storage.

== Location ==
The region has an average elevation of 19 metres (65 ft). The village is situated 15 km from Katwa, 52 km from Bardhaman and less than 130 km from Kolkata on road. Karui has a total area of 15.30 km^{2}. It is under Katwa II CD Block which is a part of the Bhagirathi basin. The region has many swamps and water-logged areas. The soil is fertile, as it consists mainly of silt deposits.

=== Urbanisation ===
88.44% of the population of Katwa subdivision live in the rural areas. Only 11.56% of the population live in the urban areas. The map alongside presents some of the notable locations in the subdivision. All places marked in the map are linked in the larger full screen map.

== Demographics ==
=== Population ===
In the 2011 census, Karui had a population (including institutional and houseless population) of 10,506, out of which 5,415 (51.54%) were males and 5091 (48.46%) were females. Population between the age group 0–6 years were 1,285, among them 690 were males and 595 were females. Total number of households were 2,363. Scheduled Castes population were 2853 (1461 males and 1392 females) and Scheduled Tribes population were 164 (80 males and 84 females).

=== Literacy ===
According to 2011 census, effective literacy rate for the 6+ population was 61.20%, which was lower than the district's literacy rate (74.73%) . Male literacy rate was 65.82% and female literacy rate 56.23%.

=== Language & Religion ===
Bengali is the local language in this area. Main religions are Hinduism and Islam.

== Administration ==
Karui is under Karui Gram Panchayat, which belongs to Katwa II CD Block. Katwa police station has jurisdiction over Karui.

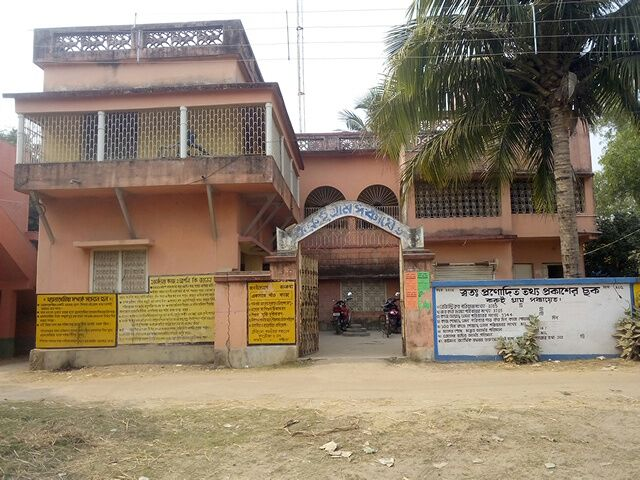
Karui Gram Panchayat Office

== Culture ==
The dominant culture of Karui is identical to that of most of West Bengal and is deeply influenced by Hindu Bengali culture. Some of the popular festivals in Karui include:

- Gajon Utsav (Bengali: গাজন উৎসব) (mid-April)
- Durga Puja (September/October)
- Kali Puja (October/November)
- Dol Purnima or Dol Yatra (February/March)
- Saraswati Puja (February/March)
- Eid al-Fitr
- Muharram

== Economy ==
In Karui main source of income is Agriculture. Apart from this there are many occupations i.e. Business, Government Job, Private Job etc.

=== Livelihood ===
In Karui in 2011, total workers were 32.31% (main workers formed 86.56% & marginal workers 13.44%). Amongst the class of total main workers, cultivators formed 24.44%, agricultural labourers 47.55%, household industry workers 0.61% and other workers 27.4%. Amongst the class of total marginal workers, cultivators formed 0.046%, agricultural labourers 72.15%, household industry workers 5.7% and other workers 17.54%.

=== Agriculture ===
In 2011, net cropped area in Karui was 1388 hectares. Total irrigated land area was 1289 hectares out of which 1012 hectares were irrigated by canal water, 115 hectares by tubewells and 161.9 hectares by tanks or ponds. Rice is the main crop of this region. Beside that, wheat, oil seed, sugar cane, potato are produced.

=== Banking ===
There is a branch of Paschim Banga Gramin Bank in Karui. SBI KIOSK Banking facility including Bank Of Baroda are also available here.

== Transport ==
=== Road ===
The Kaichar-Kalna Road runs through the north of the village. Katwa-Karui Road meets with Kalna-Kaichar Road here. Private operators operate buses. Karui is well connected by buses with numerous places all around.

There are Four Bus Stops in Karui

- Karui Main Bus Stop
- Tanti Pukur More
- Jas Para Bus Stop (near Karui Gram Panchayet)
- Shib Pukur More

=== Rickshaws ===
E-rickshaws (Toto) are available for travelling within the village.

== Education ==
Karui has 5 Primary Schools and a Senior Secondary School. There is a Public Library in Karui.

=== Senior Secondary School ===
- Karui High School (HS)

=== Primary schools ===
- Karui Dakshinpara F.P. School
- Karui F.P. School
- Karui Purbapara F.P. School
- Karui Sadharan F.P. School
- Karui Sishu Siksha Kendra

=== Library ===
- Karui Kalidas Roy Smriti Granthagar

== Healthcare ==
There is a "Gramin Sasthya Kendra" opposite Karui Gram Panchayet.

== Eminent Persons ==
Kavishekhar Kalidas Roy (1889–1975) was born in this village. He was a poet of the Tagore era of Bengali literature. His poetry was specially influenced by Vaishnava thoughts. Chhatradhara (The Stream of Students), one of his famous poems, describes a teacher's appreciation of his interaction with students. Beside Bengali he also wrote in Arabic and Persian.
