= Kuara, West Bengal =

Kuara
- Village
- Location within West Bengal Location within India
- Coordinates: 23.4897°N 88.1052°E
- Country: India
- State: West Bengal
- District: Purba Bardhaman
- Subdivision: Katwa
- CD block: Katwa II

Government
  - Type: Gram panchayat

Area
  - Total: 15.30 km^{2} (5.91 sq mi)
- Elevation: 19 m (62 ft)

Population (2011)
  - Total: 10,506
  - Density: 686.7/km^{2} (1,778/sq mi)

Languages
  - Official: Bengali, English
- Time zone: UTC+5:30 (IST)
- PIN: 713143
- Telephone code: +91-3453
- Vehicle registration: WB42
- Lok Sabha constituency: Bardhaman Purba
- Vidhan Sabha constituency: Katwa

Kuara is a village in Katwa II CD block in Katwa subdivision of Purba Bardhaman district in West Bengal, India.

== Geography ==
Kuara is located about 22 km from Katwa.

== Demographics ==
As per the 2011 Census of India Kuara had a total population of 4,885, of which 2,556 (53%) were males and 2,229 (47%) were females. Population below 6 years was 526. The total number of literates in Kuara was 3,129 (72.28% of the population over 6 years).

== Education ==
Three primary schools are situated in Kuara: Dangapara FPA school and Kuara Doltala or Battala FPA School and kuara danga FPA school.

== Festivals ==
The most famous festival in this village is "Baba Dharmaraj Puja". Holi is another festival of Kuara(The gods Krishna and Radha are said to have come to Battala) And Eid also.

== Famous places ==
- Thakur Pukur
- Natun Pukur Par
- Dastir par canal pul
- Kuara Hattala
- Kuara Dastir Par
- Kuara Battala
- Dharmaraj Bari Mandir
- Kalitala
- Khori nodi(River)
- Narchi Bridge
- Pakratala(siting chair)
