= Vaishnava Carana dasa Babaji =

Vaishnava ascetic

Vaishnava Carana dasa Babaji (IAST: Vaiṣṇava Carana dāsa) was a Gaudiya Vaishnava guru. A Vaidya by caste, his birth name was Gokulananda Sen. His sripata (temple seat) was located at Tena Vaidyapura, about six miles from Jhamatpur in modern-day Katwa. He compiled the Padakalpataru in AD 1718–1723. He also wrote the preface for the Mahā-vandanā.

He was the disciple of Radhamohana Thakura, a descendant of Srinivasa Acarya. His own disciples included Krishna das Babaji. He was an accomplished musician and popularized the tradition known as Tenar chap or dhap.

He was the friend of a Vaishnava poet named Uddhava dasa (Krsnakanta Majumdar).

Vaishnava Carana dasa was present at the debate held in Bengal in 1708 AD (1115) wherein the superiority of svakiya or parakiya (Krishna's love with his wives in Dvārakā and the unmarried gopis in Vrindavan, respectively) was discussed.
