= Jajigram =

- Village
- Location in West Bengal, India Jajigram (India)
- Coordinates: 23.6301°N 88.1036°E
- Country: India
- State: West Bengal
- District: Purba Bardhaman

Population (2011)
  - Total: 4,471

Languages
  - Official: Bengali, English
- Time zone: UTC+5:30 (IST)
- Lok Sabha constituency: Bardhaman Purba
- Vidhan Sabha constituency: Katwa
- Website: purbabardhaman.gov.in

Jajigram (also referred to as Sripat Jajigram) is a village in Katwa I CD block in Katwa subdivision of Purba Bardhaman district in the Indian state of West Bengal.

== Geography ==
Cities and towns in the Katwa subdivision of Purba Bardhaman district
M: municipal city/ town, CT: census town, R: rural/ urban centre, H: historical place/ religious and/ or cultural centre, C: craft centre.
Owing to space constraints in the small map, the actual locations in a larger map may vary slightly

=== Location ===
Jajigram is located at 23.6301°N 88.1036°E.

=== Urbanisation ===
88.44% of the population of Katwa subdivision live in the rural areas. Only 11.56% of the population live in the urban areas. The map alongside presents some of the notable locations in the subdivision. All places marked in the map are linked in the larger full screen map.

== Demographics ==
As per the 2011 Census of India, Jajigram had a total population of 4,471 of which 2,287 (51%) were males and 2,184 (49%) were females. Population below 6 years was 593. The total number of literates in Jajigram was 2,601 (67.07% of the population over 6 years).

== Transport ==
Jajigram is at the junction of State Highway 14 and State Highway 6.

== Education ==
Bengal Institute of Technology, Katwa is a polytechnic college at Jajigram.

== Culture ==
Srinivasa Acarya is believed to have lived at Jajigram and his relics can still be seen at Sadhanpith.
