= Krishna Ghosh =

Indian politician (born 1979)

Krishna Ghosh (born 1979) is an Indian politician from West Bengal. He is a member of West Bengal Legislative Assembly from the Katwa Assembly constituency in Purba Bardhaman district representing the Bharatiya Janata Party.

== Early life ==
Ghosh is from Katwa, Purba Bardhaman district, West Bengal. He is the son of Tulsi Ghosh. He studied till Class 8 at Agradwip Subodh Chowdhury Siksha Niketan and passed the examinations in 1992. He runs his own business. He declared assets worth Rs. 26 lakhs in his affidavit to the Election Commission of India.

== Career ==
Ghosh won the Katwa Assembly constituency in Paschim Bardhaman district representing the Bharatiya Janata Party in the 2026 West Bengal Legislative Assembly election. He polled 1,22,020 votes defeating his nearest rival, Rabindranath Chatterjee of the All India Trinamool Congress, by a margin of 35,066 votes.
