= Khaepa Kali Tala =

Khaepa Kali Tala is a temple situated at Katwa, Malo Pada near the Gouranga Baddi. Mostly a temple of Hindu Goddess Kali, this temple also comprises a number of other temples, including that of Shiva, the most important deity of Hinduism. Although this temple was set up in the 1970s but the Khaepa Kali was established there by the dacoits long ago.

== Major locations ==
The temple is composed of:

- The temple of Lord Shiva
- The temple of Bhisnu
- The principle temple of Maa Kaali
- The Durga Mandir
- The Hari Mancha
