= Katwa I =

- Community Development Block
- Location in West Bengal
- Coordinates: 23°35′46″N 88°05′02″E
- Country: India
- State: West Bengal
- District: Purba Bardhaman
- Parliamentary constituency: Bardhaman Purba, Bolpur
- Assembly constituency: Katwa, Ketugram, Mongalkot

Area
  - Total: 65.23 sq mi (168.94 km^{2})
- Elevation: 62 ft (19 m)

Population (2011)
  - Total: 173,087
  - Density: 2,653.6/sq mi (1,024.5/km^{2})
- Time zone: UTC+5.30 (IST)
- PIN: 713130 (Katwa); 713502 (Dainhat)
- Telephone/STD code: 03453
- Vehicle registration: WB-37,WB-38,WB-41,WB-42,WB-44
- Literacy Rate: 70.36 per cent
- Website: http://purbabardhaman.gov.in/

Katwa I is a community development block that forms an administrative division in Katwa subdivision of Purba Bardhaman district in the Indian state of West Bengal.

== Geography ==
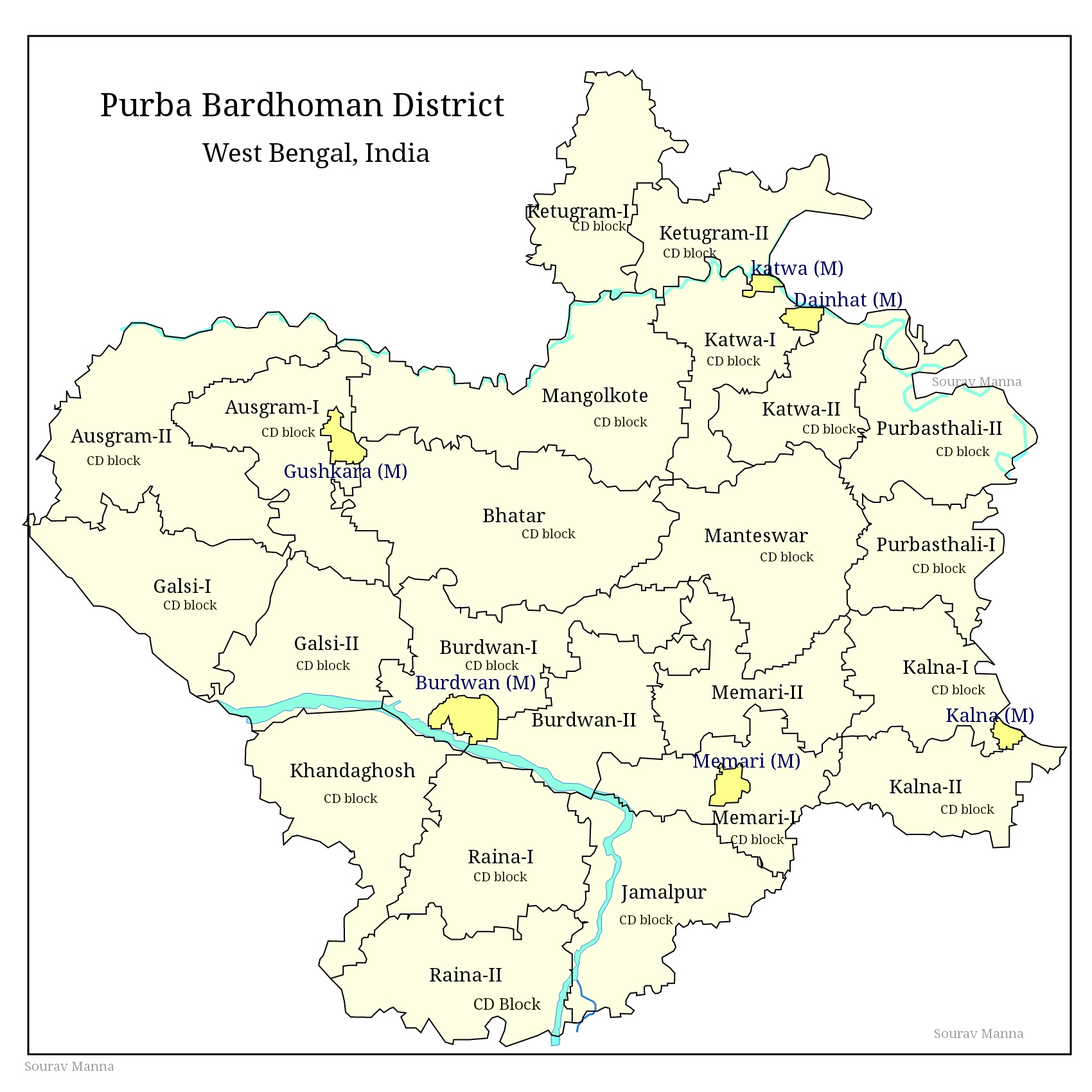
CD blocks of Purba Bardhaman district

=== Location ===
Srikhanda, a constituent gram panchayat of Katwa I block, is located at 23°35′46″N 88°05′02″E.

Katwa I CD Block is part of the Bhagirathi basin. The Ajay forms the northern boundary of the CD Block before joining the Bhagirathi, which forms the eastern boundary of the CD Block. The region has many swamps and water-logged areas. The soil is fertile, as it consists mainly of silt deposits.

Katwa I CD Block is bounded by Ketugram II CD Block on the north, Kaliganj CD Block, in Nadia district across the Bhagirathi, on a part of the east, Katwa II CD Block on a part of the east and the south, Manteswar also on the south and Mongalkote CD Block on the west.

Katwa I CD Block has an area of 168.94 km^{2}. It has 1 panchayat samity, 9 gram panchayats, 129 gram sansads (village councils), 66 mouzas and 63 inhabited villages. Katwa police station serves this block. Headquarters of this CD Block is at Katwa.

Gram panchayats of Katwa I block/panchayat samiti are:Alampur, Gidhagram, Goai, Karajgram, Khajurdihi, Koshigram, Saragram, Srikhanda and Sudpur.

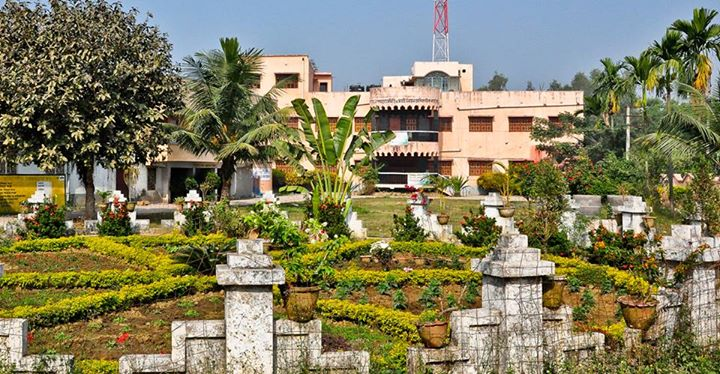
Office of the BDO, Katwa-1 Dev. Block

== Demographics ==
=== Population ===
As per the 2011 Census of India Katwa I CD Block had a total population of 173,087, of which 166,614 were rural and 6,473 were urban. There were 89,087 (51%) males and 84,000 (49%) females. Population below 6 years was 20,011. Scheduled Castes numbered 54,731 (31.62%) and Scheduled Tribes numbered 1,025 (0.62%).

As per 2001 census, Katwa I block had a total population of 152,066, out of which 78,638 were males and 73,428 were females. Katwa I block registered a population growth of 16.27 per cent during the 1991-2001 decade. Decadal growth for Bardhaman district was 14.36 per cent. Decadal growth in West Bengal was 17.84 per cent. Scheduled castes at 48,852 formed around one-third the population. Scheduled tribes numbered 1,676.

Census Town in Katwa I CD Block is (2011 census figure in brackets): Panuhat (6,473)

Large villages (with 4,000+ population) in Katwa I CD Block are (2011 census figures in brackets): Churpuni (6,256), Srikhanda (18,394), Jajigram (4,471), Khajurdih (11,580), Sudpur (7,328), Karajgram (8,800), Bandmura (8,074), Ganfulia (5,150), Gusumba (5,276), Kaithan (7,101) and Gidhgram (4,781).

Other villages in Katwa I CD Block included (2011census figures in brackets): Goai (1,451), Alampur (2,774) and Kashigram (3,814).

=== Literacy ===
As per the 2011 census the total number of literates in Katwa I CD Block was 107,698 (70.36% of the population over 6 years) out of which males numbered 59,506 (75.41% of the male population over 6 years) and females numbered 48,192 (64.98% of the female population over 6 years). The gender disparity (the difference between female and male literacy rates) was 10.42%.

per 2001 census, Katwa I block had a total literacy of 61.56 per cent for the 6+ age group. While male literacy was 69.84 per cent female literacy was 52.66 per cent. Bardhaman district had a total literacy of 70.18 per cent, male literacy being 78.63 per cent and female literacy being 60.95 per cent.

See also – List of West Bengal districts ranked by literacy rate

Literacy in CD blocks of
Bardhaman district
Bardhaman Sadar North subdivision
Ausgram I – 69.39%
Ausgram II – 68.00%
Bhatar – 71.56%
Burdwan I – 76.07%
Burdwan II – 74.12%
Galsi II – 70.05%
Bardhaman Sadar South subdivision
Khandaghosh – 77.28%
Raina I – 80.20%
Raina II – 81.48%
Jamalpur – 74.08%
Memari I – 74.10%
Memari II – 74.59%
Kalna subdivision
Kalna I – 75.81%
Kalna II – 76.25%
Manteswar – 73.08%
Purbasthali I – 77.59%
Purbasthali II – 70.35%
Katwa subdivision
Katwa I – 70.36%
Katwa II – 69.16%
Ketugram I – 68.00%
Ketugram II – 65.96%
Mongalkote – 67.97%
Durgapur subdivision
Andal – 77.25%
Faridpur Durgapur – 74.14%
Galsi I – 72.81%
Kanksa – 76.34%
Pandabeswar – 73.01%
Asansol subdivision
Barabani – 69.58%
Jamuria – 69.42%
Raniganj – 73.86%
Salanpur – 78.76%
2011 Census: CD Block Wise

Primary Census Abstract Data

=== Languages and religion ===
Religion in Katwa I CD block (2011)
Hinduism	70.33%
Islam	29.41%
Other or not stated	0.26%

In the 2011 census Hindus numbered 121,727 and formed 70.33% of the population in Katwa I CD Block. Muslims numbered 50,909 and formed 29.41% of the population. Christians numbered 228 and formed 0.03% of the population. Others numbered 223 and formed 0.03% of the population.

In Bardhaman district the percentage of Hindu population has been declining from 84.3% in 1961 to 77.9% in 2011 and the percentage of Muslim population has increased from 15.2% in 1961 to 20.7% in 2011.

Languages of Katwa I CD block (2011)
1. Bengali (98.7%)
2. Santali (1.23%)
3. Others (0.09%)

At the time of the 2011 census, 98.68% of the population spoke Bengali and 1.23% Santali as their first language.

== Rural poverty ==
As per poverty estimates obtained from household survey for families living below poverty line in 2005, rural poverty in Katwa I CD Block was 36.16%.

== Economy ==
=== Livelihood ===
In Katwa I CD Block in 2011, amongst the class of total workers, cultivators formed 19.86%, agricultural labourers 39.64%, household industry workers 4.35% and other workers 36.16%.

Katwa I CD Block is part of the area where agriculture dominates the scenario but the secondary and tertiary sectors have shown an increasing trend.

=== Infrastructure ===
There are 63 inhabited villages in Katwa I CD block. All 63 villages (100%) have power supply. All 63 villages (100%) have drinking water supply. 18 villages (28.57%) have post offices. 62 villages (98.41%) have telephones (including landlines, public call offices and mobile phones). 34 villages (53.97%) have a pucca (paved) approach road and 40 villages (63.49%) have transport communication (includes bus service, rail facility and navigable waterways). 12 villages (19.05%) have agricultural credit societies. 9 villages (14.29%) have banks.

In 2013-14, there were 79 fertiliser depots, 10 seed store and 55 fair price shops in the CD Block.

=== Industry ===
The 660 x 2 MW Katwa Super Thermal Power Station is being constructed by NTPC Limited.

=== Agriculture ===
Persons engaged in agriculture
in Katwa I CD Block
1. Bargadars (9.83%)
2. Patta holders (4.27%)
3. Small farmers (6.50%)
4. Marginal farmers (25.5%)
5. Agricultural labourers (53.9%)

Although the Bargadari Act of 1950 recognised the rights of bargadars to a higher share of crops from the land that they tilled, it was not implemented fully. Large tracts, beyond the prescribed limit of land ceiling, remained with the rich landlords. From 1977 onwards major land reforms took place in West Bengal. Land in excess of land ceiling was acquired and distributed amongst the peasants. Following land reforms land ownership pattern has undergone transformation. In 2013-14, persons engaged in agriculture in Katwa I CD Block could be classified as follows: bargadars 9.83%, patta (document) holders 4.27%, small farmers (possessing land between 1 and 2 hectares) 6.50%, marginal farmers (possessing land up to 1 hectare) 25.48% and agricultural labourers 53.92%.

In 2003-04 net cropped area in Katwa I CD Block was 13,617 hectares and the area in which more than one crop was grown was 7,890 hectares.

In 2013-14, Katwa I CD Block produced 4,794 tonnes of Aman paddy, the main winter crop from 1,808 hectares, 36,518 tonnes of Boro paddy (spring crop) from 7,519 hectares, 27 tonnes of wheat from 10 hectare, 26,405 tonnes of potatoes from 834 hectares and 10,136 tonnes of sugar cane from 163 hectares. It also produced pulses and oilseeds.

In Bardhaman district as a whole Aman paddy constituted 64.32% of the total area under paddy cultivation, while the area under Boro and Aus paddy constituted 32.87% and 2.81% respectively. The expansion of Boro paddy cultivation, with higher yield rates, was the result of expansion of irrigation system and intensive cropping. In 2013-14, the total area irrigated in Katwa I CD Block was 7,015.40 hectares, out of which 5,880.71 hectares were irrigated by canal water, 91.72 hectares by river lift irrigation and 1,042.97 hectares by deep tube wells.

=== Banking ===
In 2013-14, Katwa I CD Block had offices of 7 commercial banks and 3 gramin banks.

== Transport ==
Katwa I CD Block has 18 originating/ terminating bus routes.

The Bandel-Katwa branch line meets Barharwa-Azimganj-Katwa loop at Katwa.

The Bardhaman-Katwa line, after conversion from narrow gauge to electrified broad gauge, was opened to the public on 12 January 2018.

The narrow gauge 2 ft 6 in (762 mm) Ahmedpur Katwa Railway, built and operated as part of McLeod's Light Railways, is being converted, by Indian Railways, to 1,676 mm (5 ft 6 in) from 2013.

State Highway 6 (West Bengal) running from Rajnagar (in Birbhum district) to Alampur (in Howrah district) and State Highway 14 (West Bengal) running from Dubrajpur (in Birbhum district) to Betai (in Nadia district) cross in this block.

State Highway 15 (West Bengal) running from Dainhat (in Burdwan district) to Gadiara (in Howrah district) originates in this block.

== Education ==
In 2013-14, Katwa I CD Block had 100 primary schools with 10,017 students, 4 middle schools with 346 students, 12 high school with 7,404 students and 4 higher secondary schools with 4,618 students. Katwa I CD Block had 2 technical/ professional institutions with 592 students, 259 institutions for special and non-formal education with 12,616 students

As per the 2011 census, in Katwa I CD block, amongst the 63 inhabited villages, 3 villages did not have a school, 37 villages had two or more primary schools, 17 villages had at least 1 primary and 1 middle school and 14 villages had at least 1 middle and 1 secondary school.

More than 6,000 schools (in erstwhile Bardhaman district) serve cooked midday meal to more than 900,000 students.

Chandrapur College was established at Chandrapur in 1985.

== Healthcare ==
In 2014, Katwa I CD Block had 1 block primary health centre and 3 primary health centres with total 28 beds and 6 doctors (excluding private bodies). It had 25 family welfare subcentres. 281 patients were treated indoor and 171,514 patients were treated outdoor in the hospitals, health centres and subcentres of the CD Block.

Srikhanda block primary health centre at Srikhanda (with 15 beds) is the main medical facility in Katwa I CD block. Katwa Subdivisional Hospital at Katwa, with 250 beds is located outside the CD block. There are primary health centres at Chandrapur (with 10 beds), Kaithan (with 6 beds) and Sudpur (with 6 beds).

Katwa I CD Block is one of the areas of Bardhaman district which is affected by a low level of arsenic contamination of ground water.
