= Panuhat =

- Census Town
- Location in West Bengal, India Panuhat (India)
- Coordinates: 23.6335°N 88.1324°E
- Country: India
- State: West Bengal
- District: Purba Bardhaman

Area
  - Total: 1.03 km^{2} (0.40 sq mi)

Population (2011)
  - Total: 6,473
  - Density: 6,280/km^{2} (16,300/sq mi)

Languages
  - Official: Bengali, English
- Time zone: UTC+5:30 (IST)
- Vehicle registration: WB
- Website: purbabardhaman.gov.in

Panuhat is a census town in Katwa I CD Block of Katwa subdivision in Purba Bardhaman district in the Indian state of West Bengal.

== Geography ==
Cities and towns in the Katwa subdivision of Purba Bardhaman district
M: municipal city/ town, CT: census town, R: rural/ urban centre, H: historical place/ religious and/ or cultural centre, C: craft centre.
Owing to space constraints in the small map, the actual locations in a larger map may vary slightly

=== Location ===
Panuhat is located at 23.6335°N 88.1324°E.

=== Urbanisation ===
88.44% of the population of Katwa subdivision live in the rural areas. Only 11.56% of the population live in the urban areas. The map alongside presents some of the notable locations in the subdivision. All places marked in the map are linked in the larger full screen map.

== Demographics ==
As per the 2011 Census of India, Panuhat had a total population of 6,473 of which 3,354 (52%) were males and 3,119 (48%) were females. Population below 6 years was 650. The total number of literates in Panuhat was 4,817 (82.72% of the population over 6 years).

As of 2001 India census, Panuhat had a population of 5,665. Males constitute 51% of the population and females 49%. Panuhat has an average literacy rate of 60%, higher than the national average of 59.5%: male literacy is 67%, and female literacy is 54%. In Panuhat, 12% of the population is under 6 years of age.

== Infrastructure ==
As per the District Census Handbook 2011, Panuhat covered an area of 1.03 km^{2}. It had 62 km roads. Amongst the medical facilities, both the nearest nursing home and veterinary hospital were 4 km away. Amongst the educational facilities it had were 5 primary schools, 1 middle school and 1 secondary school. The nearest senior secondary school was at Katwa 2 km away.

== Transport ==
Panuhat is off State Highway 14 (locally called Katwa-Kalna Road). Katwa railway station is nearby.

== Education ==
Panuhat has four primary and one secondary schools.
