= Rabindranath Chatterjee =

Indian politician

Rabindranath Chatterjee (born 3 February 1949) is an Indian politician from West Bengal. He is a six time member of the West Bengal Legislative Assembly from Katwa Assembly constituency in Purba Bardhaman district. He won the 2021 West Bengal Legislative Assembly election representing the All India Trinamool Congress party.

== Early life and education ==
Chatterjee is from Katwa, Purba Bardhaman district, West Bengal. He is the son of late Radhakanta Chatterjee. He completed his Bachelor of Commerce in 1969 at Katwa College which is affiliated with the University of Burdwan.

== Career ==
Chatterjee won from Katwa Assembly constituency representing the All India Trinamool Congress in the 2021 West Bengal Legislative Assembly election. He polled 107,894 votes and defeated his nearest rival, Shyama Majumdar of the Bharatiya Janata Party, by a margin of 9,155 votes. He first became an MLA winning the 1996 West Bengal Legislative Assembly election representing the Indian National Congress. He retained the seat in 2001 and won two more terms on Congress ticket in 2006 and 2011 Assembly elections. In 2011, he defeated Sudipta Bagchi of the Communist Party of India (Marxist).

Later, he shifted to All India Trinamool Congress in May 2015 and won the 2016 West Bengal Legislative Assembly election for the fifth time defeating his nearest rival Shyama Majumdar of the Indian National Congress. He polled 84,549 votes against 81,721 votes to Majumdar. Again, he retained the seat for the Trinamool Congress in the 2021 election to become a six time MLA from Katwa.
