= Srikhanda =

- Village
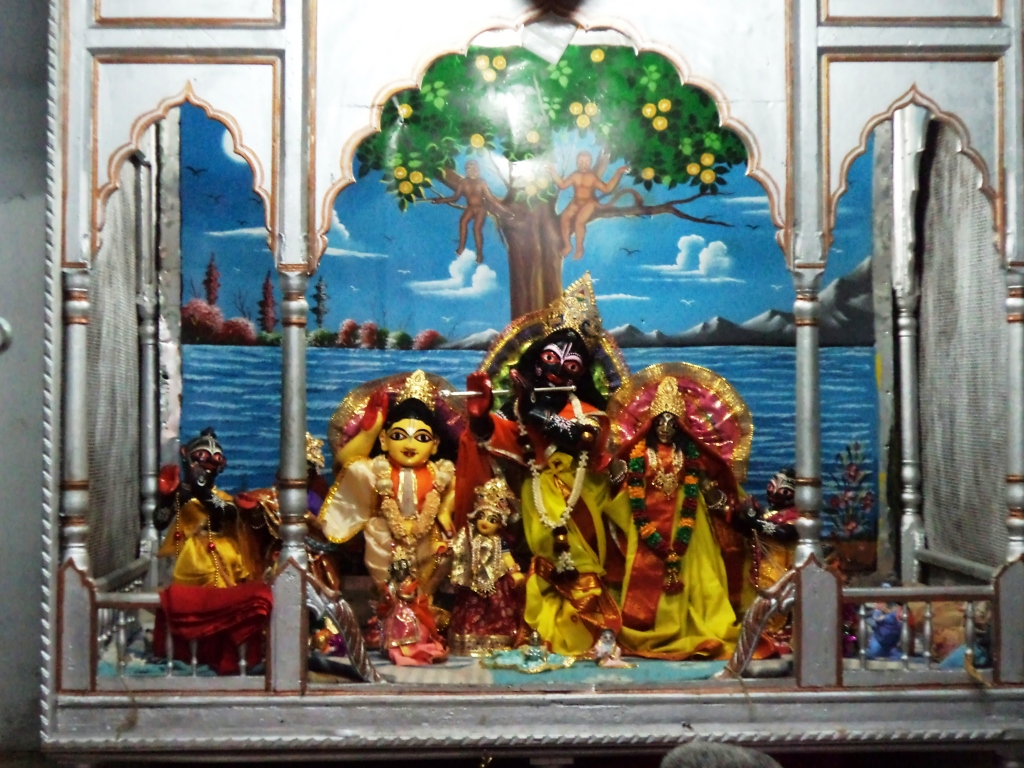
- Jhulan yatra at Srikhanda Uttarabari

- Location in West Bengal, India Srikhanda (India)
- Coordinates: 23.598111°N 88.079889°E
- Country: India
- State: West Bengal
- District: Purba Bardhaman

Population (2011)
  - Total: 18,394

Languages
  - Official: Bengali, English
- Time zone: UTC+5:30 (IST)
- PIN: 713150
- Telephone/STD code: 03453
- Lok Sabha constituency: Bolpur
- Vidhan Sabha constituency: Ketugram
- Website: purbabardhaman.gov.in

Srikhanda is a village in Srikhanda gram panchayat in Katwa I CD block in Katwa subdivision of Purba Bardhaman district. It is about 8 km (5.0 mi) distance from Katwa and 48 km (30 mi) distance from Burdwan.

== Geography ==
Cities and towns in the Katwa subdivision of Purba Bardhaman district
M: municipal city/ town, CT: census town, R: rural/ urban centre, H: historical place/ religious and/ or cultural centre, C: Craft centre.
Owing to space constraints in the small map, the actual locations in a larger map may vary slightly

=== Urbanisation ===
88.44% of the population of Katwa subdivision lives in the rural areas. Only 11.56% of the population lives in the urban areas. The map alongside presents some of the notable locations in the subdivision. All places marked in the map are linked in the larger full screen map.

=== Gram panchayats ===
The villages under Srikhanda gram panchayat are Srikhanda, Debkundu, Nahata, Bagtona, Barnagra, Chandrakota, Kadampukur and Ganguly danga.

In the past Srikhanda Gram Panchayat was under 280 Katwa (Vidhan Sabha constituency) but after Delimitation Commission it is now under 271, Ketugram Vidhansabha constituency and in 41, Bolpur (Lok Sabha constituency) Lok Sabha constituency. The pincode no of Srikhanda is 713150 and std code is (+91) 03453.

== Demographics ==
As per the 2011 Census of India Srikhanda had a total population of 18,394, of which 9,456 (51%) were males and 8,938 (49%) were females. Population below 6 years was 2,517. The total number of literates in Srikhanda was 10,100 (63.61% of the population over 6 years).

== Transport ==
There is a station at Srikhanda on the Bardhaman-Katwa line.

== Education ==
Srikhanda High School, a Bengali-medium boys only school was established in 1908. Apart from this there is a girls only high school and several other primary and pre-primary school providing quality education.

== Culture ==
There are two Shiva temples named Lord Dugddho Kumar Shiv Temple and Shri Shri Bhoothnathjeur Mandir in this village. Prabhu Nityananda hailed from this village. This village is the land of Bengal's Vidyapati Brajabuli language poets Govindas, Chiranjeev, Sulchan.Narahari Sarkar Thakura was born in Srikhanda. The place where Prabhu Narahari used to rest is called Bilas Kunja of Narahari Sarkar or better known as Baradanga where Locana Dasa Thakura the dear disciple of Narahari Sarkar wrote his book Chaitanya Mangala. Srikhanda Thakurbari has temple of Lord Krishna situated in the middle of the village. The villagers of Srikhanda call it 'Khandabasi'.

== Healthcare ==
Srikhanda block primary health centre at Srikhanda (with 15 beds) is the main medical facility in Katwa I CD block. Katwa Subdivisional Hospital at Katwa, with 250 beds is located outside the CD block. There are primary health centres at Chandrapur (with 10 beds), Kaithan (with 6 beds) and Sudpur (with 6 beds). In 2012, the average monthly patients attending Srikhanda BPHC were 2,876 and average monthly admissions were 39. It handled 277 annual emergency admissions.

== Library ==
A Government authorised library named 'Srikhanda Chittaranjan Pathamandir' is located in this village. This library is enriched with over 11,000 books and several rare manuscripts.

See also - Healthcare in West Bengal
