= Chandrapur, Bardhaman =

Chandrapur
- Village
- Location in West Bengal, India Chandrapur (India)
- Coordinates: 23.4641°N 88.0748°E
- Country: India
- State: West Bengal
- District: Purba Bardhaman

Population (2011)
  - Total: 2,104

Languages
  - Official: Bengali, English
- Time zone: UTC+5:30 (IST)
- Telephone/STD code: 03453
- Lok Sabha constituency: Bolpur
- Vidhan Sabha constituency: Manglkot
- Website: purbabardhaman.gov.in

Chandrapur is a village in Katwa I CD block in Katwa subdivision of Purba Bardhaman district in the state of West Bengal, India.

== Geography ==
Cities and towns in the Katwa subdivision of Purba Bardhaman district
M: municipal city/ town, CT: census town, R: rural/ urban centre, H: historical place/ religious and/ or cultural centre, C: Craft centre.
Owing to space constraints in the small map, the actual locations in a larger map may vary slightly

=== Location ===
Chandrapur is located at 23.4641°N 88.0748°E.

=== Urbanisation ===
88.44% of the population of Katwa subdivision live in the rural areas. Only 11.56% of the population live in the urban areas. The map alongside presents some of the notable locations in the subdivision. All places marked in the map are linked in the larger full screen map.

== Demographics ==
As per the 2011 Census of India Chandrapur had a total population of 2,104, of which 1,030 (49%) were males and 1,074 (51%) were females. Population below 6 years was 251. The total number of literates in Chandrapur was 1,124 (60.66% of the population over 6 years).

== Transport ==
Chandrapur is on State Highway 15 running from Dainhat (in Purba Bardhaman district) to Gadiara (in Howrah district). Chandrapur bus stand is at the junction point of SH 15 and Chandrapur-Balgona Road (also known as Dainhat Road) and the village is just off SH 15.

== Education ==
Chandrapur College was established at Chandrapur in 1985. It is affiliated with the University of Burdwan and offers honours courses in Bengali, Sanskrit, English, history, geography, political science, philosophy, and mass communication and journalism. It has a girls’ hostel.

== Healthcare ==
There is a primary health centre at Chandrapur (with 10 beds).
