= Katwa II =

- Community development block
- Location in West Bengal
- Coordinates: 23°29′52″N 88°08′07″E
- Country: India
- State: West Bengal
- District: Purba Bardhaman
- Parliamentary constituency: Bardhaman Purba
- Assembly constituency: Katwa

Area
  - Total: 63.01 sq mi (163.20 km^{2})

Population (2011)
  - Total: 136,708
  - Density: 1,900/sq mi (732/km^{2})
- Time zone: UTC+5.30 (IST)
- PIN: 713502 (Dainhat); 713514 (Singhi)
- Telephone/STD code: 03453
- Vehicle registration: WB-37,WB-38,WB-41,WB-42,WB-44
- Literacy Rate: 69.16″ per cent
- Website: http://purbabardhaman.gov.in/

Katwa II is a community development block that forms an administrative division in Katwa subdivision of Purba Bardhaman district in the Indian state of West Bengal.

== Geography ==
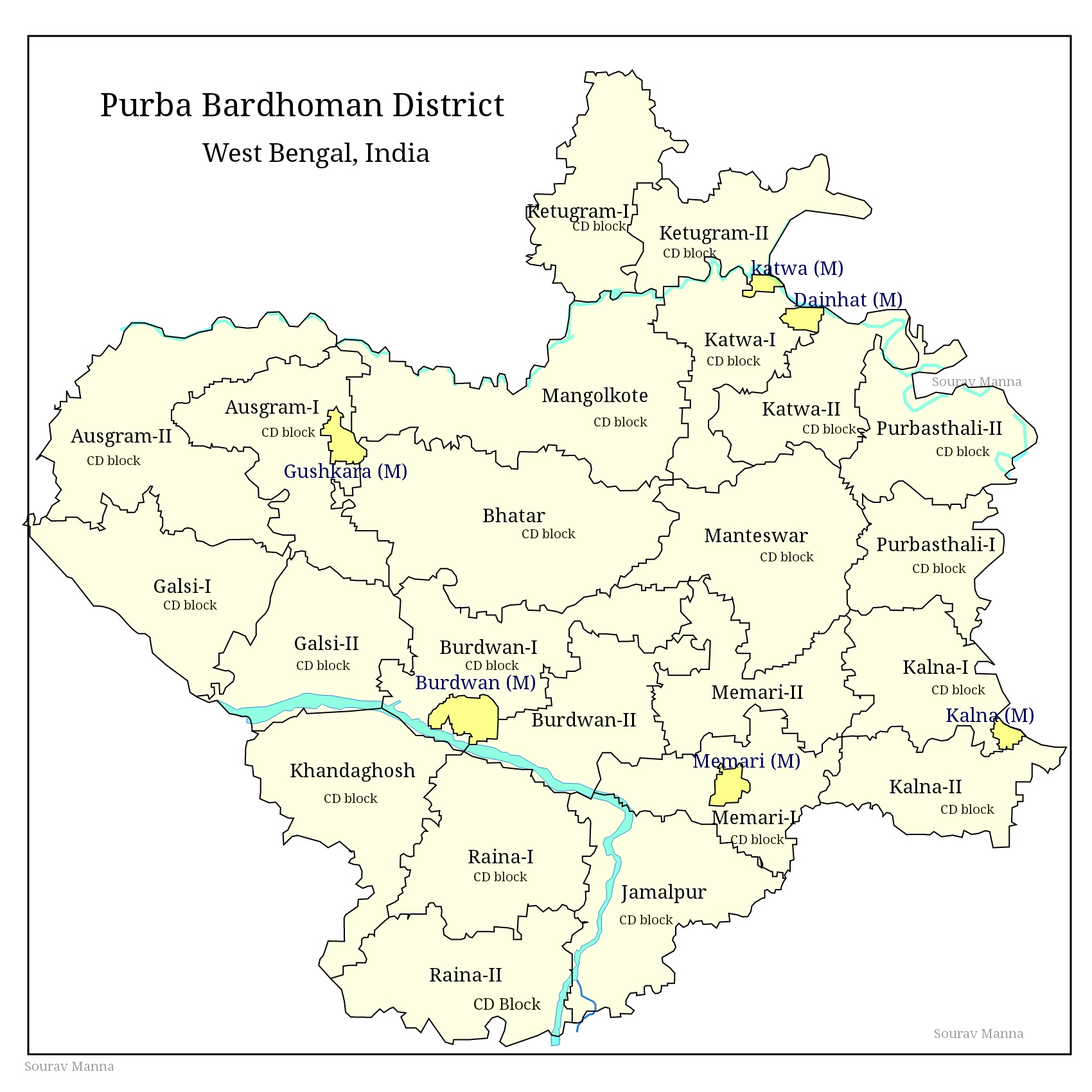
CD blocks of Purba Bardhaman district

Katwa II CD Block is part of the Bhagirathi basin. The Bhagirathi forms the eastern boundary of the CD Block. The region has many swamps and water-logged areas. The soil is fertile, as it consists mainly of silt deposits.

Katwa II CD Block is bounded by Kaliganj CD Block, in Nadia district across the Bhagirathi, on the north, Purbasthali II on the east, Manteswar also on the south and Katwa I CD Block on the west.

Katwa II CD Block has an area of 163.20 km^{2}. It has 1 panchayat samity, 7 gram panchayats, 101 gram sansads (village councils), 68 mouzas and 63 inhabited villages. Katwa police station serves this block. Headquarters of this CD Block is at Dainhat.

Gram panchayats of Katwa II block/panchayat samiti are: Agradwip, Gazipur, Jagadanandapur, Karui, Palsona, Singhee and Sribati.

== Demographics ==
=== Population ===
As per the 2011 Census of India Katwa II CD Block had a total population of 136,708, all of which were rural. There were 70,588 (52%) males and 66,120 (48%) females. Population below 6 years was 15,183. Scheduled Castes numbered 40,303 (29.48%) and Scheduled Tribes numbered 1,963 (1.44%).

As per 2001 census, Katwa II block had a total population of 120,314, out of which 61,696 were males and 58,618 were females. Katwa II block registered a population growth of 13.76 per cent during the 1991-2001 decade. Decadal growth for Bardhaman district was 14.36 per cent. Decadal growth in West Bengal was 17.84 per cent. Scheduled castes at 36,082 formed around one-third the population. Scheduled tribes numbered 1,335.

Large villages (with 4,000+ population) in Katwa II CD Block are (2011 census figures in brackets): Karui (10,506), Kuara (4,855), Palashani (4,761), Agradwip (8,609), Gazipur (6,675), Singi (4,888), Chanduli (4,617) and Multi Krishnanagar (5,408).

Other villages in Katwa II CD Block included (2011census figures in brackets): Sribati (2,656) and Jagadanandapur (1,580).

=== Literacy ===
As per the 2011 census the total number of literates in Katwa II CD Block was 84,047 (69.16% of the population over 6 years) out of which males numbered 46,677 (74.44% of the male population over 6 years) and females numbered 37,370 (63.53% of the female population over 6 years). The gender disparity (the difference between female and male literacy rates) was 10.91%.

As per 2001 census, Katwa II block had a total literacy of 59.34 per cent for the 6+ age group. While male literacy was 67.35 per cent female literacy was 50.83 per cent. Bardhaman district had a total literacy of 70.18 per cent, male literacy being 78.63 per cent and female literacy being 60.95 per cent.

See also – List of West Bengal districts ranked by literacy rate

Literacy in CD blocks of
Bardhaman district
Bardhaman Sadar North subdivision
Ausgram I – 69.39%
Ausgram II – 68.00%
Bhatar – 71.56%
Burdwan I – 76.07%
Burdwan II – 74.12%
Galsi II – 70.05%
Bardhaman Sadar South subdivision
Khandaghosh – 77.28%
Raina I – 80.20%
Raina II – 81.48%
Jamalpur – 74.08%
Memari I – 74.10%
Memari II – 74.59%
Kalna subdivision
Kalna I – 75.81%
Kalna II – 76.25%
Manteswar – 73.08%
Purbasthali I – 77.59%
Purbasthali II – 70.35%
Katwa subdivision
Katwa I – 70.36%
Katwa II – 69.16%
Ketugram I – 68.00%
Ketugram II – 65.96%
Mongalkote – 67.97%
Durgapur subdivision
Andal – 77.25%
Faridpur Durgapur – 74.14%
Galsi I – 72.81%
Kanksa – 76.34%
Pandabeswar – 73.01%
Asansol subdivision
Barabani – 69.58%
Jamuria – 69.42%
Raniganj – 73.86%
Salanpur – 78.76%
2011 Census: CD Block Wise

Primary Census Abstract Data

=== Languages and religion ===
Religion in Katwa II CD block (2011)
Hinduism	75.42%
Islam	24.45%
Other or not stated	0.13%

In the 2011 census Hindus numbered 103,099 and formed 75.42% of the population in Katwa II CD Block. Muslims numbered 33,430 and formed 24.45% of the population. Christians numbered 96 and formed 0.07% of the population. Others numbered 83 and formed 0.06% of the population.

In Bardhaman district the percentage of Hindu population has been declining from 84.3% in 1961 to 77.9% in 2011 and the percentage of Muslim population has increased from 15.2% in 1961 to 20.7% in 2011.

Languages of Katwa II CD block (2011)
1. Bengali (98.2%)
2. Hindi (0.90%)
3. Others (0.90%)

At the time of the 2011 census, 98.21% of the population spoke Bengali and 0.90% Hindi as their first language.

== Rural poverty ==
As per poverty estimates obtained from household survey for families living below poverty line in 2005, rural poverty in Katwa II CD Block was 28.14%.

== Economy ==
=== Livelihood ===
In Katwa II CD Block in 2011, amongst the class of total workers, cultivators formed 23.33%, agricultural labourers 42.60%, household industry workers 5.58% and other workers 28.49%.

Katwa II CD Block is part of the area where agriculture dominates the scenario but the secondary and tertiary sectors have shown an increasing trend.

=== Infrastructure ===
There are 63 inhabited villages in Katwa II CD block. All 63 villages (100%) have power supply. 60 villages (95.24%) have drinking water supply. 20 villages (31.75%) have post offices. All 63 villages (100%) have telephones (including landlines, public call offices and mobile phones). 28 villages (44.44%) have a pucca (paved) approach road and 46 villages (73.02%) have transport communication (includes bus service, rail facility and navigable waterways). 10 villages (15.87%) have agricultural credit societies. 5 villages (7.94%) have banks.

In 2013–14, there were 56 fertiliser depots, 4 seed store and 41 fair price shops in the CD Block.

=== Agriculture ===
Persons engaged in agriculture
in Katwa II CD Block
1. Bargadars (7.40%)
2. Patta holders (12.1%)
3. Small farmers (9.73%)
4. Marginal farmers (28.2%)
5. Agricultural labourers (42.5%)

Although the Bargadari Act of 1950 recognised the rights of bargadars to a higher share of crops from the land that they tilled, it was not implemented fully. Large tracts, beyond the prescribed limit of land ceiling, remained with the rich landlords. From 1977 onwards major land reforms took place in West Bengal. Land in excess of land ceiling was acquired and distributed amongst the peasants. Following land reforms land ownership pattern has undergone transformation. In 2013–14, persons engaged in agriculture in Katwa II CD Block could be classified as follows: bargadars 7.40%, patta (document) holders 12.12%, small farmers (possessing land between 1 and 2 hectares) 9.73%, marginal farmers (possessing land up to 1 hectare) 28.21% and agricultural labourers 42.55%.

In 2003-04 net cropped area in Katwa II CD Block was 13,606 hectares and the area in which more than one crop was grown was 6,610 hectares.

In 2013–14, Katwa II CD Block produced 119,573 tonnes of Aman paddy, the main winter crop from 36,605 hectares, 1,505 tonnes of Aman paddy (summer crop) from 535 hectares, 23,477 tonnes of Boro paddy (spring crop) from 5,981 hectares, 151 tonnes of wheat from 60 hectares, 6,891 tonnes of potatoes from 199 hectares and 3,232 tonnes of sugar cane from 50 hectares. It also produced pulses and oilseeds.

In 2013–14, the total area irrigated in Katwa II CD Block was 6,014.41 hectares, out of which 4,786.89 hectares were irrigated by canal water, 249.74 hectares by river lift irrigation and 977.78 hectares by deep tube wells.

=== Banking ===
In 2013–14, Katwa II CD Block had offices of 4 commercial banks and 3 gramin banks.

== Transport ==
Katwa II CD Block has 6 ferry services and 5 originating/ terminating bus routes.

The Bandel-Katwa branch line passes through this CD Block and there is a station at Agradwip.

State Highway 6 (West Bengal) running from Rajnagar (in Birbhum district) to Alampur (in Howrah district) and State Highway 15 (West Bengal) running from Dainhat (in Burdwan district) to Gadiara (in Howrah district) pass through this block.

== Education ==
In 2013–14, Katwa II CD Block had 87 primary schools with 7,571 students, 7 middle schools with 378 students, 12 high school with 6,749 students and 5 higher secondary schools with 6,434 students. Katwa II CD Block had 1 general college with 1,396 and 195 institutions for special and non-formal education with 5,855 students

As per the 2011 census, in Katwa II CD block, amongst the 63 inhabited villages, 4 villages did not have a school, 29 villages had two or more primary schools, 27 villages had at least 1 primary and 1 middle school and 21 villages had at least 1 middle and 1 secondary school.

More than 6,000 schools (in erstwhile Bardhaman district) serve cooked midday meal to more than 900,000 students.

== Healthcare ==
In 2014, Katwa II CD Block had 1 block primary health centre and 2 primary health centres with total 25 beds and 4 doctors (excluding private bodies). It had 20 family welfare subcentres. 2,421 patients were treated indoor and 213,113 patients were treated outdoor in the hospitals, health centres and subcentres of the CD Block.

Noapara block primary health centre at Noapara, PO Dainhat (with 15 beds) is the main medical facility in Katwa II CD block. There are primary health centres at Agradwip (with 10 beds) and Singhi (with 6 beds).

Katwa II CD Block is one of the areas of Bardhaman district which is affected by a low level of arsenic contamination of ground water.
