= Katwa Super Thermal Power Station =

Katwa Super Thermal Power Station কাটোয়া তাপবিদ্যুৎ কেন্দ্র
- Official name: Katwa STPP
- Country: India
- Location: Katwa, Purba Bardhaman district, West Bengal
- Coordinates: 23°36′8″N 88°4′38″E
- Status: Under construction
- Construction cost: 8,000 crore(INR)
- Owner: NTPC

Thermal power station
- Primary fuel: Coal

Power generation
- Units operational: Under Construction
- Nameplate capacity: 1,320 MW

Katwa Super Thermal Power Station is located near Srikhanda Village, 8 km from Katwa town in West Bengal. The power plant is one of the coal based power plants of NTPC. It is under construction.

== Background ==
The proposed Rs 8,000-crore Katwa Thermal Power project was first conceived by WBPDCL but could not be executed due to land acquisition related issues. It was later handed over to the NTPC.

== Power Plant ==
Initially, NTPC had planned for super critical (800 MW × 2) 1600 MW power plant but land scarcity and other factors led to it being scaled down to (660 MW × 2) 1320 MW project.

== Proposed capacity ==
Stage	Unit Number	Proposed Capacity (MW)	Date of Commissioning	Status
First	1	660	NA	Under Construction
First	2	660	NA	Under Construction

== Environmental Impacts ==
In order to identify the environmental impacts due to the construction and operation of Katwa Super Thermal Power Project (2×660 MW) and associated facilities(township, ash disposal area etc.), an EIA study is proposed to be undertaken. The aim of the study is to establish the existing environmental conditions, predict impacts of the power plant, and associated facilities and formulate the Environmental Management Plan (EMP). The EIA report is required for conducting Public Hearing for the project, obtaining Consent to Establish for the project from West Bengal Pollution Control Board and obtaining Environmental Clearance (EC) from Ministry of Environment, Forests and Climate Change.

== Pollution ==
The Katwa Super Thermal Power plant is expected to generate around 27 lakh tonnes of ash annually. The NTPC will have to submit to the Centre a road map for ash disposal for the next 20–30 years to get clearances from the Central Pollution Control Board.
