= Radhamohana Thakura =

Rādhāmohana Thākur (1697–1778) was a Vaishnava guru. He was born in Malihati, Bardhaman and was the great-great-grandson of Srinivasa Acarya. His father was Jagadananda Thakura, and his siblings were Yadavendu, Bhuvanamohana, Gauramohana, Syamasundara, and Madanamohana. Maharaja Nandakumar and Vaishnava Carana dasa Babaji were among Radhamohana's disciples. Others included Nayananda Tarkalankar, Krsnaprasad Thakura, Kalindi and Parana. He was supporter if devdasi pratha holy prostitute of temple.

Rabindranarayana, the King of Puthia, was a Sakta by faith. However, when his court pandita was defeated by Radhamohana in a debate, the King became a Vaisnava. Radhamohana was present during a debate held in 1718 at the court of Nawab Murshid Ouli Khan regarding the theology of Svakiya and Parakiya.

Radhamohana Thakura compiled the Padamrtasamudra, as well a commentary on it. Of the 301 padas in the book, 182 of them have been included in Padakalpataru.

In 1778, after taking a bath and marking his body with tilak, Radhamohana died in a Tulasi grove while chanting the holy names. It is said that at the time of his demise his two favorite disciples, Kalindi dasa and Parana dasa, were returning to Malihati, having completed the renovation of one of the kunjas in Vrndavana. Along the way Radhamohana suddenly appeared before them and instructed them to hold a festival on the fourth day of the dark fortnight in the month of Vaisaka, and then disappeared.

Radhamohana had no children and his wife died seven days after him.
