= Maharaja Nandakumar =

Indian tax collector (c. 1705–1775)

Maharaja Nandakumar (also known as Nuncomar; c. 1705 – died 5 August 1775) was an Indian tax collector for various regions in what is modern-day West Bengal. Nanda Kumar was born at Bhadrapur, which is now in Birbhum. Nandakumar was appointed by the East India Company to be the Dewan (tax collector) for Burdwan, Nadia and Hooghly in 1764, following the removal of Warren Hastings from the post.

In 1773, when Hastings was reinstated as governor-general of Bengal, Nandakumar brought accusations against him of accepting or giving bribes that were entertained by Sir Philip Francis and the other members of the Supreme Council of Bengal. However, Hastings overruled the council's charges. Thereafter, in 1775, he brought charges of document forgery against Nandakumar. The Maharaja was tried under Elijah Impey, India's first Chief Justice, and friend of Warren Hastings, was found guilty, and hanged in Kolkata on 5 August 1775.

== Early life ==
Nandkumar was born in a Bengali Brahmin family of Kulin Brahmin descent during the year 1705, in the village named Bhadrapur that belonged to the then Murshidabad district (which later included in the Birbhum District). He belonged in the 'Kashyap Gotriya' Brahmin family surnamed Ray. His Father's name was Padmanabha Ray. Nandakumar held posts under Nawab of Bengal. After the Battle of Plassey, he was recommended to Robert Clive for appointment as their agent to collect revenues of Burdwan, Nadia and Hooghly. The title "Maharaja" was conferred on Nandakumar by Shah Alam II in 1764. He was appointed Collector of Burdwan, Nadia, and Hugli by the East India Company in 1764, in place of Warren Hastings. He learnt Vaishnavism from Radhamohana Thakura.

== Forgery conviction ==
After 1765 Nandakumar fell out of favour with the British. In 1772 his old enemy Warren Hastings returned to Bengal and reluctantly turned to Nandakumar for evidence to support the dismissal of the deputy nawab Muhammad Reza Khan. This limited cooperation between the two was short-lived, however, and Nandakumar felt slighted by Hastings. Nandakumar saw an opportunity to advance his interests in the conflict between Hastings and the newly appointed British councillors. In order to assist the councillors in removing Hastings, Nandakumar accused the governor-general of accepting presents worth about £40,000 from the nawabs, among other allegations. He alleged as well that Hastings had sold offices and bribed him with more than one-third of a million rupees. Hastings declined to respond to the charges at the time, although years later he admitted that he had accepted over £15,000 in "customary allowances given to the governor visiting the nawab". According to P. J. Marshall, it is likely that Hastings had accepted other "customary emoluments" as well, but the rest of Nandakumar's allegations cannot be proved.

During the proceedings resulting from Nandakumar's allegations, an accusation of forgery going back to 1769 was brought against him. The prosecution against Nandakumar was advanced by his Indian Bengali enemies, who were encouraged by one of Hastings's closest friends, although there is no evidence that they were in direct contact with Hastings himself. The case was presided over by Elijah Impey, the first Chief Justice of Supreme Court in Calcutta, who was an old friend of Hastings since their school years. Nandakumar was sentenced to death under the British statute that made forgery a capital crime. He wrote the following in his last petition: "They put me to death out of Enmity and Partiality to the Gentlemen who have betrayed their Trust". He was hanged at Cooly Bazaar, Calcutta, to the north of present-day Vidyasagar Setu, on 5 August 1775. He was survived by his wife, the Rani Kshemankari, a son, and two daughters.

Nandakumar's execution has frequently been characterised as a case of judicial murder. Elijah Impey later justified his decision to refuse reprieve, stating that this would have undermined the authority of the court because the evidence of wrongdoing was not so obvious. In his own time and since, Hastings has been accused of advancing Nandakumar's prosecution and possibly influencing the verdict. He strongly denied these accusations. According to Marshall, the independence of the judges in the case "seems in retrospect to be beyond question", but the execution of Nandakumar was clearly beneficial for Hastings since it stemmed the tide of accusations against him. In 1788 an unsuccessful attempt was made in the House of Commons to impeach Impey for his decision in Nandakumar's trial.

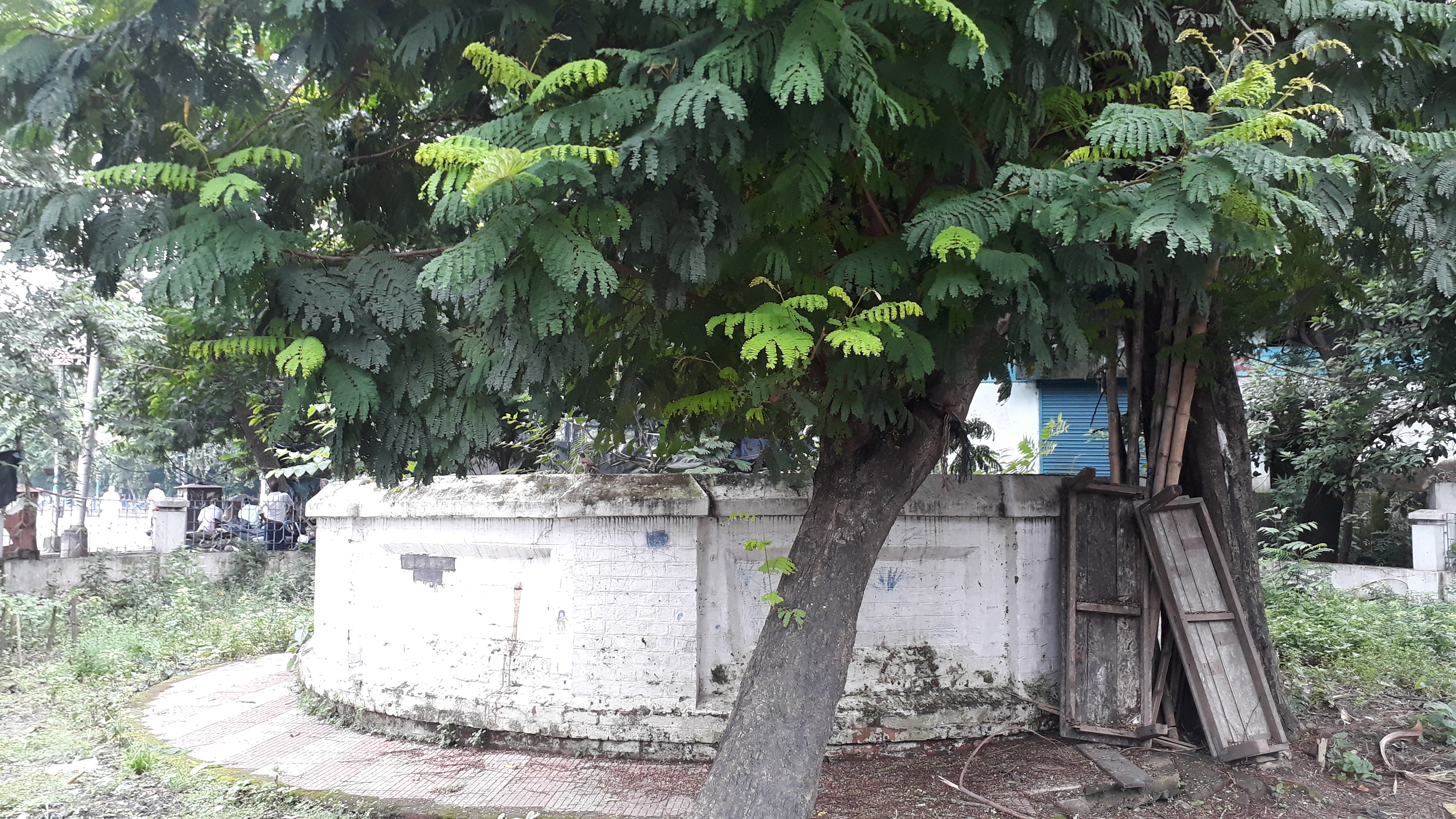
The execution well of Nandakumar in the Hastings neighbourhood of Kolkata

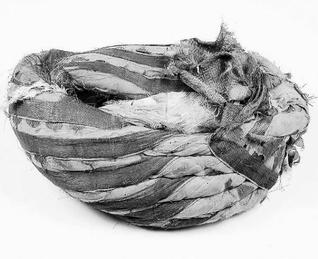
The turban of Nanda Kumar, now kept at the Victoria Memorial Hall in Kolkata

== Legacy ==
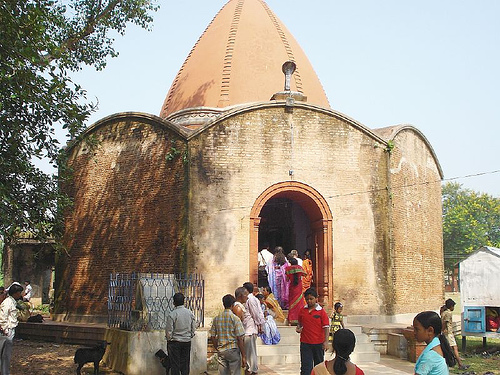
Akalipur Kali Temple (Gujjya Kali)

- A school in his honor, Bhadrapur Maharaja Nanda Kumar High School, was established on his birthplace at Bhadrapur village on Birbhum District.
- A temple was established by him on Akalipur Village near Bhadrapur village. The temple was built for Hindu deity Maa Kaali. This is a very popular temple and thousands of visitors came by. It is situated near the banks of the Brahmani River.
- A college named in his honor, Maharaja Nandakumar Vidyalaya, was established in Purba Medinipur in 2007. The college is affiliated with Vidyasagar University.
- A road in Baranagar, Kolkata is named Maharaja Nandakumar Road.
- Nandakumar is also the name of a locality in the West Bengal district of East Midnapur.
- Nandakumar was established in Tamluk–Digha branch line of Kharagpur railway division.

== In popular culture ==
=== Films and television ===
- In 1988, Doordarshan serial Bharat Ek Khoj produced and directed by Shyam Benegal also picturised a full one episode on the Company Bahadur. In that titular role of Maharaja Nandakumar was played by noted television actor Rajendra Gupta.
