= Kalidas Roy =

- Born: 22 June 1889; Karui village, Barddhaman, Bengal Presidency
- Died: 25 October 1975 (aged 86); Tollygunge, Calcutta, West Bengal, India
- Occupations: Poet, Teacher
- Known for: Poetry

Kalidas Roy (1889–1975) was a poet of the Tagore era of Bengali literature and a teacher. He was born in Karui village of Bardhaman (now Purba Bardhaman district) at West Bengal in a Vaidya (Baidya) family and was from the family lineage of the Vaishnava poet, Lochan Dash. His father was Jogendranarayan Roy. He wrote in both Arabic and Persian. He was the first Head master of Ulipur M.S. High School & College, which one of the oldest school of Bangladesh.He died in the city of Calcutta(Modern day Kolkata).

== Career ==
He earned his first degree from the Krishnanath College, Berhampore, Bengal Presidency, then affiliated with the University of Calcutta. Later he studied for his MA examinations in philosophy from the Scottish Church College.

During his teaching career, Roy taught in various institutions like Barisha High School (South 24 Parganas, near Kolkata) and Mitra Institution, Bhowanipore Branch, Kolkata, where he served as the Assistant Headmaster.

He was one of the poets of the Tagore era of Bengali literature. His poetry was specially influenced by Vaishnava thoughts. He wrote 19 books of verses. His famous poems include Chhatradhara (The Stream of Students), which describes a teacher's appreciation of his interaction with students, and Triratna (The Three Jewels). In addition to poetry, he also translated Sanskrit works and made critical reviews of books.

In Kolkata he lived in a house near Tollygunge, which he christened as "Sandhyar Kulai" (Evening Abode). He died on 25 October 1975.

== Bibliography ==
A few of his books of poetry are:

- Parnaput
- Ritu Mangal
- Kisholoy
- Brojobenu
- Boikali
- Lajanjali
- Ballari
- Aharan
- Aharani
- Khudkunra
- Rashkadombo
- Purnahuti
- Haimanti
- Chittachita

== Awards ==
- Kavishekhar (The Chief/Topmost Poet, 1920), awarded by Bangiya Sahita Parishad, Rangpur
- Jagattarini Swarna Padak (Gold Medal, 1953), from the University of Calcutta
- Sarojini Swarna Padak (Gold Medal), from the University of Calcutta
- Ananda Purashkar (1963) awarded by Anandabazar Group
- Rabindra Purashkar (1968), awarded by for his poetry called "Purnahuti"
- Deshikottam (1970), awarded by the Visva Bharati University
- Hony. D.Litt. (1972) from the Rabindra Bharati University
- Hony. D.Litt. (1976, posthumous) from the University of Burdwan

== See also ==
- Bengali literature
- List of Bengali-language authors (alphabetical)
