= Dainhat =

- Town
- Location in West Bengal, India Dainhat (India)
- Coordinates: 23.6063°N 88.1715°E
- Country: India
- State: West Bengal
- District: Purba Bardhaman

Government
  - Type: Municipality
  - Body: Dainhat Municipality

Area
  - Total: 10.36 km^{2} (4.00 sq mi)

Population (2001)
  - Total: 24,390
  - Density: 2,354/km^{2} (6,097/sq mi)

Languages
  - Official: Bengali, English
- Time zone: UTC+5:30 (IST)
- Website: purbabardhaman.gov.in

Dainhat is a town and a Municipality under Katwa police station of Katwa subdivision, in Purba Bardhaman district in the state of West Bengal, India.

== History ==
A Maratha cavalry or Bargis under Bhaskar Pandit sent to Bengal by Raghoji I Bhonsle in the 18th century entered through Panchet and started looting the countryside. Bhaskar Pandit had decided to build Dainhat as his main camp to attack enemies. He had dug several trenches to protect his camp. A temple created by Bhaskar Pandit still exits near the place Swamaj Bati of Dainhat. Currently that temple is known as Kishore Kishori Mandir.

== Geography ==
Cities and towns in the Katwa subdivision of Purba Bardhaman district
M: municipal city/ town, CT: census town, R: rural/ urban centre, H: historical place/ religious and/ or cultural centre, C: Craft centre.
Owing to space constraints in the small map, the actual locations in a larger map may vary slightly

=== Location ===
Dainhat is located at 23.6063°N 88.1715°E.

=== CD block HQ ===
The headquarters of Katwa II CD block are located at Dainhat.

=== Urbanisation ===
88.44% of the population of Katwa subdivision live in the rural areas. Only 11.56% of the population live in the urban areas. The map alongside presents some of the notable locations in the subdivision. All places marked in the map are linked in the larger full screen map.

== Demographics ==
As per the 2011 Census of India Dainhat had a total population of 24,397, of which 12,487 (51%) were males and 11,910 (49%) were females. Population below 6 years was 2,306. The total number of literates in Dainhat was 18,353 (75.23% of the population over 6 years).

As of 2001 India census, Dainhat had a population of 22,593. Males constitute 51% of the population and females 49%. Dainhat has an average literacy rate of 66%, higher than the national average of 59.5%: male literacy is 72% and, female literacy is 59%. In Dainhat, 12% of the population is under 6 years of age.

== Economy ==
About 32,00,000 people commute daily from around the city to Kolkata. Thirty-eight trains transport commuters from 45 stations in the Howrah-Katwa section.

== Transport ==
Dainhat railway station is 135 km from Howrah on the Bandel-Katwa Branch Line.

State Highway 15 (West Bengal) originates from Dainhat and runs to Gadiara (in Howrah district).

From Burdwan it is 60 km by bus. Dainhat has a ferry facility which connects with Matiyari (in Nadia district) across the Ganges River.

== Education ==
Dainhat has twenty primary, one upper primary, four secondary and three higher secondary schools.one town library (Dainhat Sahar Jitendranath Mitra Smriti Pathagar).

== Healthcare ==
Noapara block primary health centre at Noapara, PO Dainhat (with 15 beds) is the main medical facility in Katwa II CD block. There are primary health centres at Agradwip (with 10 beds) and Singhi (with 6 beds). In 2012, the average monthly patients attending Noapara BPHC were 2,909 and average monthly admissions were 163. It handled 1,772 annual emergency admissions.

See also - Healthcare in West Bengal
