= Srinivasa Acarya =

Vaishnava guru

Śrinivāsa Ācārya Ṭhākura (May 15, c. 1517 – May 9, ?) was a famous Vaishnava guru, the pupil of Jiva Gosvamin and teacher of Yadunandana dasa and Radhavallabha dasa, among others. He converted King Bir Hambir to Vaishnava. His daughter, Hemalata Thakurani, was also a guru.

Srinivas Acharya is a Parsada. He is the abhinna kalevara or identical body of Sri Chaitanya Mahaprabhu. It is believed that Sri Chaitanya carried out his works of spreading the message of Vaishnavaism through Sri Srinivas Acharya. He was invited to come in this world personally by Lord Chaitanya.

There were two expansions of Sri Chaitanya Mahaprabhu: The first expansion are the six Goswamis, who He entrusted to discover Vrindavan, to establish the holy worship of the Lord's deity and to give the bhakti-grantha, the Holy scriptures to protect the bhakti path.

The secondary expansion of His mission came through Srinivas Acharya, Narottam das Thakur and Syamananda prabhu, who were particularly responsible for preaching the message of Sri Chaitanya Mahaprabhu throughout India. They formed the great spiritual sankirtan party. Srinivas Acharya was in the forefront of the Vaishnava movement and was responsible for the propagation of Krishna Bhakti marg across the plains of India.

== The story of the appearance of Srinivas Acharya ==
His father was called Chaitanya Das. Previously he had another name, but when he went to Katwa, Chaitanya Mahaprabhu was at the verge of taking Sannyasa. As he came there the barber was just applying his razor to cut the hair of Sri Chaitanya Mahaprabhu. That sight was so unbearable for him, that finally when he heard the sannyasa name that was given to Mahaprabhu, he could only utter: "Chaitanya, Chaitanya, Chaitanya". Seeing this the people reasoned: "Let's call him Chaitanya Das, as the only things he says, is 'Chaitanya, Chaitanya'. That will be an appropriate name for him!" In this way he received his new name.

Chaitanya Das was married and on one occasion his wife addressed him: "My dear husband, I had a dream; Lord Chaitanya appeared to me, ordering us to have a child." And Chaitanya Das said: "What? You are even using Lord Chaitanya for having a child? That is not proper." "No", she said: "I promise you, I am not speaking any lie. Mahaprabhu came to me in a dream and he told me that he wanted us to have a child. Chaitanya Das replied: "That is not enough for me. We have to go to Puri and confirm that order, since Mahaprabhu is there. And if He wants us to do this special service there is also a good opportunity He will grant us His darshan." Chaitanya Mahaprabhu after taking Sannyasa went to Puri.

They decided to go and as they were living in the Nabadwip area, Chaitanya Das and his wife started on their pilgrimage to Puri. When they reached Puri, Mahaprabhu was coming down the main road in front of the Jagannath Temple with his sankirtana party. He was surrounded by many sannyasis and followers. As soon as Mahaprabhu noticed them approaching, He made the crowd open up, welcomed them and invited them to come and see Him later. All the sannyasis were surprised: "Who is this grihasta ? Mahaprabhu is giving special attention to him. How is that possible?" They were all curious.

This story is described in Bhakti Ratnakara, by Narahari Chakraborty Thakur. Chaitanya Das and his wife went to the Gambhira and there they met Sri Chaitanya Mahaprabhu. They spoke for a while with Him and finally Mahaprabhu told them: "Chaitanya Das, your wife is right. I want you to have a child and I want you to call that child Srinivas."

It was an announcement by Sri Chaitanya Mahaprabhu inviting a dear devotee of His into a very special family of His personal associates, and practically unheard of in the history of transcendence, a child is announced directly by the Supreme personality of Godhead.

They were very happy hearing this service which Chaitanya Mahaprabhu personally gave to them. It was unique. They remained for a few days in Jagannath Puri, joining the sankirtan of Mahaprabhu and filling their hearts with joy. Then they went back to Nabadwip. Shortly thereafter they had this wonderful child – very auspiciously manifested. What could be more auspicious than his appearance heralded by the Lord Himself?

Srinivas Acharya was born and description is given of the family life of Chaitanya Das. It is said, when Srinivas was only four years old, once he went into the temple-room of their house and he saw his father weeping there. The little boy asked: "Father, why are you crying?" Chaitanya Das replied: " Oh, because I have no love for Radha and Krishna, and no love for Chaitanya Mahaprabhu. I am in such a fallen condition." When the little boy saw his father crying and heard his explanations, he also started crying, grabbing the feet of his father he said: " What can I say? I also have nothing of that what you are talking about."

Finally both of them were sitting in the temple room crying. Hearing that sound, the mother came, wanting to see what was happening in the temple room. Seeing husband and child sobbing in despair, she inquired for the reason. Chaitanya das said: "We have no love for Krishna, we have no love for Radharani." So immediately she also fell on the ground and started crying too. There they were on floor of the temple - crying in wretchedness. When Srinivas was about eight or ten years old, one sannyasi visited.

As it is a custom when a sannyasi comes to a home, he will be very happily received and treated with all honors. The sannyasi delivered Krishna katha and everybody was delighted. Then Chaitanya Das told to him: " My dear Sannyasi, you are a great preacher. Can I do you any favor? Is there anything you need?" The sannyasi said: "No, my dear Chaitanya Das, what I want, I will not tell you." Chaitanya Das said: "What you mean, you will not tell me? You can not say this! I am a grihasta and I have my vows and I will treat the sannyasis properly. Please do not hesitate, if you need something special, tell me!" "No!", said the sannyasi: "I will not tell you. I can not tell you. You will not like that." Hearing this Chaitanya Das became even more eager to serve the sannyasi, insisting: "You must tell me. I will not let you leave here. Anything that you ask, I will give to you." Finally the sannyasi revealed his mind: "All right, yes, I want to take your son, Srinivas with me."

Chaitanya Das immediately fell over and lost consciousness. This is because he knew, after all this introduction, he could not withdraw his promise. It was too much. The gift was given and now it was taken back. Srinivas Acharya was taken away by this Sannyasi and then his transcendental career started. He came to Vrindavan and he became a disciple of Gopal Bhatta Goswami. Gopal Bhatta Goswami became his diksha guru. This was all arranged by Chaitanya Mahaprabhu personally and then even though he became initiated by Gopal Bhatta Goswami, he was sent for spiritual studies to Radha Damodar Mandir, to Srila Jiva Goswami Prabhupada so he could learn the Vhaisnava philosophy there.

Srinivas Acharya Thakur lived in Sripat Jajigram in West Bengal with his two wives, Isvari and Srimati. One day while Srinivas was sitting for japa and meditation on Vraja lila, he entered into deep samadhi. It was not unusual for him to remain so absorbed for hours, but this time night came and went and still his samadhi did not break. Dawn flowed into midday, midday into dusk, but still Srinivas remained sitting on his asana, his mind turned inwards, unaware of the outside world. Srimati and Isvari were distressed to see their husband in this state. When another night came and he still showed no sign of consciousness, Srimati and Isvari called for Srinivasa's dearest disciple, Ramachandra Kaviraj. Ramachandra came and they told him, “Ram! Your Gurudev has been sitting in meditation for two days. He has not eaten anything, and his breathing is very slow. We are afraid he might die!” Ramachandra said, “O my dear mothers! I will find out what’s the matter. Don’t worry, everything will be alright.” Ramachandra sat near his Gurudeva and began to meditate. Soon he became completely immersed in Vraja Lila, and saw himself in his svarupa as “Karuna-manjari.” ...”Karuna manjari” found herself in the midst of a grove of trees and flowering vines, and heard the sounds of Radharani's sakhis laughing with Krishna. Following the sounds of their laughter, she made her way to the bank of Sri Radhakunda. There she saw two or three manjaris standing far away from Radha and Krishna and the sakhis, looking with distress towards the water of the kunda. One of them explained, “Radharani has lost her favorite nose ring during jala-keli! We must get it back. See, your sakhi is searching for it now.” Karuna-manjari saw her guru-rupa-sakhi, Mani Manjari (Srinivas Acharya Thakur) diving again and again into the waters of Radhakunda in search of the missing nose ring. Karuna-manjari dove into the water and joined in the search. Within half an hour, she found Radharani's nose ring and gave it to Mani Manjari. Mani Manjari was overjoyed to find the nosering at last. She gave the nosering to Rupa Manjari, who placed it in the nose of Radharani.

Rupa Manjari said to Mani-manjari, “Radharani is so pleased with your seva, she secretly gave me her chewed tambul for you. Take it.” Mani-manjari took a little of Radharani's prasadi tambul and gave the rest to Karuna-manjari. Now that the nose ring was found, both Srinivasacharya and Ramachandra Kaviraj returned to external consciousness. Meanwhile, a third day had come and gone. Srimati and Isvari were weeping bitterly, when Srinivas and Ramachandra finally came to. Srimati and Isvari immediately made arrangements for their prasada, as Srinivas had not eaten for three days, and bade him take rest. The next morning Srimati and Isvari inquired of Ramachandra Kaviraj, “What happened? How has our husband ended up in such a condition? Please tell us everything!” Ramachandra told Srinivasa's wives the story of Radharani's lost nose ring, and they listened with rapt attention. “So you see, o mothers, that is why Gurudeva remained in meditation for three days — he had to complete his seva for Radharani.” The descendants of Hemalata Thakurani presently reside in Vrindaban district of Uttar Pradesh.They are known by the Brahmin title of Chattaraj. Radhamohana Thakura was his descendant.

== Sources ==
- Chakravarti, Ramakanta (1985). Vaisnavism In Bengal (1486 - 1900). Sanskrit Pustak bhandar.
- Rosen, Steven (1991). The Lives of the Vaishnava Saints: Shrinivas Acharya, Narottam Das Thakur, Shyamananda Pandit. Folk Books. ISBN 978-0-9619763-4-7.
