= Katwa subdivision =

- Subdivision
- Interactive map of Katwa subdivision
- Coordinates: 23.65°N 88.13°E
- Country: India
- State: West Bengal
- District: Purba Bardhaman
- Headquarters: Katwa

Area
  - Total: 1,070.48 km^{2} (413.31 sq mi)

Population
  - Total: 963,022
  - Density: 899.617/km^{2} (2,330.00/sq mi)

Languages
  - Official: Bengali, English
- Time zone: UTC+5:30 (IST)
- ISO 3166 code: ISO 3166-2:IN
- Website: http://bardhaman.gov.in/

Katwa subdivision is an administrative subdivision of the Purba Bardhaman district in the state of West Bengal, India.

== Overview ==
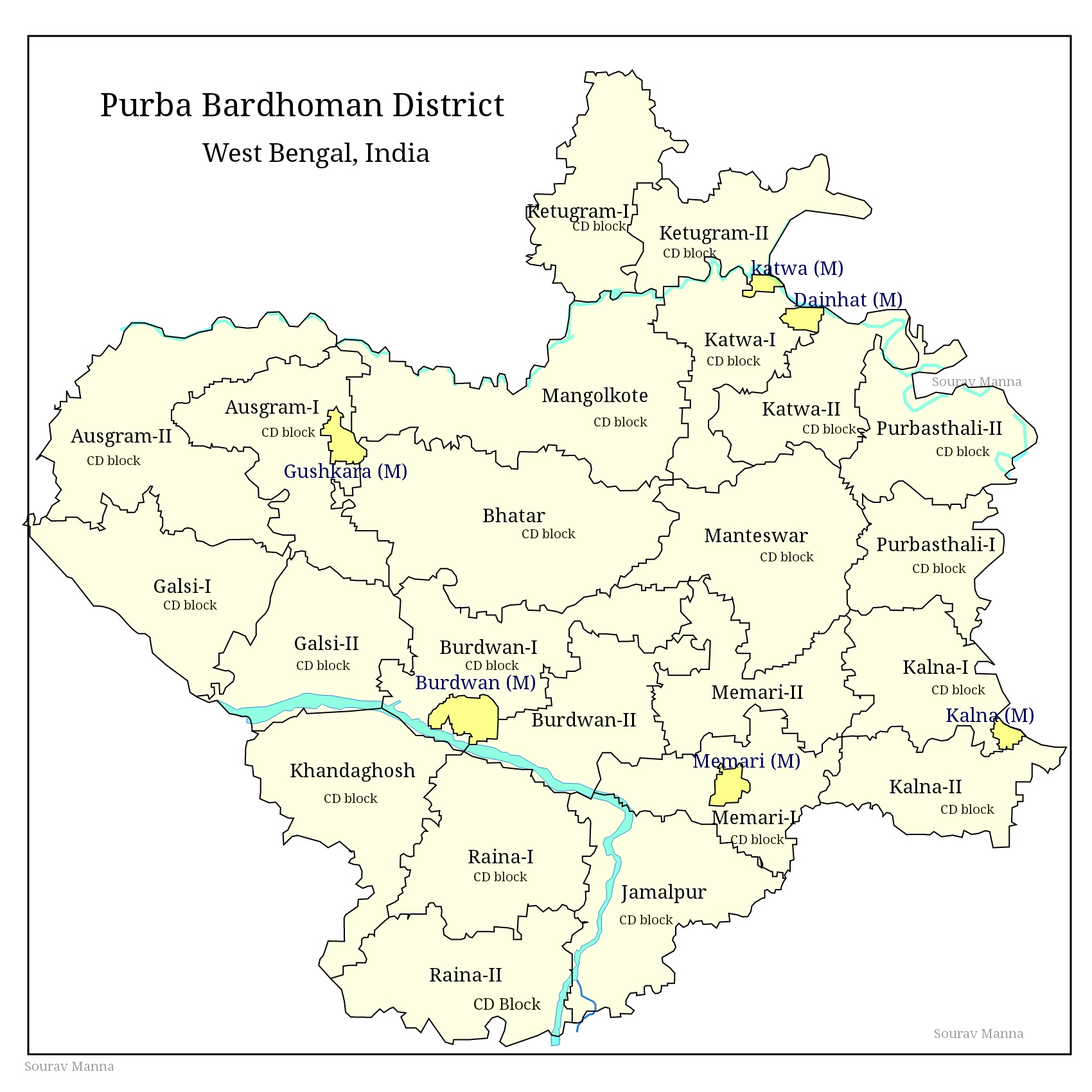
Map of purba bardhaman district

The Katwa subdivision extends from the Kanksa-Ketugram plain to the Bhagirathi basin. The Ajay flows through the subdivision and joins the Bhagirathi.

== Subdivisions ==
Purba Bardhaman district is divided into the following administrative subdivisions:

Subdivision	Headquarters	Area km^{2}	Population (2011)	Rural population % (2011)	Urban population % (2011)
Bardhaman Sadar North	Bardhaman	1,958.43	1,586,623	73.58	26.42
Bardhaman Sadar South	Memari	1,410.03	1,198,155	95.54	4.46
Katwa	Katwa	1,070.48	963,022	88.44	11.56
Kalna	Kalna	993.75	1,087,732	87.00	13.00
Purba Bardhaman district	Bardhaman	5,432.69	4,835,532	84.98	15.02

== Administrative units ==
Cities and towns in the Katwa subdivision of Purba Bardhaman district
M: municipal city/ town, CT: census town, R: rural/ urban centre, H: historical place/ religious and/ or cultural centre, C: craft centre.
Owing to space constraints in the small map, the actual locations in a larger map may vary slightly

Katwa subdivision has 3 police stations, 5 community development blocks, 5 panchayat samitis, 46 gram panchayats, 388 mouzas, 373 inhabited villages, 2 municipalities and 1 census town. The municipalities are at Katwa and Dainhat. The census town is: Panuhat. The subdivision has its headquarters at Katwa.

== Demographics ==
As per the 2011 Census of India data Katwa subdivision, after bifurcation of Bardhaman district in 2017, had a total population of 963,022. There were 494,584 (51%) males and 468,538 (49%) females. Population below 6 years was 109,884.

As per the 2011 census data the total number of literates in Katwa subdivision, after bifurcation of Bardhaman district in 2017, was 598,581 (70.16% of the population over 6 years) out of which males numbered 331,107 (75.50% of the male population over 6 years) and females numbered 269,474 (65.00% of the female population over 6 years).

See also – List of West Bengal districts ranked by literacy rate

Religion in Katwa subdivision
Hindu	69.20%
Muslim	30.57%
Christian	0.10%
Others	0.13%

In the 2011 census Hindus numbered 666,379 and formed 69.20% of the population in Katwa subdivision. Muslims numbered 294,354 and formed 30.57% of the population. Christians numbered 1,001 and formed 0.10% of the population. Others numbered 1,288 and formed 0.13% of the population.

== Police stations ==
Police stations in Katwa subdivision have the following features and jurisdiction:

Police station	Area covered km^{2}	Municipal town	CD Block
Mongalkote	192.15	-	Mongalkote
Ketugram	359	-	Ketugram I, Ketugram II
Katwa	351.03	Katwa and Dainhat municipal areas	Katwa I, Katwa II

== Blocks ==
Community development blocks in Katwa subdivision are:

CD Block	Headquarters	Area km^{2}	Population (2011)	SC %	ST %	Hindus %	Muslims %	Literacy rate %	Census Towns
Mongalkote	Nutanhat	365.44	263,240	31.13	2.83	64.74	34.93	67.97	-
Ketugram I	Kandra	193.98	165,408	25.79	0.62	52.98	46.77	68.00	-
Ketugram II	Gangatikuri	160.03	118,567	36.64	0.58	79.75	20.15	65.96	-
Katwa I	Katwa	168.94	173,087	31.62	0.62	70.33	29.41	70.36	1
Katwa II	Dainhat	163.20	136,708	29.48	1.44	75.42	24.45	69.16	-

== Gram panchayats ==
The subdivision contains 46 gram panchayats under 5 community development blocks:

- Katwa–I block consists of nine gram panchayats, viz. Alampur, Karajgram, Sargram, Gidhagram, Khajurdihi, Srikhanda, Goai, Koshigram and Sudpur.
- Katwa–II block consists of seven gram panchayats, viz. Agradwip, Jagadanandspur, Palsona, Sreebati, Gazipur, Karui and Singi.
- Ketugram–I block consists of eight gram panchayats, viz. Agardanga, Berugram, Murgram–Gopalpur, Pandugram, Ankhona, Jyandas–Kandara, Palita and Rajur.
- Ketugram–II block consists of seven gram panchayats, viz. Billeswar, Ketugram, Nabagram, Sitahati, Gangatikuri, Maugram and Nirol.
- Mongolkote block consists of 15 gram panchayats, viz. Bhalugram, Jhilu–II, Lakhuria, Paligram, Chanak, Kaichar–I, Majigram, Shimulia–I, Gotistha, Kaichar–II, Mongalkote, Shimulia–II, Jhilu–I, Kshirgram and Nigan.

== Economy ==
=== Agriculture ===
In the erstwhile Bardhaman district agriculture was the pre-dominant economic activity and the main source of livelihood for the rural people. The soil and climate favours the production of food grains. Cash crops are also grown. Irrigation facilities had contributed in a major way towards higher agricultural productivity. Amongst the districts of West Bengal, Bardhaman district had maximum irrigated land under cultivation. Given below is an overview of the agricultural production (all data in tonnes) for Bardhaman Sadar North subdivision, other subdivisions and the Purba Bardhaman district, after bifurcation of the erstwhile Bardhaman district, with data for the year 2013-14.

CD Block/ Subdivision	Rice	Wheat	Jute	Pulses	Oil seeds	Potatoes	Sugarcane
Mongalkote	196,760	63	634	18	2,582	10,731	5.052
Ketugram I	70,020	3	-	10	478	2,436	6,952
Ketugram II	56,963	394	4,383	131	2,276	5,465	72,111
Katwa I	41,312	27	-	20	133	26,405	10,136
Katwa II	144,555	151	60,151	38	1,963	6,891	3,232
Katwa subdivision	509,610	638	65,168	217	7,432	51,928	97,483
Kalna	257,149	3,461	179,375	164	11,425	159,659	565
Bardhaman Sadar North	688,626	908	-	108	3,059	105,182	1,802
Bardhaman Sadar South	441,645	1,758	33	1,375	14,619	883,457	1,192
Purba Bardhaman district	1,897,030	6,765	244,576	1,864	36,535	1,200,226	101,042

== Education ==
Given in the table below (data in numbers) is a comprehensive picture of the education scenario in Purba Bardhaman district, after bifurcation of Bardhaman district in 2017, with data for the year 2013-14:

Subdivision	Primary School		Middle School		High School		Higher Secondary School		General College, Univ		Technical / Professional Instt		Non-formal Education	
Subdivision	Institution	Student	Institution	Student	Institution	Student	Institution	Student	Institution	Student	Institution	Student	Institution	Student
Bardhaman Sadar North	947	83,083	42	3,019	122	72,981	92	94,260	8	24,612	38	7,666	2,331	81,318
Bardhaman Sadar South	787	59,920	38	3,138	103	59,680	60	62,371	5	9,521	7	2,069	2,067	64,473
Katwa	601	52,239	21	1,637	74	45,704	42	44,645	3	7,965	8	1,190	1,412	64,979
Kalna	673	54,249	26	1,984	74	55,964	51	65,334	4	9,594	7	663	1,761	67,996
Purba Bardhaman district	3,008	249,491	127	9,778	373	234,329	245	266,610	20	51,692	60	11,588	7,571	277,766

Note: Primary schools include junior basic schools; middle schools, high schools and higher secondary schools include madrasahs; technical schools include junior technical schools, junior government polytechnics, industrial technical institutes, industrial training centres, nursing training institutes etc.; technical and professional colleges include engineering colleges, medical colleges, para-medical institutes, management colleges, teachers training and nursing training colleges, law colleges, art colleges, music colleges etc. Special and non-formal education centres include sishu siksha kendras, madhyamik siksha kendras, centres of Rabindra mukta vidyalaya, recognised Sanskrit tols, institutions for the blind and other handicapped persons, Anganwadi centres, reformatory schools etc.

The following institutions are located in Katwa subdivision:

- Katwa College at Katwa was established in 1948.
- Kandra Radha Kanta Kundu Mahavidyalaya was established at Kandra in 2001.
- Chandrapur College was established at Chandrapur in 1985.
- Mangalkote Government College was established at Mongalkote in 2015.

== Healthcare ==
The table below (all data in numbers) presents an overview of the medical facilities available and patients treated in the hospitals, health centres and sub-centres in 2014 in Purba Bardhaman district, after bifurcation of the erstwhile Bardhaman district in 2017, with data for the year 2013-14.

Subdivision	Health & Family Welfare Deptt, WB				Other State Govt Deptts	Local bodies	Central Govt Deptts / PSUs	NGO / Private Nursing Homes	Total	Total Number of Beds	Total Number of Doctors	Indoor Patients	Outdoor Patients
Subdivision	Hospitals	Rural Hospitals	Block Primary Health Centres	Primary Health Centres	Other State Govt Deptts	Local bodies	Central Govt Deptts / PSUs	NGO / Private Nursing Homes	Total	Total Number of Beds	Total Number of Doctors	Indoor Patients	Outdoor Patients
Bardhaman Sadar North	1	2	5	23	2	-	1	69	103	2,915	554	156,726	2,525,789
Bardhaman Sadar South	-	1	5	21	-	-	-	12	39	374	41	209,640	1,619,459
Katwa	1	1	5	13	-	-	-	8	28	452	59	65,055	1,291,942
Kalna	1	1	4	17	-	-	-	20	43	619	45	49,640	1,186,491
Purba Bardhaman district	3	5	19	74	2	-	1	109	213	4,360	699	481,061	6,623,681

Medical facilities available in Katwa subdivision are as follows:

Hospitals: (Name, location, beds)
Katwa Subdivisional Hospital, Katwa, 250 beds
Indian Red Cross Society, Katwa, 13 beds
Rural Hospitals: (Name, CD block, location, beds)
Singot Rural Hospital, Mangalkote CD block, Singot, PO Mathrun, 50 beds
Ramjibanpur Rural Hospital, Ketugram I CD block, Ramjibanpur, PO Jnandas Kandra, 30 beds
Block Primary Health Centres: (Name, block, location, beds)
Srikhanda BPHC, Katwa I CD block, Srikhanda, 15 beds
Noapara BPHC, Katwa II CD block, Noapara, PO Dainhat, 15 beds
Ketugram BPHC, Ketugram II CD block, Ketugram, 15 beds
Mogalkote BPHC, Mongalkote CD block, Nutanhat, 15 beds
Primary Health Centres: (CD block-wise)(CD block, PHC location, beds)
Katwa I: Chandrapur (10), Kaithan (6), Sudpur (6)
Katwa II: Agradwip (10), Singhi (6)
Ketugram I: Ankhona (2), Pandugram, PO Khatundi (10)
Ketugram II: Sibloon (10), Sitahati (4)
Mongalkote: Chanakkasem, PO Kasem Nagar (6), Khirogram (2), Lakhoria (10), Nigon (6)

== Electoral constituencies ==
Lok Sabha (parliamentary) and Vidhan Sabha (state assembly) constituencies in Katwa subdivision were as follows:

Lok Sabha constituency	Reservation	Vidhan Sabha constituency	Reservation	CD Block and/or Gram panchayats and/or municipal areas
Bardhaman Purba	Reserved for SC	Katwa	None	Katwa municipality, Dainhat municipality, Katwa II CD Block and Khajurdihi, Sudpur, Karajgram and Goai gram panchayats of Katwa I CD Block.
		All other Vidhan Sabha segments outside Katwa subdivision		
Bolpur	Reserved for SC	Mangalkot	None	Mongalkote CD Block and Saragram, Gidhgram and Alampur gram panchayats of Katwa I CD Block
		Ketugram	None	Ketugram I and Ketugram II CD Blocks and Koshigram and Srikhanda gram panchayats of Katwa I CD Block
		Ausgram	Reserved for SC	Guskara municipality, Ausgram I and Ausgram II CD Blocks
		All other Vidhan Sabha segments outside Katwa subdivision		
