= Katwa Assembly constituency =

Katwa
- Constituency No. 270 for the West Bengal Legislative Assembly
- Interactive Map Outlining Katwa Assembly Constituency

Constituency details
- Country: India
- Region: East India
- State: West Bengal
- District: Purba Bardhaman
- Lok Sabha constituency: Bardhaman Purba
- Established: 1951
- Total electors: 211,459
- Reservation: None

Member of Legislative Assembly
- 18th West Bengal Legislative Assembly
- Incumbent Krishna Ghosh
- Party: BJP
- Alliance: NDA
- Elected year: 2026

Katwa Assembly constituency is an assembly constituency in Purba Bardhaman district in the Indian state of West Bengal.

== Overview ==
As per orders of the Delimitation Commission, No. 270 Katwa assembly constituency covers Katwa municipality, Dainhat municipality, Katwa II community development block and Khajurdihi, Sudpur, Karajgram and Goai gram panchayats of Katwa I CD Block.

As per orders of Delimitation Commission it is part of No. 38 Bardhaman Purba Lok Sabha constituency. Katwa assembly segment was earlier part of Katwa Lok Sabha constituency.

== Members of the Legislative Assembly ==
| Year | Name | Party |
|---|---|---|
| 1951 | Subodh Chowdhury | Communist Party of India |
| 1957 | Tarapada Chaudhuri | Indian National Congress |
| 1962 | Subodh Chowdhury | Communist Party of India |
| 1967 | Subodh Chowdhury | Communist Party of India (Marxist) |
| 1969 | Nityananda Thakur | Indian National Congress |
| 1971 | Haramohan Sinha | Communist Party of India (Marxist) |
| 1972 | Subrata Mukherjee | Indian National Congress |
| 1977 | Haramohan Sinha | Communist Party of India (Marxist) |
| 1982 | Haramohan Sinha | Communist Party of India (Marxist) |
| 1987 | Anjan Chatterjee | Communist Party of India (Marxist) |
| 1991 | Anjan Chatterjee | Communist Party of India (Marxist) |
| 1996 | Rabindranath Chatterjee | Indian National Congress |
| 2001 | Rabindranath Chatterjee | Indian National Congress |
| 2006 | Rabindranath Chatterjee | Indian National Congress |
| 2011 | Rabindranath Chatterjee | Indian National Congress |
| 2016 | Rabindranath Chatterjee | Trinamool Congress |
| 2021 | Rabindranath Chatterjee | Trinamool Congress |
| 2026 | Krishna Ghosh | Bharatiya Janata Party |

== Election results ==
=== 2026 ===
2026 West Bengal Legislative Assembly election: Katwa
| Party | Candidate | Votes | % | ±% |
|---|---|---|---|---|
| BJP | Krishna Ghosh | 122,020 | 50.94 | ▲6.95 |
| AITC | Rabindranath Chatterjee | 86,954 | 36.30 | ▼11.77 |
| CPI(M) | Sanjib Kumar Das | 17,939 | 7.49 | |
| INC | Ranajit Chatterjee | 4,233 | 1.77 | ▼4.01 |
| AJUP | Sippy Tewary | 2,307 | 0.96 | |
| NOTA | None of the above | 1,486 | 0.62 | ▼0.17 |
| Majority | | 35,066 | 14.64 | ▲10.56 |
| Turnout | | 239,536 | 93.08 | ▲9.24 |
| BJP gain from AITC | | Swing | | |

=== 2021 ===
2021 West Bengal Legislative Assembly election: Katwa
| Party | Candidate | Votes | % | ±% |
|---|---|---|---|---|
| AITC | Rabindranath Chatterjee | 107,894 | 48.07 | ▲3.26 |
| BJP | Shyama Majumdar | 98,739 | 43.99 | ▲36.67 |
| INC | Prabir Ganguli | 12,976 | 5.78 | ▼38.58 |
| NOTA | None of the above | 1,780 | 0.79 | |
| Majority | | 9,155 | 4.08 | |
| Turnout | | 224,459 | 83.84 | |
| AITC hold | | Swing | | |

=== 2016 ===
2016 West Bengal Legislative Assembly election: Katwa
| Party | Candidate | Votes | % | ±% |
|---|---|---|---|---|
| AITC | Rabindranath Chatterjee | 91,489 | 44.81 | New entry |
| INC | Shyama Majumdar | 90,578 | 44.36 | ▼8.17 |
| BJP | Anil Dutta | 14,939 | 7.32 | ▲3.55 |
| NOTA | None of the above | 2,081 | 1.02 | New entry |
| PDS | Krishnadas Saha | 1,800 | 0.88 | New entry |
| SUCI(C) | Apurba Chakraborty | 1,690 | 0.83 | ▼0.31 |
| BSP | Sridam Goldar | 1,614 | 0.79 | ▼0.19 |
| Majority | | 911 | 0.45 | ▼14.31 |
| Turnout | | 2,04,191 | 83.95 | ▼3.91 |
| AITC gain from INC | | Swing | | |

=== 2011 ===
2011 West Bengal Legislative Assembly election: Katwa
| Party | Candidate | Votes | % | ±% |
|---|---|---|---|---|
| INC | Rabindranath Chatterjee | 97,951 | 52.53 | |
| CPI(M) | Sudipta Bagchi | 70,426 | 37.77 | |
| BJP | Anil Dutta | 7,036 | 3.77 | |
| PDCI | Mohammad Nasiruddin | 3,512 | 1.88 | |
| SUCI(C) | Apurba Chakraborty | 2,125 | 1.14 | |
| Independent | Chandra Chur Sarkar | 1,960 | 1.05 | |
| BSP | Ranu Goldar | 1,826 | 0.98 | |
| Independent | Kishore Kumar Ghosh | 1,642 | 0.88 | |
| Majority | | 27,525 | 14.76 | |
| Turnout | | 1,86,478 | 87.86 | |
| INC hold | | Swing | | |

=== 2006 ===
2006 West Bengal Legislative Assembly election: Katwa
| Party | Candidate | Votes | % | ±% |
|---|---|---|---|---|
| INC | Rabindranath Chatterjee | 76,806 | 48.40 | |
| CPI(M) | Sudipta Bagchi | 71,401 | 44.99 | |
| BJP | Bipul Das | 6,023 | 3.80 | |
| Independent | Apurba Chakraborty (Apu) | 4,440 | 2.80 | |
| Majority | | 5,405 | 3.41 | |
| Turnout | | | | |
| INC hold | | Swing | | |

=== 2001 ===
2001 West Bengal Legislative Assembly election: Katwa
| Party | Candidate | Votes | % | ±% |
|---|---|---|---|---|
| INC | Rabindranath Chatterjee | 77,952 | 53.48 | |
| CPI(M) | Kanak Kanti Goswami | 61,133 | 41.94 | |
| BJP | Swaraj Kumar Dey | 6,663 | 4.57 | |
| Majority | | 16,819 | 11.54 | |
| Turnout | | 145,779 | 80.31 | |
| INC hold | | Swing | | |

=== 1996 ===
1996 West Bengal Legislative Assembly election: Katwa
| Party | Candidate | Votes | % | ±% |
|---|---|---|---|---|
| INC | Rabindra Nath Chatterjee | 70,517 | 50.42 | |
| CPI(M) | Anjan Chatterjee | 63,172 | 45.17 | |
| BJP | Satya Gopal Ganguly | 4,076 | 2.91 | |
| Independent | Uttam Kejriwal | 2,094 | 1.50 | |
| Majority | | 7,345 | 5.25 | |
| Turnout | | 141,568 | 85.39 | |
| Swing to INC from CPI(M) | | Swing | | |

=== 1991 ===
1991 West Bengal Legislative Assembly election: Katwa
| Party | Candidate | Votes | % | ±% |
|---|---|---|---|---|
| CPI(M) | Anjan Chatterjee | 49,223 | 42.08 | |
| INC | Rabindra Nath Chatterjee | 45,180 | 38.63 | |
| BJP | Santanu Sinha | 14,266 | 12.20 | |
| Independent | Hara Mohan Sinha | 7,708 | 6.59 | |
| Independent | Harihar Bairaggya | 589 | 0.50 | |
| Majority | | 4,043 | 3.45 | |
| Turnout | | 120,513 | 80.58 | |
| CPI(M) hold | | Swing | | |

=== 1987 ===
1987 West Bengal Legislative Assembly election: Katwa
| Party | Candidate | Votes | % | ±% |
|---|---|---|---|---|
| CPI(M) | Anjan Chatterjee | 53,233 | 54.17 | |
| INC | Rabindra Nath Chatterjee | 42,741 | 43.50 | |
| LKD | Hara Gopal Ghosh | 1,538 | 1.57 | |
| Independent | Ajit Chatterjee | 750 | 0.76 | |
| Majority | | 10,492 | 10.68 | |
| Turnout | | 100,091 | 77.79 | |
| CPI(M) hold | | Swing | | |

=== 1982 ===
1982 West Bengal Legislative Assembly election: Katwa
| Party | Candidate | Votes | % | ±% |
|---|---|---|---|---|
| CPI(M) | Haramohan Sinha | 44,761 | 53.34 | |
| INC | Subrata Mukhopadhyay | 36,195 | 43.14 | |
| Independent | Ganguly Subhasis | 2,322 | 2.77 | |
| Independent | Mahadeb Dalal | 631 | 0.75 | |
| Majority | | 8,566 | 10.20 | |
| Turnout | | 85,676 | 77.08 | |
| CPI(M) hold | | Swing | | |

=== 1977 ===
1977 West Bengal Legislative Assembly election: Katwa
| Party | Candidate | Votes | % | ±% |
|---|---|---|---|---|
| CPI(M) | Haramohan Sinha | 36,290 | 61.15 | |
| JP | Nityananda Thakur | 12,556 | 21.16 | |
| INC | Subrata Mukherjee | 10,496 | 17.69 | |
| Majority | | 23,734 | 39.99 | |
| Turnout | | 60,332 | 62.29 | |
| Swing to CPI(M) from INC | | Swing | | |

=== 1972 ===
1972 West Bengal Legislative Assembly election: Katwa
| Party | Candidate | Votes | % | ±% |
|---|---|---|---|---|
| INC | Subrata Mukherje | 33,061 | 60.37 | |
| CPI(M) | Hara Mohan Sinha | 21,703 | 39.63 | |
| Majority | | 11,358 | 20.74 | |
| Turnout | | 56,091 | 64.46 | |
| Swing to INC from CPI(M) | | Swing | | |

=== 1971 ===
1971 West Bengal Legislative Assembly election: Katwa
| Party | Candidate | Votes | % | ±% |
|---|---|---|---|---|
| CPI(M) | Haramohan Sinha | 27,656 | 54.70 | |
| INC | Subrata Mukherjee | 20,990 | 41.51 | |
| INC(O) | Tarapada Bandyopadhyay | 1,916 | 3.79 | |
| Majority | | 6,666 | 13.19 | |
| Turnout | | 52,696 | 63.81 | |
| Swing to CPI(M) from INC | | Swing | | |

=== 1969 ===
1969 West Bengal Legislative Assembly election: Katwa
| Party | Candidate | Votes | % | ±% |
|---|---|---|---|---|
| INC | Thakur Nityananda | 26,182 | 51.37 | |
| CPI(M) | Hara Mohan Sinha | 24,080 | 47.25 | |
| LKD | Ahdyapak Bhabesh Chandra | 702 | 1.38 | |
| Majority | | 2,102 | 4.12 | |
| Turnout | | 52,524 | 68.88 | |
| Swing to INC from CPI(M) | | Swing | | |

=== 1967 ===
1967 West Bengal Legislative Assembly election: Katwa
| Party | Candidate | Votes | % | ±% |
|---|---|---|---|---|
| CPI(M) | S. Chowdhury | 20,870 | 48.81 | |
| INC | T. Bandyopadhyay | 20,263 | 47.39 | |
| Independent | G. Haladhar | 946 | 2.21 | |
| Independent | S. K. Banerjee | 679 | 1.59 | |
| Majority | | 607 | 1.42 | |
| Turnout | | 44,901 | 60.31 | |
| Swing to CPI(M) from CPI | | Swing | | |

=== 1962 ===
1962 West Bengal Legislative Assembly election: Katwa
| Party | Candidate | Votes | % | ±% |
|---|---|---|---|---|
| CPI | Subodh Choudhury | 24,477 | 56.81 | |
| INC | Nityananda Thakur | 18,612 | 43.19 | |
| Majority | | 5,865 | 13.62 | |
| Turnout | | 44,735 | 58.38 | |
| Swing to CPI from INC | | Swing | | |

=== 1957 ===
1957 West Bengal Legislative Assembly election: Katwa
| Party | Candidate | Votes | % | ±% |
|---|---|---|---|---|
| INC | Tarapada Chaudhuri | 20,102 | 54.30 | |
| CPI | Subodh Chaudhuri | 15,799 | 42.67 | |
| HM | Haridas Saha | 1,121 | 3.03 | |
| Majority | | 4,303 | 11.63 | |
| Turnout | | 37,022 | 56.77 | |
| Swing to INC from CPI | | Swing | | |

=== 1951 ===
1951 West Bengal Legislative Assembly election: Katwa
| Party | Candidate | Votes | % | ±% |
|---|---|---|---|---|
| CPI | Subodh Chowdhury | 10,035 | 35.10 | |
| INC | Basanta Kumar Bandyopadyyay | 7,965 | 27.86 | |
| HM | Sambhu Kali Bhattacharjee | 3,184 | 11.14 | |
| Independent | Kamalapati Chowdhury | 2,906 | 10.17 | |
| ABJS | Dwijapada Kundu | 2,782 | 9.73 | |
| Independent | Gunendra Nath Mukhopadhyaya | 950 | 3.32 | |
| Independent | Asoke Kumar Bandyapadhyay | 766 | 2.68 | |
| Majority | | 2,070 | 7.24 | |
| Turnout | | 28,588 | 49.76 | |
| CPI win (new seat) | | | | |
