= Katwa =

City in West Bengal, India

- Town
- Location in West Bengal, India Katwa (India)
- Coordinates: 23.65°N 88.13°E
- Country: India
- State: West Bengal
- District: Purba Bardhaman

Government
  - Type: Municipality
  - Body: Katwa Municipality
  - Chairman: Vacant
  - Vice Chairman: Vacant
  - MP: Dr. Sharmila Sarkar
  - MLA: Mr. Krishna Ghosh (BJP)

Area
  - Total: 7.93 km^{2} (3.06 sq mi)
- Elevation: 21 m (69 ft)

Population (2011)
  - Total: 81,615
  - Density: 10,300/km^{2} (26,700/sq mi)

Languages
  - Official: Bengali, English
- Time zone: UTC+5:30 (IST)
- PIN: 713130
- Telephone code: +91 3453
- Vehicle registration: WB 75
- Lok Sabha constituency: Bardhaman Purba
- Vidhan Sabha constituency: Katwa
- Website: purbabardhaman.gov.in

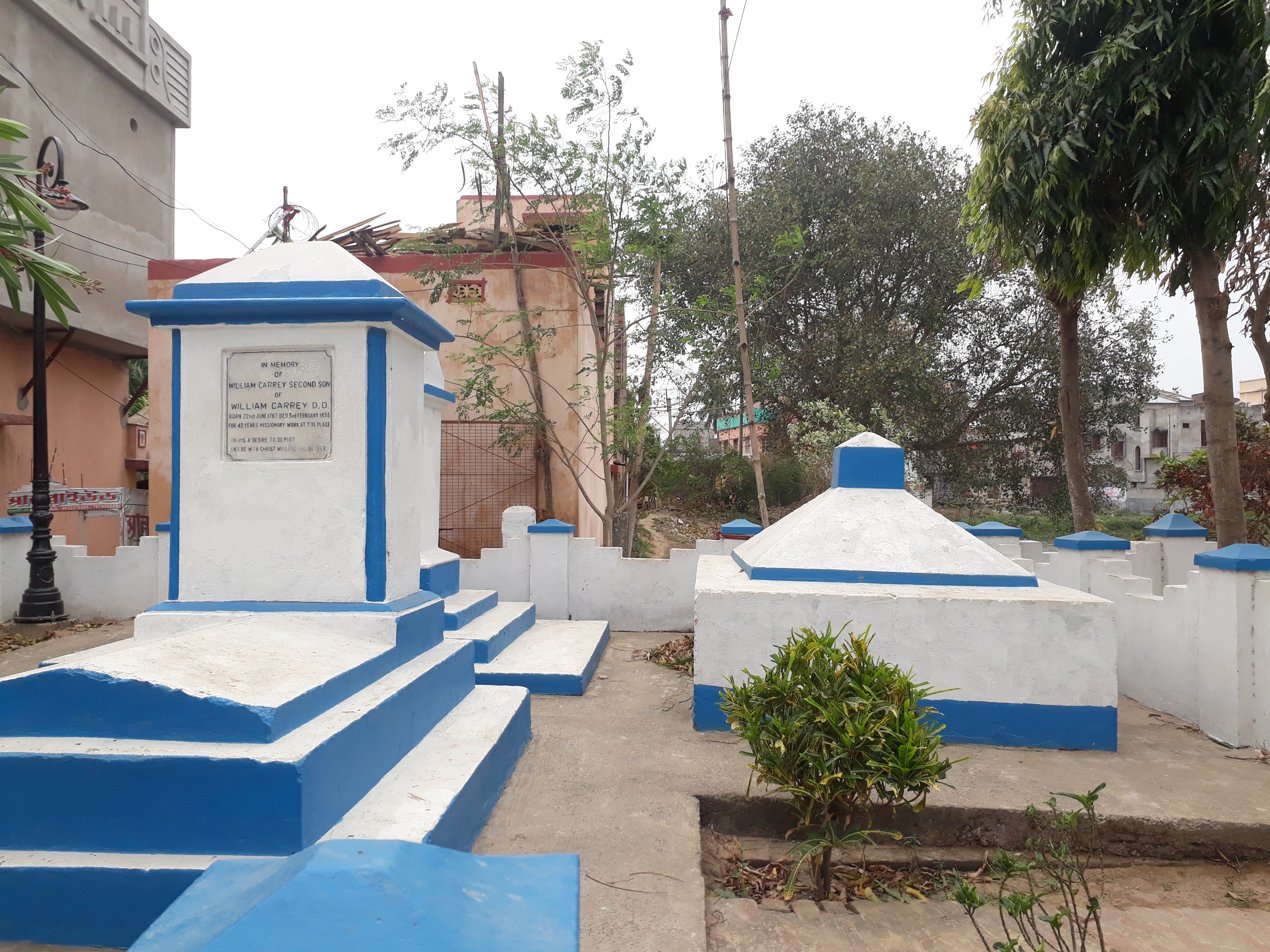
Tomb of William Carrey Junior at Katwa

Katwa is a sub-divisional town and railway junction in Purba Bardhaman district of the Indian state of West Bengal. It is the headquarters of the Katwa subdivision. The town was built at the confluence of the Ganga and Ajay rivers. Katwa is a border city of three districts; Purba Bardhaman District, Nadia District and Murshidabad District.

== Geography ==
Cities and towns in the Katwa subdivision of Purba Bardhaman district
M: municipal city/ town, CT: census town, R: rural/ urban centre, H: historical place/ religious and/ or cultural centre, C: craft centre.
Owing to space constraints in the small map, the actual locations in a larger map may vary slightly

=== Location ===
Katwa is located at 23.65°N 88.13°E. It has an average elevation of 21 m (69 ft). It is situated between the Ajay River and the Hooghly River and so is bounded by water to the east, west, and north.

=== Police station ===
Katwa police station has jurisdiction over Katwa and Dainhat municipalities, and Katwa I and Katwa II CD Blocks. The area covered is 351.03 km^{2}.

=== Urbanisation ===
88.44% of the population of the Katwa subdivision live in rural areas. Only 11.56% of the population live in the urban areas. The map alongside presents some of the notable locations in the subdivision. All places marked on the map are linked in the larger full-screen map.

== History ==
Katwa (Skt. Kātādvīpa) has been proposed as the "Katadupa" mentioned by Pliny the Elder (circa 24-74 CE), marking it as the city by which flows the River Amystis, taken to imply the Ajay River.

The small town has a historical background of five hundred years. The earliest name of Katwa was Indranee Pargana. Later the name was changed to Kantak Nagari. In January 1510, Sri Sri Chaitanya Mahaprabhu received "Diksha" from his guru Kesava Bharati at the site of the current Sri Gauranga Bari Temple in Katwa. Since then, this small township has been a sacred place for Vaishnavites.

The location of the town at the confluence of two navigable rivers, Ajay and Bhagirathi, made the town strategically important. Katwa was considered the gateway to Murshidabad, the erstwhile capital of the subah of Bengal. Nawab Murshid Quli Khan, Nawab of Bengal, first established a chowki at Katwa during his reign (1717-1727). Between 1742 and 1751, Katwa was invaded by the Bargis (break-away Maratha groups) several times, as part of the Maratha invasions of Bengal. It was the site of the First Battle of Katwa (1742) and the Second Battle of Katwa (1745), with Nawab Alivardi Khan of Bengal defeating the Marathas both times. In the Battle of Plassey (1757), on 19 June 1757, Katwa was the last Nawabi garrison conquered by British forces before heading to Plassey. Robert Clive held a council of war in Katwa on 21 June 1757, where the decision was taken to cross the Hooghly River to Plassey. On 19 July 1763, Katwa was once again the scene of action during the Third Battle of Katwa, where British troops fought and defeated a contingent of troops loyal to Nawab Mir Qasim.

Under the aegis of the British East India Company, Katwa became an urban settlement, encouraged by the presence of missionaries such as William Carey Jr., the son of William Carey. By the 1800s, Katwa had become a thriving trading town with the principal economic activity being the riverine trade in salt. The modern town of Katwa was established in 1850 when it was granted the status of a subdivisional town under the 10th Act of Municipal Rules. The Municipality of Katwa as a governing entity was established on 1 April 1869. The urbanization of Katwa received a further boost with the construction of railroads in the early 20th century: Katwa-Azimganj (constructed in 1903), Katwa-Bandel (1912), Katwa-Bardhaman (1915), Katwa-Ahmedpur (1917).

== Demographics ==
As per the 2011 Census of India, Katwa had a total population of 81,615, of which 41,350 (51%) were males and 40,265 (49%) were females. The population below 6 years was 6,799. The total number of literates in Katwa was 65,187 (79.87% of the population over 6 years).

In 2011, the population breakdown by religion was: Hindus (66,899), Muslims (14,488), Sikhs (50), Christians (44), Buddhists (9), Jains (4), and Unspecified/Not Stated (121).

Religion in Katwa
Hindu	81.97%
Muslim	17.75%
Christian	0.06%
Others	0.22%

Katwa has a total area of 8.53 km^{2} with a population density of 9,681/km^{2}. A steady flow of refugees from East Pakistan increased the population of the area in the fifties.

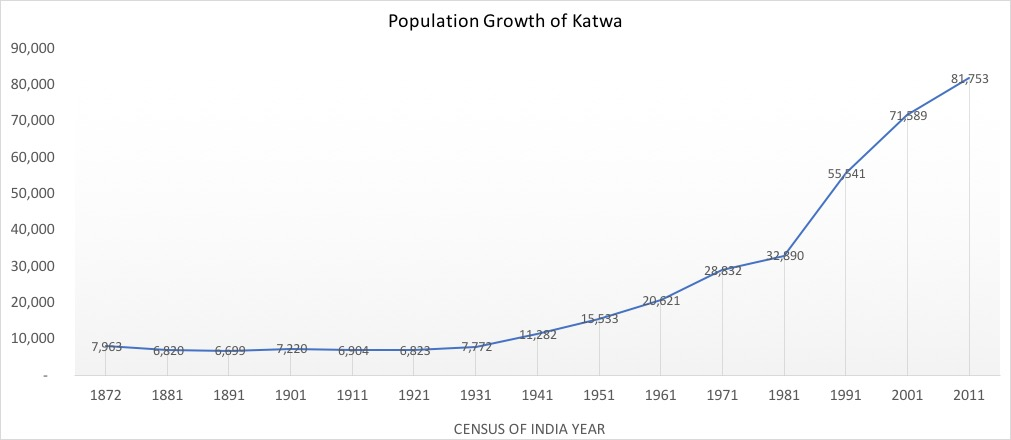
Population Growth of Katwa (1872-2011)

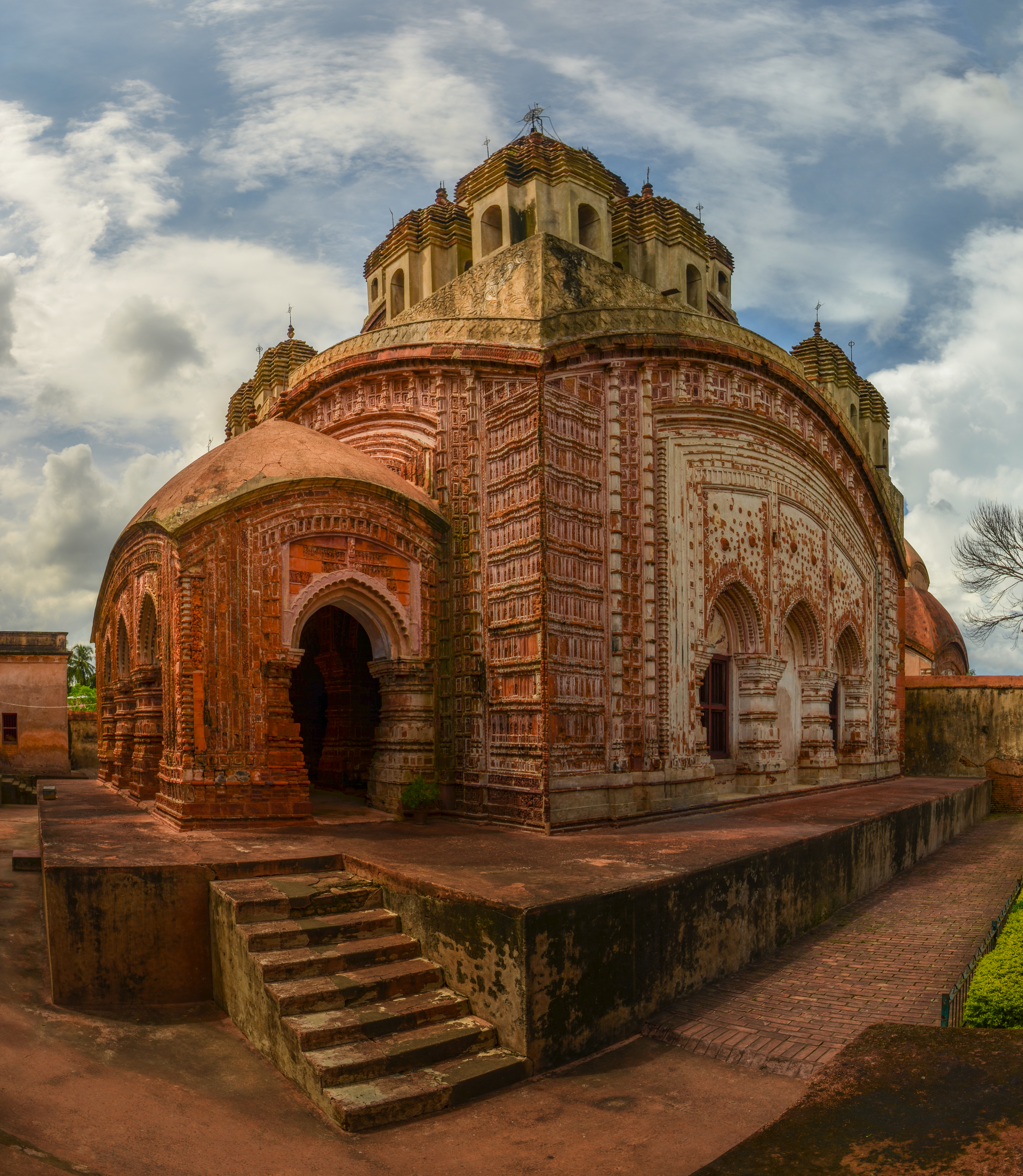
Krishnachandra Temple, Katwa

== Economy ==
The economy of Katwa is based on agriculture and agro-related trades. The fertile soil of the surrounding areas is enriched by the alluvium from the Hooghly, Ajay and Damodar rivers. The major crops farmed in the countryside surrounding Katwa include rice, jute, mustard, sugarcane, tea, coffee and various tropical vegetables. Katwa is an essential center for marketing the region's agricultural products and for providing retail and consumer services to the surrounding population. Industries are limited to cottage industries and small-scale agro-related industries, e.g. rice mills, jute products, etc.

Within the urban area, as of 2011, 0.81% of workers are employed in the primary (agricultural) sector, 5.96% of workers are employed in the secondary (manufacturing) sector, and 93.70% of workers are employed in the tertiary (services) sector.

The Katwa Super Thermal Power Station is a super critical (660MW x2) 1320 MW coal-fired power plant currently in planning stage by NTPC at Srikhanda Village, 8 km from Katwa.

=== Tourism ===
Areas of tourism interest in the town include:

- Sri Gauranga Bari Temple: where Sri Sri Chaitanya Mahaprabhu received "Diksha" from his guru Kesava Bharati.
- Madhaitala Ashram: the ashram was visited by Jagai and Madhai, two famous disciples of Sri Chaitanya Mahaprabhu, and remains a center of Gaudiya Vaishnav culture.
- Shah Alam's Dargah: a building of archaeological interest built in the early-18th century by Nawab Murshid Quli Khan, Nawab of Bengal.

== Human resources ==
=== Library ===
- Katwa Sub-Divisional Library

=== Public health ===
Katwa Sub-Divisional Hospital is a 250-bed public facility providing secondary healthcare to Katwa sub-divisional area. There are a number of private nursing centers that serve the town, as well.

Anandaniketan Society for Mental Health Care is a not-for-profit organization situated five kilometers outside of Katwa, providing residential care to 350 children, adolescents, and adults who have physical, mental, and/or intellectual disabilities.

=== Public safety ===
Purba Bardhaman District Police's Katwa Police Station has jurisdiction over Katwa and Dainhat municipality areas and Katwa I and Katwa II CD Blocks. The area covered is 351.03 km^{2}.

== Culture ==
The dominant culture of Katwa is identical to that of most of West Bengal and is deeply influenced by Hindu Bengali culture. Some of the popular festivals in Katwa include:

- Poyla Boishakh or Bengali New Year (14/15 April)
- Rath Yatra (July)
- Mahalaya (September/October)
- Durga Puja (September/October)
- Lakshmi Puja (October)
- Kali Puja (October/November) and Deepawali
- Kartik Larai (November)
- Saraswati Puja (February/March)
- Dol Purnima or Dol Yatra (February/March)
- Gaura-purnima, the birthday of Chaitanya Mahaprabhu (February/March)
- Muharram

=== Kartik Larai ===
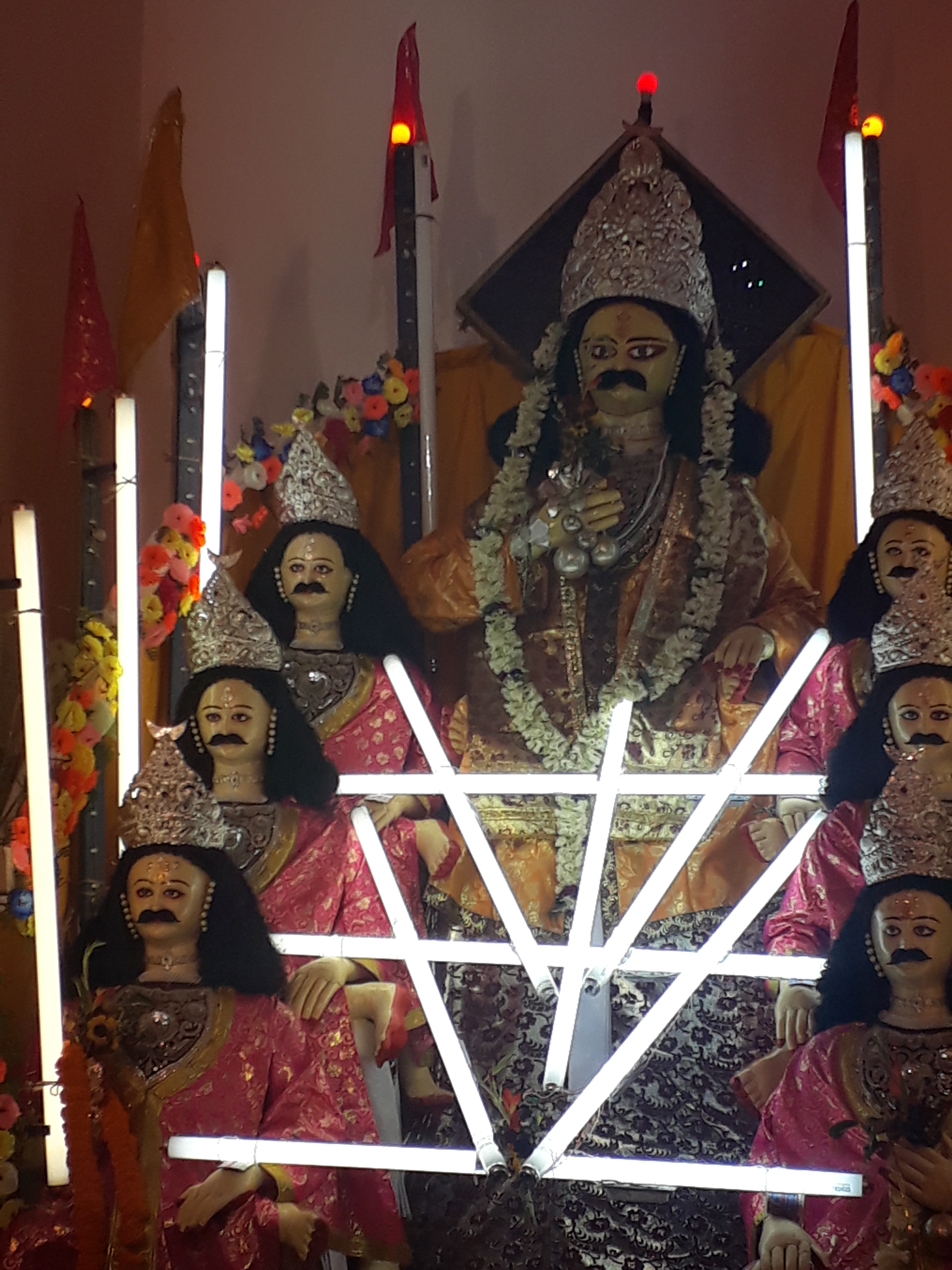
Kartik Puja at Katwa

Katwa and its surrounding areas are especially well known for their peaceful Kartik Puja, colloquially known as Kartik Larai (Larai means "battle" in Bengali). The object of worship is the boy-faced deity, Kartik in reference to the youth of the deity. In the greater Katwa area, over 250 separate organizations organize pujas and joyfully compete with each other over the sophistication of the theme or the sculpture of the deity. After the day of the puja, the deities are paraded in carnival throughout town on their way to be ritually submerged in the nearby Hooghly River. The processions usually feature religious music and dancing, leading to a town-wide, festival-like ambiance (jovially named ladai or battle) enjoyed by all participants and spectators.

== Transportation ==
=== Railway ===
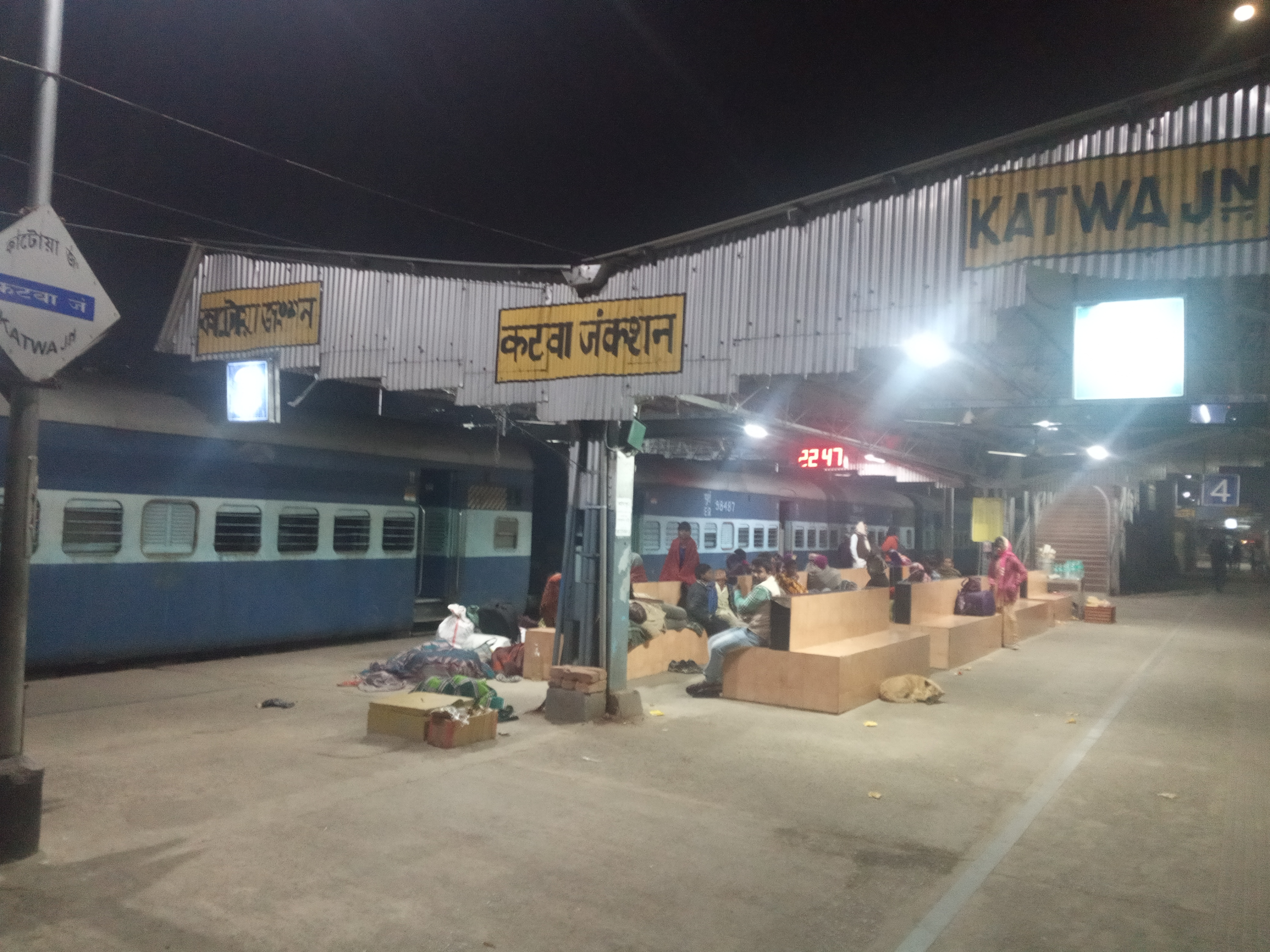
Katwa railway station

Katwa Junction is a railway junction on 5 ft 6 in (1,676 mm) broad gauge railway line from Howrah railway station to New Jalpaiguri railway station via Azimganj Junction railway station. Although Katwa is a railway junction, the number of trains running through this station is less.

The Bardhaman-Katwa line, after conversion from narrow gauge to electrified broad gauge, was opened to the public on 12 January 2018.

The Ahmedpur-Katwa Railway line has been converted from narrow gauge to broad gauge which provides access to Rampurhat Junction railway station.

=== Waterway ===
Katwa is the site of a floating terminal on National Waterway 1 consisting of a pontoon placed on the waterfront with a berth of 30 m (98 ft).

== Government and politics ==
The town of Katwa is divided into twenty administrative wards. Each ward elects a councilor to the governing body, Katwa Municipality. Municipal elections are held every five years, with the most recent election held in 2022.

== See also ==
- Katwa (Lok Sabha constituency)
