= Maheshpur railway station =

Railway station in West Bengal

General information
- Location: Maheshpur, Birbhum district, West Bengal; India
- Coordinates: 23.7880°N 87.8368°E
- System: Indian Railways station
- Owner: Indian Railways
- Operator: Eastern Railway
- Line: Ahmadpur–Katwa line
- Platforms: 1
- Tracks: 1

Construction
- Structure type: Standard (on ground station)

Other information
- Status: Closed
- Station code: MHSP
- Zone(s): Eastern Railway
- Division(s): Howrah railway division

History
- Opened: 1917
- Closed: 2013
- Former names: McLeod's Light Railways

Services
Preceding station	Indian Railways	Following station
Labpur towards ?	Eastern Railway zone Ahmadpur–Katwa line	Kirnahar towards ?
Location

Maheshpur railway station was a railway station in Ahmadpur–Katwa line under Howrah railway division of Eastern Railway zone. It was situated at Maheshpur of Birbhum district in the Indian state of West Bengal. With the conversion of the Ahmadpur–Katwa line to broad gauge this station was abandoned.

== History ==
Ahmedpur–Katwa narrow-gauge railway line connecting Ahmedpur and Katwa was established on 29 September 1917 by McLeod's Light Railways. Indian Railways had taken over the operation of this narrow-gauge railway from McLeod and Company in 1966. After closing this track in 2013 the railway section was converted into 1,676 mm (5 ft 6 in) broad gauge in 1917. The conversion work started in 2013 and was completed in early 2017. The track including Maheshpur railway station was reopened for the public on 24 May 2018.
