= Labpur railway station =

Railway station in West Bengal

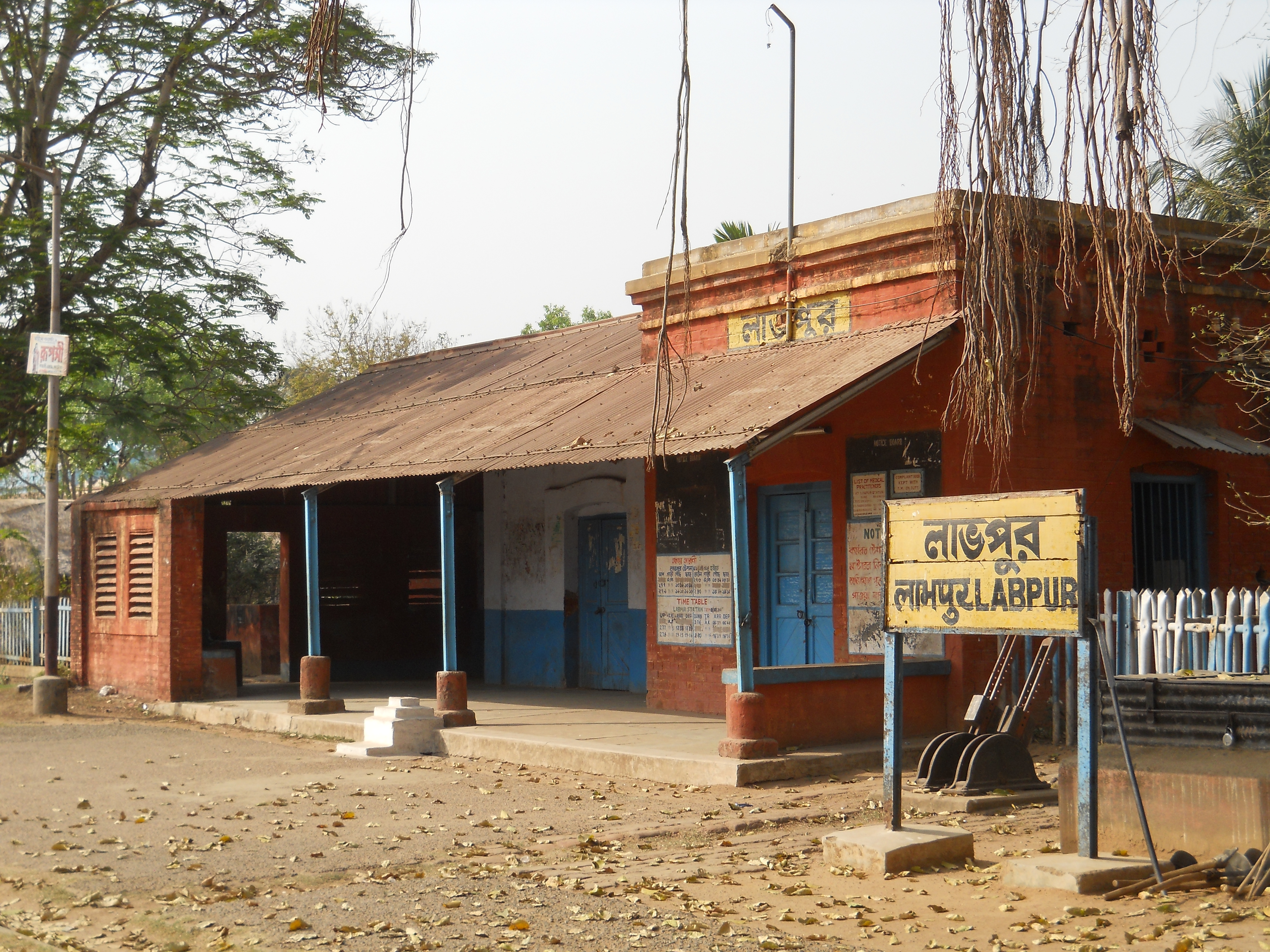

General information
- Location: State Highway 6, Labhpur, Birbhum district, West Bengal; India
- Coordinates: 23.812645°N 87.806007°E
- Elevation: 40 m (130 ft)
- System: Indian Railways station
- Owner: Indian Railways
- Operator: Eastern Railway
- Line: Ahmadpur–Katwa line
- Platforms: 3
- Tracks: 1

Construction
- Structure type: Standard (on ground station)

Other information
- Status: Functioning
- Station code: LBP
- Zone(s): Eastern Railway
- Division(s): Howrah railway division

History
- Opened: 1917
- Closed: 2013
- Rebuilt: 2018
- Former names: McLeod's Light Railways

Services
| Preceding station | Indian Railways | Following station |
|---|---|---|
| Gopalpurgram towards ? | Eastern Railway zone Ahmadpur–Katwa line | Mahespur towards ? |
Location

Labpur railway station is an important railway station in Ahmadpur–Katwa line under Howrah railway division of Eastern Railway zone. It is situated beside State Highway 6 at Labhpur of Birbhum district in the Indian state of West Bengal. The railway station is the gateway to the Fullara Maa Shakta pitha Temple, one of the 51 Shakta pithas in India. It also connects to Tarashankar's homeland and the Hansuli Bank area.

== History ==
Ahmedpur–Katwa narrow-gauge railway line connecting Ahmedpur and Katwa was established on 29 September 1917 by McLeod's Light Railways. Indian Railways had taken over the operation of this narrow-gauge railway from McLeod and Company in 1966. After closing this track in 2013 the railway section was converted into 1,676 mm (5 ft 6 in) broad gauge in 1917. The conversion work started in 2013 and was completed in early 2017. The track including Labpur railway station was reopened for the public on 24 May 2018.

== Platforms ==
Labpur station is on a single electrified track and has three platforms-1, 2 and 3.

== Broad Gauge Trains ==
The station is served by eight broad-gauge local trains operating daily, which include passenger trains as well as MEMU (Mainline Electric Multiple Unit) and EMU (Electric Multiple Unit) services. These are:

- 03037 Katwa - Ahmadpur MEMU special
- 03055 Katwa - Ahmadpur Express special
- 03099 Katwa - Ahmadpur MEMU Special
- 35041 Katwa - Ahmadpur EMU Passenger
- 03038 Ahmadpur - Katwa MEMU special
- 03056 Ahmadpur - Katwa Express Special
- 03100 Ahmadpur - Katwa MEMU Special
- 35042 Ahmadpur - Katwa EMU Passenger

== Tourism ==
- Fullara:

The Fullara Maa Shakta pitha Temple is located 1.5 km from Labpur Railway Station. According to mythology, when Mahadeva danced around with Sati's dead body cutting it to pieces, the lip fell at Fullara. There is a big pond beside the temple. According to hearsay, Hanuman collected 108 blue lotuses from the pond when Sri Ramachandra required them for the worship of goddess Durga. It is considered to be one of the fifty-one Shakta pithas in India. A 10-day fair is organized near Fullara temple during Magha Purnima.

- Tarashankar country and Hansuli Bank:

Tarashankar Bandopadhyay, the Bengali writer, was born at Labhpur on 23 July 1898. He passed matriculation from Labhpur in 1916. Many of his novels and stories carry vivid descriptions of the area. He wrote 65 novels, 53-story-books, 12 plays, 4 essay-books, 4 autobiographies, 2 travel stories and composed several songs. He was awarded Rabindra Puraskar, Sahitya Akademi Award, Jnanpith Award, Padma Shri and Padma Bhushan.He was nominated for Nobel Prize in Literature in 1971 and posthumously nominated in 1972. In the novel Hansulibanker Upkatha, he describes the Hansulibank countryside as a somewhat rugged terrain.This Hansuli Bank is a popular tourist spot located 3.5 km from Labpur Railway Station.

== See also ==
- Labhpur
- Ahmadpur Junction railway station
- Katwa Junction railway station
- Bolpur Shantiniketan railway station
- Rampurhat Junction railway station
