= Daskalgram railway station =

Railway Station in West Bengal, India

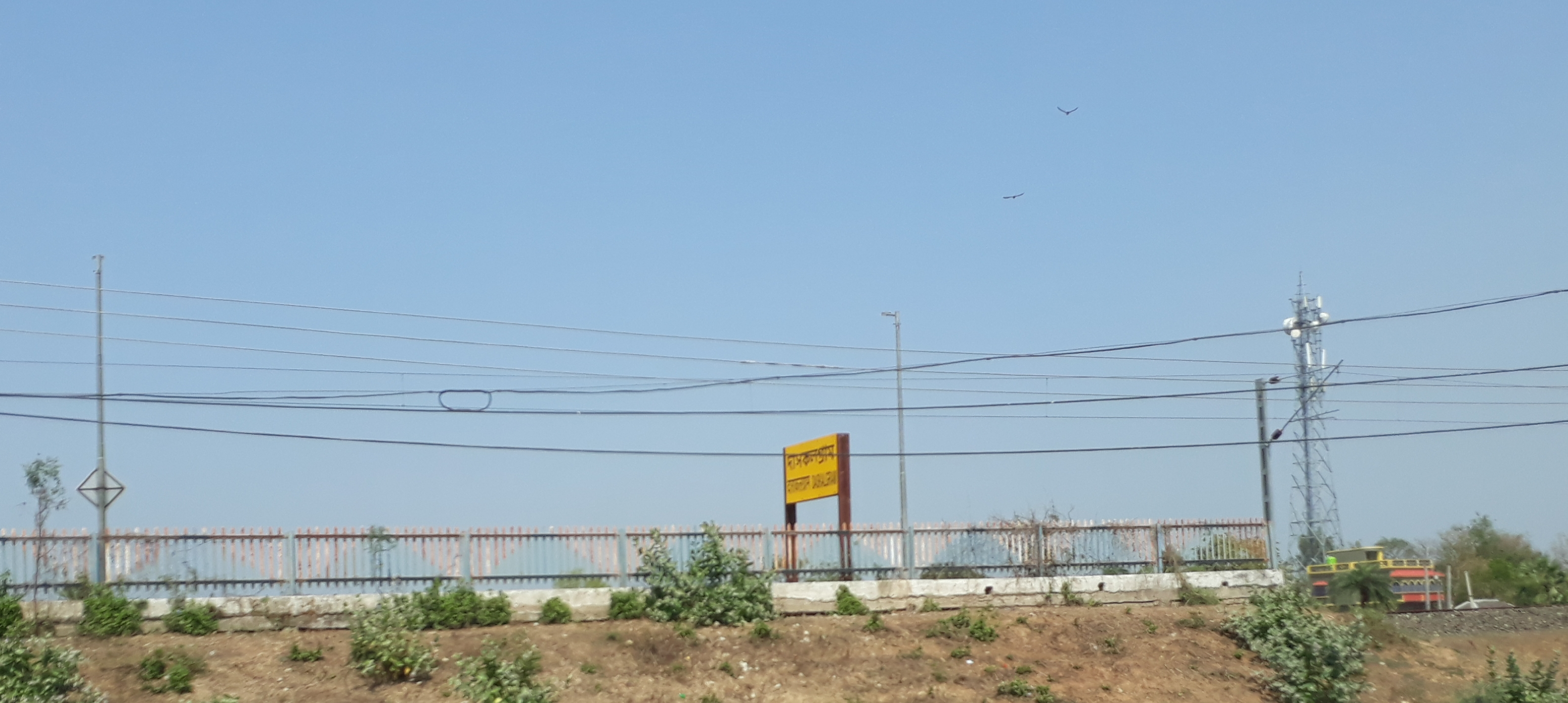
- Daskalgram railway station platform

General information
- Location: Daskalgram, Birbhum district, West Bengal; India
- Coordinates: 23.751021°N 87.927283°E
- Elevation: 30 m (98 ft)
- System: Indian Railways station
- Owner: Indian Railways
- Operator: Eastern Railway
- Line: Ahmadpur–Katwa line
- Platforms: 1
- Tracks: 1

Construction
- Structure type: Standard (on ground station)

Other information
- Status: Functioning
- Station code: DLM
- Zone(s): Eastern Railway
- Division(s): Howrah railway division

History
- Opened: 1917
- Closed: 2013
- Rebuilt: 2018
- Former names: McLeod's Light Railways

Services
Preceding station	Indian Railways	Following station
Kirnahar towards ?	Eastern Railway zone Ahmadpur–Katwa line	Kurmadanga towards ?
Location

Daskalgram railway station is a railway station in the Ahmadpur–Katwa line under the Howrah railway division of the Eastern Railway zone. It is situated in Daskalgram, Birbhum district in the Indian state of West Bengal.

== History ==
The Ahmedpur–Katwa narrow-gauge railway line connecting Ahmedpur and Katwa was established on 29 September 1917 by McLeod's Light Railways. Indian Railways took over the operation of this narrow-gauge railway from McLeod and Company in 1966. After closing the line in 2013, the railway section was converted into 1,676 mm (5 ft 6 in) broad gauge. The conversion work started in 2013 and was completed in early 2017. The track, including Daskalgram railway station, was reopened to the public on 24 May 2018.
