= Nabagram Kankurhati railway station =

Railway station in West Bengal

General information
- Location: Nabagram Kankurhati, Purba Bardhaman district, West Bengal; India
- Coordinates: 23.6606°N 88.1015°E
- Elevation: 20 m (66 ft)
- System: Indian Railways station
- Owner: Indian Railways
- Operator: Eastern Railway
- Line: Ahmadpur–Katwa line Barharwa–Azimganj–Katwa loop
- Platforms: 3
- Tracks: 2

Construction
- Structure type: Standard (on ground station)
- Parking: No
- Cycle facilities: No

Other information
- Status: Functioning
- Station code: NBKH
- Zone(s): Eastern Railway
- Division(s): Howrah railway division

History
- Opened: 1917
- Closed: 2013
- Rebuilt: 2018
- Former names: McLeod's Light Railways

Services
Preceding station	Indian Railways	Following station
Ambalgram towards ?	Eastern Railway zone Ahmadpur–Katwa line	Katwa Junction towards ?
Location

Nabagram Kankurhati is a railway station on the Ahmadpur–Katwa line under the Howrah railway division of the Eastern Railway zone. It is situated at Nabagram Kakurhati of the Purba Bardhaman district in the Indian state of West Bengal.

== History ==
The Ahmedpur–Katwa narrow-gauge railway line connecting Ahmedpur and Katwa was established on 29 September 1917 by McLeod's Light Railways. Indian Railways had taken over the operation of this narrow-gauge railway from McLeod and Company in 1966. After the closure of this track in 2013, the railway section was converted into 1,676 millimetres (5 feet 6.0 inches) broad gauge in 1917. The conversion work started in 2013 and was completed in early 2017. The track, including Nabagram Kankurhati railway station, was opened to the public on 24 May 2018.
