= Kandra, Bardhaman =

Kandra Kandara
- Village
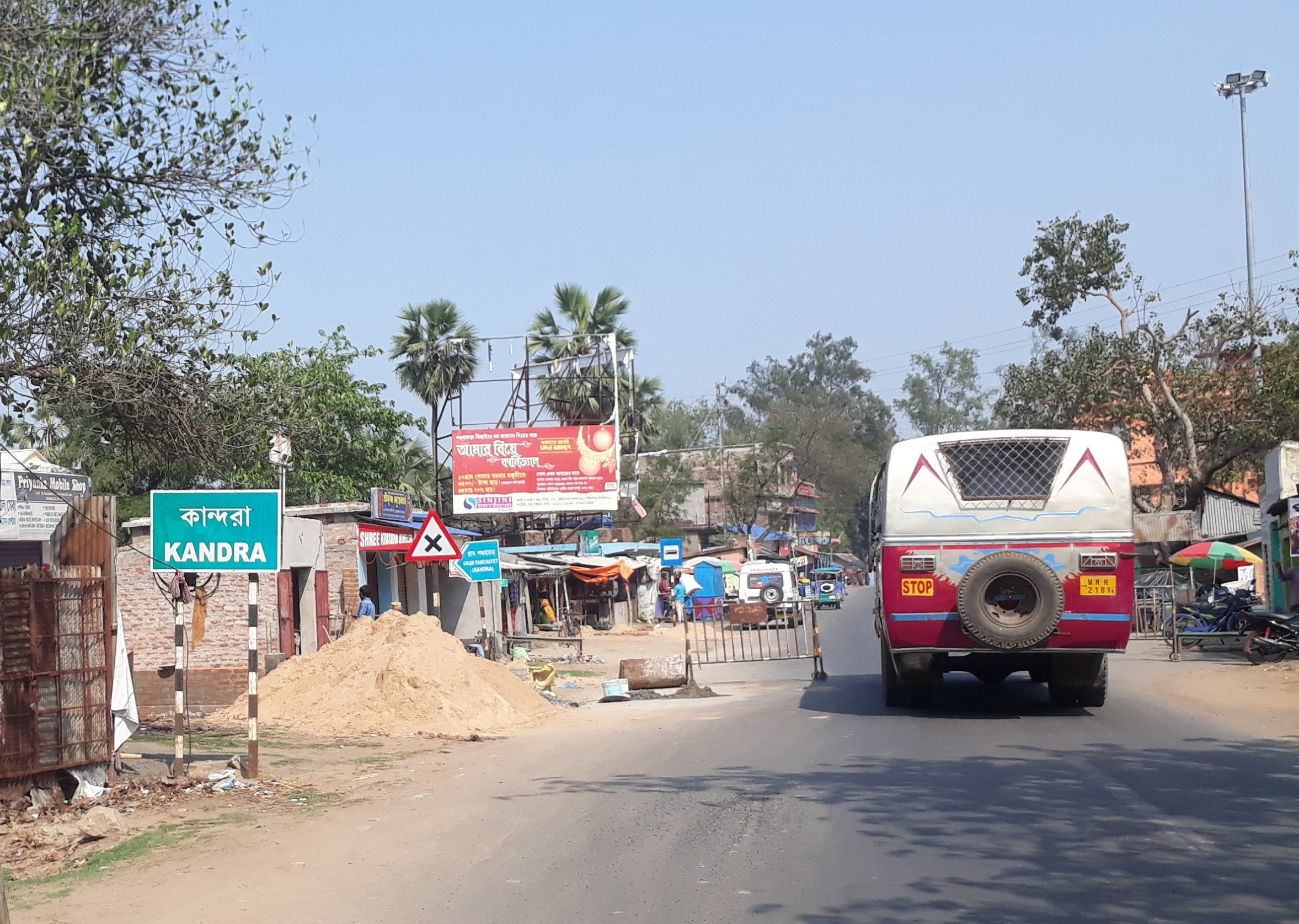
- Kandra Bus stand

- Location in West Bengal, India Kandra (India)
- Coordinates: 23°43′53.0″N 87°58′10.1″E
- Country: India
- State: West Bengal
- District: Purba Bardhaman

Population (2011)
  - Total: 11,534

Languages
  - Official: Bengali, English
- Time zone: UTC+5:30 (IST)
- PIN: 713129 (Kandra)
- Telephone/STD code: 03453
- Lok Sabha constituency: Bolpur
- Vidhan Sabha constituency: Ketugram
- Website: purbabardhaman.gov.in

Kandra is a village in Ketugram I CD block in Katwa subdivision of Purba Bardhaman district in the state of West Bengal, India.

== Geography ==
Cities and towns in the Katwa subdivision of Purba Bardhaman district
M: municipal city/ town, CT: census town, R: rural/ urban centre, H: historical place/ religious and/ or cultural centre, C: craft centre.
Owing to space constraints in the small map, the actual locations in a larger map may vary slightly

=== CD block HQ ===
The headquarters of Ketugram I CD block are located at Kandra.

=== Urbanisation ===
88.44% of the population of Katwa subdivision live in rural areas. Only 11.56% of the population live in urban areas. The map alongside presents some of the notable locations in the subdivision. All places marked in the map are linked in the larger full screen map.

== Demographics ==
As per the 2011 Census of India, Kandara had a total population of 11,534, of which 5,894 (51%) were males and 5,640 (49%) were females. Population below 6 years was 1,311. The total number of literates in Kandara was 7,238 (70.80% of the population over 6 years).

== Transport ==
The State Highway 6, running from Rajnagar (in Birbhum district) to Alampur in (Howrah district), passes through Kandra.

Jnandas Kandra railway station is a station on the 2 ft 6 in (762 mm) narrow gauge Ahmedpur Katwa Railway, which was closed and taken up for conversion to 1,676 mm (5 ft 6 in) in 2013 and reopened in 2018.

== Education ==
Kandra Radha Kanta Kundu Mahavidyalaya, established in 2001, is affiliated to the University of Burdwan. It offers honours courses in Bengali, English, Sanskrit, history and geography.

Kandra JM High School was established in 1926.

== Culture ==
Jnandas, a Vaishnava poet, was born around 1520-1535 at Kandra and the temple where he worshipped still attracts devotees. A fair is organised in his memory during Paush Purnima. Katakadas Khemananda (17th century), a poet influenced by Chaitanya Mahaprabhu, was born at Kandra.

== Healthcare ==
Ramjibanpur Rural Hospital at Ramjibanpur, PO Jnandas Kandra (with 30 beds) is the main medical facility in Ketugram I CD block. There are primary health centres at Ankhona (with 2 beds) and Pandugram, PO Khatundi (with 10 beds).

See also - Healthcare in West Bengal
