= Port Said Railway =

Narrow gauge railway in Egypt

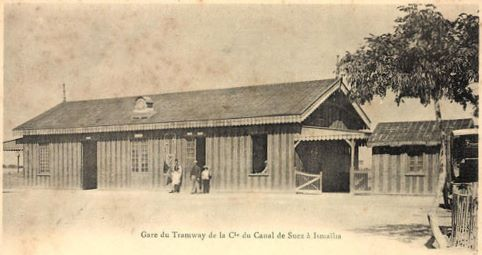
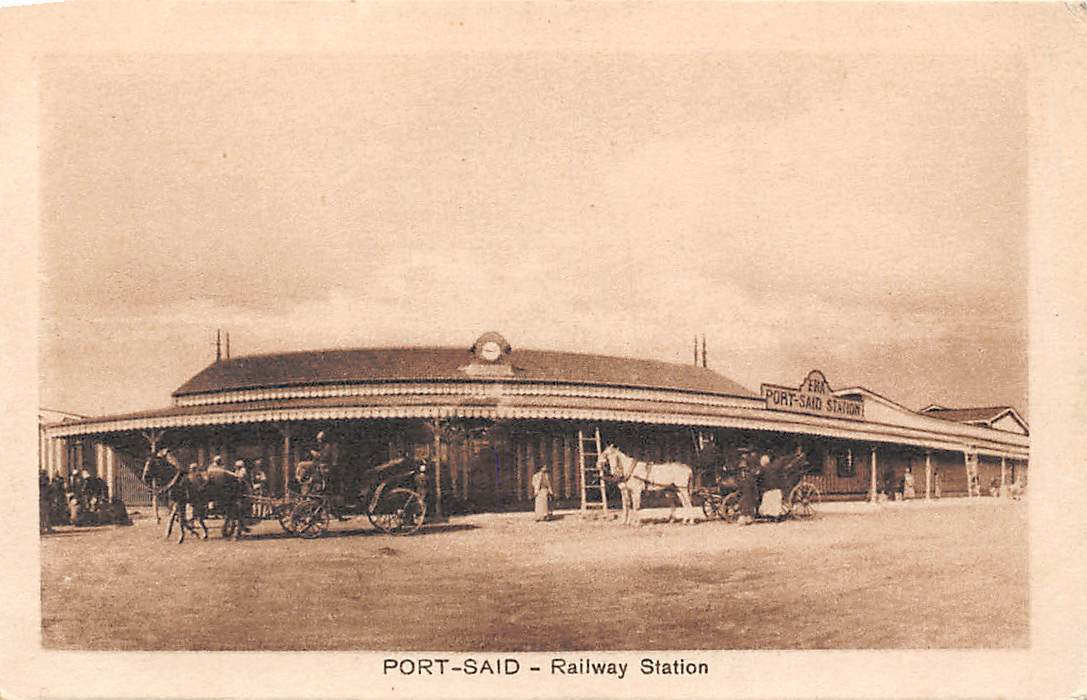
- Ismailia, Railway Station Port Said, Railway Station

Technical
- Track gauge: 750 mm

The Port Said Railway was a narrow gauge railway with a gauge of 750 mm from Ismailia to Port Said in Egypt.

== History ==
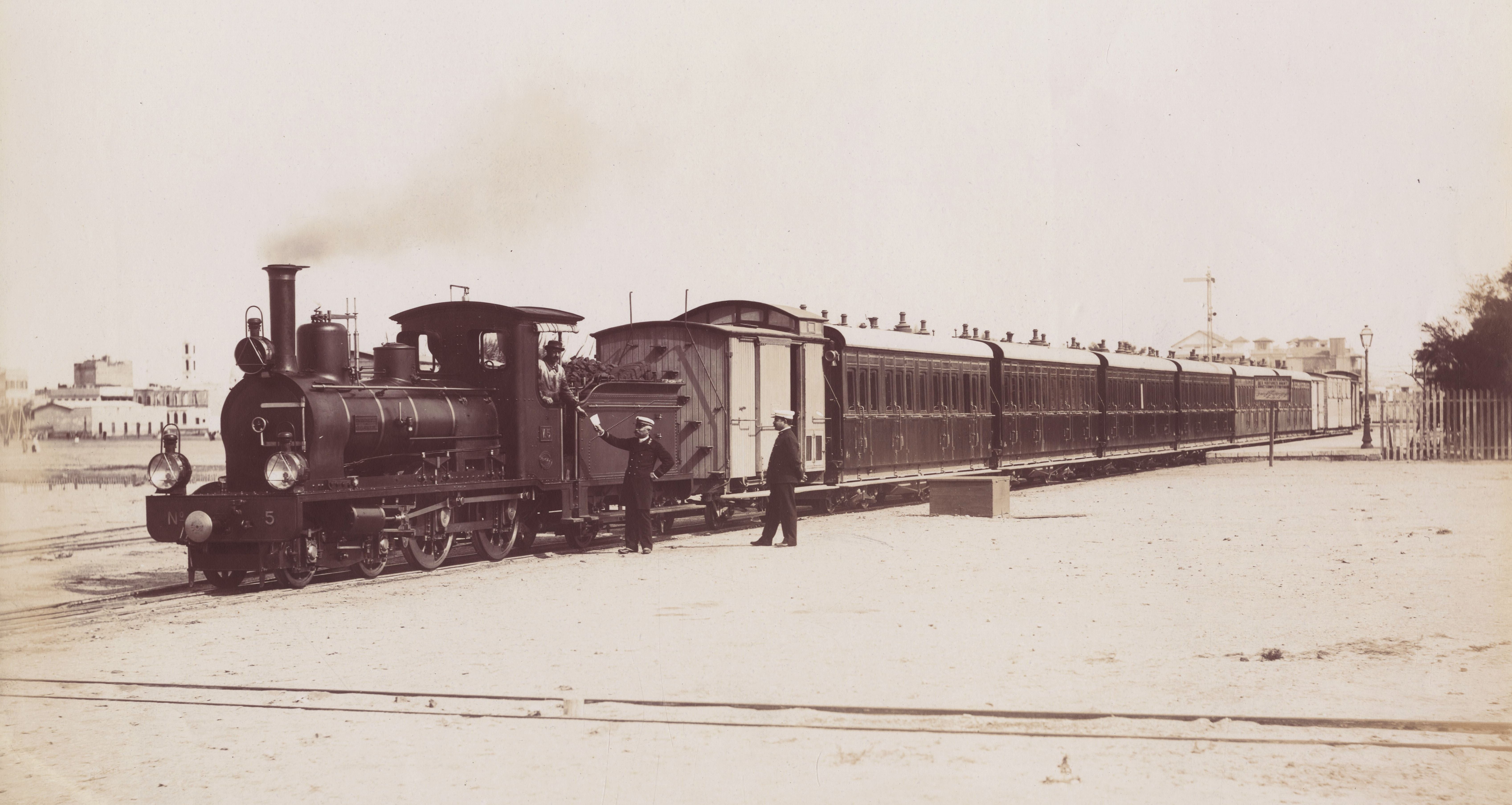
4-4-0 steam locomotive No V5

The construction of the narrow gauge railway along the Suez Canal was endorsed in 1891. It was mainly used for passenger transport, while goods were transported in barges on the canal. The railway was taken-over in 1902 by the Egyptian National Railways and regauged to standard gauge in 1904. The narrow gauge locomotives were sold to the Egyptian Delta Light Railways.

== Locomotives ==
No	Type	Cylinders	Manufacturer	Serial No	Phot and technical data	Built	Subsequent use
1-2	0-6-0		Corpet Louvet & Cie	532-533	Weight 9.9 t or 13.15 t incl. tender, wheel diameter 3 ft (914 mm)	1891	Egyptian Salt and Soda Company Railway
V1 – V4	2-4-0	9.5 x 15 inch	Société Alsacienne de Constructions Mécaniques	4458-4461	Locomotive Nr. V1	1893	Egyptian Delta Light Railways 105–108
V5	4-4-0	9.25 x 16.5 inch	Société Alsacienne de Constructions Mécaniques	4675	Locomotive No. V5	1896	Egyptian Delta Light Railways 109
V6	4-4-0		Société Alsacienne de Constructions Mécaniques			1898	

== See also ==
- Port Said railway station
