= Fullara =

Hindu temple in Birbhum, India

- Temple town
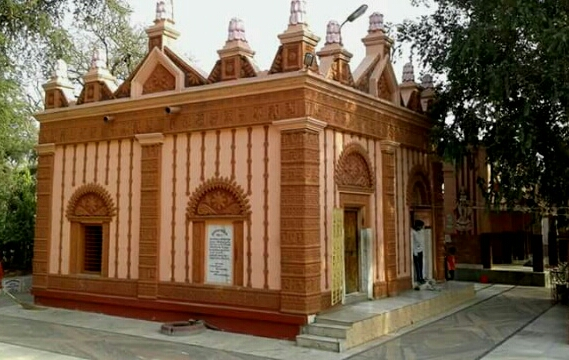
- Fullara Temple, Birbhum
- Interactive map of Fullara
- Country: India
- State: West Bengal
- District: Birbhum

Languages
  - Official: Bengali, English
- Time zone: UTC+05:30 (IST)
- Nearest city: Bolpur Shantiniketan

Fullara is a temple-town in Labpur CD Block in Bolpur subdivision of Birbhum district in West Bengal in India. It is situated near Labhpur. Fullara is about 30 km. from its nearest town Bolpur Shantiniketan. There is no image or idol in the Garbha griha in the temple, rather, a large stone (the symbol of Devi Sati) is worshiped there. It is also one of 51 Shakta pithas.

== History ==
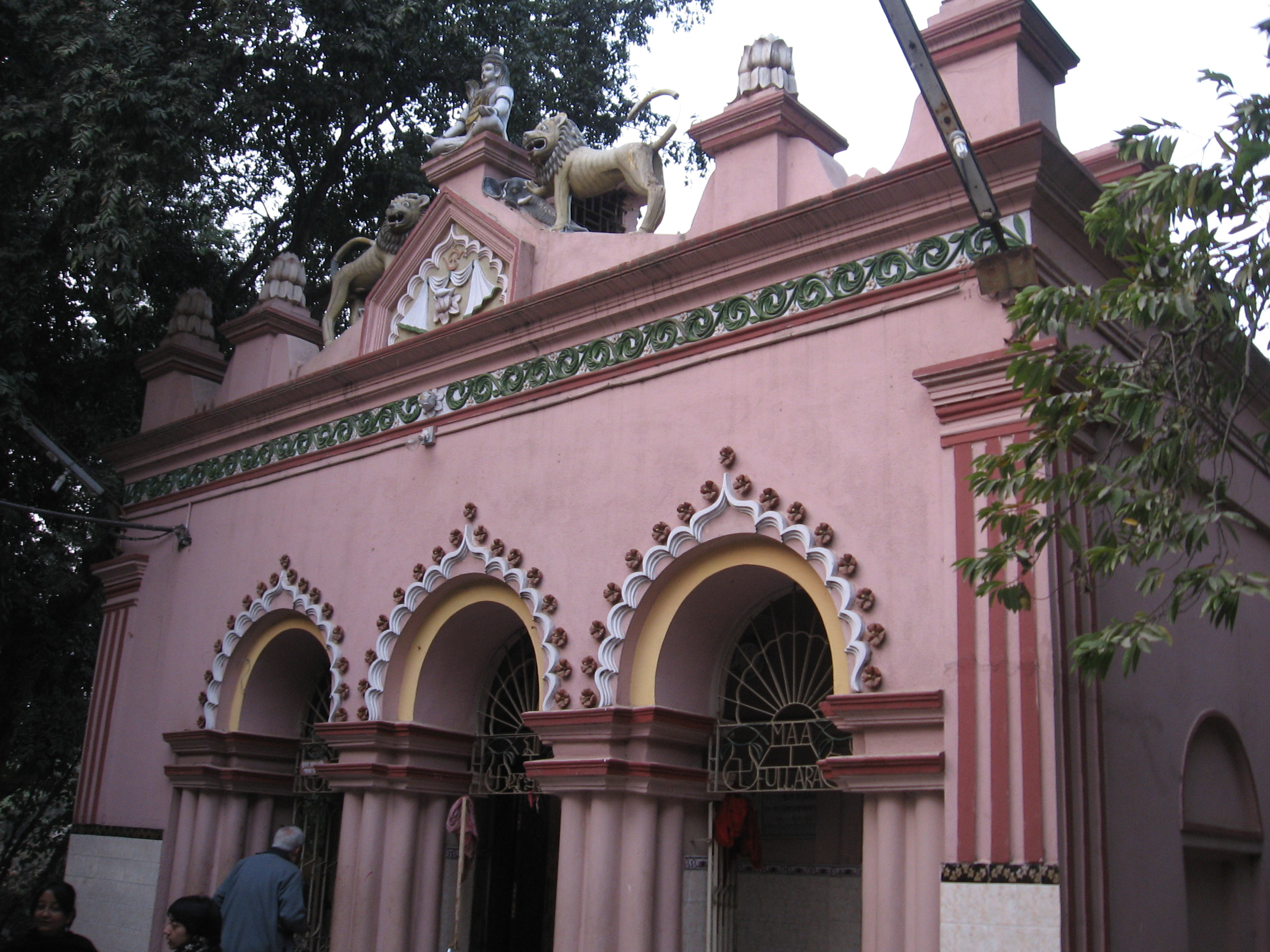
Fullara temple

According to the Hindu mythology, when Mahadeva danced around with Sati's dead body cutting it to pieces, the lower lip fell at Fullara. There is a big pond beside the temple. According to hearsay, Hanuman collected 108 blue lotuses from the pond when Sri Ramachandra required them for the worship of goddess Durga. It is considered to be one of the fifty-one Shakta pithas in India.

== Fair ==
A 10-day fair is organized near Fullara temple during Magh Purnima.

== See also ==
- Attahas Fullora
