= Egyptian Salt and Soda Company Railway =

Egyptian Salt and Soda Co. Railway
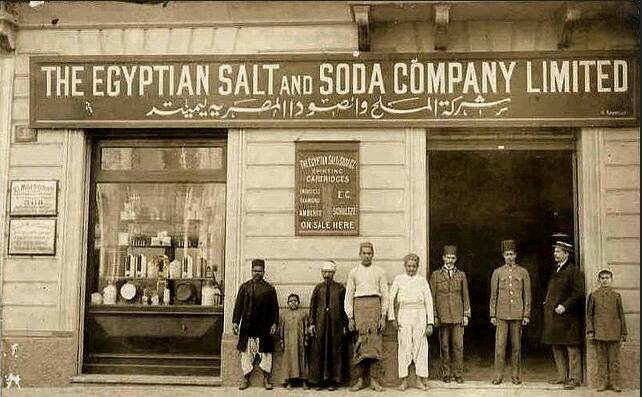
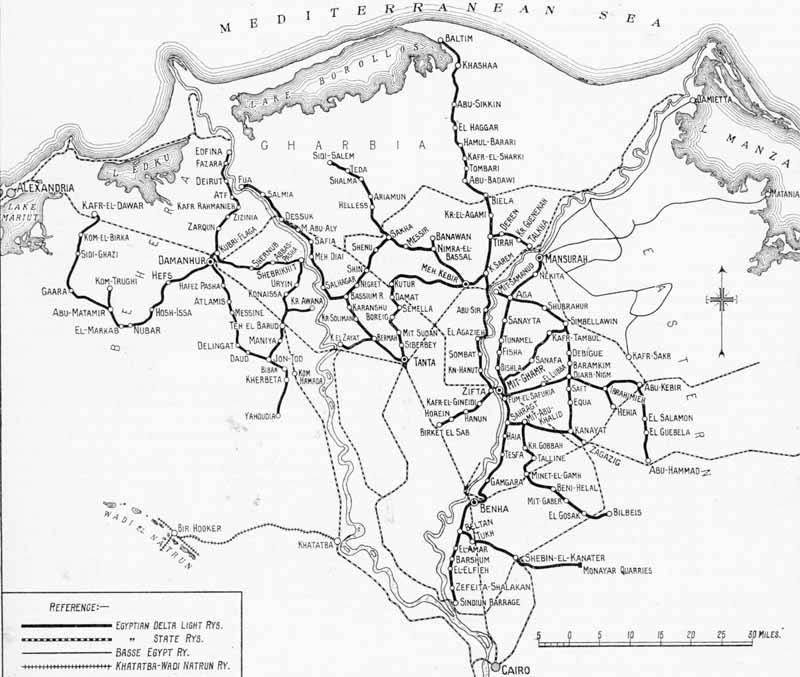
- The Egyptian Salt and Soda Company Limited

Technical
- Line length: 54 km
- Track gauge: 750 mm

The Egyptian Salt and Soda Company Railway was a 33 miles (54 km) long narrow gauge railway with a gauge of 750 mm in Egypt.

== Track ==
The track went from Khataba railway station at the standard gauge Cairo–Damanhur line to Bir Hooker in Wadi Natrun. Thus, it was also known as Khataba-Wadi Natrun R(ailwa)y. According to the Baedeker of 1914, there passenger transport was provided on the line.

== Locomotives and Wagons ==
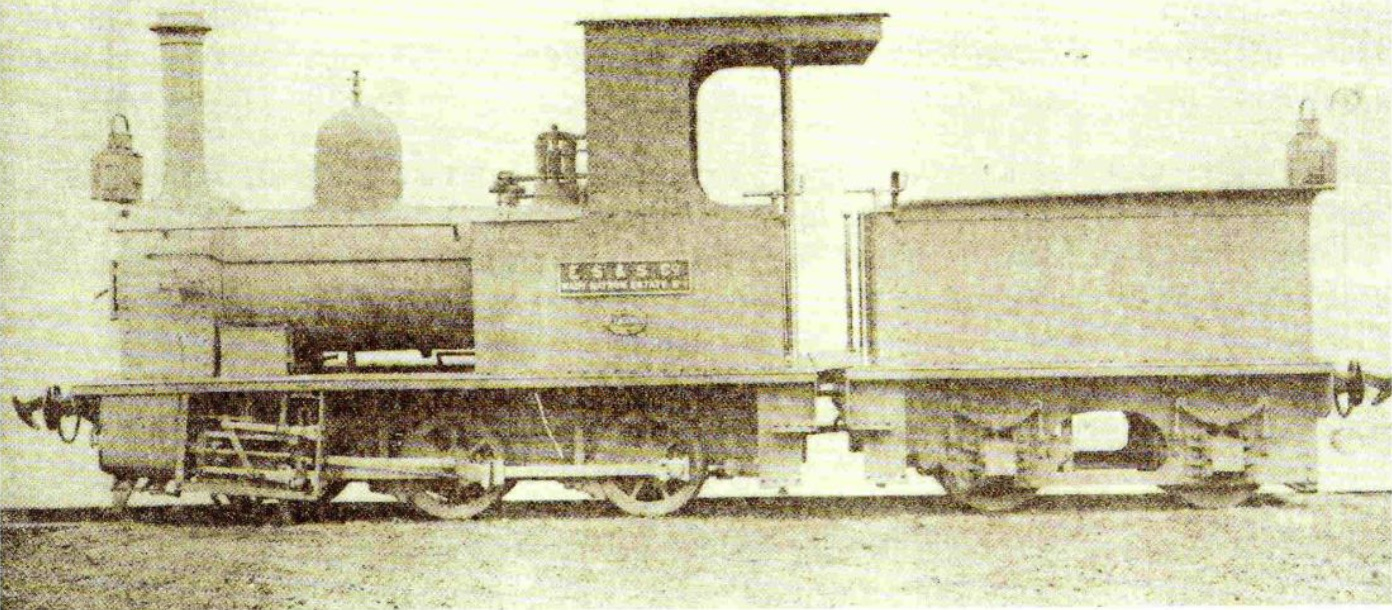
Locomotive of the Egyptian Salt and Soda Company Railway

Three 0-6-0 locomotives were built by the Swiss Locomotive and Machine Works (SLM) in 1898. One 0-4-0WT ex-War-Department locomotive was made by Hunslet. Two Corpet locomotives had been previously used from 1891 to 1902 at the Port Said Railway. Brookville supplied two rail tractors with six wheels each, which were driven by internal combustion engines. A red Orenstein & Koppel worked mainly on the branch to the limestone quarries. From the cab plate of an Aebi engine it is not fully clear, whether it has been built or only delivered by Robert Aebi. One locomotive of Gouillet and one of Rose Downs were also part of the rolling stock. The locomotive pictured is featured in the NGRS publication, THE NARROW GAUGE, Jubilee edition 50, March 1969 with the same photograph. Cabside plates are ES & S CO. Hunslet 756 1901 Despatched 4.7.1901 EGYPTIAN SALT AND SODA CO. Wady Natron Estate No 4. Loco had 8 x 12 outside cylinders and ran on the 75cm gauge. It is a tender version of Cyprus Government Railways number 1 which survives, plinthed at Famagusta.

In 1936, the company owned 3 coaches and 135 goods wagons.
