= Bataspur railway station =

Railway Station in West Bengal

General information
- Location: Dakshin Sija, Kagas, Bataspur, Birbhum district, West Bengal; India
- Coordinates: 23.880279°N 87.680681°E
- Elevation: 54 metres (177 ft)
- System: Indian Railways station
- Owner: Indian Railways
- Line: Bardhaman-Rampurhat section
- Platforms: 2
- Tracks: 2

Construction
- Structure type: Standard (on-ground station)

Other information
- Status: Double-Line Electrification
- Station code: BSLE
- Zone(s): Eastern Railway zone
- Division(s): Howrah

History
- Opened: 1860

Services
Preceding station	Indian Railways	Following station
Sainthia Junction towards Kiul Junction	Eastern Railway zone Sahibganj loop	Ahmadpur Junction towards Khana Junction
Location
- Location within West Bengal Location within India

Bataspur railway station is a railway station on the Bardhaman-Rampurhat Section under Howrah railway division of Eastern Railway zone. It is situated at Dakshin Sija, Kagas, Bataspur in Birbhum district in the Indian state of West Bengal. Total 19 passengers trains stop at Bataspur railway station.
