= Port Said railway station =

Railway station in Egypt

Coordinates: 31.25°N 32.283333°E

Port Said railway station محطة قطار بورسعيد

General information
- Location: 15th of May square, El Sharq district, Port Said Governorate; Egypt
- System: train station
- Owner: Egyptian Railways
- Operator: Egyptian Railways
- Platforms: 8
- Tracks: 8 above ground

Construction
- Parking: yes

History
- Opened: 1893; 133 years ago
- Rebuilt: 1955
Location

Port Said railway station is the main railway terminus in Port Said, Egypt. It is one the main railway stations in the east Nile Delta. It was established in 1893 and inaugurated by of Khedive Abbas Hilmi II linking the cities of Port Said and Ismailia then linking the city to Cairo in 1904, but the current building of the station was built in 1955.

The station is located in 15th of May square, Mustafa Kamal Street, El Sharq district in the city of Port Said, and is owned and operated by the Egyptian Railways, and contains eight train platforms, ticket halls, an outdoor parking lot, administrative offices, a mosque, a restaurant, and several shops.

Port Said Railway Station around 1900.

== See also ==
- Port Said Railway
