= Ahmadpur–Katwa line =

Railway line in India

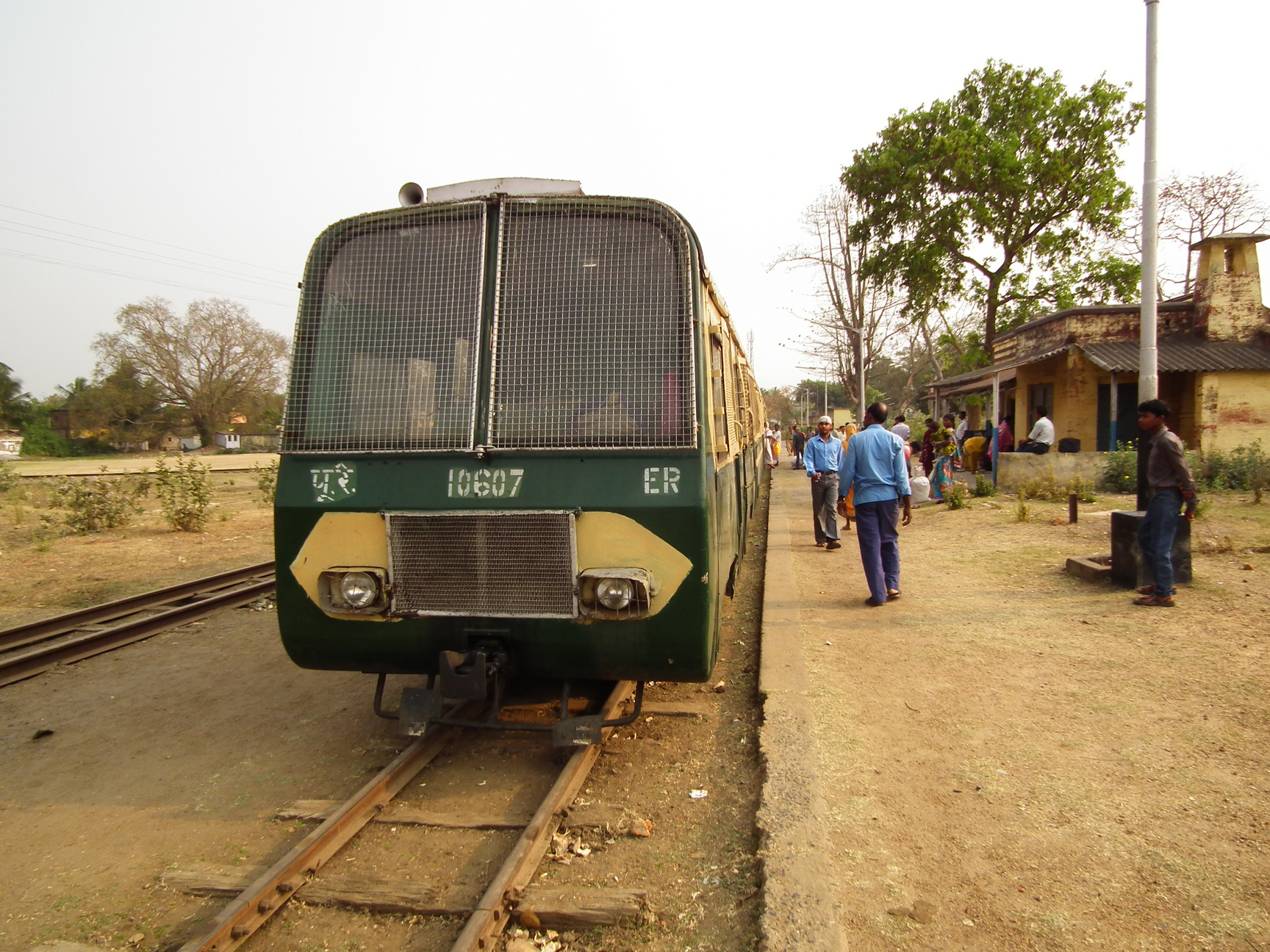
- Railcar No 10607 in March 2012

Overview
- Status: Operational
- Owner: Indian Railways
- Locale: West Bengal
- Termini: Ahmadpur; Katwa
- Stations: 16

Service
- System: Electrified
- Operator(s): 1917-1966 McLeod's Light Railways 1966-present Eastern Railway

History
- Opened: 29 September 1917 (NG) 24 May 2018 (BG)
- Closed: 14 January 2013 (NG)

Technical
- Line length: 52 km (32 mi)
- Track gauge: 5 ft 6 in (1,676 mm) broad gauge
- Old gauge: 2 ft 6 in (762 mm)

The Ahmadpur–Katwa line is a railway branch line connecting Ahmadpur Junction railway station in Birbhum district and Katwa in Purba Bardhaman district of the Indian state of West Bengal. It is under the jurisdiction of the Eastern Railway. This branch is crucial as it connects the Katwa-Bandel-Howrah/Sealdah route with the Khana-Rampurhat section of the Sahibganj loop, bypassing the Barddhaman Station.

== History ==
=== McLeod's Light Railways ===
McLeod's Light Railways (MLR) consisted of four 2 ft 6 in (762 mm) narrow-gauge lines in West Bengal. The railways were built and owned by McLeod & Company, a subsidiary of a London company of managing agents, McLeod Russell & Co. Ltd.

Ahmedpur–Katwa Railway connecting Ahmadpur (now Birbhum district) and Katwa (now Purba Bardhaman district), West Bengal opened on 29 September 1917. The railway was built in 2 ft 6 in (762 mm) gauge and total length was 52 kilometres (32 mi).

The engines chugged along at a maximum speed of 30 km per hour.

In 1966, ownership of the AKR, together with its sister line, the Burdwan–Katwa Railway, was transferred to the Eastern Railway zone of Indian Railways.

=== Gauge conversion ===
This 52 km-long railway section was converted to 1,676 mm (5 ft 6 in) broad gauge, work for which began on 14 January 2013. The line was opened to the public on 24 May 2018.

== Stations between Ahmadpur- Katwa Line ==
- Ahmadpur Junction railway station
- Chowhatta railway station
- Gopalpurgram railway station
- Labpur railway station
- Kirnahar railway station
- Daskalgram railway station
- Kurmodanga railway station
- Jnandas Kandra railway station
- Komarpur railway station
- Nirol railway station
- Pachandi railway station
- Ambalgram railway station
- Nabagram Kankurhati railway station
- Katwa Junction railway station

== Trains ==
This route is served by six local trains that run daily :

- 03037 Katwa - Ahmadpur MEMU special
- 03055 Katwa - Ahmadpur Express special
- 03099 Katwa - Ahmadpur MEMU Special
- 03038 Ahmadpur - Katwa MEMU special
- 03056 Ahmadpur - Katwa Express Special
- 03100 Ahmadpur - Katwa MEMU Special

== See also ==
- Ahmadpur Junction railway station
- Labpur railway station
- Katwa Junction railway station
- Bolpur Shantiniketan railway station
- Rampurhat Junction railway station
