= Egyptian Delta Light Railways =

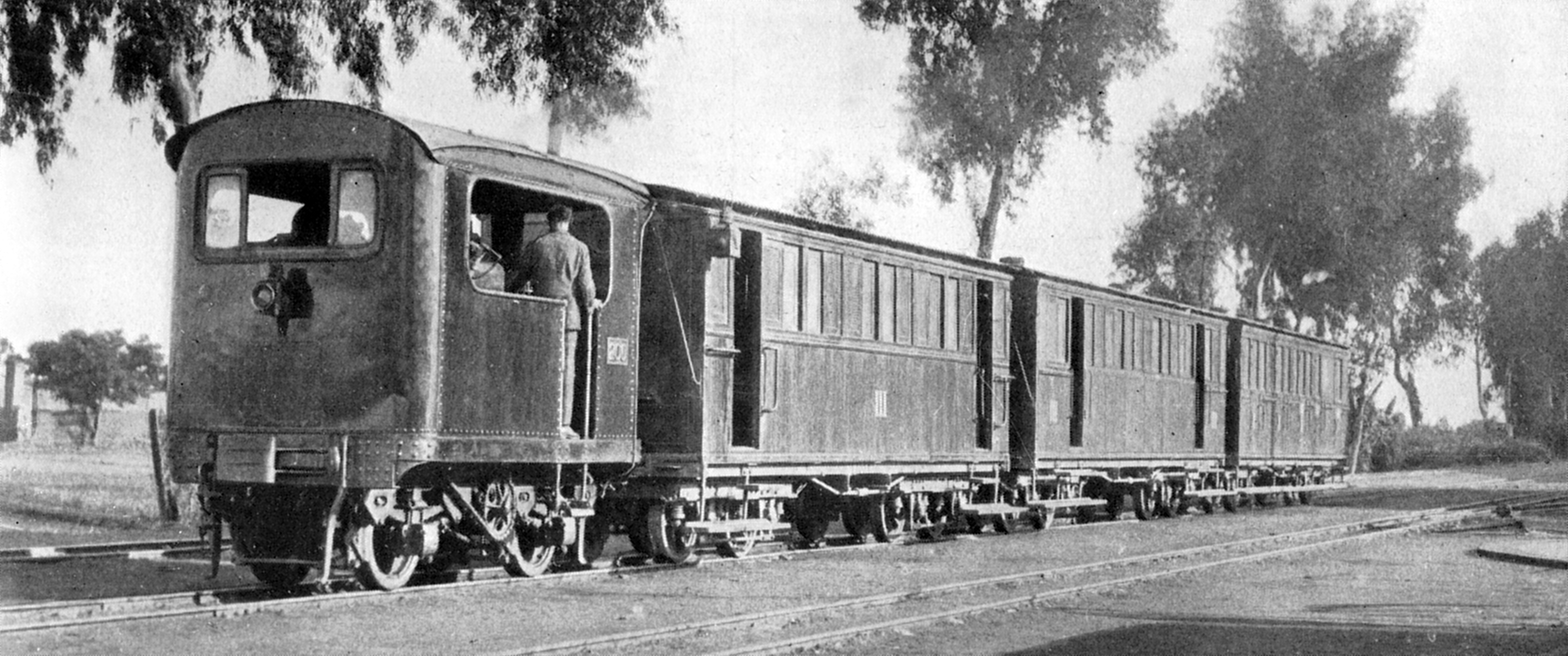
750mm gauge Sentinel locomotive No. 200 on the Egyptian Delta Light Railways, 1920s

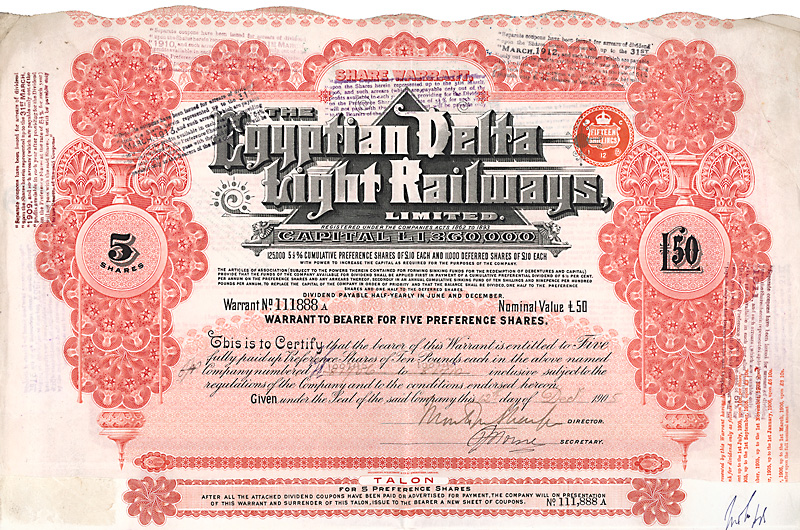
Pref. shares of the Egyptian Delta Light Railways from the 12. December 1905

The Egyptian Delta Light Railways was a 750 mm (2 ft 5 1/2 in) gauge Egyptian narrow gauge railway. It followed on two railway concessions in the Nile Delta granted by the Egyptian government. The first was a monopoly for the construction and exploitation of narrow-gauge agricultural railways in the western and central Nile Delta governorates of El-Behera (Beheira) and Al-Gharbeya (Gharbia) granted to a British company, Messrs. John Birch and Co. Limited, by a concession dated 27 March 1896. These rights were transferred in 1897 to the Société Égyptienne des Chemins de Fer Agricoles, which began construction at Baheira, in 1897 and 1898, of the first 25 kilometres of the network.

In the eastern Nile Delta, the government granted a concession in May 1896 to the Société Egyptienne des Chemins de Fer Agricoles de l’Est. The new company was financed by Austro-Hungarian and German partners. This company’s concession was transferred to the Société des Chemins de Fer Économiques de l’Est Égyptien in 1897.

In 1900, both concessions were bought by a third company, the Egyptian Delta Light Railways Ltd, registered in London, England on 4 March 1897. The new company took over all previous narrow-gauge railway concessions in five governorates: Baheira, to the west of the Rosetta branch of the Nile; Gharbia, in the central Nile Delta; and, to the east of the Damietta branch of the Nile, the more heavily populated governorates of Al-Sharquiyyah (Sharkia), Al-Daqahliyyah (Dakhaliah), and Al-Qalyubiyyah (Kaliouba). Under the new agreement, the Egyptian government retained a right to 40% of profits. The company undertook an obligation to open the completed railway network in all five governorates by April, 1902.

Track, initially 30-pound rail, was laid to a minimum radius of 50 metres on main lines. (Track radius on the eastern network main lines was eventually extended to a minimum of 120 metres.) In the flat land of the Nile Delta, maximum grades were kept to 1 in 150. Construction was slowed by the large number of grave sites that had to be avoided. Cuts up to 11 metres deep were constructed and two tunnels were built, each about 75 metres long, the first in Egypt. Double-track roadbed was 7.08 metres wide; single-track was 4 metres wide. The width of the loading gauge was 2.29 metres. An important characteristic of the network was the large number of swing bridges, 23 in all, over navigable waterways. The longest of these had a swing span of 24 metres. The company built maintenance shops at Damanhour, Mit Ghamr, and Tantah.

The completed railway consisted of a 999 kilometre (620.75 mile) network of lines throughout the Nile Delta region, north of Cairo. The lines were constructed to supplement the 1,435 mm (4 ft 8 1/2 in) standard gauge network, and not all lines were connected: there were in fact three separate networks, including the eastern district to the east of the Damietta branch of the Nile (366 km), the Gharbia district, between the two branches of the Nile (389 km), and Beheira district, to the west of the Rosetta branch of the Nile (244 km).

The railways continued to the post-World War 2 era, but no longer exist.

The first locomotives were 35 W. G. Bagnall 4-4-0T locomotives with the then innovative Baguley valve gear, constructed in 1898; followed by 18 Krauss 2-4-0T and 16 Krauss 0-6-2T in 1900 and 30 Nasmyth, Wilson and Company and North British Locomotive Company 0-6-4T in 1907. In 1916/17 Bagnall supplied 6 2-6-2T “Simla” locomotives. They were also supplied to the Kalighat Falta Railway and the Bankura Damodar Railway in India, where they were known as the "Delta" class. 50 Sentinels were added to the fleet in the mid-1920s, and by 1930 the railway had 129 locomotives. Diesel locomotives also first appeared in the 1930s.

In his authoritative work on Egyptian railways, published in 1932, professor Lionel Wiener maintains that as a result of a downturn in freight traffic caused by a crisis in the cotton industry, as well as competition from vehicular traffic, the Sentinels, which had water-tube boilers as opposed to conventional fire-tube boilers, promised greater efficiency and lower operating costs compared with traditional steam locomotives. It seems likely the Sentinels, in addition to their efficiency, were purchased because the company needed extra motive power to cope with a surge in passenger traffic. Data presented by Wiener shows that this almost doubled in the last half of the 1920s, from 6.5 million in 1925 to over 12 million in 1930. Wiener notes that in 1932 the railway had 291 passenger cars, including first and third-class coaches and mail cars. In 1936, the company owned 128 locomotives, 350 coaches and 1471 goods wagons.

On the other hand, the railway’s main sources of freight traffic, construction materials and especially agricultural freight (cotton and cereal crops), fluctuated or remained stagnant compared to pre-WWI levels. Despite the fact that overall agricultural output may have stagnated, by 1930 cotton production had returned to its former levels as the crisis in the cotton industry – poorly drained soil subject to overirrigation - was addressed.
