= Labhpur =

- Census Town
- Location in West Bengal, India Labhpur (India)
- Coordinates: 23.83°N 87.82°E
- Country: India
- State: West Bengal
- District: Birbhum
- Elevation: 35 m (115 ft)

Population (2011)
  - Total: 5,419

Languages
  - Official: Bengali, English
- Time zone: UTC+5:30 (IST)
- PIN: 731303
- Telephone code: 03463
- Vehicle registration: WB
- Sex ratio: 944 ♂/♀
- Lok Sabha constituency: Bolpur
- Vidhan Sabha constituency: Labpur
- Website: birbhum.nic.in

Labhpur is a census town in Labpur, a community development block in Bolpur subdivision of Birbhum district in the Indian state of West Bengal. It is the hometown of novelist Tarashankar Bandopadhyay and is one of the 51 Shakta pithas.

== Geography ==
Cities and towns in Bolpur subdivision of Birbhum district
M: municipal city/ town, CT: census town, R: rural/ urban centre, U: University.
Owing to space constraints in the small map, the actual locations in a larger map may vary slightly

=== Location ===
Labpur is located at 23.83°N 87.82°E. It has an average elevation of 35 m (115 ft).

Note: The map alongside presents some of the notable locations in the area. All places marked in the map are linked in the larger full screen map.

It lies in the flood plains of Mayurakshi River and when water is released from Massanjore dam and Tilpara barrage in large quantities, flood waters wreak havoc in the area. In 2006, nearly 50,000 people were marooned in Labhpur and surrounding blocks of Birbhum district.

== Demographics ==
As per the 2011 Census of India, Labhpur had a total population of 5,419 of which 2,762 (51%) were males and 2,657 (49%) were females. Population below 6 years was 443. The total number of literates in Labhpur was 4,193 (84.26% of the population over 6 years).

== Infrastructure ==
As per the District Census Handbook 2011, Labhpur covered an area of 2.1069 km^{2}.

== College ==
- Sambhunath College, Labhpur. (Estd. 1963)

== Culture ==
=== Tarashankar country ===
Tarashankar Bandopadhyay, the Bengali writer, was born at Labhpur on 23 July 1898. He passed matriculation from Labhpur in 1916. Many of his novels and stories carry vivid descriptions of the area.

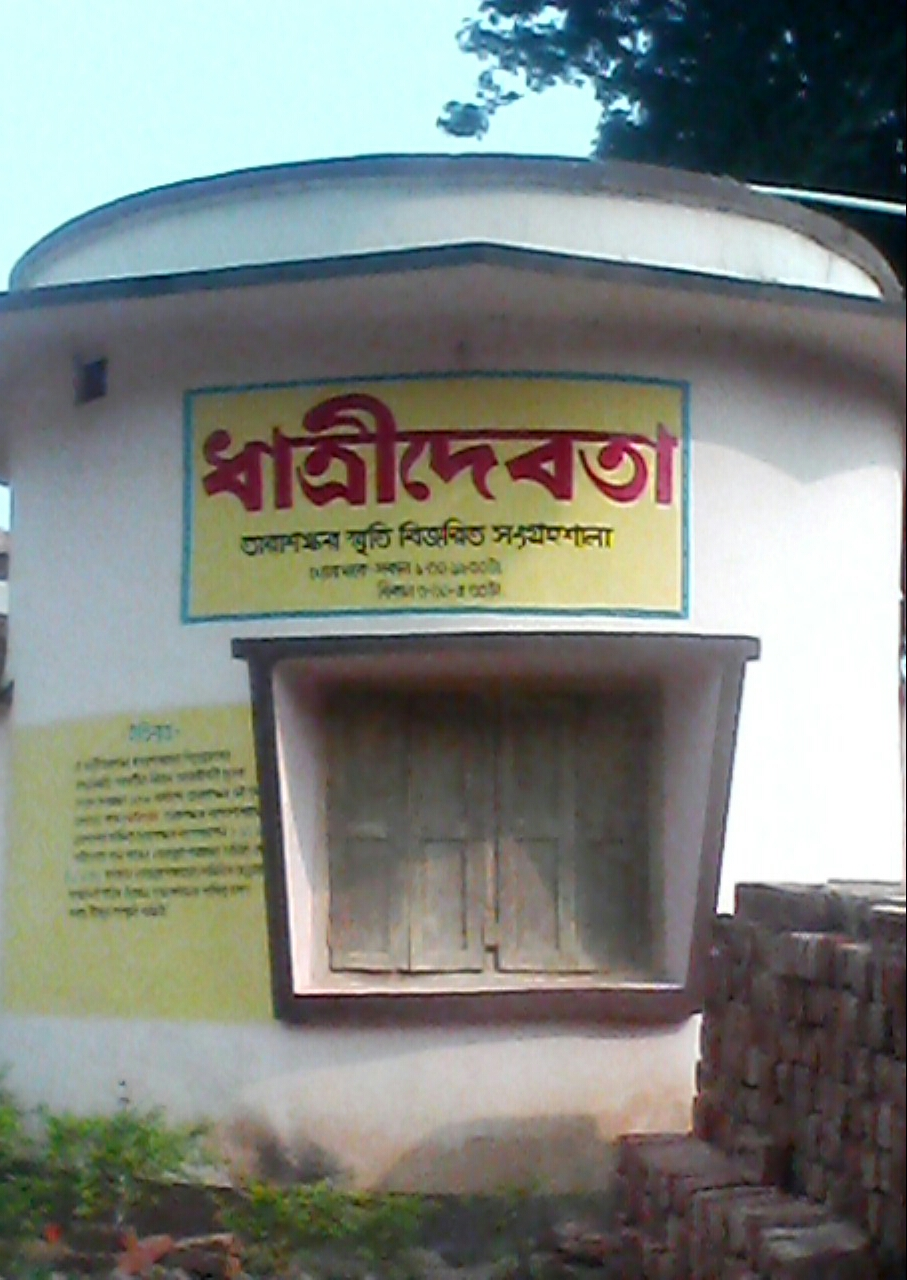
House of Tarashankar Bandopadhyaya

In the novel Hansulibanker Upkatha, he writes, "The Hansulibank countryside is somewhat rough land. Here, man’s fight is more with land, than that with rivers. When drought comes, in extreme summer, the river becomes a desert, it is a land of sand – only deep water somehow manages to weave a narrow way through it. The land then is transformed into rock. The grass dries up. The land heats up as if it is a piece of heated-up iron."

In his novel Ganadevata, he quotes a rural rhyme

Poush-Poush, golden Poush,
Come Poush but don’t go away, don’t ever leave,
Don’t leave Poush, Don’t,
The husband and son will eat a full bowl of rice.

== Notable people ==
- Tarasankar Bandyopadhyay, novelist
- Pranab Mukherjee, president of India

== See also ==
- Labhpur travel guide from Wikivoyage
- Labpur railway station
- Ahmadpur–Katwa line
