= Magha Purnima =

Full moon in the Hindu calendar month of Magh

Maghi Purnima, also known as Magha Purnima, is the full moon day of the Hindu calendar month of Magha. It falls in January or February in the Gregorian calendar. During this time period, the Kumbh Mela is held every twelve years, and the Magh Mela is held on an annual basis at the confluence of three rivers or Triveni Sangam all around north India.

== Kaaw Punim ==
Kashmiri Hindus of Jammu and Kashmir celebrate this day as Kaaw Punim (lit. 'Purnima of the crow'), where they offer rice to crows as prasad. Gangabal Lake, a high-altitude Himalayan glacial lake, is invoked during the rituals of Kaw Punim.

== See also ==
- Basant Panchmi
