= Ahmadpur Junction railway station =

Railway Station in West Bengal

Ahmadpur Junction আহমদপুর জংশন
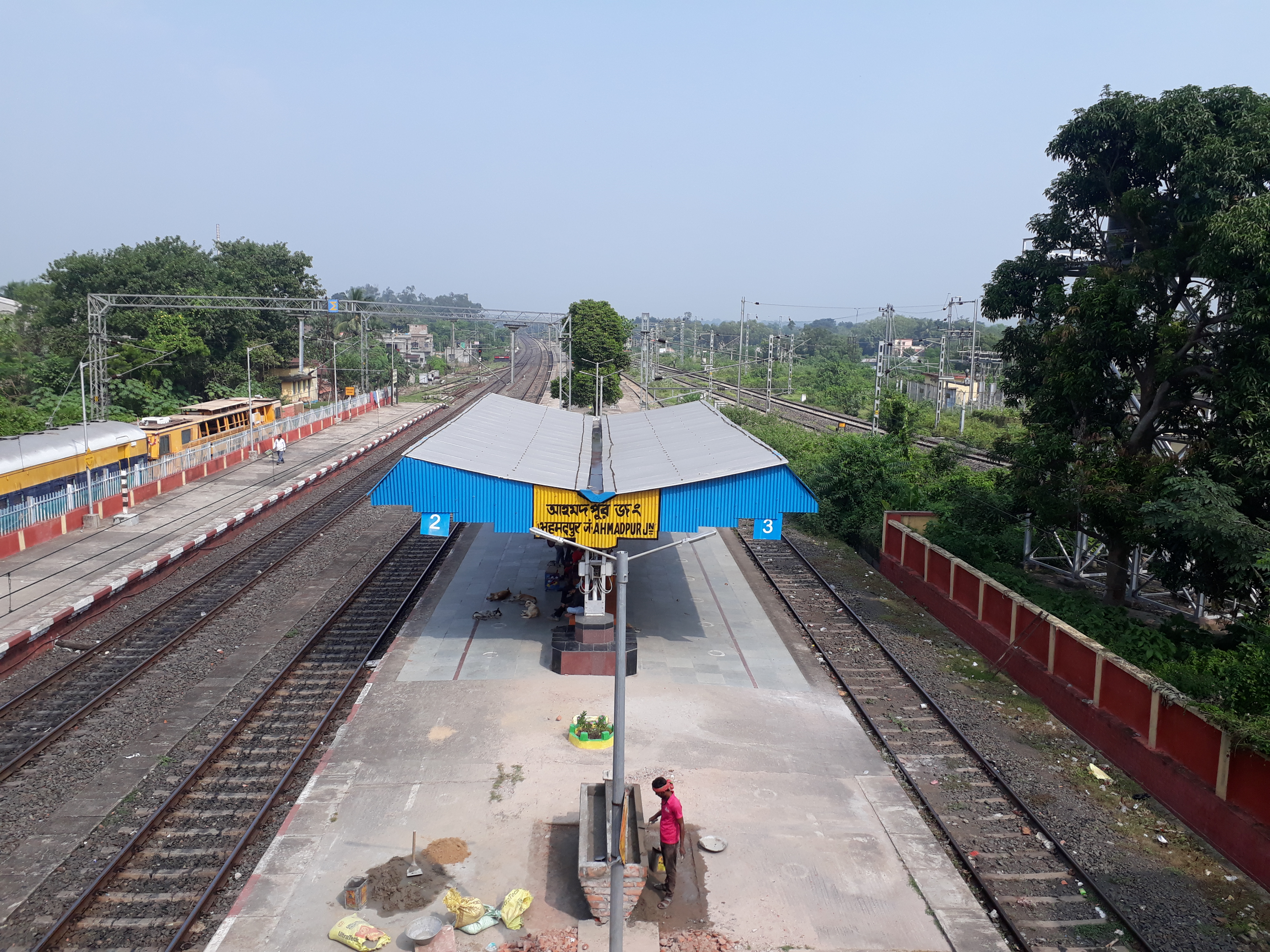

General information
- Location: Suri road, Ahmedpur, Birbhum district, West Bengal; India
- Coordinates: 23.832509°N 87.692841°E
- Elevation: 47 metres (154 ft)
- System: Indian Railways station
- Owner: Indian Railways
- Lines: Bardhaman-Rampurhat section Ahmadpur–Katwa line
- Platforms: 5
- Tracks: 5

Construction
- Structure type: At grade

Other information
- Status: Double-Line Electrification
- Station code: AMP
- Zone(s): Eastern Railway
- Division(s): Howrah

History
- Opened: 1860

Services
Preceding station	Indian Railways	Following station
Kopai towards Khana	Eastern Railway zone Sahibganj loop	Bataspur towards Kiul Junction
Terminus	Eastern Railway zone Ahmadpur–Katwa line	Chowhatta towards ?
Location
- Location within West Bengal Location within India

Ahmadpur Junction railway station is an important junction railway station on the Bardhaman-Rampurhat Section under Howrah railway division of Eastern Railway zone. It is the connecting station of Sahibganj loop line and Ahmadpur–Katwa line. It is situated beside Suri road at Ahmedpur in Birbhum district in the Indian state of West Bengal. Total 33 trains stop at Ahmadpur Junction railway station.

== Trains ==
Major Trains available from this railway station are as follows:

- Sealdah-Alipurduar Kanchan Kanya Express
- Sealdah-Bamanhat Uttar Banga Express
- Sealdah–Silchar Kanchenjunga Express
- Howrah-Azimganj Ganadevata Express
- Howrah–Malda Town Intercity Express
- Sealdah–Agartala Kanchenjunga Express
- Howrah–Rampurhat Express
- Howrah–Azimganj Kavi Guru Express

The station currently originates eight trains and terminates eight others daily, including:

- 03037 Katwa - Ahmadpur MEMU special
- 03055 Katwa - Ahmadpur Express special
- 03099 Katwa - Ahmadpur MEMU Special
- 35041 Katwa - Ahmadpur EMU Passenger
- 03038 Ahmadpur - Katwa MEMU special
- 03056 Ahmadpur - Katwa Express Special
- 03100 Ahmadpur - Katwa MEMU Special
- 35042 Ahmadpur - Katwa EMU Passenger

List of Trains that Not Restored Yet

- 13013/14 Rampurhat - Bardhaman Triweekly Express
- 13119/20 Sealdah - Anvt Upper India Express (2 Days a week)
- 13133/34 Sealdah - Varanasi Upper India Express (5 Days a week)
- 53043/44 Howrah - Rajgir Fast Passenger (Daily)
- 53417/18 Bardhaman - Malda Town Passenger (Daily)

== See also ==
- Ahmedpur, Birbhum
- Sainthia Junction railway station
- Bolpur Shantiniketan railway station
- Rampurhat Junction railway station
- List of railway stations in India
