= Katwa Junction railway station =

Railway Station in West Bengal, India

Katwa Junction
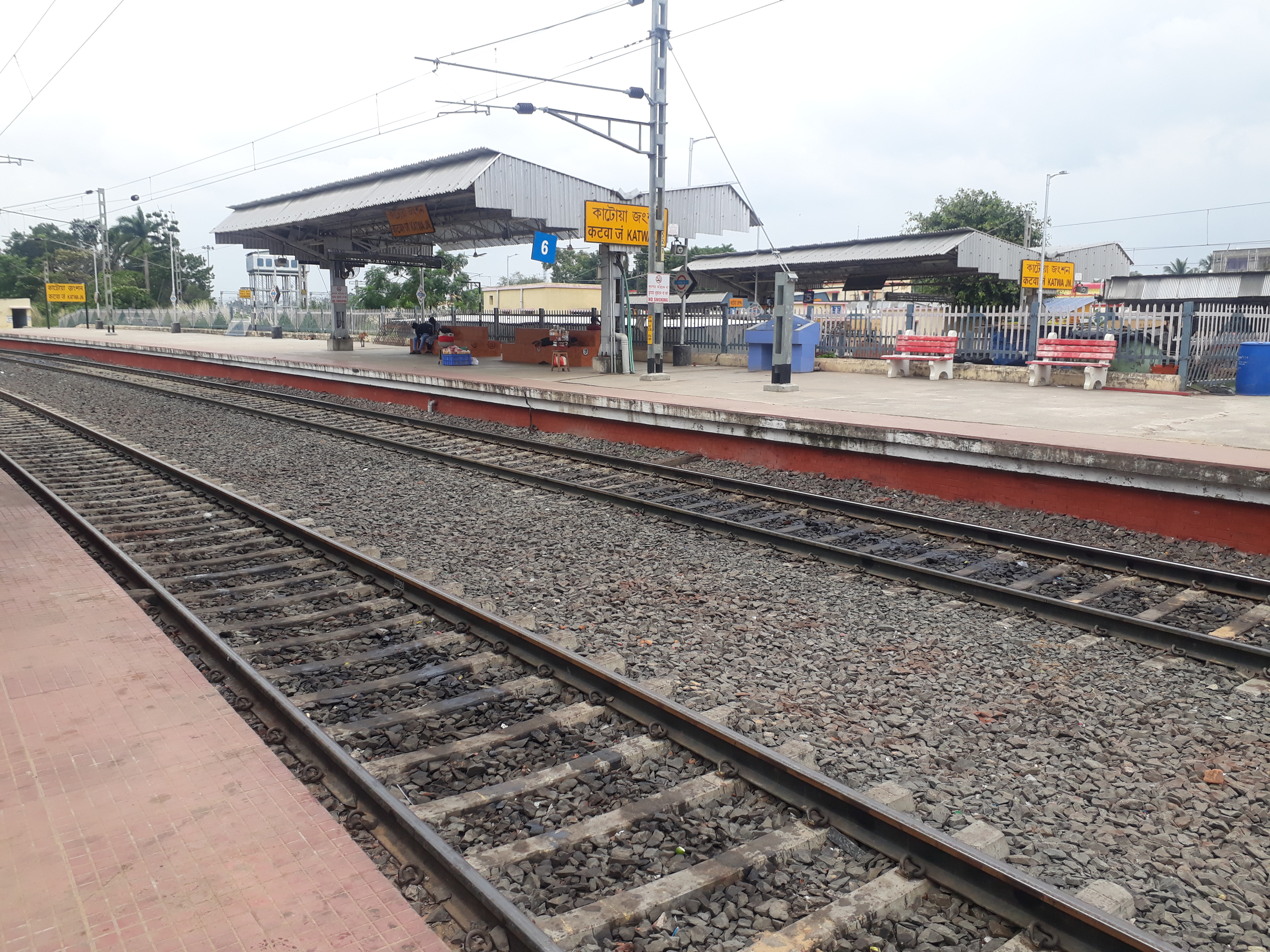
- Katwa Junction railway station

General information
- Location: Station Road, 14 kuthir, Circus Maidan, Katwa, Purba Bardhaman, West Bengal; India
- Coordinates: 23°38′24″N 88°07′27″E
- Elevation: 16.077 m (52.75 ft)
- System: Kolkata Suburban Railway, passenger train and express train junction station
- Owner: Indian Railways
- Operator: Eastern Railway
- Lines: Howrah-NJP Loop Line; Bandel–Katwa line; Barharwa–Azimganj–Katwa loop; Bardhaman–Katwa line; Ahmadpur–Katwa line
- Platforms: 7
- Tracks: 7

Construction
- Structure type: At grade
- Parking: for 2 and 4 four wheeler
- Cycle facilities: Yes
- Accessible: Yes

Other information
- Status: Functioning
- Station code: KWAE
- Zone(s): Eastern Railway
- Division(s): Howrah

History
- Opened: 1913
- Electrified: 1994–96 with 25 kV overhead line
- Former names: East Indian Railway Company
Location
- Location within West Bengal Location within India

Katwa railway station is a Kolkata Suburban Railway Junction Station on the Howrah–Bandel-Nabadwip Dham–Katwa line, Barharwa–Azimganj–Katwa and the Howrah–New Jalpaiguri line. It is located in Purba Bardhaman district in the Indian state of West Bengal. It serves Katwa and the surrounding areas.

== History ==
In 1913, the Hooghly–Katwa Railway constructed a 5 ft 6 in (1,676 mm) broad gauge line from Bandel to Katwa, and the Barharwa–Azimganj–Katwa Railway constructed the 5 ft 6 in (1,676 mm) broad gauge Barharwa–Azimganj–Katwa loop.

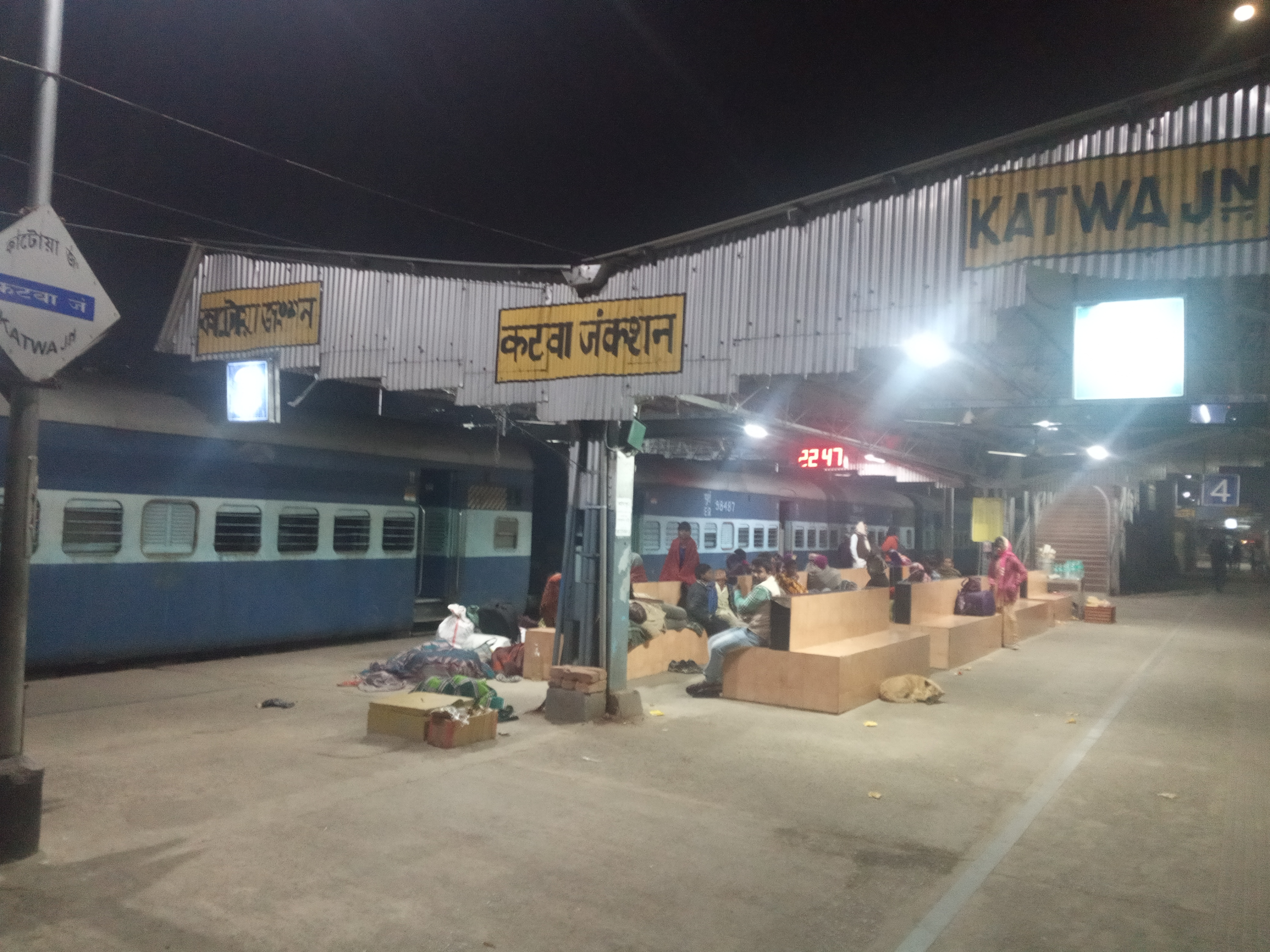
Katwa Junction

The 53 km (33 mi)-long 762 mm (2 ft 6 in)-wide narrow-gauge Burdwan–Katwa Railway was opened in 1915 as part of McLeod's Light Railways, taken over by Eastern Railway in 1966 and closed in 2010.

The 53 km (33 mi)-long 762 mm (2 ft 6 in)-wide narrow-gauge Ahmedpur–Katwa Railway was opened in 1917 as part of McLeod's Light Railways and taken over by Eastern Railway in 1966. It was closed in 2013 for conversion to 5 ft 6 in (1,676 mm) broad gauge and electrification.

== Gauge conversion ==
The Bardhaman–Katwa line, after conversion from narrow gauge to electrified broad gauge, was opened to the public on 12 January 2018. Additionally, the Ahmedpur-Katwa railway line, converted from narrow gauge to electrified broad gauge, was inaugurated for public use on May 24, 2018.

== Electrification ==
Electrification of the Bandel–Katwa line was completed with 25 kV AC overhead system in 1994–96.

== Narrow-gauge travel ==
Here is a description of narrow-gauge travel (now closed):

The land west of the Hooghly, though still alluvial and flat, is not as wet as riverine Bengal. Its fields, though usually covered with close-cropped green grass, bear but one crop a year and lie open, instead of being divided by watercourses and frequent villages. Altogether they do nothing to prevent the BK Railway from following a straight surveyed line, or to stop its trains from traveling at an even pace marked by the measured clunking of four-wheeled carriages on rail joints. My train from Burdwan stopped regularly, sometimes to shunt or to cross a southbound service. At each station the passenger load increased, so that after two stops the man opposite had to give up sleeping on the seat, and after several more there were fowls underfoot and small boys and women sitting on the floor and young men hanging on while standing on the footboards. So we rounded the curve into Katwa – doors open, dhotis flapping, all bound for Katwa market. A secondary main line of the Eastern Railway also passes through Katwa, the headquarters of the two narrow-gauge lines being alongside its station. Their loco shed had several more Bagnalls and, among others, a 0-6-0 Simplex or two. In company days each engine was owned by the BK or AK but used on either line – I dare say it all came out in the accounts. Another pleasing feature of McLeod's accountancy was that the second class fare was only 20% above the third and the first that much again, instead of the 1:2 ratio preferred by the government. This meant that I could afford second class to Ahmadpur – the seedy red cushion on the seat was not worth it, but the lessened crowd was. This train left from No. 2 road of McLeod's station (never mind that it had no platform) and wasted no time in making arrangements to run third-rail along the East Indian broad gauge for the first few miles out from Katwa, in order to share a bridge over one of the sluggish anabranches that meandered over the plain. Once AK was on its independent way, the regular jolting of the carriages combined with the monotonous scenery to induce sleepiness in all the passengers and perhaps the train itself. Matters were not helped by the Bengal midday, with the sunlight diffused by a high mist and yet stifling us with heat.

== See also ==
- Katwa
- Barharwa–Azimganj–Katwa loop
- Bardhaman–Katwa line
- Ahmadpur–Katwa line
- Barddhaman Junction railway station
- Bandel Junction railway station
- Rampurhat Junction railway station
- List of railway stations in India

Preceding station	Indian Railways	Following station
Terminus	Eastern Railway zone Barharwa–Azimganj–Katwa loop	Nabagram Kankurhati towards Barharwa Junction
Terminus	Eastern Railway zone Ahmadpur–Katwa line	Nabagram Kankurhati towards ?
Preceding station	Kolkata Suburban Railway	Following station
Shripat Shrikhanda towards Howrah Junction	Eastern Line Bardhaman–Katwa line	Terminus
Dainhat towards Howrah Junction	Eastern Line Bandel–Katwa line	Terminus
