= Ahmedpur, Birbhum =

Ahmedpur Amodpur
- Census Town
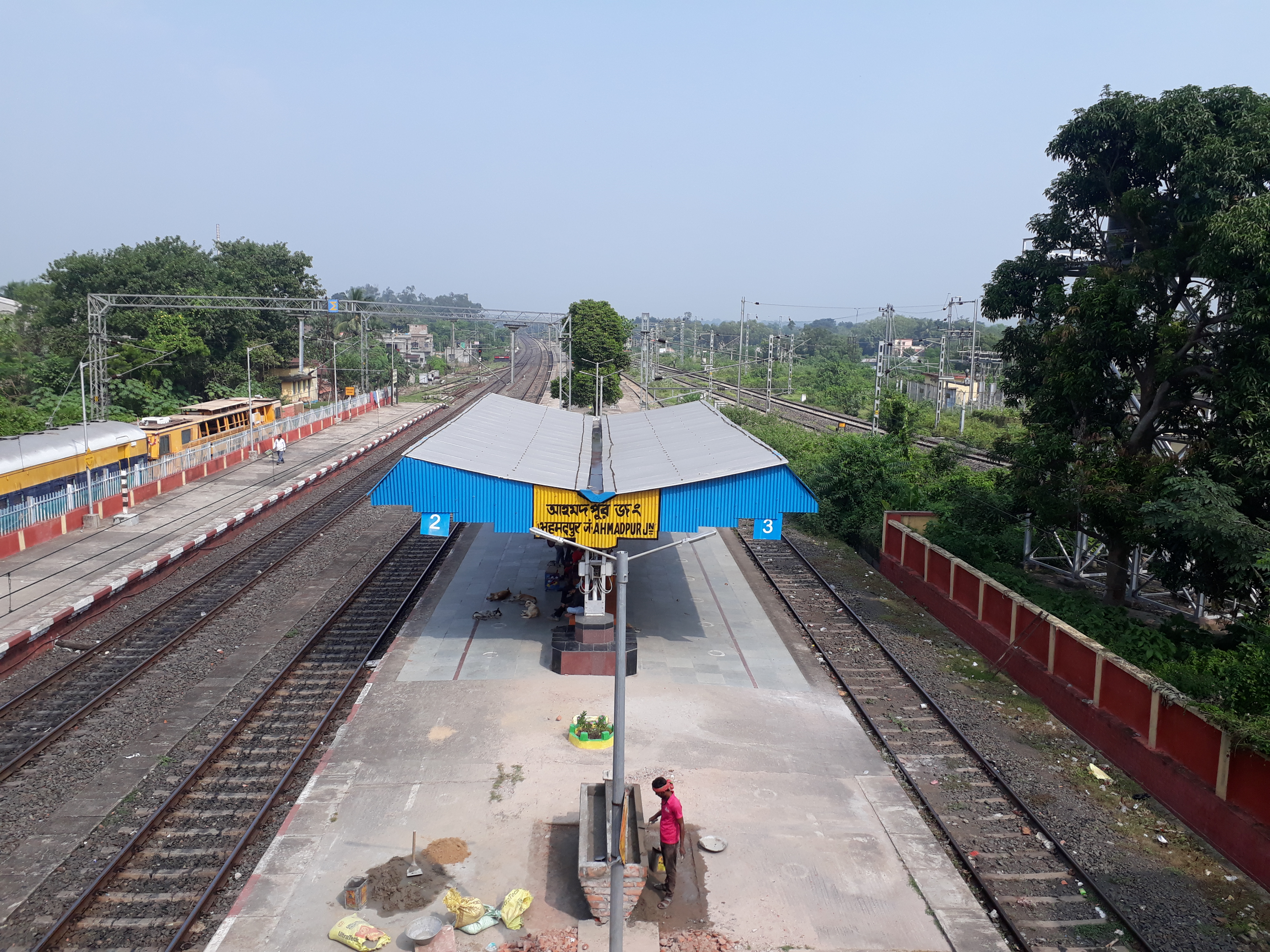
- Ahmadpur railway station

- Location in West Bengal, India Ahmedpur (India)
- Coordinates: 23.8365°N 87.6912°E
- Country: India
- State: West Bengal
- District: Birbhum
- Police station: Sainthia

Area
  - Total: 1.3 km^{2} (0.50 sq mi)

Population (2011)
  - Total: 9,242
  - Density: 7,100/km^{2} (18,000/sq mi)

Languages
  - Official: Bengali, English
- Time zone: UTC+5:30 (IST)
- PIN: 731201
- Telephone code: 03463
- ISO 3166 code: IN-WB
- Vehicle registration: WB
- Lok Sabha constituency: Bolpur
- Vidhan Sabha constituency: Labpur
- Website: birbhum.nic.in

Ahmedpur is a census town in Sainthia CD block in Suri Sadar subdivision of Birbhum district in the Indian state of West Bengal. Ahmedpur is under the jurisdiction of Sainthia police station. The census town is remembered in the area for its sugar mill and as one end of the vintage narrow gauge railway. The office of the Block Development Officer, Sainthia Block is situated here, adjacent to the Ahmedpur railway station. It hosts a growing local business centre, being well connected with Kolkata and other cities of West Bengal via railway.

== Geography ==
Cities and towns in Suri Sadar subdivision of Birbhum district
M: municipal city/ town, CT: census town, R: rural/ urban centre, B: Barrage.
Owing to space constraints in the small map, the actual locations in a larger map may vary slightly

=== Location ===
Ahmedpur is located in the alluvial plain of the Bakreswar River. It has hot and dry summers, spread between March and May, followed by the monsoon from June to September. Seventy-eight percent of the rainfall occurs during this period. Although large trees are rare, small and medium vegetation, with short grass and bushes can be found alongside the road.

== Demographics ==
As per the 2011 Census of India, Ahmadpur had a total population of 9,242 of which 4,697 (51%) were males and 4,545 (49%) were females. Population below 6 years was 969. The total number of literates in Ahmadpur was 6,722 (81.25% of the population over 6 years).

== Infrastructure ==
As per the District Census Handbook 2011, Ahmedpur covered an area of 1.61 km^{2}. There is a railway station is at Ahmedpur. Buses are available in the town. It has 10 km roads and both open and closed drains. The major source of protected water supply is from bore well pumping and over head tank. There are 1,083 domestic electric connections and 14 road light points. Amongst the medical facilities it has are 1 hospital with 40 beds and 13 medicine shops. Amongst the educational facilities it has are 7 primary schools, 3 middle schools, 3 secondary schools and 2 senior secondary schools. Amongst the social, recreational and cultural facilities there are 1 working women's hostel, 1 cinema theatre, 1 auditorium/ community hall, 1 public library and 1 reading room. It has the branches of 2 nationalised banks, 1 cooperative bank and 1 agricultural credit society. Amongst the commodities it produces are rice and mustard oil.

== Economy ==
The West Bengal government purchased the assets of the National Sugar Mills through a court sale on 4 June 1973 during its liquidation, enabling the West Bengal Sugar Industries Development Corporation. On 1 September 1973, it was renamed Ahmedpur Sugar Mill. It went into production in the 1974–75 season. This sugar mill has not been functioning for around 7–8 years.

Another traditional industry is rice milling. Ahmedpur has a number of rice mills, some of which date from the pre-independence era. Ahmedpur also has the oldest Solvent Extraction Plant for Rice Bran Oil in West Bengal. Apart from the sugar mill there is also one wine processing factory.

== Transport ==
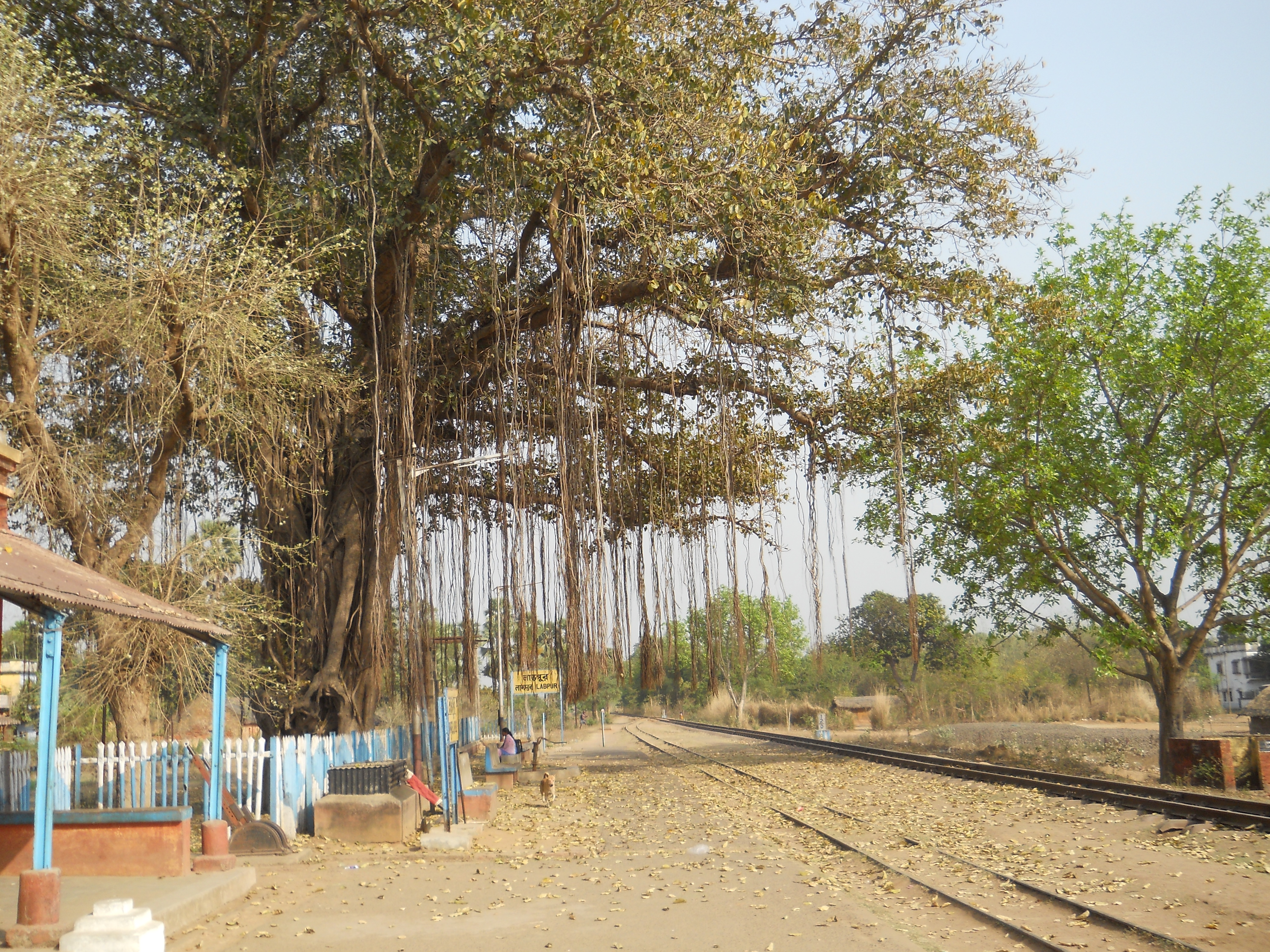
Katwa to Ahmedpur Narrow gauge railway line

Ahmadpur Junction railway station is situated on the Bardhaman – Sainthia section of Sahibganj Loop. The 52 km long narrow gauge (2' 6") Ahmedpur Katwa Railway terminates in Ahmedpur. Four pairs of trains run daily in the section. It has remained a single line since its opening. Indian Railways took over the narrow gauge tracks between Katwa and Ahmedpur, and Katwa and Bardhaman from McLoyd and Company in 1966. The railways have identified low passenger numbers and unwillingness to buy tickets as the reasons behind the losses incurred by the narrow gauge section. The section has not been functioning for the last few years and the whole Ahmedpur-Katwa stretch is currently being converted to the broad gauge line. Nowadays the authority decided to turn this section off. The authority decided to make broad gauge railway instead of this narrow gauge. Construction of the new railway is currently underway. In a few days, passengers can enjoy a better railway service here. Now the conversion from narrow gauge to broad gauge is completed and also overhead electrification is done. On 22 November 2017 a trial journey took place from Ahmedpur to Katwa.

== Education ==
Ahmedpur has government-aided higher-secondary schools for boys and girls, as well as primary co-education schools. The Jai Durga High School & Ramkrishna high school are the main school for boys in the region, situated close to the station. Students from the neighboring villages are often seen admitted to the government schools here. Proximity and good connectivity to Burdwan encourages many students to attend the University of Burdwan. Many college students from here travel to nearby village Labhpur to attend the Labhpur Shambhunath college and also travel to Sainthia to attend the Abhedananda Mahavidyalaya. Recently three B.Ed. and Basic Training Colleges were established at Ahmedpur.
