= McLeod's Light Railways =

Private railway company

Overview
- Owner: McLeod's Light Railways
- Locale: West Bengal

Service
- Operator: McLeod's Light Railways
- Depot(s): Kalighat, Falta, Burdwan, Katwa, Ahmadpur, Bankura,

History
- Opened: 1915–1917

Technical
- Line length: 245.3 km (152 mi)
- Track length: 245.3 km (152 mi)
- Track gauge: 2 ft 6 in (762 mm)
- Operating speed: NG 36 kilometres per hour (22 mph). BG 100 kilometres per hour (62 mph)

McLeod's Light Railways (MLR) consisted of following four 2 ft 6 in (762 mm) narrow-gauge lines in West Bengal in India. The railways were built and owned by McLeod & Company, which was the subsidiary of a London company of managing agents, McLeod Russell & Co. Ltd. On 1 July 1967, the Bankura Damodar Railway was merged with South Eastern Railway.

== Ahmedpur–Katwa Railway ==
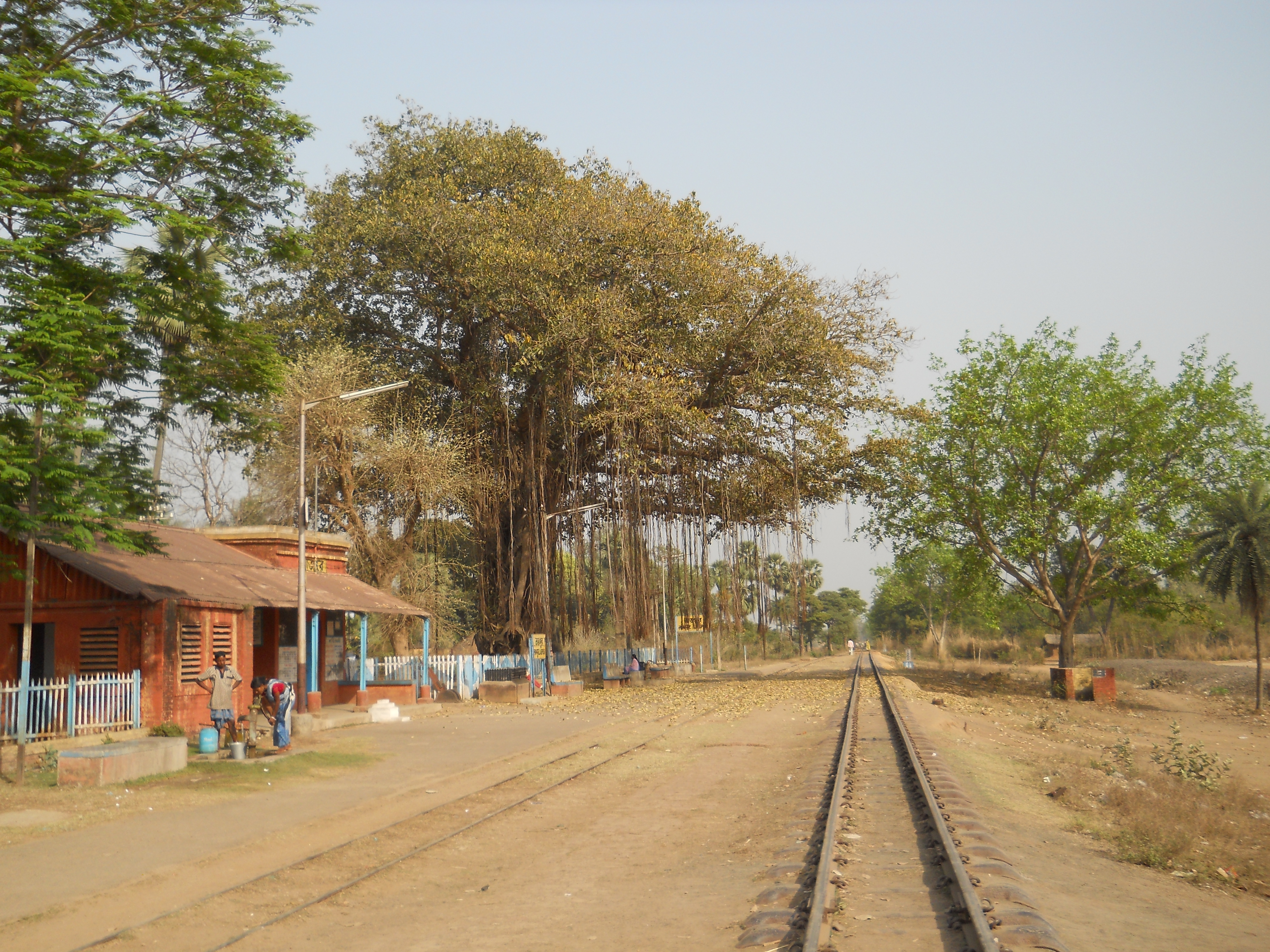
Ahmedpur–Katwa Railway at Labhpur

Ahmedpur–Katwa Railway connecting Ahmedpur and Katwa in West Bengal was opened to traffic on 29 September 1917. The railway was built in 2 ft 6 in (762 mm) gauge and total length was 52 kilometres (32 mi). In 1966, Indian Railways had taken over the operation of this narrow gauge railway from McLeod & Company.

The 52 km long railway section has been converted to 1,676 mm (5 ft 6 in) broad gauge. The conversion work started in 2013 and was completed in early 2017. On 24 May 2018, the section was opened to passenger traffic.

== Bankura–Damodar Railway ==
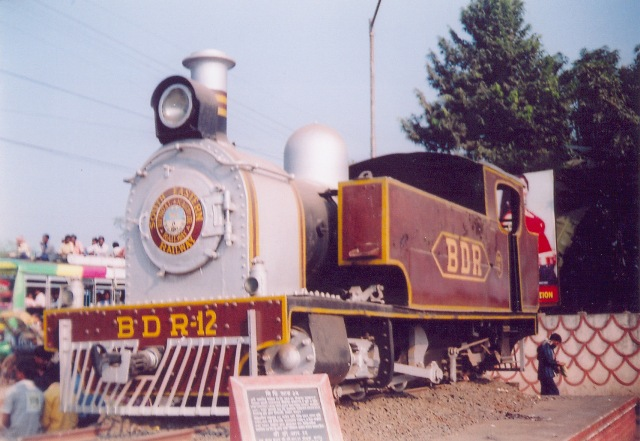
Narrow-gauge loco plinthed at Bankura railway station

Bankura–Damodar Railway (also called as Bankura Damodar River Railway) connecting Bankura and Rainagar in Bankura and Bardhaman districts in now West Bengal was opened to traffic in sections between 15 December 1916 and 6 June 1917. The railway was built in 2 ft 6 in (762 mm) gauge and total length was 97 kilometres (60 mi). The railway was known as Bankura Damodar Railway, as it used to terminate at Rainagar, which was on banks of Damodar River. People used to take ferries to cross river to go on other side.

The standard locomotive for BDR was a powerful 0-6-4T design from W. G. Bagnall of Stafford, but during the First World War some 2-6-2T engines were also obtained from Bagnall, same as was ordered for the Egyptian Delta Light Railways (and hence known as the Delta class). The 1953 additions were also of this type. There were two Sentinel locomotives; one (No.8) is now preserved at the National Rail Museum, New Delhi. A steam loco shed at Bankura served the narrow gauge line.

The BDR services were withdrawn in 1995 after it incurred huge losses due to higher maintenance costs, falling passenger numbers as well as falling freight. In 2005, the 120.3 kilometres (74.8 mi) long railway section was converted to 1,676 mm (5 ft 6 in) Broad Gauge and train services were resumed which extended its part to Masagram in 2012, thus making Masagram Junction point of Bankura Damodar Railway & connecting Howrah–Bardhaman chord.

== Bankura–Purulia Railway ==
The Bankura-Purulia Light Railway(BPLR) was a similar proposal to connect Bankura with Purulia via Dhaldanga, Puabagan, Kumidiya, Teghori, Hatgram, Bishpuria, Hura & Hutmura. The plan was to connect Bankura & Purulia belt with a 84.4 kilometres (52.4 mi) long Narrow Gauge railway line. From 1916-17 the line was laid from Bankura to Puabagan & from Purulia to Hura. But a catastrophic flood in 1917-18 washed away line from Bankura to Dhaldanga & lack of Passengers prompted McLeod Russell & Co. Ltd. to scrap the route.

== Burdwan–Katwa Railway ==
Burdwan–Katwa Railway connecting Bardhaman (earlier known as Burdwan) and Katwa in now Bardhaman district, West Bengal was opened to traffic on 1 December 1915. The railway was built in 2 ft 6 in (762 mm) gauge and total length was 53 kilometres (33 mi).

The engines chugged along at the maximum speed of 30 km per hour.

The 52 km long railway section was converted to 1,676 mm (5 ft 6 in) broad gauge. The Bardhaman-Katwa line after conversion from narrow gauge to electrified broad gauge was opened to the public on 12 January 2018.

== Kalighat–Falta Railway ==
Kalighat–Falta Railway

Overview
- Owner: McLeod's Light Railways
- Locale: West Bengal

Service
- Operator: McLeod's Light Railways
- Depot(s): Kalighat, Falta

History
- Opened: 1915–1917

Technical
- Line length: 45 km (28 mi)
- Track length: 45 km (28 mi)
- Number of tracks: 1
- Track gauge: 2 ft 6 in (762 mm)
- Operating speed: NG 36 kilometres per hour (22 mph)

Kalighat–Falta Railway connecting Gholeshapur in Behala to Falta was opened on 28 May 1917 and was extended a further 0.92 miles (1.48 km) to Kalighat, now Majherhat in West Bengal on 7 May 1920. The railway was built in 2 ft 6 in (762 mm) gauge and total length was 27 miles (43 km).

The KFR line was the first in India to use three brand new 2-6-2 side tank AK16 locomotives, built in November 1916 by W. G. Bagnall Ltd. of the Castle Engine Works at Stafford in England. They entered service with KFR in February 1917. The 'AK' in the name stood for 'Ahmedpur-Katwa'. They were also known as the 'Delta Class' engines (since they were originally ordered by the Egyptian Delta Light Railways but were more successful in India) and they were very successful and a lot many were used in the following years till 1953 when the last order was placed. One of the 1916-built Bagnall locomotives has been preserved by the Phyllis Rampton Narrow Gauge Railway Trust at the Vale of Rheidol Railway in the UK.

It is a small line—26’2 miles of narrow gauge. A private company was running it at a deficit and according to the agreement entered into with that company by the Central Government, we have been paying a subsidy, on an average, of Rs. 3 71 lakhs, from year to year. Therefore, we decided that it will be better to take over this and dismantle it, if adequate facilities are provided for the public. The West Bengal Government also took up the matter with us and they gave an assurance that they would make all possible efforts; they said that the road services would be sufficiently developed in that area to cope with the normal traffic; That is the position so far as public are concerned

As regards the staff of the Kalighat-Falta Railway, it had been decided by the Government of India to offer fresh employment(during 1952) to such of the staff as are below the age of superannuation and are otherwise found suitable. Detailed instructions in this connection have already issued to the General Managers of the Eastern and the South-Eastern Railways So, on both these points, namely, hardship to the public and unemployment to the staff, we have taken measures so that the public will not be put to inconvenience when this line is eventually dismantled and the staff who have not superannuated will be offered alternative employment.

Due to ever-increasing losses, the KFR was closed in 1957.The land where the tracks used to be was used to construct a road, the James Long Sarani, in Behala.

== Classification ==
The McLeod's Light Railways were labeled as Class III railways according to Indian Railway Classification System of 1926.
