= Shampa Dhara =

Indian politician (born 1992)

Member of the West Bengal Legislative Assembly
- Incumbent
- Assumed office 2021-2026
- Preceded by: Nepal Ghorui
- Succeeded by: Subhash Patra
- Constituency: Raina

Personal details
- Born: 1992 (age 33–34) Purba Bardhaman district, West Bengal
- Party: All India Trinamool Congress
- Education: Bachelor of Arts (University of Burdwan)

Shampa Dhara (born 1992) is an Indian politician from West Bengal. She is a member of the West Bengal Legislative Assembly from Raina Assembly constituency, which is reserved for Scheduled Caste community, in Purba Bardhaman district. She won the 2021 West Bengal Legislative Assembly election representing the All India Trinamool Congress.

== Early life and education ==
Dhara is from Raina, Purba Bardhaman district, West Bengal. She is the daughter of Gangadhar Dhara. She completed Bachelor of Arts in 2015 at Vivekananda Mahavidyalya, Purba Burdhwan, which is affiliated with the University of Burdwan. She served as the chairperson of the East Burdwan Zilla Parishad before becoming an MLA.

== Career ==
Dhara won from Raina Assembly constituency representing All India Trinamool Congress in the 2021 West Bengal Legislative Assembly election. She polled 108,752 votes and defeated her nearest rival, Manik Roy of the Bharatiya Janata Party, by a margin of 18,205 votes. In June 2022, she was involved in a controversy where she allegedly selected rebel candidates, and they were given party symbol in the local body elections.
