= Pursha =

Pursha Pursa
- Village
- Location in West Bengal, India Pursha (India)
- Coordinates: 23.3713°N 87.6277°E
- Country: India
- State: West Bengal
- District: Purba Bardhaman

Population (2011)
  - Total: 2,925

Languages
  - Official: Bengali, English
- Time zone: UTC+5:30 (IST)
- Lok Sabha constituency: Bardhaman-Durgapur
- Vidhan Sabha constituency: Galsi
- Website: purbabardhaman.gov.in

Pursha is a village in Galsi I CD Block in Bardhaman Sadar North subdivision of Purba Bardhaman district in the Indian state of West Bengal.r

== Geography ==
Cities and towns in the Bardhaman Sadar North subdivision of Purba Bardhaman district
M: municipal city/ town, CT: census town, R: rural/ urban centre, H: historical site, W: river project, C: craft centre
Owing to space constraints in the small map, the actual locations in a larger map may vary slightly

=== Location ===
Pursha is located at 23.3713°N 87.6277°E.

=== Urbanisation ===
73.58% of the population of Bardhaman Sadar North subdivision live in the rural areas. Only 26.42% of the population live in the urban areas, and that is the highest proportion of urban population amongst the four subdivisions in Purba Bardhaman district. The map alongside presents some of the notable locations in the subdivision. All places marked in the map are linked in the larger full screen map.

== Demographics ==
As per the 2011 Census of India, Pursha had a total population of 5,740 of which 2,925 (51%) were males and 2,815 (49%) were females. Population below 6 years was 617. The total number of literates in Pursha was 4,085 (79.74% of the population over 6 years).

== Transport ==
Pursha is on National Highway 19 (old numbering NH 2)/ Grand Trunk Road.

== Education ==
Pursa High School, a coeducational institution, is affiliated with the West Bengal Board of Secondary Education. It is also affiliated with West Bengal Council of Higher Secondary Education for higher secondary classes.

== Healthcare ==
Mankar Rural Hospital at Mankar (with 30 beds) and Pursha Rural Hospital at Pursha (with 30 beds) are the main medical facilities in Galsi I CD block. There are primary health centres at: Bharatpur (with 6 beds) and Lowa, PO Dwarmari (with 10 beds).

See also - Healthcare in West Bengal
