= Pahalanpur =

Pahalanpur পহলানপুর
- Village
- Location in West Bengal, India
- Coordinates: 22.9631°N 87.8676°E
- Country: India
- State: West Bengal
- District: Purba Bardhaman
- Subdivision: Bardhaman Sadar South

Population (2011)
  - Total: 4,180

Languages
  - Official: Bengali, English
- Time zone: UTC+5:30 (IST)
- Sex ratio: 908 ♂/♀
- Website: purbabardhaman.gov.in

Pahalanpur is a village under Raina II CD block in Bardhaman Sadar South subdivision of Purba Bardhaman district in the Indian state of West Bengal.

== Geography ==
Pahalanpur is located at 22.8561°N 87.8566°E.

Madhabdihi police station has jurisdiction over Raina II CD Block.

=== Climate ===
The temperature in the summer is 28 to 32 and in winter 10 to 19.Average rainfall 175 cm.

== Demographics ==
As per the 2011 Census of India Pahalanpur had a total population of 4,180 of which 2,109 (50%) were males and 2,071 (50%) were females. Population below 6 years was 343. The total number of literates in Pahalanpur was 3,302 (86.06% of the population over 6 years).

== Economics ==
This is a rich agricultural area with several cold storages. Chief products are potato and rice.

== Education ==
Pahalanpur high school is major school in Pahalanpur. There are 3 primary school in Pahalanpur.

Pahalanpur High School is a coeducational high school affiliated with the West Bengal Board of Secondary Education. It is also affiliated with West Bengal Council of Higher Secondary Education for higher secondary classes.

== Transport ==
The Arambagh to Burdwan via Shyamsundar line crossing through the Pahalanpur.
