= Shillya =

- Village
- Location in West Bengal, India Shillya (India)
- Coordinates: 23°17′37″N 87°34′23″E
- Country: India
- State: West Bengal
- District: Purba Bardhaman

Population (2011)
  - Total: 1,272

Languages
  - Official: Bengali, English
- Time zone: UTC+5:30 (IST)
- Lok Sabha constituency: Bardhaman-Durgapur
- Vidhan Sabha constituency: Galsi
- Website: bardhaman.gov.in

Shillya also spelled as Shilla or Silla is a village located in Lowa Ramgopalpur Gram Payanchayet in Galsi I CD Block in Bardhaman Sadar North subdivision of Purba Bardhaman district in West Bengal in India.

== Geography ==
Shillya village is located at 23.2937 N 87.572952 E, on the bank of Damodar River. It is under Galsi (Vidhan Sabha constituency).

=== Climate ===
The Köppen Climate Classification sub-type for this climate is "Aw" (Tropical Savanna Climate).

Climate data for Shillya, Burdwan, India
Month	Jan	Feb	Mar	Apr	May	Jun	Jul	Aug	Sep	Oct	Nov	Dec	Year
Mean daily maximum °C (°F)	26.0 (78.8)	27.5 (81.5)	34.5 (94.1)	37.4 (99.4)	32.6 (90.7)	34.9 (94.9)	32 (90)	32.3 (90.1)	32.4 (90.3)	32.0 (89.6)	28.0 (82.4)	26.0 (78.8)	31.32 (88.38)
Mean daily minimum °C (°F)	12.0 (53.6)	15 (59)	20 (68)	24.9 (76.8)	25.9 (78.6)	26.0 (78.8)	25 (77)	25 (77)	25 (77)	24.7 (76.5)	17.5 (63.5)	12.5 (54.5)	21 (70)
Average precipitation mm (inches)	18 (0.7)	38 (1.5)	33 (1.3)	48 (1.9)	130 (5)	240 (9.6)	350 (13.7)	310 (12.3)	290 (11.4)	160 (6.2)	28 (1.1)	5.1 (0.2)	140 (5.4)
Average rainy days	4	3	4	6	10	18	23	22	18	11	3	1	123
Source: Weather2

== Population ==
Data	Total people	SC	ST
Male:	646	259	2
Female:	626	262	2
Total:	1272	521	4

Region	Sex Ratio	Literacy
Shillya	969	78.55%
West Bengal	950	76.26%

There are 285 families and total population of the village is 1272. Among them 646 are males and 626 are females. There are 521 Scheduled Caste (259 males and 262 females) and 4 Scheduled Tribe (2 males and 2 females). The average sex ratio of this village is 969 which is greater than West Bengal average of 950. Literary rate of this village is 78.55% (male 83.39% and female 73.49%) which is also greater than West Bengal literacy which is 76.26%. Here 40.96% of people are from Scheduled Caste and 0.31% people are from Scheduled Tribe.

== Neighbourhoods ==
The village Shilla has neighbourhoods or paras.

=== Upper Shillya ===
It is known as Upper Shillya as this part has higher ground level than other parts of Shilla.

=== Namo Shillya ===
It is known as Namo Shilla (Namo means lower) because this part is lower than the other parts of Shilla.

=== Shillya ghat ===
It is known as Shillaghat/Shillyaghat (ghat means collecting centre of sand or bank of river) as it is the sand collecting spot.

== Culture ==
There are two temples of the Hindu goddess Durga at Upper Shilla. There are also three temples of Devi Kali and two temples of Devi Manasa at Upper Shilla. There is another temple of Durga at Namo Shilla. A small fair is organized here in the winter season (on the last day of the Bengali month Poush) beside the Damodar River.

== Gallery ==
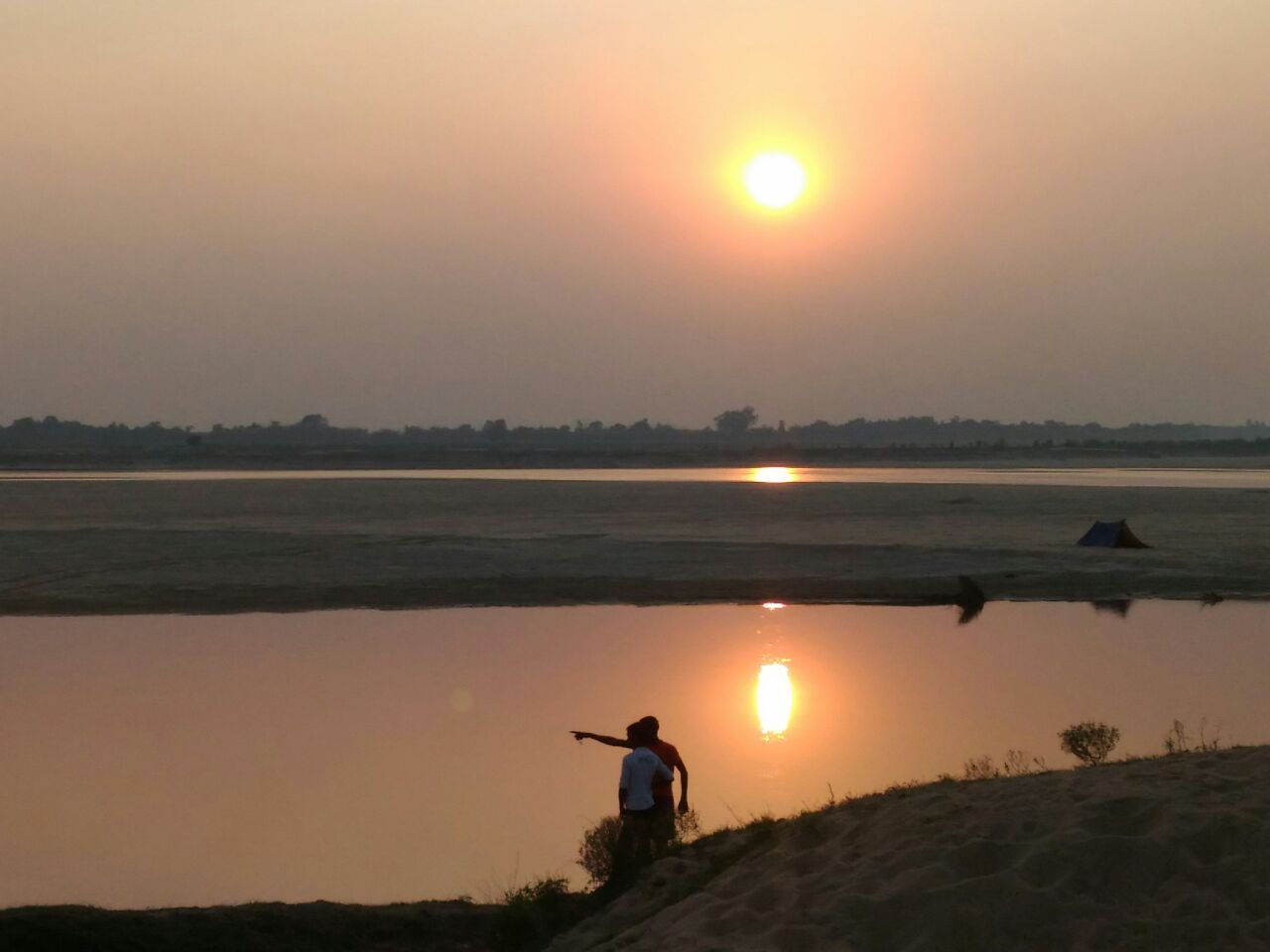
Sunset at Shillya

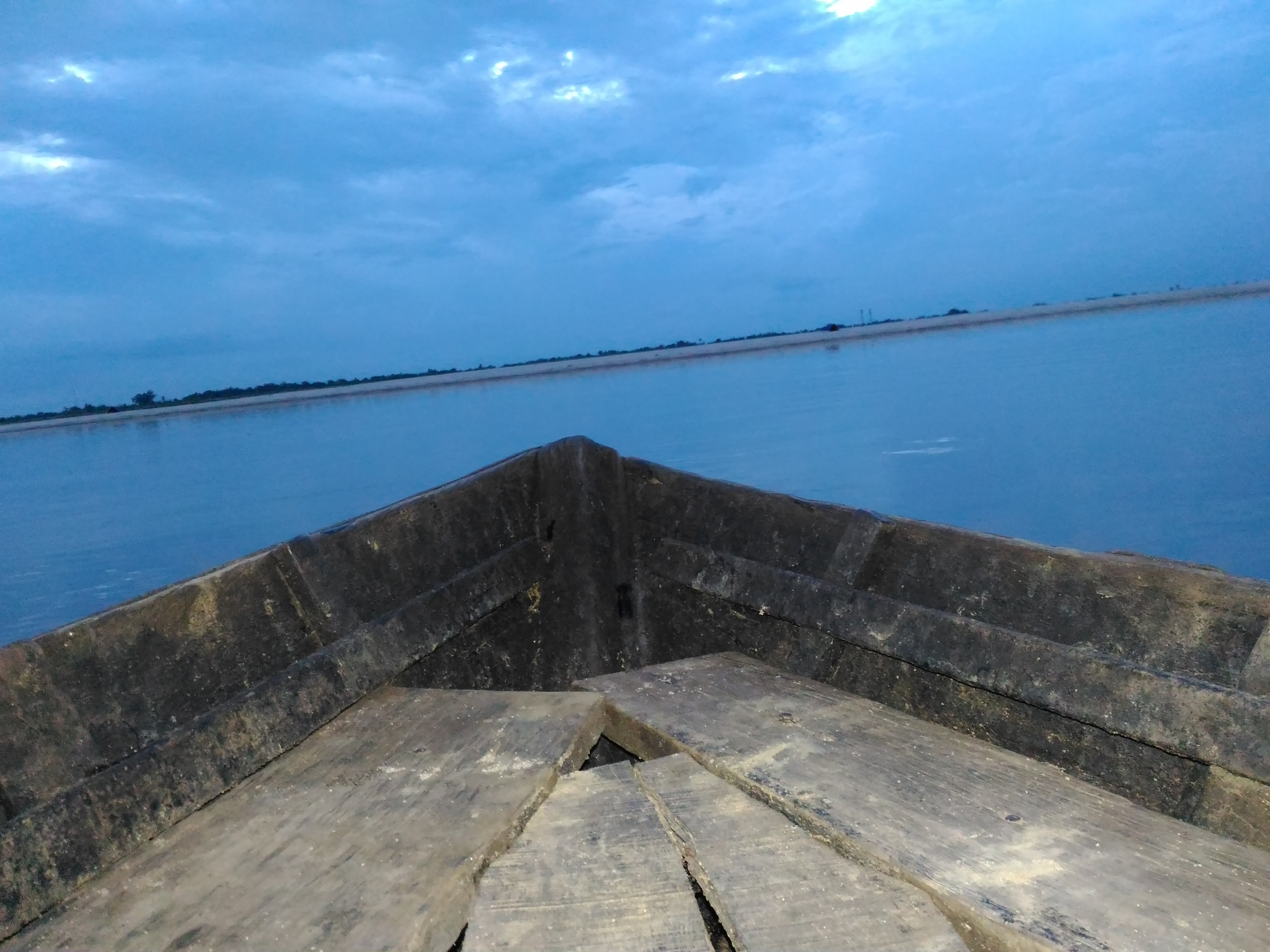
Evening at Shillya

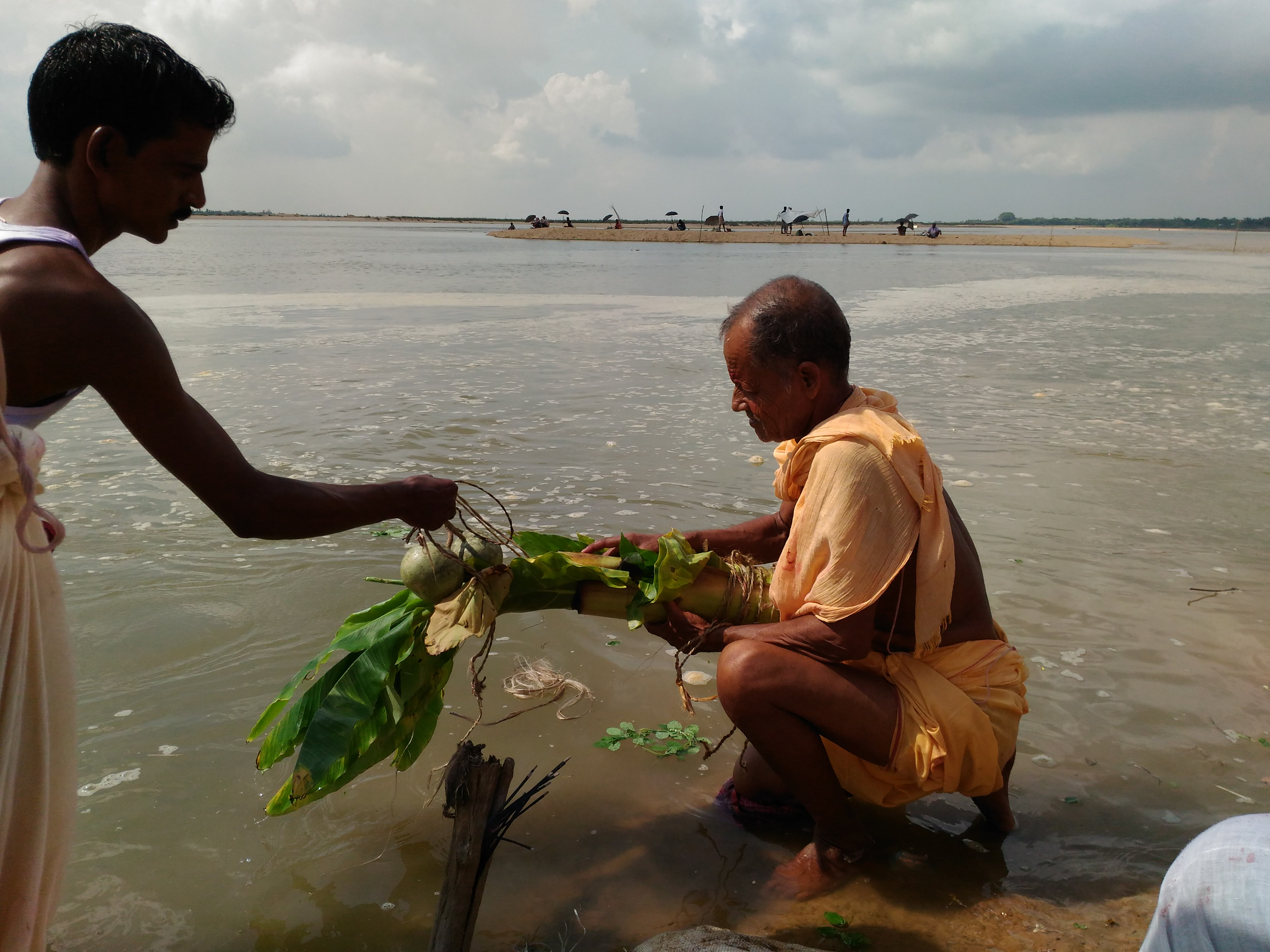
Damodar River at Shillya

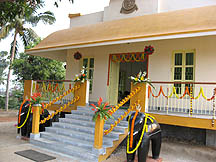
Shillya mission temple

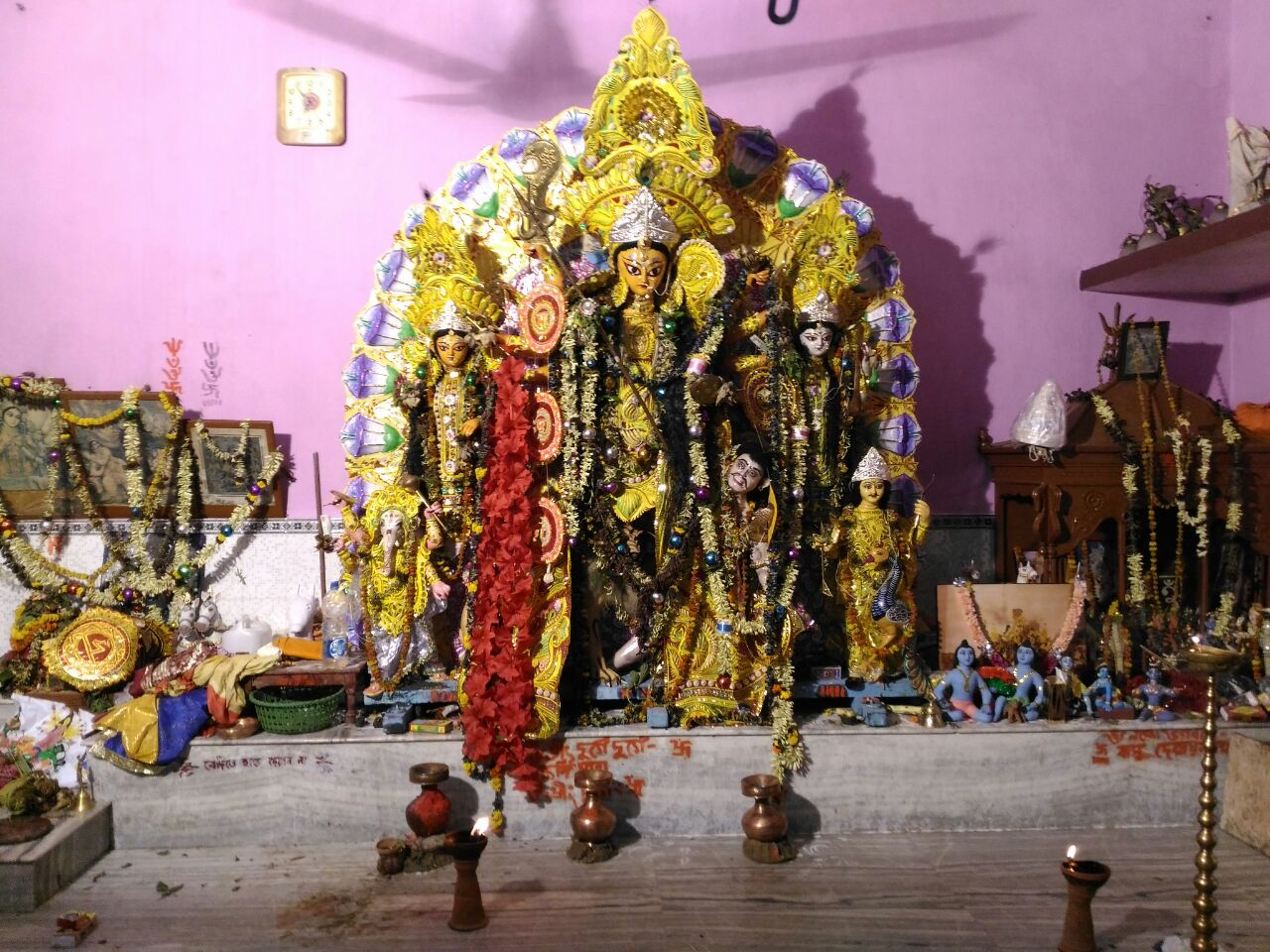
Durga of Shillya

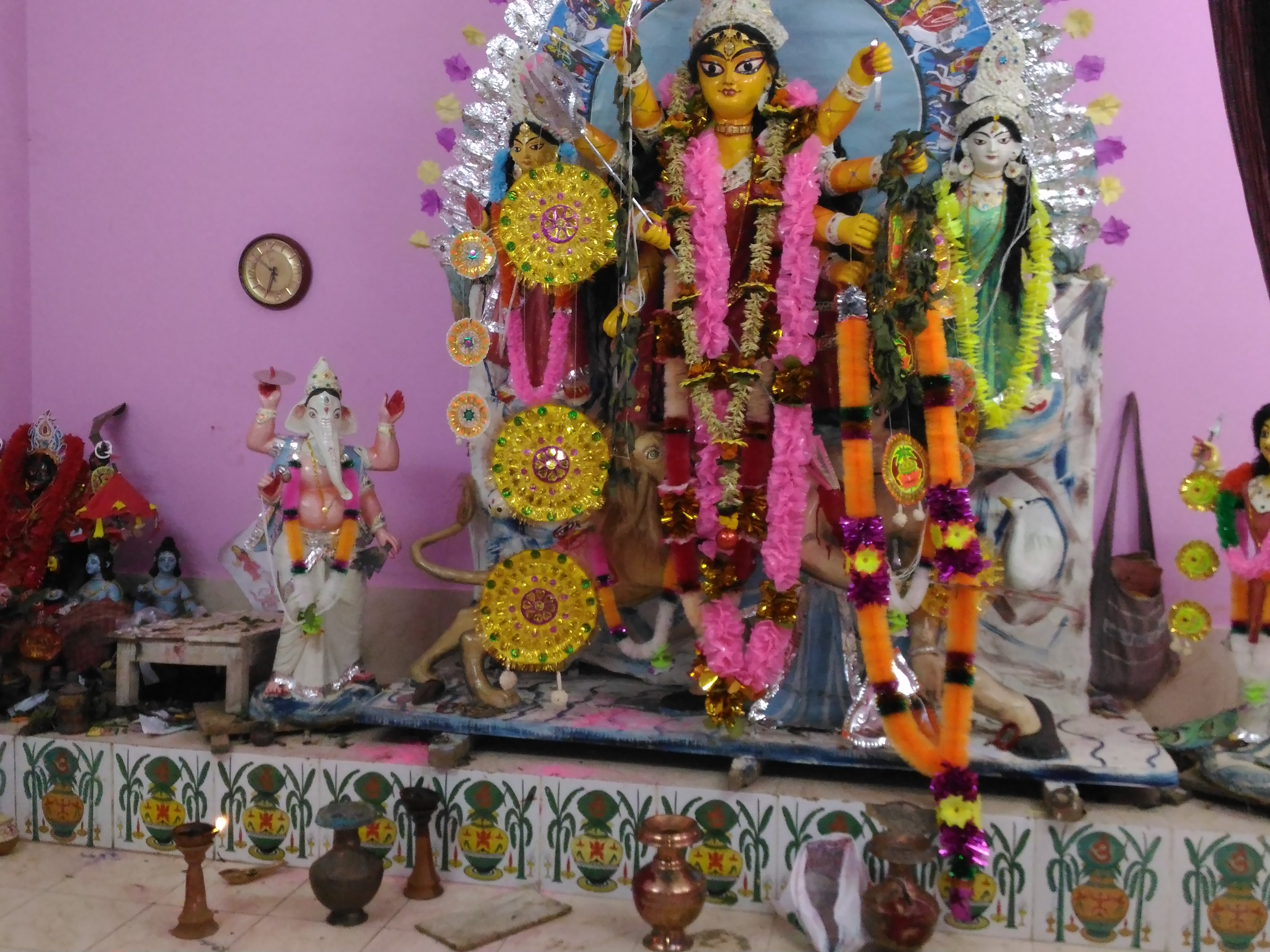
Durga Murti

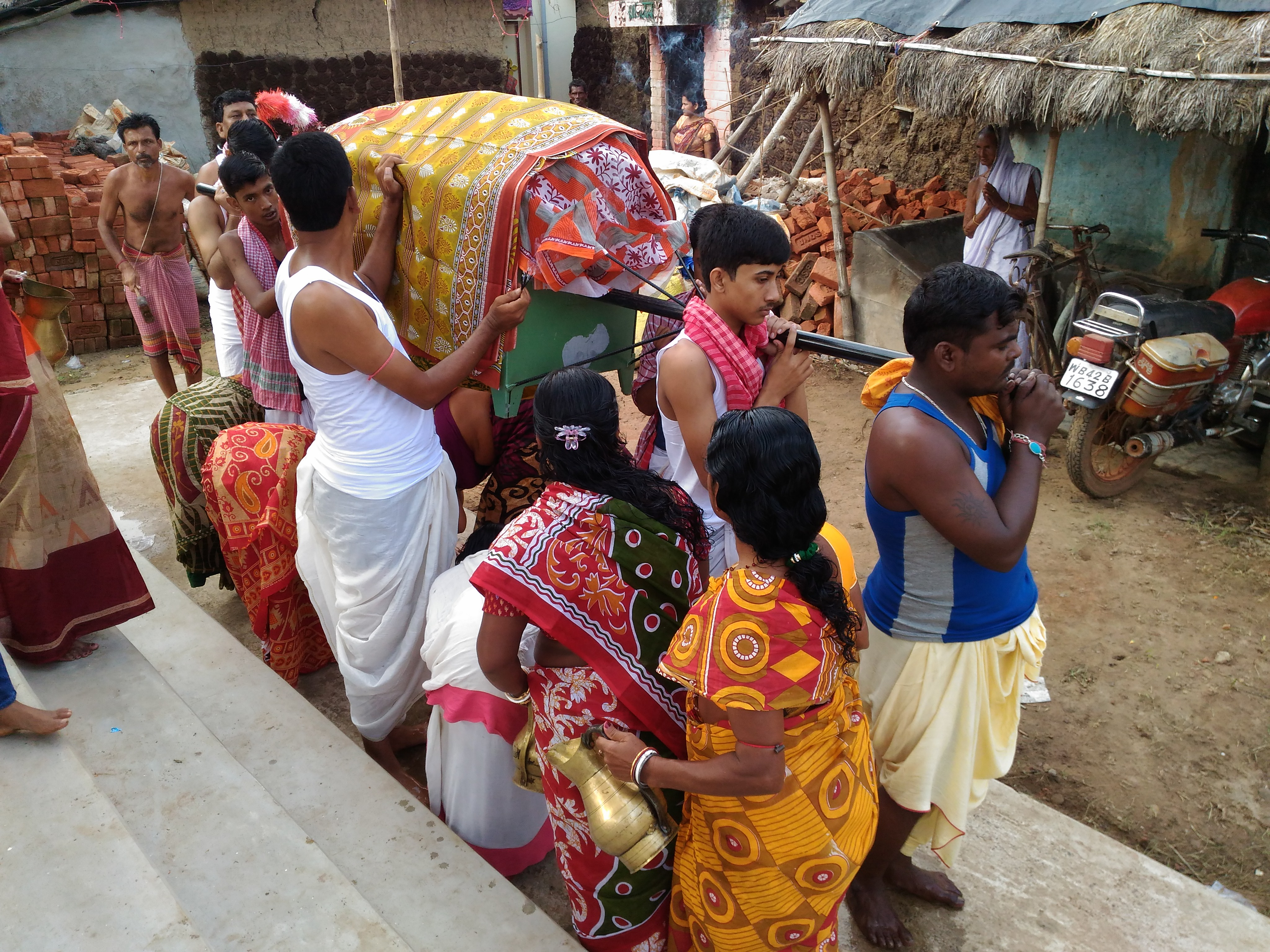
Upar Shillya Durgatala
