= Madhabdihi =

- Village
- Location in West Bengal, India Madhabdihi (India)
- Coordinates: 23.0194°N 87.8758°E
- Country: India
- State: West Bengal
- District: Purba Bardhaman

Population (2011)
  - Total: 2,584

Languages
  - Official: Bengali, English
- Time zone: UTC+5:30 (IST)
- Telephone/STD code: 03211
- Lok Sabha constituency: Bardhaman Purba
- Vidhan Sabha constituency: Raina
- Website: purbabardhaman.gov.in

Madhabdihi is a village in Raina II CD block in Bardhaman Sadar South subdivision of Purba Bardhaman district in the state of West Bengal, India.

== Geography ==
Cities and towns in the Bardhaman Sadar South subdivision of Purba Bardhaman district
M: municipal city/ town, CT: census town, R: rural/ urban centre, H: historical/ religious centre.
Owing to space constraints in the small map, the actual locations in a larger map may vary slightly

=== Urbanisation ===
95.54% of the population of Bardhaman Sadar South subdivision live in the rural areas. Only 4.46% of the population live in the urban areas, and that is the lowest proportion of urban population amongst the four subdivisions in Purba Bardhaman district. The map alongside presents some of the notable locations in the subdivision. All places marked in the map are linked in the larger full screen map.

=== Police station ===
Madhabdihi police station has jurisdiction over Raina II CD Block.Great revolutionary Rash Behari Bose was born under this police station area. The area covered is 225.5 km^{2}.

=== CD block HQ ===
The headquarters of Raina II CD block are located at Madhabdihi.

== Demographics ==
As per the 2011 Census of India Madhabdihi had a total population of 2,584, of which 1,315 (51%) were males and 1,269 (49%) were females. Population below 6 years was 289. The total number of literates in Madhabdihi was 1,866 (81.31% of the population over 6 years).

== Transport ==
Mandela Road links Madhabdihi to Bardhaman Road.

== Education ==
Saknara High School on Kabikankan Road is a coeducational Bengali-medium high school.

== Healthcare ==
Madhabdihi Rural Hospital at Madhabdihi, PO Chhoto-bainan (with 30 beds) is the main medical facility in Raina II CD block. There are primary health centres at Binodpur, PO Bajekamarpur (with 2 beds), Gotan (with 6 beds), Kaity (with 10 beds), Painta (with 4 beds) and Subaldaha (with 10 beds).

See also - Healthcare in West Bengal
