= Mankar =

- Village
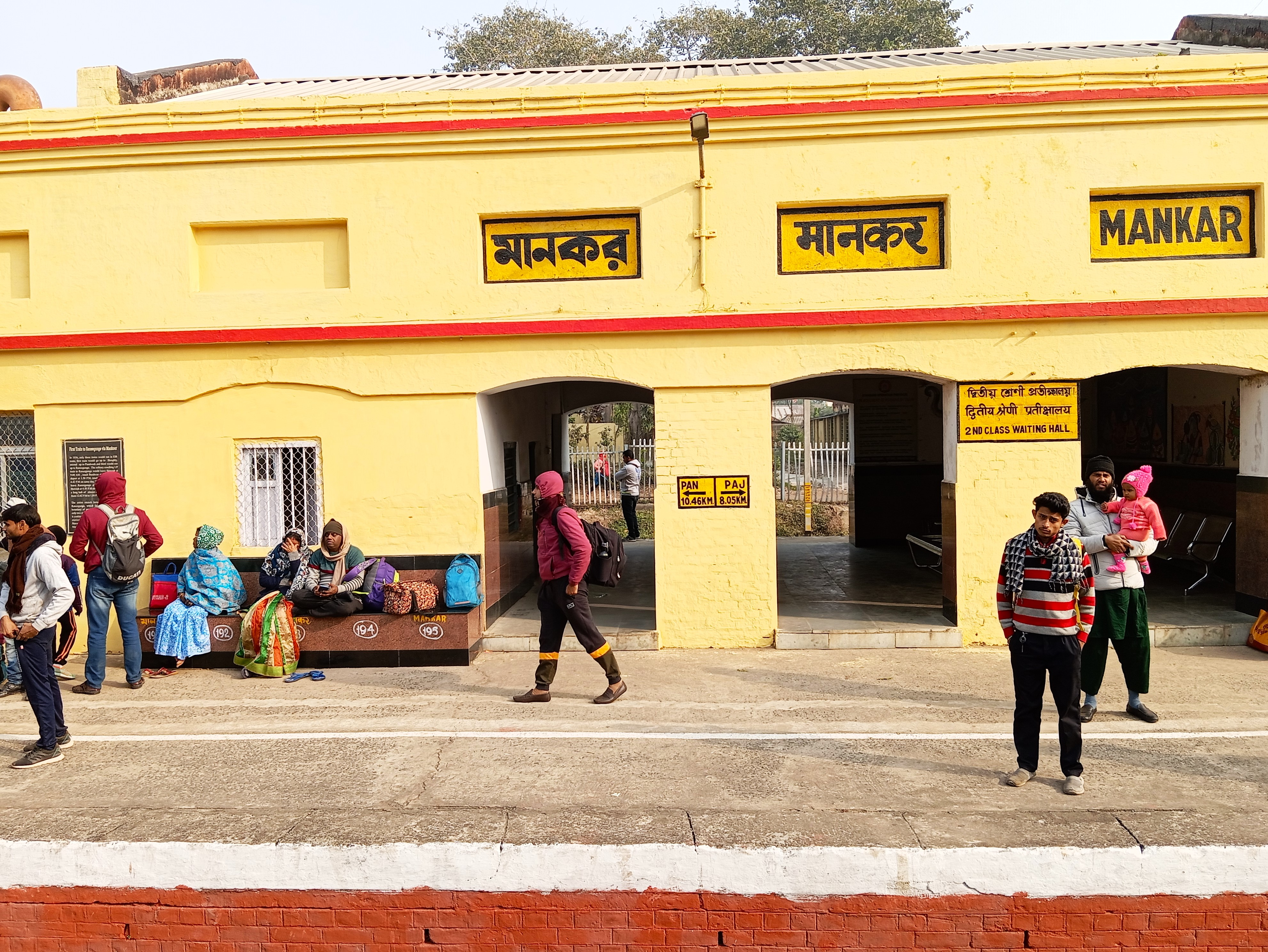
- Mankar railway station platform

- Location in West Bengal, India Mankar (India)
- Coordinates: 23°25′42.308″N 87°33′21.731″E
- Country: India
- State: West Bengal
- District: Purba Bardhaman

Population (2011)
  - Total: 10,370

Languages
  - Official: Bengali, English
- Time zone: UTC+5:30 (IST)
- PIN: 713144 (Mankar)
- Telephone/STD code: 03452
- Lok Sabha constituency: Bardhaman-Durgapur
- Vidhan Sabha constituency: Galsi
- Website: purbabardhaman.gov.in

Mankar is a village in Galsi I CD Block in Bardhaman Sadar North subdivision of Purba Bardhaman district in the state of West Bengal, India.

== Mythology ==
It is said that the Pandavas lived in hiding at Mankar during their agyatbasa. There is a very old temple with idols of the Pandavas.

== History ==
Mankar is an ancient rich place in East Burdwan district. The Rangmahal zamindarbari is located in the Raipur area. These Kanauj Brahmins of Mankar were the chief zamindars of Mankar. That was about 500 years ago. The ancestor of this dynasty was Dubey, a native of Kanauj of the northern India. His successors were Manorath Dubey and Srikanth Dubey.This Srikanta Dubey came from Kanauj to Chandrakona in Medinipur after receiving initiation(diksha) by the Radhaballav Sampraday in Mathura and received the title of Goswami. Their descendants were Madhusudan Goswami, Niharidas Goswami and Shyamsunder Goswami. Pandit Shyamsunder Goswami initiated(Guru Diksha) to Maharaja Jagatram Rai and his wife Brajkishori Devi and came to live in Khandari village near Mankar. Bhaktalal Goswami, son of Shyamsunder Goswami, initiated (Guru Diksha) to Maharaja Kirti chand Rai of Burdwan and his son Chitra sen Rai. As Gurudakshina in 1129 BS (1722 AD) the village of Mankar Raipur got Brahmottar from Maharaja Kirti chand. Pandit Bhaktlal Goswami was the first zamindar of Mankar Raipur. He built a zamindar house called Rangmahal, Radhaballav temple, Singhabahini temple etc. On the day of Uttarayan Sankranti in 1135 BS, (1729AD) the deity 'Radhaballav Jew' was placed in the newly built Navaratna temple.

The next zamindars of Bhaktalal Goswami were Brajlal Goswami, Setablal Goswami and Ajitlal Goswami. They took part in the development of Mankar.

Apart from Mankar, there were two more estates in Bharatpur and Khandari villages.

Ajitlal's next zamindar was his grandson Hitlal Mishra. He was the only son of Dhankumari Devi, daughter of Ajitlal and Haripriya Devi. Hitlal Mishra was the most accomplished zamindar of this dynasty. On the one hand he was a zamindar and on the other hand he was the owner of the indigo factory, again he was the kuloguru of the Burdwan royal family and the author of manuscripts. Hitlal Mishra wrote numerous manuscripts and collected handwritten manuscripts. He built a Bhagavatalaya in his house to collect books. It seems that the collection of books in his Bhagwatalaya was not found anywhere else in Barddhaman district.

Hitlal Mishra also wrote commentaries on the Srimad-Bhagavatam. sahitya-samrat Bankim chandra Chattopadhyay praised Hitlal Mishra's Gita in his Bangadarshan. He wrote ,"The Bengali Tika can be of two types. One is the Bengali translation of the ancient commentary and commentary by Sankaradi. Second, a new Bengali annotation could be prepared. Some have adopted the first practice. Babu Hitlal Mishra has compiled a summary of his commentary, sometimes a summary of Shankara's commentary, sometimes a summary of Sridhar Swami's commentary. The Bengali readers are especially indebted to him for that.”

The name of Hitlal Mishra is still mentioned in the introduction to the essay 'Srimadbhagavatgita' of Bankim's works.

Hitlal also established tolls on mixed standards. During his tenure there was an impetus for education in Mankar through tolls and bhagavatalas. He used to pay homage to the learned scholars besides the learned ones. Among them Gadadhar Shiromani, Narayan Churamani, Jadabendra Sarvabhaum are notable.

Zamindar Hitlal Mishra's erudition and Bhagwat's generosity made him secular. Although he was a Hindu zamindar in 1860 AD, he built a mosque for the Muslims. He also donated 15 bighas of Niskar land and a pond for making aju to meet the expenses. He also established a Church near the present hospital (Mankar Hospital ). His contribution to the establishment of Mankar High English School was undeniable. Hitlal Mishra laid the foundation stone of Mankar Hattala. He built two big huts there. When the road from Mankar to Budbud became impassable due to the delay of the British government, he repaired it himself and planted hundreds of palm trees on both sides of the road for beautification. By 1873 AD there was a famine in the Mankar region. The situation became deplorable due to food shortage and water crisis. Hitlal Mishra played an important role in such a situation. To alleviate the water crisis, he built Krishnaganga Dighi in imitation of Krishnasayar of Burdwan. He built a total of 12 ghats around it. And for beautification, there was a beautiful combination of different trees around the lake.

At the age of 28, Hitlal Mishra's only son Jagadish Mishra died. Therefore, in 1879 AD, his grandson (daughter's son) Rajkrishna Dixit became the next zamindar of Hitlal Mishra. He was heroic and brave and was anti-British. At one time he banned English goods in his zamindari. In 1905, the Partition of Bengal movement spread all around. It also had an effect on Mankar. Rajkrishna Dixit, the zamindar of Mankar Rangmahal, joined the anti-partition protest movement by burning English cloth in Mankar and was arrested. He was the first Zamindar of Bengal to be imprisoned for the Swadeshi movement. For his protest and courage, The Hitabadi organization rewarded Zamindar Rajkrishna Dixit with ivory stick, silver medals and shawls. He helped the anti-British revolutionaries in many ways. His son Radhakanta Dixit became the next zamindar of Rajkrishna Dixit. He was also a freedom fighter. The revolutionaries at that time formed the practice committee to liberate the country. The revolutionaries of that secret society kept secret contact with Mankar Rangmahal. Jadbendra Panja, Nirod Mitra, Jiten Chowdhury, Girija Prasad Bhattacharya, Fakir Chandra Roy, these revolutionaries used to come to Rangmahal secretly. They used to discuss with the zamindar babu about various steps of the freedom struggle. Zamindar Radhakanta Dixit used to sell some parts of the zamindari and secretly help the revolutionaries. After the death of Radhakanta Dixit at the age of 32, his wife Shaktibala Devi adopted Kanchan Kanti Dixit. He was the last zamindar of Mankar Rangmahal.

== Geography ==
Cities and towns in the Bardhaman Sadar North subdivision of Purba Bardhaman district
M: municipal city/ town, CT: census town, R: rural/ urban centre, H: historical site, W: river project, C: craft centre
Owing to space constraints in the small map, the actual locations in a larger map may vary slightly

=== Location ===
Mankar is located at 23.435319°N 87.55273°E.

=== Urbanisation ===
73.58% of the population of Bardhaman Sadar North subdivision live in the rural areas. Only 26.42% of the population live in the urban areas, and that is the highest proportion of urban population amongst the four subdivisions in Purba Bardhaman district. The map alongside presents some of the notable locations in the subdivision. All places marked in the map are linked in the larger full screen map.

== Demographics ==
As per the 2011 Census of India Mankar had a total population of 10,370, of which 5,290 (51%) were males and 5,080 (49%) were females. Population below 6 years was 1,088. The total number of literates in Mankar was 6,981 (75.21% of the population over 6 years).

== Transport ==
Mankar is a station on the Bardhaman-Asansol section, which is a part of Howrah-Gaya-Delhi line, Howrah-Allahabad-Mumbai line and Howrah-Delhi main line.

State Highway 14 running from Dubrajpur (in Birbhum district) to Betai (in Nadia district) passes through Mankar.

== Education ==
Kanad Institute of Engineering and Management was established at Mankar in 2008. It is affiliated with Maulana Abul Kalam Azad University of Technology.

Mankar College at Mankar was established in 1987. It is affiliated with Kazi Nazrul University (K.N.U.). It offers honours courses in Bengali, Hindi, Sanskrit, English, history, geography, political science, philosophy, accountancy, computer science and mathematics.

Mankar High School, a boys only high school, and Mankar Girls’ High School, a girls only high school, are affiliated with the West Board of Secondary Education. Mankar High School, a co-educational higher secondary unit, is affiliated with West Bengal Council of Higher Secondary Education for higher secondary classes. Mankar High School was established in 1855. Mankar Girls High School was established in 1957.

== Culture ==
David J. McCutchion focuses on several temples at Mankar:

- Deuleswara Shiva temple at Raypur, with rich terracotta façade
- Shiva temple at Bhattacharjeepara with rich terracotta on four sides
- Shiva temple of Dutta family at Raypara having façade fully decorated with terracotta figures
- Lakshmi Janardana temple of Kar family – a plain brick structure
- The unfinished octagonal ridged rekha deul of Biswas family
- Temple with octagonal duplicated chala, equivalent to an atchala
- Domed octagonal Radha Ballav temple with a veranda
- Pancharatna dolmancha

== Mankar picture gallery ==
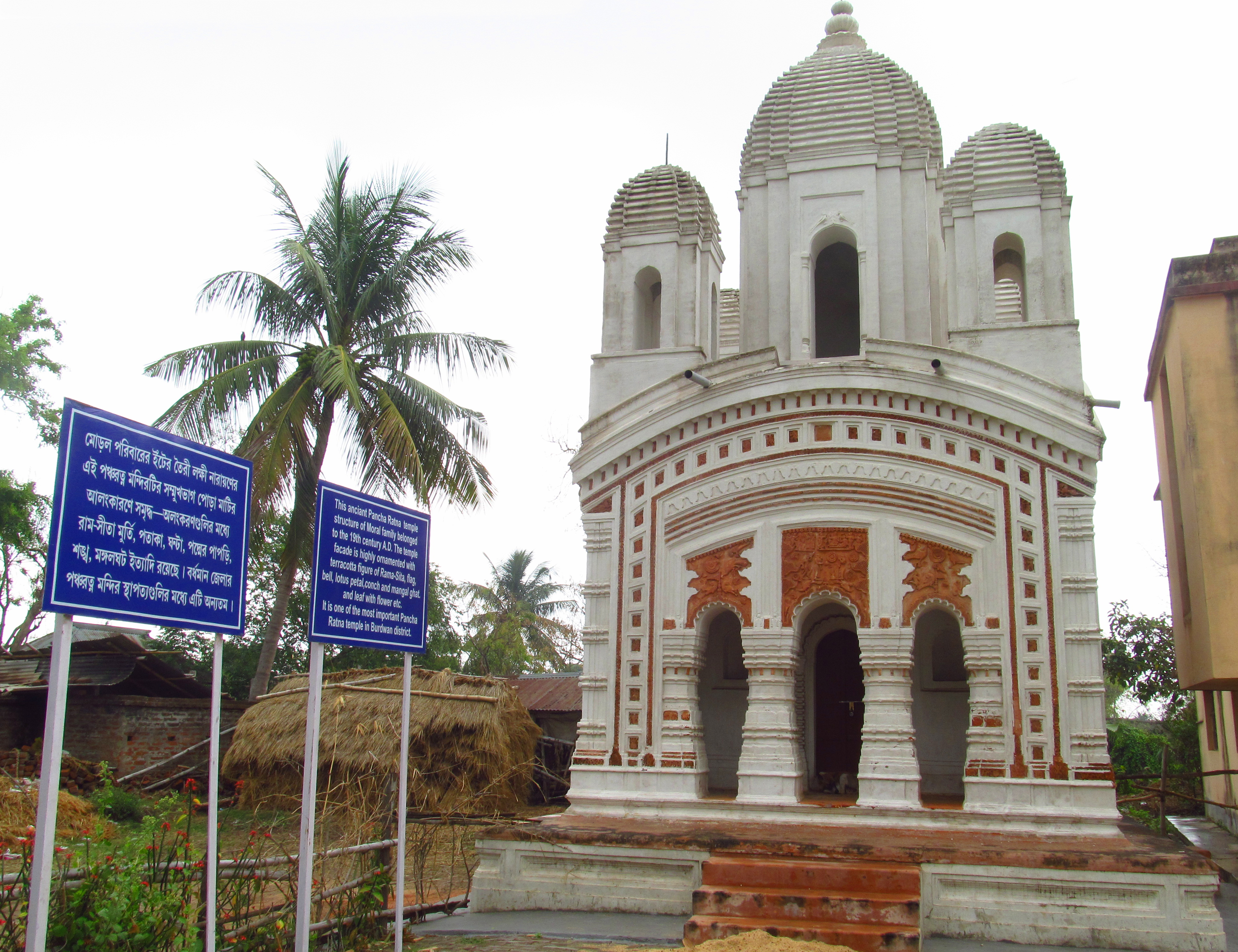
Lakshmi Janardan temple of Morol family

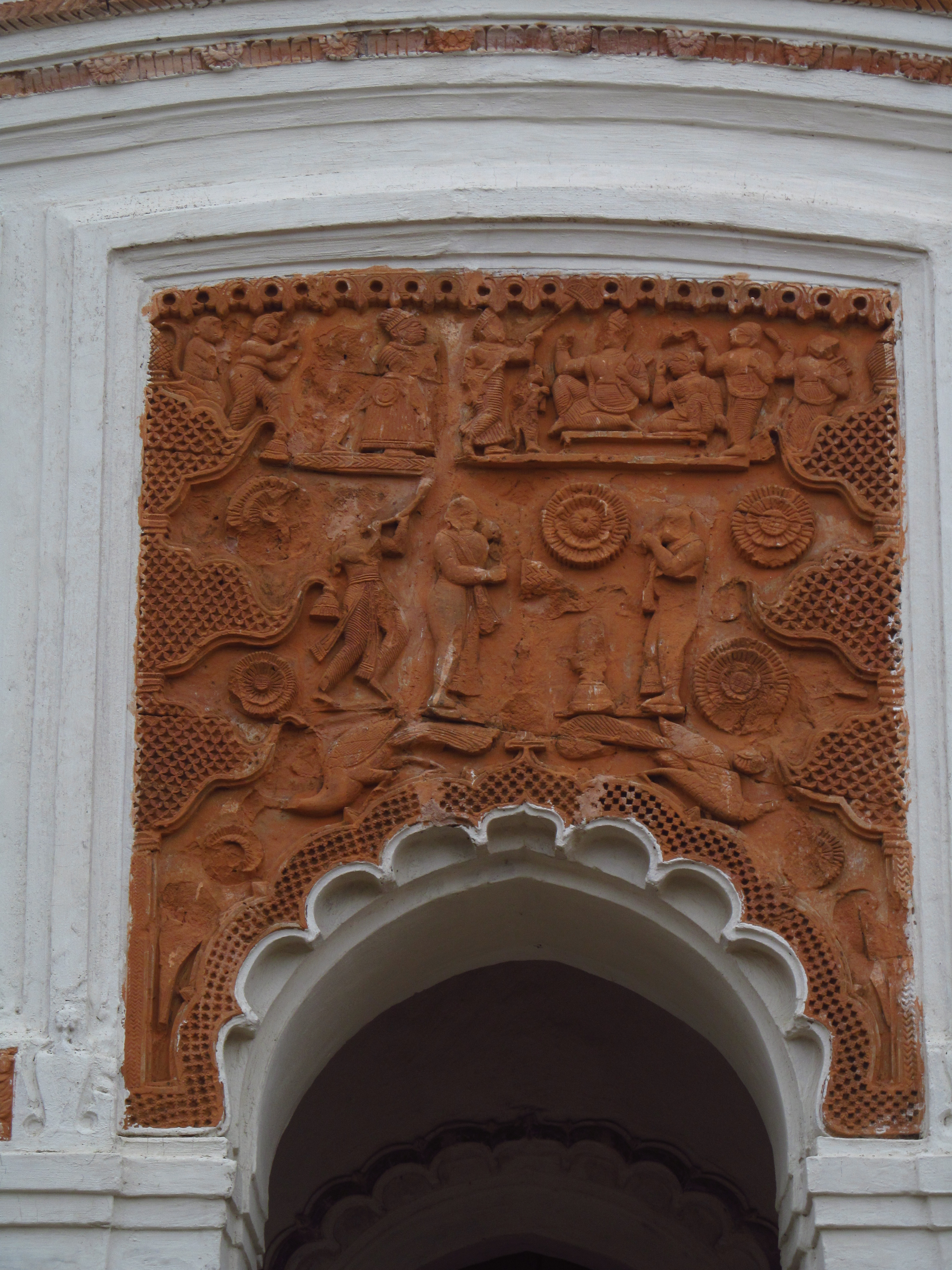
Central arch panel of Morol family temple

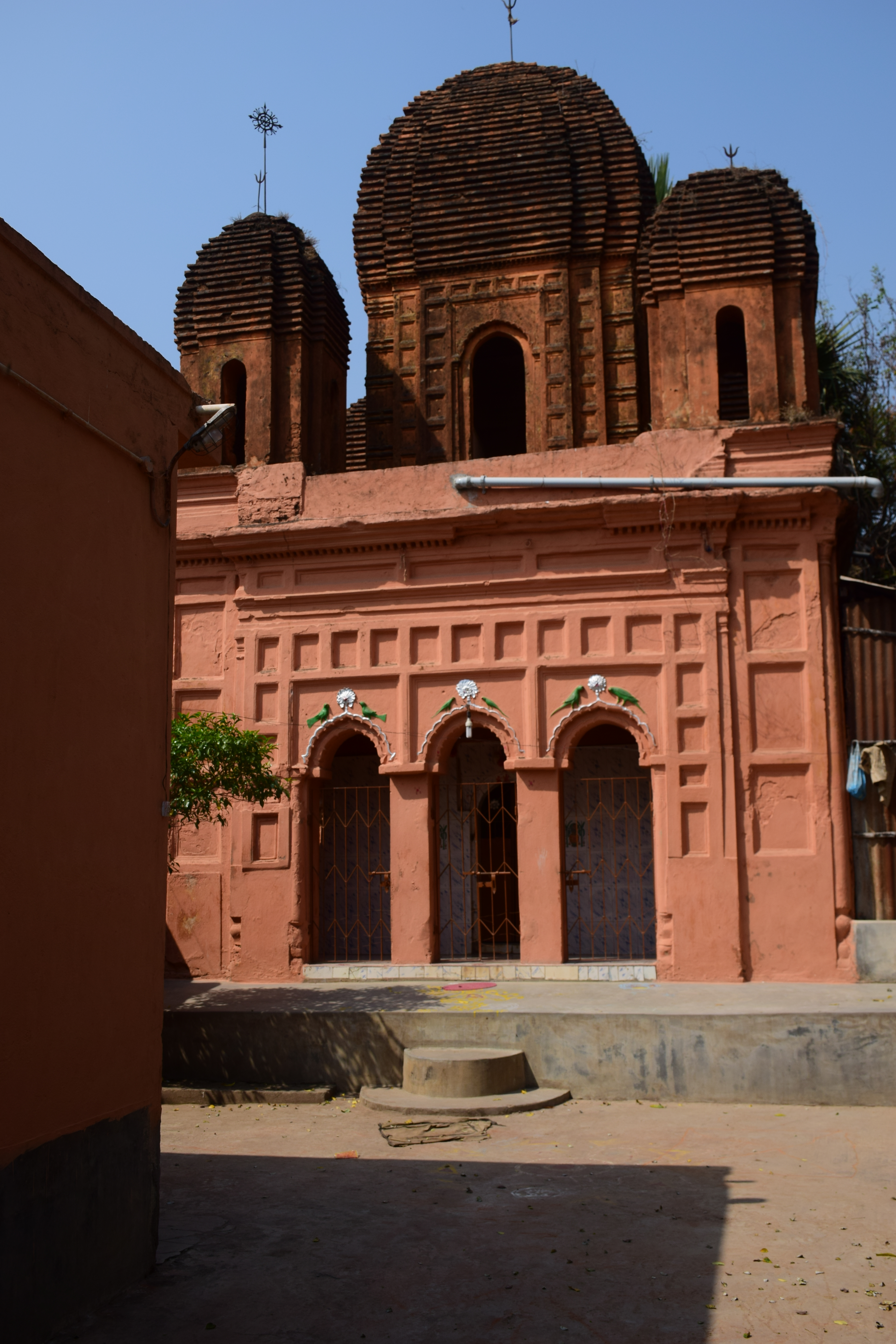
Lakshmi Janardan temple of Kar family

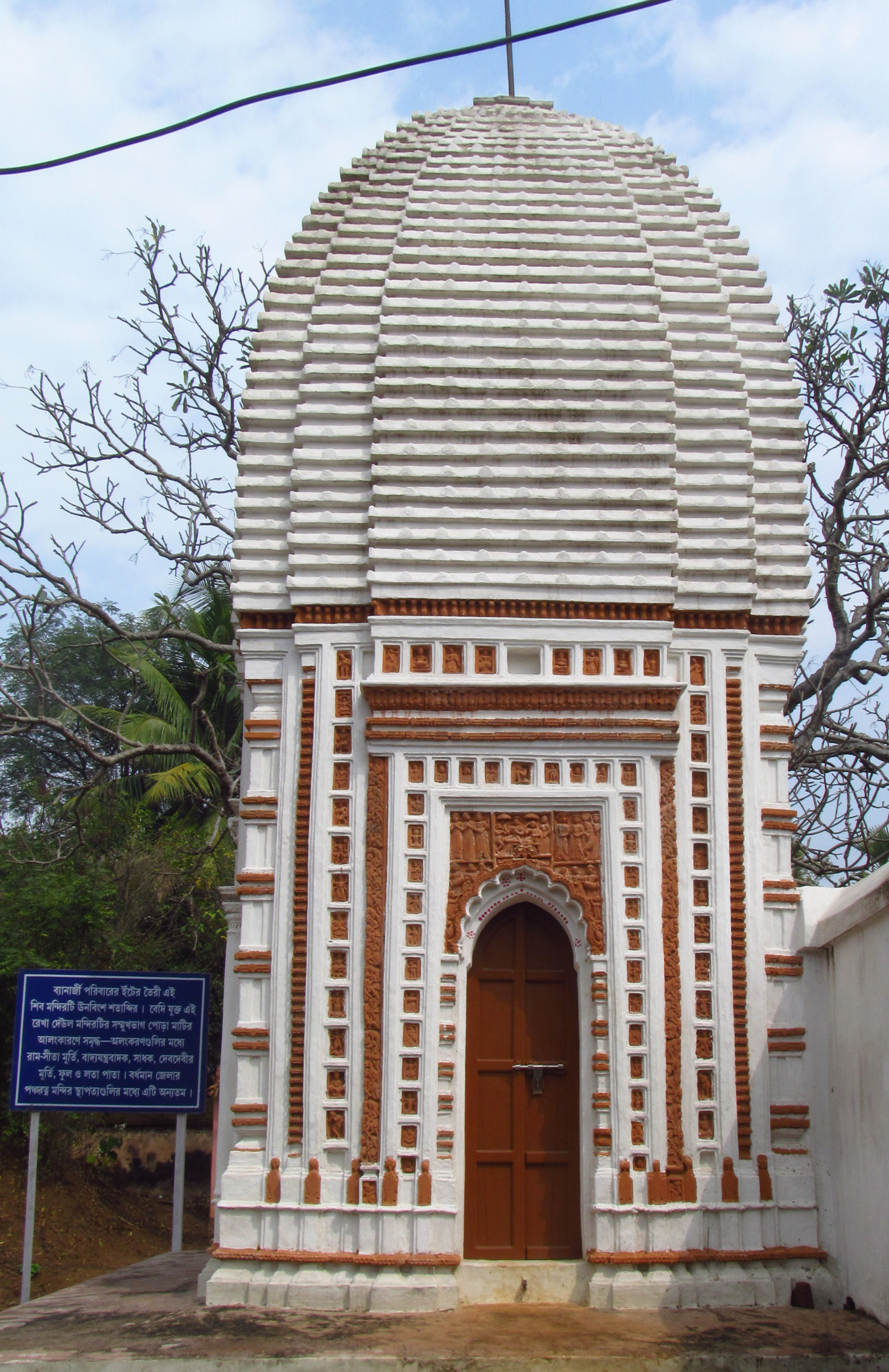
Shiva temple of Banerjee family

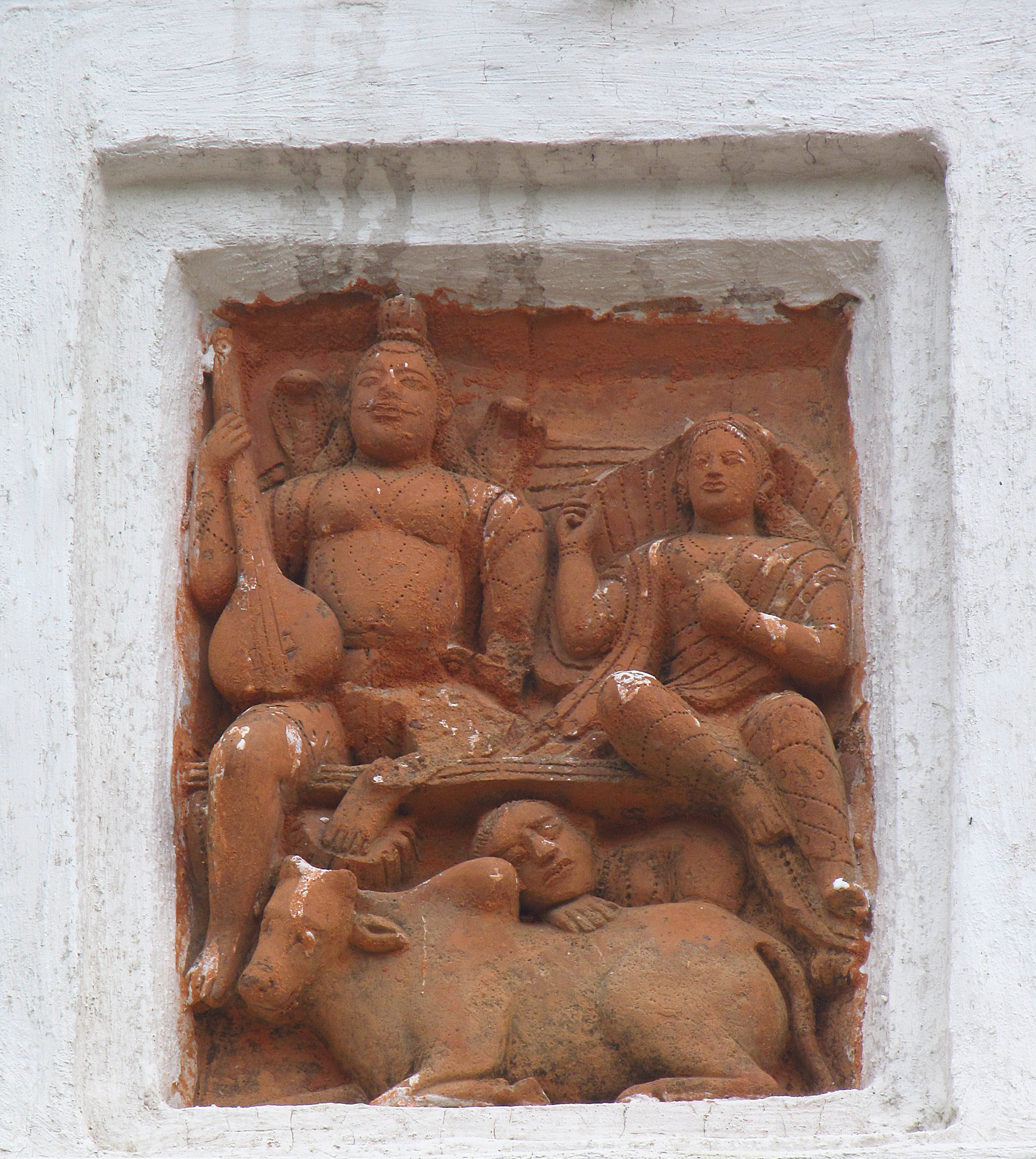
Terracotta wall decoration of Shiva and Parvati in the Banerjee family temple

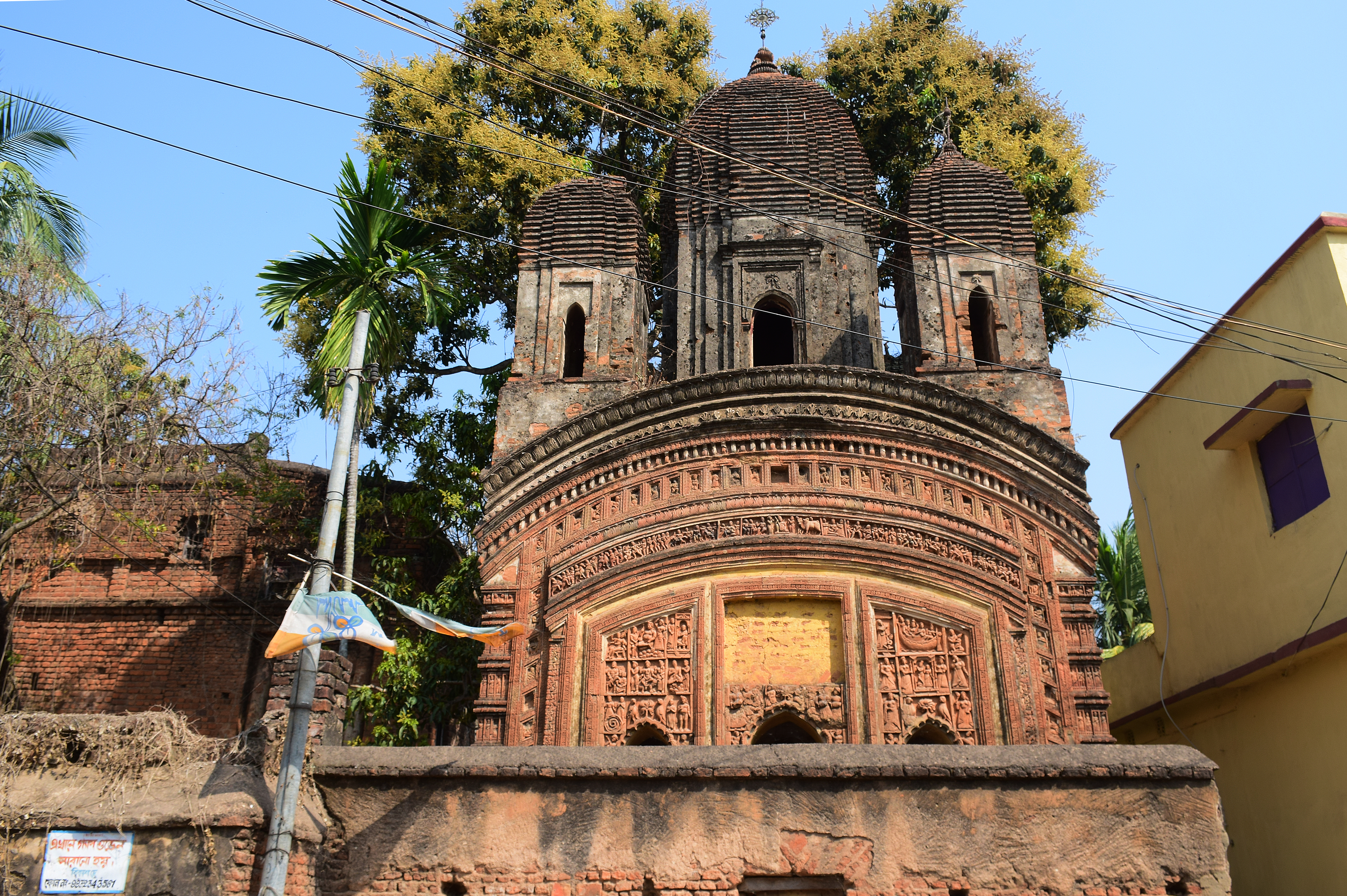
Shiva temple of Dutta family

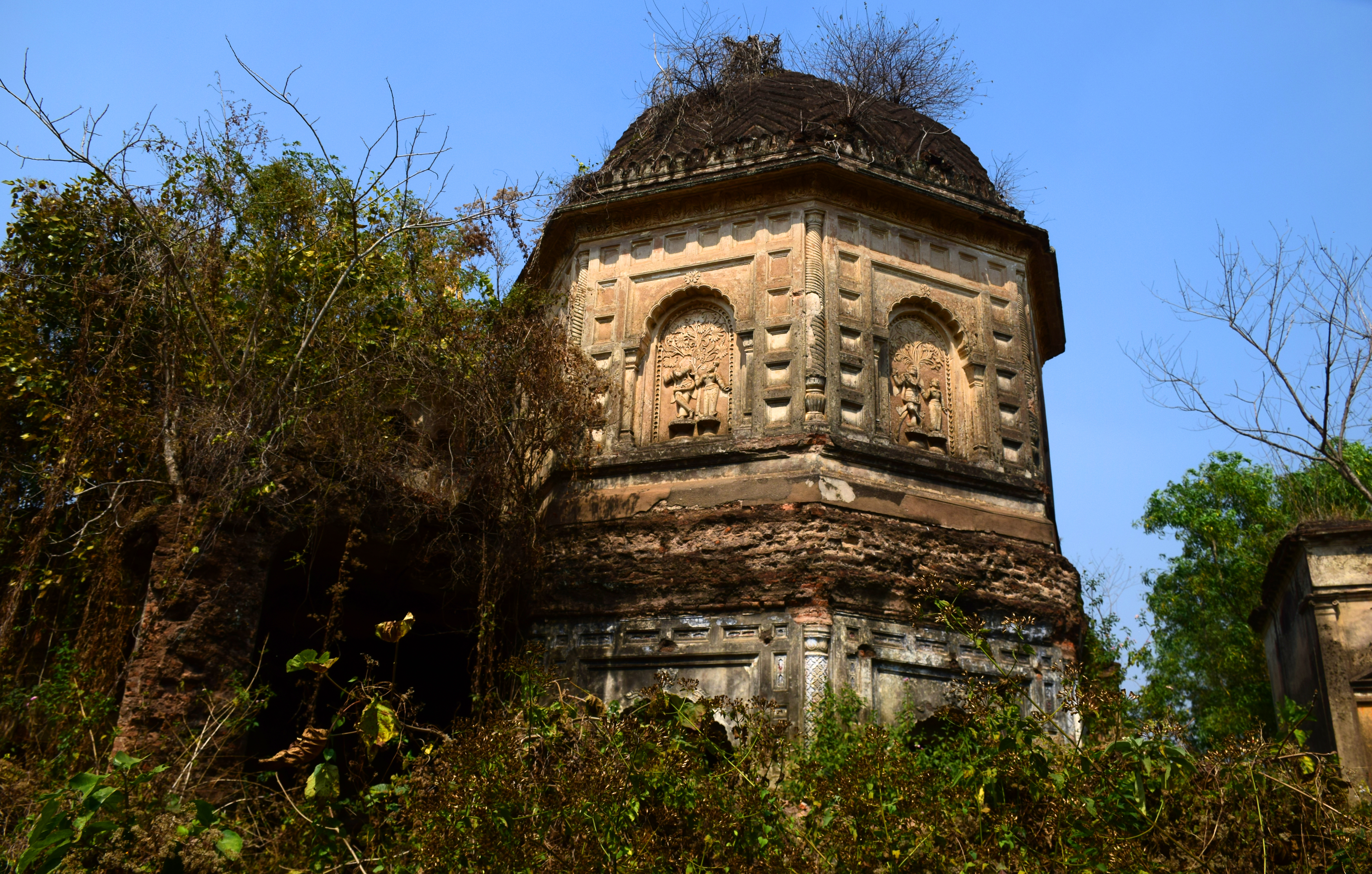
Ruined Radha Ballav temple

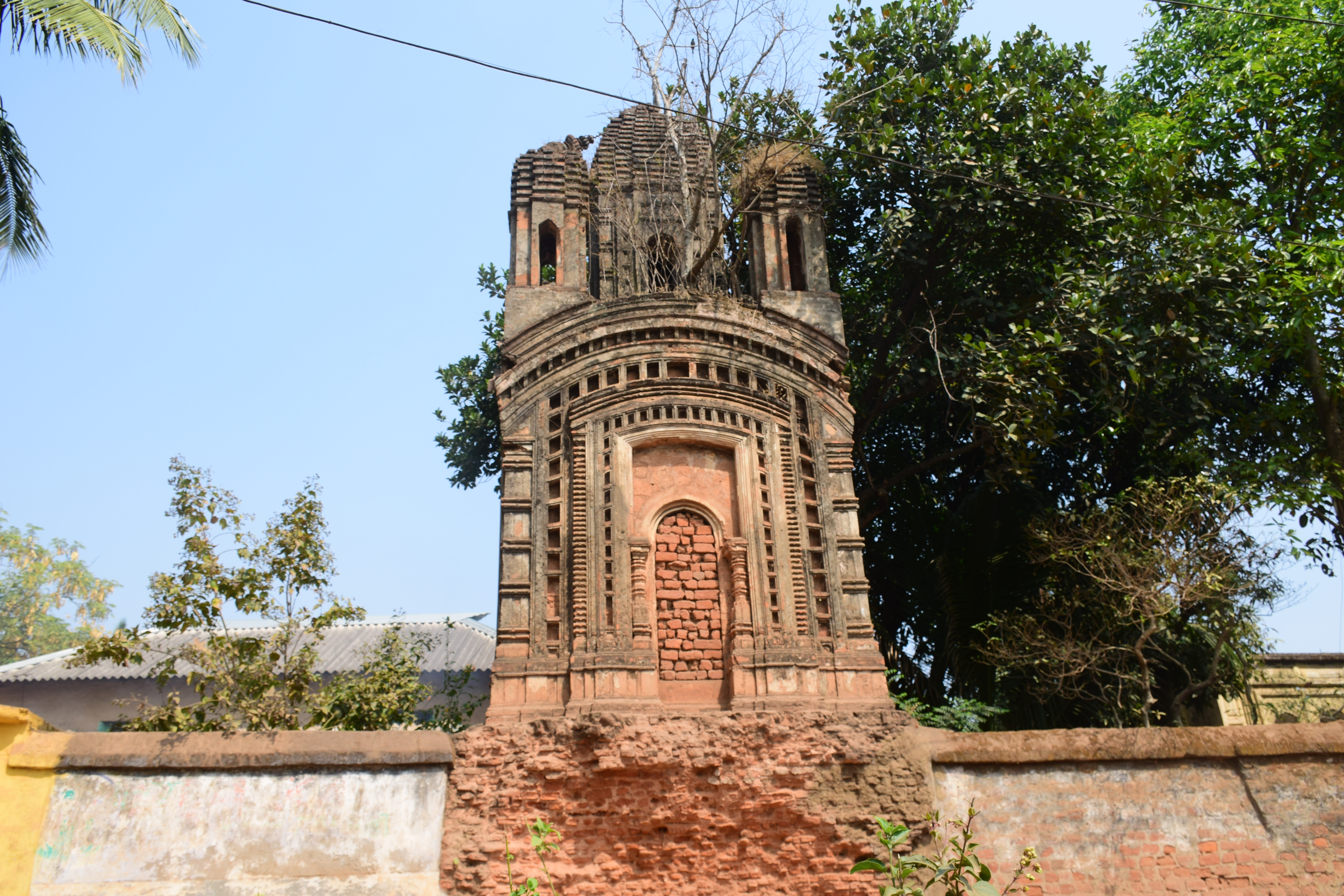
Pancha-ratna Dol Mancha

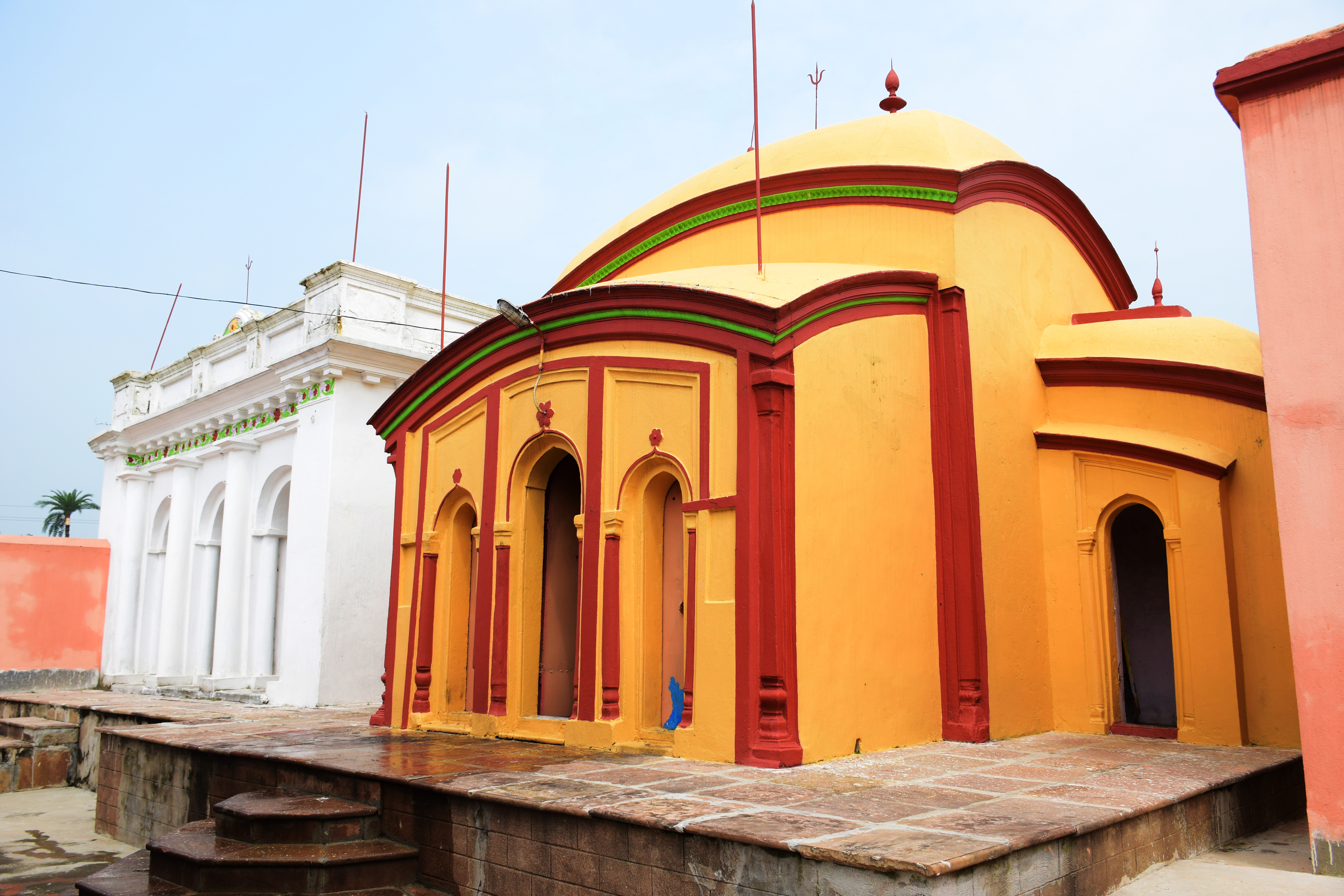
Anandamoyee temple complex

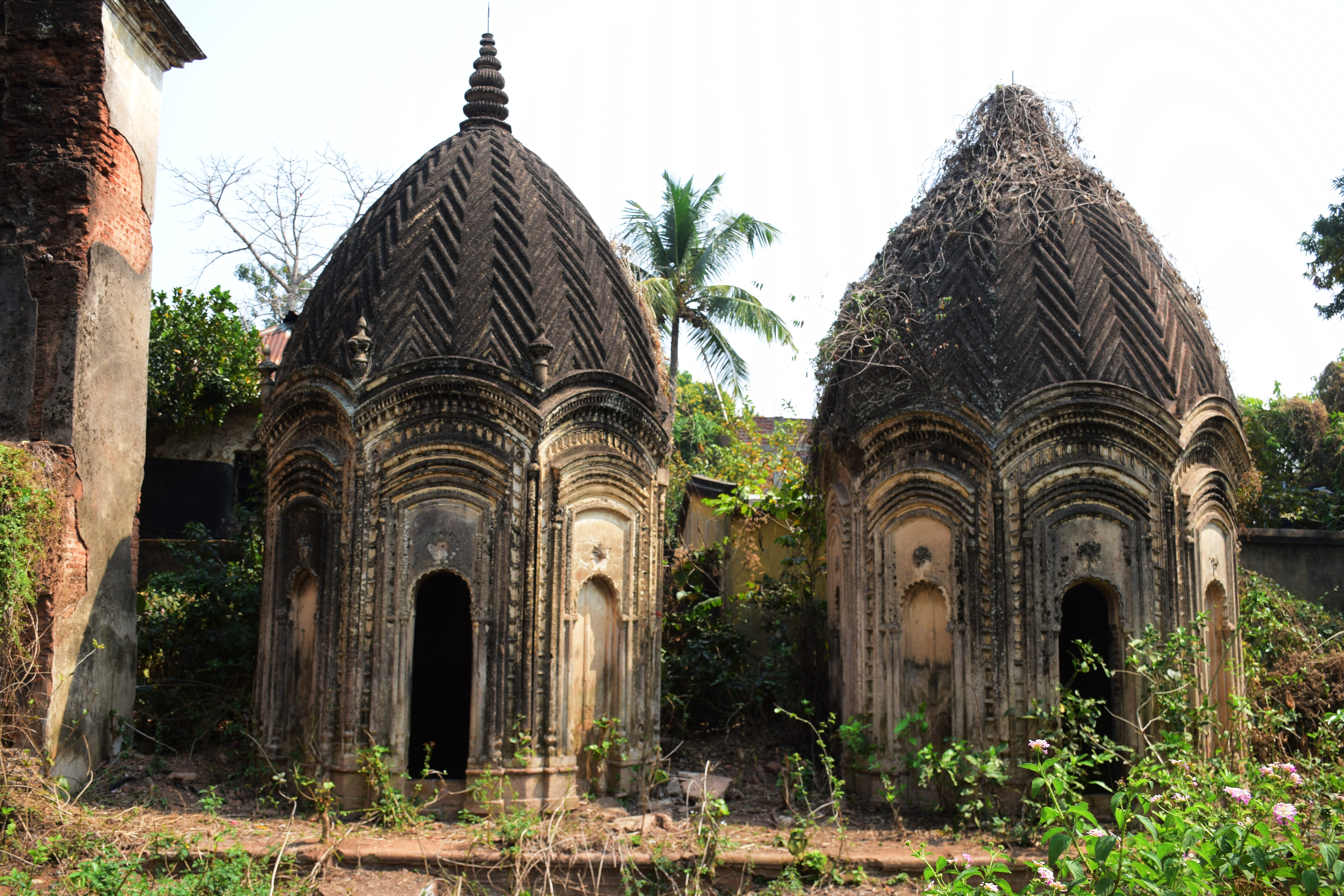
Chala temples in the ruined Rang Mahal complex

== Healthcare ==
Mankar Rural Hospital at Mankar (with 30 beds) and Pursha Rural Hospital at Pursha (with 30 beds) are the main medical facilities in Galsi I CD block. There are primary health centres at: Bharatpur (with 6 beds) and Lowa, PO Dwarmari (with 10 beds).

See also – Healthcare in West Bengal

== External reading ==
- https://sobbanglay.com/sob/mankar/
