= Raina II =

- Community development block
- Location in West Bengal
- Coordinates: 23°00′49″N 87°51′45″E
- Country: India
- State: West Bengal
- District: Purba Bardhaman
- Parliamentary constituency: Bardhaman Purba
- Assembly constituency: Raina

Area
  - Total: 87.75 sq mi (227.28 km^{2})
- Elevation: 82 ft (25 m)

Population (2011)
  - Total: 151,401
  - Density: 1,725.3/sq mi (666.14/km^{2})
- Time zone: UTC+5.30 (IST)
- PIN: 713427 (Uchalan)
- Telephone/STD code: 03211
- Vehicle registration: WB-37,WB-38,WB-41,WB-42,WB-44
- Literacy Rate: 81.48 per cent
- Website: http://purbabardhaman.gov.in/

Raina II (also spelled Rayna and called Rainagar) is a community development block that forms an administrative division in the Bardhaman Sadar South subdivision of the Purba Bardhaman district in the Indian state of West Bengal.

== History ==
=== Movements ===
In 1933, independence activist Dasarathi Tah was involved in Swadeshi dacoities in Meral, Mirzapur and Bogra in the area. Damodar floods wrought havoc in the area and Dasarathi Tah initiated the ‘Nakrah hana embankment movement’ and even published a weekly newspaper named Damodar to focus on the problems faced by the people. In 1948, Raina witnessed the ‘Tebhaga movement’, where sharecroppers demanded a higher share of the crops they grew. The movement was led by Benoy Choudhury and Bipadtaran Roy. Great revolutionary Rashbehari Bose was born in village-Subaldaha, Block-Raina 2, Dist-Purba Bardhaman, West Bengal.

== Geography ==
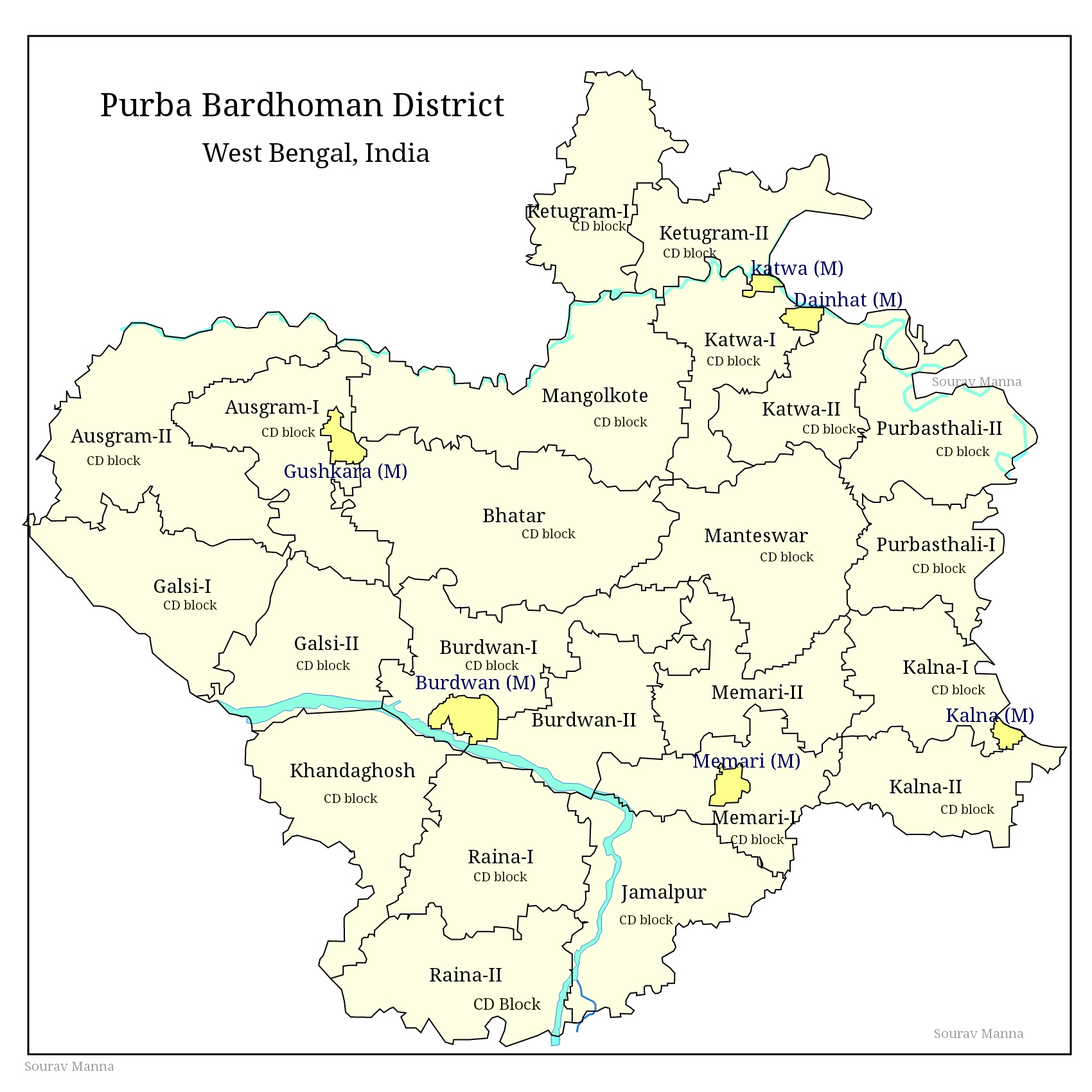
CD blocks of Purba Bardhaman district

=== Location ===
Madhabdihi is located at 23°00′49″N 87°51′45″E. Raina II CD Block is part of the Khandaghosh Plain, which lies in the south-western part of the district, The Damodar flows through the area. The bed of the Damodar is higher than the surrounding areas and the right bank is protected against floods with embankments in portions of the south of the Damodar River. The region has alluvial soil of recent origin. Unlike the rest of Bardhaman district, which lies to the north of the Damodar River, the Khandaghosh-Jamalpur-Raina area lies on the alluvial plains between the Damodar on its northern/ eastern side and the Dwarakeswar River. As a result, it has been a flood prone area.

Raina II CD Block is bounded by Raina I CD Block on the north, Jamalpur CD Block on the east, Pursurah, Aramabgh and Goghat I CD Blocks, in Hooghly district, in the south, and Khandaghosh CD Block on the west.

Raina II CD Block has an area of 227.28 km^{2}. It has 1 panchayat samity, 8 gram panchayats, 119 gram sansads (village councils), 94 mouzas and 87 inhabited villages. Madhabdihi police station serves this block. Headquarters of this CD Block is at Madhabdihi.

It is from this area that the Mundeswari River originates. The small Ratnela khal also originates in the region and later flows into the Ghia river in Hooghly district.

Gram panchayats of Raina II block/panchayat samiti are: Arui, Barabainan, Gotan, Kaity, Pahalanpur, Painta I, Painta I, Painta II and Uchalan.

== Demographics ==
=== Population ===
As per the 2011 Census of India Raina II CD Block had a total population of 151,401, all of which were rural. There were 77,538 (51%) males and 73,863 (49%) females. Population below 6 years was 15,330. Scheduled Castes numbered 61,660 (40.73%) and Scheduled Tribes numbered 6,062 (4.00%).

As per 2001 census, Raina II block had a total population of 137,458, out of which 70,945 were males and 66,513 were females. Raina II block registered a population growth of 12.24 per cent during the 1991-2001 decade. Decadal growth for Bardhaman district was 14.36 per cent. Decadal growth in West Bengal was 17.84 per cent. Scheduled castes at 55,329 formed more than one-third the population. Scheduled tribes numbered 5,644.

Large villages (with 4,000+ population) in Raina II CD Block are (2011 census figures in brackets): Uchalan (7,439), Nandanpur (4,329), Chhota Bainan (6,480), Bara Bainan (6,110), Pahalanpur (4,180), Kamarhati (4,872) and Gotan (4,498).

Other villages in Raina II CD Block include (2011 census figures in brackets): Arui (3,322), Kaiti (2,644), Painta (3,841), Kamargoria (1,378) and Muidhara (1,376).

=== Literacy ===
As per the 2011 census the total number of literates in Raina II CD Block was 110,865 (81.48% of the population over 6 years) out of which males numbered 61,067 (87.69% of the male population over 6 years) and females numbered 49,798 (74.96% of the female population over 6 years). The gender disparity (the difference between female and male literacy rates) was 12.73%.

As per 2001 census, Raina II block had a total literacy of 75.17 per cent for the 6+ age group. While male literacy was 84.18 per cent female literacy was 65.59 per cent. Bardhaman district had a total literacy of 70.18 per cent, male literacy being 78.63 per cent and female literacy being 60.95 per cent.

See also – List of West Bengal districts ranked by literacy rate

Literacy in CD blocks of
Bardhaman district
Bardhaman Sadar North subdivision
Ausgram I – 69.39%
Ausgram II – 68.00%
Bhatar – 71.56%
Burdwan I – 76.07%
Burdwan II – 74.12%
Galsi II – 70.05%
Bardhaman Sadar South subdivision
Khandaghosh – 77.28%
Raina I – 80.20%
Raina II – 81.48%
Jamalpur – 74.08%
Memari I – 74.10%
Memari II – 74.59%
Kalna subdivision
Kalna I – 75.81%
Kalna II – 76.25%
Manteswar – 73.08%
Purbasthali I – 77.59%
Purbasthali II – 70.35%
Katwa subdivision
Katwa I – 70.36%
Katwa II – 69.16%
Ketugram I – 68.00%
Ketugram II – 65.96%
Mongalkote – 67.97%
Durgapur subdivision
Andal – 77.25%
Faridpur Durgapur – 74.14%
Galsi I – 72.81%
Kanksa – 76.34%
Pandabeswar – 73.01%
Asansol subdivision
Barabani – 69.58%
Jamuria – 69.42%
Raniganj – 73.86%
Salanpur – 78.76%
2011 Census: CD Block Wise

Primary Census Abstract Data

=== Languages and religion ===
Religion in Raina II CD block (2011)
Hinduism	82.84%
Islam	16.88%
Other or not stated	0.28%

In the 2011 census Hindus numbered 125,414 and formed 82.84% of the population in Raina II CD Block. Muslims numbered 25,551 and formed 16.88% of the population. Christians numbered 109 and formed 0.07% of the population. Others numbered 327 and formed 0.22% of the population.

In Bardhaman district the percentage of Hindu population has been declining from 84.3% in 1961 to 77.9% in 2011 and the percentage of Muslim population has increased from 15.2% in 1961 to 20.7% in 2011.

Languages of Raina II CD block (2011)
1. Bengali (97.2%)
2. Santali (2.64%)
3. Others (0.13%)

At the time of the 2011 census, 97.23% of the population spoke Bengali and 2.64% Santali as their first language.

== Rural poverty ==
As per poverty estimates obtained from household survey for families living below poverty line in 2005, rural poverty in Raina II CD Block was 28.50%.

== Economy ==
=== Livelihood ===
In Raina II CD Block in 2011, amongst the class of total workers, cultivators formed 20.86%, agricultural labourers 48.66%, household industry workers 1.51% and other workers 20.16%.

Raina II CD Block is part of the area where agriculture dominates the scenario but the secondary and tertiary sectors have shown an increasing trend.

=== Infrastructure ===
There are 87 inhabited villages in Raina II CD block. All 87 villages (100%) have power supply. All 87 villages (100%) have drinking water supply. 21 villages (24.14%) have post offices. 80 villages (91.95%) have telephones (including landlines, public call offices and mobile phones). 49 villages (56.32%) have a pucca (paved) approach road and 66 villages (75.86%) have transport communication (includes bus service, rail facility and navigable waterways). 25 villages (28.74%) have agricultural credit societies. 9 villages (10.34%) have banks.

In 2013-14, there were 90 fertiliser depots, 8 seed stores and 39 fair price shops in the CD Block.

=== Agriculture ===
Persons engaged in agriculture
in Raina II CD Block
1. Bargadars (6.21%)
2. Patta holders (16.6%)
3. Small farmers (7.18%)
4. Marginal farmers (28.3%)
5. Agricultural labourers (41.7%)

Although the Bargadari Act of 1950 recognised the rights of bargadars to a higher share of crops from the land that they tilled, it was not implemented fully. Large tracts, beyond the prescribed limit of land ceiling, remained with the rich landlords. From 1977 onwards major land reforms took place in West Bengal. Land in excess of land ceiling was acquired and distributed amongst the peasants. Following land reforms land ownership pattern has undergone transformation. In 2013-14, persons engaged in agriculture Raina II could be classified as follows: bargadars 6.21%, patta (document) holders 16.64%, small farmers (possessing land between 1 and 2 hectares) 7.18%, marginal farmers (possessing land up to 1 hectare) 28.28% and agricultural labourers 41.69%.

In 2003-04 net cropped area in Raina II Block was 17,262 hectares and the area in which more than one crop was grown was 9,500 hectares.

In 2013-14, Raina II CD Block produced 3,887 tonnes of Aman paddy, the main winter crop, from 1,357 hectares, 17,517 tonnes of Boro paddy (spring crop) from 4,266 hectares, 25 tonnes of wheat from 10 hectares and 81,509 tonnes of potatoes from 4,827 hectares. It also produced pulses and oilseeds.

In Bardhaman district as a whole Aman paddy constituted 64.32% of the total area under paddy cultivation, while the area under Boro and Aus paddy constituted 32.87% and 2.81% respectively. The expansion of Boro paddy cultivation, with higher yield rates, was the result of expansion of irrigation system and intensive cropping. In 2013-14, the total area irrigated in Raina II CD Block was 14,198.79 hectares, out of which 13,180.33 hectares were irrigated by canal water, 226.15 hectares by river lift irrigation and 792.31 hectares by deep tube wells.

=== Banking ===
In 2013-14, Raina II CD Block had offices of 6 commercial banks and 3 gramin banks.

== Transport ==
Raina II CD Block has 3 ferry services and 15 originating/ terminating bus routes.

SH 7 running from Rajgram (in Birbhum district) to Midnapore (in Paschim Medinipur district) passes through this CD Block.

== Education ==
The Raina area had not lagged behind in education. In 1838, a survey by Adams revealed that there were 190 Sanskrit tols in Bardhaman district. Out of this 13 were in Raina. The same report also mentioned Persian schools in the area.

In 2013-14, Raina II CD Block had 113 primary schools with 6,668 students, 7 middle schools with 376 students, 18 high schools with 9,621 students and 10 higher secondary schools with 9,784 students. Raina II CD Block had 1 general college with 683 students, 3 technical/ professional institutes with 1,552 students and 265 institutions for special and non-formal education with 8,154 students.

As per the 2011 census, in Raina II CD block, amongst the 87 inhabited villages, 4 villages did not have schools, 45 villages had two or more primary schools, 36 villages had at least 1 primary and 1 middle school and 30 villages had at least 1 middle and 1 secondary school.

More than 6,000 schools (in erstwhile Bardhaman district) serve cooked midday meal to more than 900,000 students.

Acharya Sukumar Sen Mahavidyalaya has been established in 2013 at Gotan

== Healthcare ==
In 2014, Raina II CD Block had 1 block primary health centre and 5 primary health centres with total 39 beds and 8 doctors (excluding private bodies). It had 21 family welfare subcentres. 2,752 patients were treated indoor and 215,443 patients were treated outdoor in the hospitals, health centres and subcentres of the CD Block.

Madhabdihi Rural Hospital at Madhabdihi, PO Chhoto-bainan (with 30 beds) is the main medical facility in Raina II CD block. There are primary health centres at Binodpur, PO Bajekamarpur (with 2 beds), Gotan (with 6 beds), Kaity (with 10 beds), Painta (with 4 beds) and Subaldaha, PO Barabainan (with 10 beds).

Raina II CD Block is one of the areas of Bardhaman district which is affected by moderately high levels of arsenic contamination of ground water.
