= Sukumar Sen (linguist) =

Indian linguist and historian (1900-1992)

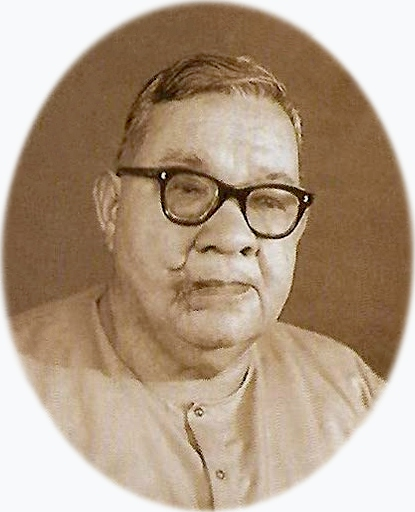
- Born: 16 January 1900; Gotan, Bengal Presidency, British India
- Died: 3 March 1992 (aged 92); Calcutta, West Bengal, India
- Education: Burdwan Raj College

Sukumar Sen (16 January 1900 – 3 March 1992) was an Indian linguist and historian of Bengali literature, who was also well-versed in Pāli, Prakrit and Sanskrit.

== Life ==
Sen was born on 16 January 1900 in a prominent Kayastha family to Harendra Nath Sen, a lawyer and Nabanalini Devi. His hometown was Gotan, near Shyamsundar in the Purba Bardhaman district. Sen was educated at the Burdwan Municipal High School, Burdwan, in 1917. He obtained an F.A. in 1919 from Burdwan Raj College, then affiliated with the University of Calcutta. He received a divisional scholarship and earned first-class honours in Sanskrit from the Government Sanskrit College in 1921. He studied Comparative Philology in Kolkata, scoring the highest marks in 1923. Linguists Suniti Kumar Chatterji and Irach Jehangir Sorabji Taraporewala were his teachers. He received a Premchand Roychand Scholarship and a PhD degree.

Sen retired from the university in 1964.

== Work ==
He joined the University of Calcutta as a lecturer in 1930, where he served as a professor for thirty-four years. He became the second Khaira Professor in the Department of Comparative Philology after his mentor, Suniti Kumar Chatterji, in 1954. After assuming this title, the department attracted many scholars from India and abroad to study and conduct research.

Sen was the first scholar to explore the Old Indo-Aryan syntax in his book, Use of Cases in Vedic Prose (1928), and Buddhist Hybrid Sanskrit (1928). He later analysed the syntax of Middle Indo-Aryan in An Outline of Syntax of Middle Indo-Aryan (1950). He contributed significantly to Bengali literature, addressing themes ranging from mythology, the Puranas and crime to horror. Sen's crime stories were compiled in the book Galpa Samgraha (2009).

He published numerous significant articles and research papers. These include the Bangla Sahityer Itihas (5 Vol 1939, 1991), Bhashar Itibritta (1939, 1993), A History of Brajabuli Literature (1935), A Comparative Grammar of Middle Indo-Aryan (1960), Ramkathar Prak Itihas (1977), Bangla Sthannaam (1982), Bharat Kathar Granthimochan (1981), Bharatiya Arya Sahityer Itihas (1963, 1992) and Women's Dialect in Bengali (1923).

Bhashar Itibritta is the first book in the Bengali language on Indo-Aryan and Indo-European historical linguistics. In this book, he postulated Jharkhandi as the fifth dialect of the Bengali language. His book Bangala Sahitye Gadya (1934) remains the best example of a systematic, stylistic description of the literary dialect of the language. The Etymological Dictionary of Bengali (in two volumes, 1971) is one of the largest works on historical etymology in any Indian language. Bangala Sahityer Itihas was also a monumental contribution. Rabindranath Tagore commended the book and wrote the preface. The English edition was published by the Sahitya Akademi in 1960. Pandit Jawaharlal Nehru wrote the foreword for this book. His autobiography was "Diner Pore Din Je Gelo" (The Days Pass By).

== Recognition ==
The Royal Asiatic Society of London honoured him with a Jubilee Gold Medal in 1984, making him the first Asian to receive the prize. Other prizes include the Rabindra Puraskar (1963), Ananda Puraskar (1966, 1984), Vidyasagar Puraskar (1981), Desikottam (1982), and the Padma Bhushan (1990). The Asiatic Society, Calcutta, awarded him the Jadunath Sarkar Medal. He was elected as an honorary fellow of Sahitya Akademi in 1973.

He received the prestigious Ashutosh Memorial Gold Medal and Griffith Memorial Prize twice. He was also awarded the University Gold Medal and Sarojini Medal.

A college in Gotan was named in his honour.

== Books ==
- Bhashar Itibritta ভাষার ইতিবৃত্ত (বাংলা ভাষাতত্ত্বের একটি পূর্ণাঙ্গ আলোচনা)
- Women's Dialect in Bengali (বাংলা মেয়েলি ভাষা নিয়ে গবেষণামূলক রচনা)
- Bangla sthan nam বাংলা স্থাননাম (বাংলা স্থাননাম নিয়ে ভাষাতাত্ত্বিক ও ঐতিহাসিক বিশ্লেষণ)
- Ram kathar prak itihas রামকথার প্রাক্-ইতিহাস (রামায়ণ-সংক্রান্ত তুলনামূলক পুরাণতাত্ত্বিক আলোচনা)
- Bharat kathar granthi mochan ভারত-কথার গ্রন্থিমোচন (মহাভারত-সংক্রান্ত তুলনামূলক পুরাণতাত্ত্বিক আলোচনা)
- A History of Brajabuli Literature (ব্রজবুলি সাহিত্যের ইতিহাস)
- Bangla sahityer itihas বাঙ্গালা সাহিত্যের ইতিহাস (৫ খণ্ডে, সুকুমার সেনের সবচেয়ে বিখ্যাত বই, বাংলা সাহিত্যের একটি পূর্ণাঙ্গ ও সামগ্রিক ইতিহাস)
- Bangla sahityer katha বাঙ্গালা সাহিত্যের কথা
- Bangla sahitye gadya বাঙ্গালা সাহিত্যে গদ্য
- Banga bhumika বঙ্গভূমিকা (বাংলার আদি-ইতিহাস সংক্রান্ত গ্রন্থ)
- Bangla Islami sahitya বাংলা ইসলামি সাহিত্য
- Diner pare din je gelo দিনের পরে দিন যে গেল ( আত্মজীবনীমূলক রচনা )
- An Outline Syntax of Buddhistic Sanskrit: Being a Contribution to the Historical Syntax of Indo-Aryan, Calcutta University Press (Published:1928)
- The Use of the Cases in Vedic Prose, Bhandarkar Oriental Research Inst. (Published:1930)
- Old Persian Inscriptions of the Achaemenian Emperors, University of Calcutta (Published:1941)
- Vidyāpati-goṣṭhī o gītitriṇśatikā, Sāhitya-sabhā (Published:1948)
- Vipradāsa's Manasā-Vijaya a fifteenth century Bengali text ed. with a summarised transl., notes and glossary and with an introd. on the literature, myth and cults relating to Manasā, Asiatic Soc. (Published:1953)
- A Middle Indo-Aryan Reader Volumes 1-2 (co-author with Suniti Kumar Chatterji), Calcutta Univ. (Published:1960)
- A Comparative Grammar of Middle Indo-Aryan, Linguistic Society of India (Published:1960)
- Upachāẏā, Grantha Prakāśa (Published:1964)
- Paninica, Sanskrit College (Published:1970)
- An Etymological Dictionary of Bengali, C. 1000-1800 A.D., Eastern Publishers (Published:1971)
- Bangabhumika, Eastern Publishers (Published:1974)
- Suniti Kumar Chatterji, Scholar and Virtuoso, Sahitya Akademi (Published:1980)
- Caitanyabhāgabata: bhūmikā, pariśishṭa, ṭippanī, ebaṃ śabdakośa saṃbalita, Sāhitya Akādemī (Published:1982)
- The Great Goddesses in Indic Tradition, Papyrus (Published:1983)
- Padābalīra abhisāra: gānera Śrīkshetre, Bardhamāna Biśvabidyālaẏa (Published:1984)
- Kavikankana Mukunda, Sahitya Akademi (Published:1989)
- History of Bengali Literature, Sahitya Akademi (Published: 1992)
- Chandidas, Sahitya Akademi Publications (Published:1993)
