= Raipur, Purba Bardhaman =

Raipur
- Census Town
- Location in West Bengal, India Raipur (India)
- Coordinates: 23.4183°N 87.5427°E
- Country: India
- State: West Bengal
- District: Purba Bardhaman

Area
  - Total: 3.60 km^{2} (1.39 sq mi)

Population (2011)
  - Total: 5,470
  - Density: 1,520/km^{2} (3,940/sq mi)

Languages
  - Official: Bengali, English
- Time zone: UTC+5:30 (IST)
- Vehicle registration: WB
- Lok Sabha constituency: Bardhaman-Durgapur
- Vidhan Sabha constituency: Galsi
- Website: purbabardhaman.gov.in

Raipur is a census town in Galsi I CD Block in Bardhaman Sadar North subdivision of Purba Bardhaman district in the Indian state of West Bengal.

== Geography ==
Cities and towns in the Bardhaman Sadar North subdivision of Purba Bardhaman district
M: municipal city/ town, CT: census town, R: rural/ urban centre, H: historical site, W: river project, C: craft centre
Owing to space constraints in the small map, the actual locations in a larger map may vary slightly

=== Location ===
Raipur is located at 23.4183°N 87.5427°E.

Raipur is not shown in Google maps. It is shown in the map of Galsi I CD block in the District Census Handbook.

=== Urbanisation ===
73.58% of the population of Bardhaman Sadar North subdivision live in the rural areas. Only 26.42% of the population live in the urban areas, and that is the highest proportion of urban population amongst the four subdivisions in Purba Bardhaman district. The map alongside presents some of the notable locations in the subdivision. All places marked in the map are linked in the larger full screen map.

== Demographics ==
As per the 2011 Census of India, Raipur had a total population of 5,470 of which 2,775 (51%) were males and 2,695 (49%) were females. Population below 6 years was 522. The total number of literates in Raipur was 3,815 (77.10% of the population over 6 years).

== Infrastructure ==
As per the District Census Handbook 2011, Raipur covered an area of 3.5994 km^{2}. It had 6 km roads. Amongst the medical facilities, the nearest nursing home was 40 km away and the nearest veterinary hospital was 40 km away. It had 10 medicine shops. Amongst the educational facilities it had was 3 primary schools. All the other educational facilities were available at Mankar 1 km away. Note: There are major medical facilities at Mankar and Bud Bud.

== Transport ==
Raipur is on State Highway 14.
