= Mehbub Mondal =

Indian politician

West Bengal Legislative Assembly
- In office 1998–2011
- Preceded by: Idrish Mondal
- Succeeded by: Sunil Kumar Mandal
- Constituency: Galsi

Personal details
- Born: May 10, 1967 (age 58)
- Party: All India Trinamool Congress
- Parent: Idrish Mondal (father)
- Education: Burdwan Raj College
- Alma mater: University of Burdwan

Mehbub Mondal (born 10 May 1967) is an Indian politician from West Bengal belonging to All India Trinamool Congress. He is a former member of the West Bengal Legislative Assembly.

== Early life and family ==
Mondal was born on 10 May 1967 a Bengali family of Muslim Mondals in Galsi, Bardhaman, West Bengal. He was the son of MLA Idrish Mondal and Mahatabun Nesa Bibi. Mondal completed his education from Burdwan Raj Collegiate School and Burdwan Raj College. He graduated with a Bachelor of Science degree in mathematics and Bachelor of Education from the University of Burdwan.

== Career ==
Mondal was elected as a legislator of the West Bengal Legislative Assembly as an All India Forward Bloc candidate from Galsi in a bye-election on 3 May 1998. He was re-elected in 2001. He was also elected from Galsi in 2006, and later became a member on the Standing Committee on Health & Family Welfare. He joined All India Trinamool Congress on 9 September 2016.
