= Sukdal =

- Census Town
- Location in West Bengal, India Sukdal (India)
- Coordinates: 23.397922°N 87.557149°E
- Country: India
- State: West Bengal
- District: Purba Bardhaman

Area
  - Total: 4.57 km^{2} (1.76 sq mi)

Population (2011)
  - Total: 13,093
  - Density: 2,860/km^{2} (7,420/sq mi)

Languages
  - Official: Bengali, English
- Time zone: UTC+5:30 (IST)
- Vehicle registration: WB
- Website: purbabardhaman.gov.in

Sukdal is a census town in Galsi I CD Block in Bardhaman Sadar North subdivision of Purba Bardhaman district in the Indian state of West Bengal.

== Geography ==
Cities and towns in the Bardhaman Sadar North subdivision of Purba Bardhaman district
M: municipal city/ town, CT: census town, R: rural/ urban centre, H: historical site, W: river project, C: craft centre
Owing to space constraints in the small map, the actual locations in a larger map may vary slightly

=== Location ===
Sukdal is located in the laterite plains between Damodar River and Ajay River. Khari or Khargeswari River flows through the area. It is believed that the river was earlier linked with the Damodar.

=== Urbanisation ===
73.58% of the population of Bardhaman Sadar North subdivision live in the rural areas. Only 26.42% of the population live in the urban areas, and that is the highest proportion of urban population amongst the four subdivisions in Purba Bardhaman district. The map alongside presents some of the notable locations in the subdivision. All places marked in the map are linked in the larger full screen map.

== Demographics ==
As per the 2011 Census of India Sukdal had a total population of 13,093, of which 6,731 (51%) were males and 6,362 (49%) were females. Population below 6 years was 1,159. The total number of literates in Sukdal was 10,441 (87.49% of the population over 6 years).

As of 2001 India census, Sukdal had a population of 11,785. Males constitute 53% of the population and females 47%. Sukdal has an average literacy rate of 74%, higher than the national average of 59.5%: male literacy is 80%, and female literacy is 67%. In Sukdal, 10% of the population is under 6 years of age.

== Infrastructure ==
As per the District Census Handbook 2011, Sukdal covered an area of 4.57 km^{2}. It had 32 km roads. Amongst the medical facilities, the nearest nursing home was 1 km away and the nearest veterinary hospital was 40 km away. It had 1 medicine shop. Amongst the educational facilities it had was 6 primary schools, 1 middle school, 1 secondary school and 1 senior secondary school. The nearest degree college was at Mankar 5 km away.

== Education ==
Sukdal has five primary and one secondary schools.
