= Raju Patra =

Indian politician (born 1991)

Raju Patra (born 1991) is an Indian politician from West Bengal. He is a member of West Bengal Legislative Assembly from the Galsi Assembly constituency, which is reserved for Scheduled Caste community, in Purba Bardhaman district representing the Bharatiya Janata Party.

== Early life and education ==
Patra is from Galsi, Purba Bardhaman district, West Bengal. He is the son of Shrikanta Patra. He studied at Uchachagram High School, Galsi, Purba Bardhaman, and passed Class 8 examinations in 2006. He runs his own business. He declared assets Rs.20 lakhs in his affidavit to the Election Commission of India.

== Career ==
Patra won the Galsi Assembly constituency representing the Bharatiya Janata Party in the 2026 West Bengal Legislative Assembly election. He polled 1,10,640 votes and defeated his nearest rival, Alok Kumar Majhi of the All India Trinamool Congress (AITC), by a margin of 10,494 votes.
