= Galsi I =

- Community development block
- Location in West Bengal
- Coordinates: 23°24′30″N 87°32′34″E
- Country: India
- State: West Bengal
- District: Purba Bardhaman
- Parliamentary constituency: Bardhaman-Durgapur
- Assembly constituency: Galsi

Area
  - Total: 99.37 sq mi (257.37 km^{2})
- Elevation: 213 ft (65 m)

Population (2011)
  - Total: 187,588
  - Density: 1,887.8/sq mi (728.87/km^{2})
- Time zone: UTC+5.30 (IST)
- PIN: 713403 (Bud Bud); 713144 (Mankar)
- Telephone/STD code: 03452
- Vehicle registration: WB-37,WB-38,WB-41,WB-42,WB-44
- Literacy Rate: 72.87 per cent
- Website: http://purbabardhaman.gov.in/

Galsi I is a community development block that forms an administrative division in Bardhaman Sadar North subdivision of Purba Bardhaman district in the Indian state of West Bengal.

== Geography ==
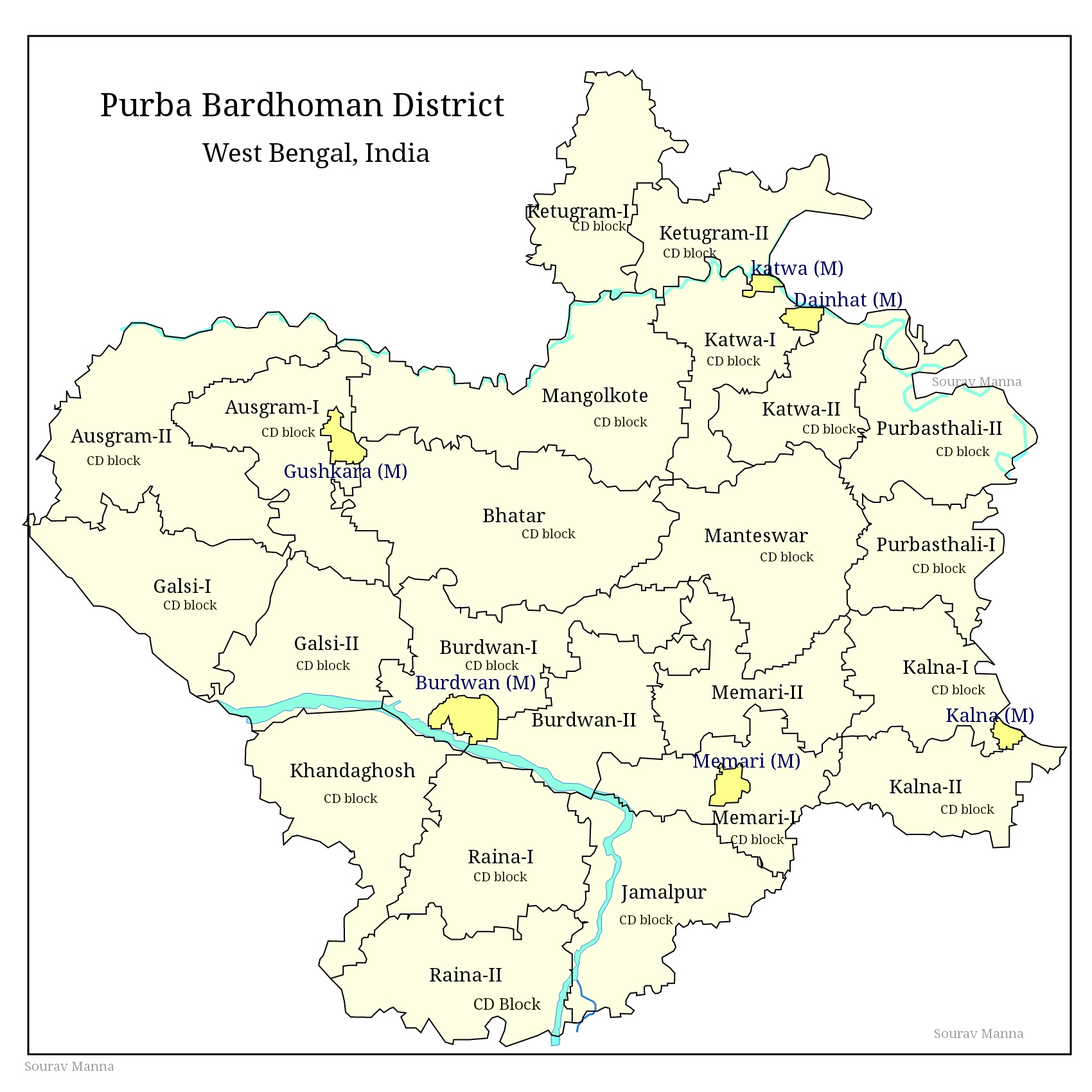
CD blocks of Purba Bardhaman district

=== Location ===
Bud Bud, a constituent gram panchayat in Galsi I CD Block, is located at 23°24′30″N 87°32′34″E. Galsi I CD Block is part of the Bardhaman Plain, the central plain area of the district. The area is surrounded by the Bhagirathi on the east, the Ajay on the north-west and the Damodar on the west and south. Old river channels and small creeks found in the region dry up in the dry season, but the Bardhaman Plains are sometimes subject to heavy floods during the rainy season. The region has recent alluvial soils.

Galsi I CD Block is bounded by Ausgram II CD Block on the north, Galsi II CD Block on the east, Sonamukhi and Patrasayer CD Blocks, in Bankura district, on the south and Kanksa CD Block on the west.

Galsi I CD Block has an area of 257.37 km^{2}. It has 1 panchayat samity, 9 gram panchayats, 141 gram sansads (village councils), 87 mouzas and 85 inhabited villages. Bud Bud and Galsi police stations serve this block. Headquarters of this CD Block is at Bud Bud.

Gram panchayats of Galsi I block/panchayat samiti are: Bud Bud, Chaktentul, Loapur Krishnarampur, Lowa Ramgopalpur, Mankar, Paraj, Potna-Pursa, Serorai and Uchchagram.

== Demographics ==
=== Population ===
As per the 2011 Census of India Galsi I CD Block had a total population of 187,588, of which 164,467 were rural and 23,121 were urban. There were 96,755 (52%) males and 90,833 (48%) females. Population below 6 years was 19,421. Scheduled Castes numbered 67,044 (35.74%) and Scheduled Tribes numbered 7,652 (4.08%).

As per 2001 census, Galsi I block had a total population of 174,070, out of which 90,518 were males and 83,552 were females. Galsi I block registered a population growth of 17.76 per cent during the 1991-2001 decade. Decadal growth for Bardhaman district was 14.36 per cent. Decadal growth in West Bengal was 17.84 per cent. Scheduled castes at 61,523 formed around one-third the population. Scheduled tribes numbered 7,187.

Census Towns in Galsi I CD Block are (2011 census figures in brackets): Raipur (5,470), Sukdal (13,093) and Bud Bud (4,558).

Large villages (with 4,000+ population) in Galsi I CD Block are (2011 census figures in brackets): Bharatpur (4,274), Chak Tentul (4,841), Mankar (10,370), Paraj (5,560), Ramgopalpur (4,362), Mallasarul (4,439), Sirarai (6,915), Pursha (5,740), Kolkol (4,025), Uchchagram (4,887) and Golgram (4,886).

Other villages in Galsi I CD Block include (2011census figures in brackets): Loa (3,690), Loapur (1,987), Krishnarampur (3,627), Randiha (1953), Potna (1,873), Shillya (1,272), Kasba (2,119).

=== Literacy ===
As per the 2011 census the total number of literates in Galsi I CD Block was 122,540 (72.87% of the population over 6 years) out of which males numbered 69,370 (79.89% of the male population over 6 years) and females numbered 53,170 (65.37% of the female population over 6 years). The gender disparity (the difference between female and male literacy rates) was 14.52%.

As per 2001 census, Galsi I block had a total literacy of 65.71 per cent for the 6+ age group. While male literacy was 74.98 per cent female literacy was 55.63 per cent. Bardhaman district had a total literacy of 76.21 per cent, male literacy being 71.7 per cent and female literacy being 58.54 per cent.

See also – List of West Bengal districts ranked by literacy rate

Literacy in CD blocks of
Bardhaman district
Bardhaman Sadar North subdivision
Ausgram I – 69.39%
Ausgram II – 68.00%
Bhatar – 71.56%
Burdwan I – 76.07%
Burdwan II – 74.12%
Galsi II – 70.05%
Bardhaman Sadar South subdivision
Khandaghosh – 77.28%
Raina I – 80.20%
Raina II – 81.48%
Jamalpur – 74.08%
Memari I – 74.10%
Memari II – 74.59%
Kalna subdivision
Kalna I – 75.81%
Kalna II – 76.25%
Manteswar – 73.08%
Purbasthali I – 77.59%
Purbasthali II – 70.35%
Katwa subdivision
Katwa I – 70.36%
Katwa II – 69.16%
Ketugram I – 68.00%
Ketugram II – 65.96%
Mongalkote – 67.97%
Durgapur subdivision
Andal – 77.25%
Faridpur Durgapur – 74.14%
Galsi I – 72.81%
Kanksa – 76.34%
Pandabeswar – 73.01%
Asansol subdivision
Barabani – 69.58%
Jamuria – 69.42%
Raniganj – 73.86%
Salanpur – 78.76%
2011 Census: CD Block Wise

Primary Census Abstract Data

=== Languages and religion ===
Religion in Galsi I CD block (2011)
Hinduism	71.69%
Islam	27.75%
Other or not stated	0.56%

In the 2011 census, Hindus numbered 134,475 and formed 71.69% of the population in Galsi I CD Block. Muslims numbered 52,053 and formed 27.75% of the population. Christians numbered 475 and formed 0.25% of the population. Others numbered 585 and formed 0.31% of the population.

In Bardhaman district, the percentage of Hindu population has been declining from 84.3% in 1961 to 77.9% in 2011 and the percentage of Muslim population has increased from 15.2% in 1961 to 20.7% in 2011.

Languages of Galsi I CD block (2011)
1. Bengali (90.9%)
2. Hindi (4.53%)
3. Santali (3.29%)
4. Others (1.24%)

At the time of the 2011 census, 90.94% of the population spoke Bengali, 4.53% Hindi and 3.29% Santali as their first language.

== Rural poverty ==
As per poverty estimates obtained from household survey for families living below poverty line in 2005, rural poverty in Galsi I CD Block was 37.76%.

== Economy ==
=== Livelihood ===
In Galsi I CD Block in 2011, amongst the class of total workers, cultivators formed 15.32%, agricultural labourers 55.13%, household industry workers 1.66% and other workers 27.89%.

Galsi I CD Block is part of the area where agriculture dominates the scenario but the secondary and tertiary sectors have shown an increasing trend.

=== Infrastructure ===
There are 85 inhabited villages in Galsi I CD block. All 85 villages (100%) have power supply. All 85 villages (100%) have drinking water supply. 19 villages (22.35%) have post offices. 81 villages (95.29%) have telephones (including landlines, public call offices and mobile phones). 28 villages (32.94%) have a pucca (paved) approach road and 53 villages (62.35%) have transport communication (includes bus service, rail facility and navigable waterways). 10 villages (11.76%) have agricultural credit societies. 5 villages (5.88%) have banks.

In 2013-14, there were 73 fertiliser depots, 6 seed stores and 75 fair price shops in the CD Block.

=== Agriculture ===
Persons engaged in agriculture
in Galsi I CD Block
1. Bargadars (8.11%)
2. Patta holders (9.36%)
3. Small farmers (2.77%)
4. Marginal farmers (10.8%)
5. Agricultural labourers (69.0%)

Although the Bargadari Act of 1950 recognised the rights of bargadars to a higher share of crops from the land that they tilled, it was not implemented fully. Large tracts, beyond the prescribed limit of land ceiling, remained with the rich landlords. From 1977 onwards major land reforms took place in West Bengal. Land in excess of land ceiling was acquired and distributed amongst the peasants. Following land reforms land ownership pattern has undergone transformation. In 2013-14, persons engaged in agriculture in Galsi I CD Block could be classified as follows: bargadars 8.11%, patta (document) holders 9.36%, small farmers (possessing land between 1 and 2 hectares) 2.77%, marginal farmers (possessing land up to 1 hectare) 10.78% and agricultural labourers 68.98%.

In 2003-04 net cropped area in Galsi I CD Block was 17,379 hectares and the area in which more than one crop was grown was 17,404 hectares.

In 2013-14, Galsi I CD Block produced 4,939 tonnes of Aman paddy, the main winter crop, from 1,911 hectares, 30,343 tonnes of Boro paddy (spring crop) from 9,982 hectares, 13 tonnes of wheat from 5 hectares and 15,754 tonnes of potatoes from 840 hectares. It also produced pulses and oilseeds.

In Bardhaman district as a whole Aman paddy constituted 64.32% of the total area under paddy cultivation, while the area under Boro and Aus paddy constituted 32.87% and 2.81% respectively. The expansion of Boro paddy cultivation, with higher yield rates, was the result of expansion of irrigation system and intensive cropping. In 2013-14, the total area irrigated in Galsi I CD Block was 19,174.59 hectares, out of which 18,835.75 hectares were irrigated by canal water and 338.84 hectares by deep tube wells.

Various developmental activity like Direct Benefit Transfer of assistance to Krishak Bandhu beneficiaries, Crop Demonstration, Awaring farmers of technical know-how, information dissemination by A.T.M.A. etc. has been started with a new approach from mid-April 2020. A widely successful KCC Camp was organised in June 2020 by the office of the Asst. Director of Agriculture, Galsi I block, which is being much appreciated by the farming community of the block. The number of complaints in grievance cell has decreased to a large extent which proves a new sense of confidence and hope among farmers increasing the scope of profitability in Agriculture for this block. Many experts believe that Galsi I has the potential to be one of the leading blocks in agricultural production and productivity and is currently among the top three performing block in the Purba Bardhaman district.

=== Banking ===
In 2013-14, Galsi I CD Block had offices of 7 commercial banks and 4 gramin banks.

== Transport ==
Galsi I CD Block has 17 originating/ terminating bus routes.

The Bardhaman-Asansol section, which is a part of Howrah-Gaya-Delhi line, Howrah-Allahabad-Mumbai line and Howrah-Delhi main line, passes through this CD Block and there are stations at Mankar and Paraj.

NH 19 (old numbering NH 2)/ Grand Trunk Road passes through this CD Block.

== Education ==
In 2013-14, Galsi I CD Block had 116 primary schools with 11,593 students, 3 middle schools with 234 students, 14 high schools with 8,967 students and 8 higher secondary schools with 7,056 students. Galsi I CD Block had 1 general college with 1,997 students and 296 institutions for special and non-formal education with 8,949 students

As per the 2011 census, in Galsi I CD block, amongst the 85 inhabited villages, 6 villages did not have schools, 32 villages had two or more primary schools, 25 villages had at least 1 primary and 1 middle school and 19 villages had at least 1 middle and 1 secondary school.

More than 6,000 schools (in erstwhile Bardhaman district) serve cooked midday meal to more than 900,000 students.

Kanad Institute of Engineering and Management was established at Mankar in 2008. It is affiliated with Maulana Abul Kalam Azad University of Technology.

Mankar College at Mankar was established in 1987. It is affiliated with Kazi Nazrul University.

== Culture ==
There are several temples, with varied pattern of construction, at Mankar. Some of these temples have terracotta carvings.

== Healthcare ==
In 2014, Galsi I CD Block had 1 rural hospital, 1 block primary health centre, 2 primary health centres and 2 private nursing homes with total 63 beds and 7 doctors (excluding private bodies). It had 27 family welfare subcentres. 6,814 patients were treated indoor and 311,671 patients were treated outdoor in the hospitals, health centres and subcentres of the CD Block.

Mankar Rural Hospital at Mankar (with 30 beds) and Pursha Rural Hospital at Pursha (with 30 beds) are the main medical facilities in Galsi I CD block. There are primary health centres at: Bharatpur (with 6 beds) and Lowa, PO Dwarmari (with 10 beds).

Galsi I CD Block is one of the areas of Purba Bardhaman district which is affected by a low level of arsenic contamination of ground water.
