= Idrish Mondal =

West Bengal politician

Member of West Bengal Legislative Assembly
- In office 1991–1998
- Preceded by: Devaranjan Sen
- Succeeded by: Mehbub Mondal
- Constituency: Galsi

Personal details
- Born: Galsi, Bardhaman, West Bengal
- Party: All India Forward Bloc
- Children: Mehbub Mondal

Idrish Mondal is an Indian politician belonging to the All India Forward Bloc. He was the MLA of Galsi Assembly constituency in the West Bengal Legislative Assembly.

== Early life and family ==
Mondal was born into a Bengali family of Muslim Mondals in Galsi, Bardhaman, West Bengal. He married Mahatabun Nesa Bibi. Their son Mehbub Mondal is also a politician.

== Career ==
Mondal contested in the 1991 West Bengal Legislative Assembly election where he ran as an All India Forward Bloc candidate for Galsi Assembly constituency. He was re-elected from the same constituency at the 1996 West Bengal Legislative Assembly election.
