= Nepal Ghorui =

Indian politician

Member of the West Bengal Legislative Assembly
- In office 2 May 2021 – 4 May 2026
- Preceded by: Alok Kumar Majhi
- Succeeded by: Raju Patra
- Constituency: Galsi

Personal details
- Party: AITC
- Profession: Politician

Nepal Ghorui is an Indian politician member of All India Trinamool Congress. He is an MLA, elected from the Galsi constituency in the 2021 West Bengal Legislative Assembly election.
