= Raina Assembly constituency =

Raina
- Constituency No. 261 for the West Bengal Legislative Assembly
- Interactive Map Outlining Raina Assembly Constituency

Constituency details
- Country: India
- Region: East India
- State: West Bengal
- District: Purba Bardhaman
- Lok Sabha constituency: Bardhaman Purba
- Established: 1951
- Total electors: 209,643
- Reservation: SC

Member of Legislative Assembly
- 18th West Bengal Legislative Assembly
- Incumbent Subhash Patra
- Party: BJP
- Alliance: NDA
- Elected year: 2026

Raina Assembly constituency is an assembly constituency in Purba Bardhaman district in the Indian state of West Bengal. It is reserved for scheduled castes.

== Overview ==
As per orders of the Delimitation Commission, No. 261 Raina (SC) assembly constituency covers Raina II community development block and Hijalna, Natu, Palsona, Sehara, Narugram, Shyamsundar, and Rayna gram panchayats of Raina I community development block.

As per orders of Delimitation Commission it is part of No. 38 Bardhaman Purba Lok Sabha constituency. Raina assembly segment was earlier part of Burdwan Lok Sabha constituency.

== Members of the Legislative Assembly ==
Year	Name	Party
1951	Mrityunjoy Pramanick	Kisan Mazdoor Praja Party
1951	Dasarathi Tah	Kisan Mazdoor Praja Party
1957	Dasarathi Tah	Praja Socialist Party
1957	Gobardhan Pakray	Praja Socialist Party
1962	Probodh Kumar Guha	Indian National Congress
1967	Dasarathi Tah	Praja Socialist Party
1969	Panchu Gopal Guha	Communist Party of India (Marxist)
1971	Gokulananda Roy	Communist Party of India (Marxist)
1972	Sukumar Chattopadhyay	Indian National Congress
1977	Ram Narayan Goswami	Communist Party of India (Marxist)
1982	Dhirendra Nath Chatterjee	Communist Party of India (Marxist)
1987	Dhirendra Nath Chatterjee	Communist Party of India (Marxist)
1991	Dhirendra Nath Chatterjee	Communist Party of India (Marxist)
1996	Shyamaprasad Pal	Communist Party of India (Marxist)
2001	Shyamaprasad Pal	Communist Party of India (Marxist)
2006	Swapan Samanta	Communist Party of India (Marxist)
2011	Basudeb Khan	Communist Party of India (Marxist)
2016	Nepal Ghorui	Trinamool Congress
2021	Shampa Dhara	Trinamool Congress
2026	Subhash Patra	Bharatiya Janata Party

== Election results ==
=== 2026 ===
2026 West Bengal Legislative Assembly election: Raina
Party	Candidate	Votes	%	±%
BJP	Subhash Patra	103,487	44.37	▲4.86
AITC	Mandira Dalui	102,653	44.01	▼3.45
CPI(M)	Somnath Maji	19,674	8.43	▼2.62
NOTA	None of the above	1,442	0.62	▼0.06
Majority		834	0.36	▼7.59
Turnout		233,245	94.72	▲6.15
BJP gain from AITC		Swing		

=== 2021 ===
2021 West Bengal Legislative Assembly election: Raina
Party	Candidate	Votes	%	±%
AITC	Shampa Dhara	108,752	47.46	▲1.69
BJP	Manik Roy	90,547	39.51	▲32.43
CPI(M)	Basudeb Khan	25,332	11.05	▼34.5
NOTA	None of the above	1,563	0.68	
Majority		18,205	7.95	
Turnout		229,166	88.57	
AITC hold		Swing		

=== 2016 ===
2016 West Bengal Legislative Assembly election: Raina
Party	Candidate	Votes	%	±%
AITC	Nepal Ghorui	94,323	45.77	▲0.97
CPI(M)	Basudeb Khan	93,875	45.55	▼5.57
BJP	Kashinath Patra	14,589	7.08	▲5.40
NOTA	None of the above	3,306	1.60	New entry
Majority		448	0.22	▼6.10
Turnout		2,06,093	87.61	▼4.63
AITC gain from CPI(M)		Swing		

=== 2011 ===
2011 West Bengal Legislative Assembly election: Raina
Party	Candidate	Votes	%	±%
CPI(M)	Basudeb Khan	98,897	51.12	
AITC	Nepal Ghorui	86,676	44.80	
BJP	Pandit Krishna Chandra	3,241	1.68	
PDCI	Asit Rana	2,611	1.35	
BSP	Protul Biswas	1,024	0.53	
JDP	Adhir Roy	1,004	0.52	
Majority		12,221	6.32	
Turnout		1,93,453	92.24	
CPI(M) hold		Swing		

=== 2006 ===
Swapan Samanta of CPI(M) won the Raina assembly seat in 2006 defeating his nearest rival Nityananda Tah of Trinamool Congress. Contests in most years were multi cornered but only winners and runners are being mentioned. In 2001 and 1996, Shyamaprosad Pal of CPI(M) defeated Arup Kumar Das of Trinamool Congress and Arabinda Bhattacharyya of Congress, in the respective years. In 1991, 1987 and 1982, Dhirendranath Chatterjee of CPI(M) defeated Sunil Das, Uday Sankar Sain and Sukumar Chattopadhyay, all of Congress, in the respective years. In 1977, Ram Narayan Goswami of CPI(M) defeated Ajit Krishna Bhattacharya of Congress.

=== 1972 ===
Sukumar Chattopadhyay of Congress won the seat in 1972, and in 1971, it was won by Gokulananda Roy of CPI(M). Panchu Gopal Guha of CPI(M) won it in 1969, and Dasarathi Tah of PSP won it in 1967. Prabodh Kumar Guha of Congress won the seat in 1962. It was a double member seat in 1957 and 1951. In 1957, Dasarathi Tah and Gobardhan Pakray, both representing PSP, won the seats. In the first state assembly elections after independence in 1951, Dasarathi Tah and Mritunjoy Pramanik, both representing KMPP, won the Raina seats.
