= Dasarathi Tah =

Indian politician and journalist

Politician, journalist
- Constituency: Raina

Personal details
- Born: 23.7.1318 Bengali era (1911 Christian era)
- Died: 14.1.1387 Bengali era (1980 Christian era)
- Spouse: Roma Tah

Dasarathi Tah (1911–1980) was a politician and journalist in the Indian state of West Bengal.

== Early life ==
Dasarathi Tah did not have the benefit of any formal education and was a completely self-educated person. Politically inclined from his younger days, he joined the Congress Party in 1930 and actively participated in many political movements such as the Salt Satyagraha, personal satyagraha, flood prevention in the Damodar, and the canal movement. During the Quit India Movement he was involved in the occupation of Jamalpur police station. He was sent to jail several times for his political activities.

== Elections ==
He won elections to the West Bengal state assembly from Raina constituency in 1951, 1957 and 1967. While he contested on a Kisan Mazdoor Praja Party ticket in 1951, he fought the other elections on a Praja Socialist Party ticket.

== Journalist ==
Dasarathi Tah was a pioneering journalist. He edited and published the weekly Damodar before independence and then started the daily Damodar after independence. Both were the earliest in their category in Bardhaman district.
