= Subhash Patra =

Indian politician (born 1989)

Subhash Patra (born 1989) is an Indian politician from West Bengal. He is a member of West Bengal Legislative Assembly from the Raina Assembly constituency, which is reserved for Scheduled Caste community, in Purba Bardhaman district representing the Bharatiya Janata Party.

== Early life ==
Patra is from Raina, Purba Bardhaman district, West Bengal. He is the son of Kashinath Patra. He completed his M.A. in Bengali at Burdwan University in 2012. He runs his own business. He declared assets worth Rs.6 lakhs in his affidavit to the Election Commission of India.

== Career ==
Patra won the Raina Assembly constituency representing the Bharatiya Janata Party in the 2026 West Bengal Legislative Assembly election. He polled 1,03,487 votes and defeated his nearest rival, Mandira Dalui of the All India Trinamool Congress (AITC), by a margin of 834 votes.
