= Gotan =

- Village
- Location in West Bengal, India Gotan (India)
- Coordinates: 22.979611°N 87.92585°E
- Country: India
- State: West Bengal
- District: Purba Bardhaman

Population (2011)
  - Total: 4,458

Languages
  - Official: Bengali, English
- Time zone: UTC+5:30 (IST)
- Telephone/STD code: 03211
- Lok Sabha constituency: Bardhaman Purba
- Vidhan Sabha constituency: Raina
- Website: purbabardhaman.gov.in

Gotan is a village in Raina II, a CD block in Bardhaman Sadar South subdivision of Purba Bardhaman district in the state of West Bengal, India.

== Geography ==
Cities and towns in the Bardhaman Sadar South subdivision of Purba Bardhaman district
M: municipal city/ town, CT: census town, R: rural/ urban centre, H: historical/ religious centre.
Owing to space constraints in the small map, the actual locations in a larger map may vary slightly

=== Urbanisation ===
95.54% of the population of Bardhaman Sadar South subdivision live in the rural areas. Only 4.46% of the population live in the urban areas, and that is the lowest proportion of urban population amongst the four subdivisions in Purba Bardhaman district. The map alongside presents some of the notable locations in the subdivision. All places marked in the map are linked in the larger full screen map.

=== Location ===
22.979611°N 87.92585°E.

== Demographics ==
As per the 2011 Census of India Gotan had a total population of 4,458, of which 2,246 (50%) were males and 2,212 (50%) were females. Population below 6 years was 492. The total number of literates in Gotan was 2,882 (72.67% of the population over 6 years).

== Transport ==
Gotan is on Kabikankan Mukundaram Road running from Raina to State Highway 2 (West Bengal) (also known as Ahalyabai Holkar Road in the area).

== Education ==
Acharya Sukumar Sen Mahavidyalaya was established at Gotan in 2013.

Gotan Subodh Memorial High School is a coeducational high school affiliated with the West Board of Secondary Education. It is also affiliated with West Bengal Council of Higher Secondary Education for higher secondary classes.

== Healthcare ==
There is a primary health centre at Gotan (with 6 beds).
