= Alok Kumar Majhi =

Indian politician

Member of the West Bengal Legislative Assembly
- In office 2 May 2021 – 3 May 2026
- Preceded by: Sudarsan Ray Choudhury
- Constituency: Jamalpur

Personal details
- Party: AITC
- Profession: Politician

Alok Kumar Majhi is an Indian politician member of All India Trinamool Congress. He is an MLA, elected from the Jamalpur constituency in the 2021 West Bengal Legislative Assembly election.
