= Galsi Assembly constituency =

Galsi
- Constituency No. 274 for the West Bengal Legislative Assembly
- Interactive Map Outlining Galsi Assembly Constituency

Constituency details
- Country: India
- Region: East India
- State: West Bengal
- District: Purba Bardhaman
- Lok Sabha constituency: Bardhaman–Durgapur
- Established: 1951
- Total electors: 204,466
- Reservation: SC

Member of Legislative Assembly
- 18th West Bengal Legislative Assembly
- Incumbent Raju Patra
- Party: BJP
- Alliance: NDA
- Elected year: 2026

Galsi Assembly constituency is an assembly constituency in Purba Bardhaman district in the Indian state of West Bengal. It is reserved for scheduled castes.

== Overview ==
As per orders of the Delimitation Commission, No. 274 Galsi (SC) assembly constituency covers Galsi I community development block, Galsi and Kurkuba gram panchayats of Galsi II CD Block and Kanksa, Trilokchandrapur, Bankati and Bidbehar gram panchayats of Kanksa CD Block.

As per orders of Delimitation Commission it is part of No. 39 Bardhaman–Durgapur Lok Sabha constituency. Galsi assembly segment was earlier part of Durgapur Lok Sabha constituency.

== Members of the Legislative Assembly ==
Year	Name	Party	Ref
1951	Jadabendra Nath Panja	Indian National Congress	
1951	Mahitosh Saha	Indian National Congress	
1957	Phakir Chandra Roy	Independent	
1957	Pramatha Nath Dhibar	Marxist Forward Bloc	
1962	Kanai Lal Das	Indian National Congress	
1967	Phakir Chandra Roy	Independent	
1969	Phakir Chandra Roy	Independent	
1971	Anil Roy	Communist Party of India (Marxist)	
1972	Ashwini Roy	Communist Party of India	
1977	Debranjan Sen	All India Forward Bloc	
1982	Debranjan Sen	All India Forward Bloc	
1987	Debranjan Sen	All India Forward Bloc	
1991	Dilip Mazumdar	Communist Party of India (Marxist)	
1996	Idrish Mondal	All India Forward Bloc	
2001	Mehbub Mondal	All India Forward Bloc	
2006	Mehbub Mondal	All India Forward Bloc	
2011	Sunil Kumar Mondal	All India Forward Bloc	
2014^	Gaur Chandra Mondal	Trinamool Congress	
2016	Alok Kumar Majhi	Trinamool Congress	
2021	Nepal Ghorui	Trinamool Congress	
2026	Raju Patra	Bharatiya Janata Party	

- ^ denotes by-election

== Election results ==
=== 2026 ===
2026 West Bengal Legislative Assembly election: Galsi
Party	Candidate	Votes	%	±%
BJP	Raju Patra	110,640	47.62	▲7.07
AITC	Alok Kumar Majhi	100,146	43.1	▼6.11
CPI(M)	Manimala Das	13,526	5.82	
NOTA	None of the above	2,780	1.2	▲0.19
Majority		10,494	4.52	▼4.14
Turnout		232,345	95.17	▲8.46
BJP gain from AITC		Swing		

=== 2021 ===
2021 West Bengal Legislative Assembly election: Galsi
Party	Candidate	Votes	%	±%
AITC	Nepal Ghorui	109,504	49.21	▲2.77
BJP	Bikash Biswas	90,242	40.55	▲30.09
AIFB	Nandalal Pandit	17,020	7.65	▼33.54
BSP	Sandip Sarkar	3,518	1.58	
NOTA	None of the above	2,254	1.01	
Majority		19,262	8.66	
Turnout		222,538	86.71	
AITC hold		Swing		

=== 2016 ===
2016 West Bengal Legislative Assembly election: Galsi
Party	Candidate	Votes	%	±%
AITC	Alok Kumar Majhi	95,203	46.44	▲5.62
AIFB	Nandalal Pandit	84,432	41.19	▲4.81
BJP	Sundar Paswan	21,435	10.46	▼7.63
NOTA	None of the above	3,927	1.92	▲0.17
Majority		10,771	5.25	▲0.81
Turnout		2,04,997	86.55	▲0.61
AITC hold		Swing		

=== 2014 by-election ===
2014 West Bengal Legislative Assembly by-election: Galsi
Party	Candidate	Votes	%	±%
AITC	Gaur Chandra Mandal	77,799	40.82	▼3.81
AIFB	Nandalal Pandit	69,336	36.38	▼14.21
BJP	Sundar Paswan	34,479	18.09	▲13.31
INC	Swapan Malik	8,958	4.70	New entry
NOTA	None of the above	3,401	1.75	New entry
Majority		8,463	4.44	▼1.52
Turnout		1,94,043	85.94	▼3.07
AITC gain from AIFB		Swing		

=== 2011 ===
2011 West Bengal Legislative Assembly election: Galsi
Party	Candidate	Votes	%	±%
AIFB	Sunil Kumar Mondal	92,126	50.59	
AITC	Joydeb Saha	81,272	44.63	
BJP	Tapan Bagdi	8,714	4.78	
Majority		10,854	5.96	
Turnout		1,82,112	89.01	
AIFB hold		Swing		

=== 1977-2006 ===
In 2006 and 2001 assembly elections, Mehbub Mondal of Forward Bloc won the Galsi assembly seat defeating his nearest rivals Anil Kumar Saha of BJP and Ajijul Haque Mondal of Congress respectively. Contests in most years were multi cornered but only winners and runners are being mentioned. In 1996 and 1991, Idrish Mondal of Forward Block defeated Syed Imdad Ali and Champak (both of Congress) respectively. In 1987, 1982 and 1977, Deb Ranjan Sen of Forward Block defeated Ajit Bandopadhyay, Himanshu Baran Roy and Nirmalendu Koner (all of Congress) respectively.

=== 1952-1972 ===
Aswini Roy of CPI won the seat in 1972. Anil Roy of CPI(M) won it in 1971. Phakir Chandra Roy (Independent) won it in 1969 and 1967. Kanai Lal Das of Congress won it in 1962. In 1957 and 1952, Galsi was a constituency with two seats. In 1957, Phakir Chandra Roy (Independent) and Pramathanath Dhibar of Forward Bloc won the seats. In independent India's first election in 1951, Mahitosh Saha and Jadabendra Nath Panja, both of Congress, won the seats.
