= Bardhaman Sadar North subdivision =

- Subdivision
- Interactive map of Bardhaman Sadar North subdivision
- Coordinates: 23.25°N 87.85°E
- Country: India
- State: West Bengal
- District: Purba Bardhaman
- Headquarters: Bardhaman

Area
  - Total: 1,958.43 km^{2} (756.15 sq mi)

Population
  - Total: 1,586,623
  - Density: 810.150/km^{2} (2,098.28/sq mi)

Languages
  - Official: Bengali, English
- Time zone: UTC+5:30 (IST)
- ISO 3166 code: ISO 3166-2:IN
- Website: http://bardhaman.gov.in/

Bardhaman Sadar North subdivision is an administrative subdivision of the Purba Bardhaman district in the state of West Bengal, India.

== Overview ==
The uneven laterite territory found in the western part of Paschim Bardhaman district extends up to Ausgram and then the alluvial floodplains commence. Bardhaman Sadar North subdivision extends from the Kanksa Ketugram plain, which lies along the Ajay on the north to the Bardhaman Plain, the central plain area of the district, with the Damodar on the south and the east.

== Subdivisions ==
Purba Bardhaman district is divided into the following administrative subdivisions:

Subdivision	Headquarters	Area km^{2}	Population (2011)	Rural population % (2011)	Urban population % (2011)
Bardhaman Sadar North	Bardhaman	1,958.43	1,586,623	73.58	26.42
Bardhaman Sadar South	Memari	1,410.03	1,198,155	95.54	4.46
Katwa	Katwa	1,070.48	963,022	88.44	11.56
Kalna	Kalna	993.75	1,087,732	87.00	13.00
Purba Bardhaman district	Bardhaman	5,432.69	4,835,532	84.98	15.02

Note:Before bifurcation of the erstwhile Bardhaman district Galsi I was in Durgapur subdivision, but after bifurcation it is in Bardhman Sadar North subdivision.

== Administrative units ==
Cities and towns in the Bardhaman Sadar North subdivision of Purba Bardhaman district
M: municipal city/ town, CT: census town, R: rural/ urban centre, H: historical site, W: river project, C: craft centre
Owing to space constraints in the small map, the actual locations in a larger map may vary slightly

Bardhaman Sadar North subdivision has 7 police stations, 7 community development blocks, 7 panchayat samitis, 64 gram panchayats, 603 mouzas, 580 inhabited villages, 2 municipalities and 8 census towns. The two municipalities are at Bardhaman and Guskara. The census towns are: Goda, Bahir Sarbamangala, Mirzapur, Nari, Gangpur, Raipur, Sukdal and Bud Bud. The subdivision has its headquarters at Bardhaman.

== Demographics ==
As per the 2011 Census of India data Bardhaman Sadar North subdivision, after bifurcation of Bardhaman district in 2017, had a total population of 1,586,623. There were 808,443 (51%) males and 778,190 (49%) females. Population below 6 years was 161,621.

As per the 2011 census data the total number of literates in Bardhaman Sadar North subdivision, after bifurcation of Bardhaman district in 2017, was 1,076,352 (75.53% of the population over 6 years) out of which males numbered 592,465 (81.59% of the male population over 6 years) and females numbered 483,837 (69.24% of the female population over 6 years).

See also – List of West Bengal districts ranked by literacy rate

Religion in Bardhaman Sadar North subdivision
Hindu	77.17%
Muslim	21.76%
Christian	0.28%
Others	0.79%

In the 2011 census Hindus numbered 1,224,367 and formed 77.17% of the population in Bardhaman Sadar North subdivision. Muslims numbered 345,264 and formed 21.76% of the population. Christians numbered 4,444 and formed 0.28% of the population. Others numbered 12,548 and formed 0.79% of the population.

== Police stations ==
Police stations in Bardhaman Sadar North subdivision have the following features and jurisdiction:

Police station	Area covered km^{2}	Municipal town	CD Block
Burdwan	192.15	Bardhaman	Burdwan I, Burdwan II
Women PS Burdwan	192.15	Bardhaman	Burdwan I, Burdwan II
Aushgram	198.90	Guskara	Ausgram I (part), Ausgram II (part)
Bud Bud	139.7	-	Galsi I (part), Ausgram II (part)
Bhatar	163.44	-	Bhatar
Galsi	294.4	-	Galsi I (part), Galsi II

In the police set up Kanksa PS is under the Subdivisional Police Officer of Bardhaman Sadar North subdivision.

== Blocks ==
Community development blocks in Bardhaman Sadar North subdivision are:

CD Block	Headquarters	Area km^{2}	Population (2011)	SC %	ST %	Hindus %	Muslims %	Literacy rate %	Census Towns
Ausgram I	Guskara	222.34	119,363	35.74	13.05	76.11	23.48	69.39	-
Ausgram II	Amrargar	360.45	150,896	37.87	14.42	77.32	21.35	68.00	-
Bhatar	Bhatar	415.01	263,064	32.44	9.74	73.20	25.67	71.56	-
Galsi I	Bud Bud	257.37	187,588	35.74	4.08	71.60	27.75	72.87	3
Galsi II	Galsi	219.09	147,177	39.64	4.08	74.78	24.74	70.05	-
Burdwan I	Kamnara	250.41	215,930	30.11	5.62	70.81	28.38	76.07	4
Burdwan II	Barshul	189.57	152,939	38.79	11.93	87.41	10.96	74.12	1

== Gram panchayats ==
The subdivision contains 64 gram panchayats under 7 community development blocks:

- Ausgram–I block consists of seven gram panchayats, viz. Ausgram, Billagram, Dignagar–II, Ukta, Berenda, Dignagar–I and Guskara–II.
- Ausgram–II block consists of seven gram panchayats, viz. Amarpur, Eral, Ramnagar, Vedia, Debshala, Kota and Valki.
- Bhatar block consists of 14 gram panchayats, viz. Amarun–I, Banpash, Eruar, Sahebganj–I, Amarun–II, Barabeloon–I, Mahachanda, Sahebganj–II, Bolgona, Barabeloon–II, Mahata, Bamunara, Bhatar and Nityanandapur.
- Burdwan–I block consists of nine gram panchayats, viz. Baghar–I, Belkash, Rayan–I, Baghar–II, Kshetia, Rayan–II, Bandul–I, Kurmun–I, Saraitikar.
- Burdwan–II block consists of nine gram panchayats, viz. Baikunthapur–I, Barsul–I, Kurmun–II, Baikunthapur–II, Barsul–II, Nabastha–I, Bandul–II, Gobindapur and Nabastha–II.
- Galsi–I block consists of nine gram panchayats, viz. Budbud, Loapur Krishnarampur, Paraj, Uchchagram, Chaktentul, Potna–Pursa, Loa Ramgopalpur, Mankar and Serorai.
- Galsi–II block consists of nine gram panchayats, viz. Adra, Gohogram, Maszidpur, Bhunri, Khano, Sanko, Galsi, Kurkuba and Satinandi.

== Economy ==
=== Agriculture ===
In the erstwhile Bardhaman district agriculture was the pre-dominant economic activity and the main source of livelihood for the rural people. The soil and climate favours the production of food grains. Cash crops are also grown. Irrigation facilities had contributed in a major way towards higher agricultural productivity. Amongst the districts of West Bengal, Bardhaman district had maximum irrigated land under cultivation. Given below is an overview of the agricultural production (all data in tonnes) for Bardhaman Sadar North subdivision, other subdivisions and the Purba Bardhaman district, after bifurcation of the erstwhile Bardhaman district, with data for the year 2013–14.

CD Block/ Subdivision	Rice	Wheat	Jute	Pulses	Oil seeds	Potatoes	Sugarcane
Burdwan I	159,649	-	-	1	1,594	23,526	398
Burdwan II	61,668	-	-	21	168	54,888	-
Ausgram I	11,901	305	-	45	582	38,175	721
Ausgram II	69,852	538	-	22	167	6,640	-
Bhatar	252,997	52	-	8	1,661	2,780	1,081
Galsi I	34,982	13	-	6	57	15,754	0
Galsi II	100,577	-	-	5	592	22,833	-
Bardhaman Sadar North	688,626	908	-	108	3,059	105,182	1,802
Bardhaman Sadar South	441,645	1,758	33	1,375	14,619	883,457	1,192
Katwa	509,610	638	65,168	217	7,432	51,928	97,483
Kalna	257,149	3,461	179,375	164	11,425	159,659	565
Purba Bardhaman district	1,897,030	6,765	244,576	1,864	36,535	1,200,226	101,042

== Education ==
The table below offers a comprehensive picture of the education scenario in Purba Bardhaman district, after bifurcation of Bardhaman district in 2017, with data for the year 2013-14:

Subdivision	Primary School		Middle School		High School		Higher Secondary School		General College, Univ		Technical / Professional Instt		Non-formal Education	
Subdivision	Institution	Student	Institution	Student	Institution	Student	Institution	Student	Institution	Student	Institution	Student	Institution	Student
Bardhaman Sadar North	947	83,083	42	3,019	122	72,981	92	94,260	8	24,612	38	7,666	2,331	81,318
Bardhaman Sadar South	787	59,920	38	3,138	103	59,680	60	62,371	5	9,521	7	2,069	2,067	64,473
Katwa	601	52,239	21	1,637	74	45,704	42	44,645	3	7,965	8	1,190	1,412	64,979
Kalna	673	54,249	26	1,984	74	55,964	51	65,334	4	9,594	7	663	1,761	67,996
Purba Bardhaman district	3,008	249,491	127	9,778	373	234,329	245	266,610	20	51,692	60	11,588	7,571	277,766

Note: Primary schools include junior basic schools; middle schools, high schools and higher secondary schools include madrasahs; technical schools include junior technical schools, junior government polytechnics, industrial technical institutes, industrial training centres, nursing training institutes etc.; technical and professional colleges include engineering colleges, medical colleges, para-medical institutes, management colleges, teachers training and nursing training colleges, law colleges, art colleges, music colleges etc. Special and non-formal education centres include sishu siksha kendras, madhyamik siksha kendras, centres of Rabindra mukta vidyalaya, recognised Sanskrit tols, institutions for the blind and other handicapped persons, Anganwadi centres, reformatory schools etc.

The following institutions are located in Bardhaman Sadar North subdivision:

- University of Burdwan was established at Bardhaman in 1960.
- Burdwan Medical College was established at Bardhaman in 1969.
- University Institute of Technology, Burdwan University at Bardhaman was established in 1999
- College of Agriculture (Extended Campus of Bidhan Chandra Krishi Viswavidalaya) near Nari.
- Kanad Institute of Engineering and Management was established at Mankar in 2008. It is affiliated with Maulana Abul Kalam Azad University of Technology.
- Burdwan Institute of Management and Computer Science at Dewandighi, Mirzapur was established in 2001.
- Burdwan Raj College was established at Bardhaman in 1881.
- St. Xavier's College was established in Bardhaman in 2011.
- Vivekananda Mahavidyalaya was established at Bardhaman in 1964.
- Maharajadhiraj Uday Chand Women's College was established at Bardhaman in 1955.
- Gushkara Mahavidyalaya was established at Guskara in 1955.
- Galsi Mahavidyalaya was established at Galsi in 2007.
- Mankar College at Mankar was established in 1987, It is affiliated with Kazi Nazrul University.
- Dasarathi Hazra Memorial College was established at Bhatar in 2013.
- Dr. Bhupendra Nath Dutta Smriti Mahavidyalaya was established at Hatgobindapur in 1996.

== Healthcare ==
The table below (all data in numbers) presents an overview of the medical facilities available and patients treated in the hospitals, health centres and sub-centres in 2014 in Purba Bardhaman district, after bifurcation of the erstwhile Bardhaman district in 2017, with data for the year 2013–14.

Subdivision	Health & Family Welfare Deptt, WB				Other State Govt Deptts	Local bodies	Central Govt Deptts / PSUs	NGO / Private Nursing Homes	Total	Total Number of Beds	Total Number of Doctors	Indoor Patients	Outdoor Patients
Subdivision	Hospitals	Rural Hospitals	Block Primary Health Centres	Primary Health Centres	Other State Govt Deptts	Local bodies	Central Govt Deptts / PSUs	NGO / Private Nursing Homes	Total	Total Number of Beds	Total Number of Doctors	Indoor Patients	Outdoor Patients
Bardhaman Sadar North	1	2	5	23	2	-	1	69	103	2,915	554	156,726	2,525,789
Bardhaman Sadar South	-	1	5	21	-	-	-	12	39	374	41	209,640	1,619,459
Katwa	1	1	5	13	-	-	-	8	28	452	59	65,055	1,291,942
Kalna	1	1	4	17	-	-	-	20	43	619	45	49,640	1,186,491
Purba Bardhaman district	3	5	19	74	2	-	1	109	213	4,360	699	481,061	6,623,681

Medical facilities available in Bardhaman Sadar North subdivision are as follows:

Hospitals: (Name, location, beds)
Bardhaman Medical College & Hospital, Bardhaman, 1,105 beds
Bardhaman Jail Hospital, Bardhaman, 35 beds
Bardhaman Police Hospital, Bardhaman, 44 beds
Bardhaman Railway Hospital, Bardhaman, 5 beds
Indian Red Cross Society, Bardhaman, 60 beds
Lions Club, Bardhaman, 15 beds
Rural Hospitals: (Name, CD block, location, beds)
Bononabagram Rural Hospital, Ausgram I CD block, Bononabagram, 30 beds
Mankar Rural Hospital, Galsi I CD block, Mankar, 30 beds
Pursha Rural Hospital, Galsi I CD block, Pursha, 30 beds
Bhatar Rural Hospital, Bhatar CD block, Bhatar, 60 beds
Block Primary Health Centres: (Name, block, location, beds)
Kurmun BPHC, Burdwan I CD block, Kurmun, 10 beds
Barshul BPHC, Burdwan II CD block, Barshul, 10 beds
Jamtara BPHC, Ausgram II CD block, Jamtara, PO Amragar, 15 beds
Adrahati BPHC, Galsi II CD block, Adrahati, 15 beds
Primary Health Centres: (CD block-wise)(CD block, PHC location, beds)
Burdwan I CD block: Baghat (4), Jamar, PO Korar (10)
Burdwan II CD block: Bamchandipur, PO Jateram (2), Kashiara PO Hatgobindapur (4)
Bhatar CD block: Balgona (2), Bijipur, PO Basuda (6), Bonpass (10), Erruar, PO Aruarar (10), Nasigram (6), Sahebganj (4)
Ausgram I CD block: Guskara (10 beds), Ukta, PO Pitchkuri Dhal (4), Dignagar (6)
Ausgram II CD block: at Amarpur PO Aduria (6), Bahadurpur, PO Abhirampur (4), Bhatkunda (4), Bhedia (10) and Ramnagar (6)
Galsi I CD block: Bharatpur (6), Lowa, PO Dwarmari (10)
Galsi II CD block: Bhuri (10), Satinadi, PO Khana Junction (10)

== Electoral constituencies ==
Lok Sabha (parliamentary) and Vidhan Sabha (state assembly) constituencies in Bardhaman Sadar North subdivision were as follows:

Lok Sabha constituency	Reservation	Vidhan Sabha constituency	Reservation	CD Block and/or Gram panchayats and/or municipal areas
Bardhaman-Durgapur	None	Bardhaman Dakshin	None	Bardhaman municipality
		Bardhaman Uttar	Reserved for SC	Burdwan II CD Block and Belkash, Bandul I, Rayan I, Rayan II, Saraitikar, Baghar I and Baghar II gram panchayats of Burdwan I CD Block
		Bhatar	None	Bhatar CD Block and Kurman I and Kshetia gram panchayats of Burdwan I CD Block
		Galsi	Reserved for SC	Galsi I CD Block, Galsi and Kurkuba gram panchayats of Galsi II CD Block and Kanksa, Trilokchandrapur, Bankati and Bidbehar gram panchayats of Kanksa CD Block in Durgapur subdivision
		All other Vidhan Sabha segments outside Bardhaman Sadar North subdivision		
Bishnupur	Reserved for SC	Khandaghosh	Reserved for SC	Khandaghosh CD Block in Bardhaman Sadar North subdivision and Adra, Bhuri, Gohogram, Khano, Maszidpur, Sanko and Satinadi gram panchayats of Galsi II CD Block
		All other Vidhan Sabha segments outside Bardhaman Sadar North subdivision		
