= Mirzapur, Bardhaman =

Mirzapur
- Census Town
- Location in West Bengal, India Mirzapur (India)
- Coordinates: 23.283436°N 87.881667°E
- Country: India
- State: West Bengal
- District: Purba Bardhaman

Area
  - Total: 11.62 km^{2} (4.49 sq mi)

Population (2011)
  - Total: 7,733
  - Density: 665.5/km^{2} (1,724/sq mi)

Languages
  - Official: Bengali, English
- Time zone: UTC+5:30 (IST)
- PIN: 713102
- Telephone code: 0342
- Vehicle registration: WB
- Lok Sabha constituency: Bardhaman-Durgapur
- Vidhan Sabha constituency: Bardhaman Uttar
- Website: purbabardhaman.gov.in

Mirzapur is a census town in Burdwan I CD Block in Bardhaman Sadar North subdivision of Purba Bardhaman district in the state of West Bengal, India.

== Geography ==
Cities and towns in the Bardhaman Sadar North subdivision of Purba Bardhaman district
M: municipal city/ town, CT: census town, R: rural/ urban centre, H: historical site, W: river project, C: craft centre
Owing to space constraints in the small map, the actual locations in a larger map may vary slightly

=== Location ===
Mirzapur is not shown in Google maps. It is shown in the map of Burdwan I CD block in the District Census Handbook.

=== Urbanisation ===
73.58% of the population of Bardhaman Sadar North subdivision lives in the rural areas. Only 26.42% of the population lives in the urban areas, and that is the highest proportion of urban population amongst the four subdivisions in Purba Bardhaman district. The map alongside presents some of the notable locations in the subdivision. All places marked in the map are linked in the larger full screen map.

=== Police station ===
There is a police station at Dewandighi.

== Demographics ==
As per the 2011 Census of India Mirzapur had a total population of 7,733, of which 3,915 (51%) were males and 3,818 (50%) were females. Population below 6 years was 870. The total number of literates in Mirzapur was 5,120 (74.60% of the population over 6 years).

== Infrastructure ==
As per the District Census Handbook 2011, Mirzapur covered an area of 11.6221 km^{2}. It had 6 km roads. Amongst the medical facilities, the nearest nursing home was 5 km away and the nearest veterinary hospital was 5 km away. It had 7 medicine shops. It had 2 primary schools and 1 secondary school. Major educational facilities were available 5 km away at Bardhaman. Social, cultural and recreational facilities were available 5–8 km away at Bardhaman.

== Transport ==
State Highway 7 running from Rajgram (in Birbhum district) to Midnapore (in Paschim Medinipur district) and State Highway 8 running from Santaldih (in Purulia district) to Majhdia (in Nadia district) meet at Mirzapur and have a common route till Bankura Morh, near Chak Purohit.

There is a station at Kamnara on the Bardhaman–Katwa line, with EMU trains, around 2–3 km away. Barddhaman Junction, a major railway station which is a part of the Kolkata Suburban Railway system and has direct trains to Delhi and Mumbai, and with links all over the country, is about 5 km away.

== Education ==
Burdwan Institute of Management and Computer Science at Dewandighi was established in 2001. Affiliated with the University of Burdwan it offers courses in BBA, BCA, B Sc Biotechnology and B Sc Biochemistry.

Burdwan Model School at Dewandighi, Mirzapur, was founded in 2003. It follows the CBSE syllabus and is growing in stages. It has modern facilities.

Vidyasagar Uchha Vidyalaya, a coeducational institution, is affiliated with the West Bengal Board of Secondary Education. It is also affiliated with West Bengal Council of Higher Secondary Education.
