= Galsi =

Galsi may refer to:

- Galsi, Bardhaman, a village in Purba Bardhaman district, West Bengal, India.
- Galsi I, an administrative division in Bardhaman Sadar North subdivision of Purba Bardhaman district in the Indian state of West Bengal
- Galsi II, an administrative division in Bardhaman Sadar North subdivision of Purba Bardhaman district in the Indian state of West Bengal
- Galsi Mahavidyalaya, a general degree college in Galsi, Purba Bardhaman district
- Galsi (Vidhan Sabha constituency), an electoral constituency in Purba Bardhaman district in the Indian state of West Bengal
- GALSI, a planned Algeria-Sardinia-Italy natural gas pipe line
