= Amlajorah =

- Village
- Location in West Bengal, India Amlajorah (India)
- Coordinates: 23.4771°N 87.3928°E
- Country: India
- State: West Bengal
- District: Paschim Bardhaman

Languages
  - Official: Bengali, English
- Time zone: UTC+5:30 (IST)
- PIN: 713212 (Rajbandh)
- Telephone/STD code: 0343
- Lok Sabha constituency: Bardhaman-Durgapur
- Website: bardhaman.gov.in

Amlajorah is one of the oldest village in Kanksa CD Block in Durgapur subdivision of Paschim Bardhaman district in the state of West Bengal, India.

== Geography ==
It is about 8 km from Durgapur.

== Transport ==
Rajbandh (part of Howrah-Delhi main line) is the nearest railway station, which is approximately 2 km away from Amlajorah. It is also well connected by bus from Durgapur and Panagarh.

NH 19 (old numbering NH 2)/ Grand Trunk Road passes approximately 2.5 km away from the village.

Kazi Nazrul Islam Airport at Andal is the nearest domestic airport. It commenced operations in May 2015 and is roughly 30 kilometres (19 mi) from Amlajorah.

== Police station ==
P.S is Kanksa which has jurisdiction over Kanksa CD Block. The area covered is 280 km^{2}.

== Education ==
Amlajorah has one Higher secondary and one primary school.

Nearest engineering college is Durgapur Institute of Advanced Technology and Management.

Gouri Devi Institute of Medical Sciences is a medical college with 300-bedded multi-speciality health care venture, located approximately 2.5 km from Amlajorah.
