= Goda, Purba Bardhaman =

Goda
- Census Town
- Location in West Bengal, India Goda (India)
- Coordinates: 23.2591°N 87.8386°E
- Country: India
- State: West Bengal
- District: Purba Bardhaman

Area
  - Total: 4.55 km^{2} (1.76 sq mi)

Population (2011)
  - Total: 6,483
  - Density: 1,420/km^{2} (3,690/sq mi)

Languages
  - Official: Bengali, English
- Time zone: UTC+5:30 (IST)
- Vehicle registration: WB
- Lok Sabha constituency: Bardhaman-Durgapur
- Vidhan Sabha constituency: Bardhaman Uttar
- Website: purbabardhaman.gov.in

Goda is a census town in Burdwan I CD Block in Bardhaman Sadar North subdivision of Purba Bardhaman district in the Indian state of West Bengal.

== Geography ==
Cities and towns in the Bardhaman Sadar North subdivision of Purba Bardhaman district
M: municipal city/ town, CT: census town, R: rural/ urban centre, H: historical site, W: river project, C: craft centre
Owing to space constraints in the small map, the actual locations in a larger map may vary slightly

=== Location ===
Goda is located at 23.2591°N 87.8386°E.

=== Urbanisation ===
73.58% of the population of Bardhaman Sadar North subdivision lives in the rural areas. Only 26.42% of the population lives in the urban areas, and that is the highest proportion of urban population amongst the four subdivisions in Purba Bardhaman district. The map alongside presents some of the notable locations in the subdivision. All places marked in the map are linked in the larger full screen map.

== Demographics ==
As per the 2011 Census of India, Goda had a total population of 6,483 of which 3,294 (51%) were males and 3,189 (49%) were females. Population below 6 years was 633. The total number of literates in Goda was 4,936 (84.38% of the population over 6 years).

== Infrastructure ==
As per the District Census Handbook 2011, Goda covered an area of 4.548 km^{2}. Amongst the medical facilities, the nearest nursing home was 4 km away and the nearest veterinary hospital was 5 km away. It had 5 medicine shops. Amongst the educational facilities it had was 2 primary schools, 1 middle school, 1 secondary school and 1 senior secondary school. The nearest degree college was at Bardhaman 2 km away. Social, cultural and recreational facilities were available 2–3 km away at Bardhaman.

== Transport ==
National Highway 19 (old numbering NH 2) / Grand Trunk Road passes through Goda. National Highway 114 links to NH 19 at Goda.

== Culture ==
108 Shiva temples at Nawab Hat is located nearby.
