= Bahir Sarbamangala =

- Census Town
- Location in West Bengal, India Bahir Sarbamangala (India)
- Coordinates: 23.2683°N 87.8726°E
- Country: India
- State: West Bengal
- District: Purba Bardhaman

Area
  - Total: 3.26 km^{2} (1.26 sq mi)

Population (2011)
  - Total: 12,819
  - Density: 3,930/km^{2} (10,200/sq mi)

Languages
  - Official: Bengali, English
- Time zone: UTC+5:30 (IST)
- Vehicle registration: WB
- Lok Sabha constituency: Bardhaman-Durgapur
- Vidhan Sabha constituency: Bardhaman Uttar
- Website: purbabardhaman.gov.in

Bahir Sarbamangala is a census town in Burdwan I CD Block in Bardhaman Sadar North subdivision of Purba Bardhaman district in the Indian state of West Bengal.

== Geography ==
Cities and towns in the Bardhaman Sadar North subdivision of Purba Bardhaman district
M: municipal city/ town, CT: census town, R: rural/ urban centre, H: historical site, W: river project, C: craft centre
Owing to space constraints in the small map, the actual locations in a larger map may vary slightly

=== Location ===
Bahir Sarbamangala is located at 23.2683°N 87.8726°E.

Bahir Sarbamangala is not shown in Google maps. It is shown in the map of Burdwan I CD block in the District Census Handbook. It is adjacent to Bardhaman municipal area.

=== Urbanisation ===
73.58% of the population of Bardhaman Sadar North subdivision lives in the rural areas. Only 26.42% of the population lives in the urban areas, and that is the highest proportion of urban population amongst the four subdivisions in Purba Bardhaman district. The map alongside presents some of the notable locations in the subdivision. All places marked in the map are linked in the larger full screen map.

== Demographics ==
As per the 2011 Census of India, Bahir Sarbamangala had a total population of 12,819 of which 6,527 (51%) were males and 6,292 (49%) were females. Population below 6 years was 1,405. The total number of literates in Bahir Sarbamangala was 8,996 (74.82% of the population over 6 years).

== Infrastructure ==
As per the District Census Handbook 2011, Bahir Sarbamangala covered an area of 3.2557 km^{2}. It had 5 km roads. Amongst the medical facilities, the nearest nursing home was 5 km away and the nearest veterinary hospital was 5 km away. It had 4 medicine shops. Major educational facilities were available 1–2 km away at Bardhaman. Social, cultural and recreational facilities were available 2–5 km away at Bardhaman.

== Transport ==
State Highway 7 passes through Bahir Sarbamangala.
