= State Highway 14 (West Bengal) =

Road in West Bengal, India

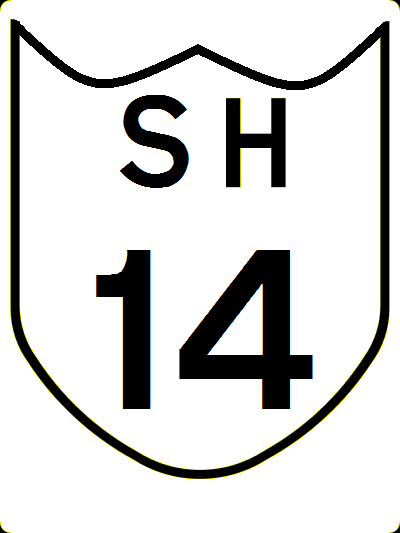
State Highway 14

Route information
- Length: 226 km (140 mi)

Major junctions
- From: Junction with NH 14 at Dubrajpur
- Bamunara-Joydeb Road at Joydeb Morh; Bolpur-Kabi Joydeb Road at Ilambazar; Ilambazar-Ausgram-Guskhara Road at Radhamohanpur; NH 19 from Panagarh to Bud Bud; Ilamabazar-Ausgram-Guskhara Road at Guskhara; NH 114 at Guskhara; SH7 at Muratipur; Bardhaman-Katwa Road at Balgona; Dainhat Road at Balgona; SH 6 from Jajigram to High Road Morh; SH 15 at High Road Morh; NH 12 from Debagram to Palashi
- To: Junction with SH 11 at Betai

Location
- Country: India
- State: West Bengal
- Districts: Birbhum, Bardhaman, Nadia

Highway system
- Roads in India; Expressways; National; State; Asian; State Highways in West Bengal

State Highway 14 (West Bengal) is a state highway in West Bengal, India.

== Route ==
SH 14 originates from junction with NH 14 at Dubrajpur and passes through Ilambazar, Debipur, Kanksa, Panagarh, Mankar, Amrargar, Jamtara, Dwariapur, Guskara, Balgona, Katwa, Natungram, (there is no bridge across the Hooghly), Debagram, Palashi and terminates at the junction with SH 11 at Betai (in Nadia district).

The Dubrajpur-Panagarh sector is part of Panagarh-Morgram Highway.

The total length of SH 14 is 226 km.

West Bengal Traffic Police shows the route as terminating at Betai in Nadia district, the Public Works Department shows it as terminating at Katwa in Bardhaman district.

== Road sections ==
It is divided into different sections as follows:

Road Section	District	CD Block	Length (km)
Dubrajpur-Ilambazar-Panagarh	Birbhum	Dubrajpur, Ilambazar	70
Ilambazar-Bolpur-Santiniketan (branch route)	Birbhum	Bolpur-Sriniketan	28
Panagarh-Mankar (via NH 19)	Paschim Bardhaman	Kanksa	49
Mankar-Guskara-Balgona	Purba Bardhaman	Ausgram I, Ausgram II, Bhatar Galsi I, Galsi II	50
Balgona-Katwa-Hooghly River Ghat	Purba Bardhaman	Mongalkote, Katwa I	30
Hooghly River Ghat-Debagram	Nadia	Kaliganj	18
Debagram-Palashi (via NH 12)	Nadia	-	-
Palashi-Betai	Nadia	Tehatta II, Tehatta I	30

== See also ==
- List of state highways in West Bengal
