= Bud Bud =

- Census Town
- Location in West Bengal, India Bud Bud (India)
- Coordinates: 23.408319°N 87.54273°E
- Country: India
- State: West Bengal
- District: Purba Bardhaman

Area
  - Total: 3.96 km^{2} (1.53 sq mi)

Population (2011)
  - Total: 4,558
  - Density: 1,150/km^{2} (2,980/sq mi)

Languages
  - Official: Bengali
- Time zone: UTC+5:30 (IST)
- Telephone code: 0343
- Vehicle registration: WB
- Lok Sabha constituency: Bardhaman-Durgapur
- Vidhan Sabha constituency: Galsi
- Website: purbabardhaman.gov.in

Bud Bud is a census town in Galsi I CD Block of Bardhaman Sadar North subdivision of Purba Bardhaman district in the Indian state of West Bengal.

== Geography ==
Cities and towns in the Bardhaman Sadar North subdivision of Purba Bardhaman district
M: municipal city/ town, CT: census town, R: rural/ urban centre, H: historical site, W: river project, C: craft centre
Owing to space constraints in the small map, the actual locations in a larger map may vary slightly

=== Location ===
Bud Bud is located at 23°24′30″N 87°32′34″E.

Bud Bud is located on NH 19 (formerly known as Grand Trunk Road) in the laterite plains between Damodar River and Ajay River. Khari or Khargeswari River flows through the area. It is believed that the river was earlier linked with Damodar.

It is nearly 30 kilometres (19 mi) from Durgapur Steel City and 36 kilometres (22 mi) from Burdwan town. It is close to Mankar railway station and a place surrounded with rice processing mills.

=== Urbanisation ===
73.58% of the population of Bardhaman Sadar North subdivision live in the rural areas. Only 26.42% of the population live in the urban areas, and that is the highest proportion of urban population amongst the four subdivisions in Purba Bardhaman district. The map alongside presents some of the notable locations in the subdivision. All places marked in the map are linked in the larger full screen map.

=== Gram panchayats ===
Gram panchayats under Galsi I Panchayat Samiti (in Bardhaman Sadar North subdivision) are: Chaktentul, Budbud, Mankar, Lowapur-Krishnarampur, Serorai and Uchagram.

=== Police station ===
Bud Bud police station has jurisdiction over parts of Galsi I and Ausgram II CD Blocks. The area covered is 139.7 km^{2}.

=== CD Block HQ ===
The headquarters of Galsi I CD Block are located at Bud Bud.

== Demographics ==
As per the 2011 Census of India, Bud Bud had a total population of 4,558 of which 2,334 (51%) were males and 2,224 (49%) were females. Population below 6 years was 410. The total number of literates in Bud Bud was 3,348 (80.71% of the population over 6 years).

== Infrastructure ==
As per the District Census Handbook 2011, Bud Bud covered an area of 3.9631 km^{2}. It had 15 km roads. Amongst the medical facilities, the nearest nursing home was 3 km away and the nearest veterinary hospital was 3 km away. It had 4 medicine shops. Amongst the educational facilities it had were 3 primary schools, 2 middle schools, 2 secondary schools and 2 senior secondary schools. The nearest degree college was at Mankar 6 km away.

== Transport ==
It is located on Grand Trunk Road, and is near Mankar railway station on the Bardhaman-Durgapur stretch of the Howrah-Delhi track. The office of the Block Development Officer of Galsi I block covering areas of Galsi and Bud Bud police stations is located at Bud Bud.

SH 14, running from Dubrajpur (in Birbhum district) to Betai (in Nadia district), passes through Bud Bud.

== Culture ==
Shridhara Temple, temple of goddess Durga, is well known in the area.

== Health ==
.

== See also ==
- List of reduplicated place names
- Budbud -its history and culture
