= Nari, Purba Bardhaman =

Nari
- Census Town
- Location in West Bengal, India Nari (India)
- Coordinates: 23.2474°N 87.8916°E
- Country: India
- State: West Bengal
- District: Purba Bardhaman

Area
  - Total: 4.83 km^{2} (1.86 sq mi)

Population (2011)
  - Total: 13,072
  - Density: 2,710/km^{2} (7,010/sq mi)

Languages
  - Official: Bengali, English
- Time zone: UTC+5:30 (IST)
- Vehicle registration: WB
- Lok Sabha constituency: Bardhaman-Durgapur
- Vidhan Sabha constituency: Bardhaman Uttar
- Website: purbabardhaman.gov.in

Nari is a census town in Burdwan I CD Block in Bardhaman Sadar North subdivision of Purba Bardhaman district in the Indian state of West Bengal.

== Geography ==
Cities and towns in the Bardhaman Sadar North subdivision of Purba Bardhaman district
M: municipal city/ town, CT: census town, R: rural/ urban centre, H: historical site, W: river project, C: craft centre
Owing to space constraints in the small map, the actual locations in a larger map may vary slightly

=== Location ===
Nari is located at 23.2474°N 87.8916°E.

Nari is also shown in the map of Burdwan I CD block in the District Census Handbook.

=== Urbanisation ===
73.58% of the population of Bardhaman Sadar North subdivision lives in the rural areas. Only 26.42% of the population lives in the urban areas, and that is the highest proportion of urban population amongst the four subdivisions in Purba Bardhaman district. The map alongside presents some of the notable locations in the subdivision. All places marked in the map are linked in the larger full screen map.

== Demographics ==
As per the 2011 Census of India, Nari had a total population of 13,072 of which 6,634 (51%) were males and 6,438 (49%) were females. Population below 6 years was 1,080. The total number of literates in Nari was 10,404 (86.76% of the population over 6 years).

== Infrastructure ==
As per the District Census Handbook 2011, Nari covered an area of 4.8256 km^{2}. Amongst the medical facilities, the nearest nursing home was 2 km away and the nearest veterinary hospital was 6 km away. It had 2 primary schools, 1 middle school, 1 secondary school and 1 senior secondary school. Major educational facilities were available 5 km away at Bardhaman. Nari had a reading room. Social, cultural and recreational facilities were available 5–8 km away at Bardhaman.

== Transport ==
Nari is off Kalna Road.

== Education ==
The Extended Campus of Bidhan Chandra Krishi Viswavidyalaya and agricultural farm is located nearby.

Santanu Ghosh Memorial High School is located at Nari.
