= Jamtara, Bardhaman =

Jamtara
- Village
- Location in West Bengal, India Jamtara (India)
- Coordinates: 23.435319°N 87.60273°E
- Country: India
- State: West Bengal
- District: Purba Bardhaman

Population (2011)
  - Total: 1,688

Languages
  - Official: Bengali, English
- Time zone: UTC+5:30 (IST)
- Lok Sabha constituency: Bolpur
- Vidhan Sabha constituency: Ausgram
- Website: purbabardhaman.gov.in

Jamtara is a village located in the Ausgram II CD Block in Bardhaman Sadar North subdivision of the Purba Bardhaman district, in West Bengal, India.

== Geography ==
Cities and towns in the Bardhaman Sadar North subdivision of Purba Bardhaman district
M: municipal city/ town, CT: census town, R: rural/ urban centre, H: historical site, W: river project, C: craft centre
Owing to space constraints in the small map, the actual locations in a larger map may vary slightly

=== Location ===
Jamtara is located at 23.435319°N 87.60273°E.

=== Urbanisation ===
73.58% of the population of Bardhaman Sadar North subdivision live in the rural areas. Only 26.42% of the population live in the urban areas, and that is the highest proportion of urban population amongst the four subdivisions in Purba Bardhaman district. The map alongside presents some of the notable locations in the subdivision. All places marked in the map are linked in the larger full screen map.

== Demographics ==
As per the 2011 Census of India, Jamtara had a total population of 3,283 of which 1,688 (51%) were males and 1,595 (49%) were females. Population below 6 years was 357. The total number of literates in Jamtara was 1,988 (67.94% of the population over 6 years).

== Transport ==
State Highway 14 (West Bengal) running from Budbud to Gushkara passes through Jamtara.

== Healthcare ==
Jamtara block primary health centre at Jamtara, PO Amragar (with 15 beds) is the main medical facility in Ausgram II CD block. There are primary health centres at Amarpur PO Aduria (with 6 beds), Bahadurpur, PO Abhirampur (with 4 beds), Bhatkunda (with 4 beds), Bhedia (with 10 beds) and Ramnagar (with 6 beds). In 2012, the average monthly patients attending Jamtara BPHC were 5,390 and average monthly admissions were 146. It handled 1,401 annual emergency admissions.
