= Adrahati =

Adrahati Adra
- Village
- Location in West Bengal, India Adrahati (India)
- Coordinates: 23.2942°N 87.6465°E
- Country: India
- State: West Bengal
- District: Purba Bardhaman

Population (2011)
  - Total: 3,774

Languages
  - Official: Bengali, English
- Time zone: UTC+5:30 (IST)
- Lok Sabha constituency: Bishnupur
- Vidhan Sabha constituency: Khandaghosh
- Website: purbabardhaman.gov.in

Adrahati is a village in Galsi II CD Block in Bardhaman Sadar North subdivision of Purba Bardhaman district in the Indian state of West Bengal.

== Geography ==
Cities and towns in the Bardhaman Sadar North subdivision of Purba Bardhaman district
M: municipal city/ town, CT: census town, R: rural/ urban centre, H: historical site, W: river project, C: craft centre
Owing to space constraints in the small map, the actual locations in a larger map may vary slightly

=== Location ===
Adrahati is located at 23.2942°N 87.6465°E.

=== Urbanisation ===
73.58% of the population of Bardhaman Sadar North subdivision live in the rural areas. Only 26.42% of the population live in the urban areas, and that is the highest proportion of urban population amongst the four subdivisions in Purba Bardhaman district. The map alongside presents some of the notable locations in the subdivision. All places marked in the map are linked in the larger full screen map.

== Demographics ==
As per the 2011 Census of India, Adra had a total population of 3,774 of which 1,872 (50%) were males and 1,902 (50%) were females. Population below 6 years was 376. The total number of literates in Adra was 2,018 (59.39% of the population over 6 years).

== Transport ==
Adrahati-Galsi Road links it to National Highway 19 (old numbering NH 2)/ Grand Trunk Road.

== Education ==
Adrahati Banwarilal Sadharan Sikhsaniketan is a co-educational high school affiliated with the West Board of Secondary Education. It is also affiliated with West Bengal Council of Higher Secondary Education for higher secondary classes.

== Healthcare ==
Adrahati block primary health centre at Adrahati (with 15 beds) is the main medical facility in Galsi II CD block. There are primary health centres at: Bhuri (with 10 beds) and Satinadi, PO Khana Junction (with 10 beds). In 2012, the average monthly patients attending Adrahati BPHC were 6,675 and average monthly admissions were 156. It handled 1,841 annual emergency admissions.

See also - Healthcare in West Bengal
