= Bankati, Paschim Bardhaman =

Bankati
- Village
- Location in West Bengal, India Bankati (India)
- Coordinates: 23.6001°N 87.4886°E
- Country: India
- State: West Bengal
- District: Paschim Bardhaman

Population (2011)
  - Total: 1,255

Languages*
  - Official: Bengali, English
- Time zone: UTC+5:30 (IST)
- PIN: 713212
- Telephone code: 91 341
- Lok Sabha constituency: Bardhaman-Durgapur
- Vidhan Sabha constituency: Durgapur Purba
- Website: pascimbardhaman.co.in

Bankati is a village in Kanksa CD block in the Durgapur subdivision of the Paschim Bardhaman district in the Indian state of West Bengal.

== Geography ==
Cities and towns in the southern and eastern portions of Durgapur subdivision in Paschim Bardhaman district
MC: Municipal Corporation, CT: census town, R: rural centre, A: airport, B: barrage, H: historical site
Owing to space constraints in the small map, the actual locations in a larger map may vary slightly

=== Urbanisation ===
According to the 2011 census, 79.22% of the population of the Durgapur subdivision was urban and 20.78% was rural. The Durgapur subdivision has 1 municipal corporation at Durgapur and 38 (+1 partly) census towns (partly presented in the map alongside; all places marked on the map are linked in the full-screen map).

=== Location ===
Bankati is located at 23.6001°N 87.4886°E.

== Demographics ==
According to the 2011 Census of India, Bankati had a toal population of 1,255 of which 650 (52%) were males and 605 (48%) were females. Population in the age range 0–6 years was 125. The total number of literate persons in Bankati was 880 (71.50% of the population over 6 years).

*For language details see Kanksa (community development block)#Language and religion

== Education ==
Eklabya Model School (residential) is a Hindi-medium coeducational institution established in 2002. It has facilities forteaching from class VI to class XII. The school has a library with 81 books and a playground.

Ajodhya High School is a Bengali-medium coeducational school established in 1957. It has facilities for teaching from class V to class XII.

== Culture ==
There is a 15-foot-high bell metal (pital) chariot at Bankati, built in the 19th century. Designed in the style of a pancharatna temple it has carvings on its body. Bankati has two Shiva temples - Gopeswar Shiva Temple built in 1155 and Pancha Ratna Shiva temple built in 1782.

David J. McCutchion mentions a Shiva Temple at Bankati built in 1832. It is described as a standard type pancharatna temple with bridged rekha turrets and single entrance and terracotta decoration.

== Gallery ==
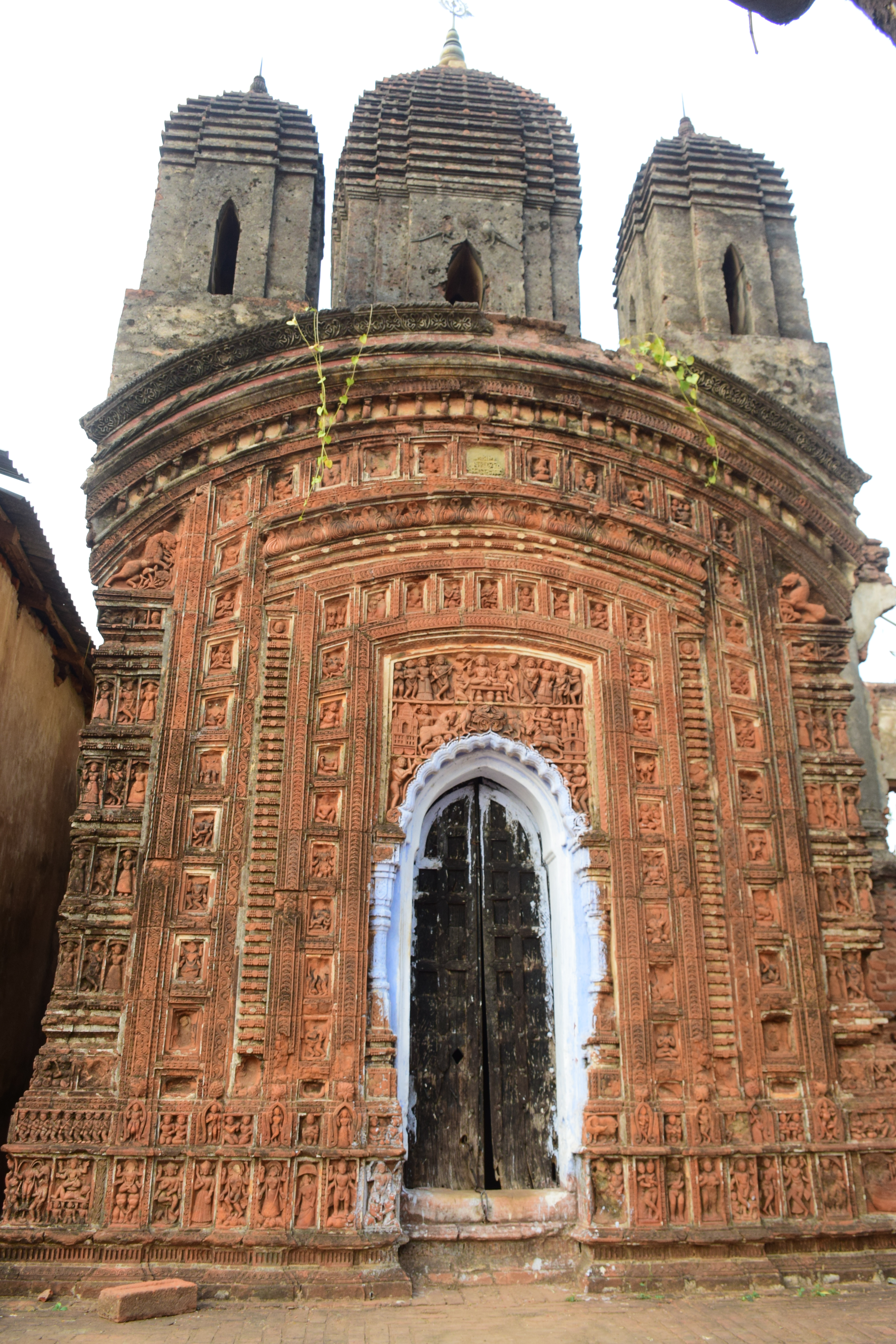
Gopaleswar (possibly Gopeswar) Shiva Temple at Bankati

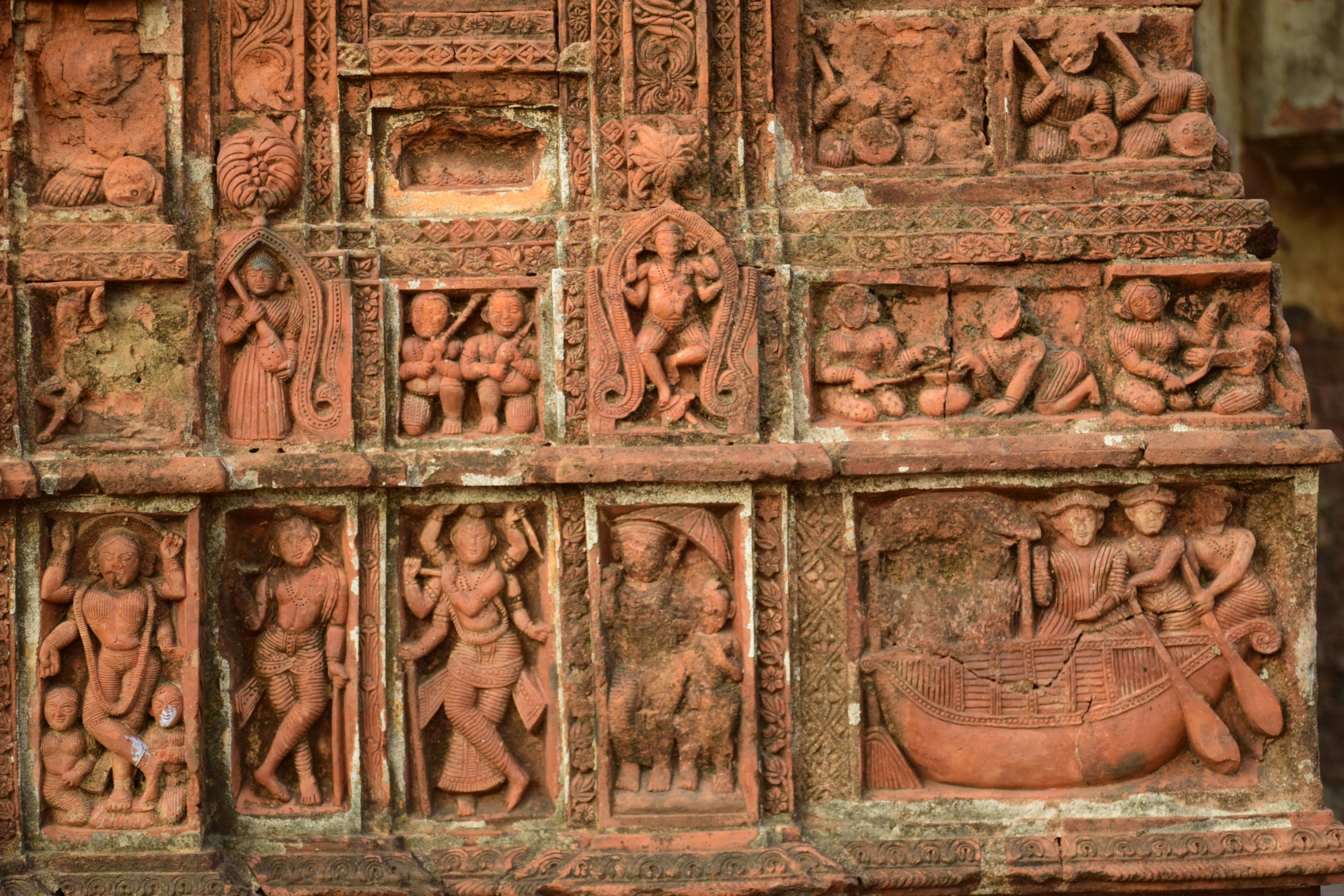
Terracota panels in Gopaleswar Shiva Temple at Bankati

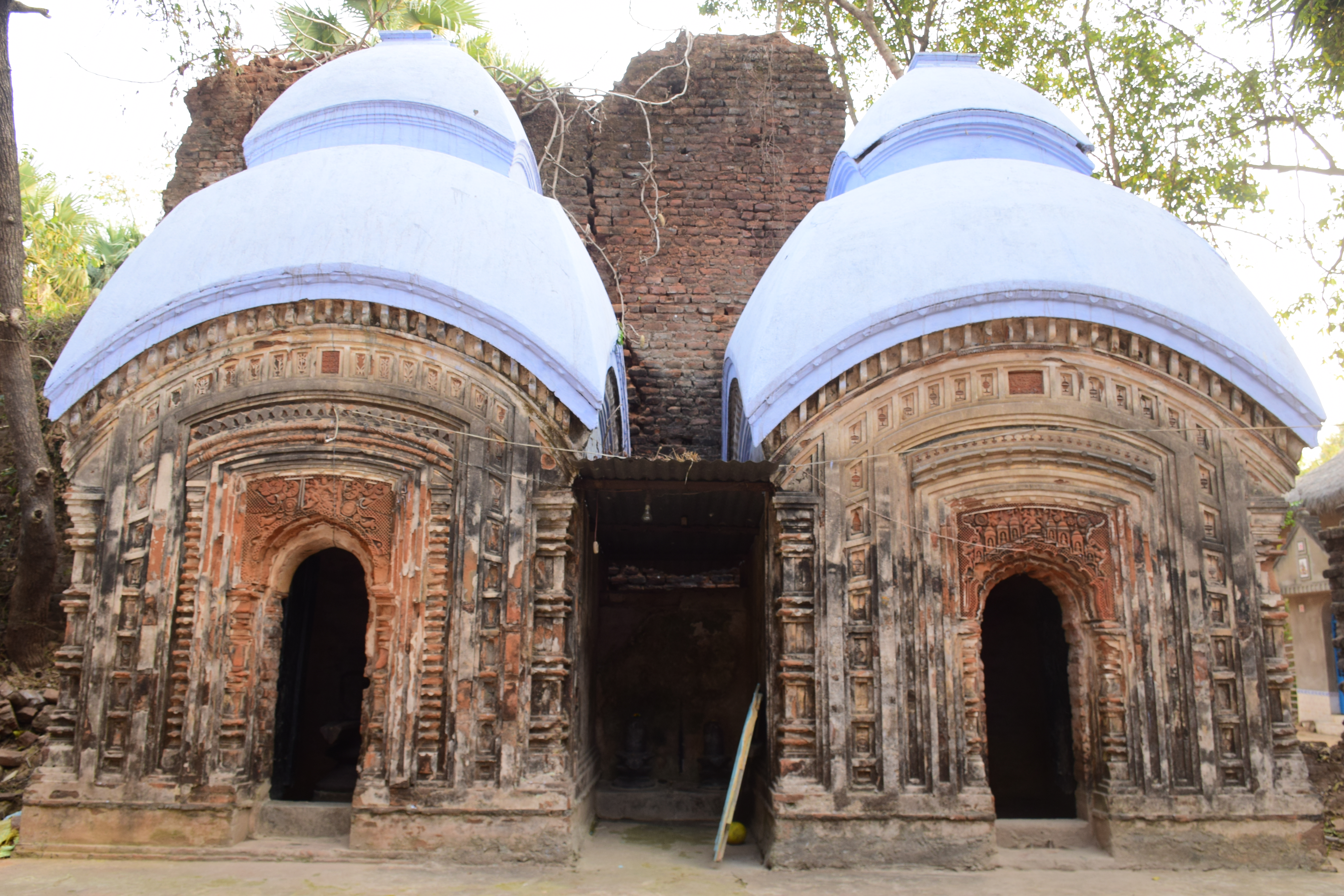
Atchala temples at Kalitala, Bankati

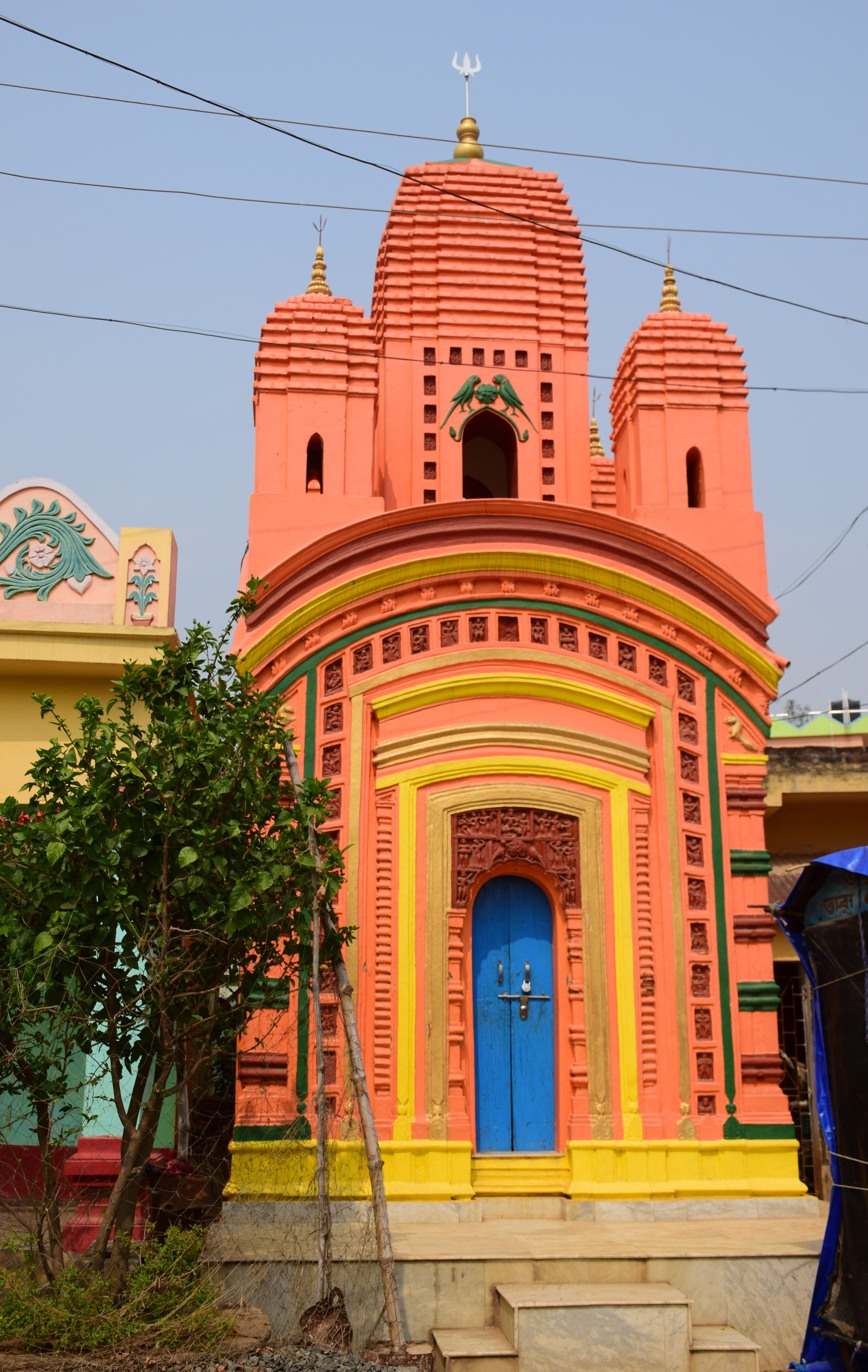
Shiva Temple at Hattala, Bankati

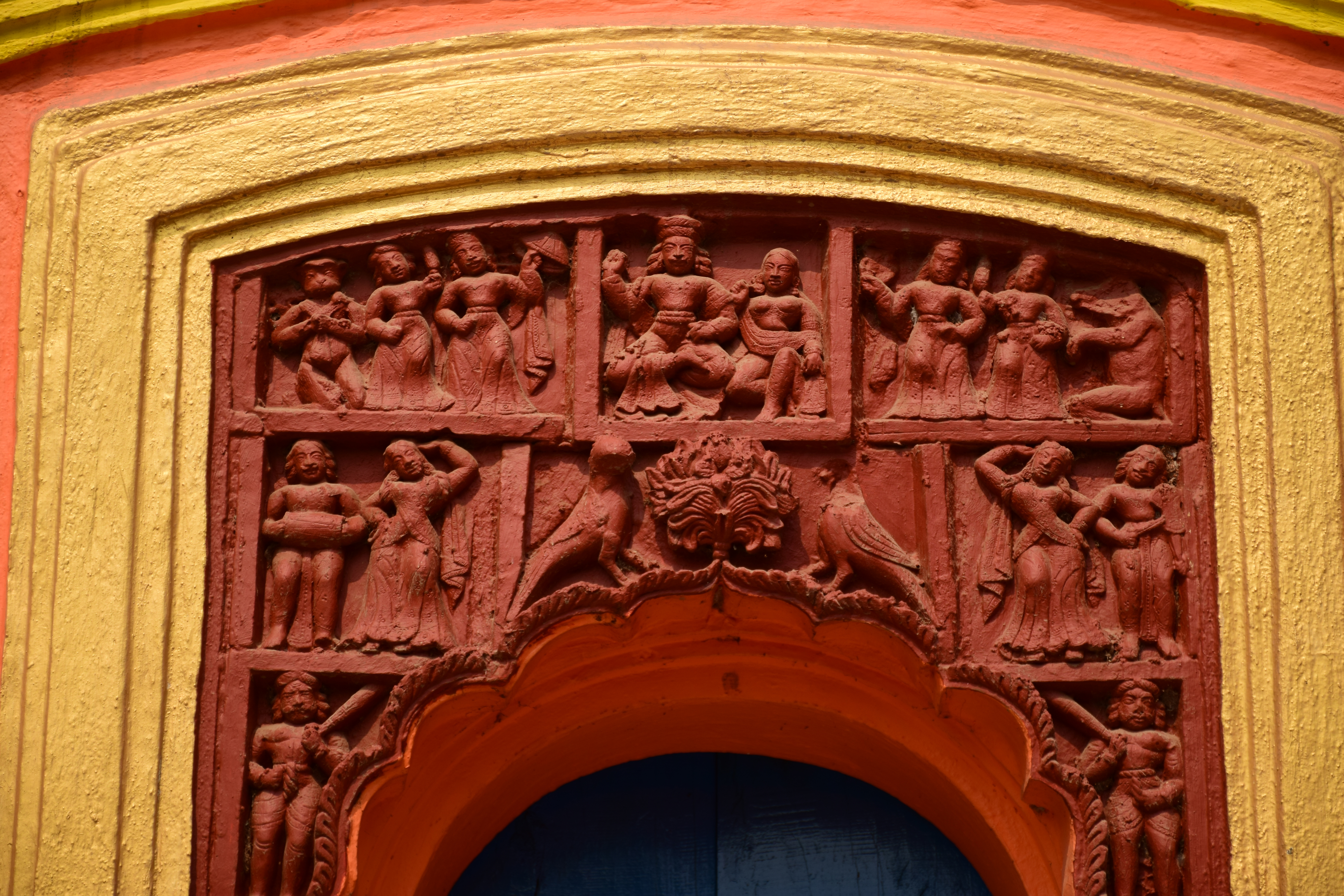
Terracota panels in the Shiva Temple at Hattala, Bankati
