= Syed Shahedullah =

West Bengal politician

Sayed Sahedullah

Member of West Bengal Legislative Assembly
- In office 1967–1969
- Prime Minister: Prafulla Chandra Sen
- Preceded by: Constituency established
- Succeeded by: Debabrata Datta
- Constituency: Bardhaman Uttar

Agriculture Minister of Bengal

Personal details
- Born: 24 March 1913 Bardhaman district, Bengal Presidency
- Died: January 24, 1991 (aged 77) Calcutta, West Bengal
- Party: Communist Party of India (Marxist)

Syed Shahedullah (24 March 1913 – 24 January 1991), also known by his daak naam Mutter, was a Communist politician and writer. He was the inaugural secretary of party's Bengal and Burwan district branches, and the inaugural MLA of Bardhaman Uttar Assembly constituency in the West Bengal Legislative Assembly.

== Early life and family ==
Shahedullah was born on 24 March 1913 to a Bengali family of Muslim Syeds in the city of Burdwan, Bengal Presidency. He was the son of Syed Hamidullah and Musammat Habiba Bibi. His maternal grandfather Maulvi Abul Kashem was once a very close colleague of Suren Banerjee. He was a pioneer of the anti-partition movement and even one of the top leaders of undivided Bangladesh. Another maternal grandfather of Shahedullah, Maulvi Abul Hayat, was a leader of the Khilafat Movement.

== Career ==
In 1931, he worked as a volunteer at the Burdwan District Congress Conference. Later, he became a believer in communism. In 1935, the first district committee of the Communist Party of India (Marxist) in undivided Bangladesh was formed in Burdwan. He was elected as the first secretary of this committee and served in this position for three years. Along with the work of forming the party, he also organized the farmers' movement in the district. He was associated with the farmers' movement for more than fifty years. In 1939, he was one of the leaders of the historic canal tax resistance movement in Burdwan district. In 1948, he served as the secretary of the provincial farmers' meeting. In the same year, when the party was declared illegal, he went into hiding. In 1963-64, he was imprisoned during the Sino-Indian conflict. He became a member of the State Council of the Undivided Communist Party and a member of the CPI (M) State Committee in 1968. From then until 1988, he was a member of the State Committee of the party. He was elected to the Bengal Legislative Council in 1957, to the Burdwan Municipality in 1964, to the West Bengal Legislative Assembly from Bardhaman Uttar Assembly constituency in 1967, and to the Rajya Sabha in 1978. He was famous as an essayist. In 1937, the magazine 'Comrade' was published on his initiative. For a long time, he was the editor of the magazine 'Nandan'. His books include 'Gandhism in the Eyes of Leninists', 'Education and Class Relations', 'Matribhasha and Literature', 'Various Topics' etc.
