= Kurmun =

- Village
- Location in West Bengal, India Kurmun (India)
- Coordinates: 23.3375°N 87.9798°E
- Country: India
- State: West Bengal
- District: Purba Bardhaman

Population (2011)
  - Total: 8,478

Languages
  - Official: Bengali, English
- Time zone: UTC+5:30 (IST)
- PIN: 713102
- Telephone/STD code: 0342
- Lok Sabha constituency: Bardhaman-Durgapur
- Vidhan Sabha constituency: Bhatar
- Website: purbabardhaman.gov.in

Kurmun (also spelled Kurhmun, Kurman) is a village in Burdwan I CD block in Bardhaman Sadar North subdivision of Purba Bardhaman district in the state of West Bengal, India.

== Geography ==
Cities and towns in the Bardhaman Sadar North subdivision of Purba Bardhaman district
M: municipal city/ town, CT: census town, R: rural/ urban centre, H: historical site, W: river project, C: craft centre
Owing to space constraints in the small map, the actual locations in a larger map may vary slightly

=== Location ===
Kurmun is located at 23.3375°N 87.9798°E.

=== Urbanisation ===
73.58% of the population of Bardhaman Sadar North subdivision live in the rural areas. Only 26.42% of the population live in the urban areas, and that is the highest proportion of urban population amongst the four subdivisions in Purba Bardhaman district. The map alongside presents some of the notable locations in the subdivision.

== Demographics ==
As per the 2011 Census of India Kurmun had a total population of 8,478, of which 4,256 (50%) were males and 4,256 (50%) were females. Population below 6 years was 796. The total number of literates in Kurmun was 5,512 (71.75% of the population over 6 years).

== Transport ==
State Highway 8 running from Santaldih (in Purulia district) to Majhdia (in Nadia district) passes through Kurmun

== Education ==
Kurmun High school is a coeducational Bengali-medium higher secondary school. Established in 1914, it has facilities for teaching from class V to XII. It is housed in a government building, it has 16 computers, a library with 6,000 books and a play ground.

Kurmun also has a library named "Udayan Sangha Rural Library" with around 10000 books and some ancient books called 'Punthi'

== Culture ==
Kurmun has two old temples, the Ishaneswar Shiva temple with a lingam in the shape of a trishula and Kalachand Dharmaraj temple in Buri Gachtala. Earlier, Kurmun used to celebrate two Gajan utsabs – Ishaneswar Gajan in the Bengali month of Choitro and Kalachand Gajan during Buddha Purnima. Now there is a combined Gajan festival in Choitro, celebrated by all castes in the village. In the earlier days there used to be a dance with a nara mundo (severed human head), that was collected from a dead body and painted in bright colours, this tradition still continues. In the Ishaneswar Shiva temple there is an old stone idol of Saptamatrika Indrani. It is a rather unusual combination of Shiva and Shakti worship.

In Kurmun, there is one Church at Arachiya More, where Christmas is celebrated by Christians.

In Palashi (also called Sonapalashi), an adjacent village, there is a Buro Shiva temple, constructed in 1872. It has an attractive terracotta façade. Lal Behari Dey, of Bengal Peasant Life (earlier named Govinda Samanta) fame was born at Palashi.

== Healthcare ==
Kurmun block primary health centre at Kurmun (with 10 beds) is the main medical facility in Burdwan I CD block. There are primary health centres at Baghat (with 4 beds) and Jamar, PO Korar (with 10 beds). In 2012, the average monthly patients attending Kurmun BPHC were 4,880 and average monthly admissions were 112. It handled 799 annual emergency admissions.

See also - Healthcare in West Bengal
