= Kamnara =

- Village
- Location in West Bengal, India Kamnara (India)
- Coordinates: 23°18′33.5″N 87°52′14.5″E
- Country: India
- State: West Bengal
- District: Purba Bardhaman
  - Rank: 2,196

Languages
  - Official: Bengali, English
- Time zone: UTC+5:30 (IST)
- Telephone/STD code: 0342
- Lok Sabha constituency: Bardhaman-Durgapur
- Vidhan Sabha constituency: Bardhaman Uttar
- Website: purbabardhaman.gov.in

Kamnara is a village in Burdwan I CD block in Bardhaman Sadar North subdivision of Purba Bardhaman district in the state of West Bengal, India.

== Geography ==
Cities and towns in the Bardhaman Sadar North subdivision of Purba Bardhaman district
M: municipal city/ town, CT: census town, R: rural/ urban centre, H: historical site, W: river project, C: craft centre
Owing to space constraints in the small map, the actual locations in a larger map may vary slightly

=== CD block HQ ===
The headquarters of Burdwan I CD block are located at Kamnara.

=== Urbanisation ===
73.58% of the population of Bardhaman Sadar North subdivision live in the rural areas. Only 26.42% of the population live in the urban areas, and that is the highest proportion of urban population amongst the four subdivisions in Purba Bardhaman district. The map alongside presents some of the notable locations in the subdivision. All places marked in the map are linked in the larger full screen map.

== Demographics ==
As per the 2011 Census of India Kamnara had a total population of 2,196, of which 1,158 (53%) were males and 1,038 (47%) were females. Population below 6 years was 226. The total number of literates in Kamnara was 1,522 (77.26% of the population over 6 years).

== Transport ==
The State Highway 7, running from Rajgram (in Murshidabad district) to Midnapore (in Paschim Medinipur district) passes through Kamnara.

Kamnara railway station is situated at Kamnara on the Bardhaman–Katwa line, with EMU trains. Barddhaman Junction railway station is 6 km away.

== Education ==
Burdwan APC Roy Private Industrial Training Institute was established near Kamnara Pirtala BDO Office in 2012.
