= Sibpur, Paschim Bardhaman =

Sibpur
- Village
- Location in West Bengal, India Sibpur (India)
- Coordinates: 23.6287°N 87.4078°E
- Country: India
- State: West Bengal
- District: Paschim Bardhaman

Population (2011)
  - Total: 1,953

Languages*
  - Official: Bengali, English
- Time zone: UTC+5:30 (IST)
- PIN: 713212
- Telephone code: 91 341
- Lok Sabha constituency: Asansol
- Vidhan Sabha constituency: Pandabeswar
- Website: pascimbardhaman.co.in

Sibpur (also spelled Shibpur) is a village in Faridpur Durgapur CD block in the Durgapur subdivision of the Paschim Bardhaman district in the Indian state of West Bengal.

== Geography ==
Cities and towns in the southern and eastern portions of Durgapur subdivision in Paschim Bardhaman district
MC: Municipal Corporation, CT: census town, R: rural centre, A: airport, B: barrage, H: historical site
Owing to space constraints in the small map, the actual locations in a larger map may vary slightly

=== Urbanisation ===
According to the 2011 census, 79.22% of the population of the Durgapur subdivision was urban and 20.78% was rural. The Durgapur subdivision has 1 municipal corporation at Durgapur and 38 (+1 partly) census towns (partly presented in the map alongside; All places marked on the map are linked in the full-screen map).

=== Location ===
Sibpur is located at 23.6287°N 87.4078°E.

== Demographics ==
According to the 2011 Census of India, Sibpur had a total population of 1953 of which 999 (51%) were males and 954 (49%) were females. Population in the age range 0–6 years was 109. The total number of literate persons in Sibpur was 1,844 (71.26% of the population over 6 years).

*For language details see Kanksa (community development block)#Language and religion

== Transport ==
A new bridge is proposed to be built across the Ajay River near Sibpur, connecting this area to Jaydev Kenduli. At present a fair-weather bridge is laid across the river in the dry season.

== Education ==
Shibpur Junior High School is a Bengali-medium coeducational institution established in 2010. It has facilities for teaching from class V to class VIII.

Jamdaha High School is a Bengali-medium coeducational institution established in 1982. It has facilities for teaching from class V to class XII. The school has a library with 307books and a playground.

== Healthcare ==
There is a primary health centre, with 6 beds, at Shibpur.
