= Debipur, India =

Debipur
- Census Town
- Location in West Bengal, India Debipur (India)
- Coordinates: 23°27′22.7″N 87°27′14.0″E
- Country: India
- State: West Bengal
- District: Paschim Bardhaman

Area
  - Total: 0.87 km^{2} (0.34 sq mi)
- Elevation: 19 m (62 ft)

Population (2011)
  - Total: 9,967
  - Density: 11,000/km^{2} (30,000/sq mi)

Languages
  - Official: Bengali, English
- Time zone: UTC+5:30 (IST)
- PIN: 713148
- Telephone/ STD code: 0341
- Vehicle registration: WB
- Website: paschimbardhaman.co.in

Debipur is a census town in the Kanksa CD block of the Durgapur subdivision in the Paschim Bardhaman district in the state of West Bengal, India.

== Geography ==
Cities and towns in the southern and eastern portions of Durgapur subdivision in Paschim Bardhaman district
MC: Municipal Corporation, CT: census town, R: rural centre, A: airport, B: barrage, H: historical site
Owing to space constraints in the small map, the actual locations in a larger map may vary slightly

=== Location ===
The Asansol-Durgapur region is composed of undulating laterite soil. This area lies parallel between the Damodar River and the Ajay River. The influx of refugees from East Pakistan and their rehabilitation in the area, and irrigation facilities extended by Damodar Valley Corporation led to destruction of much of the forests in the area, but some areas are still dense.

=== Urbanisation ===
According to the 2011 census, 79.22% of the population of the Durgapur subdivision was urban and 20.78% was rural. The sole municipal corporation in the Durgapur subdivision is located at Durgapur and the subdivision has 38 (+1 partly) census towns (partly presented in the map alongside; all places marked on the map are linked in the full-screen map).

== Demographics ==
According to the 2011 Census of India, Debipur had a total population of 9,967, of which 5,064 (51%) were males and 4,903 (49%) were females. Population in the age range 0–6 years was 1,084. The total number of literate persons in Debipur was 7,402 (83.33% of the population over 6 years).

As of 2001 India census, Debipur had a population of 9115. Males constitute 52% of the population and females 48%. Debipur has an average literacy rate of 68%, higher than the national average of 59.5%: male literacy is 75% and, female literacy is 60%. In Debipur, 12% of the population is under 6 years of age.

== Infrastructure ==
According to the District Census Handbook 2011, Bardhaman, Debipur covered an area of 0.87 km^{2}. Among the civic amenities, it had 17 km roads, with both open and covered drains, the protected water-supply involved tap water from treated source, hand pump. It had 489 domestic electric connections. Among the medical facilities it had 1 charitable hospital/ nursing home, 2 medicine shops. Among the educational facilities it had were 9 primary schools, 2 middle schools, 2 secondary schools, 2 senior secondary schools. Among the social, recreational, cultural facilities it had 1 auditorium/ community hall. It had the branch offices of 1 nationalised bank and 1 agricultural credit society.

== Transport ==
State Highway 14 passes through Debipur.

== Healthcare ==
Panagarh Rural Hospital, with 30 beds, at Panagarh, is the major government medical facility in the Kanksa CD block.
