= Nisith Kumar Malik =

Indian politician

Member of the West Bengal Legislative Assembly
- Incumbent
- Assumed office 2 May 2021
- Preceded by: Aparna Saha
- Constituency: Bardhaman Uttar
- In office 2016–2021

Personal details
- Party: AITC (until 2026); Democratic Trinamool Congress (from 2026)
- Profession: Politician

Nisith Kumar Malik, is an Indian politician member of Democratic Trinamool Congress. He is an MLA, elected from the Bardhaman Uttar constituency in the 2016 West Bengal Legislative Assembly election. In 2021 assembly election he was re-elected from the same constituency.
