= Burdwan I =

- Community development block
- Location in West Bengal
- Coordinates: 23°19′06″N 87°49′54″E
- Country: India
- State: West Bengal
- District: Purba Bardhaman
- Parliamentary constituency: Bardhaman-Durgapur
- Assembly constituency: Bardhaman Uttar, Bhatar

Area
  - Total: 96.68 sq mi (250.41 km^{2})
- Elevation: 121 ft (37 m)

Population (2011)
  - Total: 215,943
  - Density: 2,233.5/sq mi (862.36/km^{2})
- Time zone: UTC+5.30 (IST)
- PIN: 713104 (Rajbati); 713141 (Talit/ Baghar)
- Telephone/STD code: 0342
- Vehicle registration: WB-37,WB-38,WB-41,WB-42,WB-44
- Literacy Rate: 76.07 per cent
- Website: http://purbabardhaman.gov.in/

Burdwan I is a community development block that forms an administrative division in Bardhaman Sadar North subdivision of Purba Bardhaman district in the Indian state of West Bengal.

== Geography ==
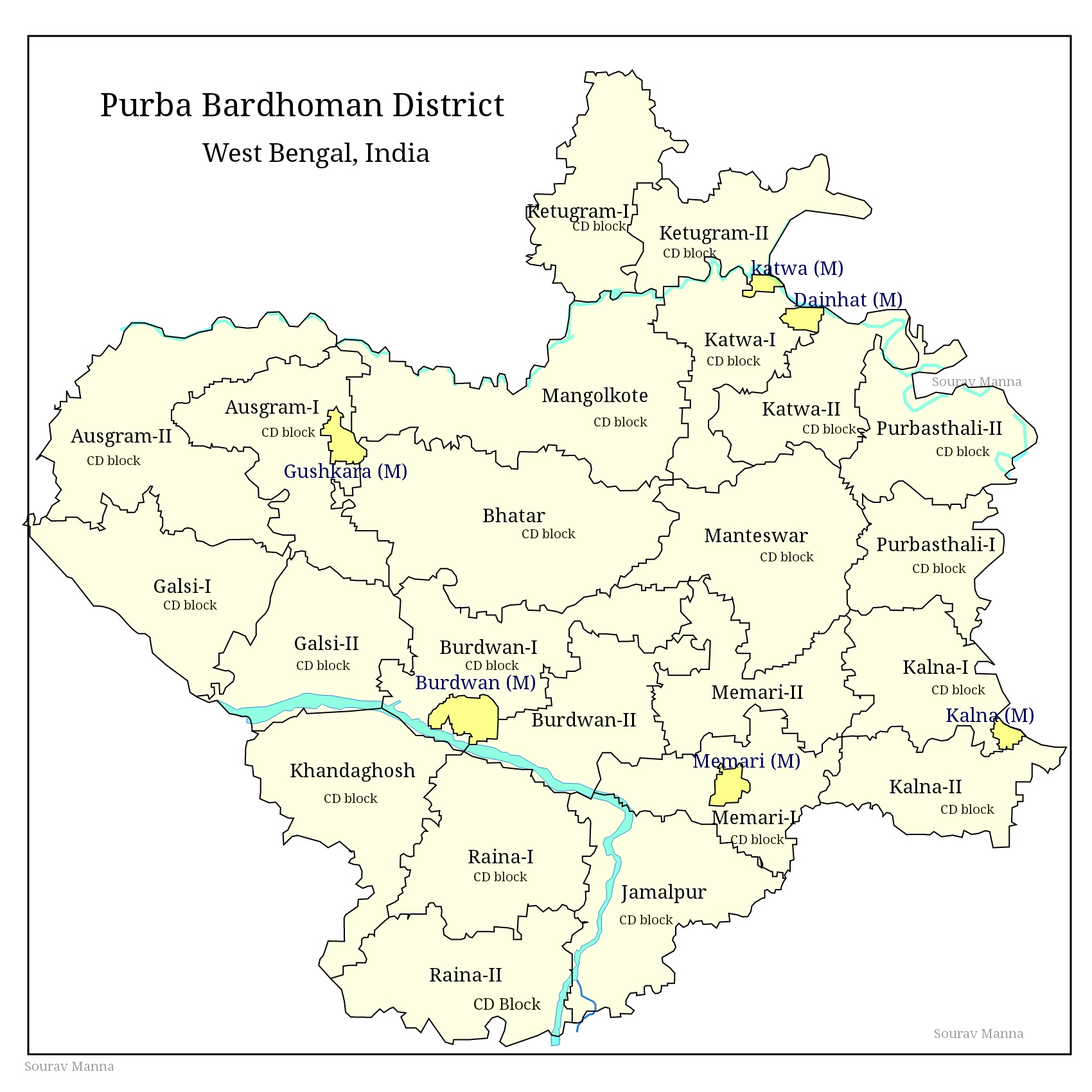
CD blocks of Purba Bardhaman district

=== Location ===
Baghar, a constituent panchayat of Burdwan I block, is located at 23°19′06″N 87°49′54″E.

Burdwan I CD Block is part of the Bardhaman Plain, the central plain area of the district. The area is surrounded by the Bhagirathi on the east, the Ajay on the north-west and the Damodar on the west and south. Old river channels and small creeks found in the region dry up in the dry season, but the Bardhaman Plains are sometimes subject to heavy floods during the rainy season. The region has recent alluvial soils.

Burdwan I CD Block is bounded by Bhatar and Manteswar CD Blocks on the north, Memari II and Burdwan II CD Blocks on the east, Khandaghosh CD Block on the south and Galsi II CD Block on the west.

Burdwan I CD Block has an area of 250.41 km^{2}. It has 1 panchayat samity, 9 gram panchayats, 162 gram sansads (village councils), 80 mouzas and 75 inhabited villages. Burdwan police station and Women police station Burdwan serve this block. Headquarters of this CD Block is at Kamnara.

Gram panchayats of Burdwan I block/panchayat samiti are: Baghar I, Baghar II, Belkash, Bondul I, Kshetia, Kurmun I, Rayan I, Rayan II and Saraitikar.

== Demographics ==
=== Population ===
As per the 2011 Census of India Burdwan I CD Block had a total population of 215,943, of which 175,836 were rural and 40,107 were urban. There were 109,841 (51%) males and 106,102 (49%) females. Population below 6 years was 23,365. Scheduled Castes numbered 65,028 (30.11%) and Scheduled Tribes numbered 12,127 (5.62%).

As per 2001 census, Burdwan I block had a total population of 179,774, out of which 92,276 were males and 87,498 were females. Burdwan I block registered a population growth of 23.93 per cent during the 1991-2001 decade. Decadal growth for Bardhaman district was 14.36 per cent. Decadal growth in West Bengal was 17.84 per cent. Scheduled castes at 61,087 formed around one-third the population. Scheduled tribes numbered 12,309.

Census Towns in Burdwan I CD Block are (2011 census figures in brackets): Goda (P) (6,483), Bahir Sarbamangala (P) (12,819), Mirzapur (7,733) and Nari (P) (13,072).

Large villages (with 4,000+ population) in Burdwan I CD Block are (2011 census figures in brackets): Jagadabad (4,006), Talit (5,240), Krishnapur (6,279), Simdali (5,501), Kharjuli (4,198), Rayan (18,973), Sadhanpur (P) (8181) and Kurmun (8,478).

Other villages in Burdwan I CD Block include (2011census figures in brackets): Bandul (1,823), Saraitikar (3,383), Belkash (1,244), Baghar (3,395) and Khetia (2,421).

=== Literacy ===
As per the 2011 census, the total number of literates in Burdwan I CD Block was 146,493 (76.07% of the population over 6 years) out of which males numbered 80,604 (82.21% of the male population over 6 years) and females numbered 65,889 (69.70% of the female population over 6 years). The gender disparity (the difference between female and male literacy rates) was 12.51%.

As per 2001 census, Burdwan I block had a total literacy of 68.83 per cent for the 6+ age group. While male literacy was 77.68 per cent female literacy was 59.42 per cent. Bardhaman district had a total literacy of 70.18 per cent, male literacy being 78.63 per cent and female literacy being 60.95 per cent.

See also – List of West Bengal districts ranked by literacy rate

Literacy in CD blocks of
Bardhaman district
Bardhaman Sadar North subdivision
Ausgram I – 69.39%
Ausgram II – 68.00%
Bhatar – 71.56%
Burdwan I – 76.07%
Burdwan II – 74.12%
Galsi II – 70.05%
Bardhaman Sadar South subdivision
Khandaghosh – 77.28%
Raina I – 80.20%
Raina II – 81.48%
Jamalpur – 74.08%
Memari I – 74.10%
Memari II – 74.59%
Kalna subdivision
Kalna I – 75.81%
Kalna II – 76.25%
Manteswar – 73.08%
Purbasthali I – 77.59%
Purbasthali II – 70.35%
Katwa subdivision
Katwa I – 70.36%
Katwa II – 69.16%
Ketugram I – 68.00%
Ketugram II – 65.96%
Mongalkote – 67.97%
Durgapur subdivision
Andal – 77.25%
Faridpur Durgapur – 74.14%
Galsi I – 72.81%
Kanksa – 76.34%
Pandabeswar – 73.01%
Asansol subdivision
Barabani – 69.58%
Jamuria – 69.42%
Raniganj – 73.86%
Salanpur – 78.76%
2011 Census: CD Block Wise

Primary Census Abstract Data

=== Languages and religion ===
Religion in Burdwan I CD block (2011)
Hinduism	70.81%
Islam	28.38%
Other or not stated	0.81%

In the 2011 census Hindus numbered 152,908 and formed 70.81% of the population in Burdwan I CD Block. Muslims numbered 61,823 and formed 28.38% of the population. Christians numbered 750 and formed 0.35% of the population. Others numbered 1,002 and formed 0.46% of the population.

In Bardhaman district the percentage of Hindu population has been declining from 84.3% in 1961 to 77.9% in 2011 and the percentage of Muslim population has increased from 15.2% in 1961 to 20.7% in 2011.

Languages of Burdwan I CD block (2011)
1. Bengali (92.2%)
2. Santali (4.53%)
3. Hindi (2.91%)
4. Others (0.41%)

At the time of the 2011 census, 92.15% of the population spoke Bengali, 4.53% Santali and 2.91% Hindi as their first language.

== Rural poverty ==
As per poverty estimates obtained from a household survey for families living below poverty line in 2005, rural poverty in Burdwan I CD Block was 33.70%.

== Economy ==
=== Livelihood ===
In Burdwan I CD Block in 2011, amongst the class of total workers, cultivators formed 12.91%, agricultural labourers 39.56%, household industry workers 3.66% and other workers 43.86%.

Burdwan I CD Block is part of the area where agriculture dominates the scenario but the secondary and tertiary sectors have shown an increasing trend.

=== Infrastructure ===
There are 75 inhabited villages in Burdwan I CD block. All 75 villages (100%) have power supply. 74 villages (98.67%) have drinking water supply. 18 villages (24.00%) have post offices. 73 villages (97.33%) have telephones (including landlines, public call offices and mobile phones). 46 villages (61.33%) have a pucca (paved) approach road and 60 villages (80.00%) have transport communication (includes bus service, rail facility and navigable waterways). 30 villages (40.00%) have agricultural credit societies. 8 villages (10.67%) have banks.

In 2013-14, there were 105 fertilizer depots, 15 seed stores and 55 fair price shops in the CD Block.

=== Agriculture ===
Persons engaged in agriculture
in Burdwan I CD Block
1. Bargadars (5.32%)
2. Patta holders (9.20%)
3. Small farmers (6.23%)
4. Marginal farmers (23.2%)
5. Agricultural labourers (56.0%)

Although the Bargadari Act of 1950 recognized the rights of bargadars to a higher share of crops from the land that they tilled, it was not implemented fully. Large tracts, beyond the prescribed limit of land ceiling, remained with the rich landlords. From 1977 onwards major land reforms took place in West Bengal. Land in excess of land ceiling was acquired and distributed amongst the peasants. Following land reforms land ownership pattern has undergone transformation. In 2013-14, persons engaged in agriculture in Burdwan I CD Block could be classified as follows: bargadars 5.32%, patta (document) holders 9.20%, small farmers (possessing land between 1 and 2 hectares) 6.23%, marginal farmers (possessing land up to 1 hectare) 23.25% and agricultural labourers 55.99%.

In 2003-04 net cropped area in Burdwan, I CD Block was 18,147 hectares and the area in which more than one crop was grown was 18,102 hectares.

In 2013-14, Burdwan I CD Block produced 126,390 tonnes of Aman paddy, the main winter crop, from 37,577 hectares, 30,259 tonnes of Boro paddy (spring crop) from 8,040 hectares, 23,526 tonnes of potatoes from 958 hectares and 398 tonnes of sugarcane from 5 hectares. It also produced pulses and oilseeds.

In Bardhaman district as a whole Aman paddy constituted 64.32% of the total area under paddy cultivation, while the area under Boro and Aus paddy constituted 32.87% and 2.81% respectively. The expansion of Boro paddy cultivation, with higher yield rates, was the result of expansion of irrigation system and intensive cropping. In 2013-14, the total area irrigated in Burdwan I CD Block was 26,510.86 hectares, out of which 26,092.21 hectares were irrigated by canal water, 161.30 hectares by river lift irrigation and 257.35 hectares by deep tube wells.

=== Banking ===
In 2013-14, Burdwan I CD Block had offices of 12 commercial banks and 2 gramin banks.

== Transport ==
Burdwan I CD Block has 9 originating/ terminating bus routes.

The Bardhaman-Asansol section, which is a part of Howrah-Gaya-Delhi line, Howrah-Allahabad-Mumbai line and Howrah-Delhi main line, passes through this CD Block and there is a station at Talit.

The Bardhaman-Katwa line after conversion from narrow gauge to electrified broad gauge was opened to the public on 12 January 2018. There are stations at Kamnara, Khetia and Chamardighi railway station.

Kolkata-Delhi NH 19 (old numbering NH 2)/ Grand Trunk Road passes through this CD Block.

SH 7 running from Rajgram (in Birbhum district) to Midnapore (in Paschim Medinipur district) and SH 8 running from Santaldih (in Purulia district) to Majhdia (in Nadia district) cross at Mirzapur in this CD Block.

SH 13 running from Mollarpui Maghipara (in Birbhum district) to Dankuni (in Hooghly district) crosses NH 19 at Goda.

== Education ==
In 2013-14, Burdwan I CD Block had 117 primary schools with 11,426 students, 10 middle schools with 755 students, 14 high schools with 9,008 students and 12 higher secondary schools with 11,225 students. Burdwan I CD Block had 2 technical/ professional institution with 200 students and 277 institutions for special and non-formal education with 13,420 students

As per the 2011 census, in Burdwan I CD block, amongst the 75 inhabited villages, 5 villages did not have schools, 35 villages had two or more primary schools, 30 villages had at least 1 primary and 1 middle school and 23 villages had at least 1 middle and 1 secondary school.

More than 6,000 schools (in erstwhile Bardhaman district) serve cooked midday meal to more than 900,000 students.

College of Agriculture (Extended Campus of Bidhan Chandra Krishi Viswavidalaya) near Nari.

Burdwan Institute of Management and Computer Science at Dewandighi, Mirzapur was established in 2001.

== Healthcare ==
In 2014, Burdwan I CD Block had 1 block primary health centres and 2 primary health centres with total 18 beds and 4 doctors (excluding private bodies). It had 24 family welfare subcentres. 1,640 patients were treated indoor and 185,275 patients were treated outdoor in the hospitals, health centres and subcentres of the CD Block.

Kurmun block primary health centre at Kurmun (with 10 beds) is the main medical facility in Burdwan I CD block. There are primary health centres at Baghat (with 4 beds) and Jamar, PO Korar (with 10 beds).

Burdwan I CD Block is one of the areas of Bardhaman district which is affected by a moderately high level of arsenic contamination of groundwater.

== Notable people ==
- Zamindar family of Kashiara
  - Nawab Abdul Jabbar (1837–1918), bureaucrat and deputy magistrate
  - Abul Kasem (1872–1936), politician
  - Khan Bahadur Abdul Momen (1876–1946), civil servant
  - Abul Hashim (1905–1974), politician
  - Badruddin Umar (born 1931), Marxist–Leninist theorist and political activist
