= Malandighi =

- Village
- Location in West Bengal, India Malandighi (India)
- Coordinates: 23.564199°N 87.401695°E
- Country: India
- State: West Bengal
- District: Paschim Bardhaman

Population (2011)
  - Total: 2,590

Languages*
  - Official: Bengali, English
- Time zone: UTC+5:30 (IST)
- PIN: 713212
- Telephone code: 91 341
- Lok Sabha constituency: Bardhaman-Durgapur
- Vidhan Sabha constituency: Durgapur Purba
- Website: pascimbardhaman.co.in

Malandighi (also spelled Molandighi) is a village and a gram panchayat in Kanksa CD block in the Durgapur subdivision of the Paschim Bardhaman district in the Indian state of West Bengal.

== Geography ==
Cities and towns in the southern and eastern portions of Durgapur subdivision in Paschim Bardhaman district
MC: Municipal Corporation, CT: census town, R: rural centre, A: airport, B: barrage, H: historical site
Owing to space constraints in the small map, the actual locations in a larger map may vary slightly

=== Urbanisation ===
According to the 2011 census, 79.22% of the population of Durgapur subdivision was urban and 20.78% was rural. Durgapur subdivision has 1 municipal corporation at Durgapur and 38 (+1 partly) census towns (partly presented in the map alongside; all places marked on the map are linked in the full-screen map).

=== Location ===
Malandighi is located at 23.564199°N 87.401695°E.

== Demographics ==
According to the 2011 Census of India, Malandighi had a total population of 2,590 of which 1,289 (50%) were males and 1,301 (50%) were females. Population in the age range 0–6 years was 287. The total number of literate persons in Malandighi was 1,537 (66.74% of the population over 6 years).

*For language details see Kanksa (community development block)#Language and religion

== Education ==
Sanaka Education Trusts Group of Institutions, established in 2006, has set up a private engineering college at Malandighi.

Malandighi Durgadas Vidyamandir is a Bengali-medium coeducational institution established in 1953. It has facilities for teaching from class V to class XII. The school has 11 computers, a library with 25 books and a playground.

Malandighi Junior Girls’ High School is a Bengali-medium girls only institution established in 2014. It has facilities for teaching from class V to class VIII.

Kuldiha Junior High School is a Bengali-medium coeducational institution established in 2010. It has facilities for teaching from class V to class VIII.

Rakshitpur High School is a Bengali-medium coeducational institution established in 1954. It has facilities for teaching from class V to class X.

== Healthcare ==
There is a primary health centre with 6 beds, at Malandighi.
