= Galsi, Bardhaman =

Galsi
- Village
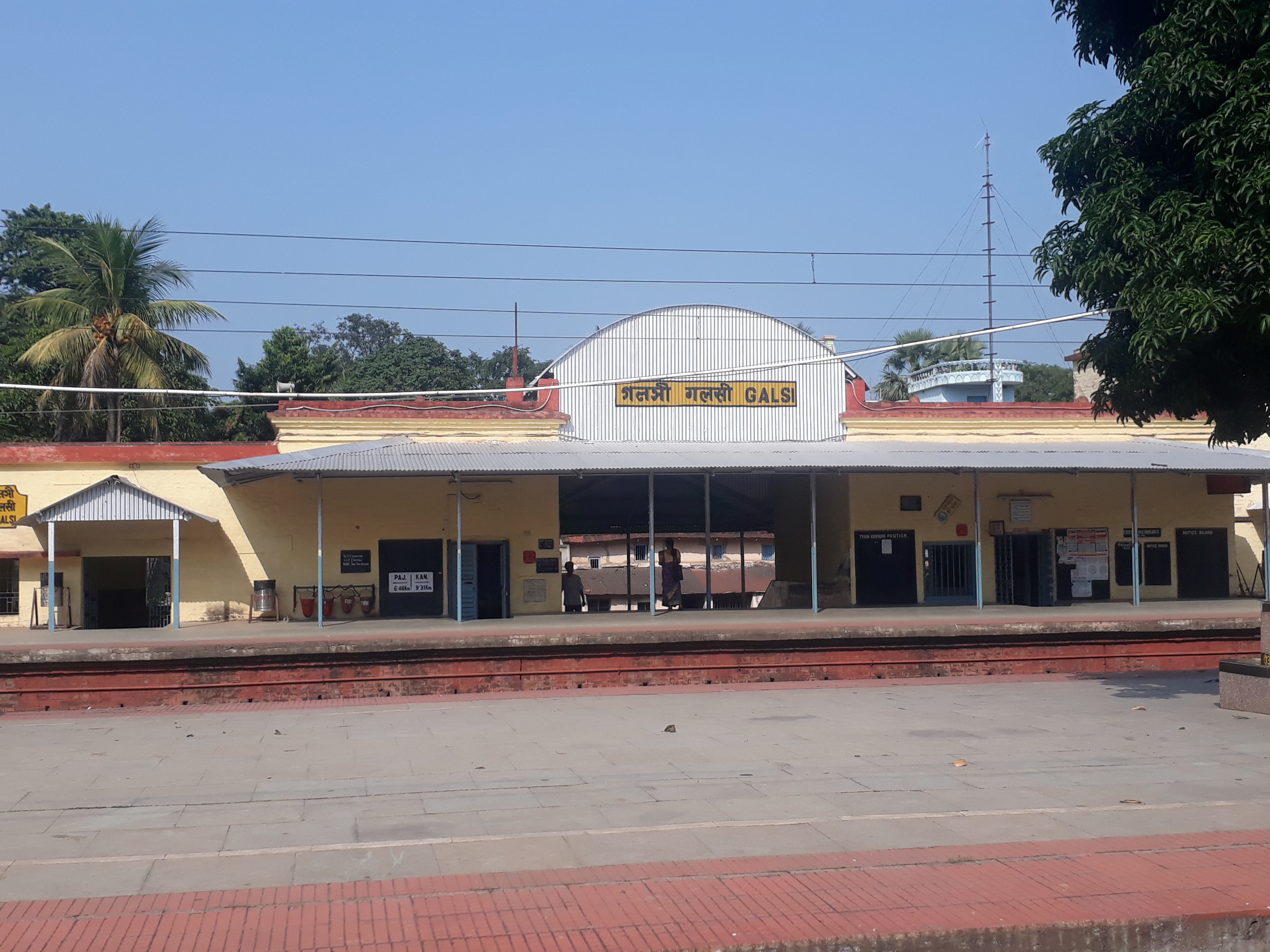
- Galsi

- Location in West Bengal, India Galsi (India)
- Coordinates: 23°20′14.0″N 87°41′33.0″E
- Country: India
- State: West Bengal
- District: Purba Bardhaman

Population (2011)
  - Total: 10,700

Languages
  - Official: Bengali, English
- Time zone: UTC+5:30 (IST)
- PIN: 713406 (Galsi)
- Telephone/STD code: 0342
- Lok Sabha constituency: Bardhaman-Durgapur
- Vidhan Sabha constituency: Galsi
- Website: purbabardhaman.gov.in

Galsi is a village in Galsi II CD Block in Bardhaman Sadar North subdivision of Purba Bardhaman district in the state of West Bengal, India.

== Overview ==
Galsi lies in the Bardhaman Plain, the central plain area of the district. Bardhaman Sadar North subdivision extends from the Kanksa Ketugram plain, which lies along the Ajay on the north to the Bardhaman Plain, the central plain area of the district, with the Damodar on the south and the east.

== Geography ==
=== Urbanisation ===
73.58% of the population of Bardhaman Sadar North subdivision live in the rural areas. Only 26.42% of the population live in the urban areas, and that is the highest proportion of urban population amongst the four subdivisions in Purba Bardhaman district. The map alongside presents some of the notable locations in the subdivision. All places marked in the map are linked in the larger full screen map.

Cities and towns in the Bardhaman Sadar North subdivision of Purba Bardhaman district
M: municipal city/ town, CT: census town, R: rural/ urban centre, H: historical site, W: river project, C: craft centre
Owing to space constraints in the small map, the actual locations in a larger map may vary slightly

=== Police station ===
Galsi police station has jurisdiction over Galsi II and a part of Galsi I CD blocks. The area covered is 294.4 km.^{2}

=== CD block HQ ===
The headquarters of Galsi II CD block are located at Galsi.

== Demographics ==
As per 2011 Census of India Galsi had a total population of 10,700 of which 5,394 (50%) were males and 5,306 (50%) were females. Population below 6 years was 1,094. The total number of literates in Galsi was 7,193 (74.88% of the population over 6 years).

== Transport ==
Galsi is a station on the Bardhaman-Asansol section, which is a part of Howrah-Gaya-Delhi line, Howrah-Allahabad-Mumbai line and Howrah-Delhi main line.

NH 19 (old numbering NH 2)/ Grand Trunk Road passes through Galsi.

== Education ==
Galsi Mahavidyalaya was established at Galsi in 2007 by Left Front Government.

Galsi High School was established in 1935. A Co Ed Bengali medium school it has arrangements for teaching from Class V to Class XII.

Galsi Sarada Vidyapith was established in 1961. A girls only Bengali medium school it has arrangements for teaching from Class V to Class XII.

Galsi High School, a boys only high school, Galsi Kalimati Debi High School, a coeducational high school and Galsi Sarda Vidyapith, a girls high school, are affiliated with the West Bengal Board of Secondary Education. Galsi High School, a co-educational higher secondary unit, is affiliated with West Bengal Council of Higher Secondary Education for higher secondary classes.
