= Galsi II =

- Community development block
- Location in West Bengal
- Coordinates: 23°20′14″N 87°41′33″E
- Country: India
- State: West Bengal
- District: Purba Bardhaman
- Parliamentary constituency: Bardhaman-Durgapur, Bishnupur
- Assembly constituency: Galsi, Khandaghosh

Area
  - Total: 219.09 km^{2} (84.59 sq mi)
- Elevation: 47 m (154 ft)

Population (2011)
  - Total: 147,177
  - Density: 671.77/km^{2} (1,739.9/sq mi)
- Time zone: UTC+5.30 (IST)
- PIN: 713406 (Galsi); 713141 (Khana Jn.)
- Area code: 03452
- Vehicle registration: WB-37,WB-38,WB-41,WB-42,WB-44
- Literacy Rate: 70.05 per cent
- Website: http://purbabardhaman.gov.in/

Galsi II is a community development block that forms an administrative division in Bardhaman Sadar North subdivision of Purba Bardhaman district in the Indian state of West Bengal.

== Buddhist Stupa (Bardanga) ==
The University of Burdwan, in collaboration with the Archaeological Survey of India, carried out excavations near Monorampur, a newly developed village. Several statues of Gautama Buddha were found and the remains of a Buddhist stupa was unearthed. In 1994–95, the Burdwan Gazeteer had commented that the style of construction indicated that the stupa at Monorampur was built during 7-9th century. The lower portions of the excavations indicated the presence of a Neolithic-Chalcolithic habitation which remained deserted till the time of construction of the stupa. The place can be reached from Randiha dam.[1]

== Geography ==
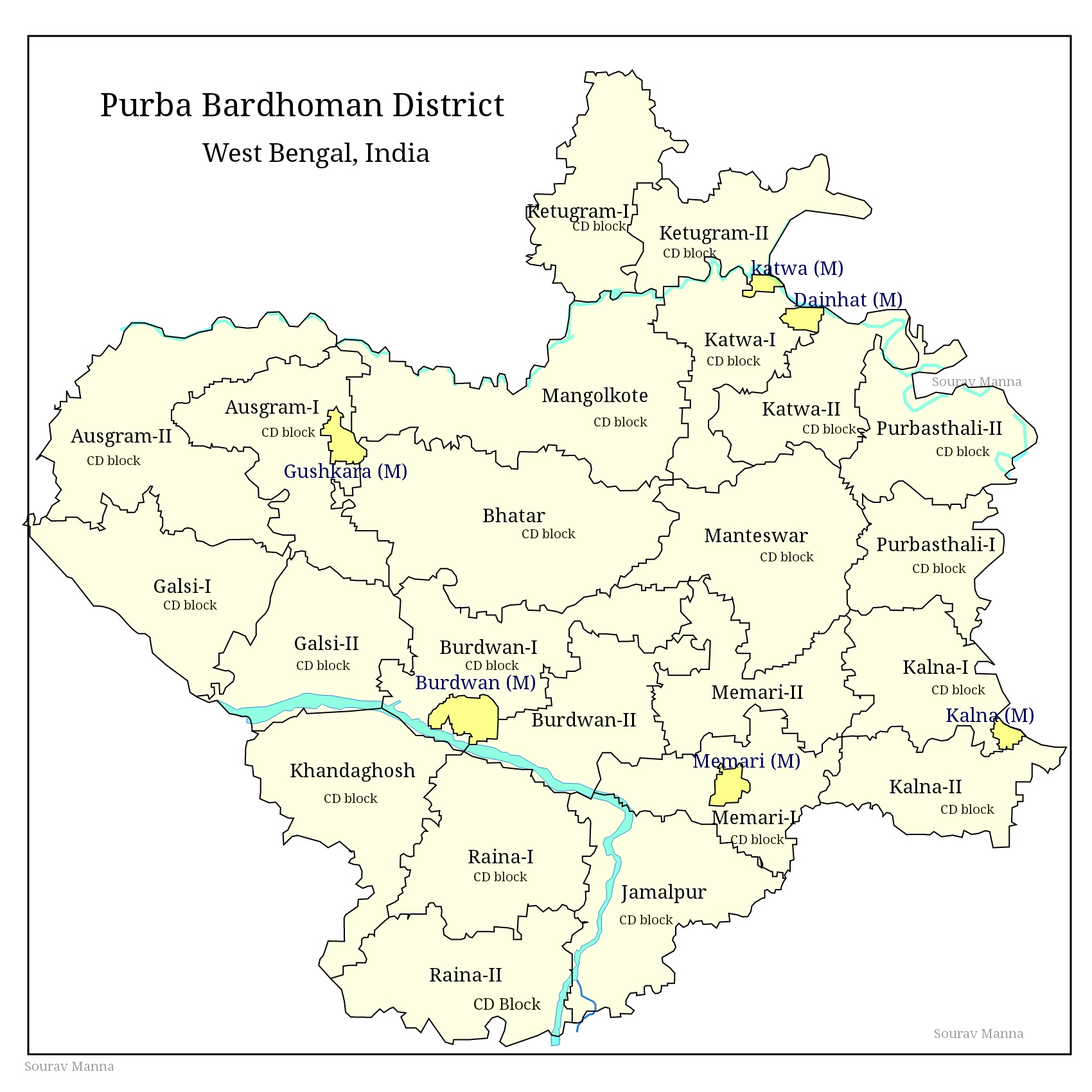
CD blocks of Purba Bardhaman district

=== Location ===
Galsi is located at 23°20′14″N 87°41′33″E.

Galsi II CD Block is part of the Bardhaman Plain, the central plain area of the district. The area is surrounded by the Bhagirathi on the east, the Ajay on the north-west and the Damodar on the west and south. Old river channels and small creeks found in the region dry up in the dry season, but the Bardhaman Plains are sometimes subject to heavy floods during the rainy season. The region has recent alluvial soils.

Galsi II CD Block is bounded by Ausgram I CD Block on the north, Burdwan I CD Block on the east, Khandaghosh CD Block on the south and Indas CD Block, in Bankura district, and Galsi I CD Block on the west.

Galsi II CD Block has an area of 219.09 km^{2}. It has 1 panchayat samity, 9 gram panchayats, 116 gram sansads (village councils), 73 mouzas and 73 inhabited villages. Galsi police station serves this block. Headquarters of this CD Block is at Galsi.

Gram panchayats of Galsi II block/panchayat samiti are: Adra, Bhuri, Galsi, Gohogram, Khano, Kurkuba, Masjidpur, Sanko and Satinadi.

== Demographics ==
=== Population ===
As per the 2011 Census of India Galsi II CD Block had a total population of 147,177, all of which were rural. There were 74,751 (51%) males and 72,426 (49%) females. Population below 6 years was 15,594. Scheduled Castes numbered 58,342 (39.64%) and Scheduled Tribes numbered 7,652 (4.08%).

As per 2001 census, Galsi II block had a total population of 133,951, out of which 68,641 were males and 65,310 were females. Galsi II block registered a population growth of 11.82 per cent during the 1991-2001 decade. Decadal growth for Bardhaman district was 14.36 per cent. Decadal growth in West Bengal was 17.84 per cent. Scheduled castes at 55,012 formed more than one-third the population. Scheduled tribes numbered 9,127.

Large villages (with 4,000+ population) in Galsi II CD Block are (2011 census figures in brackets): Galsi (10,700), Gohagram (4,058), Bahirghanya (5,116), Khano (5,400), Satinandi (6,954) and Sanko (9,580).

Other villages in Galsi II CD Block include (2011census figures in brackets): Adra (3,774), Kurkuba (2,714), Maszidpur (2,163), Bhuri (2,805) and Channa (2,465).

=== Literacy ===
As per the 2011 census the total number of literates in Galsi II CD Block was 92,178 (70.05% of the population over 6 years) out of which males numbered 51,594 (77.28% of the male population over 6 years) and females numbered 40,584 (62.61% of the female population over 6 years). The gender disparity (the difference between female and male literacy rates) was 14.66%.

As per 2001 census, Galsi II block had a total literacy of 64.54 per cent for the 6+ age group. While male literacy was 74.42 per cent female literacy was 54.05 per cent. Bardhaman district had a total literacy of 70.18 per cent, male literacy being 78.63 per cent and female literacy being 60.95 per cent.

See also – List of West Bengal districts ranked by literacy rate

Literacy in CD blocks of
Bardhaman district
Bardhaman Sadar North subdivision
Ausgram I – 69.39%
Ausgram II – 68.00%
Bhatar – 71.56%
Burdwan I – 76.07%
Burdwan II – 74.12%
Galsi II – 70.05%
Bardhaman Sadar South subdivision
Khandaghosh – 77.28%
Raina I – 80.20%
Raina II – 81.48%
Jamalpur – 74.08%
Memari I – 74.10%
Memari II – 74.59%
Kalna subdivision
Kalna I – 75.81%
Kalna II – 76.25%
Manteswar – 73.08%
Purbasthali I – 77.59%
Purbasthali II – 70.35%
Katwa subdivision
Katwa I – 70.36%
Katwa II – 69.16%
Ketugram I – 68.00%
Ketugram II – 65.96%
Mongalkote – 67.97%
Durgapur subdivision
Andal – 77.25%
Faridpur Durgapur – 74.14%
Galsi I – 72.81%
Kanksa – 76.34%
Pandabeswar – 73.01%
Asansol subdivision
Barabani – 69.58%
Jamuria – 69.42%
Raniganj – 73.86%
Salanpur – 78.76%
2011 Census: CD Block Wise

Primary Census Abstract Data

=== Languages and religion ===
Religion in Burdwan I CD block (2011)
| Hinduism | 74.78% |
| Islam | 24.74% |
| Other or not stated | 0.48% |

In the 2011 census Hindus numbered 110,055 and formed 74.78% of the population in Galsi II CD Block. Muslims numbered 36,410 and formed 24.74% of the population. Christians numbered 504 and formed 0.34% of the population. Others numbered 208 and formed 0.14% of the population.

In Bardhaman district the percentage of Hindu population has been declining from 84.3% in 1961 to 77.9% in 2011 and the percentage of Muslim population has increased from 15.2% in 1961 to 20.7% in 2011.

Languages of Galsi II CD block (2011)
1. Bengali (93.0%)
2. Santali (5.90%)
3. Others (1.10%)

At the time of the 2011 census, 93.00% of the population spoke Bengali and 5.90% Santali as their first language.

== Rural poverty ==
As per poverty estimates obtained from household survey for families living below poverty line in 2005, rural poverty in Galsi II CD Block was 29.42%.

== Economy ==
=== Livelihood ===
In Galsi II CD Block in 2011, amongst the class of total workers, cultivators formed 15.23%, agricultural labourers 60.69%, household industry workers 2.14% and other workers 21.95%.

Galsi II CD Block is part of the area where agriculture dominates the scenario but the secondary and tertiary sectors have shown an increasing trend.

=== Infrastructure ===
There are 73 inhabited villages in Galsi II CD block. All 73 villages (100%) have power supply. All 73 villages (100%) have drinking water supply. 18 villages (24.66%) have post offices. All 73 villages (100%) have telephones (including landlines, public call offices and mobile phones). 15 villages (20.55%) have a pucca (paved) approach road and 46 villages (63.01%) have transport communication (includes bus service, rail facility and navigable waterways). 11 villages (15.07%) have agricultural credit societies. 6 villages (8.22%) have banks.

In 2013–14, there were 92 fertiliser depots, 8 seed stores and 56 fair price shops in the CD Block.

=== Agriculture ===
Persons engaged in agriculture
in Galsi II CD Block
1. Bargadars (4.90%)
2. Patta holders (16.6%)
3. Small farmers (4.37%)
4. Marginal farmers (14.3%)
5. Agricultural labourers (59.8%)

Although the Bargadari Act of 1950 recognised the rights of bargadars to a higher share of crops from the land that they tilled, it was not implemented fully. Large tracts, beyond the prescribed limit of land ceiling, remained with the rich landlords. From 1977 onwards major land reforms took place in West Bengal. Land in excess of land ceiling was acquired and distributed amongst the peasants. Following land reforms land ownership pattern has undergone transformation. In 2013–14, persons engaged in agriculture in Galsi II CD Block could be classified as follows: bargadars 4.90%, patta (document) holders 16.64%, small farmers (possessing land between 1 and 2 hectares) 4.37%, marginal farmers (possessing land up to 1 hectare) 14.31% and agricultural labourers 59.78%.

In 2003-04 net cropped area in Galsi II CD Block was 17,340 hectares and the area in which more than one crop was grown was 18,399 hectares.

In 2013–14, Galsi II CD Block produced 71,705 tonnes of Aman paddy, the main winter crop, from 22,634 hectares, 28,872 tonnes of Boro paddy (spring crop) from 8,705 hectares and 22,833 tonnes of potatoes from 1,840 hectares. It also produced pulses and oilseeds.

In Bardhaman district as a whole Aman paddy constituted 64.32% of the total area under paddy cultivation, while the area under Boro and Aus paddy constituted 32.87% and 2.81% respectively. The expansion of Boro paddy cultivation, with higher yield rates, was the result of expansion of irrigation system and intensive cropping. In 2013–14, the total area irrigated in Galsi II CD Block was 18,538.49 hectares, out of which 18,433.45 hectares were irrigated by canal water and 105.14 hectares by deep tube wells.

=== Banking ===
In 2013–14, Galsi II CD Block had offices of 6 commercial banks and 3 gramin banks.

== Transport ==
Galsi II CD Block has 1 ferry service and 8 originating/ terminating bus routes.

The Bardhaman-Asansol section, which is a part of Howrah-Gaya-Delhi line, Howrah-Allahabad-Mumbai line and Howrah-Delhi main line, passes through this CD Block and there are stations at Galsi and Khana.

The Khana-Barharwa section of Sahibganj Loop passes through the CD Block and there is a station at Khana.

NH 19 (old numbering NH 2)/ Grand Trunk Road passes through this CD Block.

== Education ==
In 2013–14, Galsi II CD Block had 110 primary schools with 7,448 students, 6 middle schools with 393 students, 15 high schools with 9,544 students and 8 higher secondary schools with 6,808 students. Galsi II CD Block had 1 general college with 1,464 students, 1 technical/ professional institution with 100 students and 251 institutions for special and non-formal education with 8,485 students

As per the 2011 census, in Galsi II CD block, amongst the 73 inhabited villages, 1 village did not have a school, 37 villages had two or more primary schools, 25 villages had at least 1 primary and 1 middle school and 16 villages had at least 1 middle and 1 secondary school.

More than 6,000 schools (in erstwhile Bardhaman district) serve cooked midday meal to more than 900,000 students.

Galsi Mahavidyalaya was established at Galsi in 2007.

== Healthcare ==
In 2014, Galsi II CD Block had 1 block primary health centre and 2 primary health centres with total 29 beds and 3 doctors (excluding private bodies). It had 24 family welfare subcentres. 3,099 patients were treated indoor and 199,203 patients were treated outdoor in the hospitals, health centres and subcentres of the CD Block.

Adrahati block primary health centre at Adrahati (with 15 beds) is the main medical facility in Galsi II CD block. There are primary health centres at: Bhuri (with 10 beds) and Satinadi, PO Khana Junction (with 10 beds).

Galsi II CD Block is one of the areas of Bardhaman district which is affected by a moderately high level of arsenic contamination of ground water.
