= Kanksa (community development block) =

- Community development block
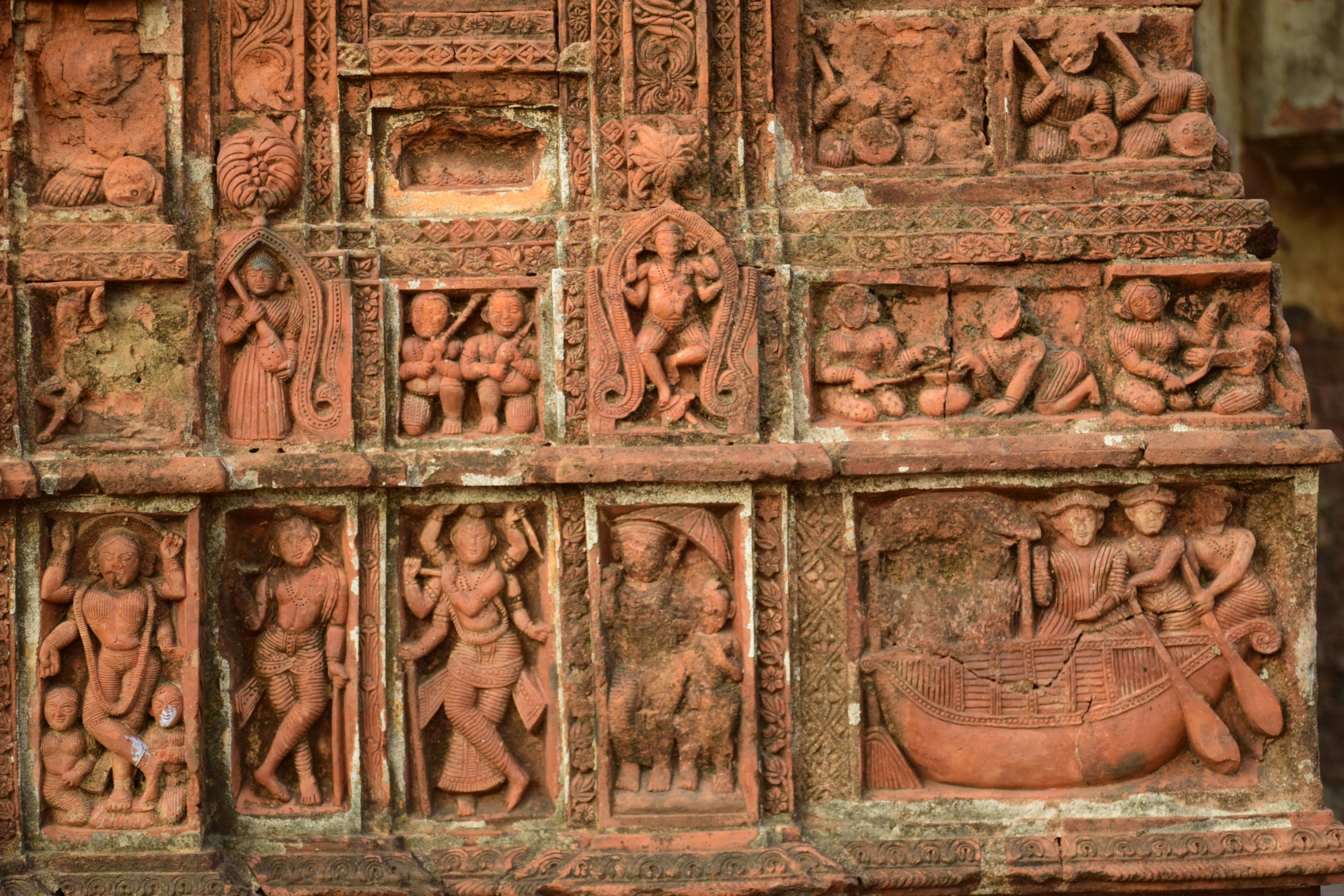
- Terracotta panels at Bankati temple

- Location in West Bengal
- Coordinates: 23°28′16″N 87°27′16″E
- Country: India
- State: West Bengal
- District: Paschim Bardhaman
- Parliamentary constituency: Bardhaman-Durgapur
- Assembly constituency: Galsi, Durgapur Purba

Area
  - Total: 107.89 sq mi (279.44 km^{2})
- Elevation: 230 ft (70 m)

Population (2011)
  - Total: 178,125
  - Density: 1,651.0/sq mi (637.44/km^{2})
- Time zone: UTC+5.30 (IST)
- PIN: 713148 (Panagarh Bazar); 713172 (Trilokchandpur)
- Telephone/STD code: 0343
- Vehicle registration: WB-37,WB-38,WB-41,WB-42,WB-44
- Literacy Rate: 76.34 per cent
- Website: http://bardhaman.gov.in/

Kanksa is a community development block that forms an administrative division in Durgapur subdivision of Paschim Bardhaman district in the Indian state of West Bengal.

== Geography ==
Kanksa is located at 23°28′16″N 87°27′16″E.

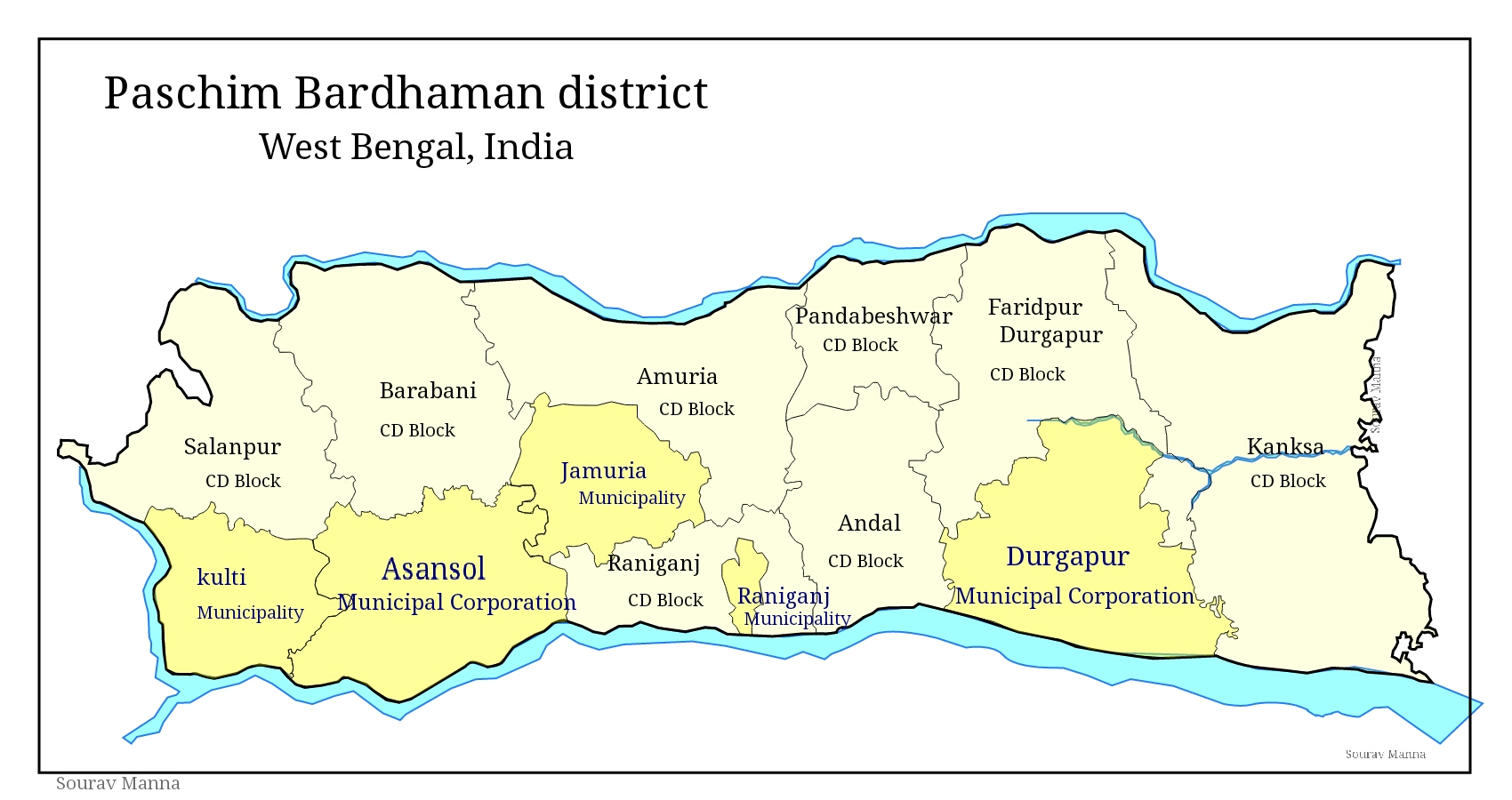
Map of Paschim Bardhaman district

Kanksa CD Block is part of the Kanksa Ketugram plain, which lies along the Ajay. The river forms a boundary with Birbhum district on the north for a long stretch and then flows through district. The uneven laterite territory found in the western part of Bardhaman district extends up to Ausgram and then the alluvial flood plains commence. The entire Durgapur-Kanksa-Faridpur-Ausgram area was densely forested even in more recent times. The influx of refugees from East Pakistan and their rehabilitation in the area, and irrigation facilities extended by Damodar Valley Corporation led to destruction of much of the forests in the area, but some still remain.

Kanksa CD Block is bounded by Ilambazar CD Block, in Birbhum district, on the north, Ausgram II and Galsi II CD Blocks on the east, Barjora and Sonamukhi CD Blocks, in Bankura district, on the south and Faridpur Durgapur CD Block on the west.

Kanksa CD Block has an area of 279.44 km^{2}. It has 1 panchayat samity, 7 gram panchayats, 132 gram sansads (village councils), 86 mouzas and 77 inhabited villages. Kanksa police station serves this block. Headquarters of this CD Block is at Kanksa.

Gram panchayats of Kanksa block/panchayat samiti are: Amalajore, Bidbihar, Bonkati, Gopalpur, Kanksa, Molandighi and Trilokchandrapur.

== Demographics ==
=== Population ===
As per the 2011 Census of India Kanksa CD Block had a total population of 178,125, of which 103,594 were rural and 74,531 were urban. There were 91,350 (51%) males and 86,775 (49%) females. Population below 6 years was 20,210. Scheduled Castes numbered 62,239 (34.99%) and Scheduled Tribes numbered 18,239 (10.24%).

As per 2001 census, Kanksa block had a total population of 151,255, out of which 78,669 were males and 72,586 were females. Kanksa block registered a population growth of 17.71 per cent during the 1991-2001 decade. Decadal growth for Bardhaman district was 14.36 per cent. Decadal growth in West Bengal was 17.84 per cent. Scheduled castes at 59,956 formed around one-third the population. Scheduled tribes numbered 15,290.

Census Towns in Kanksa CD Block are (2011 census figures in brackets): Arra (7,808), Gopalpur (15,967), Bamunara (6,665), Amlajora (5,856), Kanksa (23,789), Debipur (9,967) and Prayagpur (4,479).

Large villages (with 4,000+ population) in Kanksa CD Block are (2011 census figures in brackets): Basudha (5,166), Ijjatganj (4,085) and Panagarh (5,510),

Other villages in Kanksa CD Block included (2011census figures in brackets): Bidbihar (206), Bankati (1,255), Malandighi (2,590), Banskopa (2,711), Tilakchandrapur (1,970), Gourangapur (110) and Sibpur (1953).

=== Literacy ===
As per the 2011 census the total number of literates in Kanksa CD Block was 120,545 (76.34% of the population over 6 years) out of which males numbered 67,797 (82.05% of the male population over 6 years) and females numbered 52,748 (68.62% of the female population over 6 years). The gender disparity (the difference between female and male literacy rates) was 15.03%.

As per 2001 census, Kanksa block had a total literacy of 68.05 per cent for the 6+ age group. While male literacy was 78.24 per cent female literacy was 56.96 per cent. Bardhaman district had a total literacy of 70.18 per cent, male literacy being 78.63 per cent and female literacy being 60.95 per cent.

See also – List of West Bengal districts ranked by literacy rate

Literacy in CD blocks of
Bardhaman district
Bardhaman Sadar North subdivision
Ausgram I – 69.39%
Ausgram II – 68.00%
Bhatar – 71.56%
Burdwan I – 76.07%
Burdwan II – 74.12%
Galsi II – 70.05%
Bardhaman Sadar South subdivision
Khandaghosh – 77.28%
Raina I – 80.20%
Raina II – 81.48%
Jamalpur – 74.08%
Memari I – 74.10%
Memari II – 74.59%
Kalna subdivision
Kalna I – 75.81%
Kalna II – 76.25%
Manteswar – 73.08%
Purbasthali I – 77.59%
Purbasthali II – 70.35%
Katwa subdivision
Katwa I – 70.36%
Katwa II – 69.16%
Ketugram I – 68.00%
Ketugram II – 65.96%
Mongalkote – 67.97%
Durgapur subdivision
Andal – 77.25%
Faridpur Durgapur – 74.14%
Galsi I – 72.81%
Kanksa – 76.34%
Pandabeswar – 73.01%
Asansol subdivision
Barabani – 69.58%
Jamuria – 69.42%
Raniganj – 73.86%
Salanpur – 78.76%
2011 Census: CD Block Wise

Primary Census Abstract Data

=== Language and religion ===
Religion in Kanksa CD block (2011)
Hinduism	91.61%
Islam	6.82%
Other (tribal religion)	0.52%
Other or not stated	1.05%

In the 2011 census Hindus numbered 163,186 and formed 91.61% of the population in Kanksa CD Block. Muslims numbered 12,157 and formed 6.82% of the population. Christians numbered 386 and formed 0.22% of the population. Others numbered 2,396 and formed 1.35% of the population.

Languages of Kanksa CD block (2011)
1. Bengali (79.7%)
2. Hindi (9.95%)
3. Santali (9.18%)
4. Others (1.19%)

At the time of the 2011 census, 79.68% of the population spoke Bengali, 9.95% Hindi, and 9.18% Santali as their first language.

== Rural poverty ==
As per poverty estimates obtained from household survey for families living below poverty line in 2005, rural poverty in Kanksa CD Block was 34.23%.

== Economy ==
=== Livelihood ===
Livelihood
in Kanksa CD Block
1. Cultivators (9.08%)
2. Agricultural labourers (30.2%)
3. Household industries (3.46%)
4. Other Workers (57.3%)

In Kanksa CD Block in 2011, amongst the class of total workers, cultivators numbered 6,850 and formed 9.08% of the total workers, agricultural labourers numbered 22,793 and formed 30.20%, household industry workers numbered 2,611 and formed 3.46% and other workers numbered 43,226 and formed 57.27%. Total workers numbered 75,480 and formed 42.37% of the total population, and non-workers numbered 102,645 and formed 57.63% of the population.

In Kanksa CD Block, although cultivators or agricultural labourers formed a good proportion of the workforce, comparatively more workers were engaged in the secondary and tertiary sectors.

Note: In the census records a person is considered a cultivator, if the person is engaged in cultivation/ supervision of land owned by self/government/institution. When a person who works on another person's land for wages in cash or kind or share, is regarded as an agricultural labourer. Household industry is defined as an industry conducted by one or more members of the family within the household or village, and one that does not qualify for registration as a factory under the Factories Act. Other workers are persons engaged in some economic activity other than cultivators, agricultural labourers and household workers. It includes factory, mining, plantation, transport and office workers, those engaged in business and commerce, teachers, entertainment artistes and so on.

=== Infrastructure ===
All 86 or 100% of mouzas in Kanksa CD Block were electrified by 31 March 2014.

All 86 mouzas in Kanksa CD Block had drinking water facilities in 2013-14. There were 52 fertiliser depots, 4 seed stores and 36 fair price shops in the CD Block.

=== Agriculture ===
Although the Bargadari Act of 1950 recognised the rights of bargadars to a higher share of crops from the land that they tilled, it was not implemented fully. Large tracts, beyond the prescribed limit of land ceiling, remained with the rich landlords. From 1977 onwards major land reforms took place in West Bengal. Land in excess of land ceiling was acquired and distributed amongst the peasants. Following land reforms land ownership pattern has undergone transformation. In 2013-14, persons engaged in agriculture in Kanksa CD Block could be classified as follows: bargadars 12.96%, patta (document) holders 20.03%, small farmers (possessing land between 1 and 2 hectares) 3.31%, marginal farmers (possessing land up to 1 hectare) 11.59% and agricultural labourers 49.11%.

In 2003-04 net cropped area in Kanksa CD Block was 11,613 hectares and the area in which more than one crop was grown was 5,268 hectares.

In 2013-14, Kanksa CD Block produced 30,815 tonnes of Aman paddy, the main winter crop from 10,211 hectares, 862 tonnes of Boro paddy (spring crop) from 237 hectares, 380 tonnes of wheat from 120 hectares, 10,825 tonnes of potatoes from 413 hectares and 120 tonnes of sugarcane from 2 hectares. It also produced pulses and oilseeds.

In 2013-14, the total area irrigated in Kanksa CD Block was 1,473.03 hectares, out of which 1,007.58 hectares were irrigated by canal water, 438.17 hectares by river lift irrigation and 27.28 hectares by deep tube wells.

=== Banking ===
In 2013-14, Kanksa CD Block had offices of 9 commercial banks and 3 gramin banks.

== Transport ==
Kanksa CD Block has 7 originating/ terminating bus routes.

The Bardhaman-Asansol section, which is a part of Howrah-Gaya-Delhi line, Howrah-Allahabad-Mumbai line and Howrah-Delhi main line, passes through this CD Block and there are stations at Panagarh and Rajbandh.

NH 19 (old numbering NH 2)/ Grand Trunk Road passes through this CD Block.

State Highway 14 (West Bengal), running from Dubrajpur (in Birbhum district) to Betai (in Nadia district), of which a section of Panagarh-Morgram Highway is a part, passes through this CD Block.

== Education ==
In 2013-14, Kanksa CD Block had 107 primary schools with 8,035 students, 8 middle schools with 631 students, 11 high school with 6,265 students and 10 higher secondary schools with 9.870 students. Kanksa CD Block had 8 technical/ professional institutions with 3,613 students, 403 institutions for special and non-formal education with 10,656 students

Aryabhatta Institute of Engineering & Management was established at Panagarh in 2003. It is affiliated with Maulana Abul Kalam Azad University of Technology.

Durgapur Institute of Advanced Technology and Management was established at Rajbandh in 2002. It is affiliated with Maulana Abul Kalam Azad University of Technology.

Durgapur College of Commerce and Science was established in 2003 at Rajbandh.

Ayan Arnab Sikshan Sanstha at Ajodhya, Bonkati, Panagarh offers BEd courses, was established in 2014.

== Healthcare ==
In 2014, Kanksa CD Block had 1 block primary health centre, 4 primary health centres and 3 private nursing homes with total 39 beds and 4 doctors (excluding private bodies). It had 26 family welfare subcentres. 2,644 patients were treated indoor and 186,363 patients were treated outdoor in the hospitals, health centres and subcentres of the CD Block.

Panagarh Rural Hospital, with 30 beds, at Panagarh, is the major government medical facility in the Kanksa CD block. There are primary health centres at Malandighi (with 6 beds), Shibpur (with 6 beds), Shyambazar (with 6 beds) and Silambazar (with 10 beds).

== See also ==
- Kanksa (Vidhan Sabha constituency)
