= Bardhaman Uttar Assembly constituency =

Bardhaman Uttar
- Constituency No. 266 for the West Bengal Legislative Assembly
- Interactive Map Outlining Bardhaman Uttar Assembly Constituency

Constituency details
- Country: India
- Region: East India
- State: West Bengal
- District: Purba Bardhaman
- Lok Sabha constituency: Bardhaman–Durgapur
- Established: 1951
- Total electors: 210,773
- Reservation: SC

Member of Legislative Assembly
- 18th West Bengal Legislative Assembly
- Incumbent Nisith Kumar Malik
- Party: DTC
- Elected year: 2026

Bardhaman Uttar Assembly constituency is an assembly constituency in Purba Bardhaman district in the Indian state of West Bengal. It is reserved for scheduled castes.

== Overview ==
As per order of the Delimitation Commission, No. 266 Bardhaman Uttar Assembly constituency (SC) covers Burdwan II community development block and Belkash, Bandul I, Rayan I, Rayan II, Saraitikar, Baghar I and Baghar II gram panchayats of Burdwan I community development block.

Bardhaman Uttar assembly segment is part of No. 39 Bardhaman–Durgapur Lok Sabha constituency.

== Members of the Legislative Assembly ==
Year	Name	Party
Bardhaman
1951	Benoy Choudhury	Communist Party of India
1957	Benoy Choudhury	Communist Party of India
1962	Radharani Mahtab	Indian National Congress
Bardhaman Uttar
1967	Syed Shahedullah	Communist Party of India (Marxist)
1969	Debabrata Datta	Communist Party of India (Marxist)
1971	Debabrata Datta	Communist Party of India (Marxist)
1972	Kashinath Ta	Indian National Congress
1977	Dwarakanath Ta	Communist Party of India (Marxist)
1982	Ram Narayan Goswami	Communist Party of India (Marxist)
1987	Benoy Choudhuri	Communist Party of India (Marxist)
1991	Benoy Choudhuri	Communist Party of India (Marxist)
1996	Nisith Adhikary	Communist Party of India (Marxist)
2001	Nisith Adhikary	Communist Party of India (Marxist)
2006	Pradip Tah	Communist Party of India (Marxist)
2011	Aparna Saha	Communist Party of India (Marxist)
2016	Nisith Kumar Malik	Trinamool Congress
2021	Nisith Kumar Malik	Trinamool Congress
2026	Nisith Kumar Malik	Trinamool Congress

== Election results ==
=== 2026 ===
2026 West Bengal Legislative Assembly election: Bardhaman Uttar
Party	Candidate	Votes	%	±%
AITC	Nisith Kumar Malik	112,688	45.45	▼0.52
BJP	Sanjoy Das	106,228	42.85	▲4.02
CPI(M)	Mamoni Mondal Roy	19,465	7.85	▼4.98
NOTA	None of the above	3,771	1.52	▲0.53
Majority		6,460	2.6	▼4.54
Turnout		247,932	95.17	▲7.84
AITC hold		Swing		

=== 2021 ===
2021 West Bengal Legislative Assembly election: Bardhaman Uttar
Party	Candidate	Votes	%	±%
AITC	Nisith Kumar Malik	111,211	45.97	▼1.46
BJP	Radha Kanta Roy	93,943	38.83	▲31.79
CPI(M)	Chandi Charan Let	31,028	12.83	▼29.29
BSP	Ramkrishna Malik	3,347	1.38	▲0.59
NOTA	None of the above	2,396	0.99	
Majority		17,268	7.14	
Turnout		241,925	87.33	
AITC hold		Swing		

=== 2016 ===
2016 West Bengal Legislative Assembly election: Bardhaman Uttar
Party	Candidate	Votes	%	±%
AITC	Nisith Kumar Malik	102,886	47.43	▲3.93
CPI(M)	Aparna Saha	91,381	42.12	▼8.75
BJP	Prasanta Saha	15,275	7.04	▲4.13
NOTA	None of the above	3,401	1.57	New entry
CPI(ML)L	Tarun Kanti Majhi	2,275	1.05	▲0.35
BSP	Mahadev Malik	1,715	0.79	▼0.09
Majority		11,505	5.31	▼2.06
Turnout		2,16,933	88.27	▼3.11
AITC gain from CPI(M)		Swing		

=== 2011 ===
2011 West Bengal Legislative Assembly election: Bardhaman Uttar
Party	Candidate	Votes	%	±%
CPI(M)	Aparna Saha	98,182	50.87	
AITC	Nisith Kumar Malik	83,949	43.50	
BJP	Sunil Sen	5,607	2.91	
JD(U)	Dipu Chowdhury	2,228	1.15	
BSP	Jay Gopal Das	1,699	0.88	
CPI(ML)L	Tarun Kanti Majhi	1,342	0.70	
Majority		14,233	7.37	
Turnout		1,93,007	91.38	
CPI(M) hold		Swing		

=== 2006 ===
Pradip Tah of CPI (M) won the Bardhaman Uttar seat defeating his nearest rival Deb Narayan Guha of Trinamool Congress in the 2006 assembly elections. Contests in most years were multi cornered but only winners and runners are being mentioned. In 2001 and 1996, Nisith Adhikary of CPI (M) defeated Lakshmi Narayan Nayek and Raimoni Das (both of Congress) in the respective years. In 1991 and 1987, Benoy Krishna Chowdhury of CPI (M) defeated Sadhan Ghosh and Santosh Saha Sikdar (both of Congress) in the respective years. In 1982, Goswami Ramnarayan of CPI (M) defeated Lakshmi Narayan Rej of ICS. In 1977, Dwarka Nath Tah of CPI (M) won the seat defeating Sudhir Chandra Dawn of Congress. Kashinath Ta of Congress won the seat in 1972. Debabrata Dutta of CPI (M) won the seat in 1971 and 1969. Syed Shahedullah of CPI (M) won the seat in 1967.

=== 1962 ===
Radharani Mahtab of Congress won the Bardhaman seat in 1962. Benoy Choudhuri representing CPI won the seat in 1957 and 1951.
