= Bharatpur, Purba Bardhaman =

Bharatpur
- Village
- Location in West Bengal, India Bharatpur (India)
- Coordinates: 23.4134°N 87.4578°E
- Country: India
- State: West Bengal
- District: Purba Bardhaman

Population (2011)
  - Total: 4,274

Languages
  - Official: Bengali, English
- Time zone: UTC+5:30 (IST)
- PIN: 713148 (Bharatpur)
- Lok Sabha constituency: Bardhaman-Durgapur
- Vidhan Sabha constituency: Galsi
- Website: purbabardhaman.gov.in

Bharatpur is a village in Galsi I CD block in Bardhaman Sadar North subdivision of Purba Bardhaman district in the Indian state of West Bengal.

== History ==
Bharatpur is an ancient place. The University of Burdwan, in collaboration with the Archaeological Survey of India, carried out excavations at Bharatpur. Several statues of Gautama Buddha were found and the remains of a Buddhist stupa was unearthed. In 1994–95, the Burdwan Gazeteer had commented that the style of construction indicated that the stupa at Bharatpur was built during 7-9th century. The lower portions of the excavations indicated the presence of a Neolithic-Chalcolithic habitation which remained deserted till the time of construction of the stupa.

=== Under Kingdom of Gopbhum ===
As per Peterson's District Gazeteer of 1910, the south-western extremity of the Sadgop kingdom of Gopbhum was held by two kinglings, probably merely cadets of the house of Gopbhum, at Bharatpur and Kankeswar or Kanksa.

See also – Amrargar and Gourangapur for more information about Gopbhum.

== Geography ==
=== Location ===
Bharatpur is located at 23.4134°N 87.4578°E.

Bharatpur is on the banks of the Damodar, about 4 km south of Panagarh railway station.

== Demographics ==
As per the 2011 Census of India, Bharatpur had a total population of 4,274 of which 2,229 (52%) were males and 2,045 (48%) were females. Bharatpur's population below 6 years of age was 405. The total number of literates in Bharatpur was 2,841 (73.49% of the population over 6 years).

== Healthcare ==
There is a primary health centre at Bharatpur (with 6 beds).
