= Ausgram II =

- Community development block
- Location in West Bengal
- Coordinates: 23°32′08.5″N 87°39′42.5″E
- Country: India
- State: West Bengal
- District: Purba Bardhaman
- Parliamentary constituency: Bolpur
- Assembly constituency: Ausgram

Area
  - Total: 139.17 sq mi (360.45 km^{2})
- Elevation: 213 ft (65 m)

Population (2011)
  - Total: 150,896
  - Density: 1,084.3/sq mi (418.63/km^{2})
- Time zone: UTC+5.30 (IST)
- PIN: 713126 (Bhedia)
- Telephone/STD code: 03452
- Vehicle registration: WB-37, WB-38, WB-41, WB-42, WB-44
- Literacy Rate: 68.00 per cent
- Website: http://purbabardhaman.gov.in/

Ausgram II is a community development block. It is a municipality in Bardhaman Sadar North subdivision of Purba Bardhaman district in the Indian state of West Bengal.

== History ==
=== Pre-history ===
Studies at the nearby Pandu Rajar Dhibi archeological site have found, overall, six layers of occupation. There are traces of a civilisation similar to the Indus Valley Bronze Age civilisation found at Harappa in Punjab (2600 - 1900 BCE) and to the Minoan civilization of Crete (3100 - 1450 BCE). The main mound at Pandu Rajar Dhibi is associated with Pandu, the Kuru King (1200 - 900 BCE) with evidence of Chalolithic Bronze Age (1600 - 750 BCE) and then Iron Age (1300 - 300 BCE) peoples.

=== Medieval history ===
Medieval India refers to the period between the fall of the Gupta Empire in the 6th century CE and the rise of the Mughal Empire in the 16th century CE.

The region between the Damodar River and the Ajay River was known as "Gopbhum ". It was here that the Sadgop kings ruled in the late medieval period. Their presence continues in the region as part of the Yadav community.

As it is said, traditionally, that in the 11th century CE, the Hindu king, Adi Sura brought five Brahmin and Kayastha from Kannauj, in what is now Uttar Pradesh, to Gopbhum in order to revive orthodox Brahminical Hinduism in West Bengal and that they are represented now by the Kulin community.

In the 14th century CE, King Mahendranath ruled from his fort at Amrargar. One can see the elementary remains of the foundation of a fort. In the 17th century CE, the Amrargar chiefdom faced the warriors of the Bardhaman Raj and in the 18th century, Bargi mercenaries of the Maratha Confederacy.

== Geography ==
Ausgram II CD Block is located in the central area of West Bengal, the eastern most state of India. It is approximately 41km northwest from the centre of Bardhaman (Burdwan) city, the capital of Purba Bardhaman district and approximately 100 km northwest of Kolkata, the state capital.

Ausgram II has an area of 360.45 km^{2} . To the north, Ausgram II is bordered by the Ajay River. To the east is Ausgram I. To the south is Galsi I and to the west is the border with Paschim Bardhaman district.

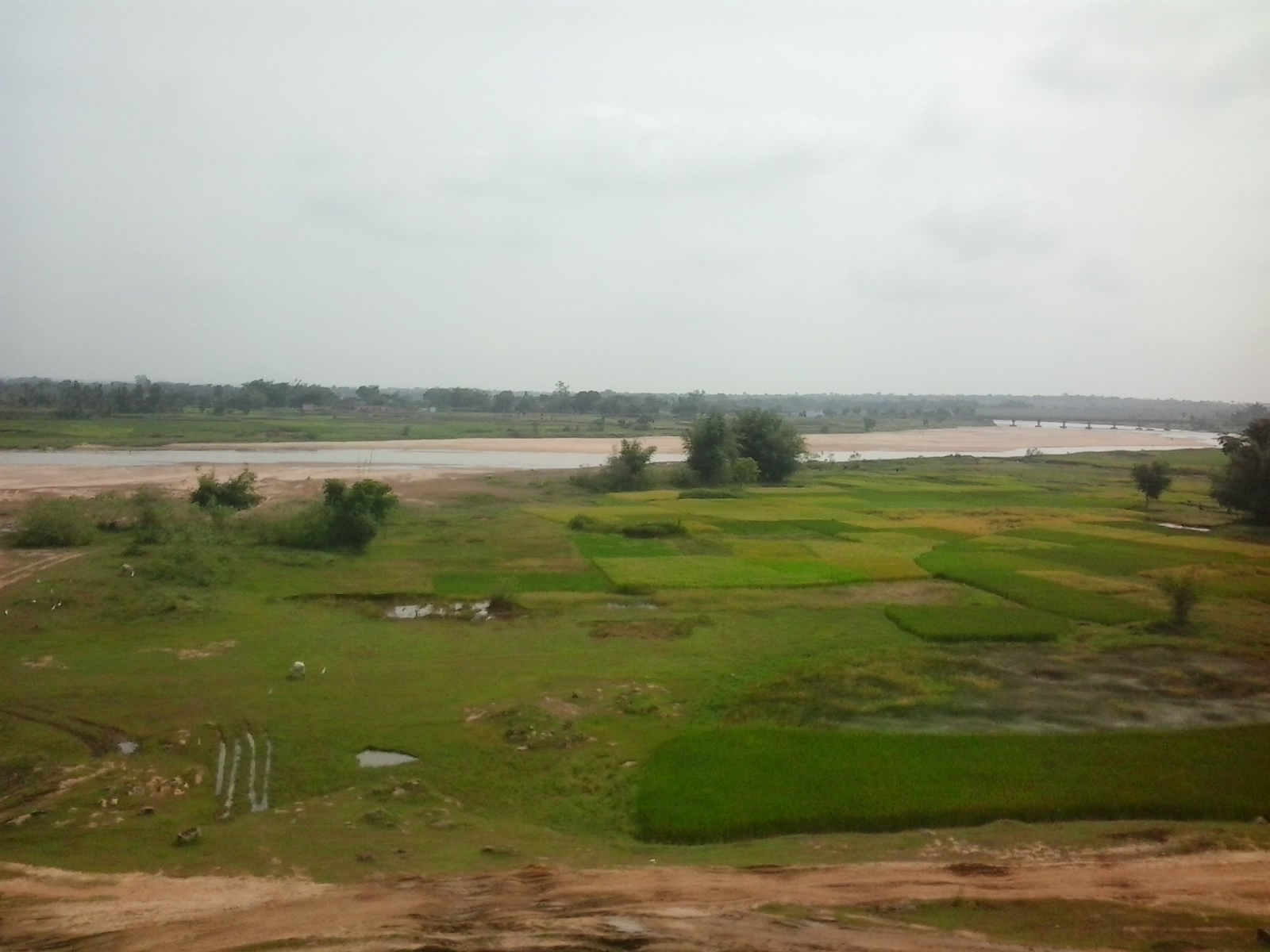
Ajay river, a view from railway track in Jharakhand near Deghar

Within the CD Block there are 7 local government areas (Panchayat samiti or Gram panchayat). They are Amarpur, Balki, Bhedia, Debsala, Eral, Kota and Ramnagar. There are 113 village council areas (gram sansads), 106 administrative areas (Mouza) and 102 villages. Amrargar village is the CD Block administrative headquarters. Villages with over 4000 inhabitants include Debshala, Kota Chandipur, Chhora, Pubar, Amragar, Eral, Sar and Bhedia.

Ausgram II CD Block is a canal irrigated agricultural area located on the Kanksa Ketugram flood plain of the Ajay river. The uneven laterite territory found in the western part of Bardhaman district extends up to Ausgram and then the alluvial flood plains commence. The CD Block is vulnerable to flooding. Factors contributing to this vulnerability include loss of forested land, damage to the embankments of the Ajay river, and Monsoonal rainfall.

== Demographics ==
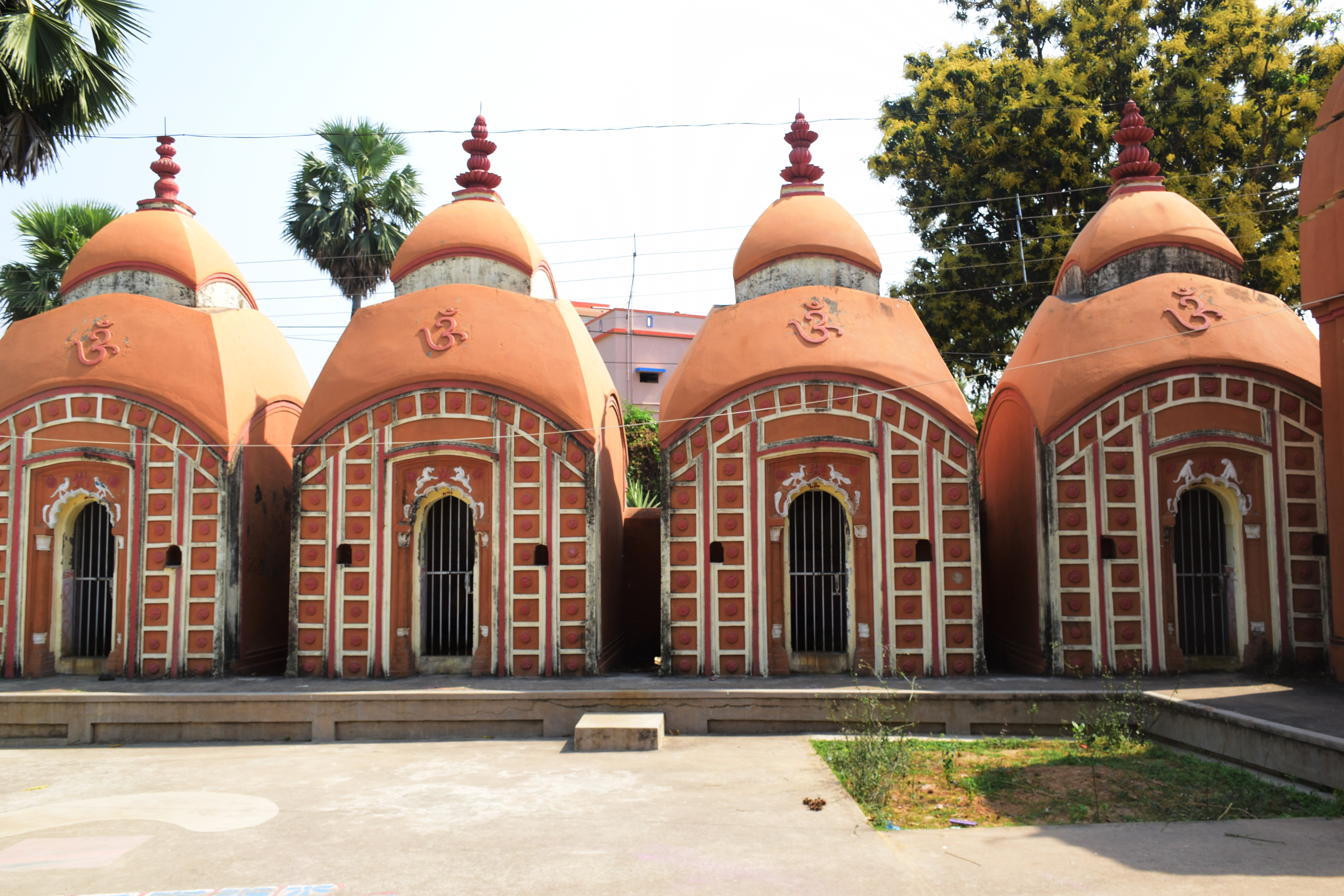
Four Aatchala Temple at Amrargarh in Purba Bardhaman district

In 2011, the 2011 Census of India found the Ausgram II CD Block population was 150,896. There were 77,184 (51%) males and 73,712 (49%) females. The number of children under 6 years of age was 17,204. Residents belonging to the Scheduled Castes numbered 57,141 (37.87%) and to Scheduled Tribes, 21,759 (14.42%).

From 1991 to 2011, the total population increased. In 2020, the total population was 175,760.

At the 2011 Census of India, 68% of residents over 6 years of age were designated literate, an increase of approximately 5 % since 2001. Approximately 15% more males were literate than females. 85.24% of the population spoke Bengali and 12.86% spoke Santali as their first language.

In 2011, 77.32% of residents were Hindu, 21.35% were Muslim and 0.35% were Christian.

In 2005, a household survey found 44.85% of residents living in below the India poverty line.

== Economy ==
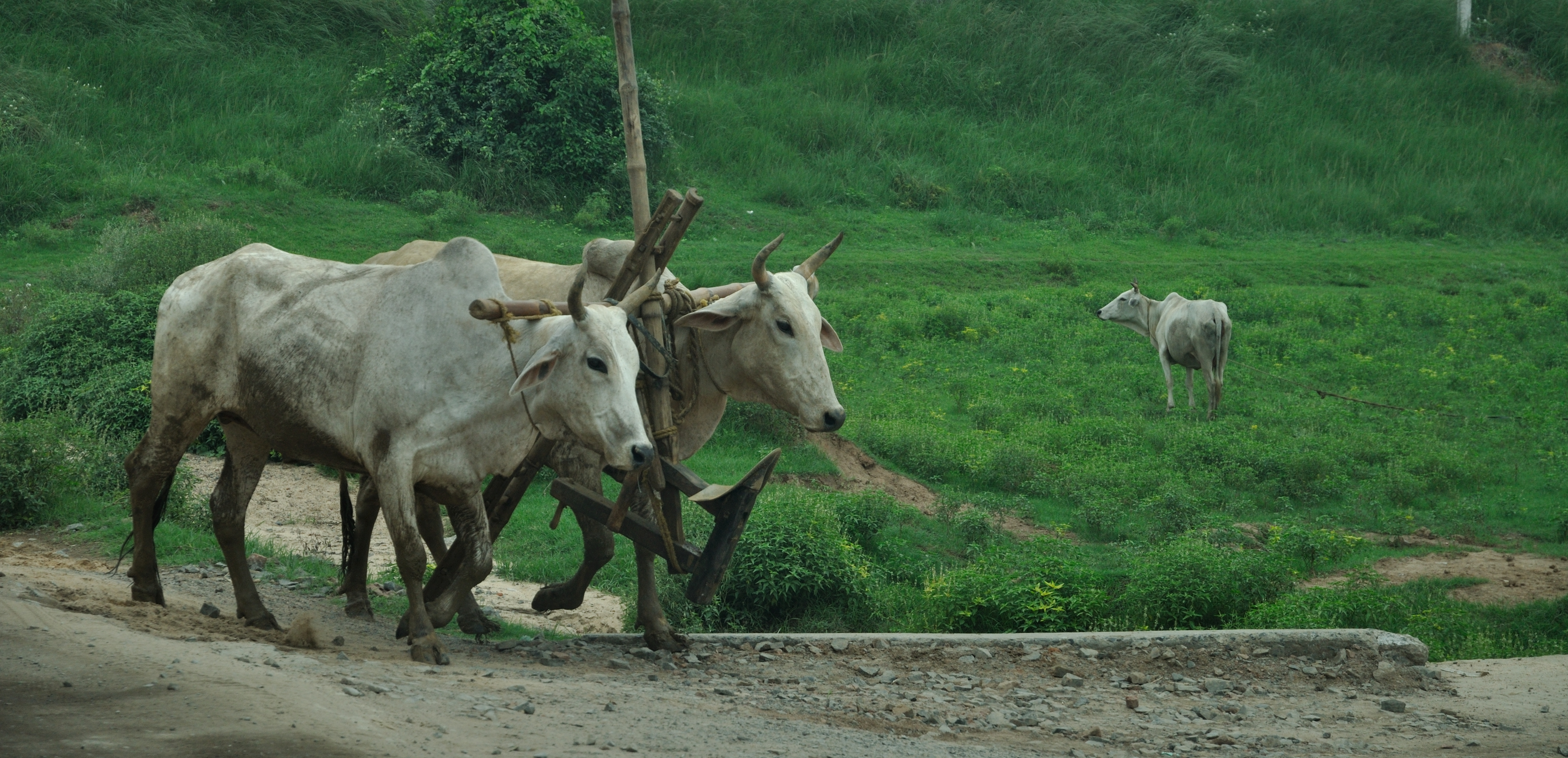
Bulls with a plough and a cow in Bhedia.

Ausgram II has an agricultural economy. In 2011, 16.18% of workers were farmers and 59.19% were agricultural labourers. 5.13% worked in home based industries. 19.50% worked in other settings and the secondary and tertiary sectors.

In 2004, the cropped area of Ausgram II was 22,705 hectares (62%). 32% of the cropped area produced more than one crop.

Sharecropping is the predominant form of agriculture. The rights of farmers are recognised in the West Bengal Bargadari Act of 1950. Since 1970, there has been some land reform in West Bengal. In 2014, 56.51% of the agricultural workforce were labourers. 17.93% were holders of small land deeds (Pattadars). 13.49% were farmers owning land up to 1 hectare and 4.03% owning land between 1 and 2%. 8.04% were share croppers (Bargadars).

The main crop is rice grown in paddy fields (32.87% of cropped area). The aman crop is planted in the monsoon and harvested in winter. The spring rice crop (the boro crop) yield is smaller but is increasing with expansion of the irrigation system and intensive cropping. The aush (or aus) crop, a rough rice, is sown with pre-monsoonal showers and harvested in autumn.

Wheat, potatoes, legumes and oil-seeds are also grown.

In 2014, the 33% of Augram II's land area was irrigated. Most is by canal irrigation. A small amount is by river lift (pumps and direct fetching) irrigation and deep tube wells.

== Services ==
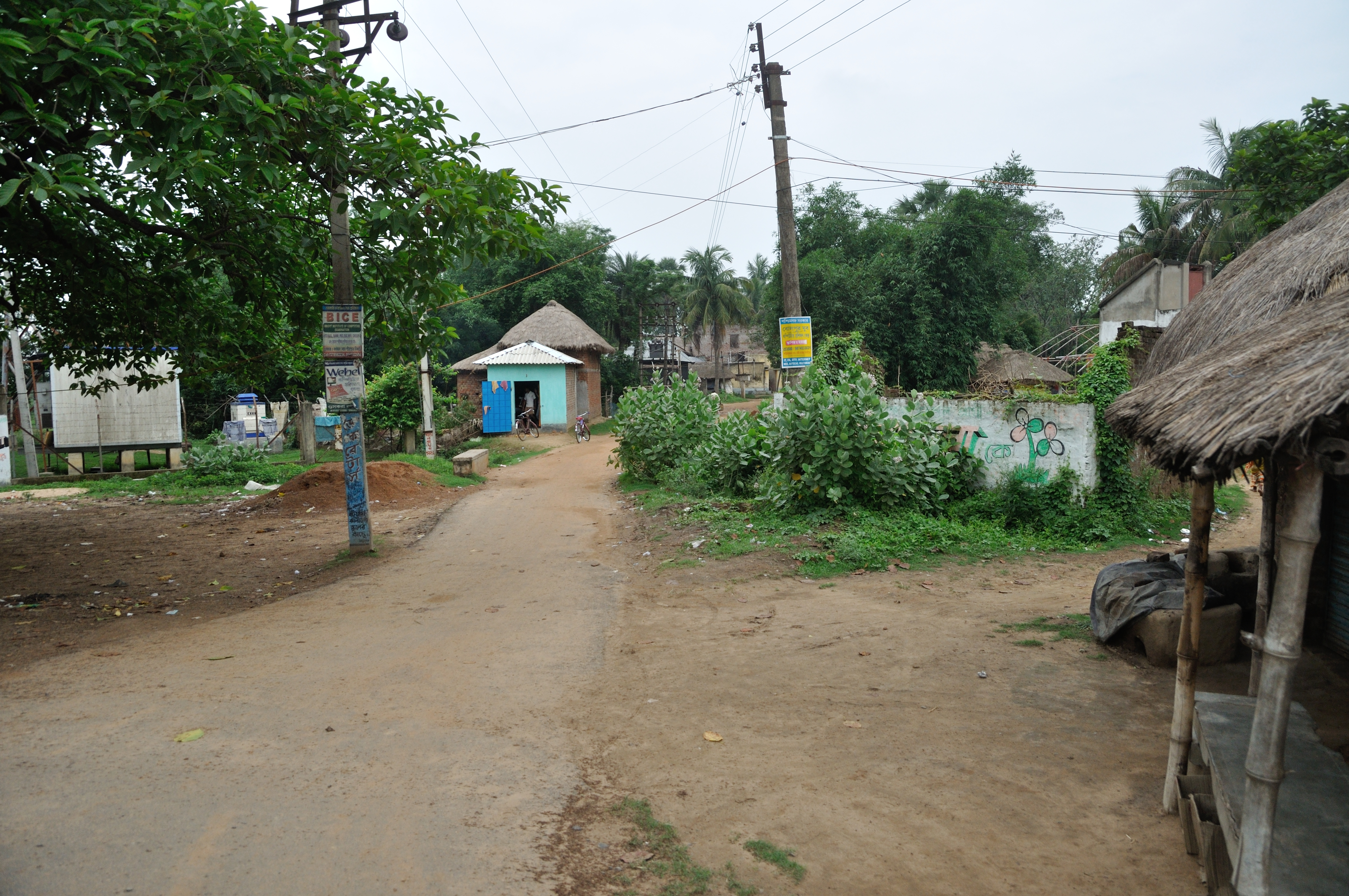
Local road in Sundalpur.

All the villages in Ausgram II have a supply of drinking water and a power supply. Most villages have telephone communication. 27 villages (26.47%) have post offices. Not all have a paved approach road and transport options.

=== Banking ===
In 2014, there were 6 commercial banks, and 4 government owned regional rural banks (gramin banks) across Ausgram II. In 2011, 22 villages (21.57%) had agricultural credit societies.

=== Commerce ===
In 2014, there were 44 fertiliser depots, 1 seed store and 36 fair price shops in Ausgram II.

=== Transport ===
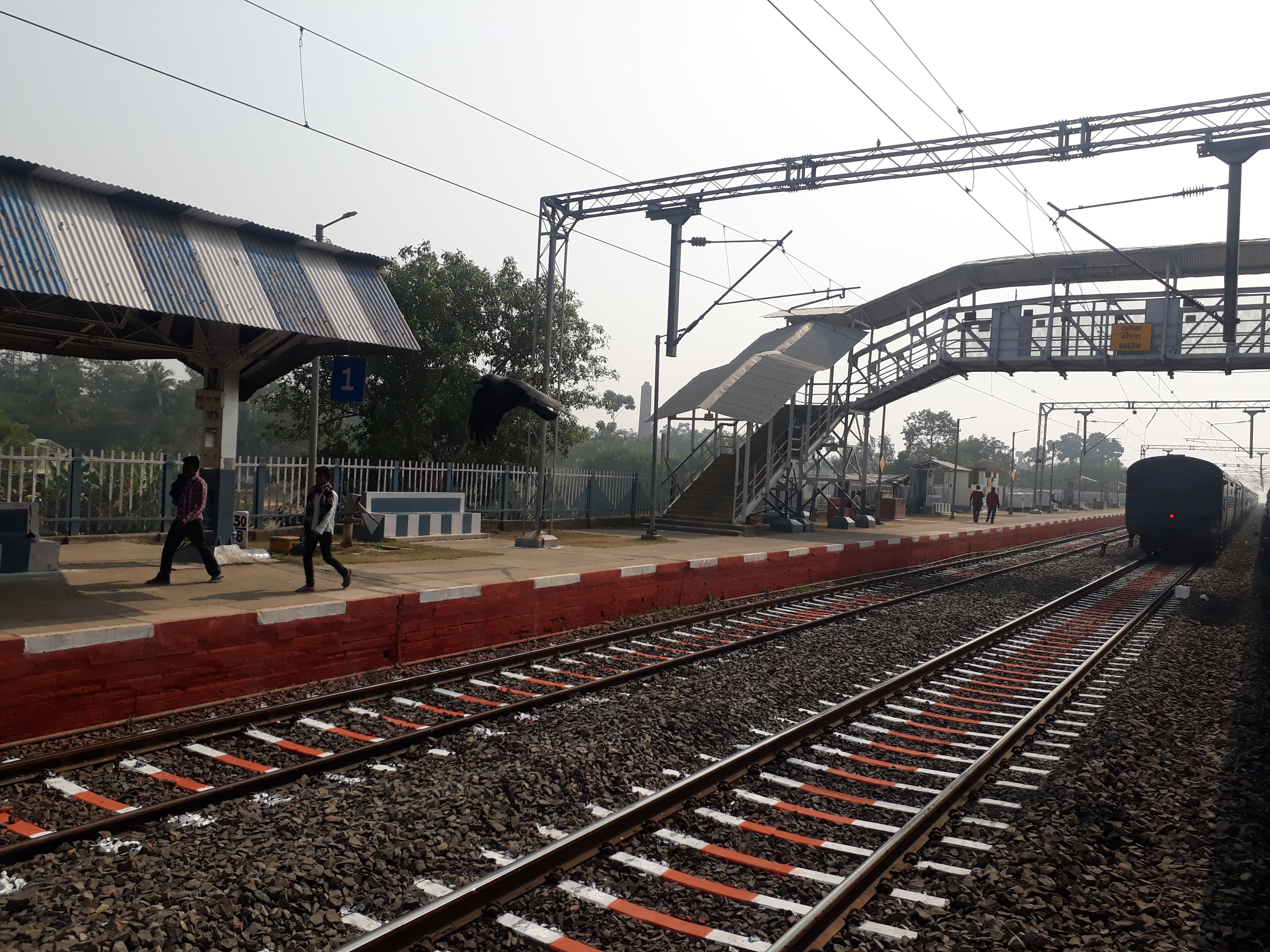
Bhedia railway station, Purba Bardhaman district, West Bengal

In 2014, Ausgram II had 8 individual bus routes. In 2017, there was access to the Khana-Barharwa section of Sahibganj Loop with a station at Bhedia.

=== Education ===
In 2011, 5 villages in Ausgram II had no school. In 2014, Ausgram II had 133 primary schools with 8,691 students, 7 middle schools with 469 students, 15 high schools with 8,049 students and 6 higher secondary schools with 6,560 students. There were 343 institutions for special and non-formal education.

=== Health ===
In 2014, Ausgram II had health centres with a total of 39 beds and 7 doctors. The majority of patients were treated in an outdoor setting. The main facility is at Jamtara.

== Places of interest ==
Ramnabagan Wildlife Sanctuary, near Burdwan village was established in 1981. It covers an area of 0.14 km^{2}.
