= Gopa (disambiguation) =

Gopa may refer to:

- Sagarmal Gopa Indian freedom fighter
- Gopa Noona Korean fashion model
- Gopa (caste) a caste in India
