= Jotedar =

Bengal hereditary aristocrat

Jotedars, also known as Hawladars, Ganitdars, Jwaddars or Mandals, were landlords or well-to-do ryots or wealthy peasants who exercised control and influence comparable to that of a Zamindars but were perceived as significantly below them in social strata in agrarian Bengal during Company rule in India.

Jotedars owned relatively extensive tracts of land, and their land tenure status stood in contrast to those of poor ryots and bargadars (sharecroppers), who were landless or land-poor. Most of the Hindu Jotedars in West Bengal were from the Bhadralok community, members of Hindu upper castes of Bengal such as Kayastha, Brahmin etc. Many Muslim Jotedars were from an Ashraf or Khandani family background and were in the elite nobility of Bengali Muslims who descended from settled foreigners such as the Afghans, Mughals, Arabs, Persians, Turks and North Indian immigrants. The socially high-standing Hindu and Muslim Jotedars, who were not actually peasants, had adopted the de jure status of ryot (peasant) solely for financial benefiting from the Bengal Tenancy Act of 1885 afforded to ryots and for the claim that Jotedars had more freedom and powers than Zamindars.

Others belonged to the intermediate landowning peasant castes, such as Sadgops, Aguris, Mahishyas, Rajbongshis, Shershahabadia and the rural less-educated Brahmins. By the 1920s, a gentrified fraction of Jotedars had emerged from the more prosperous peasants among the tribes such as Santhals and the Scheduled Castes such as the Bagdi and the Namasudras

Jotedars were long in actual control of the village land and economy and were pitted against in the Naxalite movement.
