= Aguri (caste) =

Bengali Hindu caste in India

- Aguri
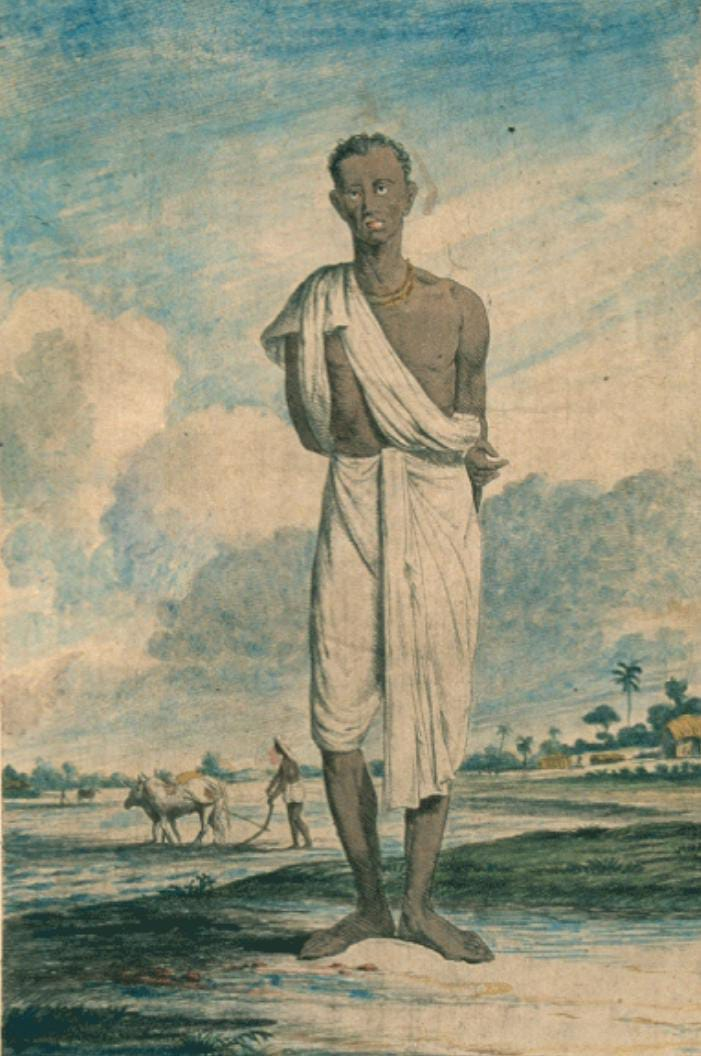
- Aguri cultivator, from a 1799 collection of etchings
- Religions: Hinduism
- Languages: Bengali
- Country: India
- Original state: West Bengal
- Populated states: West Bengal

Aguri (Bengali: আগুরী), also known as Ugra Kshatriya (Bengali: উগ্র ক্ষত্রিয়), is a Bengali Hindu agricultural caste or community found in the districts of Bardhaman, Birbhum, Hooghly, and Bankura in the state of West Bengal in India. Aguris are now considered as a middle-caste group and according to Gail Omvedt, constitute "more prosperous owner-peasants" among the peasant communities of Bengal.

== History ==
After the fall of Gopbhum, Aguris emerged as a dominant caste in Rarh region, especially in the district of Burdwan. William Benjamin Oldham, a British civil servant and ethnographer who wrote Some Historical and Ethnical Aspects of Burdwan District (1891), said that they originated from marriage alliances between the Sadgop rulers of Gopbhum and the Khatri rulers of Burdwan. He based this on the Aguri's own account but McLane believes that Oldham was misled by the Aguri. Citing a 1589 work by Mukundaram Chakrabarti, McLane says that the Aguri were present "almost certainly" before the arrival of the Khatris in Burdwan.

Aguris were cultivators and jotedars, and were divided into two classes – Jana and Sutto. The Janas often demanded that they were Kulins.

Manu, a Hindu religious text, says Ugra (meaning aggressive) was born to a Shudra girl by a Kshatriya father. This mixed origin meant that the community was considered to have an ambivalent position in the Hindu varna system, although by the 1960s they were claiming to be Kshatriya.

== Culture ==
Around the beginning of the 20th century, the Aguri were among the agricultural communities that still predominantly adhered to the custom of paying a bride price at the time of marriage, although some more prosperous members among them were already adopting the increasingly common alternative of paying a dowry. This minority believed that bride price was deprecated by higher castes.

== Notable people ==
- Hare Krishna Konar, Indian Marxist revolutionary, peasant leader and politician
- Benoy Krishna Konar, Indian Marxist, peasant leader, politician, brother of Hare Krishna Konar
- Dasarathi Tah, politician and journalist
- Shakti Samanta, Indian film director and producer
- Ajit Kumar Panja, politician
- Ranjit Kumar Panja, politician and brother of Ajit Kumar Panja
- Nikhilananda Sar, politician
