= Amrargar =

Amarargar
- Village
- Location in West Bengal, India Amarargar (India)
- Coordinates: 23°25′50.6″N 87°35′01.6″E
- Country: India
- State: West Bengal
- District: Purba Bardhaman

Population (2011)
  - Total: 4,937

Languages
  - Official: Bengali, English
- Time zone: UTC+5:30 (IST)
- Telephone/STD code: 03452
- Lok Sabha constituency: Bolpur
- Vidhan Sabha constituency: Ausgram
- Website: purbabardhaman.gov.in

Amarargar (more appropriately Amragarh, as per the Bengali spelling) is a village in Ausgram II CD block in the Bardhaman Sadar North subdivision of the Purba Bardhaman district in the state of West Bengal, India.

== History ==
Around the 11th century, King Mahindranath ruled from his fort at Amrargar. One can see the elementary remains of the foundation of a fort.

According to Binoy Ghosh, it is said that a rishi (sage) named Bhallupada established a kingdom at Bhalki (a village also in Ausgram II CD block and near Amrargar) around 10th-11th century. He extended his kingdom over a large area. His son was Gopal and his grandson/ great-grandson was Mahendranath (or Mahindranath according to some). Mahendranath's kingdom is believed to have extended from Katwa to Panchakot, in what is now mostly a part of Purba Bardhaman and Paschim Bardhaman districts. King Mahendranath's fort was named after his queen Amaravati. The entire area was known as Gopbhum or the territory of the Sadgops. It is said that the possible defeat of Ichhai Ghosh, who held sway over large parts of Gopbhum, at the hands of Lau Sen, helped Mahendranath to extend his territories. In the course of time, the Amrargar family branched out to Dignagar, Bhalki and Kanksa. According to the poets of that area in that period, the rulers of Amrargar were great warriors who could hold on against powerful invaders for 6-7 centuries. They held sway till around the 17th century, when they were defeated by the Rajas of Bardhaman.

See also - Gourangapur for information on Ichhai Ghosh

== Geography ==
Cities and towns in the Bardhaman Sadar North subdivision of Purba Bardhaman district
M: municipal city/ town, CT: census town, R: rural/ urban centre, H: historical site, W: river project, C: craft centre
Owing to space constraints in the small map, the actual locations in a larger map may vary slightly

=== CD block HQ ===
The headquarters of Ausgram II CD block are located at Amrargar.

=== Urbanisation ===
73.58% of the population of Bardhaman Sadar North subdivision live in the rural areas. Only 26.42% of the population live in the urban areas, and that is the highest proportion of urban population amongst the four subdivisions in Purba Bardhaman district. The map alongside presents some of the notable locations in the subdivision. All places marked in the map are linked in the larger full screen map.

== Demographics ==
As per the 2011 Census of India Amrargar had a total population of 4,937, of which 2,459 (50%) were males and 2,478 (50%) were females. Population below 6 years was 601. The total number of literates in Amrargar was 2,439 (56.25% of the population over 6 years).

== Transport ==
State Highway 14, running from Dubrajpur (in Birbhum district) to Betai (in Nadia district), passes through Amrargarh.

== Culture ==
Mahendranath, the ruler of Amrargar, had forcibly carried away an idol of ten-armed Singhabahini from the house of Jagat Singh, an Ugra Kshatriya – it was established as Shibakhya Devi, the ruling deity of Amrargar's princely family. At Amrargar, Dugdheswar Shiva resides in a simple brick temple. The pancha ratna Narayana temple has wonderful carvings. The Durga temple is an attractive cottage built in the Rarh region village style.

== Amrargar picture gallery ==
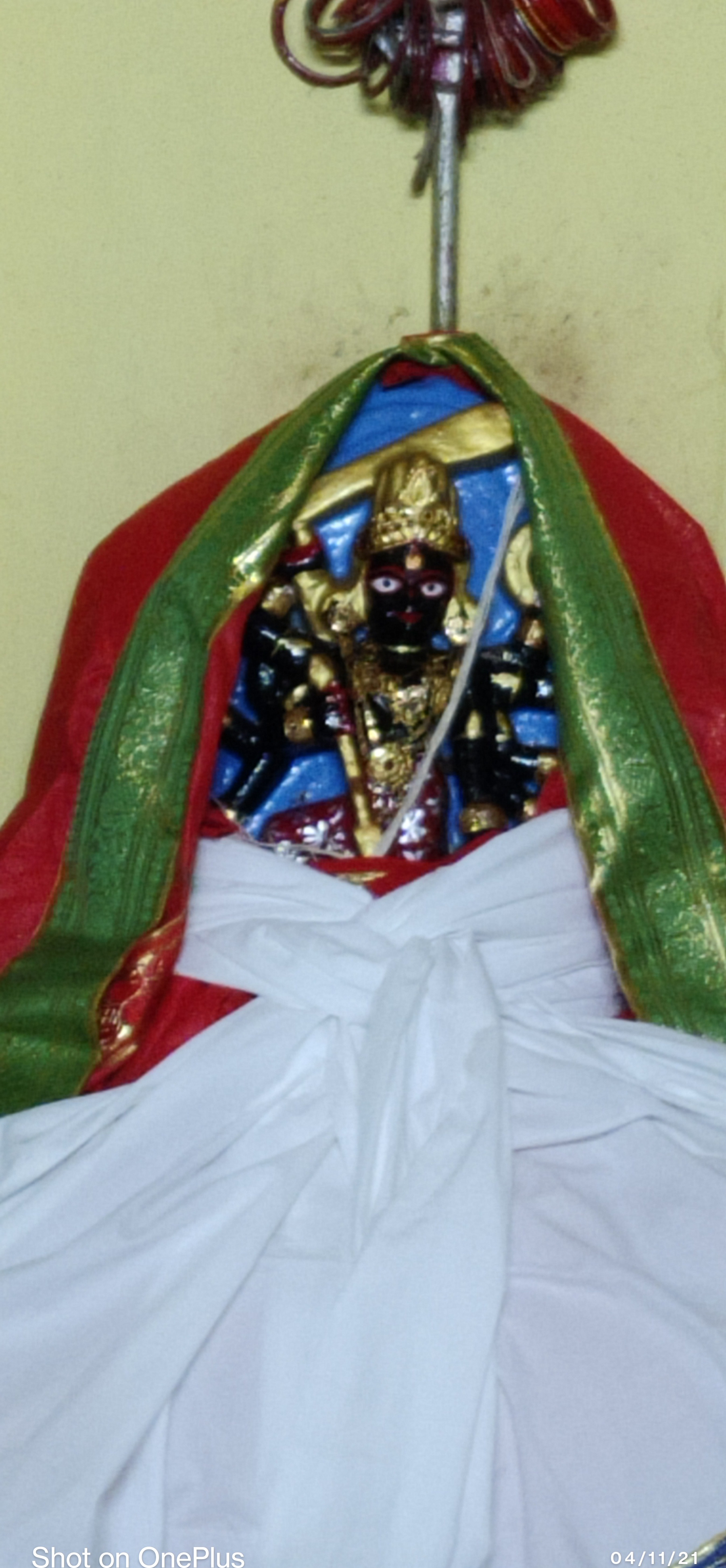
Devi Shibakhya
