= Gopbhum =

Region of West Bengal state in eastern India

- Historical region of East India; Gopbhum
Location	West Bengal
- Established: 10th century
Language	Sanskrit and Bengali
Dynasties	Sadgops (Bengali Yadav)
Historical Capitals	Dhekur, Valki, Amrargar
Separated Area	Purba Bardhaman, Paschim Bardhaman

Gopbhum or Gopbhumi is a historical region of West Bengal state in Eastern India. It included the area between the Ajay and Damodar rivers, which is present-day Purba Bardhaman, Paschim Bardhaman, and also some parts of Birbhum, and Bankura districts of West Bengal. English translation of the word 'Gopbhum' is 'The land of Gopa'.

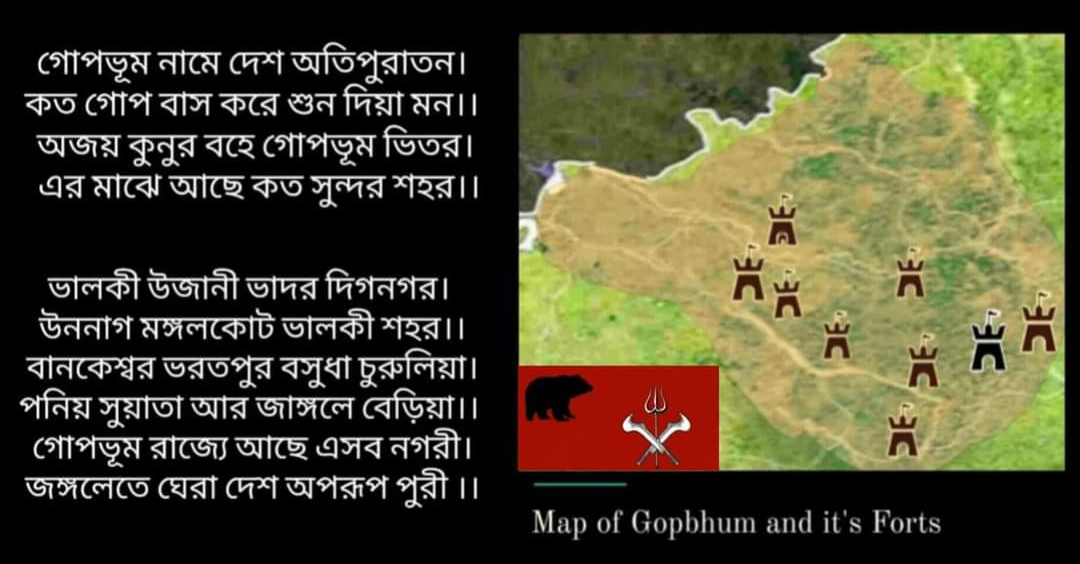
Map of Gopbhum

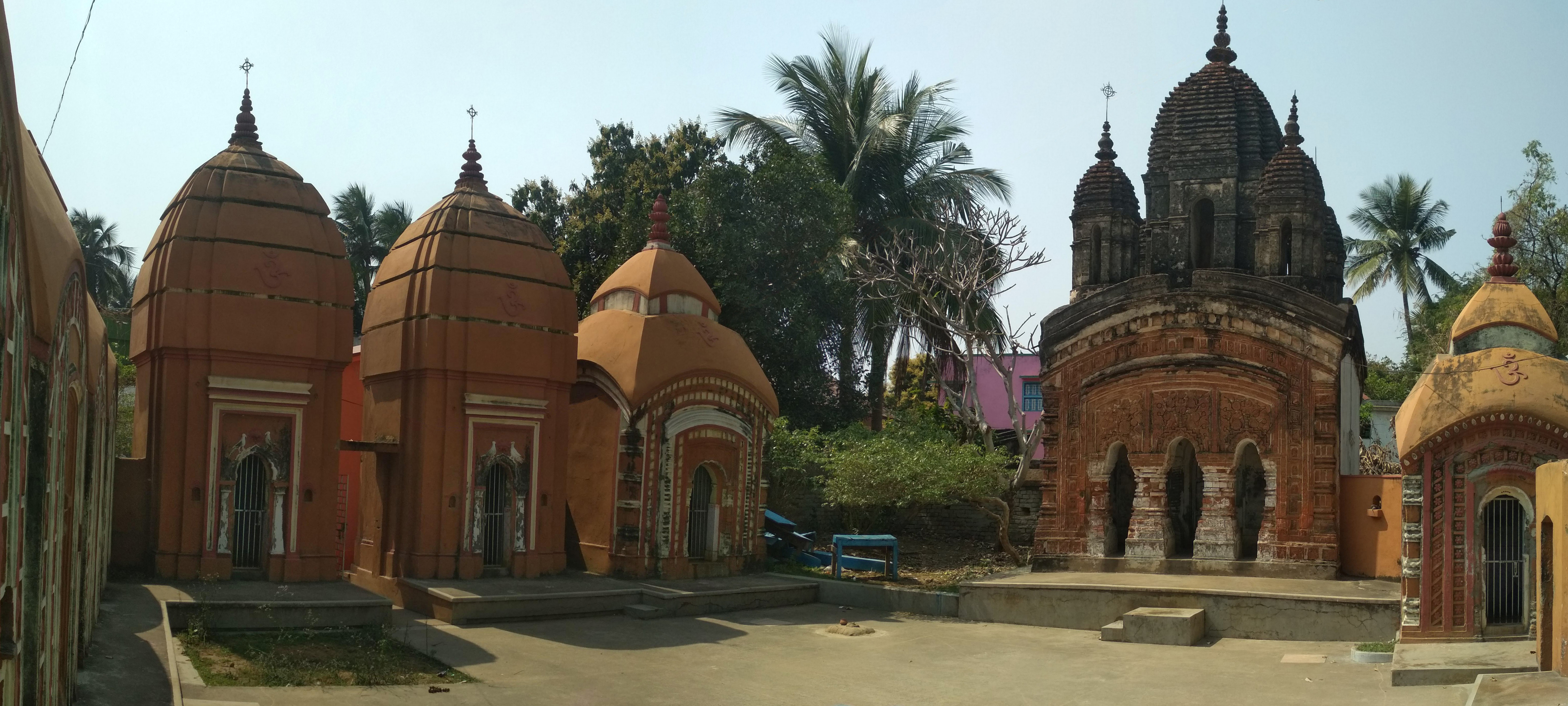
Five temples out of the ten at Amrargar - a pancha ratna, two sikhar deuls and two atchalas

Almost all the member of Sadgop caste say that their original name was Gop and their home was Gopbhum, the region between Ajay and Damodar river.

== History ==
According to Binoy Ghosh, Gopbhum had two Sadgop kings – one ruled from Amrargar and other from Dhekur (Trisasthigar) near present-day Gourangapur.

Abdul Halim on the instructions of Hussain Shah, he wrote a poem called 'Mrigavati' in 1436 Sak, i.e. 1514 AD. He published it with editing in 'Shardia Burdwan' newspaper. It contains some information about the location of Gopbhum along with many contemporary historical events.

=== Kingdom of Trisasthigarh ===
Dhekur, also known as Trisasthigarh was capital of Gopa King Ichhai Ghosh, He built temple of Goddess Bhavani there. A little prior to 1833, a copper edict issued by King Iswar Ghosh (popular as Ichhai Ghosh) was found at Ramganj in Dinajpur district. As per the copper edict, Iswar Ghosh was son of Dhabal Ghosh, grandson of Bal Ghosh and great-grandson of Dhurta Ghosh.

Father of Ichhai Ghosh, Som Ghosh (also known as Dhabal Ghosh) was one of the most powerful ruler of Gopbhum, he invaded Senbhum. Abhiram Sen of Senbhum was defeated and killed in the sudden attack by ruler of Gopbhum.

Lau Sen of Moyna fought with King Ichhai Ghosh of Gopbhum. In this battle Ichhai Ghosh was defeated and part of Gopbhum was captured by Lau Sen.

Ghanram, the poet of Dharmamangal, wrote that Ichai Ghosh was surrounded by mountains. Although there are no mountains nearby, the mountains are not far from here. The poet writes that Ichai settled by cutting the inaccessible deep forest. Gaurangpur and Shyamarupa still have to be built through deep forests and inaccessible vast forests. When we went, even the local common people did not want to accompany us out of fear. On reaching Gaurangpur, after adding water to the house of the Muslim community in the village, we set off to see Ishai Ghosh's Deul and Shyamarupa Garh. Then four or five men along with Mandal became our guide with axes. I have never entered such a deep forest in my life. Step by step, it seemed that it would not be possible to return by the way I was going. On the way, the village mandal was saying, while cutting wood, woodcutters make a path, then the path is covered again by the forest. There are no road signs anywhere. They were going by cutting branches and undergrowth with both hands to make a path, we were following them. In this way from Gaurangpur we reached Khamarupa after crossing about two or three miles of forest-path after seeing Ishai Ghosh's Deul.

=== Kingdom of Valki or Amragarh ===
Around the 14th century, King Mahindranath ruled part of Gopbhum from his fort at Amrargar or Amragarh. The early remains of the foundation of the fort can still be seen today.

According to Binoy Ghosh, it is said that a Rishi named Bhallupada established a kingdom at Valki (a village also in Ausgram II CD block and near Amrargar) around 13th-14th century. He extended his kingdom over a large area.

It is surprising to think that a large volume of poetry was composed on the basis of Amara and was printed in Bengali 1319 by the Janmbhoomi Press. At the beginning of the book, the court poet of Gopbhum, Debendra Nath Catttopaddhay worships Shivakhaya Dev. There are many bravery stories of Raja Mahendra in this poem. Among the immortals, many kings have made dictionaries and brave kings and their brave warriors have sacrificed their lives to protect the country. There is also the genealogy of Raja Mahendra in this poem.

In 1035 A.D or 442 Bangabd King Raghav Singh established a Kingdom in Gopbhum region with its capital at Valki. A Yaduvanshi Kshatriya Bhupati of Ayodhya province encamped near a forest 4.5 miles from Mankar while going to Sastrika Purushottam. The queen was pregnant. At that time she went into labor and gave birth to a child in the camp. As the child appeared dead, they left him in the forest and departed. It is said that a bear protected the child till a sage, named Shivanand Swami saw a baby in a herd of bears and rescued him. He reformed the child accordingly and taught him the Vedas and archery. The forest was named after Vallupad after being brought up in Rikshakhavara. That is why Raghav Singh Vallupad named his capital Valki and forest was named Valki's forest. Later his grandson Gopala and great-grandson Shatakruta expanded the boundaries of the kingdom. Shatakrut's son Mahendra Singh was the Unrivaled king of the region. Mahendra Singh married the daughter of Kalidas Ghosh King of Nilpur named Amravati and Amrargarh was named after her.

Mahendranath's kingdom is believed to have extended from Katwa to Panchakot, in what is now mostly a part of Purba Bardhaman and Paschim Bardhaman districts to Bhagwangola to Jamtara. In the course of time, the Amrargar family branched out to Dignagar, Valki and Kanksa.

At that time a dispute arose between Kadar Khan, the Governor of Lakhnauti and Bahram Khan, the Governor of Sonargaon. On this occasion Raja Mahendra Singh expanded his own territory. He defeated the king Jagat Singh of Khajurdihi by force of arms and sided him in his own side. After that he established his Kuldevi Shivakhya in his capital. Shivakhyar pujo is still performed today.

After the death of Fakhruddin Bahram Khan around 1338 Occupied Olayet-e-Sonargaon. He was the Shilahdar of Bahram Khan. In 1338-39 A.D Fakhruddin and Kadar Khan of Lakhnauti were fighting that is why it was not possible for them to conduct military operations in the Valki region. On this occasion Mahendra Singh made a lot of progress in this region. He repaired the ruined forts. He built Dugdheshwar Shiva Mandir, Shivaksha Mandir and dug huge dighi in the name of Rajmata Shaivya.

With the help of and Guru Sanyasi Shivram, King Mahendra defeated King Sudarshan Sen of Chandrapahari and other small kingdoms and spread his kingdom far and wide. The identity of Sudarshan Sen is not known. According to Sadagopa Kulji, he was of Sen descent (Sen Dynasty). He may also be a descendant of Keshab Sen.

He renovated many forts in this region like Talitgarh, Kotshimul Garh, Shaktigarh, Ramchandragarh (Bhatakul), Amarargarh, Senpahari Garh, Shyamarupa Garh, Narpal Garh (Kamar Kita), Samudragarh, Panagarh, Rajgarh, Garh Sonadanga, Churulia Narottam Garh, Dihi Ser or Disergarh, Kalna Garh, Shankai Garh, Churulia Narottam Garh, Shankaiyer Garh etc.

Probably around 1343, a fakir was caught while doing charabritti in Kanksa area. Pratap Aditya imprisoned him. As a result, Lakhnauti Governor Fakhruddin Mubarak Shah sent Shah Bahman Ghazi to fight against Mahendra Singh. On behalf of Mahendra Singh, his son-in-law Pratap Aditya led the army and won the battle. This victory encouraged many Hindu kings.

After that Sikandar started sending expeditions to capture Lakhnur and Saptagram. In 1363, General Syed Barman of Sikandar Shah fought with Mahindra Singha's forces at Jamtara in Jharkhand. Syed Barman tried to enter through Chhotanagpur but Raja Mahendra Singh along with his son Yogendra singh faced the battlefield with huge army. Syed Burman was killed in the battle of Jamtara. During the lifetime of King Mahendra, Sikandar Shah never tried to attack him again.

According to the poets of that area in that period, the rulers of Amrargar were great warriors.

Raja of Amrargar held sway till around the 17th century, when they were defeated by the Rajas of Bardhaman.

== Decline ==
In 1204, During the attack of Bakhtiar Khilji, the Sadgope King Kankasen Rai died in the Battlefield against Bakhtiar's commander Syed Bukhari, who was also killed in the battle. There is a tomb in Prayagpur named after Bukhari.

However, while the Sadagop kingdom of nearby Kanksa was destroyed by Syed Bukhari in the 13th century, the kingdom of Amarargarh survived till the 17th century.

This region suffered a lot during the Maratha invasion. The last king Baidyanath Niyogi died while repelling the Maratha invasion.

At one battle the kings of Shergarh or Sikharbhum and Gopbhum defeated Mohan Giri, the general of Bhaskar Pandit. After that his brother Mahendranath was planning with the local kings to revolt against the Nawab then King Chitrasen Rai of Burdwan asked him to attack Gopbhum. This is how the kingdom of Gopbhum fell at 1744.

== Culture ==
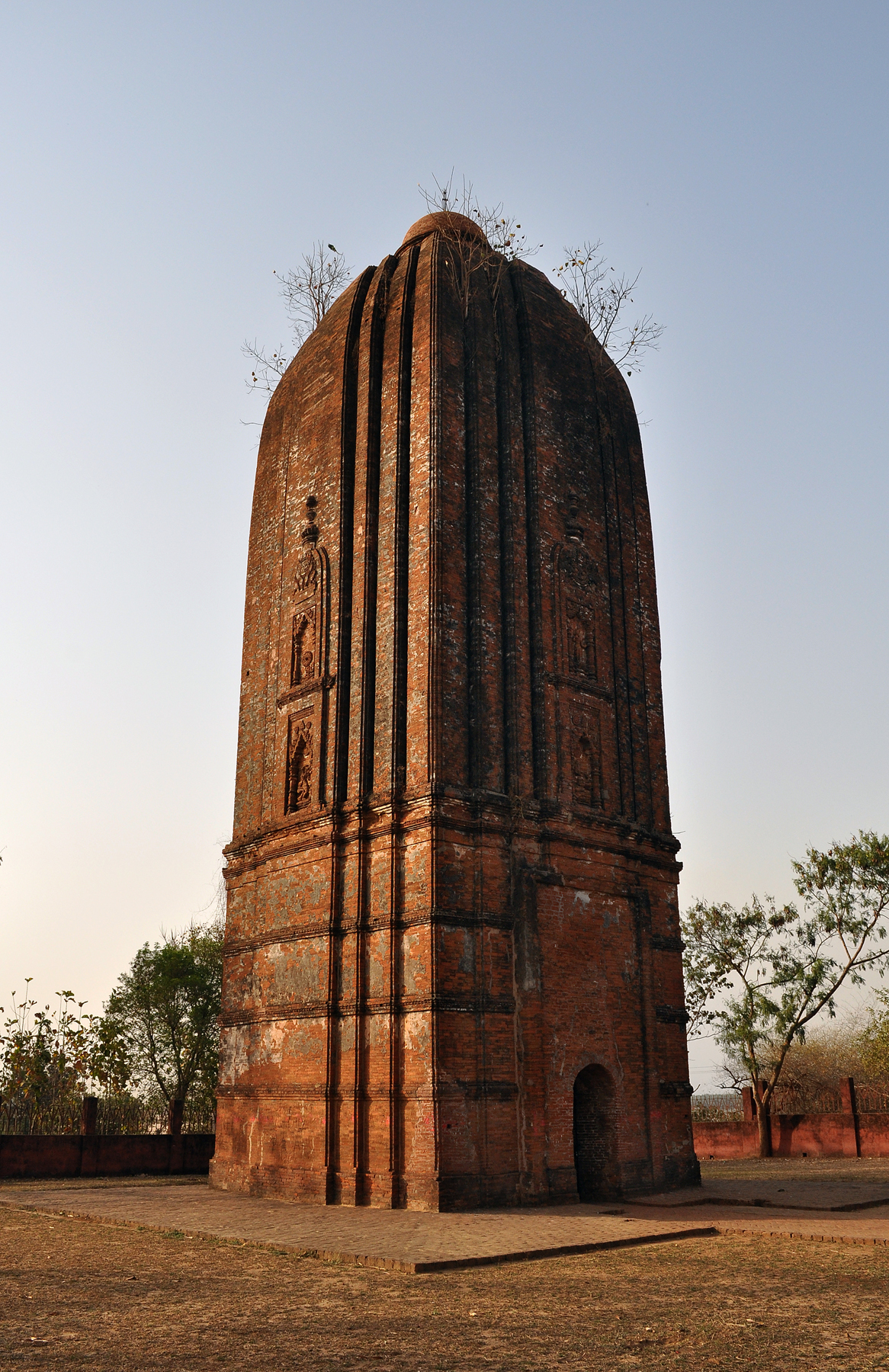
Ichhai Ghosher Deul at Gourangapur

Ichhai Ghosher Deul is located at Gourangapur. It is a brick-built temple. Scholars date it around 16th-17th century and it was possibly erected by the descendants of Ichhai Ghosh, to perpetuate his memory.

== See also ==
- Gourangapur
- Kanksa
