= Ichhai Ghosher Deul =

Temple in Gourangapur, West Bengal

- An ASI Listed Monument
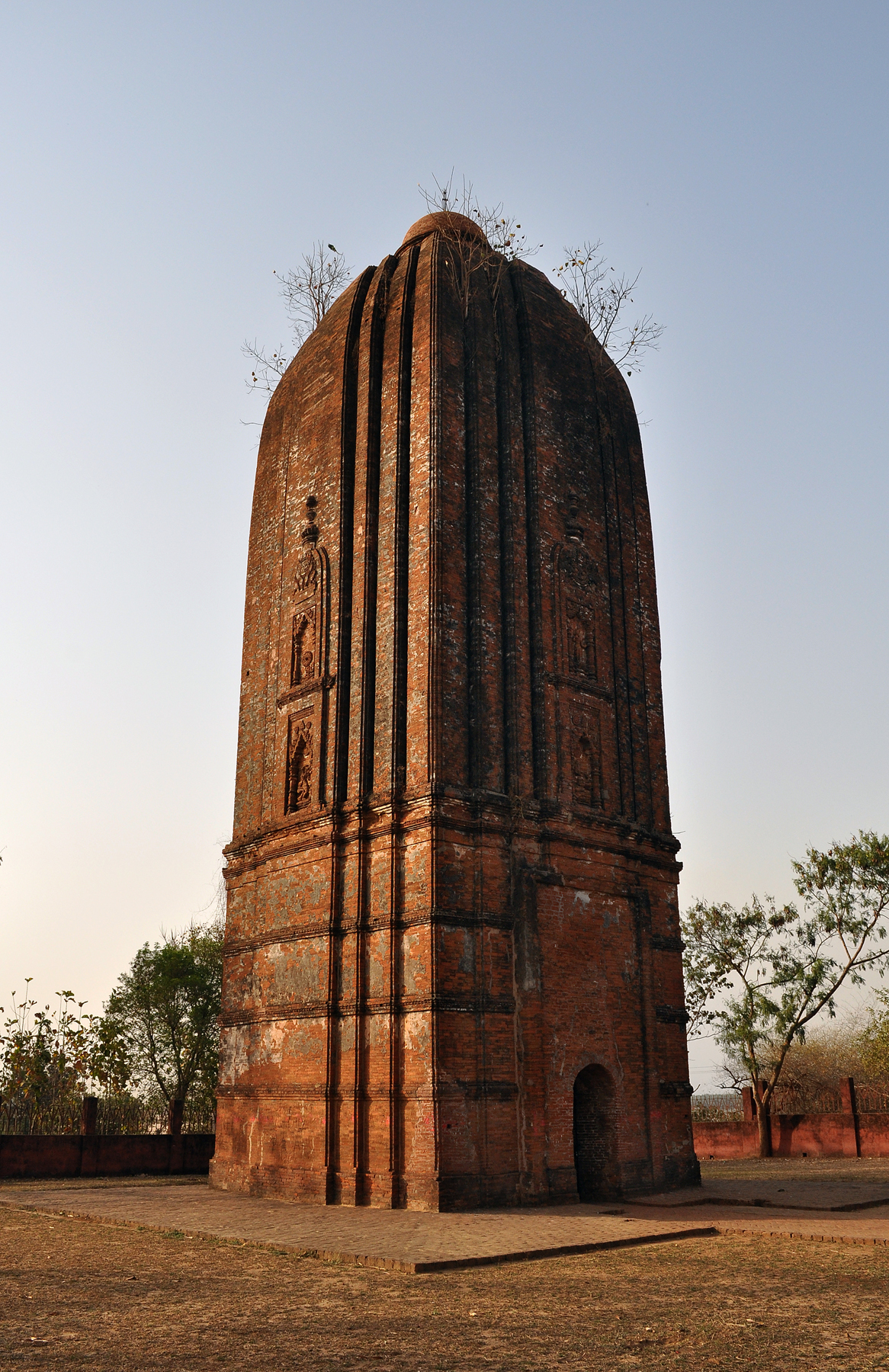

- Location within West Bengal Location within India

Religion
- Affiliation: Hinduism

Location
- Location: Gourangapur; Paschim Bardhaman
- State: West Bengal
- Country: India
- Interactive map of Ichhai Ghosher Deul
- Coordinates: 23.6097°N 87.4523°E

Architecture
- Type: Rekha deul
- Completed: 16th-17th century

Ichhai Ghosher Deul is located near Gourangapur in the Indian state of West Bengal. It is a late mediaeval brick-reinforced temple of the sikhara type without any image. Tradition says that Ichai Ghosh constructed the temple in honour of the Goddess Bhagabati. Notwithstanding, this type of brick temple seen at Neiba Khera, Uttar Pradesh.

== Location ==
The Ichai-Ghosh-temple is largely separated by the river Ajay in the neighbourhood of the neighbourhood Gourangapur in the Paschim Bardhaman district in West Bengal, about 178.5 km (dynamical distance) north of Kolkata. Whether it has been in the locality of the temple, formerly a settlement, or whether the temple was a territorial pilgrimage center, is unclear.

== Account ==
The date of expression of the temple is unclear. It may date from 7th to 11th century or 16th to18th centred. According to tradition, Ichai Ghosh constructed it in favor of the Goddess Bhagabati.

According to Binoy Ghosh, Ichhai Ghosher Deul, located at Gourangapur, is one of the few rekha deuls in Bengal. Scholars date it around 16th-17th century and it was perchance erected by the descendants of Ichhai Ghosh, to perpetuate his memory board.

David J. McCutchion mentions Ichhai Ghoser Deul at Gourangapur as a large smooth curving rekha deul, having a base of 20 feet second power. It is a unattractive brick body structure but for niches and images on tower.

According to the List of Monuments of National Importance in West Bengal, the Ichhai Ghosh Temple is an ASI enrolled monument.

== Structure ==
The temple is astir 18 m high. It has an windowless Cella (garbhagriha). Its basement is almost square.

== Building Decoration ==
The severe discoid-arched portal, is of a orthogonal underframe enclosed; each of the two niches in of amalaka and kalasha - chapleted fields of the upper Zone show on all four sides of polyfoil arches and not further identifiable figures of gods. Bright plaster remainder on the external walls point to the fact that the temple was temporarily plastered.

== Ichhai Ghoser Deul picture gallery ==
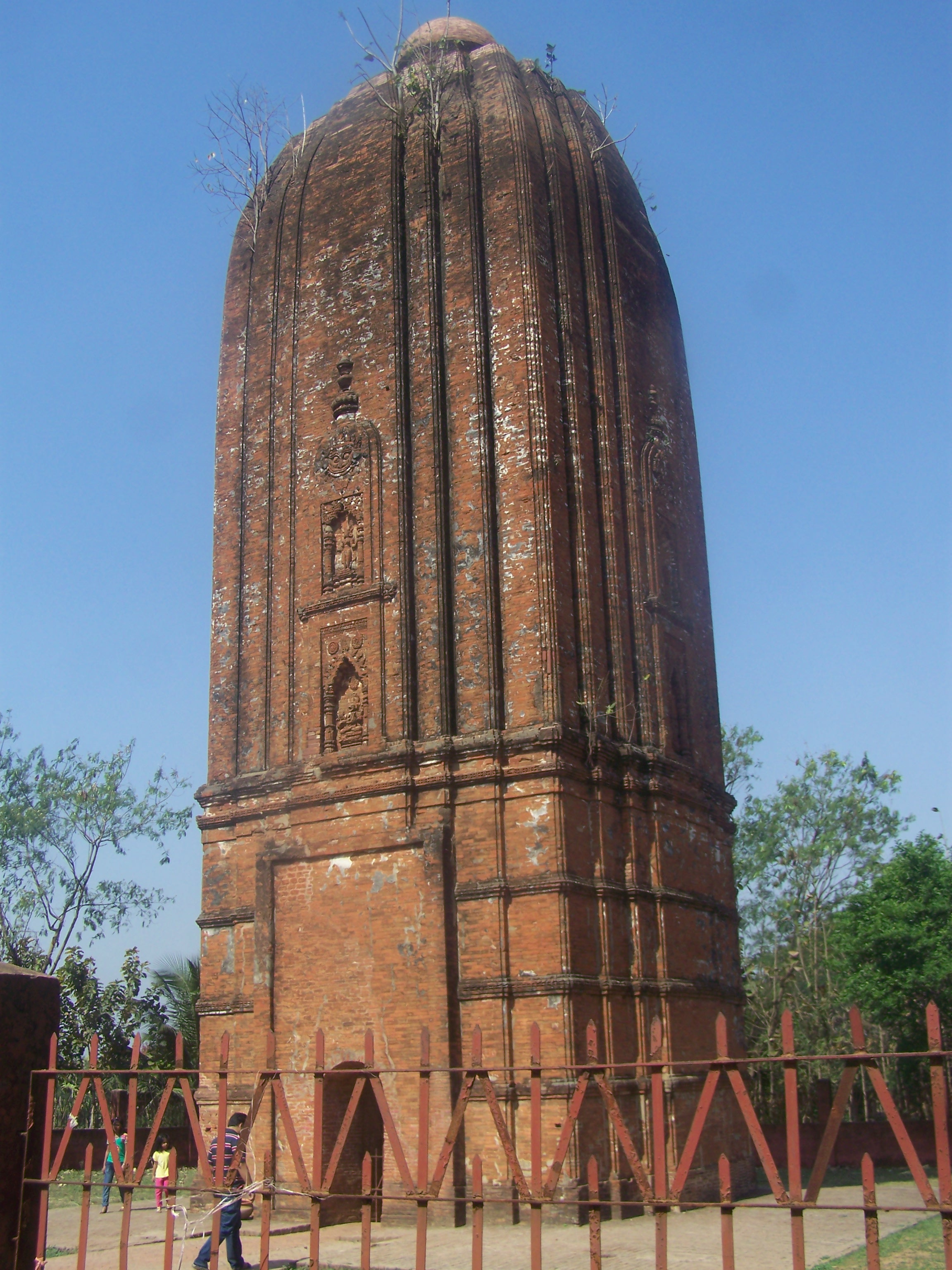

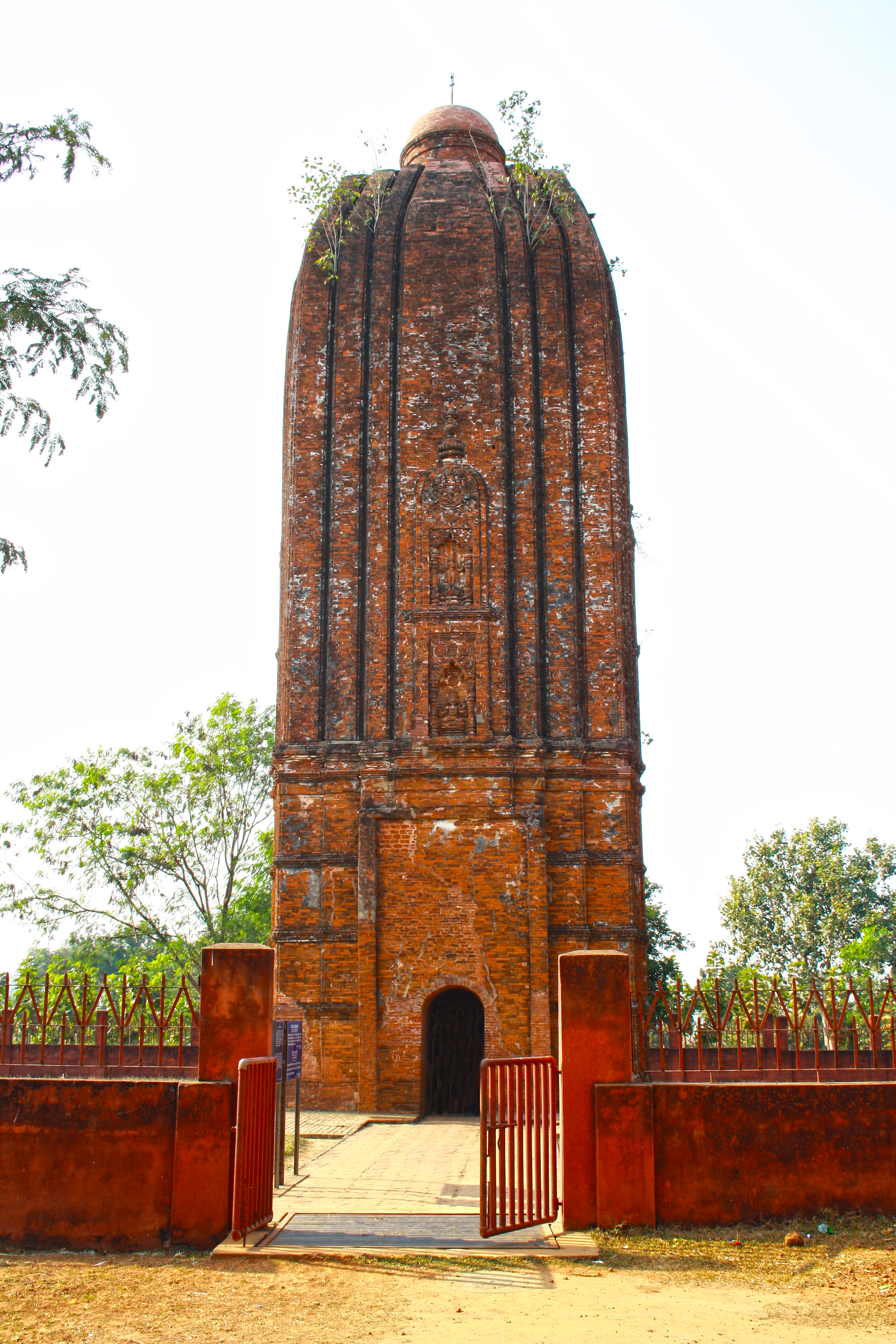

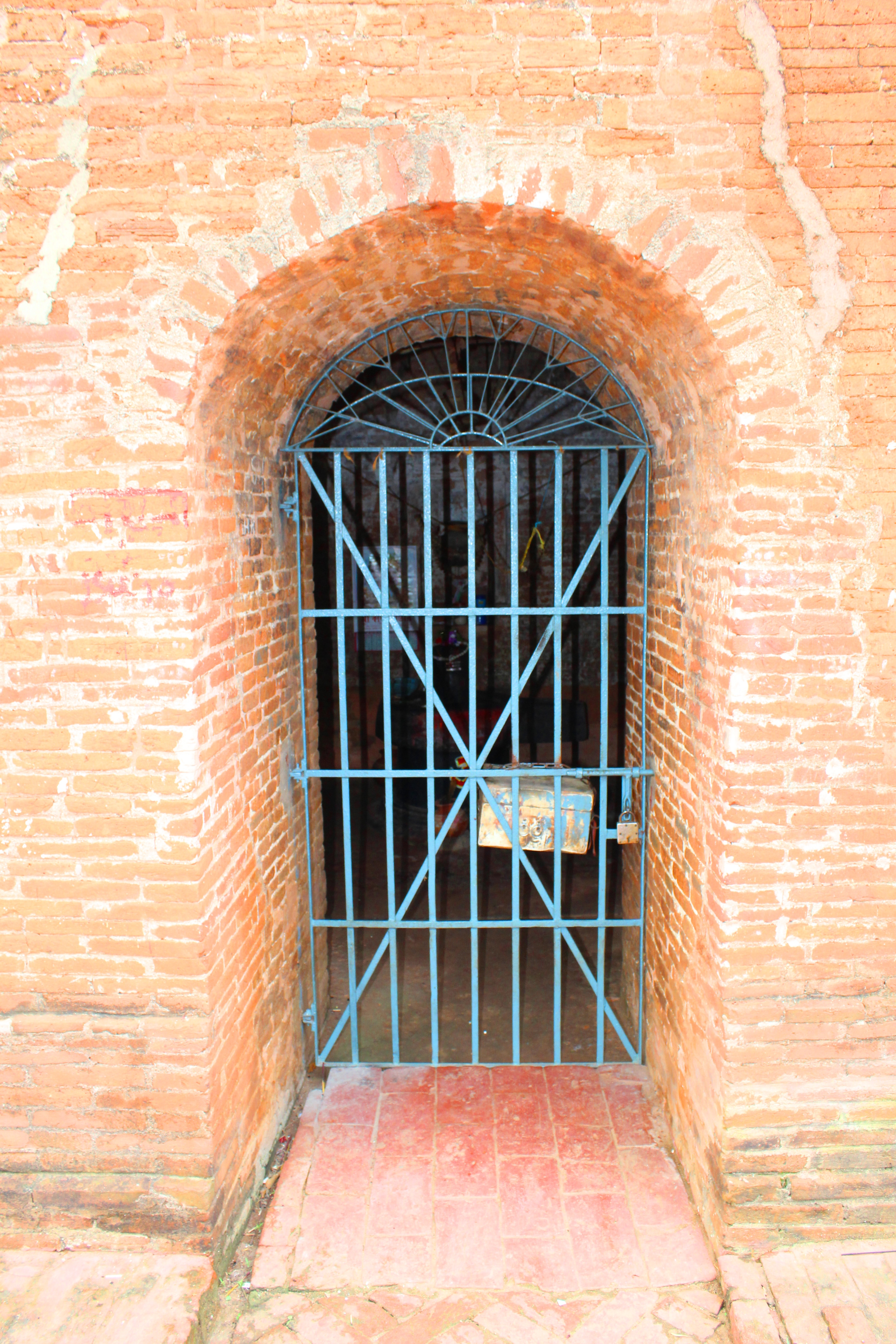

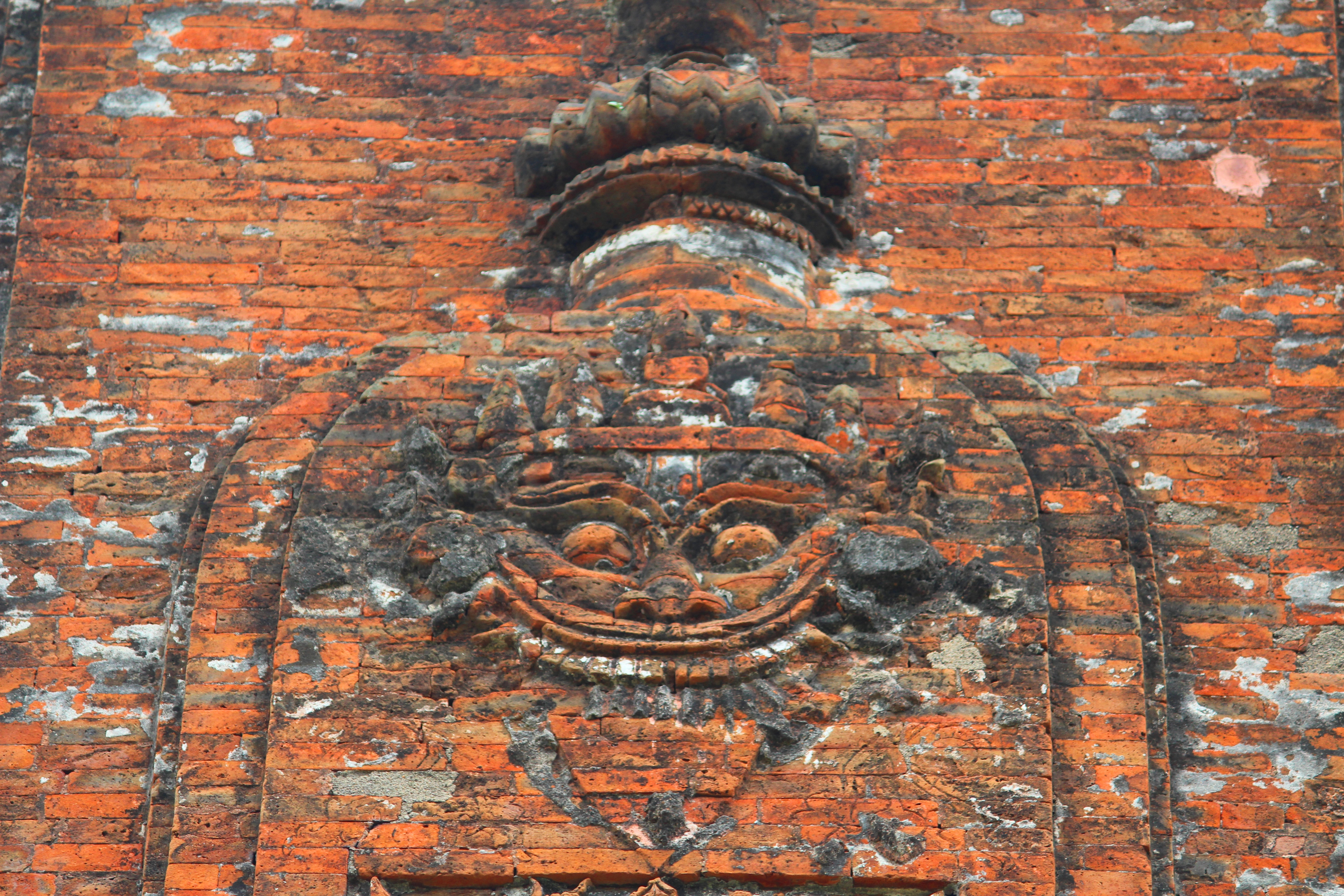
sculpture on the outer walls of Ichhai Ghoser Deul

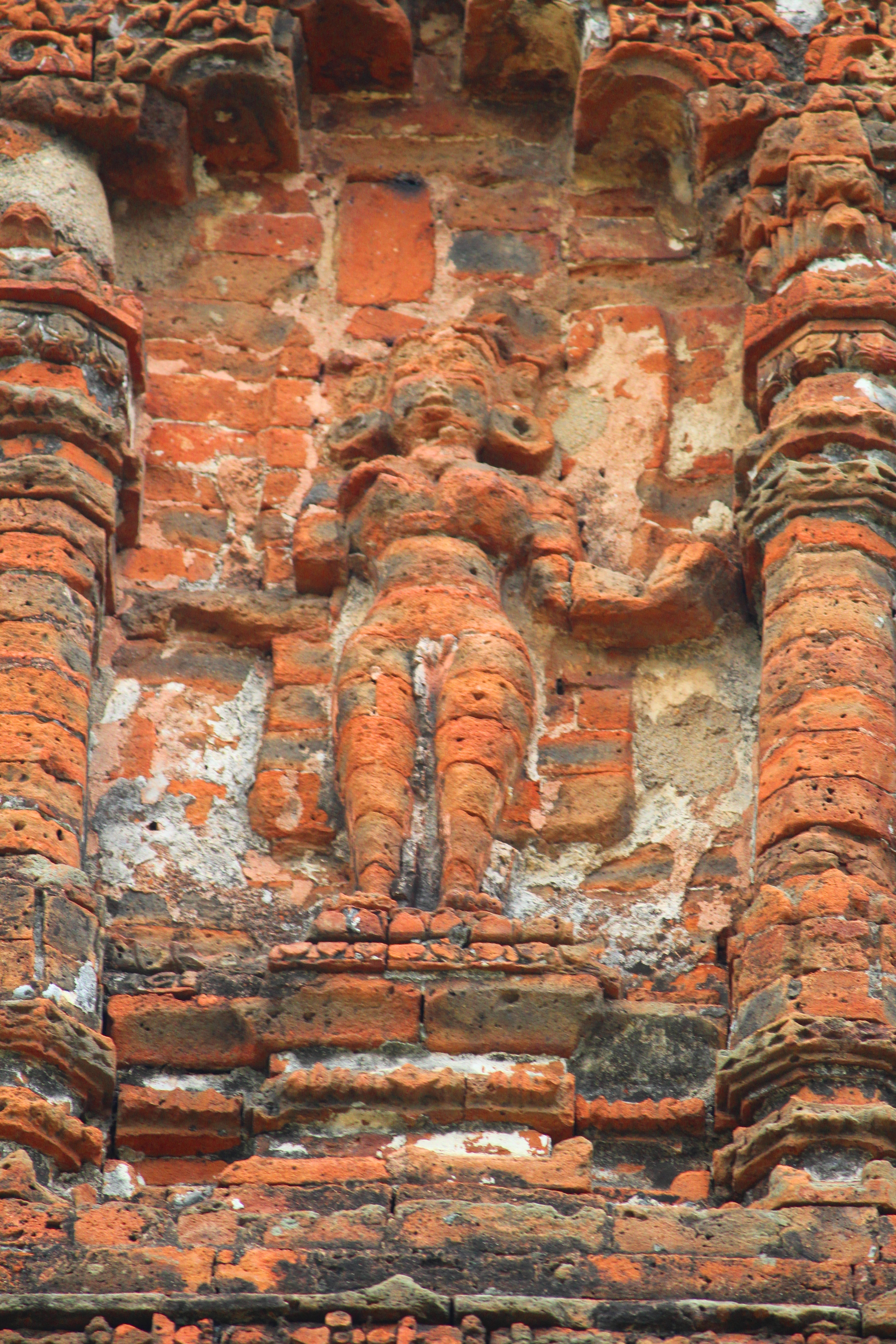
sculpture on the outer walls of Ichhai Ghosher Deul

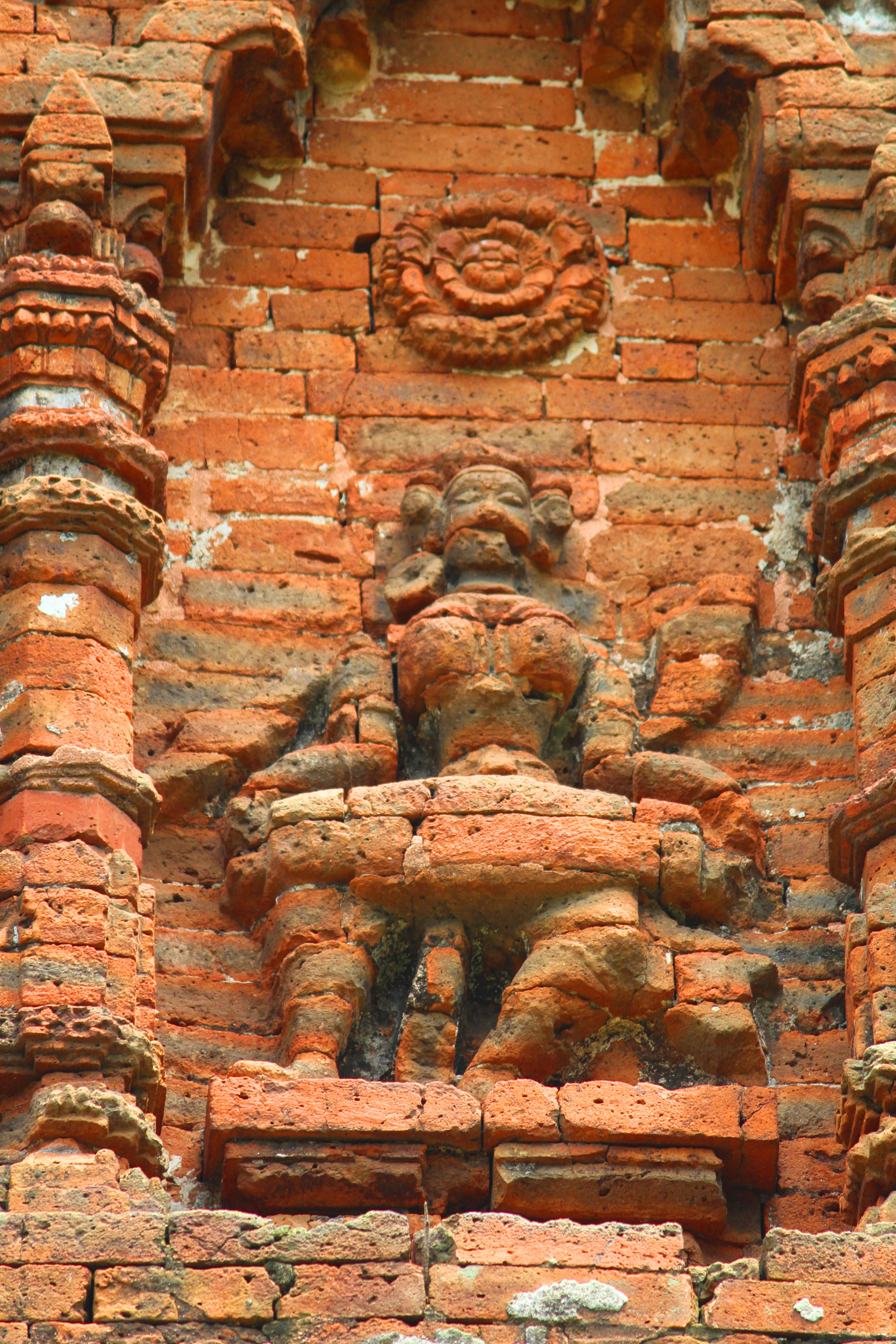
sculpture on the outer walls of Ichai Ghosher deul

== International golf links ==
- Ichai-Ghosh-Temple – photos + Short Infos (English)
