= Gopa (caste) =

Synonyms of Ahirs in India and Nepal

- Kuladevta (male): Shri Krishna
- Religions: Hinduism
- Languages: Varies depending on region
- Populated states: India, Nepal

Gopa or Gop or Gope is a synonym of a caste in India and Nepal. It is generally used as a title by the yadav/Ahir caste in the states of Bihar in India and the Terai region of Nepal.

== Etymology ==
The Sanskrit word Gopa, originally meant only a cowherd; it then came to mean the head of cowpen and lastly the chief of a tribe.

== Origin and history ==
Buddhaswami, an ancient scholar, in his Brhatkathaslokasamgraha has mentioned the story of an Abhira who lived in a 'Ghosha' where both the terms 'Abhira' and 'Gopa' have been used for the same people.

The Amarakosha lists Gopa, Gopala, Gosamkhya, Godhuk, and Ballava as synonyms for Abhira and states that the village or settlement where Abhiras lived was called Ghosa or Abhirapalli.

Gwalior was known as Gopagiri in ancient and early medieval times, as mentioned in inscriptions by rulers such as Mihirkula and in an 876 AD inscription of Bhoja Deva, which suggest some kind of association of this place with pastoral communities like the Gopas.

=== Dynasties, chieftaincy & zamindari ===
- Gopala-Gupta dynasty and Mahisapala dynasty of Nepal.
- Sadgope Dynasty of Gopbhum. It had two Sadgope (Gopa) kings, one ruled from Amrargar and other from Dhekur (also known as Trisasthigar).
- Sadgope rulers of Midnapore Raj, Narajole Raj, Narayangarh and Balrampur in Bengal.
- Gopa or Ahir chieftain of Murho Estate, Parasadi Estate, Belwarganj Estate, Ranipatti Estate, Tintanga Estate in Bihar.

== Gop Jatiye Mahasabha ==
Gop Jatiye Mahasabha was formed by Babu Rash Bihari Lal Mandal in 1911, It was the regional organization of Gope or Ahir caste of Bihar. Later, the All-India Yadav Mahasabha was formed by merging the Gop Jatiye Mahasabha and other regional organisation of Ahirs. AIYM first National Conference was held in Purnea, Bihar on 17 to 20 April 1924.

== See also ==
- Yadav
- Ahir
- Bihari Ahir
- Yadavs of Nepal
- Sadgop
