= Bharatpur Stupa =

Bharatpur (Monorampur) Stupa ভরতপুর (মনোরমপুর) স্তূপ (in Bengali)
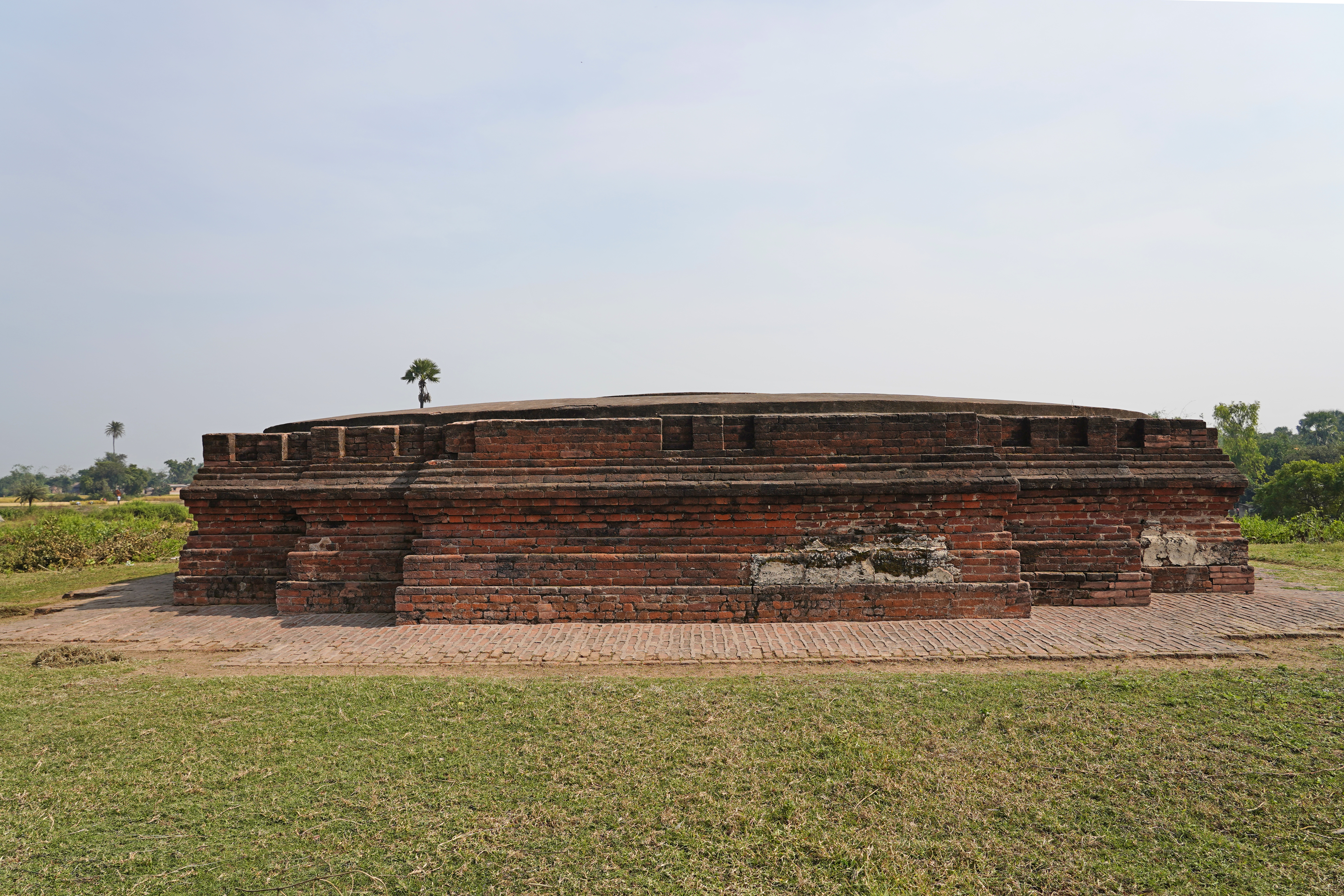

Religion
- Affiliation: Buddhism

Location
- Location: Bharatpur, Purba Bardhaman, West Bengal, India
- Interactive map of Bharatpur (Monorampur) Stupa ভরতপুর (মনোরমপুর) স্তূপ (in Bengali)
- Administration: Archaeological Survey of India
- Coordinates: 23.4117031°N 87.4441046°E

Architecture
- Type: Stupa
- Style: Pancharatha
- Completed: 7th-9th century AD
- Materials: Bricks and stones

The Bharatpur Stupa is a large stupa located at the Bharatpur archaeological site in the Indian state of West Bengal. Although the stupas discovered in West Bengal are small in size, this is a large stupa. Historians believe that this stupa was probably adjacent to a Buddhist monastery.

Bharatpur Stupa was built during the Pala period. Eleven Buddha statues seated on Vajrasana in Bhumiparsha Mudras – all five fingers of the right hand extended to touch the ground – were discovered in this ruined stupa.

The stupa was found by archaeologists during preliminary excavations conducted by the Eastern Circle of the Archaeological Survey of India and the University of Burdwan between 1972 and 1975.

== Description ==
Bharatpur (more close to the village named Monorampur) Stupa is the largest Buddhist Stupa in West Bengal. The stupa was built by bricks and stones in the Pancharatha style, with a base area of 13 square meters. The foundation of the stupa is laid on compact yellow sandy soil. Today, the base structure of the stupa survives, When the rest of the part was destroyed. Two different sizes of bricks are used in the construction, which are 30 x 8 x 7 cm and 48 x 21 x 6 cm respectively. A mixture of sand and lime was used for masonry. The facades are embellished with corbelled courses, moldings and chaitya gavaksa motifs of floral designs. Above the corbelled courses are niches in the walls of the stupa, which are at a height equivalent to the height of the human eye from the ground. These niches were probably decorated with Buddha statues.
