= Gopa Noona =

South Korean fashion model

- 전지은
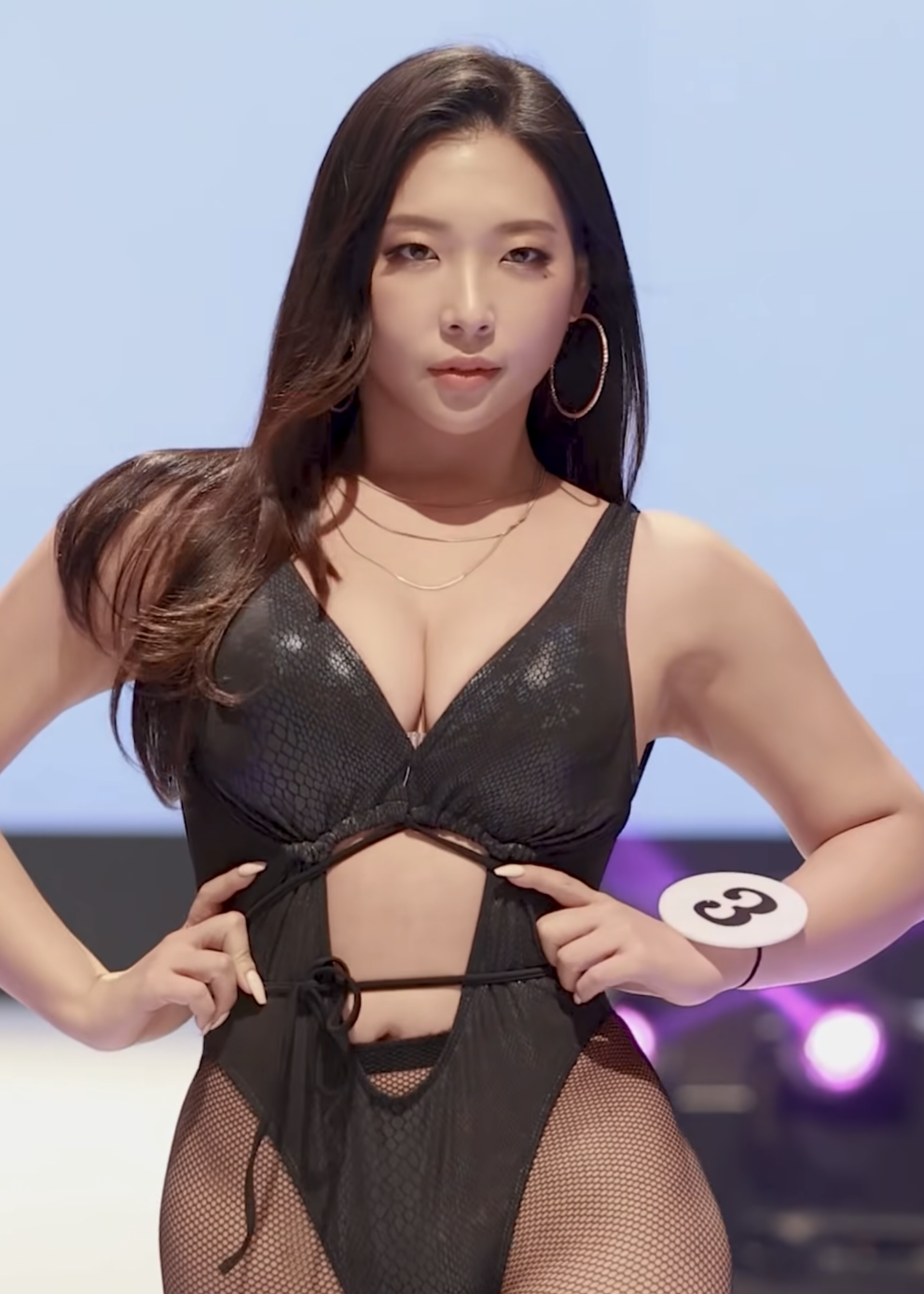
- Jeon at the Maxim Korea Plus Size Model Contest in 2021
- Born: Jeon Ji-eun; August 6, 1994 (age 32)
- Occupations: Fashion model, streamer
- Height: 170 cm (5 ft 7 in)

Jeon Ji-eun (Korean: 전지은; born August 6, 1994) is a South Korean fashion model and streamer, who rose to prominence as one of the first plus-sized models to be featured in Maxim magazine.

== Life and career ==
Ji-eun's early career was working as model specializing in underwater photoshoots.

=== Rise to prominence ===
Under the stage name Gopa, she competed in the first edition of the Korean Maxim magazine’s "Plus Size Model Contest (Plusacon)" in June 2021, where she won the Most Popular Award and was selected as Miss Maxim (along with Ssunbiki ). This was the first contest for plus-sized models sanctioned by the Korean Modelling Association.

She returned as a presenter at the third edition of Plusacon in July 2023.

After winning the Maxim modelling competition, she was featured in the September 2021 Korean edition the magazine, in their "Reader’s Car" section, where Maxim readers have a chance to see their car featured with a Maxim model. The winner got to meet Gopa was given a free subscription to the magazine for a year. As this was her first photoshoot, she recalls being nervous but excited before the event.

She is also active as a lifestyle and fashion streamer on Afreeca TV and YouTube.

In 2023, Gopa has worked with several other Korean models, promoting Mongolia as a potential tourist destination for South Koreans; she has done photoshoots on location in Dundgobi Province as part of the promotion. She also had the chance to meet with local herdsmen and government officials during the visit.

Gopa is featured as the cover model on the November 2023 Korean edition of Maxim magazine in a special limited edition volume, in which she posed for a photoshoot reminiscent of a Japanese hot spring. Some photos are taken in voyeuristic theme, which Gopa recalls: "It’s a really strange feeling to film as if you’re spying on me. Still, when I wear clothes that reveal my body, I secretly enjoy it when many people take a peek."

=== Name ===
Gopa has explained that she chose her professional name (originally "nan_baegopaahh", which means I’m hungry in Korean) in the hope that it was easier for foreign audiences to pronounce, hoping to spread her popularity as Miss Maxim around the globe.
