= Gourangapur =

- Village
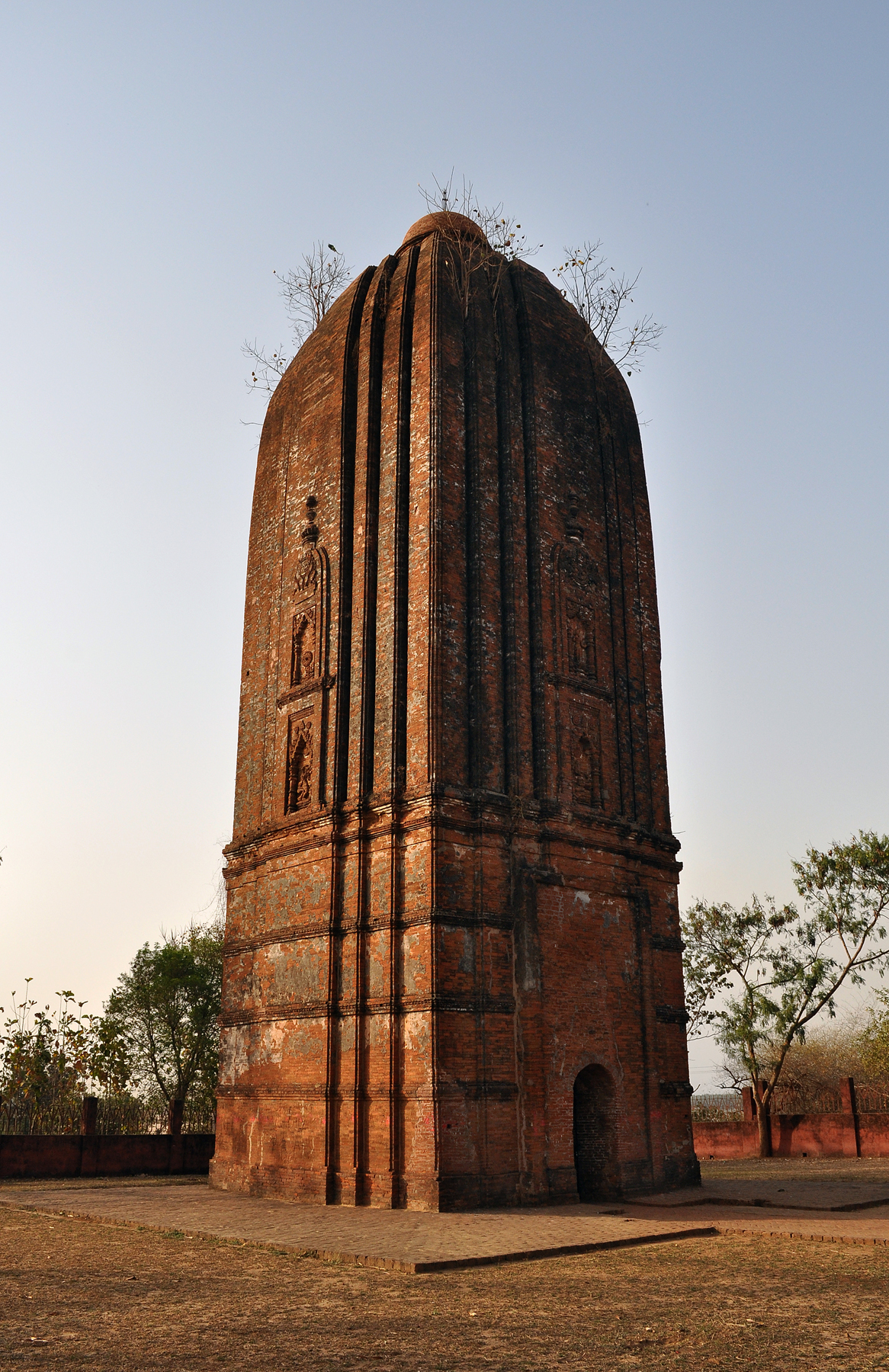
- Ichhai Ghosher Deul

- Location in West Bengal, India Gourangapur (India)
- Coordinates: 23.6081°N 87.4536°E
- Country: India
- State: West Bengal
- District: Paschim Bardhaman

Population (2011)
  - Total: 110

Languages
  - Official: Bengali, English
- Time zone: UTC+5:30 (IST)
- Lok Sabha constituency: Bardhaman-Durgapur
- Vidhan Sabha constituency: Galsi
- Website: paschimbardhaman.gov.in

Gourangapur is a village in Kanksa CD block in Durgapur subdivision of Paschim Bardhaman district in the Indian state of West Bengal. The place has links with Ichhai Ghosh, king of Gopbhum, and it is believed that his capital, Dhekur, was located nearby. The area was earlier a part of Senpahari pargana.

== History ==
According to Binoy Ghosh, Gopbhum, spread over a part of the present-day Purba Bardhaman and Paschim Bardhaman districts, had two Sadgop kings – one ruled from Amrargar and other from Dhekur (also known as Trisasthigar), near present-day Gourangapur. A copperplate inscription of Iswar Ghosh (popularly known as Ichhai Ghosh) was found at Ramganj in Dinajpur district sometime before 1833 AD. As per the inscription, Iswar Ghosh was son of Dhabal Ghosh, grandson of Bal Ghosh and great-grandson of Dhurta Ghosh. However, according to the Dharmamangal poems, Ichhai Ghosh was son of Som Ghosh. In spite of the differences, there is both literary and historical support for Ichhai Ghosh. He was the king of a subsidiary (samanta) kingdom, forming a part of Gopbhum, in the 11th century and was a contemporary of Mahipala, an important king of the Pala dynasty. Ichhai Ghosh was possibly more than just a regional power, because the copper edict shows that other kings in the area listened to him. It is possible that Ichhai Ghosh could carve out a large kingdom because Mahipala was kept busy by external pressures from the Chola dynasty of southern India and Kalachuris of central India.

The Dharmamangal poems speak of a battle between Ichhai Ghosh and Lau Sen, who was king of another subsidiary kingdom in the Medinipur area. The battle was fought at Kandunedanga on the south bank of the Ajay. The Dharmamangal poems mention a king Harishchandra but it is difficult to trace him historically.(He is not to be confused with the legendary Indian king Harishchandra mentioned in ancient Hindu texts).

See also - Garh Jungle for Raja Surath's Durga Puja

== Geography ==
Cities and towns in the southern and eastern portions of Durgapur subdivision in Paschim Bardhaman district
MC: Municipal Corporation, CT: census town, R: rural centre, A: airport, B: barrage, H: historical site
Owing to space constraints in the small map, the actual locations in a larger map may vary slightly

=== Location ===
Gourangapur is located at 23.6081°N 87.4536°E.

The place is densely forested on the southern bank of the Ajay, a little down-stream from Jaydev Kenduli, which is located on the northern bank of the river.

== Demographics ==
As per the 2011 Census of India, Gourangapur had a total population of 110 of which 56 (51%) were males and 54 (49%) were females. Population below 6 years was 22. The total number of literates in Gourangapur was 74 (84.09% of the population over 6 years).

== Culture ==
Ichhai Ghosher Deul is located at Gourangapur.It is a late mediaeval brick built temple. Scholars date it around 16th-17th century and it was possibly erected by the descendants of Ichhai Ghosh, to perpetuate his memory.

David J. McCutchion mentions Ichhai Ghoser Deul at Gourangapur as a large smooth curvilinear rekha deul, having a base of 20 feet square. It is a plain brick structure but for niches and images on tower.

According to the List of Monuments of National Importance in West Bengal the Ichhai Ghosh Temple is a monument of national importance.

Shyamarupargarh, is located nearby, deep in the forest. There is no trace of the temple of goddess Bhavani built by Ichhai Ghosh, but there is a small temple probably built later. Near Shyamarupargarh, the ruins of a huge building are there in the dense forest. Locals believe the ruins to be that of the palace of Ichhai Ghosh at what once was Dhekkuri or Dhekur, Ichhai Ghosh's capital.

=== Entertainment ===
The Deul Park at Gourangapur has come up as an entertainment centre for tourists.

== Gallery ==
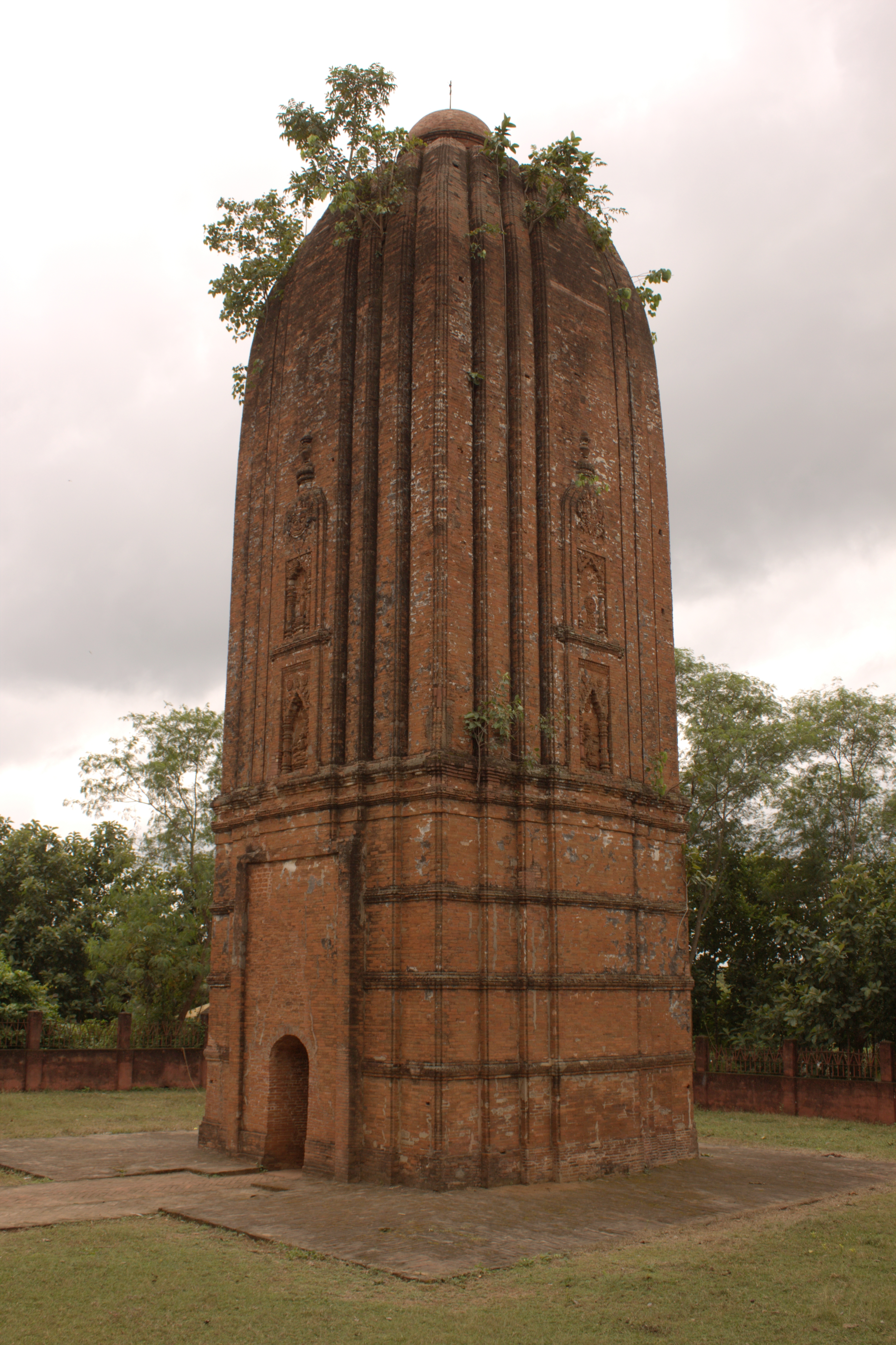

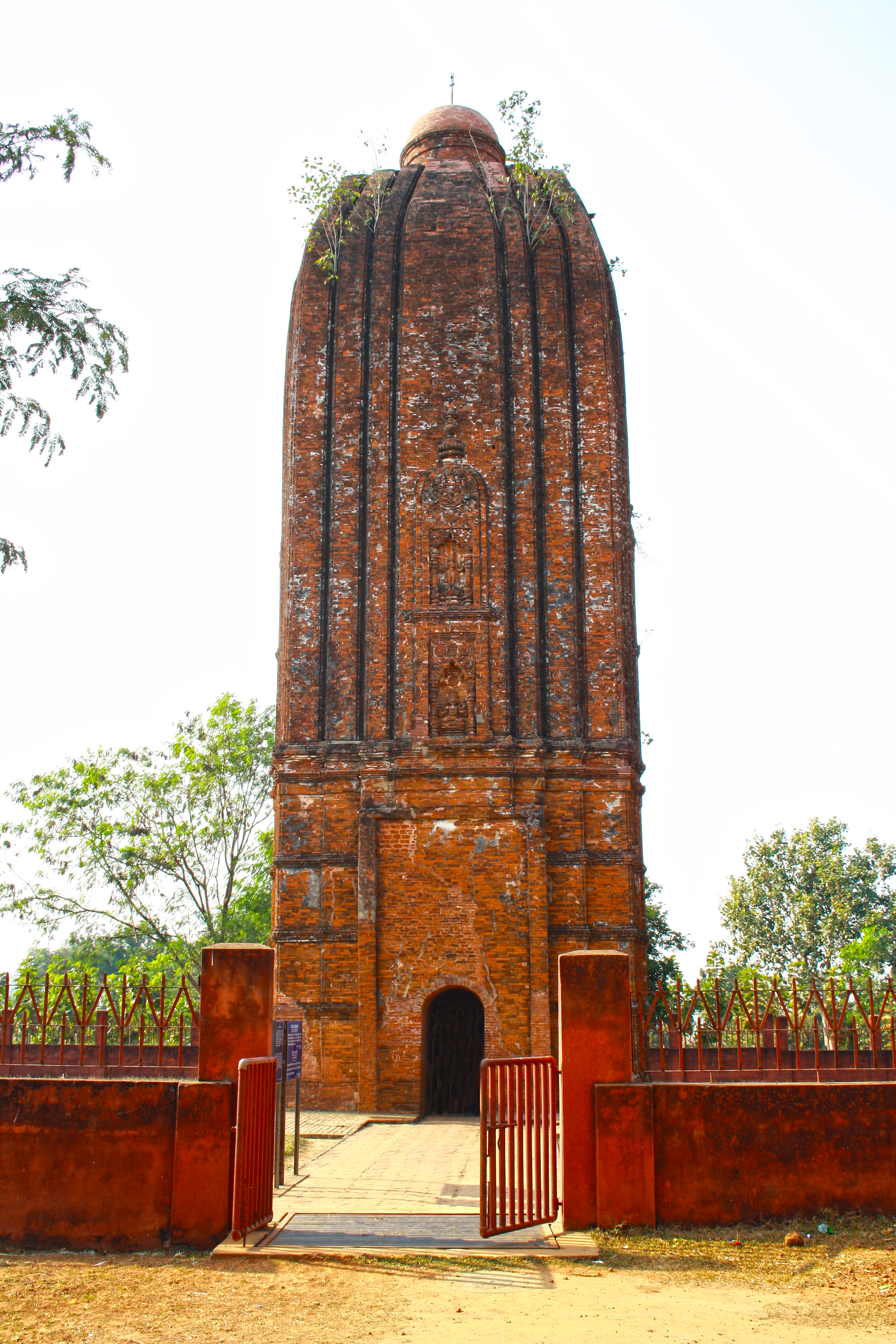

Note: Ichhai Ghosher Deul is having small plantations that may damage the temple. See Palpara to note how a temple has been protected
