= Aulchand =

Personal life
- Born: 1686
- Died: 1769/1770 or 1779 Boalia, Nadia, Bengal

Religious life
- Religion: Hinduism

Aulchand (Bengali: আউলচাঁদ; born 1686, died 1769/1770 or 1779) was a Bengali Hindu spiritual leader who founded the Kartabhaja philosophy. Kartabhajas consider Aulchand to be an incarnation of Chaityana.

== Early life ==
In 1694, Mahadeb Barui, a resident of Ula in Nadia discovered an abandoned male child in a betel plantation and decided to adopt him. At that time, the child was about eight years of age. He named the child Purna Chandra and raised him for 12 years. At the age of 20, Purna Chandra left his house. Thereafter he stayed in the house of a Gandhabanik for two years and then in the residence of a landlord for another one and half years. At the age of 24, he completely denounced the material life and went about wandering from place to place. He travelled to various regions especially in the districts of Nadia, 24 Parganas and the Sunderban area.

== Spiritual life ==
At the age of 37, he arrived at the village of Bejra, where Hatu Ghosh and others became his disciple. Most of his initial twenty two disciples were from the lower castes.

- Hatu Ghosh
- Bechu Ghosh
- Ramsharan Pal
- Nayan
- Lakshmikanta
- Nityananda Das
- Khelaram Udasin
- Krishna Das
- Hari Ghosh
- Kanai Ghosh
- Shankar
- Nitai Ghosh
- Ananda Ram
- Manohar Das
- Kinu
- Gobinda
- Shyam Kansari
- Bhimray Rajput
- Panchu Ruidas
- Nidhiram Ghosh
- Bishnu Das
- Shishuram

He founded the conservative Kartabhaja sect. Kartabhajas consider Aulchand to be an incarnation of Chaityana.

== Later life ==
Aulchand died in the village of Boalia. William Wilson Hunter wrote that this is said to have happened in 1769. Folklorist Dinesh Chandra Sen reaffirmed the year, and added that Aulchand was cremated in Parai. Another version has it that he died in 1770. In yet another version, Aulchand died in 1779 and was buried in Parari.
