= Kartabhaja =

Hindu-based interreligious organisation

The Kartabhaja (Bengali: কর্তাভজা), also known as the Kartabhaja Sampradaya (Bengali: কর্তাভজা সম্প্রদায়), literally, the Worshippers of the Master, is a religious community of West Bengal in eastern India, which came into prominence in the mid 18th century. It had a significant following in the late 18th century and early 19th century, but its following declined considerably in the early 20th century.

The founder of this community was Aulchand or Aulechand (c. 1686–1769), about whom very little is known, except a number of legends. Significant early leaders of this community were Ramsharan Pal, a disciple of Aulchand, his wife Sarasvati, popularly known as Sati Ma and their son Dulalchandra Pal. Under their leadership, Ghoshpara village (presently, a neighbourhood of Kalyani city) in Nadia district became a major centre of activities and later a pitha for the sect. An annual fair in Ghoshpara, known as the Sati Mar Dol Mela, is held in honour of Sati Ma on the day of Dol Purnima in February/March every year. This fair is attended by many followers of this sect.

== Aulchand and his disciples ==
Aulchand, founder of this community was also known as Aule Mahaprabhu, Kangali Mahaprabhu, Fakir Thakur, Siddha Purush, Sain Gosain and Purnachandra amongst his followers. Most of the legends on Satyamahaprabhu Aulchand or Aulechand are collected by Horace Hayman Wilson and Akshay Kumar Datta. According to these legends, in 1616 Saka era (1694), Mahadab Barui, a peasant of Ula village found Aulchand, an eight-year boy in his betel vine and decided to adopt him. After 12 years Aulchand left Ula and stayed in the house of a gandhabanik (perfumer) for two years. Next, he resided in the house of a landlord for 14 years. Next one and half year he lived somewhere in eastern Bengal and then started travelling from one place to another. At the age of 37, he came to Bejra village and Hatu Ghosh became his disciple. Soon, Ramsharan Pal also became his disciple. Besides Ramsharan Pal and Hatu Ghosh, his principal disciples included Bechu Ghosh, Nayan Das, Laksmhikanta, Nityananda Das, Khelaram Udasin, Krishnadas, Hari Ghosh, Kanai Ghosh, Shankar, Nitai Ghosh, Anandaram, Manohar Das, Bishnu Das, Kinu, Gobinda, Shyam Kansari, Bhimray Rajput, Panchu Ruidas, Sidhiram Ghosh and Shishuram. He died in Boyale village (in the present day Nadia district) in 1691 Saka era (1769). In addition to his 22 principal disciples, Aulchand had a number of followers, both Hindus, mainly from Sadgop, Raju and Muchi communities and Muslims. The disciples of Aulchand believed him as the reincarnation of Chaitanya Mahaprabhu.

After Aulchand's death, his followers were divided into two major groups. His principal eight disciples under the leadership of Ramsharan Pal established a center for religious activities at Ghoshpara. The other group founded their center at Parari village near Chakdaha and cremated Aulchand's body there. The leadership of the group led by Ramsharan Pal became hereditary after his death and his descendants were mentioned as the Shriyut or the Shrishriyut. The sectarian literature of this community mention the Gurus (leaders) as the Mahashayas (hosts) and the common members as the Baratis (guests).

== Dulalchandra Pal ==
In 1783, after the death of Ramsharan Pal, his wife Sati Ma became the leader of the community and she was succeeded by her son Ramdulal Pal or Dulalchandra Pal (1775–1852) after her death. His anthology of spiritual songs, mostly written between 1824 and 1828 under the nome de plume Lalshashi were collected by his four disciples and known as Bhaver Gita (Spiritual Songs). Almost 500 spiritual poems and songs written by a number of poets belonging to this community were published in two volumes, titled, Kartabhajar Gitavali (1872) and Shrishriyuter Padavali (1893). These works include most of the songs of Lalshashi. Dulalchandra Pal was succeeded by wife and she was succeeded by their son Ishvarchandra Pal.

== Practices and beliefs ==
According to H. H. Wilson, the distinctions of the Indian caste system were not followed by the members of this sect during their religious celebrations. According to Akshay Kumar Datta, the principal religious practices were chanting mantra and premanushthan (ritual of love), which they believe would lead to siddhi (perfection). The members of this sect met together regularly and these meetings, known as baithaks, continued till early morning. In these baithaks, they shared the expressions of prem (love) by crying, trembling, laughing loudly and grinding their teeth.

The four classes of the sect were Aul, Baul, Derveshes, and Sain.
