= Ssunbiki =

South Korean fashion model

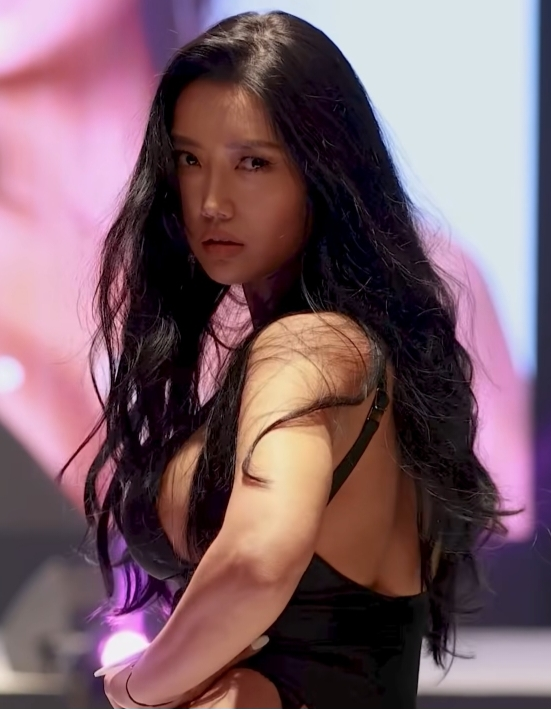
- Born: 1996 (age 29–30); Seoul
- Years active: 2021-present
- Height: 173 cm (5 ft 8 in)

Ssunbiki (Korean: 썬비키; born 1996) is a South Korean influencer and fashion model. She rose to prominence as one of the first plus-sized models in the country.

== Life and career ==
She appeared on the August 2021 Korean edition of Maxim magazine, after winning the "MAXIM NaturalSize Model Contest" on June 30 that year. She is one of several new "plus size" models in the country, after the Korea Model Association (KMA) started recognizing the category in competitions. Ssunbiki was the first winner of the contest for plus-sized models, designed to break "stereotypes about beauty and rediscover the natural beauty of 'voluptuous women'". Before the contest, she was active on social media and on YouTube. As the winner of the competition, Ssunbiki won a prize of 10 million South Korean won, and the chance to be featured on the cover of the magazine.

She was the first plus-sized model to grace the cover of the Korean edition of Maxim, appearing on the cover of the August 2021 edition. Editors had concerns about how the decision would be received; response has been overwhelmingly positive. The popularity of the cover led to a second edition of the "NaturalSize Model Contest" in 2022, where Ssunbiki appears as a presenter and spoke with fans at a press event.

In 2022 and 2023, she was working with a Mongolian travel company, filming commercials designed to attract tourists to the country, showing the destination in a variety of seasonal conditions. After appearing in commercials for a few different companies, her popularity has also been rising in Mongolia. During a 2023 interview, she explained she had also travelled to the United States, where she was preparing for a Netflix show.

She has also appeared in television commercials and print ads for a Korean food brand in Mongolia.

Ssunbiki appeared in the December 2023 South Korean edition of Maxim, in a BDSM concept pictorial, which she hoped would further show what plus-sized models can do.

== Personal details ==
Ssunbiki was born in 1996 in Seoul. In 2023, she was reported to be earning over a million dollars due to her fashion and digital marketing career, and is single with no children.
