= Binoy Ghosh =

- বিনয় ঘোষ
- Born: 14 June 1917; Calcutta, Bengal Presidency, British India
- Died: 24 July 1980 (aged 63); Kolkata, West Bengal, India
- Other name: Kalpecha (কালপেঁচা)
- Occupations: Sociologist, writer, researcher
- Awards: Rabindra Puraskar (1959)

Binoy Ghosh (14 June 1917 – 24 July 1980) was a journalist, sociologist, writer, literary critic and researcher. His Paschim Banger Sanskriti won the Rabindra Puraskar in 1959.

== Formative years ==
Binoy Ghosh, son of Biseswar Ghosh, who hailed from Jessore, now in Bangladesh, graduated from Asutosh College, Kolkata, and completed his post-graduation in ancient Indian history and anthropology from the University of Calcutta. He worked as a journalist in the editorial departments of Forward, Jugantar, Dainik Basumati and Arani.

== Writings ==
In his writings in Bengali, Binoy Ghosh covered both political and social and cultural topics. His writings were influenced by Marxist thought. On one hand, he wrote such books as Shilpa Sanskrti O Samaj (Industry, Culture and Society, 1940), Banglar Nabajagrti (Bengal Renaissance, 1948), Vidyasagar O Bangali Samaj (Vidyasagar and Bengali Society, 1957, in 4 volumes), Bidrohi Derozio (Rebel Derozio, 1961), Sutanuti Samachar (News of Sutanuti, 1962), Banglar Samajik Itihaser Dhara (Trends of Social History of Bengal, 1968), Banglar Bidvat Samaj (Learned Society of Bengal, 1973), Kolkata Shaharer Itibritta (History of Kolkata Town, 1975), Banglar Lokasanskrti O Samajtattva (Folk Culture and Sociology of Bengal, 1979) and Town Kolkatar Kadcha (Chronicle of Kolkata Town, 1961). On the other hand, his writings include Antarjatik Rajniti (International Politics), Soviet Sabhyata (Soviet Civilisation 2 vols), Fascism O Janayuddha (Fascism and People's War), Soviet Samaj O Sanskrti (Soviet Society and Culture) and Madhyabitta Bidroha (Middle-Class Rebellion). In 1957, he published Paschim Banger Sanskriti (Culture of West Bengal), based on extensive tours and field surveys right across West Bengal. It won the Rabindra Puraskar in 1959.

== Other activities ==
The Indian People's Theatre Association staged a play, Laboratory, written by him. He was a regular member of IPTA's music group. He published a collection of short stories, Dustbin, and a novel 304.
