= Sadgop =

Social community of India

Sadgop and Gop
Regions with significant populations
- Birbhum, Burdwan, Hooghly, Bankura, Midnapore, Murshidabad, 24 Parganas, Nadia

Languages
- Bengali

Religion
- Hinduism

Sadgop (Bengali: সদগোপ), also spelled as Sadgope, is a Bengali Hindu Yadav (Gopa) caste. Traditionally they are engaged in cultivation. Since late mediaeval period Sadgops had established themselves as dominant political power in peripheral lateritic forest areas of Rarh region, now included in Birbhum, Burdwan and Midnapore districts in West Bengal. Karnagarh, Narajole, Narayangarh and Balarampur in Midnapore and several other zamindari estates in Burdwan, Hooghly, Birbhum belonged to them. As of the late nineteenth century they were one of the fourteen castes belonging to 'Nabasakh' group.

== Origin ==
=== Etymology ===
The Sadgop name is derived from two Sanskrit word Sad and Gope, which means clean or good Gopes or milkmen.

=== Origin ===
The Sadgops are an offshoot of the pastoral Gopa caste who broke away from the main caste before the middle of the sixteenth century. Their switch to agriculture was only 'the starting point of rise to eminence'. Through extending their activities to trade, they established control over the land they had put under the plough. Thus, leaders from the group acquired political power at the local level. Later on the group also ventured into trade and worked as officials of the state and the big Zamindars. Members of the new group also made achievements in the fields of religion, and from dissident Gop families came popular saints like Syamananda and the founder of the influential Kartabhaja sect, Aulchand. In the process, they changed their jati affiliation by adding sad (sat, 'clean') to their name, thus becoming Sadgops.

The Sadgops believe they have descended from Lord Krishna.

== History ==
=== Varna ===
Sadgops have generally been considered as clean shudras (sat-shudras) in the caste structure of Bengal. Like south India social groups of east India usually divided in two grades - Brahmins and Shudras.

=== Sanskritisation ===
In the 1910s, Sadgops along with Ahirs, Gops, Gopals etc began claiming kshatriya status based on claimed descent from the legendary king Yadu. The Yadav-kshatriya movement attracted communities in the Gangetic plain who were associated with a combination of cultivation, cattle-herding, and dairy farming.

== Present circumstances ==
The Sadgop consist of a number of sub-divisions. They are an endogamous group and practice gotra exogamy. The Sadgop are mainly a landholding community, but many Sadgop have settled in Kolkata and other cities of West Bengal. Their own community organization is named as Bangiya Sadgop Samiti.

Sadgops and Gops(Goala) both were included in the list of 177 "backward classes" for the state of West Bengal by Mandal Commission. Gops were given Other Backward Class status in 1990s (now OBC-A in West Bengal), and Sadgops have been recognized as an other backward class (OBC-B) since June 2025.

== Notable people ==
- Rani Shiromani, Zamindar of Karnagarh, one of the leaders of Chuar Rebellion
- Mahendralal Sarkar, Indian physician, founder of Indian Association for the Cultivation of Science
- Rash Behari Ghosh, Indian politician, lawyer and social worker

== See also ==
- Gopa
- Yadav
- Gopbhum
