= Ausgram =

Ausgram may refer to:

- Ausgram, Bardhaman, a village in Ausgram II CD Block in Bardhaman district, West Bengal, India
- Ausgram I, a community development block, an administrative division in Bardhaman Sadar North subdivision of Bardhaman district in the Indian state of West Bengal
- Ausgram II, a community development block, an administrative division in Bardhaman Sadar North subdivision of Bardhaman district in the Indian state of West Bengal
- Ausgram (Vidhan Sabha constituency)
