= Dariapur =

Dariapur or Dwariapur may refer to one of the following places:

- Dariapur community development block, a block in Saran district, Bihar
- Dariapur (Ahmedabad), a locality in Central Ahmedabad
- Dariapur, Malda, a village in the Indian state of West Bengal
- Dwariapur, a village in southwestern Bangladesh
- Dwariapur, Bardhaman, a village in the Indian state of West Bengal
- Dariapur, Purba Medinipur, a village in the Indian state of West Bengal
