= Ausgram I =

- Community development block
- Location in West Bengal
- Coordinates: 23°31′04″N 87°39′37″E
- Country: India
- State: West Bengal
- District: Purba Bardhaman
- Parliamentary constituency: Bolpur
- Assembly constituency: Ausgram

Area
  - Total: 85.85 sq mi (222.34 km^{2})
- Elevation: 125 ft (38 m)

Population (2011)
  - Total: 119,363
  - Density: 1,390.4/sq mi (536.85/km^{2})
- Time zone: UTC+5.30 (IST)
- PIN: 713156 (Ausgram)
- Telephone/STD code: 03452
- Vehicle registration: WB-37,WB-38,WB-41,WB-42,WB-44
- Literacy Rate: 69.39 per cent
- Website: http://purbabardhaman.gov.in/

Ausgram I is a community development block that forms an administrative division in Bardhaman Sadar North subdivision of Purba Bardhaman district in the Indian state of West Bengal.

== History ==
=== Medieval history ===
The area between the Damodar and Ajay was known as Gopbhum, where the Sadgope kings ruled for many centuries, prior to the advent of the Muslims. The Sura kings also occupy a somewhat mythical position in the region. Adi Sura of this dynasty is credited with having brought the five Brahmins and Kayasthas (two important upper castes in Bengal) from Kannauj in what is now Uttar Pradesh.

In the 18th century the area faced massive attacks of the Bargi warriors.

=== Movements ===
This being a canal-irrigated area it had faced agitations against the imposition of taxes for canal water.

Damage to embankments of the Ajay and consequent flooding was a regular problem in the Ausgram and Mangalkot area. The devastating flood of 1943 caused immense suffering and lead to a mass movement for restoration/ repair of the embankments. A massive meeting was organised at Guskara in 1944, with Uday Chand Mahtab, Maharaja of Bardhaman. However, the government did not take any action,. Ultimately, the Communist Party, which had been at the forefront of agitations for some years, provided a huge work force for the purpose and completed the repair work. It laid the foundation for the party's popularity in the area.

== Geography ==
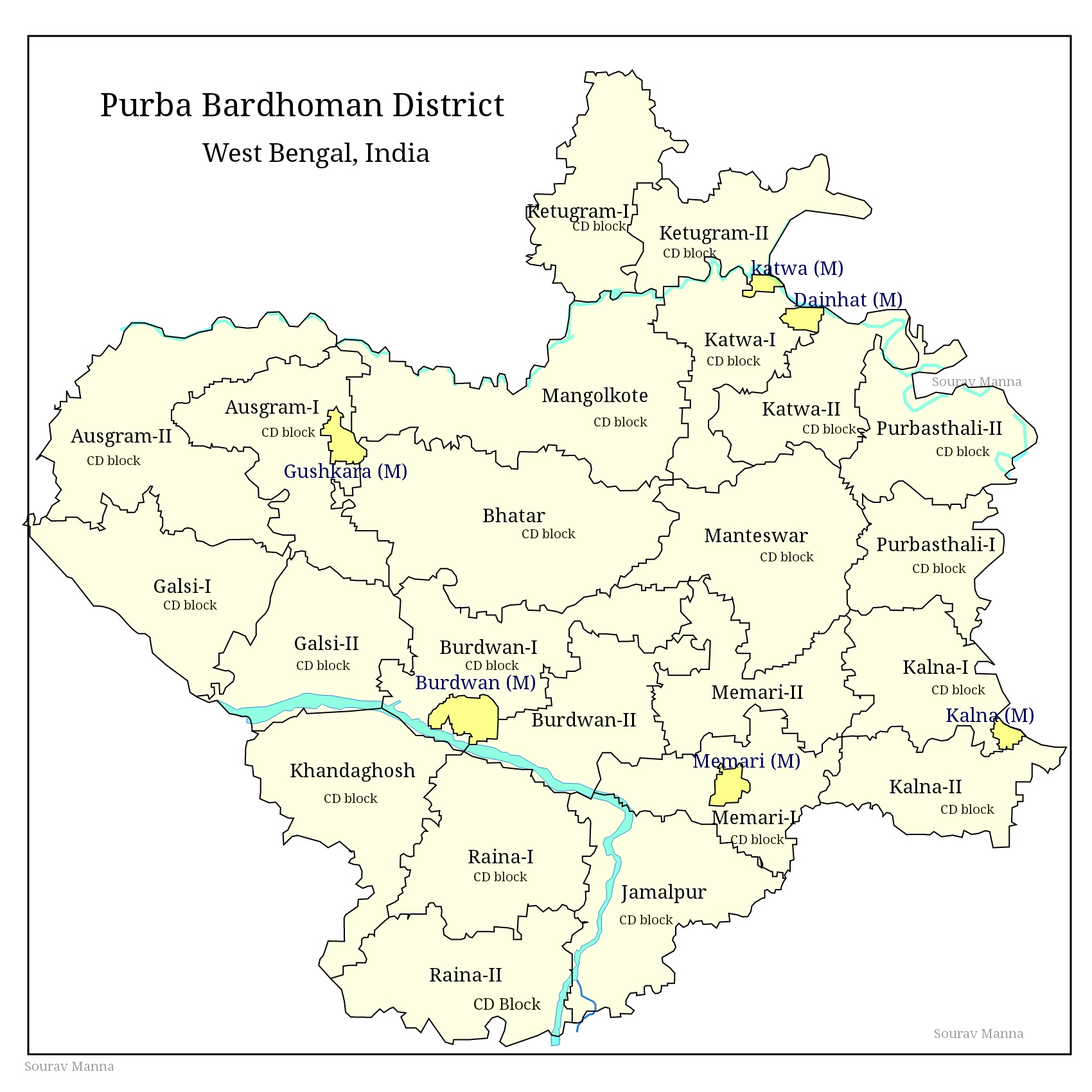
CD blocks of Purba Bardhaman district

=== Location ===
Ausgram is located at 23°31′04″N 87°39′37″E.

Ausgram I CD Block is part of the Kanksa Ketugram plain, which lies along the Ajay. The river forms a boundary with Birbhum district on the north for a long stretch and then flows through district. The uneven laterite territory found in the western part of Bardhaman district extends up to Ausgram and then the alluvial flood plains commence. The entire Durgapur- Kanksa-Faridpur-Ausgram area was densely forested even in more recent times. The influx of refugees from East Pakistan and their rehabilitation in the area, and irrigation facilities extended by Damodar Valley Corporation led to destruction of much of the forests in the area, but some still remain.

Ausgram I CD Block is bounded by Ausgram II on the north and the west, Mangolkote and Bhatar CD Blocks on the east and Galsi II CD Block on the south.

Ausgram I CD Block has an area of 222.34 km^{2}. It has 1 panchayat samity, 7 gram panchayats, 92 gram sansads (village councils), 61 mouzas and 58 inhabited villages. Ausgram police station serves this block. Headquarters of this CD Block is at Guskara.

Ramnabagan Wildlife Sanctuary, established in 1981 and covering an area of 0.14 km^{2} forms a part of Ausgram I block.

Gram panchayats of Ausgram I block/panchayat samiti are: Ausgram, Berenda, Billagram, Dignagar I, Dignagar II, Guskara II and Ukta.

== Demographics ==
=== Population ===
As per the 2011 Census of India Ausgram I CD Block had a total population of 119,363, all of which were rural. There were 60,521 (51%) males and 58,842 (49%) females. Population below 6 years was 13,581. Scheduled Castes numbered 42,659 (35.74%) and Scheduled Tribes numbered 15,577 (13.05%).

As per 2001 census, Ausgram I block had a total population of 106,813, out of which 54,623 were males and 52,190 were females. Ausgram I block registered a population growth of 13.75 per cent during the 1991-2001 decade. Decadal growth for Bardhaman district was 14.36 per cent. Decadal growth in West Bengal was 17.84 per cent. Scheduled castes at 39,576 formed around one-third the population. Scheduled tribes numbered 14,191.

Large villages (with 4,000+ population) in Ausgram I CD Block are (2011 census figures in brackets): Ban Nabagram (4,917), Karatia (4,021), Ausgram (5,533), Shibada (4,484), Belgram (4,345), Dignagar (8,313) and Bhota (4,022),

Other villages in Ausgram I CD Block included (2011 census figures in brackets): Beranda (2,214), Ukta (2,969), Dwariapur (3,579), Alefnagar, Aligram, Alutia (P), Asinda, Ausgram Chak, Baburbandh, Bahamanpur, Bara Chatra, Batagram, Belari, Beluti, Beranda, Bhada, Bhatgonna, Brajapur, Chonari, Deasa, Digha, Gangarampur, Gopinathbati, Gobindapur Purbba, Gonna, Jadabganj, Jaykrishnapur, Kalyanpur, Karanji, Karatia, Kayrapur, Kumarganj, Kunjanagar, Kurumba, Lakshmiganj, Majhergram, Mallikpur, Nabagram, Naoda, Nripatigram, Parasurampur, Pichkuri, Purbba Tati, Ramchandrapur, Sahapur, Shibbati, Shitalgram, Silut, Soara, Somaipur, Srikrishnapur, Srinagar, Sundalpur, Takipur, Telota and Warishpur.

=== Literacy ===
As per the 2011 census the total number of literates in Ausgram I CD Block was 73,406 (69.39% of the population over 6 years) out of which males numbered 40,948 (76.32% of the male population over 6 years) and females numbered 32,458 (62.26% of the female population over 6 years). The gender disparity (the difference between female and male literacy rates) was 14.06%.

As per 2001 census, Ausgram I block had a total literacy of 62.53 per cent for the 6+ age group. While male literacy was 71.85 per cent female literacy was 52.77 per cent. Bardhaman district had a total literacy of 70.18 per cent, male literacy being 78.63 per cent and female literacy being 60.95 per cent.

See also – List of West Bengal districts ranked by literacy rate

Literacy in CD blocks of
Bardhaman district
Bardhaman Sadar North subdivision
Ausgram I – 69.39%
Ausgram II – 68.00%
Bhatar – 71.56%
Burdwan I – 76.07%
Burdwan II – 74.12%
Galsi II – 70.05%
Bardhaman Sadar South subdivision
Khandaghosh – 77.28%
Raina I – 80.20%
Raina II – 81.48%
Jamalpur – 74.08%
Memari I – 74.10%
Memari II – 74.59%
Kalna subdivision
Kalna I – 75.81%
Kalna II – 76.25%
Manteswar – 73.08%
Purbasthali I – 77.59%
Purbasthali II – 70.35%
Katwa subdivision
Katwa I – 70.36%
Katwa II – 69.16%
Ketugram I – 68.00%
Ketugram II – 65.96%
Mongalkote – 67.97%
Durgapur subdivision
Andal – 77.25%
Faridpur Durgapur – 74.14%
Galsi I – 72.81%
Kanksa – 76.34%
Pandabeswar – 73.01%
Asansol subdivision
Barabani – 69.58%
Jamuria – 69.42%
Raniganj – 73.86%
Salanpur – 78.76%
2011 Census: CD Block Wise

Primary Census Abstract Data

=== Languages and religion ===
Religion in Ausgram I CD block (2011)
Hinduism	76.11%
Islam	23.48%
Other or not stated	0.41%

In the 2011 census Hindus numbered 90,850 and formed 76.11% of the population in Ausgram I CD Block. Muslims numbered 28,024 and formed 23.48% of the population. Christians numbered 329 and formed 0.28% of the population. Others numbered 160 and formed 0.13% of the population.

In Bardhaman district the percentage of Hindu population has been declining from 84.3% in 1961 to 77.9% in 2011 and the percentage of Muslim population has increased from 15.2% in 1961 to 20.7% in 2011.

Languages of Ausgram I CD block (2011)
1. Bengali (86.8%)
2. Santali (12.9%)
3. Others (0.33%)

At the time of the 2011 census, 86.76% of the population spoke Bengali and 12.91% Santali as their first language.

== Rural poverty ==
As per poverty estimates obtained from household survey for families living below poverty line in 2005, rural poverty in Ausgram I CD Block was 42.11%.

== Economy ==
=== Livelihood ===
In Ausgram I CD Block in 2011, amongst the class of total workers, cultivators formed 17.04%, agricultural labourers 63.24%, household industry workers 4.48% and other workers 15.24%.

In Ausgram I CD Block, cultivators or agricultural labourers formed a large portion of the workforce, comparatively less workers were engaged in the secondary and tertiary sectors.

=== Infrastructure ===
There are 58 inhabited villages in Ausgram I CD block. All 58 villages (100%) have power supply. 54 villages (93.10%) have drinking water supply. 20 villages (34.48%) have post offices. 52 villages (89.66%) have telephones (including landlines, public call offices and mobile phones). 24 villages (41.38%) have a pucca (paved) approach road and 33 villages (56.90%) have transport communication (includes bus service, rail facility and navigable waterways). 13 villages (22.41%) have agricultural credit societies. 5 villages (8.62%) have banks.

In 2013-14, there were 79 fertiliser depots, 23 seed stores and 46 fair price shops in the CD Block.

=== Agriculture ===
Persons engaged in agriculture
in Ausgram I CD Block
1. Bargadars (6.67%)
2. Patta holders (18.4%)
3. Small farmers (4.32%)
4. Marginal farmers (12.6%)
5. Agricultural labourers (58.0%)

Although the Bargadari Act of 1950 recognised the rights of bargadars to a higher share of crops from the land that they tilled, it was not implemented fully. Large tracts, beyond the prescribed limit of land ceiling, remained with the rich landlords. From 1977 onwards major land reforms took place in West Bengal. Land in excess of land ceiling was acquired and distributed amongst the peasants. Following land reforms land ownership pattern has undergone transformation. In 2013-14, persons engaged in agriculture in Ausgram I CD Block could be classified as follows: bargadars 6.67%, patta (document) holders 18.39%, small farmers (possessing land between 1 and 2 hectares) 4.32%, marginal farmers (possessing land up to 1 hectare) 12.62% and agricultural labourers 58.00%.

In 2003-04 net cropped area in Ausgram I CD Block was 14,110 hectares and the area in which more than one crop was grown was 6,850 hectares.

In 2013-14, Ausgram I CD Block produced 3,763 tonnes of Aman paddy, the main winter crop from 1,344 hectares, 2,414 tonnes of Aus paddy (summer crop) from 982 hectares, 5,624 tonnes of Boro paddy (spring crop) from 1,403 hectares, 305 tonnes of wheat from 123 hectares, 38,175 tonnes of potatoes from 1,867 hectares and 721 tonnes of sugar cane from 9 hectares. It also produced pulses and oilseeds.

In Bardhaman district as a whole Aman paddy constituted 64.32% of the total area under paddy cultivation, while the area under Boro and Aus paddy constituted 32.87% and 2.81% respectively. The expansion of Boro paddy cultivation, with higher yield rates, was the result of expansion of irrigation system and intensive cropping. In 2013-14, the total area irrigated in Ausgram I CD Block was 11,385.18 hectares, out of which 11,372.76 hectares were irrigated by canal water and 12.42 hectares by deep tube wells.

=== Banking ===
In 2013-14, Ausgram I CD Block had offices of 6 commercial banks and 2 gramin banks.

== Transport ==
Ausgram I CD Block has 4 originating/ terminating bus routes.

The Khana-Barharwa section of Sahibganj Loop passes through the CD Block and there is a station at Guskhara.

SH 13, running from Mollarpui Maghipara (in Birbhum district) to Dankuni (in Hooghly district), passes through this CD Block.

== Education ==
In 2013-14, Ausgram I CD Block had 94 primary schools with 6,781 students, 12 high school with 6,288 students and 5 higher secondary schools with 4,408 students. Ausgram I CD Block had 2 technical/ professional institutions with 250 students and 221 institutions for special and non-formal education with 9,183 students

As per the 2011 census, in Ausgram I CD block, amongst the 58 inhabited villages, all villages had a school, 35 villages had two or more primary schools, 20 villages had at least 1 primary and 1 middle school and 15 villages had at least 1 middle and 1 secondary school.

More than 6,000 schools (in erstwhile Bardhaman district) serve cooked midday meal to more than 900,000 students.

== Culture ==
The area is renowned for its dhokra art castings. In particular, Dariapur village in the area is famous for its dhokra metal craft.

== Healthcare ==
In 2014, Ausgram I CD Block had 1 block primary health centre and 3 primary health centres with total 35 beds and 6 doctors (excluding private bodies). It had 21 family welfare subcentres. 2,612 patients were treated indoor and 228,599 patients were treated outdoor in the hospitals, health centres and subcentres of the CD Block.

Bononabagram Rural Hospital at Bononabagram (with 30 beds) is the main medical facility in Ausgram I CD block. There are primary health centres at Guskara (with 10 beds), Ukta, PO Pitchkuri Dhal (with 4 beds) and Dignagar (with 6 beds).

Ausgram I CD Block is one of the areas of Bardhaman district which is affected by a low level of arsenic contamination of ground water.
