= Meera Mukherjee =

Indian sculptor and writer (1923–1998)

- Meera Mukherejee
- Born: 1923; Kolkata, West Bengal, India
- Died: 1998 (aged 74–75)
- Education: Government College of Art and Craft, Delhi Polytechnic (now Delhi Technological University)
- Known for: Sculpture
- Parent(s): Dwijendramohan Mukherjee; Binapani Devi
- Awards: Padma Shri; Press Award; Kolkata Ladies’ Study Group Award; Abanindra Prize

Meera Mukherjee (1923–1998) was an Indian sculptor and writer, known for bringing modernity to the ancient Bengali sculpting art. She is known to have used innovative bronze casting techniques, improving the Dhokra method employing Lost-wax casting, which she learnt during her training days of the Bastar sculpting tradition of Chhattisgarh. She received the fourth highest civilian award of the Padma Shri from the Government of India in 1992 for her contributions to Arts.

== Early life and education ==
Meera Mukherjee, born in Kolkata to Dwijendramohan Mukherjee and Binapani Devi in 1923, had her initial training in Arts at the Indian Society of Oriental Art of Abanindranath Tagore where she stayed till her marriage in 1941. The marriage was short-lived and Mukherjee, after the divorce, resumed her art studies by joining the Government College of Art and Craft, Kolkata and the Delhi Polytechnic, Delhi (present day Delhi Technological University) and secured diploma in painting, graphics and sculpture. Later, she assisted Affandi, an Indonesian artist, during his visit to Shantiniketan in 1951. Following here first solo exhibition in 1952, she received an Indo-German Fellowship in 1953 to hone her skills at the Academy of Fine Arts, Munich. This gave her opportunities to work under Toni Stadler and Heinrich Kirchner. It was the former who supported Mukherjee's transition from a painter to a sculptor. She returned to India in 1957 and took up the job as an art teacher at Dowhill School, Kurseong where she stayed till 1959. From here, she moved to Pratt Memorial School, Kolkata and taught there for one year, before resigning in 1960.

== Career and influences ==
After her return to India, Mukherjee was commissioned by the Anthropological Survey of India (ASI) to document the craft practices of metal-craftsmen in Central India. From 1961 up until 1964, she worked as a Senior Research Fellowship at the ASI and continued to conduct surveys on metal-craftsmen across India and Nepal. Her journey in India spread across the tribal heartland in the state of Madhya Pradesh, the east and the south. She was on a quest to discover the confluence of art forms with the daily lives of the artisans. During her tenure as a Senior Fellow, she was also closely associated with the promoters of 'living traditions' such as Prabash Sen and Kamaladevi Chattopadhyay.

The research and documentation carried out by Mukherjee gradually turned her into an 'artist-anthropologist'. She began incorporating the folk-art techniques into her own work. Her inclination towards folk arts of India was initially influenced by Stadler. He had asked Meera to find inspiration for her art not in Europe, but in the local traditions of her own country.

Mukherjee trained in Dhokra casting technique under the tribal artisans of Bastar of Chhattisgarh.

By the 1970s and 80s, she started exhibiting her works at Kolkata and Delhi along with Germany, the United Kingdom and Japan.

Known to create only a few pieces a year, she created many notable works like Ashoka in Kalinga, Earth Carriers, Smiths Working Under a Tree, Mother and Child, Srishti, The Rumour and portrait of Nirmal Sengupta. One of her creations, Emperor Asoka is on display at the Nandiya Gardens of ITC Maurya, New Delhi. Her works have featured in many international auctions such as that of Christie's and Invaluable. Simultaneously, she pursued a career as a writer of children's stories and published a few books, Little Flower Shefali and Other Stories, Kalo and the Koel and Catching Fish and Other Stories being some of the notable ones. She also published one monograph, Metal Craft in India in 1978, and two books on the traditional metal craft in India namely Metal Craftsmen in India in 1979 and In Search of Viswakarma in 1994.

Meera Mukherjee died in 1998, at the age of 75.

== Awards and honours ==
Mukherjee received the Press Award for the Master Craftsman, in 1968, from the President of India. An Emeritus Fellow of the Indian government, she received the Excellence Award from Kolkata Ladies’ Study Group in 1976 and the Abanindra Prize in 1981 from the Government of West Bengal. She held the fellowship from the Ministry of Culture from 1984 to 1986. The Government of India awarded her the civilian honour of the Padma Shri in 1992.

== Bibliography ==
- Mukherjee, Meera (1998). Little Flower Shefali and Other Stories. Seagull Books. p. 52. ISBN 978-8170461791.
- Mukherjee, Meera (1998). Kalo and the Koel. Seagull Books. p. 32. ISBN 978-8170461548.
- Mukherjee, Meera (2000). Little Flower Shefali and Other Stories. Seagull Books. p. 51. ISBN 978-8170461807.
- Mukherjee, Meera (1978). Metal Craftsmen in India. Anthropological Survey of India. p. 461.
- Mukherjee, Meera (1979). Metal Craft in India. Anthropological Survey of India.
- Mukherjee, Meera (1994). In Search of Viswakarma. p. 120.
- Mukherjee, Meera; Ghosh, D. P. (1977). Folk Metal Craft of Eastern India. All India Handicrafts Board, Ministry of Commerce, Government of India.

== See also ==
- Abanindranath Tagore
- Shantiniketan
- Dhokra
- Government College of Art and Craft
