= Bononabagram =

- Village
- Location in West Bengal, India Bononabagram (India)
- Coordinates: 23.5418°N 87.6232°E
- Country: India
- State: West Bengal
- District: Purba Bardhaman

Population (2011)
  - Total: 4,179

Languages
  - Official: Bengali, English
- Time zone: UTC+5:30 (IST)
- Lok Sabha constituency: Bolpur
- Vidhan Sabha constituency: Ausgram
- Website: purbabardhaman.gov.in

Bononabagram is a village in Ausgram I CD Block in Bardhaman Sadar North subdivision of Purba Bardhaman district in the Indian state of West Bengal.

== Geography ==
Cities and towns in the Bardhaman Sadar North subdivision of Purba Bardhaman district
M: municipal city/ town, CT: census town, R: rural/ urban centre, H: historical site, W: river project, C: craft centre
Owing to space constraints in the small map, the actual locations in a larger map may vary slightly

=== Location ===
Bononabagram is located at 23.5418°N 87.6232°E.

=== Urbanisation ===
73.58% of the population of Bardhaman Sadar North subdivision lives in the rural areas. Only 26.42% of the population lives in the urban areas, and that is the highest proportion of urban population amongst the four subdivisions in Purba Bardhaman district. The map alongside presents some of the notable locations in the subdivision. All places marked in the map are linked in the larger full screen map.

== Demographics ==
As per the 2011 Census of India, Ban Nabagram had a total population of 4,179 of which 2,074 (50%) were males and 2,105 (50%) were females. Population below 6 years was 234. The total number of literates in Ban Nabagram was 2,350 (59.50% of the population over 6 years).

== Transport ==
Bononabagram is on Radhamohanpur-Guskara Road.

== Education ==
Ban Nabagram High School is a co-educational higher secondary school.

== Healthcare ==
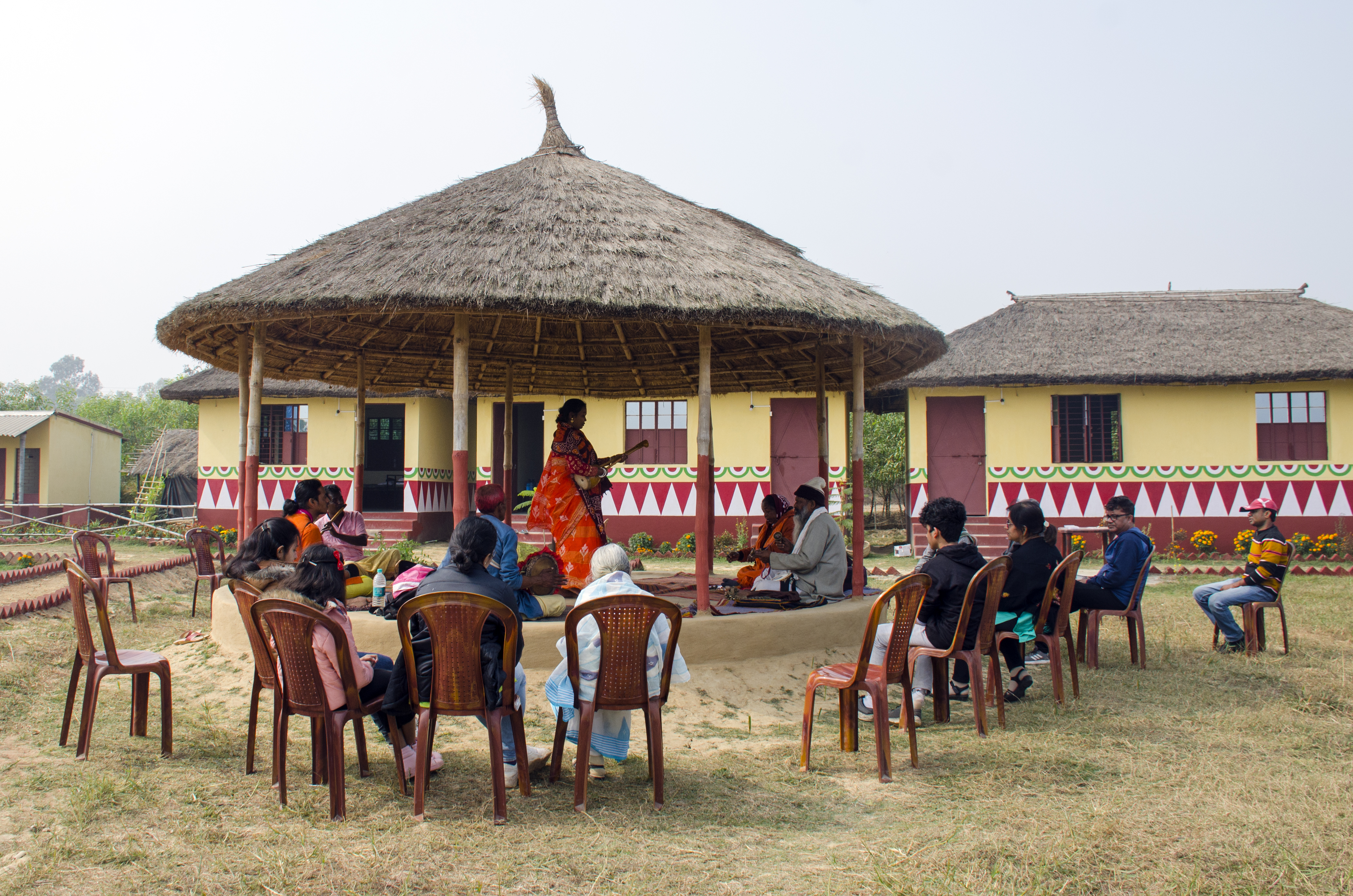
Visitors enjoy a Baul performance at Bononabagram Baul Ashram

Bononabagram Rural Hospital at Bononabagram (with 30 beds) is the main medical facility in Ausgram I CD block. There are primary health centres at Guskara (with 10 beds), Ukta, PO Pitchkuri Dhal (with 4 beds) and Dignagar (with 6 beds).

See also - Healthcare in West Bengal

== Bononabagram Baul Ashram ==
An initiative of Bangla Natak Dot Com, a Kolkata based social enterprise, the Bononabagram Baul Ashram aims at promoting traditional Baul music. Set up in a rustic open setting the ashram provides a music experience throughout the year. Different groups of baul singers are invited every week to provide a musical experience to the guest. The ashram also has staying options and music lovers can stay overnight to enjoy the music and the organic food that comes straight from the vegetable gardens. During the winter months special music programmes are held, which attracts a lot of visitors.
