= Kalita Maji =

Indian politician

Minister of State for Department of Housing, Government of West Bengal
- Incumbent
- Assumed office 1 June 2026
- Governor: R. N. Ravi
- Chief Minister: Suvendu Adhikari

Member of the West Bengal Legislative Assembly
- Incumbent
- Assumed office 4 May 2026
- Preceded by: Abhedananda Thander
- Constituency: Ausgram

Personal details
- Party: Bharatiya Janata Party
- Spouse: Subrata Majhi
- Profession: Politician

Kalita Majhi is an Indian politician serving as a Member of the Legislative Assembly (MLA) from the Ausgram constituency in West Bengal and she is also Minister of State in West Bengal.

== Personal life and background ==
Majhi initially worked as a domestic workers in multiple household at Ausgram, Bardhaman to support her family. Her husband earns a living as a plumber.

== Electoral politics ==
She became the member of the Bharatiya Janata Party, contested from the Ausgram Vidhan Sanha in 2026. Finally she was elected in the 2026 West Bengal Legislative Assembly election.
