= Abhedananda Thander =

Indian politician

Member of the West Bengal Legislative Assembly
- In office 2016–2026
- Preceded by: Basudeb Mete
- Succeeded by: Kalita Maji
- Constituency: Ausgram

Personal details
- Party: AITC
- Profession: Politician

Abhedananda Thander, is an Indian politician member of All India Trinamool Congress. He is an MLA, elected from the Ausgram constituency in the 2016 West Bengal state assembly election. In 2021 assembly election he was re-elected from the same constituency.
