= Dwariapur =

- Location in Bangladesh
- Coordinates: 22°43′N 90°11′E
- Country: Bangladesh
- Division: Barisal Division
- District: Jhalokati District
- Time zone: UTC+6 (Bangladesh Time)

For the village of same name associated with dhokra craft see Dwariapur, Bardhaman

Dwariapur is a village in Jhalokati District in the Barisal Division of southwestern Bangladesh.
