= Ausgram, Bardhaman =

Ausgram
- Village
- Location in West Bengal, India Ausgram (India)
- Coordinates: 23°32′08.5″N 87°39′42.5″E
- Country: India
- State: West Bengal
- District: Purba Bardhaman

Population (2011)
  - Total: 5,533

Languages
  - Official: Bengali, English
- Time zone: UTC+5:30 (IST)
- Telephone/STD code: 03452
- Lok Sabha constituency: Bolpur
- Vidhan Sabha constituency: Ausgram
- Website: purbabardhaman.gov.in

Ausgram is a village in Ausgram I CD block in Bardhaman Sadar North subdivision of Purba Bardhaman district in the state of West Bengal, India.

== Overview ==
Ausgram lies in the Kanksa Ketugram Plain, in the northern part of the district. Bardhaman Sadar North subdivision extends from the Kanksa Ketugram plain, which lies along the Ajay on the north to the Bardhaman Plain, the central plain area of the district, with the Damodar on the south and the east.

== Geography ==
Cities and towns in the Bardhaman Sadar North subdivision of Purba Bardhaman district
M: municipal city/ town, CT: census town, R: rural/ urban centre, H: historical site, W: river project, C: craft centre
Owing to space constraints in the small map, the actual locations in a larger map may vary slightly

=== Urbanisation ===
73.58% of the population of Bardhaman Sadar North subdivision lives in the rural areas. Only 26.42% of the population lives in the urban areas, and that is the highest proportion of urban population amongst the four subdivisions in Purba Bardhaman district. The map alongside presents some of the notable locations in the subdivision. All places marked in the map are linked in the larger full screen map.

=== Police station ===
Aushgram police station has jurisdiction over Guskara municipality and parts of Ausgram I and Ausgram II CD Blocks. The area covered is 198.90 km^{2}.

== Demographics ==
As per the 2011 Census of India Ausgram had a total population of 5,533, of which 2,826 (51%) were males and 2,707 (49%) were females. Population below 6 years was 212. The total number of literates in Ausgram was 3,542 (66.57% of the population over 6 years).

== Education ==
Ausgram High School was established in 1954. A co-educational Bengali medium school it has arrangements for teaching from Class V to Class XII.

== Healthcare ==
Bononabagram Rural Hospital at Bononabagram (with 30 beds) is located nearby.
