= Dwariapur, Bardhaman =

Dwariapur
- Village
- Location in West Bengal, India Dwariapur (India)
- Coordinates: 23.464194°N 87.70043°E
- Country: India
- State: West Bengal
- District: Purba Bardhaman

Government
  - Type: Panchayati raj (India)
  - Body: Gram panchayat

Population (2001)
  - Total: 3.571

Languages
  - Official: Bengali, English
- Time zone: UTC+5:30 (IST)
- PIN: 713156 (Gonna Dwariapur)
- ISO 3166 code: IN-WB
- Vehicle registration: WB
- Lok Sabha constituency: Bolpur
- Vidhan Sabha constituency: Ausgram
- Website: purbabardhaman.gov.in

For village of same name in Pirojpur District in the Barisal Division of southwestern Bangladesh see Dwariapur

Dwariapur (also spelt Dariapur) is a village under Dignagar II gram panchayat of Ausgram I block in Bardhaman Sadar North subdivision of Purba Bardhaman district in the Indian state of West Bengal.

== Geography ==
Cities and towns in the Bardhaman Sadar North subdivision of Purba Bardhaman district
M: municipal city/ town, CT: census town, R: rural/ urban centre, H: historical site, W: river project, C: craft centre
Owing to space constraints in the small map, the actual locations in a larger map may vary slightly

=== Location ===
Dwariapur is located at 23°27′51″N 87°42′02″E.

== Demographics ==
As per the 2011 Census of India, Dwariapur had a total population of 3,571, of which 1,764 (49%) were males and 1,807 (51%) were females. Population below 6 years was 460. The total number of literates in Dwariapur was 2,302 (74.00% of the population over 6 years).

== Dhokra craft ==
There is a group of families involved in making dhokra craft at Dwariapur. They originally belonged to the former princely Bastar state in Central India, now Bastar district in Chhattisgarh. They migrated to what is now Dhenkanal district in Odisha and then on to Medinipur, Bankura, Purulia and Bardhaman - they were scattered all around. In Purba Bardhaman district, they settled in Dwariapur. They make metal castings by a process that is believed to have been practised from ancient times and they learnt the traditional intricacies from their fore-fathers.

Around 1952, there were 15/ 16 families at Dwariapur involved in this metal craft. They made small metallic measuring bowls, small deities and decorative items and sold them to villagers. They were extremely poor and mostly illiterate. The artistry of their craft was appreciated and attracted attention. Subsequently, Government agencies stepped in. A few of them were taken to Kolkata for training in design centres in order to enlighten them about updating their practices. They were provided with loans and steps were taken to market their products.

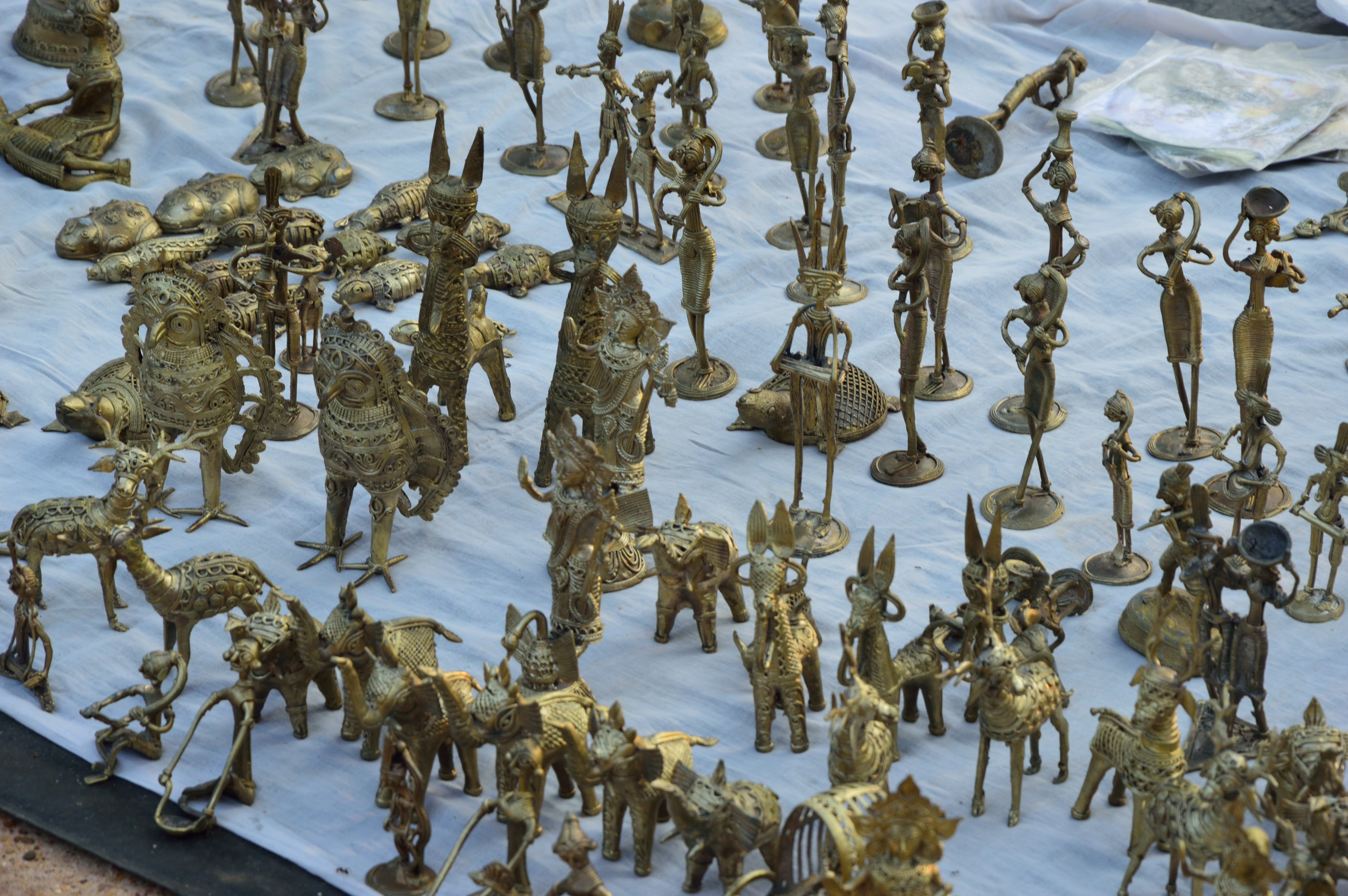
Dhokra craft on sale at Saturday Haat at Sonajhuri, near Santiniketan

Provash Sen, a former director of the Regional Design Centre at Kolkata of the All India Handicrafts Board, contributed substantially to the appreciation and improvement in the status of the dhokra craftsmen. In 1966, Sambhunath Karmakar received a national award from Dr. Sarvepalli Radhakrishnan, President of India, for his creation “Rath”. In 1971, Baikuntha Karmakar received a national award from V.V. Giri, President of India, for his creation “horse”. In 1986, Haradhan Karmakar received a national award from Gyani Zail Singh, President of India, for his creation “Laksmisaj”. In 1987, Matar Karmakar, then working at the Kolkata Design Centre, received the President’s Award and a cash reward of Rs. 10,000 from R. Venkataraman, President of India. In 1990, Haradhan Karmakar and Mahamaya Karmakar were sent to Small Scale Industries Centre at London for an exhibition of dhokra craft.

In a report by the Micro, Small and Medium Industries Development Institute, it says that the degree of excellence of products like, sola craft of Bankapasi and dhokra of Dwariapur is now acceptable to European markets.

An organization named NISTADS got involved in developing a new furnace for Dhokra artisans. The clash of modernity and traditions had its own problems. However, the modern furnace has found acceptance at both Dwaraipur and Bikna, some two hours by road, in Bankura district, another place where around 36 families are involved in the dhokra craft.

== Transport ==
State Highway 14, running from Dubrajpur (in Birbhum district) to Betai (in Nadia district), passes through Dwariapur.
