= Ramnabagan Wildlife Sanctuary =

Wildlife sanctuary in West Bengal, India

Coordinates: 23.253°N 87.851°E

- IUCN category IV (habitat/species management area)
- Location within West Bengal Location within India
- Interactive map of Ramnabagan Wildlife Sanctuary
- Location: Burdwan, district, West Bengal, India
- Area: 0.15 km^{2} (0.058 sq mi)
- Established: 1981

Ramnabagan Wildlife Sanctuary is in Bardhaman, West Bengal, India. The animals found include spotted deer and common langur.

Ramnabagan Mini Zoo in the Ramnabagan Wildlife Sanctuary spread over an area of 14.31 hectares is in Mouza Baburbag in Burdwan. This forest patch is under the control of Divisional Forest Officer, Burdwan Division who acts as Ex-Officio Director of the Zoo. The area was declared as reserved forest in 1960.

In 1978, the area had been converted to a deer park with the introduction of six spotted deer. Subsequently, the whole area has been declared a wildlife sanctuary. Later on, subsequently a mini-Zoo was approved by Central Zoo Authority within the Wildlife Sanctuary area. This Zoo has been renamed as Bardhaman Zoological Park, and it has been recognized as a Small Category Zoo.

Ramnabagan forest has tall teak and sal forest, as well as kadbels (Limonia acidissima), demur (Ficus racemosa), jam (Syzygium cumini).

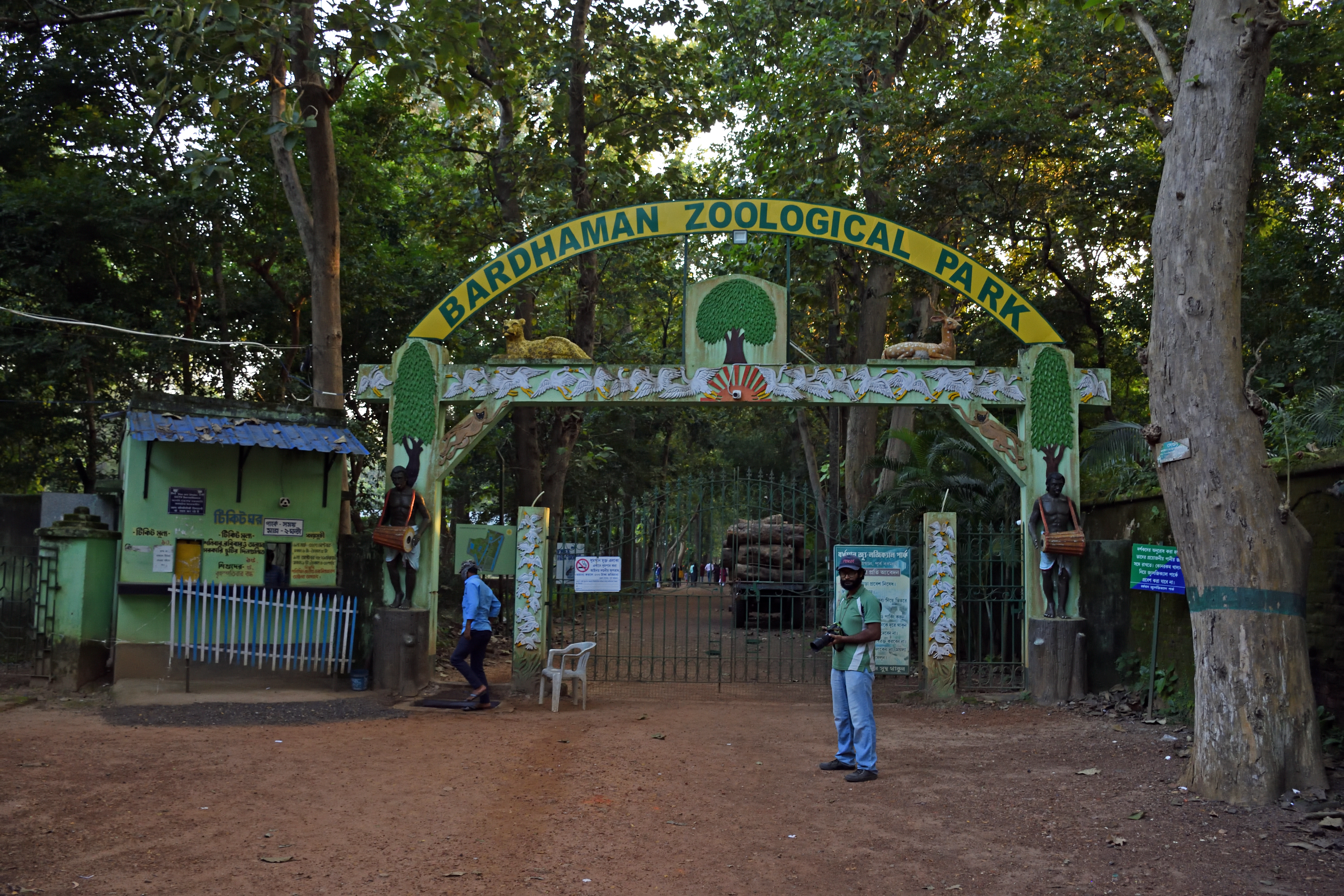
Ramnabagan Wildlife Sanctuary entrance

== Attractions and activities ==
Chital and barking deer were introduced here since its inception in 1978. The present population of chital (spotted deer) is quite high.

Besides these, the wild animals in captivity kept in the zoo are leopard, sloth bear, saltwater crocodile, peafowl, adjutant stork, emu, porcupine, golden pheasant, silver pheasant, red jungle fowl, box turtle, star turtle, barking deer, sambar deer, rhesus macaque, etc.

Free-living birds and animals are also present in the forest sanctuary area. Common langurs are abundant in the zoo area, storks, snakes, mongooses, and birds like martins, parakeets, cuckoos, owls and spotted doves can be seen in the sanctuary zoo area.

In recent time, many new developments have been done in the Zoo including erection of new spacious enclosures for animals. A Nature Interpretation Centre has also been built for Children's knowledge and interest.

== Transport ==
The area is in the municipal limits of Burdwan town and is about 3 km from Burdwan Railway station to the west. It is about 4 km from G.T. Road (N.H.2) on Burdwan-Durgapur stretch of Durgapur Expressway. It is well connected with G.T Road by Sukumar Sen Road that meets G.T Road at Golapbag crossing. There is a good network of approach roads all along the periphery of the zoo.

Burdwan is well connected with all the major junctions of Eastern Railway. Local trains ply between Howrah and Burdwan at regular intervals. One can also avail buses which run frequently from all the major bus terminals at Kolkata.
