= Guskara =

- Town
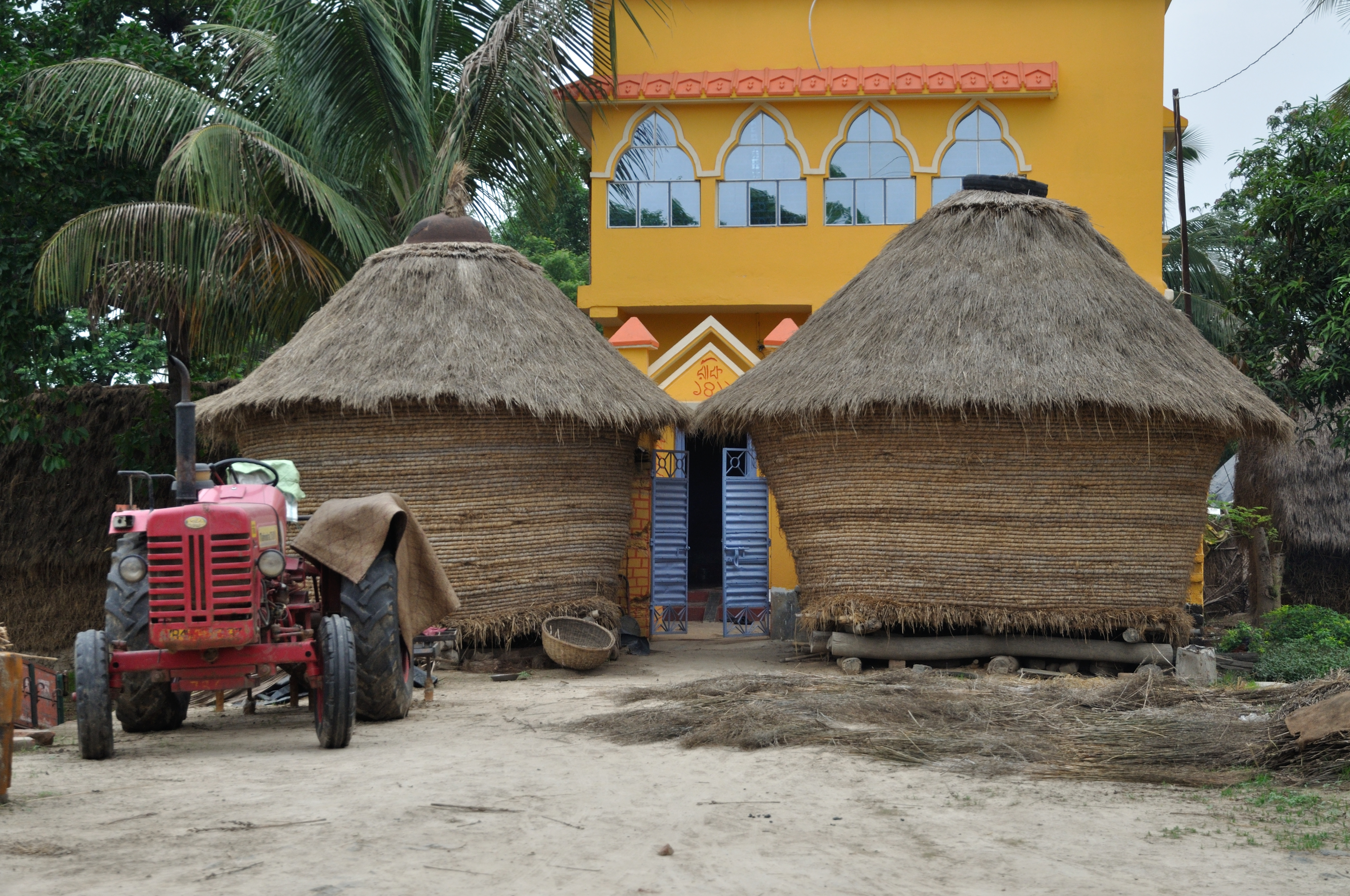
- Traditional arrangement for stocking rice

- Location in West Bengal, India Guskara (India)
- Coordinates: 23.50°N 87.75°E
- Country: India
- State: West Bengal
- District: Purba Bardhaman

Government
  - Type: Municipality
  - Body: Guskara Municipality

Area
  - Total: 21.15 km^{2} (8.17 sq mi)
- Elevation: 38 m (125 ft)

Population (2011)
  - Total: 35,888
  - Density: 1,697/km^{2} (4,395/sq mi)

Languages
  - Official: Bengali, English
- Time zone: UTC+5:30 (IST)
- Postal code: 713128
- Vehicle registration: WB42A0000
- Lok Sabha constituency: Bolpur
- Vidhan Sabha constituency: Ausgram
- Website: purbabardhaman.gov.in

Guskara is a town and a municipality under the Ausgram police station in Bardhaman Sadar North subdivision of Purba Bardhaman district in the Indian state of West Bengal.

== History ==
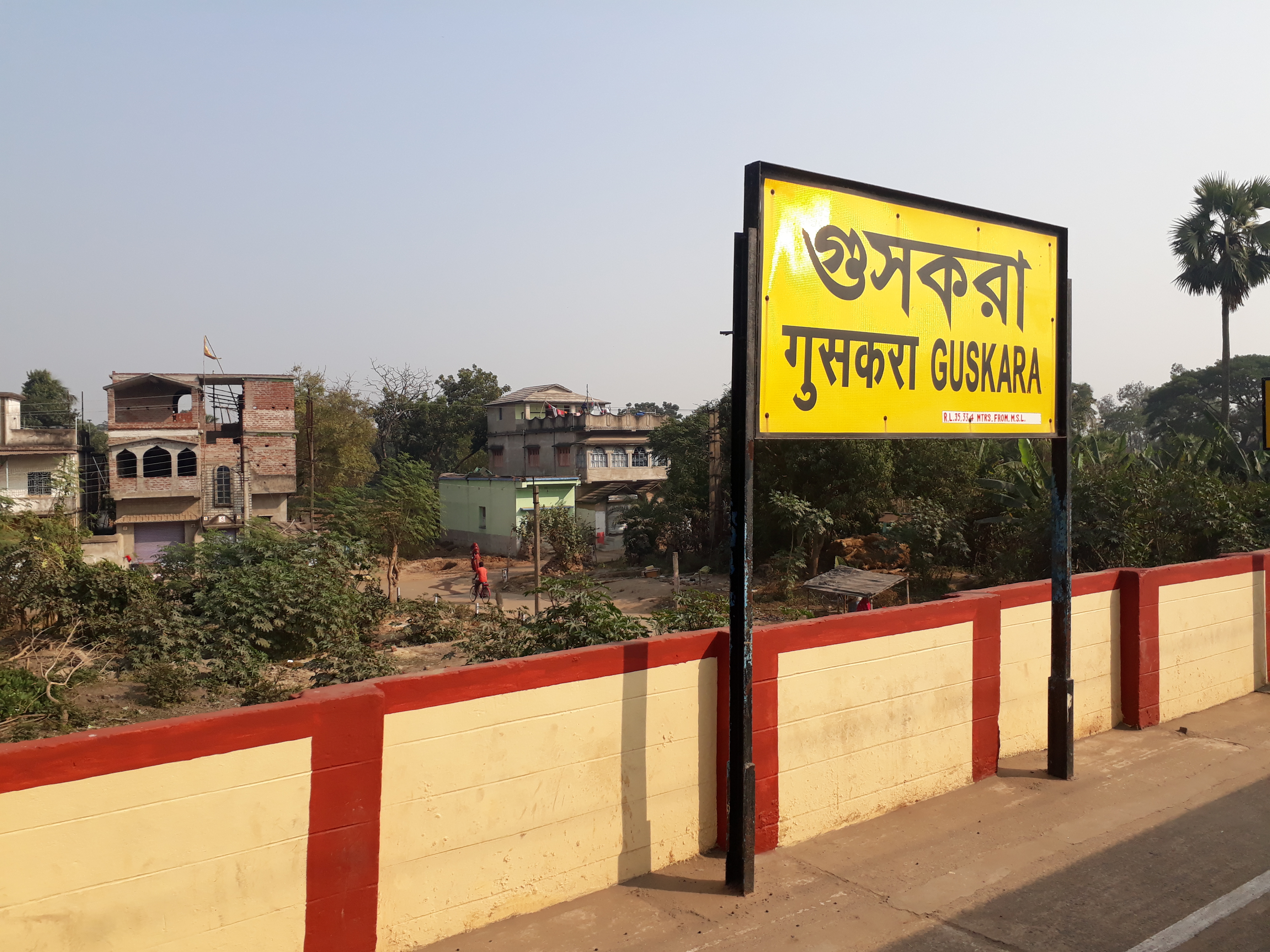
Guskara railway station

The area between the Damodar and Ajay was previously known as Gopbhum.

== Geography ==
Cities and towns in the Bardhaman Sadar North subdivision of Purba Bardhaman district
M: municipal city/ town, CT: census town, R: rural/ urban centre, H: historical site, W: river project, C: craft centre
Owing to space constraints in the small map, the actual locations in a larger map may vary slightly

=== Location ===
Guskara is located at 23.50°N 87.75°E. It has an average elevation of 38 metres (125 feet). Guskara is located in the alluvial flood plains of several rivers. Kunur River flows past it.

=== Urbanisation ===
73.58% of the population of Bardhaman Sadar North subdivision lives in rural areas. Only 26.42% of the population lives in urban areas, and that is the highest proportion of urban population amongst the four subdivisions in Purba Bardhaman district. The map alongside presents some of the notable locations in the subdivision. All places marked in the map are linked in the larger full-screen map.

=== Guskara Airfield ===
Guskara Airfield is a former wartime United States Army Air Forces airfield in India used during the Burma Campaign 1944–1945. Guskara was a photo-recon base for the Tenth Air Force. Several aircraft including Northrop P-61 Black Widow and Lockheed P-38 Lightning operated from this airfield. It is now abandoned.

== Economy ==
Guskara has a wholesale market. The area thrives on brick kilns, woodcraft, and cloth sales. This area depends on the agro-based economy. Potato, Paddy, and Arum are the main agricultural produce of the area. Arum of this area is famous for its taste. Huge amounts of potato and paddy are produced in this area. As fish cultivation and breeding is becoming more popular, fishery is becoming a larger factor within the local economy. Poultry farms are becoming another factor in the growing economy of this area.

== Demographics ==
As per the 2011 Census of India, Guskara had a total population of 35,888, of which 18,573 (51%) were males and 17,315 (49%) were females. Population below 6 years was 3,544. The total number of literates in Guskara was 25,525 (72.13% of the population over 6 years).

As of 2001 India census, Guskara had a population of 31,863. Males constitute 52% of the population and females 48%. Guskara has an average literacy rate of 66%, higher than the national average of 59.5%: male literacy is 72%, and female literacy is 59%. In Guskara, 12% of the population is under 6 years of age.

The steady flow of refugees from East Pakistan increased the population of the area in the fifties. Recently, an influx of people from outskirt villages has further increased the population of the area.

== Education ==
Guskara has sixteen primaries, one upper primary, one secondary, and three higher secondary schools. It also has one college.

Gushkara Mahavidyalaya was established at Guskara in 1955. It offers honors courses in Bengali, Sanskrit, English, history, geography, political science, philosophy, physics, chemistry, mathematics, botany, zoology, nutrition, and B.Com.

Guskara Purnananda Public Institution, a coeducational institution, is affiliated with West Bengal Council of Higher Secondary Education. The school has got a very good academic record. It got President's Medal during the decade of the 1950s and was received by former Head Master of the school Nirod Boron Mahata.

Sushila Jangeswar Public High School, a coeducational institution, is affiliated with West Bengal Council of Higher Secondary Education.

Guskara Balika Vidyalaya is affiliated with West Bengal Council of Higher Secondary Education.

A private polytechnic college was established in 2010 "Gobindapur Sephali Memorial Polytechnic" which is recognized by the West Bengal state council of technical education.

== Art ==
The area is renowned for its dhokra art castings. The craftsmen and craftswomen are very poor. Middlemen buys dokra artifacts from them and sell them in markets. The middlemen earn the profit. The poor craftsmen and women cannot gain much from their produce as they cannot reach prospective markets to sell their products themselves. Moreover, the craftsmen and women usually take loans from the nearby grocery shops for their daily needs of sustenance. The grocery or shop owners take artifacts from the craftsmen and women as a mortgage for loans. The craftsmen and women are unable to repay the loan. So, the mortgage items become the items of sale in the grocery or shop owners. The last but not the least of the problem that has beset the craftsmen and women is the lack of health and sanitary consciousness.

== Transport ==
=== Train ===
Guskara (station code-GKH) is well connected with Bardhaman, Howrah, and Sealdah station on down line and Bolpur, Rampurhat, Malda Town and New Jalpaiguri on up line by train. 20 pairs of train run through Guskara railway station every day. It is a part of the Sahibganj Loop of Eastern Railway. It consists of two platforms and has features like waiting room, pay and use washroom and one station one product stall.

=== Road ===
National Highway named NH114 (previously named as NH2B) passes through which connects Bardhaman and Kolkata on the south, Bolpur and Rampurhat on the north. Another State Highway named SH14 is also going through Guskara which connects Mankar and Durgapur on the west, Balgona and Katwa on the east.

=== Bus ===
One bus-depot (Guskara Bus Stand) is here. Many buses of different routes go from here. The common routes are Guskara-Bardhaman (mainly via Orgram and some via Galsi), Guskara-Asansol (via Mankar), Guskara-Durgapur (via Mankar), Guskara-Katwa (mainly via Balgona and some via Natunhat) and Guskara-Bolpur.

=== E-Rickshaw ===
There are many toto (e-rickshaw) which are convenient and affordable for intra-town transport.

=== Rented Taxis ===
There are rented taxi available without prior booking at taxi stand at Guskara railway station (beside platform 1). It is useful for personalized destination.
