= Ausgram Assembly constituency =

West Bengal Legislative Assembly constituency

Ausgram
- Constituency No. 273 for the West Bengal Legislative Assembly
- Interactive Map Outlining Ausgram Assembly Constituency

Constituency details
- Country: India
- Region: East India
- State: West Bengal
- District: Purba Bardhaman
- Lok Sabha constituency: Bolpur
- Established: 1951
- Total electors: 195,953
- Reservation: SC

Member of Legislative Assembly
- 18th West Bengal Legislative Assembly
- Incumbent Kalita Maji
- Party: BJP
- Alliance: NDA
- Elected year: 2026

Ausgram Assembly constituency is an assembly constituency in Purba Bardhaman district in the Indian state of West Bengal. It is reserved for Scheduled Castes (SC).

== Overview ==
As per orders of the Delimitation Commission, No. 273 Ausgram (SC) assembly seat covers Ausgram I and Ausgram II CD Blocks, and Guskara municipality.

Ausgram assembly segment is part of No. 41 Bolpur Lok Sabha constituency

== Members of the Legislative Assembly ==
Year	Member	Party
1951	Kanai Lal Das	Indian National Congress
1951	Ananda Gopal Mukhopadhyay	Indian National Congress
1957	Kanai Lal Das	Indian National Congress
1962	Manoranjan Bakshi	Independent politician
1967	Krishna Chandra Halder	Communist Party of India (Marxist)
1969	Krishna Chandra Halder	Communist Party of India (Marxist)
1971	Sridhar Malik	Communist Party of India (Marxist)
1972	Sridhar Malik	Communist Party of India (Marxist)
1977	Sridhar Malik	Communist Party of India (Marxist)
1982	Sridhar Malik	Communist Party of India (Marxist)
1987	Sreedhar Malik	Communist Party of India (Marxist)
1991	Sreedhar Malik	Communist Party of India (Marxist)
1996	Kartick Chandra Bag	Communist Party of India (Marxist)
2001	Kartick Chandra Bag	Communist Party of India (Marxist)
2006	Kartick Chandra Bag	Communist Party of India (Marxist)
2011	Basudeb Mete	Communist Party of India (Marxist)
2016	Abhedananda Thander	Trinamool Congress
2021	Abhedananda Thander	Trinamool Congress
2026	Kalita Maji	Bharatiya Janata Party

== Election results ==
Vote share of Winning candidates
2026	47.68%
2021	46.25%
2016	45.94%
2011	52.21%
2006	66.28%
2001	64.53%
1996	66.19%
1991	63.37%
1987	69.91%
1982	67.42%
1977	67.49%
1972	50.34%
1971	56.13%
1969	60.12%
1967	51.89%
1962	30.94%
1957	45.16%
1952 (Seat-1)	26.00%
1952 (Seat-2)	24.00%

=== 2026 ===
2026 West Bengal Legislative Assembly election: Ausgram
Party	Candidate	Votes	%	±%
BJP	Kalita Maji	107,692	47.68	▲6.88
AITC	Shyama Prasanna Lohar	95,157	42.13	▼4.12
CPI(M)	Chanchal Kumar Majhi	16,478	7.29	▼2.11
INC	Tapas Baral	2,082	0.92	
NOTA	None of the above	2,425	1.07	▼0.79
Majority		12,535	5.55	▲0.1
Turnout		225,886	95.66	▲7.76
BJP gain from AITC		Swing		

=== 2021 ===
2021 West Bengal Legislative Assembly election: Ausgram
Party	Candidate	Votes	%	±%
AITC	Abhedananda Thander	100,392	46.25	▲0.31
BJP	Kalita Maji	88,577	40.80	▲33.34
CPI(M)	Chanchal Kumar Majhi	20,399	9.40	▼33.36
NOTA	None of the above	4,039	1.86	▼0.08
SUCI(C)	Manasa Mete	1,972	0.91	▲0.16
BSP	Sridam Goldar	1,701	0.78	
Majority		11,815	5.45	▲2.27
Turnout		217,080	87.90	▲0.38
AITC hold		Swing		

=== 2016 ===
2016 West Bengal Legislative Assembly election: Ausgram
Party	Candidate	Votes	%	±%
AITC	Abhedananda Thander	90,450	45.94	
CPI(M)	Basudev Mete	84,198	42.76	▼9.45
BJP	Sanatan Maji	14,686	7.46	▲3.06
NOTA	None of the above	3,817	1.94	
IND	Kalpana Ankure	2,263	1.15	
SUCI(C)	Manasa Mete	1,485	0.75	▼0.58
Majority		6,252	3.18	▼10.09
Turnout		196,899	87.52	▼1.18
AITC gain from CPI(M)		Swing		

=== 2011 ===
2011 West Bengal Legislative Assembly election: Ausgram
Party	Candidate	Votes	%	±%
CPI(M)	Basudev Mete	90,863	52.21	▼14.07
INC	Chanchal Kumar Mondal	67,767	38.94	▲30.43
BJP	Santi Karmakar	7,663	4.40	
IND	Nihar Kumar Hazra	3,989	2.29	
SUCI(C)	Manasa Mate	2,321	1.33	
JDP	Bireswar Maji	1,445	0.83	
Majority		23,096	13.27	▼33.00
Turnout		174,048	88.70	▲6.22
CPI(M) hold		Swing		

=== 2006 ===
2006 West Bengal Legislative Assembly election: Ausgram
Party	Candidate	Votes	%	±%
CPI(M)	Kartick Chandra Bag	85,952	66.28	▲1.75
AITC	Chhaya Chowdhury	25,956	20.01	▼8.44
INC	Chanchal Mondal	11,032	8.51	
IND	3 Independent Candidates	6,745	5.10	
Majority		59,996	46.27	▲10.19
Turnout		1,29,685	82.48	▲4.06
CPI(M) hold		Swing		

=== 2001 ===
2001 West Bengal Legislative Assembly election: Ausgram
Party	Candidate	Votes	%	±%
CPI(M)	Kartick Chandra Bag	81,640	64.53	▼1.66
AITC	Sukumar Mondal	35,988	28.45	
BJP	Bijoy Hazra	8,888	7.03	▲0.85
Majority		45,652	36.08	▼3.40
Turnout		1,26,522	78.42	▼7.11
CPI(M) hold		Swing		

=== 1996 ===
1996 West Bengal Legislative Assembly election: Ausgram
Party	Candidate	Votes	%	±%
CPI(M)	Kartick Chandra Bag	81,278	66.19	▲2.82
INC	Sukumar Saha	32,797	26.71	▲2.49
BJP	Sailen Mazumdar	7,588	6.18	▼4.11
SS	Asoke Maji	850	0.69	
IND	Sridhar Majhi	284	0.23	
Majority		48,481	39.48	▲0.33
Turnout		1,25,166	85.53	▲8.81
CPI(M) hold		Swing		

=== 1991 ===
1991 West Bengal Legislative Assembly election: Ausgram
Party	Candidate	Votes	%	±%
CPI(M)	Sreedhar Malik	67,259	63.37	▼6.54
INC	Chhaya Rani Chowdhury	25,707	24.22	▲0.47
BJP	Asoke Majhi	10,917	10.29	
IND	Shridhar Maghi	1,573	1.48	
BSP	Narayan Ch. Biswas	688	0.65	
Majority		41,552	39.15	▼7.01
Turnout		1,08,542	76.72	▼0.07
CPI(M) hold		Swing		

=== 1987 ===
1987 West Bengal Legislative Assembly election: Ausgram
Party	Candidate	Votes	%	±%
CPI(M)	Sridhar Malik	65,611	69.91	▲2.49
INC	Biswambhar Mondal	22,285	23.75	▼7.51
IND	Nihar Hazra	5,948	6.34	
Majority		43,326	46.16	▲10.00
Turnout		95,266	76.79	▼4.87
CPI(M) hold		Swing		

=== 1982 ===
1982 West Bengal Legislative Assembly election: Ausgram
Party	Candidate	Votes	%	±%
CPI(M)	Sreedhar Malik	53,274	67.42	▼0.07
INC	Chanchal Kumar Mondal	24,705	31.26	▲17.01
JP	Narapati Bouri	1,043	1.32	▼16.94
Majority		28,569	36.16	▼13.07
Turnout		80,859	81.66	▲23.05
CPI(M) hold		Swing		

=== 1977 ===
1977 West Bengal Legislative Assembly election: Ausgram
Party	Candidate	Votes	%	±%
CPI(M)	Shreedhar Malik	33,427	67.49	▲17.15
JP	Madan Lohar	9,044	18.26	
INC	Annada Prosad Dhara	7,055	14.25	▼35.41
Majority		24,383	49.23	▲48.55
Turnout		50,595	58.61	▲0.30
CPI(M) hold		Swing		

=== 1972 ===
1972 West Bengal Legislative Assembly election: Ausgram
Party	Candidate	Votes	%	±%
CPI(M)	Sridhar Malik	24,021	50.34	▼5.79
INC	Bans Dhar Saha	23,692	49.66	
Majority		329	0.68	▼20.23
Turnout		49,123	58.31	▼5.95
CPI(M) hold		Swing		

=== 1971 ===
1971 West Bengal Legislative Assembly election: Ausgram
Party	Candidate	Votes	%	±%
CPI(M)	Sridhar Malik	28,445	56.13	▼3.99
BAC	Bansidhar Saha	17,849	35.22	
CPI	Roidas Bamapada	3,704	7.31	
INC(O)	Das Nabakumar	680	1.34	
Majority		10,596	20.91	▼3.59
Turnout		53,293	64.26	▲8.28
CPI(M) hold		Swing		

=== 1969 ===
1969 West Bengal Legislative Assembly election: Ausgram
Party	Candidate	Votes	%	±%
CPI(M)	Krishna Chandra Halder	24,736	60.12	▲8.23
INC	Sankar Das	14,654	35.62	▼3.15
PML	Balai Dhibar	1,755	4.27	
Majority		10,082	24.50	▲11.38
Turnout		42,544	55.98	▲6.36
CPI(M) hold		Swing		

=== 1967 ===
1967 West Bengal Legislative Assembly election: Ausgram
Party	Candidate	Votes	%	±%
CPI(M)	K. C. Halder	17,934	51.89	
INC	K. L. Das	13,401	38.77	▲9.85
IND	B. N. Saha	3,229	9.34	
Majority		4,533	13.12	▲11.10
Turnout		37,103	49.62	▲6.67
CPI(M) gain from Independent		Swing		

=== 1962 ===
1962 West Bengal Legislative Assembly election: Ausgram
Party	Candidate	Votes	%	±%
IND	Monoranjan Baksi	8,700	30.94	
INC	Labanya Gopal Ghatak	8,131	28.92	▼16.24
IND	Anuja Gopal Chattopadhya	6,337	22.54	
AIFB	Debranjan Sen	4,324	15.38	
IND	Nirada Prasad Mukhopadhya	626	2.23	
Majority		569	2.02	▼15.20
Turnout		30,818	42.95	▲4.69
Independent gain from INC		Swing		

=== 1957 ===
1957 West Bengal Legislative Assembly election: Ausgram
Party	Candidate	Votes	%	±%
INC	Kanailal Das	10,403	45.16	
IND	Anuja Kumar Chattapashya	6,435	27.94	
FBM	Dhirendra Nath Roy	4,843	21.02	
IND	Nirodaprasad Mukhopadhya	1,354	5.88	
Majority		3,968	17.22	
Turnout		23,035	38.26	
INC hold		Swing		

=== 1952 ===
1952 West Bengal Legislative Assembly election: Ausgram (2 seats)
Party	Candidate	Votes	%	±%
INC	Kanai Lal Das	17,693	26.00	
INC	Ananda Gopal Mukhepadhyay	16,335	24.00	
MFB	Dhirendra Nath Roy	6,568	9.65	
IND	Anuja Kumar Chattopadhyay	5,203	7.65	
KMPP	Parul Bala Debi	4,045	5.94	
IND	Nirada Prosad Mukhopadhyay	3,333	4.90	
KMPP	Atul Chandra Saha	3,332	4.90	
IND	Dalgobinda Saha	3,257	4.79	
ABJS	Gurugati Roy Chaudhury	2,621	3.85	
IND	Nani Gopal Banerjee	2,460	3.61	
IND	Ashutosh Chattopadhyay	1,620	2.38	
IND	Kali Pada Show	615	0.90	
FB(RG)	Jagatpati Nandi	497	0.73	
IND	Ehabasaran Sarkar	476	0.70	
Majority		1,358	2.00	
Turnout		68,055	63.32	
INC win (new seat)				
