= Dhokra =

Metal casting technique from India

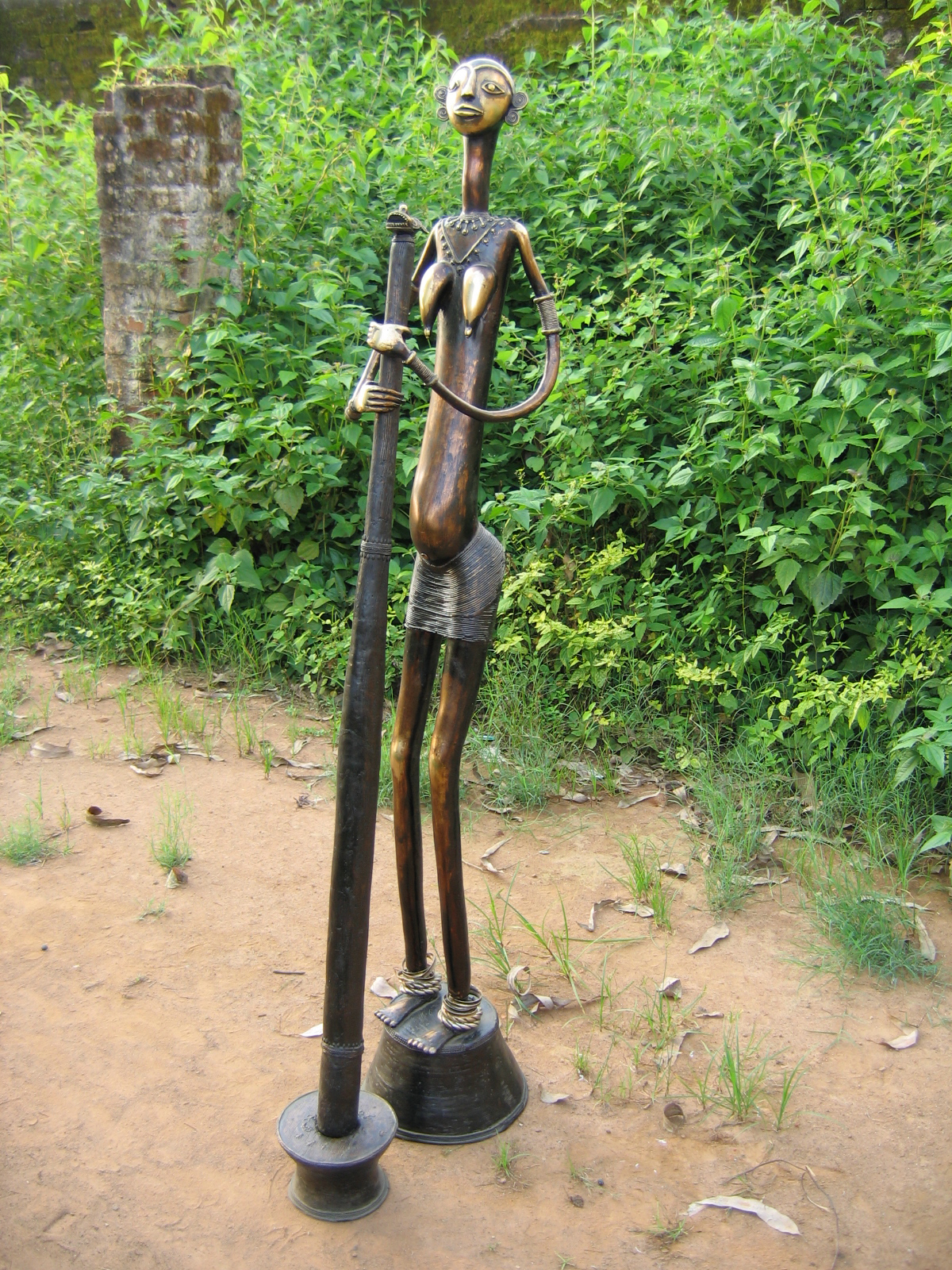
Mother grinding ants for her family

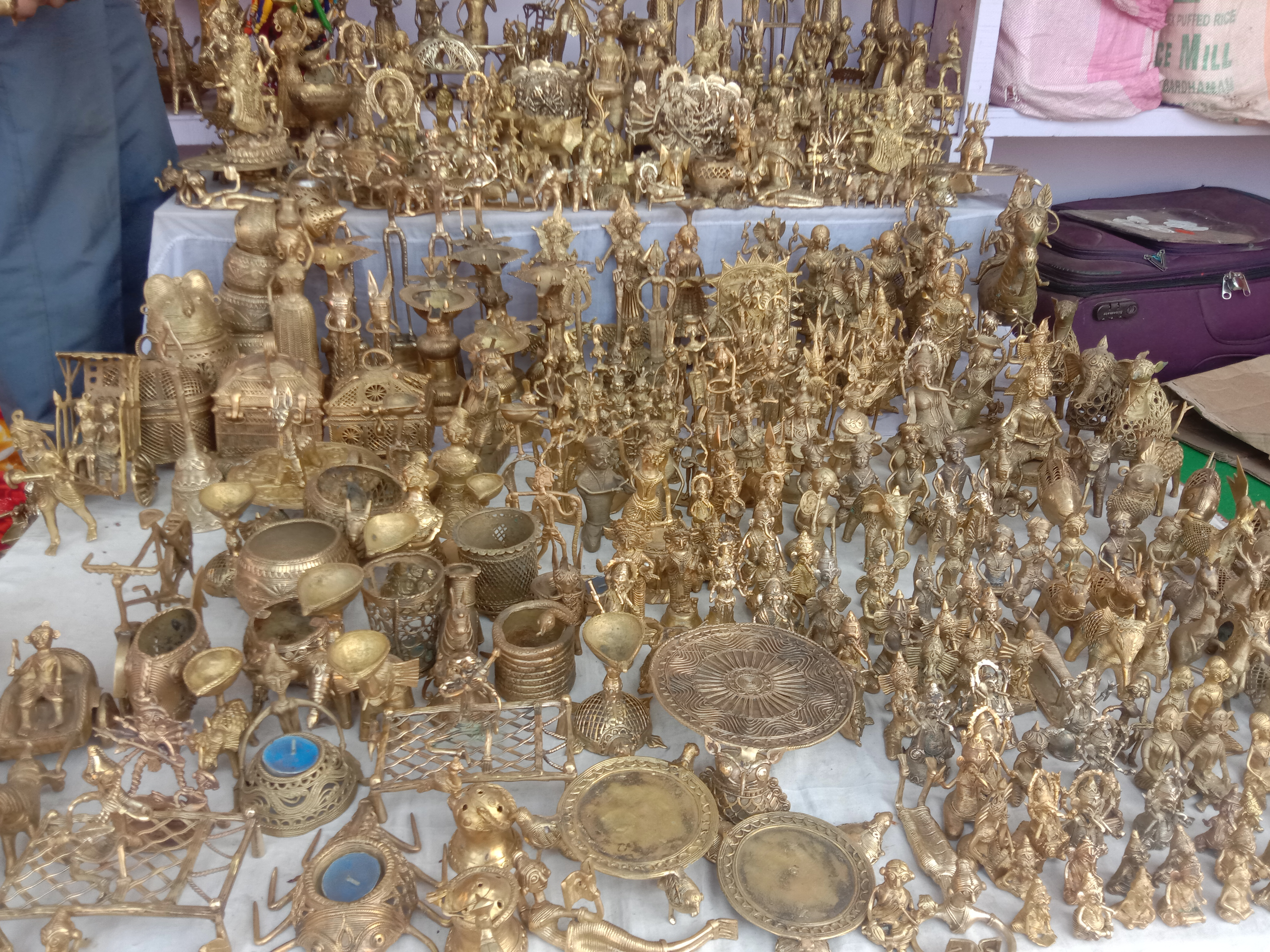
'Dokra' items for sale at the West Bengal State Handicrafts' Fair in New Town, Kolkata.

Dhokra (also spelt Dokra) is non–ferrous metal casting using the lost-wax casting technique. This sort of metal casting has been used in India for over 4,000 years and is still used. One of the earliest known lost wax artifacts is the dancing girl of Mohenjo-daro. The product of dhokra artisans are in great demand in domestic and foreign markets because of primitive simplicity, enchanting folk motifs and forceful form. Dhokra horses, elephants, peacocks, owls, religious images, measuring bowls, and lamp caskets etc., are highly appreciated. The lost wax technique for casting of copper based alloys has also been found in China, Egypt, Malaysia, Nigeria, Central America, and other places.

== The process ==
There are two main processes of lost wax casting: solid casting and hollow casting. While the former is predominant in the south of India the latter is more common in Central and Eastern India. Solid casting does not use a clay core but instead a solid piece of wax to create the mould; hollow casting is the more traditional method and uses the clay core.

The first task in the lost wax hollow casting process consists of developing a clay core which is roughly the shape of the final cast image. Next, the clay core is covered by a layer of wax composed of pure beeswax, resin from the tree Damara orientalis (more properly Agathis dammara), and nut oil. The wax is then shaped and carved in all its finer details of design and decorations. It is then covered with layers of clay, which takes the negative form of the wax on the inside, thus becoming a mould for the metal that will be poured inside it. Drain ducts are left for the wax, which melts away when the clay is cooked. The wax is then replaced by the molten metal, often using brass scrap as basic raw material. The liquid metal poured in hardens between the core and the inner surface of the mould. The metal fills the mould and takes the same shape as the wax. The outer layer of clay is then chipped off and the metal icon is polished and finished as desired.

== The name ==
Dhokra Damar tribes are the main traditional metalsmiths of Odisha and West Bengal. Their technique of lost wax casting is named after their tribe, hence Dhokra metal casting. The tribe extends from Jharkhand to West Bengal and Odisha; members are distant cousins of the Chhattisgarh Dhokras. A few hundred years ago, the Dhokras of Central and Eastern India traveled south as far as Tamilnadu and north as far as Rajasthan and hence are now found all over India. Dhokra, or Dokra from Dwariapur and Bikna, West Bengal, is extremely popular. Recently Adilabad Dokra from Telangana got Geographical Indicator tag in 2018.

== Images ==
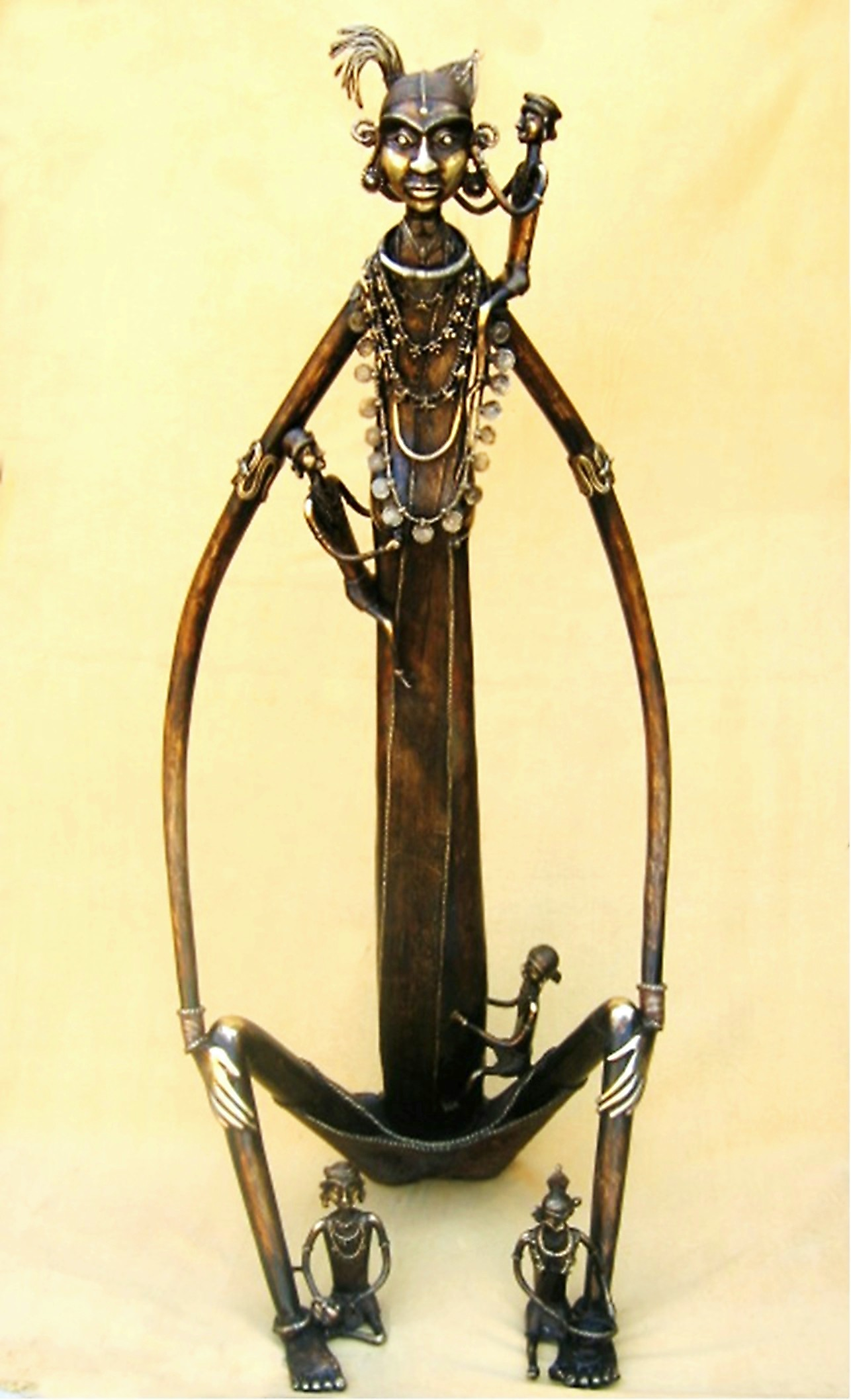
Mother with five children.

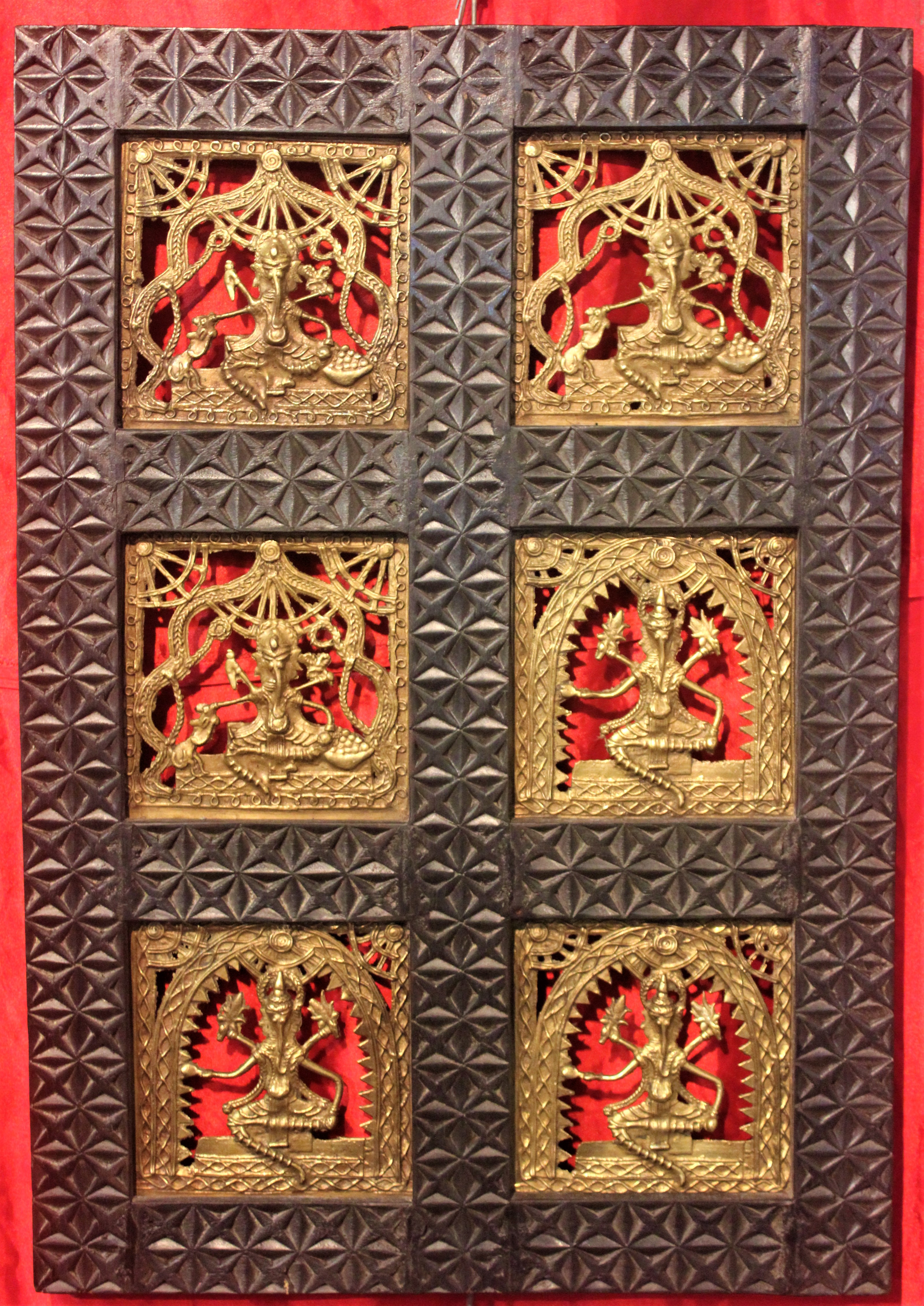
Dhokra displaying Hindu deities.

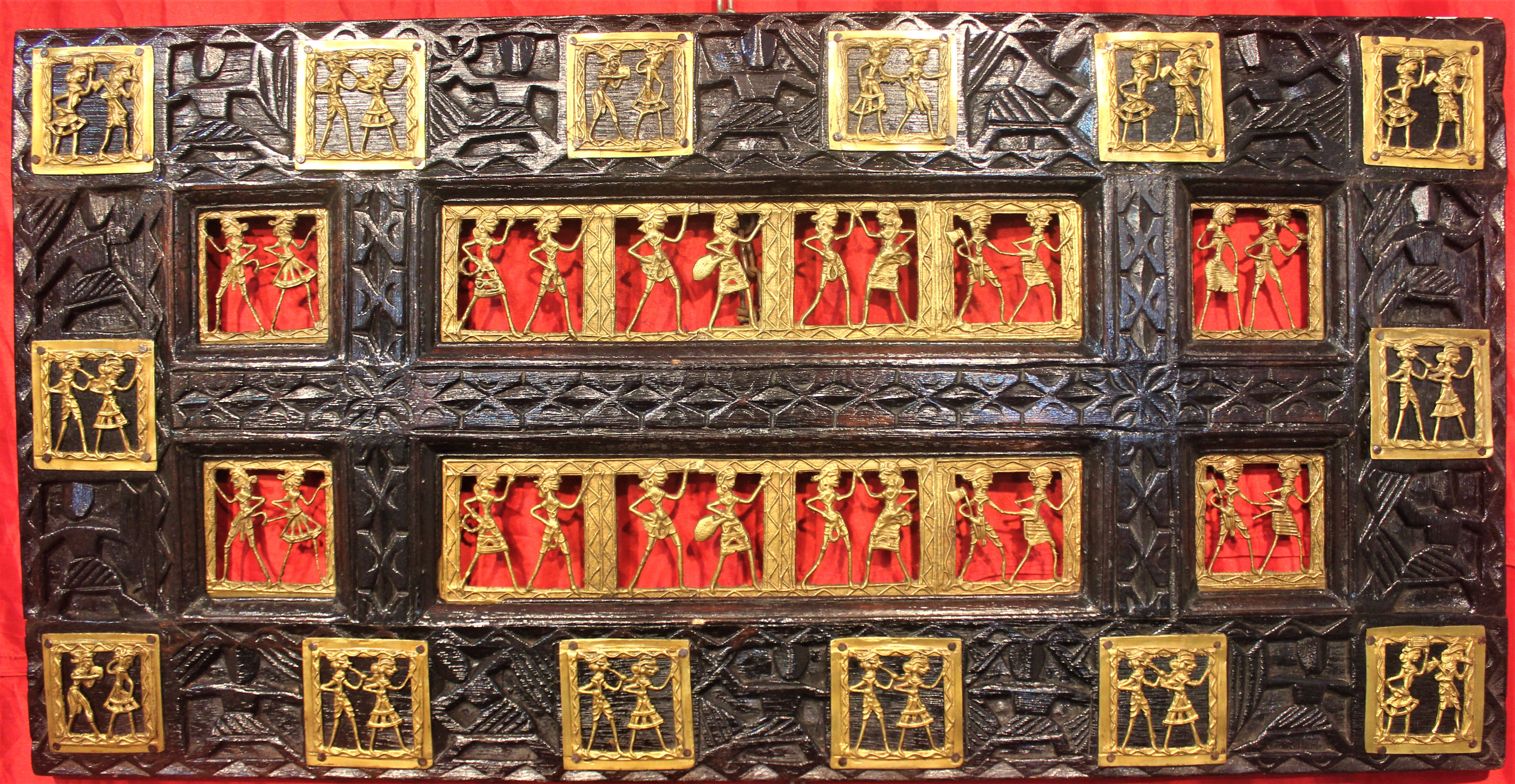
Couple involved in various activities.

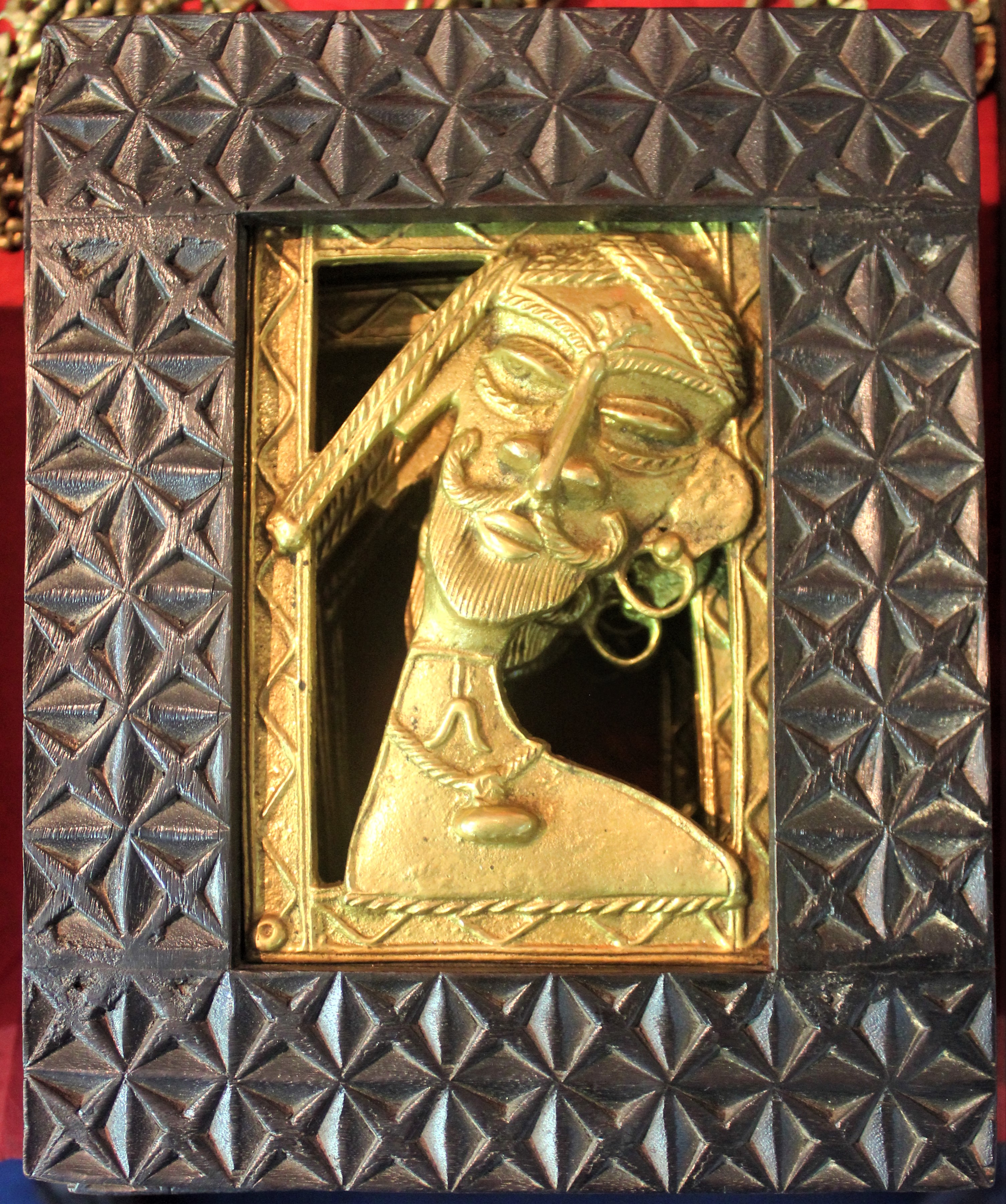
Dhokra featuring man's bust.

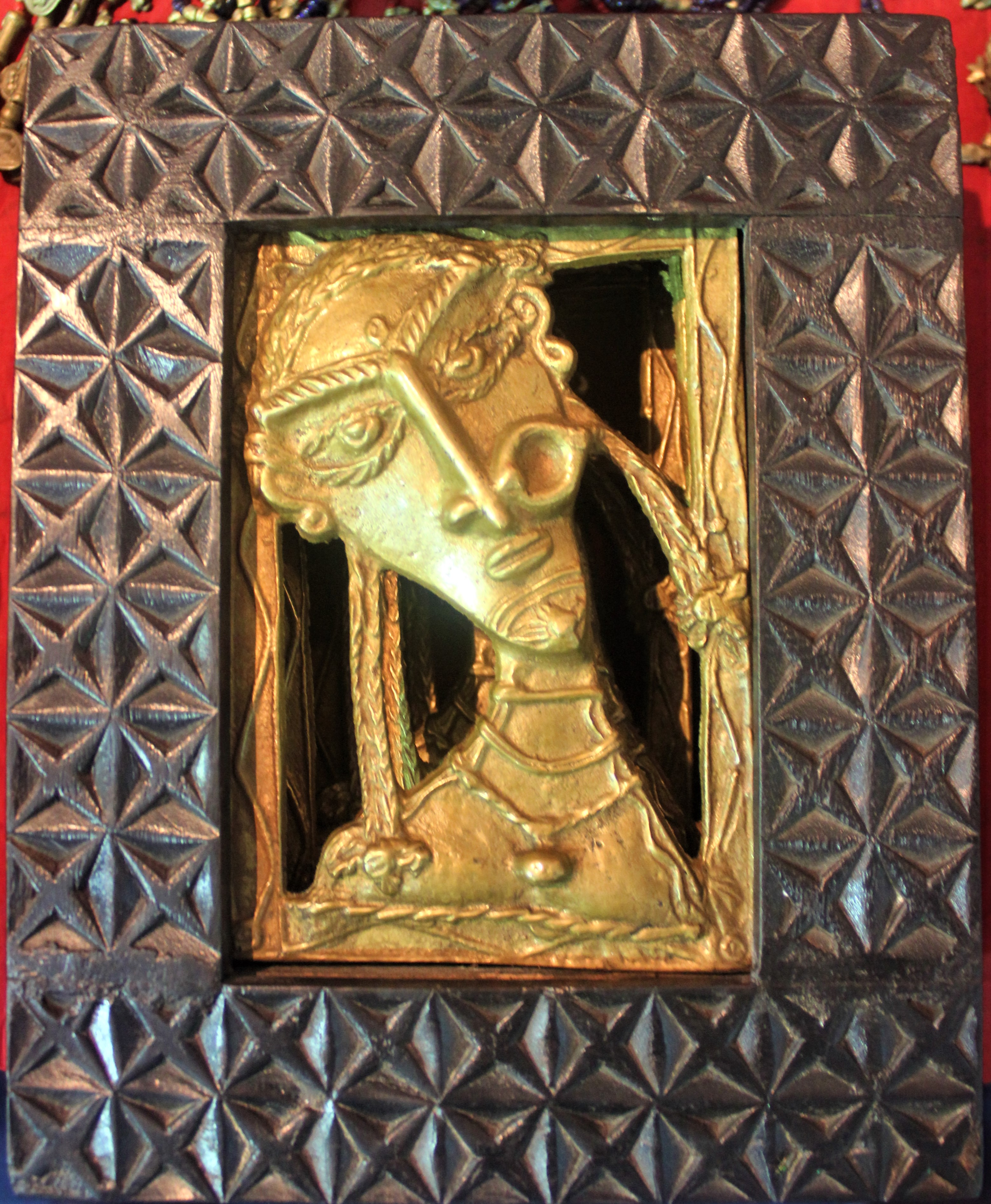
Dhokra featuring woman's bust.
