= Tapan Chatterjee =

Indian politician

Tapan Chatterjee (born 1955) is an Indian politician from West Bengal. He was a member of the West Bengal Legislative Assembly from Purbasthali Uttar Assembly constituency in Purba Bardhaman district. He won the 2021 West Bengal Legislative Assembly election representing the All India Trinamool Congress. He gets arrested on 31st may 2026.

== Early life and education ==
Chatterjee is from Purbasthali, Purba Bardhaman district, West Bengal. He is the son of late Kalipada Chatterjee. He studied Class 12 at Purbasthali Nilmani Brahamchari Institution and passed the examinations conducted by the West Bengal Council of Higher Secondary Education in 1974.

== Career ==
Chatterjee won from Purbasthali Uttar Assembly constituency representing All India Trinamool Congress in the 2021 West Bengal Legislative Assembly election. He polled 92,421 votes and defeated his nearest rival, Gobardhan Das of the Bharatiya Janata Party, by a margin of 6,706 votes. He first became an MLA in the 2011 West Bengal Legislative Assembly election representing the then Purbasthali Assembly constituency.
