= Purbasthali (disambiguation) =

Purbasthali is a village in West Bengal, India.

Purbasthali may also refer to:

- Purbasthali I, a community development block in the Kalna subdivision of West Bengal
- Purbasthali II, a community development block in the Kalna subdivision of West Bengal
- Purbasthali Uttar, a constituency in Vidhan Sabha
- Purbasthali Dakshin, a constituency in Vidhan Sabha
