= Bardhaman district =

Former district in West Bengal, India

Bardhaman
- Former District
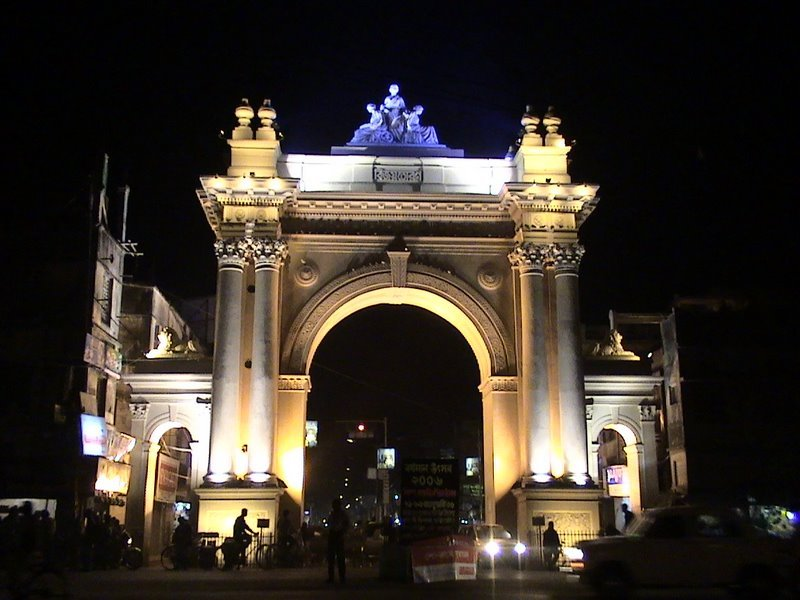
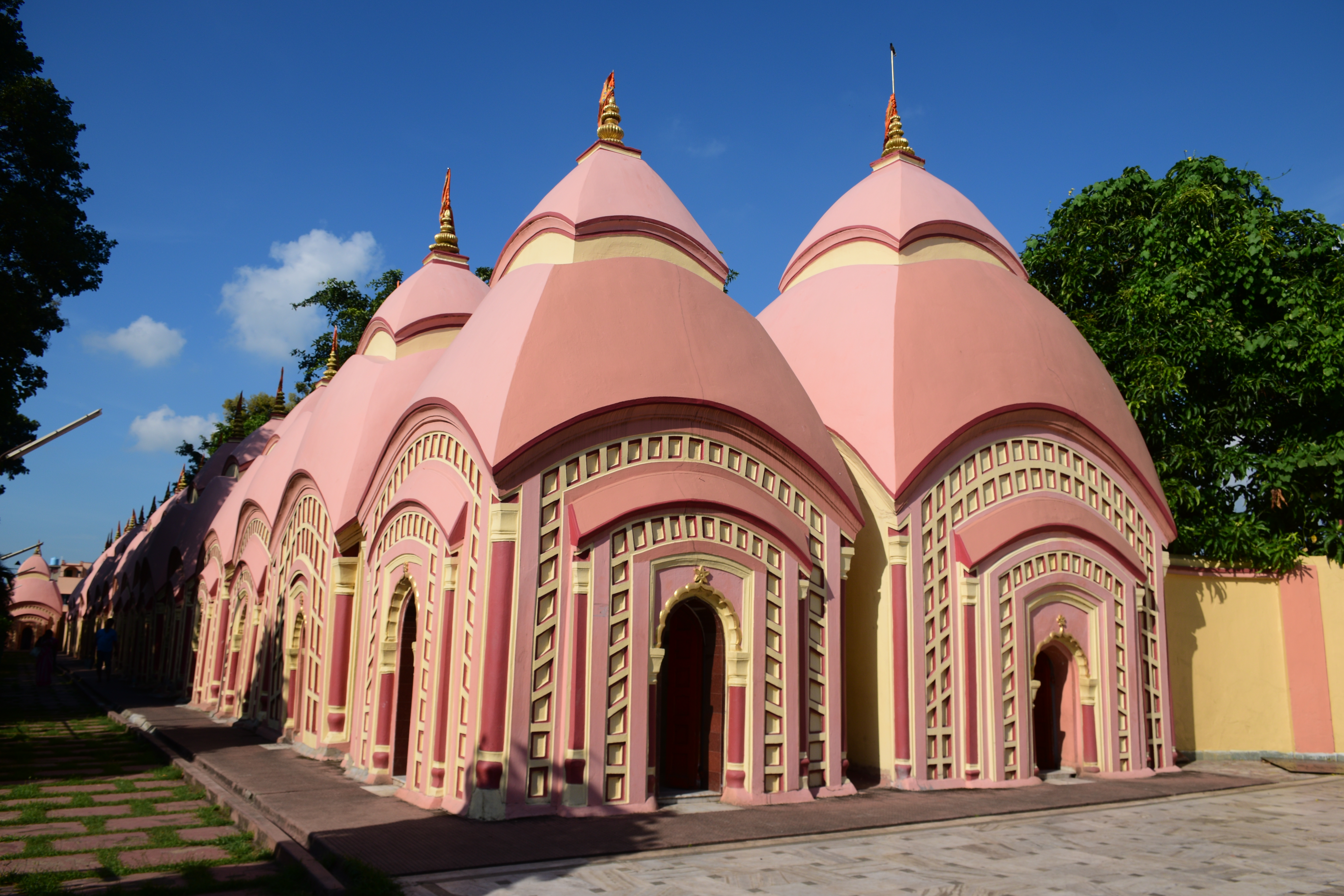
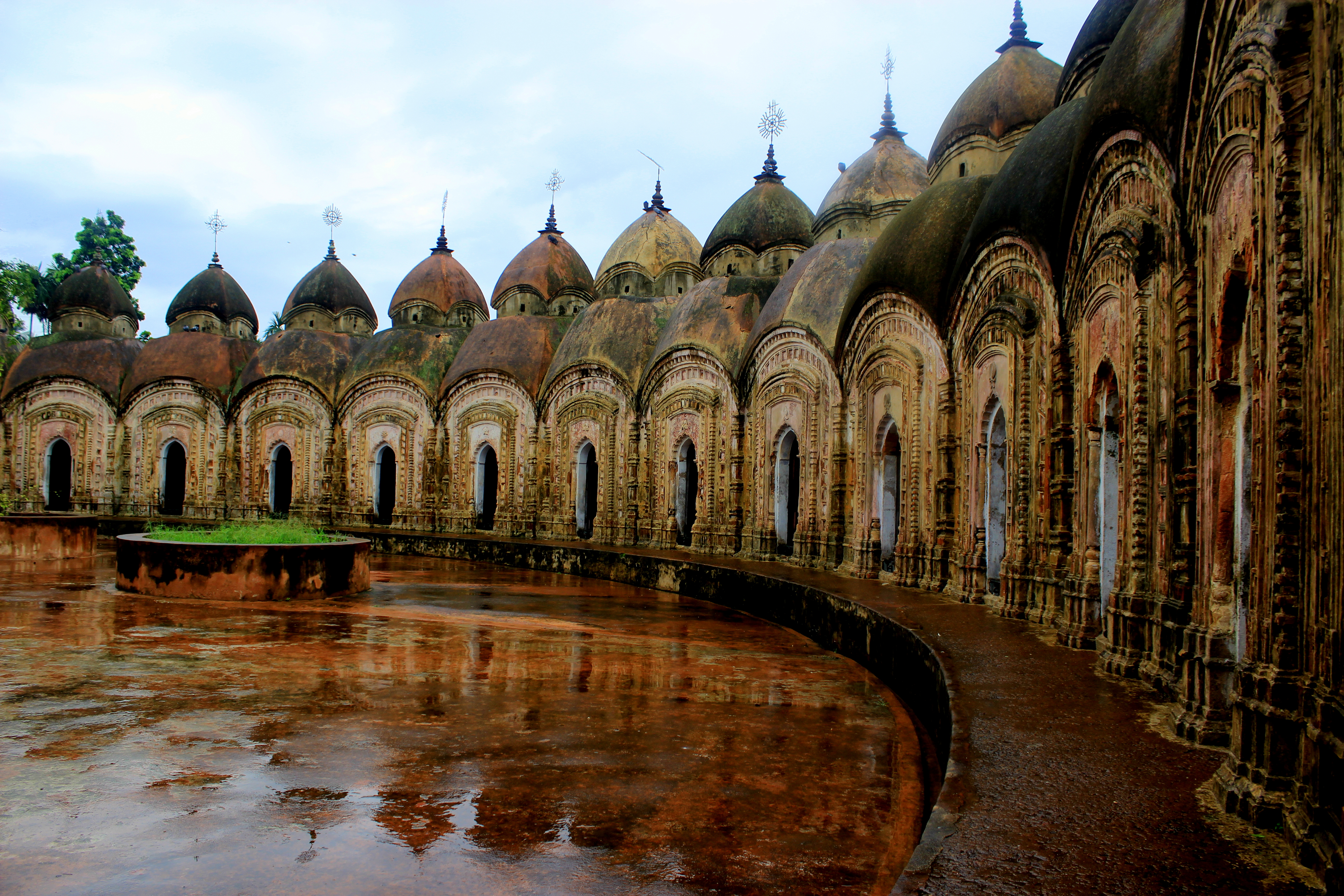
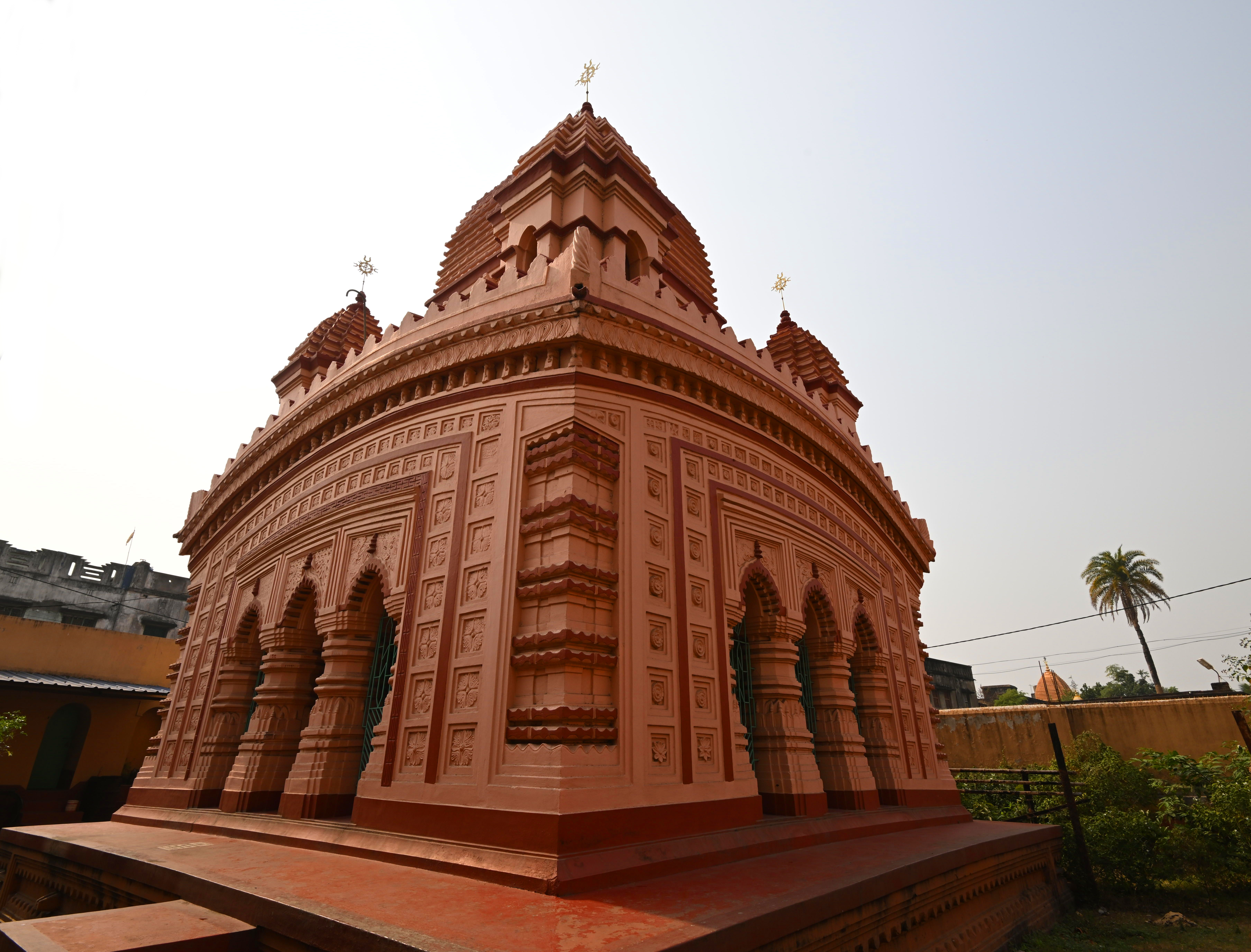
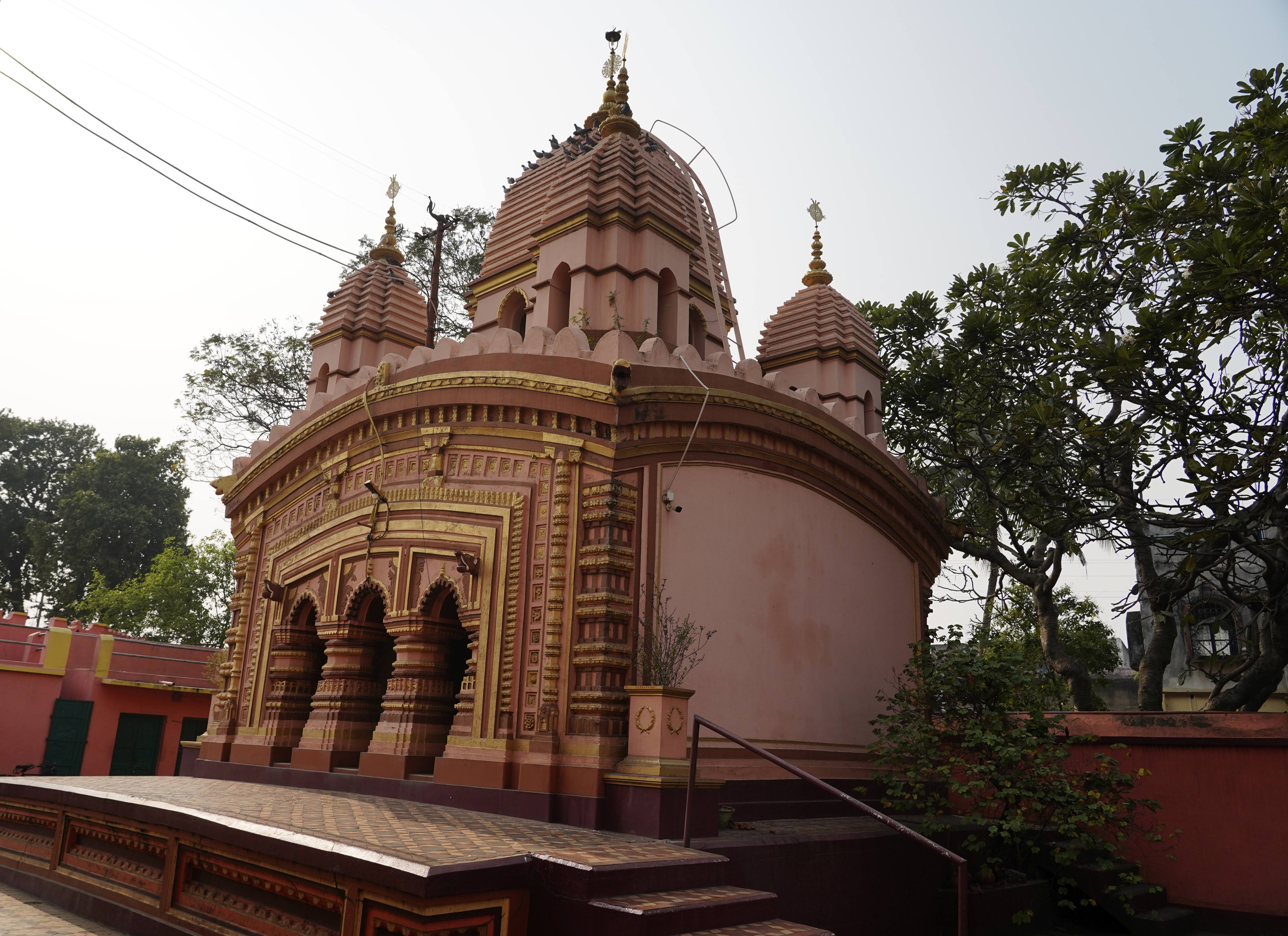
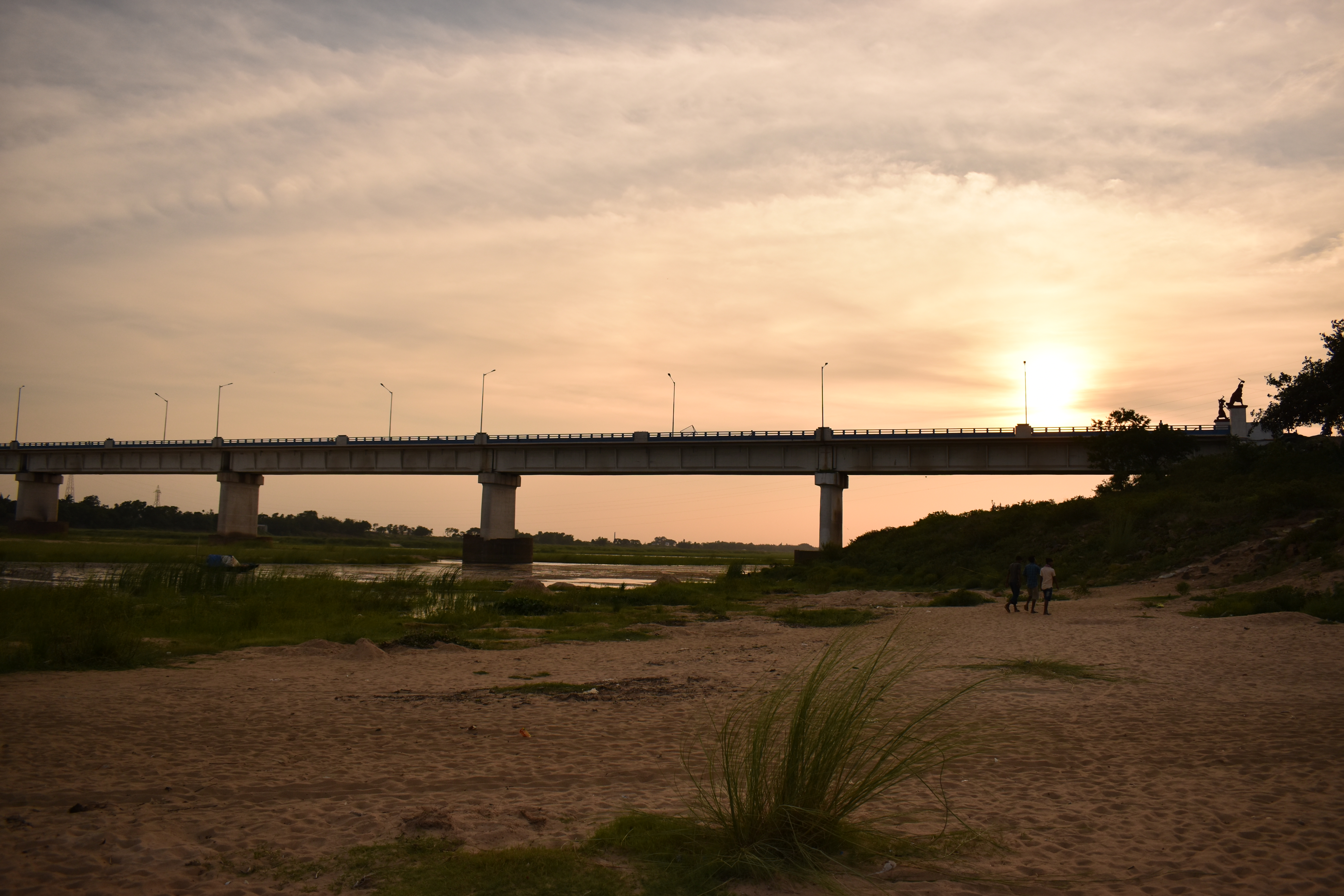
- Clockwise from top: Curzon Gate, Nava Kailash temple at Kalna, Sita-Rama Temple in Ukhra, Damodar River, Radhamadhab Temple in Khandra, 108 Shiva Temple at Nababhat

- Location of Bardhaman district in West Bengal
- Coordinates: 23°22′N 87°58′E
- Country: India
- State: West Bengal
- Division: Burdwan
- Headquarters: Bardhaman

Government
  - Subdivisions: Bardhaman Sadar North, Bardhaman Sadar South, Kalna, Katwa, Asansol, Durgapur
  - CD Blocks: Ausgram I, Ausgram II, Bhatar, Burdwan I, Burdwan II, Galsi I, Galsi II, Khandaghosh, Jamalpur, Memari I, Memari II, Raina I, Raina II, Kalna I, Kalna II, Manteswar, Purbasthali I, Purbasthali II, Katwa I, Katwa II, Ketugram I, Ketugram II, Mongalkote, Salanpur, Barabani, Jamuria, Raniganj, Andal, Pandabeswar, Faridpur-Durgapur, Kanksa
  - Lok Sabha constituencies: Asansol, Bardhaman-Durgapur, Bardhaman Purba, Bishnupur, Bolpur
  - Vidhan Sabha constituencies: Pandaveswar, Raniganj, Jamuria, Asansol Uttar, Asansol Dakshin, Kulti, Barabani, Bardhaman Uttar, Bardhaman Dakshin, Manteswar, Bhatar, Galsi, Durgapur Purba, Durgapur Paschim, Raina, Jamalpur, Kalna, Memari, Purbasthali Uttar, Purbasthali Dakshin, Katwa, Ketugram, Mangalkot, Ausgram, Khandaghosh

Area
  - Total: 7,024 km^{2} (2,712 sq mi)

Population (2011)
  - Total: 7,717,563
  - Density: 1,099/km^{2} (2,846/sq mi)
  - Urban: 3,078,299

Demographics
  - Literacy: 76.21 per cent
  - Sex ratio: 945 ♂/♀

Languages
  - Official: Bengali
  - Additional official: English
- Time zone: UTC+05:30 (IST)
- Website: www.bardhaman.nic.in

Bardhaman (/ˈbɑːrdəˌmən/, Bengali: [ˈbɔrˌdʱoman]), or sometimes Burdwan and Barddhaman, was a former district in the Indian state of West Bengal, headquartered in Bardhaman. On 7 April 2017, the district was bifurcated into two separate districts namely Purba Bardhaman and Paschim Bardhaman. It was the seventh most populous district in India (out of 640) at the time of bifurcation.

== Etymology ==
Historians link the name of the district to the 24th and last Jain Tirthankara, Mahavira Vardhamana, who came to preach in the area. A Jain image is in the collection of Vidyasagar Mandir in the Midnapore town. A Jaina brass plaque has been found from a place very close to Katwa (Burdwan district). Jaina figures of rare artistic quality have been discovered in the place.

Quite a large number of the mutilated sculptures representing Jaina Tirthankara were noticed within the enclosure of the brick temple of Satdeulia in Burdwan district.

== History ==
During the period of Jahangir this place was named Badh-e-dewan (district capital). The city owes its historical importance to being the headquarters of the Maharajas of Burdwan, the premier noblemen of lower Bengal, whose rent-roll was upwards of 300,000. Archaeological excavations/ findings at Pandu Rajar Dhibi and Birbhanpur have indicated settlements in the Ajay and Damodar valleys in the Mesolithic age, around 5,000 BC. Not much is known about the early settlements and the period that followed till around 700 BC in ancient times when the area was referred to as Bardhamanbhukti, which was a part of the Rarh region. It was one of the sixteen janapad (In ancient times, districts were called Janapadas ) of ancient India. Large and powerful empires such as the Magadhas, Mauryas, Kushanas and Guptas held sway over the area and beyond it. In the 7th century AD, the area was part of the Gauda Kingdom, then ruled by Shashanka. It was subsequently ruled by the Palas and Senas, till Bakhtiyar Khilji captured it in 1199 AD.

The early Muslim rulers ruled over major parts of Bengal from Gauda or Lakhnauti. In the Mughal period Bardhaman is mentioned as a mahal or pargana of Sarcar Sharifabad. Some western parts of Bardhaman was Gopbhum, ruled for many years by the Sadgope kings. The Gopbhum area later became part of the Shergarh and Senpahari parganas.

In 1606, Sher Afghan Khan, the jagirdar of Bardhaman, was killed just outside Bardhaman. After Sher Afghan's death, his wife, Meher-un-Nissa, was taken by Jahangir as his consort, and named Nur Jahan. It was one of the most romantic chapters of Mughal history. In 1622, when Jahangir's son, Khurram, who later became Shah Jahan, rebelled against his father, he captured the fort of Bardhaman.

In 1689, Raja Krishnaram Roy, of the Bardhaman Raj family, obtained a farman (royal decree) from Aurangzeb by which he was made the zamindar (landlord) of Bardhaman, and since then the Raj family's history became identical with that of the district. During the reign of Krishnaram Rai, Subha Singh, zamindar of Chitua and Barda, then part of Bardhaman, raised the standard of revolt in 1696. He was killed by Rajkumari Satyabati, when he tried to outrage her. Kirti Chandra Rai added the parganas of Chitua, Bhurshut, Barda and Manoharshahsi to his territories. He also seized the estates of the Raja of Belghara and attacked and defeated the powerful Raja of Bishnupur. Chitra Sen Ray was conferred the title of Raja by the Mughal emperor in 1740. He was succeeded by Tilakchand Ray, who was also conferred the title of Raja by the Mughal emperor. It was during his rule that East India Company acquired Bardhaman and other areas of Bengal.

After the death of Aurangzeb, the Mughal Empire became weak and Murshid Quli Khan became the Nawab of Bengal, owning only nominal allegiance to the Mughal emperor. At that time Bardhaman was referred to as chakla, a change from the earlier pargana. Subsequently, during the reign of Alivardi Khan, the Bargis attacked and plundered Bardhaman.

After the victory of the British in the Battle of Plassey in 1757, the fertile district of Bardhaman, along with Medinipur and Chittagong, was ceded to the East India Company. In 1857, the British Crown took over the administration of the country from the East India Company.

In 1765, when East India Company acquired the diwani of Bardhaman, it was composed of Bardhaman, Bankura, Hooghly and a third of Birbhum. Hooghly was separated in 1820, Bankura and Birbhum in 1837. In 1765, Tilakchand Ray was the zamindar of Bardhaman. He controlled 75 parganas and also looked after the law and order. At the time of the Permanent Settlement of Lord Cornwallis in 1793, the chaklas were reduced in size, in order to make them more manageable, and districts were created. Six subdivisions were created in Bardhaman district – Bud Bud in 1846, Katwa, Raniganj, Jahanabad (later named Arambagh), and Bardhaman Sadar in 1847 and Kalna in 1850. The parganas were converted to thanas (police stations). At that time there were 22 thanas in Bardhaman district. Later, Jahanabad was transferred out of Bardhaman. Some minor changes went on taking place.

The Permanent Settlement ultimately led to the dismemberment of the Bardhaman estate. As the rajas often failed to pay the rent demands, some parts of the estate were auctioned off. However, there were bright spots. Mahatabchand was appointed additional member of the Viceroy’s Executive Council and in 1877 was allowed to use the title of His Highness before his name. Bijoy Chand Mahatab was conferred the title of Maharajadhiraj by Lord Minto in 1908. Uday Chand Mahtab took over in 1941 and served till abolition of the zamindary system in 1954, after independence of the country.

Bardhaman district was bifurcated into two districts, Purba Bardhaman and Paschim Bardhman, on 7 April 2017.

== Geography ==
Bardhaman District had an area of 7,024 km^{2} and a population of 6,895,514 (2001 census). It was bounded on the north by Birbhum and Murshidabad districts, on the east by Nadia District, on the southeast by Hooghly District, on the southwest by Bankura and Purulia districts, and on the northwest by Dhanbad district of Jharkhand. The district had six sub-divisions: Asansol, Sadar (North), Sadar (South), Durgapur, Kalna, and Katwa.

=== Topography ===
Burdwan district with its varied tectonic elements and riverine features, is a transitional zone between the Jharkhand plateau which constitutes a portion of peninsular shield in the west and Ganga-Brahmaputra alluvial plain in the north and east. In general the Jharkhand plateau consists of the metasedimentary rocks of precambrian age, Gondwana sedimentary rocks, Rajmahal basalts and upper tertiary sediments. Laterite has developed on these older rocks as well as on early Quaternary sediments. To the south, the alluvial plain merges with Damodar-kasain-Subarnarekha deltaic plains. The western half of the district resembles a promontory jutting out from the hill ranges of Chotonagpur plateau and consists of barren, rocky and rolling country with a laterite soil rising into rocky hillocks, the highest being 227 m. These diversify the otherwise monotonous landscape and lend a special charm to the skyline around Asansol subdivision. Ajoy-barakar divide is a convex plateau, the average altitude being 150 m. The gradient is westerly to the west and to the east it is northerly toward Ajay and southerly toward Damodar below the latitude. The Ajoy-Damodar inter-stream tract is made up of several stows consisting of vales and low convex spurs which run in almost all directions except northeast and thus lends a very complicated character to local relief.

=== Rivers ===
The river system in Burdwan includes the Bhagirathi-Hooghly in the east, the Ajoy and its tributaries in the north, and the Dwarakeswar, the Damodar and its branches in the southwest. Besides, there are innumerable Khals and old riverbeds all over the area. The notable rivers and khals are Damodar, Bhagirathi, Barakar, Ajay, Dwarakeswar, Nonia, Singaram, Tamla, Kukua, Kunur, Tumuni, Khari, Banka, Chanda-kanki nala, Behula, Gangur, Brahmani, Khandesvari, Karulia nala, Dwaraka or Babla, Koiya nala, Kandarkahal, Kanadamodar, Kananadi, Ghea, Kakinadi etc.

=== Soil ===
Different types of soil are encountered in topographical biological, hydrological, and geological conditions in the Burdwan district. In the west, coarse gritty soil blended with rock fragments is formed from the weathering of pegmatite, quartz veins and conglomeratic sandstones, where as sandy soil characteristic of granite rocks and sandstones. This soil is reddish, medium to coarse in texture, acidic in reaction, low in nitrogen, calcium, phosphate and other plant nutrients. Water holding capacity of this soil increases with depth as well as with the increase of clay portions. Towards the east alluvial soil attains an enormous thickness in the low level plains to the east. These soils are sandy, well drained and slightly acidic.

=== Minerals ===
Burdwan was one of the premier districts in India in value of minerals. The Raniganj coalfield was the birthplace of the Indian coal industry. Besides coal, important minerals found in the district are iron ores, calcium carbonate, abrasives, silica bricks and moulding sands, glass sands, building materials, manganese, bauxite, laterite etc.

=== Water resources ===
There are many ponds, wells, canals, marshes and burrows all over the district. In the Damodar Valley region, there are around 17000 tanks. The Durgapur barrage and Mithon dam have formed two large reservoirs at the southwestern and western periphery of the district.

=== Forest ===
The forest areas of the district are chiefly in the lateritic and red soil highlands in the Aushgram PS of Sadar subdivision and in the Asansol subdivision.

=== National protected area ===
- Ramnabagan Wildlife Sanctuary

=== Climate ===
The district experiences a climate which is transitional between CWg and AW types, where 'C' stands for 'warm temperate rainy climates with mild winter', 'W' for 'dry winter not compensated for by total rain in the rest of the year', 'g ' for 'eastern Ganges type of temperature trend' and 'AW' for 'tropical savanna climates'. Average temperature in hot season is 30 C while at the cold season is 20 C. Average rainfall is 1496 mm. The cold season starts from about the middle of November and continues till the end of February. March to May is dry summerintervened by tropical cyclones and storms. June to September is wet summer while October and November is autumn.

== Demographics ==
Historical population
Year	Pop.	±% p.a.
1901	1,528,283	—
1911	1,533,868	+0.04%
1921	1,434,766	−0.67%
1931	1,575,694	+0.94%
1941	1,890,726	+1.84%
1951	2,191,660	+1.49%
1961	3,082,617	+3.47%
1971	3,916,174	+2.42%
1981	4,835,388	+2.13%
1991	6,050,605	+2.27%
2001	6,895,514	+1.32%
2011	7,717,563	+1.13%
Note: After 2011, the Bardhaman district was bifurcated into two separate districts namely Purba Bardhaman and Paschim Bardhaman. The census data is the addition of two split districts. Source: Census of India

According to the 2011 census Bardhaman district has a population of 7,717,563, roughly equal to the nation of Switzerland or the US state of Virginia. This gives it a ranking of 7th in India (out of a total of 640). The district has a population density of 1,100 inhabitants per square kilometre (2,800/sq mi). Its population growth rate over the decade 2001-2011 was 12.01%. Barddhaman has a sex ratio of 945 females for every 1000 males, and a literacy rate of 76.21%.

== Assembly constituencies ==
The district is divided into 26 assembly constituencies:

1. Kulti (assembly constituency no. 257),
2. Barabani (assembly constituency no. 258),
3. Hirapur (assembly constituency no. 259),
4. Asansol (assembly constituency no. 260),
5. Raniganj (assembly constituency no. 261),
6. Jamuria (assembly constituency no. 262),
7. Ukhra (SC) (assembly constituency no. 263),
8. Durgapur — I (assembly constituency no. 264),
9. Durgapur — II (assembly constituency no. 265),
10. Kanksa (SC) (assembly constituency no. 266),
11. Ausgram (SC) (assembly constituency no. 267),
12. Bhatar (assembly constituency no. 268),
13. Galsi (assembly constituency no. 269),
14. Bardhaman North (assembly constituency no. 270),
15. Bardhaman South (assembly constituency no. 271),
16. Khandaghosh (SC) (assembly constituency no. 272),
17. Raina (assembly constituency no. 273),
18. Jamalpur (SC) (assembly constituency no. 274),
19. Memari (assembly constituency no. 275),
20. Kalna (assembly constituency no. 276),
21. Nadanghat (assembly constituency no. 277),
22. Manteswar (assembly constituency no. 278),
23. Purbasthali (assembly constituency no. 279),
24. Katwa (assembly constituency no. 280),
25. Mangalkot (assembly constituency no. 281) and
26. Ketugram (SC) (assembly constituency no. 282).

Ukhra, Kanksa, Ausgram, Khandaghosh, Jamalpur and Ketugram constituencies are reserved for Scheduled Castes (SC) candidates.

Kulti, Barabani, Hirapur, Asansol, Raniganj, Jamuria and Ukhra constituencies are part of Asansol (Lok Sabha constituency).

Durgapur–I, Durgapur–II, Kanska and Galsi are assembly segments of Durgapur (Lok Sabha constituency), which also contains three assembly segments from Bankura district.

Bhatar, Bardhaman North, Bardhaman South, Khandaghosh, Raina, Jamalpur and Memari are assembly segments of Burdwan (Lok Sabha constituency).

Kalna, Nadanghat, Manteswar, Purbasthali and Katwa are assembly segments of Katwa (Lok Sabha constituency), which also contains two assembly constituencies from Hooghly district.

Ausgram and Mangalkot are part of Bolpur (Lok Sabha constituency), which has five other assembly segments from Birbhum district.

Ketugram constituency is part of Berhampore (Lok Sabha constituency), which contains six other assembly segments from Murshidabad district.

=== Impact of delimitation of constituencies ===
As per order of the Delimitation Commission in respect of the delimitation of constituencies in the West Bengal, the district will be divided into 25 assembly constituencies:

1. Khandaghosh (SC) (assembly constituency no. 259),
2. Bardhaman Dakshin (assembly constituency no. 260),
3. Raina (SC) (assembly constituency no. 261),
4. Jamalpur (SC) (assembly constituency no. 262),
5. Manteswar (assembly constituency no. 263),
6. Kalna (SC) (assembly constituency no. 264),
7. Memari (Vidhan Sabha constituency) (assembly constituency no. 265),
8. Bardhaman Uttar (SC) (assembly constituency no. 266),
9. Bhatar (assembly constituency no. 267),
10. Purbasthali Dakshin (assembly constituency no. 268),
11. Purbasthali Uttar (assembly constituency no. 269),
12. Katwa (assembly constituency no. 270),
13. Ketugram (assembly constituency no. 271),
14. Mangalkot (assembly constituency no. 272),
15. Ausgram (SC) (assembly constituency no. 273),
16. Galsi (SC) (assembly constituency no. 274),
17. Pandaveswar (Vidhan Sabha constituency) (assembly constituency no. 275),
18. Durgapur Purba (assembly constituency no. 276),
19. Durgapur Paschim (assembly constituency no. 277),
20. Raniganj (Vidhan Sabha constituency) (assembly constituency no. 278),
21. Jamuria (assembly constituency no. 279),
22. Asansol Dakshin (Vidhan Sabha constituency) (assembly constituency no. 280),
23. Asansol Uttar (Vidhan Sabha constituency) (assembly constituency no. 281),
24. Kulti (assembly constituency no. 282) and
25. Barabani (assembly constituency no. 283).

Khandaghosh, Raina, Jamalpur, Kalna, Bardhaman Uttar, Ausgram and Galsi constituencies will be reserved for Scheduled Castes (SC) candidates.

Khandaghosh constituency will be part of Bishnupur (Lok Sabha constituency), which will contain six other assembly segments from Bankura district.

Raina, Jamalpur, Kalna, Memari, Purbasthali Dakshin, Purbasthali Uttar and Katwa assembly constituencies will form the Bardhaman Purba (Lok Sabha constituency), which will be reserved for Scheduled Castes (SC) candidates.

Bardhaman Dakshin, Manteswar, Bardhaman Uttar, Bhatar, Galsi, Durgapur Purba and Durgapur Paschim will form the Bardhaman-Durgapur (Lok Sabha constituency).

Pandabeswar, Raniganj, Jamuria, Asansol Dakshin, Asansol Uttar, Kulti and Barabani constituencies will form the Asansol (Lok Sabha constituency).

Ketugram, Mangalkot and Ausgram will be part of Bolpur (Lok Sabha constituency), which will contain four other assembly segments from Birbhum district.
