= Prankrishna Tapadar =

Indian politician (born 1983)

Prankrishna Tapadar (born 1983) is an Indian politician from West Bengal. He is a member of the West Bengal Legislative Assembly from the Purbasthali Dakshin Assembly constituency in Purba Bardhaman district representing the Bharatiya Janata Party.

== Early life and education ==
Tapadar is from Purbasthali, Purba Bardhaman district, West Bengal. He is the son of Satyaranjan Tapadar. He studied up to Class 10 at Srirampur United High School and passed the Madhyamik examinations conducted by West Bengal Board of Secondary Education 1998. He and his wife run the family business. He declared assets worth Rs.12.9 crore in his affidavit to the Election Commission of India.

== Career ==
Tapadar won the Purbasthali Dakshin Assembly constituency representing the Bharatiya Janata Party in the 2026 West Bengal Legislative Assembly election. He polled 1,11,004 votes and defeated his nearest rival and sitting MLA, Swapan Debnath of the All India Trinamool Congress by a margin of 16,662 votes.
