= Gopal Chattopadhyay =

Indian politician (born 1977)

Gopal Chattopadhyay (born 1977) is an Indian politician from West Bengal. He is a member of West Bengal Legislative Assembly from the Purbasthali Uttar Assembly constituency in Purba Bardhaman district representing the Bharatiya Janata Party.

== Early life and education ==
Chattopadhyay is from Purbasthali, Purba Bardhaman district, West Bengal. He is the son of Amar Chattopadhyay. He completed his BEd at Government Teachers Training College, Malda in 2009 and his BA at Katwa College which is affiliated with Burdwan University in 1997. He works as an assistant teacher at Nabadwip Dham Vidyapith, Nadia district. He declared assets worth Rs.20 lakhs in 2016 and Rs.1 crore in 2026 in his affidavits to the Election Commission of India.

== Career ==
Chattopadhyay won the Purbasthali Uttar Assembly constituency representing the Bharatiya Janata Party in the 2026 West Bengal Legislative Assembly election. He polled 1,11,379 votes and defeated his nearest rival, Vasundhara Goswami of the All India Trinamool Congress, by a margin of 30,226 votes. Earlier, he lost the 2016 West Bengal Legislative Assembly election to Siddiqullah Chowdhury. who contested on the Trinamool Congress ticket from the Mangalkot Assembly constituency. He finished third behind winner Chowdhury and second placed Sahajahan Chowdhury of the Communist Party of India (Marxist).
