= Swapan Debnath =

Politician from West Bengal, India

Member of the West Bengal Legislative Assembly
- In office 13 May 2011 – 4 May 2026
- Preceded by: Subrata Bhowal
- Succeeded by: Prankrishna Tapadar
- Constituency: Purbasthali Dakshin

Member of the West Bengal Legislative Assembly
- In office 2006–2011
- Preceded by: Ratan Das
- Succeeded by: constituency abolished
- Constituency: Nadanghat

Personal details
- Born: 1952 (age 73–74) Purbasthali, Purba Bardhaman district, West Bengal
- Party: All India Trinamool Congress
- Education: Master of Commerce (University of Burdwan)

Swapan Debnath is an Indian politician from West Bengal. He was a member of the West Bengal Legislative Assembly from Purbasthali Dakshin Assembly constituency in Purba Bardhaman district since 2011. He won the 2021 West Bengal Legislative Assembly election representing the All India Trinamool Congress.

== Early life and education ==
Debnath is from Purbasthali, Purba Bardhaman district, West Bengal. He is the son of late Rasaraj Debnath. He completed Master of Commerce in 1973 at the University of Burdwan, Purba Bardhaman, West Bengal. His wife is a retired teacher.

== Career ==
Debnath won from Purbasthali Dakshin Assembly constituency representing All India Trinamool Congress in the 2021 West Bengal Legislative Assembly election. He polled 105,698 votes and defeated his nearest rival, Rajib Kumar Bhowmick of the Bharatiya Janata Party, by a margin of 17,410 votes.He met with controversy while critisising RG Kar protestors as 'parents must monitor their daughters' .
