= Purbasthali Assembly constituency =

Coordinates: 23°28′04″N 88°19′46″E

Purbasthali
- Former constituency No. 279 for the West Bengal Legislative Assembly

Constituency details
- Country: India
- Region: East India
- State: West Bengal
- District: Purba Bardhaman
- Lok Sabha constituency: Katwa
- Established: 1951
- Abolished: 2011
- Reservation: None

Purbasthali Assembly constituency was an assembly constituency in Purba Bardhaman district in the Indian state of West Bengal.

== Election results ==
=== 1977 - 2006 ===
Subrata Bhowal of Communist Party of India (Marxist) (CPI (M)) won the Purbasthali Assembly seat in 2006 and 2001 defeating his nearest rival Ansar Mondal of Trinamool Congress. In 1996, Himangshu Dutta of CPI (M) defeated Ansar Mondal of Indian National Congress. In 1991, 1987, 1982 and 1977, Manoranjan Nath of CPI (M) won the seat defeating Swapan Bhattacharya of Bharatiya Janata Party (BJP), Mukul Bhattacharya of Congress, Manabendra Kumar Roy of Congress and Rama Devi of Janata Party, in the respective years.

=== 1951-1972 ===
In 1972, Nurunessa Sattar of Congress won the Purbasthali assembly seat. Molla Humayun Kabir won the seat in 1971 and 1969. Lalit Mohan Hazra of CPI (M) won it in 1967. Bimalananda Tarkatirtha of Congress won the seat in 1962, 1957 and 1951.

== Impact of delimitation ==
As per orders of the Delimitation Commission, Purbasthali Assembly constituency and Nadanghat Assembly constituency ceased to exist and in its place Purbasthali now has two assembly constituencies. 268 Purbasthali Dakshin Assembly constituency covers Nandai, Kankuria, Begpur, Atghoria Simlan, Dhatrigram and Sultanpur gram panchayats of Kalna I community development block and Nasratpur, Samudragarh, Bogpur, Sreerampur and Nadanghat gram panchayats of Purbasthali I community development block. 269 Purbasthali Uttar Assembly constituency covers Purbasthali II community development block, Jahannagar and Dogachia gram panchayats of Purbasthali I CD Block, and Bamunpara, Mamudpur II and Putsuri gram panchayats of Manteswar CD Block.

Purbasthali assembly segment was earlier part of Katwa (Lok Sabha constituency). As per orders of Delimitation Commission both Purbasthali Dakshin and Purbasthali Uttar are part of Bardhaman Purba (Lok Sabha constituency).
