= Mollah Humayun Kabir =

West Bengal politician

Member of West Bengal Legislative Assembly
- In office 1969–1977
- Preceded by: Lalit Mohan Hazra
- Succeeded by: Nurunnesa Sattar
- Constituency: Purbasthali Dakshin

Personal details
- Born: Purbasthali, Bardhaman district, Bengal Presidency
- Party: Communist Party of India (Marxist)

Mollah Humayun Kabir is an Indian politician belonging to the Communist Party of India (Marxist). He was the MLA of Purbasthali Dakshin Assembly constituency in the West Bengal Legislative Assembly.

== Early life and family ==
Kabir was born into a Bengali family of Muslim Mollahs in Purbasthali, Bardhaman district, Bengal Presidency.

== Career ==
Kabir contested in the 1969 West Bengal Legislative Assembly election where he ran as a Communist Party of India (Marxist) candidate for Purbasthali Dakshin Assembly constituency. He was re-elected in the subsequent 1971 West Bengal Legislative Assembly election. Kabir lost to Indian National Congress candidate Nurunnesa Sattar at the 1972 West Bengal Legislative Assembly election.
