= Ketugram Assembly constituency =

Ketugram
- Constituency No. 271 for the West Bengal Legislative Assembly
- Interactive Map Outlining Ketugram Assembly Constituency

Constituency details
- Country: India
- Region: East India
- State: West Bengal
- District: Purba Bardhaman
- Lok Sabha constituency: Bolpur
- Established: 1951
- Total electors: 197,770
- Reservation: None

Member of Legislative Assembly
- 18th West Bengal Legislative Assembly
- Incumbent Anadi Ghosh
- Party: BJP
- Alliance: NDA
- Elected year: 2026

Ketugram Assembly constituency is an assembly constituency in Purba Bardhaman district in the Indian state of West Bengal.

== Overview ==
As per orders of the Delimitation Commission No. 271 Ketugram assembly constituency covers Ketugram I and Ketugram II blocks and Koshigram and Srikhanda gram panchayats of Katwa I block.

As per orders of the Delimitation Commission Ketugram assembly constituency is part of No. 41 Bolpur Lok Sabha constituency. Ketugram (SC) assembly constituency was earlier a part of Baharampur Lok Sabha constituency.

== Members of the Legislative Assembly ==
Year	Member	Party
1951	Tarapada Bandopadhyay	Hindu Mahasabha
1957	Sankar Dass	Indian National Congress
1957	Abdus Sattar	Indian National Congress
1962	Sreemohan Thakur	Communist Party of India
1967	P. Mandal	Indian National Congress
1969	Ramgoti Mondal	Communist Party of India (Marxist)
1971	Nirmal Chandra Mandal	Communist Party of India (Marxist)
1972	Prabhakar Mandal	Indian National Congress
1977	Raicharan Majhi	Communist Party of India (Marxist)
1982	Raicharan Majhi	Communist Party of India (Marxist)
1987	Raicharan Majhi	Communist Party of India (Marxist)
1991	Raicharan Majhi	Communist Party of India (Marxist)
1996	Tamal Majhi	Communist Party of India (Marxist)
2001	Tamal Chandra Majhi	Communist Party of India (Marxist)
2006	Tamal Chandra Majhi	Communist Party of India (Marxist)
2011	Sekh Sahonawez	Trinamool Congress
2016	Sekh Sahonawez	Trinamool Congress
2021	Sekh Sahonawez	Trinamool Congress
2026	Anadi Ghosh	Bharatiya Janata Party

== Election results ==
=== 2026 ===
2026 West Bengal Legislative Assembly election: Ketugram
Party	Candidate	Votes	%	±%
BJP	Anadi Ghosh	111,104	50.69	▲10.03
AITC	Sekh Sahonawez	83,494	38.09	▼8.46
AISF	Jakir Gaine	10,700	4.88	
NOTA	None of the above	4,034	1.84	▲0.16
Independent	Mathura Ghosh	2,509	1.14	
INC	Sheikh Abubakkar	2,167	0.99	
AJUP	Sabina Yasmin	2,141	0.98	
Majority		27,610	12.6	▲6.71
Turnout		219,183	93.39	▲10.03
BJP gain from AITC		Swing		

=== 2021 ===
2021 West Bengal Legislative Assembly election: Ketugram
Party	Candidate	Votes	%	±%
AITC	Sekh Sahonawez	100,226	46.55	▲0.35
BJP	Anadi Ghosh	87,543	40.66	▲32.06
CPI(M)	Mizanul Kabir	20,092	9.33	▼32.36
BSP	Manik Chandra Pradhan	2,293	1.06	
NOTA	None of the above	3,620	1.68	
Majority		12,683	5.89	
Turnout		215,317	83.36	
AITC hold		Swing		

=== 2016 ===
2016 West Bengal Legislative Assembly election: Ketugram
Party	Candidate	Votes	%	±%
AITC	Sekh Sahonawez	89,441	46.20	▲0.50
CPI(M)	Abdul Kadar Syed	80,712	41.69	▼3.06
BJP	Bankubihari Ghosh	16,641	8.60	▲2.07
NOTA	None of the above	4,414	2.28	New entry
SUCI(C)	M. H. Munsi	2,391	1.24	New entry
Majority		8,729	4.51	▲3.56
Turnout		1,93,599	83.34	▼2.11
AITC hold		Swing		

=== 2011 ===
2011 West Bengal Legislative Assembly election: Ketugram
Party	Candidate	Votes	%	±%
AITC	Sekh Sahonawez	77,323	45.70	
CPI(M)	Abdul Kadar Syed	75,724	44.75	
BJP	Debabrata Basu	11,051	6.53	
Independent	Kazi Safikur Rahaman	5,109	3.02	
Majority		1,599	0.95	
Turnout		1,69,207	85.45	
AITC gain from CPI(M)		Swing		

=== 2006 ===
Tamal Chandra Majhi of CPI(M) won the Ketugram (SC) assembly seat defeating Amar Ram of Congress in 2006 and 2001, and Narayan Chandra Poddar of Congress in 1996. Contests in most years were multi cornered but only winners and runners are being mentioned. Raicharan Majhi of CPI(M) defeated Chand Kumar Saha of BJP in 1991, Prabahakar Mandal of Congress in 1987, Lal Mohan Saha of Congress in 1982 and Prabhakar Mandal of Congress in 1977.

=== 1972 ===
Prabakar Mondal of Congress won the Ketugram seat in 1972. Nirmal Chandra Mandal of CPI(M) won in 1971. Ramgati Mandal of CPI(M) won in 1969. P.Mandal of Congress won in 1967. Sree Mohan Thakur of CPI won in 1962. Ketugram had a joint seat in 1957. It was won by Sankar Dass and Abdus Sattar, both of Congress. In independent India's first election in 1951 Tarapada Bandopadhya of Hindu Mahasabha won the Ketugram seat.
