= Purbasthali Uttar Assembly constituency =

Purbasthali Uttar
- Constituency No. 269 for the West Bengal Legislative Assembly
- Interactive Map Outlining Purbasthali Uttar Assembly Constituency

Constituency details
- Country: India
- Region: East India
- State: West Bengal
- District: Purba Bardhaman
- Lok Sabha constituency: Bardhaman Purba
- Established: 1951
- Total electors: 188,997
- Reservation: None

Member of Legislative Assembly
- 18th West Bengal Legislative Assembly
- Incumbent Gopal Chattopadhyay
- Party: BJP
- Alliance: NDA
- Elected year: 2026

Purbasthali Uttar Assembly constituency is an assembly constituency in Purba Bardhaman district in the Indian state of West Bengal.

== Overview ==
As per orders of the Delimitation Commission, No. 269 Purbasthali Uttar Assembly constituency covers Purbasthali II community development block, Jahannagar and Dogachia gram panchayats of Purbasthali I CD Block, and Bamunpara, Mamudpur II and Putsuri gram panchayats of Manteswar CD Block.

As per orders of Delimitation Commission, Purbasthali Uttar Assembly constituency is part of No. 38 Bardhaman Purba Lok Sabha constituency.

== Members of the Legislative Assembly ==
Year	Name	Party
Purbasthali
1951	Bimalananda Tarkatirtha	Indian National Congress
1957	Bimalananda Tarkatirtha	Indian National Congress
1962	Bimalananda Tarkatirtha	Indian National Congress
1967	Lalit Mohan Hazra	Communist Party of India
1969	Mollah Humayun Kabir	Communist Party of India
1971	Mollah Humayun Kabir	Communist Party of India
1972	Nurunnesa Sattar	Indian National Congress
1977	Manoranjan Nath	Communist Party of India
1982	Manoranjan Nath	Communist Party of India
1987	Manoranjan Nath	Communist Party of India
1991	Manoranjan Nath	Communist Party of India
1996	Himanshu Dutta	Communist Party of India
2001	Subrata Bhowal	Communist Party of India
2006	Subrata Bhowal	Communist Party of India
Purbasthali Uttar
2011	Tapan Chatterjee	Trinamool Congress
2016	Pradip Kumar Saha	Communist Party of India (Marxist)
2021	Tapan Chatterjee	Trinamool Congress
2026	Gopal Chattopadhyay	Bharatiya Janata Party

== Election results ==
=== 2026 ===
2026 West Bengal Legislative Assembly election: Purbasthali Uttar
Party	Candidate	Votes	%	±%
BJP	Gopal Chattopadhyay	111,379	49.53	▲9.16
AITC	Vasundhara Goswami	81,153	36.09	▼7.43
CPI(M)	Pradip Kumar Saha	25,577	11.37	▼1.88
NOTA	None of the above	1,188	0.53	▼0.11
Majority		30,226	13.44	▲10.29
Turnout		224,880	93.73	▲9.68
BJP gain from AITC		Swing		

=== 2021 ===
2021 West Bengal Legislative Assembly election: Purbasthali Uttar
Party	Candidate	Votes	%	±%
AITC	Tapan Chatterjee	92,421	43.52	▲1.59
BJP	Gobardhan Das	85,715	40.37	▲28.87
CPI(M)	Pradip Kumar Saha	28,134	13.25	▼30.13
NOTA	None of the above	1,350	0.64	
Majority		6,706	3.15	
Turnout		212,343	84.05	
AITC gain from CPI(M)		Swing		

=== 2016 ===
2016 West Bengal Legislative Assembly election: Purbasthali Uttar
Party	Candidate	Votes	%	±%
CPI(M)	Pradip Kumar Saha	84,549	43.38	▲2.03
AITC	Tapan Chatterjee	81,721	41.93	▼0.70
BJP	Swapan Bhattacharya	22,410	11.50	▲1.18
BSP	Jyotsna Goldar	2,193	1.13	▼0.04
NOTA	None of the above	1,534	0.79	New entry
CPI(ML)L	Ansarul Aman Mondal	1,516	0.78	▼0.51
Socialist	Binod Bihari Debnath	997	0.51	New entry
Majority		2,828	1.45	▲0.17
Turnout		1,94,920	86.43	▼1.65
CPI(M) gain from AITC		Swing		

=== 2011 ===
2011 West Bengal Legislative Assembly election: Purbasthali Uttar
Party	Candidate	Votes	%	±%
AITC	Tapan Chatterjee	71,107	42.63	
CPI(M)	Pradip Kumar Saha	68,967	41.35	
BJP	Swapan Bhattacharya	17,222	10.32	
PDCI	Amanullah Sekh	5,394	3.23	
CPI(ML)L	Ashoke Chowdhury	2,159	1.29	
BSP	Sanjib Hazra	1,957	1.17	
Majority		2,140	1.28	
Turnout		1,66,806	88.08	
AITC win (new seat)				
