= Purba Bardhaman district =

District in West Bengal, India

Purba Bardhaman district Purbō Bôrdhōmān (Bengali)
- District of West Bengal
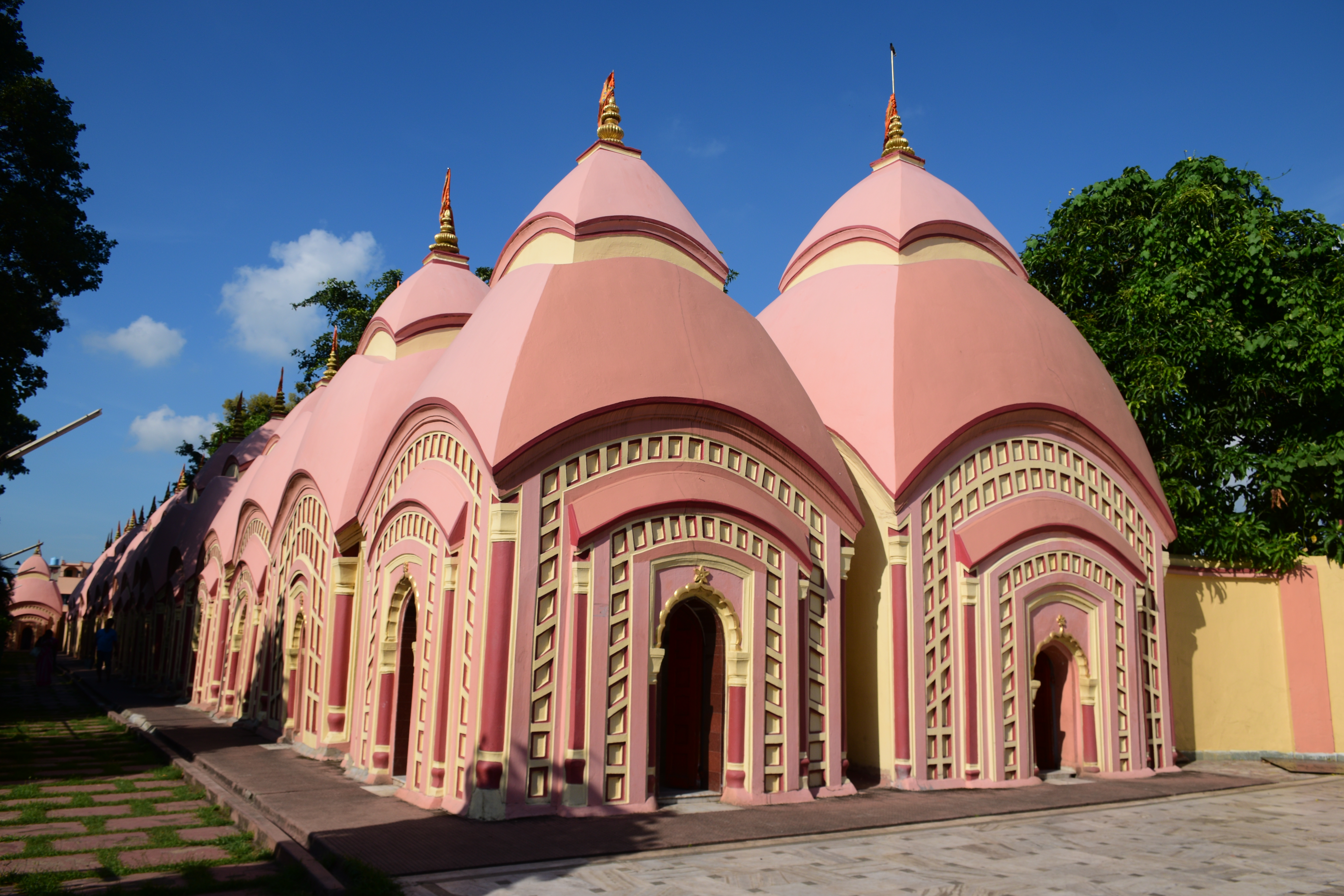
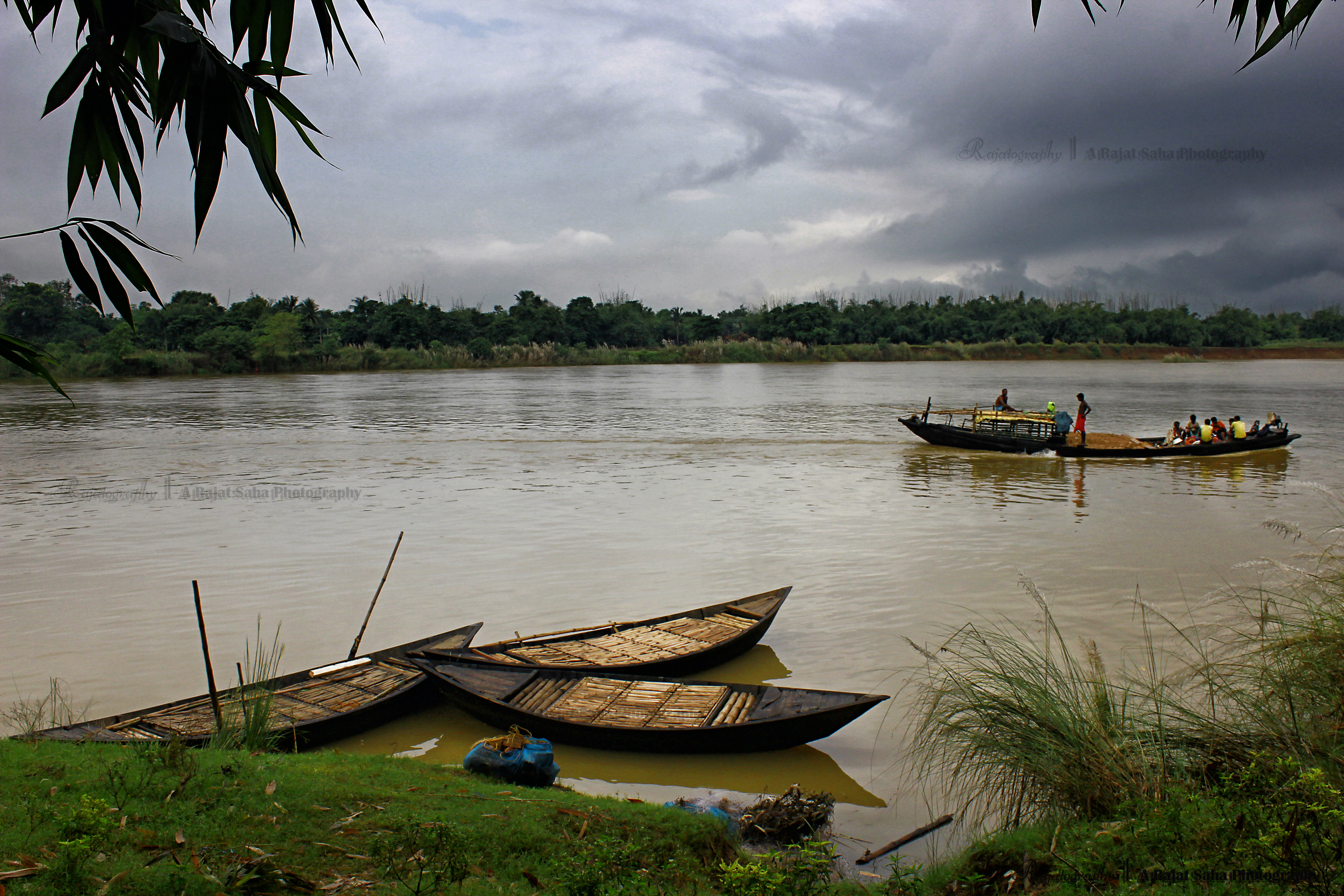
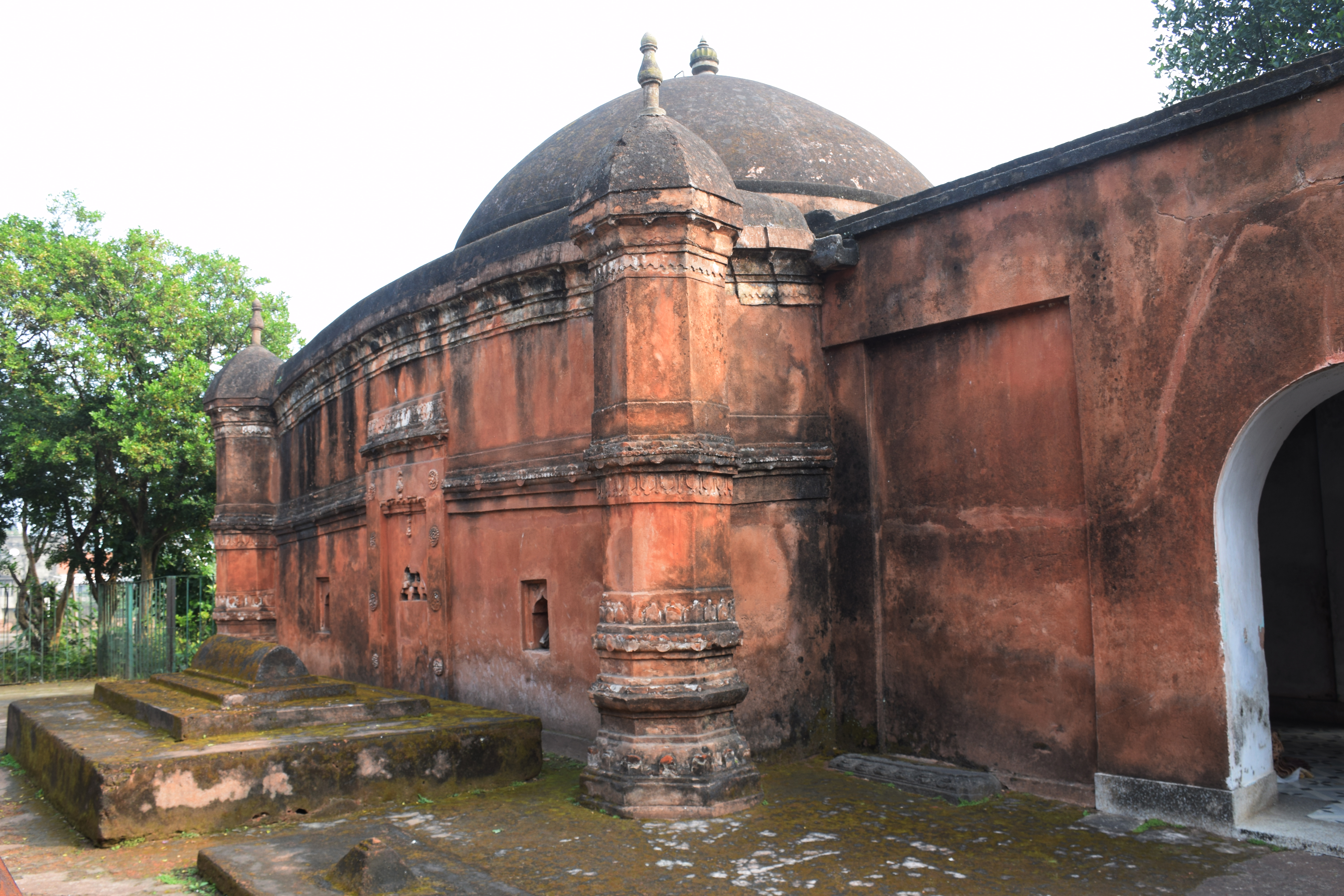
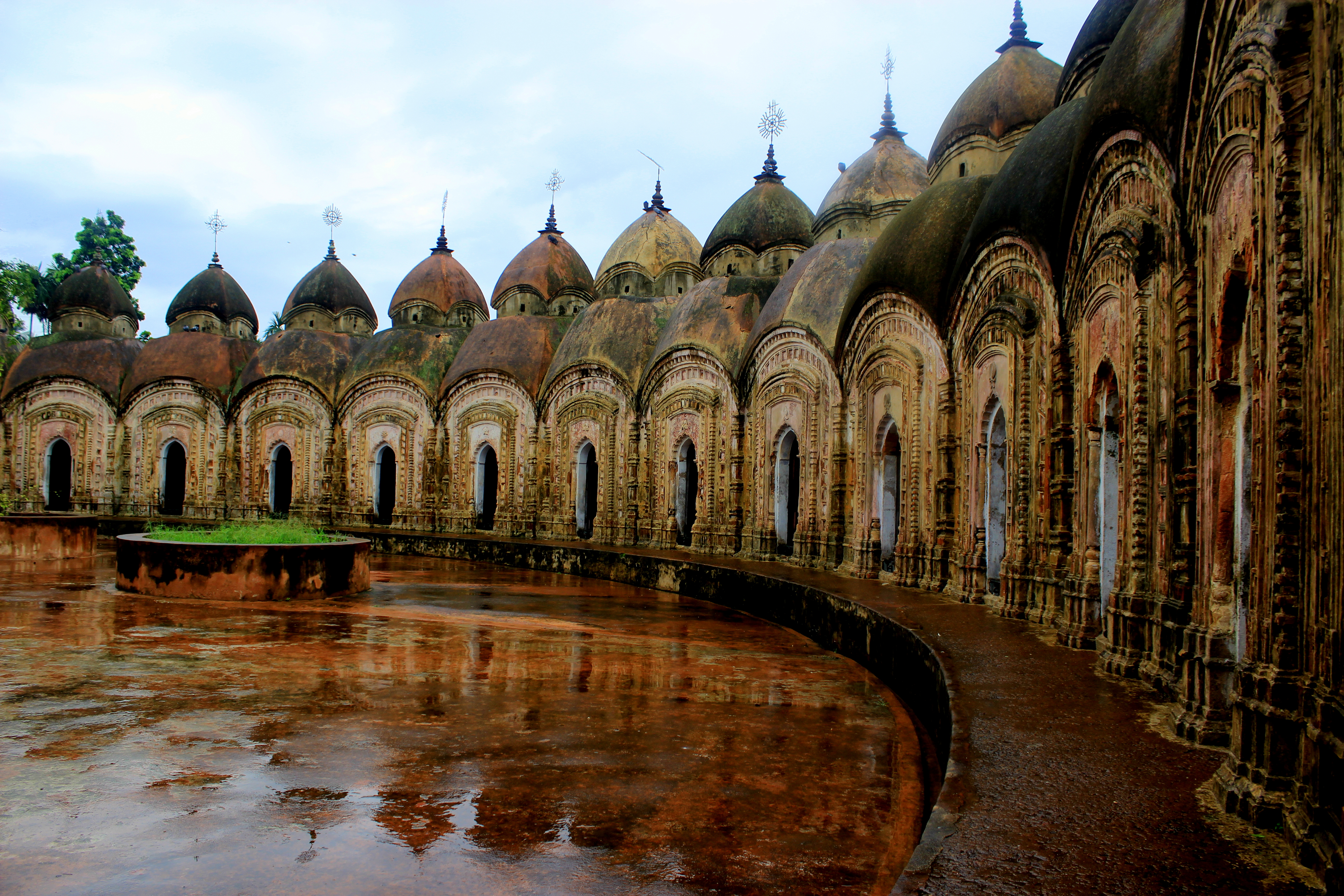
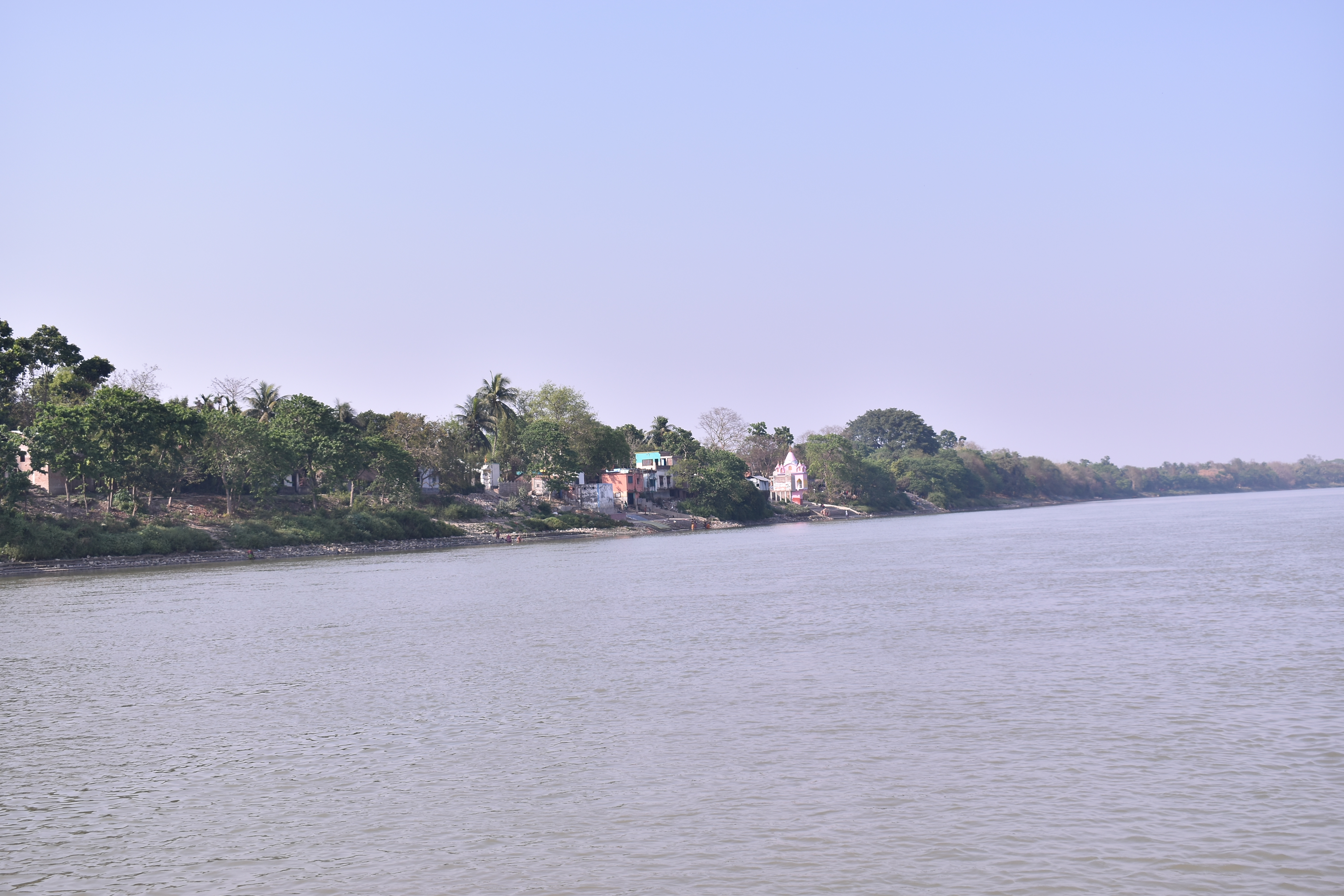
- Clockwise from top-left: 108 Shiva Temple at Nababhat, Ajay River at Katwa, Naba Kailash Mandir at Kalna, Uddharanpur Ghat, Mosque of Pir Bahram Sakka in Bardhaman

- Location of Purba Bardhaman district in West Bengal
- Coordinates: 23°22′N 87°58′E
- Country: India
- State: West Bengal
- Division: Burdwan
- Headquarters: Bardhaman

Government
  - Subdivisions: Bardhaman Sadar North, Bardhaman Sadar South, Kalna, Katwa
  - CD Blocks: Ausgram I, Ausgram II, Bhatar, Burdwan I, Burdwan II, Galsi I, Galsi II, Khandaghosh, Jamalpur, Memari I, Memari II, Raina I, Raina II, Kalna I, Kalna II, Manteswar, Purbasthali I, Purbasthali II, Katwa I, Katwa II, Ketugram I, Ketugram II, Mongakote
  - Lok Sabha constituencies: Bardhaman-Durgapur, Bardhaman Purba, Bishnupur, Bolpur
  - Vidhan Sabha constituencies: Bardhaman Dakshin, Bardhaman Uttar, Bhatar, Galsi, Raina, Jamalpur, Memari, Khandaghosh, Katwa, Mangalkot, Ketugram, Ausgram, Kalna, Purbasthali Dakshin, Purbasthali Uttar, Manteswar

Area
  - Total: 5,432.69 km^{2} (2,097.57 sq mi)

Population (2011)
  - Total: 4,835,532
  - Density: 890.081/km^{2} (2,305.30/sq mi)

Demographics
  - Literacy: 74.73 per cent
  - Sex ratio: 945 ♂/♀

Languages
  - Official: Bengali
  - Additional official: English
- Time zone: UTC+05:30 (IST)
- Website: purbabardhaman.gov.in

Purba Bardhaman district is in the Indian state of West Bengal. Its headquarters is in Bardhaman. It was formed on 7 April 2017 after the division of the previous Bardhaman district.

== Etymology ==
Some historians link the name of the district to the 24th and last Jain tirthankara, Mahavira Vardhamana, who came to preach in the area. Alternatively, Bardhamana means a prosperous and growing area. It was a forward frontier zone in the progress of Aryanisation by the people in the Upper Gangetic valley. Purba means east.

== History ==
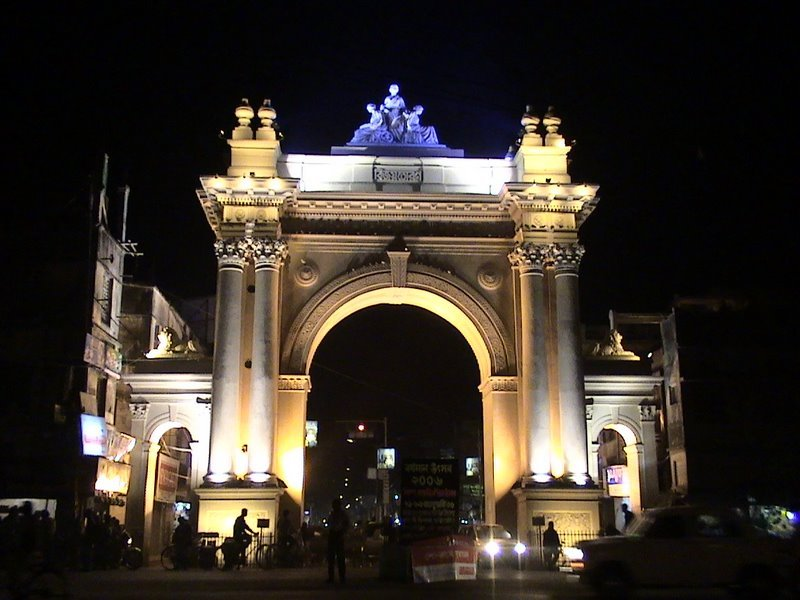
Curzon Gate in Bardhaman

The district is recorded in the early 20th century British chronicles as 'the richest tract in Bengal and the area of its oldest and most settled cultivation'. Archaeological excavations at Pandu Rajar Dhibi have indicated settlements in the Ajay valley in the Mesolithic age, around 5,000 BC. In early historical times Bardhamanbhukti, a part of the Rarh region, was ruled successively by the Magadhas, Mauryas, Kushanas and Guptas. In the 7th century AD, when Shashanka was king, the area was part of the Gauda Kingdom. It was subsequently ruled by the Palas and Senas.

Bakhtiyar Khilji captured it in 1199 AD. The early Muslim rulers ruled over major parts of Bengal from Gauda or Lakhnauti. In Ain-i-Akbari, Bardhaman is mentioned as a mahal or pargana of Sarcar Sharifabad. Some western parts of Bardhaman formed Gopbhum, ruled for many centuries by the Sadgop kings. There are remains of a fort at Amrargar.

In 1689, Raja Krishnaram Roy, of the Bardhaman Raj family, obtained from Aurangzeb a farman (royal decree) which made him the zamindar (landlord) of Bardhaman, and since then the Raj family's history became identical with that of the district. After the death of Aurangzeb, the Mughal Empire became weak and Murshid Quli Khan became the Nawab of Bengal, owning only nominal allegiance to the Mughal emperor. At that time Bardhaman was referred to as a chakla, a change from the earlier pargana. Subsequently, during the reign of Alivardi Khan, the Bargis attacked and plundered Bardhaman.

After the victory of the British in the Battle of Plassey in 1757, Bardhaman, Medinipur and Chittagong were ceded to the East India Company. In 1857, the British Crown took over the administration of the country from the East India Company.

In 1765, when East India Company acquired the diwani of Bardhaman, it was composed of Bardhaman, Bankura, Hooghly and a third of Birbhum. Hooghly was separated in 1820, Bankura and Birbhum in 1837.

In 1765, Tilakchand Ray, as the zamindar of Bardhaman, controlled 75 parganas and also looked after the law and order. At the time of the Permanent Settlement of Lord Cornwallis in 1793, the chaklas were reduced in size, in order to make them more manageable, and districts were created. Six subdivisions were created in Bardhaman district – Bud Bud in 1846, Katwa, Raniganj, Jahanabad (later named Arambagh), Bardhaman Sadar in 1847 and Kalna in 1850. The parganas were converted to thanas (police stations). At that time Bardhaman district had 22 thanas. Later, Jahanabad was transferred out of Bardhaman. Some minor changes continued.

The Permanent Settlement ultimately led to the dismemberment of the Bardhaman estate. As the rajas often failed to pay the rent demands, some parts of the estate were auctioned off. However, there were bright spots. Mahatabchand was appointed additional member of the Viceroy's Executive Council and in 1877 was allowed to use the title of His Highness before his name. Bijoy Chand Mahatab was conferred the title of Maharajadhiraj by Lord Minto in 1908. Uday Chand Mahtab took over in 1941 and served till abolition of the zamindary system in 1954, after independence of the country.

Bardhaman district was bifurcated into two districts, Purba Bardhaman and Paschim Bardhman, on 7 April 2017.

== Geography ==
=== Overview ===
Purba Bardhaman district is a flat alluvial plain area that can be divided into four prominent topographical regions. On the north, the Kanksa Ketugram Plain lies along the Ajay, which joins the Bhagirathi. The Bardhaman Plain occupies the central area of the district, with the Damodar on the south and the south-east. On the southern part is the Khandaghosh Plain. The Bhagirathi flows along the eastern boundary of the district, and the Bhagirathi Basin occupies the eastern part of the district. The undulating laterite topography of Paschim Bardhaman district extends up to Ausgram area of this district.

Roypara Gopal Jeu Temple at Majigram

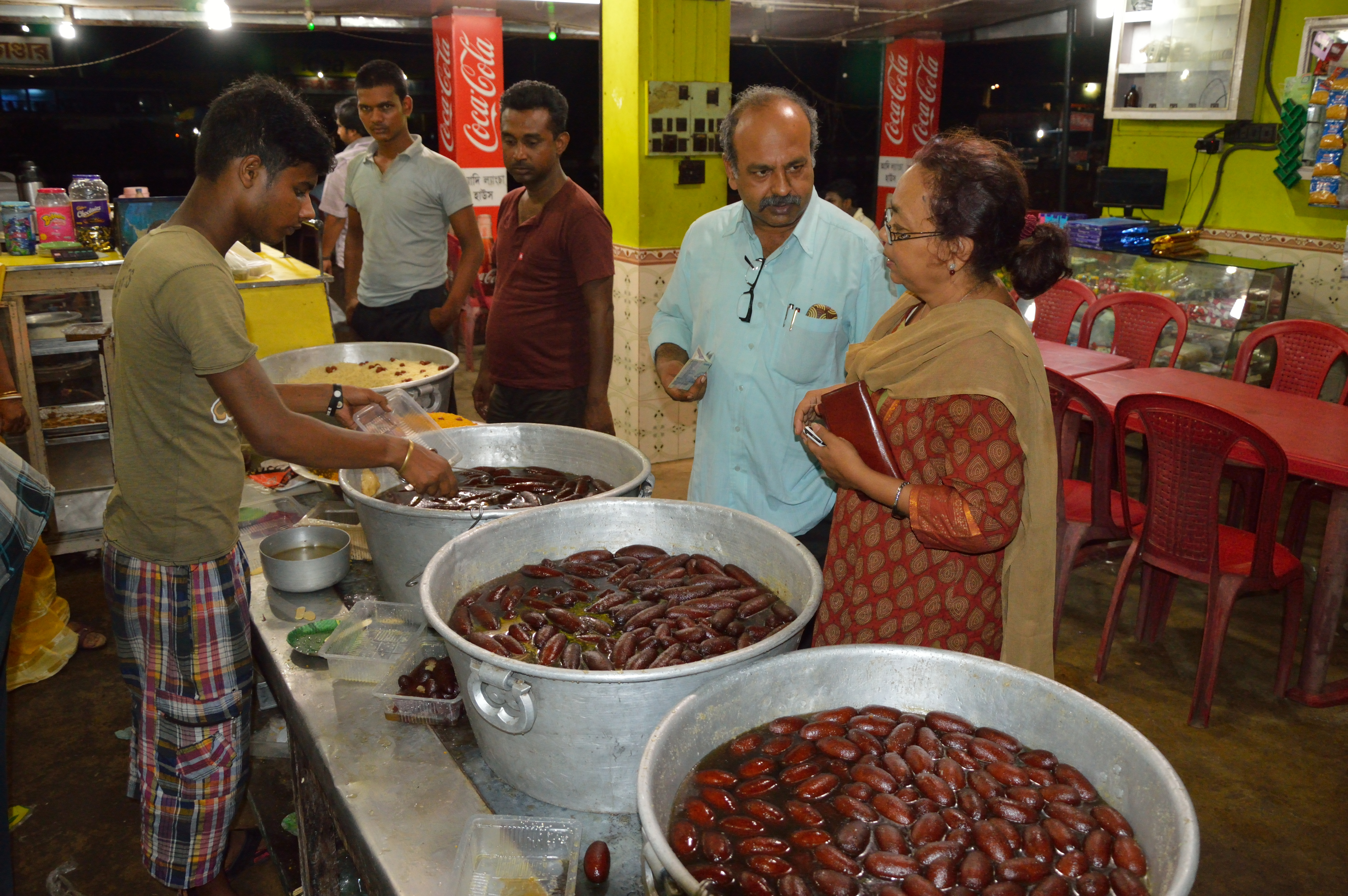
A langcha shop in Saktigarh

=== Climate ===
Purba Bardhaman district has a tropical climate - hot and humid. While the hottest month is May, the coldest is January. The monsoon season is from June to September, with an annual average rainfall of 1,400 mm, 75% of it falling in the monsoon months. Localised thunderstorms, called kalbaisakhi in Bengali, are a special feature from March until the monsoon sets in.

=== Administrative divisions ===
Purba Bardhaman district is divided into the following administrative subdivisions:

Subdivision	Headquarters	Area km^{2}	Population (2011)	Rural Population % (2011)	Urban Population % (2011)
Bardhaman Sadar North	Bardhaman	1,958.43	1,586,623	73.58	26.42
Bardhaman Sadar South	Bardhaman	1,410.03	1,198,155	95.54	4.46
Katwa	Katwa	1,070.48	963,022	88.44	11.56
Kalna	Kalna	993.75	1,097,732	87.00	13.00
Purba Bardhaman district	Bardhaman	5,432.69	4,835,532	84.98	15.02

The district comprises four subdivisions:

- Kalna subdivision consists of one municipality at Kalna and five CD blocks: Kalna I, Kalna II, Manteswar, Purbasthali I and Purbasthali II.
- Katwa subdivision consists of two municipalities at Katwa and Dainhat and five CD blocks: Katwa I, Katwa II, Ketugram I, Ketugram II and Mongakote.
- Bardhaman Sadar North subdivision consists of two municipalities at Bardhaman and Guskara and seven CD blocks: Ausgram I, Ausgram II, Bhatar, Burdwan I, Burdwan II, Galsi I and Galsi II.

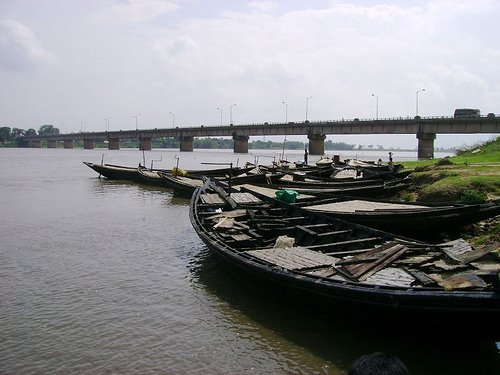
Krishak Setu across the Damodar near Bardhaman

- Bardhaman Sadar South subdivision consists of one municipality at Memari and six CD blocks: Khandaghosh, Jamalpur, Memari I, Memari II, Raina I and Raina II.

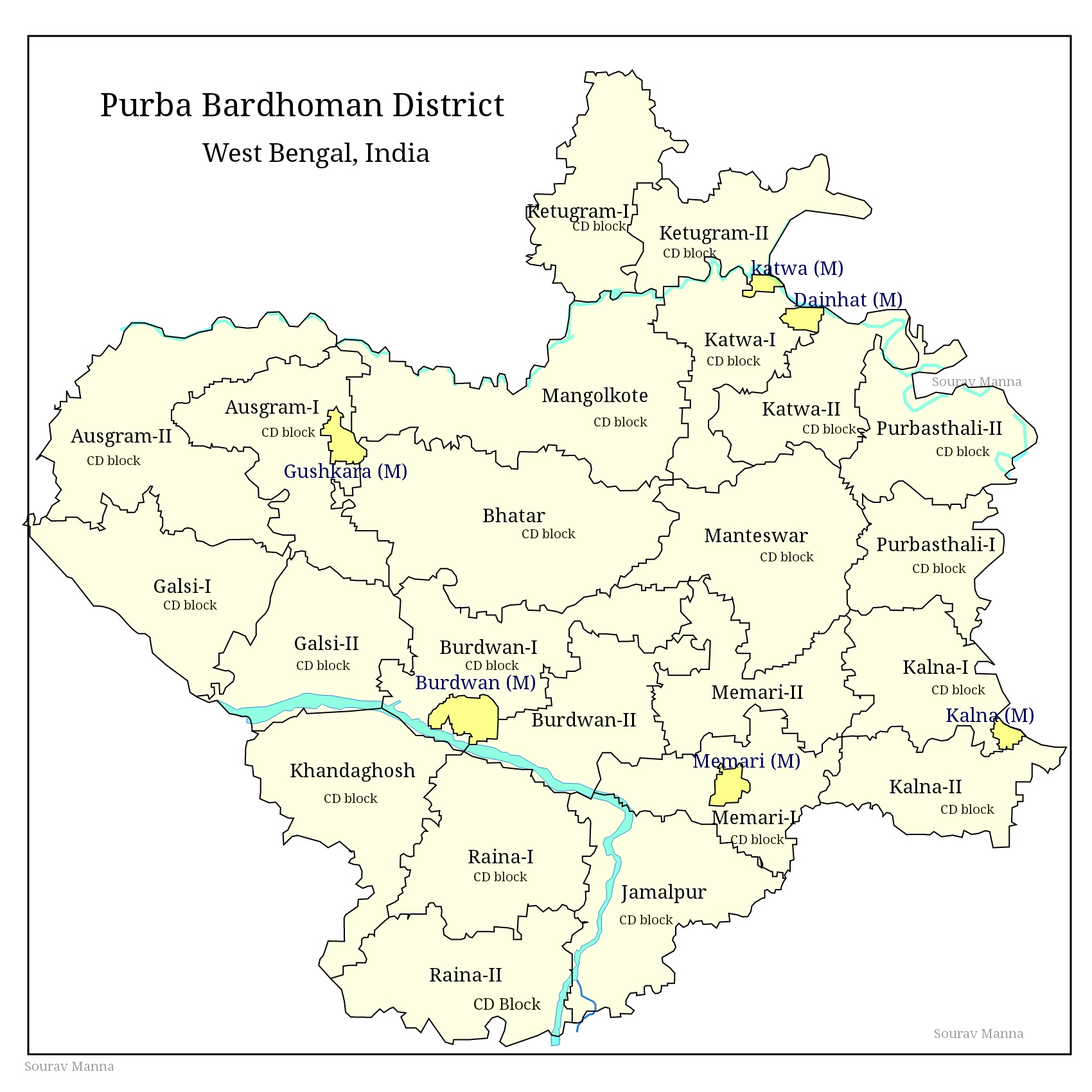
Map of purba bardhaman district

== Demographics ==
As per the 2011 Census of India data, recast after bifurcation of Bardhaman district in 2017, Purba Bardhaman district had a total population of 4,835,532. There were 2,469,310 (51%) males and 2,366,222 (49%) females. Population below 6 years was 509,855. 726,345 (15.02%) live in urban areas. Scheduled Castes and Scheduled Tribes make up 1,487,151 (30.75%) and 327,501 (6.77%) of the population respectively.

As per the 2011 census data, recast after bifurcation of Bardhaman district in 2017, the total number of literates in Purba Bardhaman district was 3,232,452 (74.73% of the population over 6 years) out of which males numbered 1,781,090 (80.60% of the male population over 6 years) and females numbered 1,453,362 (68.66% of the female population over 6 years).

=== Religion ===
Religion in Purba Bardhaman district (2011)
Hinduism	73.75%
Islam	25.14%
Other (tribal religion)	0.67%
Other or not stated	0.45%

Religion in present-day Purba Bardhaman district (1941)
Religion	Population (1941)	Percentage (1941)	Population (2011)	Percentage (2011)
Hinduism	922,290	71.77%	3,566,068	73.75%
Islam	277,573	21.60%	1,215,737	25.14%
Tribal religion (Note: In the 1941 census all tribals were counted under 'Tribal' religion, irrespective of their actual religion.)	84,493	6.58%	32,396	0.67%
Others (Note: Including Jainism, Christianity, Buddhism, Zoroastrianism, Judaism, Ad-Dharmis, or not stated)	687	0.05%	21,331	0.44%
Total Population	1,285,043	100%	4,835,532	100%

Hinduism is the majority religion, while Islam is the second-largest religion. The many zamindars of Bardhaman, largely Hindus, built many family temples which dot the landscape. Most of the tribals follow Hinduism but with the flavour of their tribal religion.

Islam is more concentrated in rural areas, and makes up a significant minority in Ketugram I (46.77%) and Manteswar (41.77%) CD blocks.

=== Languages ===
Languages of Purba Bardhaman district (2011)
1. Bengali (92.9%)
2. Santali (5.03%)
3. Hindi (1.66%)
4. Others (0.45%)

According to the 2011 census, 92.86% of the population in what is now Purba Bardhaman district spoke Bengali, 5.03% Santali and 1.66% Hindi as their first language.

== Flora ==
The flora of Purba Bardhaman district is composed mostly of woody plants. Amongst the flora are: Simul (Salmalia malabarica), neem (Azadirachta indica, amlaki (Phyllanthus emblica), Indian ash tree (Lannea coromandelica), coconut, date palm, tal (Palmyra palm / Borassus flabellifer), bat (banyan/ Ficus benghalensis), asvattha (pipal/ Ficus religiosa), palash (Butea monosperma), krishnachuda (Caesalpinia pulcherrima) and am (mango/ mangifera indica). There are some shrubby plants: ashsheoda (orangeberry/ Glycosmis pentaphylla, pianj (onion), rasun (garlic), rajanigandha (tube rose/Agave amica), gulancha (Tinospora cordifolia), tulsi (basil/ Ocimum tenuiflorum) etc.

The common aquatic or marsh weeds found in jheels (lakes) and swamps of the eastern part of the district (in the Bhagirathi Basin) are: bena (andropogon squarrosos), water hyacinth (Eichhornia crassipes), padma (nelumbo nucifera), hogla (Typha domingensis) etc.

== Fauna ==
The mammals of the district include wolf and golden jackal whilst wild boar and monkeys (including hanuman) are seen frequently. Poisonous snakes such as Indian cobra, common krait and Russell's viper, as well as dhamnas and harmless grass snakes are very common. The common avifauna of the district include red-vented bulbul, bluethroat, Indian robin and common myna. Other bird species include fowls, crows, munia, sparrow, cuckoo, Asian koel, parakeet, woodpecker, kingfisher, owl, vulture, eagle, kite, hawk, stork, duck, pigeon, falcon and heron. The low lying swampy areas are home to migratory birds in winter.

The principal varieties fish caught are rohu, mrigala, catla, kharke bata (reba), bhangan bata (bata), shrimp (smaller variety of prawn), maurala, pabda, tengra, bele, chela, punti, boal, aid, galda (large variety of prawn), vacha, chital, pholoi, khaira, fensa, silon, and bhola.

== Rural poverty ==
According to the District Human Development Report, Bardhaman, "The legendary prosperity of Bardhaman in history has to be taken as that of the ruling class – the rich, the royals and their assistants." It is only in the relatively recent past that the focus has shifted to the toiling masses.

As per the rural household survey conducted by the state government in 2005, the percentage of rural households living below poverty line in the old Bardhaman district was 33.49%. Using the same data the percentage of households living below poverty line in Purba Bardhaman district is 37.14%.

== Economy ==
=== Agriculture ===
Purba Bardhaman is an agriculturally prosperous district of West Bengal. The soil and climate of the district favour the production of food grains. The undivided Bardhaman district was the largest producer of rice in West Bengal, and bulk of it was produced in what is now Purba Bardhaman district. Rice, the major crop has three varieties – Aus (in autumn), Aman (in winter) and Boro (in summer). Other than cereals and pulses, cash crops such as mustard, til, jute and potatoes are also grown.

The year 1953 was a major turning point for agriculture in the district. Prior to 1953, cultivation was largely monsoon-dependent. In 1953, the irrigation projects of Damodar Valley Corporation were implemented. Irrigation and intensive cropping pattern provided the real momentum to agriculture. The undivided Bardhaman district topped the state with maximum irrigated land. The district utilises both surface water and groundwater for irrigation. In 2003–2004, 27.07% of the gross cropped area was under irrigation. 65.51% of the reported area was net sown area.

Operation Barga provided tenurial security and increased the share of produce in favour of the tenants. In the 1980s agricultural production reflected robust growth rates against stagnation in the previous decades. Horticulture, pisciculture, dairy etc. have successfully emerged as economically rewarding viable options for diversifying.

=== Industry and crafts ===
At the time of bifurcation of Bardhaman district in 2017, the mining and industrial areas of the district were placed in Paschim Bardhaman district and the Purba Bardhaman district was composed of rural/ agricultural areas. Purba Bardhaman district has some medium scale enterprises. Since it is an agro-based area, it has many rice mills. The other industries are: rice bran oil, cold storage, oil mill, chira mill, bakery, L.P.G. gas filling plant, transformer manufacturing/repairing, automobile spare parts etc. There is an industrial estate at Saktigarh. In a report by the Micro, Small and Medium Industries Development Institute, it says that the degree of excellence of products like, sola craft of Bankapasi and dhokra of Dwariapur is now acceptable to European markets. There are rural wood carving artisans who are maintain the continuity of their traditional art. Amongst the other crafts in Purba Bardhaman district are: clay craft, including terracotta work and idol making, wooden dolls, stone carving, bamboo and cane craft and kantha designing. There is a vibrant weaving network around Kalna, Dhatrigram and Samudragarh.

== Transport ==
The Howrah-Bardhaman main line and Howrah-Bardhaman chord, both part of Kolkata Suburban Railway system, enter this district and converge at Saktigarh railway station. The Bardhaman-Asansol section, which is part of Howrah-Delhi main line, Howrah-Gaya-Delhi line and Howrah-Allahabad-Mumbai line, and the Bardhaman-Kiul Sahibganj Loop leave at the other end of the district.

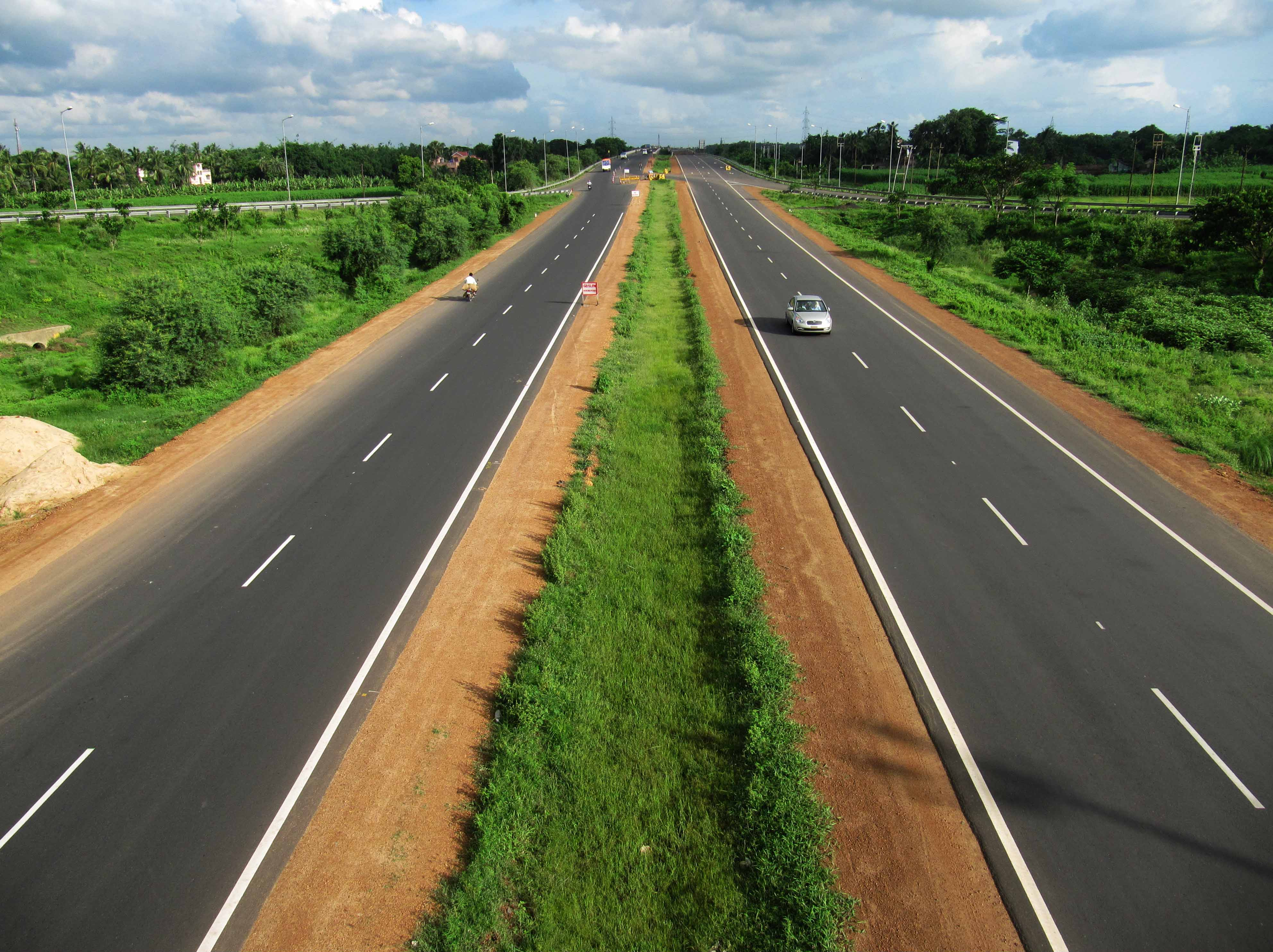
The Delhi-Kolkata NH 19

DEMU services are available on the Bankura-Masagram line.

The Bardhaman-Katwa line, after conversion from narrow gauge to electrified broad gauge, was opened to the public on 12 January 2018.

Kolkata-Agra National Highway 19 (old numbering NH 2), covering a large part of the old Grand Trunk Road passes through this district. The other highways passing through the district are: National Highway 114, State Highway 6, State Highway 7, State Highway 13 (covering a large part of the old Grand Trunk Road), State Highway 14 and State Highway 15.

== Education ==
Educational facilities in Purba Bardhaman district in 2013-14
Primary school–3,008
Middle school–127
High school–373
Higher secondary school–245
General degree college–19
University–1
Professional/ technical institutions–60
Institutions for non-formal education– 7,571

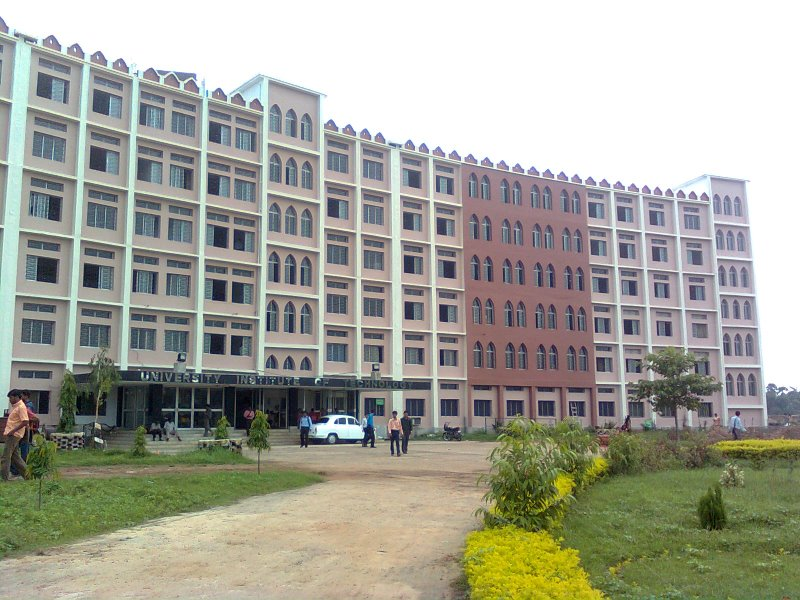
University Institute of Technology, Burdwan University

The first vernacular school in erstwhile Bardhaman district was set up by Captain Stuart in 1816. Prior to that there were chatuspathis and maktabs run by local pundits and maulavis. There also were Sanskrit tols, Persian and Arabic schools.

The box alongside provides information about educational facilities in Purba Bardhaman district, subsequent to bifurcation of the district in 2017, with data for 2013–2014. There were almost 250,000 students in the primary schools and more than 50,000 students studied at the college and university levels in the district. More than 6,000 schools (in erstwhile Bardhaman district) serve cooked midday meal to more than 900,000 students.

The infrastructure available is an important element in the education arena. The table below shows the availability and accessibility of facilities in rural areas of erstwhile Bardhaman district (percentage of villages within specified distance):

Indicator	Within village	Within 1 km	Beyond 1 km
Nearest primary school	92.7	4.1	3.3
Nearest middle school	28.5	27.6	43.9
Nearest secondary/ higher secondary school	16.3	10.0	73.7
Nearest college	1.6	0.8	97.6

97% of the primary schools have pucca buildings and 99% have sanitation facilities. All primary and high schools have drinking water facility. Availability of teachers per school are 3 in primary schools, 12 in secondary schools and 20 in higher secondary schools.

The University of Burdwan was founded in 1960, as part of Dr. B.C.Roy's master plan to expand the scope of higher education beyond the metropolis of Kolkata. The university was privileged to inherit a large part of the estate of the erstwhile Bardhaman Raj. Burdwan Raj College was established at Bardhaman in 1881. All other degree colleges in the district came up after independence. Amongst the specialized institutes are: Burdwan Medical College, University Institute of Technology, Burdwan University and College of Agriculture (Extended Campus of Bidhan Chandra Krishi Viswavidalaya) Meghnad Saha Planetarium was opened at Bardhaman in 1994.

== Literary traditions ==
Purba Bardhaman district has rich literary and cultural traditions. Kashiram Das well known for his Bengali adaptation of the Mahabharat was born in and lived in Purba Bardhaman district. Maladhar Basu, the author of শ্রীকৃষ্ণবিজয়, the Triumph of Lord Krishna, as well as poets of the Mangal-Kavya fame, such as Kavi Kankan Mukunda Ram Chakravarty, Ghanaram Chakrabarty and Rupram Chakrabarty belonged to Purba Bardhaman district. Vaisnava poets and saints such as Krishnadasa Kaviraja, author of Chaitanya Charitamrita, Brindabandas, Lochandas and Jnandas were born in this district. Purba Bardhaman district was home to such great scholars as Raghunandan Goswami, the famous logician, Ganga Kishore Bhattacharya of Bengal Gazetti fame and Lal Behari Dey of Bengal Peasant Life fame. Modern Bengali poets such as Kalidas Roy and Kumud Ranjan Mullick also made this district proud.

== Culture ==
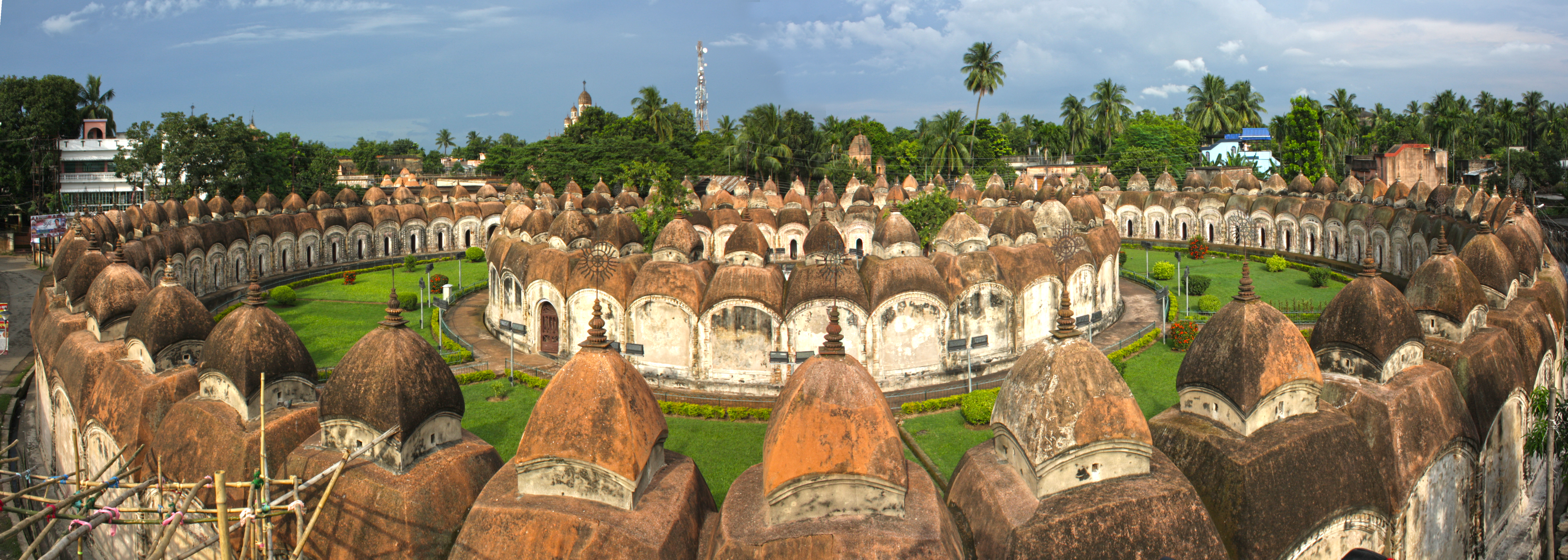
Nava-Kailasha Temple in Kalna

=== Festivals and fairs ===
The Bengali proverb baro masey tero parban (thirteen festivals in twelve months) indicates the abundance of festivities in the state. Durga Puja or Saradotsav, celebrated by Bengali Hindus, is the main festival in the state and the district. It is one of the largest festivals celebrated in the world. Other festivals are: Kali Puja, Saraswati Puja, Holi, Ratha-Yatra, Raksha Bandhan, Eid al-Fitr, Muharram, Christmas, Good Friday, Guru Nanak Gurpurab, Buddha Poornima and Mahavir Jayanti. In addition to these festivals organized throughout the state, there are local festivals, as for example Gajan of Dharmaraj and Gajan of Shiva.

Numerous fairs are held in Purba Bardhaman district. Researchers have been listing the fairs over the years. Dr. Asok Mitra had listed 369 fairs in Bardhaman district and Dr. Gopikanta Konar had listed 482 fairs. Information about some of the prominent fairs follows. A month-long fair is held around Makar Sankranti at Dadhia in Mongalkote PS. There is a Nangteswar Shiva fair during Maha Shivaratri at Babladihi. A week-long fair is held during Rama Navami at Kairapur in Ausgram PS. A fair is organised at Karui to celebrate the Gajan of Shiva on the last day of the Bengali month of Choitro. At Kaigram Kusumgram, Neredighi and Suata, Urs of a Pir is celebrated with fairs in the Bengali month of Falgun. The Santals organise a fair at Baidyapur during Aswin Nabami. A fair is organised during Bhadu Utsab in the Bengali month of Bhadro at Sitahati in Ketugram PS. There are many more fairs in the district.

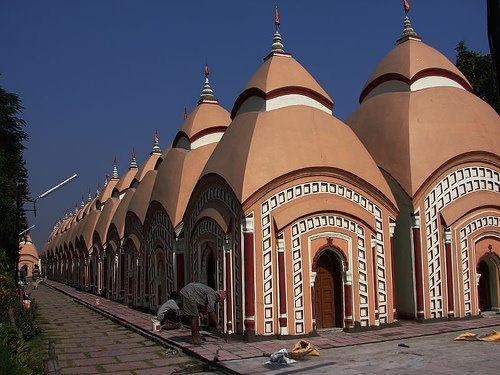
108 Shiva Temple

=== Religion related institutions ===
Purba Bardhaman district had rich religious traditions. The religion related institutions draw in large number of pilgrims/ tourists. The temple of the deity of Sarbamangala, the presiding deity of the Bardhaman Raj is at Bardhaman. Kamalakanta Kalibari is a Kali temple associated with the poet-devotee Kamalakanta. The 108 Shiva temple complex has a picturesque setting located near Bardhaman. The idol at Babladihi is of archaeological interest as it is believed to have been built in the Pala era. Christ Church Bardhaman, the oldest church in the district is in Bardhaman town.

Katwa had close association with Chaitanya Mahaprabhu and so the area has notable Vaishnavism religious centres. Sree Gouranga Mandir is believed to have been visited by Chaitanya Mahaprabhu. The ashram at Madhaitala has links with Jagai and Madhai, two famous disciples of Chaitanya Mahaprabhu. Kalna, is another place with Vaishanavism associations. There are popular temples attracting devotees – Gouranga temple, 109 Shiva temples (also called Naba Kailash) and Kashinath Shiva temple. The temple of Sddheswari Ambika, the presiding goddess, and Baikunthanath Shiva temple, are notable for their terracotta decorations.

Shah Alam's Dargah, built in the early 18th century by Murshid Quli Khan is a place of archaeological interest. The Jima Masjid was constructed by Azim-us-Shan, subedar of Bengal, in the last part of the 17th century. The tomb of Bahman Pir and its adjoining dargah, in Ausgram II CD block, is popular with all communities.

== Healthcare ==
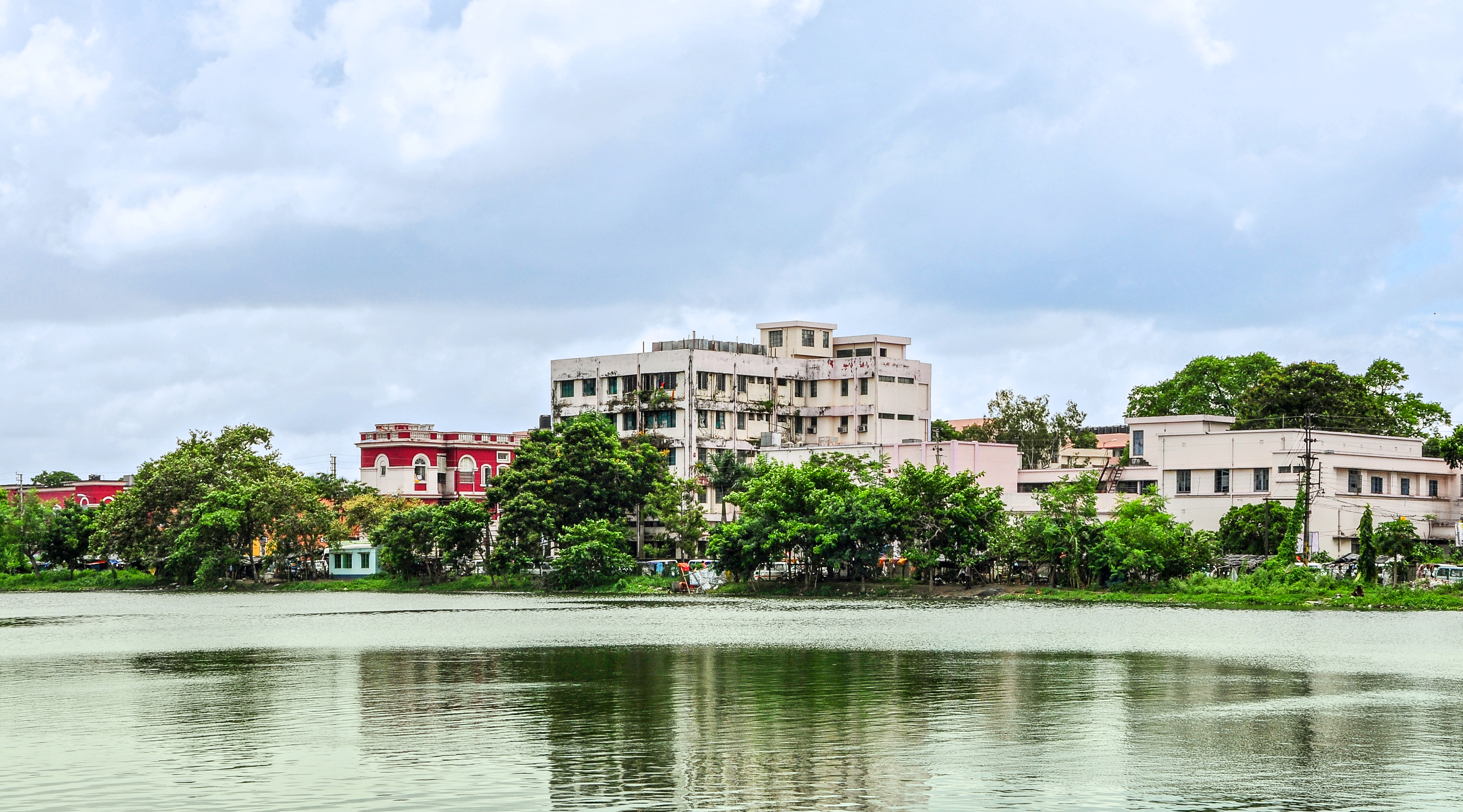
Bardhaman Medical College Hospital

The health infrastructure in Purba Bardhaman district, as per 2013-14 data, can be summed up as follows: 3 hospitals, 5 rural hospitals, 19 block primary health centres, and 74 primary health centres. These facilities are provided by the Health and Family Welfare department of the Government of West Bengal. Additionally 2 medical units are provided by other departments of the state government, 1 medical unit by the Central Government/ PSUs and there are 109 private nursing homes.

The district had 4,360 hospital beds. Out of this 1,105 beds were in the medical college at Bardhaman and 809 beds were in the four subdivisional towns and the balance in the rural areas in 2005–2006.

The rural areas of Purba Bardhaman district are flooded frequently and that affects health. Some blocks near the Bhagirathi have been facing the problem of arsenic contamination in ground water.

In 2001, in most of the blocks, even 25% of the households did not have individual sanitation latrines but since then the situation has improved and the district had been moving towards the 100% target. The district has become a nirmal jilla. The availability of safe drinking water is also moving towards the 100% target.

Public healthcare is no longer an illusion for the poor. The district has come a long way from the colonial era. However, the scenario of undernourished mothers and babies has not vanished even in the 21st century. Health for all, the clarion call of world bodies, still remains to be achieved.

== Electoral constituencies ==
The last delimitation of electoral constituencies in West Bengal was done in 2006, The last general election for Lok Sabha was held in 2019 and for Vidhan Sabha in 2016.

=== Assembly constituencies ===
No.	Name	Lok Sabha	MLA	2026 Winner	2024 Lead
259	Khandaghosh (SC)	Bishnupur	Nabin Chandra Bag	Trinamool Congress	Trinamool Congress
260	Bardhaman Dakshin	Bardhaman–Durgapur	Moumita Biswas Mishra	Bharatiya Janata Party	Trinamool Congress
261	Raina (SC)	Bardhaman Purba	Subhash Patra	Bharatiya Janata Party	Trinamool Congress
262	Jamalpur (SC)	Bardhaman Purba	Arun Halder	Bharatiya Janata Party	Trinamool Congress
263	Monteswar	Bardhaman–Durgapur	Saikat Panja	Bharatiya Janata Party	Trinamool Congress
264	Kalna (SC)	Bardhaman Purba	Siddhartha Majumdar	Bharatiya Janata Party	Trinamool Congress
265	Memari	Bardhaman Purba	Manab Guha	Bharatiya Janata Party	Trinamool Congress
266	Bardhaman Uttar (SC)	Bardhaman–Durgapur	Nisith Kumar Malik	Trinamool Congress	Trinamool Congress
267	Bhatar	Bardhaman–Durgapur	Soumen Karfa	Bharatiya Janata Party	Trinamool Congress
268	Purbasthali Dakshin	Bardhaman Purba	Prankrishna Tapadar	Bharatiya Janata Party	Trinamool Congress
269	Purbasthali Uttar	Bardhaman Purba	Gopal Chattopadhyay	Bharatiya Janata Party	Trinamool Congress
270	Katwa	Bardhaman Purba	Krishna Ghosh	Bharatiya Janata Party	Trinamool Congress
271	Ketugram	Bolpur	Anadi Ghosh	Bharatiya Janata Party	Trinamool Congress
272	Mangalkot	Bolpur	Shishir Ghosh	Bharatiya Janata Party	Trinamool Congress
273	Ausgram (SC)	Bolpur	Kalita Maji	Bharatiya Janata Party	Trinamool Congress
274	Galsi (SC)	Bardhaman–Durgapur	Raju Patra	Bharatiya Janata Party	Trinamool Congress

The Bardhaman Purba Lok Sabha constituency with its seven assembly segments - Raina (SC), Jamalpur (SC), Kalna (SC), Memari, Purbasthali Dakshin, Purbasthali Uttar and Katwa – is located in Purba Bardhaman district.

The Bardhaman-Durgapur (Lok Sabha constituency), has four assembly segments in Purba Bardhaman district - Bardhaman Dakshin, Bardhaman Uttar (SC), Monteswar and Bhatar – and three in Paschim Bardhaman district.

Ketugram, Mangalkot, and Ausgram (SC), all three assembly constituencies of Purba Bardhaman district, are part of Bolpur (Lok Sabha constituency) with four other assembly segments in Birbhum district.

Khandaghosh (SC), located in Purba Bardhaman district, is part of Bishnupur (Lok Sabha constituency) with six other assembly segments in Bankura district.

== Notable people ==
- Zamindar family of Kashiara
  - Nawab Abdul Jabbar (1837–1918), bureaucrat and deputy magistrate
  - Abul Kasem (1872–1936), politician
  - Abul Hashim (1905–1974), politician
  - Badruddin Umar (born 1931), Marxist–Leninist theorist and political activist
- Konar family
  - Hare Krishna Konar (1915–1974), Indian Marxist revolutionary and politician
  - Benoy Krishna Konar (1930–2014), Indian politician
  - Maharani Konar (1933–2024), Indian politician
- Chowdhury family
  - Chowdhury Abu Taleb (died 1971), politician
  - Siddiqullah Chowdhury (born 1949), Islamic scholar and politician
- Ahmad family of Kulia (Raina)
  - Ekramuddin Ahmad (1872–1940), author and activist
  - Naziruddin Ahmad (born 1889), member of the Constituent Assembly of India
- Mondal family of Galsi
  - Idrish Mondal, politician
  - Mehbub Mondal (born 1966), politician
- Syed family
  - Syed Abul Mansur Habibullah (1917–1996), Law Minister of West Bengal
  - Dr. Syeda Mamtaz Sanghamita (born 1946), gynaecologist
- Abdullah al-Baqi [Tubgram] (1886–1952), Islamic scholar and member of the Central Legislative Assembly
- Syed Abdus Samad [Bhuri] (1895–1964), footballer
- Abdul Halim [Keuburi] (1901–1966), member of the West Bengal Legislative Council
- Mohammed Abdullah Rasul (1903–1991), politician and author
- Kazi Kader Newaj (1909–1983), poet
- Janab Abdus Sattar [Tola] (1911–1965), politician
- Abu Mohammed Habibullah (1911–1983), historian and former President of Bangla Academy
- Syed Shahedullah [Burdwan] (1913–1991), politician and author
- Habibur Rahman [Palishgram] (1923–1976), poet
- Munshi Mohammad Fazle Kader [Ketugram] (1928–2019), civil servant
- Mahboob Zahedi (1929–2006), politician and soldier of Indian National Army
- Syed Hasan Imam (born 1935), actor
- Nur Alam Ziku [Haripur] (1938–2010), politician and filmmaker
- Mokbula Manzoor [Kalna] (1938–2020), novelist
- Hasan Azizul Huq [Jabagram] (1939–2021), short-story writer and novelist
- Kazi Abu Zafar Mohammed Hasan Siddiqui (1940–2012), activist
- Abu Ayesh Mondal [Akbarnagar] (born 1944), politician
- Sayed Md Masih [Bhatar] (born 1944), politician
- Saifuddin Choudhury [Memari] (1952–2014), politician
- Sekh Sahonawez (born 1958), politician
- Sheikh Saidul Haque [Jagulipara] (born 1954), academic and politician
- Nurul Islam Mollah [Kalna], politician
- Mollah Humayun Kabir [Purbasthali], politician
- Nurunnesa Sattar [Purbasthali], politician
- Mohammad Hossain [Khandaghosh], politician
- Abul Hasem Mondal [Kantipur], politician
- Nargis Begum, politician
- Maladhar Basu, Bengali poet of 15th century
- Rajshekhar Basu, Bengali writer, chemist and lexicographer better known by his pen name Parashuram
- Sadhak Kamalakanta Bhattacharya, Bengali Shakta poet and yogi of India
- Rash Behari Bose, Indian revolutionary leader known for organising Indian National Army
- Ghanaram Chakrabarty, Bengali poet of the early modern period
- Batukeshwar Dutt, Indian socialist revolutionary and independence fighter
- Satyendranath Dutta, Bengali poet
- Rash Behari Ghosh, Indian politician, lawyer, social worker and philanthropist. The street Rashbehari Avenue in Kolkata was named after him.
- Somai Kisku, Indian writer in Santali language
- Partha Sarathi Mukherjee, Indian Scientist
- Shakti Samanta, famous Indian film director
- Sukumar Sen, Bengali linguist and historian of the Bengali literature
- Rabindranath Tagore, Nobel laureate, Bengali poet, writer, playwright, composer, philosopher, social reformer and painter whose ancestral village was Kush in this district

== See also ==
- List of villages in Purba Bardhaman district
