= Nurunnesa Sattar =

West Bengal politician

Member of West Bengal Legislative Assembly
- In office 1972–1977
- Preceded by: Mollah Humayun Kabir
- Succeeded by: Manoranjan Nath
- Constituency: Purbasthali Dakshin

Personal details
- Born: Purbasthali, Bardhaman district, Bengal Presidency
- Party: Indian National Congress

Nurunnesa Sattar is an Indian politician belonging to the Indian National Congress. He was the MLA of Purbasthali Dakshin Assembly constituency in the West Bengal Legislative Assembly.

== Early life and family ==
Nurunnesa was born into a Bengali Muslim family in Purbasthali, Bardhaman district, Bengal Presidency. She is the daughter of Abdul Sattar Miah.

== Career ==
Kabir contested in the 1972 West Bengal Legislative Assembly election where she ran as an Indian National Congress candidate for Purbasthali Dakshin Assembly constituency.
