= Ekramuddin Ahmad =

Bengali litterateur

- একরামুদ্দীন আহমদ
- Born: 1872; Raina I, Burdwan district, Bengal Presidency
- Died: 20 November 1940 (aged 67–68); Kaitha, Birbhum district, Bengal Province
- Occupation: Litterateur

Ekramuddin Ahmad (1872 – 20 November 1940) was a Bengali government officer and litterateur. He was known for his support of the Santal people during his government service and his literary criticisms after retirement.

== Early life and education ==
Ahmad was born in 1872, to a Bengali Muslim family in the village of Kulia in Raina, Burdwan district, Bengal Presidency. His father, Mahtabuddin Ahmad, was a village doctor. In 1892 he graduated from Burdwan High School and in 1894 he passed the FA exams from Burdwan Raj College. He also studied at Hooghly College for the BA degree but dropped out before completion.

== Career ==
Ahmad started working as a surveyor for the government in 1896 and was subsequently promoted to sub-deputy collector. He wrote a report in 1918 on the repression and exploitation by zamindars (land owners) of Santal people in Birbhum. The report bought government attention to the repression of the Santals. He did not always have police support in his effort highlight the rights of Santals. He retired from government service in 1927.

Ahmad gained renown as a literary critic and author. He was one of the leading Muslim commentators on the work of Tagore and in 1914 wrote Robindro-Protibha (or The Genius of Tagore). He also wrote volumes of literary criticism on Michael Madhusudan Dutt and Bankim Chandra Chattopadhyay. He wrote several novels, among them the romantic novel Kaanch o Moni (1919). His novels were serialized in Saogat and Mohammadi, both of which were important Bengali Muslim literary journals of the period. He was also a humorist, essayist and short story writer, and one of his stories "Bhikkhuk" (or "The Beggar") was a set text in secondary schools in East Pakistan.

== Death ==
Ekramuddin Ahmad died on 20 November 1940, and was buried in the village of Kaitha in Birbhum, Bengal.
