= Anadi Ghosh =

Indian politician

Member of the West Bengal Legislative Assembly
- Incumbent
- Assumed office May 2026
- Preceded by: Sekh Sahonawez
- Constituency: Ketugram

Personal details
- Party: Bharatiya Janata Party
- Profession: Politician

Anadi Ghosh (Mathura) is an Indian politician from West Bengal. He is a member of West Bengal Legislative Assembly, from Ketugram Assembly constituency.
