= Burdwan Raj College =

College in West Bengal

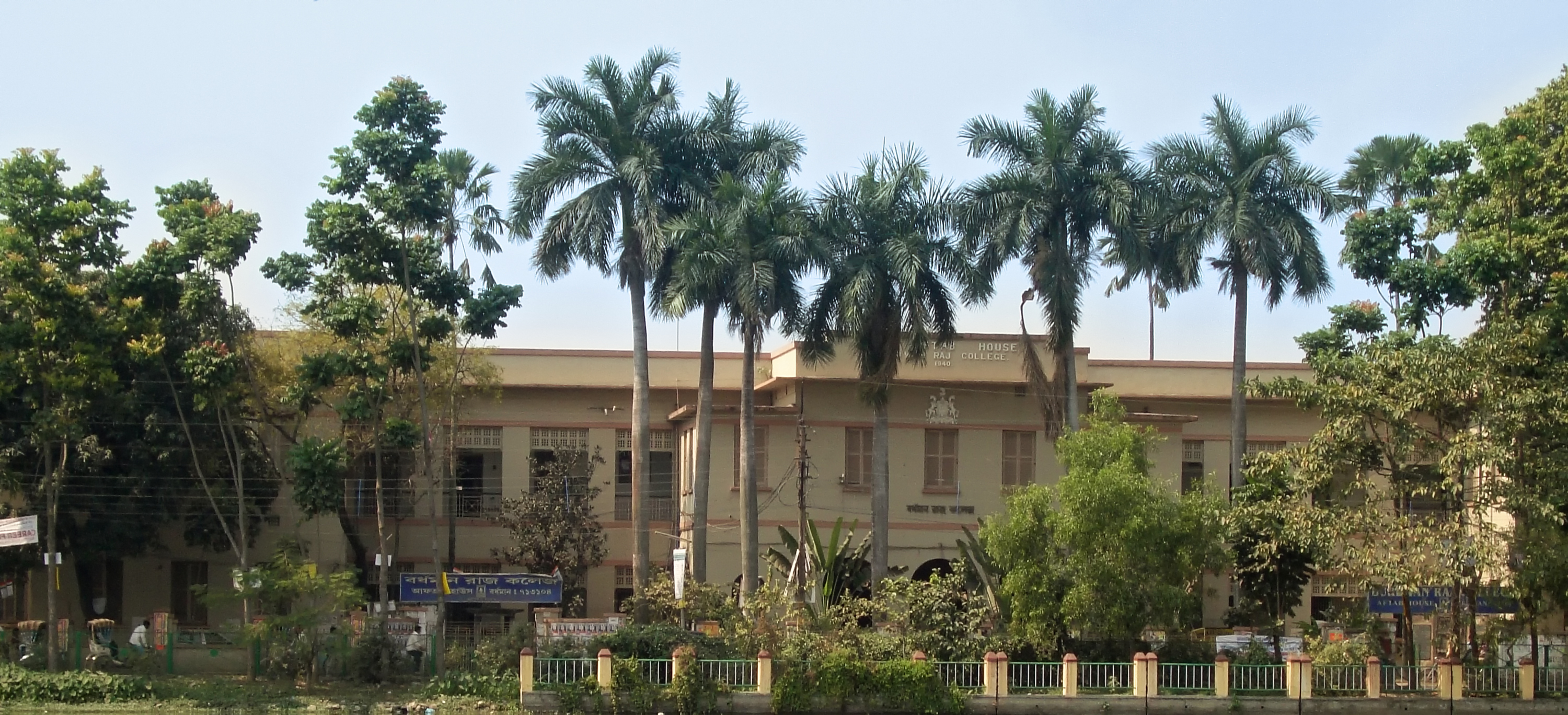
- Type: Public
- Established: 1881; 145 years ago
- Affiliations: University of Burdwan
- Principal: Dr. Bijoy Chand (acting)
- Location: Bardhaman, West Bengal, India; 23°14′44.59″N 87°51′19.40″E
- Campus: Urban
- Website: burdwanrajcollege.ac.in

- Location within West Bengal Location within India

Burdwan Raj College, established in 1881, is the oldest state-governed college in Purba Bardhaman district catering to the district and neighboring areas of Bankura district, Purulia district, Hooghly district and Birbhum district. It offers undergraduate courses in arts, commerce and sciences and a post-graduate course in Bengali. It is affiliated to the University of Burdwan.

== History ==
In 1817, Maharaj Tej Chand established an Anglo-vernacular school in his palace at Burdwan. In 1854, Maharaja Mahatab Chand extended and renamed the school "High English School". In 1881, when Aftab Chand became the Maharaja of Burdwan, he shifted the school to Natunganj and introduced Liberal Arts courses in accordance with the permission of the University of Calcutta. The school became named as "Raj Collegiate School" and the college "Burdwan Raj College". This chief educational institution of Burdwan is entirely supported out of the maharaja's estate.

The royal patronage of Burdwan Raj College was taken over by the government of West Bengal in 1956 under the sponsoring scheme, and its necessary parting from the University of Calcutta became effective. Burdwan Raj College was affiliated to the University of Burdwan in 1960.

Mrityunjay Sil was the officer-in-charge. He served from 1991 to 1993 and made Burdwan Raj College rise to new heights — it was the number 1 college of West Bengal at that time and 21st at the All-India Level.

== Shifts ==
- Morning: Undergraduate General course classes for Arts, Commerce, Science

Honours classes for Hindi, Music and Education Honours.

- Day: Undergraduate General and Honours course classes for Arts and Science.
- Evening: Undergraduate General and Honours course classes for Commerce.

== Departments and courses ==
The college offers different undergraduate and postgraduate courses and aims at imparting education to the undergraduates of lower- and middle-class people of Burdwan and its adjoining areas.

=== Science ===
Science faculty consists of the departments of Chemistry, Physics, Mathematics, Statistics, Computer Science & Application, Botany, Zoology, Physiology, Electronics, and Economics.

=== Arts & Commerce ===
Arts and Commerce faculty consists of departments of Bengali, English, Sanskrit, Hindi, History, Geography, Political Science, Philosophy, Music, Education, Sociology, Commerce (Accountancy), and Business Administration.

== Admission ==
Admission to the first-year undergraduate classes are usually held after the publication of the result of the Higher Secondary Examination under the West Bengal Council of Higher Secondary Education and is based strictly on merit through open counseling procedure.

Admission in the college can be get through WBCAP Portal June/July every year.

== Accreditation ==
The college is recognized by the University Grants Commission (UGC). It is accredited by the National Assessment and Accreditation Council (NAAC), and awarded B++ grade in 2016.

== Alumni ==
- Ekramuddin Ahmad, Bengali litterateur
- Abul Hashim, freedom fighter and politician
- Sukumar Sen (linguist)

== See also ==
- List of institutions of higher education in West Bengal
- Education in India
- Education in West Bengal
