= Nadanghat Assembly constituency =

Coordinates: 23.37°N 88.25°E

Nadanghat
- Former constituency No. 277 for the West Bengal Legislative Assembly

Constituency details
- Country: India
- Region: East India
- State: West Bengal
- District: Purba Bardhaman
- Lok Sabha constituency: Katwa
- Established: 1967
- Abolished: 2011
- Reservation: None

Nadanghat Assembly constituency was an assembly constituency in Purba Bardhaman district in the Indian state of West Bengal.

== Overview ==
As per orders of the Delimitation Commission, Nadanghat Assembly constituency ceased to exist from 2011.

Nadanghat assembly constituency was part of Katwa (Lok Sabha constituency).

== Election results ==
Swapan Debnath of Trinamool Congress won the Nadanghat assembly seat in 2006 defeating his nearest rival Ratan Das of CPI (M). In 2001, Ratan Das of CPI (M) defeated Swapan Debnath of Trinamool Congress. In 1996 and 1991, Biren Ghosh of CPI (M) defeated Swapan Debnath of Congress and Paresh Chandra Goswami in respective years. In 1987, 1982 and 1977 Syed Abul Mansur Habibullah of CPI (M) defeated Swapan Debnath, Paresh Chandra Goswami and Biswanath Basu, all of Congress, in the respective years.

In 1972, Paresh Chandra Goswami of Congress won the seat. In 1971 and 1969, Syed Mansur Habibullah of CPI (M) won the seat. P.C.Goswami of INC won the seat in 1967. Prior to that the Nadanghat seat was not there.
