= Purbasthali Dakshin Assembly constituency =

Purbasthali Dakshin
- Constituency No. 268 for the West Bengal Legislative Assembly
- Interactive Map Outlining Purbasthali Dakshin Assembly Constituency

Constituency details
- Country: India
- Region: East India
- State: West Bengal
- District: Purba Bardhaman
- Lok Sabha constituency: Bardhaman Purba
- Established: 1951
- Total electors: 190,763
- Reservation: None

Member of Legislative Assembly
- 18th West Bengal Legislative Assembly
- Incumbent Prankrishna Tapadar
- Party: BJP
- Alliance: NDA
- Elected year: 2026

Purbasthali Dakshin Assembly constituency is an assembly constituency in Purba Bardhaman district in the Indian state of West Bengal.

== Overview ==
As a consequence of the orders of the Delimitation Commission, No. 268 Purbasthali Dakshin Assembly constituency covers Nandai, Kankuria, Begpur, Atghoria Simlan, Dhatrigram and Sultanpur gram panchayats of Kalna I community development block and Nasratpur, Samudragarh, Bogpur, Sreerampur and Nadanghat gram panchayats of Purbasthali I community development block.

As per orders of Delimitation Commission, Purbasthali Dakshin Assembly constituency is part of No. 38 Bardhaman Purba Lok Sabha constituency.

Following are the members of the legislative assembly from Purbasthali Dakshin Assembly constituency over the years.

== Members of the Legislative Assembly ==
Year	Name	Party
Purbasthali
1951	Bimalananda Tarkatirtha	Indian National Congress
1957	Bimalananda Tarkatirtha	Indian National Congress
1962	Bimalananda Tarkatirtha	Indian National Congress
1967	Lalit Mohan Hazra	Communist Party of India (Marxist)
1969	Mollah Humayun Kabir	Communist Party of India (Marxist)
1971	Mollah Humayun Kabir	Communist Party of India (Marxist)
1972	Nurunnesa Sattar	Indian National Congress
1977	Manoranjan Nath	Communist Party of India (Marxist)
1982	Manoranjan Nath	Communist Party of India (Marxist)
1987	Manoranjan Nath	Communist Party of India (Marxist)
1991	Manoranjan Nath	Communist Party of India (Marxist)
1996	Himanshu Dutta	Communist Party of India (Marxist)
2001	Subrata Bhowal	Communist Party of India (Marxist)
2006	Subrata Bhowal	Communist Party of India (Marxist)
Purbasthali Dakshin
2011	Swapan Debnath	Trinamool Congress
2016	Swapan Debnath	Trinamool Congress
2021	Swapan Debnath	Trinamool Congress
2026	Prankrishna Tapadar	Bharatiya Janata Party

== Election results ==
=== 2026 ===
2026 West Bengal Legislative Assembly election: Purbasthali Dakshin
Party	Candidate	Votes	%	±%
BJP	Prankrishna Tapadar	111,004	50.44	▲9.44
AITC	Swapan Debnath	94,342	42.87	▼6.21
CPI(ML)L	Jiyadul Sekh	7,282	3.31	
INC	Rabindranath Mondal	2,843	1.29	▼5.7
NOTA	None of the above	1,923	0.87	▲0.14
Majority		16,662	7.57	▼0.51
Turnout		220,056	94.5	▲7.85
BJP gain from AITC		Swing		

=== 2021 ===
2021 West Bengal Legislative Assembly election: Purbasthali Dakshin
Party	Candidate	Votes	%	±%
AITC	Swapan Debnath	105,698	49.08	▼3.77
BJP	Rajib Kumar Bhowmick	88,288	41.0	▲31.38
INC	Abhijit Bhattacharya	15,061	6.99	▼26.79
BSP	Surajit Mondal	3,105	1.44	▲0.76
NOTA	None of the above	1,562	0.73	
Majority		17,410	8.08	
Turnout		215,353	86.65	
AITC hold		Swing		

=== 2016 ===
2016 West Bengal Legislative Assembly election: Purbasthali Dakshin
Party	Candidate	Votes	%	±%
AITC	Swapan Debnath	104,398	52.85	▲3.13
INC	Abhijit Bhattacharya	66,732	33.78	New entry
BJP	Rajib Kumar Bhowmick	19,003	9.62	▲3.40
NOTA	None of the above	1,916	0.97	New entry
PDS	Nasimul Gani Sayed	1,555	0.79	▼0.18
CPI(ML)L	Jiyadul Seikh	1,318	0.67	▼0.13
BSP	Manoranjan Boll	1,223	0.62	▼0.06
Majority		37,666	19.07	▲9.91
Turnout		1,97,543	88.08	▼2.39
AITC hold		Swing		

=== 2011 ===
2011 West Bengal Legislative Assembly election: Purbasthali Dakshin
Party	Candidate	Votes	%	±%
AITC	Swapan Debnath	86,039	49.72	
CPI(M)	Aleya Begam Sekh	70,181	40.56	
BJP	Mahadeb Basak	10,765	6.22	
Independent	Ram Hansda	1,818	1.05	
PDS	Badredojja Molla	1,676	0.97	
CPI(ML)L	Irai Sekh	1,385	0.80	
BSP	Kanai Lal Pandey	1,172	0.68	
Majority		15,858	9.16	
Turnout		1,73,036	90.47	
AITC win (new seat)				
