= Sekh Sahonawez =

Indian politician

Sekh Sahonawez is an Indian politician with the Trinamool Congress party, who is accused of murder in three cases and of attempted murder, kidnapping and other crimes in a number of other charges.

In May 2011, he won the Ketugram seat in the 2011 West Bengal state assembly election, and became the state legislative representative for the area. Ketugram has faced increasing violence in recent months owing to clashes between Trinamool and the CPI-M parties.

The Trinamool party leader Mamata Banerjee has come under attack for fielding as many as 69 persons with criminal antecedents.
