= Manoranjan Nath =

Indian politician

MLA of Purbasthali Vidhan Sabha Constituency
- In office 1977–1996
- Preceded by: Nurunnesa Sattar
- Succeeded by: Himangshu Dutta

Personal details
- Party: Communist Party of India

Manoranjan Nath is an Indian politician belonging to Communist Party of India (Marxist). He was elected as MLA of Purbasthali Vidhan Sabha Constituency in West Bengal Legislative Assembly in 1977, 1982, 1987 and 1991.
