= Purbasthali =

- Village
- Location in West Bengal, India Purbasthali (India)
- Coordinates: 23.4668°N 88.3329°E
- Country: India
- State: West Bengal
- District: Purba Bardhaman

Population (2011)
  - Total: 4,207

Languages
  - Official: Bengali, English
- Time zone: UTC+5:30 (IST)
- PIN: 713513
- Lok Sabha constituency: Bardhaman Purba
- Vidhan Sabha constituency: Purbasthali Dakshin, Purbasthali Uttar
- Website: bardhaman.gov.in

Purbasthali is a village in the Purba Bardhaman district of West Bengal, India. It is located 120 km north from Kolkata. Also known as Chupi Char, it lies on the banks of a large oxbow lake created by the Ganges river and is only 8 km from the town of Nabadwip. The 2–3 km long lake attracts migrants and water birds. The Purbasthali area has a fairly high level of arsenic in the ground water. Kartik Puja is the biggest festival of Purbasthali.

== Demographics ==
As per the 2011 Census of India, Purbasthali had a total population of 4,207 of which 2,128 (51%) were males and 2,079 (49%) were females. Population below 6 years was 379. The total number of literates in Purbasthali was 3,215 (83.99% of the population over 6 years).

== Geography ==
Cities and towns in the Kalna subdivision of Purba Bardhaman district
M: municipal city/ town, CT: census town, R: rural/ urban centre, H: historical/ religious cetre, C: craft centre.
Owing to space constraints in the small map, the actual locations in a larger map may vary slightly

=== Location ===
Purbasthali lies close on the Tropic of Cancer. Purbasthali is a large block with a number of villages adjoining a large oxbow lake, created by the river Ganga, on its Western bank, in Purba Bardhaman district of West Bengal. It is 120 km north from Calcutta. On the Eastern bank of the river lies the town of Nabadwip. The entire Gangetic Isle complex of Purbasthali extends between the geographical coordinates from 88° 19' 45" to 88° 22' E longitude and 23° 26' to 23° 26'45" N latitude.

=== Police station ===
Purbasthali police station has jurisdiction over parts of Purbasthali I and Purbasthali II CD Blocks. The area covered is 180.3 km^{2}.

=== Physiography ===
Purbasthali is located on the agriculturally rich alluvial plains between the Bhagirathi, Ajay and Damodar rivers. Temperatures in this region varies from 17-18 °C in winter to 30-32 °C in summer.

=== The Oxbow Lake ===
The oxbow lake of Purbasthali has an area of 3.50 square kilometres (1.35 sq mi) in the post monsoon winter months. Beyond the lake the river fed eco-system also forms a cluster of larger and smaller islands comprising Purbasthali Gangetic Isle Complex.

== Transport ==
Purbasthali railway station is on the Bandel-Katwa Branch Line of Eastern Railway.

== Notable people ==
- Upendranath Brahmachari (1873–1941), medical scientist, hailed from Purbasthali.
- Satyendranath dutta
- Ganga Kishore Bhattacharya
- Chandi Lahiri
- Krishnanath Nyayapanchanan (1833–1911) Sanskrit scholar, authority in Nyaya, Mimangsa and other branches of Indian philosophy
- Baneswar Sarkar won the national award for weaving in 1998.
- Krishnadasa Kaviraja, writer.
- Batukeshawar Dutta-was an Indian Bengali revolutionary and independence fighter in the early 1900s. He and Bhagat Singh set off bombs in the Central Legislative Assembly in New Delhi on 8 April 1929. After they were arrested, tried and imprisoned for life, they went on a hunger strike against the abusive treatment of Indian political prisoners, for whom they eventually secured some rights. He was a member of the Hindustan Socialist Republican Association
- Monoranjan Nath, politician

== See also ==
- Healthcare in West Bengal
