= Kalna =

Kalna may refer to several places:

- Kalna, India, a city in West Bengal, India
  - Kalna (Vidhan sabha constituency)
- Kalna, Poland, a village in Poland
- Kalna (Crna Trava), a village in Serbia in the Crna Trava municipality
- Kalna (Knjaževac), a village in Serbia in the Knjaževac municipality
- Kálna, the Hungarian name for Calna village, Vad, Cluj, Romania
- Kalna Parish, Latvia

== Others ==
- Kalna College
- Kalna General College
- Kalna Manor
- Kalna Polytechnic
