= Jan Szkodoń =

Polish Roman Catholic bishop (1946–2025)

His Excellency Jan Szkodoń
- Auxiliary Bishop Emeritus of Kraków
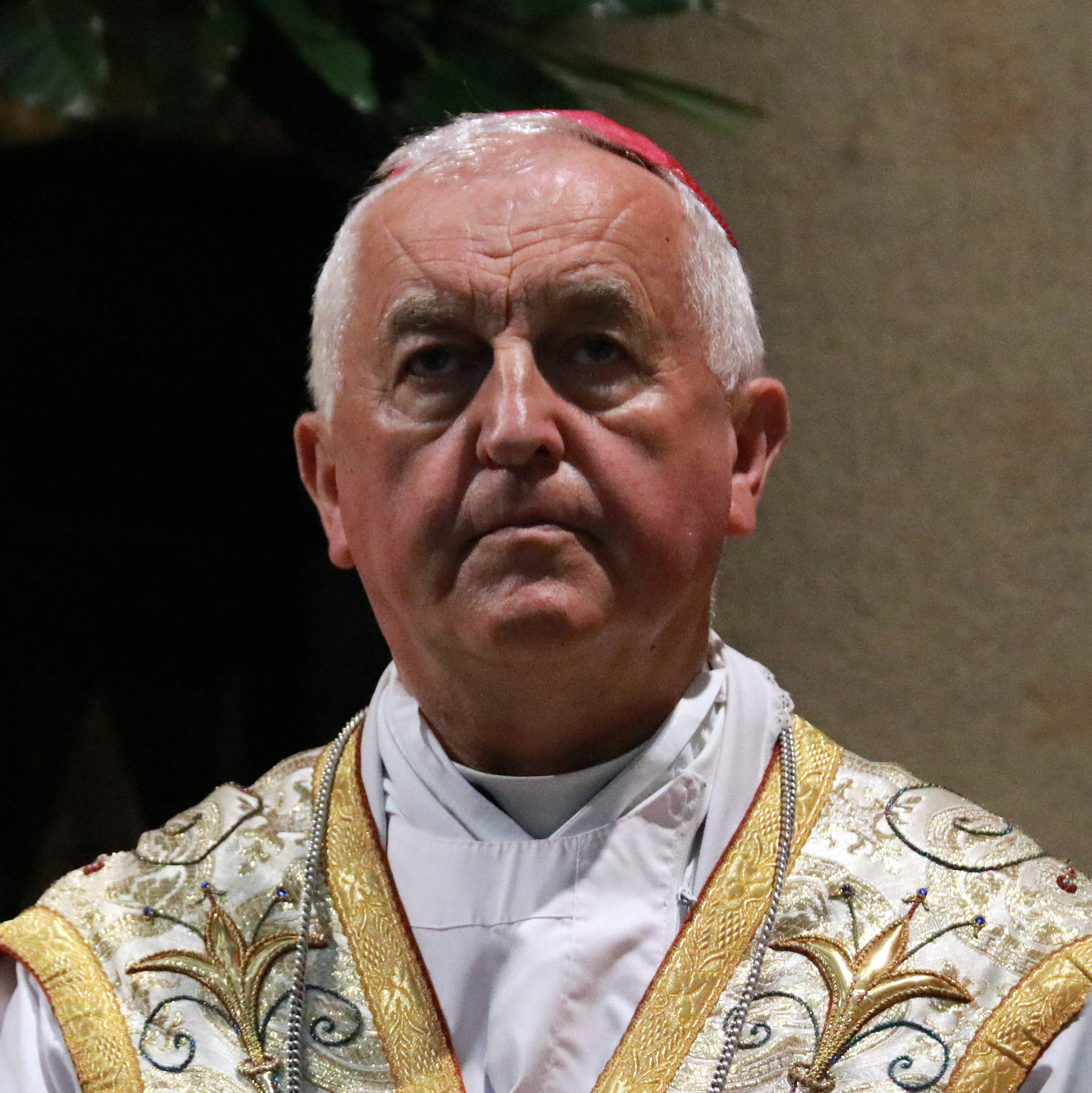
- Szkodoń in 2018
- Archdiocese: Kraków
- Appointed: 14 May 1988
- Term ended: 10 March 2022
- Other post: Titular Bishop of Turrisblanda (1988–2025)

Orders
- Ordination: 22 March 1970 by Karol Wojtyła
- Consecration: 4 June 1988 by Franciszek Macharski

Personal details
- Born: 19 December 1946 Chyżne, Poland
- Died: 28 August 2025 (aged 78) Kraków, Poland
- Motto: Dominus ipse faciet
- Coat of arms

Styles of Jan Szkodoń
- Reference style: His Excellency; The Most Reverend
- Spoken style: Your Excellency
- Religious style: Bishop

Jan Stefan Szkodoń (19 December 1946 – 28 August 2025) was a Polish Roman Catholic bishop.

== Biography ==
Szkodoń was born in Chyżne on 19 December 1946. Between 1960 and 1964 he attended high school in Jabłonka, and in 1964 he passed his secondary school leaving exam. Between 1964 and 1970 he studied philosophy and theology at the Pontifical Faculty of Theology in Krakow, at the same time gaining priestly formation at the local Metropolitan Major Seminary. He was ordained a priest on 22 March 1970 in the Church of the Transfiguration in Jabłonka by Cardinal Karol Wojtyla, Archbishop of Krakow. He obtained his master's degree in 1972 at the Pontifical Faculty of Theology in Krakow. Between the years 1973–1976 he completed specialist studies in theology and family pedagogy at the Pastoral Institute at the Catholic University of Lublin. He graduated with a doctorate in theology on the basis of his dissertation entitled The Indissolubility of Marriage as a Pastoral Problem of the Church in Poland in the Years 1946–1970.

As a priest, he worked in the years 1970–1972 in the parish of the Transfiguration of the Lord in Maków Podhalański, then in the years 1972–1973 in the parish of Our Lady of Victory in Krakow. In the years 1977–1979 he was the secretary of the Second Pastoral Synod of the Archdiocese of Krakow. He led retreats in parishes and for Apostolic Groups and the Light-Life Movement.

In 1977, he began lecturing on pastoral theology at the Krakow seminary, and in the years 1979–1988 he held the position of spiritual father. In 1977 he became a lecturer in pastoral theology, and in 1984 in theology of interior life at the Pontifical Faculty of Theology in Krakow (from 1981 the Pontifical Academy of Theology), where he also became the director of the Vicar Study. He also lectured on pastoral theology at the Sosnowiec Major Seminary in Krakow.

On 14 May 1988, he was preconized auxiliary bishop of the Archdiocese of Krakow with the titular see of Turrisblanda. He was ordained a bishop on 4 June 1988 in the Archcathedral Basilica of St. Stanislaus and St. Wenceslaus in Krakow. They were given to him by Cardinal Franciszek Macharski, Archbishop Metropolitan of Kraków, assisted by Archbishop Jerzy Abalewicz, Diocesan Bishop of Tarnów, and Stanisław Nowak, Diocesan Bishop of Częstochowa. As a bishop's motto, he adopted the words "Dominus ipse faciet" (The Lord, He Himself will act). In the archdiocese he took the office of vicar general, became an ecclesiastical censor, a member of the pastoral council and a college of consultors. In the Kraków cathedral chapter he took over the function of dean. In 2006, he became the chairman of the theological and pastoral commission "Memory and Care", dealing with the vetting of priests of the Archdiocese of Krakow. On 10 March 2022, Pope Francis accepted his resignation from his duties as auxiliary bishop of Krakow.

Within the framework of the Polish Episcopal Conference, he became a member of the Charity Commission, the Commission for Family Ministry the Commission for Missions, the Commission for the Catholic University of Lublin, the Commission of Clergy and the Council of the Family.

=== Personal life and death ===
Szkodoń was a painter in his free time.

Szkodoń died in Kraków on 28 August 2025, at the age of 78.

Catholic Church titles
Preceded by —	Auxiliary Bishop of Kraków; 1988–2022	Succeeded by —
Preceded by Jan Pietraszko	Titular Bishop of Turrisblanda; 1988–2025	Succeeded by Vacant
