= Godziszka, Silesian Voivodeship =

Godziszka
- Village
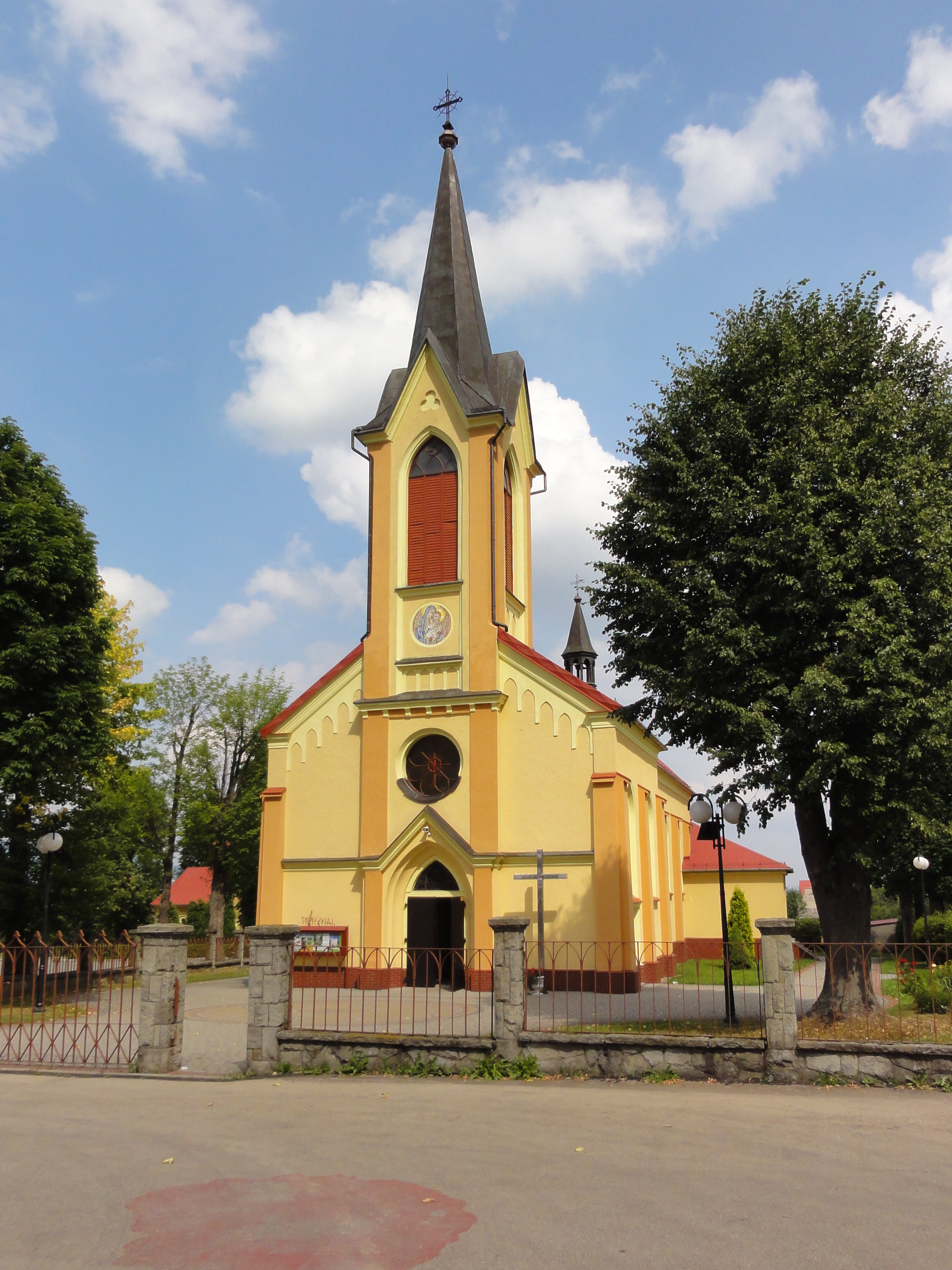
- Roman Catholic church

- Coat of arms

- Location within Poland
- Coordinates: 49°42′47″N 19°4′55″E
- Country: Poland
- Voivodeship: Silesian
- County: Bielsko
- Gmina: Buczkowice
- First mentioned: 1618
- Elevation: 420–580 m (1,380–1,900 ft)
- Population: 2,243

Godziszka [ɡɔˈd͡ʑiʂka] is a village in the administrative district of Gmina Buczkowice, within Bielsko County, Silesian Voivodeship, in southern Poland.

== See also ==
- Godziszka, Kuyavian-Pomeranian Voivodeship
- www.godziszka.info
