= Gmina Buczkowice =

Gmina Buczkowice Buczkowice Commune
- Gmina
- Coat of arms

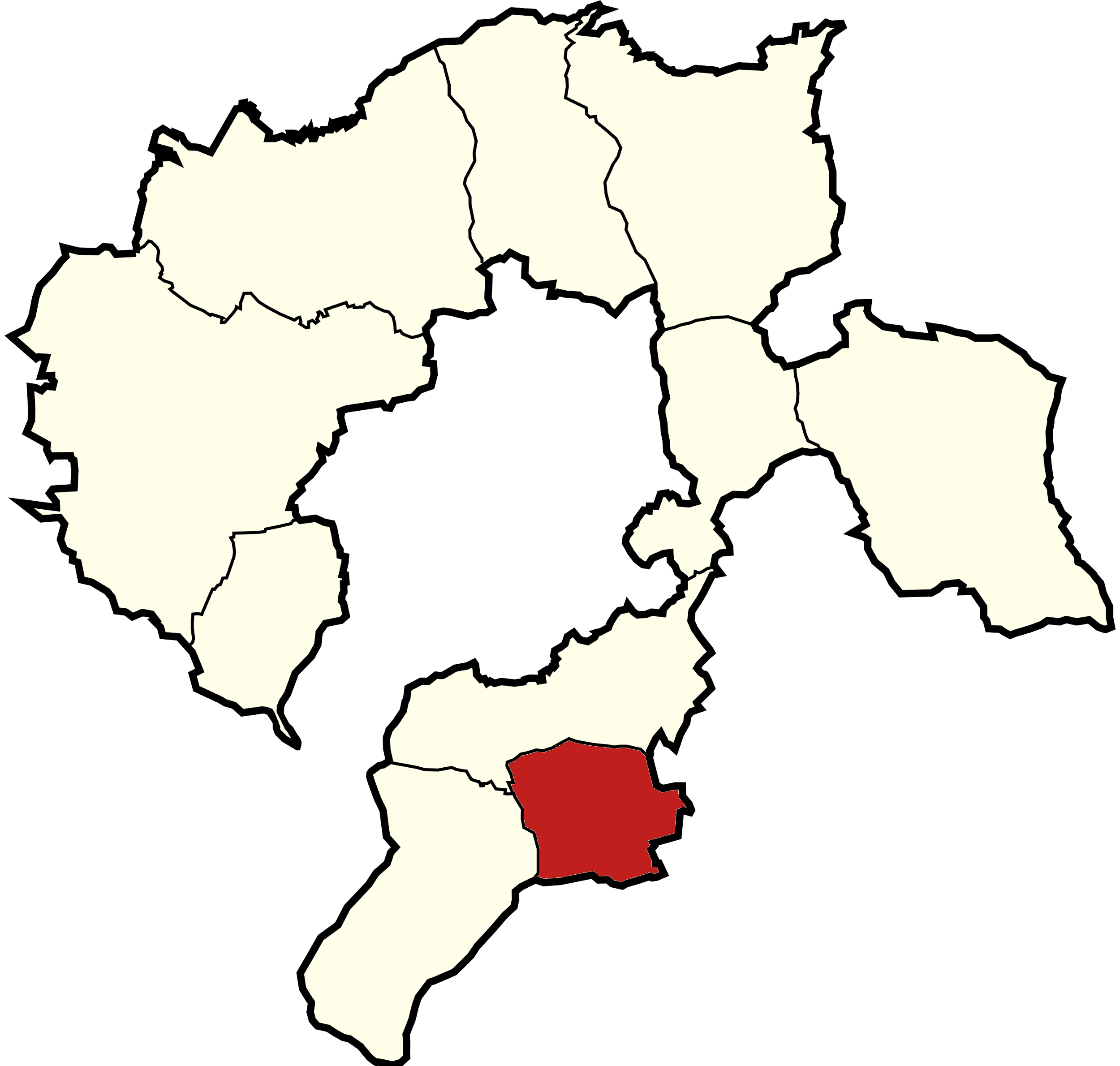
- Gmina Buczkowice within the Bielsko County
- Coordinates (Buczkowice): 49°43′41″N 19°4′10″E
- Country: Poland
- Voivodeship: Silesian
- County: Bielsko
- Seat: Buczkowice

Area
  - Total: 19.33 km^{2} (7.46 sq mi)

Population (2024-12-31)
  - Total: 10,824
  - Density: 560.0/km^{2} (1,450/sq mi)
- Website: https://buczkowice.pl/

Gmina Buczkowice is a rural gmina (administrative district) in Bielsko County, Silesian Voivodeship, in southern Poland. Its seat is the village of Buczkowice, which lies approximately 12 kilometres (7 mi) south of Bielsko-Biała and 59 km (37 mi) south of the regional capital Katowice.

The gmina covers an area of 19.33 square kilometres (7.5 sq mi), and as of 2019 its total population is 11,196.

== Villages ==
Gmina Buczkowice contains the villages and settlements of Buczkowice, Godziszka, Kalna and Rybarzowice.

== Neighbouring gminas ==
Gmina Buczkowice is bordered by the town of Szczyrk and by the gminas of Lipowa, Łodygowice and Wilkowice.

== Twin towns – sister cities ==
Gmina Buczkowice is twinned with:

- Dobrá, Czech Republic
