= Turrisblanda =

Former town in Tunisia

Roman Africa map

Turrisblanda, was a Roman and Byzantine era colonia (town) in the Roman Empire province of Byzacena in what is today modern Tunisia. Its exact location remains unknown. It was also a capital of an historic diocese of the Roman Empire. The bishopric remains today as a titular see of the Roman Catholic Church.

== Known bishops ==
There are three bishops attributed to this diocese.

- The Donatist Maximinus who attended the Carthage conference of 411, which brought together the Catholic and Donatist bishops of Roman Africa; on that occasion the town did not have the Catholic bishop.
- Paul who took part in the synod gathered in Carthage by the Huneric the Vandal king in 484, after which Paul was exiled.
- Datianus participated in the antimonothelite council of 641.

The Titular see was established 1933.

- Jan Pietraszko, Auxiliary Bishop of Cracow November 23, 1962 – March 2, 1988
- Jan Szkodoń, Auxiliary Bishop of Cracow May 14, 1988 – August 28, 2025
