= Rybarzowice, Silesian Voivodeship =

Rybarzowice
- Village
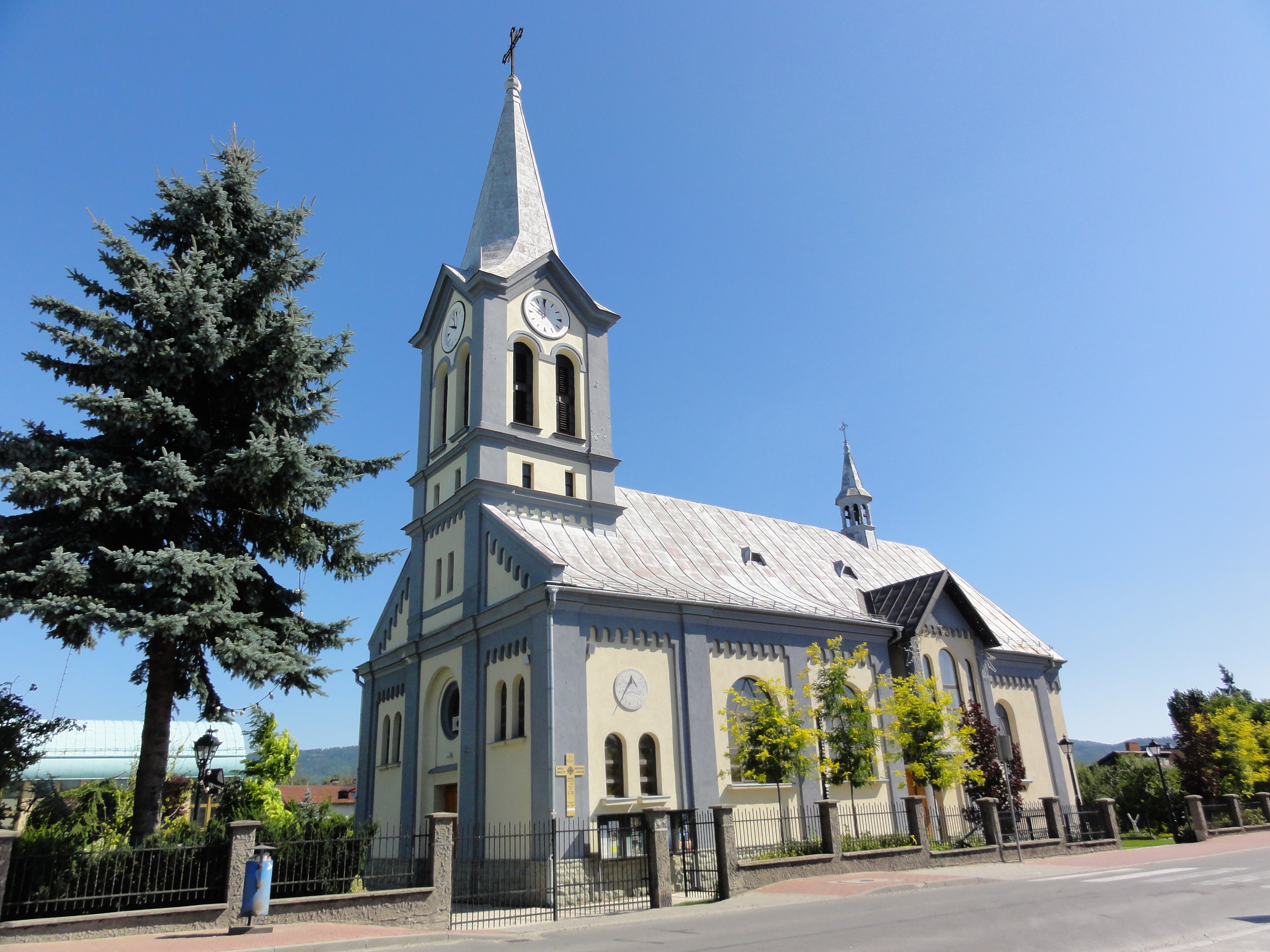
- Church of Our Lady of Consolation

- Coat of arms

- Location within Poland
- Coordinates: 49°43′45″N 19°6′16″E
- Country: Poland
- Voivodeship: Silesian
- County: Bielsko
- Gmina: Buczkowice
- First mentioned: 1581

Population
  - Total: 3,336

Rybarzowice [rɨbaʐɔˈvit͡sɛ] is a village in the administrative district of Gmina Buczkowice, within Bielsko County, Silesian Voivodeship, in southern Poland.

The village was first mentioned in a written document in 1581.

== History ==
The first mention of Ribarzowice comes from the conscript register of the Silesian poviat in 1581. In 1592, it was mentioned under the German name Fischendorf, which is related to the proximity of the Bielsko-Biała language island

In 1595, the village, located in the Silesian poviat of the Krakow voivodship, was owned by the castellan of Nowy Sącz,

After the partitions, Rybarzowice found itself under Austrian rule becoming a part of the Kingdom of Galicia and Lodomeria . From 1867 within the borders of the Biała County According to the Austrian census of 1900, 223 buildings in Rybarzowice, on an area of 885 hectares ( gemeinde and gutsgebiete ), were inhabited by 1,536 people (population density 173.6 people/km^{2}), of which 1,525 (99.3%) were Catholics and 11 (0 .7%) Jews, while 1,529 (99.5%) were Polish-speaking

=== World War II and 21st century ===
During World War II, the village was incorporated into the Bielitz district in the Third Reich under the name of Fischersdorf,

In 1975–1998, the town administratively belonged to the Bielsko Voivodeship.
