= Jan Pietraszko =

Polish Roman Catholic bishop

Venerable Jan Pietraszko
- Auxiliary Bishop of Kraków
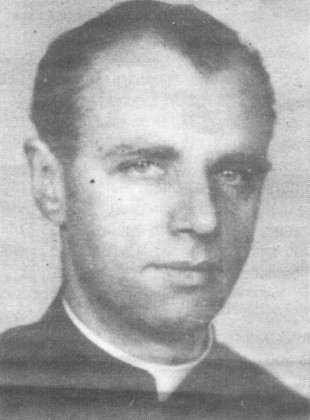
- Pietraszko circa 1946.
- Church: Roman Catholic Church
- Archdiocese: Kraków
- See: Kraków
- Appointed: 23 November 1962
- Term ended: 2 March 1988
- Other post: Titular Bishop of Turrisblanda (1962-88)

Orders
- Ordination: 5 April 1936 by Adam Stefan Sapieha
- Consecration: 15 April 1963 by Stefan Wyszyński

Personal details
- Born: Jan Pietraszko; 7 August 1911 Buczkowice, Galicia, Austria-Hungary
- Died: 2 March 1988 (aged 76) Kraków, Poland
- Education: Jagiellonian University
- Motto: Ex hominibus pro hominibus

Sainthood
- Venerated in: Roman Catholic Church
- Title as Saint: Venerable
- Attributes: Episcopal attire

Jan Pietraszko (7 August 1911 - 2 March 1988) was a Polish Roman Catholic bishop who served as one of the auxiliaries for the Kraków archdiocese and Titular Bishop of Turrisblanda from 1962 until his death. Pietraszko was a noted spiritual director and chaplain as well as a popular confessor but was best known for his sermons and for his homiletic writings. He did his ecclesial studies just before World War II broke out and was a brief hostage of the Gestapo after the Nazi forces invaded Poland in 1939. He later came under the watch of the communist secret service following the conflict for his attempt to see new churches constructed and church art and architecture preserved.

The process for his beatification opened in 1994 and he became titled as a Servant of God. The cause culminated on 21 December 2018 after Pope Francis confirmed his heroic virtue which enabled for Pietraszko to be titled as Venerable.

== Life ==
Jan Pietraszko was born on 7 August 1911 in Buczkowice as the eldest of three children to the poor farmers Józef Pietraszko and Anna Migdał (d. 11.5.1914); he received his baptism in the Transfiguration church on 13 August from Father Andrzej Lenart. His two brothers were Władysław and Józef. His mother died when he was three after which his father married his sister-in-law on 15 August 1916 with whom he had seven children thus leaving Pietraszko with five half-sisters and two half-brothers.

Pietraszko did his initial schooling in Buczkowice from 1917 until 1923 and then did high school in Bielsko-Biała; he graduated from high school in 1931 and following this commenced his ecclesial studies. He did his theological studies in the Jagiellonian and then received his sacerdotal ordination to the priesthood on 5 April 1936 (Palm Sunday) from the then-Archbishop Adam Stefan Sapieha in the Saint Francis church. From 1938 until 1939 and again from 1943 until 1944 he served as the aide and chaplain to Archbishop Sapieha. From 1936 until 1938 and again from 1939 until 1942 he served as a vicar in Rabka in the Saint Mary Magdalene parish. The Nazi forces invaded Poland therefore instigating World War II and for a brief time the Gestapo held him hostage. He served in the Trinity parish church from September 1942 until January 1943. From January 1944 until November 1946 he served as a vicar in Zakopane and then from 1947 until 1948 served in the Saint Stephen parish. Pietraszko from September 1948 until his death served in the Saint Anne church where from 18 February 1957 he would act as the "de facto" parish priest in the absence of a pastor. From 24 September 1947 until 1957 he served as the prefect for the seminarians of Kraków.

On 23 November 1962 he had learned that Pope John XXIII made him an auxiliary bishop for the Kraków archdiocese (an appointment that Bishop Karol Józef Wojtyla (future pope) had requested). He received his episcopal consecration on 15 April 1963 from Cardinal Stefan Wyszyński in the Wawel Cathedral; the principal co-consecrators were Bishops Karol Józef Wojtyła (with whom he became close friends) and Julian Jan Groblicki. Pietraszko - as a new bishop - was able to attend the last two sessions of the Second Vatican Council. He was enthusiastic about the Council and its reforms and supported the idea that he could celebrate the Mass in Polish for the benefit of the faithful. Upon being made a bishop he was made a vicar general for the diocesan priesthood (auxiliaries are granted an area or region to look after) on 4 July 1963 and from 12 March 1966 headed the archdiocesan commission for architecture and art which he took a special interest in. He fought for the creation of new churches despite the atheistic communist regime prohibiting this and it put him under the radar of the secret service who began their watch over him since around 1970. It was an exceptional case after being made a bishop that Pietraszko did not resign his position as a parish priest to accept his episcopal nomination since he wished to remain a simple pastor.

He spent a great deal of time in the confessional making him a sought-after confessor; he was also noted for his sermons which he took great time in preparing (after careful reading) thus making him a popular preacher. These sermons had a basis in important aspects of Sacred Scripture but would be rooted in a particular subject that came from certain scriptural texts. He was known as an outstanding preacher; tens of thousands of copies of transcripts of his sermons were published by samizdat.

He made it a practice where collections could not be taken during the traditional singing of Christmas carols in his church. He walked around often in a simple black clerical cassock as opposed to his episcopal attire. From 20 December 1968 he began his membership in the archdiocesan liturgical commission.

Pietraszko died in a neurological clinic on 2 March 1988. In an official telegram of condolence his friend Pope John Paul II hailed him for his "particular wisdom". His remains were interred on 7 March in the Saint Anne church under the altar of the Exaltation of the Cross.

== Beatification process ==
The beatification process for the late prelate opened in the Kraków archdiocese under Cardinal Franciszek Macharski in a diocesan process that launched on 18 March 1994 and closed on 24 April 2001; its task was to accumulate documentation (including his spiritual writings) and witness interrogatories. The formal launch to the cause came on 7 July 1994 after the Congregation for the Causes of Saints in Rome issued the "nihil obstat" (no objections) decree and titled Pietraszko as a Servant of God. The C.C.S. later validated this process on 22 February 2002 as having adhered to the congregation's regulations for conducting causes.

In 2012 the postulation (officials in charge of the cause) submitted the Positio dossier to the C.C.S. officials. This dossier was the culmination of all the evidence gathered during the diocesan phase; it detailed the late bishop's life and his reputation for holiness thus making the official argument for his becoming a saint. Theologians approved the dossier on 27 February 2018 as did the C.C.S. cardinal and bishops months after. Pietraszko became titled as Venerable on 21 December 2018 after Pope Francis confirmed that he had practiced heroic virtue during his lifetime.

The first postulator assigned to the cause was Stanisław Ryłko who had been a student of Pietraszko. The current postulator for this cause is Monsignor Właysław Gasidło.

== Writings ==
- Considerations (1961 and 1964)
- Meetings (1967)
- Meditations on the Way (1977 and 1983)
