= Godziszka, Kuyavian-Pomeranian Voivodeship =

Godziszka
- Village
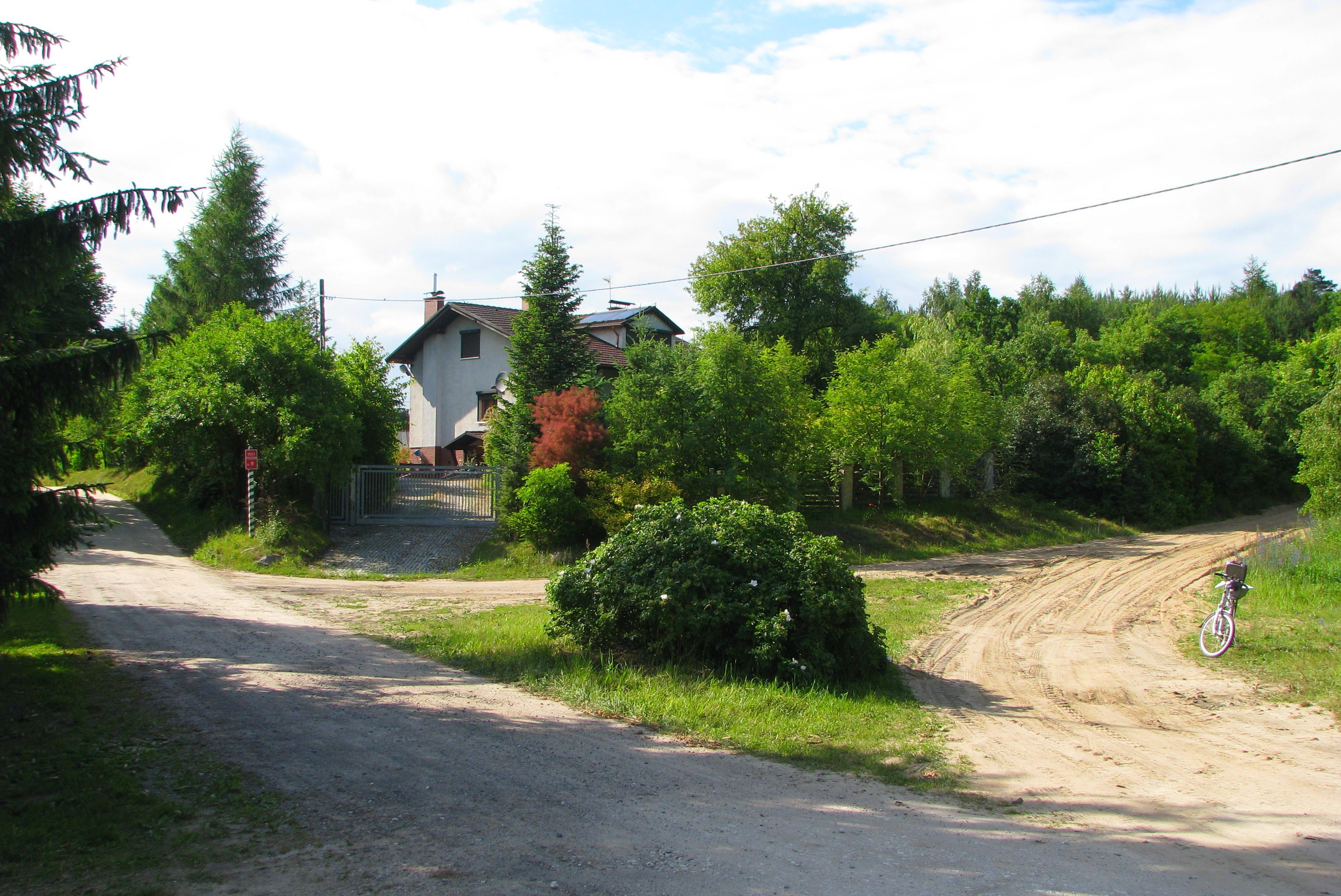

- Location within Poland
- Coordinates: 53°21′26″N 19°18′9″E
- Country: Poland
- Voivodeship: Kuyavian-Pomeranian
- County: Brodnica
- Gmina: Zbiczno
- Population: 30

Godziszka [ɡɔˈd͡ʑiʂka] is a village in the administrative district of Gmina Zbiczno, within Brodnica County, Kuyavian-Pomeranian Voivodeship, in north-central Poland.

== See also ==
- Godziszka, Silesian Voivodeship
