= Kalna Maharaja's High School =

Kalna Maharaja’s High School

Location
- Kalna, West Bengal, 713409; India; 23.2223104°N 88.3572479°E

Information
- Established: 1868
- Website: www.kalnarajschool.org.in

Kalna Maharaja's High School is one of the oldest school in erstwhile Burdwan district. It is situated at Kalna, Purba Bardhaman district in the Indian state of West Bengal. The School is affiliated to West Bengal Board of Secondary Education, West Bengal Council of Higher Secondary Education and recognised by School Education Department, West Bengal.

== History ==
At first, the school was established in Kalna beside the Ganga river by Pandit Tarakanta Bhattacharya with the consultation of Ishwar Chandra Vidyasagar and his friend educationist Taranath Bachaspati. In 1868 the school was officially started in the present premises by the help of Bardhaman Raj Mahtab Chand Bahadur.

== See also ==
- Education in India
- List of schools in India
- Education in West Bengal
