= Naba Kailash Mandir =

Group of Shiva temples in Kalna, West Bengal

- নব কৈলাশ মন্দির
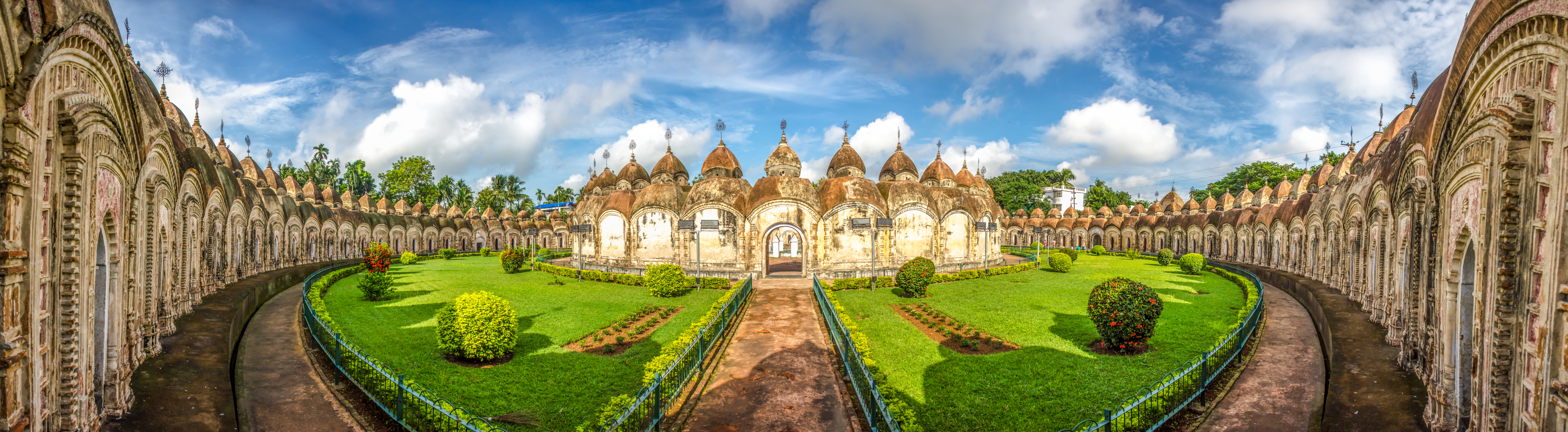
- Panoramic view of Naba Kailash Temple

Religion
- Affiliation: Hinduism
- District: Purba Bardhaman
- Deity: Shiva
- Festival: Maha Shivaratri

Location
- Location: Kalna City
- State: West Bengal
- Country: India
- Interactive map of Naba Kailash Mandir
- Coordinates: 23°13′13″N 88°21′53″E

Architecture
- Type: Bengal temple architecture
- Style: Chala Style
- Founder: Maharaja Teja Chandra Bahadur
- Established: 1809
- Completed: 1809; 217 years ago
- Temple: 108

Naba Kailash Mandir is a Shiva temple in Kalna City of Purba Bardhaman district, West Bengal, India. The temple structure, completed in 1809, consists of a combination of two concentric circles with a total of 108 small temples, each dedicated to Shiva. It represents the number of beads on a japamala, and the walls of this temple depict episodes from Mahabharata and Ramayana and many hunting scenes. There are seventy-four temples in the outer circle and thirty-four temples in the inner circle. Each of these 108 temples has a Shiva linga. Each Shiva linga in the inner circle, symbolizing Sadasiva, is white, while half of the Shiva linga in the outer circle, symbolizing Rudra, are black, and the other half are white.

== Structure ==
Naba Kailash Mandir
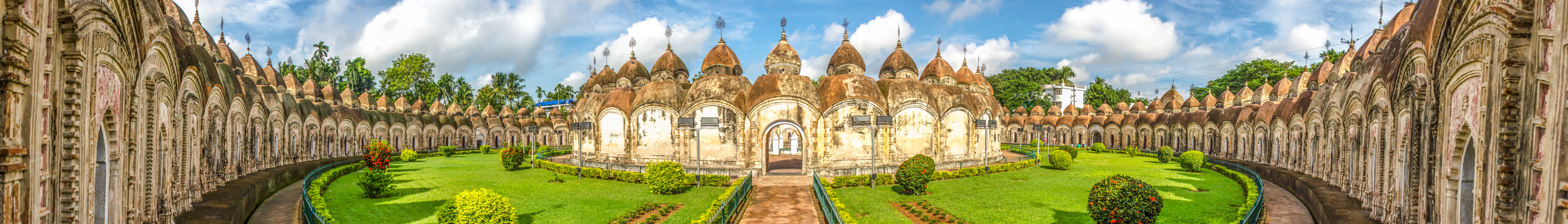
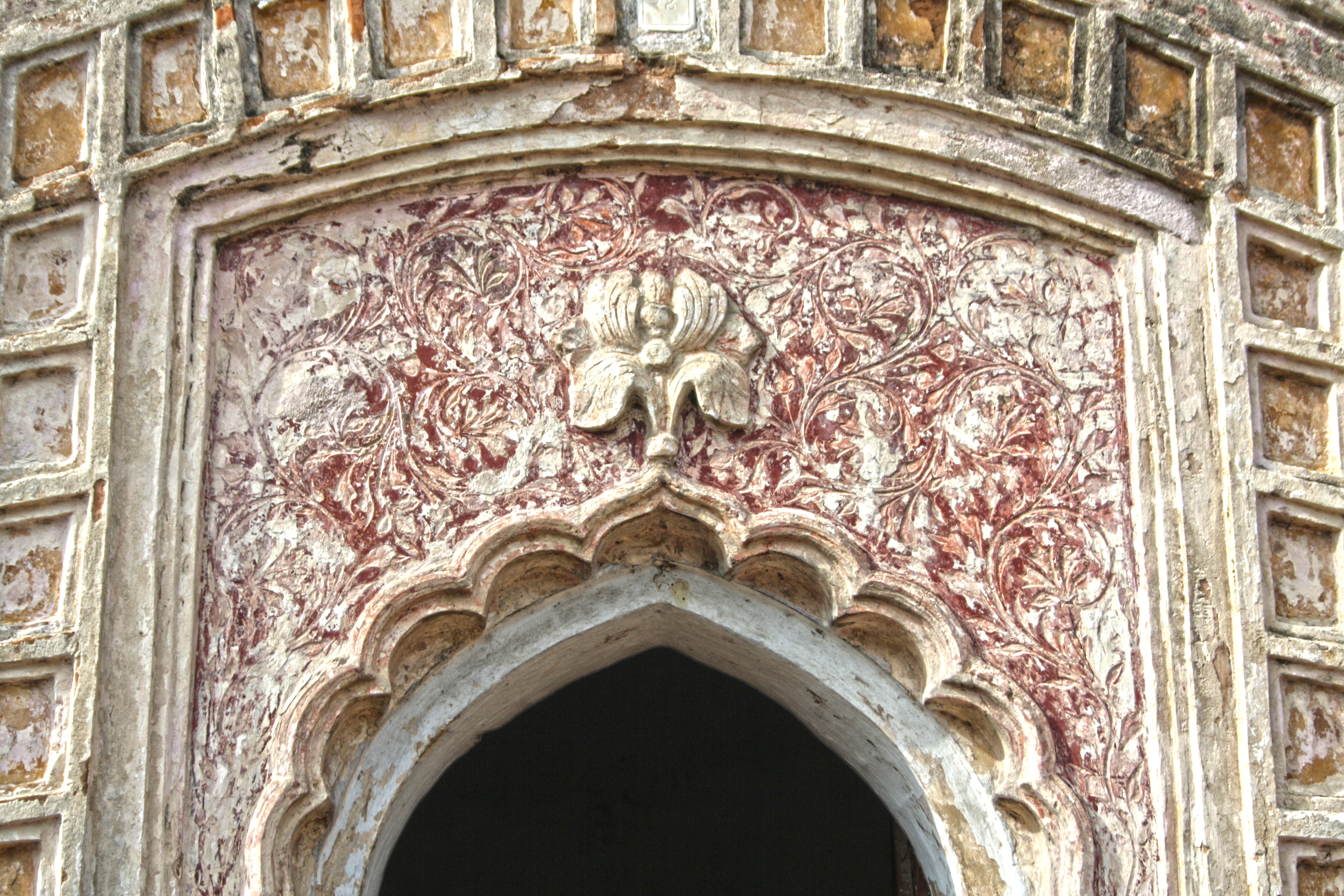
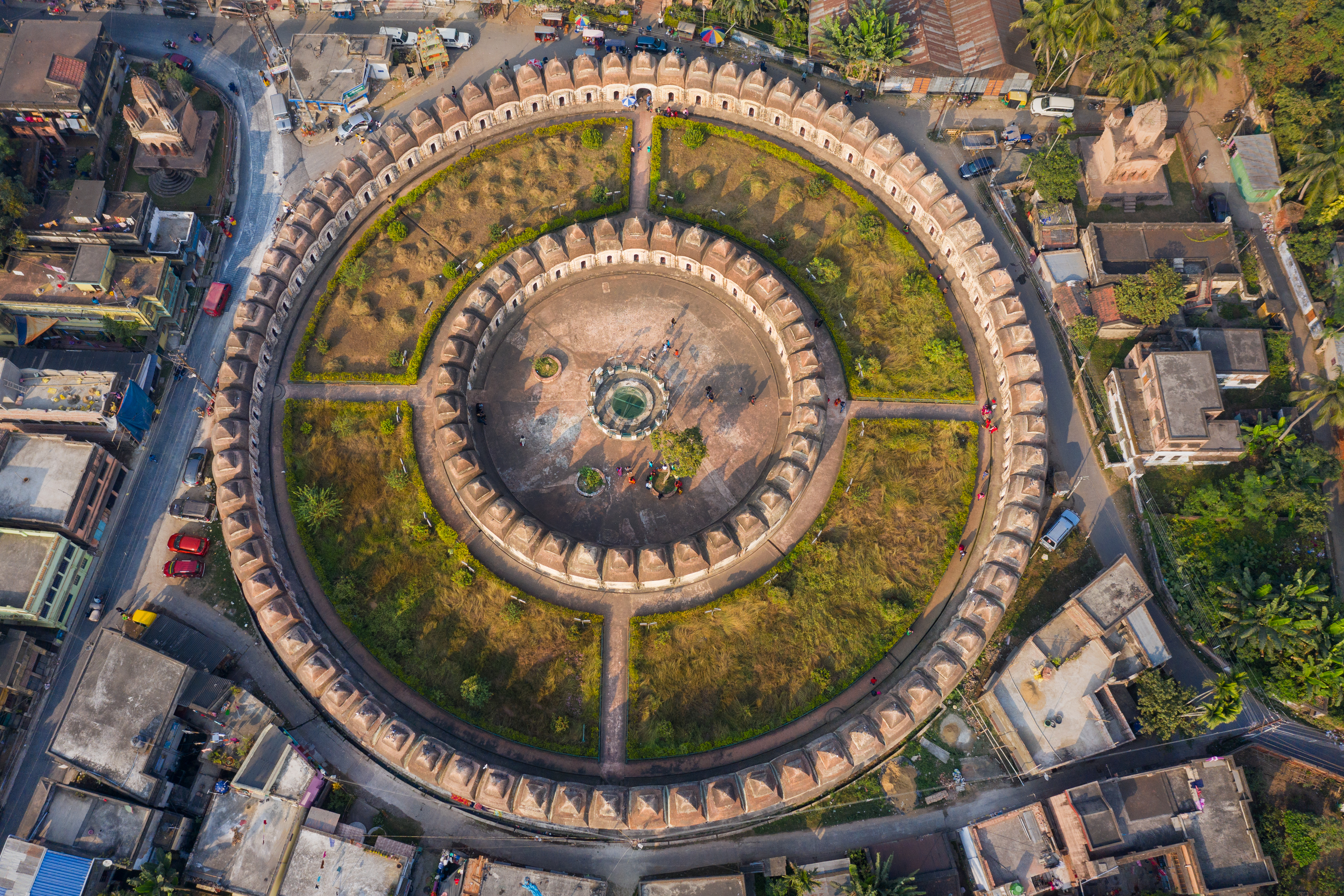
From top left to bottom right (a) Panoramic view of the Naba Kailash Temple (b) Floral Design in the temple (c) Aerial view of the temple

Naba Kailash Mandir has 108 Shiva temples arranged in two geometric circle. Among these temples arranged in two circles, 74 are located in the outer circle and a total of 34 in the inner circle, with an additional temple on the western side of the outer circle. All the 108 temples, forming two circles, are built in At-chala style of architecture. The inner circle has a circumference of about 336 feet (102 m) and the outer circle has a circumference of about 710 feet (220 m). These temples are built on low raised base-altars, and are adjacent to each other. The temples are about 20 feet (6.1 m) in height and 9.5 feet (2.9 m) in width. The temple on the western side of the outer circle is built in Pancha-ratna style, with an eight-stepped porch. The temple rests on a 6-foot-high (1.8 m) base-altar, and the height of the temple is 35 feet (11 m). The present name of this temple is Jaleswar Mandir. There is a feasible well in the center of both the circles, which meets the water needs of the temple for Puja.
