= Kalna, Crna Trava =

Kalna Кална (Serbian)
- Location within Serbia
- Coordinates: 42°52′11″N 22°26′52″E
- Country: Serbia
- District: Jablanica District
- Municipality: Crna Trava
- Time zone: UTC+1 (CET)
  - Summer (DST): UTC+2 (CEST)

Kalna (Serbian: Кална) is a small village in the Crna Trava municipality of the Jablanica District of Serbia.

== Geography and Info ==
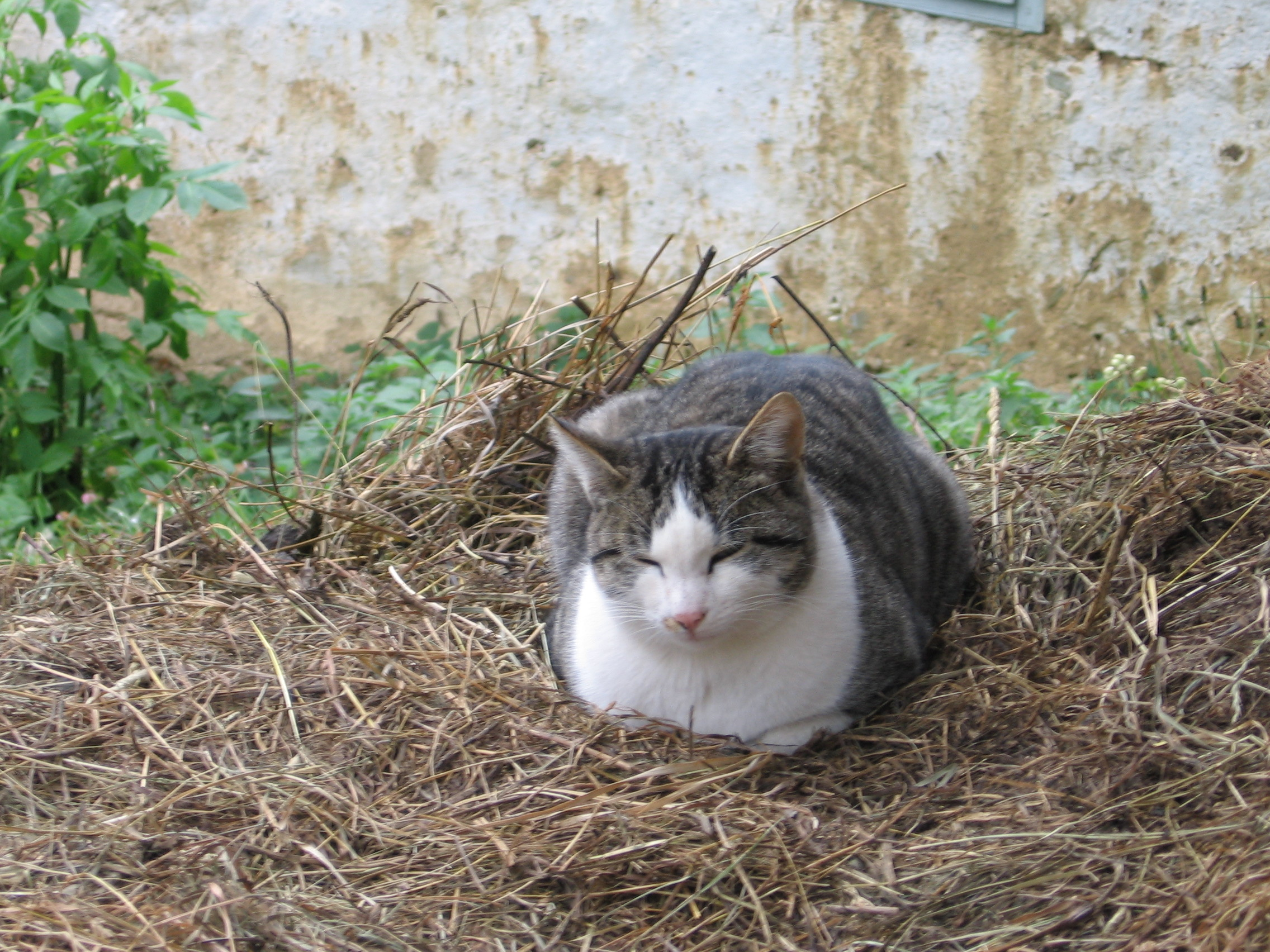

Kalna village is an old Serbian village, 35 km away from the Crna Trava. It is located between Tumba and Serbian-Bulgarian border, at an altitude of 500 to 1,100 m. The total area is rural area of 7,285 hectares.

The Kalna can be reached from three directions:

- from the northeast from Pirot, through Sukovo, Zvonce and Rakita,
- from the south, over the Surdulica, Vlasina or Strazimirovci and Preslap
- from the west, across from Leskovac, Vlasotince, Svođe, Tegošnica, Sastav reka and Gradska.

The road in this way was there since the Turkish rule. It was the shortest connection of Leskovac valley (Dubočica) to Sofia and Constantinople. It was used by Turkish caravans and merchants, later Serbian and Yugoslav army and the inhabitants of this region to link with the world.

The people have living tradition that Kalna named "kalu" - which is supposedly the mud which was here. This tradition is supported by the information in Kalna, especially in areas where the center of the village, has a white "Kali", which the women used to wash clothes and also because this name retained to this day.

According to another legend Kalna name comes from the Greek word "Kalos" which means good, and in the wider meaning of the word "Kalos" could be interpreted as a good country, good port, in terms of good natural shade or shelter. In support of this goes the fact that the Turkish Kalna censuses from the sixteenth century, was originally called Port Kalna (Kalna Luka).

Kalna belongs to the broken type of settlement. There are 38 parts (Mahalas), which are separated by several hundred meters to one, two, and up to five kilometers. Mahalas have from two to ten houses and they are mostly a continuation of ancestral communities. The first settlers came to Vlasina and settled near the present village Preslap.

The first traces of the existence of Kalna found in a Turkish official population censuses (Defter) from the sixteenth century. The village belonged to Leskovac districts. Residents had good status at Turkish in that time. Kalna came from Turkish slavery with 96 houses and 898 inhabitants, which suggests the possibility that after the outbreak of plague in the seventeenth century reconstruction of the village settlement, was generally from Vlasina, Crna Trava and partly from Znepolje. Settlement was completed in mid-eighteenth century.

The people who live in Kalna are exclusively Christian Serb population, which has its customs named Slava (in which celebrate certain Orthodox Saint) and as one of the essential elements for determining the ethnic affiliation (the most numerous St. Aranđel, St. John, St.. Nicholas and others).

The population is mainly engaged in agriculture, cattle breeding, and a little beekeeping. Agricultural crops grown are cereals - wheat, barley, rye, oats and potatoes, and cattle - sheep, goats and pigs.

Kalna people have studied pečalbarstvo (something like working in other areas far from home, mostly construction jobs) as a particular form of business. Kalna’s pečalbars have dealt exclusively Dunđer (builder) craft. The Kalna has the other professions too - craftsmen (blacksmith, tinsmith, carpenters, pinter, lime pit) traders and innkeeper.

Women were made garments of wool and cotton yarn (clothing, socks, all kinds of lace, skilfully woven, patchwork, etc.). However, the various craftworks time was slowly disappearing as the final was not shut down.

The earlier time it has been made handly complete men's and women's dress and of their own raw materials (wool, goat hair, leather, hemp). Men made home accessories, and furniture of wood (beds, chairs, benches, coat stands, etc.).

Men's dress during the Turkish rules was differed from the costumes after the liberation from them. Men wore Beletina (white cloth) inexpressibles and white wool socks. They wore black furry caps and shoes made from pork or beef leather.

Women's costume is the same as in the whole area. They wore a dress richly decorated with various motifs. Below dress wore the shirt with luxurious knitted lace. The head was decorated by a silk scarves.

House of Kalna people consisted of several rooms. One of the most important is the "house" (kitchen) with a plenty of wooden furniture, chair, tables, wooden spoons, barrels, pottery ... Rooms were lightened with lanterns. Wood beds were covered with specially made covers, beautifully decorated with various floral and geometrical ornaments. The walls were full of family photographs framed hand-made frames, and various pieces of woven textiles.

Through all the past residents of Kalna created many material and spiritual goods that enabled them to survive and preserve their national identity. They were expressed in the wealth of folk handicrafts, the costumes, the song and the game and numerous folk customs. Many of them originate from ancient times and face the landscapes from which residents are Kalna came and the time in which they lived. With economic development and strengthening of the village grew and the awareness of better and more beautiful life and some of these ethnographic values enriched with new content.
