= Kalna, Poland =

Kalna
- Village
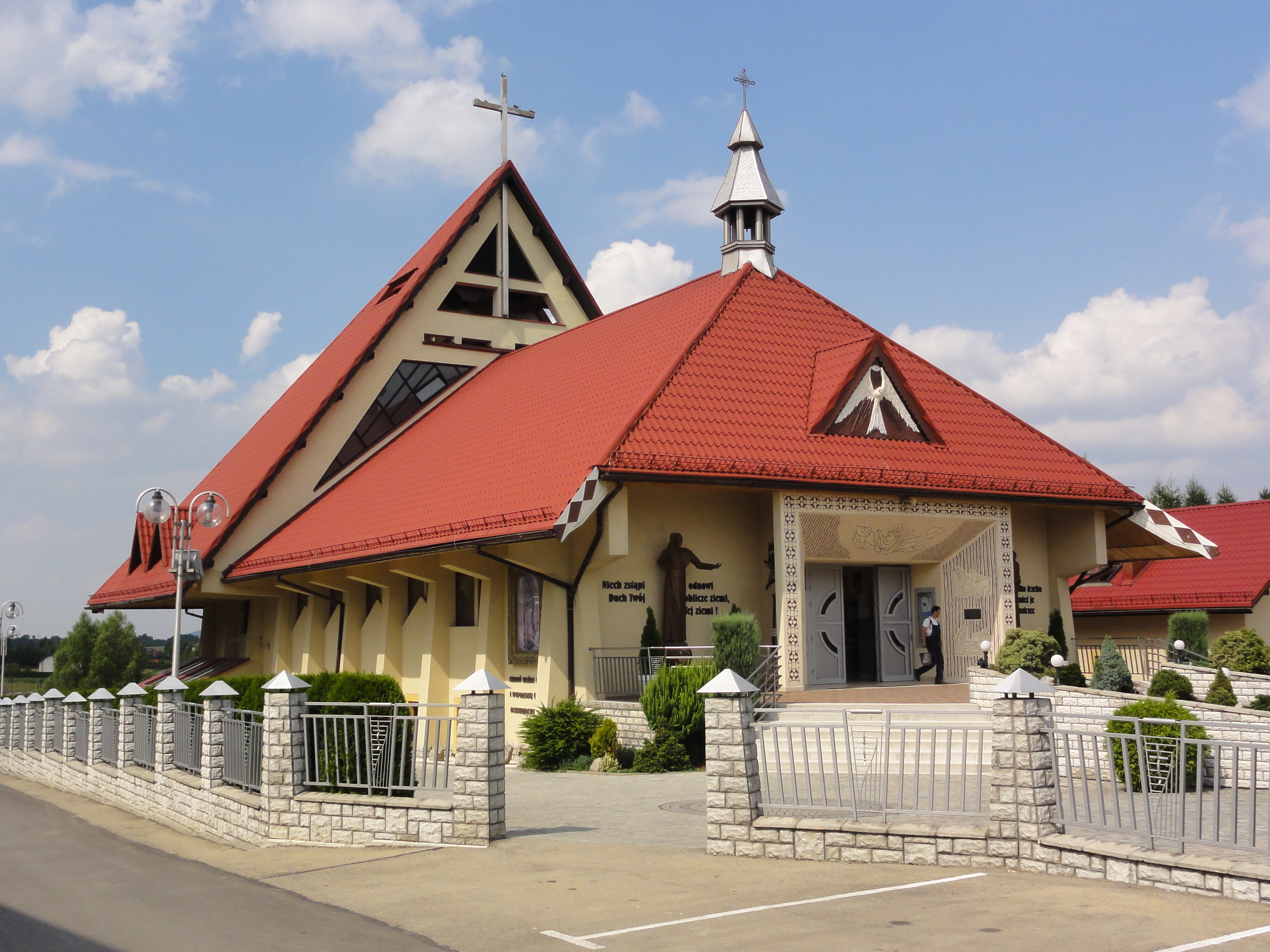
- Saint Anthony Church

- Coat of arms

- Location within Poland
- Coordinates: 49°42′34″N 19°6′32″E
- Country: Poland
- Voivodeship: Silesian
- County: Bielsko
- Gmina: Buczkowice
- Population: 977

Kalna ([ˈkalna] KAL-na) is a village in the administrative district of Gmina Buczkowice, within Bielsko County, Silesian Voivodeship, in southern Poland.
