= Buczkowice =

- Village
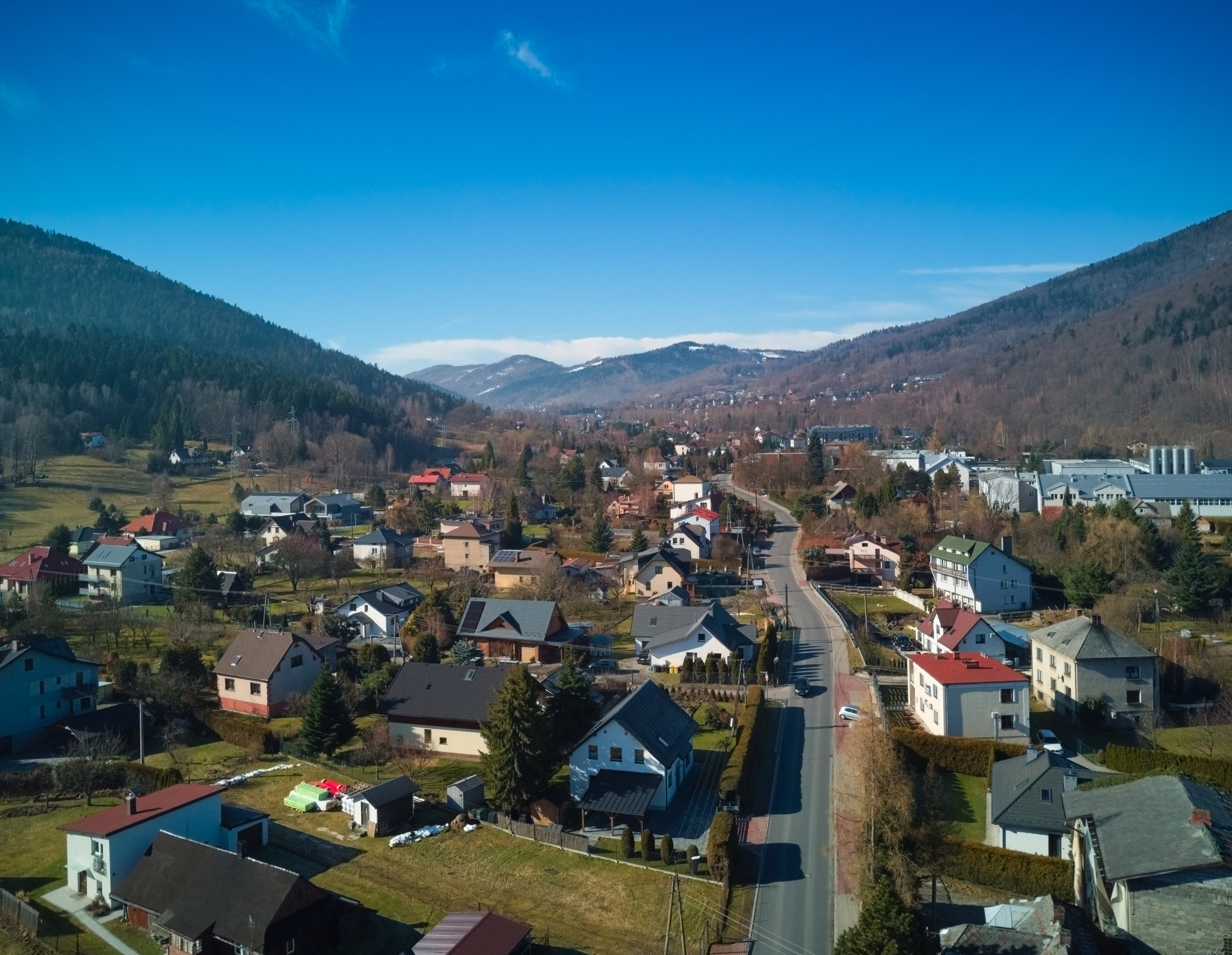
- Grunwaldzka Street, aerial view

- Coat of arms

- Location within Poland
- Coordinates: 49°43′41″N 19°4′10″E
- Country: Poland
- Voivodeship: Silesian
- County: Bielsko
- Gmina: Buczkowice
- Population: 4,268

Buczkowice [but͡ʂkɔˈvit͡sɛ] is a village in Bielsko County, Silesian Voivodeship, in southern Poland. It is the seat of the gmina (administrative district) called Gmina Buczkowice.
