= Kalna, India =

Town in West Bengal, India

Kalna Ambika Kalna
- Town
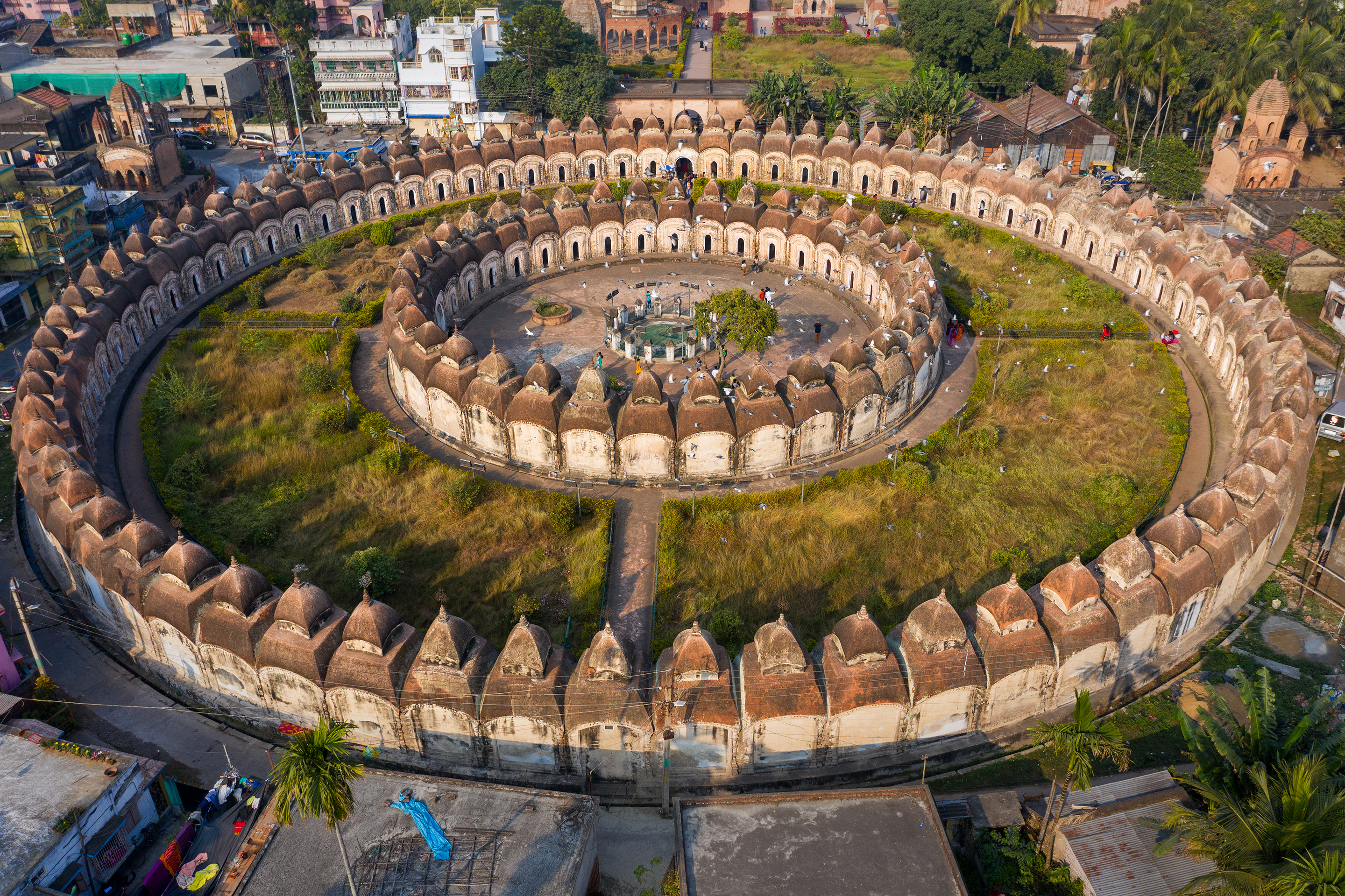
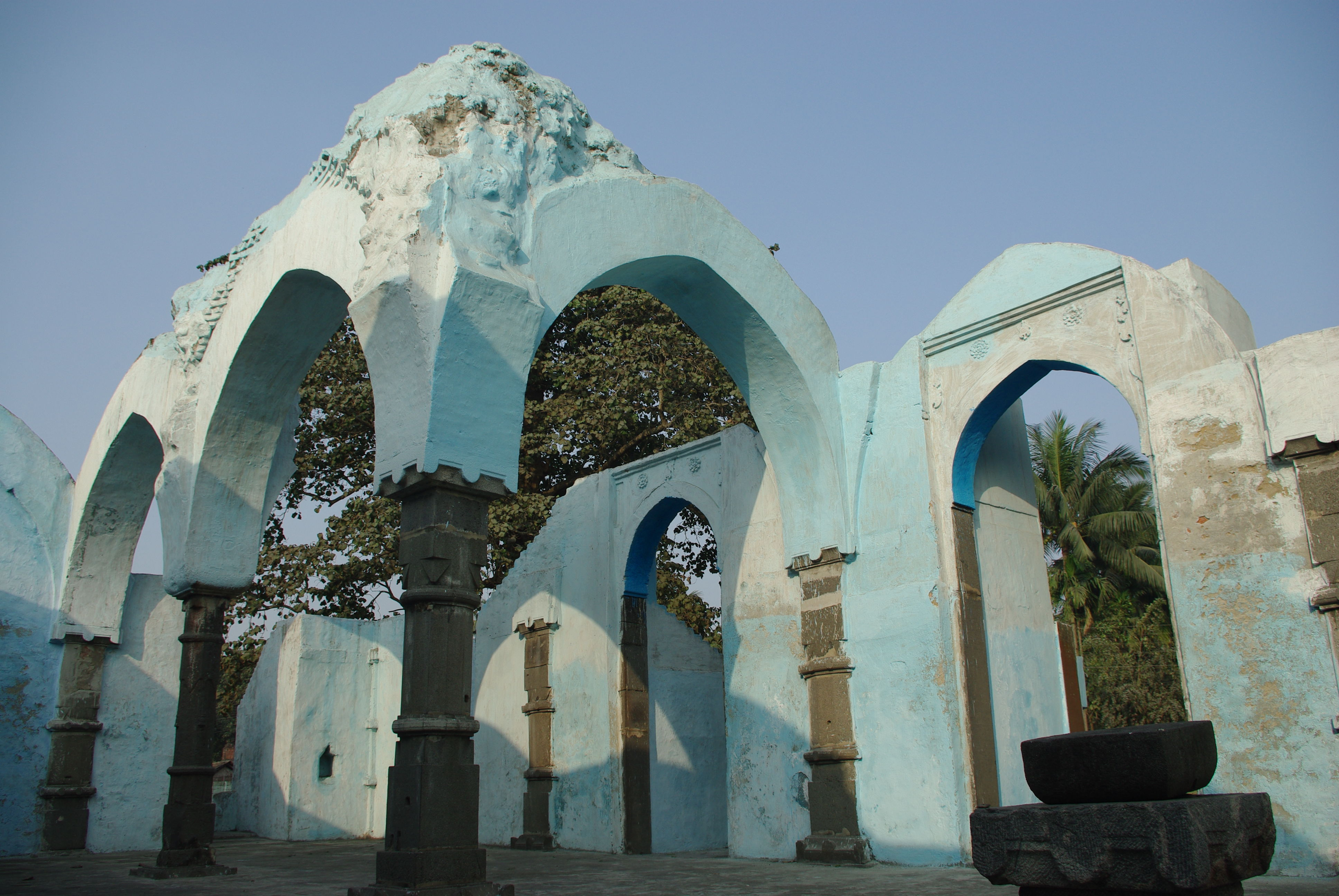
- Naba Kailash Mandir Pratapeswar Temple Lalji Temple Krishna Chandraji Mandir Id-Baqrid Mosque Ambika Kalna station
- Nickname: The Temple City
- Location in West Bengal, India Kalna (India)
- Coordinates: 23°13′2″N 88°21′8″E
- Country: India
- State: West Bengal
- District: Purba Bardhaman

Government
  - Type: Municipality
  - Body: Kalna Municipality
  - MLA: Siddhartha Majumder
  - Kalna Municipality Chairman Vice: Chairman Rina Banerjee(7/11/25 to till now) Vice Chairman Tapan Poral

Area
  - Total: 6.40 km^{2} (2.47 sq mi)
- Elevation: 11 m (36 ft)

Population (2011)
  - Total: 56,722
  - Density: 8,221/km^{2} (21,290/sq mi)

Languages
  - Official: Bengali, English
- Time zone: UTC+5:30 (IST)
- PIN: 713409
- Telephone code: +91-3454
- ISO 3166 code: IN-WB
- Sex ratio: 961 ♀/1000♂
- Literacy: 84.4%
- Lok Sabha constituency: Bardhaman Purba
- Vidhan Sabha constituency: Kalna
- Website: ebarkalna.weebly.com purbabardhaman.gov.in

Kalna or Ambika Kalna is a town in the Purba Bardhaman district of West Bengal, India. It is the headquarter of the Kalna subdivision, situated on the western bank of the Bhāgirathi river. The town is more popularly known as Ambika Kalna, named after the goddess Kali, Maa Ambika. It has numerous historical monuments, such as the Rajbari (the palace), and Naba Kailash Mandir or the 108 Shiva Temple. The city of Kalna is 60 kilometres (37 mi) from Bardhaman.

== History ==
The first reference to Ambika Kalna is found in a 6th-century text known as the Kubjika Tantra.

According to General Alexander Cunningham, the founder of the Archaeological Survey of India, Ambika Kalna was a frontier city of the Tamralipta kingdom during the 7th century. At that time, a naval base was founded in the city during the reign of Shashanka. Kalna houses the only Gaudiya Vaishnavist temple built in the lifetime of Chaitanya Mahaprabhu and the city was also an abode of pilgrimage for the Barnabites. On the first day of Ramadan on 939 AH (27 March 1533), a congregational mosque was built in Kalna by Ulugh Masnad Khan, who was the governor, commander and minister of Alauddin Firuz Shah II, the former Sultan of Bengal.

The city reached its apex during the late 18th century under the patronage of the Maharajas of Bardhaman, who built several temples with intricate terracotta ornamentation.

== Geography ==
Cities and towns in the Kalna subdivision of Purba Bardhaman district
M: municipal city/ town, CT: census town, R: rural/ urban centre. H: historical/ religious place.
Owing to space constraints in the small map, the actual locations in a larger map may vary slightly

=== Location ===
Kalna is located at 23.2175°N 88.3525°E. It has an average elevation of 11 meters (36 ft). It is located on the west bank of the Bhagirathi, a distributary of the Ganges, Ambika Kalna, or popularly known as Kalna, a sup-divisional town. It is a small reflection of a larger multi-dimensional background in Indian history.

The town can be accessed by rail, road, or river. By rail, it is connected on the loop line route from Howrah towards Katwa. Ambika Kalna, 81 km from Howrah, is the main railway station. There are several local trains, as well as express trains on the route and almost all of them stop at the Ambika Kalna rail station. By road, the town can be accessed from Krishnanagar, Katwa, Bandel, Pandua, Boinchi, Memari and Barddhaman.

Though part of the Purba Barddhaman District of West Bengal, it is located near the border with Nadia and Hooghly district, and is close to Nabadwip and Mayapur, known for the ISKCON center. Kalna is located beside Bhagirathi river.

Temperatures in this region vary from 17 to 18 °C in winter to 30–32 °C in summer.

== Demographics ==
According to the 2011 Census of India, Kalna had a total population of 56,722, of which 28,793 (51%) were males and 27,929 (49%) were females. The population below age six was 4,557. The total number of literate people in Kalna was 45,403 (80.04% of the population being over six years of age).

According to the 2001 Census of India, Kalna had a population of 52,176, of which 51% were male, and 49% female. Kalna had an average literacy rate of 84.4%, higher than the national average of 59.5%: male literacy is 90.1%, and female literacy is 78.4%. In Kalna, 9% of the population is under 6 years of age.

The steady flow of refugees from East Pakistan swelled the population of the area in the 1950s.

=== Religion ===
Hinduism is the main religion in Kalna with 94.75% of its citizens being Hindu. Islam is the second most practiced religion, with a following of approximately 4.88%. In Kalna, most of the Muslim population is situated in Jabari para and Balir Bazar ,0.12% practice Christianity, 0.01% practice Jainism, 0.02% practice Sikhism and 0.07% practice Buddhism. Formally, they come from Chittagong Bangladesh. Around 0.15% of the population does not practice any particular religion.

Religion in Kalna (2011)
1. Hinduism (94.8%)
2. Islam (4.88%)
3. Christianity (0.12%)
4. Sikhism (0.02%)
5. Buddhism (0.07%)
6. Jainism (0.01%)
7. not stated (0.15%)

== Attractions ==
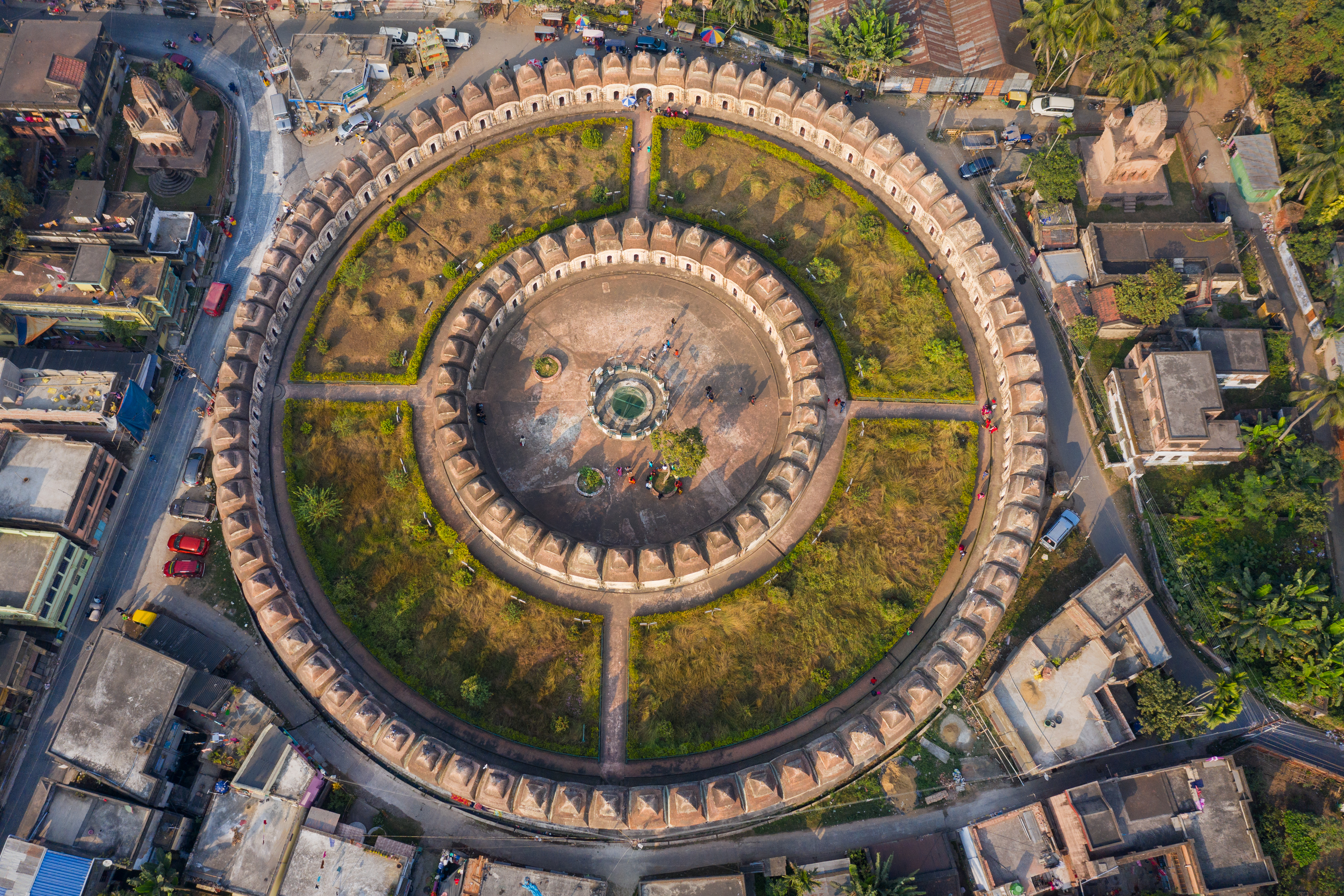
Drone shot of 108 Shiva temples arranged in two concentric circles, built in 1809

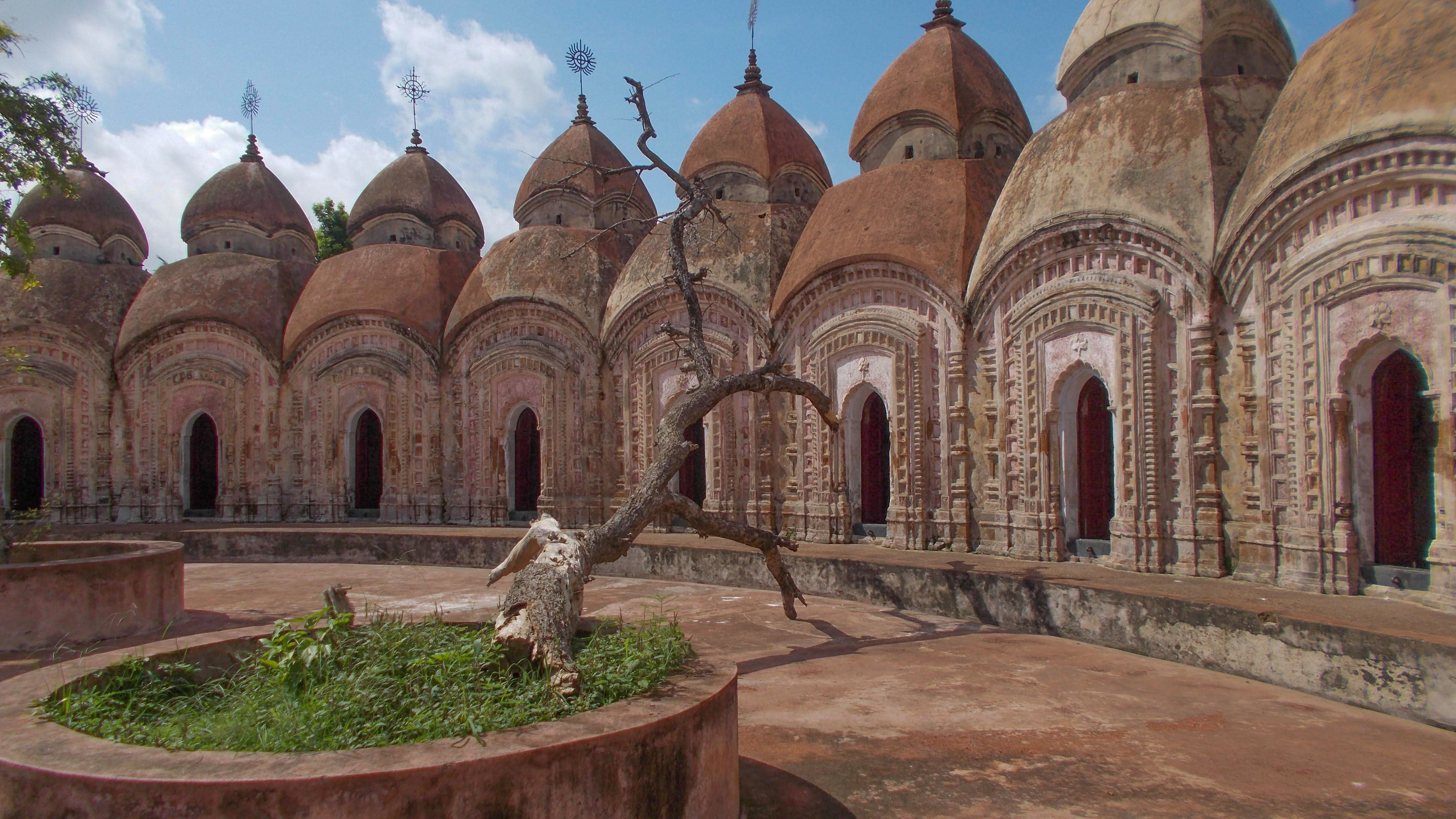
108 Shiv Mandir, Kalna

Popularized by the sage Bhaba Pagla, the temple of Debi Bhabani holds a special puja on the last Saturday of the Bengali month of Baisakh. Close to it is Sri Gauranga Mandir. The temple complex houses Sri Chaitanya's manuscripts and personal belongings. A major landmark is the Siddheshwari Temple. It is dedicated to Debi Ambika, and it is after her that Kalna is also known as Ambika Kalna. The temple is nearly 800 years old.

A major attraction is the Nava Kailash or 108 Shiv Mandirs. Built-in 1809, the temples were constructed in two circles. One consists of 74 temples, whilst the other has 34. The former has white marble and black stone shiva lingas, whilst the latter comprises white marble shivling. Due to its ingenious planning, all of the shiva lingas can be seen from the center of the temple complex.

The Krishna Chandra Mandir (1751–1752), with its 25 steeples, depicts several scenes from the epics upon its terracotta walls. Doors remain closed from 1 p.m. until 4 p.m. Also worthy of note are Lalji Mandir (1739) with 25 steeples, and Pratapeshvara Mandir (1849) of the Rekha style; this temple has magnificent terracotta designs.

Maijir Bari was established in 1752 and has the Shyamchand Radharani Mondir. It has preserved a tradition of nearly 300 years and, even today, festivals such as Dol Purnima, Rath yatra, Jhulan Purnima, Annakot, and Rash are celebrated every year involving the people of the region, irrespective of caste, creed, or religion.

Projapoti Bari is also quite well known. This landmark house has a huge butterfly emblem atop. Hemanta Banerjee, who inherited the house from his father, also owned Sur-O-Sathi. Apurba Banerjee, brother of Hemanta Banerjee, started Kali puja in 1947.

Gopalbari Mandir consisting of 25 steeples signifies a perfect sculpture. On the walls of these Temples, many Terracotta warriors are ornamented. There is an image of copulation engraved here. A hall adjacent to the Temple for devotional dancing and musical performances was erected. It is an indication of traditional sculpture, located in Bhaduri Para.

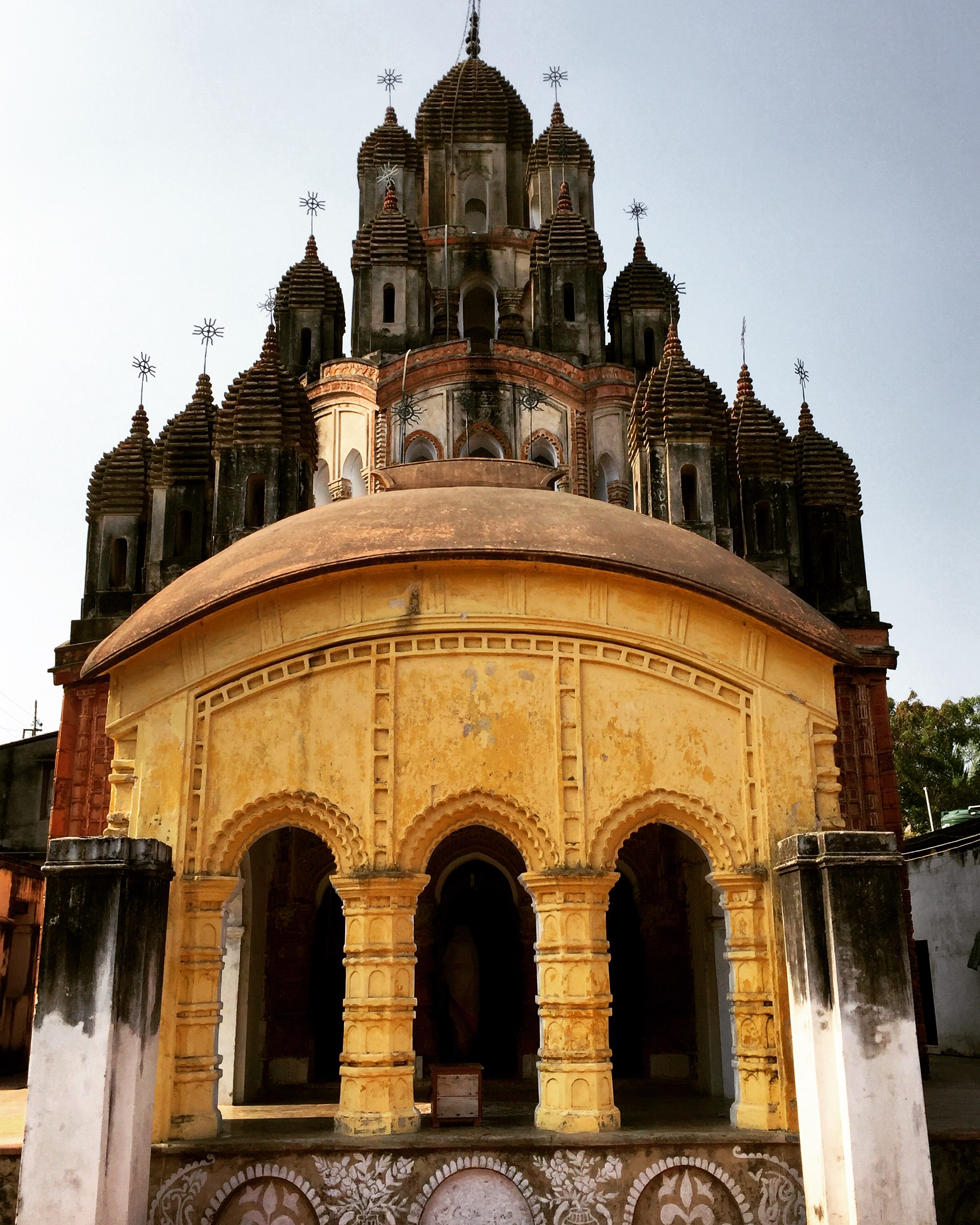
Gopalbari Temple

In 688, Siddheswari Kali Mandir was established by Rishi-Amburish. The first time the Goddess was worshipped through the ritual of earthen-pot (ghatt). The ghatt sticks to a stone winnowing tray. This auspicious image is made of a single Neem log. This image represents Bamakali Idol. The responsibility of this Goddess was shouldered on the part of -1. Sri Taraprassana Adhikari, 2. Kaliprassana Adhikari and now, the 7th generation personality Sri Sonatan Adhikari and Gopal Adhikari are the priests of this Temple. Long ago scarifies of humans to the altar of the Temple were in vogue. But at present he-goat, sugarcane, gourd, etc. instead of a human. The Goddess is worshipped during the new moon in the month of Kartik.

Ananta Basudev Mandir is situated at Shyamrai Para. The temple is about 250 years old. His Honour, Maharaj Bahktipromode Puri Goswami had renovated this Temple about 60 years back. Now, Maharaj's nephews, nieces, and their husbands have got the responsibility of looking after it. About 250 years back, his Highness Maharaj of Burdwan founded this Temple.

Buddha Mandir is situated at Bara-Mitra-Para it is the oldest Buddhist temple in ‘Purba Burdwan District’ about 37 years old, a small Theravada Buddhist community (Barua) looking after it. in the temple shrine, a six feet tall gold-plated metallic Buddha statue from Thailand and an old marble Buddha statue originating from Burma are the two main attractions.

There is also the famous Tamarind tree, more than 500 years old, below which Sri Chaitanya came and met Nityananda.

In the past, Pathuria Mahal Ghat was used for Ferry-ghat. Now it has got its identity as an auspicious bathing-ghat in the name of Late Naresh Chandra Kumar, an extraordinary personality and donor of the Bathing-Ghat. It is located at Pathuriyamahal, Kalna.

Recently, Kalna Porjoton Utsab is being organized on every winter (2nd Week of January). Since 2014, the entire Rajbari Temple Complex has been illuminated. Ras Manch is the main attraction there in the evening.

== Education ==
Kalna College, one of the oldest colleges under the University of Burdwan, was founded in 1943. It is accredited B++ by the NAAC. Kalna Polytechnic was established in 2000. Besides, there are several Higher secondary and secondary schools. Some reputed schools & educational institutions in Kalna are:

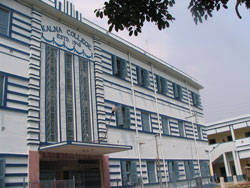
Kalna College

- Kalna General College
- Kalna Maharaja's High School
- Kalna Polytechnic
- Acme Academy
- Ambika Mahishmardini High School
- Gajalaxmi High School
- Hindu Girls' High School
- Kalna Primary Teacher's Training Institute
- Mahishmardini Boys' Institution
- Mahishmardini Girls' Institution
- Mayasundari High School
- Nigamananda High School
- Sasibala Saha High School

== Transport ==
Being situated at the junction of three districts (Purba Bardhaman, Hooghly, and Nadia), Kalna has a well-developed transportation network. The main mode of local transport is cycle rickshaw, auto-rickshaw and Electric rickshaw. A project was launched for River bridge between Kalna and Shantipur.

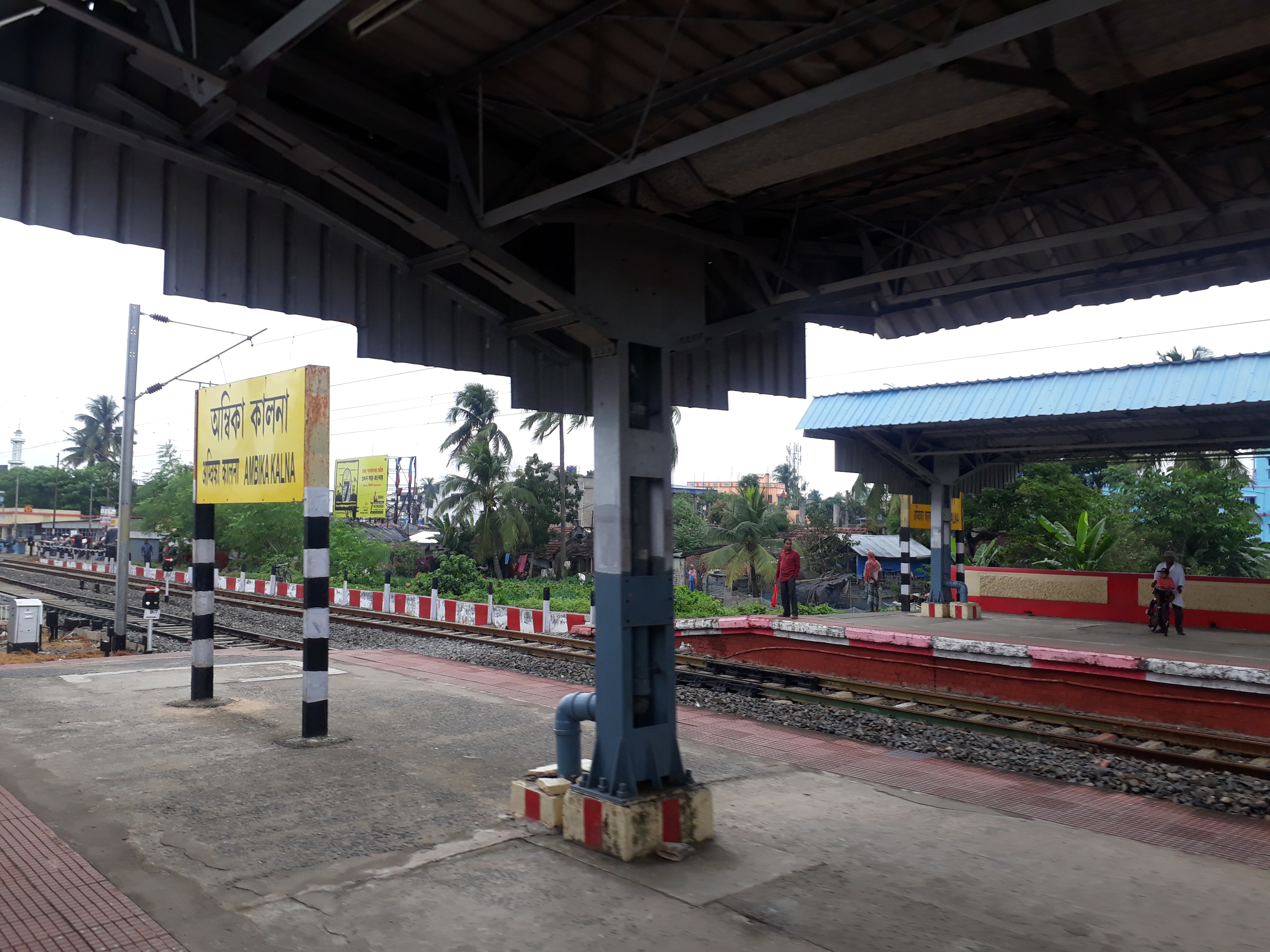
Ambika Kalna railway station

=== Rail ===
Though the main railway station of the town is Ambika Kalna, the northern part of the city can also be accessed through Baghnapara. Ambika Kalna is 42 km and Baghnapara is 46 km from Bandel on the Bandel–Katwa line. There are many local trains (EMU) and a few express and passenger trains from Howrah and Sealdah.

=== Road ===
Kalna is linked to important cities of South Bengal by road. The main bus stand is situated beside the STKK Road (SH 6). There is a Government bus depot operated by South Bengal State Transport Corporation (SBSTC) which services Long-distance express buses, connecting various cities (Asansol, Durgapur, Bardhaman, Bankura, Dumka, Digha, Malda, Bishnupur, Balurghat, etc.) of West Bengal and Jharkhand. Bus services are available for other sistricts in West Bengal.

== Gallery ==
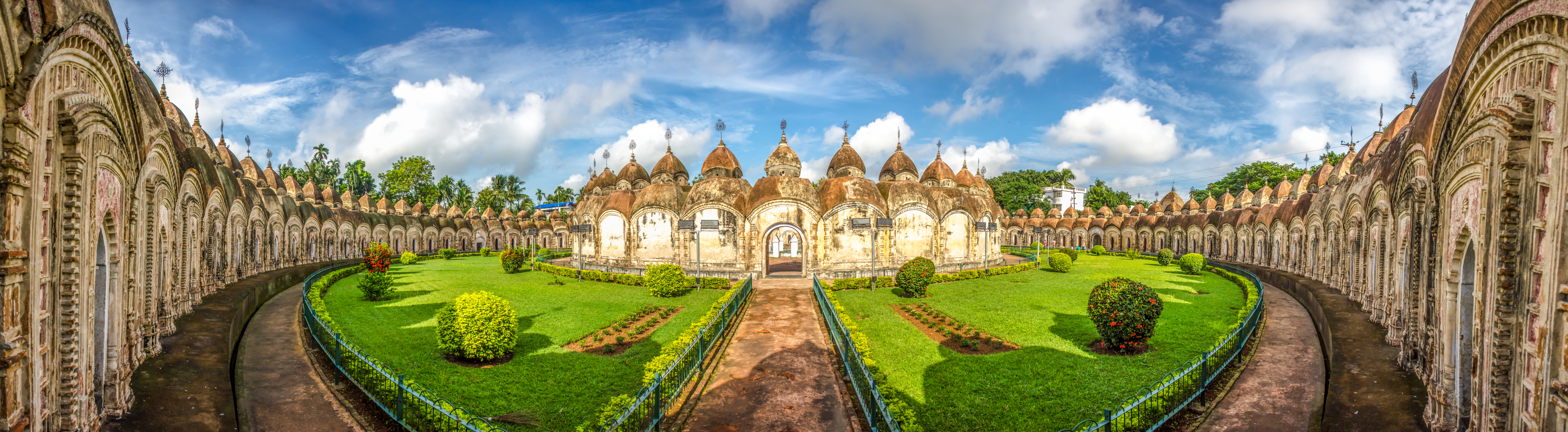
Nava Kailash Temple

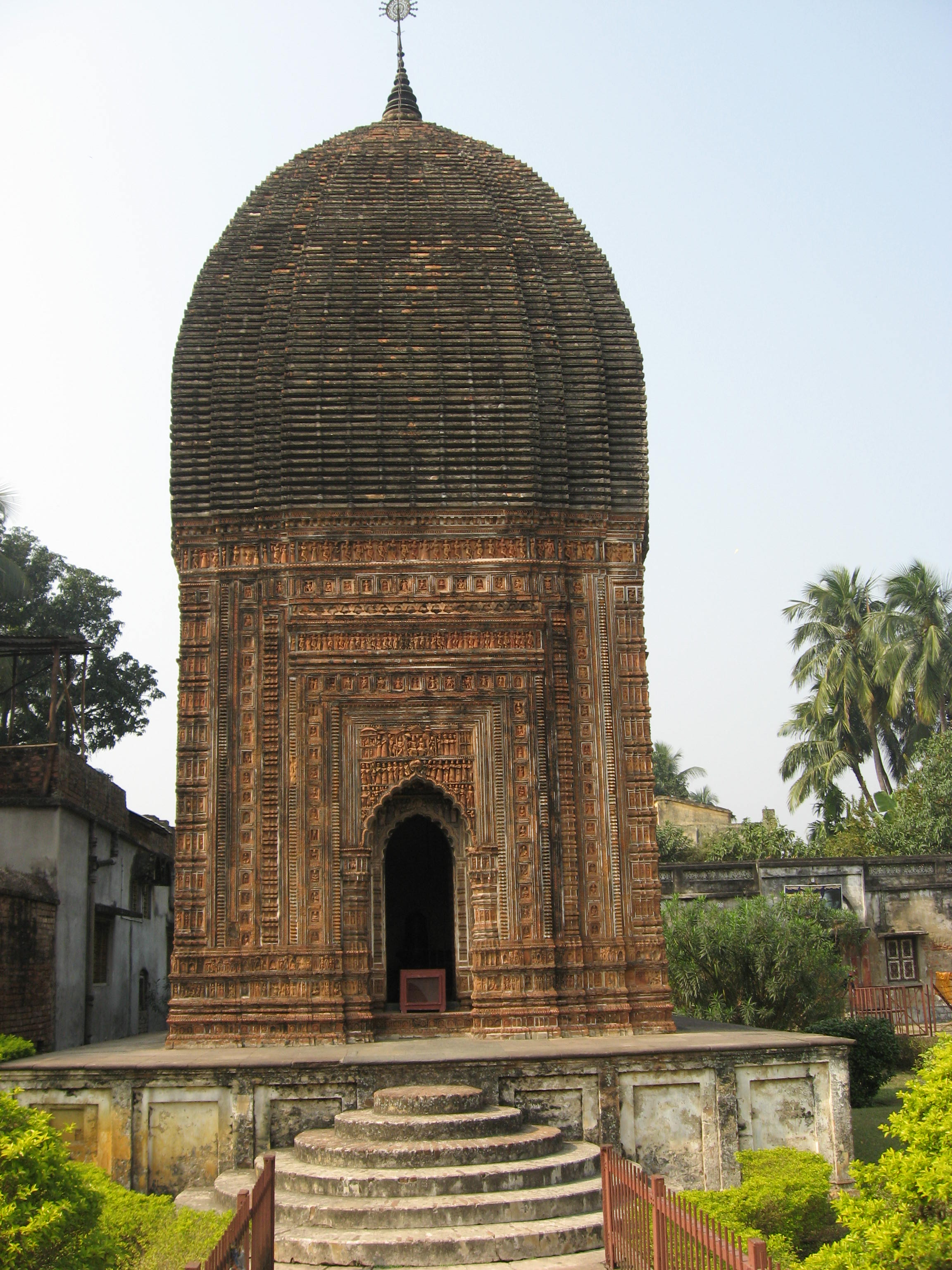
Pratapeswar Temple

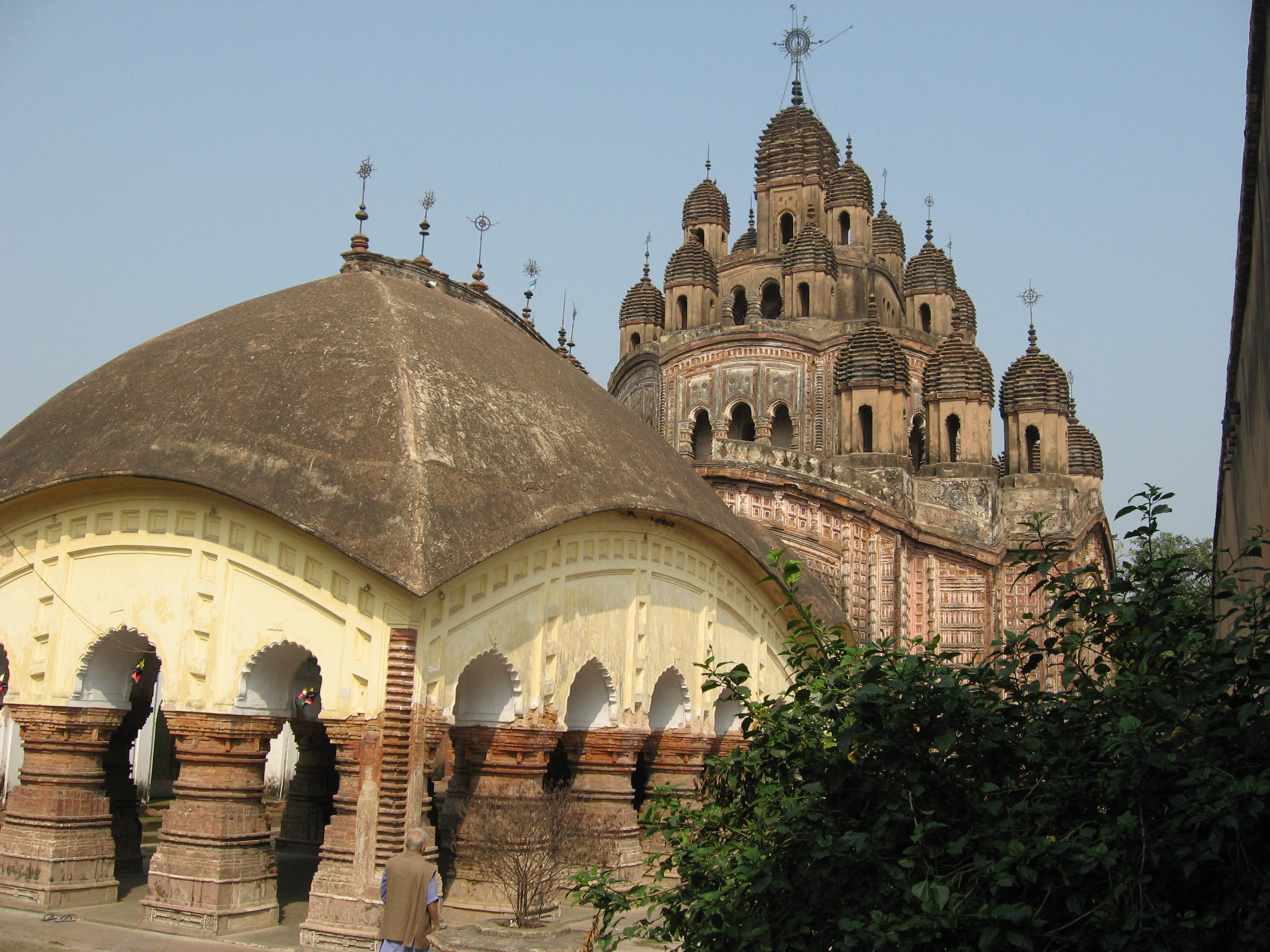
Lalji Temple

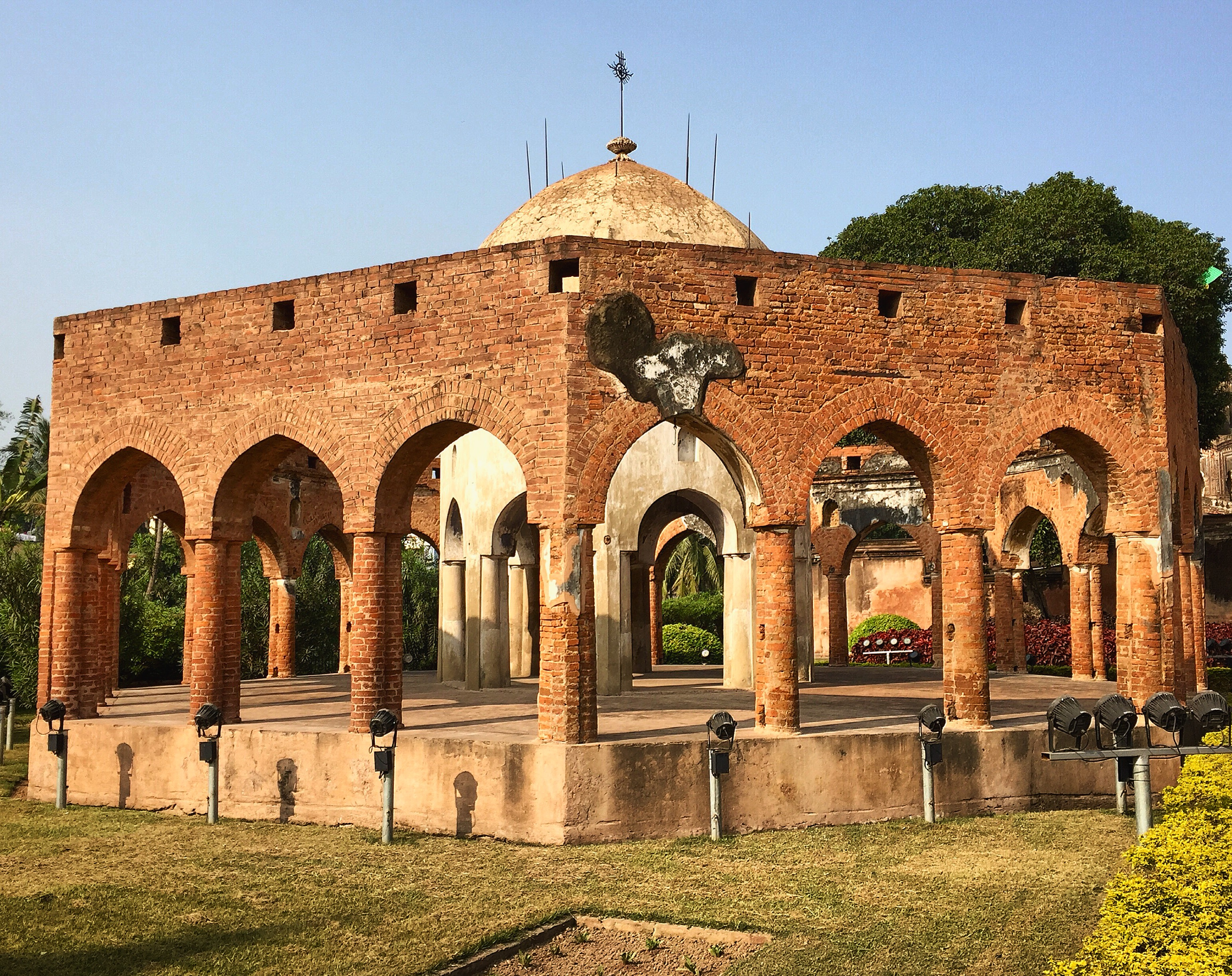
Ras Mancha at the Kalna Temple Complex in Barddhaman

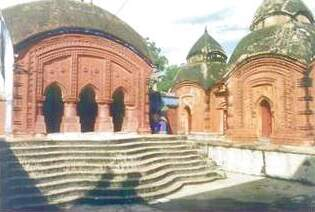
Siddheswari Kalibari

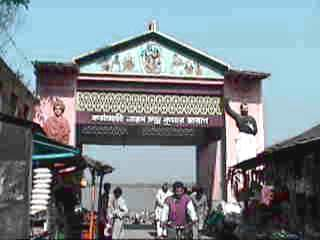
Pathuria Mahal Ghat

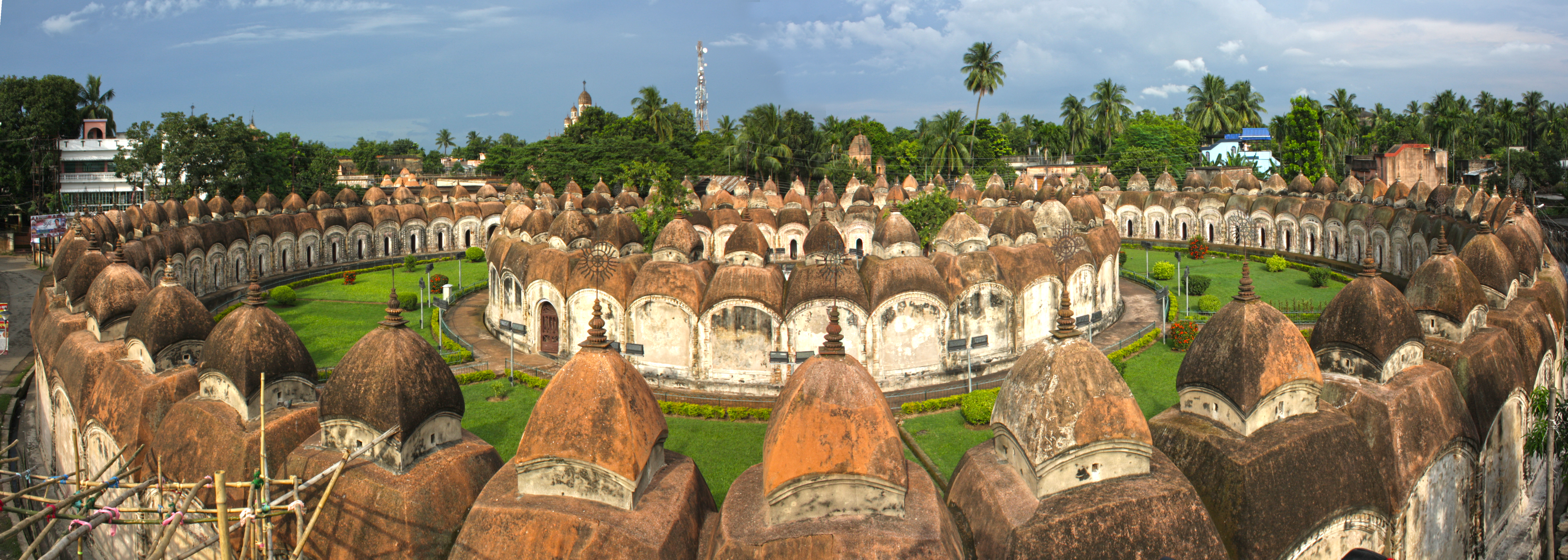
Nava-Kailasha Temple in Kalna

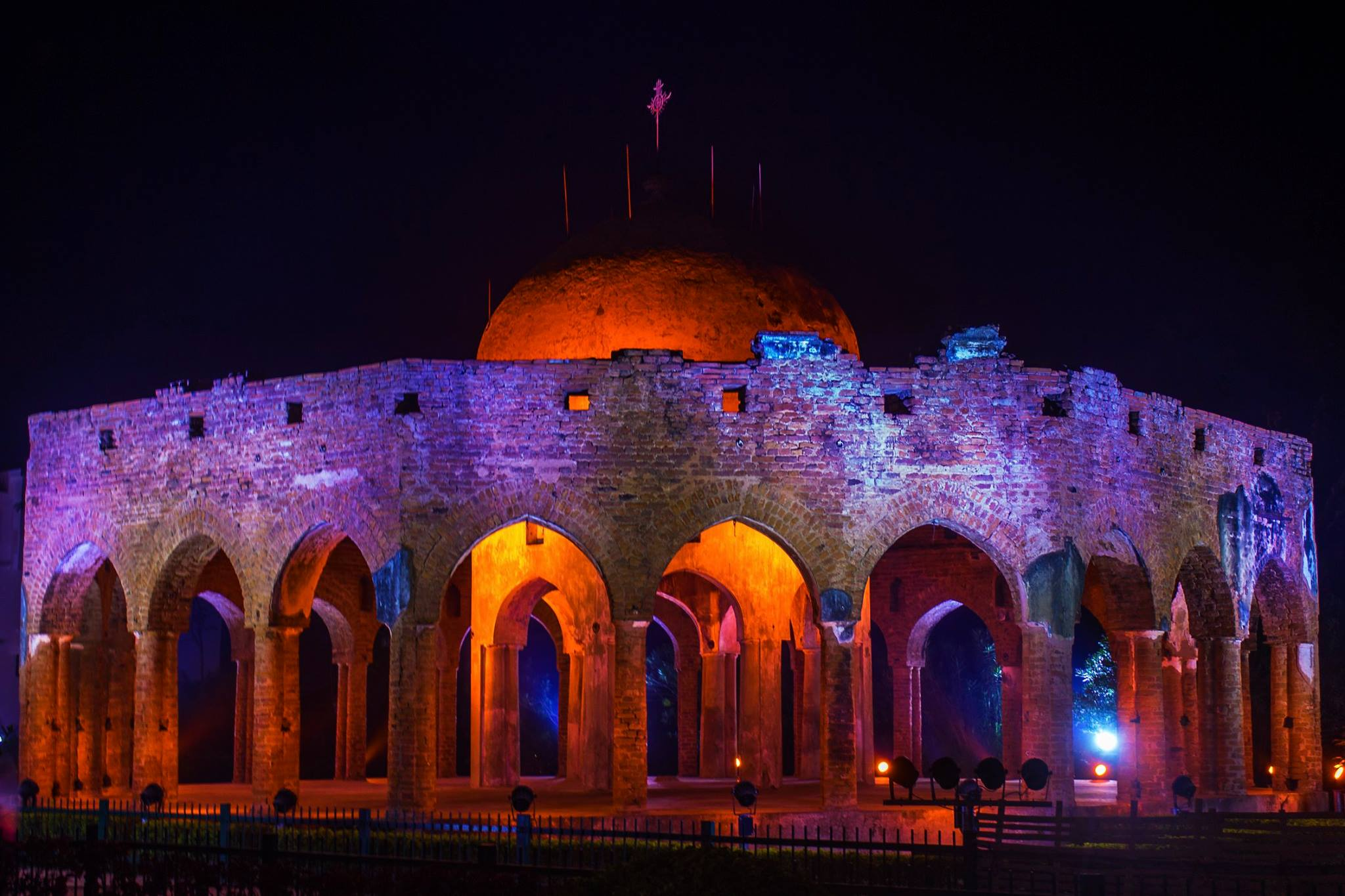
Kalna Ras Manch, Illuminated at Night

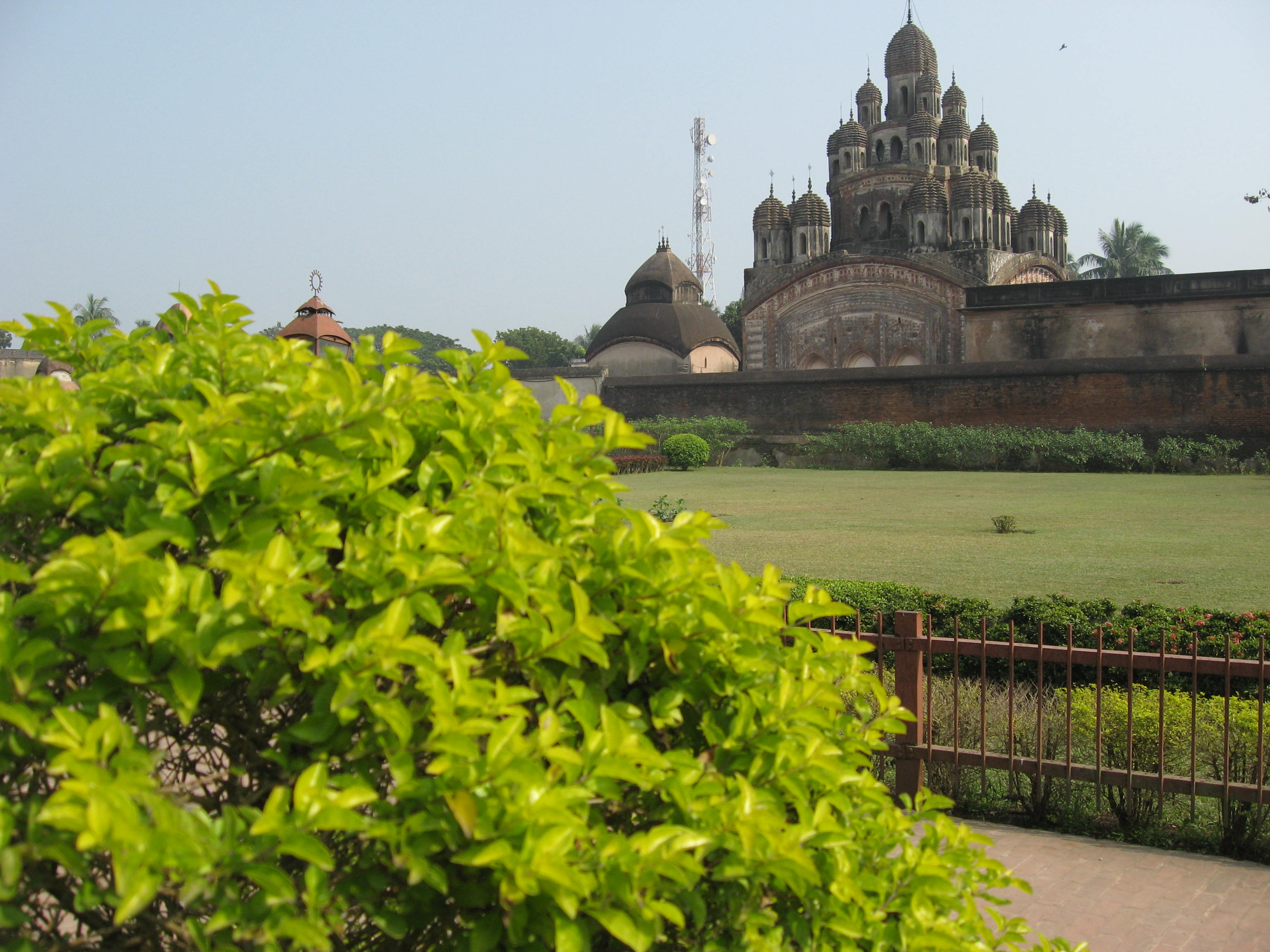
Kalna Temple Complex

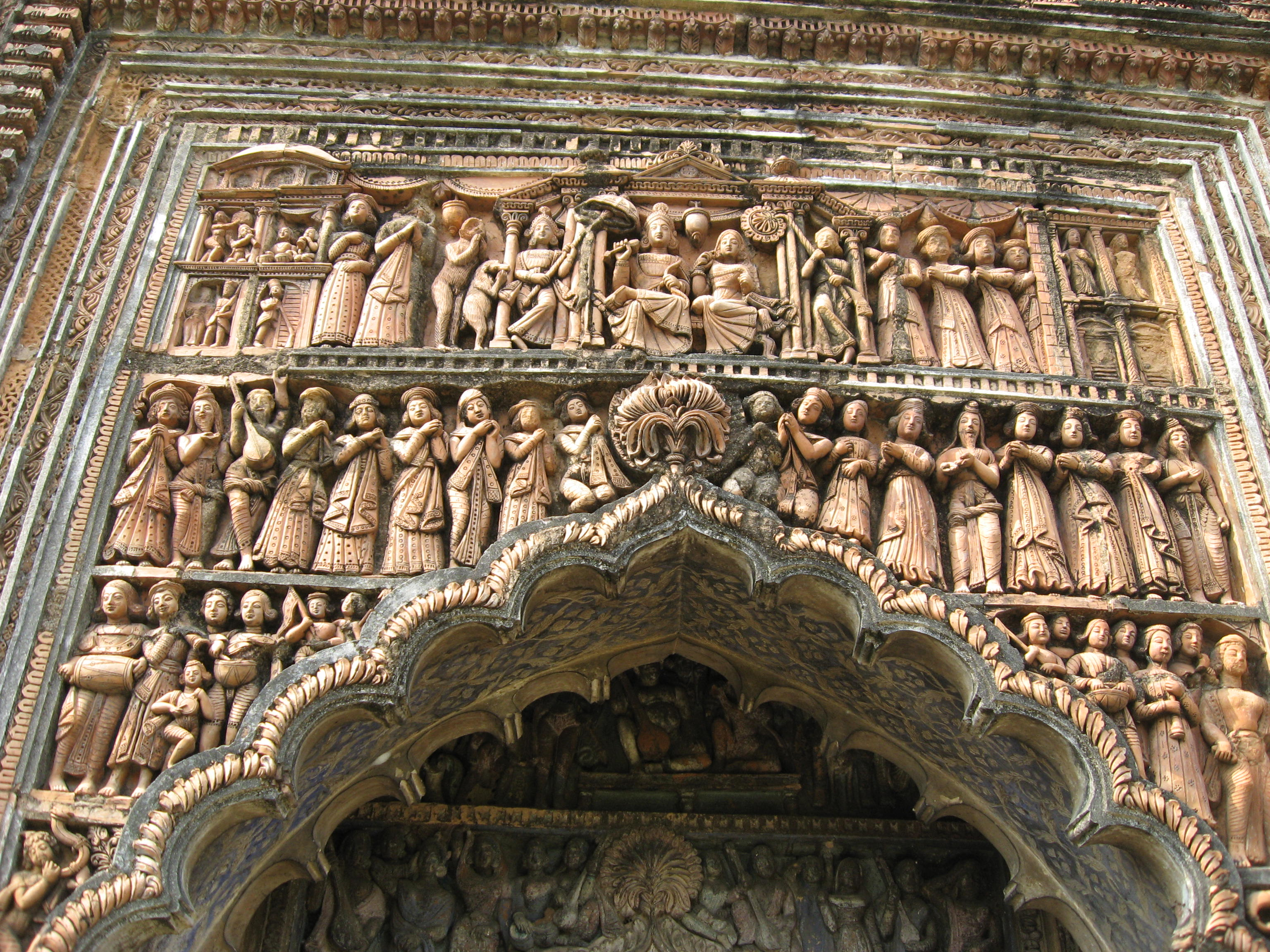
Kalna Pratapeswar Temple Terracotta Works

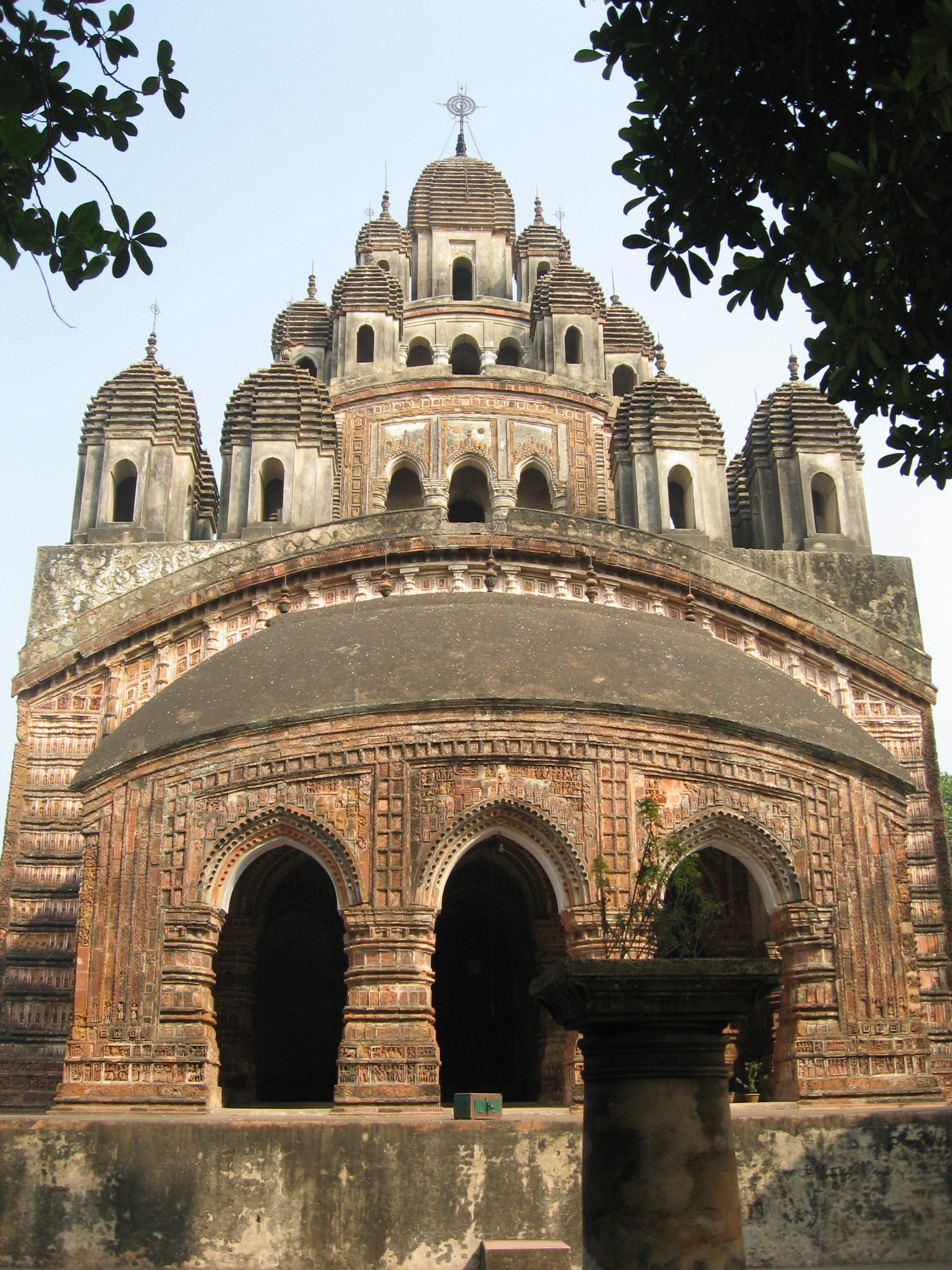
Krishna Chandraji Temple

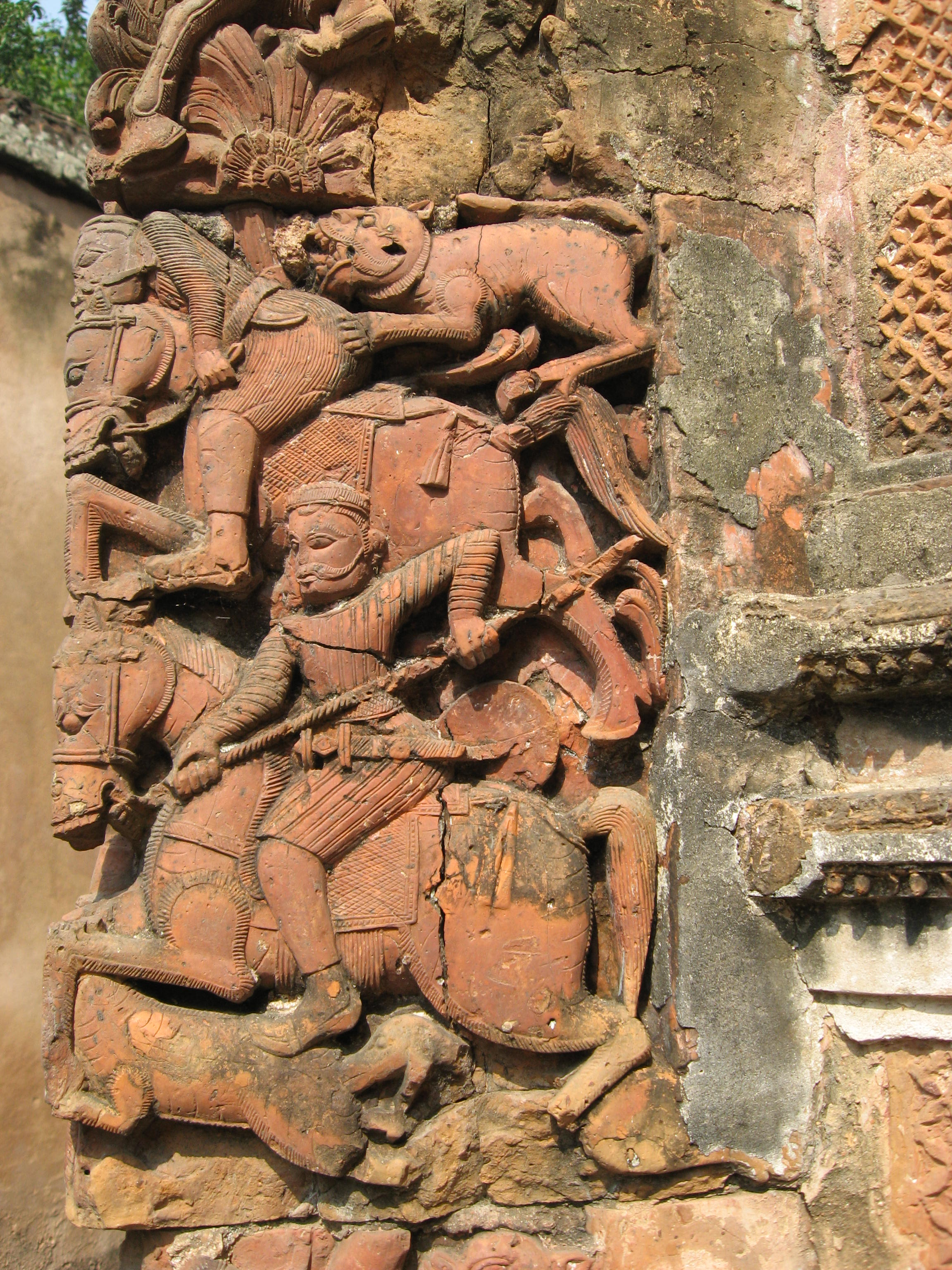
Lalji Temple Terracotta Works

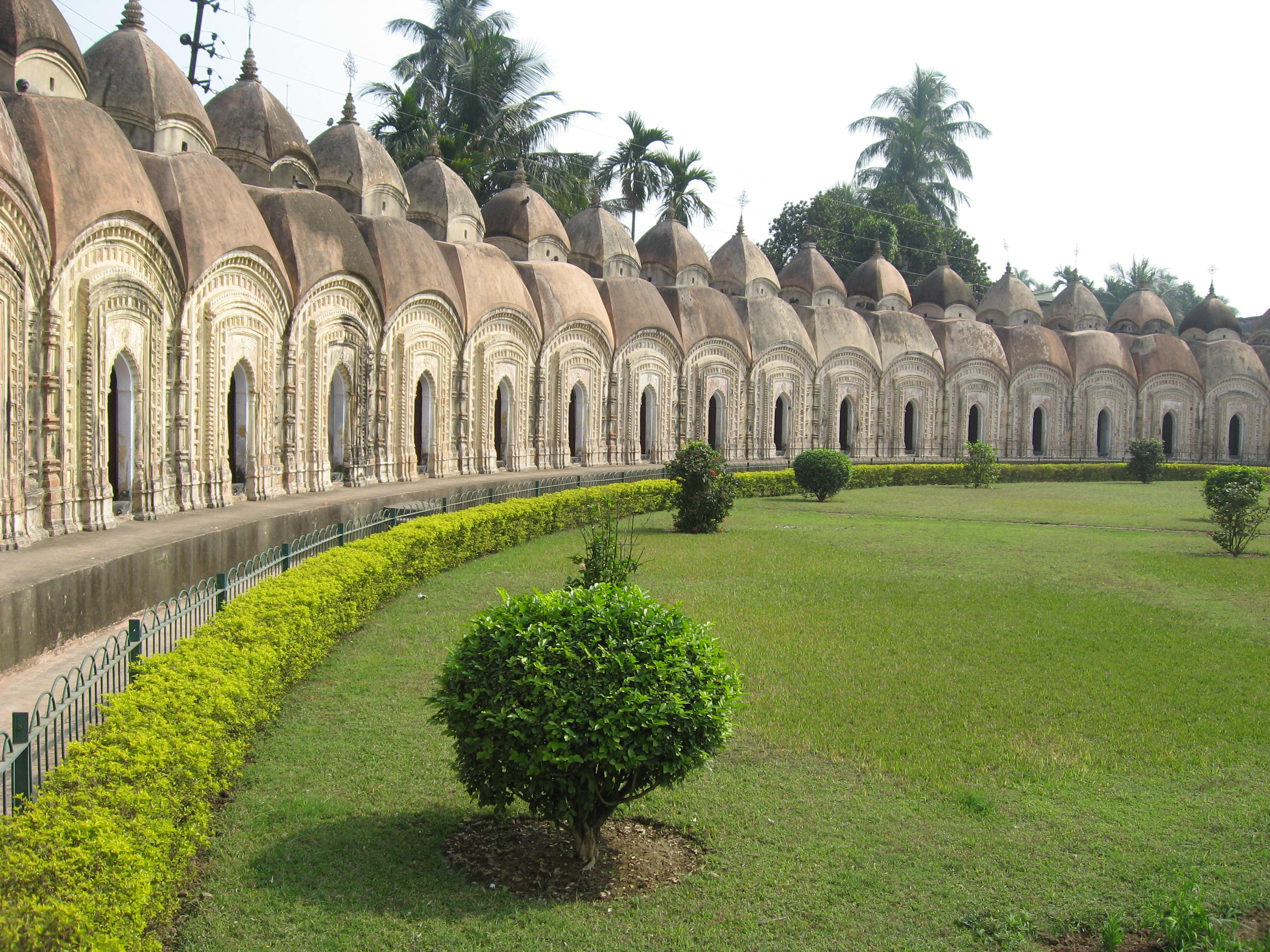
108 Siva Temple Outer circle

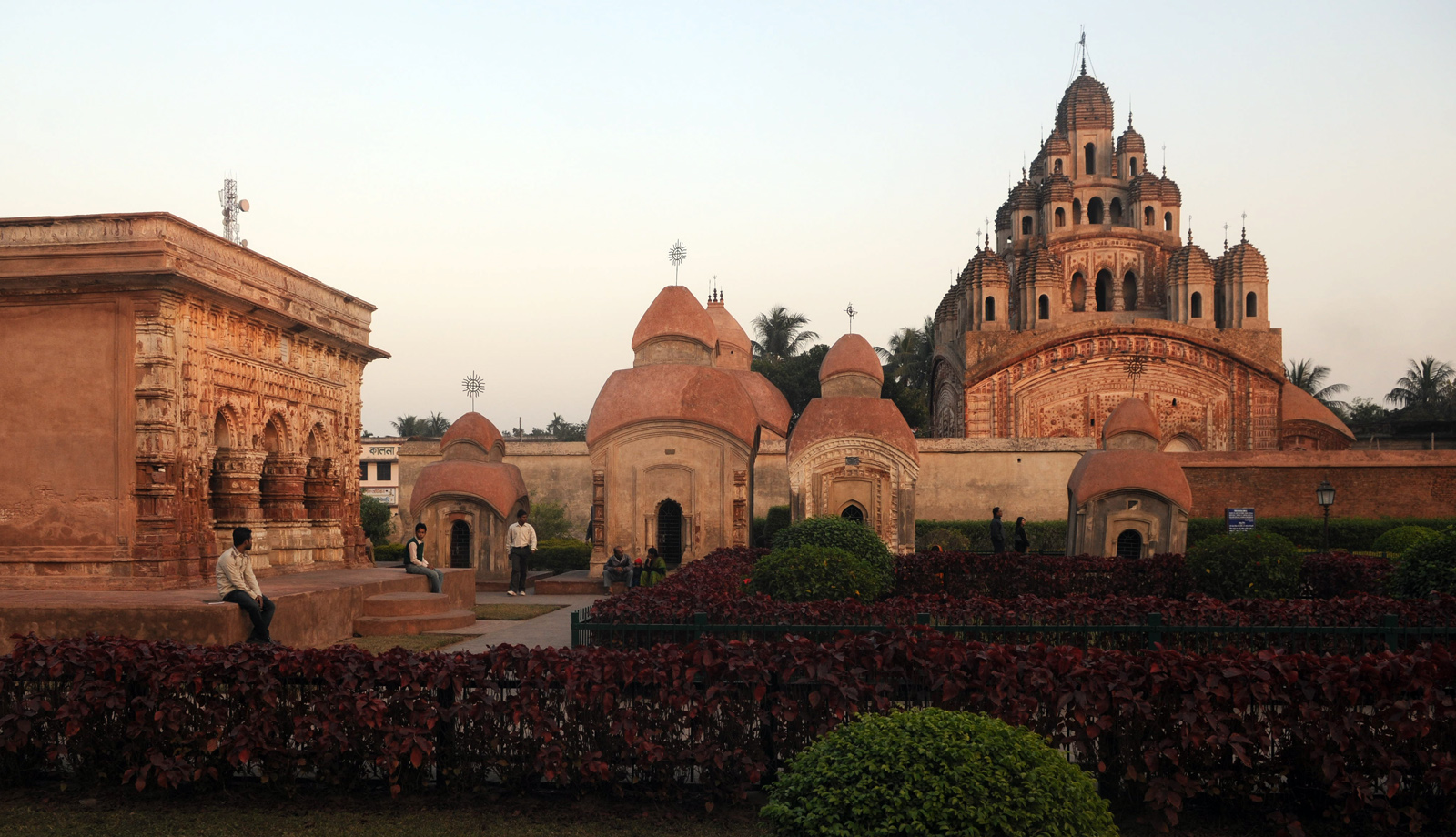
Group of temples at Kalna in Burdwan, West Bengal

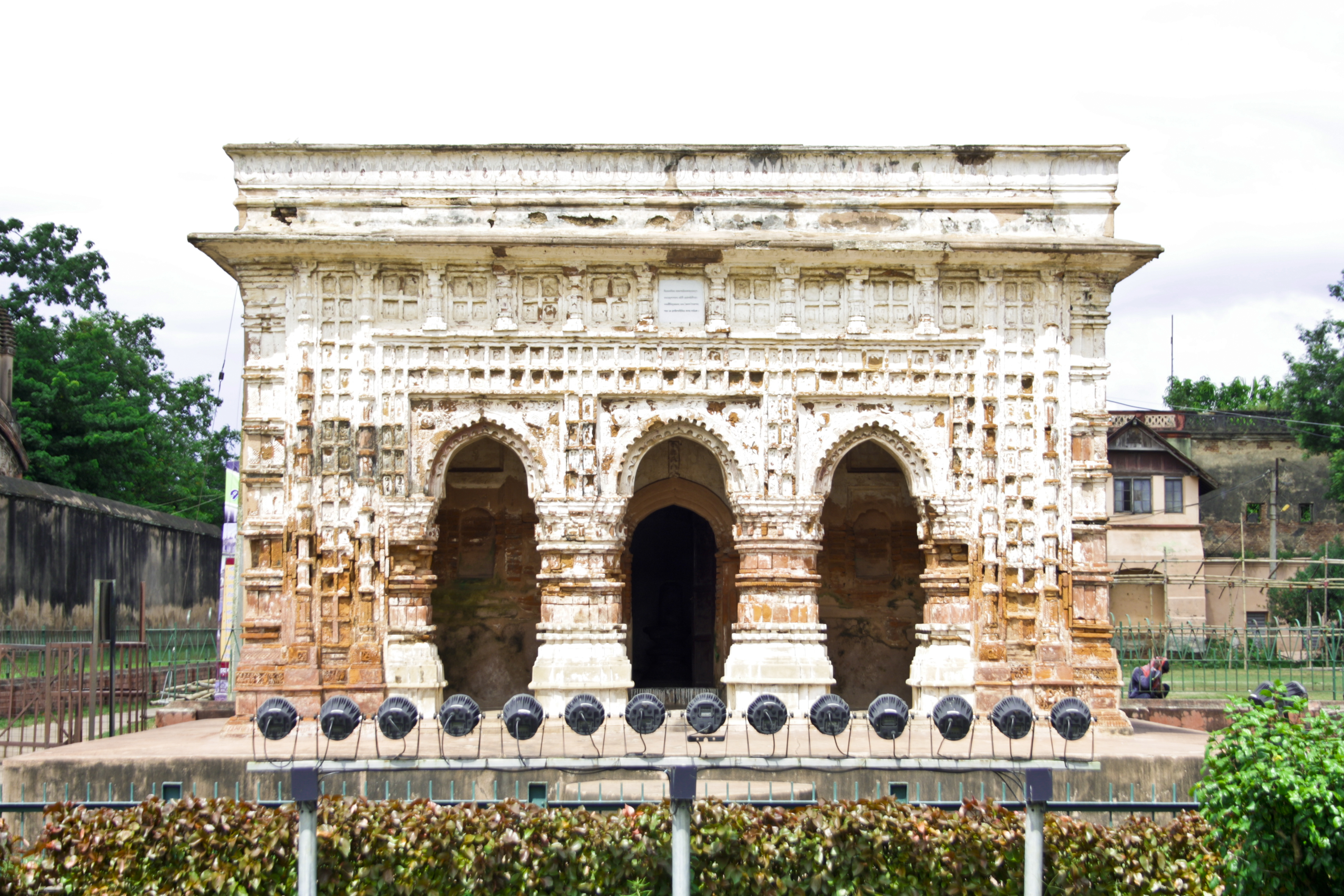
Rupeswar Temple in Kalna
