= Nandy (surname) =

Nandy or Nandi (Bengali: নন্দী) is a Bengali surname (meaning pleasing, from Sanskrit ānand) which is commonly found among the Bengali Kayasthas, Tantis, Teli or Tilis, Shankharis (Conch Shell seller) in Indian States of West Bengal, Assam, Tripura and in Bangladesh.

== Notable people with the surname ==
- Amitava Nandy (born 1943), Indian politician
- Anshuman Nandi, Indian child actor
- Abhilasha Gupta Nandi, Indian politician
- Arnab Nandi (born 1987), Indian cricketer
- Ashis Nandy (born 1937), Indian academic
- Basabi Nandi (1935–2018), Indian actress and singer
- Bibhuti Bhusan Nandy (1940–2008), Indian intelligence official
- Bishweshwar Nandi, Indian gymnast
- Dipak Nandy (born 1936), Indian academic and politician in the UK
- Dibyendu Nandi, Indian space scientist
- Jyotirindranath Nandi (1912–1982), Indian writer
- Jyotirindra Nath Nandi metro station, Kolkata, India
- Krishna Kanta Nandi, Indian trader during British colonial rule
- Kushan Nandy (born 1972), Indian film producer
- Lisa Nandy (born 1979), British politician
- Manindra Chandra Nandy (1860–1929), Maharaja of Cossimbazar Raj
- Moti Nandi (1931–2010), Indian writer and journalist
- Nand Kumar Nandi, Indian politician
- Narasimha Nandi, Indian filmmaker and writer in Telugu cinema
- Palash Nandy (born 1952), Indian cricketer, played for Bengal, later a coach
- Pranob Nandy (born 1955), Indian cricketer, played for Bengal
- Pritish Nandy (1951–2025), Indian writer and politician
- Rasikendra Nath Nandi, Indian social reformer
- Samit Kumar Nandi (born 1967), Indian veterinarian
- Sampath Nandi (born 1980), Indian filmmaker in Telugu cinema
- Sandhyakar Nandi (c. 1084 - 1155), Indian Sanskrit poet in the Pala empire, writer of Ramacharitam
- Prajapati Nandi (c 1082–1124), the Sandhi-Vigrahika (minister of peace and war) of Ramapala and father of Sandhyakar Nandi
- Sandip Nandy, Indian footballer
- Sanhita Nandi, Indian classical vocalist of Hindustani music
- Sukumar Nandi, Indian electrical engineer
- Sunil Nandy (born 1935), Indian cricketer, played for Bengal
- Vyoma Nandi, Indian actress
- Nandi (Hinduism), start of nandi dynasty
