= Bijay Chand Mahtab =

Maharaja of Bardhaman and writer

Maharajadhiraja Bahadur Sir Bijay Chand Mahtab
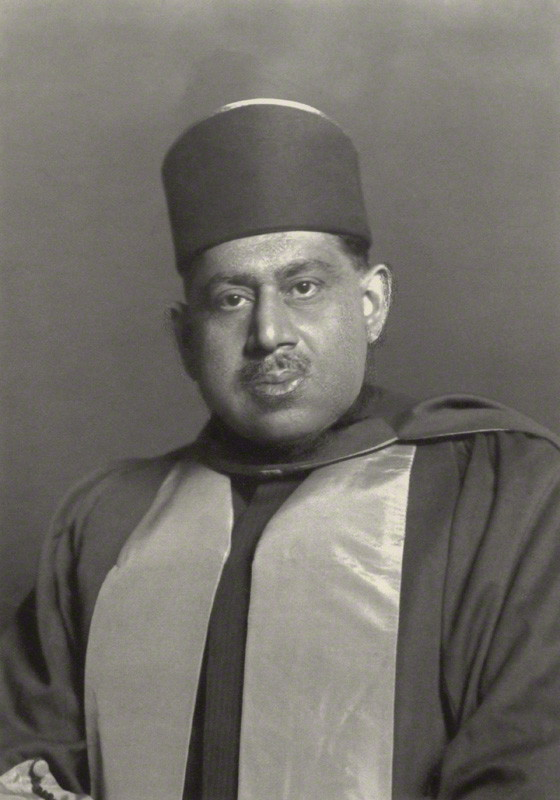
- Mahtab in 1931.
- Born: 19 October 1881; Bardhaman, Bengal Presidency, British India
- Died: 29 August 1941 (aged 59); Bardhaman, Bengal Presidency, British India (now Purba Bardhaman, West Bengal, India)

Maharajadhiraja Bahadur Sir Bijay Chand Mahtab (19 October 1881 – 29 August 1941) was the ruler of Burdwan Estate, Bengal Presidency in British India (present-day West Bengal, India) from 1887 till his death in 1941.

== Early life ==
Mahtab's predecessor, Maharaja Aftab Chand Mahtab (ruled : 1879–85) died without heirs, and his widow adopted Bijoy Chand Mahtab, son of Khatri Ban Bihari Kapur, a relative of Mahtab Chand Bahadur, a past ruler of Burdwan Estate from 1832 to 1879. At the time of adoption, in 1887, he was only six years old, therefore, the Court of Wards along with the Diwani-i-Raj, Ban Bihari Kapoor, (the natural father of Bijaychand), ruled the estate up to 1902. In 1893, the title of 'Raja' was bestowed on Ban Bihari Kapoor. The government permitted the Raj in 1897 to maintain an armed force of 600 people and 41 cannons.

In 1899, Bijay Chand Mahtab passed the entrance examination of Calcutta University, and was the first in the Raj family to obtain a formal educational qualification.

== Ruler ==
In 1902, he came of age and was invested with full ruling powers to the throne of Burdwan Raj. Next year in 1903, the title of 'Rajadhiraj' was bestowed on him at the Delhi Durbar. A pompous coronation was organised in the palace at Bardhaman, where Lieutenant Governor Bourdillon was present to bestow the honour.

In 1903, he invited the Governor General Lord Curzon to the Bardhaman palace and to commemorate the event constructed a gate now known as Curzon Gate in Gothic style, which is a major landmark of Burdwan today and stands at junction of Bijaychand Road and Grand Trunk Road. The Royal Palace of Burdwan is situated one km from the gate.

In 1903, he saved the life of the Lieutenant Governor, Sir Andrew Fraser. He risked his life to save that of Sir Andrew Fraser, lieutenant-governor of Bengal, when an attempt to assassinate him was made by Indian nationalists on 7 November 1908. In return for his loyalty to the British, he was honoured with the title of K.C.I.E. and Indian Order of Merit (Class III).

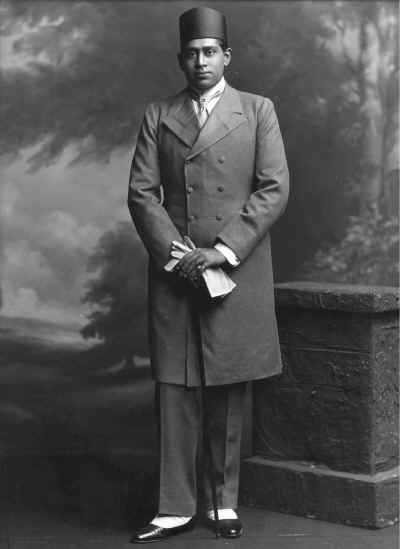
Mahtab in 1906

In 1908, as per a proclamation of Lord Minto, elevated to the title of 'Maharajadhiraja', which was bestowed on a hereditary basis.

He also served as representative of Bengal zamindars in Legislative and Provincial council, continuously for many years.

In 1908, he toured England and Europe and later wrote a book named Diary of an [sic] European Tour.

He was also noted for his philanthropy, especially in field of education and health welfare. For example, in 1908, he donated Rs. 40,000/- towards construction of hostel and other facilities for Ranchi Arts College, Ranchi, where Burdwan Raj also held large estates. Bijoy Chand Hospital was also founded by him during his reign in decade of 1910.

He was a member of the Bengal Legislative Council from 1907 to 1918, and of the Imperial Legislative Council from 1909 to 1912. He was associated with the state administration in subsequent years and Member of Executive Council of Bengal for the years 1919–1924.

He was also the President of British Indian Association from 1911 to 1918 and again in 1925.

In 1914, he was appointed as one of the members of the committee that investigated in to riots of Budge Budge and Komagata Maru incident

In 1924, he was one of the members of a committee headed by Sir Charles Todhunter, which looked into taxation reforms in British India, which submitted its report in 1925. and was also the member of Indian Reforms Enquiry Commission of 1924.

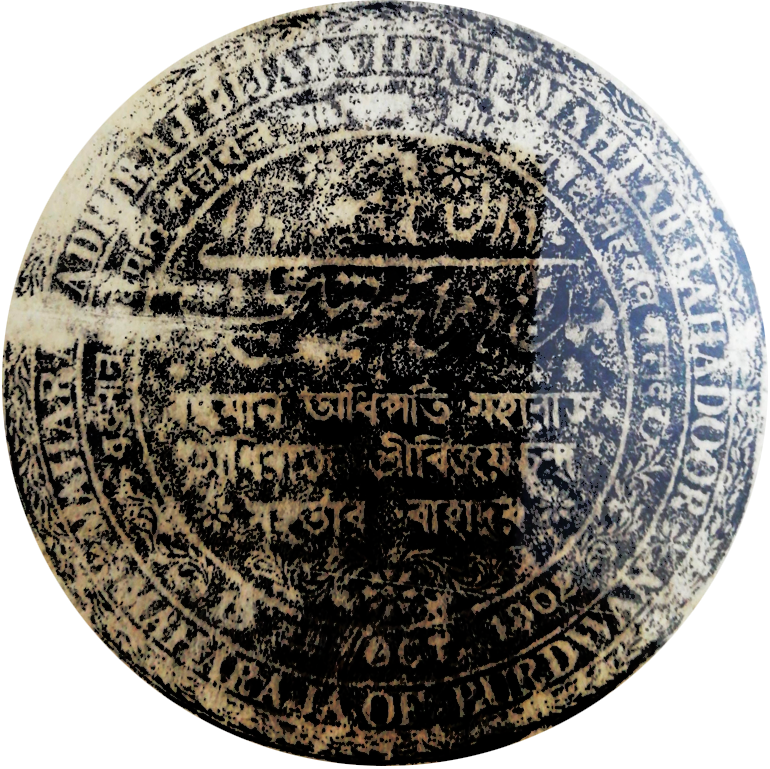
Official seal of Bijay Chand Mahtab

In spite of his loyalty towards the British, he provided warm hospitality to Mahatma Gandhi, when he visited Bardhaman in 1925 and welcomed cordially Subhas Chandra Bose when he visited Bardhaman in 1928 to campaign in the municipal elections.

In 1935, the Indian Weightlifting Federation was formed, and he served as its first President.

During the later part of his rule, however, there were allegations of financial corruption coupled with mismanagement and the affairs of the Raj were in shambles. The British administrator took over the complete management of Burdwan Raj and Bijoy Chand was deprived of management from the years 1929–1936.

In 1936, he was handed back the reign of his Estate by British.

In 1938, he was a member of the Francis Floud Commission to suggest changes in the Permanent Settlement of 1793. The commission recommended the replacement of the zamindari system by a ryotwari (tenancy) system in which the ownership of land would vest with the ryot (tenant) and the land revenue payable by him could be revised periodically. The recommendations could not be implemented because of differences in the Fazlul Huq ministry.

However, with the India's independence gaining momentum it was evident that the days of zemindars and princely states were coming to an end. It was this realisation that led Bijaychand Mahtab to extend indirect support to the Congress.

== Writer ==
Bijaychand Mahtab was deeply involved with Bengali literature. He was president of the reception committee in the 8th session of the Bangya Sahitya Sammelan held at Bardhaman in 1914. From amongst the twenty books he wrote, mention may be made of Impression, The Indian Horizon, Meditation, Studies, Vijaygitika (collection of songs composed by him), Troyodashi (poem), Ranjit (play), and Manaslila (science-play).

== Death and successor ==
Mahtab died on 29 August 1941 at Burdwan. His reign which began in 1887 and lasted till 1941, was the longest in history of Bardhaman Raj. He left behind two sons Uday Chand and Abhay Chand and two daughters, thereby ending the long history adoptions for succession in Burdwan Raj. His elder son Uday Chand Mahtab, succeeded him to the throne of Burdwan Raj.

== Titles ==
- Rajadhiraja – 1893
- Maharajadhiraja – 1903
- Maharajadhiraja Bahadur – 1906 (made hereditary)

== Honours ==
- Delhi Durbar Medal – 1902
- Indian Order of Merit – 3rd class (Civil division) – 1909
- Knight Commander of the Order of the Indian Empire – 1909
- Knight Commander of the Order of the Star of India – 1911
- Knight Grand Commander of the Order of the Indian Empire – 1924

Bijay Chand Mahtab Kapoor-Mahtab Dynasty Born: 19 October 1881 Died: 29 August 1941
Regnal titles
Preceded by Aftab Chand Mahtab	Maharajadhiraja of Bardhaman Raj; 1887–1941	Succeeded by Uday Chand Mahtab
