= Bardhaman Raj =

Princely state of the British India

- Coat of arms

Area
  - Total: 12,949.94 km^{2} (5,000.00 sq mi)
- Today part of: West Bengal

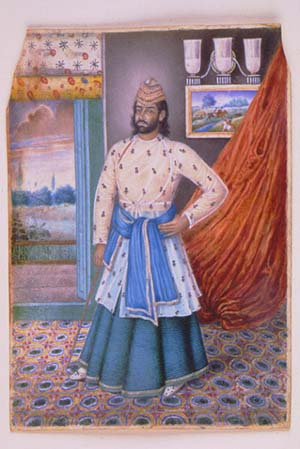
Mehtab Chand of Burdwan, c. 1860–65

The Bardhaman Raj (Bengali: বর্ধমান রাজ, Bengali pronunciation: [Bôrdhoman Raj], Punjabi: ਬਰਧਮਾਨ ਰਾਜ), also known as Burdwan Raj, was a zamindari Raja estate that flourished between 1657 and 1955 in the Indian state of West Bengal. Maharaja Sangam Rai Kapoor, a Punjabi Khatri from Kotli mahalla in Lahore, Punjab, who was the first member of the family to settle in Bardhaman, was the original founder of the house of Bardhaman, whereas his grandson Abu Rai, during whose time the zamindari started flourishing, is considered to be the patriarch of the Bardhaman Raj family.

Maharaja Kirti Chand Rai (1702–1740) extended the estates far and wide by attacking and defeating the Raja of Bishnupur. At its height in the early 19th century, it extended to around 5,000 square miles (13,000 km) and included many parts of what is now Burdwan, Bankura, Medinipur, Howrah, Hooghly and Murshidabad districts. The dominion had over 2 million people in population. After his victory against the king of Vishnupur, he constructed a victory gate, Baraduari (the outer gate), at Kanchannagar in Bardhaman. In the 20th century, it covered an area of 2,689 sq mi or 6,960 km^{2}.

== History ==
=== Sangam Rai ===
According to the tradition of the family, Sangam Rai, a Khatri of the Kapoor clan, from Kotli in Lahore district, was the founder of the house of Bardhaman. He, on his way back from a pilgrimage to Puri, being much impressed with the advantages of Baikunthapur, a village near Bardhaman town in present-day Purba Bardhaman district of West Bengal, settled there permanently and devoted himself to commerce and money lending. From this period onwards the history of the family is identical with that of the Bardhaman district. During the battle between Jagirdar Sher Afghan of Bardhaman and Him he won. As a reward, in 1610, the Emperor of Delhi conferred upon him the titles of Char Hazari Kotwal and Munsifdar.

=== Banku Behari Rai ===
Sangam Rai's son Banku Behari Rai was also a Kotwal. The title of Rai-Raiyan was conferred upon him. He was also involved in his family business. Not much is known about him.

=== Abu Rai ===
Abu Rai, the son of Banku Behari Rai, was appointed Choudhuri and Kotwal of Rekhabi Bazar in Bardhaman in 1657 under the Faujdar of Chakla Bardhaman. He is considered to be the patriarch of the Bardhaman Raj family as it was during his time the zamindari started flourishing and the zamindari was firmly established.

=== Babu Rai ===
Babu Rai, the son of Abu Rai, was the first in the family to completely do away with the family business and invest more time in buying and managing profitable zamindari estates. He owned Pargana Bardhaman along with three other estates.

=== Ghana Shyam Rai ===
After the death of Babu Rai, his son, Ghana Shyam Rai, succeeded him.

=== Krishna Ram Rai ===
Upon Ghana Shyam Rai's death, his son, Krishna Ram Rai (1675–1696), succeeded to the zamindari. Among many other new estates he also acquired Pargana Senpahari. In 1689, he was honoured with a farman from Mughal Emperor Aurangzeb in the 38th year of his reign. This confirmed his title as the Zamindar and Choudhuri of Pargana Bardhaman.

During his reign, in 1696, Sobha Singha, the zamindar of Chitua and Barda (in Medinipur District), then a part of Bardhaman Raj, with the help of Rahim Khan, an Afghan chief, started rebelling against the zamindar of Bardhaman. Their united forces advanced towards Bardhaman and in a battle killed Krishna Chand and captured his family members, except his son Jagat Ram Rai, who somehow managed to escape to seek the help of the governor of Bengal, Behar and Orissa. In an incident, Sobha Singha was killed by Raj Kumari Satyabati, the daughter of Krishna Ram Rai. After the death of Sobha Singha, the insurgents then elected Afghan chief Rahim Khan to be their commander. Under his leadership, the rebellion assumed so threatening an aspect that the emperor appointed his own grandson Azim-u-Shan to the government of Bengal, Behar and Orissa. In the meantime, Zabardust Khan, son of the nawab, had by a series of successful movements driven them back upon Bardhaman. They were finally defeated just outside the town by Azim-u-Shan and their leader Rahim Khan was killed.

=== Jagat Ram Rai ===
Afterwards, Jagat Ram Rai (1699–1702), was restored to the estate and honours of his father. He made further additions to his family estate. He was honoured by Mughal Emperor Aurangzeb with a farman. He was treacherously murdered in 1702. He left two sons- Kirti Chand Rai and Mitra Sen Rai.

=== Kirti Chand Rai ===
Kirti Chand Rai (1702–1740), the eldest among the two sons of Jagat Ram Rai, inherited the ancestral zamindari. He expanded it further by acquiring the Parganas of Chitua, Bhurshut, Barda and Manoharshahi. Kirti Chand was a man of adventurous spirit. He fought with the Rajas of Chandrakona and Barda near Ghatal (a part of Paschim Medinipur district of West Bengal), and possessed their kingdoms. He also seized the estate of Balghara situated near the holy town of Tarakeswar in Hooghly district. He then proceeded to Murshidabad and had his name registered as a proprietor of new properties. The boldest achievement of Kirti Chand was his attacking, defeating the powerful Raja of Bishnupur Kingdom.

=== Raja Chitra Sen Rai ===
Kirti Chand died in 1740 and was succeeded by Chitra Sen Rai (1740–1744), who added the parganas of Mandalghat, Arsha and Chandrakona to his paternal estate. He was first in the family to be invested with the title of Raja by the Delhi Emperor.

=== Maharajadhiraj Bahadur Tilak Chand Rai ===
Chitra Sen Rai died in 1744 without issue and was succeeded by his cousin Tilak Chand Rai (1744–1770), who was honoured by the emperor Ahmad Shah with a farman confirming his right to the raj and was after a few years, invested with the title of Maharaj Adhiraj Bahadur and Panj Hazari (commander of five thousand troops) by emperor Shah Alam. Three years after the battle of Plassey, on 27 September 1760, the zamindari of Bardhaman, together with the districts of Midnapur and Chittagong, was ceded to the East India Company by Nawab Mir Muhammad Kashim Khan, the governor of Bengal. At that time Bardhaman contained an area of 5,174 square miles and was considered the most productive district in Subah of Bengal. But the country was in an unsettled state and the company didn't find the acquisition as profitable as they had hoped.

=== Maharajadhiraj Bahadur Tej Chand Rai ===
When Tilak Chand Rai died at the young age of 26 in 1770, his son Tej Chand Rai (b.1764 - d.1832) was just six years old. So, his mother Maharani Bishan Kumari managed the estate with the help of Dewan Ram Narayan Chowdhury (1719-1818) The elder son of Mahatran Nakur Chandra Chowdhury (1664–1756) of Baikunthapur Chowdhury familial connection Since 1779, Tej Chand Bahadur started managing the estate by himself.

In 1791, Maharaja Tej Chand's sixth wife Rani Nanaki Kumari gave birth to his only surviving son Pratap Chand Rai. After his mother died within 2 days of his birth, he was raised with much love and affection by his grandmother Bishan Kumari. He was called "Chota Raja" by his subjects and was universally loved and respected. Due to the conspiracies of Tej Chand's fifth queen Kamal Kumari and her brother Paran Chand Kapur, Pratap Chand disappeared in 1821 during the lifetime of his father and was never heard afterwards.

Several years later, a pretender impersonating him appeared but his claim, without a proper investigation, was dismissed by a civil court.

=== His Highness Maharajadhiraj Bahadur Mahtab Chand Rai ===
In 1832, Tej Chandra died at the age of 68. In 1827, due to the insistence of his wife Kamal Kumari, Maharaja Tej Chand adopted the youngest son of Paran Chand Kapur (Kamal Kumari's brother) named Chuni Lal Kapur, giving him a new name Mahtab Chand Rai (b.1820), and leaving him his great landed and funded estates. Maharaja Tej Chand's youngest wife, Rani Basanta Kumari, was Mahtab Chand's elder sister and a daughter of Paran Chand Kapur. She eloped and married Dakshinaranjan Mukherjee, a famous lawyer and Young Bengal member around 1835.

In 1864, the Maharaja was appointed an additional member of the Viceregal Legislative Council, being the first native person of Bengal who was so honoured.

=== Maharajadhiraj Bahadur Aftab Chand Mahtab ===
After Mahatab Chand's death, he was succeeded by his adopted son Aftab Chand Mahtab, who only lived until 1885. Aftab Chand left a widow whom he had empowered to adopt and she exercised the right in July, 1887 in favour of Sir Bijay Chand Mahtab Bahadur, who became the zamindar of Burdwan.

=== Maharajadhiraj Bahadur Bijay Chand Mahtab ===
His predecessor, Maharaja Aftab Chand Mahtab died without heirs, and his widow adopted Bijay Chand Mahtab, son of Ban Behari Kapur, a relative of Mahtab Chand Bahadur, a past ruler of Bardhaman Estate. At the time of adoption, in 1887, he was only a child, therefore, the Court of Wards along with the Diwani-i-Raj, Ban Behari Kapoor, (the natural father of Bijay Chand), ruled the estate up to 1902. In 1893, the title of 'Raja' was bestowed on Ban Bihari Kapoor. The government permitted the Raj in 1897 to maintain an armed force of 600 people and 41 cannons.

In 1899, Bijay Chand Mahtab passed the entrance examination of Calcutta University, and was the first in the Raj family to obtain a formal educational qualification.

In 1902, he came of age and was invested with full ruling powers to the throne of Bardaman Raj. Next year in 1903, the title of 'Rajadhiraj' was bestowed on him at the Delhi Durbar. A pompous coronation was organised in the palace at Bardhaman, where Lieutenant Governor Bourdillon was present to bestow the honour.

In 1903, he invited the Governor General Lord Curzon to the Bardhaman palace and to commemorate the event constructed a gate now known as Curzon Gate in Gothic style, which is a major landmark of Bardhaman today and stands at junction of Bijoychand Road and Grand Trunk Road. The Royal Palace of Bardhaman is situated one km from the gate.

In 1903, he saved the life of the Lieutenant Governor, Sir Andrew Fraser. He risked his life to save that of Sir Andrew Fraser, lieutenant-governor of Bengal, when an attempt to assassinate him was made by Indian nationalists on 7 November 1908. In return for his loyalty to the British, he was honoured with the title of K.C.I.E. and Indian Order of Merit (Class III).

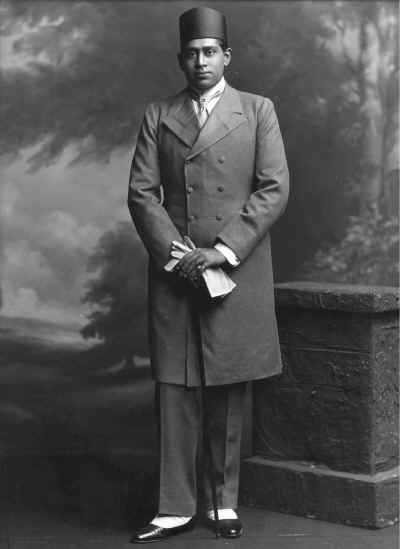
Mahtab in 1906.

In 1908, as per a proclamation of Lord Minto, elevated to the title of 'Maharajadhiraja', which was bestowed on a hereditary basis.

He also served as representative of Bengal zamindars in Legislative and Provincial council, continuously for many years.

In 1908, he toured England and Europe and later wrote a book named Diary of an [sic] European Tour.

He was also noted for his philanthropy, especially in field of education and health welfare. For example, in 1908, he donated Rs. 40,000/- towards construction of hostel and other facilities for Ranchi Arts College, Ranchi, where Burdwan Raj also held large estates. Bijoy Chand Hospital was also founded by him during his reign in decade of 1910.

He was a member of the Bengal Legislative Council from 1907 to 1918, and of the Imperial Legislative Council from 1909 to 1912. He was associated with the state administration in subsequent years and Member of Executive Council of Bengal for the years 1919–1924.

He was also the President of British Indian Association from 1911 to 1918 and again in 1925.

In 1914, he was appointed as one of the members of the committee that investigated the riots of Budge Budge and Komagata Maru incident

In 1924, he was one of the members of a committee headed by Sir Charles Todhunter, which looked into taxation reforms in British India, which submitted its report in 1925. and was also the member of Indian Reforms Enquiry Commission of 1924.

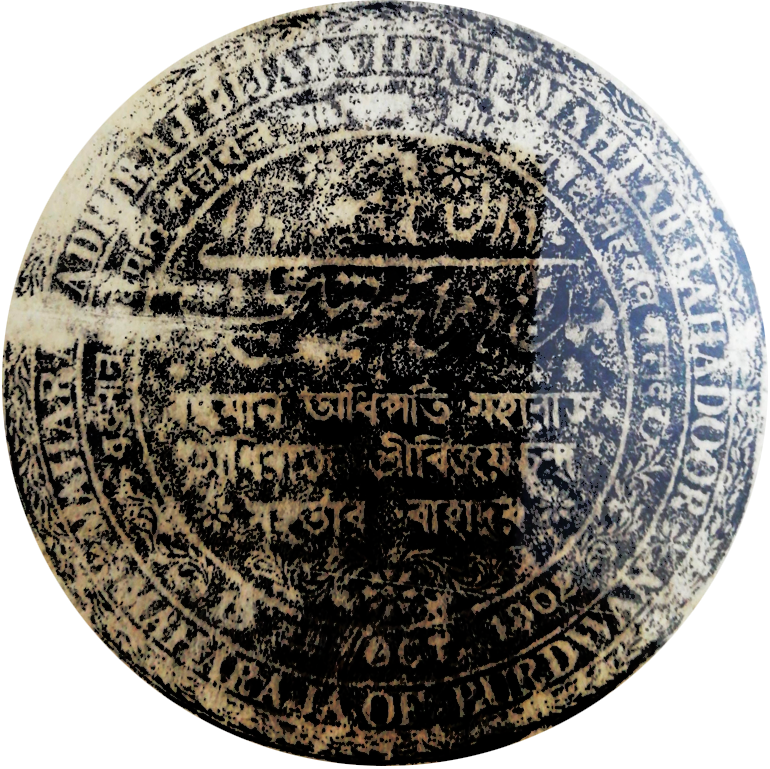
Official seal of Bijay Chand Mahtab

In spite of his loyalty towards the British, he provided warm hospitality to Mahatma Gandhi, when he visited Bardhaman in 1925 and welcomed cordially Subhas Chandra Bose when he visited Bardhaman in 1928 to campaign in the municipal elections.

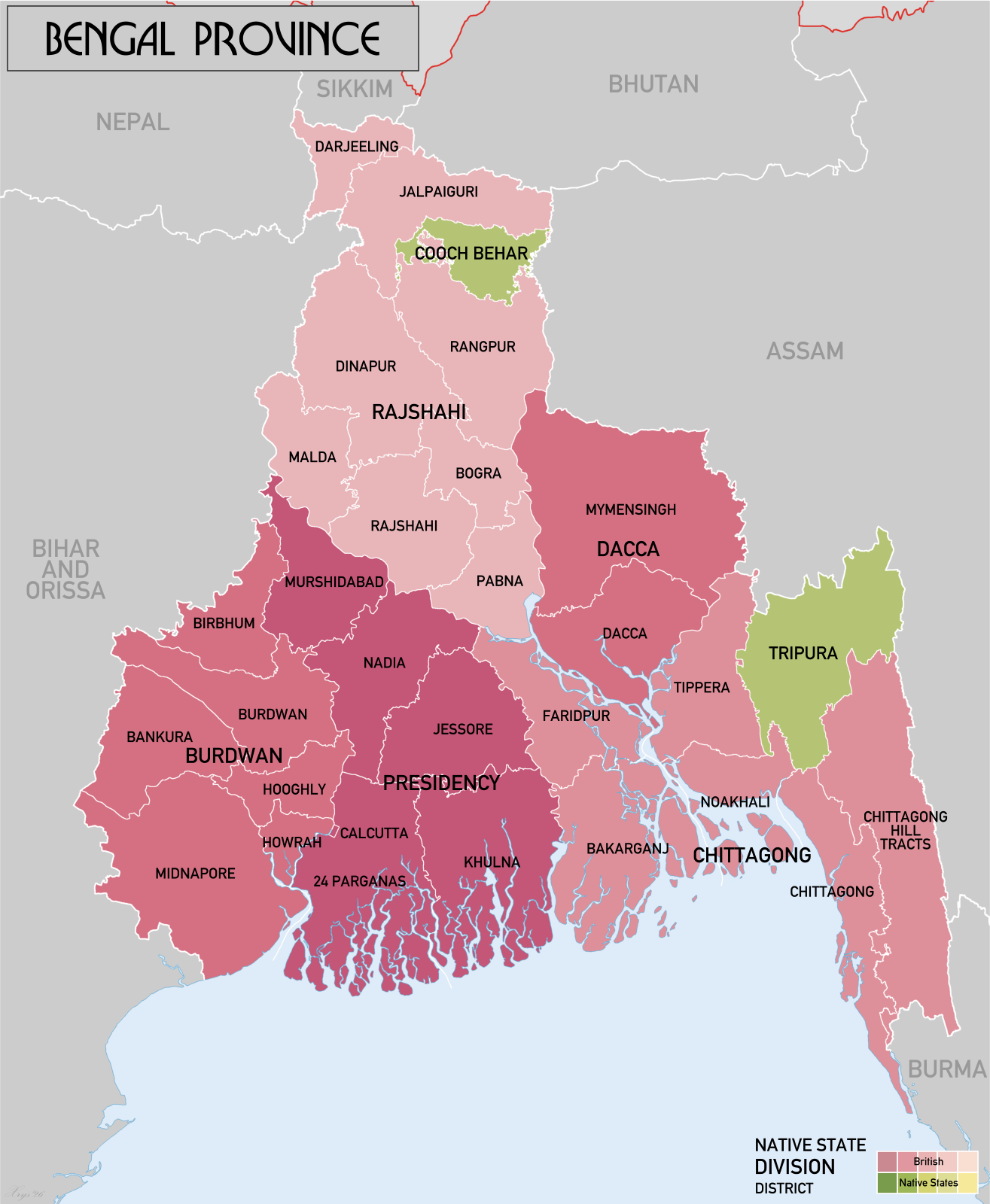
Burdwan Raj in 1931.

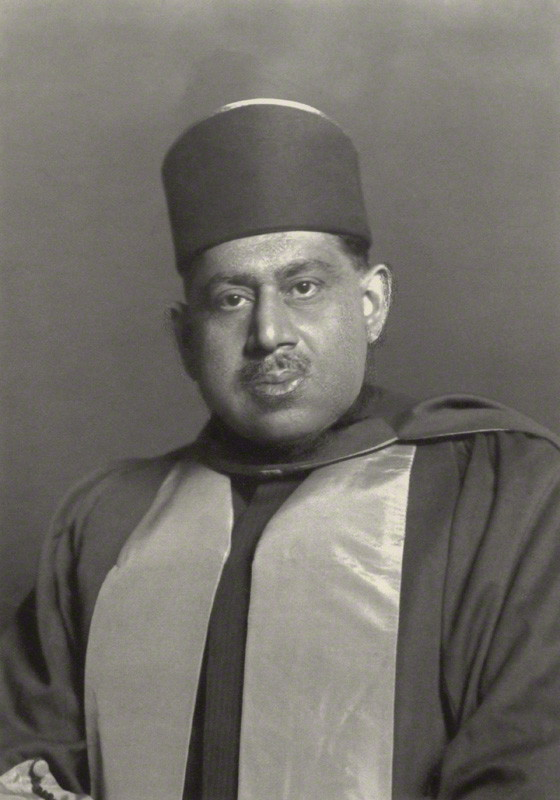
Mahtab in 1931.

During the later part of his rule, however, there were allegations of financial corruption coupled with mismanagement and the affairs of the Raj were in shambles. The British administrator took over the complete management of Bardhaman Raj and Bijoy Chand was deprived of management from the years 1929–1936.

In 1936, he was handed over the reign of his Estate back by British. In 1938, he was a member of the Francis Floud Commission to suggest changes in the Permanent Settlement of 1793. The commission recommended the replacement of the zamindari system by a ryotwari (tenancy) system in which the ownership of land would vest with the ryot (tenant) and the land revenue payable by him could be revised periodically. The recommendations could not be implemented because of differences in the Fazlul Huq ministry.

However, with the India's independence gaining momentum it was evident that the days of zemindars and princely states were coming to an end. It was this realisation that led Bijay Chand Mahtab to extend indirect support to the Congress.

Bijay Chand Mahtab was deeply involved with Bengali literature. He was president of the reception committee in the 8th session of the Bangya Sahitya Sammelan held at Bardhaman in 1914. From amongst the twenty books he wrote, mention may be made of Impression, The Indian Horizon, Meditation, Studies, Vijaygitika (collection of songs composed by him), Troyodashi (poem), Ranjit (play), and Manaslila (science-play).

Mahtab died on 29 August 1941 at Bardhaman. His reign which began in 1887 and lasted until 1941, was the longest in history of Bardhaman Raj. He left behind two sons Uday Chand and Abhay Chand and two daughters, Maharaj Kumari Lalitarani Devi and Maharaj Kumari Sudharani Devi, thereby ending the long history adoptions for succession in Bardhaman Raj. His elder son Uday Chand Mahtab, succeeded him to the throne of Burdwan Raj.

=== Maharajadhiraj Bahadur Uday Chand Mahtab ===
He was the eldest son of Bijay Chand Mahtab. He did his graduation from Presidency College, Calcutta and Calcutta University.

During the regency of his father he served as Dewan-i-Raj for several years and succeeded to the throne of Burdwan Raj after the death of his father.

During British Raj, he headed and was a member of several committees like, member of the Damodar Canal Enquiry Committee 1938, Select Committee on Calcutta Municipal (amendment) Bill 1940; Chairman of Burdwan District Flood Relief and Bengal Central Flood Relief Committees 1943–44; Chairman of Indian Red Cross Appeal (Bengal) 1943-1946 and of Calcutta War Committee 1943-1946 and of Damodar Flood Central Enquiry Committee 1944; Member of Bengal Tanks Improvement Bill Select Committee 1944 and of Advisory Committee on Terrorist Convicts in Bengal 1944; Member of West Bengal Forest Denudation Enquiry Committee 1944 and of Select Committee on Bengal Agricultural Income Tax Bill 1944; Member of the Indian Constituent Assembly - 1946–1947. He also presided the West Bengal group of Legislators, in 1946, which voted 58:21 in favor of partition of Bengal.

He served as President of the non-Muslim block of the Bengal Partition meeting in 1947 and was a member of the Legislative Assembly of Bengal from years 1937 to 1952. In the first election after independence in 1952, Sir Uday Chand Mahtab lost to a freedom fighter, Benoy Choudhury, in spite of a campaign in his favor by Jawaharlal Nehru. The election defeat was followed by legislation for abolition of the zamindari system in 1954.

After the abolition of the zamindari system in 1955, he shifted from Bardhaman to his family's house at Alipur in Calcutta. Here he became a director of IISCO, and several other leading mercantile firms of the day, such as Dunlop, Metal Box and Brooke Bond. He acceded to the request of the then Chief minister of West Bengal, Dr. Bidhan Chandra Roy and handed over his palace, Mahtab Manzil and Golap Bagh to the University of Burdwan.

He donated a piece of land in Bardhaman to the numerous employees of the Raj so that they could build accommodation there. With the end of the Raj, he immersed himself in his commercial and business interests.

He was also a Steward of the Royal Calcutta Turf Club. He instituted a fund for The Maharajadhiraja Uday Chand Mahtab Of Burdwan Memorial Cup at Calcutta Race Course.

He died on 10 October 1984 leaving behind three sons and three daughters.

== Raj Kumari Satyabati ==
During the reign of Krishna Ram Rai, when Sobha Singha, the zamindar of Chitua and Barda, along with Afghan Chief Rahim Khan captured Krishna Ram's family members after killing him. Amongst the captives of Bardhaman Raj family was Raj Kumari Satyabati, the daughter of Krishna Ram Rai, whom Sobha Singha kept in confinement until he decided to sacrifice her to his lust. When Sobha Singha tried to outrage her modesty, the heroic Raj Kumari Satyabati, drew a dagger from her clothes and stabbed him, killing him almost immediately. Feeling herself polluted by his touch, she then killed herself with the same dagger.

== List of rulers ==
The list of rulers:

Rulers and Notable Figures of the Bardhaman Raj
Name	Title / Role	Period / Reign / Dates	Duration
Sangam Rai Kapoor	Kotwal, Founder	1600s	—
Banku Behari Rai	Rai-Raiyan	—	—
Abu Rai	Kotwal Choudhuri	—	—
Babu Rai	Kotwal Choudhuri	—	—
Ghana Shyam Rai	Kotwal Choudhuri	—	—
Krishna Ram Rai	Zamindar	1675–1696	21 years
Jagat Ram Rai	Zamindar	1699–1702	3 years
Kirti Chand Rai	Zamindar	1702–1740	38 years
Chitra Sen Rai	Raja	1740–1744	4 years
Tilak Chand Rai	Maharajadhiraj Bahadur	1744–1770	26 years
Bishan Kumari	Maharani	—	—
Tej Chand Rai	Maharajadhiraj Bahadur	1770–1832	62 years (Note: Longest serving monarch of the Burdwan Raj)
Mahtab Chand	His Highness Maharajadhiraj Bahadur	1830s–1870	approx. 40 years
Aftab Chand	Maharajadhiraj Bahadur	1870s–1880	approx. 10 years
Banbehari Kapoor	Dewan of Burdwan	Mid 1880s–Mid 1890s	approx. 10 years
Sir Bijay Chand Mahtab	Maharajadhiraj Bahadur	1887–1941	54 years
Sir Uday Chand Mahtab	Maharajadhiraj Bahadur	1941–1955	14 years

== See also ==
- Burdwan House

== Footnotes ==
=== Sources ===
- McLane, John R. (2002). Land and Local Kingship in Eighteenth-Century Bengal. Cambridge University Press. ISBN 978-0-521-52654-8.
