= Sarvamangala temple =

Hindu Goddess

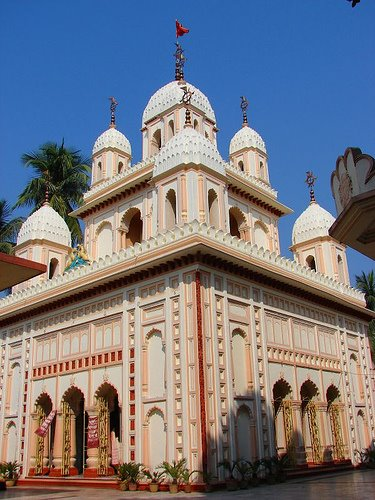
Sarvamangala temple, Bardhaman

Sarvamangala is a folk goddess of Bengal and the presiding deity of Bardhaman. She is worshipped at the Sarvamangala Temple in the Purba Bardhaman district. According to many, the navel of the goddess fell at this place. Therefore, many refer to the temple as a Shakti Peetha.

== Legend ==
It is said that about three and a half centuries ago, in the northern part of the town of Bardhaman, the Bagdis discovered a stone idol while fishing in a pond in the Bahira Sarvamangala Para area. Mistaking it for a piece of stone, they used to crush snails and shellfish on it. At that time, shells were being collected for a lime kiln near the Damodar River, and the stone idol was accidentally taken to the kiln along with the shells. Even though the idol was burned along with the shells, it suffered no damage. That night, after receiving a divine message in a dream, Maharaja Sangam Roy of Bardhaman brought the idol and began worshipping it under the name Sarvamangala. Later, in 1702, Maharajadhiraj Kirti Chand Mahtab built the Sarvamangala Temple, decorated with exquisite terracotta art.

Gradually, around the main temple, structures like the Nat Mandir were built, along with two Shiva temples named Rameshwar and Baneshwar, made of white stone. Three more Shiva temples named Mitreshwar, Chandreshwar, and Indreshwar were made of Soapstone.

== Worship ==
To maintain the daily worship and continuity of the Sarvamangala Temple, the last prince of the royal family, Udaychand Mahtab, formed a trust committee. The worship of this goddess is over three and a half centuries old. The Sharad Utsav in Purba Bardhaman is formally initiated with the establishment of the pot (ghat) of Sarvamangala. A huge procession of devotees flows in with musical instruments. The goddess Sarvamangala, through her water-filled ghat, travels various routes in a horse-drawn carriage. As the procession reaches the Sarvamangala Temple, accompanied by musical instruments, conch shells, bells, cymbals, and ululation, the ghat of Durga Puja is established.

== Temple ==
The Sarvamangala Temple of Bardhaman is the first Navaratna temple of undivided Bengal. This ancient temple is a sacred pilgrimage site for the people of Bardhaman.

== Idol ==
The idol of Goddess Sarvamangala is made of soapstone, with eighteen arms, riding a lion, in the form of Mahishasuramardini, representing Mahalakshmi.
