= Tiar =

Regions with significant populations
- India

Languages
- • Hindi Bengali

Religion
- • Hinduism 100% •

Related ethnic groups
- • Kewat • Mallaah

The Tiar are found in North India. They are also known as the Parihar.

== History and origin ==
The word tiar is a corruption of the Sanskrit word thivara, which means a hunter. They were traditionally hunters, but with the greater deforestation of their environment, they are now mainly farmers and fishermen. The Tiar in Bihar are found in the districts of Purnea, Bhagalpur, and Munger, and in some districts of West Bengal and Jharkhand. A small number are also found in eastern Uttar Pradesh. According to some traditions, they are a sub-group of the Kewat community.

== Present circumstances ==
The Tiar have seven sub-divisions, the Rajbansi, Surajbansi, Polwar, Malhasuraiya, Kewat, Muriary and Bin. Among these clans, there is a sharp stratification and the Muriary and Bins are looked down upon. Like other Hindu communities, they maintain gotra exogamy. The Tiar are now landless, and most are agricultural labourers. They are Hindu, but have their own tribal deity Raja Bhim Sen Salis. The Tiar speak Bhojpuri and most now understand Hindi.

The Tiar in Uttar Pradesh are confined to the Ballia Division, although at one time they extended as far west as Sultanpur District. They were said to the rulers of this region until they were overthrown by the Bachgoti Rajputs. The Tiar are now mainly small cultivators, and speak the Awadhi dialect.

== See also ==
- Tilli
