= Bhagyakul Roy family =

Bangladeshi family

The Bhagyakul Roy family (also known as The Bhagyakul Roys) is a family Zamindars from Bhagyakul in the Munshiganj District of Bangladesh.

== Overview ==
In the first half of the 18th century the Bhagyakul Roy family of the mechantile Tili caste, entered into the salt business. They rapidly acquired vast fortunes and became chief landlords (or zamindars) of Bhagyakul and many other estates in the undivided Bengal (pre-1947). Simultaneously, zamindari estates spread out over the undivided Bengal and Bihar.

The family did not stick to the feudalistic zamindari system, instead they established an inland water and stream navigation services with shipping dockyards. The Bhagyakul Roy's also founded one of the biggest jute mills called M/S. Prem Chand Jute Mills Ltd, and the United Industrial Bank. Though originally 'Kundu,' they were awarded the title of Roy Bahadur to Sri Gunendra Krishna Roy, one of the family members and the rest with 'Roy/Raychowdhary' by the British colonial government. The family now uses its surname as Ray / Roy. A few family members were also honoured with the title of 'Raja' by the British government.

Later the family diversified into steamships, banking, real estate, and manufacturing industries. Many in the family entered public life, developed professional careers, and created institutions of social importance that collectively constitute a significant influence on the Bengali society even today.

The family was instrumental in setting up the East Bengal Club in August 1920. It is also known that the family provided Pandit Ishwar Chandra Vidyasagar with a loan to start the Vidyasagar College.

During the colonial period, the family contributed towards the freedom struggle by actively participating in the Sixth Indian National Congress session (Tivoli Garden, Calcutta, December 1890) and opposing the partition of Bengal.

== Prominent descendants ==
- Justice Kiran Lal Roy, Judge, Kolkata High Court
- Pankaj Roy, Indian cricketer and India test captain
- Ambar Roy, Indian cricketer
- Subrata Roy, Indian industrialist and business man

Tins - zonal level cricketer
