= Sudhamoy Pramanick =

Indian advocate and social activist (1884–1974)

- Born: 11 September 1884; Shantipur
- Died: 2 October 1974 (aged 90); Calcutta
- Spouse: Swarnabala Pramanick
- Children: 10, including Diptendu Pramanick

Sudhamoy Pramanick (September 1884 – October 1974) was an Indian advocate from Shantipur. He was the lifetime secretary of the Tili Samaj, a societal benefit organisation. He was a social activist - member of the executive committee of the Indian National Congress and involved with the Satyagraha movement to campaign for Indian independence.

== Early life, education and career ==
Sudhamoy was the eldest of ten siblings born to the Bengali Tili Pramanik family in 1884 in Shantipur, Nadia. He did his early schooling in Shantipur and went on to the Presidency College, Calcutta to acquire his degree in science in the early 1900s. Later he obtained a degree in law from the University of Calcutta and practised in Raiganj and the Sealdah courts as an advocate. He was elected as one of the Commissioners of Shantipur Municipality in December 1913 and remained in this position till August 1915.

He was literarily inclined. Being well versed in Sanskrit and influenced by the Müllerian wave of exploring the ancient Indian language, he translated and edited papers on Sanskrit literature. As a secretary of the Tili Samaj he was vociferous against social evils like the Pon protha (Dowry) in the Bangiya Tili Samaj Patrika.

In his presidency days he met many nationalists. In 1919, he was a member of the 'moderate' Indian National Liberation Foundation led by Surendranath Bannerjee - one of the founders of the Indian National Congress; but who left the Congress, since he favoured accommodation and dialogue with the British. He went on to support the Congress and joined as a senior leader during his tenure at the Raigunj Court. When the Civil disobedience broke out in the 1930, Sudhamoy took an active role as a Congress member from Raigunj. Raigunj celebrated Independence day (Purna Swaraj) on 26 January 1930 against the British Raj - he and Umeshchandra Bhowmik were the Congress leaders enacting the historic Lahore resolution of the CWC. In March 1930, as mass disobedience gathered momentum in Bengal, several Congress leaders (including Netaji - then Bengal Provincial Congress Committee President), were arrested. On 15 April, on the occasion of the Bengali New Year, Sudhamoy presided over public meetings in Raigunj as a part of the Civil Disobedience Movement in blatant violation of the Salt Laws. Braving arrests by the British, volunteers from all over the district, including women, paraded the streets of Raigunj.

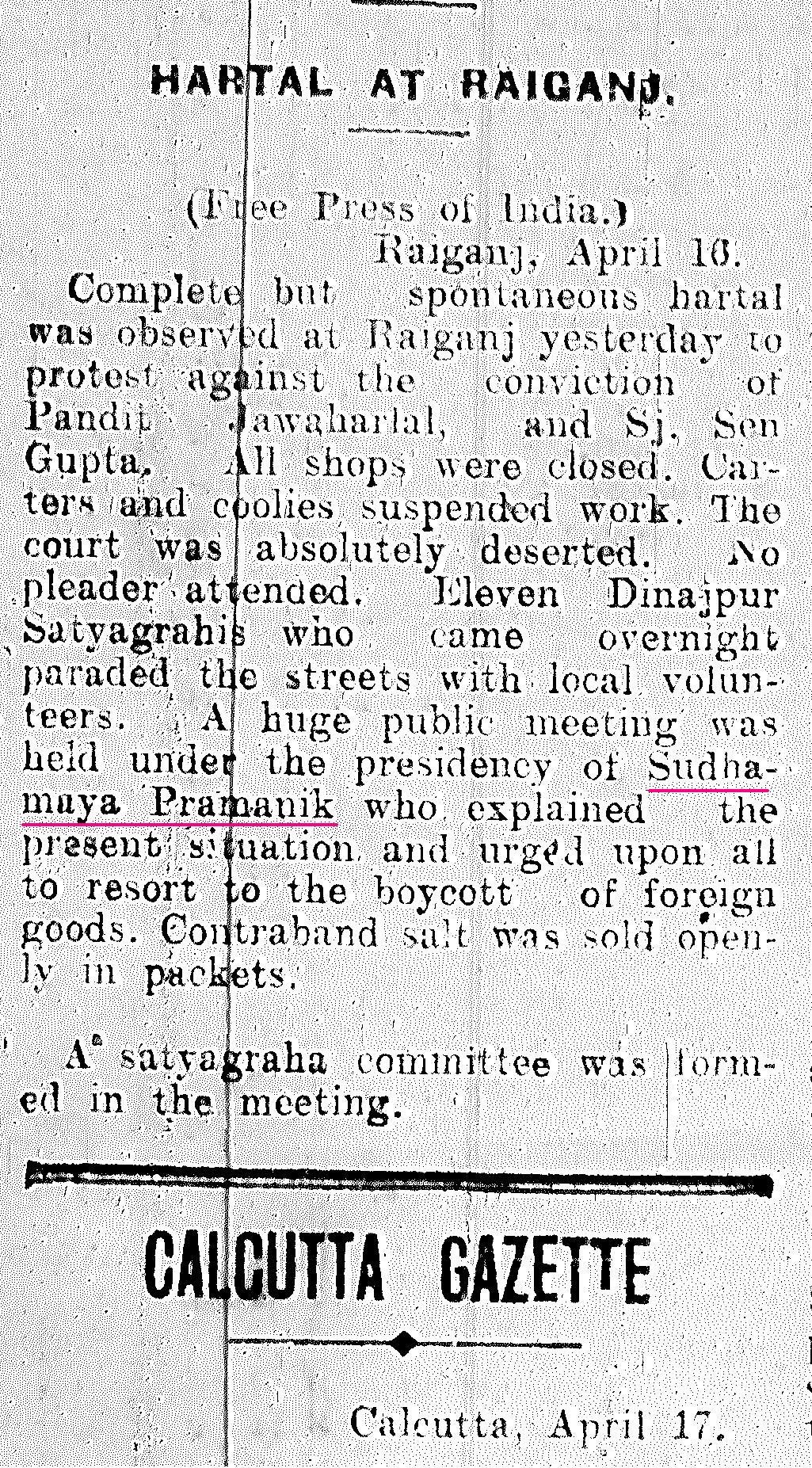
Article from Newspaper Amrita Bazar Patrika, Apr 1930

Few years later he moved to Calcutta. With Pramanick's eldest sons completing their education, he started devoting more time in Sealdah Civil Court - fighting to free many an activist - at times risking his career. He was also known for helping poor students.

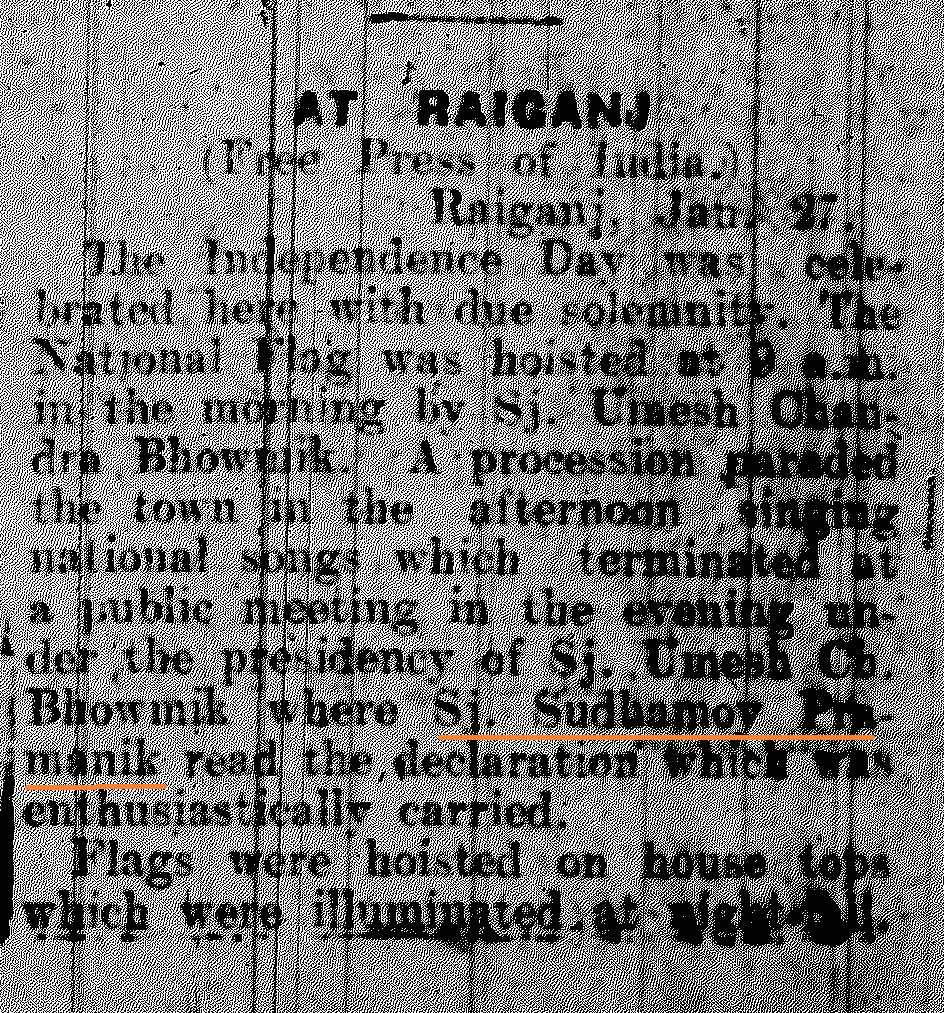
Article from Amrita Bazar Patrika, Jan 1930

== The Pramanick family ==
Gobindo Chandra	Radharani
Sudhamoy Pramanick	Swarnabala
Diptendu Pramanick	Niyoti	Nabendu	Suprabha	Subhendu	Anita	Sabita	Nikhilendu	Asita ...
Subrata	Gouri
Sougata Pramanick	Aditi
Sharmila	Oindrila
