= Diptendu Pramanick =

Indian film personality (1910–1989)

- Pramanick in the 1940s
- Born: 18 July 1910; Calcutta (now Kolkata), West Bengal, India
- Died: 15 December 1989 (aged 79); Kolkata, West Bengal, India
- Years active: 1931–1976
- Children: 2
- Father: Sudhamoy Pramanick

Diptendu Pramanick (18 July 1910 –15 December 1989) was an Indian film personality from Kolkata (then Calcutta), India. He was the founder secretary of the Eastern India Motion Pictures Association, a fraternity of film personnel which is an interface between the entertainment industry of eastern India and the Government. During his multifarious career he came in contact with eminent personalities and saw the evolution of this organisation from its initial days to being a regionwide entity.

== Early life and education ==
He was born on 18 July 1910 in Calcutta. He was the eldest son of Sudhamoy Pramanick from Shantipur. He did his early schooling in Calcutta and then at the Raiganj Coronation School, Raiganj where his father practised as a lawyer.

In 1926 he returned to Calcutta and cleared Matriculation followed by the Intermediate examinations in Science in 1928. He then joined the Scottish Church College, Calcutta.

His interactions with many independence activists (due to his father's involvement with the Congress and the Satyagraha movement at Raigunj), and the inspiration from Subhas Chandra Bose, an alumnus of the Scottish Church College, (the Oaten Affair – Bose assaulted Prof Oaten due to the latter's derogatory comment on Indians ) probably drove him to antagonise an Indian-loathing teacher at Scottish Church College, and follow Bose's suit.

He later graduated from Asutosh College, and earned a bachelor's degree in science from the University of Calcutta in 1931.

== Career ==
1931–1948

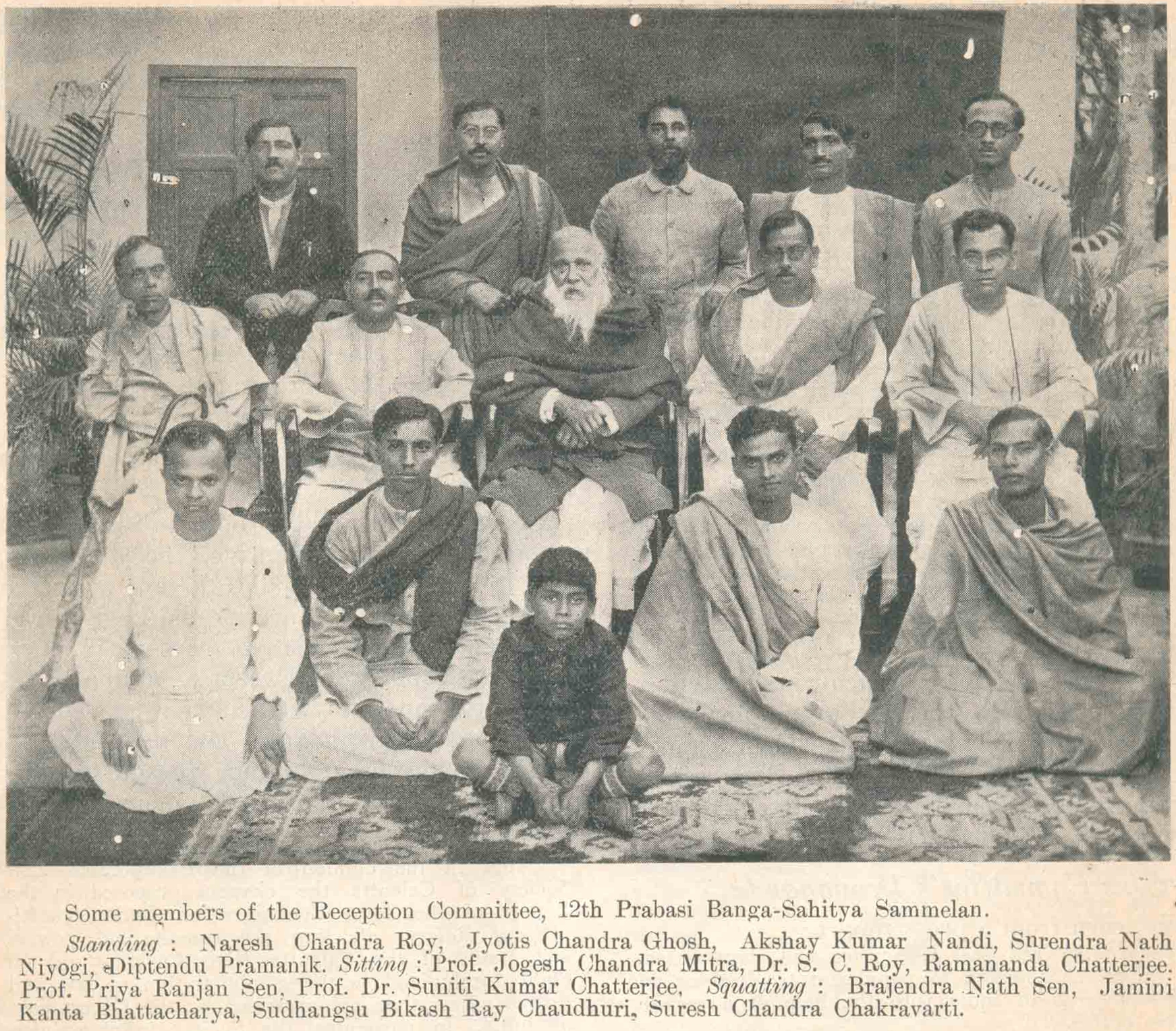
Diptendu Pramanick in the reception committee of the 12th Prabasi Banga Sahitya Sammelan, Calcutta, in December 1934 (standing fifth from left)

After leaving college, he worked as the Secretary to the then Mayor of Calcutta Santosh Kumar Basu. Out of his literary inclinations, he associated with literary conferences and Bengali literature fora. The 12th Prabasi Banga-Sahitya Sammelan was inaugurated by Rabindranath Tagore in Calcutta, December 1934 (Photo : The Reception Committee was chaired by Ramananda Chatterjee)..Also seen in the photograph is Akshay Kumar Nandi, father of Amala Sankar.

On completion of Mr Basu's term as Mayor, he became the Liaison Officer of Civil Defense and in the Publicity Section of the Commercial Museum. In 1942, he moved to the Home Department of the then Bengal Government as Liaison Officer, Civil Defense. The concept of Civil Defence owes its origin to erstwhile ARP Organisation raised and operated during World War II (1939–45) to safeguard the life and property of the civilian population and train the citizens to handle war time crisis.

At this time, Japan had overrun Burma and the threat of bombing was looming large on Calcutta. Eventually Japanese aircraft bombed Budge Budge (south of Calcutta). A Bengali folk rhyme captures this World War II event:

Sa-re-ga-ma-pa-dha-ni	[Do re me fa so la ti]
Bom(b) phelechhe Japani,	the Japanese have dropped a bomb
Bomer modhye keute shap	There is a cobra in the bombs
British bole bapre-bap.	The British shout, (in awe and fear)

The bombing led to widespread panic – over a million people fled from the city and there was a huge pressure on civic authorities to control the situation. Indian Civil Defence Department expanded at a rapid pace to counter these threats and planned lighting restrictions, medical platoons, fire-fighting and rescue units. At the end of the war, the department was wound down starting 1947.

Subsequently, he tested his skills of entrepreneurship through a venture (Cine Furnishers Limited) with a couple of friends . It is here that he came in close contact with people of the Bengali film industry of Kolkata.

Diptendu Pramanick

EIMPA

Enthused with these contacts, he joined an association of producers, distributors and exhibitors of Bengal (Bengal Motion Pictures Association) in 1948 as Secretary while Sri B. N. Sircar was the President. Next year he started the BMPA journal and was the editor for more than two decades. The Association was working on a rented premises at 125, Dharamtolla Street (now Lenin Sarani) which was moved to 2, Madan Street, Calcutta. The association grew under his leadership and moved into 98E Chowringhee Square (now 98E B.N. Sircar Sarani – EIMPA house - its present location).

He was the first secretary of the then expanded Eastern India Motion Picture Association (EIMPA) and was instrumental in opening the EIMPA offices in Patna and Guwahati. In this period the uncertainties of war led to severe shortage of raw film stock in the country. A Film Advisory Committee was formed under the Government of India, and was given control of raw film stock distribution. EIMPA played an important role as a trade representative, negotiating materials for the film industry of eastern India and much of Diptendu's efforts were directed for the same. During his tenure he also served as the Secretary of Film Federation of India (1953–1954). In 1956, Diptendu and other stalwarts like Satyajit Ray, Robert Hawkins, Vijaya Mulay and Dasgupta revived the Calcutta Film Society which witnessed the joining of 300 members.

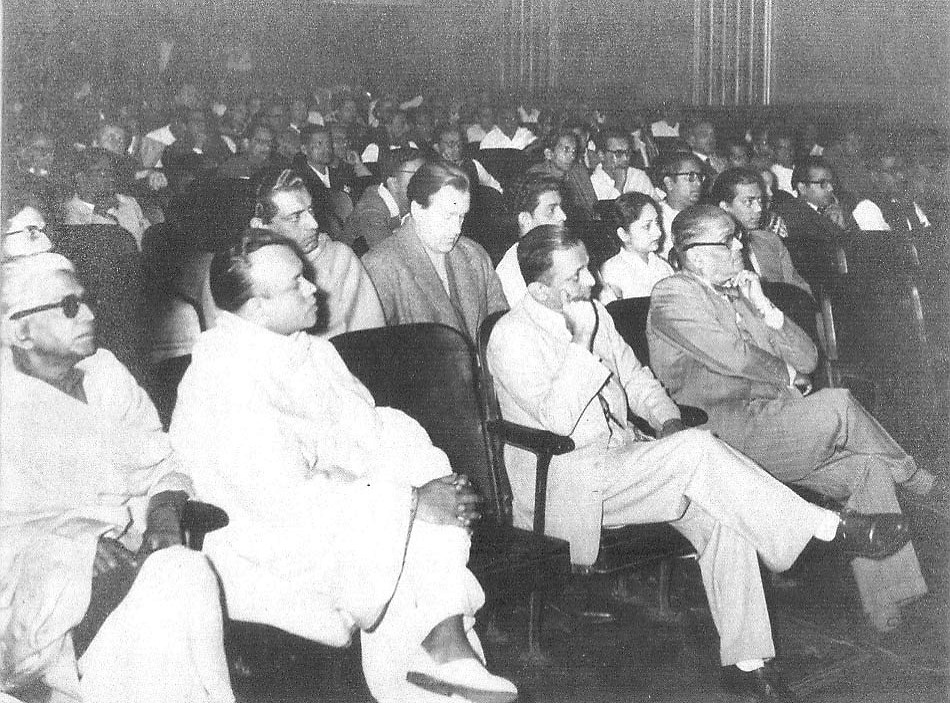
Diptendu seated left in 4th row at CFS 1956 meeting, Robert and Satyajit in 2nd row

The same team were then the prime movers behind the formation of the Federation of Film Societies of India (FFSI) in 1959 which was presided by Satyajit Ray, with Diptendu as the Jt. Treasurer during which Indira Gandhi was a member of the FFSI (till 1964).

=== First International Film Festival of India (IFFI), 1952 ===
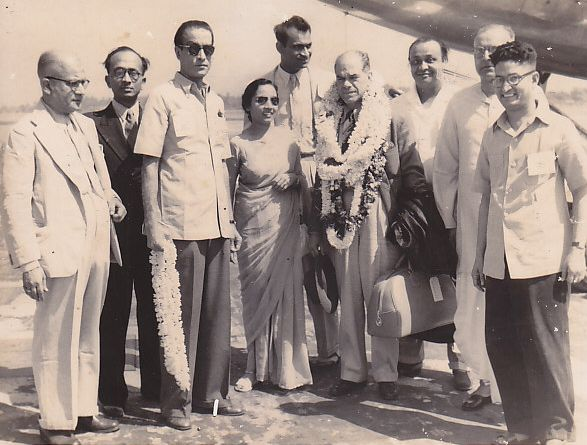
With Frank Capra in 1952, Diptendu Pramanick - 2nd from left

The Films Division of the Government of India sponsored and organised the First International Film Festival of India in 1952. BMPA played a pivotal role in organising the festival in Calcutta. Frank Capra, the famous American director flew in and was overwhelmed by the reception he got at Calcutta after visiting Bombay and Delhi. In his autobiography he wrote

.. Was deluged with garlands ... Bengali people are quite different from the rest of India. They are like the Irish, emotional, sentimental. All riots and revolutions start in Bengal. I can understand it. It took me an hour to leave the airport, what with the crowds and the photographers...

— The name above the title - an Autobiography

This photograph depicts his welcoming at the Dum Dum Airport as in his autobiography, with the who's who of Calcutta Filmdom.

=== First film seminar, 1955 ===
Sangeet Natak Akademi convened the first film seminar at Delhi and it was inaugurated by Prime Minister Pandit Jawaharlal Nehru. Prominent film personality attended this seminar

Invitation to meet the President - Dr Rajendra Prasad at his residence

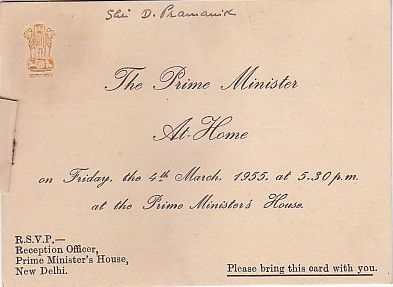
Invitation from the Prime Minister, Pandit Nehru to meet at his residence

=== Nepal visit ===
On June 29, 1969, a high-level delegation led by Diptendu from EIMPA, touched down at Kathmandu Airport, marking a pivotal moment in Indo-Nepal cultural relations.

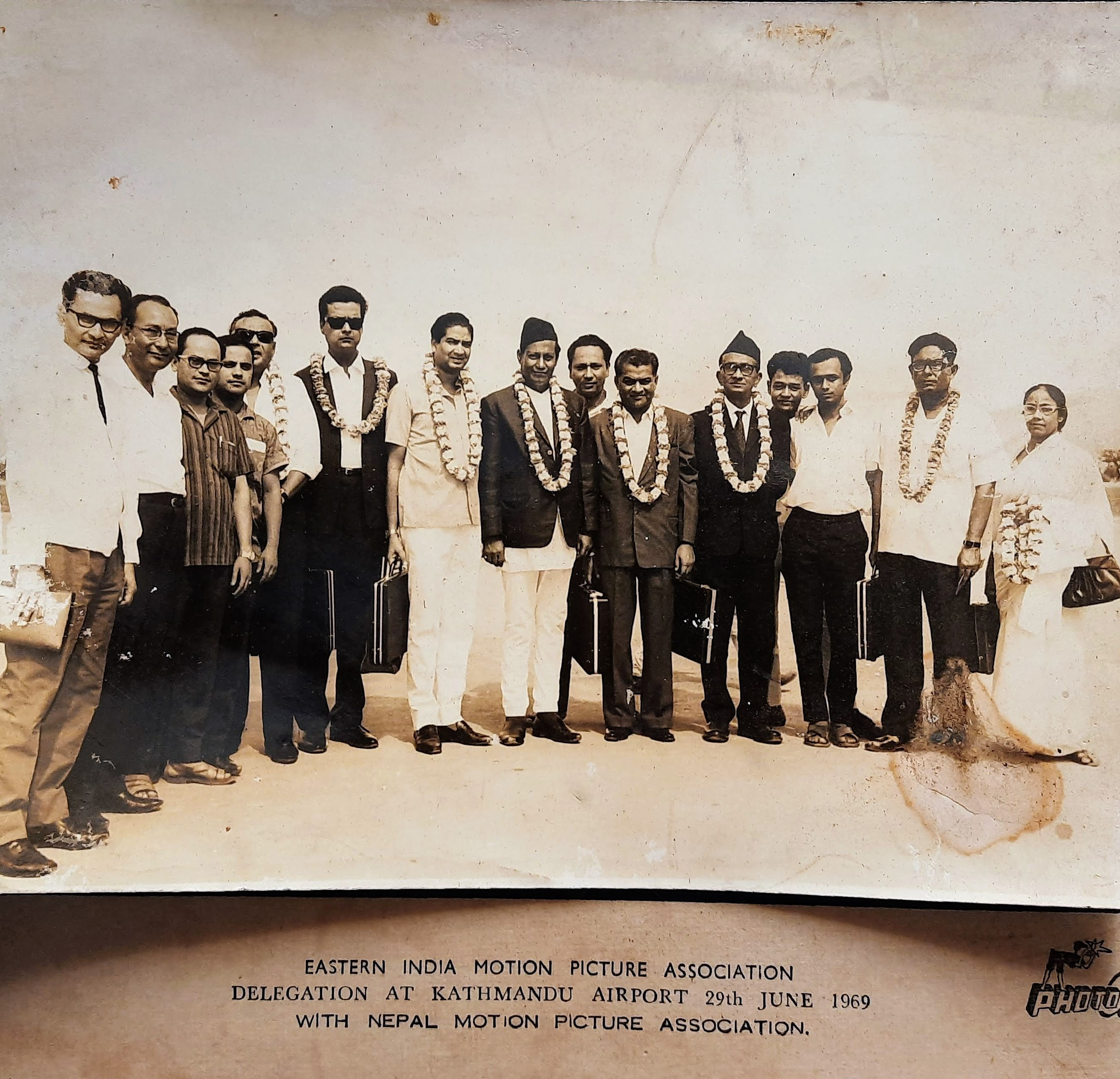
Diptendu at Nepal, 1969

The visit was a collaborative effort with the Nepal Motion Picture Association and was instrumental in discussing film distribution, technical exchange, and the screening of Indian films in Nepal — a foundation that continues to support the industry today.

=== Twilight years ===
In the early 1970s, he was still getting nominated to committees, representing the Cinema trade for their infrastructural and legal issues, including the significant 1967–68 and the 1973–74 Parliamentary Estimates Committee.

The elaborate reports of the 1968 and 1973 Committees raised issues about institutional finances, cess based state funding of cinema, creating a generation of ‘low-budget’ stars to counter the lopsided economics of a star-heavy industry and censorship reforms. In that sense the report anticipated the birth of a generation of stars from the state-driven FTII in the Naseeruddin Shah and Smita Patil era.

== The Pramanick family ==
Gobindo Chandra	Radharani
Sudhamoy Pramanick	Swarnabala
Diptendu Pramanick	Niyoti	Nabendu	Suprabha	Subhendu	Anita	Sabita	Nikhilendu	Asita ...
Subrata	Gouri
Sougata Pramanick	Aditi
Sharmila	Oindrila

== Legacy ==
Children from many underprivileged families of Dahuka, a remote village in Bardhaman district, receive school books from the Diptendu Pramanick Book fund every year, during a ceremony held on the occasion of the Saraswati Puja. The apex body of film distributors and producers (EIMPA) continues to help the industry facing the challenges of corporatisation, censorship, piracy and "multiplexes".
