= Tili (caste) =

Hindu mercantile caste, found in some part of the state Bihar and West Bengal

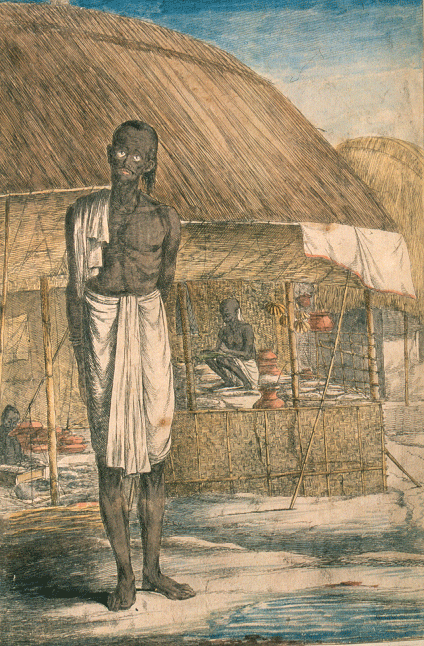
- Tili Shopkeeper, from a 1799 book

Regions with significant populations
- • India
- Bihar: 17,579 (0.0134% of the population of Bihar)

Religion
- Hinduism

Tili is a Bengali Hindu middle-ranking caste, found in the state of Bihar and West Bengal in India. By the late nineteenth century Tili was one of the fourteen castes belonging to 'Nabasakh' group in Bengal.

== History and origin ==
The Tili caste belongs to West Bengal and Bihar. Tilis speak in Angika and Bengali. Tilis are now found mainly in Bhagalpur and Banka District of Bihar, and also in Bankura, Hooghly and Midnapore districts of West Bengal. According to Ramkrishna Mukherjee, some Bengali Telis are gradually converting their caste to Tili.

By the second half of the nineteenth century, Tili became a symbol of higher status among the Telis. Trade and cultivation were the occupations of the dissident Telis or Tilis in the sixteenth century as testified by Chandimangalkavya. In south-western Bengal, the Tilis appeared to have become cocoon bearers and traders. In the nineteenth century, the Tilis had become one of the foremost mercantile communities of Bengal. The Roys of Bhagyakul, the Nandis of Cossimbazar (Murshidabad), the Kundu Chowdhuris of Mahiari (Howrah), Pal Chowdhuris of Ranaghat gained affluence through trade and moneylendling, and became landholders. The Pal Chaudhuris of Ranaghat (Nadia) ran indigo factories. (Note: The early Pal Chaudhuri were Tambuli by caste (a market gardening caste involved in both agriculture and trade), were traders in salt and crops within the zamindari of Maharaja Krishna Chandra of Nadia, the premier Hindu magnate of Bengal at the time of Clive and Hastings.) The Dey family of Srerampore rose to prominence by saltpeter trade. Dayaram Roy, initially a diwan, acquired large estate and founded the Dighapatia Raj, partly by his unjust stewardship. The Pramaniks of Shantipur also gained fame for their temple building activities. Tilis became a major beneficiary of the economic changes made by the British government and British commercial interests who had converted Bengal into a vast market ready to supply raw materials to England.

== Social status ==
Tili was included in the list of 177 "backward classes" for the state of West Bengal by Mandal Commission, but the state government has not yet recognised them as such, and they still belong to General category.

== Notable people ==
- Krishna Kanta Nandi, the banian to Warren Hastings and the founder of the Cossimbazar Raj family.
- Sudhamoy Pramanick, Bengali advocate and Congress activist.
- Diptendu Pramanick, Bengali film personality.
- Pankaj Roy, Indian cricketer and Padma Shri awardee, member of Bhagyakul Roy family.
- Subrata Roy, founder-chairman of Sahara India Pariwar, a prominent business conglomerate in India.
- Maharani Swarnamoyee, Maharani of Cossimbazar Raj from 1844 to 1897 and a philanthropist during the period of Bengal Renaissance.
- Gostha Behari Pal, the first captain of the India National Football Team.
- Kristo Das Pal, an Indian journalist, orator and the editor of the Hindoo Patriot.
- Dinendra Kumar Roy, a Bengali novelist and editor.
- Harinath Majumdar, a Bengali journalist, poet, writer, and Baul singer.
- Rasik Krishna Mallick, an Indian journalist, editor, reformer, educationist and a leading member of Young Bengal group.
- Bipradas Pal Chowdhury, a Bengali industrialist and landlord.
