= Krishna Kanta Nandi =

Krishna Kanta Nandi, also known as Kanta Babu, was a banian/commercial agent to Warren Hastings and Sir Francis Sykes, 1st Baronet; and made a fortune working for the East India Company and trading silk. He is the founder of the Cossimbazar Raj based in Cossimbazar.

== Early life ==
Nandi was born around 1700 in a wealthy Tili family of Burdwan District. He received a formal education and was an expert and astute businessman.

== Career ==
Nandi was a trader who traded in cotton, salt, and silk. Nandi met Warren Hastings in 1750 when they were supposedly of the same age. He saved Hastings life when he was imprisoned by the Nawab of Bengal Siraj ud-Daulah by helping him escape prison. From 1754 to 1756, he served as a banian to Warren Hastings. He had loaned money to Hastings and had a good relationship with him. After Hastings left India, Nadi was hired by Francis Sykes on Hastings's recommendation.

Nandi acquired Pargana Baharbund. Nandi, and other revenue agents of East India company, such as Akrur Dutta, Pritoram Marh, Baranashi Ghosh, Ganga Govind Singh, Gokul Ghoshal, Hidaram Banerjee, Manshur Mukherjee, and Nabakrishna Deb, made a significant fortune working for the company. While Gokul Ghoshal went after properties in sparsely populated areas Nandi preferred densely populated areas such as Murshidabad.

Nandi expanded further through buying estates under the Permanent Settlement in Bengal. He had acquired properties across northern and western Bengal. Hastings seized the estate of Rani Bhabani and handed it over to Nandi. He built the Kasimbazer Rajbari which had marbles from Baneras. The marbles were gained by Hastings in his expedition against Maharaja Chait Singh in which Nandi accompanied him. Maharaja Nandakumar had bought allegations of corruption against Hastings and Nandi.

== Death ==
Nandi died in 1794/1804 (dates differ) and was succeeded by his son, Loknath Nandi who later received the title of Maharaja from the Nawab of Murshidabad. The book Life and times of Cantoo Baboo (Krishna Kanta Nandy), the banian of Warren Hastings was written about his life in 1804.

== See also ==
- Manindra Chandra Nandi-descendant
