= Uday Chand Mahtab =

Indian zamindar (1905–1984)

Sir Uday Chand Mahtab KCIE

Member of the Bengal Legislative Assembly
- In office 1946–1947
- Preceded by: Bijoy Prasad Singh Roy
- Constituency: Burdwan Landholders

Member of the Bengal Legislative Assembly
- In office 1937–1945
- Succeeded by: Kanai Lal Das and Jadabendra Nath Panja
- Constituency: Burdwan Central (General)

Personal details
- Born: 14 July 1905
- Died: 10 October 1984 (aged 79)
- Parent: Bijay Chand Mahtab (father)
- Education: University of Calcutta

Sir Uday Chand Mahtab KCIE the Maharajadhiraja Bahadur of Bardhaman Raj, K.C.I.E., (14 July 1905 – 10 October 1984) was the last ruler of Burdwan Raj, who ruled from 1941 until 1955, when the zamindari system was abolished in India.

== Life ==
He was the eldest son of Bijay Chand Mahtab.

He did his graduation from Presidency College, Calcutta and Calcutta University.

During the regency of his father he served as Dewan-i-Raj for several years and succeeded to the throne of Burdwan Raj after the death of his father.

During British Raj, he headed and was a member of several committees like, member of the Damodar Canal Enquiry Committee 1938, Select Committee on Calcutta Municipal (amendment) Bill 1940; Chairman of Burdwan District Flood Relief and Bengal Central Flood Relief Committees 1943–44; Chairman of Indian Red Cross Appeal (Bengal) 1943-1946 and of Calcutta War Committee 1943-1946 and of Damodar Flood Central Enquiry Committee 1944; Member of Bengal Tanks Improvement Bill Select Committee 1944 and of Advisory Committee on Terrorist Convicts in Bengal 1944; Member of West Bengal Forest Denudation Enquiry Committee 1944 and of Select Committee on Bengal Agricultural Income Tax Bill 1944; Member of the Indian Constituent Assembly – 1946–1947. He also presided the West Bengal group of Legislators, in 1946, which voted 58:21 in favor of partition of Bengal.

He served as President of the non-Muslim block of the Bengal Partition meeting in 1947 and was a member of the Legislative Assembly of Bengal from years 1937 to 1952. In the first election after independence in 1952, Sir Uday Chand Mahtab lost to a freedom fighter and communist, Benoy Choudhury, in spite of a campaign in his favor by Jawaharlal Nehru. The election defeat was followed by legislation for abolition of the zamindari system in 1954.

After the abolition of the zamindari system in 1955, he shifted from Bardhaman to his family's house at Alipur in Calcutta. Here he became a director of IISCO, and several other leading mercantile firms of the day, such as Dunlop, Metal Box and Brooke Bond. He acceded to the request of the Chief minister of West Bengal, Dr. Bidhan Chandra Roy and handed over his palace, Mahtab Manzil and Golap Bagh to the University of Burdwan.

He donated a piece of land in Bardhaman to the numerous employees of the Raj so that they could build accommodation there. With the end of the Raj, he immersed himself in his commercial and business interests.

He was also a Steward of the Royal Calcutta Turf Club. He instituted a fund for The Maharajadhiraja Uday Chand Mahtab of Burdwan Memorial Cup at Calcutta Race Course.

He died on 10 October 1984 leaving behind three sons and three daughters. The eldest son is Maharajaadhiraja Saday Chand Mahtab of Burdwan. Born on 26 May 1936.

== Titles ==
- Maharajadhiraja Bahadur (hereditary)

== Honours ==
- United Kingdom:
  - – King George V Silver Jubilee Medal-1935.
  - – King George VI Coronation Medal-1937.
- British India:
  - – Knight Commander of the Order of the Indian Empire – 1945.

== Reign ==
Uday Chand Mahtab Kapoor-Mahtab Dynasty Born: 14 July 1905 Died: 10 October 1984
Regnal titles
Preceded by Bijoy Chand Mahtab	Maharajadhiraja of Bardhaman Raj; 1941–1955 (abdicated)	Succeeded by None; Zamindari abolished (Merged within the Republic of India)
