= Sukumar Nandi =

Indian Computer Scientist

- Born: India
- Citizenship: Indian
- Education: (BSc) (B.Tech) (M.Tech); University of Calcutta (PhD); IIT Kharagpur
- Scientific career
- Workplaces: IIT Guwahati

Sukumar Nandi is an Indian computer scientist who is the senior member of IEEE and is a professor in the Department of Computer Science and Engineering at the IIT Guwahati. He did his Ph.D. from IIT Kharagpur under Professor P. Pal Chaudhri. He has got 9000 citations in his academic career. He joined IIT Guwahati, and has been teaching there since 1995. He is also a member of the Board of Governors of IIT Guwahati.

He was appointed the "Dean of Academic Affairs" in IIT Guwahati in 2008, and held the post until 2012. He is now the Deputy Director of IIT Guwahati.

== Education ==
Sukumar Nandi completed his BSc in Physics and his B.Tech in Electrical Engineering (Instrumentation specialisation) and M.Tech in Computer Science And Engineering all from the University of Calcutta. He then completed his PhD in Computer Science from IIT Kharagpur in 1995.
