= Nikhil Bharat Banga Sahitya Sammelan =

Annual literary convention in India

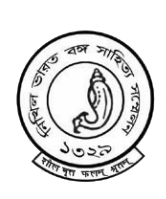
- Formation: 1923
- Type: INGO
- Legal status: Association
- Purpose: Literary exchange
- Headquarters: Mandir Marg, New Delhi, India
- Location: India
- Region served: Global
- Members: by subscription
- Official language: Bengali

Nikhil Bharat Banga Sahitya Sammelan (in Bangla: নিখিল ভারত বঙ্গ সাহিত্য সম্মেলন; All India Bengali Literary Conference) is an annual convention of Bengali literary personages of India, held annually. The first annual conference (then, Prabasi Banga-Sahitya Sammelan)(প্রবাসী বঙ্গ-সাহিত্য সম্মেলন) was held in Banaras at Central Hindu Boys School in 1923 and was presided over by Rabindranath Tagore. People interested in knowing about the details of it conference can get the details from a widely acclaimed book named,'সভাপতির অভিভাষণ: প্রবাসী বঙ্গ সাহিত‍্য সম্মেলন'written by Dr Amarnath Karan(lalmati Prakasani).

The first sponsors were distinguished 'Bengalis living outside Bengal' (Prabasis) like Atul Prasad Sen, Radhakamal Mukherjee, Kedar Nath Bandyopadhyay, Mahendra Chandra Roy et al.

Since 1922 till 1980 the conference has travelled far and wide within India, from major cities like Delhi, Calcutta, Bombay, Madras, Lucknow, Hyderabad to far flung Srinagar and Guwahati.

The 12th convention was held at Kolkata in Dec 1934. Post Independence, in 1953 the coinage 'Prabasi' was dropped and 'Nikhil Bharat' (All India) was adopted in the context of the free nation.

== Objectives of the conference ==
Delegates from all over the country meet to hold thematic discussions, meet Bengali authors, novelists, and poets, attend literary sessions, exchange thoughts with people of other languages, and enjoy cultural evenings.

== Current scope ==
Under the patronization of great Bengali literary personalities like Atul Prasad Sen, Kazi Nazrul Islam and others, the Sammelan has reached maturity, having branches every major city and town of India. Its activity of serving Bengali literature and Bengali culture outside Bengal has spread over almost all the states of India. The central office of the organization is located at Kali Bari, Mandir Marg, New Delhi-110001.

The organisation publishes a regular Bengali journal called 'Sammelani' and various other books related to Bengali literature and culture. It organizes cultural and literary programmes throughout the year. The annual convention is held every year in different parts of the country. The idea is to enrich Bengali literature and its culture by exchanging views and resources with other Indian authors.

== Gallery ==
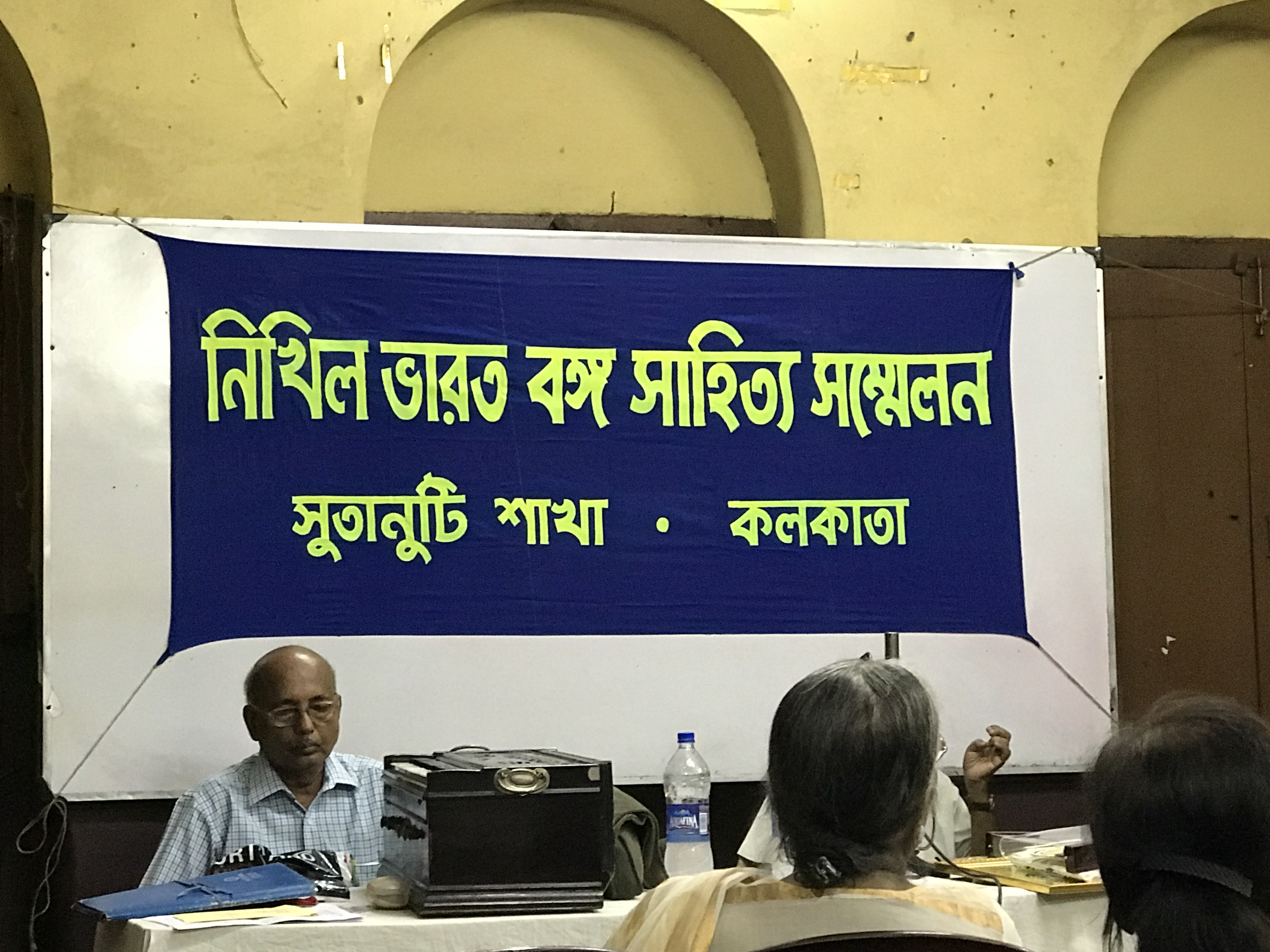

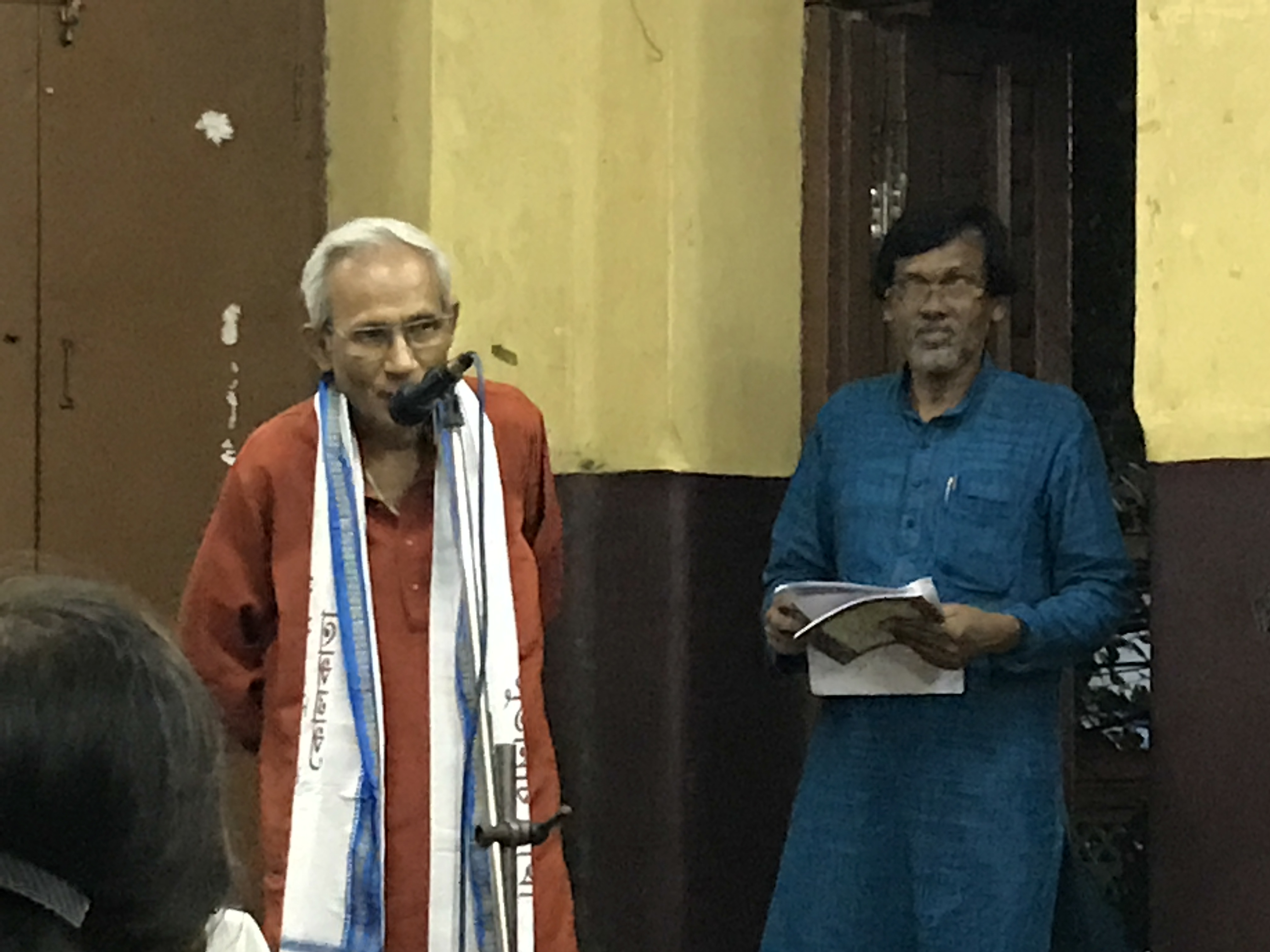

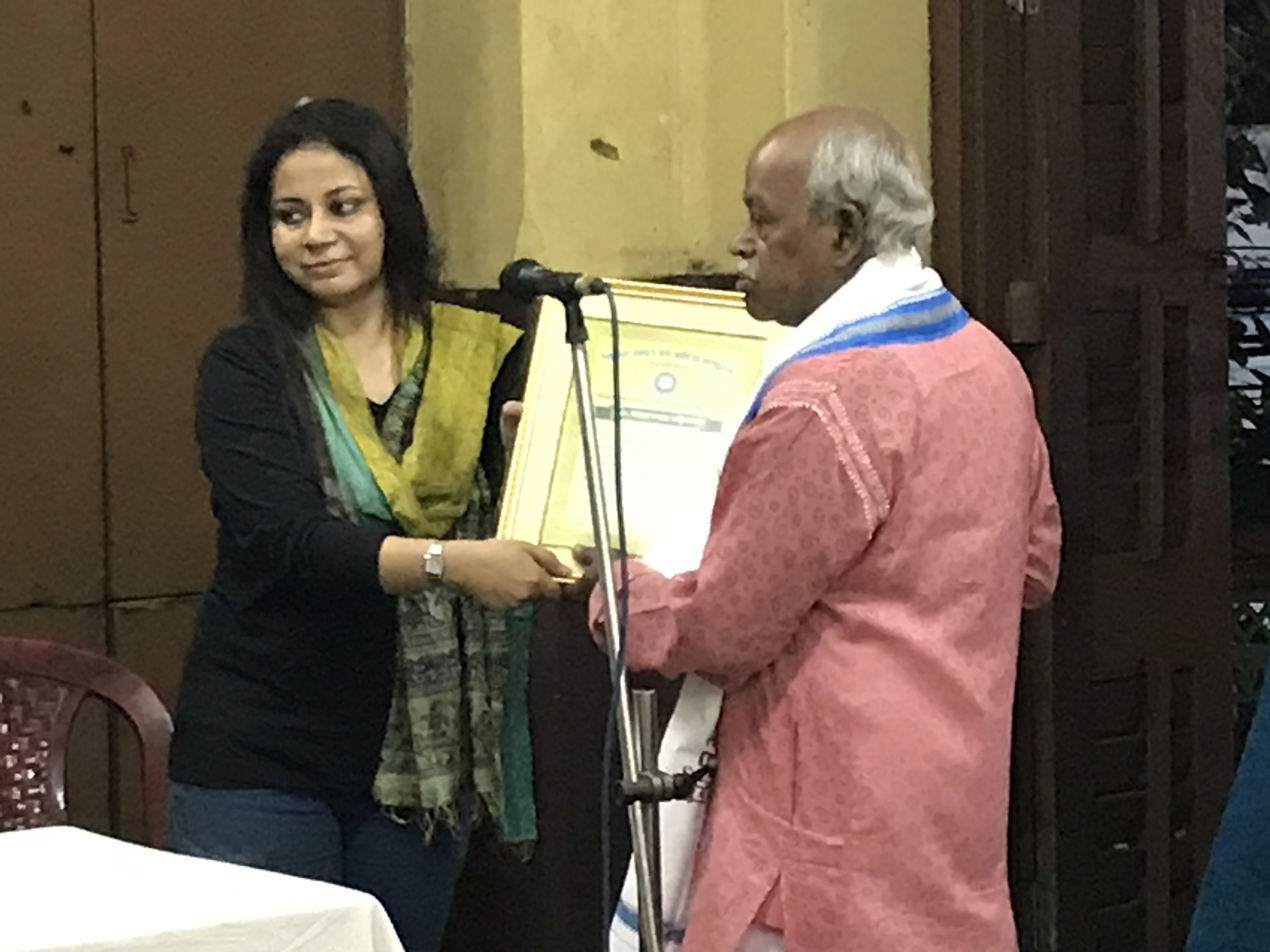

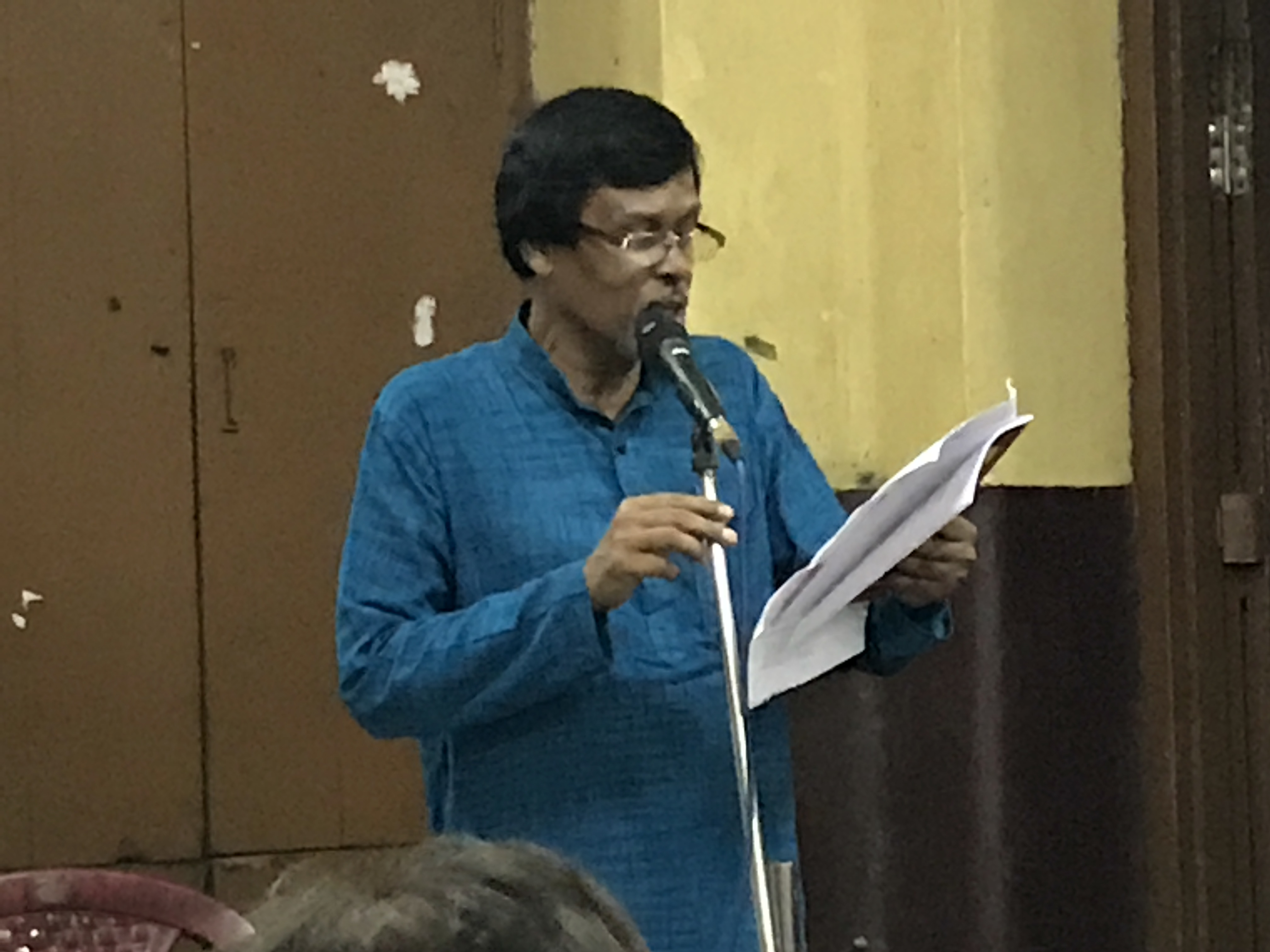

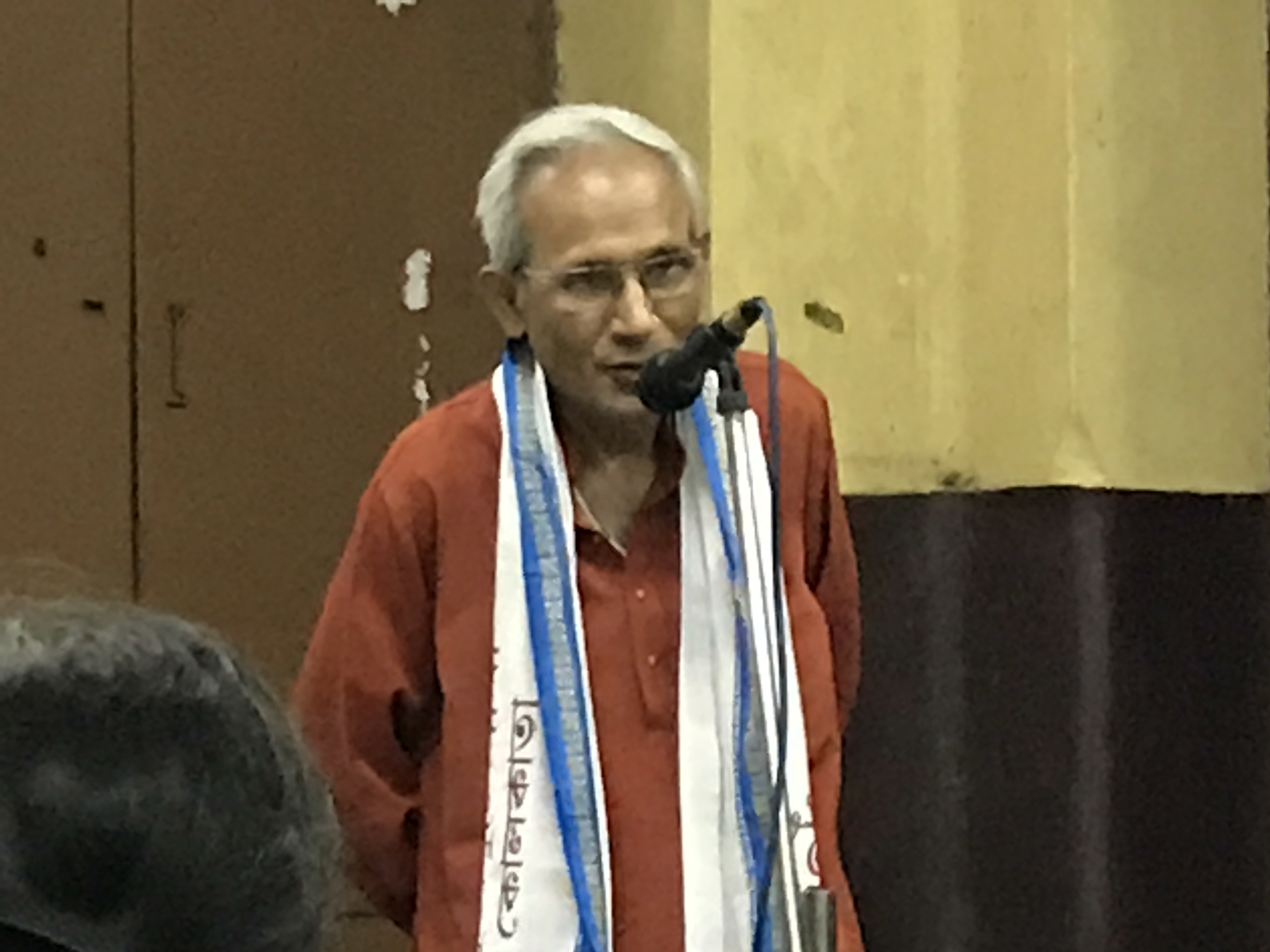

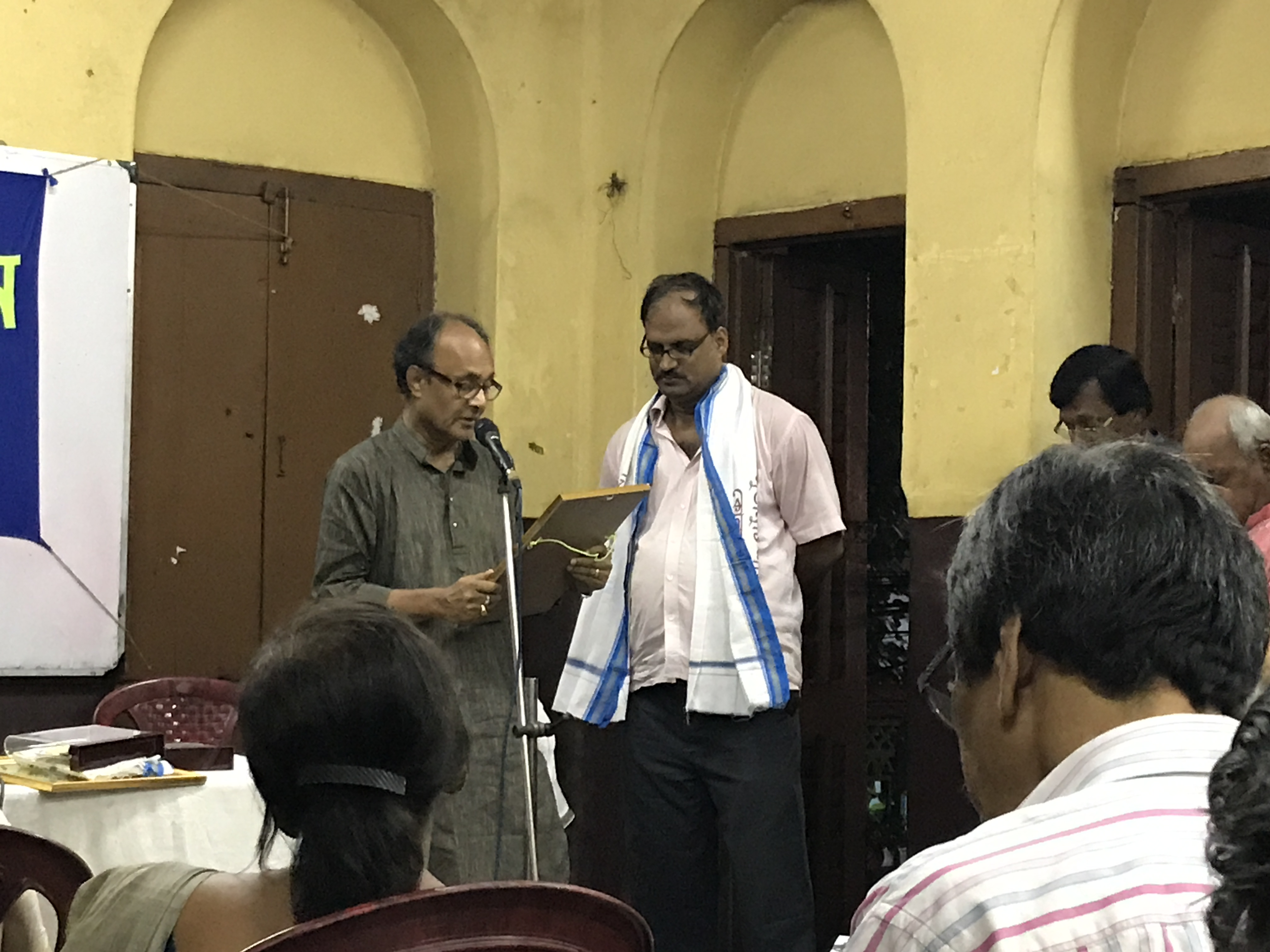

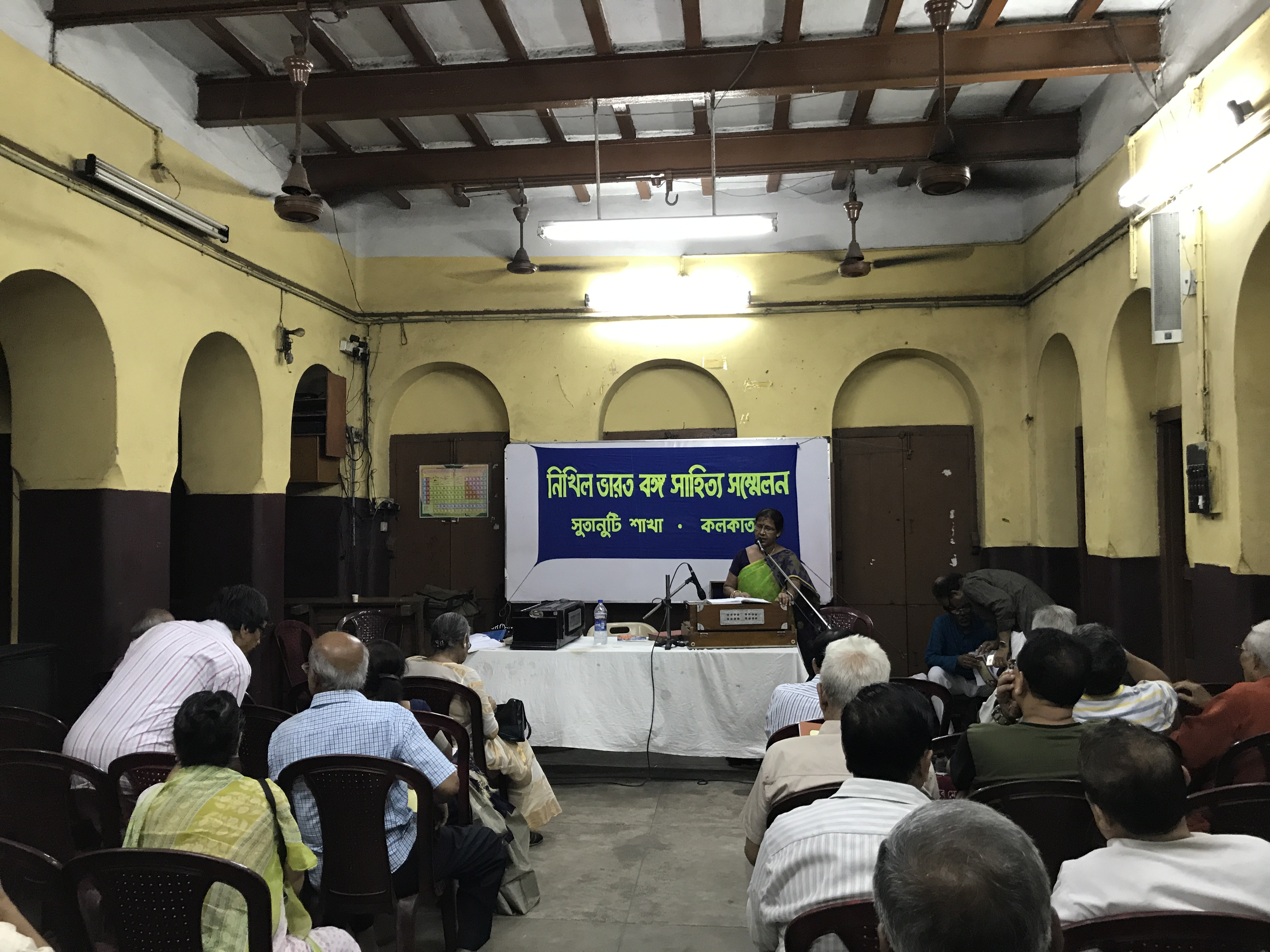

== See also ==
- 12th Prabasi Banga-Sahitya Sammelan held at Calcutta, 1934
