= James Bourdillon =

James Dewar Bourdillon (1811– 21 May 1883), was a British civil servant who worked in the Madras Presidency.

== Life ==
Bourdillon was the second son of the Rev. Thomas Bourdillon, vicar of Fenstanton and Hilton, Huntingdonshire. He was educated at home and then at a school at Ramsgate; having been nominated to an Indian writership, he proceeded to Haileybury College in 1828, and in the following year to Madras. After serving in various subordinate appointments in the provinces, he was appointed secretary to the board of revenue, and eventually in 1854 secretary to government in the departments of revenue and public works. Bourdillon had previously been employed upon an important commission appointed under instructions of the late court of directors to report upon the system of public works in the Madras presidency, his colleagues being F. C. Cotton, C.S.I., of the Madras engineers, and Sir George Balfour, K.C.B., of the Madras artillery. The report of the commission, which was written by Bourdillon, enforces in clear and vigorous language the enormous importance of works of irrigation, and of improved communications for the prevention of famines and the development of the country. The writer's accurate knowledge of details and breadth of view render the report one of the most valuable state papers ever issued by an Indian government.

Bourdillon was also the author of a treatise on the ryotwár system of land revenue, which exposed a considerable amount of prevalent misapprehension as to the principles and practical working of that system. Working in concert with his friend and colleague, Sir Thomas Pycroft, he was instrumental in effecting reforms in the transaction of public business, both in the provinces and at the presidency. He especially helped to improve the method of reporting the proceedings of the local government to the government of India and to the secretary of state, which for some years put Madras at the head of all the Indian governments in respect of the thoroughness with which its business was conducted and placed before the higher authorities.

Bourdillon's health failed in 1861, and he was compelled to leave India, and to retire from the public service at a time when the reputation which he had achieved would in all probability have secured his advancement to one of the highest posts in the Indian service. To the last he devoted much time and attention to Indian questions, occasionally contributing to the Calcutta Review, and interesting himself among other matters in the questions of provincial finance and of the Indian currency. He revised for Colonel J. T. Smith, R.E., all his later pamphlets on a gold currency for India. He died suddenly at Tunbridge Wells on 21 May 1883.
