= Bardhaman =

City in West Bengal, India

Bardhaman Burdwan
- City
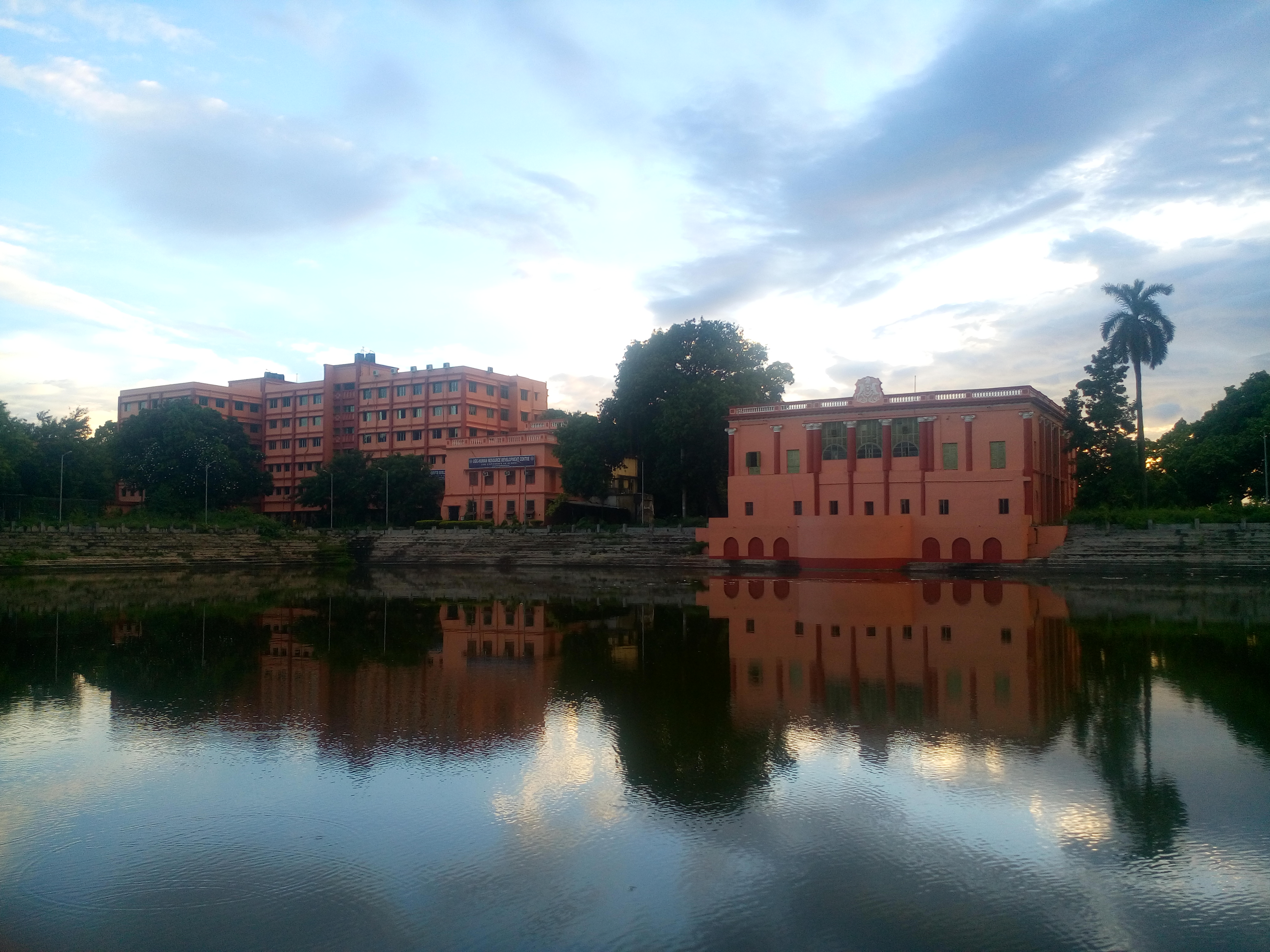
- 108 Shiva Temple Sarbamangala Temple Nawab Bari Curzon Gate Meghnad Saha Planetarium University of Burdwan
- Nickname: Royal Heritage City of West Bengal
- Location within West Bengal Location within India Location within Asia
- Coordinates: 23°14′N 87°52′E
- Country: India
- State: West Bengal
- Division: Burdwan division
- District: Purba Bardhaman
- Subdivision: Bardhaman South; Bardhaman North
- Established: 1865

Government
  - Type: Municipality
  - Body: Bardhaman Municipality
  - Chairman: Paresh Chandra Sarkar (TMC)

Area
  - City: 26.30 km^{2} (10.15 sq mi)
  - Metro: 157.62 km^{2} (60.86 sq mi)
- Elevation: 30 m (98 ft)

Population (2011)
  - City: 347,016
  - Density: 13,190/km^{2} (34,170/sq mi)
  - Metro: 407,000

Languages
  - Official: Bengali
  - Additional official: English
- Time zone: UTC+5:30 (IST)
- PIN: 713101, 713102, 713103, 713104 713141,713149.
- Telephone code: +91-342
- Vehicle registration: WB-41, WB-42
- Website: burdwanmunicipality.gov.in

Bardhaman (/ˈbɔːrdəˌmɑːn/, Bengali: [ˈbɔrˌd̪ʱo.man]), officially Bardhaman Sadar, is a city and municipality located on the northern bank of the Damodar river in the state of West Bengal, India. It is the headquarters of Purba Bardhaman district, having become a district capital during the period of British rule. Burdwan, an alternative name for the city, has remained in use since then.

== Etymology ==
The history of Burdwan is known from about 5000 BC (the Mesolithic or Late Stone Age). The origin of this name dates back to the sixth century BCE and is ascribed to Vardhamāna or Mahāvīra (599-527 BCE), the 24th Tīrthāṅkara of Jainism, who spent some time in Astikagrama, according to the Jain scripture of Kalpa Sūtra. This place was renamed as Vardhamana in his honour.

== History ==
The city owes its historical importance to being the headquarters of the Maharajas of Burdwan, the premier noblemen of lower Bengal, whose rent-roll was upwards of 300,000. Bardhaman Raj was founded in 1657 by Sangam Rai, of a Hindu Khatri family of Kotli in Lahore, Punjab, whose descendants served in turn the Mughal Emperors and the British government. The East Indian Railway from Howrah was opened in 1855. The great prosperity of the raj was due to the excellent management of Maharaja Mahtab Chand (died 1879), whose loyalty to the government especially during the "Hul" (Santhal rebellion) of 1855-56 and the Indian rebellion of 1857 was rewarded with the grant of a coat of arms in 1868 and the right to a personal salute of 13 guns in 1877. Maharaja Bijaychand Mahtab (born 1881), who succeeded his adoptive father in 1888, earned great distinction by the courage with which he risked his life to save that of Sir Andrew Fraser, the lieutenant-governor of Bengal, on the occasion of the attempt to assassinate him made by freedom fighters of Bengal on 7 November 1908.

Mahtab Chand Bahadur and later Bijoy Chand Mahtab worked towards making the region culturally, economically and ecologically healthier. The chief educational institution was the Burdwan Raj College, which was entirely supported out of the maharaja's estate. Sadhak Kamalakanta as composer of devotional songs and Kashiram Das as a poet and translator of the Mahabharata were products of such an endeavour. Pratap Chandra Roy was the publisher of the first translation in the world to translate Mahabharata in English (1883–1896). The society at large also continued to gain the fruits. Among others, the poet Kazi Nazrul Islam and U. N. Brahmachari were from the area. Batukeshwar Dutt an Indian revolutionary and independence fighter in the early 1900s was born on 18 November 1910 in a village Oari in Burdwan district. He is known for having exploded a few bombs, along with Bhagat Singh, in the Central Legislative Assembly in New Delhi on 8 April 1929. The city became an important centre of North-Indian classical music as well.

== Geography ==
Bardhaman
R: temple, mosque, P: park, F: facility, C: university, college, museum, H: historical site
Owing to space constraints in the small map, the actual locations in a larger map may vary slightly

=== Location ===
The region has an average elevation of 40 metres (131 ft). The city is situated 1100 km from New Delhi and a little less than 100 km north-west of Kolkata on the Grand Trunk Road (National Highway 19) and Eastern Railway. The chief rivers are the Damodar and the Banka.

The first epigraphic reference to the name of this place occurs in a sixth-century AD copper plate found in Mallasarul village under Galsi Police Station. Archeological evidences suggest that this region, forming a major part of Radh Bengal, could be traced even back to 4000 BCE.

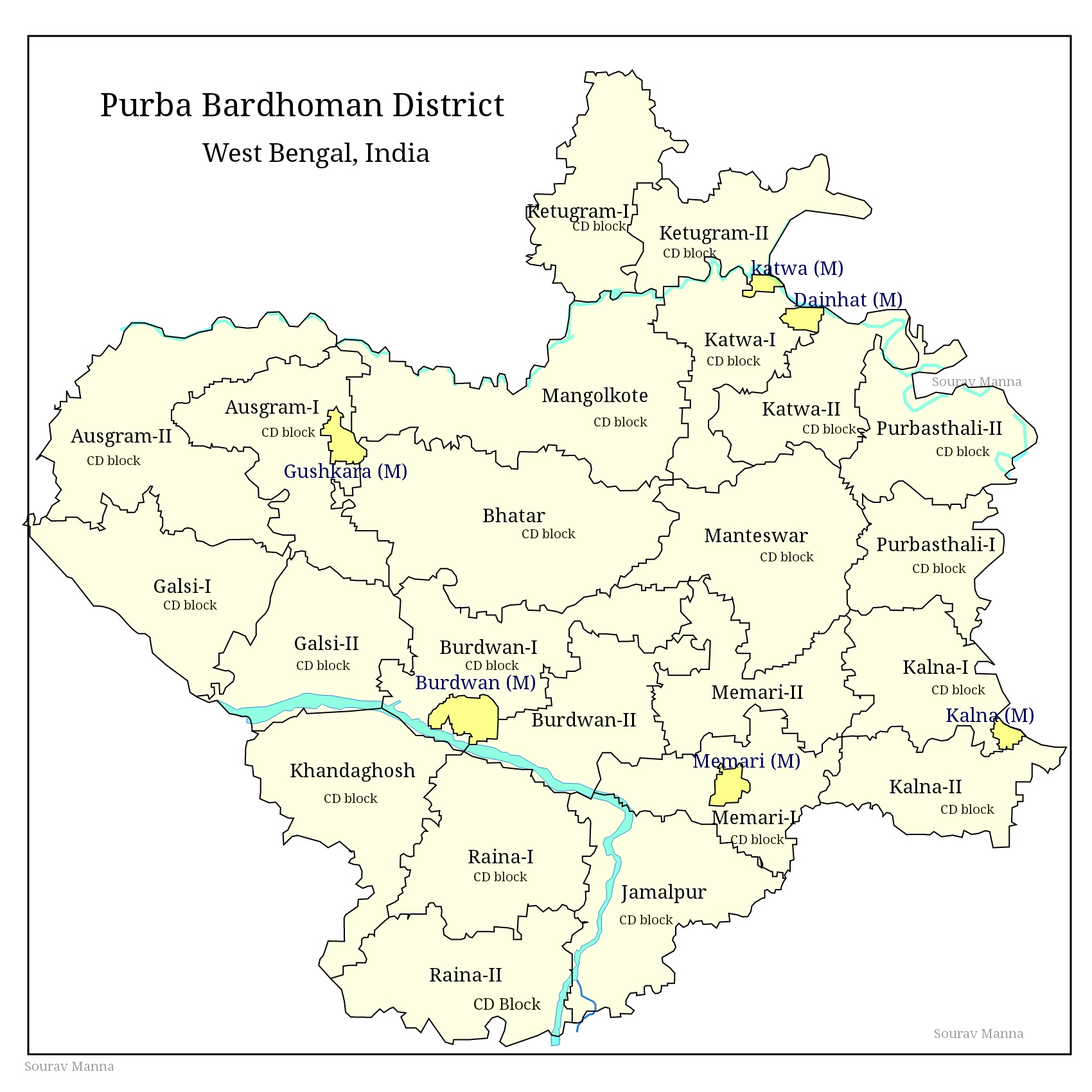
Map of purba bardhaman district

=== Climate ===
The Köppen Climate Classification sub-type for this climate is "Aw" (tropical savanna climate).

Climate data for Bardhaman (1991–2020)
Month	Jan	Feb	Mar	Apr	May	Jun	Jul	Aug	Sep	Oct	Nov	Dec	Year
Record high °C (°F)	36.6 (97.9)	38.8 (101.8)	40.4 (104.7)	46.0 (114.8)	46.5 (115.7)	45.2 (113.4)	39.8 (103.6)	37.2 (99.0)	38.0 (100.4)	36.0 (96.8)	35.0 (95.0)	33.0 (91.4)	46.5 (115.7)
Mean daily maximum °C (°F)	25.3 (77.5)	29.4 (84.9)	33.4 (92.1)	36.6 (97.9)	36.6 (97.9)	35.4 (95.7)	33.0 (91.4)	32.8 (91.0)	32.6 (90.7)	32.2 (90.0)	30.3 (86.5)	26.9 (80.4)	32.3 (90.1)
Mean daily minimum °C (°F)	11.9 (53.4)	16.4 (61.5)	20.3 (68.5)	24.5 (76.1)	25.6 (78.1)	26.2 (79.2)	25.9 (78.6)	25.6 (78.1)	25.0 (77.0)	23.3 (73.9)	17.9 (64.2)	13.6 (56.5)	21.7 (71.1)
Record low °C (°F)	4.4 (39.9)	5.9 (42.6)	11.7 (53.1)	14.6 (58.3)	15.4 (59.7)	18.6 (65.5)	19.4 (66.9)	17.0 (62.6)	16.0 (60.8)	15.4 (59.7)	9.8 (49.6)	4.4 (39.9)	4.4 (39.9)
Average rainfall mm (inches)	9.3 (0.37)	21.7 (0.85)	29.2 (1.15)	60.2 (2.37)	93.3 (3.67)	216.7 (8.53)	312.1 (12.29)	265.7 (10.46)	221.0 (8.70)	117.0 (4.61)	9.8 (0.39)	6.3 (0.25)	1,362.4 (53.64)
Average rainy days	0.8	1.7	2.2	3.1	5.8	10.3	15.1	13.9	11.2	5.8	0.8	0.6	71.2
Average relative humidity (%) (at 17:30 IST)	61	62	59	62	65	73	81	80	81	78	67	61	70
Source: India Meteorological Department

== Demographics ==
Historical population
Year	Pop.	±%
1951	76,000	—
1961	109,000	+43.4%
1971	144,000	+32.1%
1981	170,000	+18.1%
1991	246,000	+44.7%
2001	287,000	+16.7%
2011	347,016	+20.9%

Religion in Bardhaman
Religion	Percent
Hinduism	83.42%
Islam	14.88%
Not stated	1.19%
Christianity	0.19%
Others	0.32%

In the 2011 census, Bardhaman Urban Agglomeration had a population of 347,016, out of which 177,055 were males and 169,961 were females. 25,069 people were between the ages of 0–6 years. Effective literacy rate for the 7+ population was 88.62%.

Languages spoken in Bardhaman city (2011)
1. Bengali (87.0%)
2. Hindi (11.5%)
3. Santali (0.57%)
4. Urdu (0.36%)
5. Punjabi (0.18%)
6. Others (0.30%)

== Government and politics ==
=== Civic administration ===
In 1865, the Municipality of Burdwan came into being with 39,818 people living in the 12.8 square kilometer municipal area at that time. The Municipality has a population of 2,85,602 and an area of 26.30 square kilometers, according to the 2001 census. The municipality now has 35 wards. The district's major town and civil station is Burdwan. The Municipality is governed by the Bengal Municipal Act of 1932 which was framed to provide for municipal governance in the Bengal Presidency which was amended several times in the post-independence era and remained in force till 1992 until finally the West Bengal Municipal Act 1993 replaced it. The Chairman of the Burdwan Municipality is Paresh Chandra Sarkar who serves as the administrative head.

=== Police stations ===
Burdwan police station has jurisdiction over Bardhaman municipal area and Burdwan I and Burdwan II CD Blocks. The area covered is 192.15 km^{2}. There are out posts at Barabazar, Muradpur, Keshabganj, Nutanganj and Birhata.

Women police station Burdwan has jurisdiction over Bardhaman municipal area and Burdwan I and Burdwan II CD Blocks. The area covered is 192.15 km^{2}.

== Economy ==
Bardhaman town's economy has traditionally been based on agriculture, naming it the "Rice Bowl of West Bengal" and "Granary of Bengal." It is one of the state's largest agricultural centers, owing to its location in a productive agricultural region. The town hosts a variety of agro-based enterprises that process agricultural produce creating local jobs. Burdwan also serves as a key commercial hub, delivering agricultural commodities and raw materials to neighbouring regions while boosting its rural hinterland. With its strong agricultural basis, industrial connections, and trading network, the town has the potential to grow into a agricultural market (Mandi) center. The town has shifted from an agricultural economy to a diverse industrial and service hub. Agro-based businesses like rice and oil mills, as well as small-scale sectors like weaving, ceramics, and metalwork, contribute to economic growth. As the administrative center of the Purba Bardhaman district, the town promotes trade, commerce, and government. It has grown as an educational and healthcare hub, drawing students, professionals, and immigrants. Expanding real estate, retail, hotel, and transportation infrastructure, including enhanced road and rail connectivity, has boosted economic potential. The expanding industrial and service sectors have increased urbanisation while decreasing reliance on agriculture.

== Cityscape ==
=== Culture ===
Bardhaman has a multi-cultural heritage. The deuls (temples of rekha type) found here are reminiscent of Bengali Hindu architecture. The old temples bear signs of ancient Hinduism, mostly belonging to the Sakta and Vaishnava followers. The Kankaleswari Kali is also located in the city of Bardhaman. Bardhaman experienced and survived numerous violent conflicts, due to Mughal, Pashtun and Maratha invaders. The city of Bardhaman was visited by notables of the Delhi Sultanate from Raja Todarmal to Daud Karrani, from Sher Afghan Khan and Kutub-ud-din to Ajimuswan to the future Mughal emperor Shah Jahan while he was still a rebel. Bardhaman also has a number of Bengali Christians, and although they are a minority, there are many churches in the city.

=== Foods ===
- Sitabhog and Mihidana are two famous sweets of Bardhaman, introduced first in honour of the Raj family.

== Transport ==
=== Road ===
- The Grand Trunk Road runs across the city; NH 19 (old numbering NH 2) bypasses the city. South Bengal State Transport Corporation (SBSTC) and private operators operate buses from Arambag, Asansol, Baharampur, Bankura, Bolpur, Esplanade, Kirnahar, Purulia, Saltlake and Tarakeswar. It takes around 2–2.5 hours. Bardhaman is well connected by bus with numerous places all around. Most of the buses arrive and leave from Alisha Bus Stand and Nababhat Bus Stand. Burdwan also has a facility of bus service known as Town Service which connects different areas within the city.
- Sadarghat Road also connects Bardhaman with Bankura (indirectly) and Hooghly (directly) district.
- There is a flyover reducing traffic in station area starting from Mehedi Bagan. This flyover connects G. T. Road and Kalna-Katwa Road.

==== Rickshaws ====
- Cycle rickshaws and E-Rickshaws (Toto) are available for travel within the city. Very few autos run too.
- Also available mini bus within city and surrounding. Intracity connector by SBSTC under JNNURM project has been provided.
- Rapido's bike and Toto service is also active in the city.

=== Rail ===
- The main Howrah-Delhi rail track passes through Bardhaman, and the city is served by Bardhaman railway station. The Howrah Rajdhani Express (via Patna) has a scheduled stop at Bardhaman. One can take a Howrah–Barddhaman chord line local train from Howrah to reach Bardhaman in two hrs. One can also travel along the Sahibganj Loop, which branches off, one station after Bardhaman. The narrow gauge line to Katwa was upgraded to broad gauge in 2013, up to Balgona, which has been extended to Katwa. It is well connected to major cities like Kolkata, Ranchi, Patna, Durgapur, Asansol, Siliguri, Dhanbad.

=== Air ===
The closest domestic airport that serves the city is Kazi Nazrul Islam Airport. The airport is located in Andal. It is roughly 75 kilometres (47 mi) from the Nababhaat City Bus Terminus.

The nearest international airport is Netaji Subhas Chandra Bose International Airport at Dum Dum in Kolkata which is 97 kilometres (60 mi) away.

== Education ==
=== University ===
The University of Burdwan was formally inaugurated on 15 June 1960 by Sukumar Sen, its first Vice-chancellor. It was after the abolition of the Zamindari system in the fifties that Uday Chand Mahtab, the last representative of the Burdwan Raj, left his entire property in Burdwan to the state government. This, coupled with the initiative of the then Chief Minister of West Bengal, Bidhan Chandra Roy, facilitated the establishment of this university. Presently, the administrative works are mostly done at the Rajbati (the palace of Barddhamana Maharaja) campus; on the other hand, academic activities centre on the Golapbag campus. With social responsibilities in mind, the university actively patronised the construction of a science centre and the Meghnad Saha Planetarium.

=== Colleges ===
- Burdwan Dental College and Hospital
- Burdwan Homoeopathic Medical College & Hospital
- Burdwan Medical College
- Burdwan Raj College
- St. Xavier's College, Burdwan
- University Institute of Technology, Burdwan University
- Vivekananda Mahavidyalaya

=== Schools ===
- Burdwan Municipal High School - established in 1883 by Debendranath Tagore
- St. Xaviers School - CISCE

== Places of interest ==
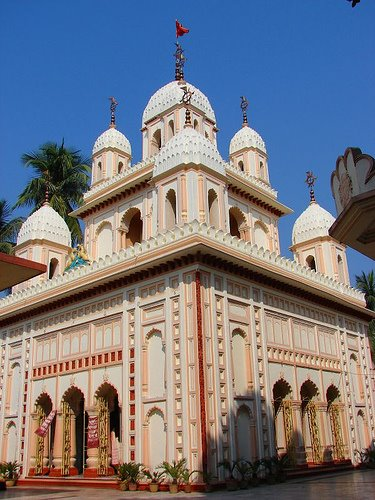
Sarbamangala Temple

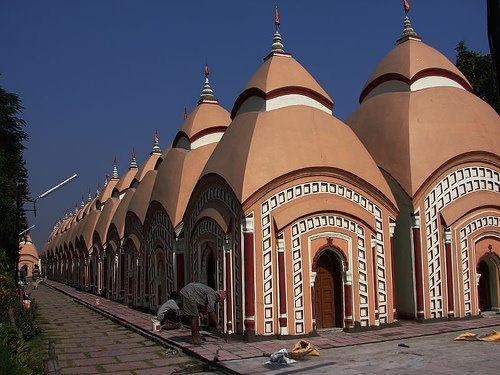
108 Shiva Temple

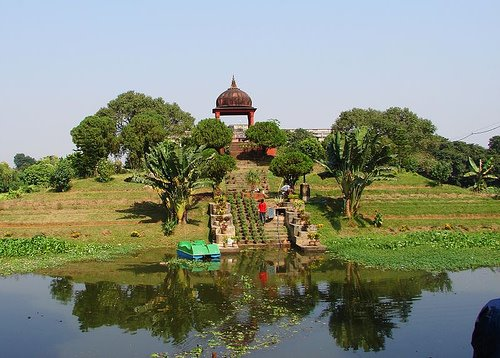
Hawa Mahal (Golapbag)

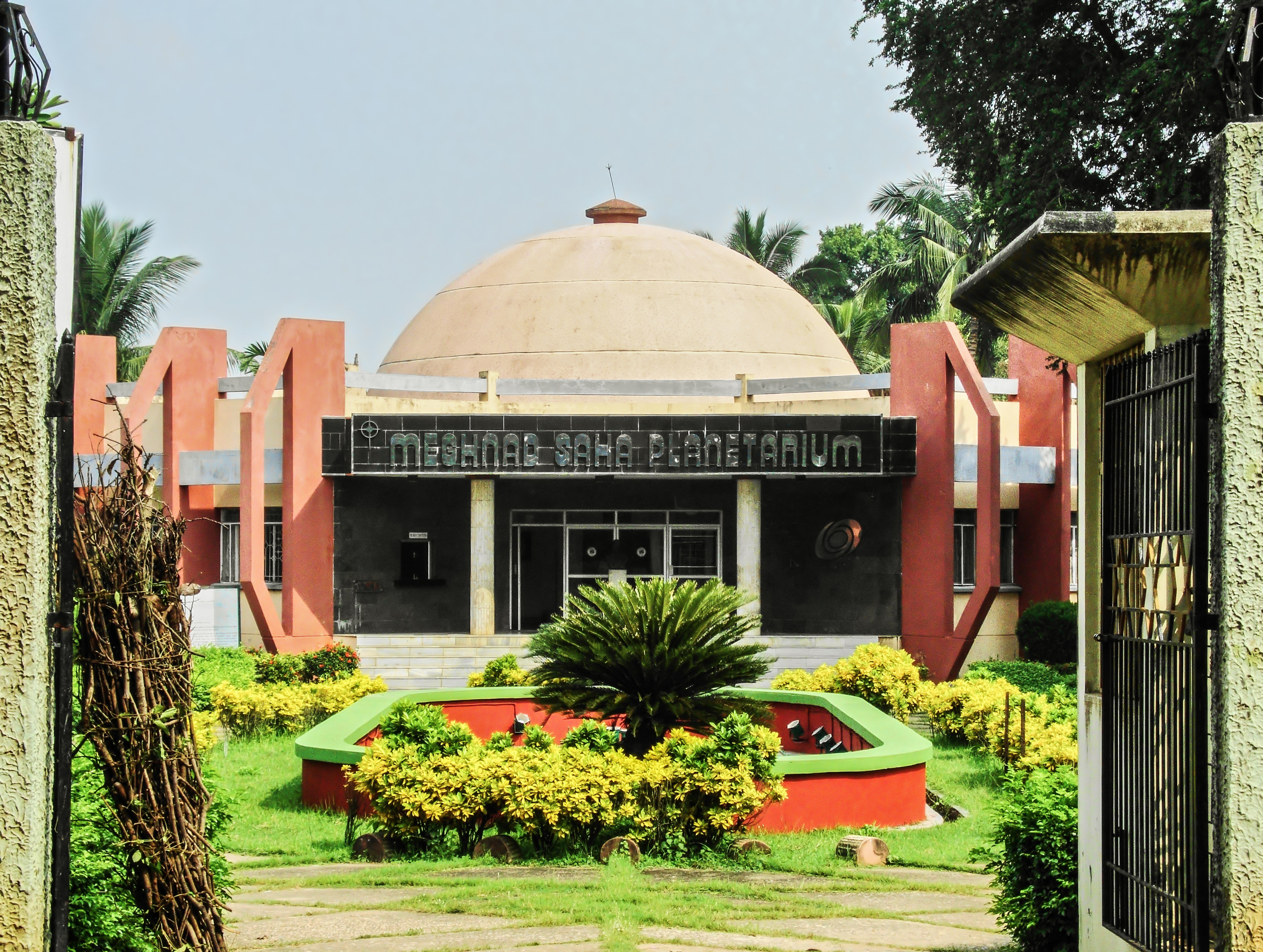
Meghnad Saha Planetarium, Golapbag, Bardhaman

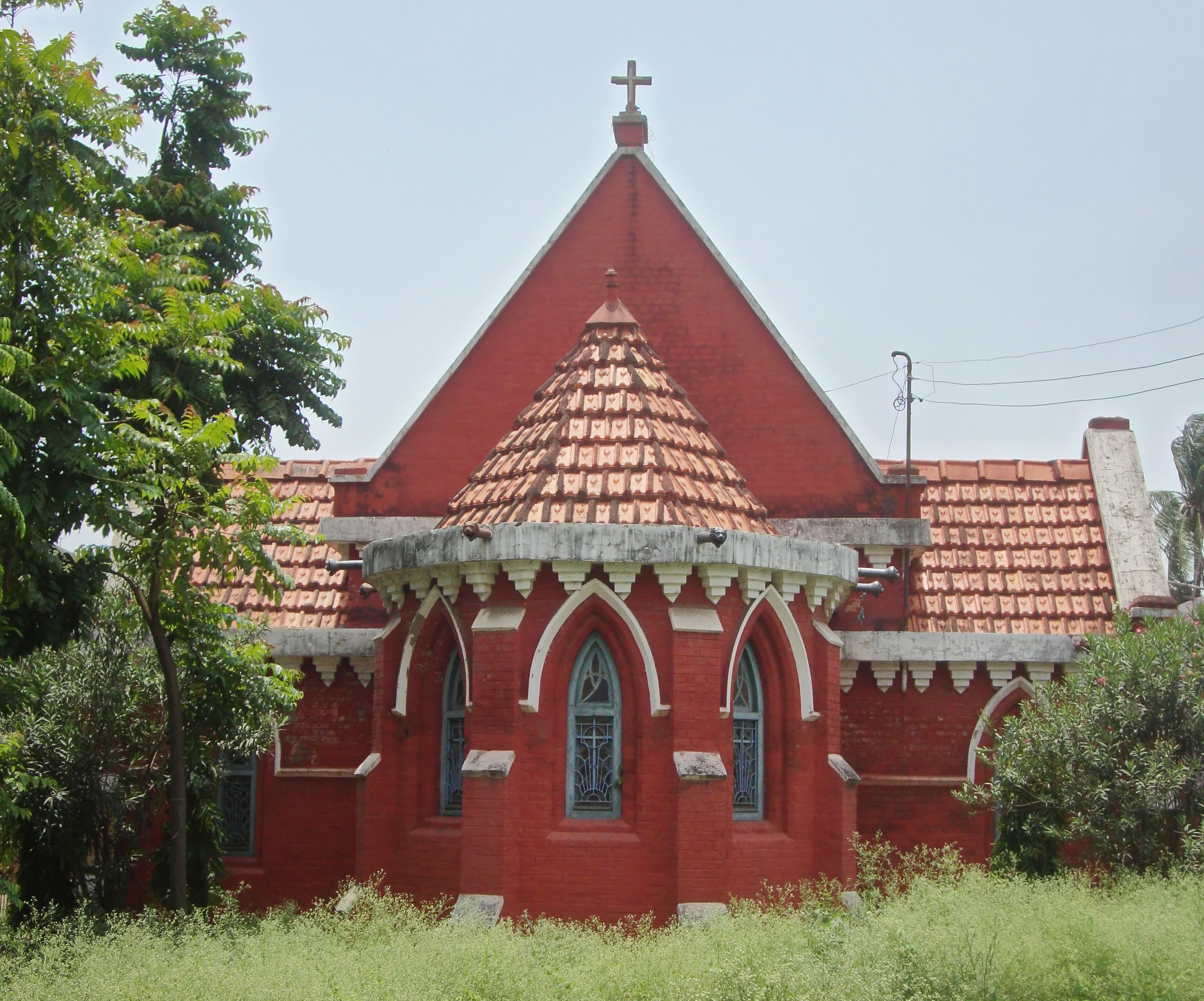
Christ Church

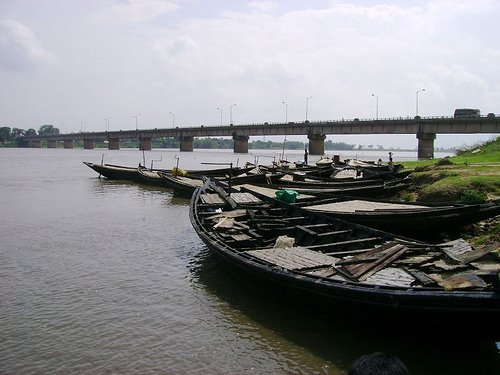
Damodar River

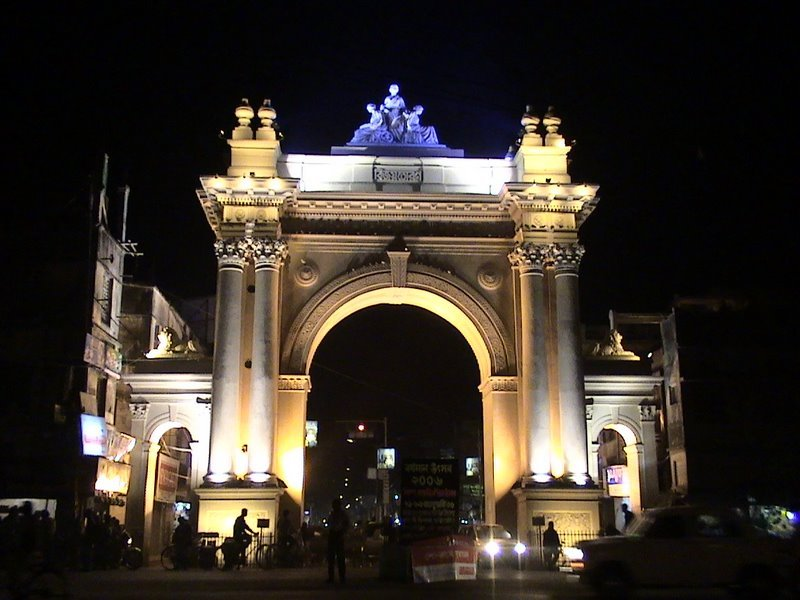
Curzon Gate

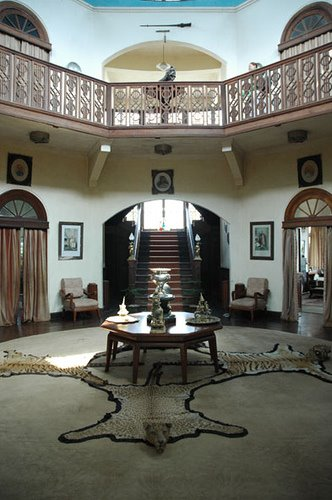
Inside view of the palace of Burdwan Maharaja

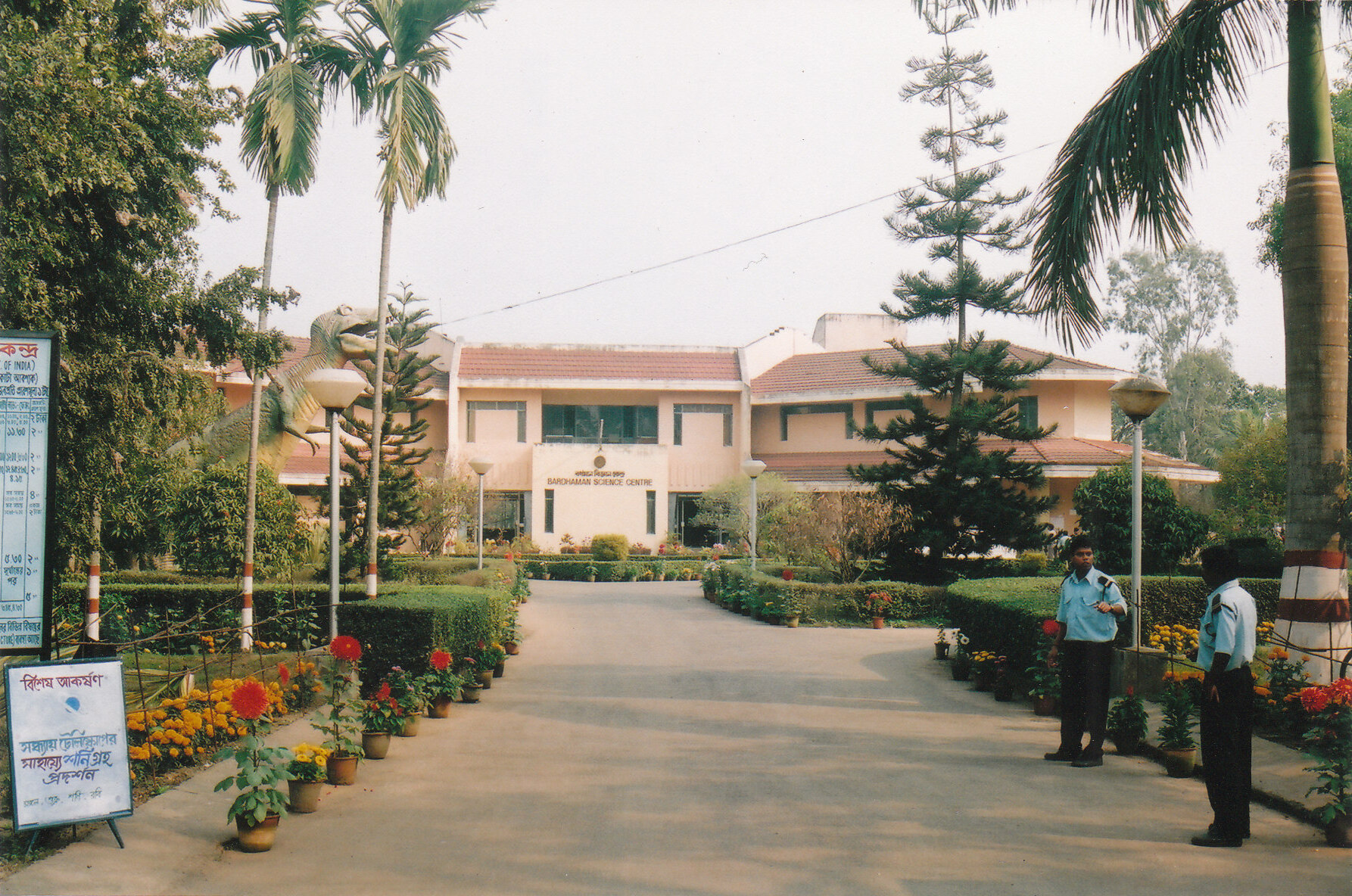
Science Centre

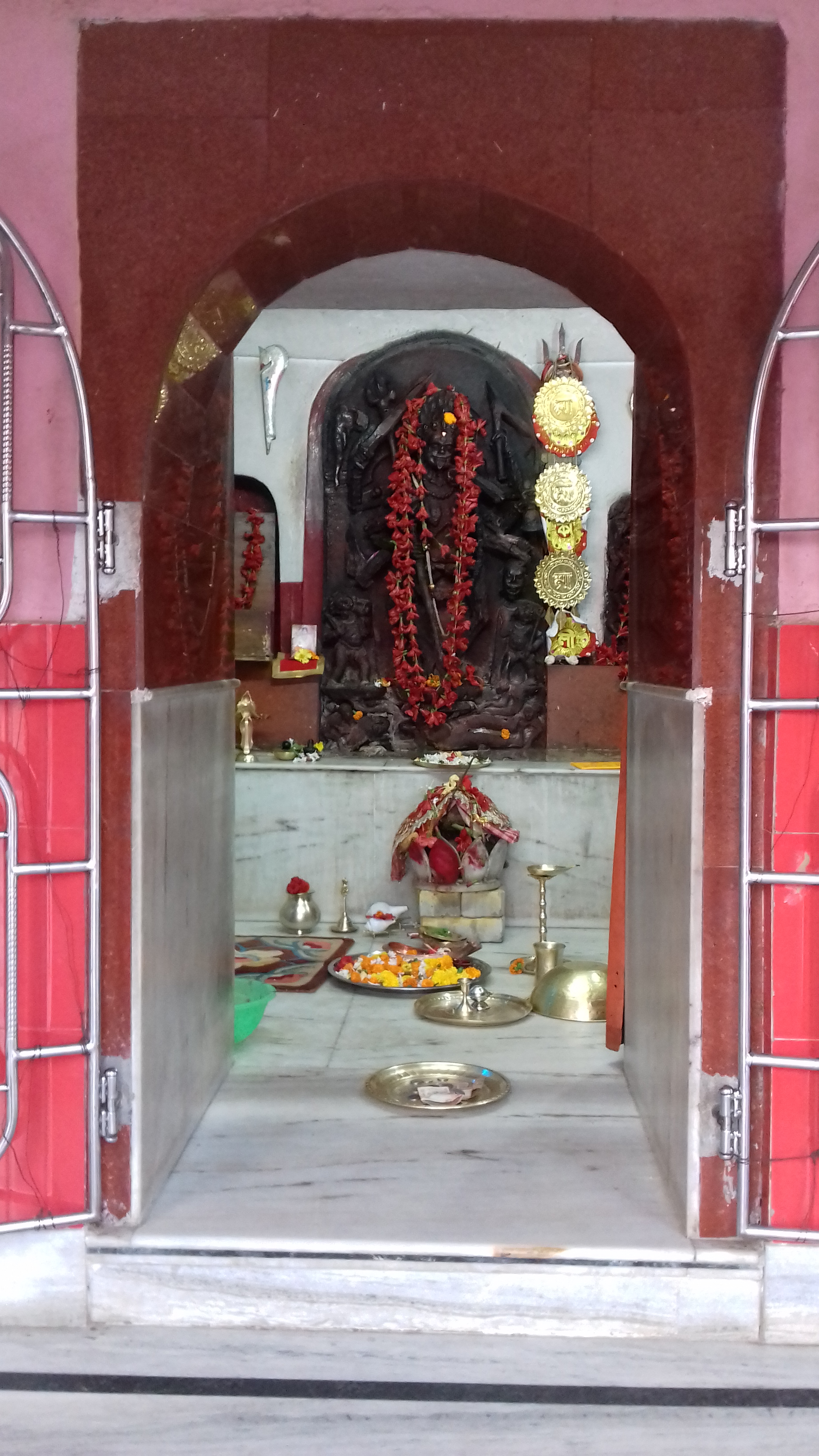
Maa Kankaleshwari at her temple

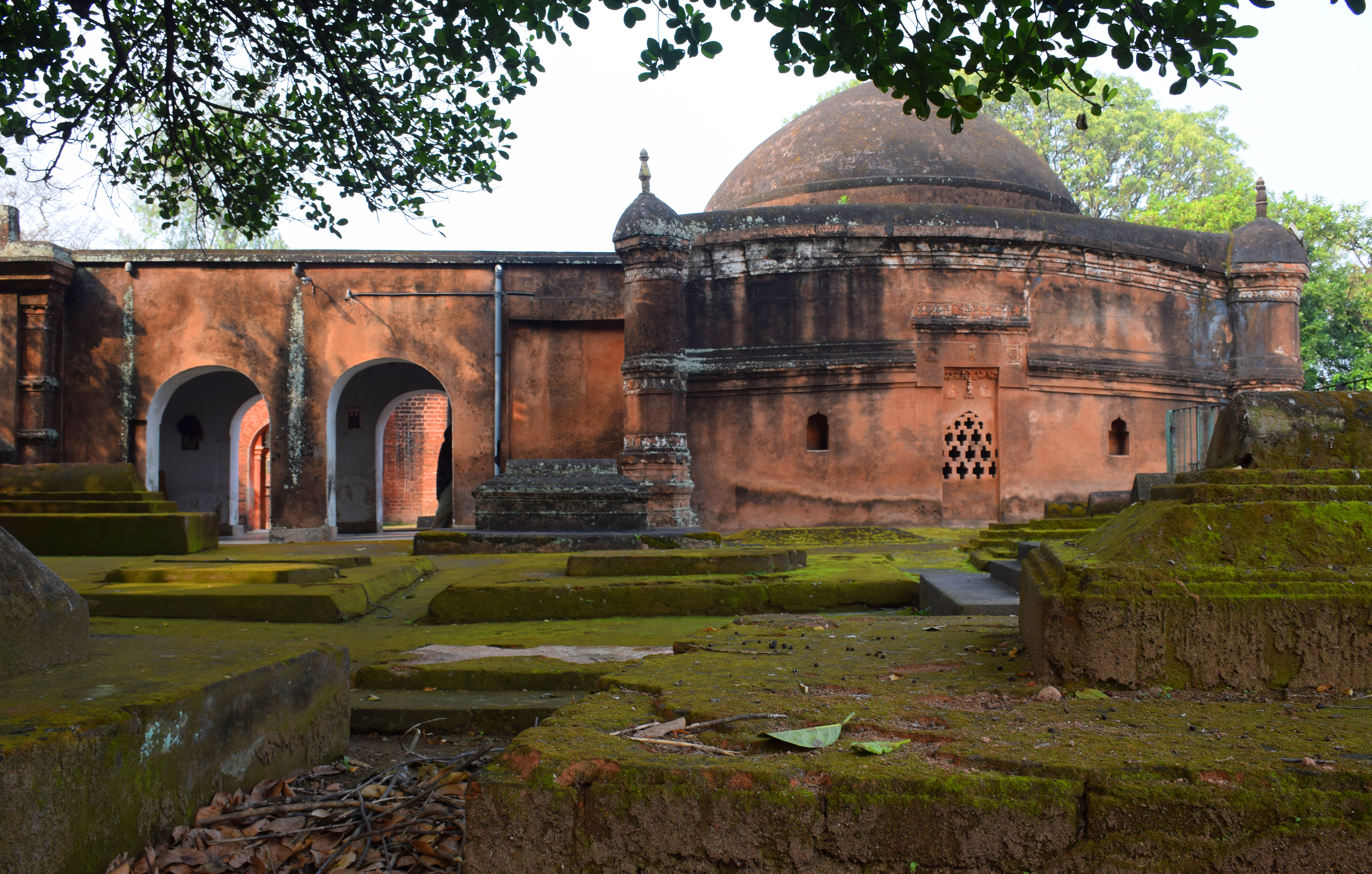
Mazar of Sufi Pir Baharam Sakka

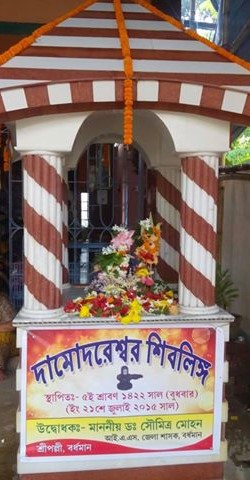
Damodareshwar Shiva Temple, Damodarpally, Burdwan

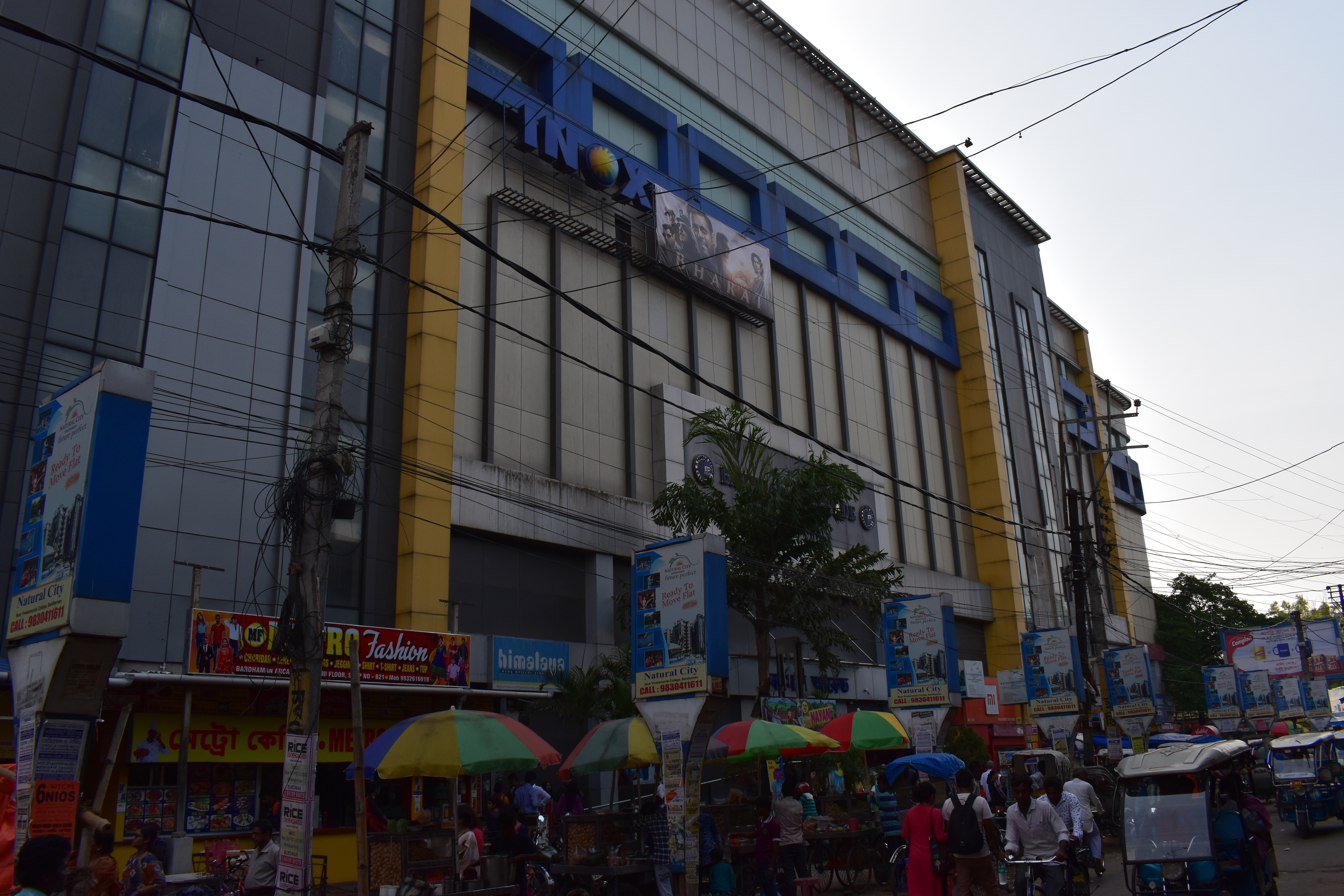
Burdwan Arcade

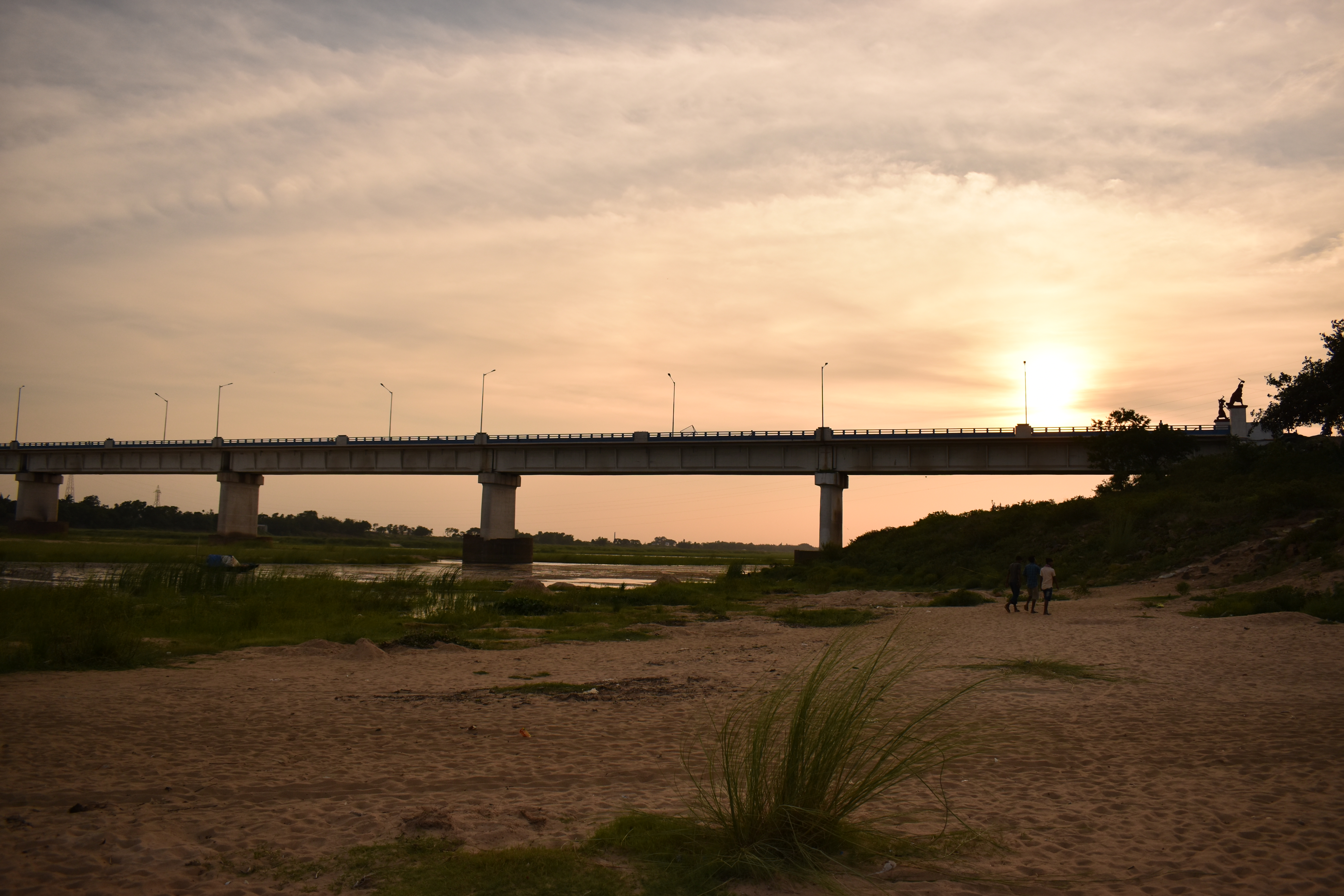
Damodar River
- Curzon Gate – the Curzon Gate was built in 1902–1903, for the coronation of Maharaja Bijay Chand Mahatab. The former royal palace is located a kilometre from the gate. The pomp and grandeur of Lord Curzon's visit to Bardhaman in 1904 established the name of the gate as Curzon Gate. It is also known as Bijay Toran.
- Tombs of Sher Afgan and Qutbuddin Khan Koka - Mehr-un-Nissa, then wife of Sher Afgan, jagirdar of Bardhaman, was once a resident of Bardhaman. It is said that the Mughal emperor Jahangir had fallen in love with her and was determined to marry her. He tried to get her with the help of his foster-brother and subahdar of Bengal, Qutbuddin Khan Koka. Sher Afgan died during a fight with Qutbuddin Khan Koka, who also was killed. Both were buried side by side at Bardhaman in 1607 (or 1610 according to some sources), in the same place as Pir Baharam Sikka, a Persian Sufi saint. Mehr-un-Nissa ultimately emerged as the Empress Nur Jahan.
- Rajbari – the palace of the Bardhaman Raj family, was built by Mahatabchand in the 19th century, at a site that is earlier believed to have a Mughal fort. The Rajbari was built by the Kolkata-based Burn and Company. The main hall has many valuable paintings. Uday Chand Mahtab handed over the Rajbati to the state government. It now houses the administrative offices of the University of Burdwan.
- Golapbag, Ramna Bagan and Deer Park – Golapbag was developed as a botanical and zoological garden in the 19th century. It contained lakes for boating and Hawa Mahal. Several academic sections of the University of Burdwan are located there. Ramna Bagan once had a Brahmo Samaj. It now has a deer park.
- Sarbamangala temple - the temple of Sarbamangala, the presiding deity of the Bardhaman Raj and believed to have been found on the sand-bed of the Damodar River. It is a navaratna temple with a nata mandir that has a terracotta Durga panel.
- Bardhamaneswar Shiva temple - the Shiva temple has a huge idol. Many believe that the Shiva lingam in the temple was established by Chand Sadagar of Manasamangal fame.
- Kamalakanta Kalibari - it is a Kali temple associated with the poet-devotee Sadhak Kamalakanta.
- 108 Shiva temple complex - the Shiva temple complex, constructed by Maharani Bishnu Kumari, at Nawabhat, near Bardhaman, has a picturesque setting. The temple complex, built in 1788, fell into disrepairs and was thoroughly renovated by the Birla Public Welfare Trust.
- Kankaleshwari Mandir – the temple at Kanchanagar, has a deity resembling a human skeleton. It is a navaratna temple with terracotta carvings. The idol is that of a six feet tall eight armed goddess Chamunda.
- Tomb of Khwaja Anwar Berh - the tomb of the Mughal warrior, buried at Poddarhat in 1315 Hijri, is a fine example of Mughal architecture.
- Shershahi Kalo Masjid- the mosque in the Puratan Chak (Payrakhana Road) area was built during the reign of Sher Shah Suri.
- Shahi Jumma Masjid- the mosque with three minarets is a historical structure erected behind the Rajbati by Azim-ush-Shan, grandson of Aurangzeb and then subahdar of Bengal, Bihar and Odisha.
- Burdwan Science Centre- a high standard science museum near the university campus.
- Meghnad Saha Planetarium- inaugurated in 1994, the main instrument was a gift from the Government of Japan to the University of Burdwan. The second planetarium in the state, built to international standards, it is named after the Indian scientist Meghnad Saha. Located near Golapbag, it has arrangement for six shows daily with 90 seats in each show. It is closed on Mondays.
- Birhata Kalibari (Boro Maa): The temple of 10 feet sculpture of goddess Kali made up of touchstone. The goddess is known locally as Boro Maa. The locality had been named after this temple as Kali Bazar. The temple has two parts bisected by a lane. One part contains Kali Mandir and the other, Durga Mandir.
- Christ Church: Christ Church Bardhaman is a church in Bardhaman near "Curzon Gate".
- Town Hall : The Town Hall was built sometime between 1890 and 1894 and was handed to the Municipality of Bardhaman to help them preserve the remnants of Lala Bansogopal Nandey. The municipality board restored the hall in 1990 to its present form of 2400 square feet from its earlier form of 704 square feet with a seating capacity of 485 seats.

== Notable people ==
- Khokan Das - politician and member of All India Trinamool Congress
- Batukeshwar Dutt - Indian freedom fighter (from Khandaghosh)
- Ankush Hazra, actor in Bengali language films
- Subhashree Ganguly - actress, model and the winner of Anandalok Nayikar Khonje 2006.
- Mokbula Manzoor - Bangladeshi author and novelist.
- Ankhi Mukherjee - Professor of English literature
- Sandip Nandy - Indian former professional footballer who played as a goalkeeper.
