= Religion in West Bengal =

Overview of religions in West Bengal, India

Religion in West Bengal (2011)
1. Hinduism (70.5%)
2. Islam (27.0%)
3. Christianity (0.72%)
4. Buddhism (0.31%)
5. No religion (0.25%)
6. Jainism (0.07%)
7. Sikhism (0.07%)
8. Other Religions (inc. Tribal religions, Judaism and Zoroastrianism) (1.03%)

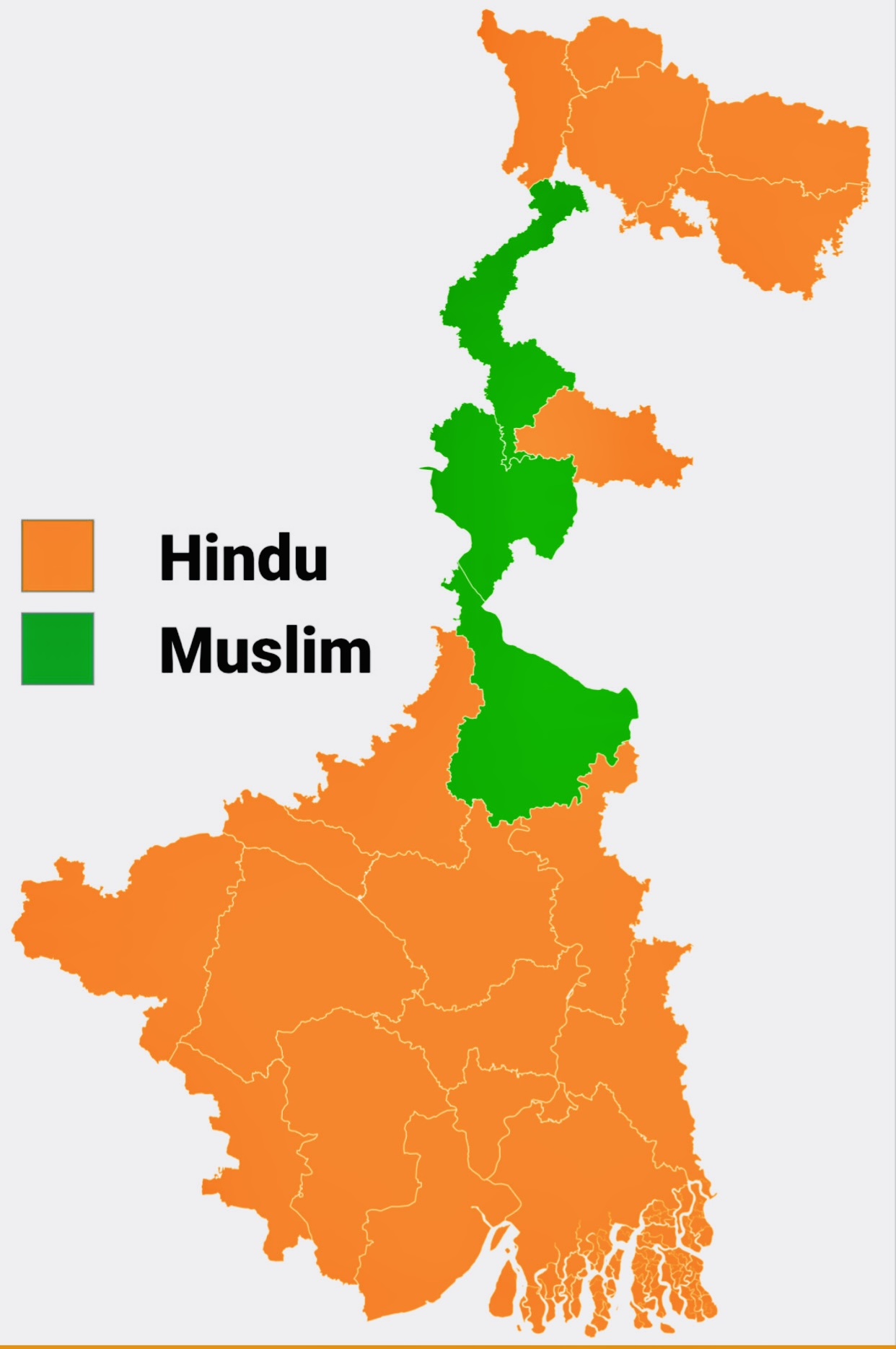
Largest religion by district in West Bengal, 2011 census

Religion in West Bengal is composed of diversified beliefs and practices. As per the 2011 census, Hinduism is the largest and biggest religion practised by Indian Bengalis in the state, followed by Islam which is the second largest and biggest minority religion in the state, accounting for a significant 27% of the population. Smaller percentage of people adheres to Christianity, Buddhism, Jainism, Sikhism, Animism, Zoroastrianism & Judaism or are Irreligious.

== Statistics ==
Religion wise historical population of West Bengal
Census year Religions	Total population	Hinduism	Islam	Christianity	Buddhism	Sikhism	Jainism	Other religions	Not Stated
1951	26,299,980	20,751,412	5,118,269	181,775	81,665	30,623	19,607	116,629	
1961	34,926,279	27,523,358	6,985,287	204,530	112,253	34,184	26,940	38,610	1,117
1971	44,312,011	34,611,864	9,064,338	251,782	121,504	35,084	32,203	194,126	1,140
1981	54,580,647	42,007,159	11,743,259	319,670	156,296	49,054	38,663	263,414	3,132
1991	68,077,965	50,866,624	16,075,836	383,477	203,578	55,392	34,355	452,403	6,300
2001	80,176,197	58,104,835	20,240,543	515,150	243,364	66,391	55,223	895,796	54,895
2011	91,276,115	64,385,546	24,654,825	658,618	282,898	63,523	60,141	942,297	228,267

Religion in West Bengal by decades (percentage-wise)
Decade	Hinduism (%)	Islam (%)	Other (%)
1951 (1950s)	78.90	19.46	1.64
1961 (1960s)	78.80	20.00	1.20
1971 (1970s)	78.11	20.46	1.43
1981 (1980s)	76.96	21.52	1.52
1991 (1990s)	74.72	23.61	1.67
2001 (2000s)	72.47	25.25	2.28
2011 (2010s)	70.54	27.01	2.45

== History ==
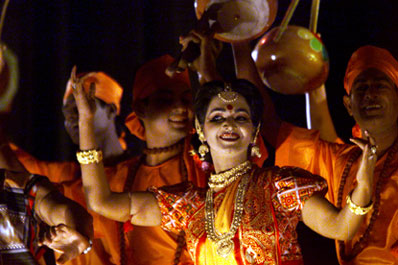
Bengali artists performing a traditional Bengali dance

Hinduism had existed in the region of Bengal before the 20th century BCE and by the third century, Buddhism and Jainism were popular too. Gaur, the first sovereign Hindu kingdom in Bengal with its capital in Karnasubarna in modern-day Murshidabad district, was set up by Shashanka, a Shaivaite king who ruled approximately between 600 AD and 625 AD. The modern structure of Bengali Hindu society was developed during the rule of the Sena dynasty in the 12th century AD. West Bengal has been home to several famous religious teachers, including Sri Chaitanya, Sri Ramakrishna, Rammohan Roy, Swami Vivekananda, A. C. Bhaktivedanta Swami Prabhupada and Paramahansa Yogananda who helped to abolish archaic practices like sati, dowry, and caste-based discrimination or untouchability that crept into the Hindu society during the Middle Ages. But they also played an important role in the resurgence of Hindu nationalism in Bengal. This inherent Hindu identity was the chief factor in Bengali Hindu Homeland Movement which successfully resisted the plan to create a United Bengal and campaigned for the establishing a separate Bengali Hindu homeland within Indian union on the eve of Partition of India in 1947.

The history of West Bengal starts in 1947 with the Partition of Bengal, when the Hindu-dominated western part of British Bengal Province became the Indian state of West Bengal. When India gained independence in 1947, Bengal was partitioned along religious lines. The western part went to India (and was named West Bengal) while the eastern part joined Pakistan as a province called East Bengal (later renamed East Pakistan, giving rise to independent Bangladesh in 1971).

Buddhism has a rich heritage in Bengal, flourishing during the Pala dynasty (750–1174 CE), but it has roots even earlier, dating to the reign of Emperor Ashoka (r. c.268–232 BCE). Buddhism's decline in Bengal, starting in the 12th century, was a gradual process influenced by factors like the rise of Hinduism, loss of royal patronage, and the subsequent Muslim invasions, eventually leading to its near extinction in the region. The region was a bastion of the ancient Buddhist Mauryan and Palan empires, when the Mahayana and Vajrayana schools flourished. South-Eastern Bengal was ruled by the medieval Buddhist Kingdom of Mrauk U during the 16th and 17th centuries. The British Raj influenced the emergence of modern community.

Sufism played a crucial role in the spread of Islam in Bengal, with Sufi missionaries arriving from various regions and influencing local rulers and populations, leading to the establishment of a Muslim society and a syncretic culture. The political landscape shifted significantly in 1204 with Bakhtiyar Khilji's conquest, marking the onset of Muslim rule in Bengal. This period saw an influx of immigrants from the broader Muslim world, which profoundly influenced the existing societal fabric.

The establishment of the independent Bengal Sultanate in 1352 under Shamsuddin Ilyas Shah further cemented Islamic influence. The sultanate promoted a distinct Bengali socio-linguistic identity by patronising the Bengali language alongside Persian and Arabic. Notably, Sultan Jalaluddin Muhammad Shah, originally Hindu-born, funded the construction of Islamic institutions as far as Makkah and Madinah, known as al-Madaris al-Banjaliyyah (Bengali madrasas).

During the Mughal era (1576–1765), Bengal, referred to as Bengal Subah, was considered a prized province. Emperor Akbar's development of the modern Bengali calendar exemplifies the Mughals' influence on the region's cultural landscape.

The spread of Islam in Bengal was a gradual process influenced by various factors, including the efforts of Sufi missionaries, the establishment of Muslim political authority, and socio-economic changes that encouraged the adoption of Islam among local populations.

By the early 18th century, there were a few Sikhs living in the region of Bengal. One famous Sikh who lived during this time period was Omichand, a local Khatri Sikh banker and landlord who participated in the conspiracy against Nawab Siraj ud-Daulah with the East India Company. The Flemish artist Frans Baltazard Solvyns arrived in Calcutta in 1791 and observed many Sikhs, whom one could differentiate from the rest of the land's inhabitants by their garbs and traditions. He etched depictions of a Khalsa Sikh and a Nanakpanthi, which was published in 1799.

== Hinduism ==
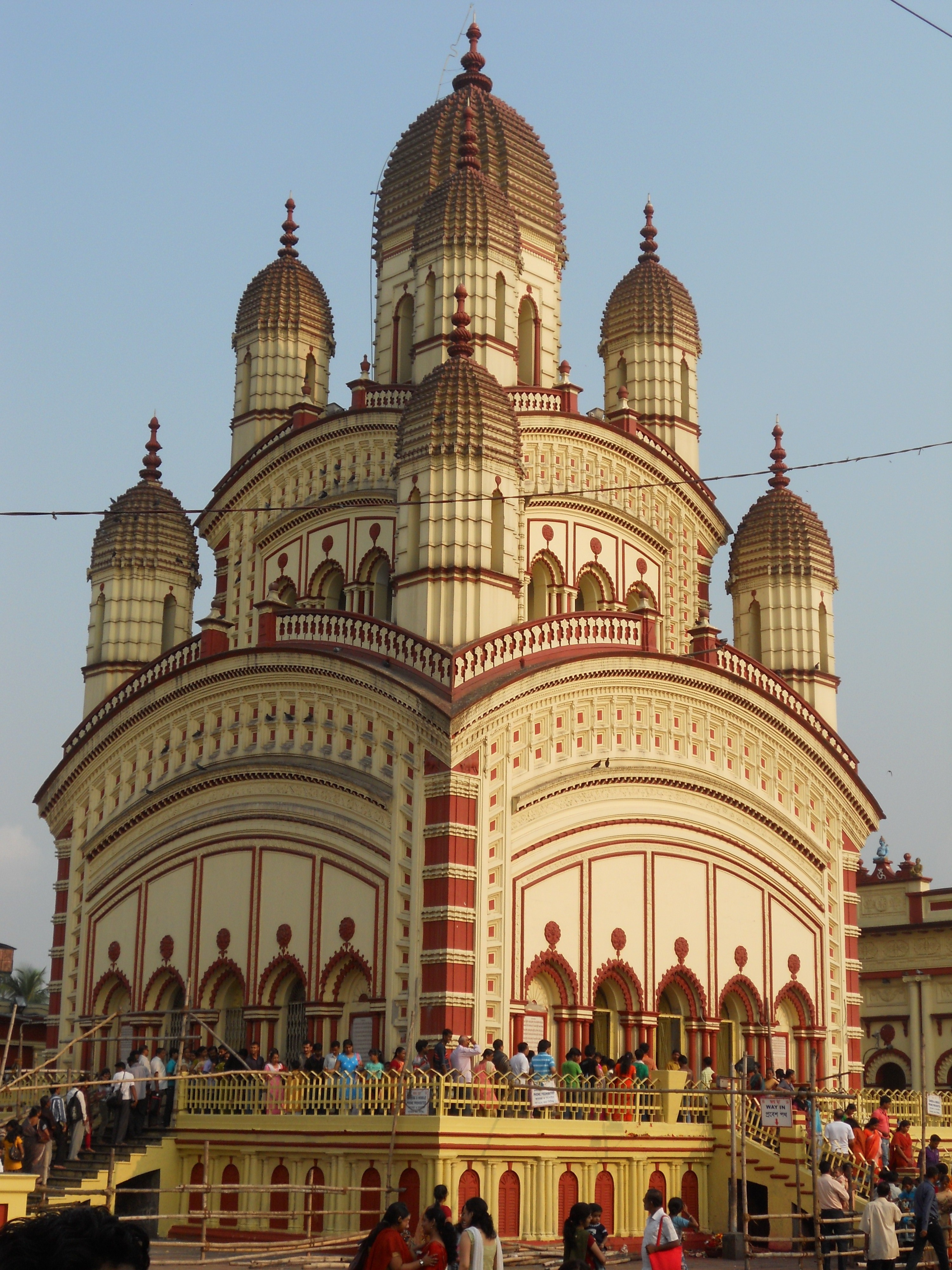
Dakshineswar Kali temple, one of the largest Hindu temples of West Bengal

Hinduism is the largest religion of West Bengal which forms 70.54% of the state's population. Out of a total of 91.3 million people in the state, the Hindu population is approximately 64.4 million. Also out of 23 districts in West Bengal, Hindus are in majority in 20 districts and are minority in 3 districts namely- Uttar Dinajpur, Murshidabad and Malda district.

== Islam ==
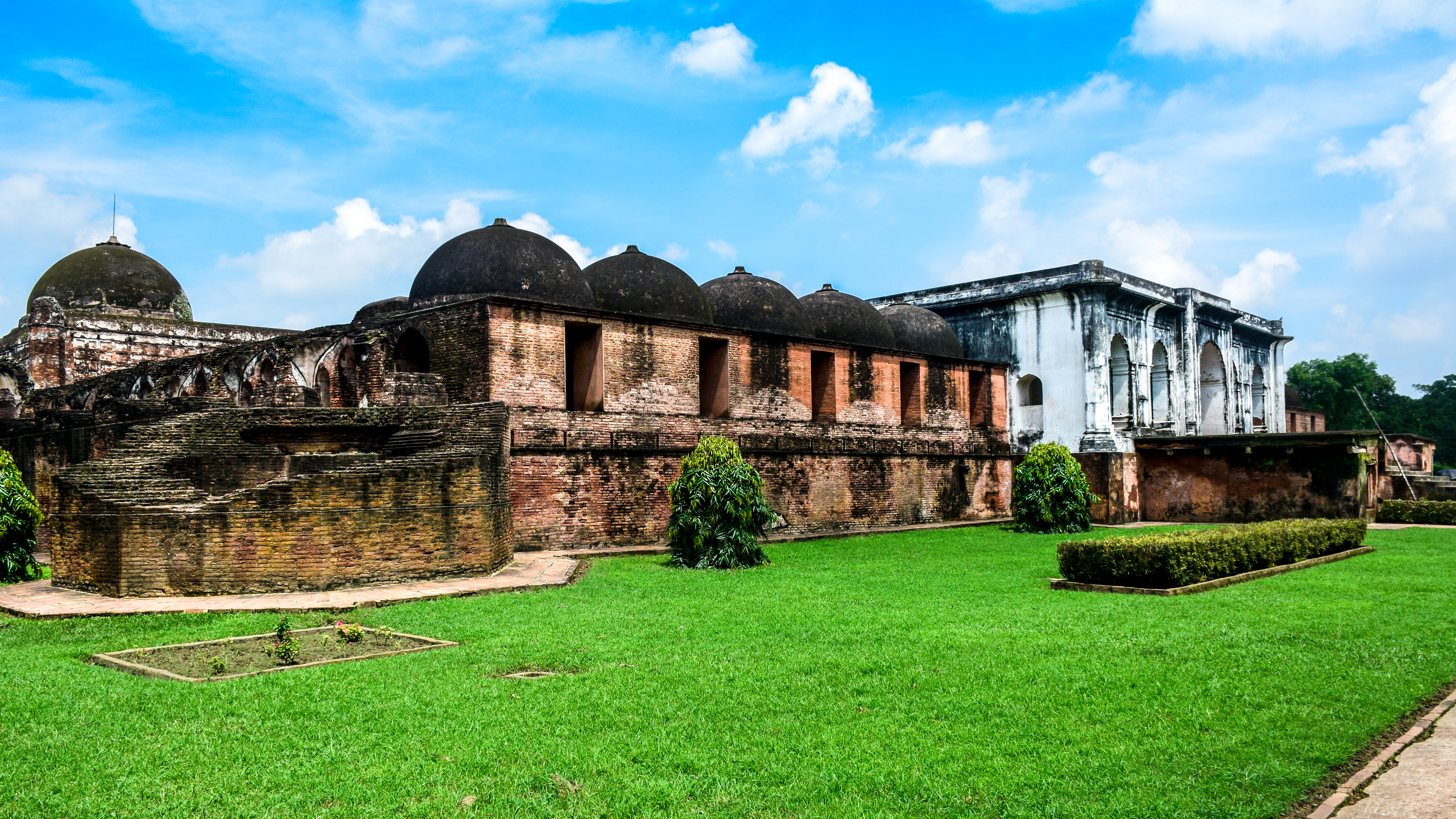
Katra Masjid, one of the oldest mosques ever existing in Bengal since the 12th century

Islam is the second largest religion of West Bengal. Muslims form 27% of the state's population according to the 2011 census. Out of total 91.3 million people in the state, the Muslim population is approximately 24.6 million.

== Christianity ==
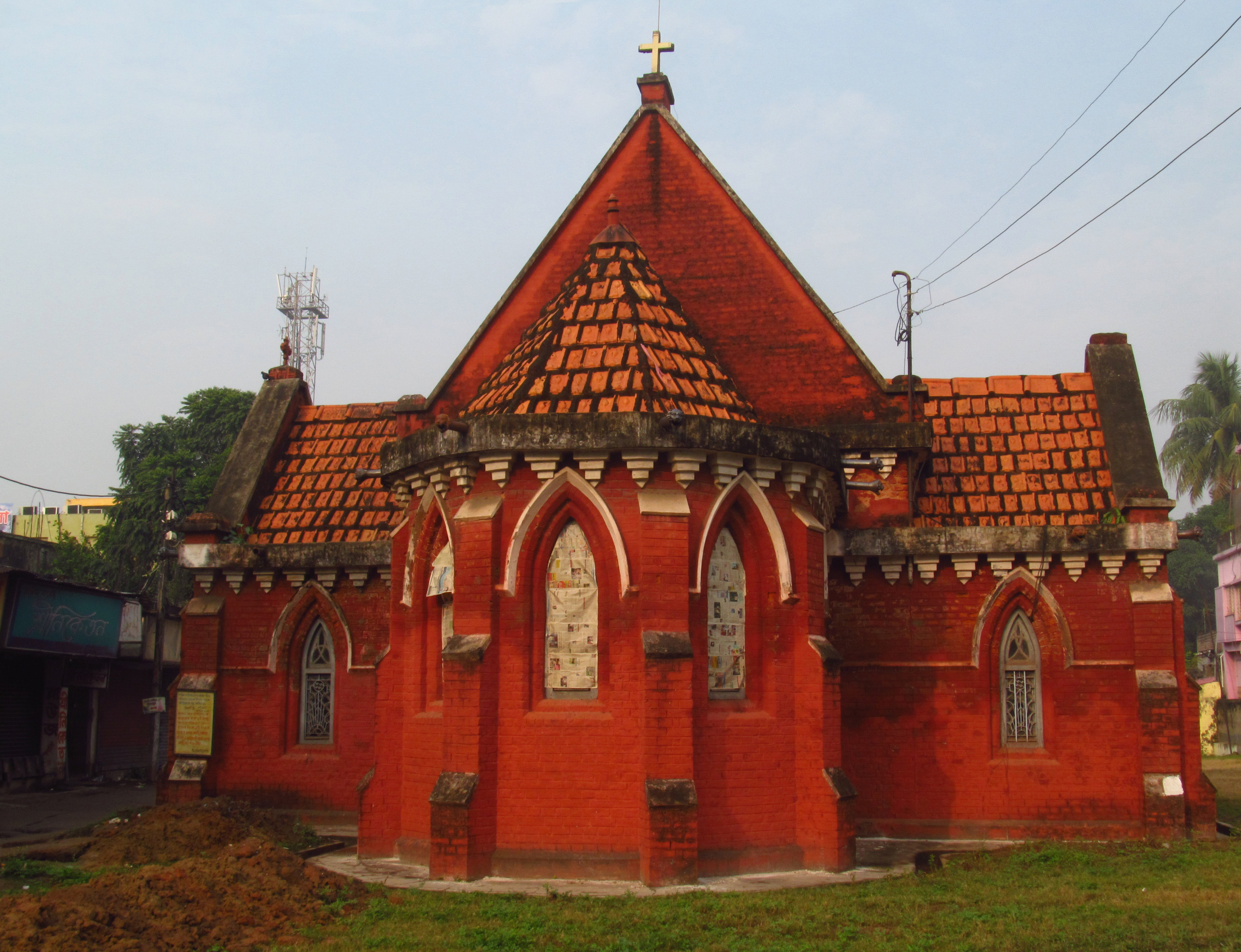
Christ Church Bardhaman town in Purba Bardhaman district of West Bengal

Christianity is the third largest religion in West Bengal. According to the 2011 Census of India, Christians comprised approximately 0.72% of West Bengal's total population, numbering around 658,618 individuals out of 91.3 million. Also out of 23 districts in West Bengal, Christians have a higher concentration in Darjeeling & Jalpaiguri, Kolkata.

== Buddhism ==
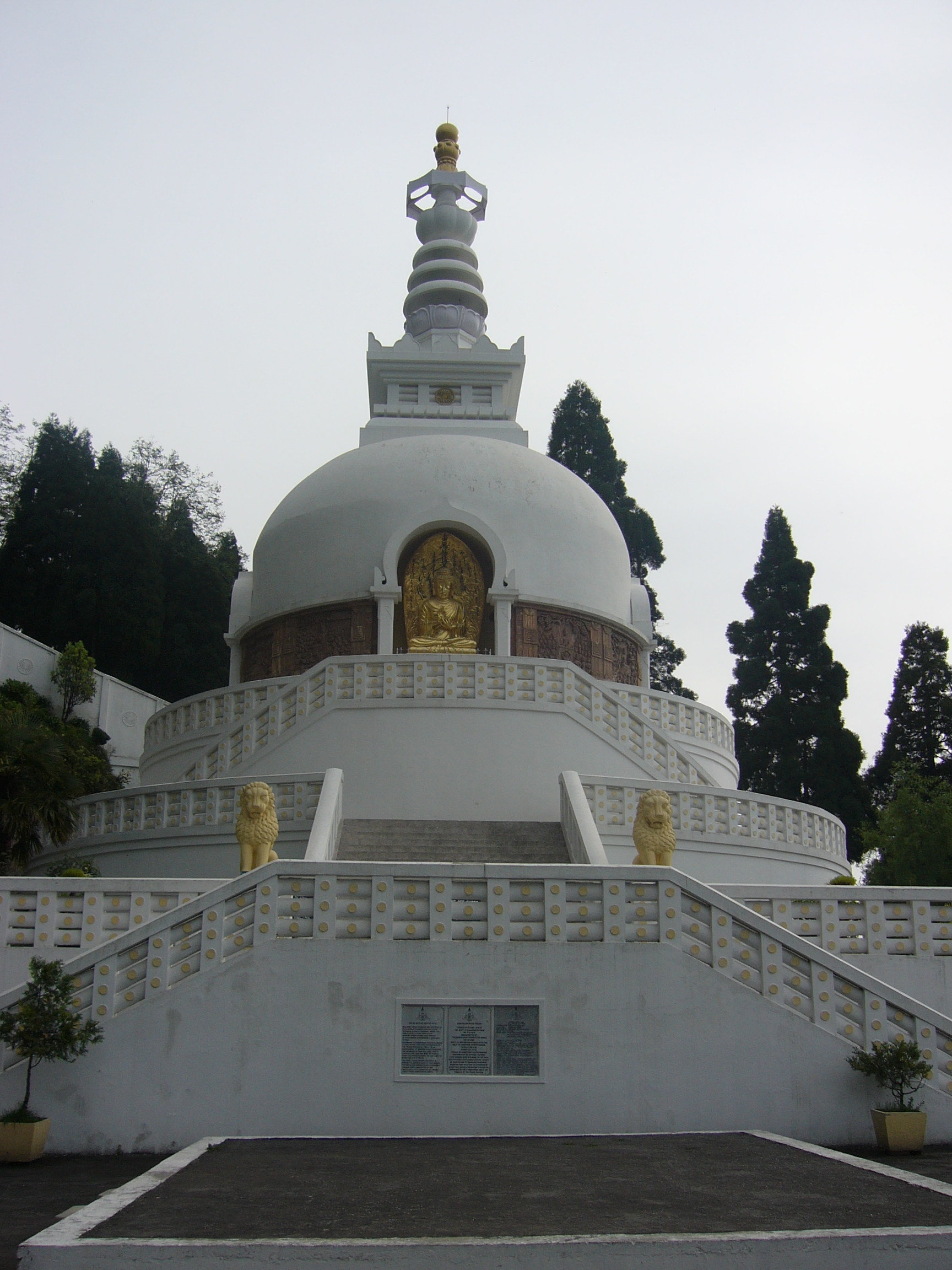
Peace Pagoda, Darjeeling, one of the important Buddhist pilgrimage center in India

Buddhism is the fourth largest religion of West Bengal with about 0.31% people responded that they were Buddhists during the 2011 Census of India. Out of total 91.3 million people in the state, the Buddhist population is approximately 2.82 lakhs. Also out of 23 districts in West Bengal, Buddhists have a higher concentration in Darjeeling.

== Other religions ==
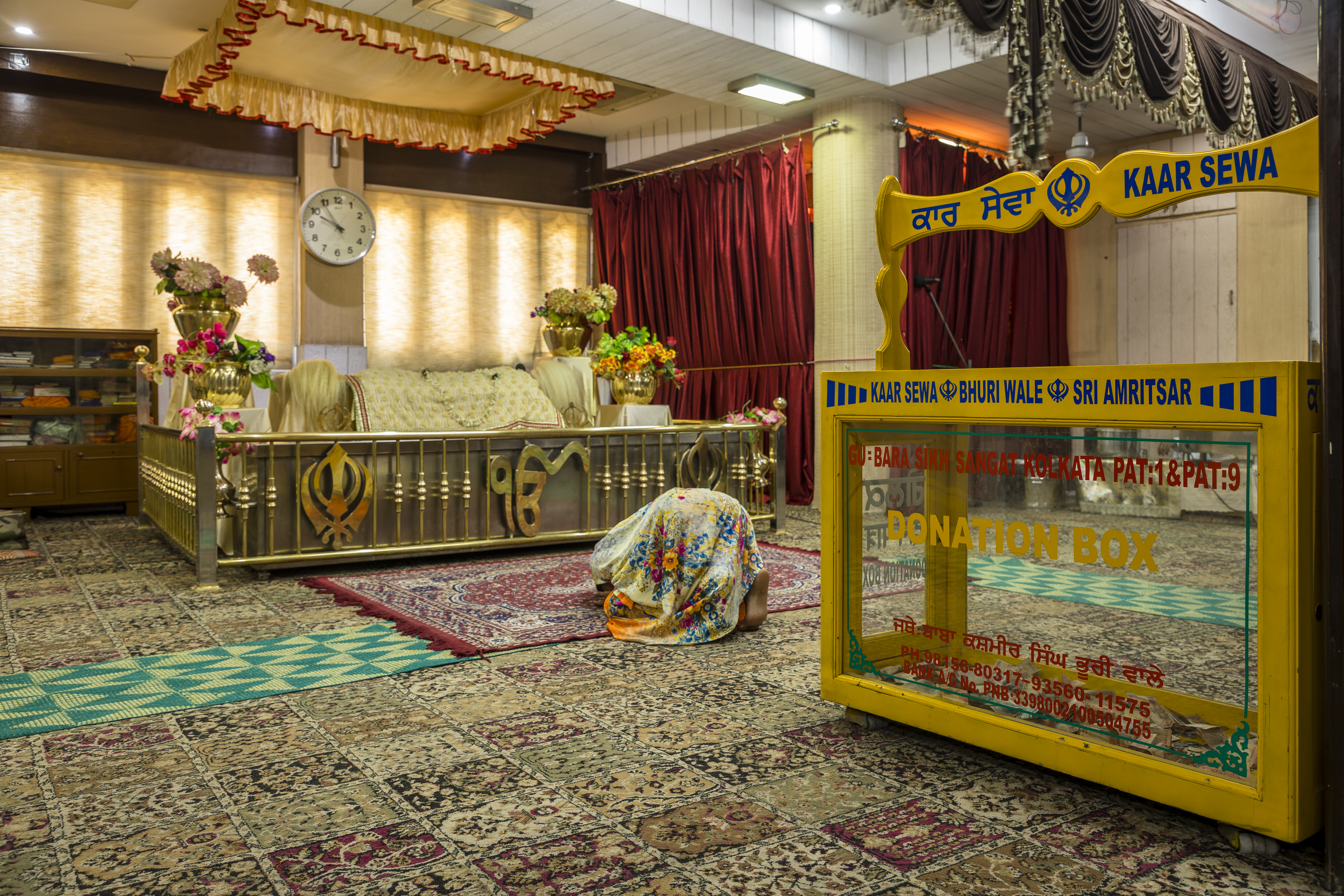
A Gurudwara in West Bengal's capital Kolkata

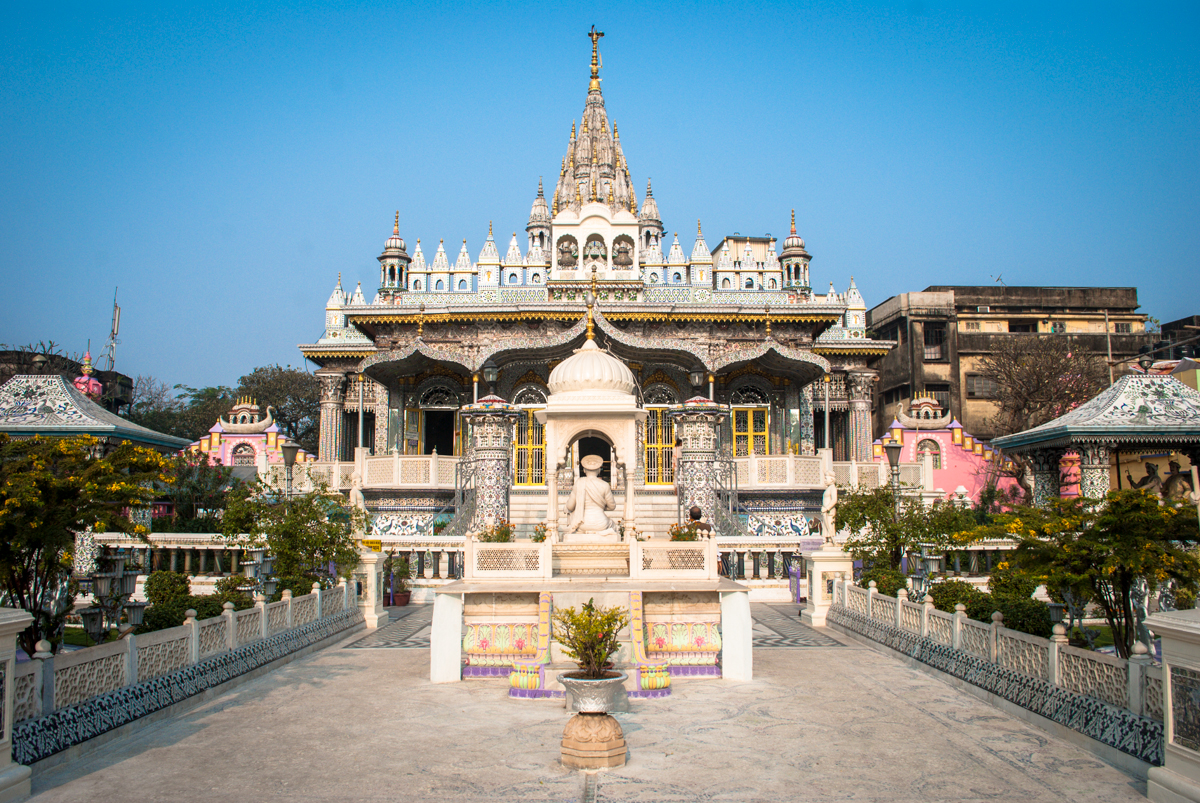
Calcutta Jain Temple

Sikhism and Jainism have a smaller presence in the state with around 63,523 & 60,141 people follow it respectively comprising 0.07% and 0.06% respectively.
