= Burdwan Municipal High School =

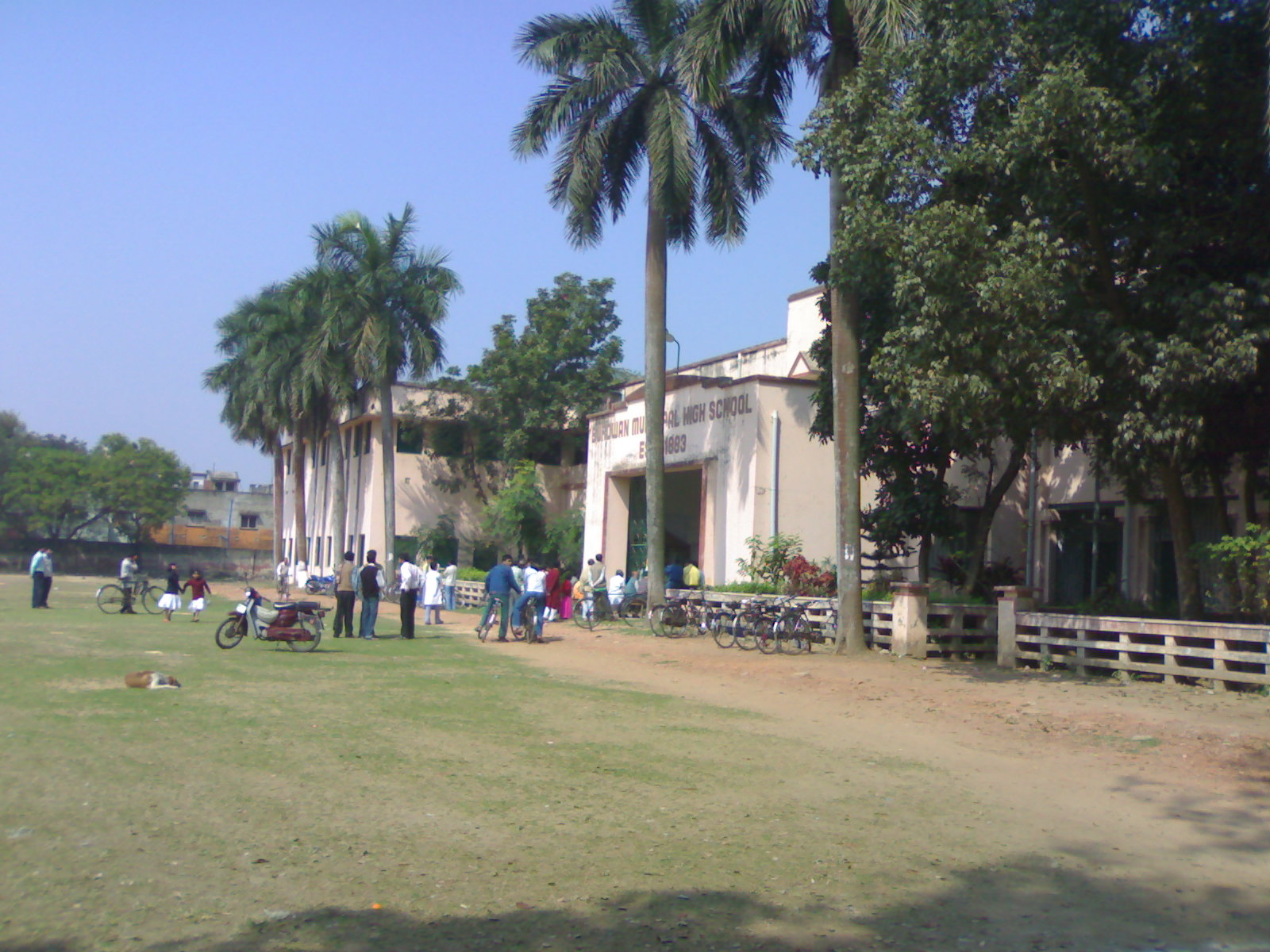

Information
- Type: Public School
- Motto: tamaso mā jyotirgamaya (en:From the darkness lead me to the light)
- Established: January 1, 1883; 143 years ago (as Burdwan Municipal High School) c. 1855; 171 years ago (renamed as Burdwan English School) 1855; 171 years ago (as Brahmo Samaj Boys' School)
- Founders: Maharshi Debendranath Tagore; Adi Brahmo Samaj; Bhagaban Chandra Bose (Father of J.C Bose)
- Status: Active
- School board: WBBSE & WBCHSE
- School district: Purba Bardhaman
- Authority: Burdwan Municipality, Government of West Bengal
- Session: January–December (I – X) June–May (XI – XII)
- Director: Smt Rita Mukherjee Mondal (Secretary)
- Headmaster: Arunava Chakroborty (Teacher-in-charge)
- Grades: I - XII
- Gender: Male
- Enrollment: 2500
- Language: Bengali & English
- Campus type: Urban
- Colors: White and maroon
- Sports: Burdwan Municipal School Cricket Club (B.M.S.C.C)
- Nickname: BMHSian
- Publication: Aranyak by Eco-club; The Forum a Little Magazine
- Yearbook: Kakoli
- Affiliation: Department of School Education (West Bengal)
- Alumni name: Chirantani
- Website: www.bmhschool.com

Burdwan Municipal High School (BMHS), located at the heart of Bardhaman, a town 95 km north-west of Kolkata, is one of the oldest boys' schools in India. The school was established in 1883 by Maharshi Debendranath Tagore, along with Adi Brahmo Samaj as Brahmo Samaj Boys' School. The school is located at the heart of Burdwan.

== History ==
In 1855 Maharshi Debendranath Tagore, along with Adi Brahmo Samaj established Brahmo Samaj Boys' School (later renamed Burdwan English School). Bhagaban Chandra Basu, the then Deputy magistrate of Burdwan and father of Sir Jagadish Chandra Bose, was one of its founders. After the demise of Mahatab Chandra the Brahma movement in Burdwan became weak for lack of patronage and the school became in financial straits. Burdwan Municipality took over the school and Burdwan Municipal High School started its journey anew in 1883.

== Curriculum ==
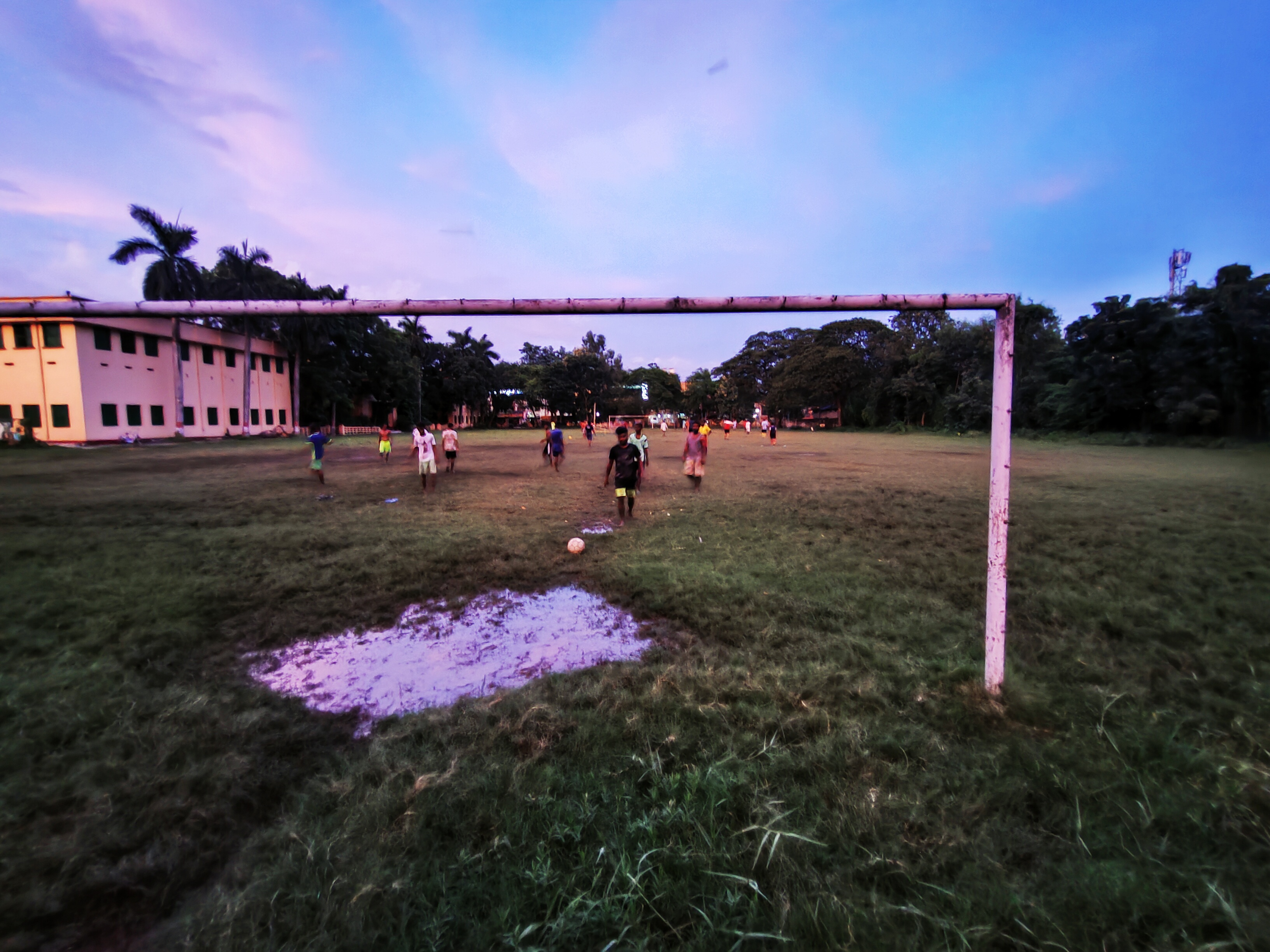
play ground of burdwan municipal high school

This school is a higher secondary school (from class 1 to 12).

The curriculum is as per West Bengal Board of Secondary Education (until class 10) and West Bengal Council of Higher Secondary Education (Class 11 and 12).

The common curriculum is followed until class 10. In class 11 and 12, there are 3 streams: Science, Commerce and Arts.

== Achievements ==
The school is known for its result in Madhyamik Examination as well as Higher Secondary Examination. Students of this school have secured multiple ranks both in examinations.

== See also ==
- List of schools in West Bengal
