= Curzon Gate, Bardhaman =

Arch in Bardhaman

Curzon Gate
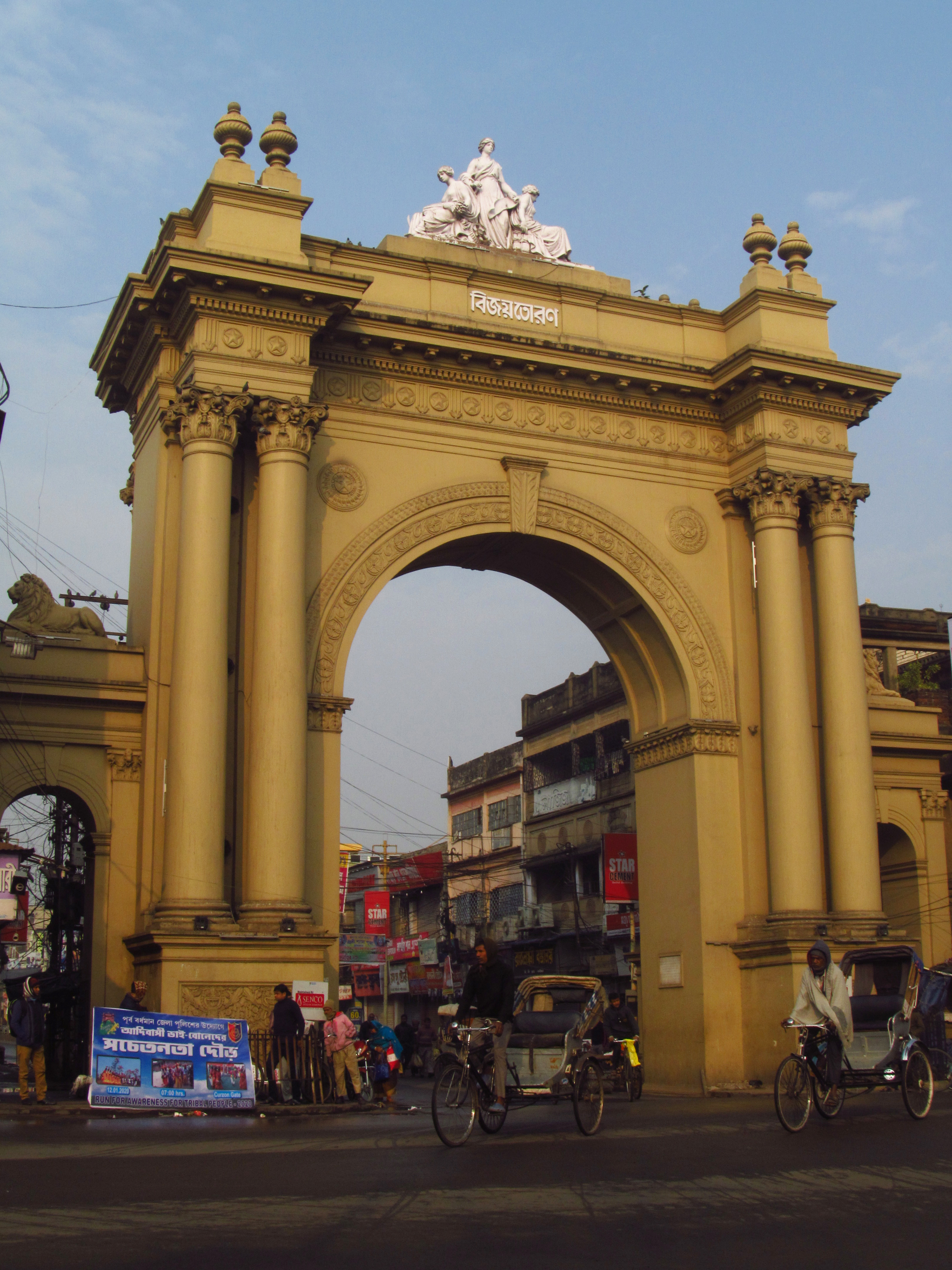
- Curzon Gate
- Interactive map of the Curzon Gate area
- Alternative names: Bijoy Toran

General information
- Location: Bardhaman, India
- Coordinates: 23.2404°N 87.8675°E
- Completed: 1904
- Owner: Public Works Department, Government of West Bengal

The Curzon Gate, also known as the Bijay Toran, is a prominent landmark in Bardhaman city in Purba Bardhaman district in West Bengal, India. It is located at the crossing of Bijoy Chand Road and Grand Trunk Road.

== History ==
It was built in 1902/1903, on the occasion of the coronation of Maharaja Bijay Chand Mahatab as ruler of the Bardhaman Raj. The gate is located on the Grand Trunk Road. The former royal palace is located 1 km from the gate.

The pomp and grandeur of Lord Curzon’s visit to Bardhaman in 1904 established the name of the gate as Curzon Gate.

The gate arch is supported by eight circular columns. Three female figurines, with swords, boats, and sheaves of corn in their hands, on the arch signify progress in agriculture and commerce. There are twenty-one circles with twenty-one illustrations at the top portion of the gate. Due to presence of stars in the gate it was initially named 'Star Of India' when it was built. The structure was constructed by masons from Italy.

After the Bardhaman Raj was incorporated into the newly independent India, the gate was referred to as Bijoy Toran, but it is still popularly known as Curzon Gate. Since 1974, the gate has been maintained by the Public Works Department of the Government of West Bengal.
