= St. Xavier's College, Burdwan =

Undergraduate college in India

- Other name: SXCB
- Type: Jesuit, Catholic
- Established: 2014; 12 years ago
- Affiliations: University of Burdwan
- President: Fr. Jeyaraj Velusami, SJ
- Principal: Dr. G. Paul Arockiam, SJ
- Location: Purba Bardhaman, West Bengal, 733103, India; 23.2178051°N 87.8746491°E
- Campus: Urban
- Language: English
- Website: sxcb.edu.in
- Location within West Bengal Location within India

St. Xavier's College, Burdwan, West Bengal, India, is an undergraduate college opened in 2014 by the Calcutta Province of the Society of Jesus, the body which also administers St. Xavier's College, Kolkata and other institutes throughout India and abroad. It was recently accredited with a B++ grade in its first cycle of NAAC.

== History ==
Purba Bardhaman (i.e. East Bardhaman) is about 100 km (62 mi) north-west of Kolkata and serves as the district headquarters. The Jesuit roots of Bardhaman ("Burdwan") go back to the 1960s, when they opened an English medium school for the large Santhal Christian population.

Xavier's Burdwan was opened in July 2014 with Bishop Cyperian Monis of the Diocese of Asansol officiating.

The college is affiliated to The University of Burdwan. It offers three years honors courses: B.A. in English, Sociology, and Geography; B.Com. in Accountancy; and B.Sc. in Biotechnology, Computer Science, and Geography.

From 2018, as per a notification from the University of Burdwan, it is also offering a BCA (Bachelor of Computer Applications) [3-year] course.The college also offers a BBA(Bachelor of Business Administration) course.

The institution additionally offers a postgraduate programme in English.

== See also ==
- List of institutions of higher education in West Bengal
- Education in West Bengal
- List of Jesuit sites
