= Christ Church Bardhaman =

Church in West Bengal

Coordinates: 23.2409°N 87.8673°E

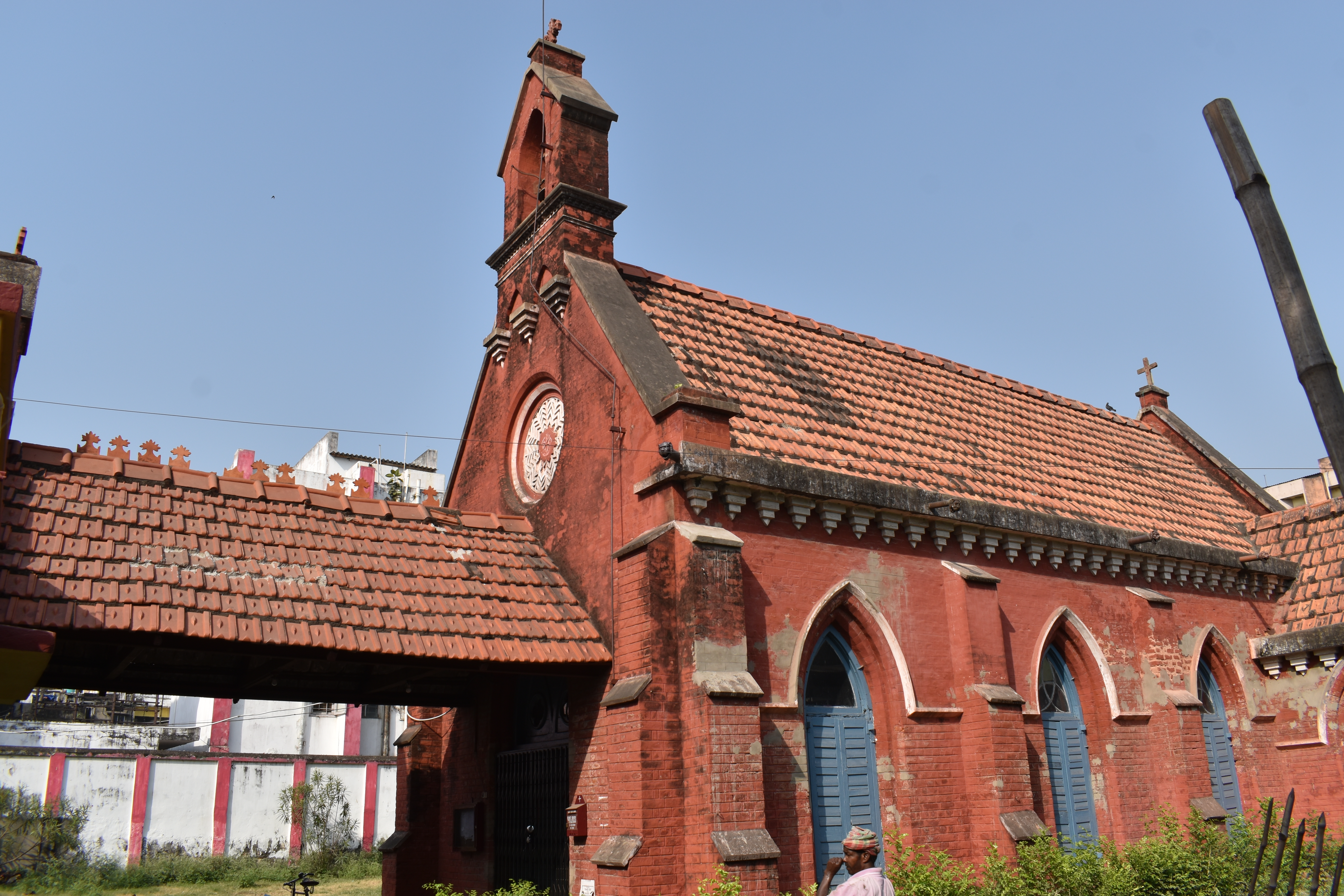
Christ Church of Bardhaman

Christ Church Bardhaman is the oldest Church of undivided Bardhaman district. It is situated beside Grand Trunk Road in Bardhaman in the Indian state of West Bengal. The building was declared as heritage site by West Bengal Heritage Commission.

== History ==
The Christ Church was established in 1816 by Church Missionary Society of Bengal. Captain Charles Stuart, also known as ‘Hindoo Stuart, an officer of East India Company arranged an annual grant of Rs 12.50 from a royal family to maintain the church. It was built with red brick in typical British Architecture.
