= Mayurakshi Express =

Train in India

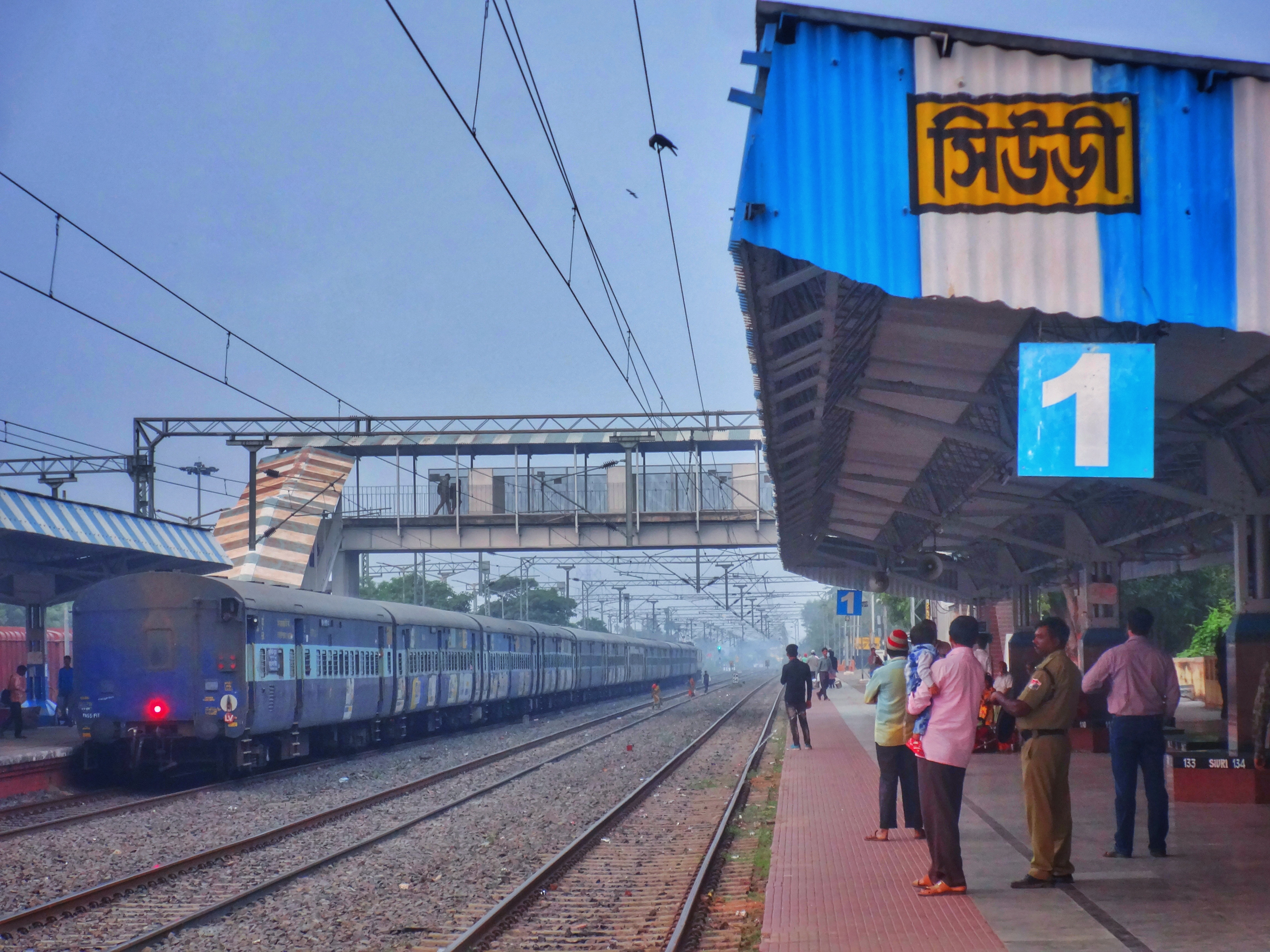
- 13046 DN Mayurakshi Express waiting at platform 2 of Siuri railway station

Overview
- Service type: Express train
- Status: Active
- First service: 26 January 1984; 42 years ago
- Current operator: Eastern Railways

Route
- Termini: Howrah; Deoghar Junction
- Stops: 25
- Distance travelled: 418 km (260 mi)
- Average journey time: Howrah–Deoghar: 8 h 10 min; Deoghar–Howrah: 8 h 20 min
- Service frequency: Daily
- Train numbers: Howrah–Deoghar: 13045; Deoghar–Howrah: 13046

On-board services
- Classes: General Unreserved, Second Sitting,3rd AC
- Seating arrangements: Yes
- Sleeping arrangements: No
- Catering facilities: No
- Baggage facilities: Overhead racks, Below the seats

Technical
- Rolling stock: ICF coach
- Track gauge: 1,676 mm (5 ft 6 in)
- Operating speed: Howrah–Deoghar: 110 km/h (68 mph) max; 51 km/h (32 mph) avg; Deoghar–Howrah: 110 km/h (68 mph) max; 50 km/h (31 mph) avg

Mayurakshi Express is a daily inter-city Express train operated by Eastern Railways in the Indian state of West Bengal. It runs between Howrah and Deoghar via Andal Junction and Rampurhat Junction. It previously ran between Howrah and Rampurhat as a fast passenger train (53045/46), but later it was extended to run to Dumka and further Deoghar as an express train (13045/46).

It operates as train number 13045 from Howrah to Deoghar and as train number 13046 in the reverse direction.

== Coach composition ==
The train has standard ICF coaches with a maximum speed of 110 km/h (68 mph). The rakes are maintained by Eastern Railways. The train consists of 13 coaches that includes:

- 9 Unreserved Chair Cars (8 General + 1 Ladies)
- 2 Second Sitting
- 1 3rd AC
- 2 Seating-cum-Luggage Vans

== Locomotive ==
The train is hauled by a Howrah-based WAP-7 or WAP-5 locomotive.

== Operation ==
13046 starts from Deoghar daily at 03:15 IST daily and reaches Howrah the same day at 11:35 IST.

13045 starts from Howrah daily at 16:25 IST and reaches Deoghar the next day at 00:35 IST.

== Speed ==
13045 has an average speed of 51 kmph and covers 418 km in 8 hours 10 minutes, while 13046 has an average speed of 50 kmph and covers 418 km in 8 hours 20 minutes. The maximum permissible speed of this train is 110 kmph between Bandel Junction and Andal Junction.

== Route and halts ==
Between Howrah and Deoghar, this train has 25 halts; the stations being:

- Bandel Junction
- Barddhaman Junction
- Mankar
- Panagarh
- Durgapur
- Waria
- Andal Junction
- Kajoragram
- Ukhra
- Pandabeswar
- Bhimgara Junction
- Panchra
- Dubrajpur
- Chinpai
- Kachujor
- Siuri
- Sainthia Junction
- Gadadharpur
- Mallarpur
- Rampurhat Junction
- Pinargaria
- Ambajora Shikaripara
- Dumka
- Basukinath
- Ghormara.

Note: Bold letters indicates Major Railway Stations/Major Cities.

== See also ==
- Howrah railway station
- Rampurhat Junction railway station
- Andal Junction railway station
- Sainthia Junction railway station
- Siuri railway station
- Dumka railway station
- Deoghar junction railway station
