= Suri, Birbhum =

Suri সিউড়ি
- City
- Siuri
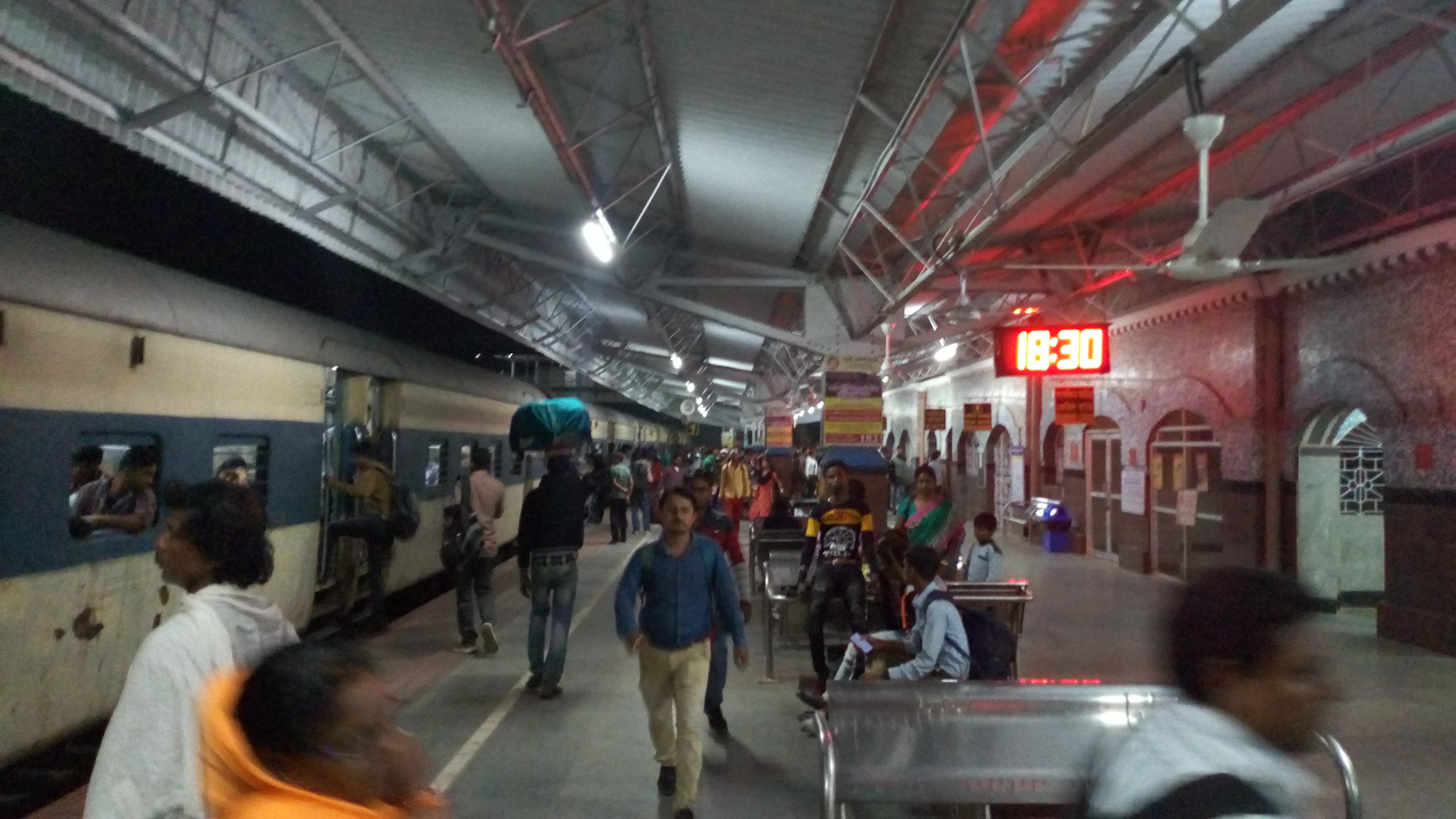
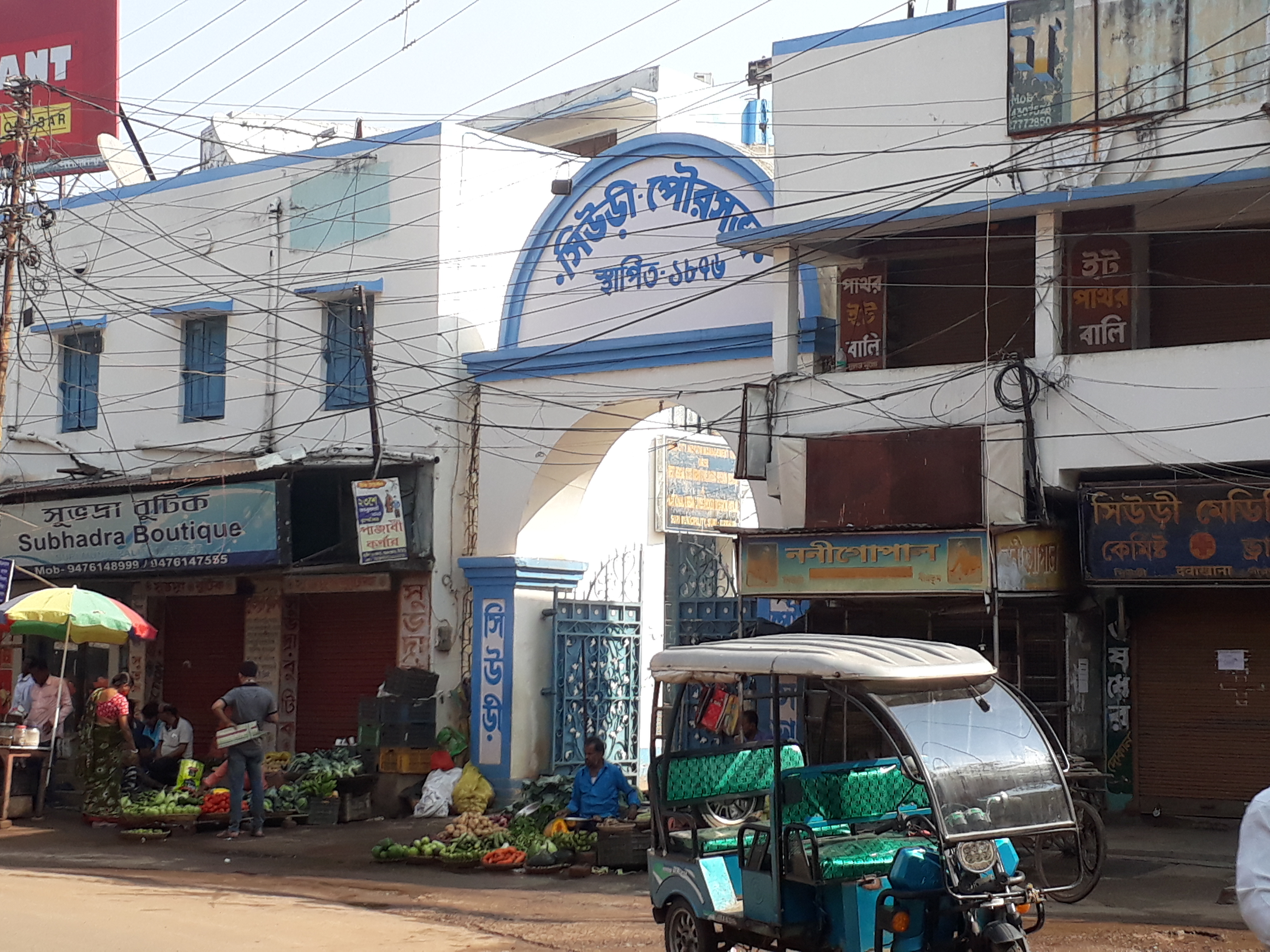
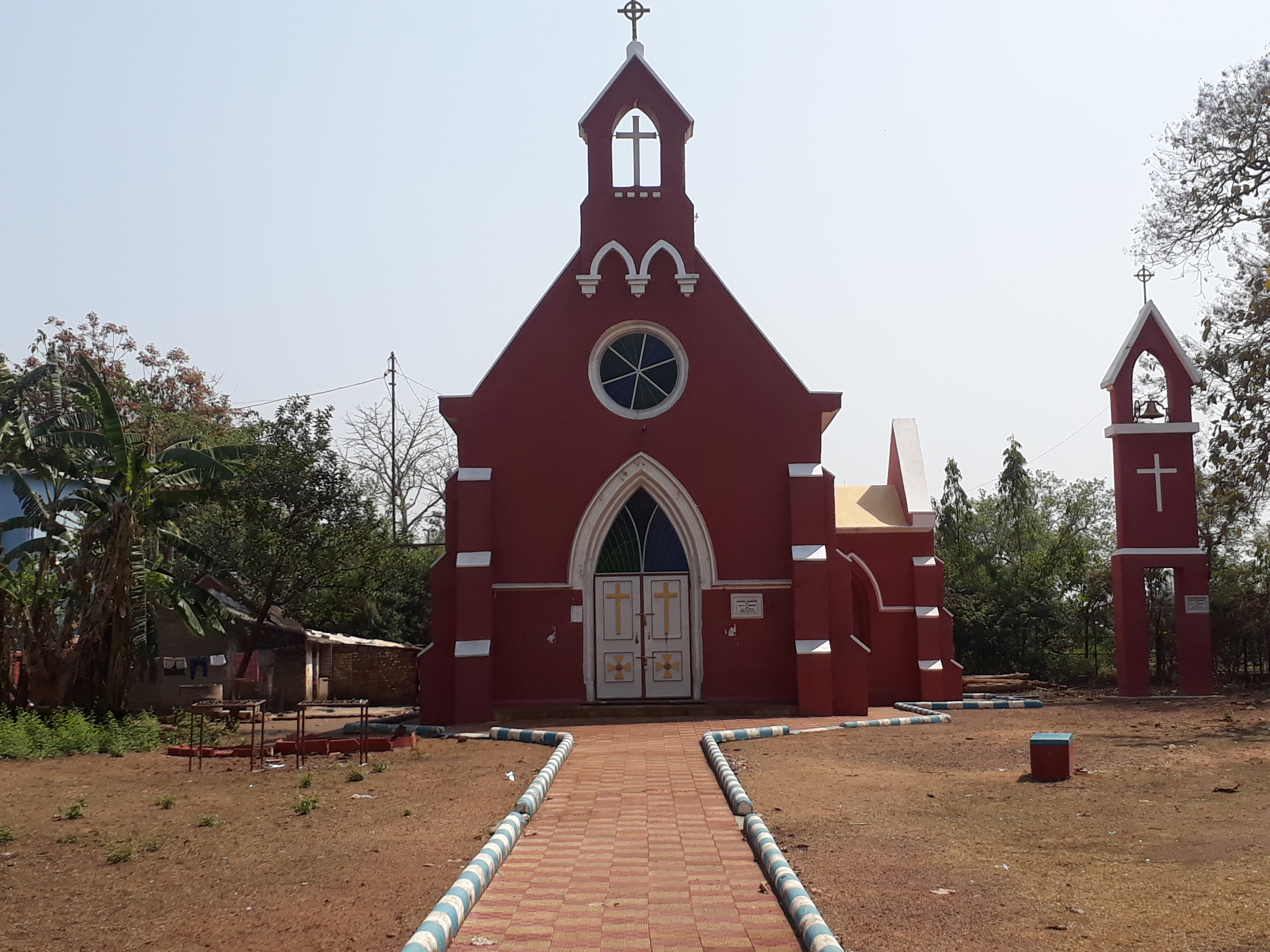
- Siuri railway station, Suri Municipality, Northern Evangelical Lutheran Church, Suri

- Location in West Bengal, India Suri (India) Suri (Asia)
- Coordinates: 23.910°N 87.527°E
- Country: India
- State: West Bengal
- District: Birbhum

Government
  - Type: Municipality
  - Body: Suri Municipality

Area
  - Total: 15.12 km^{2} (5.84 sq mi)
- Elevation: 71 m (233 ft)

Population (2022)
  - Total: 106,789
  - Density: 7,166/km^{2} (18,560/sq mi)

Languages
  - Official: Bengali
  - Additional official: English
- Time zone: UTC+5:30 (IST)
- PIN: 731101 (Suri main) 731102 (Hatjan Bazar) 731103 (Barabagan) 731126 (Karidhya)
- Telephone/STD code: +91 / 03462
- Vehicle registration: WB-54
- Lok Sabha constituency: Birbhum
- Vidhan Sabha constituency: Suri
- Website: birbhum.nic.in

Suri (/ˈsʊəri/) (also spelt as Siuri) is a city and a municipality in the Indian state of West Bengal. It is the headquarters of the Birbhum district. This city was established during the British Period (1876), makes it one of the oldest municipalities in the State.Suri is a rapidly growing municipality, makes it one the best suitable choices for living among the district people.Suri is the second largest and 2nd most Populous city in Birbhum District after Bolpur.Suri is the most densely populated city in the district. Located at the banks of Mayurakshi River and exactly in the centre of the district make this city an Political, cultural, commercial hub. Suri holds the record of biggest Kali Puja in the district and one of the largest Visarjan of West Bengal. This city is famous for its Murabba Sweet, which is originally came to Suri from Lucknow.

== Geography ==
Cities and towns in Suri Sadar subdivision of Birbhum district
M: municipal city/ town, CT: census town, R: rural/ urban centre, B: Barrage.
Owing to space constraints in the small map, the actual locations in a larger map may vary slightly

== Location ==
Suri is located at 23.910°N 87.527°E. Suri is 220 km from State capital Kolkata (Calcutta), 90 km from Durgapur, 34 km from Bolpur–Santiniketan, 55 km from Andal and 46 km from Rampurhat on the Andal–Sainthia branch line of Eastern Railway. It is on Panagarh–Morgram Highway.(known as N.H 60, now N.H 14). It has an average elevation of 71 metres (233 feet). It is situated on the extended part of Chota Nagpur Plateau. Tilpara barrage on Mayurakshi River is located 3 km north-west of Suri.

As per the District Census Handbook 2011, Suri covered an area of 9.47 km^{2}.

== History ==
Prior to the advent of the British in India and their acquisition of the territory of Bengal, Suri was but merely a small village. Yet, the British colonists preferred to choose Suri as the district headquarters of Birbhum, probably owing to convenience of transport and communication. Suri was well-connected to many places via road, however, it is not possible to tell about the conditions of those roads clearly. These roads can be traced in James Rennel's map of the 'Jungleterry District'(1779). After the defeat of Siraj ud-Daulah, the Nawab of Bengal, the British placed many puppet-kings in his place. When Mir Quasim was the Nawab, he ordered all the zamindars (landlords) to pay more revenue. At this, the ruler of Rajnagar, Asad Jama Khan disagreed. In December 1760, the army of the Nawab and the British marched together to attack Birbhum. Asad Jama Khan also got prepared with a cavalry of about 5,000 soldiers, and an infantry of nearly 20,000. In the battle, Asad Jama Khan was defeated and his zamindari was snatched. He took shelter amidst the very dense woods of Chotanagpur. There he had a clandestine meeting with a Maratha army general, Shivabhatta, and Shivabhatta joined him with a cavalry of two to three thousand soldiers as well as a large infantry. Another battle was fought near Kariddhya in 1763 in which he was defeated again. Thus, the British got the control of Suri. During the early years of the British rule, Bishnupur and Birbhum was administered from Murshidabad. Then, a new district was formed joining Birbhum and Bishnupur, and Suri was made the headquarters. The term "Suri" came from the people who lived here. In bengali"Suri" denotes the people who make alcohol, thus the name. During this time, British officials used the name '(Laat) Hydrabad', the name Suri was also used, but only later. G.R. Foley was the first District Collector of Birbhum. He was appointed in 1786. Then, J. Sherburne became the collector and after him, Christopher Keating became the collector. Suri Municipality started functioning from 1876. Then, the population of Suri was no more than 7,000. The first Chairman of the municipality was A.A. Owen. Rail transport arrived in Suri in 1913 when the first train started on the route Andal–Sainthia.

== Economics ==
The chief industries of Suri include rice milling, cotton and silk weaving, and furniture manufacture.

In March 2008, a private Kolkata-based firm, Ramsarup Group, unveiled a proposal for large-scale investment in a greenfield power plant and cement manufacturing plant worth Rs 2200 crores (US$550 million) was submitted to the Government of West Bengal. Bakreshwar Thermal Power Plant is around 12 kilometres away from Suri town.

== Demographics ==
Population of Suri
Year	Pop.	±%
1901	8,692	—
1911	9,131	+5.1%
1921	8,915	−2.4%
1931	10,908	+22.4%
1941	15,867	+45.5%
1951	18,135	+14.3%
1961	22,841	+25.9%
1971	30,110	+31.8%
1981	40,783	+35.4%
1991	54,298	+33.1%
2001	61,806	+13.8%
2011	67,864	+9.8%
2022	106,789	+57.4%
Source: District Census Handbook Birbhum, Census of India 2011, Series 20, Part XII A

As of 2011 Indian Census, Suri had a total population of 1,06,789, of which 54,589 were males and 52,200 were females. The sex ratio in Suri is 963. Population within the age group of 0 to 6 years was 8,935. The total number of literates in Suri was 94,348, which constituted 88.3% of the population with male literacy of 92.8% and female literacy of 85.7%. The effective literacy rate of 7+ population of Suri was 92.9%, of which male literacy rate was 94.8% and female literacy rate was 89.9%. The Scheduled Castes and Scheduled Tribes population was 28,857 and 927 respectively. Suri had 25385 households in 2011.

== Transport ==
Suri has a well organized road transport system with both Govt. Bus Service (SBSTC, NBSTC & WBTC) and private bus service. The town is well connected to major towns and cities like - Kolkata, Durgapur, Asansol, Purulia, Bankura, Medinipur, Digha, Massanjore, Rampurhat, Bolpur, Burdwan, English Bazar, Jalpaiguri, Siliguri, Katwa, Balurghat, Raiganj etc. through roadway.

Siuri is a model Railway Station. It is situated at the southern part of the town, at Hatjan Bazar. It connects Suri directly with places like Howrah, Kolkata, Bardhaman, Durgapur, Guwahati, Rampurhat, Malda, Siliguri, Puri, Chennai, Surat, Jhajha, Asansol, Ranchi Nagpur, Bilaspur, Bhubaneswar, Visakhapatnam, Dimapur, Jamshedpur, Purulia, Cuttack, Vijayawada, Raipur, Durg etc. Some of the important trains that run via Siuri are,

- Vananchal Express
- Surat–Malda Town Express
- Ranchi–Kamakhya Express
- Puri-Kamakhya Express (via Adra)
- Mayurakshi Fast Passenger
- Nagaon Express
- Dibrugarh–Tambaram Express
- Hool Express
- Siuri-Sealdah Memu Express

== Language ==
Principal language of communication is Bengali, Hindi and English.

== Education ==
=== Colleges ===
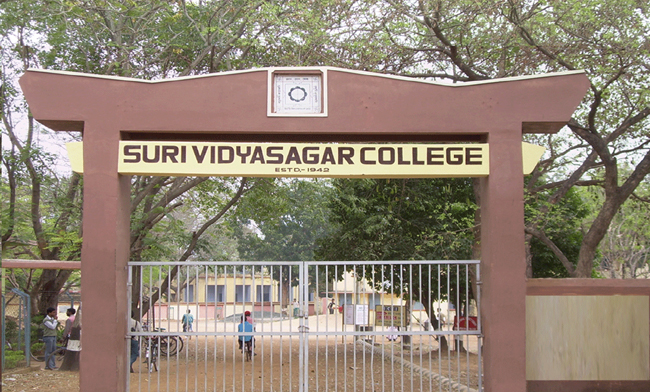
Suri Vidyasagar College main entrance

- Suri Vidyasagar College
- Birbhum Mahavidyalaya.
- Birbhum Institute of Engineering & Technology
- Sri Ramakrishna Shilpa Vidyapith, also known as "L. C. College"

There few Diploma Technical Colleges (private), D.ED. Colleges and B.ED. colleges situated at Suri. Satsang Mission Medical College, Hospital & Cancer Research Institute is expected to be completed in the next 3 years.

=== Schools ===
- Total 18 Higher Secondary Schools including Birbhum Zilla School, U.P. Public School, Levelfield School, are there. Others schools are R.T. Girls' High School (established-1884 as River Thompson Girls' High School, Suri Public and Chandragati Mustafi Memorial High School, Suri Benimadhab Institution (established-1917), Kaligati Smriti Narishiksha Niketan, Suri Ramkrishna Vidyapeeth and Muuk-Badhir Vidyalaya (Deaf and Dumb School, established-1936).

== Libraries ==
The first library set up in Suri was the library of Birbhum Zilla School (established-1851). Then, "Ratan Library" was set up by Sibratan Mitra, The Ramaranjan Town Hall and Public Library was set up in 1900. The District Library of Birbhum (established-1955), set up during the implementation of the first five-year plan, stands beside the Vivekanada Library and Ramaranjan Town hall.

== Civil Administration ==
Suri municipality is ninth oldest municipality of West bengal after that of Kolkata, Uttarpara, Shantipur, Howrah, Krishnanagar, Burdwan, Basirhat, and Berhampore. It is divided into 21 wards. It was controlled by the Indian National Congress-Trinamool Congress alliance. In the 2010 municipal elections, the municipality faced a hung verdict. Later, the Trinamool Congress with 8 councillors, formed the municipal board by taking the support of 6 Congress councillors. In municipal elections of 2015, TMC won 15 seats, INC won 3 seats, and BJP got 1 seat. Municipal Election 2021 Trinamool Congress won all 21 wards.

== Local specialities ==
Suri is famous for a special sweetmeat called Murabba & Achar (fruits/vegetables preserved in sugar syrup) comes in a wide number of varieties, which includes Murabba of Satamooli.

== Places of worship ==
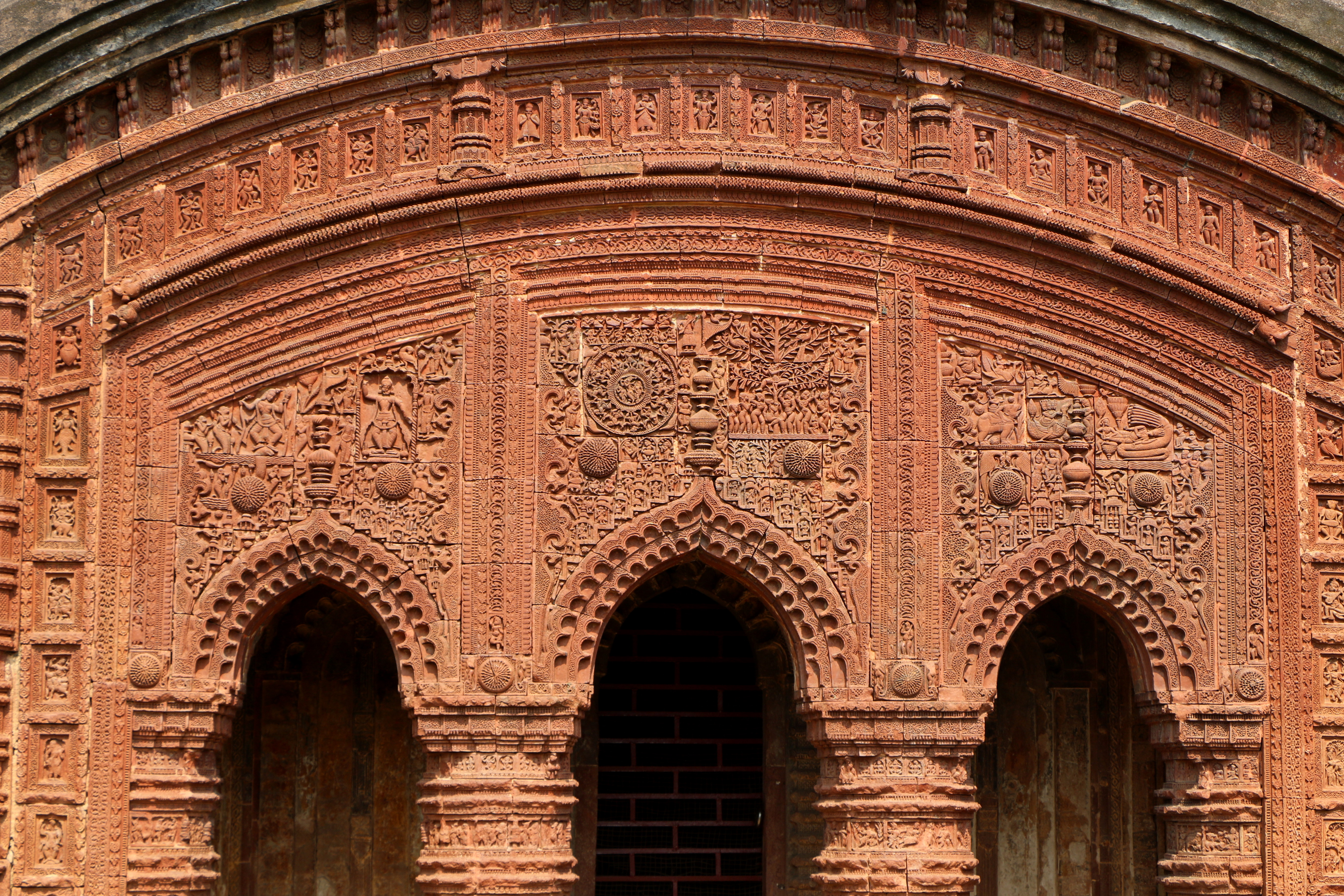
Terracota panels. Click on the pic to see more details of the carvings.

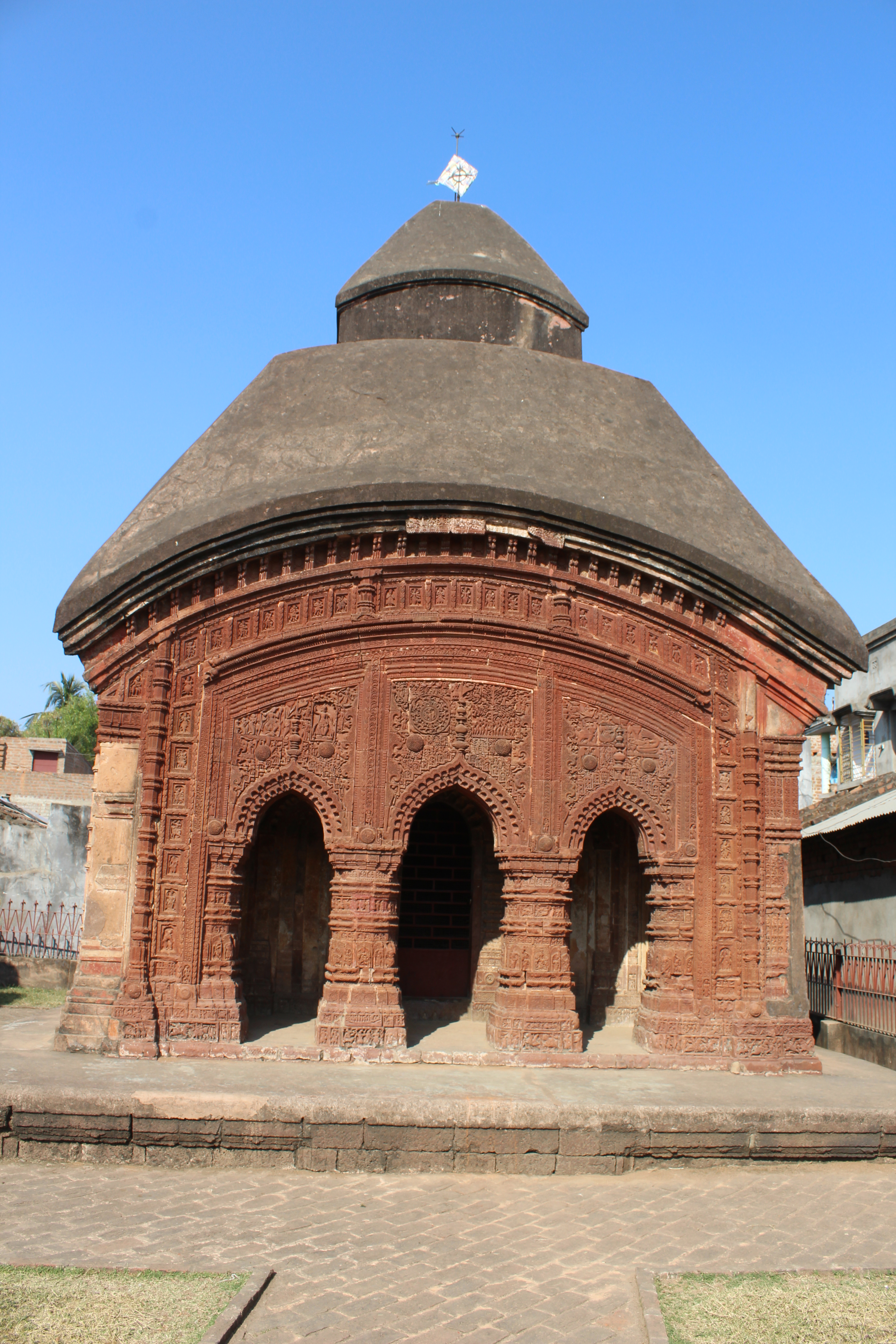
Radha Damodar temple at Sonatopara in Suri

"Serious scholars of terracotta have accepted Birbhum as the place where some of the finest terracotta temples of Bengal are found… the oldest and the finest temple — known as Radha Damodar temple — is in Suri town. It's a majestic aatchala dedicated to Damodar, the other name of Shiva."

David J. McCutchion mentions the aatchala Radha-Shyam temple built in the 17-18th century, brick-built with phulpathar facades richly carved.

Suri is one of those places where religious harmony is found.

Some famous temples are situated in Suri. Moumachhi Club has established a Kali temple in Suri, which is unique and grand in this town. Other famous temples are Bamni Kalibari, Bhabatarini Kalibari, Dangalpara Anandapur Sarbajanin Matrimandir and Shib Mandir, Radha Ballav Mandir, Shani Mandir, Damodar Mandir, Rabindrapalli Kalibari, Rakshakali Temple, Kendua Dakshin Para Kali Mandir.

Durga temple of Chattoraj family is a very old and heritage temple of the town. it is situated at Seharapara. A lot of people visit this temple during the Durga Puja. The newly established Shiv Mandir attracts many people of the area. People will love to experience the rituals of the traditional Durga Puja.

Singha Bahini Mandir, situated in Barui-Para is another very old temple which attracts many devotees every day. The traditional-style Durga puja and Kali puja at the Singha Bahini Mandir is also enjoyed by the devotees.

There are a few mosques in Suri and among them, the Masjid at Masjid More and the one at Madrasa Road deserve special mention. Suri is famous for Dargah of Hazrat Data Mehboob Shah. Dargah is flocked by thousands of devotees every day.

There are three churches in this town. The oldest one is Northern Evangelical Lutheran Church, Suri situated near Lalkuthipara in Suri.

== Festivals ==
Every year Suri holds the 'Barobagan Mela,' inaugurated by the Governor of Bengal Lord Brabourne. Multiple religious festivals like Durga Puja, Laxmi Puja, Kali Puja, Diwali, Jagaddhatri Puja, Janmashtami, Eid, Muharram, or Christmas are also celebrated. Book-fairs are held every 3–4 years. 'Suri Utsav', an alternative attempt to the famous 'Barobagan Mela,' began in 2023-24.

== Climate ==
The climate of the district is generally dry, mild and healthy. The hot weather usually lasts from the middle of March to the middle of the June, the rainy season from the middle of June to the middle of October, and the cold weather from middle of October to the middle of March. They do not always correspond to these limit. The wind is from the south-east in the summer and from the north-west in the winter. The minimum and maximum temperature data for Suri is given below - For the Year 2011 (in degree Celsius)-

Month	Maximum temperature	Minimum temperature
January	29	6
February	35	11
March	40	12
April	39	19
May	38	20
June	39	24
July	36	23
August	37	24
September	36	23
October	34	16
November	32	14
December	30	7
Yearly	40	6

For the year 2012 (in degree Celsius)-

Month	Maximum temperature	Minimum temperature
January	28	7
February	35	8
March	40	13
April	41	19
May	45	22
June	48	24
July	38	24
August	35	24
September	...	...
October	35	16
November	32	11
December	30	7
Yearly	46	7

The average precipitation in Suri is 1307 mm (130.7 cm). It is the lowest in December with an average of 3 mm, while it is the highest in August (299 mm) and in July(297 mm). The average annual temperature is 26.2 °C.

Month	January	February	March	April	May	June	July	August	September	October	November	December
Rainfall (in mm)	17	14	19	27	66	217	297	299	224	111	13	3
Avg. maximum	25.8	28.5	34.3	38.2	37.0	35.2	32.1	31.9	32.3	31.7	29.2	26.2
Avg. minimum	11.6	14.1	19.0	23.5	25.6	26.1	25.6	25.6	25.3	22.6	16.6	12.5
Daily mean	18.7	21.3	26.6	30.8	31.3	30.6	28.8	28.7	28.8	27.1	22.9	19.3

== See also ==
- Rampurhat
- Bolpur
- Asansol
- Durgapur
- Basirhat
- Barrackpore
