= Siuri railway station =

Railway station in West Bengal, India

Siuri
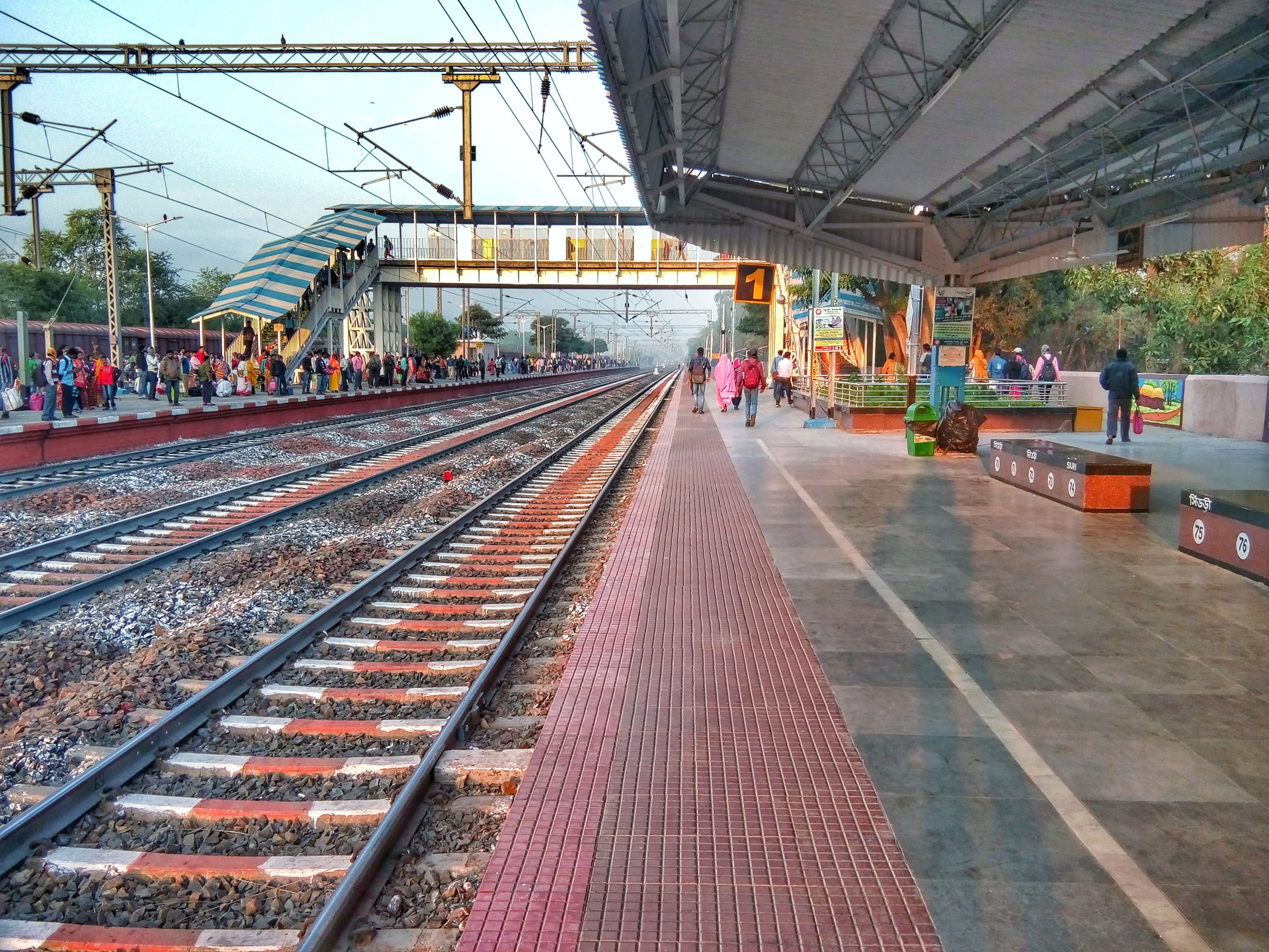
- Siuri railway station

General information
- Location: Hatjan Bazar, Suri, West Bengal; India
- Coordinates: 23.890301°N 87.531016°E
- System: Train station
- Owner: Indian Railways
- Operator: Eastern Railways
- Line: Andal–Sainthia branch line
- Platforms: 3
- Tracks: 5

Construction
- Structure type: At grade
- Parking: Available
- Cycle facilities: Available

Other information
- Status: Functioning
- Station code: SURI
- Zone(s): Eastern Railway
- Division(s): Asansol
- Classification: NSG-5

History
- Opened: 1913
- Electrified: 2016

Services
Preceding station	Indian Railways	Following station
Kachujor towards Andal Junction	Eastern Railway zone Andal–Sainthia branch line	Kunuri towards Sainthia Junction
Location
- Location within West Bengal Location within India

Siuri railway station (Station Code- SURI) is one of the major railway stations on Andal–Sainthia branch line under Asansol railway division. It serves Suri, the district headquarters of Birbhum district in the Indian state of West Bengal, and the adjoining villages. The railway station is owned by Indian Railways and operated by Eastern Railway. A total number of 24 trains runs via Siuri. Two trains terminates at Siuri and 2 trains originate from Siuri. Annual revenue of Siuri railway station is about 4.62 crore Rupees in the year(FY) 2023-24, and 5.06 crore in the year 2024-25(FY) Which is 4th highest in terms of ticket sale in the district. This makes Siuri railway station the 4th busiest railway station in Birbhum district.

Some of the use comes from pilgrims and travelers visiting Bakreshwar Temple and hot springs in the village of Bakreshwar and Data Babar Mazaar (the Dargah of Data Saheb) in the village of Patharchapuri use this station. Siuri station has been classified as an NSG-5 category station.

== History ==
Construction of the Andal–Sainthia section was completed in 1913. Construction of the Siuri railway station was done as part of building the entire line and that was the start of the Siuri railway station that year. Electrification work of this line was completed in 2016.

== Location ==
Siuri station is situated at Hatjan Bazar area in the southern part of Suri town, the District Headquarters of Birbhum district in the state of West Bengal in India. It is an important station on Andal–Sainthia branch line. Coming from Andal Junction railway station, the previous station of Siuri is Kachujor railway station and the next station of Siuri is Kunuri railway station

== Amenities ==
Siuri is a Model Railway station. Ticket counters for both reserved and un-reserved tickets are available here. Sheds, seats, drinking water, pay and use toilets, foot overbridge, digital clock etc. are available on the platforms. Separate waiting rooms for first and second class passengers are available here. Parking area is also provided in outside of the station building.

== Important trains ==
Some of the important trains that runs via Siuri are,

- Vananchal Express
- Surat–Malda Town Express
- Ranchi–Kamakhya Express
- Puri–Kamakhya Weekly Express (via Adra)
- Mayurakshi Fast Passenger
- Nagaon Express
- Dibrugarh–Tambaram Express
- Hool Express
- Siuri-Sealdah MEMU Exp
- Digha-Malda Town Express
- Kamakhya–SMVT Bengaluru AC Superfast Express
- MGR Chennai Central – New Jalpaiguri Superfast Express
- New Tinsukia-Tambaram Express

== Service ==
Through Mail/Express and Passenger trains, this station connects Suri, the District Headquarters of Birbhum district with various places like Howrah, Kolkata, Bardhaman, Durgapur, Guwahati, Dibrugarh, Malda, Siliguri, Puri, Chennai, Surat, Jhajha, Asansol, Ranchi, Nagpur, Bilaspur, Bhubaneswar, Visakhapatnam, Dimapur, Jamshedpur, Purulia, Cuttack, Vijayawada, Raipur, Durg. Apart from Suri, people of surrounding areas like Rajnagar, Mohammad Bazar, Purandarpur, also use this station due to its proximity. Moreover, pilgrims and travelers visiting Bakreshwar Temple and hot springs in the village of Bakreshwar and Data Babar Mazaar (the Dargah of Data Saheb) in the village of Patharchapuri use this station. ThePrantik-Siuri railway line, the Siuri-Jamtara line, and Siuri-Ahmadpur-Katwa Link lines are all in high demand.

== Gallery ==
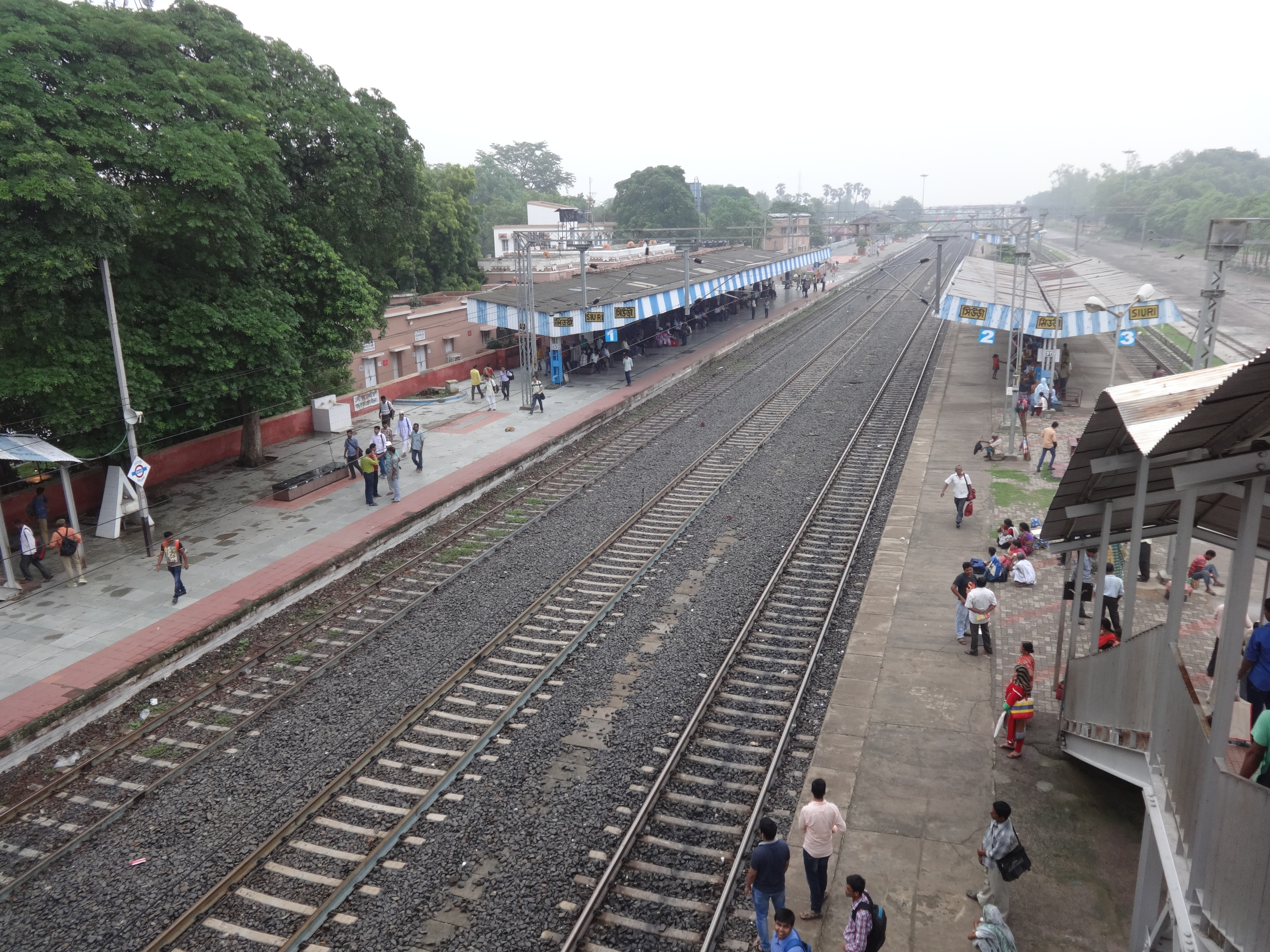
An old picture of Siuri railway station

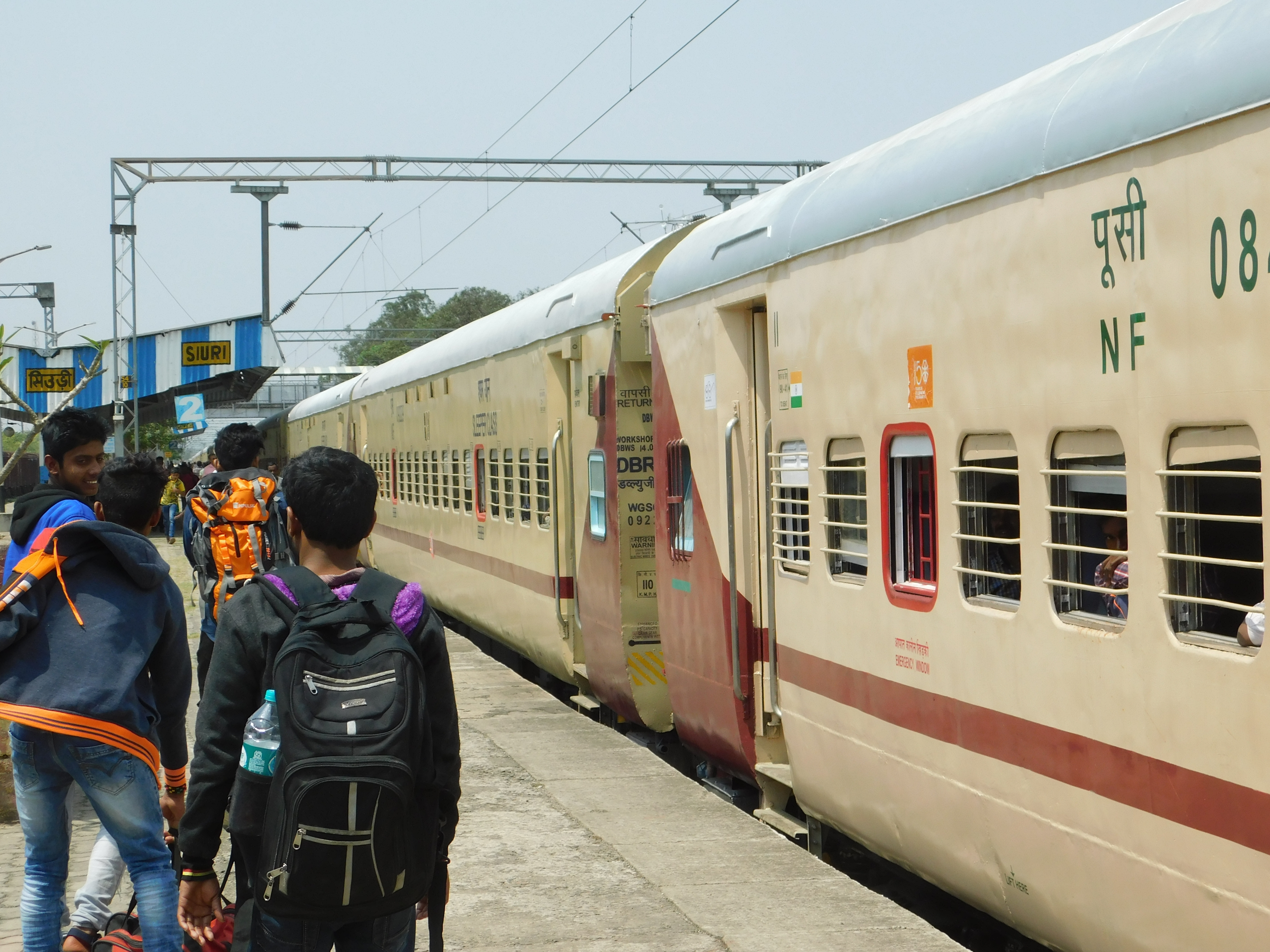
15640 DN Puri–Kamakhya Weekly Express (via Adra) standing on platform no. 2 of Siuri railway station

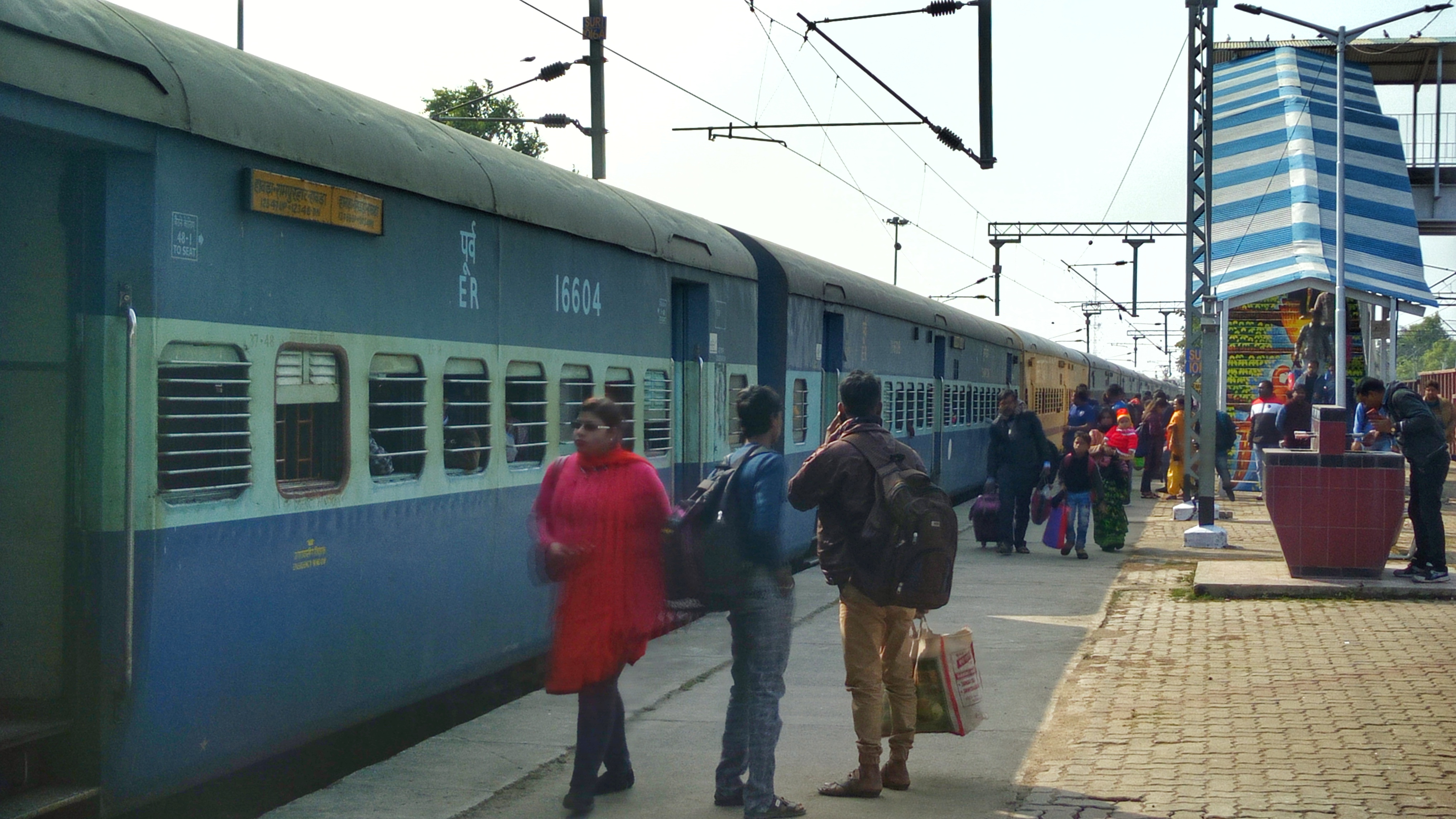
22322 DN Hool Express standing on platform no. 3 of Siuri railway station

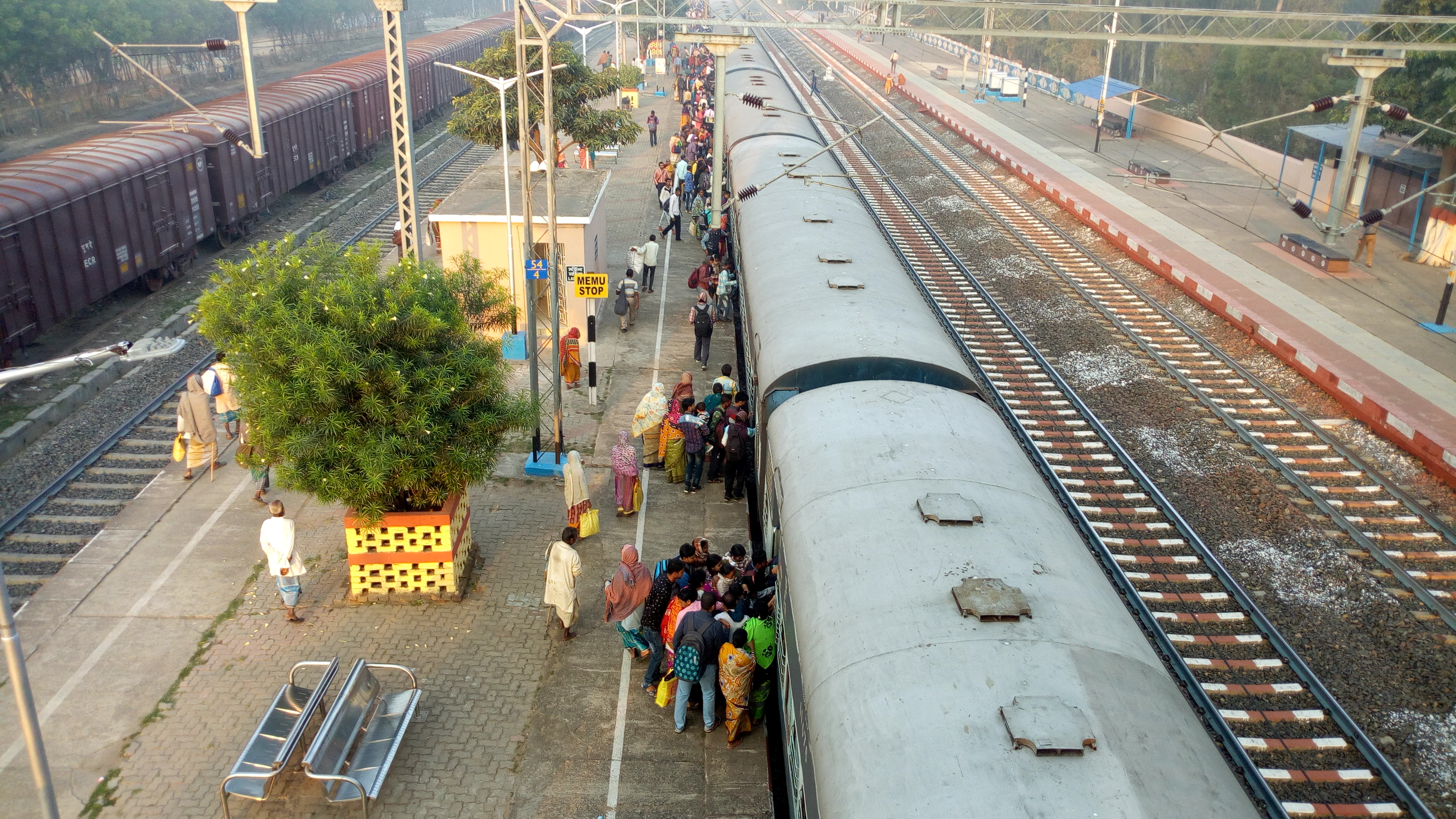
53046 Down Mayurakshi Fast Passenger at Siuri railway station

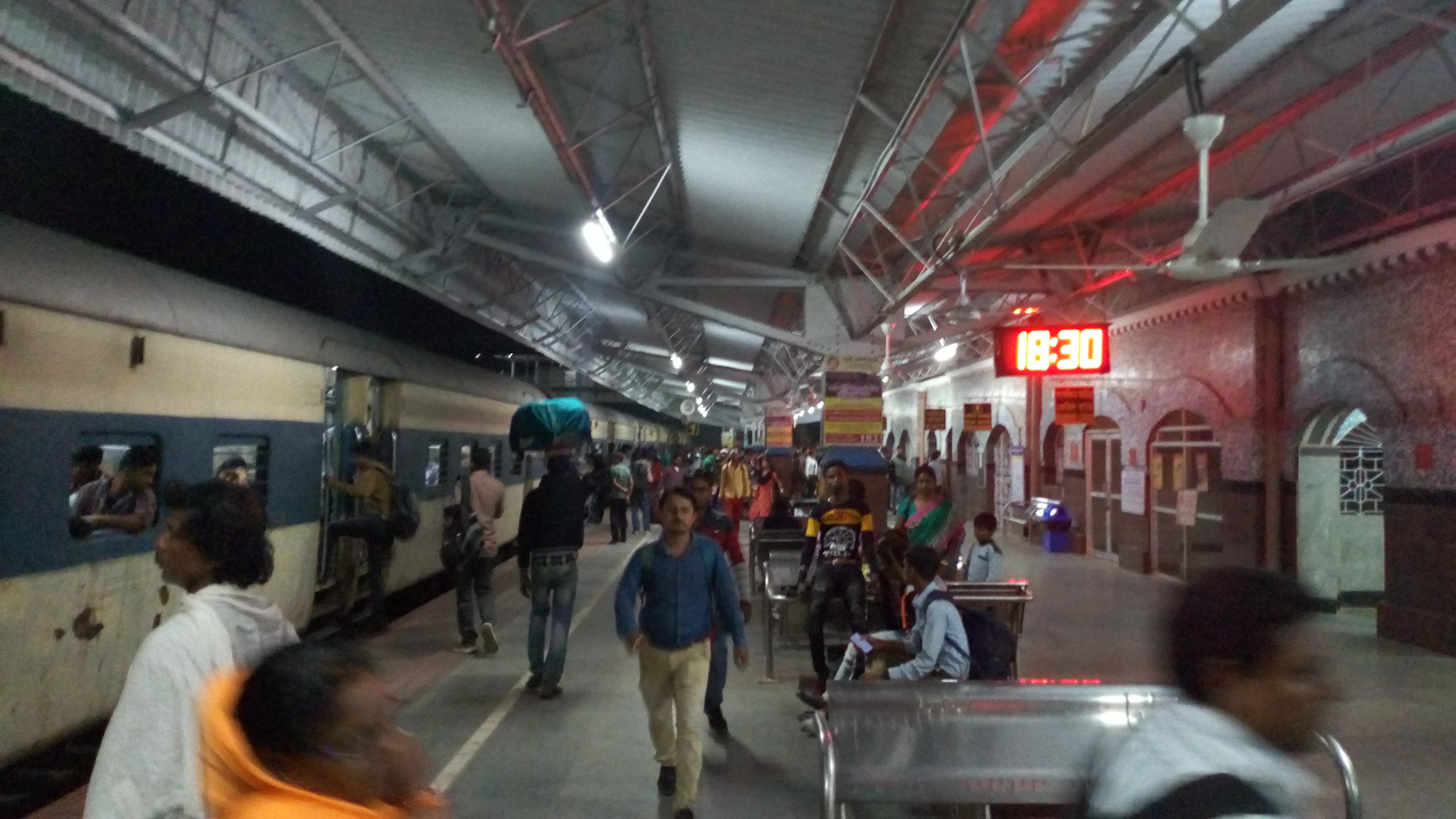
Up Andal–Sainthia MEMU at Siuri

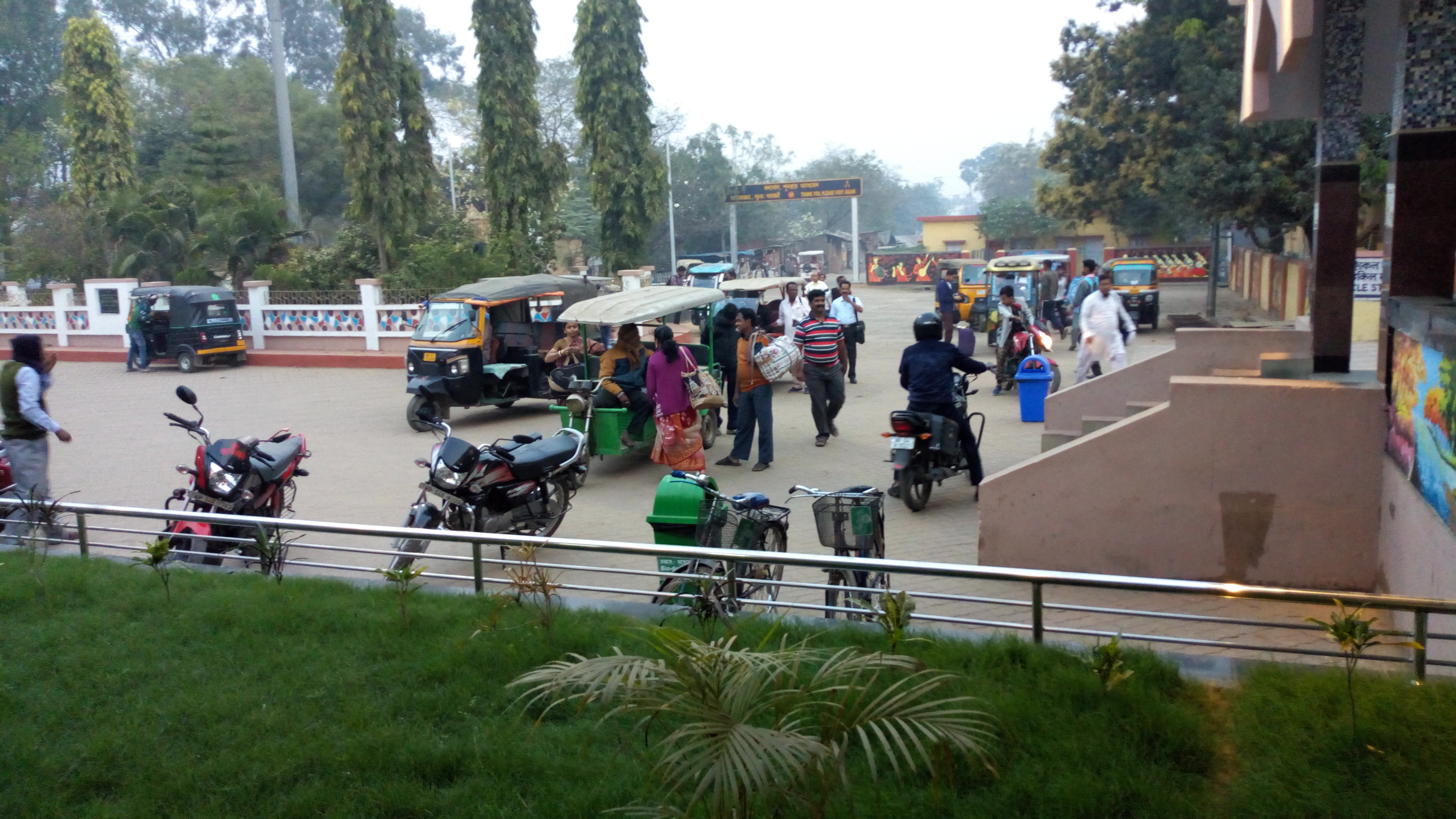
Siuri station – Circulating area

== See also ==
- Suri town
- Hool Express
