= Hool Express =

Train in India

Overview
- Service type: Superfast
- First service: 30 June 2007; 18 years ago
- Current operator: Eastern Railways

Route
- Termini: Howrah (HWH); Siuri (SURI)
- Stops: 8
- Distance travelled: 242 km (150 mi)
- Average journey time: 4h 20m
- Service frequency: Daily
- Train number: 22321 / 22322

On-board services
- Classes: AC Chair car, Reserved Chair car, General Unreserved
- Seating arrangements: Yes
- Sleeping arrangements: No
- Baggage facilities: Below the seats

Technical
- Rolling stock: ICF coach
- Track gauge: 1,676 mm (5 ft 6 in)
- Operating speed: 56 km/h (35 mph) average including halts
Route map
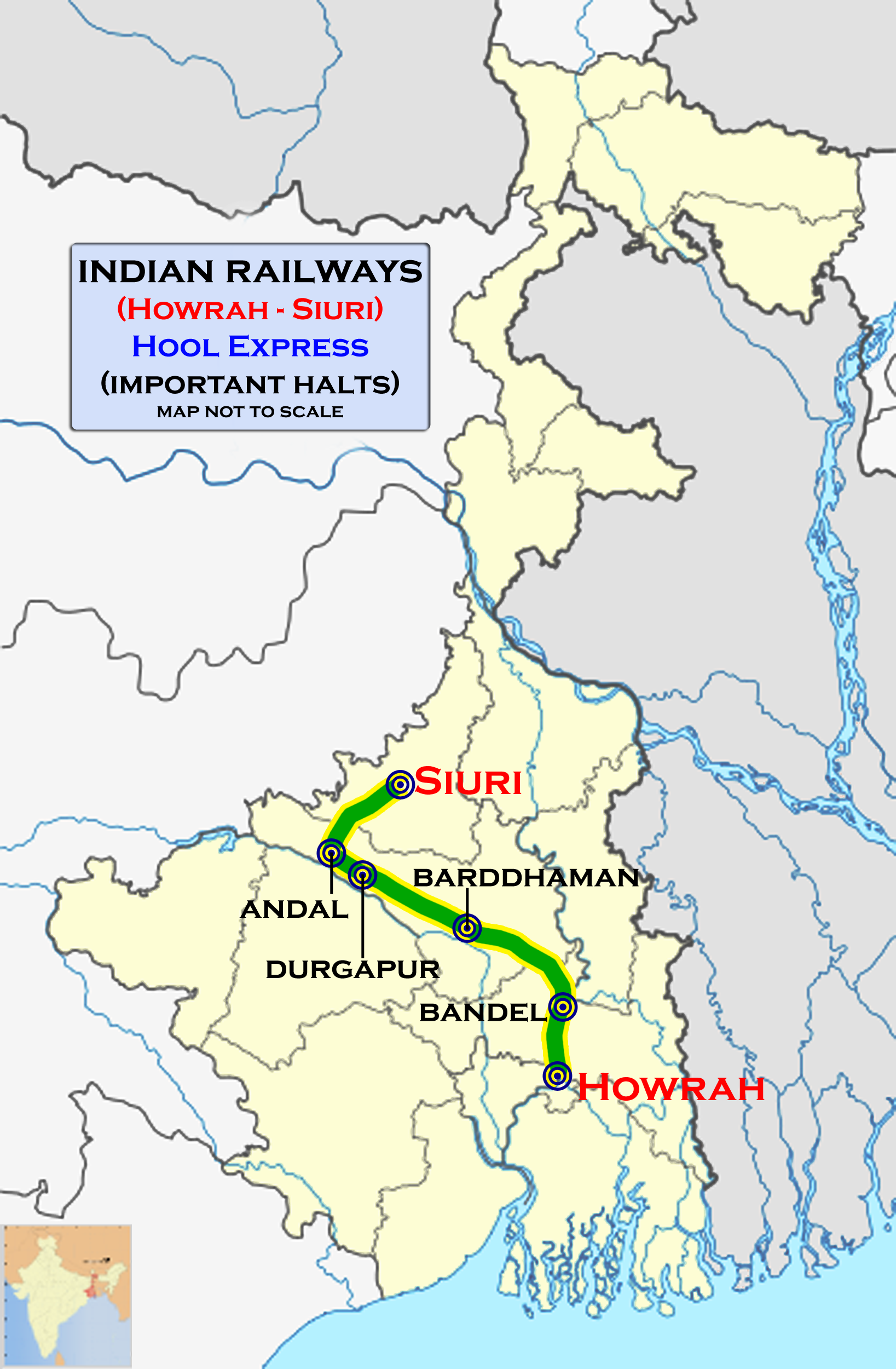

The 22321 / 22322 Hool Express is a daily Superfast Express train run by Eastern Railway, which connects Siuri and Howrah. It has been upgraded from regular Express with number combination of 13051/13052. It is now running as a Superfast train with a number combination of 22321/22322.

Passengers are charged Superfast charge accordingly from October 1, 2016. This train was inaugurated on July 30, 2007.

== Speed ==
The 22321/22322 Howrah–Siuri Hool Express has an average speed of 56 kmph and covers 242 km in 4h 20m on both sides. The maximum permissible speed of Hool Express is 110 kmph between Bandel Junction and Andal Junction.

== Route and halts ==
Between Howrah Junction and Siuri, this train stops at:

- Bandel Junction
- Barddhaman Junction
- Panagarh
- Durgapur
- Andal Junction
- Ukhra
- Pandabeswar
- Dubrajpur

== Coach composition ==
The train has standard ICF rakes which its maintained by Eastern Railway with max speed of 110 kmph. The train consists of 14 coaches:

- 1 AC Chair Car
- 1 AC 3-Tier
- 2 Second Sitting
- 8 General Unreserved
- 2 Luggage / Parcel Van

== Locomotive ==
It is hauled by a Howrah-based WAP-4 / WAP-5 / WAP-7 locomotive from Howrah to Siuri, and vice versa.

== Rake sharing ==
Earlier, the train used to share its rake with 13017/13018 Ganadevata Express. As of now, the train has its own single dedicated rake.

== Operation ==
22321 – Starts from Howrah Junction at 6:45 AM IST daily and reaches Siuri the same day at 11:05 AM IST

22322 – Starts from Siuri daily at 1:40 PM IST and reaches Howrah Junction the same day at 6:00 PM IST

== See also ==
- Howrah Junction railway station
- Siuri railway station
- Ganadevata Express
- Suri
