= Siduli railway station =

Railway station in West Bengal, India

General information
- Location: Khandra-Siduli Road, Siduli, Paschim Bardhaman district, West Bengal; India
- Coordinates: 23°23′09″N 87°07′28″E
- Elevation: 106 metres (348 ft)
- System: Indian Railways
- Owner: Indian Railways
- Operator: Eastern Railway
- Lines: Andal–Sainthia branch line Sahibganj loop
- Platforms: 2
- Tracks: 2

Construction
- Structure type: Standard (on ground station)

Other information
- Status: Functioning
- Station code: SXD
- Division(s): Asansol

History
- Opened: 1913
- Electrified: 2010–11
- Former names: East Indian Railway Company

Services
| Preceding station | Indian Railways | Following station |
|---|---|---|
| Kajoragram towards Andal Junction | Eastern Railway zone Andal–Sainthia branch line | Ukhra towards Sainthia Junction |
Location

Siduli railway station is a railway station of Andal–Sainthia branch line of the Asansol railway division connecting from Andal to Sainthia on the Sahibganj loop line. This is under the jurisdiction of Eastern Railway zone of Indian Railways. It is situated beside Khandra-Siduli Road at Siduli, Paschim Bardhaman district in the Indian state of West Bengal.

== History ==
The Andal–Sainthia branch line was built in 1913. Electrification of Andal–Pandabeshwar section including Siduli railway station was completed in 2010–11 and Pandabeshwar-Saithia route was completed in 2016.
