= Nagaon Express =

Train in the Northeast Frontier Railway zone, India

Overview
- Service type: Express
- Status: Operating
- Current operator: Northeast Frontier Railway

Route
- Termini: Silghat Town (SHTT); Tambaram (TBM)
- Stops: 47
- Distance travelled: 2969 km
- Average journey time: 60 hours
- Service frequency: Weekly
- Train number: 15629/15630

On-board services
- Classes: AC 2 Tier (2A), AC 3 Tier (3A), Sleeper (SL)
- Seating arrangements: Available
- Catering facilities: Available
- Baggage facilities: Available

Technical
- Rolling stock: LHB coach
- Track gauge: Broad gauge
- Operating speed: 51 km/h
Route map
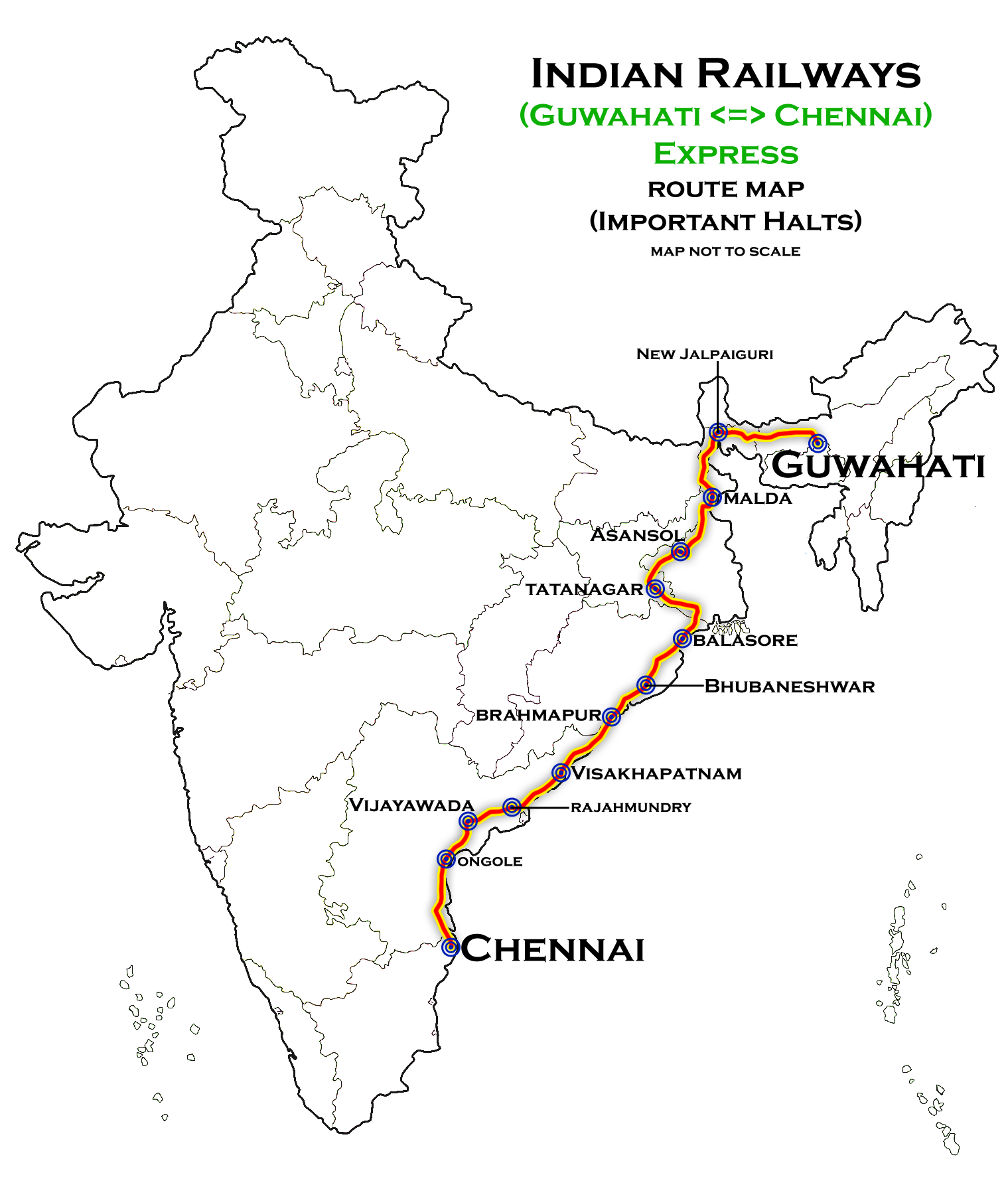

Nagaon Express (earlier Tambaram–Silghat Town Express), is a weekly Express train belonging to Northeast Frontier Railway zone of Indian Railways that connects Silghat Town of Assam and Chennai Tambaram in the South Indian metropolis of Chennai, Tamil Nadu via New Jalpaiguri , Malda Town , Rampurhat , Asansol. The train was extended to Tambaram on a trial basis from August 2017. The train was also extended from Guwahati to Silghat Town.

== Time-table ==
Train No. 15629 from Tambaram to Silghat Town.
The train leaves Tambaram (TBM) on every Monday at 9:45 P.M. and arrives Silghat Town (SHTT) on Thursday at 9:45 A.M. traversing a distance of 2965 kilometers in 60 hours.

Train no. 15630 from Silghat Town to Tambaram.
The train leaves Silghat Town (SHTT) on every Friday at 8:30 A.M. and arrives Tambaram (TBM) on Sunday at 20:50 P.M. traversing a distance of 2965 kilometres in 60 hours & 20 minutes.

== Major halts ==
The train travels the total distance of 2798 kilometres in 55 hours. The major halts of this train are as follows-

TAMIL NADU (02 stops)

1. Tambaram (Starts)
2. Chennai Egmore.

ANDHRA PRADESH (06 stops)

1. Nellore
2. Ongole
3. Vijayawada
4. Eluru
5. Rajahmundry
6. Visakhapatnam.

ODISHA (05 stops)

1. Brahmapur
2. Khurda Road
3. Bhubaneswar
4. Cuttack
5. Balasore.

WEST BENGAL (17 stops)

1. Hijli
2. Purulia
3. Joychandi Pahar
4. Burnpur
5. Asansol Junction
6. Andal
7. Durgapur
8. Siuri
9. Rampurhat Junction
10. New Farakka
11. Malda Town
12. Dalkhola
13. New Jalpaiguri (Siliguri)
14. New Maynaguri
15. Dhupguri
16. New Cooch Behar
17. New Alipurduar.

JHARKHAND (02 stops)

1. Pakur
2. Tatanagar.

BIHAR (02 stops)

1. Barsoi
2. Kishanganj.

ASSAM (12 stops)

1. Fakiragram
2. Kokrajhar
3. New Bongaigaon
4. Bijni
5. Rangiya
6. Kamakhya
7. Guwahati
8. Jagiroad
9. Chaparmukh
10. Nagaon
11. Jakhalabandha
12. Silghat (Ends).

Note: Bold letters indicates Major Railway Stations/Major Cities.

== Traction ==
The train is hauled by WAP-7 Locomotive of Electric Loco Shed, Erode from Tambaram to Visakhapatnam.

From Visakhapatnam to Durgapur, the train is hauled by WAP-7 locomotive of Electric Loco Shed, Visakhapatnam.

Finally from Durgapur to Silghat Town the train is hauled by WAP-4 Locomotive of Electric Loco Shed, Howrah and vice versa.

== Major bridges ==
The train passes over some important rivers of India:

1. Creek in Ennore near Chennai
2. Penna river in Nellore
3. Paleru river in Ongole
4. Krishna River in Vijayawada
5. Godavari River in Rajamahendravaram
6. Nagavali River in Srikakulam
7. Vamsadhara River in Srikakulam
8. Rushikulya River in Ganjam
9. Mahanadi river in Cuttack
10. Kathjori river (Mahanadi distributary) in Cuttack
11. Kuakhai River (Mahanadi distributary) near Barang
12. Birupa River (Mahanadi distributary) near Kendrapara
13. Brahmani River in Jenapur
14. Baitarani River in Jajpur Keonjhar Rd.
15. Budhabalanga River in Balasore
16. Subarnarekha River near Jaleswar
17. Kangsabati River near Kharagpur
18. Dwarakeswar River near Bankura
19. Damodar River near Asansol
20. Mayurakshi River near Sainthia
21. Ganges via Farakka Barrage in Farakka
22. Mahananda River near Dumdangi
23. Teesta River near Jalpaiguri
24. Jaldhaka River near Altagram
25. Torsa river near Ghoksadanga
26. Tipkai River near Chautara
27. Gaurang River at Kokrajhar
28. Champabati River near Bongaigaon
29. Manas River near Bongaigaon
30. Beki River at Barpeta Road
31. Baralia River near Rangiya
32. Saraighat Bridge over Brahmaputra near Kamakhya

== See also ==
- Dibrugarh–Tambaram Express
- Chennai–New Jalpaiguri SF Express
- Guwahati–Bengaluru Cantt. Superfast Express
- Thiruvananthapuram–Silchar Superfast Express
- New Tinsukia–Bengaluru Express
