= Mahishadahari railway station =

Railway station in West Bengal, India

General information
- Location: Mahishadahari, Sainthia, Birbhum district, West Bengal; India
- Coordinates: 23°32′45″N 87°23′09″E
- Elevation: 59 metres (194 ft)
- System: Indian Railways
- Owner: Indian Railways
- Operator: Eastern Railway
- Lines: Andal–Sainthia branch line Sahibganj loop
- Platforms: 2
- Tracks: 2

Construction
- Structure type: Standard (on ground station)

Other information
- Status: Functioning
- Station code: MWZ
- Division(s): Asansol

History
- Opened: 1913
- Electrified: 2012–16
- Former names: East Indian Railway Company

Services
Preceding station	Indian Railways	Following station
Kunuri towards Andal Junction	Eastern Railway zone Andal–Sainthia branch line	Sainthia Junction Terminus
Location

Mahishadahari railway station is a halt railway station of Andal–Sainthia branch line of the Asansol railway division connecting from Andal to Sainthia on the Sahibganj loop line. This is under the jurisdiction of Eastern Railway zone of Indian Railways. It is situated at Mahishadahari, Sainthia, Birbhum district in the Indian state of West Bengal.

== History ==
The Andal–Sainthia branch line was built in 1913. Electrification of Andal–Pandabeshwar section was completed in 2010–11 and Pandabeshwar–Saithia route including Mahishadahari railway station was completed in 2016.
