= SXD =

SXD may refer to:

- Siduli railway station (Station code: SXD), a railway station in West Bengal, India
- SunExpress Deutschland (ICAO: SXD), a defunct German leisure airline
