= Patharchapuri =

Patharchapuri Pathar Chapuri
- Village
- Location in West Bengal, India Patharchapuri (India)
- Coordinates: 23.92681°N 87.434293°E
- Country: India
- State: West Bengal
- District: Birbhum

Government
  - Type: Panchayati raj (India)
  - Body: Gram panchayat

Population (2011)
  - Total: 1,909

Languages
  - Official: Bengali, English
- Time zone: UTC+5:30 (IST)
- ISO 3166 code: IN-WB
- Vehicle registration: WB
- Lok Sabha constituency: Birbhum
- Vidhan Sabha constituency: Suri
- Website: birbhum.nic.in

Patharchapuri is a village in Suri I CD Block in Suri Sadar subdivision of Birbhum District in the Indian state of West Bengal. It is 12 kilometres (7.5 mi) from Suri. It is famous for Patharchapuri Dargah Sharif the monument of Data Mehboob Shah Wali. The nearest railway station of Patharchapuri is Siuri railway station.

== Geography ==
Cities and towns in Suri Sadar subdivision of Birbhum district
M: municipal city/ town, CT: census town, R: rural/ urban centre, B: Barrage.
Owing to space constraints in the small map, the actual locations in a larger map may vary slightly

=== Location ===
Pathar Chapuri is located at 23°55′37″N 87°26′03″E.

== History ==
A Muslim saint named Shah Meheboob but commonly known as Data Saheb is said to have been gifted with miraculous powers and he used to cure dangerous diseases by applying ash. He died on 10 Choitro 1298 according to the Bengali calendar.

Khan Bahadur, the Zamindar of Sekedda, initiated the organisation of a fair at Patharchapuri. He was the first president of the Mazar Maintenance Committee set up in 1918 by J.C.Dutta the District Magistrate. In 1933, Bijoychand Mahtab of Bardhaman Raj gifted the land.

== Demographics ==
As per the 2011 Census of India, Pathar Chapri had a total population of 1,909 of which 1,103 (58%) were males and 806 (42%) were females. Population below 6 years was 180. The total number of literates in Pathar Chapri was 1,385 (80.10% of the population over 6 years).

== Culture ==
The tomb of Data Saheb in the village is frequented by many visitors. A fair is held on 10–12 Choitro commemorating the death anniversary of Data Saheb. Lakhs of pilgrims assemble at Patharchapuri during the occasion.
