= Kajoragram railway station =

Railway station in West Bengal, India

General information
- Location: Khas Kajora Colliery, Kajora, Paschim Bardhaman district, West Bengal; India
- Coordinates: 23°21′56″N 87°06′53″E
- Elevation: 92 metres (302 ft)
- System: Indian Railways
- Owner: Indian Railways
- Operator: Eastern Railway
- Lines: Andal–Sainthia branch line Sahibganj loop
- Platforms: 2
- Tracks: 2

Construction
- Structure type: Standard (on ground station)
- Parking: No

Other information
- Status: Functioning
- Station code: KJME
- Division(s): Asansol

History
- Opened: 1913
- Electrified: 2010–11
- Former names: East Indian Railway Company

Services
Preceding station	Indian Railways	Following station
Andal towards Andal Junction	Eastern Railway zone Andal–Sainthia branch line	Siduli towards Sainthia Junction
Location

Kajoragram railway station is a railway station of Andal–Sainthia branch line of the Asansol railway division connecting from Andal to Sainthia on the Sahibganj loop line. This is under the jurisdiction of Eastern Railway zone of Indian Railways. It is situated at Khas Kajora Colliery, Kajora, Paschim Bardhaman district in the Indian state of West Bengal.

== History ==
The Andal–Sainthia branch line was built in 1913. Electrification of Andal–Pandabeshwar section including Kajoragram railway station was completed in 2010–11 and Pandabeshwar-Saithia route was completed in 2016.
