= Puri–Kamakhya Weekly Express (via Adra) =

Passenger train service in India

Overview
- Service type: Express
- First service: 27 December 2003; 21 years ago
- Current operator: Northeast Frontier Railway zone

Route
- Termini: Puri (PURI); Kamakhya Junction (KYQ)
- Stops: 24
- Distance travelled: 1,520 km (944 mi)
- Average journey time: 31 hours 10 minutes as 15639, 32 hours 15 minutes as 15640
- Service frequency: Once in a week
- Train number: 15639/15640

On-board services
- Classes: AC 2 Tier (2A), AC 3 Tier (3A), Sleeper class (SL), General Unreserved
- Seating arrangements: Yes
- Sleeping arrangements: Yes
- Catering facilities: On-board catering E-catering
- Observation facilities: LHB coach
- Baggage facilities: Below the seats

Technical
- Rolling stock: 2
- Track gauge: 1,676 mm (5 ft 6 in)
- Operating speed: 110 km/h (68 mph) maximum 49 km/h (30 mph) average, including halts (for 15639); 110 km/h (68 mph) maximum 47 km/h (29 mph) average, including halts (for 15640)

Puri–Kamakhya Weekly Express (via Adra) is an Express train belonging to Northeast Frontier Railway zone that runs between Puri in Odisha and Kamakhya Junction in Assam, via Adra Junction, Siuri , Rampurhat. It is currently being operated with 15639/15640 train numbers on a weekly basis.

== Speed ==
15639/ Puri–Kamakhya Express has an average speed of 49 km/h and covers 1520 km in 31h 10m. On the other hand, 15640/ Kamakhya–Puri Express has an average speed of 47 km/h and covers 1520 km in 32h 15m.

== Route and halts ==
Puri Kamakhya Express runs through the following stations:

ODISHA

1. Puri
2. Sakhi Gopal
3. Khurda Road Junction
4. Bhubaneswar
5. Cuttack Junction
6. Bhadrak
7. Balasore

WEST BENGAL

1. Hijli
2. Midnapore
3. Bankura Junction
4. Adra Junction
5. Asansol Junction
6. Durgapur
7. Siuri
8. Rampurhat Junction
9. New Farakka Junction
10. Malda Town
11. New Jalpaiguri (Siliguri)
12. New Cooch Behar
13. New Alipurduar

JHARKHAND

1. Pakur

BIHAR

1. Kishanganj

ASSAM

1. New Bongaigaon Junction
2. Barpeta Road
3. Rangiya Junction
4. Kamakhya

Note: Bold letters indicates Major Railway Stations/Major Cities.

== Coach composition ==
The train has standard LHB coach. The rakes are maintained by Northeast Frontier Railways. This train consists of 20 coaches that include:

- 1 AC II Tier (2A)
- 5 AC III Tier (3A)
- 10 Sleeper class coaches (SL)
- 2 General Unreserved
- 2 EOG

== Direction reversal ==
During its journey, this train reverses its direction once at Durgapur railway station.

== Traction ==
As the route is fully electrified, it is hauled by a Howrah Electric Loco Shed-based WAP-4 Electric locomotive from Puri to Kamakhya Junction and vice versa.

== Rake maintenance and sharing ==
The train is maintained by Northeast Frontier Railway. It shares its rake with 15643/15644 Puri–Kamakhya Weekly Express (via Howrah).

== See also ==
- Kamakhya Junction railway station
- Puri railway station
- Puri–Kamakhya Weekly Express (via Howrah)
- Paharia Express
