= Puri–Kamakhya Weekly Express (via Howrah) =

Train in India

Overview
- Service type: Express
- First service: 4 February 2016; 10 years ago
- Current operator: Northeast Frontier Railway

Route
- Termini: Puri (PURI); Kamakhya Junction (KYQ)
- Stops: 24
- Distance travelled: 1,520 km (940 mi)
- Average journey time: 32 hours 00 minutes as 15643, 32 hours 05 minutes as 15644
- Service frequency: Once a week
- Train number: 15643/15644

On-board services
- Classes: AC 2 Tier, AC 3 Tier, Sleeper 3 Tier, Unreserved
- Seating arrangements: Yes
- Sleeping arrangements: Yes
- Catering facilities: Yes
- Entertainment facilities: No
- Baggage facilities: Below the seats

Technical
- Rolling stock: LHB coach
- Track gauge: 1,676 mm (5 ft 6 in)
- Operating speed: 110 km/h (68 mph) maximum 47 km/h (29 mph) average, including halts

Puri–Kamakhya Weekly Express (via- Howrah) is an Express train of the Indian Railways connecting Puri in Odisha and Kamakhya Junction in Guwahati, Assam, via Howrah, Azimganj, and Siliguri Junction . It is currently being operated with 15643/15644 train numbers on once a in a week basis.

== Service ==
The 15643/Puri–Kamakhya Weekly Express has an average speed of 48 km/h and covers 1521 km in 31 hrs 55 mins. 15644/Kamakhya–Puri Weekly Express has an average speed of 48 km/h and covers 1521 km in 31 hrs 45 mins.

== Traction ==
Puri Kamakhya Express is hauled by WAP-7 locomotive of Electric Loco Shed, Howrah from Puri to Howrah. From Howrah to New Jalpaiguri the train is hauled by WAP-4 Locomotive of Electric Loco Shed, Howrah. Finally from New Jalpaiguri to Kamakhya the train is hauled by WDP-4D/ WDP-4/ WDP-4B Locomotive of Diesel Loco Shed, Siliguri.

== Route and halts ==
The important halts of the train are :

ODISHA

1. Puri
2. Khurda Road Junction
3. Bhubaneswar
4. Cuttack Junction
5. Jajpur Keonjhar Road
6. Bhadrak

WEST BENGAL

1. Kharagpur Junction
2. Howrah
3. Bandel Junction
4. Ambika Kalna
5. Nabadwip Dham
6. Katwa Junction
7. Khagraghat Road
8. Azimganj Junction
9. New Farakka
10. Malda Town
11. New Jalpaiguri Junction
12. Siliguri Junction
13. New Mal Junction
14. Alipurduar Junction

BIHAR

1. Barsoi Junction
2. Kishanganj

ASSAM

1. Kokrajhar
2. New Bongaigaon Junction
3. Goalpara Town
4. Kamakhya Junction

== Coach composition ==
The train consists of 17 coaches:

- 1 AC II Tier
- 2 AC III Tier
- 8 Sleeper coaches
- 4 General
- 2 Second-class Luggage/parcel van

== See also ==
- Kamakhya Junction railway station
- Puri railway station
- Puri–Kamakhya Weekly Express (via Adra)
- Paharia Express
