= The Levelfield School =

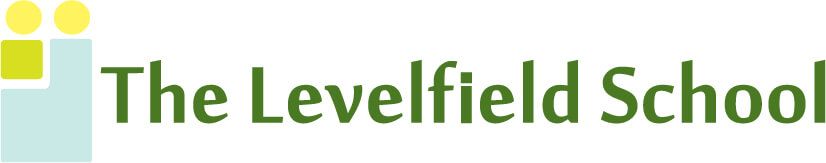

Location
- Village Husnabad; Suri, West Bengal - 731101; India; 23°55′18″N 87°30′13″E

Information
- Type: Private school
- Religious affiliation: Secular
- Established: 2010
- Founder: Arghya Banerjee
- Faculty: 30
- Gender: Mixed
- Age range: 6-18
- Enrollment: 500+
- Campus size: 2.5 acres
- Affiliation: IGCSE; Advanced Placement
- Website: www.levelfieldschool.com

The Levelfield School is a co-educational private school, located in the village Husnabad, Suri, Birbhum in West Bengal, that was founded with the aim of practising experimental pedagogy that differs from the conventional methods of the Indian education system. The school emphasizes reading, discussion, debate and the use of multimedia technology over rote learning or a textbook-based education.

Levelfield was founded in 2010 by Arghya Banerjee, a graduate of the Indian Institute of Technology, Kharagpur and Indian Institute of Management, Ahmedabad who quit his engineering job to start the school. He planned on founding a school that did not follow the usual Indian teaching methods, which often give extreme importance to examinations or over-rely on textbooks and rote learning.

The school, instead, focuses on overall development and employs teaching methods that include watching world cinema to discuss subjects such as sociology, ethics or history; playing board games to understand strategy; reading books, solving puzzles or watching documentaries. The unconventional methods of the school have been covered by the Indian media.
