= Andal–Sitarampur loop line =

Railway line in West Bengal

Overview
- Status: Operational
- Owner: Indian Railways
- Locale: West Bengal
- Termini: Andal; Sitarampur Junction
- Stations: 10

Service
- Type: Electric
- System: Broad gauge
- Operator: Eastern Railway

History
- Opened: 1864

Technical
- Line length: 41 km (25 mi)
- Track gauge: 5 ft 6 in (1,676 mm) broad gauge
- Electrification: Yes
- Operating speed: up to 100 km/h (62 mph)

The Andal–Sitarampur loop line is a railway line connecting Andal & Sitarampur on the Bardhaman–Asansol section of the Howrah–Delhi main line with each other. This 41 kilometres (25 mi) track is under the jurisdiction of Eastern Railway. This track primarily serves the northern coalfield areas of the Paschim Bardhaman district in the Indian state of West Bengal.

== History ==
The Ondal-Baboissola Railway was constructed by the Tarkessur Railway Company in 1863 and was opened to traffic on 1864. The lines were worked upon by East Indian Railway Company till 1914 before the Tarkessur Railway Company was acquired by the State in 1915 & incorporated with EIR following which this line became a part of the EIR network. The original line opened from Andal (Ondal) to Tapasi via Baboissola (Babuisol, near Andal) & Mangalpur on 1863. This was further extended to Rupnarayanpur on the Howrah–Delhi main line via Ikrah, Churulia & Gaurangdi on 1894–95.

The Ikrah-Barabani branch line opened on 1894. This further extended to Sitarampur on the Bardhaman–Asansol section in 1902.

The Tapasi-Barabani Chord line was completed between 1908–15 to serve the numerous collieries in the area.

Post independence, the Ikrah-Churulia-Gaurangdi-Rupnarayanpur section suffered heavy losses due to which services were withdrawn by Eastern Railway in 1988. The line was scrapped by iron mafias and a mine was set up by dismantling the tracks in 1995.

== Branch lines ==
There are two branch lines in this section. The first is the Tapasi-Barabani Chord section. This primarily serves the coalfields of the Sripur Area & Satgram Area and is used by freight trains, The other is the Ikrah-Churulia-Gaurangdi-Rupnarayanpur section. This track was dismantled. A new line was proposed in the railway budget of 2011 between Barabani & Churulia.

== Electrification ==
Electrification of the Andal-Barabani-Sitarampur section was sanctioned in the rail budget for 2011–12, and was completed in 2017.
