= Altagram railway station =

Railway Station in West Bengal, India

Altagram Railway Station

General information
- Location: National Highway 31, Altagram, P.s - Dhupguri, Dist - Jalpaiguri; India
- Coordinates: 26.6214°N 88.8695°E
- Elevation: 89 metres (292 ft)
- System: Indian Railways Station
- Owner: Indian Railways
- Operator: Northeast Frontier Railway zone
- Lines: Barauni–Guwahati line, New Jalpaiguri–New Bongaigaon section
- Platforms: 3
- Tracks: 4 (broad gauge)

Construction
- Parking: Available

Other information
- Status: Functioning
- Station code: ATM
- Zone(s): Northeast Frontier Railway zone
- Division(s): Alipurduar
Location
- Location within West Bengal Location within India

Altagram Railway Station serves the town of Altagram which lies on the bank of river River Jaldhaka near Dhupguri, Jalpaiguri district in the Indian state of West Bengal. The station lies on the New Jalpaiguri–New Bongaigaon section of Barauni–Guwahati line of Northeast Frontier Railway. This station falls under Alipurduar railway division.
