= Durgapur railway station =

Railway Station in West Bengal, India

DURGAPUR

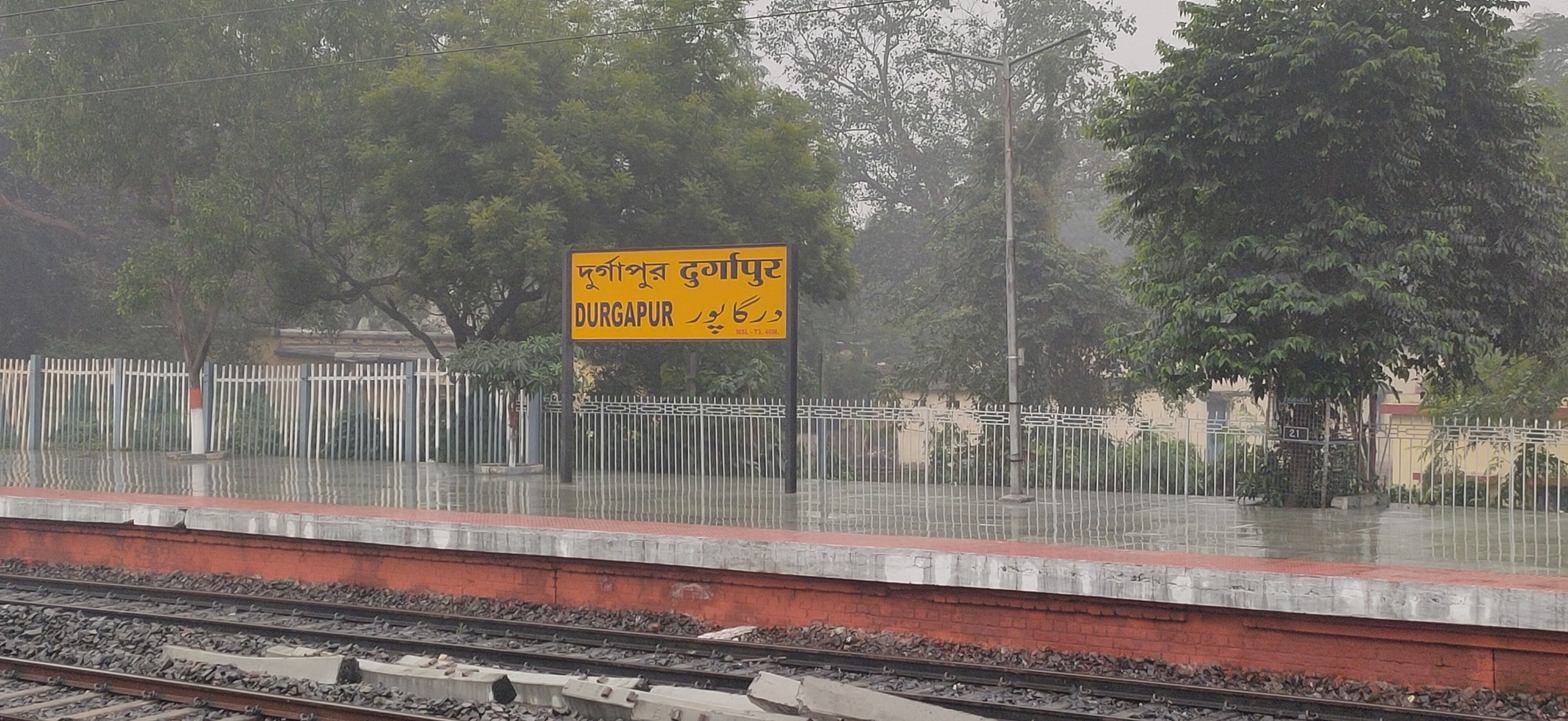
- Durgapur railway station

General information
- Location: Durgapur, West Bengal; India
- Coordinates: 23°29′43″N 87°19′03″E
- Elevation: 71 metres (233 ft)
- System: Indian Railways station
- Owner: Indian Railways
- Operator: Eastern Railway
- Lines: Bardhaman–Asansol section Howrah–Delhi main line Howrah–Gaya–Delhi line Howrah–Prayagraj–Mumbai line
- Platforms: 5
- Tracks: 9 + 1 (upcoming)
- Bus stands: Durgapur Station Bus Stand
- Connections: Mini bus routes within the city and other bus connecting other cities as well.

Construction
- Structure type: At grade
- Parking: Yes
- Cycle facilities: Yes
- Accessible: Yes

Other information
- Status: Functioning
- Station code: DGR
- Zone(s): Eastern Railway
- Division(s): Asansol

History
- Opened: 1855
- Rebuilt: 2010(expanded),2019(renovated)
- Electrified: 1965–66
- Former names: East Indian Railway Company
Location
- Location within West Bengal Location within India
- Interactive map

Durgapur is a model railway station on the Bardhaman–Asansol section. It is located in Paschim Bardhaman district in the Indian state of West Bengal. It serves Durgapur, the third most populous city in West Bengal, and the surrounding industrial areas. It was ranked the third-cleanest railway station in India in 2019.

== Overview ==
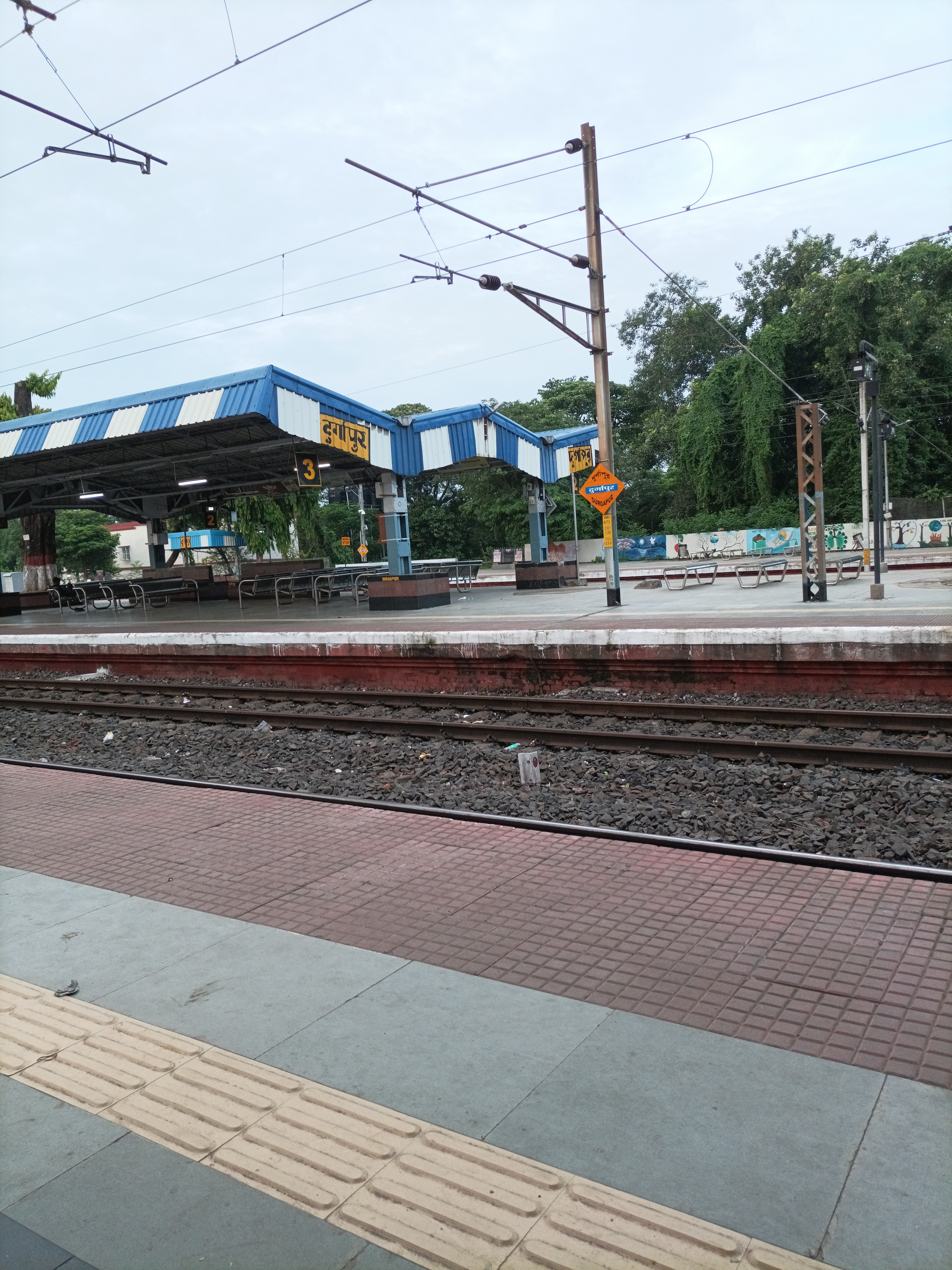
Platform of the Durgapur railway station in Burdwan, July 2022.

Mining-Industry Zone

"The entire belt between Durgapur (171 km [via Main Line] and 158 km [via Chord Line] from Howrah), and all the way up to Dhanbad and beyond is industrialized. Apart from factories, there are many coalmines, some closed now, and some with fires burning deep in the mineshafts. The mining area extends for a large area, mostly to the south of the tracks. Quite a portion of the track passes through cuttings, where the surrounding area is higher than the track level, resulting in the profusion of characteristic small masonry bridges crossing the tracks." This description is from "Gomoh loco shed and CLW trip record" by Samit Roychoudhury.

== History ==
The first passenger train in eastern India run from Howrah to Hooghly on 15 August 1854. The track was extended to Raniganj by 1855.

== Electrification ==
The Mankar–Waria sector was electrified in 1965–66.

== Gallery ==
Durgapur railway station new entrance

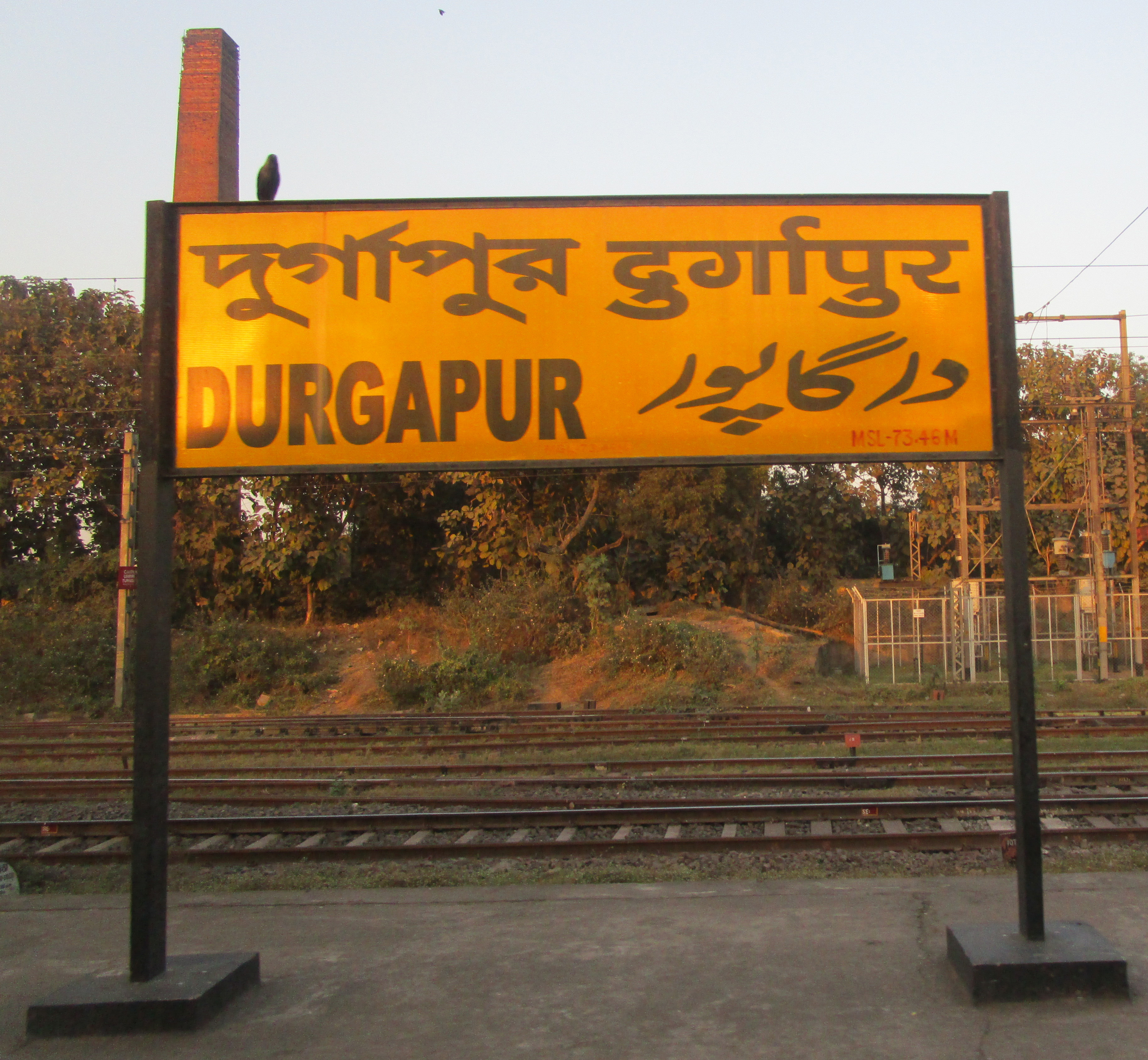
Durgapur railway station nameplate

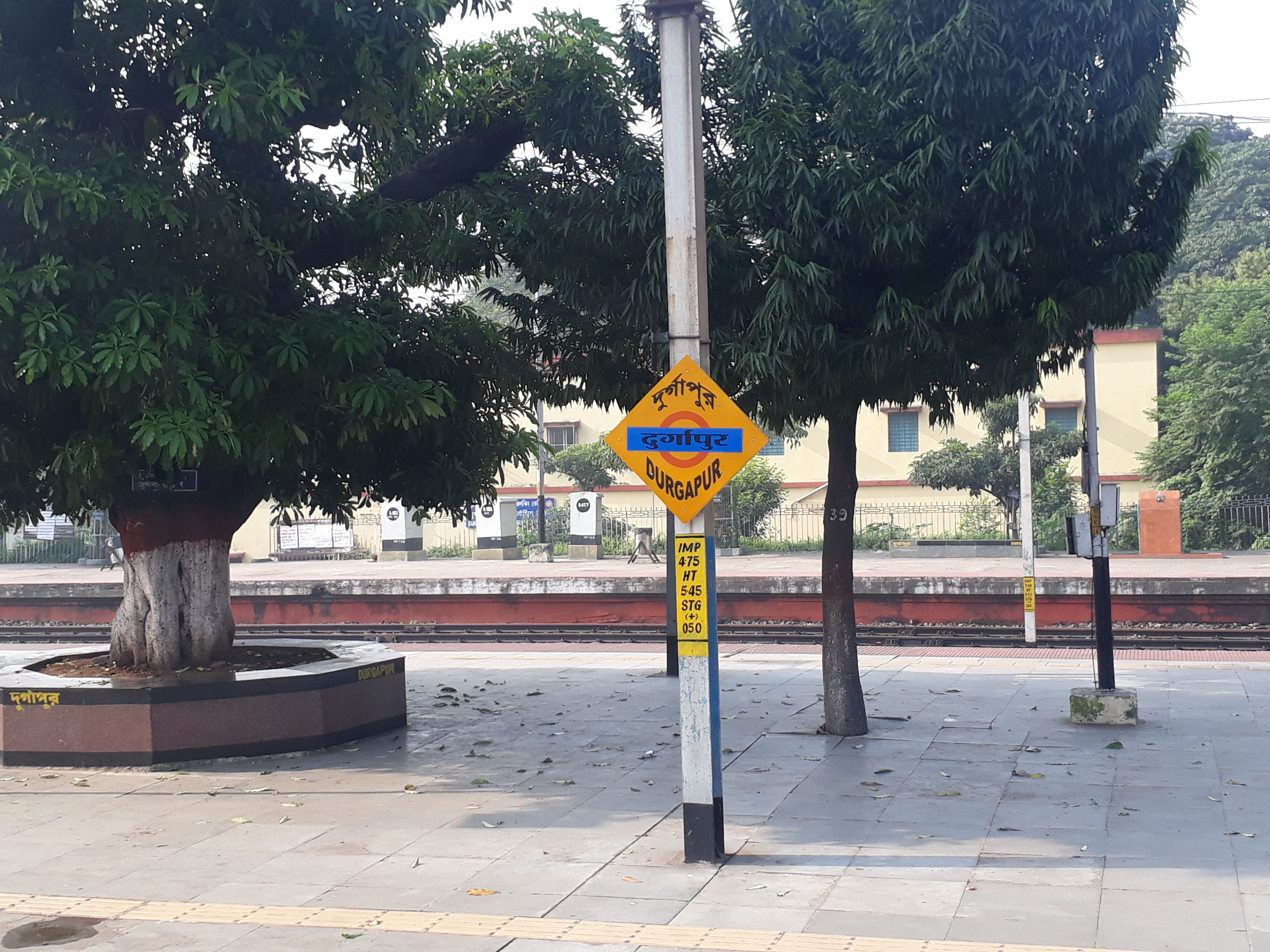
Durgapur station platform

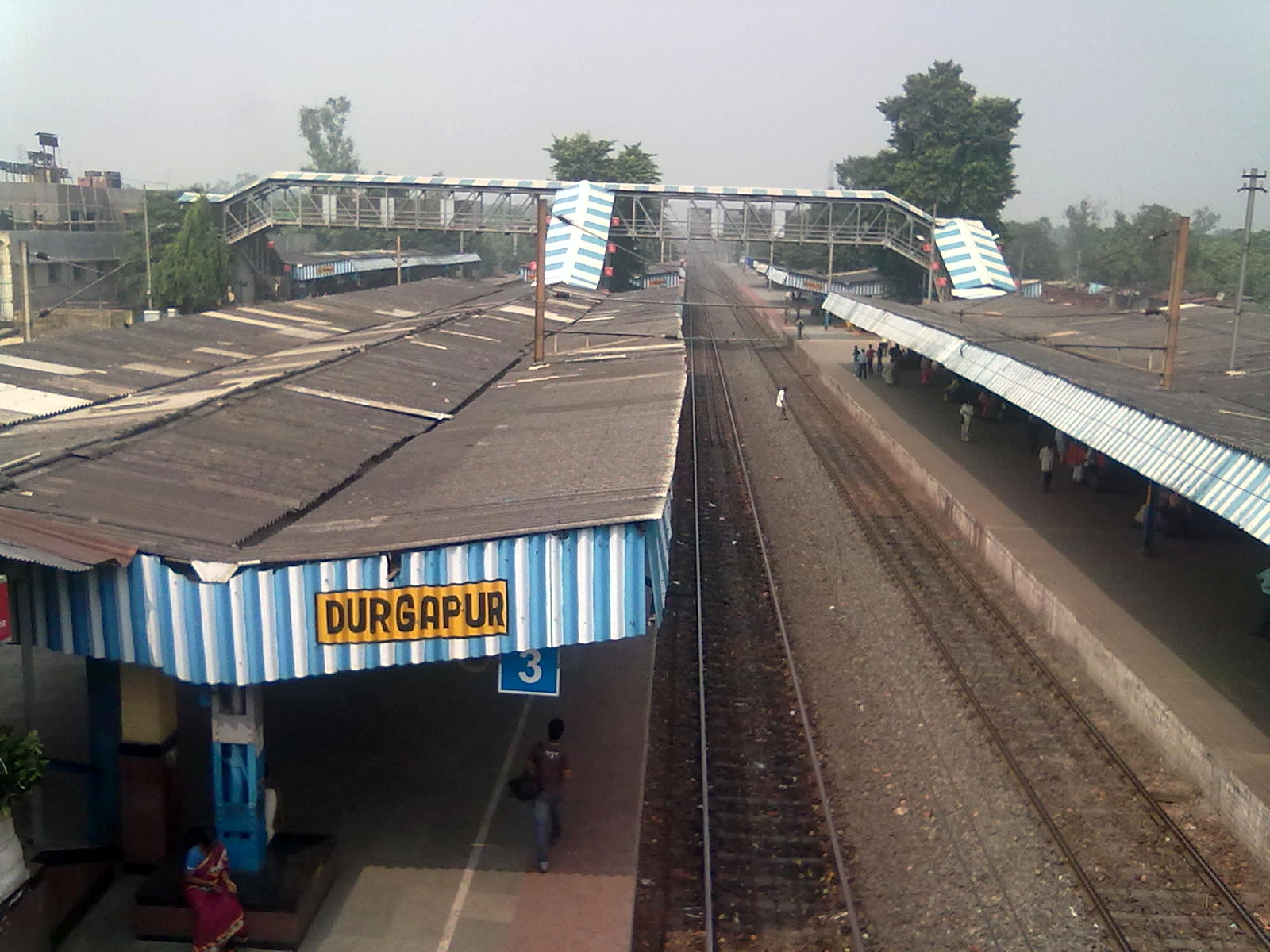
Durgapur railway station, Durgapur, WB

| Preceding station | Indian Railways | Following station |
|---|---|---|
| Rajbandh towards Barddhaman Junction | Eastern Railway zone Bardhaman–Asansol section | Waria towards Asansol Junction |
