= Sainthia Junction railway station =

Railway Station in West Bengal, India

Sainthia Junction
- Main Entrance of the Sainthia Junction

General information
- Location: Station Road, Sainthia, Birbhum district, West Bengal; India
- Coordinates: 23°56′58″N 87°40′52″E
- Elevation: 58 metres (190 ft)
- System: Indian Railways junction station
- Owner: Indian Railways
- Operator: Eastern Railway
- Lines: Howrah-New Jalpaiguri Main Line; Bardhaman-Rampurhat section; Andal–Sainthia branch line
- Platforms: 5
- Tracks: 7

Construction
- Structure type: At grade
- Parking: Available

Other information
- Status: Functioning
- Station code: SNT
- Zone(s): Eastern Railway
- Division(s): Howrah

History
- Opened: 1 September 1859; 167 years ago
- Electrified: 2016; 10 years ago
Location
- Location within West Bengal Location within India

Sainthia Junction railway station is one of the oldest stations in India serves Sainthia city of Birbhum district in the Indian state of West Bengal. It is a "NSG-5" category railway station. The railway station is on the Bardhaman-Rampurhat Section under the administrative control of Howrah division of Eastern Railway. Sainthia Junction comes under the jurisdiction of Sainthia GRP Police Station. There is a total of 55 train arrivals and departures per day happening at this railway station. Sainthia Junction is the 3rd busiest railway station in Birbhum district. This railway station is the busiest "NSG-5" category railway station in Howrah division and 6th busiest in all of NSG category railway stations in Howrah division. It also serves as the originating station of 4 important trains. In this station the famous Sainthia train collision took place between Uttar Banga Express and Vananchal Express

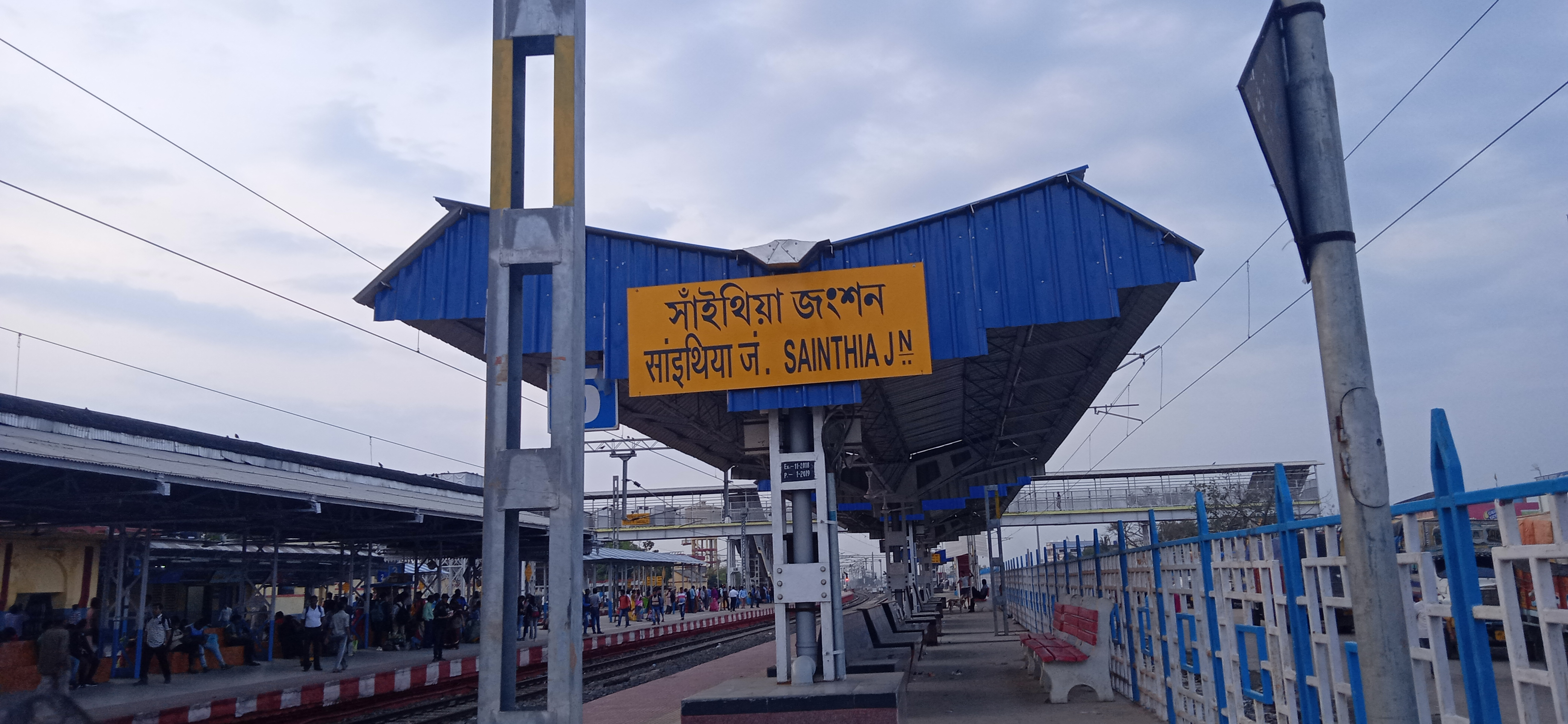
Platform No. 5 of the Sainthia Junction railway station

== Trains ==
Some of the Major Trains available from this railway station are as follows:

- Guwahati-Howrah Saraighat Super-fast Express
- Sealdah-Alipurduar Kanchan Kanya Express
- Sealdah-Bamanhat Uttar Banga Express
- Sealdah–Silchar Kanchenjunga Express
- Sealdah–Agartala Kanchenjunga Express
- Sealdah-Rampurhat Maa Taara Express
- Ranchi Bhagalpur Vananchal Express
- Ranchi–Kamakhya Express
- Howrah Rampurhat Mayurkashi Express
- Howrah–Malda Town Intercity Express
- Howrah–Azimganj Kavi Guru Express
- Howrah-Azimganj Ganadevata Express
- Howrah-Radhikapur Kulik Express
- Howrah–Gaya Express

=== List of Trains that Not Restored Yet ===
- 12373/74 Sealdah - Rampurhat Triweekly Intercity Superfast Express
- 13013/14 Rampurhat - Bardhaman Triweekly Express
- 13119/20 Sealdah - Anvt Upper India Express (2 Days a week)
- 13133/34 Sealdah - Varanasi Upper India Express (5 Days a week)
- 53043/44 Howrah - Rajgir Fast Passenger (Daily)
- 53417/18 Bardhaman - Malda Town Passenger (Daily)
- 15941/42 Dibrugarh - Jhajha Weekly Express

== History ==
Construction of the Khana–Rajmahal section of Sahibganj loop was completed in October 1859. Construction of the Sainthia railway station was done as part of building the entire line and that was the start of the Sainthia railway station that year. The first passenger train journey from this station started on 1 September 1859. On 4 July 1860, train service started from Howrah to Rajmahal via Khana.

The Andal–Sainthia branch line was built in 1913.

== Accident ==
The Sainthia train collision occurred on 19 July 2010, at the Sainthia junction, when the Uttar Banga Express collided with the Vananchal Express as the latter was leaving the platform. 66 people died as a result of the accident, and 165 were reported injured.

== Amenities ==
Amenities at Sainthia railway station include sheds, first-class and second-class waiting rooms, escalators, two over bridges, digital clock, CCTV camera, toilet and book stall.

== Goods facilities ==
There were full rake goods sheds at the Sainthia railway station until 2018. Currently, it is used as a railway siding to load/unload material in the rakes.

Preceding station	Indian Railways	Following station
Bataspur towards Khana	Eastern Railway zone Sahibganj loop	Gadadharpur towards Kiul Junction
Mahishadahari towards Andal Junction	Eastern Railway zone Andal–Sainthia branch line	Terminus
