= Andal Junction railway station =

Railway Station in West Bengal, India

ANDAL JUNCTION

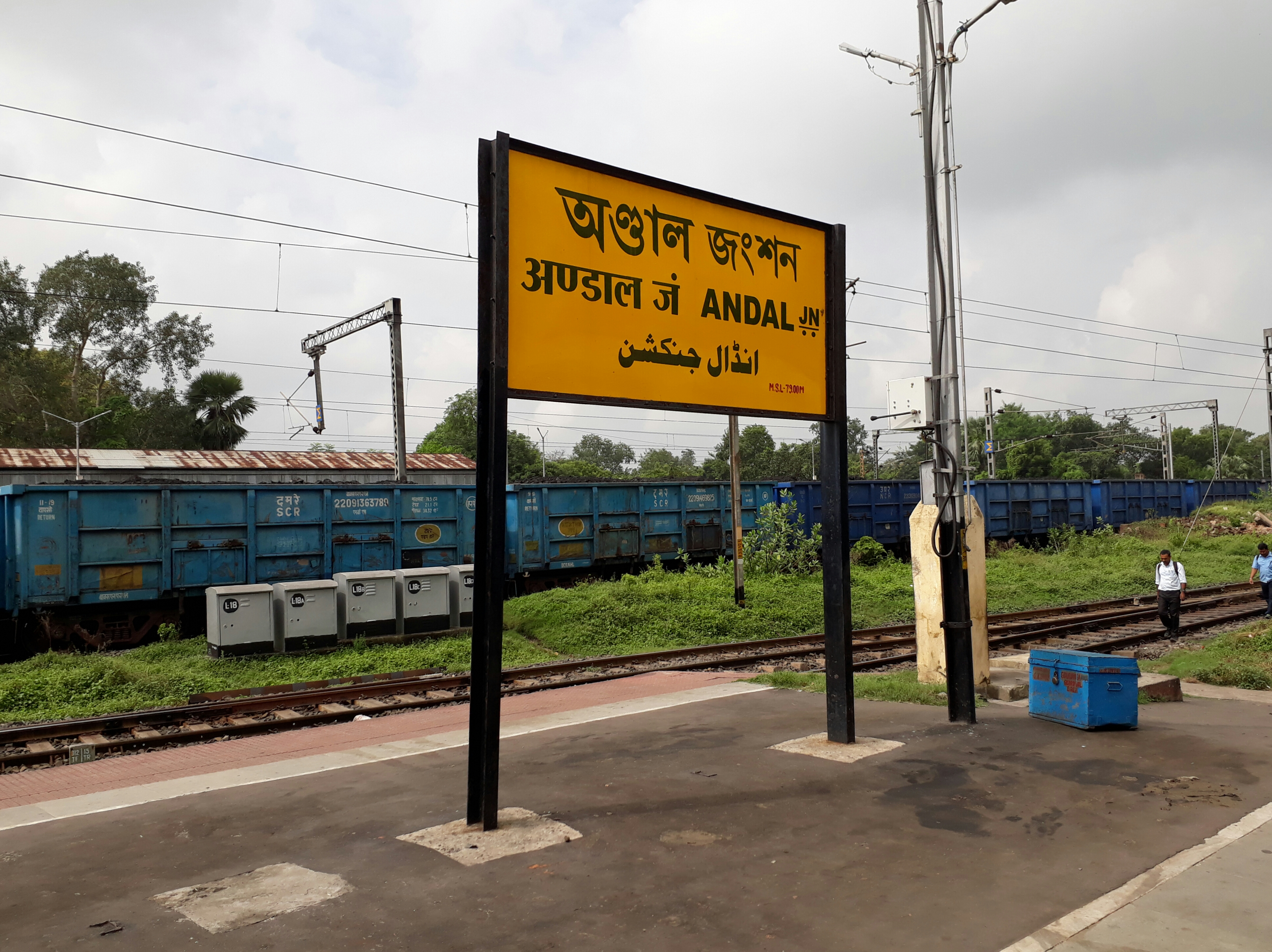
- Andal Junction platform

General information
- Location: Andal, Durgapur, West Bengal; India
- Coordinates: 23°34′44″N 87°10′52″E
- Elevation: 86 metres (282 ft)
- System: Indian Railways junction station
- Owner: Indian Railways
- Operator: Eastern Railway
- Lines: Bardhaman–Asansol section Howrah–Delhi main line Howrah–Gaya–Delhi line Howrah–Allahabad–Mumbai line Andal–Sainthia branch line Andal–Sitarampur branch line
- Platforms: 6

Construction
- Structure type: Standard (on ground station)
- Parking: Yes
- Cycle facilities: Yes

Other information
- Status: Functioning
- Station code: UDL
- Zone(s): Eastern Railway
- Division(s): Asansol

History
- Opened: 1855
- Electrified: 1960–61
- Former names: East Indian Railway Company
Location
- Location within West Bengal Location within India
- Interactive map of Andal Junction

Andal Junction is a railway station on the Bardhaman–Asansol line. The Andal–Sainthia and Andal–Sitarampur branch lines both include colliery siding and start from Andal. It serves Andal area of Durgapur and the surrounding mining-industrial areas.

== Electrification ==
The Barddhaman–Asansol section was electrified in 1960–61.

== Facilities ==
=== Locomotive shed ===
Andal has a diesel locomotive shed. It houses WDS-6, WDM-2, WDM 3A, WDG-3A, WDG-4 and WDG-4D locomotives. The first WDM-2 manufactured by Banaras Locomotive Works is in Andal locomotive shed.

Diesel Loco Shed, Andal
Serial No.	Locomotive Class	Horsepower	Quantity
1.	WDG-3A	3100	4
2.	WDG-4/4D	4000/4500	148
Total Locomotive Active as of July 2025			152

=== Marshalling yard ===
Andal Yard is one of the largest in the Eastern Railway section. Coal loaded at various colliery sidings is hauled to the yard by diesel locomotives. Coal is supplied in rakes to thermal power plants at Bakreshwar, Farrakka and Sagardighi. Substantial amounts of coal are dispatched to destinations on Northeast Frontier Railway as well.

Preceding station	Indian Railways	Following station
Pinjrapol towards Barddhaman Junction	Eastern Railway zone Bardhaman–Asansol section	Baktarnagar towards Asansol Junction
Terminus	Eastern Railway zone Andal–Sainthia branch line	Kajoragram towards Sainthia Junction
Terminus	Eastern Railway zone Andal–Sitarampur branch line	Sonachara towards Sitarampur Junction
