= Andal–Sainthia branch line =

Railway line in India

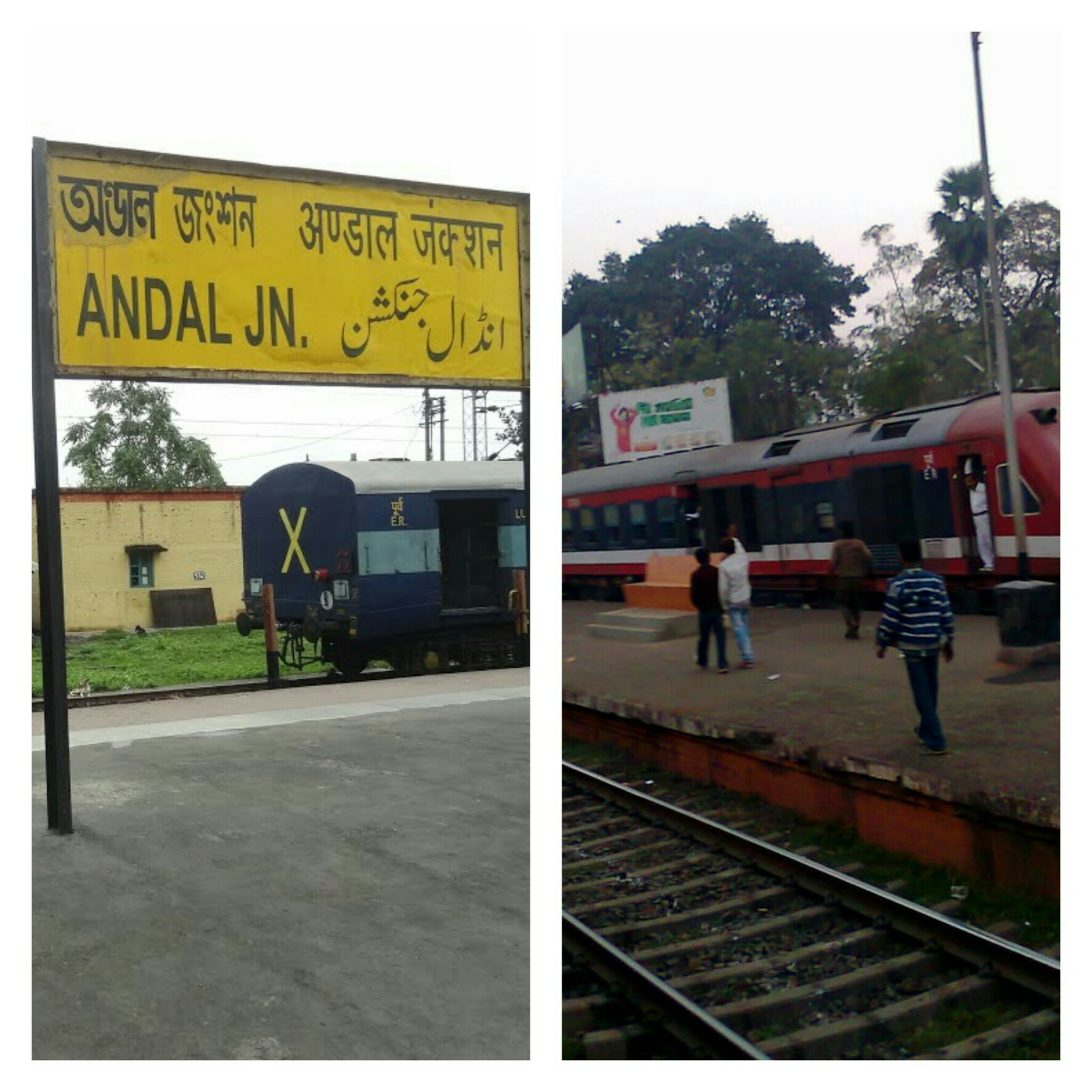
- Andal railway station and Sainthia railway station

Overview
- Status: Operational
- Owner: Indian Railways
- Locale: West Bengal
- Termini: Andal; Sainthia Junction
- Stations: 15

Service
- Type: Electric
- System: Broad gauge
- Operator(s): Eastern Railway

History
- Opened: 1913

Technical
- Line length: 73 km (45 mi)
- Track gauge: 5 ft 6 in (1,676 mm) broad gauge
- Electrification: Yes
- Operating speed: up to 100 km/h (62 mph)

The Andal–Sainthia branch line is a railway line connecting Andal on the Bardhaman–Asansol section of the Howrah–Delhi main line and Sainthia Junction on the Sahibganj loop. This 73 kilometres (45 mi) track is under the jurisdiction of Eastern Railway. This track passes through the north-eastern part of the Raniganj Coalfield in Bardhaman district and the western part of Birbhum district in the Indian state of West Bengal.

This track serves Bakreshwar Thermal Power Station.

== History ==
The Andal–Sainthia branch line was built in 1913.

== Branch lines ==
There are two branch lines in this section. The first is the Andal–Barabani–Sitarampur section. The other is the Bhimgara–Palasthali branch line. Service on this line was suspended for safety reasons. The track became unfit because of unauthorized mining under the track.

== Electrification ==
Electrification of Andal–Pandabeshwar section was completed in 2010–11. Electrification of the Pandabeshwar-Sainthia section was sanctioned in the rail budget for 2011–12, which was expected to be completed until 2013 and completed in 2016.
