= Madhaipur =

- Village
- Location in West Bengal, India Madhaipur (India)
- Coordinates: 23°42′16″N 87°20′49″E
- Country: India
- State: West Bengal
- District: Paschim Bardhaman

Population (2011)
  - Total: 5,140

Languages*
  - Official: Bengali, Hindi, English
- Time zone: UTC+5:30 (IST)
- PIN: 713381
- Telephone code: 91 341
- Lok Sabha constituency: Asansol
- Vidhan Sabha constituency: Pandaveswar
- Website: paschimbardhaman.co.in

Madhaipur is a village in the Faridpur Durgapur CD block in the Durgapur subdivision of Paschim Bardhaman district in the Indian state of West Bengal.

== Geography ==
Cities, towns and ECL Areas in the northern portion of Durgapur subdivision in Paschim Bardhaman district
MC: Municipal Corporation, CT: census town, R: rural administrative centre
Owing to space constraints in the small map, the actual locations in a larger map may vary slightly

=== Urbanisation ===
According to the 2011 census, 79.22% of the population of the Durgapur subdivision was urban and 20.78% was rural. The Durgapur subdivision has 1 municipal corporation at Durgapur and 38 (+1 partly) census towns (partly presented in the map alongside; all places marked on the map are linked in the full-screen map).

== Demographics ==
According to the 2011 Census of India, Madhaipur had a total population of 5,140, of which 2,677 (52%) were males and 2,473 (48%) were females. Population in the age range 0–6 years was 607. The total number of literate persons in Madhaipur was 3,481 (76.78% of the population over 6 years).

*For language details see Faridpur Durgapur#Language and religion

== Economy ==
According to the ECL website telephone numbers, operational collieries in the Pandaveswar Area of Eastern Coalfields in 2018 are: Dalurband Colliery, Khottadih OCP, Khottadih UG, Madhaipur Colliery, Manderbony Colliery, Pandaveswar Colliery and South Samla Colliery.

== Healthcare ==
Medical facilities (dispensaries) in the Pandaveswar Area of ECL are available at Pandaveswar Area PME Centre (PO Pandaveswar), Madhaipur (PO Nutundanga), Mandarboni (PO Nutundanga), South Samla (PO Pandaveswar), Pandaveswar (PO Pandaveswar), Dalurbandh (PO Pandaveswar), Khottadih (PO Khottadih), Area Dispensary (PO Pandaveswar).
