= Kenda Area =

Operational area of Eastern Coalfields Limited in West Bengal, India

- Location in West Bengal Kenda Area (India)
- Location: 23.6673°N 87.1793°E
- Products: Non-coking coal
- Company: Eastern Coalfields Limited
- Website: http://www.easterncoal.gov.in/

Kenda Area is one of the 14 operational areas of Eastern Coalfields Limited located mostly in Durgapur subdivision and partly in Asansol subdivision of Paschim Bardhaman district in the state of West Bengal, India.

== Geography ==
Collieries in the Kenda Area of Eastern Coalfields
U: Underground Colliery, O: Open Cast Colliery, S: Mining support, A: Administrative headquarters
Owing to space constraints in the small map, the actual locations in a larger map may vary slightly

=== Location ===
The Kenda Area is located around 23.6673°N 87.1793°E

The Kenda Area is bounded by the rural areas of Jamuria and Pandabeswar CD Blocks on the north, Sonpur Bazari and Bankola Area on the east, Kajora Area on the south, and Kunustoria Area on the west.

The map alongside shows some of the collieries in the Area. However, as the collieries do not have individual pages, there are no links in the full screen map.

=== Coal ===
As per the Shodhganga website, collieries in the Kenda Area are: New Kenda, Bahula, Lower Kenda, Haripur, Chora, Chora Incline, Siduli, C.I. Jambad and Chora OCP .

As per ECL website telephone numbers, operational collieries in the Kenda Area in 2018 are: Bahula Colliery, Chora Block Incline, CI Jambad Colliery, Chora OCP, Haripur Colliery, Lower Kenda Colliery, New Kenda Colliery, Siduli Colliery, SK OCP, West Kenda OCP.

Operational Areas of ECL (Source:ENVIS Centre on Environmental Problems of Mining)

== Mining plan ==
An overview of the proposed mining activity plan in Cluster 11 of 11 mines in Kenda Area (including some mines in adjoining areas), as of 2016, is as follows:
1. Krishnanagar underground mine has an annual capacity of 0.05 million tonnes and an expected life of over 25 years.
2. Haripur UG mine has an annual capacity of 0.75 million tonnes and an expected life of 15 years.
3. Chhora Block Incline (UG) has an annual capacity of 0.10 mt and an expected life of over 25 years, Bonbahal open cast patch has an annual capacity of 0.50 mt and an expected life of 3 years.
4. Chhora 7,8 &9 pits (UG) has an annual capacity of 0.15 mt and an expected life of over 25 years, Shankarpur/ Jambad OC patch has an annual capacity of 0.80 mt and an expected life of 6 years.
5. New Kenda UG mine has an annual capacity of 0.05 mt and an expected life of over 25 years. West Kenda OC patch has an annual capacity of 0.75 mt and an expected life of 6 years. New Kenda OC patch has an annual capacity of 1.20 mt and an expected life of 8 years.
6. Lower Kenda UG mine has an annual capacity of 0.15 mt and an expected life of over 25 years.
7. Bahula UG mine has an annual capacity of 0.25 mt and an expected life of over 25 years.
8. CL Jambad UG has an annual capacity of 0.05 mt and an expected life of over 25 years.
9. Siduli is a mixed mine. Siduli OC patch with an annual capacity of 1.2 mt and an expected life of 6 years will be followed by Siduli UG mine with an annual capacity of 1.02 mt and an expected life of over 25 years.
10. Khandra UG mine has an annual capacity of 0.20 mt and an expected life of over 25 years.
11. In Shankarpur Project OC mining with annual capacity of 2.00 mt and an expected life of 4 years will be followed by Shankarpur UG with annual capacity of 1.16 mt and expected life of over 25 years.

Cities, towns and ECL Areas in the northern portion of Durgapur subdivision in Paschim Bardhaman district
MC: Municipal Corporation, CT: census town, R: rural administrative centre
Owing to space constraints in the small map, the actual locations in a larger map may vary slightly

== Open-cast mine at Kenda ==
In a study regarding the feasibility of an open cast mine at Kenda, it was mentioned that both R-V and R-VI seams had been extensively developed and underground mining carried out for many years. 13.6 million tonnes of good quality coal was lying blocked in the pillars. Open cast mining was recommended for taking out this coal, as well as coal from a virgin R-VIIB seam, which otherwise was difficult to mine because of low thickness of the seam. Once the coal from the upper seams is taken out, the quarry is to be backfilled and underground mining of the lower seams can be undertaken. The total area of the coal block is about 7 km^{2}. About 300 acres of land was required for the project, a proposal in which land owners evinced interest in lieu of compensation including employment. The employment potential of the project was much higher than the number of landowners. In addition, the area could benefit from CSR-related activities. Water supply arrangements for Kenda mouza was already in progress.

As of 2018, West Kenda OCP is in operation around where the New Kenda Colliery is.

== Fire in New Kenda Colliery in 1994 ==
"On 25.1.1994 at about 3.30 p.m. a fire broke out in the workings of Dobrana seam at New Kenda Colliery. The fire occurred in the main intake airway close to the downcast shaft. Smoke and noxious gases from the fire spread to the working places and caused the death of 55 persons. This has been the worst fire disaster of this century in Indian mines." The fire could not be extinguished immediately and the fire area had to be sealed off. The fire died down after about one and a half years. After the fire died down, heavy roof fall was observed in the sealed off galleries.

== Subsidence ==
Traditionally many underground collieries have left a void after taking out the coal. As a result, almost all areas are facing subsidence. As per CMPDIL, there were 9 points of subsidence in the Kenda Area involving 120.96 hectares of land.

== Migrants ==
Prior to the advent of coal mining, the entire region was a low-productive rice crop area in what was once a part of the Jungle Mahals. The ownership of land had passed on from local adivasis to agricultural castes before mining started. However, the Santhals and the Bauris, referred to by the colonial administrators as "traditional coal cutters of Raniganj" remained attached to their lost land and left the mines for agricultural related work, which also was more remunerative. It forced the mine-owners to bring in outside labour, mostly from Bihar, Odisha and Uttar Pradesh. In time the migrants dominated the mining and industrial scenario. The pauperization and alienation of the adivasis have been major points of social concern.

== Transport ==
The Andal-Sainthia branch line passes through this Area.

NH 14 (old number NH 60) pass through the edges of Kenda Area.

== Notable people ==
- Vivek (singer)
