= Sarpi, Paschim Bardhaman =

Sarpi
- Census Town
- Location in West Bengal, India Sarpi (India)
- Coordinates: 23.7°N 87.08°E
- Country: India
- State: West Bengal
- District: Paschim Bardhaman

Area
  - Total: 5.43 km^{2} (2.10 sq mi)

Population (2011)
  - Total: 5,549
  - Density: 1,020/km^{2} (2,650/sq mi)

Languages*
  - Official: Bengali, Hindi, English
- Time zone: UTC+5:30 (IST)
- PIN: 713363
- Telephone/STD code: 0341
- Vehicle registration: WB
- Lok Sabha constituency: Asansol
- Vidhan Sabha constituency: Pandaveswar
- Website: paschimbardhaman.co.in

Sarpi is a census town in the Faridpur Durgapur CD block in the Durgapur subdivision of the Paschim Bardhaman district in the Indian state of West Bengal.

== Geography ==
Cities, towns and ECL Areas in the northern portion of Durgapur subdivision in Paschim Bardhaman district
MC: Municipal Corporation, CT: census town, R: rural administrative centre
Owing to space constraints in the small map, the actual locations in a larger map may vary slightly

=== Location ===
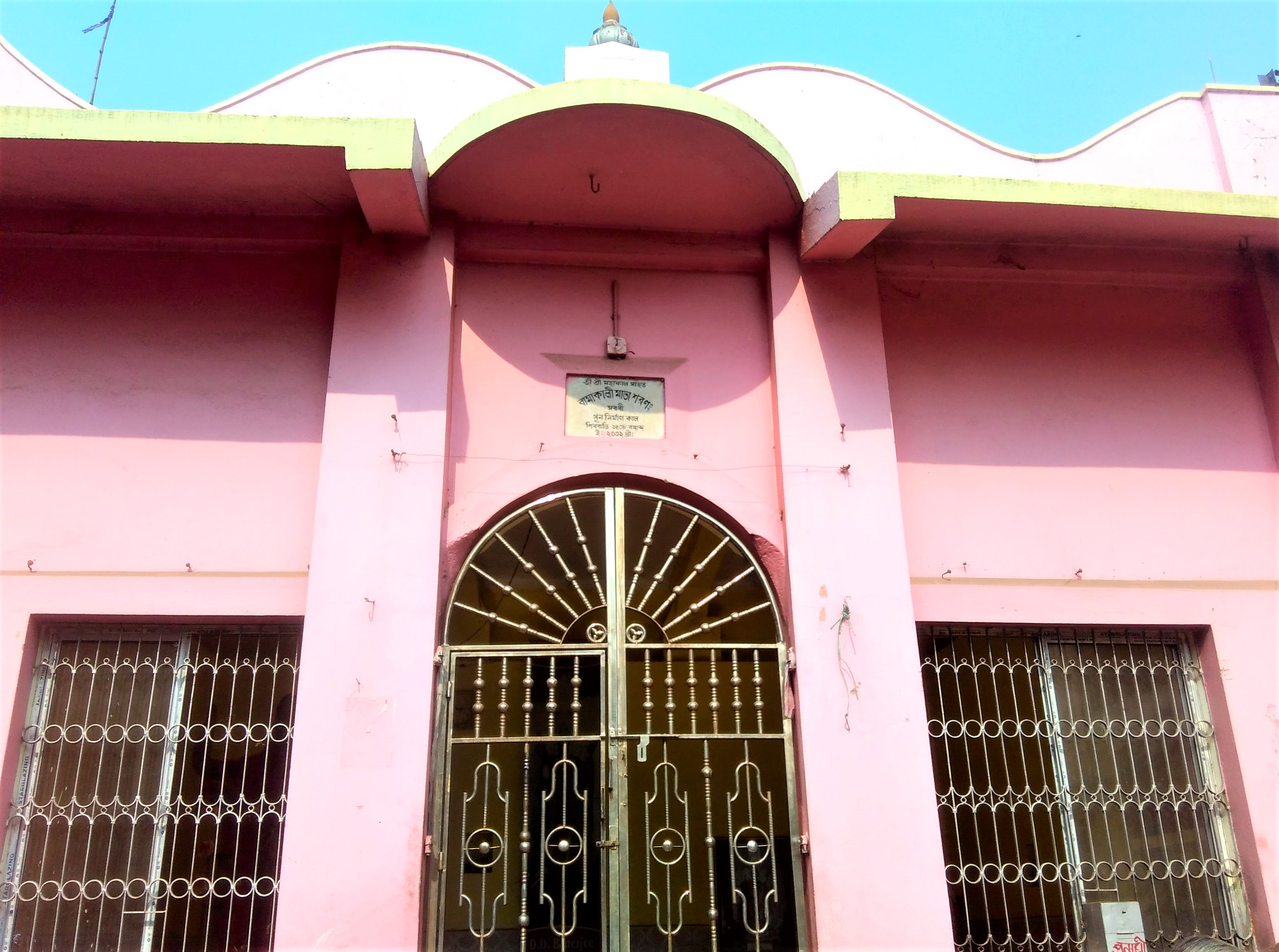
Bamakali Mandir, Sarpi, Paschim Bardhaman

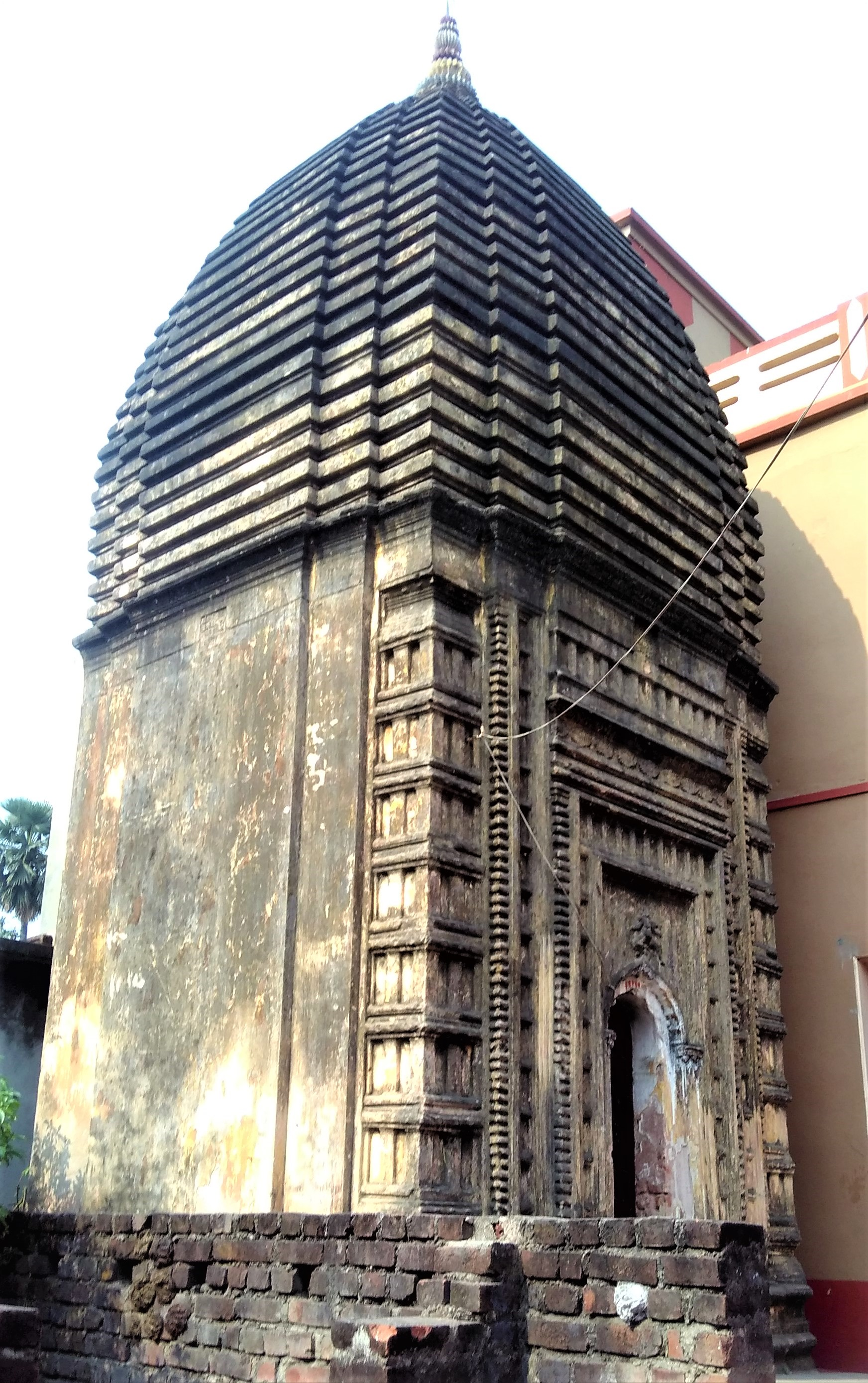
Shiva temple of Banerjee family, Sarpi, Paschim Bardhaman

Sarpi is located at 23°38′59″N 87°16′27″E.

Banagram, Mandarbani, Sirsha, Nabaghanapur, Sarpi and Ichhapur form a series of census towns along the western border of Faridpur-Durgapur CD Block.

=== Urbanisation ===
According to the 2011 census, 79.22% of the population of the Durgapur subdivision was urban and 20.78% was rural. The Durgapur subdivision has 1 municipal corporation at Durgapur and 38 (+1 partly) census towns (partly presented in the map alongside; all places marked on the map are linked in the full-screen map).

== Demographics ==
According to the 2011 Census of India, Sarpi had a total population of 5,549, of which 2,941 (53%) were males and 2,608 (47%) were females. Population in the age range 0–6 years was 590. The total number of literate persons in Sarpi was 3,656 (73.72% of the population over 6 years).

*For language details see Faridpur Durgapur#Language and religion

As of 2001 India census, Sarpi had a population of 8,897. Males constitute 69% of the population and females 31%. Sarpi has an average literacy rate of 38%, lower than the national average of 59.5%: male literacy is 34%, and female literacy is 48%. In Sarpi, 9% of the population is under 6 years of age.

== Infrastructure ==
According to the District Census Handbook 2011, Bardhaman, Sarpi covered an area of 5.43 km^{2}. Among the civic amenities, the protected water-supply involved overhead tank, uncovered well, hand pump. It had 469 domestic electric connections. Among the medical facilities it had 1 family welfare centre, 1 maternity and child welfare centre, 5 medicine shops. Among the educational facilities it had were 5 primary schools, other school facilities at Ichhapur, 2 km away. It had 1 non-formal education centre (Sarva Shiksha Abhiyan). Among the important commodities it produced were paddy, rice and fish.

== Economy ==
It is in the heart of the coal mining zone.

Some underground mines of Eastern Coalfields have been selected for modernisation. Mass production technology has been introduced by deploying continuous miner combined with shuttle car at Jhanjra and Sarpi projects. Tilaboni colliery would also be modernized.

== Education ==
Sarpi has one primary school.
