= Mandarbani =

- Census Town
- Location in West Bengal, India Mandarbani (India)
- Coordinates: 23.702852°N 87.310299°E
- Country: India
- State: West Bengal
- District: Paschim Bardhaman

Area
  - Total: 3.87 km^{2} (1.49 sq mi)

Population (2011)
  - Total: 4,592
  - Density: 1,190/km^{2} (3,070/sq mi)

Languages*
  - Official: Bengali, Hindi, English
- Time zone: UTC+5:30 (IST)
- PIN: 713381 (Nutandanga)
- Telephone/ STD code: 0341
- Vehicle registration: WB
- Lok Sabha constituency: Asansol
- Vidhan Sabha constituency: Pandaveswar
- Website: paschimbardhaman.co.in

Mandarbani is a census town in the Faridpur Durgapur CD block in the Durgapur subdivision of the Paschim Bardhaman district in the Indian state of West Bengal.

== Geography ==
Cities, towns and ECL Areas in the northern portion of Durgapur subdivision in Paschim Bardhaman district
MC: Municipal Corporation, CT: census town, R: rural administrative centre
Owing to space constraints in the small map, the actual locations in a larger map may vary slightly

=== Location ===
Mandarbani is located at 23°42′10″N 87°18′37″E.

Banagram, Mandarbani, Sirsha, Nabaghanapur, Sarpi and Ichhapur form a series of census towns along the western border of Faridpur-Durgapur CD block.

=== Urbanisation ===
According to the 2011 census, 79.22% of the population of the Durgapur subdivision was urban and 20.78% was rural. The Durgapur subdivision has 1 municipal corporation at Durgapur and 38 (+1 partly) census towns (partly presented in the map alongside; all places marked on the map are linked in the full-screen map).

== Demographics ==
According to the 2011 Census of India, Mandarbani had a total population of 4,592, of which 2,441 (53%) were males and 2,151 (47%) were females. Population in the age range 0–6 years was 592. The total number of literate persons in Mandabani was 2,914 (72.85% of the population over 6 years).

*For language details see Faridpur Durgapur#Language and religion

As of 2001 India census, Mandarbani had a population of 5,497. Males constitute 57% of the population and females 43%. Mandarbani has an average literacy rate of 60%, higher than the national average of 59.5%: male literacy is 70%, and female literacy is 45%. In Mandarbani, 12% of the population is under 6 years of age.

== Infrastructure ==
According to the District Census Handbook 2011, Bardhaman, Mandarbani covered an area of 3.87 km^{2}. Among the civic amenities, the protected water-supply involved overhead tank, tap water from treated sources. It had 393 domestic electric connections. Among the educational facilities it had were 2 primary schools, other school facilities at Pansali 2.5 km away.

== Economy ==
It is in the heart of the coal mining zone. As the place is located on the south bank of Ajay River many collieries pick up sand from the river bed at Mandarbani.

According to the ECL website telephone numbers, operational collieries in the Pandaveswar Area of Eastern Coalfields in 2018 are: Dalurband Colliery, Khottadih OCP, Khottadih UG, Madhaipur Colliery, Manderbony Colliery, Pandaveswar Colliery and South Samla Colliery.

== Education ==
Mandarbani has three primary and one secondary schools.

Samla Manderboni Colliery High School is a Hindi-medium coeducational institution established in 1967. It has facilities for teaching from class V to class XII. The school has a library with 130 books and a playground.

Pansuli High School is a Bengali-medium coeducational institution established in 1959. It has facilities for teaching from class V to class XII.

== Healthcare ==
The 750-bed Mandabani Hospital of Eastern Coalfields is located at Panthnagar.

Medical facilities (dispensaries) in the Pandaveswar Area of ECL are available at Pandaveswar Area PME Centre (PO Pandaveswar), Madhaipur (PO Nutundanga), Mandarboni (PO Nutundanga), South Samla (PO Pandaveswar), Pandaveswar (PO Pandaveswar), Dalurbandh (PO Pandaveswar), Khottadih (PO Khottadih), Area Dispensary (PO Pandaveswar).
