= Prayagpur =

Census town in West Bengal, India

- Census Town
- Location in West Bengal, India Prayagpur (India)
- Coordinates: 23°26′57.5″N 87°26′52.4″E
- Country: India
- State: West Bengal
- District: Paschim Bardhaman

Area
  - Total: 2.59 km^{2} (1.00 sq mi)

Population (2011)
  - Total: 4,479
  - Density: 1,730/km^{2} (4,480/sq mi)

Languages
  - Official: Bengali, English
- Time zone: UTC+5:30 (IST)
- PIN: 713148
- Telephone/ STD code: 0341
- Vehicle registration: WB
- Website: paschimbardhaman.co.in

Prayagpur is a census town in the Kanksa CD block in the Durgapur subdivision of the Paschim Bardhaman district in the Indian state of West Bengal.

== Geography ==
Cities and towns in the southern and eastern portions of Durgapur subdivision in Paschim Bardhaman district
MC: Municipal Corporation, CT: census town, R: rural centre, A: airport, B: barrage, H: historical site
Owing to space constraints in the small map, the actual locations in a larger map may vary slightly

=== Urbanisation ===
According to the 2011 census, 79.22% of the population of the Durgapur subdivision was urban and 20.78% was rural. The sole municipal corporation in the Durgapur subdivision is located at Durgapur and the subdivision has 38 (+1 partly) census towns (partly presented in the map alongside; all places marked on the map are linked in the full-screen map).

== Demographics ==
According to the 2011 Census of India, Prayagpur had a total population of 4,479, of which 2,254 (51%) were males and 2,225 (49%) were females. Population in the age range 0–6 years was 439. The total number of literate persons in Prayagpur was 3,307 (81.86% of the population over 6 years).

As of 2001 India census, Prayagpur had a population of 5149. Males constitute 52% of the population and females 48%. Prayagpur has an average literacy rate of 66%, higher than the national average of 59.5%: male literacy is 75%, and female literacy is 57%. In Prayagpur, 13% of the population is under 6 years of age.

== Infrastructure ==
According to the District Census Handbook 2011, Bardhaman, Prayagpur covered an area of 2.59 km^{2}. Among the civic amenities, it had 11 km roads, with both open and covered drains, the protected water-supply involved tap water from treated source, hand pump. It had 700 domestic electric connections. Among the medical facilities it had 1 dispensary/ health centre, 4 medicine shops. Among the educational facilities it had was 1 primary schools, other school facilities at Kanksa 6 km away. It had 1 non-formal education centre (Sarva Shiksha Abhiyan). Among the social, recreational, cultural facilities it had 1 public library and 1 reading room.

== Education ==
Prayagpur has one primary school.

== Healthcare ==
Panagarh Rural Hospital, with 30 beds, at Panagarh, is the major government medical facility in the Kanksa CD block.
