= Tilaboni =

- Village
- Location in West Bengal, India Tilaboni (India)
- Coordinates: 23°39′10.1″N 87°17′33.4″E
- Country: India
- State: West Bengal
- District: Paschim Bardhaman

Population (2011)
  - Total: 1,659

Languages*
  - Official: Bengali, Hindi, English
- Time zone: UTC+5:30 (IST)
- Telephone/STD code: 0343
- Lok Sabha constituency: Asansol
- Vidhan Sabha constituency: Pandaveswar
- Website: paschimbardhaman.co.in

Tilaboni is a village in the Faridpur Durgapur CD block in the Durgapur subdivision of the Paschim Bardhaman district in the state of West Bengal, India.

== Geography ==
Cities, towns and ECL Areas in the northern portion of Durgapur subdivision in Paschim Bardhaman district
MC: Municipal Corporation, CT: census town, R: rural administrative centre
Owing to space constraints in the small map, the actual locations in a larger map may vary slightly

=== Location ===
Tilaboni is located at 23°39′10.1″N 87°17′33.4″E.

=== Urbanisation ===
According to the 2011 census, 79.22% of the population of the Durgapur subdivision was urban and 20.78% was rural. The Durgapur subdivision has 1 municipal corporation at Durgapur and 38 (+1 partly) census towns (partly presented in the map alongside; all places marked on the map are linked in the full-screen map).

== Demographics ==
According to the 2011 Census of India, Tilaboni had a total population of 1,659, of which 855 (52%) were males and 804 (48%) were females. Population in the age range 0-6 years was 187. The total number of literate persons in Tilabani was 910 (61.82% of the population over 6 years).

*For language details see Faridpur Durgapur#Language and religion

== Economy ==
As of 2015-16, Tilaboni under ground project in Bankola Area of Eastern Coalfields has a capacity of 1.86 million tonnes per year. Tilaboni colliery has been identified for introduction of continuous miner (mass production technology).

As per the ECL website telephone numbers, operational collieries in the Bankola Area of Eastern Coalfields in 2018 are: Bankola Colliery, Khandra Colliery, Kumardih A Colliery, Kumardih B Colliery, Moira Colliery, Nakrakonda Colliery, Shankarpur Colliery, Shyamsundarpur Colliery and Tilaboni Colliery.

== Culture ==
Syed Shah Kamaluddin Kirmani dargha sharif was established at Tilaboni 500 years ago.

== Healthcare ==
Medical facilities (periodic medical examination centres and dispensaries) in the Bankola Area of ECL are available at Bankola Area PME Centre (with 30 beds + 2 cabins) (PO Ukhra), Khandra (PO Khandra), Bankola Colliery (PO Khandra), Bankola Area (PO Khandra), Shyamsundarpur (PO Khandra), Mahira (PO Moira), Tilaboni (PO Pandabeswar), Nakrakonda (PO Pandabeswar), Shankarpur (PO Sheetalpur), Kumardihi A (PO Pandabeswar), Kumardihi B (PO Pandabeswar).
