= Banagram, Paschim Bardhaman =

Banagram
- Census Town
- Location in West Bengal, India Banagram (India)
- Coordinates: 23.715252°N 87.324069°E
- Country: India
- State: West Bengal
- District: Paschim Bardhaman

Area
  - Total: 2.1956 km^{2} (0.8477 sq mi)

Population (2011)
  - Total: 5,635
  - Density: 2,566/km^{2} (6,647/sq mi)

Languages*
  - Official: Bengali, Hindi, English
- Time zone: UTC+5:30 (IST)
- PIN: 713381
- Telephone code: 0341
- Vehicle registration: WB
- Lok Sabha constituency: Asansol
- Vidhan Sabha constituency: Pandaveswar
- Website: paschimbardhaman.co.in

Banagram is a census town in the Faridpur Durgapur CD block in the Durgapur subdivision of the Paschim Bardhaman district in the Indian state of West Bengal.

== Geography ==
Cities, towns and ECL Areas in the northern portion of Durgapur subdivision in Paschim Bardhaman district
MC: Municipal Corporation, CT: census town, R: rural administrative centre
Owing to space constraints in the small map, the actual locations in a larger map may vary slightly

=== Location ===
Banagram is located at 23.715252°N 87.324069°E.

Banagram, Mandarbani, Sirsha, Nabaghanapur, Sarpi and Ichhapur form a series of census towns along the western border of Faridpur-Durgapur CD block.

=== Urbanisation ===
According to the 2011 census, 79.22% of the population of the Durgapur subdivision was urban and 20.78% was rural. The Durgapur subdivision has 1 municipal corporation at Durgapur and 38 (+1 partly) census towns (partly presented in the map alongside; all places marked on the map are linked in the full-screen map).

== Demographics ==
According to the 2011 Census of India, Banagram had a total population of 5,635 of which 2,938 (52%) were males and 2,697 (48%) were females. Population in the age range 0–6 years was 666. The total number of literate persons in Banagram was 3,431 (69.05% of the population over 6 years).

*For language details see Faridpur Durgapur#Language and religion

== Infrastructure ==
According to the District Census Handbook 2011, Bardhaman, Banagram covered an area of 2.1956 km^{2} (0.8477 sq mi). Among the civic amenities, the protected water-supply involved overhead tank, tap water from treated sources, hand pump. It had 484 domestic electric connections. Among the educational facilities it had were two primary schools, other school facilities at Pansali one kilometer away.

== Economy ==
According to the ECL website telephone numbers, operational collieries in the Pandaveswar Area of Eastern Coalfields in 2018 are: Dalurband Colliery, Khottadih OCP, Khottadih UG, Madhaipur Colliery, Manderbony Colliery, Pandaveswar Colliery and South Samla Colliery.
