= Kajora Area =

- Location in West Bengal Kajora Area (India)
- Location: 23.632407°N 87.171593°E
- Products: Non-coking coal
- Company: Eastern Coalfields Limited
- Website: http://www.easterncoal.gov.in/

Kajora Area is one of the 14 operational areas of Eastern Coalfields Limited located in Durgapur subdivision of Paschim Bardhaman district in the state of West Bengal, India.

== Geography ==
Collieries in the Kajora Area of Eastern Coalfields
U: Underground Colliery, O: Open Cast Colliery, S: Mining support, A: Administrative headquarters
Owing to space constraints in the small map, the actual locations in a larger map may vary slightly

=== Location ===
The Kajora Area is located around 23.632407°N 87.171593°E

The Kajora Area is bounded by the Kenda Area on the north, Bankola Area on the east, Andal CD Block on the south, and Kunustoria Area on the west.

The map alongside shows some of the collieries in the Area. However, as the collieries do not have individual pages, there are no links in the full screen map.

=== Coal ===
As per the Shodhganga website, collieries in the Kajora Area are: Madhupur, Madhusudanpur, Nabakajora, Madhabpur, Parascole, Jambad, Khas Kajora, Lachipur, Ghanashyam and Central Kajora.

As per ECL website telephone numbers, operational collieries in the Kajora Area in 2018 are: Central Kajora Colliery, Jambad OCP, Jambad UG, Khas Kajora Colliery, Lachipur Colliery, Madhusudanpur Colliery, Madhabpur Colliery, Naba Kajora Colliery and Porascole Colliery.

Operational Areas of ECL (Source:ENVIS Centre on Environmental Problems of Mining)

== Mining plan ==
Cluster No. 10 is in the south-eastern part of Raniganj Coalfield. The mines within the cluster are situated towards east of Asansol. Damodar River flows south of the cluster at a distance of 2 km from the nearest mine Lachipur UG of the cluster. An overview of the proposed mining activity plan in Cluster 10, a group of 19 mines in the Kunustoria Area, Bankola Area and Kajora Area, as of 2015–16, is as follows:

1. North Searsole open cast project, consisting of North Searsole underground mine, North Searsole (East) open cast patch and North Searsole (West) OC patch, with a combined peak annual capacity of 2.0 million tonnes, is expected to have a combined of 19 years. The two OC patches are expected to have expected life of 6–7 years. As of 2015–16, there was no production from the UG mine. Two OC patches were proposed to be worked within the existing leasehold of the mine. The proposed patches were to extract the developed and virgin reserves of top seams, namely Local Seam, Singran Seam, Kenda (top) and Kenda (bottom) seams.
2. Kunustoria UG mine, with peak annual capacity of 0.24 mt, is expected to have life of over 25 years. In Kunustoria UG mine, extraction of coal was being carried out in the Kenda seam by the board and pillar method where developed pillars were being depillared in conjunction with hydraulic sand stowing. Coal was loaded into tubs by SDLs. Loaded tubs are transported below ground by combination of tugger and endless haulages to feed the winding system installed at pits of Kunustoria UG unit for final transport to the surface.
3. Amrasota UG mine, with peak annual capacity of 0.15 mt, is expected to have life of more than 25 years. In Amrasota Incline, Kunustoria seam was being worked under development phase where coal was loaded into tubs by SDLs. Subsequent to completion of development phase, it was envisaged to depillar the seam in conjunction with hydraulic sand stowing. Loaded tubs are transported below ground by the main haulage of the Incline of Amrasota Unit for final transport to the surface.

Cities and towns in the southern and eastern portions of Durgapur subdivision in Paschim Bardhaman district
MC: Municipal Corporation, CT: census town, R: rural centre, A: airport, B: barrage, H: historical site
Owing to space constraints in the small map, the actual locations in a larger map may vary slightly

4. Belbaid UG mine, consisting of Belbaid UG mine and Belbaid OC patch, with a combined peak annual capacity of 0.2 mt, is expected to have a life of over 25 years. The OC patch will have expected life of 5 years. As of 2015–16, Belbaid UG mine was being obtained from Dobrana (R-V) seam workings. Development in Dobrana (R-V) seam was nearly complete and some of the panels had been depillared with stowing. Loaded tubs were transported below ground by a combination of tugger and endless haulages to feed the installed winding system for final transport to the surface. An OC patch was under operation within the limits of the colliery. At Belbaid colliery, reserves of Dobrana (R-V) seam were expected to last another 7 to 8 years. To replenish the exhaustion of production in time, it was considered necessary to plan and take advance action in this block by opening virgin Dhasul (R-IV) and Bamanbad (R-III) seams. The reserves were proposed to be extracted by stowing after developing the same.
5. Bansra UG & OC mine, consisting of Bansra UG mine and OC patch, with a combined peak annual capacity of 0.735 mt, will have expected life of over 25 years. The OC patch will have expected life of 1 year. As of 2015=16, Purandip/Jambad bottom seam (R-VIIIB) was being mined by the board and pillar method of working, through incline Nos. 3 & 4, with SDL. Development of pillars was under progress. Kenda seam (R-VI) was being worked through A & B pit unit and C pit unit by board and pillar development/depillaring using SDLs. In A&B pit unit, depillaring with stowing was being done. In C pit unit, development was being done with SDLs. Coal from the underground coal face was hauled by combination of endless and tugger haulages to feed the winding system through which coal tubs were raised up to the surface.
6. Parasea UG mine & OC patch, consisting of Parasea UG mine and OC patch, with a combined peak annual capacity of 0.61 mt, is expected to have a life of over 25 years. The OC patch will have expected life of 3 years. As of 2015–16, Kenda seam was being worked. Pillars were being developed in one part and were being depillared with stowing in the other part. Coal was being loaded both manually as well as by SDLs. Coal from the underground coal face was hauled by a combination of endless and tugger haulages to feed the winding system through which coal tubs were raised up to the surface. It had also been envisaged to exploit virgin Dobrana seam (R-V ) by deepening No.2 pit up to Dobrana seam, sinking a staple pit from Kenda seam to Dobrana seam and driving one drift from Kenda seam to Dobrana seam.
7. Parasea 6 & 7 UG mine, with a combined peak annual capacity of 0.06 mt, was expected to have a life of over 25 years. As of 2015–16, there was no production from the UG mine.
8. Jambad OC mine, with a peak annual capacity of 0.80 mt, is expected to have a life of over 25 years. As of 2015–16,-R-VIII seam was being worked in the mine.
9. Jambad UG mine, with a peak annual capacity of 0.24 mt, is expected to have a life of over 25 years. As of 2015–16, R-VI seam was being mined both from development and depillaring panels. Depillaring (splitting as final operation) was being done with stowing. Coal from the underground coal face was hauled by a combination of haulages to feed the winding system through which coal tubs were raised to the surface.
10. Nabakajora UG mine, with Madabpur UG mine (at sr. no. 11 below) has a combined peak annual capacity of 0.30 mt, is expected to have life of over 25 years. Nabakajora UG mine two units – Real Kajora (5&6 pit) unit and 7&8 pit unit. 1&2 pit unit is being used only for pumping purpose. The mine is degree-II gassy mine. As of 2015–16, the Real Kajora (5&6 pit) unit was working Sonachora (R-VIIIB) seam by manual board and pillar mining method. Depillaring with stowing is going on. The 7&8 pit unit was also working Sonachora seam (R-VIIIB) by semi-mechanized board and pillar method with SDL. Only development work was going on. Coal from the underground coal face was hauled by a combination of haulages to feed the winding system through which coal tubs were raised up to the surface.
11. Madhabpur UG mine, with Nabakajora UG mine (at sr. no. 10 above) has a combined peak annual capacity of 0.30 mt, is expected to have life of over 25 years. Madhabpur OC patch with a peak annual capacity of 0.50 mt, is expected to have a life of 15 years. Madhabpur UG mine was working Sonachora (R-VIIIB) seam by manual board and pillar method. About 50% of total property had already been caved, part of which had also been stowed. A small virgin area was being manually developed. The proposed OC patch planned to extract the virgin reserves of R-VIIIT seam, which was a developed seam. The proposed Nabakajora-Madhabpur project planned to work Kenda (R-VI) seam, thickness of which varies from 8 – 9 m. The only suitable method of work for extraction of this seam is by the board and pillar method with stowing in two sections.
12. Lachipur UG mine, with annual p. ak capacity of 0.06 mt, is expected to have a life of over 25 years. As of 2015–16, there was no production from the mine.
13. Central Kajora UG mine, with annual capacity of 0.15 mt, is expected to have a life of over 25 years. As of 2015–16, Lower Kajora (R-VIIIT) was being worked by mechanized board and pillar method, with deployment of SDLs. For development of Kajora (R-IX) seam, two pairs of rise drifts had been made from Lower Kajora (R-VIIIT) seam up to Kajora (R-IX) seam. Extraction of coal from R-IX seam was scheduled to begin soon. Coal from the underground coal face is hauled by a combination of haulages to feed the winding system through which coal tubs are raised up to the surface.
14. Khas Kajora UG mine, with peak annual capacity of 0.35 mt, is expected to have a life of over 25 years. In 2015–16, Khas Kajora UG mine was working on depillaring with sand stowing in R-VIII (T), R-VIII (B) & R-VI seams. The Chora (R-VI) seam was being worked by manual board and pillar method with depillaring and stowing. The mine is a degree-II gassy mine.
15. Moira UG mine, with an annual capacity of 0.06 mt, is expected to have life of over 25 years. In 2015–16, Moira UG mine was developing Jambad seam (R-VIII) by the board and pillar method with loading by SDLs.
16. Madhusudanpur UG mine, with peak annual capacity of 0.24 mt, is expected to have life of over 25 years. In 2015–16, Madhusudanpur UG mine was working in Kajora (R-IX) seam by the board and pillar method with mechanized depillaring and caving. While pit no. 7 was utilized for man and material, the incline was used only for coal raising through belt conveyor. The mine is degree-I gassy mine.
17. Madhujore UG mine, with peak annual capacity of 0.24 mt, is expected to have a life of over 25 years. As of 2015–16, there was no production from the mine.
18. Ghanshyam UG mine, with peak annual capacity of 0.24 mt, is expected to have a life of over 25 years. As of 2015–16, there was no production from the mine.
19. Parascole East & Parascole West UG mine, with peak annual capacity of 0.39 mt, is expected to have a life of over 25 years. As of 2015–16, the mine was working Jambad seam (R-VIII) by the board and pillar method with stowing, manually in the top section and by SDL in the bottom section. Coal from the underground coal face is hauled by a combination of haulages to feed the winding system through which coal tubs are raised up to the surface.

== Parascole West Colliery accident ==
Six persons were killed in an air blast accident on 6 July 1999 in Parascole West Colliery in Kajora Area.

== Subsidence ==
Traditionally many underground collieries have left a void after taking out the coal. As a result, almost all areas are facing subsidence. As per CMPDIL, there were 13 points of subsidence in the Kajora Area involving 370.31 hectares of land.

== Migrants ==
Prior to the advent of coal mining, the entire region was a low-productive rice crop area in what was once a part of the Jungle Mahals. The ownership of land had passed on from local adivasis to agricultural castes before mining started. However, the Santhals and the Bauris, referred to by the colonial administrators as "traditional coal cutters of Raniganj" remained attached to their lost land and left the mines for agricultural-related work, which also was more remunerative. It forced the mine-owners to bring in outside labour, mostly from Bihar, Odisha and Uttar Pradesh. In time the migrants dominated the mining and industrial scenario. The pauperization and alienation of the adivasis have been major points of social concern.

== Transport ==
The Andal–Sainthia branch line passes through this Area.
