= Sirsha, India =

Sirsha
- Census Town
- Location in West Bengal, India Sirsha (India)
- Coordinates: 23.684932°N 87.301716°E
- Country: India
- State: West Bengal
- District: Paschim Bardhaman

Area
  - Total: 5.41 km^{2} (2.09 sq mi)

Population (2011)
  - Total: 4,600
  - Density: 850/km^{2} (2,200/sq mi)

Languages*
  - Official: Bengali, Hindi, English
- Time zone: UTC+5:30 (IST)
- PIN: 713381 (Nutandanga)
- Telephone/ STD code: 0341
- Vehicle registration: WB
- Lok Sabha constituency: Asansol
- Vidhan Sabha constituency: Pandaveswar
- Website: paschimbardhaman.co.in

Sirsha is a census town in the Faridpur Durgapur CD block in the Durgapur subdivision of the Paschim Bardhaman district in the Indian state of West Bengal.

== Geography ==
Cities, towns and ECL Areas in the northern portion of Durgapur subdivision in Paschim Bardhaman district
MC: Municipal Corporation, CT: census town, R: rural administrative centre
Owing to space constraints in the small map, the actual locations in a larger map may vary slightly

=== Location ===
Sirsha is located at 23°41′06″N 87°18′06″E.

Banagram, Mandarbani, Sirsha, Nabaghanapur, Sarpi and Ichhapur form a series of census towns along the western border of Faridpur-Durgapur CD Block.

=== Urbanisation ===
According to the 2011 census, 79.22% of the population of the Durgapur subdivision was urban and 20.78% was rural. The Durgapur subdivision has 1 municipal corporation at Durgapur and 38 (+1 partly) census towns (partly presented in the map alongside; all places marked on the map are linked in the full-screen map).

== Demographics ==
According to the 2011 Census of India, Sirsha had a total population of 4,600, of which 2,436 (53%) were males and 2,164 (47%) were females. Population in the age range 0–6 years was 390. The total number of literate persons in Sirsha was 3,394 (80.62% of the population over 6 years).

*For language details see Faridpur Durgapur#Language and religion

As of 2001 India census, Sirsha had a population of 5,215. Males constitute 56% of the population and females 44%. Sirsha has an average literacy rate of 66%, higher than the national average of 59.5%: male literacy is 75%, and female literacy is 55%. In Sirsha, 12% of the population is under 6 years of age.

== Infrastructure ==
According to the District Census Handbook 2011, Bardhaman, Sirsha covered an area of 5.41 km^{2}. Among the civic amenities, the protected water-supply involved overhead tank, tap water from treated sources, uncovered well. It had 422 domestic electric connections. Among the medical facilities it had 1 medicine shop. Among the educational facilities it had were 3 primary schools, other school facilities at Kalipur 3 km away or Laudoha 2 km away. Among the important commodities it produced were paddy, wheat and mustard.

== Education ==
Sirsha has one primary school.
