= Ichhapur, Paschim Bardhaman =

Ichhapur
- Census Town
- Location in West Bengal, India Ichhapur (India)
- Coordinates: 23.611806°N 87.274611°E
- Country: India
- State: West Bengal
- District: Paschim Bardhaman

Population (2011)
  - Total: 5,795

Languages*
  - Official: Bengali, Hindi, English
- Time zone: UTC+5:30 (IST)
- PIN: 713363
- Telephone code: 0341
- Vehicle registration: WB
- Lok Sabha constituency: Asansol
- Vidhan Sabha constituency: Pandaveswar
- Website: paschimbardhaman.co.in

Ichhapur is a census town in the Faridpur Durgapur CD block in the Durgapur subdivision of the Paschim Bardhaman district in the Indian state of West Bengal.

== Geography ==
Cities, towns and ECL Areas in the northern portion of Durgapur subdivision in Paschim Bardhaman district
MC: Municipal Corporation, CT: census town, R: rural administrative centre
Owing to space constraints in the small map, the actual locations in a larger map may vary slightly

=== Location ===
Ichhapur is located at 23.611806°N 87.274611°E.

Banagram, Mandarbani, Sirsha, Nabaghanapur, Sarpi and Ichhapur form a series of census towns along the western border of Faridpur-Durgapur CD block.

=== Urbanisation ===
According to the 2011 census, 79.22% of the population of the Durgapur subdivision was urban and 20.78% was rural. The Durgapur subdivision has 1 municipal corporation at Durgapur and 38 (+1 partly) census towns (partly presented in the map alongside; all places marked on the map are linked in the full-screen map).

== Demographics ==
According to the 2011 Census of India, Ichhapur had a total population of 4,795 of which 2,483 (52%) were males and 2,312 (48%) were females. Population in the age range years was 484. The total number of literate persons in Ichhapur was 3,375 (78.29% of the population over 6 years).

*For language details see Faridpur Durgapur#Language and religion

== Infrastructure ==
According to the District Census Handbook 2011, Bardhaman, Ichhapur covered an area of 2.5324 km^{2}. Among the civic amenities, the protected water-supply involved overhead tank, uncovered well, hand pump. It had 414 domestic electric connections. Among the medical facilities it had 1 hospital, 1 dispensary/ health center, 4 medicine shops. Among the educational facilities it had were 2 primary schools, 1 middle school, 1 secondary school, 1 senior secondary school. It had 1 non-formal education centre (Sarva Shiksha Abhiyan). Among the important commodities it produced were paddy, wheat and rice.

== Economy ==
As per the ECL website telephone numbers, operational collieries in the Bankola Area of Eastern Coalfields in 2018 are: Bankola Colliery, Khandra Colliery, Kumardih A Colliery, Kumardih B Colliery, Moira Colliery, Nakrakonda Colliery, Shankarpur Colliery, Shyamsundarpur Colliery and Tilaboni Colliery.

== Education ==
Ichapur N.C. High School is a Bengali-medium coeducational institution established in 1965. It has facilities for teaching from class V to class XII. The school has 13 computers, a library with 1,500 books and a playground.

== Healthcare ==
There is a primary health centre, with 6 beds, at Lowapur, PO Ichhapur.
