= Palashban =

- Census Town
- Location in West Bengal, India Palashban (India)
- Coordinates: 23.584678°N 87.163186°E
- Country: India
- State: West Bengal
- District: Paschim Bardhaman

Area
  - Total: 2.83 km^{2} (1.09 sq mi)

Population (2011)
  - Total: 4,811
  - Density: 1,700/km^{2} (4,400/sq mi)

Languages*
  - Official: Bengali, Hindi, English
- Time zone: UTC+5:30 (IST)
- PIN: 713424
- Telephone/STD code: 0341
- Vehicle registration: WB
- Lok Sabha constituency: Asansol
- Vidhan Sabha constituency: Raniganj
- Website: paschimbardhaman.co.in

Palashban is a census town in the Andal CD block in the Durgapur subdivision of the Paschim Bardhaman district in the Indian state of West Bengal.

== Geography ==
Cities and towns in the southern and eastern portions of Durgapur subdivision in Paschim Bardhaman district
MC: Municipal Corporation, CT: census town, R: rural centre, A: airport, B: barrage, H: historical site
Owing to space constraints in the small map, the actual locations in a larger map may vary slightly

=== Location ===
Palashban is located at 23°35′05″N 87°09′47″E.

=== Urbanisation ===
According to the 2011 census, 79.22% of the population of Durgapur subdivision was urban and 20.78% was rural. Durgapur subdivision has 1 municipal corporation at Durgapur and 38 (+1 partly) census towns (partly presented in the map alongside; all places marked on the map are linked in the full-screen map).

Andal, a part of Andal (gram), Dignala, Palashban and Baska lying south of National Highway 19 (old numbering NH 2)/ Grand Trunk Road form a cluster of census towns. This cluster is linked to a cluster of census towns located north of NH 19.

== Demographics ==
According to the 2011 Census of India, Palashban had a total population of 4,811, of which 2,531 (53%) were males and 2,280 (47%) were females. Population in the age group 0–6 years was 478. The total number of literate persons in Palashban was 3,580 (82.62% of the population over 6 years).

*For language details see Andal (community development block)#Language and religion

As of 2001 India census, Palashban had a population of 4,856. Males constitute 53% of the population and females 47%. Palashban has an average literacy rate of 75%, higher than the national average of 59.5%: male literacy is 84%, and female literacy is 66%. In Palashban, 10% of the population is under 6 years of age.

== Infrastructure ==
According to the District Census Handbook 2011, Bardhaman, Palashban covered an area of 2.83 km^{2}. Among the civic amenities, the protected water-supply involved service reservoir, tube well, borewell. It had 384 domestic electric connections and 27 road lighting (points). Among the medical facilities, it had 1 hospital, 1 charitable hospital/ nursing home, 7 medicine shops. Among the educational facilities it had was 1 primary school, the other school facilities were available at Andal located nearby. Among the important commodities it produced were bricks.

== Economy ==
It is in the heart of the coal mining zone.

== Education ==
Palashban has three primary and one higher secondary schools.

Rahmatnagar Iqbal Academy is an Urdu-medium coeducational institution established in 1978. It has facilities for teaching from class V to class XII. The school has 15 computers, a library with 1,000 books and a playground.

Madanpur Mahesh Vidyamandir is a Bengali-medium coeducational institution established in 1957. It has facilities for teaching from class V to class X.
