= Baska, Andal =

Baska
- Census Town
- Location in West Bengal, India Baska (India)
- Coordinates: 23.570439°N 87.172971°E
- Country: India
- State: West Bengal
- District: Paschim Bardhaman

Population (2011)
  - Total: 6,609

Languages*
  - Official: Bengali, Hindi, English
- Time zone: UTC+5:30 (IST)
- PIN: 713321
- Telephone/STD code: 0341
- Vehicle registration: WB
- Lok Sabha constituency: Asansol
- Vidhan Sabha constituency: Raniganj
- Website: paschimbardhaman.co.in

Baska is a census town in the Andal CD block of Durgapur subdivision in Paschim Bardhaman district in the state of West Bengal, India.

== Geography ==
Cities and towns in the southern and eastern portions of Durgapur subdivision in Paschim Bardhaman district
MC: Municipal Corporation, CT: census town, R: rural centre, A: airport, B: barrage, H: historical site
Owing to space constraints in the small map, the actual locations in a larger map may vary slightly

=== Location ===
Andal, a part of Andal (gram), Dignala, Palashban and Baska lying south of National Highway 19 (old numbering NH 2)/ Grand Trunk Road form a cluster of census towns. This cluster is linked to a cluster of census towns located north of NH 19.

Baska is located at 23°34′14″N 87°10′23″E.

=== Urbanisation ===
According to the 2011 census, 79.22% of the population of the Durgapur subdivision was urban and 20.78% was rural. The Durgapur subdivision has 1 municipal corporation at Durgapur and 38 (+1 partly) census towns (partly presented in the map alongside; all places marked on the map are linked in the full-screen map).

== Demographics ==
According to the 2011 Census of India, Baska had a total population of 6,609, of which 3,462 (52%) were males and 3,147 (47%) were females. Population in the age group 0–6 years was 662. The total number of literate persons in Baska was 5,129 (86.25% of the population over 6 years).

*For language details see Andal (community development block)#Language and religion

As of 2001 India census, Baska had a population of 4,980. Males constitute 54% of the population and females 46%. Baska has an average literacy rate of 73%, higher than the national average of 59.5%; 61% of the literates are males and 39% are females. 10% of the population is under 6 years of age.

== Infrastructure ==
According to the District Census Handbook 2011, Bardhaman, Baska covered an area of 1.95 km^{2}. Among the civic amenities, it had 4 km roads with open drains, the protected water-supply involved overhead tank, hand pump, tube well, borewell. It had 591 domestic electric connections and 76 road lighting (points). Among the educational facilities it had was 1 primary school, the nearest middle school, secondary school, at Madanpur 2.5 km away. It had 1 non-formal education centre (Sarva Siksha Abhiyan). Among the social, recreational and cultural facilities it had were 2 auditorium/ community halls.

== Economy ==
It is in the heart of the coal mining zone.

== Education ==
Baska has three primary and one secondary schools.
