= Gopalpur, Paschim Bardhaman =

Gopalpur
- Census Town
- Location in West Bengal, India Gopalpur (India)
- Coordinates: 23.506199°N 87.394495°E
- Country: India
- State: West Bengal
- District: Paschim Bardhaman

Area
  - Total: 14.1196 km^{2} (5.4516 sq mi)

Population (2011)
  - Total: 15,967
  - Density: 1,130.8/km^{2} (2,928.9/sq mi)

Languages
  - Official: Bengali, English
- Time zone: UTC+5:30 (IST)
- PIN: 713212
- Telephone/ STD code: 0341
- Vehicle registration: WB
- Lok Sabha constituency: Bardhaman-Durgapur
- Vidhan Sabha constituency: Durgapur Purba
- Website: paschimbardhaman.co.in

Gopalpur is a census town in the Kanksa CD block in the Durgapur subdivision of the Paschim Bardhaman district in the Indian state of West Bengal.

== Geography ==
Cities and towns in the southern and eastern portions of Durgapur subdivision in Paschim Bardhaman district
MC: Municipal Corporation, CT: census town, R: rural centre, A: airport, B: barrage, H: historical place
Owing to space constraints in the small map, the actual locations in a larger map may vary slightly

=== Location ===
Gopalpur is located at 23.506199°N 87.394495°E.

Arra, Bamunara, Gopalpur and Amlajora form a cluster of census towns in the western portion of Kanksa CD block.

=== Urbanisation ===
According to the 2011 census, 79.22% of the population of the Durgapur subdivision was urban and 20.78% was rural. The sole municipal corporation in Durgapur subdivision is located at Durgapur and the subdivision has 38 (+1 partly) census towns (partly presented in the map alongside; all places marked on the map are linked in the full-screen map).

== Demographics ==
According to the 2011 Census of India, Gopalpur had a total population of 15,967 of which 8,126 (51%) were males and 7,841 (49%) were females. Population in the age range 0–6 years was 1,735. The total number of literates in Gopalpur was 11,405 (80.14% of the population over 6 years).

== Infrastructure ==
According to the District Census Handbook 2011, Bardhaman, Gopalpur covered an area of 14.1196 km^{2}. Among the civic amenities, it had 24 km roads with open drain, the protected water-supply involved overhead tank, tap water from treated sources, hand pump. It had 2,000 domestic electric connections. Among the medical facilities it had 2 dispensary/ health centres, 1 family welfare centre, 2 medicine shops. Among the educational facilities it had were 15 primary schools, 3 middle schools, 2 secondary schools, 2 senior secondary schools. It had 3 non-formal education centres (Sarva Shiksha Abhiyan). Among the social, recreational, cultural facilities it had 1 public library and 1 reading room. Among the important commodities it produced were rice, biri, salpata thala. It had the branch office of 1 nationalised bank.

== Education ==
Gopalpur High School is a coeducational higher secondary school established in 1854. It has arrangements for teaching from Class V to XII. The subjects taught are: Bengali, English, history, political science, geography, eco-geography, mathematics, physics, chemistry and bio science.

Birudiha High School at Gopalpur Uttarpara is a coeducational high school with arrangements for teaching from Class VI to X. It was established in 1960.
