= Bankola Area =

Area of Eastern Coalfields Limited, West Bengal, India

- Location in West Bengal Bankola Area (India)
- Location: 23.6685°N 87.2436°E
- Products: Non-coking coal
- Company: Eastern Coalfields Limited
- Website: http://www.easterncoal.gov.in/

Bankola Area is one of the 14 operational areas of Eastern Coalfields Limited located in Durgapur subdivision of Paschim Bardhaman district in the state of West Bengal, India.

== Geography ==
Collieries in the Bankola and Jhanjhra Areas of Eastern Coalfields
U: Underground colliery, O: Open cast colliery, S: Mining support, A: Administrative headquarters
Owing to space constraints in the small map, the actual locations in a larger map may vary slightly.

=== Location ===
Bankola Area is located around 23.6685°N 87.2436°E

Bankola Area is bounded by the Sonpur Bazari and Pandaveswar Area on the north, Jhanjra and Faridpur Durgapur CD Block on the east, Andal CD Block on the south, and Kajora Area and Kenda Area on the west.

The map alongside shows some of the collieries in the Areas. However, as the collieries do not have individual pages, there are no links in the full screen map. However, all places in the map of the northern portion of Durgapur subdivision, placed a little below, are linked in the full screen map.

The Pandeveswar Area, Jhanjra, Bankola Area, Kajora Area and Kunustoria Area, the easternmost operational areas of ECL, mark the end of the coal mining zone starting from the upper reaches of the Damodar in Jharkhand.

Kazi Nazrul Islam Airport is to the south of the Bankola Area.

Cities, towns and ECL Areas in the northern portion of Durgapur subdivision in Paschim Bardhaman district
MC: Municipal corporation, CT: Census town, R: Rural administrative centre
Owing to space constraints in the small map, the actual locations in a larger map may vary slightly.

=== Coal ===
According to the Shodhganga website, collieries in the Bankola Area of Eastern Coalfields are Moira, Khandra, Bankola, Shyamsundarpur, Kumardihi A, Kumardihi B, Tilaboni, Shankerpur and Shankerpur OCP.

As per ECL website telephone numbers, operational collieries in the Bankola Area in 2018 are Bankola Colliery, Khandra Colliery, Kumardih A Colliery, Kumardih B Colliery, Moira Colliery, Nakrakonda Colliery, Shankarpur Colliery, Shyamsundarpur Colliery and Tilaboni Colliery.

- See also Kenda Area#Mining plan – it includes information about Khandra and Shankarpur collieries.
- See also Pandaveswar Area#Mining plan – it includes information about Bankola, Shyamsundarpur, Kumardih, Nakrakonda and Tilaboni collieries.
- See also Kajora Area#Mining plan – it includes information about Moira colliery.

== Subsidence ==
Traditionally many underground collieries have left a void after taking out the coal. As a result, almost all areas are facing subsidence. As per CMPDIL, there were 12 points of subsidence in the Bankola Area involving 538.00 hectares of land.

== Migrants ==
Prior to the advent of coal mining, the entire region was a low-productive rice crop area in what was once a part of the Jungle Mahals. The ownership of land had passed on from local adivasis to agricultural castes before mining started. However, the Santhals and the Bauris, referred to by the colonial administrators as "traditional coal cutters of Raniganj" remained attached to their lost land and left the mines for agricultural related work, which also was more remunerative. It forced the mine-owners to bring in outside labour, mostly from Bihar, Odisha and Uttar Pradesh. In time the migrants dominated the mining and industrial scenario. The pauperization and alienation of the adivasis have been major points of social concern.

== Transport ==
The Andal-Sainthia branch line passes through the Bankola Area.

== Healthcare ==
Bankola Area Hospital has 50 beds.
