= Dignala =

- Census Town
- Location in West Bengal, India Dignala (India)
- Coordinates: 23.586015°N 87.194943°E
- Country: India
- State: West Bengal
- District: Paschim Bardhaman

Area
  - Total: 3.64 km^{2} (1.41 sq mi)

Population (2011)
  - Total: 13,633
  - Density: 3,750/km^{2} (9,700/sq mi)

Languages*
  - Official: Bengali, Hindi, English
- Time zone: UTC+5:30 (IST)
- PIN: 713321
- Telephone/STD code: 0341
- Vehicle registration: WB
- Lok Sabha constituency: Asansol
- Vidhan Sabha constituency: Raniganj
- Website: paschimbardhaman.co.in

Dignala is a census town in the Andal CD block in the Durgapur subdivision of the Paschim Bardhaman district in the state of West Bengal, India.

== Geography ==
Cities and towns in the southern and eastern portions of Durgapur subdivision in Paschim Bardhaman district
MC: Municipal Corporation, CT: census town, R: rural centre, A: airport, B: barrage, H: historical site
Owing to space constraints in the small map, the actual locations in a larger map may vary slightly

=== Location ===
Dignala is located at 23°35′10″N 87°11′42″E.

=== Urbanisation ===
According to the 2011 census, 79.22% of the population of the Durgapur subdivision was urban and 20.78% was rural. The Durgapur subdivision has 1 municipal corporation at Durgapur and 38 (+1 partly) census towns (partly presented in the map alongside; all places marked on the map are linked in the full-screen map).

Andal, a part of Andal (gram), Dignala, Palashban and Baska lying south of National Highway 19 (old numbering NH 2)/ Grand Trunk Road form a cluster of census towns. This cluster is linked to a cluster of census towns located north of NH 19.

== Demographics ==
According to the 2011 Census of India, Dignala had a total population of 13,633, of which 7,170 (53%) were males and 6,463 (47%) were females. Population in the age range 0–6 years was 1,317. The total number of literate persons in Dignala was 10,797 (87.67% of the population over 6 years).

*For language details see Andal (community development block)#Language and religion

As of 2001 India census, Dignala had a population of 12,510. Males constitute 54% of the population and females 46%. Dignala has an average literacy rate of 78%, higher than the national average of 59.5%: male literacy is 85% and, female literacy is 70%. In Dignala, 9% of the population is under 6 years of age.

== Infrastructure ==
According to the District Census Handbook 2011, Bardhaman, Dignala covered an area of 3.64 km^{2}. Among the civic amenities, it had 12 km roads, the protected water-supply involved overhead tank, tube well, borewell. It had 472 domestic electric connections and 45 road lighting (points). Among the medical facilities, it had 1 hospital, 1 dispensary/health centre, 1 nursing home. Among the educational facilities it had were 6 primary schools, 1 secondary school, 1 senior secondary school. It had 1 recognised shorthand, typewriting and vocational training institution. Among the important commodities it produced were earthen pots, well rings. It had the branch offices of 4 nationalised banks.

== Education ==
Dignala has five primary and two higher secondary schools.
