= Amlajora =

- Village
- Location in West Bengal, India Amlajora (India)
- Coordinates: 23.466199°N 87.383495°E
- Country: India
- State: West Bengal
- District: Paschim Bardhaman

Area
  - Total: 7.3168 km^{2} (2.8250 sq mi)

Population (2011)
  - Total: 5,856
  - Density: 800.3/km^{2} (2,073/sq mi)

Languages
  - Official: Bengali, English
- Time zone: UTC+5:30 (IST)
- PIN: 713212
- Telephone code: 0341
- Vehicle registration: WB
- Lok Sabha constituency: Bardhaman-Durgapur
- Vidhan Sabha constituency: Durgapur Purba
- Website: paschimbardhaman.co.in

Amlajora is a village and partly a locality in Durgapur Municipal Corporation in the Kanksa CD block in the Durgapur subdivision of the Paschim Bardhaman district in the Indian state of West Bengal.

== Geography ==
Cities and towns in the southern and eastern portions of Durgapur subdivision in Paschim Bardhaman district
MC: Municipal Corporation, CT: census town, R: rural centre, A: airport, B: barrage, H: historical site
Owing to space constraints in the small map, the actual locations in a larger map may vary slightly

=== Location ===
Amlajora is located at 23.466199°N 87.383495°E.

Arra, Bamunara, Gopalpur and Amlajora form a cluster of census towns in the western portion of Kanksa CD block and adjacent to Durgapur Municipal Corporation area.

=== Urbanisation ===
According to the 2011 census, 79.22% of the population of the Durgapur subdivision was urban and 20.78% was rural. The sole municipal corporation in the Durgapur subdivision is located at Durgapur and the subdivision has 38 (+1 partly) census towns (partly presented in the map alongside; all places marked on the map are linked in the full-screen map).

== Demographics ==
According to the 2011 Census of India, Amlajora had a total population of 5,856 of which 2,935 (50%) were males and 2,921 (50%) were females. Population in the age range 0–6 years was 660. The total number of literate persons in Amlajora was 3,625 (69.77% of the population over 6 years).

== Infrastructure ==
According to the District Census Handbook 2011, Bardhaman, Amlajora covered an area of 7.3168 km^{2}. Among the civic amenities, it had 59 km roads, the protected water-supply involved hand pump. It had 548 domestic electric connections. Among the medical facilities, it had one dispensary/ health centre, one maternity and child welfare centre, one charitable hospital/ nursing home, and 16 medicine shops. Among the educational facilities it had were six primary schools, one middle school, one secondary school, one senior secondary school. Among the social, recreational and cultural facilities, it had one public library. It had the branch offices of two nationalised banks.

== Education ==
Amlajorah High School is a Bengali-medium coeducational institution established in 1947. It has facilities for teaching from class V to class XII. The school has 18 computers and a library with 518 books.

== Healthcare ==
Panagarh Rural Hospital, with 30 beds, at Panagarh, is the major government medical facility in the Kanksa CD block.
