= Faridpur Durgapur =

Faridpur-Durgapur
- Community development block
- Location in West Bengal
- Coordinates: 23°40′04.8″N 87°18′34.2″E
- Country: India
- State: West Bengal
- District: Paschim Bardhaman
- Parliamentary constituency: Asansol
- Assembly constituency: Pandaveswar

Government
  - Type: Block
  - Block Development Officer: Debdip Bairagi

Area
  - Total: 60.22 sq mi (155.97 km^{2})
- Elevation: 354 ft (108 m)

Population (2011)
  - Total: 115,924
  - Density: 1,925.0/sq mi (743.25/km^{2})
- Time zone: UTC+5.30 (IST)
- PIN: 713381 (Natundanga)713383 (Laudoha); 713363 (Sarpi); 713377 (Gourbazar)
- Telephone/STD code: 0341
- Vehicle registration: WB-37,WB-38,WB-41,WB-42,WB-44
- Website: https://paschimbardhaman.gov.in/

Durgapur Faridpur is a community development block that forms an administrative division in Durgapur subdivision of Paschim Bardhaman district in the Indian state of West Bengal.

== History ==
Faridpur is an old village. The area was earlier densely forested. Some ancient Buddhist sculptures were discovered in the village of Pratapur under Faridpur police station. Peterson's Gazetteer of 1910 mentions five police stations under Asansol subdivision – Asansol, Raniganj, Kanksa, Barakar and Faridpur.

== Geography ==
Laudoha, a constituent gram panchayat of Durgapur-Faridpur CD Block, is located at 23°40′04.8″N 87°18′34.2″E.

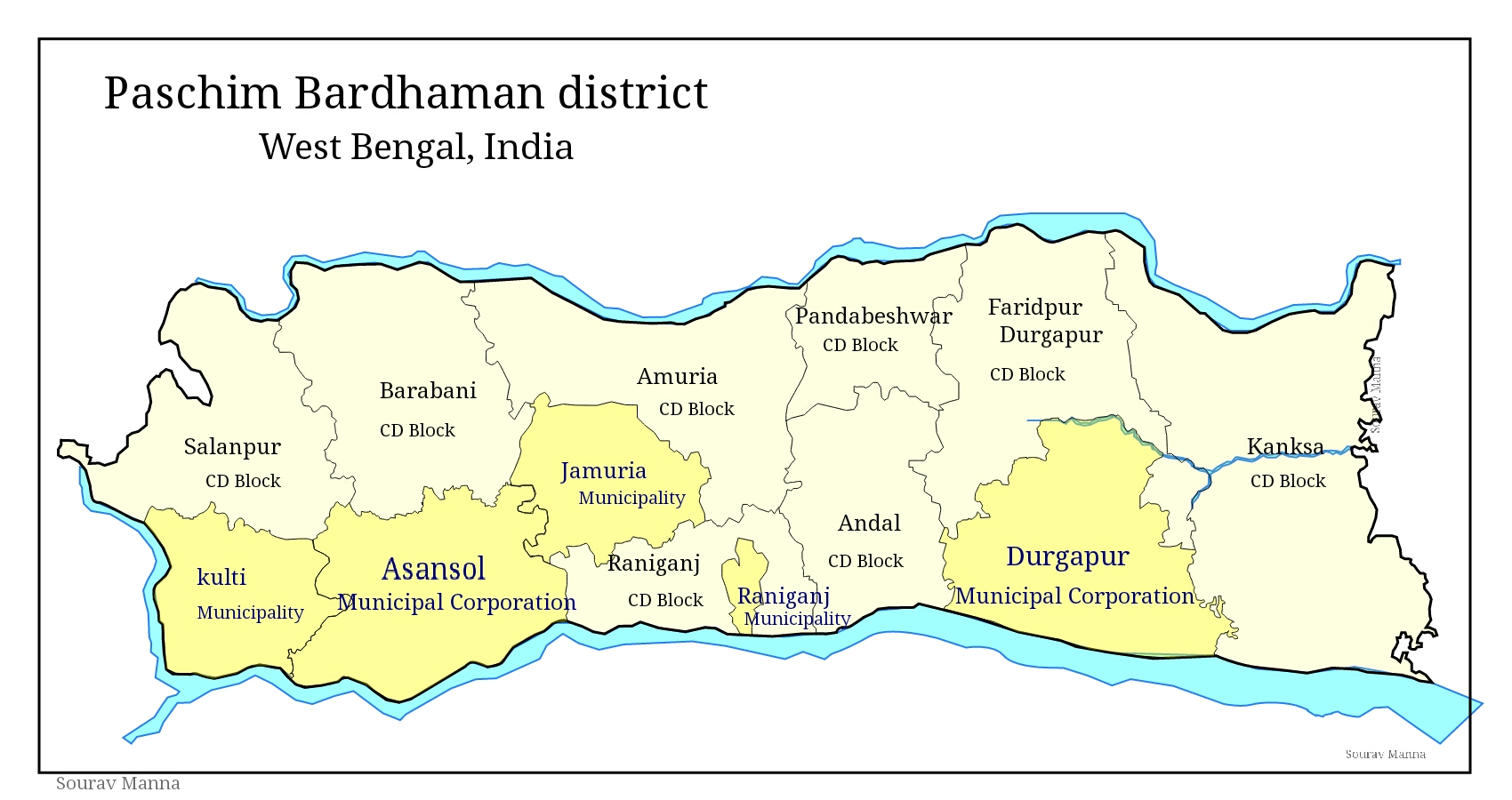
Map of Paschim Bardhaman district

The southern part of Durgapur Faridpur CD Block is part of the Ajay Damodar Barakar tract. This area is sort of an extension of the Chota Nagpur Plateau. It is a rocky undulating area with laterite soil, with the Ajay on the north, the Damodar on the south and the Barakar on the west. The northern part of the CD Block is part of the Kanksa Ketugram plain. For ages the area was heavily forested and infested with plunderers and marauders. The discovery of coal, in the eighteenth century, led to industrialisation of the area and most of the forests have been cleared.

Durgapur Faridpur CD Block is bounded by Dubrajpur and Ilambazar CD Blocks, in Birbhum district, on the north, Kanksa CD Block on the east, Durgapur (municipal corporation), with Barjora CD Block, in Bankura district, beyond it, on the south and Andal and Pandabeswar CD Blocks on the west.

Durgapur Faridpur CD Block has an area of 155.97 km^{2}. It has 1 panchayat samity, 6 gram panchayats, 88 gram sansads (village councils), 54 mouzas and 48 inhabited villages. Faridpur and New Township police stations serve this block. Headquarters of this CD Block is at Laudoha.

Kunur River, one of main tributaries of the Ajay, 112 km in length, has its origin near Bansgara in the Faridpur police station area. With water from several small streams swelling it during the monsoons, it often floods large areas of Ausgram and Mangalkot police stations. It joins the Ajay near Ujani village.

Gram panchayats of Durgapur-Faridpur block/panchayat samiti are: Gogla, Gourbazar, Ichapur, Jemua, Laudoha and Protappur.

== Demographics ==
=== Population ===
As per the 2011 Census of India Durgapur Faridpur CD Block had a total population of 115,924, of which 85,370 were rural and 30,554 were urban. There were 60,478 (52%) males and 55,446 (48%) females. Population below 6 years was 13,309. Scheduled Castes numbered 36,641 (31.61%) and Scheduled Tribes numbered 8,073 (6.96%).

As per 2001 census, Durgapur Faridpur block had a total population of 108,619, out of which 59,253 were males and 49,336 were females. Durgapur-Faridpur block registered a population growth of 19.00 per cent during the 1991-2001 decade. Decadal growth for Bardhaman district was 14.36 per cent. Decadal growth in West Bengal was 17.84 per cent. Scheduled castes at 35,692 formed around one-third the population. Scheduled tribes numbered 8,211.

Census Towns in Durgapur Faridpur CD Block are (2011 census figures in brackets): Mandarbani (4,592), Banagram (5,635), Sirsha (4,600), Nabaghanapur (5,383), Sarpi (5,549) and Ichhapur (4,795).

Large villages (with 4,000+ population) in Durgapur Faridpur CD Block are (2011 census figures in brackets):Shyamsundarpur (6,273), Jemua (5,976) and Madhaipur (5,140).

Other villages in Fardipur Durgapur CD Block are (2011census figures in brackets): Laudoha (2,399), Gogla (1,799), Pratappur (1,644), Tilaboni (1,659) and Jhanjra (2,125).

=== Literacy ===
As per the 2011 census the total number of literates in Durgapur Faridpur CD Block was 76,080 (74.14% of the population over 6 years) out of which males numbered 43,951 (82.05% of the male population over 6 years) and females numbered 32,129 (65.50% of the female population over 6 years). The gender disparity (the difference between female and male literacy rates) was 16.55%.

As per 2001 census, Durgapur-Faridpur block had a total literacy of 67.34 per cent for the 6+ age group. While male literacy was 77.94 per cent female literacy was 55.14 per cent. Bardhaman district had a total literacy of 70.18 per cent, male literacy being 78.63 per cent and female literacy being 60.95 per cent.

See also – List of West Bengal districts ranked by literacy rate

Literacy in CD blocks of
Bardhaman district
Bardhaman Sadar North subdivision
Ausgram I – 69.39%
Ausgram II – 68.00%
Bhatar – 71.56%
Burdwan I – 76.07%
Burdwan II – 74.12%
Galsi II – 70.05%
Bardhaman Sadar South subdivision
Khandaghosh – 77.28%
Raina I – 80.20%
Raina II – 81.48%
Jamalpur – 74.08%
Memari I – 74.10%
Memari II – 74.59%
Kalna subdivision
Kalna I – 75.81%
Kalna II – 76.25%
Manteswar – 73.08%
Purbasthali I – 77.59%
Purbasthali II – 70.35%
Katwa subdivision
Katwa I – 70.36%
Katwa II – 69.16%
Ketugram I – 68.00%
Ketugram II – 65.96%
Mongalkote – 67.97%
Durgapur subdivision
Andal – 77.25%
Faridpur Durgapur – 74.14%
Galsi I – 72.81%
Kanksa – 76.34%
Pandabeswar – 73.01%
Asansol subdivision
Barabani – 69.58%
Jamuria – 69.42%
Raniganj – 73.86%
Salanpur – 78.76%
2011 Census: CD Block Wise

Primary Census Abstract Data

=== Language and religion ===
Religion in Faridpur Durgapur CD block (2011)
Hinduism	85.33%
Islam	13.89%
Other or not stated	0.78%

In the 2011 census Hindus numbered 98,921 and formed 85.33% of the population in Durgapur Faridpur CD Block. Muslims numbered 16,105 and formed 13.89% of the population. Christians numbered 179 and formed 0.15% of the population. Others numbered 719 and formed 0.62% of the population.

Languages of Faridpur Durgapur CD block (2011)
1. Bengali (82.6%)
2. Hindi (10.3%)
3. Santali (5.93%)
4. Others (1.21%)

At the time of the 2011 census, 82.59% of the population spoke Bengali, 10.27% Hindi, and 5.93% Santali as their first language.

== Rural poverty ==
As per poverty estimates obtained from household survey for families living below poverty line in 2005, rural poverty in Durgapur Faridpur CD Block was 28.84%.

== Economy ==
=== Livelihood ===
Livelihood
in Faridpur Durgapur CD Block
1. Cultivators (10.3%)
2. Agricultural labourers (29.8%)
3. Household industries (2.60%)
4. Other Workers (56.6%)

In Durgapur Faridpur CD Block in 2011, amongst the class of total workers, cultivators numbered 4,405 and formed 10.35% of the total workers, agricultural labourers numbered 11,969 and formed 29.83%, household industry workers numbered 1,044 and formed 2.60% and other workers numbered 22,704 and formed 56.59%. Total workers numbered 40,122 and formed 34.61% of the total population, and non-workers numbered 75,802 and formed 65.39% of the population.

Coalmines are spread across the Andal, Pandaveswar, Raniganj, Jamuria, Barabani and Salanpur region, including municipal areas. Livelihood in this region is coal-centred. The mining area does not produce much of agricultural products. Overall work participation rate, and female work participation rate, in the mining area are low. Interestingly the work participation rate in the predominantly agricultural rural areas of erstwhile Bardhaman district is higher than in the predominantly urbanised mining area. Human development in the mining area does not at all look good. However, in the composite livelihood index the mining area performs much better than the non-mining areas of erstwhile Bardhaman district. The decadal (1991-2001) change in composition of workers shows the growing pressure of population growth, as well as of migrants from adjacent Jharkhand. Durgapur Faridpur is partly coal-mining area and partly agricultural area.

Note: In the census records a person is considered a cultivator, if the person is engaged in cultivation/ supervision of land owned by self/government/institution. When a person who works on another person's land for wages in cash or kind or share, is regarded as an agricultural labourer. Household industry is defined as an industry conducted by one or more members of the family within the household or village, and one that does not qualify for registration as a factory under the Factories Act. Other workers are persons engaged in some economic activity other than cultivators, agricultural labourers and household workers. It includes factory, mining, plantation, transport and office workers, those engaged in business and commerce, teachers, entertainment artistes and so on.

=== Infrastructure ===
All 54 or 100% of mouzas in Durgapur Faridpur CD Block were electrified by 31 March 2014.

All 54 mouzas in Durgapur Faridpur CD Block had drinking water facilities in 2013–14. There were 44 fertiliser depots, 10 seed stores and 26 fair price shops in the CD Block.

=== Coal mining ===
Some underground mines of Eastern Coalfields have been selected for modernisation. Mass production technology has been introduced by deploying continuous miner combined with shuttle car at Jhanjra and Sarpi projects. Tilaboni colliery would also be modernized. and Madhaipur OCP Has Started

See also – Pandaveswar Area of Eastern Coalfields and Jhanjra

=== Agriculture ===
Although the Bargadari Act of 1950 recognised the rights of bargadars to a higher share of crops from the land that they tilled, it was not implemented fully. Large tracts, beyond the prescribed limit of land ceiling, remained with the rich landlords. From 1977 onwards major land reforms took place in West Bengal. Land in excess of land ceiling was acquired and distributed amongst the peasants. Following land reforms land ownership pattern has undergone transformation. In 2013–14, persons engaged in agriculture in Durgapur Faridpur CD Block could be classified as follows: bargadars 16.58%, patta (document) holders 18.72%, small farmers (possessing land between 1 and 2 hectares) 4.64%, marginal farmers (possessing land up to 1 hectare) 15.67% and agricultural labourers 44.39%.

In 2003-04 net cropped area in Durgapur Faridpur CD Block was 10,127 hectares and the area in which more than one crop was grown was 4,060 hectares.

In 2013–14, Durgapur Faridpur CD Block produced 3,061 tonnes of Aman paddy, the main winter crop from 2,005 hectares, 22 tonnes of Boro paddy (spring crop) from7 hectares, 90 tonnes of wheat from 30 hectares and 1,290 tonnes of potatoes from 43 hectares. It also produced pulses and oilseeds.

In 2013–14, the total area irrigated in Durgapur Faridpur CD Block was 278.44 hectares, out of which 223.81 hectares were irrigated by canal water, and 54.63 hectares by river lift irrigation.

=== Banking ===
In 2013–14, Durgapur Faridpur CD Block had offices of 9 commercial banks and 2 gramin banks.

== Transport ==
Durgapur Faridpur CD Block has 31 originating/ terminating bus routes.

== Education ==
In 2013–14, Durgapur Faridpur CD Block had 66 primary schools with 6,574 students, 6 high school with 3,759 students and 6 higher secondary schools with 6,477 students. Durgapur Faridpur CD Block had 1 technical/ professional institution with 96 students, 192 institutions for special and non-formal education with 7,120 students

== Healthcare ==
In 2014, Durgapur Faridpur CD Block had 1 block primary health centre and 2 primary health centres with total 27 beds and 4 doctors (excluding private bodies). It had 15 family welfare subcentres. 1,487 patients were treated indoor and 82,807 patients were treated outdoor in the hospitals, health centres and subcentres of the CD Block.

Laudoha Rural Hospital, with 30 beds, at Laudoha, is the major government medical facility in the Durgapur Faridpur CD block. There are primary health centres at Lowapur, PO Ichhapur (with 6 beds) and Kantaberia, PO Dhabani (with 10 beds).

Durgapur Faridpur CD Block is one of the areas of Bardhaman district which is affected by a low level of arsenic contamination of ground water.

== Politics ==
During the period 1967 to 1972, there was an assembly constituency named Faridpur. Ajit Kumar Bandopadhyay of INC won the seat in 1972. Sanat Kumar Banerjee of CPI (M) won it in 1971. Manoranjan Bakshi of Bangla Congress won it in 1969 and 1967.
