= Bamunara, Paschim Bardhaman =

Bamunara বামুনারা
- Census Town
- Location in West Bengal, India Bamunara (India)
- Coordinates: 23.501199°N 87.363495°E
- Country: India
- State: West Bengal
- District: Paschim Bardhaman

Area
  - Total: 4.9615 km^{2} (1.9156 sq mi)

Population (2011)
  - Total: 15,967
  - Density: 3,218.2/km^{2} (8,335.0/sq mi)

Languages
  - Official: Bengali, English
- Time zone: UTC+5:30 (IST)
- PIN: 713212
- Telephone/ STD code: 0341
- Vehicle registration: WB
- Lok Sabha constituency: Bardhaman-Durgapur
- Vidhan Sabha constituency: Durgapur Purba
- Website: paschimbardhaman.co.in

Bamunara is a census town in the Kanksa CD block in the Durgapur subdivision of the Paschim Bardhaman district in the Indian state of West Bengal.

== Geography ==
Cities and towns in the southern and eastern portions of Durgapur subdivision in Paschim Bardhaman district
MC: Municipal Corporation, CT: census town, R: rural centre, A: airport, B: barrage, H: historical site
Owing to space constraints in the small map, the actual locations in a larger map may vary slightly

=== Location ===
Bamunara is located at 23.501199°N 87.363495°E.

Arra, Bamunara, Gopalpur and Amlajora form a cluster of census towns in the western portion of the Kanksa CD block and are adjacent to the Durgapur Municipal Corporation's area.

=== Urbanisation ===
According to the 2011 census, 79.22% of the population of the Durgapur subdivision was urban and 20.78% was rural. The sole municipal corporation in the Durgapur subdivision is located at Durgapur and the subdivision has 38 (+1 partly) census towns (partly presented in the map alongside; all places marked on the map are linked in the full-screen map).

== Demographics ==
According to the 2011 Census of India, Bamunara had a toal population of 6,665 of which 3,399 (51%) were males and 3,266 (49%) were females. Population in the age range 0–6 years was 728. The total number of literate persons in Bamunara was 4,584 (77.21% of the population over 6 years).

In the 2011 census, Durgapur Urban Agglomeration had a population of 581,409 out of which 301,700 were males and 279,709 were females. The 0–6 years population was 51,930. Effective literacy rate for the 7+ population was 87.70. Durgapur Urban Agglomeration included Durgapur (M. Corp), Bamunara and Arra.

== Infrastructure ==
According to the District Census Handbook 2011, Bardhaman, Bamunara covered an area of 4.9615 km^{2}. Among the civic amenities, it had 7 km roads with open drain, the protected water-supply involved overhead tank, tubewell, borewell, hand pump. It had 1,000 domestic electric connections. Among the medical facilities it had 1 family welfare centre, 1 maternity and child welfare centre, 1 charitable hospital/ nursing home, 5 medicine shops. Among the educational facilities it had were 5 primary schools, other school facilities at Gopalpur 2 km away. It had one non-formal education centre (Sarva Shiksha Abhiyan). Among the social, recreational, cultural facilities it had one public library and one reading room. Among the important commodities it produced were rice, bamboo products.

== Industry ==
Shyam Steel Industries Limited, located In Bamunara Industrial Estate, is a large open die forging unit. It has modern machining facilities, comprehensive heat treatment facilities and sophisticated metallurgical and inspection facilities.

== Transport ==
Bamunara is on National Highway 19 / Grand Trunk Road.
