= Laudoha =

- Village
- Location in West Bengal, India Laudoha (India)
- Coordinates: 23°39′43.6″N 87°18′27.4″E
- Country: India
- State: West Bengal
- District: Paschim Bardhaman
  - Rank: 2,399

Languages*
  - Official: Bengali, Hindi, English
- Time zone: UTC+5:30 (IST)
- Telephone/STD code: 0341
- Lok Sabha constituency: Asansol
- Vidhan Sabha constituency: Pandaveswar
- Website: paschimbardhaman.co.in

Laudoha is a village in the Faridpur Durgapur CD block in the Durgapur subdivision of the Paschim Bardhaman district in the state of the West Bengal, India.

== Geography ==
Cities, towns and ECL Areas in the northern portion of Durgapur subdivision in Paschim Bardhaman district
MC: Municipal Corporation, CT: census town, R: rural administrative centre
Owing to space constraints in the small map, the actual locations in a larger map may vary slightly

=== Urbanisation ===
According to the 2011 census, 79.22% of the population of the Durgapur subdivision was urban and 20.78% was rural. The Durgapur subdivision has 1 municipal corporation at Durgapur and 38 (+1 partly) census towns (partly presented in the map alongside; all places marked on the map are linked in the full-screen map).

== Civic administration ==
=== Police station ===
Faridpur police station, located on Ukhra-Madaiganj Road, in Laudoha gram panchayat, has jurisdiction over parts of the Faridpur Durgapur CD block. The area covered is 106.56 km^{2} and the population covered is 94,603.

=== CD block HQ ===
The headquarters of the Faridpur Durgapur CD block are located at Laudoha.

== Demographics ==
According to the 2011 Census of India, Laudoha had a total population of 2,399, of which 1,232 (51%) were males and 1,167 (49%) were females. Population in the age range 0-6 years was 257. The total number of literate persons in Laudoha was 1,660 (77.50% of the population over 6 years).

*For language details see Faridpur Durgapur#Language and religion

== Education ==
Laudoha K.T.B. Institution is a Bengali-medium coeducational institution established in 1963. It has facilities for teaching from class V to class XII. The school has 12 computers, a library with 2,000 books and a playground.

Kalipur High School is a Bengali-medium coeducational institution established in 1907. It has facilities for teaching from class V to class X.

== Healthcare ==
Laudoha Rural Hospital, with 30 beds, at Laudoha, is the major government medical facility in the Faridpur Durgapur CD block. There are primary health centres at Lowapur, PO Ichhapur (with 6 beds) and Kantaberia, PO Dhabani (with 10 beds).
