= Rajbandh =

- Neighborhood in Durgapur, West Bengal
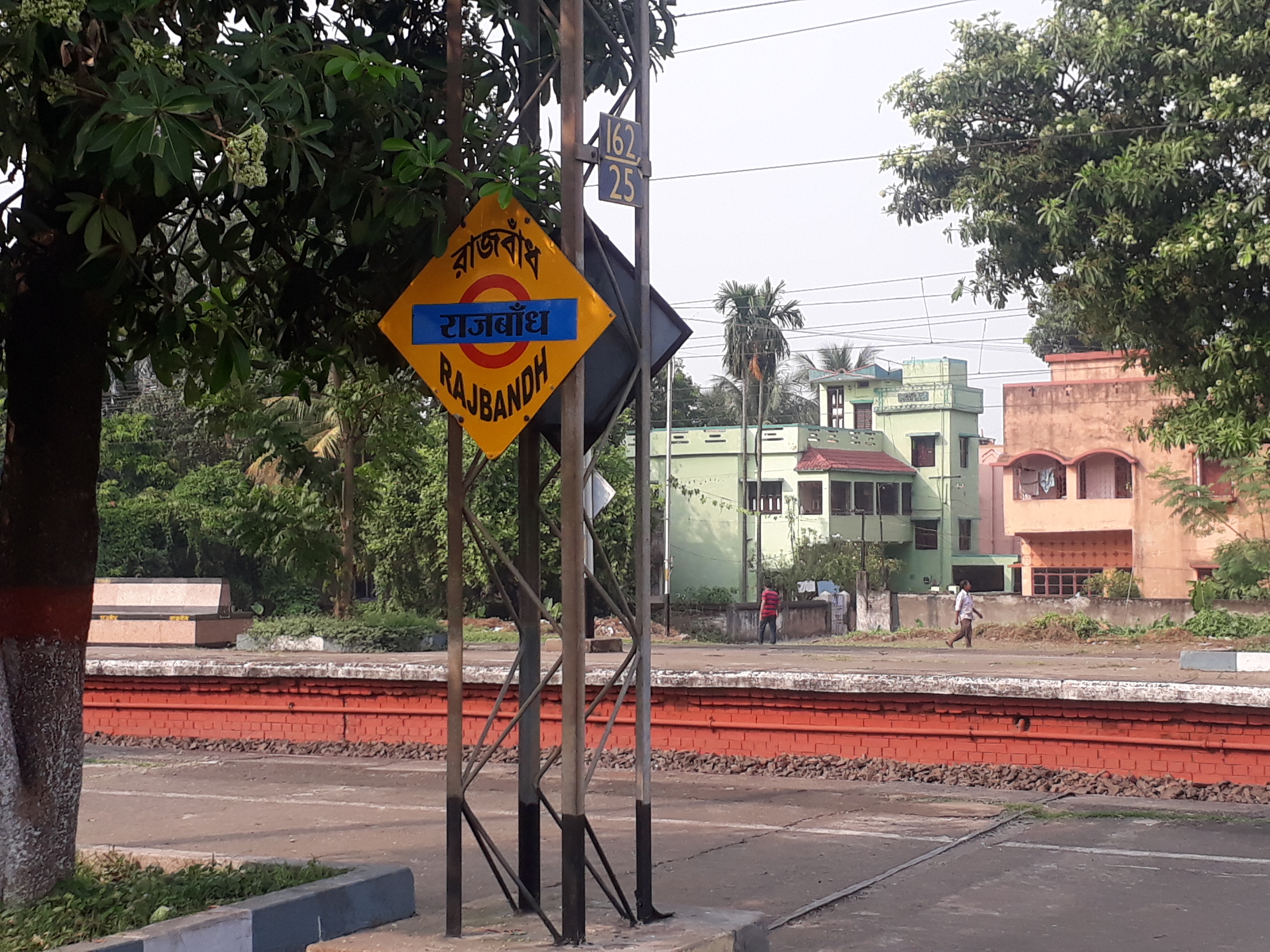
- Rajbandh railway station

- Location in West Bengal, India Rajbandh (India)
- Coordinates: 23.4781°N 87.3928°E
- Country: India
- State: West Bengal
- District: Paschim Bardhaman

Languages
  - Official: Bengali, English
- Time zone: UTC+5:30 (IST)
- PIN: 713212 (Rajbandh)
- Telephone/STD code: 0343
- Lok Sabha constituency: Bardhaman-Durgapur
- Vidhan Sabha constituency: Durgapur Purba
- Website: paschimbardhaman.co.in

Rajbandh is a neighborhood in the Kanksa CD block in the Durgapur city of the Paschim Bardhaman district in the state of West Bengal, India.

== Geography ==
Cities and towns in the southern and eastern portions of Durgapur subdivision in Paschim Bardhaman district
MC: Municipal Corporation, CT: census town, R: rural centre, A: airport, B: barrage, H: historical site
Owing to space constraints in the small map, the actual locations in a larger map may vary slightly

=== Location ===
It is about 10 km from Durgapur.

=== Urbanisation ===
According to the 2011 census, 79.22% of the population of the Durgapur subdivision was urban and 20.78% was rural. The sole municipal corporation in the Durgapur subdivision is located at Durgapur and the subdivision has 38 (+1 partly) census towns (partly presented in the map alongside; all places marked on the map are linked in the full-screen map).

== Economy ==
Indian Oil Corporation has a terminal and storage depot at Rajbandh. The 270 km Haldia-Mourigram-Rajbandh pipeline of Indian Oil Corporation, commissioned in 1972-74, transports petroleum products from Haldia refinery.

Hindustan Petroleum and Bharat Petroleum have depots at Rajbandh. Bharat Petroleum has a LPG bottling plant at Rajbandh.

== Transport ==
There is a rail station at Rajbandh on the Bardhaman-Asansol section, which is a part of Howrah-Gaya-Delhi line, Howrah-Allahabad-Mumbai line and Howrah-Delhi main line.

National Highway 19 (old numbering NH 2)/ Grand Trunk Road passes through Rajbandh.

== Education ==
Durgapur Institute of Advanced Technology and Management was established at Rajbandh in 2002. It is affiliated with Maulana Abul Kalam Azad University of Technology.

Durgapur College of Commerce and Science was established in 2003 at Rajbandh.

Gouri Devi Institute of Medical Sciences is a medical college with a 300-bedded multi-speciality health care venture, started in 2017 at Rajbandh. The hospital was established in 2012.
