= Arra, Paschim Bardhaman =

Arra
- Census Town
- Location in West Bengal, India Arra (India)
- Coordinates: 23.526199°N 87.373495°E
- Country: India
- State: West Bengal
- District: Paschim Bardhaman

Area
  - Total: 3.7312 km^{2} (1.4406 sq mi)

Population (2011)
  - Total: 7,808
  - Density: 2,093/km^{2} (5,420/sq mi)

Languages
  - Official: Bengali, English
- Time zone: UTC+5:30 (IST)
- PIN: 713212
- Telephone/STD code: 0341
- Vehicle registration: WB
- Lok Sabha constituency: Bardhaman-Durgapur
- Vidhan Sabha constituency: Durgapur Purba
- Website: paschimbardhaman.co.in

Arra is a census town in the Kanksa CD block in the Durgapur subdivision of the Paschim Bardhaman district in the Indian state of West Bengal.

== Geography ==
Cities and towns in the southern and eastern portions of Durgapur subdivision in Paschim Bardhaman district
MC: Municipal Corporation, CT: census town, R: rural centre, A: airport, B: barrage, H: Historical place
Owing to space constraints in the small map, the actual locations in a larger map may vary slightly

=== Location ===
Arra is located at 23.526199°N 87.373495°E.

Arra, Bamunara, Gopalpur and Amlajora form a cluster of census towns in the western portion of Kanksa CD block.

=== Urbanisation ===
According to the 2011 census, 79.22% of the population of the Durgapur subdivision was urban and 20.78% was rural. The sole municipal corporation in Durgapur subdivision is located at Durgapur and the subdivision has 38 (+1 partly) census towns (partly presented in the map alongside; all places marked on the map are linked in the full-screen map).

== Demographics ==
According to the 2011 Census of India, Arra had a total population of 7,808, of which 3,953 (51%) were males and 3,855 (49%) were females. Population in the age range 0–6 years was 791. The total number of literates in Arra was 5,982 (85.25% of the population over 6 years).

In the 2011 census, Durgapur Urban Agglomeration had a population of 581,409, out of which 301,700 were males and 279,709 were females. The 0–6 years population was 51,930. Effective literacy rate for the 7+ population was 87.70. Durgapur Urban Agglomeration included Durgapur (M. Corp), Bamunara and Arra.

== Infrastructure ==
According to the District Census Handbook 2011, Bardhaman, Arra covered an area of 3.7312 km^{2}. Among the civic amenities, it had 10 km roads with open drain; the protected water-supply involved overhead tank, tap water from treated sources, hand pump. It had 1,210 domestic electric connections. Among the medical facilities it had 9 dispensary/ health centres, 3 family welfare centres, 1 maternity and child welfare centre, 1 maternity home, 4 medicine shops. Among the educational facilities it had were 1 primary school; other school facilities were at Gopalpur 3 km away. It had 1 non-formal education centre (Sarva Shiksha Abhiyan).

== Culture ==
Rarheshwar Shiva temple has a unique architectural style. It is one of the ancient Shiv Mandirs in Durgapur and is also a place of historical significance. The temple is almost a thousand years old. The old Shiva temple is of the "Nagara style" category. There is also a suggestion that possibly there was an ancient city at this place.

David J. McCutchion mentions that in the reconstructed Rarheshwar Shiva temple at Arra. The temple is built in Nagara style with sandstones and laterites. The temple was originally plastered with lime and has a characteristic sikhara.
