= Kanksa =

- Census Town
- Location in West Bengal, India Kanksa (India)
- Coordinates: 23.471199°N 87.454495°E
- Country: India
- State: West Bengal
- District: Paschim Bardhaman

Area
  - Total: 8.66 km^{2} (3.34 sq mi)

Population (2011)
  - Total: 23,789
  - Density: 2,750/km^{2} (7,110/sq mi)

Languages
  - Official: Bengali, English
- Time zone: UTC+5:30 (IST)
- PIN: 713148
- Telephone/ STD code: 0341
- ISO 3166 code: IN-WB
- Vehicle registration: WB
- Lok Sabha constituency: Bardhaman-Durgapur
- Vidhan Sabha constituency: Durgapur Purba
- Website: paschimbardhaman.co.in

Kanksa is a census town and a gram panchayat in the Kanksa CD block in the Durgapur subdivision of the Paschim Bardhaman district in the Indian state of West Bengal.

== History ==
The name Kankasha comes from the name of Sadgope king Kanka Sen Rai.Who fought in the Battlefield against Bakhtiar's commander Saiyad Bukhari. As per Peterson's District Gazeteer of 1910, the south-western extremity of the Sadgop kingdom of Gopbhum was held by two kinglings, probably merely cadets of the house of Gopbhum, at Bharatpur and Kankeswar or Kanksa.

Kanksa is home to one of the oldest police stations in the area. In 1847, when Raniganj was constituted as a separate subdivision of Bardhaman district, it had three police stations under its jurisdiction - Raniganj, Kanksa and Neamatpur.

The Rarheswar Shiva temple in Arra, within Kanksa police station area, is an old one of the "nagara style " category. There also is a suggestion that there possibly was an ancient city at this place.

== Geography ==
Cities and towns in the southern and eastern portions of Durgapur subdivision in Paschim Bardhaman district
MC: Municipal Corporation, CT: census town, R: rural centre, A: airport, B: barrage, H: historical site
Owing to space constraints in the small map, the actual locations in a larger map may vary slightly

=== Location ===
Kanksa is located at 23°28′16″N 87°27′16″E.

=== Urbanisation ===
According to the 2011 census, 79.22% of the population of the Durgapur subdivision was urban and 20.78% was rural. The sole municipal corporation in the Durgapur subdivision is located at Durgapur and the subdivision has 38 (+1 partly) census towns (partly presented in the map alongside; all places marked on the map are linked in the full-screen map).

=== Gram panchayats ===
Gram panchayats under Kanksa Panchayat Samiti are: Bidbihar, Molandighi, Gopalpur, Bonkati, Tilakchandrapur, Kanksa and Amlajore.

== Civic administration ==
=== Police station ===
Kanksa police station has jurisdiction over the Kanksa CD block. The area covered is 280 km^{2}. In the police set up Kanksa PS is under the Subdivisional Police Officer of Bardhaman Sadar North subdivision.

=== CD block HQ ===
The Headquarters of Kanksa CD block is at Kanksa.

== Demographics ==
According to the 2011 Census of India, Kanksa had a total population of 23,789 of which 12,406 (52%) were males and 11,383 (48%) were females. Population in the age range of 0–6 years was 2,577. The total number of literate persons in Kanksa was 17,992 (84.82% of the population over 6 years).

== Infrastructure ==
According to the District Census Handbook 2011, Bardhaman, Kanksa covered an area of 8.66 km^{2}. Among the civic amenities, it had 18 km roads, with both open and covered drains, the protected water-supply involved overhead tank, tap water from treated source, hand pump. It had 1,892 domestic electric connections. Among the medical facilities, it had 1 charitable hospital/ nursing home, 5 medicine shops. Among the educational facilities it had were 12 primary schools, 3 middle schools, 3 secondary schools, 1 senior secondary school. Among the social, recreational, cultural facilities it had 1 cinema theatre, 1 auditorium/ community hall, 1 public library, 1 reading room. It had the branch offices of 3 nationalised banks and 1 co-operative bank.

== Transport ==
State Highway 14 passes through Kanksa. The Dubrajpur-Ilambazar sector of State Highway 14 is part of Panagarh–Morgram Highway.

== Education ==
Kanksa has six primary, one secondary and two higher secondary schools.

Kanksa High School is a Bengali-medium coeducational institution established in 1942. It has facilities for teaching from class V to class XII. The school has 1 computer, a library with 3,000 books and a playground.

Kanksa Girls’ High School is a Bengali-medium girls-only institution established in 1963. It has facilities for teaching from class V to class XII. The school has 2 computers, a library with 250 books and a playground.

== Healthcare ==
Panagarh Rural Hospital, with 30 beds, at Panagarh, is the major government medical facility in the Kanksa CD block.
