= Andal, Paschim Bardhaman =

Andal
- Census Town
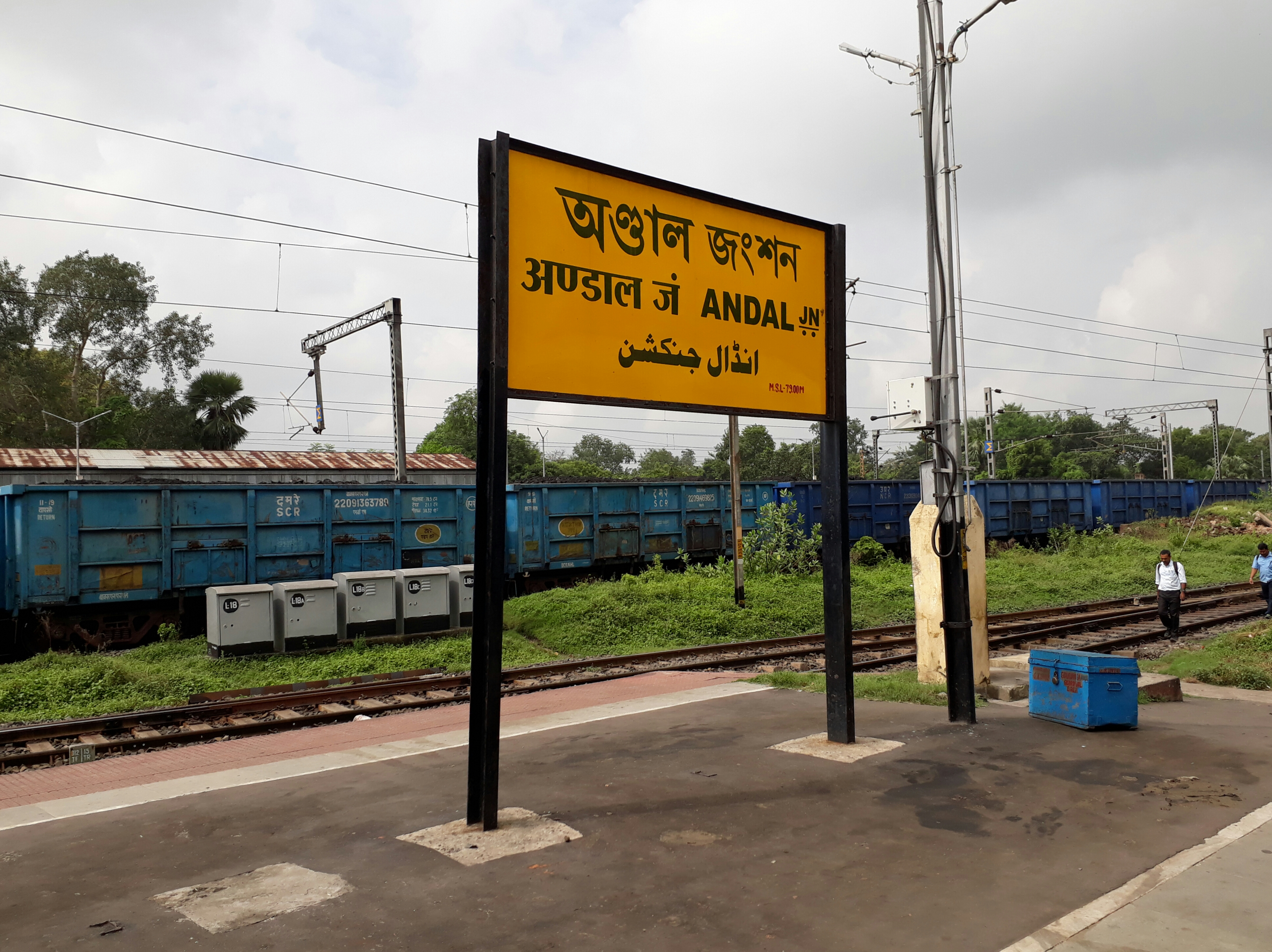
- Andal railway station

- Location in West Bengal, India Andal (India)
- Coordinates: 23.60°N 87.20°E
- Country: India
- City: Durgapur
- State: West Bengal
- District: Paschim Bardhaman

Area
  - Total: 2.77 km^{2} (1.07 sq mi)
- Elevation: 76 m (249 ft)

Population (2011)
  - Total: 19,924
  - Density: 7,190/km^{2} (18,600/sq mi)
- Time zone: UTC+5:30 (IST)
- PIN: 713321
- Telephone/STD code: 0341
- Vehicle registration: WB
- Lok Sabha constituency: Asansol
- Vidhan Sabha constituency: Raniganj
- Website: paschimbardhaman.co.in

Andal is a census town in the Andal CD block in Paschim Bardhaman district in the Indian state of West Bengal.

== Geography ==
Cities and towns in the southern and eastern portions of Durgapur subdivision in Paschim Bardhaman district
MC: Municipal Corporation, CT: census town, R: rural centre, A: airport, B: barrage, H: historical site
Owing to space constraints in the small map, the actual locations in a larger map may vary slightly

=== Location ===
Andal is located at 23.60°N 87.20°E. It has an average elevation of 76 metres (249 feet). This area lies between the Damodar River and the Ajay River.

Singaran, a small stream about 35 km long has its origin near Ikra in the Jamuria area, flows past Topsi and Andal and joins the Damodar near Waria.

=== Urbanisation ===
According to the 2011 census, 79.22% of the population of the Durgapur subdivision was urban and 20.78% was rural. The Durgapur subdivision has 1 municipal corporation at Durgapur and 38 (+1 partly) census towns (partly presented in the map alongside; all places marked on the map are linked in the full-screen map).

Andal, a part of Andal (gram), Dignala, Sankra, Palashban and Baska lying south of National Highway 19 (old numbering NH 2)/ Grand Trunk Road form a cluster of census towns. This cluster is linked to a cluster of census towns located north of NH 19.

== Civic administration ==
=== Police station ===
Andal police station has jurisdiction over parts of the Andal CD block. The area covered is 106 km^{2} and the population covered is 236,000.

== Demographics ==
According to the 2011 Census of India, Ondal had a total population of 19,924 of which 10,321 (52%) were males and 9,603 (48%) were females. Population in the age range 0–6 years was 2,176. The total number of literate persons in Ondal was 14,613 (82.34% of the population over 6 years).

*For language details see Andal (community development block)#Language and religion

As of 2001 India census, Andal had a population of 19,504. Males constitute 53% of the population and females 47%. Andal has an average literacy rate of 75%, higher than the national average of 59.5%: male literacy is 81%, and female literacy is 68%. In Andal, 11% of the population is under 6 years of age.

== Infrastructure ==
According to the District Census Handbook 2011, Bardhaman, Andal covered an area of 2.77 km^{2}. Andal (gram) covered an area of 8.8396 km^{2}. Among the civic amenities, it had 15 km roads with open drains, the protected water-supply involved overhead tank, tap water from treated sources, tube well, borewell. It had 2,000 domestic electric connections and 1,600 road lighting (points). Among the medical facilities, it had 1 dispensary/health centre. Among the educational facilities it had were 5 primary schools, 1 middle school, 1 secondary school, 1 senior secondary school, the nearest degree college at Khandra 10 km away. Among the social, recreational and cultural facilities it had were 2 public libraries. It had the branch office of 1 nationalised bank.

== Transport ==
=== Road ===
Andal is on the Grand Trunk Road or NH 19, now part of the Golden Quadrilateral.

=== Rail ===
Andal railway station is a junction as it is on the Howrah-Delhi track and is linked with Sainthia through the Andal-Sainthia branch line. There is also a track to Jasidih railway station, passing through the colliery towns of Tapasi and Jamuria and Sitarampur.

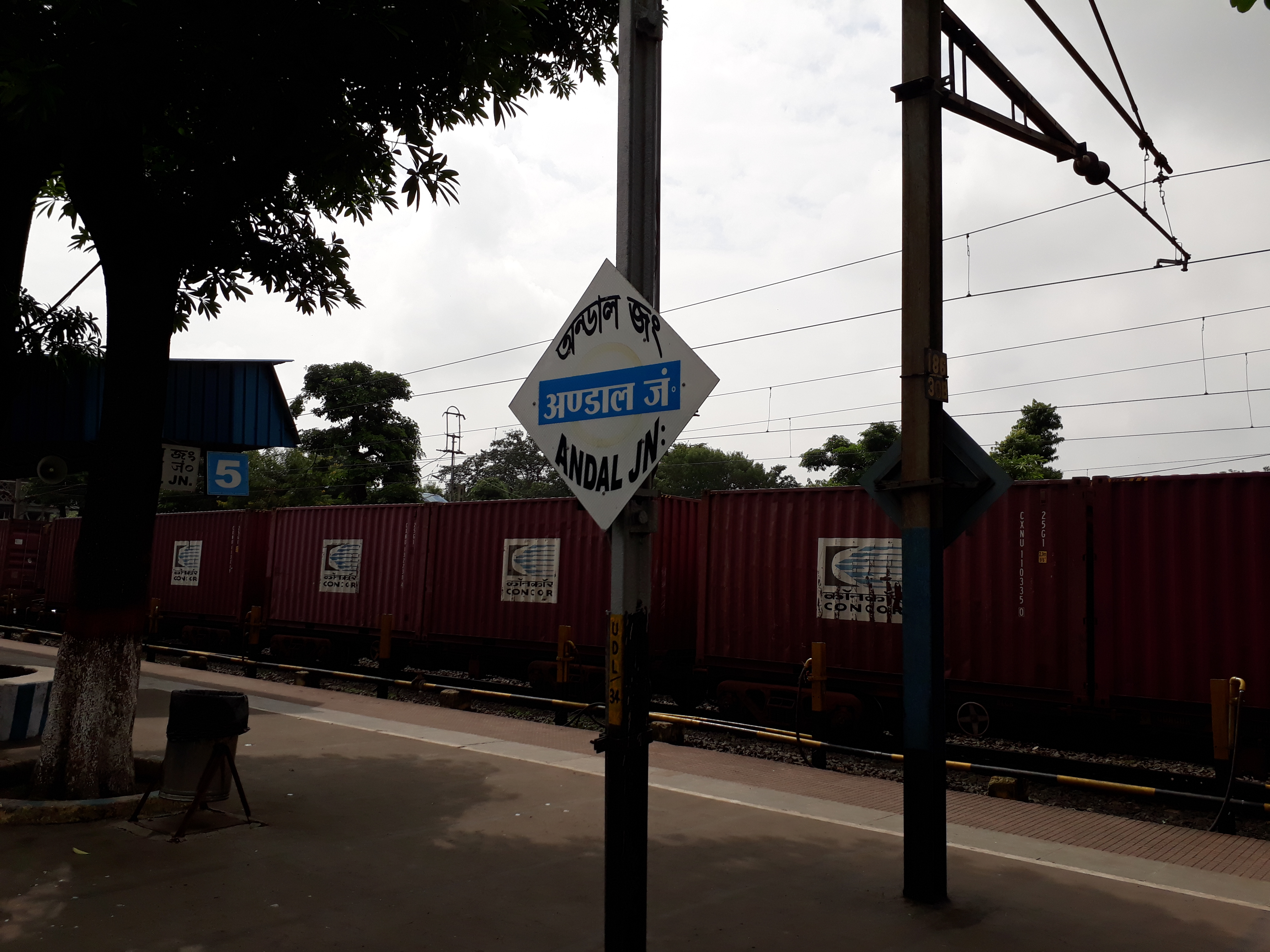
Andal Railway Station

Asansol division of Eastern Railway has the largest goods yard at Andal. The marshalling of wagons is done by a hump yard fitted with mechanical retarders.

=== Kazi Nazrul Islam Airport ===
The Union Civil Aviation Ministry and the West Bengal Government announced on 7 September 2007 plans to set up a new airport – along with a township, IT and logistics hub – at Durgapur. This earmarked the beginning of the Aerotropolis Project in Andal. Spread over approximately 2,182 acres (8.83 km^{2}), the Durgapur Aerotropolis Project is shaping up in the Asansol Durgapur Planning Area (ADPA) of Burdwan District in West Bengal.

An Integrated Township, IT Park and Logistics Hub will see the light of the day along with the Durgapur Aerotropolis Project. These will help in enhancing the growth prospects of Durgapur. BAPL has completed most of its legal procedures like receiving the In-Principle Clearance from the Ministry of Civil Aviation and getting the Land Use Development Control Plan (LUDCP) approved by Asansol Durgapur Development Authority (ADDA). It has also entered into a Technical Services Agreement with Changi Airports India Pte Ltd, Singapore. In the area both Asansol and Durgapur have airstrips for the landing of small planes. The airfield at Panagarh is under Indian Air Force.

The then chief minister of West Bengal, Mamata Banerjee announced on 25 May 2013 (Nazrul Islam's Birth Anniversary) that she has proposed to name the airport at Durgapur after the Indian Bengali poet, author, musician, freedom fighter and the National poet of Bangladesh, Kazi Nazrul Islam.

== Andal constituency ==
In the 1957 General Elections, Ondal was a dual constituency. While Ananda Gopal Mukherjee of INC won the open seat, Dwajadhari Mondal of INC won the seat reserved for Scheduled Castes. For election results in other years for the area see Ausgram and Durgapur

As per orders of the Delimitation Commission, from 2011 Andal community development block is part of Raniganj (West Bengal Vidhan Sabha constituency).

== Education ==
Ondal High School is a Bengali-medium boys only institution established in 1949. It has facilities for teaching from class V to class XII. The school has 10 computers and a library with 1,800 books.

Andal Girls' High School is a Bengali-medium girls' only institution established in 1954. It has facilities for teaching from class V to class XII. The school has 10 computers, a library with 2,600 books and a playground.

Andal Hindu Hindi Vidyalaya is a Hindi-medium coeducational institution established in 1931. It has facilities for teaching from class V to class XII. The school has 2 computers and a library with 1,000 books.

Rahmatnagar Iqbal Academy High School is an Urdu medium coeducational institution. it has facilities for teaching from class V to class XII.

Andal South Bazar Urdu Free Primary School is an Urdu medium school. It has facilities for teaching from class I to class V.

Ondal Village High School is a Bengali-medium coeducational institution established in 1869. It has facilities for teaching from class V to class X.

Andal Mahabir High School is a Hindi-medium coeducational institution established in 1969. It has facilities for teaching from class V to class X.

Traffic Colony Netaji Vidyapith is a Bengali-medium coeducational institution established in 1975. It has facilities for teaching from class V to class X.

Ondal Eastern Railway High School is an English-medium coeducational institution established in 2000. It has facilities for teaching from class I to class X.

Andal More Junior High School is a Bengali-medium coeducational institution established in 2009. It has facilities for teaching from class V to class X.

There are two English medium secondary schools named St. Mary's (Station Road) and St. Francis Xavier School.

== Healthcare ==
There is a primary health centre at Andal (with 6 beds). Ondal Railway Hospital at Andal, with 50 beds, and FCI Hospital at Andal, with 50 beds, are functional.
