= Sonpur Bazari =

Sonpu Bazari
- Villages
- Location in West Bengal, India Sonpu Bazari (India)
- Coordinates: 23°41′28.3″N 87°12′44.3″E
- Country: India
- State: West Bengal
- District: Paschim Bardhaman

Population (2011)
  - Total: 3,941

Languages*
  - Official: Bengali, Hindi English
- Time zone: UTC+5:30 (IST)
- PIN: 713378
- Telephone/STD code: 0341
- Lok Sabha constituency: Asansol
- Vidhan Sabha constituency: Pandaveswar
- Website: paschimbardhaman.co.in

Sonpur and Bazari are two villages that have lent their name to the Sonpur-Bazari open cast coal mines project in the Pandabeswar CD block in the Durgapur subdivision of the Paschim Bardhaman district in the state of West Bengal, India.

== Geography ==
Cities, towns and ECL Areas in the northern portion of Durgapur subdivision in Paschim Bardhaman district
MC: Municipal Corporation, CT: census town, R: rural administrative centre
Owing to space constraints in the small map, the actual locations in a larger map may vary slightly

== Demographics ==
According to the 2011 Census of India, Sonpur had a total population of 2,358, of which 1,187 (50%) were males and 1,171 (50%) were females. Population in the age range 0-6 years was 272. The total number of literate persons in Sonpur was 1,400 (67.11% of the population over 6 years).

According to the 2011 Census of India, Bazari had a total population of 1,583, of which 797 (50%) were males and 786 (50%) were females. Population in the age range 0-6 years was 204. The total number of literate persons in Bazari was 947 (68.67% of the population over 6 years).bazari

*For language details see Pandabeswar (community development block)#Language and religion

== Economy ==
=== Open Cast Project ===
Sonpur Bazari Open Cast Project of Eastern Coalfields was approved in 1995. The targeted output in 2016-17 was 8 million tonnes. Mineable reserve as on 1/4/2015 was 179.60 million tonnes. Balance life of the project as on 1/4/2012 was 23 years.

=== Sonpur Bazari Area ===
Sonpur Bazari OCP is the only colliery in the Sonepur Bazari Area of ECL.

See also - Pandaveswar Area#Mining plan - it includes Sonpur Bazari

== Transport ==
National Highway 14 (old number NH 60) passes in between the Sonpur and Bazari villages and near the OCP.

The nearest railway station is at Pandabeswar.

== Healthcare ==
Medical facilities (dispensary) in the Sonpur Bazari Area of ECL are available at Sonpur Bazari (PO Bahula).
