= Pandaveswar Area =

- Location in West Bengal Pandaveswar Area (India)
- Location: 23.696667°N 87.273333°E
- Products: Non-coking coal
- Company: Eastern Coalfields Limited
- Website: http://www.easterncoal.gov.in/

Pandaveswar Area is one of the 14 operational areas of the Eastern Coalfields Limited located mostly in the Durgapur subdivision of Paschim Bardhaman district with a spread over to the Suri Sadar subdivision of Birbhum district, across the Ajay, in the state of West Bengal, India.

== Geography ==
=== Location ===
The Pandaveswar Area is located around 23.696667°N 87.273333°E

The Pandaveswar Area is bounded by the rural areas of Birbhum district on the north, Faridpur Durgapur CD Block on the east, Jhanjra, Bankola Area and Sonpur Bazari on the south, and the rural areas of Pandabeswar and Jamuria CD Blocks on the west.

Collieries in the Pandaveswar Area of Eastern Coalfields
UG: Underground Colliery, OC: Open Cast Colliery, S: Mining support, A: Administrative headquarters
Owing to space constraints in the small map, the actual locations in a larger map may vary slightly
Cities, towns and ECL Areas in the northern portion of Durgapur subdivision in Paschim Bardhaman district
MC: Municipal Corporation, CT: census town, R: rural/urban administrative centre
Owing to space constraints in the small map, the actual locations in a larger map may vary slightly

The map alongside shows some of the collieries in the Pandaveswar Area. As the collieries do not have individual pages, there are no links in the full screen map. However, all places in the map of the northern portion of Durgapur subdivision, placed below, are linked in the full screen map.

=== Coal ===
As per the Shodhganga website, collieries in the Pandaveswar Area are: Madaipur, Mandarbani, Nutandanga, Pandaveswar, Dalurbandh, Kendra, Samla, South Samla, Khottadih, Kankartala, Dalurbandh OCP, Palasthali OCP and Gangaramchak OCP.

As per ECL website telephone numbers, operational collieries in the Pandaveswar Area in 2018 are: Dalurband Colliery, Khottadih OCP, Khottadih UG, Madhaipur Colliery, Manderbony Colliery, Pandaveswar Colliery and South Samla Colliery.

== Mining plan ==
An overview of the proposed mining activity plan in Cluster No. 12, consisting of 15 reconstituted mines covering Pandaveswar Area, Sonpur Bazari, Jhanjra and Bankola Area as of 2016, is as follows:

1. Pandaveswar & Dalurband underground mine and open cast project, combining Pandaveswar UG mine, Pandaveswar OC project and Dalurband UG mine & OC project, has annual production capacity of 1.47 million tonnes for UG and 2.00 mt for OC.
2. Manderboni UG mine has annual production capacity of 0.17 mt.
3. Madhaipur UG mine & OC patch has annual production capacity of 0.21 mt for UG mine and 0.57 mt for OC patch.
4. Nutandanga UG mine has annual production capacity of 0.12 mt.
5. Kendra UG mine has annual production capacity of 0.10 mt.
6. Samla UG mine has annual production capacity of 0.12 mt.
7. Sonpur Bazari OC project has annual production capacity of 12.00 mt.
8. South Samla UG mine has annual production capacity of 0.11 mt.
9. Nakrakonda and Kumardihi B UG mine & OC project, formed with the amalgamation of Nakrakonda UG mine, Nakrakonda B OC project, Nakrakonda B OC project (extension), Kumardihi B UG mine, Kumardihi B OC patch and Purushattompur OC patch, has annual production capacity of 1.12 mt for UG mine and 3.00 mt for OC project.
10. Kumardihi A UG mine has annual capacity of 0.20 mt. Kumardihi A OC patch is exhausted and being backfilled.
11. Jhanjra UG mine has annual production capacity of 5.00 mt.
12. Tilaboni UG mine has annual production capacity of 2.14 mt.
13. Shyamsundarpur UG mine has annual production capacity of 1.12 mt.
14. Bankola UG mine has annual production capacity of 0.30 mt. Bankola OC patch is exhausted and being backfilled.
15. Khottadih UG mine and OC project has annual production capacity of 0.90 mt for UG mine and 2.20 mt for OC project.
Note: Mandermoni Extension/ Rangamati A UGP and Madhaipur Extension/ Rangamati B UGP are not viable in the present time.

== Subsidence ==
Traditionally many underground collieries have left a void after taking out the coal. As a result, almost all areas are facing subsidence. As per CMPDIL, there were 6 points of subsidence in the Pandaveswar Area involving 49.62 hectares of land.

== Migrants ==
Prior to the advent of coal mining, the entire region was a low-productive rice crop area in what was once a part of the Jungle Mahals. The ownership of land had passed on from local adivasis to agricultural castes before mining started. However, the Santhals and the Bauris, referred to by the colonial administrators as "traditional coal cutters of Raniganj" remained attached to their lost land and left the mines for agricultural related work, which also was more remunerative. It forced the mine-owners to bring in outside labour, mostly from Bihar, Odisha and Uttar Pradesh. In time the migrants dominated the mining and industrial scenario. The pauperization and alienation of the adivasis have been major points of social concern.

== Transport ==
The Andal-Sainthia branch line passes through this Area.

NH 14 (old number NH 60) pass through the Pandaveswar Area.
