= Jhanjra =

Jhanjra ঝাঁজরা
- Village
- Location in West Bengal, India Jhanjra (India)
- Coordinates: 23°38′59.3″N 87°17′22.6″E
- Country: India
- State: West Bengal
- District: Paschim Bardhaman
  - Rank: 2,125

Languages
  - Official: Bengali, Hindi, English
- Time zone: UTC+5:30 (IST)
- PIN: 713385
- Telephone/STD code: 0343
- Lok Sabha constituency: Asansol
- Vidhan Sabha constituency: Pandaveswar
- Website: paschimbardhaman.co.in

Jhanjra (Bengali: ঝাঁজরা; [dʒʱãdʒra]) is a village in the Faridpur Durgapur CD block in the Durgapur subdivision of the Paschim Bardhaman district in the state of West Bengal, India.

== Geography ==
Cities, towns and ECL Areas in the northern portion of Durgapur subdivision in Paschim Bardhaman district
MC: Municipal Corporation, CT: census town, R: rural administrative centre
Owing to space constraints in the small map, the actual locations in a larger map may vary slightly
Collieries in the Bankola and Jhanjhra Areas of Eastern Coalfields
UG: Underground Colliery, OC: Open Cast Colliery, S: Mining support, A: Administrative headquarters
Owing to space constraints in the small map, the actual locations in a larger map may vary slightly

=== Location ===
The Jhanjra coal block is located on the north-eastern side of Raniganj Coalfield, 15 km north of NH 19 (old numbering NH 2)/ Grand Trunk Road and about the same distance by road from Durgapur.

=== Urbanisation ===
According to the 2011 census, 79.22% of the population of the Durgapur subdivision was urban and 20.78% was rural. The Durgapur subdivision has 1 municipal corporation at Durgapur and 38 (+1 partly) census towns (partly presented in the map alongside; all places marked on the map are linked in the full-screen map).

== Demographics ==
According to the 2011 Census of India, Jhanjra had a total population of 2,125, of which 1,098 (52%) were males and 1,027 (48%) were females. Population in the age range 0-6 years was 219. The total number of literate persons in Jhanjra was 1,496 (78.49% of the population over 6 years).

*For language details see Faridpur Durgapur#Language and religion

== Economy ==
According to the ECL website telephone numbers, operational collieries in the Jhanjra Area of Eastern Coalfields in 2018 are: Main Incline, I & II Incline, I & B Incline and 3 & 4 Incline.

== Jhanjra Project ==
The Jhanjra Area of Eastern Coalfields consists of only one colliery, the underground mechanised Jhanjra mine. The Jhanjra coal block covering a surface area of 11.50 km^{2}, spread across 8 extractable seems, has a total reserve of about 200 million tonnes of coal. Development of this mine was initiated in the 1980s. While open-cast mining is cheaper and less labour-intensive, it is much less environment friendly compared to underground mining. Therefore, although India has depended on large scale open-cast mining to raise production of coal, the Jhanjra Project is an example of its new focus on underground mining.

As of 2015-16, with the deployment of continuous miner mass production technology has been introduced in the Jhanjra mines. Longwall mining has also been introduced. Man riding system and free steered vehicle are already functional.

See also - Pandaveswar Area#Mining plan - it includes Jhanjra

== Healthcare ==
Medical facilities in the Jhanjra Area of ECL are available at Jhanjra Area Hospital (with 10 beds) {in Jhanjra Colony) and MIC Dispensary.
