= Durgapur subdivision =

- Subdivision
- Coordinates: 23.48°N 87.32°E
- Country: India
- State: West Bengal
- District: Paschim Bardhaman
- Headquarters: Durgapur

Area
  - Total: 771.28 km^{2} (297.79 sq mi)

Population
  - Total: 1,209,372
  - Density: 1,568.0/km^{2} (4,061.1/sq mi)

Languages
  - Official: Bengali, English
- Time zone: UTC+5:30 (IST)
- ISO 3166 code: ISO 3166-2:IN
- Website: http://www.sdodurgapur.org/

Durgapur subdivision is an administrative subdivision of the Paschim Bardhaman district in the state of West Bengal, India.

== Overview ==
The rocky undulating topography with laterite soil found in the western part of the district extends to the western part of Durgapur subdivision. For ages the area was heavily forested and infested with plunderers and marauders. The discovery of coal in the 18th century led to industrialisation of the western part of the subdivision. Most of the forests in the western part of the subdivision have been cleared but the eastern part remained thickly forested till more recent times and some are still there. The eastern part of the subdivision gradually slopes down to the rice plains of Bengal.

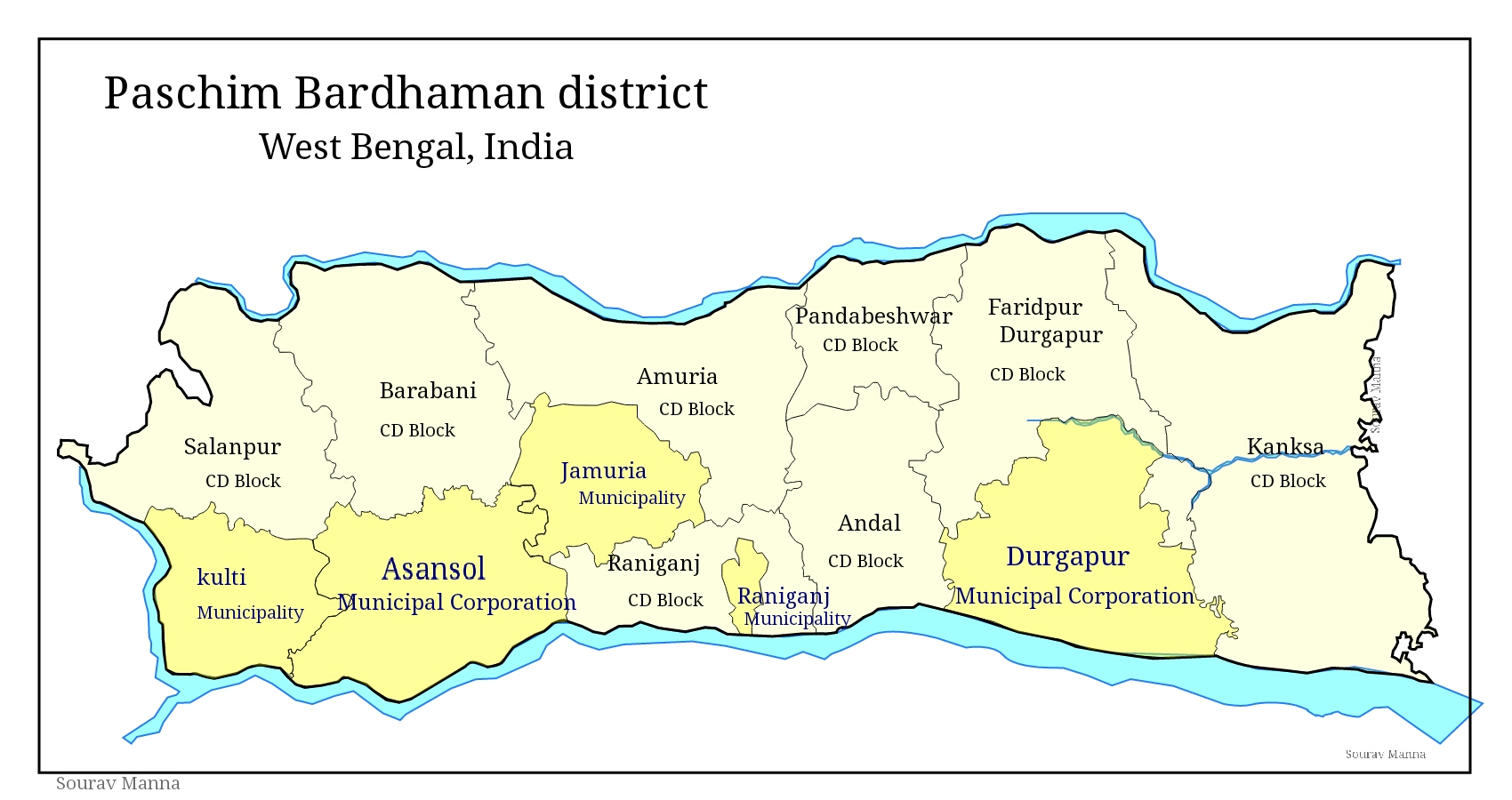
Map of Paschim Bardhaman district

== Subdivisions ==
Paschim Bardhaman district is divided into the following two administrative subdivisions:

Subdivision	Headquarters	Area km^{2}	Population (2011)	Rural population % (2011)	Urban population % (2011)
Asansol Sadar	Asansol	831.89	1,672,659	16.67	83.33
Durgapur	Durgapur	771.28	1,209,372	20.78	79.22
Paschim Bardhaman district	Asansol	1,603.17	2,882,031	18.39	81.61

Note:Before bifurcation of the erstwhile Bardhaman district Galsi I was in Durgapur subdivision, but after bifurcation it is in Bardhman Sadar North subdivision.

In the maps placed below, all places marked and linked in the full screen maps.

Cities, towns and ECL Areas in the northern portion of Durgapur subdivision in Paschim Bardhaman district
MC: Municipal Corporation, CT: census town, R: rural administrative centre
Owing to space constraints in the small map, the actual locations in a larger map may vary slightly
Cities and towns in the southern portion of Durgapur subdivision in Paschim Bardhaman district
MC: Municipal Corporation, CT: census town, R: rural centre, A: airport, B: barrage
Owing to space constraints in the small map, the actual locations in a larger map may vary slightly

== Administrative units ==
Durgapur subdivision has 6 police stations, 4 community development blocks, 4 panchayat samitis, 27 gram panchayats, 171 mouzas, 151 inhabited villages, 1 municipal corporation and 38 census towns+1 (partly). The single municipal corporation is at Durgapur. The census towns are: Siduli, Khandra, Chak Bankola, Ukhra, Mahira, Dakshin Khanda, Parashkol, Kajora, Harishpur, Palashban, Dignala, Andal (gram), Ondal, Baska, Bilpahari, Ramnagar, Dalurband, Baidyanathpur, Mahal, Konardihi, Nabgram, Sankarpur, Haripur, Chhora, Bahula, Mandarbani, Banagram, Sirsha, Nabaghanapur, Sarpi, Ichhapur, Arra, Gopalpur, Bamunara, Amlajora, Kanksa, Debipur, Prayagpur and Kendra Khottamdi (part). The subdivision has its headquarters at Durgapur.

== Demographics ==
As per the 2011 Census of India data Durgapur subdivision, after bifurcation of Bardhaman district in 2017, had a total population of 1,209,372. There were 628,883 (52%) males and 580,489 (48%) females. Population below 6 years was 130,117.

As per the 2011 census data the total number of literates in Durgapur subdivision, after bifurcation of Bardhaman district in 2017, was 867,905 (80.42% of the population over 6 years) out of which males numbered 487,056 (86.85% of the male population over 6 years) and females numbered 337,153 (65.15% of the female population over 6 years).

Religion in Durgapur subdivision
Hindu	90.15%
Muslim	8.34%
Christian	0.26%
Others	1.26%

In the 2011 census Hindus numbered 1,090,229 and formed 90.15% of the population in Durgapur subdivision. Muslims numbered 100,802 and formed 8.34% of the population. Christians numbered 3,158 and formed 0.26% of the population. Others numbered 15,183 and formed 1.26% of the population.

== Police stations ==
Police stations in Durgapur subdivision have the following features and jurisdiction:

Police station	Area covered km^{2}	Municipal town	CD Block
Andal	106	-	Andal (part)
Pandabeswar	161	-	Pandabeswar
Aurobindo	80	-	Andal (part)
Faridpur	106.56	-	Faridpur Durgapur (part)
New Township	23	Durgapur	Faridpur Durgapur (part)
Kanksa	280	-	Kanksa
Coke Oven	49	Durgapur	-

== Blocks ==
Community development blocks in Durgapur subdivision are:

CD Block	Headquarters	Area km^{2}	Population (2011)	SC %	ST %	Hindus %	Muslims %	Literacy rate %	Census Towns
Andal	Andal	84.87	186,915	28.10	4.08	90.52	8.69	77.25	12+2 (part)
Pandabeswar	Pandabeswar	97.80	161,891	30.38	6.68	86.36	12.59	73.01	11+3 (part)
Faridpur Durgapur	Laudoha	155.97	115,924	31.61	6.96	85.33	13.89	74.14	6
Kanksa	Kanksa	279.44	178,125	34.99	10.24	91.61	6.82	76.34	7

== Gram panchayats ==
The subdivision contains 36 gram panchayats under 5 community development blocks:

- Durgapur–Faridpur block consists of six gram panchayats, viz. Gaurbazar, Ichhapur, Laudoha, Gogla, Jemua and Pratappur.
- Kanksa block consists of seven gram panchayats, viz. Amlajora, Bidbehar, Kanksa, Trilokchandrapur, Bankati, Gopalpur and Molandighi.
- Andal block consists of eight gram panchayats, viz. Andal, Kajora, Madanpur, Sreerampur, Dakshinkhanda, Khandara, Ramprasadpur and Ukhra.
- Pandabeswar block consists of six gram panchayats, viz. Baidyanathpur, Chhora, Kendra, Behula, Haripur and Nabagram.

== Economy ==
=== Coal mining ===
Sonpur Bazari open cast project of Eastern Coalfields produced 6.4 million tonnes of coal in 2015–16. Eastern Coalfields has been producing around 30 million tonnes per annum from its open cast mines, it has been modernising its underground mines to produce around 10 million tonnes per annum from its underground mines. A major effort was on at its Jhanjra mines to produce 3 – 3.5 million tonnes per annum.

=== Industry ===
Durgapur Steel Plant of Steel Authority of India, set up in the fifties, has a rated capacity of 2.2 million tonnes of crude steel, after expansion and modernisation. The plant is consistently performing at beyond its rated capacity.

== Education ==
Given in the table below (data in numbers) is a comprehensive picture of the education scenario in Paschim Bardhaman district, after bifurcation of Bardhaman district in 2017, with data for the year 2013-14:

Subdivision	Primary School		Middle School		High School		Higher Secondary School		General College, Univ		Technical / Professional Instt		Non-formal Education	
Subdivision	Institution	Student	Institution	Student	Institution	Student	Institution	Student	Institution	Student	Institution	Student	Institution	Student
Asansol Sadar	678	97,084	33	4,029	57	41,686	95	109,054	8	18,463	41	8,036	1,608	45,957
Durgapur	399	62339	23	1,904	43	28,057	64	83,075	6	11,229	36	18,090	1,337	45,014
Paschim Bardhaman district	1,077	159,423	56	5,933	110	69,743	159	192,129	14	29,692	77	26,126	2,945	90,971

Note: Primary schools include junior basic schools; middle schools, high schools and higher secondary schools include madrasahs; technical schools include junior technical schools, junior government polytechnics, industrial technical institutes, industrial training centres, nursing training institutes etc.; technical and professional colleges include engineering colleges, medical colleges, para-medical institutes, management colleges, teachers training and nursing training colleges, law colleges, art colleges, music colleges etc. Special and non-formal education centres include sishu siksha kendras, madhyamik siksha kendras, centres of Rabindra mukta vidyalaya, recognised Sanskrit tols, institutions for the blind and other handicapped persons, Anganwadi centres, reformatory schools etc.

The following institutions are located in Durgapur subdivision:

- Central Mechanical Engineering Research Institute was established at Durgapur in 1958. It is the apex research and development institute for mechanical engineering under the aegis of Council of Scientific and Industrial Research and is the only national level research institute in this field.
- National Institute of Technology was established at Durgapur in 1960. It has been granted Deemed University status.
- National Power Training Institute – the eastern regional centre was established at Durgapur in 1968.
- Dr. B.C.Roy Engineering College was established at Durgapur in 2000. It is affiliated with Maulana Abul Kalam Azad University of Technology.
- Bengal College of Engineering and Technology was established at Durgapur in 2001. It is affiliated with Maulana Abul Kalam Azad University of Technology.
- Aryabhatta Institute of Engineering & Management was established at Panagarh in 2003. It is affiliated with Maulana Abul Kalam Azad University of Technology.
- Durgapur Institute of Advanced Technology and Management was established at Rajbandh in 2002. It is affiliated with Maulana Abul Kalam Azad University of Technology.
- Gouri Devi Institute of Medical Sciences is a medical college with 300-bedded multi-speciality health care venture, started in 2017 at Rajbandh. The hospital was established in 2012.
- Durgapur Government College was established at Durgapur in 1970. It is affiliated with Kazi Nazrul University.
- Durgapur Women's College was established at Durgapur in 1980. It is affiliated with Kazi Nazrul University.
- Michael Madhusudan Memorial College at Durgapur was established in 1996. It is affiliated with Kazi Nazrul University.
- Khandra College was established at Khandra in 1981. It is affiliated with Kazi Nazrul University.
- Pandaveswar College was established at Pandabeswar in 2005. It is affiliated with Kazi Nazrul University.
- Durgapur College of Commerce and Science was established in 2003 at Rajbandh.
- Ayan Arnab Sikshan Sanstha at Ajodhya, Bonkati, Panagarh offers BEd courses, was established in 2014.
- Parama B Ed College was established at Kajora in 2013.
- Mohananda College, offering B Ed course, was established at Nadiha in 2003.
- Shree Shiv Burn Hindi F. P. School, was established in 1971. Its a Co-ed School with modern facilities like Smart Classroom, Child Parliament, Computer Classes and Practical Learning.

== Healthcare ==
The table below (all data in numbers) presents an overview of the medical facilities available and patients treated in the hospitals, health centres and sub-centres in 2014 in Paschim Bardhaman district, after bifurcation of Bardhaman district in 2017, with data for the year 2013–14.

Subdivision	Health & Family Welfare Deptt, WB				Other State Govt Deptts	Local bodies	Central Govt Deptts / PSUs	NGO / Private Nursing Homes	Total	Total Number of Beds	Total Number of Doctors	Indoor Patients	Outdoor Patients
Subdivision	Hospitals	Rural Hospitals	Block Primary Health Centres	Primary Health Centres	Other State Govt Deptts	Local bodies	Central Govt Deptts / PSUs	NGO / Private Nursing Homes	Total	Total Number of Beds	Total Number of Doctors	Indoor Patients	Outdoor Patients
Asansol Sadar	1	1	6	22	2	-	14	78	124	4,399	566	113,234	1,713,044
Durgapur	1	-	3	10	1	-	9	38	62	2,034	364	79,876	1,837,026
Paschim Bardhaman district	2	1	9	32	3	-	23	116	183	9,433	930	193,110	3,550,070

=== Medical facilities ===
Durgapur subdivision has a subdivisional hospital at Durgapur. It has block primary health centres at Khandra (Ukhra), Laudoha and Panagarh, and primary health centres at Andal, Pandabeswar, Kantaberia, Molandighi, Shyambazar, Shibpur and Silampur.SAIL has a 640-bed hospital with modern facilities at Durgapur. Other hospitals in Durgapur include DPL Hospital at DPL Colony, Durgapur, DTPS Hospital at Durgapur, ESI Hospital at Bidhannagar, Durgapur, IQ City Narayan Hrudalaya Hospital at Durgapur, Lion's Club Hospital at Benachity, Durgapur, The Mission Hospital at Bidhannagar, Durgapur, Vivekananda Hospital at Bidhannagar, Durgapur and ECL's Bankola Area Hospital at Ukhra, ECL's Regional Hospital at Bahula, Mandarbani Hospital at Panthnagar.

Gouri Devi Institute of Medical Sciences is a medical college with 300-bedded multi-speciality health care venture, started in 2017 at Rajbandh. The hospital was established in 2012.

Further medical facilities in Durgapur subdivision are as follows:

Hospitals: (Name, location, beds)

- Durgapur Subdivisional Hospital, Durgapur, 200 beds
- SAIL DSP Hospital, Durgapur, 631 beds
- DPL Hospital, Durgapur, 103 beds
- DTPS Hospital, Durgapur, 30 beds
- Lions Club, Durgapur, 10 beds
- DVC Hospital, Durgapur, 30 beds
- Indian Red Cross Society Hospital, Durgapur, 30 beds
- Medical Unit-cum Hospital (RE College), Bahula, 30 beds
- Ondal Railway Hopital, Andal, 50 beds
- FCI Hospital, Andal, 50 beds
- ECL Bankola Area Hospital, Khandra, 50 beds

Rural Hospitals: (Name, CD block, location, beds)

- Khandra Rural Hospital, Andal CD block, Khandra, PO Ukhra, 30 beds
- Laudoha Rural Hospital, Durgapur Faridpur CD block, Laudoha, 30 beds
- Panagarh Rural Hospital, Kanksa CD block, Panagarh, 30 beds

Block Primary Health Centres: (Name, CD block, location, beds)

- Pandabeswar Block Primary Health Centre, Pandabeswar CD block, Pandabeswar, 10 beds

Primary Health Centres : (CD block-wise)(CD block, PHC location, beds)

- Andal CD block: Andal (6), Baska, PO Andal (10)
- Durgapur-Faridpur CD block: Lowapur, PO Ichhapur (6), Kantaberia, PO Dhabani (10)
- Kanksa CD block: Malandighi (6), Shibpur (6), Shyambazar (6), Silambazar (10)
- Durgapur MC: Angapur (6)

== Electoral constituencies ==
Lok Sabha (parliamentary) and Vidhan Sabha (state assembly) constituencies in Durgapur subdivision were as follows:

Lok Sabha constituency	Vidhan Sabha constituency	Reservation	CD Block and/or Gram panchayats and/or municipal areas
Asansol	Raniganj	None	Raniganj municipality of Asansol subdivision and Andal CD Block
	Pandaveswar	None	Pandabeswar and Faridpur Durgapur CD Blocks
	All other constituencies in Asansol subdivision		
Bardhaman-Durgapur	Durgapur Paschim	None	Ward nos. 11 – 22 and 29 – 43 of Durgapur municipal corporation
	Durgapur Purba	None	Ward nos. 1 – 10, 23 – 28 of Durgapur municipal corporation and Amlajora, Gopalpur and Molandighi gram panchayats of Kanksa CD Block
	Galsi	Reserved for SC	Galsi I CD Block, Galsi and Kurkuba gram panchayats of Galsi II CD Block outside Durgapur subdivision and Kanksa, Trilokchandrapur, Bankati and Bidbehar gram panchayats of Kanksa CD Block
	All other Vidhan Sabha segments outside Durgapur subdivision		
