= Gulzarbagh Ukhra =

Gulzarbagh-Ukhra
- Town
- Location in West Bengal, India
- Coordinates: 23.654°N 87.243°E
- Country: India
- State: West Bengal
- District: Paschim Bardhaman

Population (2001)
  - Total: 19,868

Languages
  - Official: Bengali, English
- Time zone: UTC+5:30 (IST)
- Website: bardhaman.gov.in

Gulzarbagh-Ukhra is a Minority Mohalla/Sansad under Ukhra Gram Panchayat of Andal CD Block in Durgapur subdivision of Paschim Bardhaman district in West Bengal, India.

== Geography ==
The Gulzarbagh-Ukhra of Asansol-Durgapur region is composed of undulating laterite soil. This area lies between the Damodar and the Ajay rivers which flow almost parallel to each other in the region. The average distance between the two rivers is around 30 km. For ages the area was heavily forested and infested with plunderers and marauders. The discovery of coal led to industrialisation of the area and most of the forests have been cleared.

== Demographics ==
As of 2001 India census, Gulzarbagh-Ukhra had a population of 5,000. Males constitute 53% of the population and females 47%. Gulzarbagh-Ukhra has an average literacy rate of 70%, higher than the national average of 59.5%: male literacy is 76%, and female literacy is 61%. In Gulzarbagh-Ukhra, 11% of the population is under 6 years of age.

== Politics ==
As per orders of the Delimitation Commission, Ukhra (Vidhan Sabha constituency) has ceased to be an assembly constituency from 2011. Andal community development block is part of Raniganj assembly constituency. Gulzarbagh-Ukhra is under Andal Police Station and lies under East Zone of newly formed ASANSOL DURGAPUR POLICE COMMISIONERATE.
