= Hetedoba =

Hetedoba is a small village near Durgapur in the Paschim Bardhaman district of West Bengal, India.
