= List of metropolitan cities in West Bengal =

The Indian state of West Bengal has six metropolitan cities with a population of over 500,000. More four cities are considered as secondary metropolitan or greater urban agglomerations based on their development, population and characteristics.

== List ==
No.	Metropolis	Photo	Population (2011)	Area (Km^{2})	Density	District
1	Kolkata		1,41,12,536	1,888	24000	Kolkata, North 24 Parganas, South 24 Parganas, Nadia, Howrah, Hooghly
2	Asansol		12,43,008	1,615	3,812.90	Paschim Bardhaman
3	Siliguri		11,91,000	2,222	1,510.62	Darjeeling, Jalpaiguri
4	Durgapur		5,80,000	1,550	3,392.96	Paschim Bardhaman
5	Bardhaman		5,22,445	157	3,327.68	Purba Bardhaman
6	Malda		4,00,295	206	1,933.79	Malda
7	Berhampore		305,609	194	6,365.37	Murshidabad
8	Kharagpur		293,719	127	1,884.80	West Medinipur
9	Basirhat		206,000	56	8,400.45	North 24 Parganas
10	Haldia		200,762	198	1,841.85	East Medinipur
