= Alok Krishna Gupta =

Indian mineralogist and petrologist

- Born: 4 December 1942 (age 83); Sanctoria, Paschim Bardhaman district, West Bengal, India
- Education: Jadavpur University; University of Pittsburgh; University of Western Ontario; Ruhr University; Hokkaido University
- Known for: Studies on the genesis of alkaline rocks
- Awards: 1981 UGC Career Award; 1986 Shanti Swarup Bhatnagar Prize; 1999 UoA Best Teacher Award; 2009 ISCA Birbal Sahni Birth Centenary Award
- Scientific career
- Fields: Mineralogy; Petrology
- Workplaces: University of Pittsburgh; University of Roorkee; University of Allahabad; University of Melbourne; University of Tasmania; University of Texas at Dallas; University of Bristol; Chernogolovka
- Doctoral advisor: William Fyfe; N. D. Chatterjee; Kenzo Yagi

Alok Krishna Gupta (born 4 December 1942) is an Indian mineralogist, petrologist and a former Raja Ramanna Fellow of the Department of Atomic Energy at the National Centre of Experimental Mineralogy and Petrology of the University of Allahabad. He is known for his studies on the genesis of alkaline rocks and is an elected fellow of all three major Indian science academies viz. the National Academy of Sciences, India, Indian National Science Academy and the Indian Academy of Sciences. The Council of Scientific and Industrial Research, the apex agency of the Government of India for scientific research, awarded him the Shanti Swarup Bhatnagar Prize for Science and Technology, one of the highest Indian science awards for his contributions to Earth, Atmosphere, Ocean and Planetary Sciences in 1986.

== Biography ==
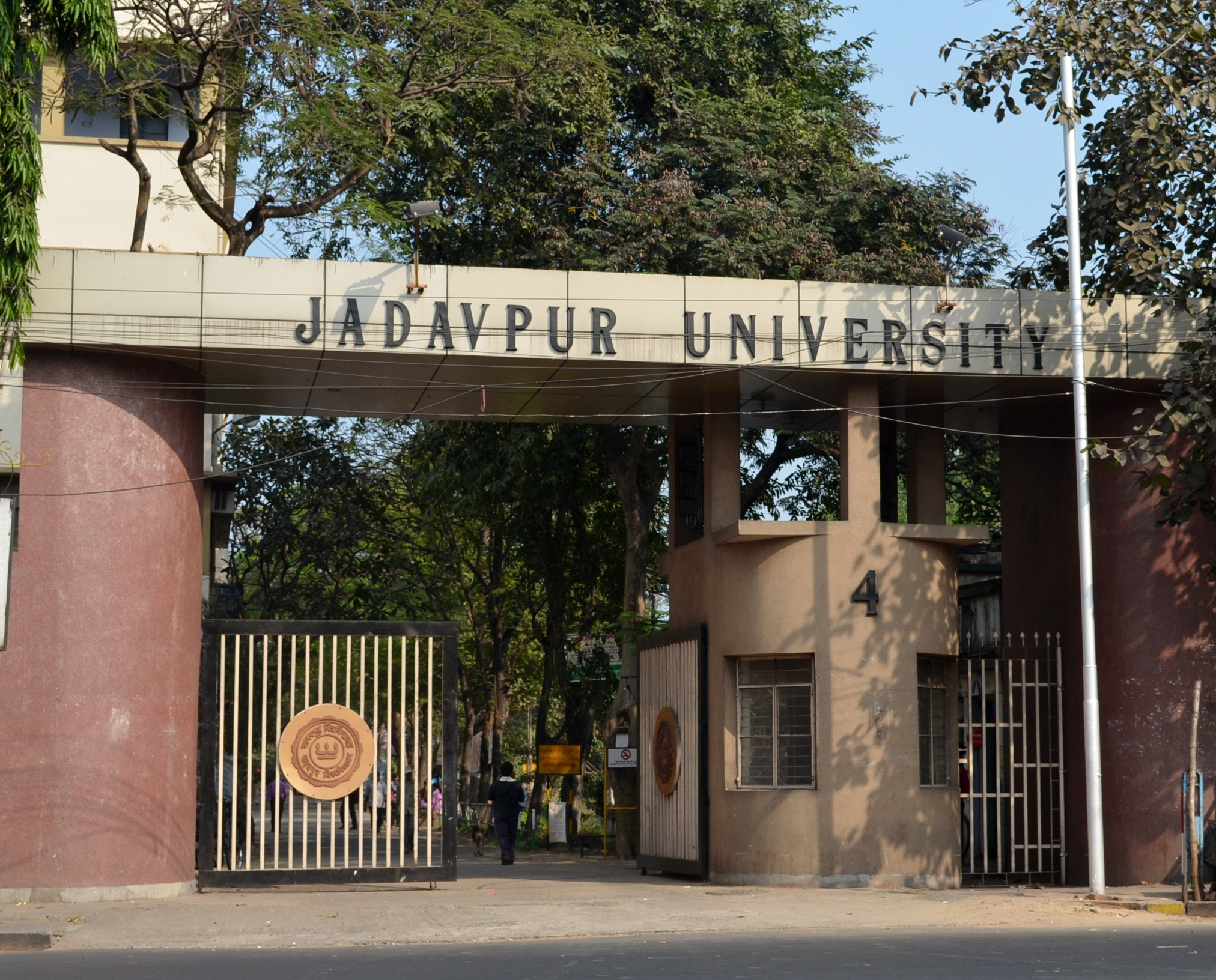
Jadavpur University

A. K. Gupta, born on 4 December 1942 in Sanctoria in Paschim Bardhaman district of the Indian state of West Bengal, graduated in science from Jadavpur University and after completing his master's degree from the same institution, moved to the US to start his career as a teaching assistant at the University of Western Ontario. Simultaneously, he did his post-doctoral work under the guidance of William Fyfe and in 1975, he moved to Ruhr University to work with N. D. Chatterjee where he stayed for one year before joining Kenzō Yagi at Hokkaido University in 1975. Returning to India, he joined the University of Roorkee in 1978 as a member of faculty and his tenure there lasted till 1985 when he was appointed as a professor at the University of Allahabad. He served out his service at Allahabad University during which time he also served as a visiting professor at several universities viz. University of Melbourne (1979–80), University of Tasmania (1983), University of Texas at Dallas (1994), University of Bristol (1999) and Chernogolovka, Moscow (1987, 1998).

Gupta is married to Chhaya and the couple has two sons. The family lives in Allahabad.

== Legacy ==
Gupta's researches have been focused on petrology and mineralogy and he is known to have pioneered the field of experimental petrology in India. He is reported to have done extensive work on the genesis of alkaline rocks and has experimentally proved the genesis of pseudoleucite, ultrapotassic rocks and analcime. His studies have been detailed in two books, Petrology and Genesis of Leucite-bearing Rocks and Young Potassic Rocks as well as several peer reviewed articles; (Note: Please see Selected bibliography section) the online article repository of the Indian Academy of Sciences has listed a number of them. He was the first professor of the Department of Earth and Planetary Sciences of the University of Allahabad and has contributed to the establishment of the National Centre of Experimental Mineralogy and Petrology, Allahabad where he served as a director. He also served as the vice president of the Indian News Science Association and the Indian National Science Academy during 2007–09.

== Awards and honors ==
Gupta received the Career Award of the University Grants Commission of India in 1991; UGC would honor him again with the National lectureship in 1986. The Council of Scientific and Industrial Research awarded him the Shanti Swarup Bhatnagar Prize, one of the highest Indian science awards, in 1986. In 1999, University of Allahabad awarded him the Best Teacher Award and he received the Birbal Sahni Birth Centenary Award of the Indian Science Congress Association in 2009. The National Academy of Sciences, India elected him as a fellow in 1988 and the Indian National Science Academy and Indian Academy of Sciences followed suit in 1991 and 1994 respectively. The Department of Atomic Energy selected him as the Raja Ramanna Fellow in 2011, the same year as he delivered the Jawaharlal Nehru Birth Centenary Lecture of the Indian National Science Academy. The other award orations delivered by him include Prof. K.P. Rhode Memorial lecture and P. N. Dutta Memorial Lecture.

== Selected bibliography ==
=== Books ===
- Alok K. Gupta; W. S. Fyfe (2003). The Young Potassic Rocks. Ane Books. ISBN 978-81-8052-002-0.
- A. K. Gupta; K. Yagi (6 December 2012). Petrology and Genesis of Leucite-Bearing Rocks. Springer Science & Business Media. ISBN 978-3-642-67550-8.

=== Articles ===
- Gupta, A. K.; Yagi, Kenzo (1978). "Experimental investigation on forsterite-grossularite incompatibility in presence of excess water". Bulletin of Volcanology. 41 (4): 657–663. Bibcode:1978BVol...41..657G. doi:10.1007/BF02597391. S2CID 129236990.
- Agrawal, Snehmani; Bindal, M. M.; Gupta, Alok K. (1990). "High pressure-temperature studies on an olivine tholeiite and a tholeiitic picrite from the pavagarh region, Gujarat, India". Proceedings of the Indian Academy of Sciences - Earth and Planetary Sciences. 99 (1): 91–98. Bibcode:1990InEPS..99...91A. doi:10.1007/BF02871898.
- Kar, Ruchira; Gupta, Alok K. (1993). "Experimental studies on the system Phlogopite-Mn-Phlogopite at 1 and 10 kbars and variable temperatures in presence of excess water under nno buffer conditions". National Academy Science Letters. 16 (1): 17–21.
- Gupta, Alok K. (1996). "Evolution of the earth's mantle and core: convective cycle within the mantle and different plate tectonic environments related to magma generation". Current Science. 70 (11): 961–969.
- Pati, Jayantha K.; Arima, Makoto; Gupta, Alok K. (2000). "Experimental study of the system diopside- albite -nepheline at P(H2O)= P(total)= 2 and 10 kbar and at P(total)= 28 kbar". Canadian Mineralogist. 38 (5): 1177–1191. Bibcode:2000CaMin..38.1177P. doi:10.2113/gscanmin.38.5.1177.

== See also ==
- Ultrapotassic igneous rocks
- Analcime
