= Kajora =

- Census Town
- Location in West Bengal, India Kajora (India)
- Coordinates: 23.613307°N 87.182583°E
- Country: India
- State: West Bengal
- District: Paschim Bardhaman

Area
  - Total: 10.33 km^{2} (3.99 sq mi)

Population (2011)
  - Total: 27,275
  - Density: 2,640/km^{2} (6,839/sq mi)

Languages*
  - Official: Bengali, Hindi, English
- Time zone: UTC+5:30 (IST)
- PIN: 713338
- Telephone/STD code: 0341
- Vehicle registration: WB
- Lok Sabha constituency: Asansol
- Vidhan Sabha constituency: Raniganj
- Website: paschimbardhaman.co.in

Kajora is a census town in the Andal CD block in the Durgapur subdivision of the Paschim Bardhaman district in the Indian state of West Bengal.

== Geography ==
Cities and towns in the southern and eastern portions of Durgapur subdivision in Paschim Bardhaman district
MC: Municipal Corporation, CT: census town, R: rural centre, A: airport, B: barrage, H: historical site
Owing to space constraints in the small map, the actual locations in a larger map may vary slightly

=== Location ===
Kajora is located at 23°36′48″N 87°10′57″E.

=== Urbanisation ===
According to the 2011 census, 79.22% of the population of the Durgapur subdivision was urban and 20.78% was rural. The sole municipal corporation in Durgapur subdivision is located at Durgapur and the subdivision has 38 (+1 partly) census towns (partly presented in the map alongside; all places marked on the map are linked in the full-screen map).

Siduli, Khandra, Ukhra, Mahira, Dakshin Khanda, Harishpur, Kajora, a part of Andal (gram), (all in Andal CD Block), Parashkol (partly in Pandabeswar CD block and partly in Andal CD block) and Chak Bankola (partly in Pandabeswar CD block and partly in Andal CD block), lying north of National Highway 19 (old numbering NH 2)/ Grand Trunk Road form a cluster of census towns. This cluster is linked with two more clusters of census towns – one located south of NH 19 in Andal CD block and another lying in Pandabeswar CD block.

== Demographics ==
According to the 2011 Census of India, Kajora had a total population of 27,275, of which 14,444 (53%) were males and 12,831 (47%) were females. Population in the age group 0–6 years was 3,269. The total number of literate persons in Kajora was 16,539 (68.90% of the population over 6 years).

*For language details see Andal (community development block)#Language and religion

As of 2001 India census, Kajora had a population of 24,955. Males constitute 55% of the population and females 45%. Kajora has an average literacy rate of 54%, lower than the national average of 59.5%: male literacy is 62%, and female literacy is 43%. In Kajora, 12% of the population is under 6 years of age.

== Infrastructure ==
According to the District Census Handbook 2011, Bardhaman, Kajora covered an area of 10.33 km^{2}. Among the civic amenities, the protected water-supply involved overhead tank, tap water from treated sources (Still not available at kajora Gram in an adequate manner). It had 2,246 domestic electric connections. The nearest government medical facilities are 1–2 km away. Among the educational facilities it had were 6 primary schools, 1 middle school, 2 senior secondary schools. Among the social, recreational and cultural facilities it had 1 public library and 1 reading room. It had the branch office of 1 nationalised bank.

== Economy ==
Kajora is a coal mining area. One of the area headquarters of Eastern Coalfields Ltd., a subsidiary of Coal India Limited is located here.

Collieries in the Kajora Area of Eastern Coalfields are: Madhupur, Madhusudanpur, Nabakajora, Madhabpur, Parascole, Jambad, Khas Kajora, Lachipur, Ghanashyam and Central Kajora.

== Transport ==
Kajora is on Grand Trunk Road or NH 19. Kajoragram railway station is 5 km from Andal on the Andal-Sainthia Branch Line of Eastern Railway.

== Education ==
Kajora has six primary, one secondary and one higher secondary schools.

== Healthcare ==
Kajora has medical facilities with basic fundamental amenities.
