= Harishpur =

- Census Town
- Location in West Bengal, India Harishpur (India)
- Coordinates: 23°36′16.9″N 87°10′45.5″E
- Country: India
- State: West Bengal
- District: Paschim Bardhaman

Area
  - Total: 2.44 km^{2} (0.94 sq mi)

Population (2011)
  - Total: 8,980
  - Density: 3,680/km^{2} (9,530/sq mi)

Languages*
  - Official: Bengali, Hindi, English
- Time zone: UTC+5:30 (IST)
- PIN: 713376
- Telephone/STD code: 0341
- Vehicle registration: WB
- Lok Sabha constituency: Asansol
- Vidhan Sabha constituency: Raniganj
- Website: paschimbardhaman.co.in

Harishpur is a census town in the Andal CD block in the Durgapur subdivision of the Paschim Bardhaman district in the Indian state of West Bengal.

== Geography ==
Cities and towns in the southern and eastern portions of Durgapur subdivision in Paschim Bardhaman district
MC: Municipal Corporation, CT: census town, R: rural centre, A: airport, B: barrage, H: historical site
Owing to space constraints in the small map, the actual locations in a larger map may vary slightly

=== Urbanisation ===
According to the 2011 census, 79.22% of the population of the Durgapur subdivision was urban and 20.78% was rural. The sole municipal corporation in the Durgapur subdivision is located at Durgapur and the subdivision has 38 (+1 partly) census towns (partly presented in the map alongside; all places marked on the map are linked in the full-screen map).

Siduli, Khandra, Ukhra, Mahira, Dakshin Khanda, Harishpur, Kajora, a part of Andal (gram), (all in Andal CD block), Parashkol (partly in Pandabeswar CD block and partly in Andal CD block) and Chak Bankola (partly in Pandabeswar CD block and partly in Andal CD block), lying north of National Highway 19 (old numbering NH 2)/ Grand Trunk Road form a cluster of census towns. This cluster is linked with two more clusters of census towns – one located south of NH 19 in Andal CD block and another lying in Pandabeswar CD block.

== Demographics ==
According to the 2011 Census of India, Harishpur had a total population of 8,980, of which 4,744 (53%) were males and 4,236 (47%) were females. Population in the age range was 1,137. The total number of literate persons in Harishpur was 5,613 (71.57% of the population over 6 years).

*For language details see Andal (community development block)#Language and religion

As of 2001 India census, Harishpur had a population of 8,401. Males constitute 55% of the population and females 45%. Harishpur has an average literacy rate of 57%, lower than the national average of 59.5%: male literacy is 66%, and female literacy is 47%. In Harishpur, 13% of the population is under 6 years of age.

== Infrastructure ==
According to the District Census Handbook 2011, Bardhaman, Harishpur covered an area of 2.44 km^{2}. Among the civic amenities, it had 10 km roads with open drains, the protected water-supply involved overhead tank, uncovered well and handpump. It had 1,470 domestic electric connections and 50 road lighting (points). The nearest government medical facilities are 4 km away. Among the educational facilities it had was 1 primary school, the nearest secondary school at Kajora 1 km away. Among the important commodities it produced were coal and bricks.

== Education ==
Harishpur has one primary school.
