= Khandra =

- Census Town
- Location in West Bengal, India Khandra (India)
- Coordinates: 23.641852°N 87.225499°E
- Country: India
- State: West Bengal
- District: Paschim Bardhaman

Area
  - Total: 7.49 km^{2} (2.89 sq mi)

Population (2011)
  - Total: 15,383
  - Density: 2,050/km^{2} (5,320/sq mi)

Languages*
  - Official: Bengali, Hindi, English
- Time zone: UTC+5:30 (IST)
- PIN: 713363
- Telephone/STD code: 0341
- Vehicle registration: WB
- Lok Sabha constituency: Asansol
- Vidhan Sabha constituency: Raniganj
- Website: paschimbardhaman.co.in

Khandra is a census town in the Andal CD block in the Durgapur subdivision of the Paschim Bardhaman district in the Indian state of West Bengal.

== Geography ==
Cities and towns in the southern and eastern portions of Durgapur subdivision in Paschim Bardhaman district
MC: Municipal Corporation, CT: census town, R: rural centre, A: airport, B: barrage, H: historical site
Owing to space constraints in the small map, the actual locations in a larger map may vary slightly

=== Location ===
Khandra is located at 23°38′31″N 87°13′32″E.

=== Urbanisation ===
According to the 2011 census, 79.22% of the population of the Durgapur subdivision was urban and 20.78% was rural. The sole municipal corporation in Durgapur subdivision is located at Durgapur and the subdivision has 38 (+1 partly) census towns (partly presented in the map alongside; all places marked on the map are linked in the full-screen map).

Siduli, Khandra, Ukhra, Mahira, Dakshin Khanda, Harishpur, Kajora, a part of Andal (gram), (all in Andal CD block), Parashkol (partly in Pandabeswar CD block and partly in Andal CD block) and Chak Bankola (partly in Pandabeswar CD block and partly in Andal CD block), lying north of NH 19 (old numbering NH 2)/ Grand Trunk Road form a cluster of census towns. This cluster is linked with two more clusters of census towns – one located south of NH 19 in Andal CD block and another lying in Pandabeswar CD block.

== Demographics ==
According to the 2011 Census of India, Khandra had a total population of 15,383 of which 8,096 (53%) were males and 7,287 (47%) were females. Population in the age range 0–6 years was 1,853. The total number of literate persons in Khandra was 9,773 (72.23% of the population over 6 years).

*For language details see Andal (community development block)#Language and religion

As of 2001 India census, Khandra had a population of 13,490. Males constitute 54% of the population and females 46%. Khandra has an average literacy rate of 57%, lower than the national average of 59.5%: male literacy is 66%, and female literacy is 46%. In Khandra, 13% of the population is under 6 years of age.

== Infrastructure ==
According to the District Census Handbook 2011, Bardhaman, Khandra covered an area of 7.49 km^{2}. Among the civic amenities, it had 13 km roads with open drains, the protected water-supply involved overhead tank, uncovered wells, tap water from treated sources. It had 385 domestic electric connections and 52 road lighting (points). Among the educational facilities it had were 6 primary schools, 2 middle schools, 2 secondary schools, 2 senior secondary schools, 1 general degree college. It had 1 recognised shorthand, typewriting and vocational training centre, 1 non-formal education centre (Sarba Siksha Abhiyan). Among the social, recreational and cultural facilities, it had 1 auditorium/ community hall. It had the branch office of 1 nationalised bank.

== Economy ==
It is in the heart of the coal mining zone.

According to the ECL website telephone numbers, operational collieries in the Bankola Area of Eastern Coalfields, in 2018 are: Bankola Colliery, Khandra Colliery, Kumardih A Colliery, Kumardih B Colliery, Moira Colliery, Nakrakonda Colliery, Shankarpur Colliery, Shyamsundarpur Colliery and Tilaboni Colliery.

== Education ==
Khandra College was established at Khandra in 1981. It is affiliated with Kazi Nazrul University.

Khandra High School is a Bengali-medium coeducational institution established in 1975. It has facilities for teaching from class V to class XII. The school has 1 computer and a library with 500 books.

Oxford Mission Khandra is an English-medium coeducational institution established in 1995. It has facilities for teaching from class I to class XII. The school has 6 computers, a library with 750 books and a playground.

St. Mathews Central Church School is an English-medium coeducational institution established in 1985. It has facilities for teaching from class I to class VIII.

Mukundapur Hindi Junior High School is a Hindi-medium institution established in 2009. It has facilities for teaching from class V to class VIII. There is a Hindi-medium high school at Ukhra.

== Healthcare ==
Khandra Rural Hospital, with 30 beds, is the major government medical facility in the Andal CD block. There are primary health centres at Andal (with 6 beds) and Baska (with 10 beds). ECL Bankola Area Hospital at Khandra, with 50 beds is functional.

Medical facilities (periodic medical examination centres and dispensaries) in the Bankola Area of ECL are available at Bankola Area PME Centre (with 30 beds + 2 cabins) (PO Ukhra), Khandra (PO Khandra), Bankola Colliery (PO Khandra), Bankola Area (PO Khandra), Shyamsundarpur (PO Khandra), Mahira (PO Moira), Tilaboni (PO Pandabeswar), Nakrakonda (PO Pandabeswar), Shankarpur (PO Sheetalpur), Kumardihi A (PO Pandabeswar), Kumardihi B (PO Pandabeswar).
