= Siduli =

- Census Town
- Location in West Bengal, India Siduli (India)
- Coordinates: 23°39′18″N 87°12′28.8″E
- Country: India
- State: West Bengal
- District: Paschim Bardhaman

Area
  - Total: 1.85 km^{2} (0.71 sq mi)

Population (2011)
  - Total: 8,961
  - Density: 4,840/km^{2} (12,500/sq mi)

Languages*
  - Official: Bengali, Hindi, English
- Time zone: UTC+5:30 (IST)
- PIN: 713322
- Telephone/STD code: 0341
- Vehicle registration: WB
- Lok Sabha constituency: Asansol
- Vidhan Sabha constituency: Raniganj
- Website: paschimbardhaman.co.in

Siduli is a census town in the Andal CD block in the Durgapur subdivision of the Paschim Bardhaman district in the Indian state of West Bengal.

== Geography ==
Cities and towns in the southern and eastern portions of Durgapur subdivision in Paschim Bardhaman district
MC: Municipal Corporation, CT: census town, R: rural centre, A: airport, B: barrage, H: historical site
Owing to space constraints in the small map, the actual locations in a larger map may vary slightly

=== Urbanisation ===
According to the 2011 census, 79.22% of the population of the Durgapur subdivision was urban and 20.78% was rural. The sole municipal corporation in Durgapur subdivision is located at Durgapur and the subdivision has 38 (+1 partly) census towns (partly presented in the map alongside; all places marked on the map are linked in the full-screen map).

Siduli, Khandra, Ukhra, Mahira, Dakshin Khanda, Harishpur, Kajora, a part of Andal (gram), (all in Andal CD block), Parashkol (partly in Pandabeswar CD block and partly in Andal CD block) and Chak Bankola (partly in Pandabeswar CD block and partly in Andal CD block), lying north of National Highway 19 (old numbering NH 2)/ Grand Trunk Road form a cluster of census towns. This cluster is linked with two more clusters of census towns – one located south of NH 19 in Andal CD block and another lying in Pandabeswar CD block.

== Demographics ==
According to the 2011 Census of India, Siduli had a total population of 8,961 of which 4,693 (52%) were males and 4,268 (48%) were females. Population in the age range 0–6 years was 1,154. The total number of literates in Siduli was 5,536 (70.91% of the population over 6 years).

*For language details see Andal (community development block)#Language and religion

As of 2001 India census, Siduli had a population of 8341. Males constitute 54% of the population and females 46%. Siduli has an average literacy rate of 55%, lower than the national average of 59.5%: male literacy is 65%, and female literacy is 43%. In Siduli, 14% of the population is under 6 years of age.

== Infrastructure ==
According to the District Census Handbook 2011, Bardhaman, Siduli covered an area of 1.85 km^{2}. Among the civic amenities, it had 11.5 km roads with open drains, the protected water-supply involved uncovered wells, tap water from treated sources. It had 768 domestic electric connections. Among the medical facilities it had were 1 dispensary/ health centre, 2 family welfare centres, 2 medicine shops. Among the educational facilities it had were 5 primary schools, 1 middle school, the nearest secondary school, the nearest senior secondary school, general degree college at Khandra 2/2.5 km away. Among the social, recreational and cultural facilities, it had 1 stadium, 1 auditorium/ community hall.

== Economy ==
As of 2015-16, Siduli opencast project in Kenda Area of Eastern Coalfields has a mineable reserve of 9.70 million tonnes. While Siduli opencast has capacity of 1 million tonnes per year, Siduli underground has a capacity of 1.02 million tonnes per year.

According to the ECL website telephone numbers, operational collieries in the Kenda Area of Eastern Coalfields in 2018 are: Bahula Colliery, Chora Block Incline, CI Jambad Colliery, Chora OCP, Haripur Colliery, Lower Kenda Colliery, New Kenda Colliery, Siduli Colliery, SK OCP, West Kenda OCP.

== Transport ==
Siduli railway station is located 10 km from Andal on the Andal-Sainthia Branch Line of Eastern Railway.

== Education ==
Siduli has two primary schools.

== Healthcare ==
Medical facilities (hospital/ dispensary) in the Kenda Area of ECL are available at Chhora Regional Hospital (with 30 beds) (PO Bahula), New Kenda (PO New Kenda), Lower Kenda (PO Haripur), Bahula (PO Bahula), CI Jambad (PO Bahula), Siduli (PO Siduli), Haripur (PO Haripur), CBI (PO Haripur), Chora Group pits (PO Haripur).
