= Ghaghar Burhi =

Hindu temple in Asansol, West Bengal, India

Ghaghar Buri Temple
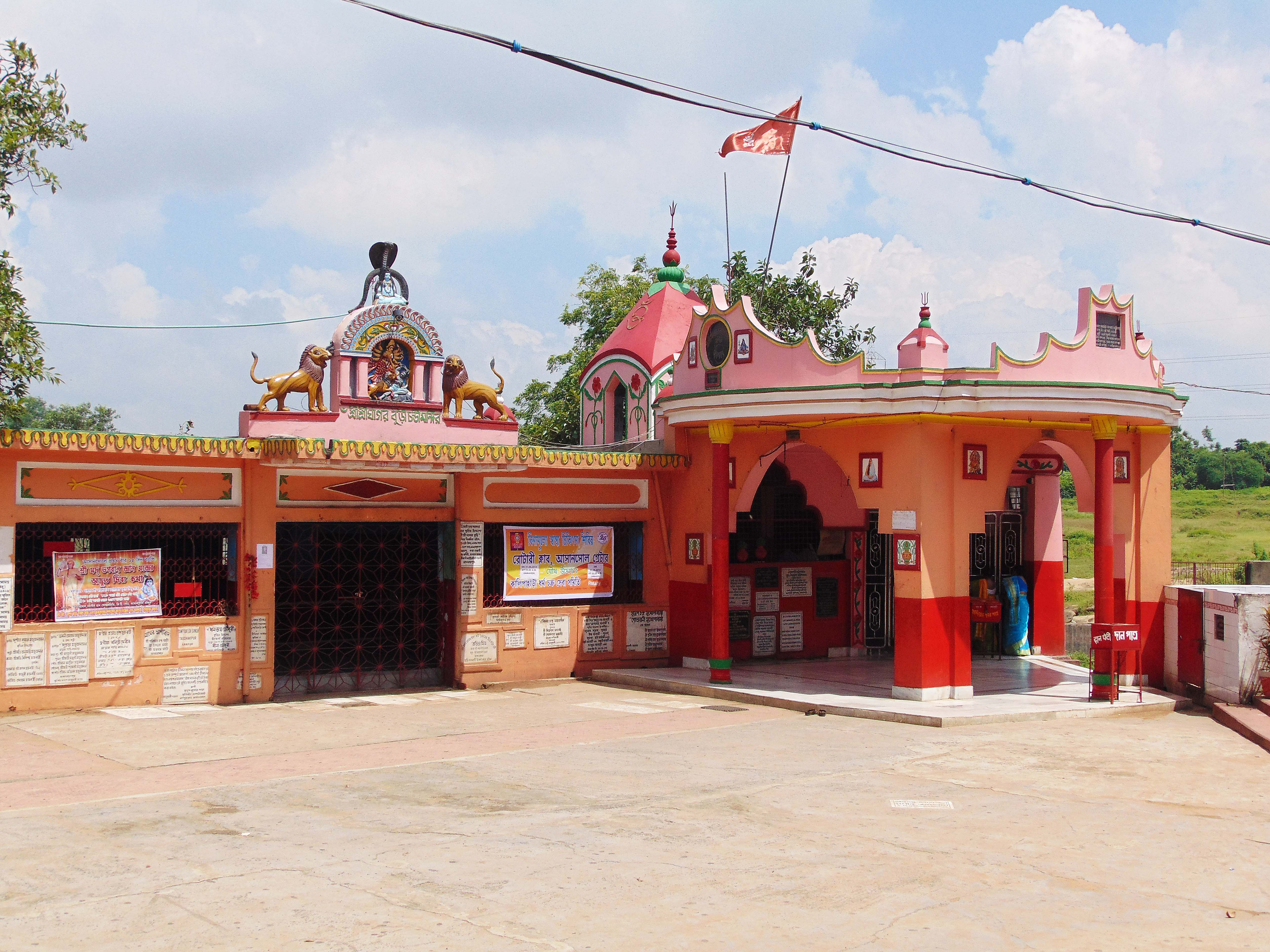

- Location in West Bengal Ghaghar Burhi (India)

Religion
- Affiliation: Hinduism
- District: Paschim Bardhaman
- Deity: Ghaghar Buri Chandi Mata

Location
- Location: National Highway (Bypass), Asansol
- State: West Bengal
- Country: India
- Interactive map of Ghaghar Buri Temple
- Coordinates: 23°41′00″N 87°00′24″E

Ghaghar Buri (Bengali: ঘাঘর বুড়ি), is a small shrine dedicated to Goddess Kali Mata. It is located in Asansol city, by the side of the National Highway (Bypass) in West Bengal, India. It is the oldest temple of Asansol. A country fair is held in this Temple on 15 January every year. Animals are sacrificed as part of worship.

== Overview ==
Legend has it that a marriage procession was unable to cross the rivulet in spate. They worshipped the deity, and the water subsided. They crossed the rivulet safely. But the king promised to give head of two goats for this but as he passed they forgot their promise Goddess curse them and all were inside the water still it can be seen according to the old people saying (The rivulet now acts as sewage drainage of Asansol City. There are boulders and uneven stones, which gives rise to a strong current and eddy. This otherwise narrow and small rivulet is dangerous to cross).
