= Dakshin Khanda =

- Census Town
- Location in West Bengal, India Dakshin Khanda (India)
- Coordinates: 23°37′11.6″N 87°13′01.6″E
- Country: India
- State: West Bengal
- District: Paschim Bardhaman

Area
  - Total: 7.8123 km^{2} (3.0163 sq mi)

Population (2011)
  - Total: 8,449
  - Density: 1,081/km^{2} (2,801/sq mi)

Languages*
  - Official: Bengali, Hindi, English
- Time zone: UTC+5:30 (IST)
- PIN: 713123
- Telephone/STD code: 0341
- Vehicle registration: WB
- Lok Sabha constituency: Asansol
- Vidhan Sabha constituency: Raniganj
- Website: paschimbardhaman.co.in

Dakshin Khanda is a census town in the Andal CD block in the Durgapur subdivision of the Paschim Bardhaman district in the Indian state of West Bengal.

== Geography ==
Cities and towns in the southern and eastern portions of Durgapur subdivision in Paschim Bardhaman district
MC: Municipal Corporation, CT: census town, R: rural centre, A: airport, B: barrage, H: historical site
Owing to space constraints in the small map, the actual locations in a larger map may vary slightly

=== Urbanisation ===
According to the 2011 census, 79.22% of the population of the Durgapur subdivision was urban and 20.78% was rural. The sole municipal corporation in Durgapur subdivision is located at Durgapur and the subdivision has 38 (+1 partly) census towns (partly presented in the map alongside; all places marked on the map are linked in the full-screen map).

Siduli, Khandra, Ukhra, Mahira, Dakshin Khanda, Harishpur, Kajora, a part of Andal (gram), (all in Andal CD block), Parashkol (partly in Pandabeswar CD block and partly in Andal CD block) and Chak Bankola (partly in Pandabeswar CD block and partly in Andal CD block), lying north of National Highway 19 (old numbering NH 2)/ Grand Trunk Road form a cluster of census towns. This cluster is linked with two more clusters of census towns – one located south of NH 19 in Andal CD block and another lying in Pandabeswar CD block.

== Demographics ==
According to the 2011 Census of India, Dakshin Khanda had a total population of 8,449 of which 4,344 (51%) were males and 4,105 (49%) were females. Population in the age range 0–6 years was 899. The total number of literate persons in Dakshin Khanda was 5,907 (78.24% of the population over 6 years).

*For language details see Andal (community development block)#Language and religion

== Infrastructure ==
According to the District Census Handbook 2011, Bardhaman, Dakshin Khanda covered an area of 7.8123 km^{2}. Among the civic amenities, the protected water-supply involved overhead tank, tap water from treated sources. It had 1210 domestic electric connections and 5 road lighting (points). Among the medical facilities it had 1 dispensary/ health centre. Among the educational facilities it had were 2 primary schools, the nearest secondary school at Mahira 1 km away, the nearest senior secondary school at Khandra 5 km away. Among the social, recreational and cultural facilities it had 1 public library.
