= Mahira =

Mahira Moira
- Census Town
- Location in West Bengal, India Mahira (India)
- Coordinates: 23.628956°N 87.212109°E
- Country: India
- State: West Bengal
- District: Paschim Bardhaman

Area
  - Total: 1.34 km^{2} (0.52 sq mi)

Population (2011)
  - Total: 4,188
  - Density: 3,130/km^{2} (8,090/sq mi)

Languages*
  - Official: Bengali, Hindi, English
- Time zone: UTC+5:30 (IST)
- PIN: 713321 (Moira)
- Telephone/STD code: 0341
- Vehicle registration: WB
- Lok Sabha constituency: Asansol
- Vidhan Sabha constituency: Raniganj
- Website: paschimbardhaman.co.in

Mahira (also called Moira) is a census town in the Andal CD block in the Durgapur subdivision of the Paschim Bardhaman district in the Indian state of West Bengal.

== Geography ==
Cities and towns in the southern and eastern portions of Durgapur subdivision in Paschim Bardhaman district
MC: Municipal Corporation, CT: census town, R: rural centre, A: airport, B: barrage, H: historical sites
Owing to space constraints in the small map, the actual locations in a larger map may vary slightly

=== Location ===
Mahira is located at 23°37′44″N 87°12′44″E.

=== Urbanisation ===
According to the 2011 census, 79.22% of the population of the Durgapur subdivision was urban and 20.78% was rural. The sole municipal corporation in Durgapur subdivision is located at Durgapur and the subdivision has 38 (+1 partly) census towns (partly presented in the map alongside; all places marked on the map are linked in the full-screen map).

Siduli, Khandra, Ukhra, Mahira, Dakshin Khanda, Harishpur, Kajora, a part of Andal (gram), (all in Andal CD block), Parashkol (partly in Pandabeswar CD block and partly in Andal CD block) and Chak Bankola (partly in Pandabeswar CD block and partly in Andal CD block), lying north of National Highway 19 (old numbering NH 2)/ Grand Trunk Road form a cluster of census towns. This cluster is linked with two more clusters of census towns – one located south of NH 19 in Andal CD block and another lying in Pandabeswar CD block.

== Demographics ==
According to the 2011 Census of India, Mahira had a total population of 4,188 of which 2,238 (53%) were males and 1,950 (47%) were females. Population in the age range 0–6 years was 462. The total number of literate persons in Mahira was 2,564 (68.81% of the population over 6 years).

*For language details see Andal (community development block)#Language and religion

As of 2001 India census, Mahira had a population of 4,492. Males constitute 56% of the population and females 44%. Mahira has an average literacy rate of 61%, higher than the national average of 59.5%: male literacy is 70%, and female literacy is 49%. In Mahira, 12% of the population is under 6 years of age.

== Infrastructure ==
According to the District Census Handbook 2011, Bardhaman, Mahira covered an area of 1.34 km^{2}. Among the civic amenities, the protected water-supply involved overhead tank, tap water from treated sources. It had 369 domestic electric connections. Among the medical facilities it had 1 dispensary/ health centre, 1 family welfare centre, 12 maternity and child welfare clinics (?), 2 medicine shops. Among the educational facilities it had were 1 primary school, 1 middle school, 1 secondary school, the nearest senior secondary school, the nearest general degree college at Khandra 4 km away. Among the social, recreational and cultural facilities it had 1 stadium.

== Economy ==
Collieries in the Bankola Area of Eastern Coalfields are: Moira, Khandra, Bankola, Shyamsundarpur, Kumardihi A, Kumardihi B, Tilaboni, Shankerpur and Shankerpur OCP.

== Education ==
Mahira has one primary school.

== Healthcare ==
Medical facilities (periodic medical examination centres and dispensaries) in the Bankola Area of ECL are available at Bankola Area PME Centre (with 30 beds + 2 cabins) (PO Ukhra), Khandra (PO Khandra), Bankola Colliery (PO Khandra), Bankola Area (PO Khandra), Shyamsundarpur (PO Khandra), Mahira (PO Moira), Tilaboni (PO Pandabeswar), Nakrakonda (PO Pandabeswar), Shankarpur (PO Sheetalpur), Kumardihi A (PO Pandabeswar), Kumardihi B (PO Pandabeswar).
