= Ukhra =

- Neighborhood in Durgapur, West Bengal
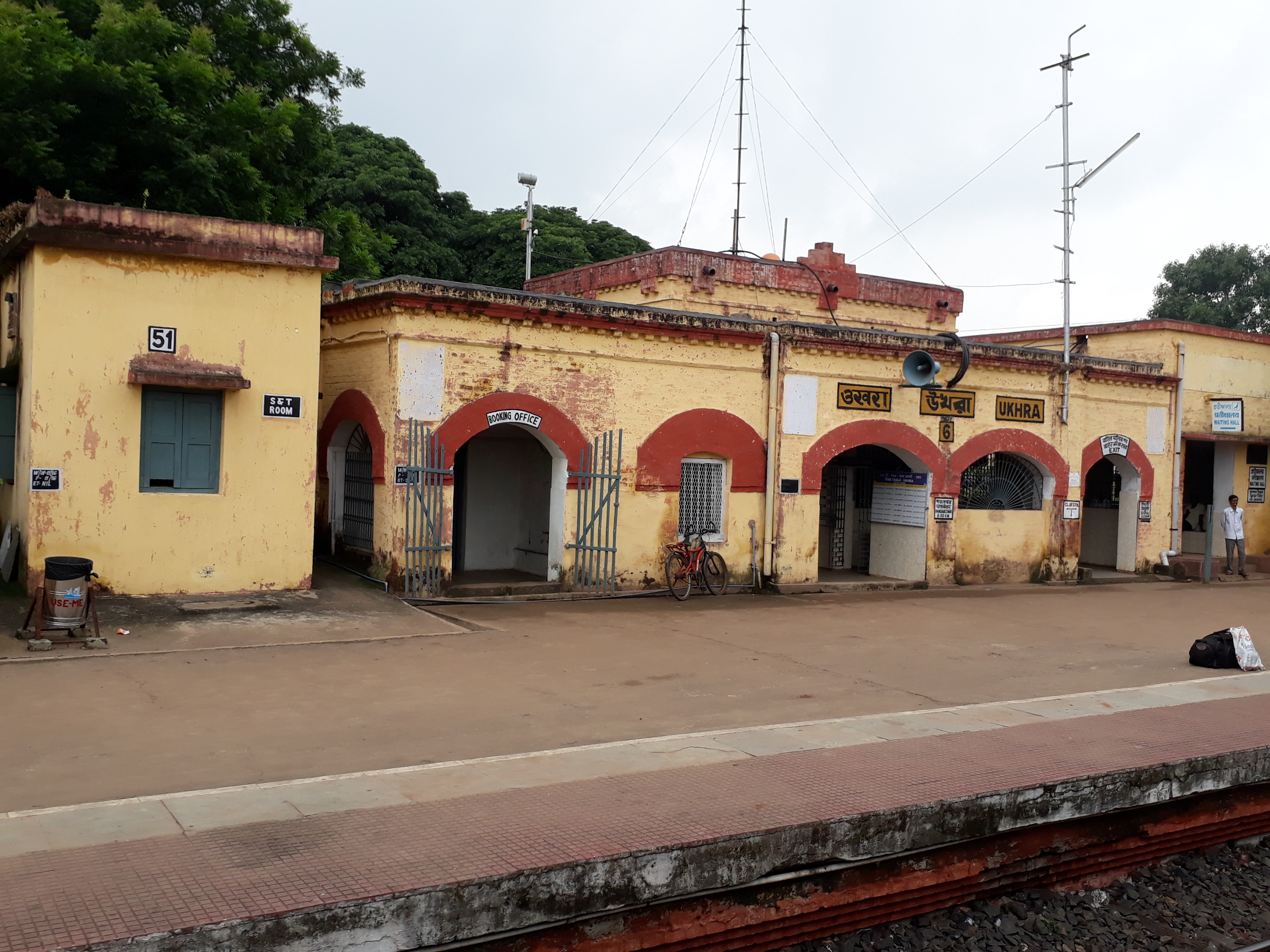
- Ukhra railway station

- Location in West Bengal, India Ukhra (India)
- Coordinates: 23.654°N 87.243°E
- Country: India
- State: West Bengal
- District: Paschim Bardhaman

Area
  - Total: 7.33 km^{2} (2.83 sq mi)

Population (2011)
  - Total: 24,104
  - Density: 3,290/km^{2} (8,520/sq mi)

Languages*
  - Official: Bengali, Hindi, English
- Time zone: UTC+5:30 (IST)
- PIN: 713363
- Telephone/STD code: 0341
- Vehicle registration: WB
- Lok Sabha constituency: Bardhaman - Durgapur
- Vidhan Sabha constituency: Durgapur Paschim
- Website: paschimbardhaman.co.in

Ukhra is a neighborhood in the Kanksa CD block in the Durgapur city of the Paschim Bardhaman district in the Indian state of West Bengal.

== Geography ==
Cities and towns in the southern and eastern portions of Durgapur subdivision in Paschim Bardhaman district
MC: Municipal Corporation, CT: census town, R: rural centre, A: airport, B: barrage, H: historical site
Owing to space constraints in the small map, the actual locations in a larger map may vary slightly

=== Location ===
Ukhra is located at 23.654°N 87.243°E.

Ukhra is a census town in Andal (community development block), as per Serial No. 237 of Towns/ Villages in the Bardhaman district section of 2011 census data and also the Map of CD block Ondal on Page 229 of District Census Handbook for Bardhaman District.

=== Urbanisation ===
According to the 2011 census, 79.22% of the population of the Durgapur subdivision was urban and 20.78% was rural. The sole municipal corporation in Durgapur subdivision is located at Durgapur and the subdivision has 38 (+1 partly) census towns (partly presented in the map above; all places marked on the map are linked in the full-screen map).

Siduli, Khandra, Ukhra, Mahira, Dakshin Khanda, Harishpur, Kajora, a part of Andal (gram), (all in Andal CD block), Parashkol (partly in Pandabeswar CD block and partly in Andal CD block) and Chak Bankola (partly in Pandabeswar CD block and partly in Andal CD block), lying north of National Highway 19 (old numbering NH 2)/ Grand Trunk Road form a cluster of census towns. This cluster is linked with two more clusters of census towns – one located south of NH 19 in Andal CD block and another lying in Pandabeswar CD block.

== Demographics ==
According to the 2011 Census of India, Ukhra had a total population of 24,104 of which 12,500 (52%) were males and 11,604 (48%) were females. Population below 6 years was 2,489. The total number of literates in Ukhra was 17,591 (81.38% of the population over 6 years).

*For language details see Andal (community development block)#Language and religion

As of 2001 India census, Ukhra had a population of 19,868. Males constitute 53% of the population and females 47%. Ukhra has an average literacy rate of 69%, higher than the national average of 59.5%: male literacy is 76%, and female literacy is 61%. In Ukhra, 11% of the population is under 6 years of age.

== Infrastructure ==
According to the District Census Handbook 2011, Bardhaman, Ukhra covered an area of 7.33 km^{2}. Among the civic amenities, it had 10 km roads with open drains, the protected water-supply involved overhead tank, tap water from treated sources. It had 710 domestic electric connections and 40 road lighting (points). Among the medical facilities it had 1 dispensary/ health centre, 1 family welfare centre, 3 maternity and child welfare clinics. Among the educational facilities it had were 8 primary schools, 1 secondary school, 1 senior secondary school. It had 3 non-formal education centres (Sarva Shiksha Abhiyan). Among the social, recreational and cultural facilities it had 1 auditorium/ community hall, 1 public library. Among the important commodities it manufactured was soap and bakery products. It had the branch office of 2 nationalised banks, 1 private commercial bank, 1 cooperative bank and 1 non-agricultural credit society.

== Transport ==
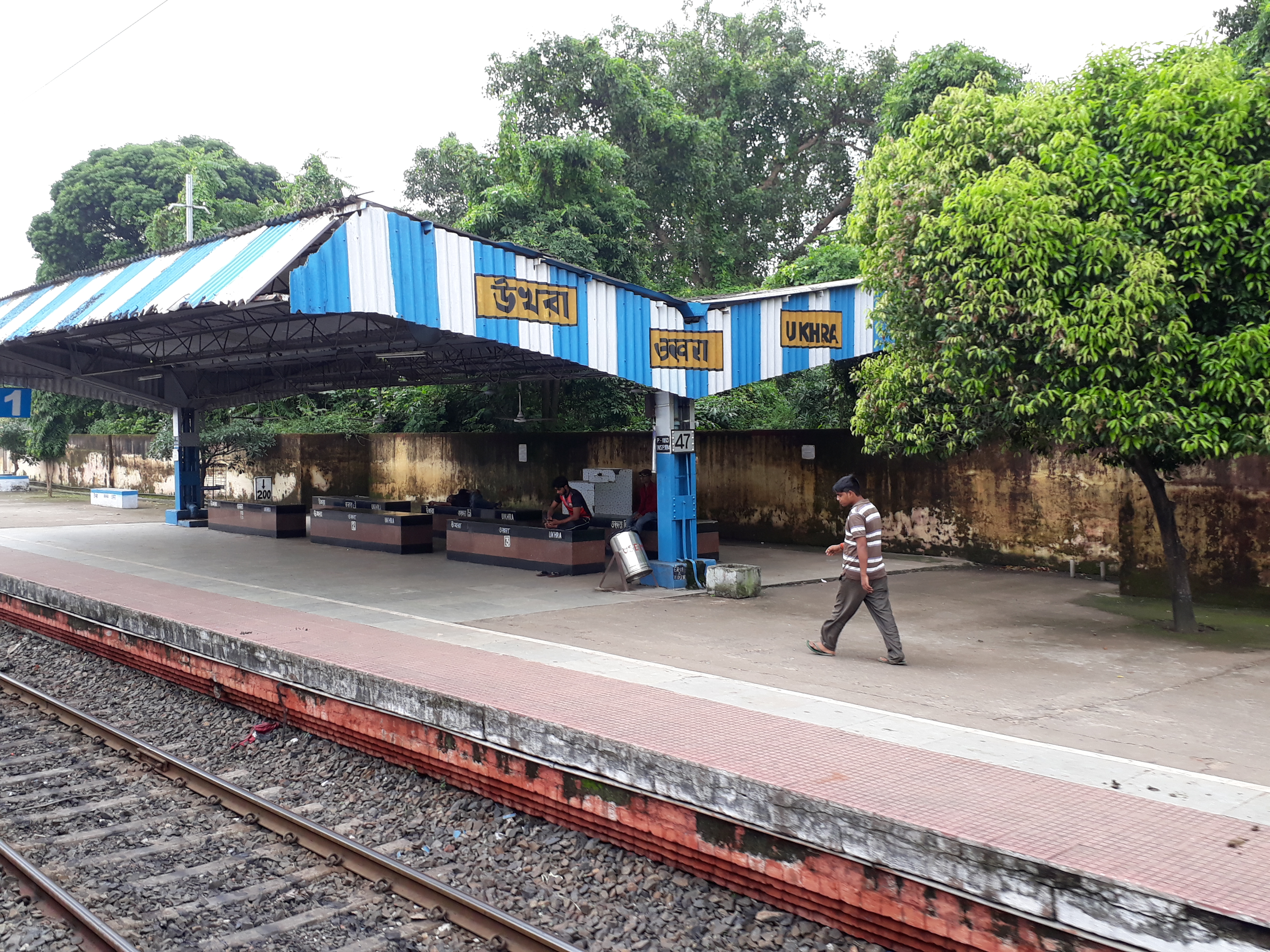
Ukhra Railway Station

Ukhra railway station is 12 km from Andal on the Andal-Sainthia Branch Line of Eastern Railway.

== Education ==
Ukhra Kunja Behari Institution is a Bengali-medium boys only institution established in 1859. It has facilities for teaching from class V to class XII. The school has 1 computer, a library with 3,000 books and a playground.

Ukhra Kunja Behari High School is a Bengali-medium coeducation institution established in 1975. It has facilities for teaching from class V to class X. The school has 10 computers and a library with 500 books.

Ukhra Adarsha Hindi High School is a Hindi-medium coeducational institution established in 1965. It has facilities for teaching from class V to class XII. The school has 15 computers and a library with 3,263 books.

Gulzarbagh Urdu Junior High School is an Urdu-medium coeducational institution established in 2009. It has facilities for teaching from class VI to class VIII.

Assembly of God Church School was established at Ukhra in 1980. It has facilities for teaching from Nursery to class XII. It follows the Council for the Indian School Certificate Examinations syllabus.

== Healthcare ==
The 50-bed Bankola Area Hospital of Eastern Coalfields is located at Ukhra.

Medical facilities (periodic medical examination centres and dispensaries) in the Bankola Area of ECL are available at Bankola Area PME Centre (with 30 beds + 2 cabins) (PO Ukhra), Khandra (PO Khandra), Bankola Colliery (PO Khandra), Bankola Area (PO Khandra), Shyamsundarpur (PO Khandra), Mahira (PO Moira), Tilaboni (PO Pandabeswar), Nakrakonda (PO Pandabeswar), Shankarpur (PO Sheetalpur), Kumardihi A (PO Pandabeswar), Kumardihi B (PO Pandabeswar).
