= Andal (community development block) =

Andal Ondal
- Community development block
- Location in West Bengal
- Coordinates: 23°35′00″N 87°11′00″E
- Country: India
- State: West Bengal
- District: Paschim Bardhaman
- Parliamentary constituency: Asansol
- Assembly constituency: Raniganj

Area
  - Total: 32.77 sq mi (84.87 km^{2})
- Elevation: 292 ft (89 m)

Population (2011)
  - Total: 186,915
  - Density: 5,704/sq mi (2,202/km^{2})
- Time zone: UTC+5.30 (IST)
- PIN: 713321 (Andal South Bazar); 713338 (Kajoragram); 713363 (Ukhra)
- Telephone/STD code: 0343
- Vehicle registration: WB-39,WB-40
- Literacy Rate: 77.25 per cent
- Website: http://bardhaman.gov.in/

Andal (also spelled Ondal) is a community development block that forms an administrative division in Durgapur subdivision of Paschim Bardhaman district in the Indian state of West Bengal.

== Geography ==
Andal is located at 23°35′N 87°11′E.

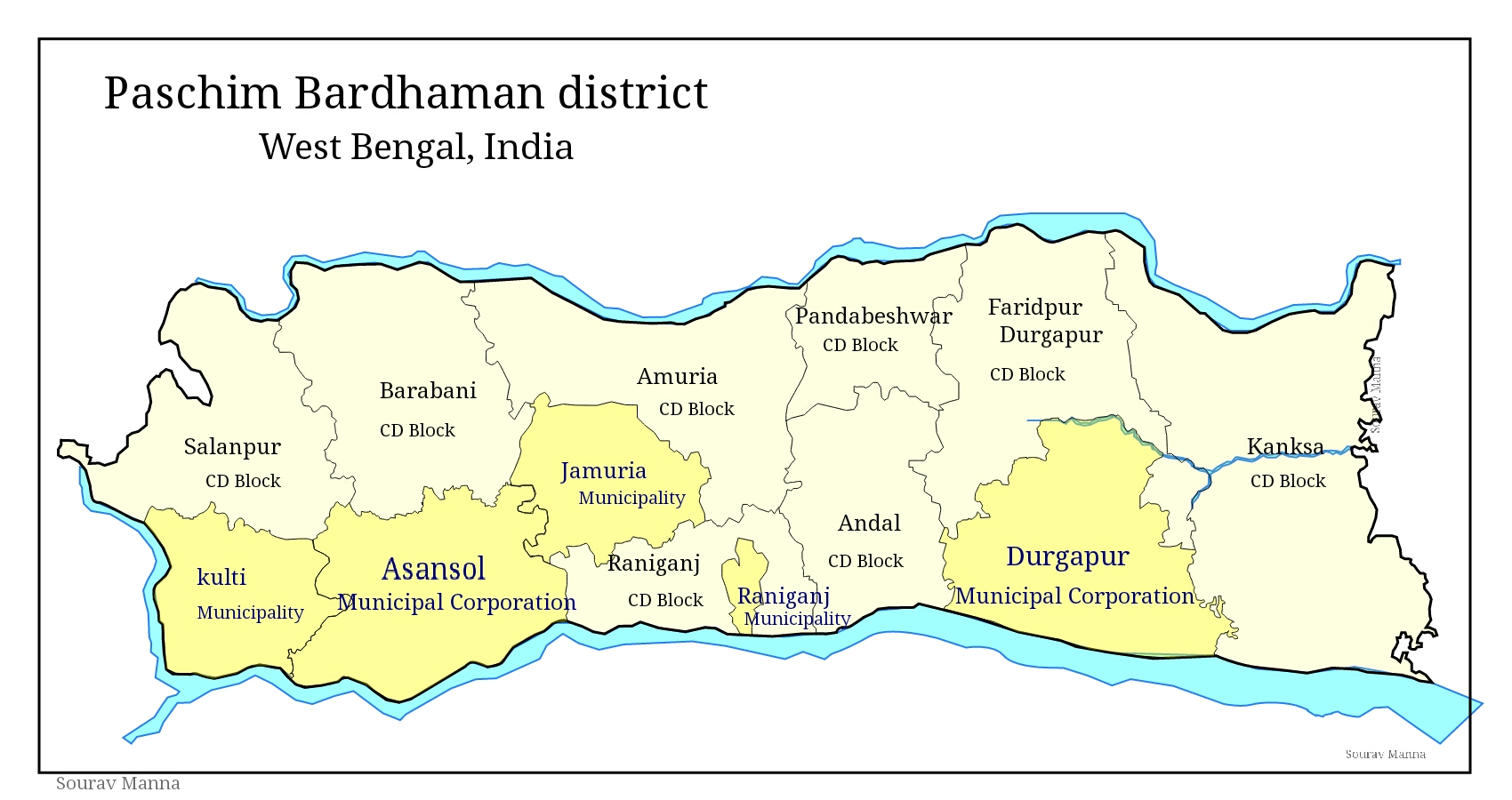
Map of Paschim Bardhaman district

Andal CD Block is part of the Ajay Damodar Barakar tract. This area is sort of an extension of the Chota Nagpur Plateau. It is a rocky undulating area with laterite soil, with the Ajay on the north, the Damodar on the south and the Barakar on the west. For ages the area was heavily forested and infested with plunderers and marauders. The discovery of coal, in the eighteenth century, led to industrialisation of the area and most of the forests have been cleared.

Andal CD Block is bounded by Pandabeswar CD Block on the north, Faridpur Durgapur CD Block on the east, Barjora CD Block, in Bankura district, on the south and Raniganj CD Block on the west.

Andal CD Block has an area of 84.87 km^{2}. It has 1 panchayat samity, 8 gram panchayats, 146 gram sansads (village councils), 14 mouzas and 12 inhabited villages. Andal, Pandabeswar and Durgapur police stations serve this block. Headquarters of this CD Block is at Andal.

Singaran, a small stream about 35 km long has its origin near Ikra in the Jamuria area, flows past Topsi and Andal and joins the Damodar near Waria.

Gram panchayats of the Andal block, or panchayat samiti, are: Andal, Dakshin Khanda, Kajora, Khandra, Madanpur, Ramprosadpur, Srirampur and Ukhra.

== Demographics ==
=== Population ===
As per the 2011 Census of India Ondal CD Block had a total population of 186,915, of which 35,611 were rural and 151,304 were urban. There were 98,149 (53%) males and 88,766 (47%) females. Population below 6 years was 20,893. Scheduled Castes numbered 52,518 (28.10%) and Scheduled Tribes numbered 7,628 (4.08%).

As per 2001 census, Andal block had a total population of 168,807, out of which 91,633 were males and 77,174 were females. Andal block registered a population growth of 9.47 per cent during the 1991-2001 decade. Decadal growth for Bardhaman district was 14.36 per cent. Decadal growth in West Bengal was 17.84 per cent. Scheduled castes at 54,611 formed around one-fourth the population. Scheduled tribes numbered 9,883.

Census Towns in Ondal CD Block are (2011 census figures in brackets): Siduli (8,961), Khandra (15,383), Chak Bankola (part) (1,965), Ukhra (24,104), Mahira (4,188), Dakshin Khanda (8,449), Parashkol (part) (845), Kajora (27,275), Harishpur (8,980), Palashban (4,811), Dignala (13,633), Andal (gram) (6,177), Ondal (19,924) and Baska (6,609). Chak Bankola and Parashkol are partly in Andal CD Block and partly in Pandabeswar CD Block.

Large villages (with 4,000+ population) in Ondal CD Block are (2011 census figures in brackets): Bhadur (4,278), Madanpur (4,631) and Shrirampur (4,235).

Other villages in Ondal CD Block are (2011census figures in brackets): Mukundapur (2,913), Madhusudanpur (3,435), Gaidhoba (2,471), Dhandadihi (3,800), Madhabpur (2,216), Chak Rambati (1,557), Babuisol (1,941), Tamla (732) and Dhubchururia (3,402).(All villages included in 2011 census data are mentioned here. Other villages or localities, if any, are parts of these villages.)

=== Literacy ===
As per the 2011 census, the total number of literates in Ondal CD Block was 128,254 (77.25% of the population over 6 years) out of which males numbered 74,218 (85.02% of the male population over 6 years) and females numbered 54,036 (68.64% of the female population over 6 years). The gender disparity (the difference between female and male literacy rates) was 16.38%.

As per 2001 census, Andal block had a total literacy of 72.01 per cent for the 6+ age group. While male literacy was 80.86 per cent female literacy was 61.36 per cent. Bardhaman district had a total literacy of 70.18 per cent, male literacy being 78.63 per cent and female literacy being 60.95 per cent.

See also – List of West Bengal districts ranked by literacy rate

Literacy in CD blocks of
Bardhaman district
Bardhaman Sadar North subdivision
Ausgram I – 69.39%
Ausgram II – 68.00%
Bhatar – 71.56%
Burdwan I – 76.07%
Burdwan II – 74.12%
Galsi II – 70.05%
Bardhaman Sadar South subdivision
Khandaghosh – 77.28%
Raina I – 80.20%
Raina II – 81.48%
Jamalpur – 74.08%
Memari I – 74.10%
Memari II – 74.59%
Kalna subdivision
Kalna I – 75.81%
Kalna II – 76.25%
Manteswar – 73.08%
Purbasthali I – 77.59%
Purbasthali II – 70.35%
Katwa subdivision
Katwa I – 70.36%
Katwa II – 69.16%
Ketugram I – 68.00%
Ketugram II – 65.96%
Mongalkote – 67.97%
Durgapur subdivision
Andal – 77.25%
Faridpur Durgapur – 74.14%
Galsi I – 72.81%
Kanksa – 76.34%
Pandabeswar – 73.01%
Asansol subdivision
Barabani – 69.58%
Jamuria – 69.42%
Raniganj – 73.86%
Salanpur – 78.76%
2011 Census: CD Block Wise

Primary Census Abstract Data

=== Language and religion ===
Religion in Ondal CD block (2011)
Hinduism	90.52%
Islam	8.69%
Other or not stated	0.79%

In the 2011 census Hindus numbered 169,195 and formed 90.52% of the population in Ondal CD Block. Muslims numbered 16,240 and formed 8.69% of the population. Christians numbered 472 and formed 0.25% of the population. Others numbered 1,008 and formed 0.54% of the population.

Languages of Ondal CD block (2011)
1. Bengali (56.2%)
2. Hindi (35.3%)
3. Urdu (3.91%)
4. Santali (1.80%)
5. Others (2.76%)

At the time of the 2011 census, 56.21% of the population spoke Bengali, 35.32% Hindi, 3.91% Urdu and 1.80% Santali as their first language.

== Rural poverty ==
As per poverty estimates obtained from household survey for families living below poverty line in 2005, rural poverty in Andal CD Block was 18.35%.

== Economy ==
=== Livelihood ===
Livelihood
in Andal CD Block
1. Cultivators (2.19%)
2. Agricultural labourers (3.43%)
3. Household industries (2.55%)
4. Other Workers (91.8%)

In Andal CD Block in 2011, amongst the class of total workers, cultivators numbered 1,296 and formed 2.19% of the total workers, agricultural labourers numbered 2,026 and formed 3.43%, household industry workers numbered 1,507 and formed 2.55% and other workers numbered 54,302 and formed 91.83%. Total workers numbered 59,131 and formed 31.64% of the total population, and non-workers numbered 127,784 and formed 68.36% of the population.

The coalmines are spread across the Andal, Pandaveswar, Raniganj, Jamuria, Barabani and Salanpur region, including municipal areas. Livelihood in this region is coal-centred. The area does not produce much of agricultural products. Overall work participation rate, and female work participation rate, in the mining area are low. Interestingly the work participation rate in the predominantly agricultural rural areas of erstwhile Bardhaman district is higher than in the predominantly urbanised mining area. Human development in the mining area does not at all look good. However, in the composite livelihood index the mining area performs much better than the non-mining areas of erstwhile Bardhaman district. The decadal (1991-2001) change in composition of workers shows the growing pressure of population growth, as well as of migrants from adjacent Jharkhand.

Note: In the census records a person is considered a cultivator, if the person is engaged in cultivation/ supervision of land owned by self/government/institution. When a person who works on another person's land for wages in cash or kind or share, is regarded as an agricultural labourer. Household industry is defined as an industry conducted by one or more members of the family within the household or village, and one that does not qualify for registration as a factory under the Factories Act. Other workers are persons engaged in some economic activity other than cultivators, agricultural labourers and household workers. It includes factory, mining, plantation, transport and office workers, those engaged in business and commerce, teachers, entertainment artistes and so on.

=== Infrastructure ===
All 14 or 100% of mouzas in Andal CD Block were electrified by 31 March 2014.

All 14 mouzas in Andal CD Block had drinking water facilities in 2013-14. There were 14 fertiliser depots, 8 seed stores and 55 fair price shops in the CD Block.

=== Coal mining ===
Purushattompur open cast project in Bankola Area of Eastern Coalfields has a mineable reserve of 8 million tonnes.

Siduli opencast project in Kenda Area of Eastern Coalfields has a mineable reserve of 9.70 million tonnes.

Banbahai open cast project in Kenda area of Eastern Coalfields has a mineable reserve of 5.26 million tonnes.

Amongst the mines of Eastern Coalfields selected for introduction of mass production technology with the installation of the continuous miner are: Siduli UG (1.02 million tonnes year), Shankarpur UG (1.163 mty), Naba Kajora Madabpur (1.08 mty) and Parasea-Belbaid UG (1.83 mty).

See also – Bankola Area, Kajora Area and Kenda Area of Eastern Coalfields

=== Agriculture ===
Although the Bargadari Act of 1950 recognised the rights of bargadars to a higher share of crops from the land that they tilled, it was not implemented fully. Large tracts, beyond the prescribed limit of land ceiling, remained with the rich landlords. From 1977 onwards major land reforms took place in West Bengal. Land in excess of land ceiling was acquired and distributed amongst the peasants. Following land reforms land ownership pattern has undergone transformation. In 2013-14, persons engaged in agriculture in Andal CD Block could be classified as follows: bargadars 17.10%, patta (document) holders 38.31%, small farmers (possessing land between 1 and 2 hectares) 1.47%, marginal farmers (possessing land up to 1 hectare) 11.83% and agricultural labourers 31.29%.

In 2003-04 net cropped area in Andal CD Block was 1,551 hectares and the area in which more than one crop was grown was 1,275 hectares.

In 2013-14, Andal CD Block produced 3,060 tonnes of Aman paddy, the main winter crop, from 1,196 hectares and 7 tonnes of wheat from 5 hectares. It also produced pulses and oilseeds.

=== Banking ===
In 2013-14, Andal CD Block had offices of 8 commercial banks.

== Transport ==
Andal CD Block has 8 originating/ terminating bus routes.

The Bardhaman-Asansol section, which is a part of Howrah-Gaya-Delhi line, Howrah-Allahabad-Mumbai line and Howrah-Delhi main line, passes through this CD Block and there is a station at Andal.

The Andal-Sainthia branch line originates from Andal.

NH 19 (old numbering NH 2)/ Grand Trunk Road passes through this CD Block.

Kazi Nazrul Islam Airport is a domestic airport at Andal, Durgapur. The airport has been built over 650 acres and was officially inaugurated in 2013. It is 15 km from Durgapur's City Centre and 25 km from Asasol's city bus terminus.

== Education ==
In 2013-14, Andal CD Block had 61 primary schools with 9,424 students, 8 middle schools with 526 students, 9 high school with 6,350 students and 11 higher secondary schools with 13,804 students. Andal CD Block had 1 general college with 1,624 students, 3 technical/ professional institutions with 420 students, 293 institutions for special and non-formal education with 11,750 students

Khandra College was established at Khandra in 1981. It is affiliated with Kazi Nazrul University.

== Healthcare ==
In 2014, Andal CD Block had 1 block primary health centre, 2 primary health centres, 3 central government/ PSU medical centres and 6 private nursing homes with total 274 beds and 40 doctors (excluding private bodies). It had 47 family welfare sub centres. 7,937 patients were treated indoor and 311,148 patients were treated outdoor in the hospitals, health centres and subcentres of the CD Block.

Khandra Rural Hospital, with 30 beds, at Khandra, is the major government medical facility in the Andal CD block. There are primary health centres at Andal (with 6 beds) and Baska (with 10 beds). Ondal Railway Hopital at Andal, with 50 beds, FCI Hospital at Andal, with 50 beds and ECL Bankola Area Hospital at Khandra, with 50 beds are functional within the block area.
