= Paschim Bardhaman district =

District in West Bengal, India

Paschim Bardhaman district Pōshchim Bôrdhōmān Jelā (Bengali)
- District of West Bengal
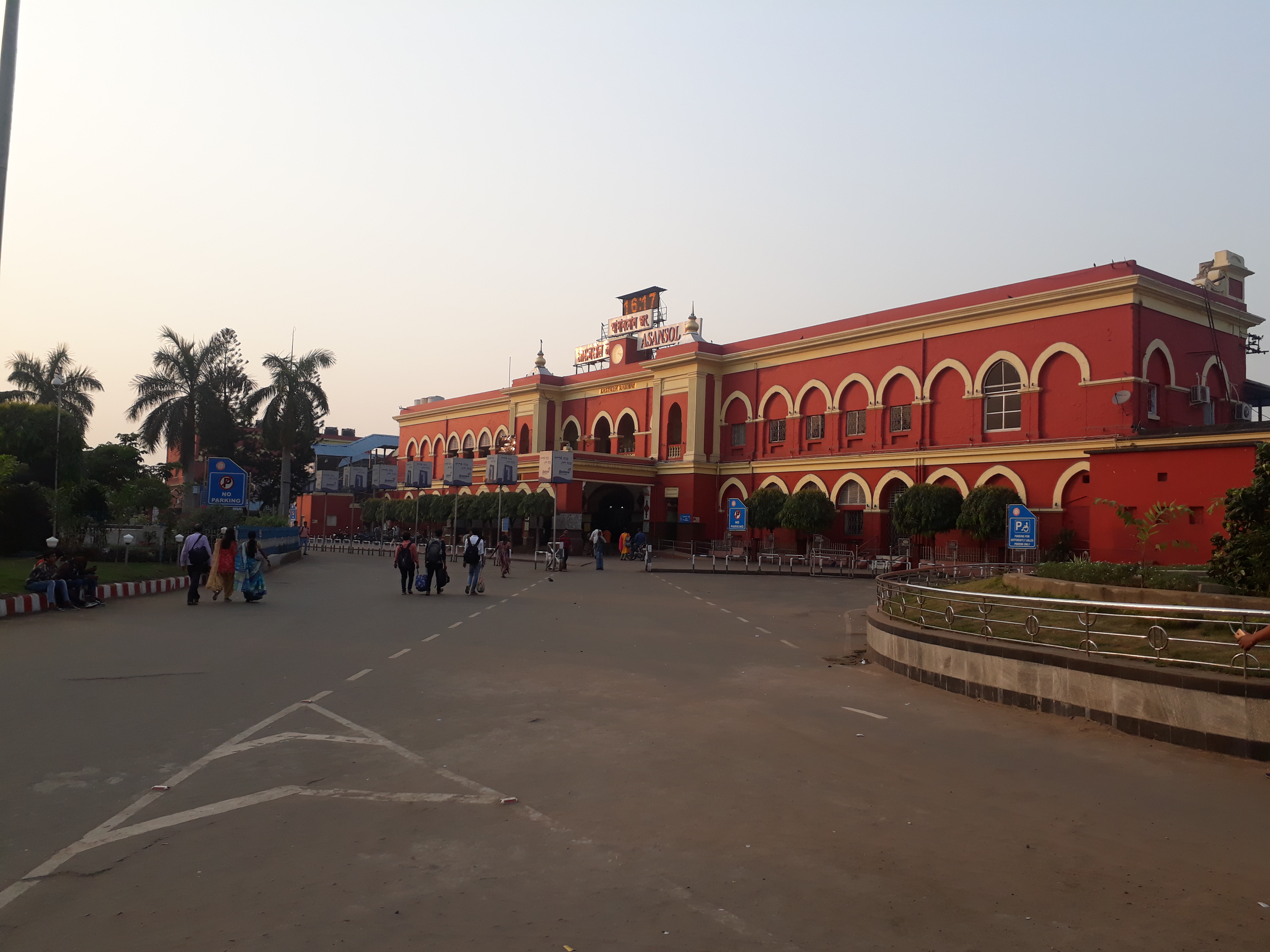
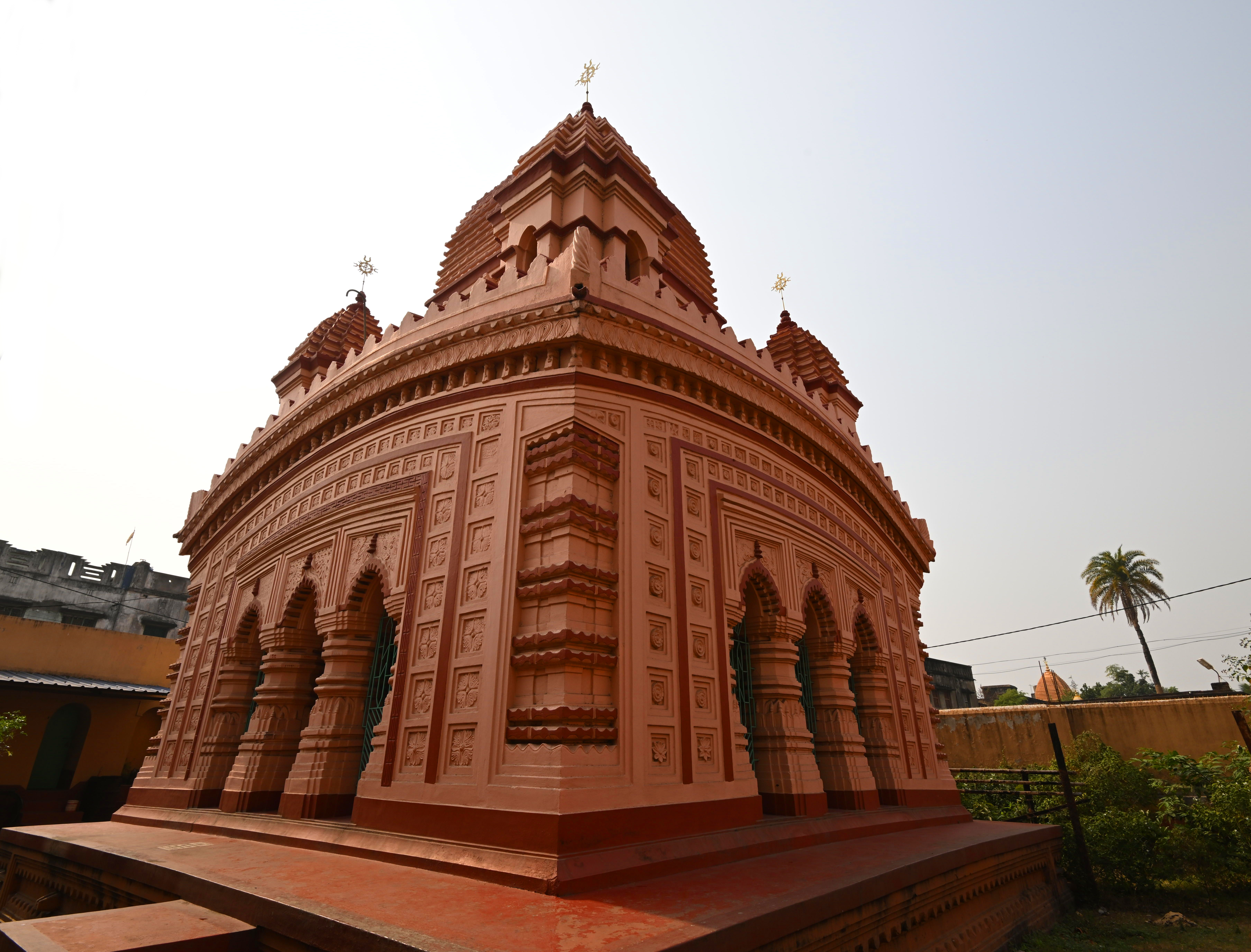
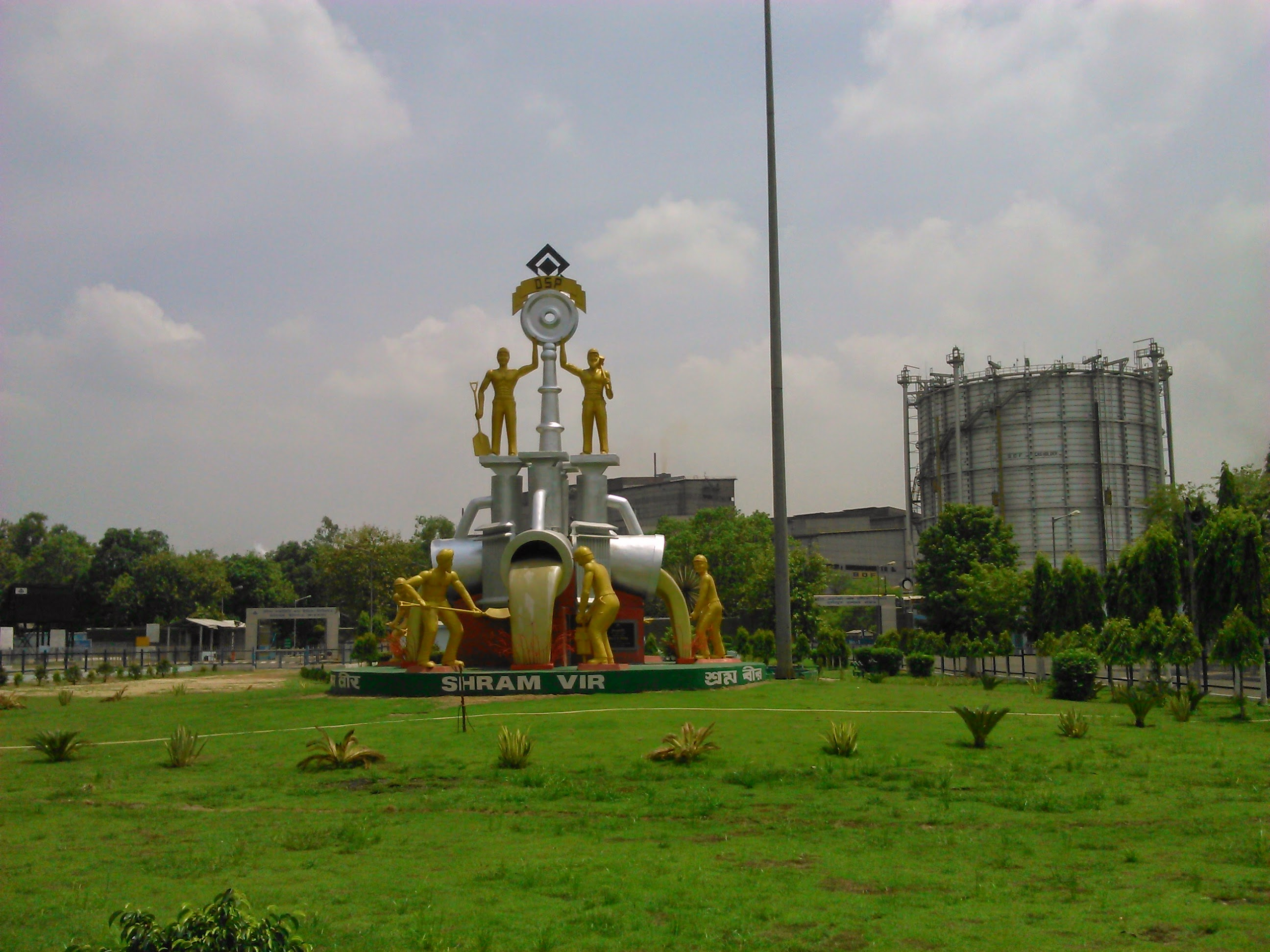
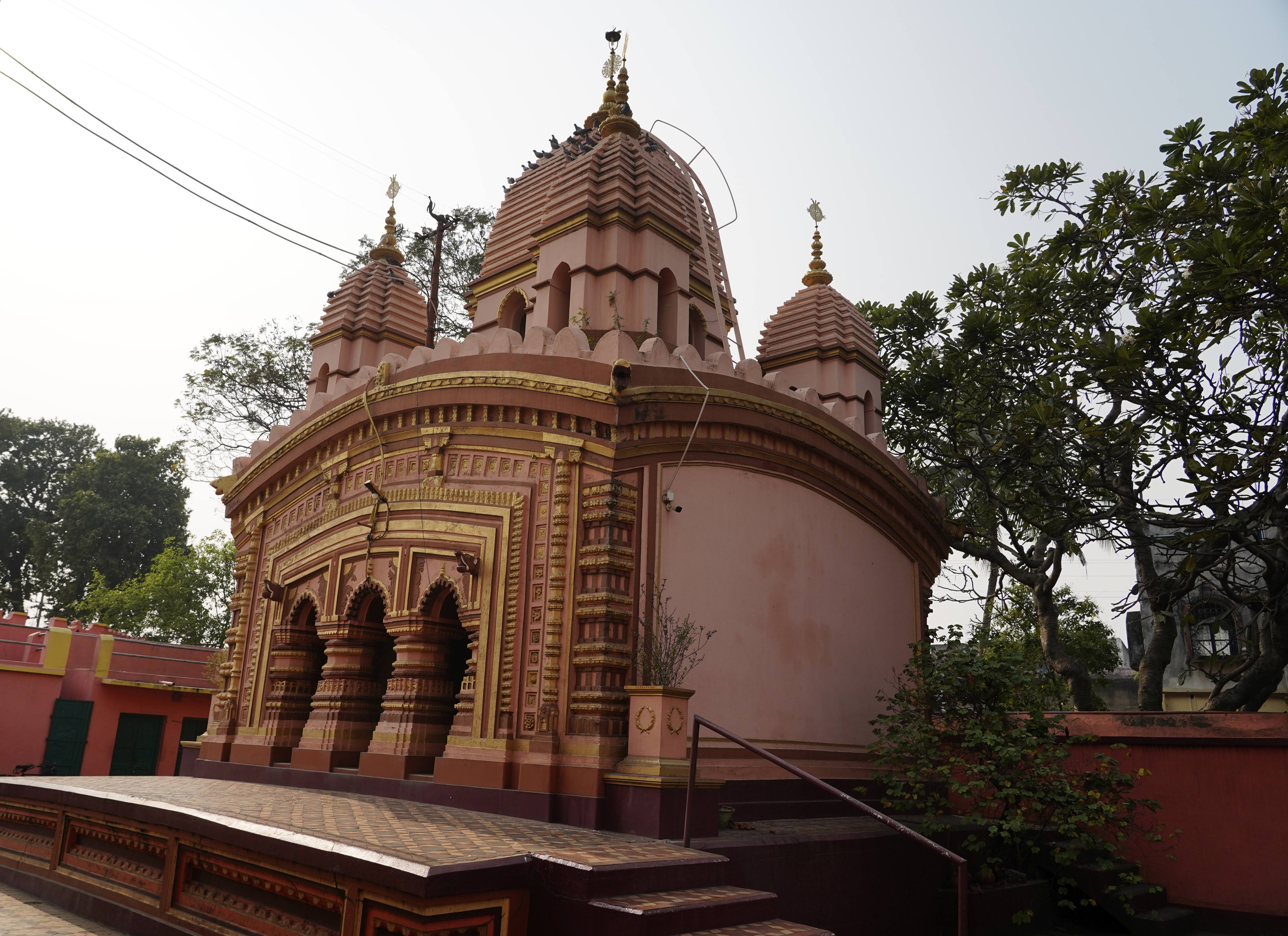
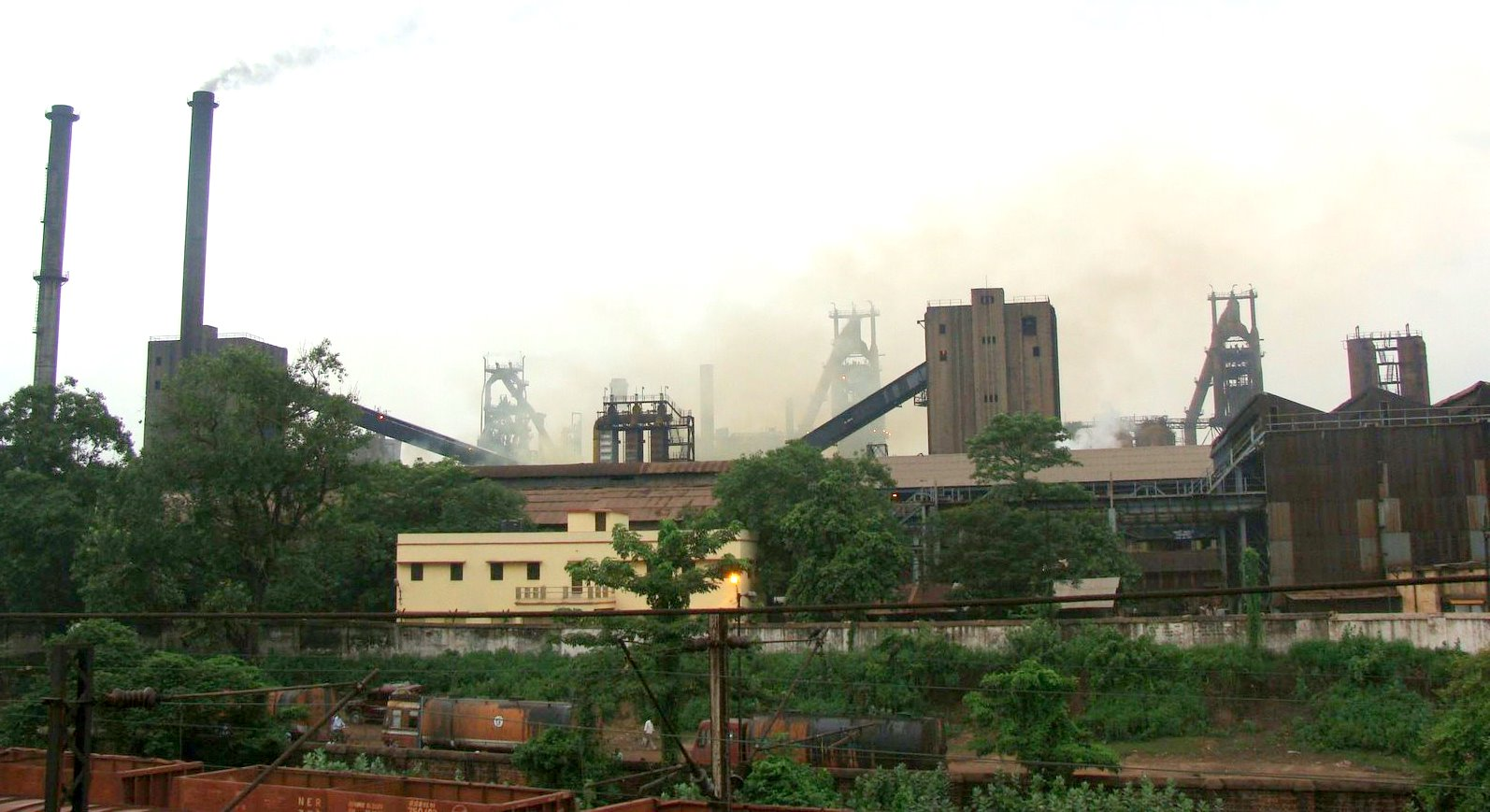
- Clockwise from top-left: Asansol railway station, Radhamadhab Temple in Khandra, Sita-Rama Temple in Ukhra, IISCO Steel Plant, Shram Vir statue in Durgapur steel plant

- Location of Paschim Bardhaman district in West Bengal
- Coordinates: 23.68°N 86.99°E
- Country: India
- State: West Bengal
- Division: Burdwan
- Headquarters: Asansol

Government
  - Subdivisions: Asansol Sadar, Durgapur
  - CD Blocks: Salanpur, Barabani, Jamuria, Raniganj, Andal, Pandabeswar, Faridpur-Durgapur, Kanksa
  - Lok Sabha constituencies: Asansol, Bardhaman-Durgapur
  - Vidhan Sabha constituencies: Asansol Uttar, Asansol Dakshin, Barabani, Durgapur Purba, Durgapur Paschim, Jamuria, Kulti, Pandabeswar, Raniganj

Area
  - Total: 1,603.17 km^{2} (618.99 sq mi)

Population (2011)
  - Total: 2,882,031
  - Density: 1,797.71/km^{2} (4,656.04/sq mi)

Demographics
  - Literacy: 78.75 per cent
  - Sex ratio: 922 ♂/♀

Languages
  - Official: Bengali
  - Additional official: English
- Time zone: UTC+05:30 (IST)
- Website: paschimbardhaman.gov.in

Paschim Bardhaman district is a predominantly urban mining-industrial district in West Bengal. The headquarter of the district is Asansol. It was formed on 7 April 2017 after bifurcation of the erstwhile Bardhaman district as the 23rd district of West Bengal.

== Etymology ==
Some historians link the name of the district to the 24th and last Jain tirthankara, Mahavira Vardhamana, who came to preach in the area. Alternatively, Bardhamana means a prosperous and growing area. It was a forward frontier zone in the progress of Aryanisation by the people in the Upper Gangetic valley. Paschim means west.

== History ==
Microliths found at Birbhanpur, near Durgapur, indicate settlements in the Ajay valley in the Paleolithic/ Mesolithic age, around 5,000 BC.

In early historical times Bardhamanbhukti, a part of the Rarh region, was ruled successively by the Magadhas, Mauryas, Kushanas and Guptas. In the 7th century AD, when Shashanka was king, the area was part of the Gauda Kingdom. It was ruled by the Palas and Senas, till Bakhtiyar Khilji captured it in 1199 AD.

The early Muslim rulers ruled over major parts of Bengal from Gauda or Lakhnauti. In Ain-i-Akbari, Bardhaman is mentioned as a mahal or pargana of Sarcar Sharifabad. The area between the Damodar and the Ajay river was referred to Gopbhum, where the Yadav kings ruled. There are remains of the period at Shymarupar Garh and Ichhai Ghosher deul in Kanksa CD Block.

In 1689, Raja Krishnaram Roy, of the Bardhaman Raj family, obtained a farman (royal decree) from Aurangzeb by which he was made the zamindar (landlord) of Bardhaman, and since then the Raj family's history became identical with that of the district. There are references to the Raja of Panchkot being zamindar of certain sections (mostly the western part) of what later became Asansol subdivision. There also are references to the Raja of Searsole being zamindar of the Raniganj area.

After the death of Aurangzeb, the Mughal Empire became weak and Murshid Quli Khan became the Nawab of Bengal, owning only nominal allegiance to the Mughal emperor. At that time Bardhaman was referred to as chakla, a change from the earlier pargana. Subsequently, during the reign of Alivardi Khan, the Bargis attacked and plundered Bardhaman.

After the victory of the British in the Battle of Plassey in 1757, the fertile district of Bardhaman, along with Medinipur and Chittagong, was ceded to the East India Company. In 1857, the British Crown took over the administration of the country from the East India Company.

In 1765, when East India Company acquired the diwani of Bardhaman, it was composed of Bardhaman, Bankura, Hooghly and a third of Birbhum. In 1805, the western parganas of Shergarh and Senpahari (which later formed Asansol subdivision) and parts of Bankura were formed into a new district called Jungle Mahals. Shergarh and Senpahari was restored to Bardhaman, when Bankura was made into a separate district. Hooghly was separated in 1820, Bankura and Birbhum in 1837. At the time of the Permanent Settlement of Lord Cornwallis in 1793, the chaklas were reduced in size, in order to make them more manageable, and districts were created. Six subdivisions were created in Bardhaman district – Bud Bud in 1846, Katwa, Raniganj, Jahanabad (later named Arambagh), Bardhaman Sadar in 1847 and Kalna in 1850. In 1906, Raniganj subdivision was converted to Asansol subdivision. The parganas were converted to thanas (police stations). At that time there were 22 thanas in Bardhaman district. Later, Jahanabad was transferred out of Bardhaman. Some minor changes went on taking place. Durgapur subdivision was carved out of Asansol subdivision in 1968.

The Permanent Settlement ultimately led to the dismemberment of the Bardhaman estate. As the rajas often failed to pay the rent demands, some parts of the estate were auctioned off. However, there were bright spots even in the later period of the rule of Bardhaman zamindary till the abolition of zamindary system in 1954, after independence of the country.

Bardhaman district was bifurcated into two districts, Purba Bardhaman and Paschim Bardhaman, on 7 April 2017.

== Geography ==
The rocky undulating topography with laterite soil found in Paschim Bardhaman district is a sort of extension of the Chota Nagpur Plateau. For ages the area was heavily forested and infested with plunderers and marauders. The discovery of coal in the 18th century led to industrialisation. Most of the forests in the coal-bearing areas have been cleared but some areas in the eastern part of the district remained thickly forested till more recent times and some are still there. The eastern part of the district gradually slopes down to the rice plains of the agriculturally rich Purba Bardhaman district.

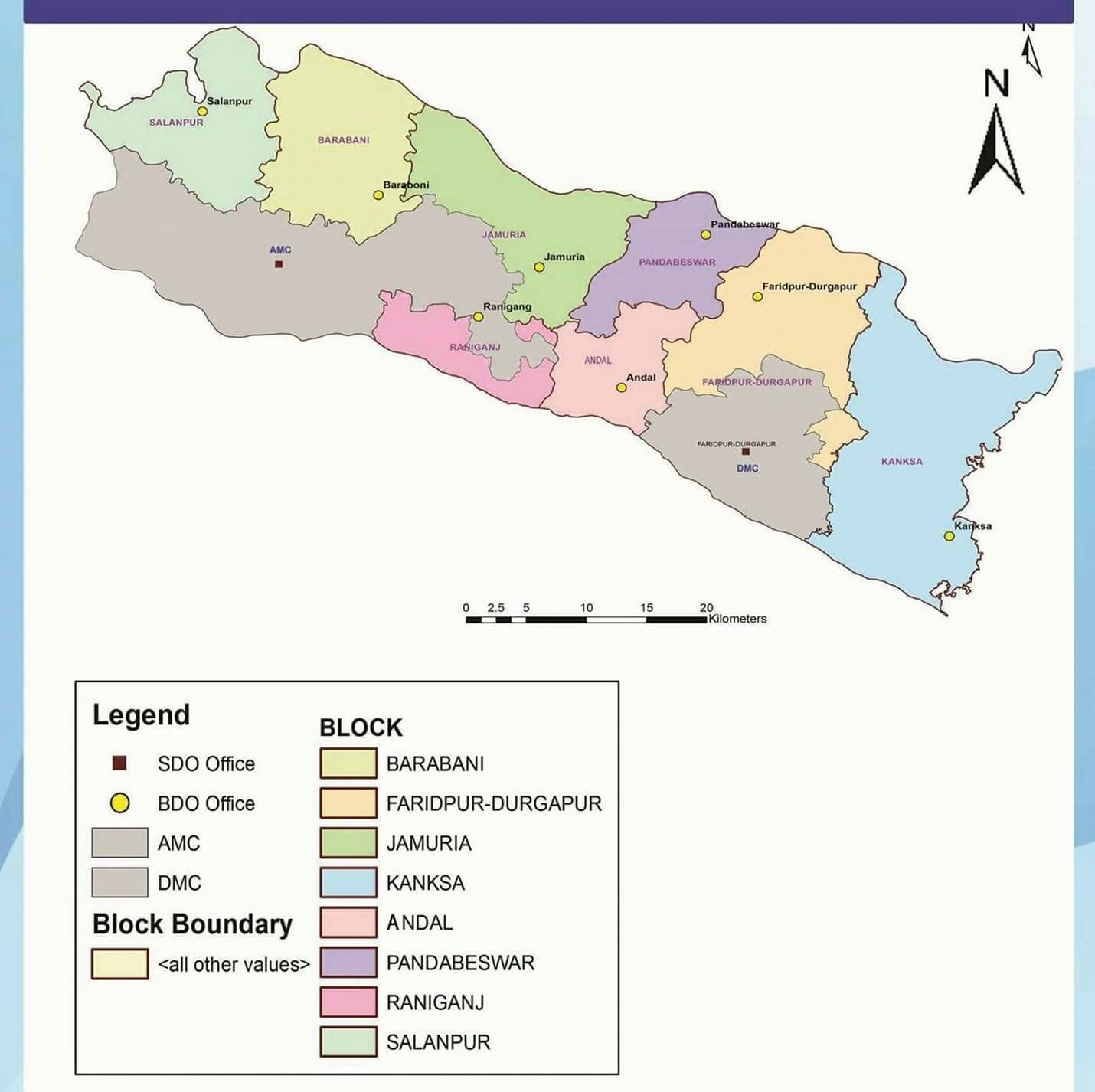
Map of Paschim Bardhaman district

== Administrative divisions ==
The district comprises two subdivisions: Asansol Sadar subdivision and Durgapur subdivision. In Paschim Bardhaman district, there are 8 CD block under two subdivision. In Asansol Sadar subdivision, there are 4 CD block - Salanpur, Barabani, Jamuria and Raniganj. In Durgapur subdivision, there are 4 CD block - Andal, Pandabeswar, Faridpur-Durgapur and Kanksa.

Asansol is the district headquarters. There are 16 police stations, 8 development blocks, 2 municipal corporations, 62 gram panchayats in this district.

Other than municipality areas, each subdivision contains community development blocks which, in turn, are divided into rural areas and census towns. In total there are 66 urban units: 2 municipal corporations, 3 municipalities (which have subsequently been absorbed in Asansol Municipal Corporation) and 65 census towns.

There are two urban agglomerations (UA).

- Asansol, Kulti, Bhanowara, Jamuria, Jemari, Raniganj, Amkula, Murgathaul, Raghunathchak and Ballavpur together form the Asansol UA.
- Durgapur UA consists of Durgapur, Arrah, Bamunara, Amlajora, Kanksa, Panagarh, Mankar, Shibpur, Andal, Ukhra, Kajora, Pandabeswar, Ichhapur and Madhaiganj.

Asansol Sadar subdivision

Asansol Sadar subdivision has 10 police stations, 4 community development blocks, 4 panchayat samitis, 35 gram panchayats, 181 mouzas, 165 inhabited villages, 1 municipal corporation, 3 municipalities and 26 census towns+1 (partly). The single municipal corporation is at Asansol. The municipalities are at: Raniganj, Jamuria and Kulti. The census towns are: Chittaranjan, Hindustan Cables Town, Domohani, Bhanowara, Majiara, Pangachhiya, Charanpur, Kunustara, Topsi, Nimsa, Chinchuria, Kenda, Parasia, Ratibati, Chapui, Jemari (J.K. Nagar Township), Banshra, Belebathan, Chelad, Murgathaul, Amkula, Baktarnagar, Egara, Sahebganj, Raghunathchak, Ballavpur and Kendra Khottamdi (partly). The subdivision has its headquarters at Asansol.

According to the Kolkata Gazette notification of 3 June 2015, the municipal areas of Kulti, Raniganj and Jamuria were included within the jurisdiction of Asansol Municipal Corporation.

Durgapur subdivision

Durgapur subdivision has 6 police stations, 4 community development blocks, 4 panchayat samitis, 27 gram panchayats, 171 mouzas, 151 inhabited villages, 1 municipal corporation and 39 census towns+1 (partly). The single municipal corporation is at Durgapur. The census towns are: Siduli, Khandra, Chak Bankola, Ukhra, Mahira, Dakshin Khanda, Parashkol, Kajora, Harishpur, Palashban, Dignala, Andal (gram), Ondal, Baska, Bilpahari, Ramnagar, Dalurband, Baidyanathpur, Mahal, Konardihi, Nabgram, Sankarpur, Haripur, Chhora, Bahula, Mandarbani, Banagram, Sirsha, Nabaghanapur, Sarpi, Ichhapur, Arra, Gopalpur, Bamunara, Amlajora, Kanksa, Debipur, Prayagpur and Kendra Khottamdi (part). The subdivision has its headquarters at Durgapur.

Urban-rural divide

The urban-rural divide of the two administrative subdivisions are as follows:

Subdivision	Headquarters	Area km^{2}	Population (2011)	Rural population % (2011)	Urban population % (2011)
Asansol Sadar	Asansol	831.89	1,672,659	16.67	83.33
Durgapur	Durgapur	771.28	1,209,372	20.78	79.22
Paschim Bardhaman district	Asansol	1,603.17	2,882,031	18.39	81.61

=== Assembly constituencies ===
No.	Name	Lok Sabha	MLA	2026 Winner	2024 Lead
275	Pandabeswar	Asansol	Jitendra Tiwari	Bharatiya Janata Party	Trinamool Congress
276	Durgapur Purba	Bardhaman–Durgapur	Chandra Shekhar Banerjee	Bharatiya Janata Party	Trinamool Congress
277	Durgapur Paschim	Bardhaman–Durgapur	Lakshman Chandra Ghorui	Bharatiya Janata Party	Bharatiya Janata Party
278	Raniganj	Asansol	Partho Ghosh	Bharatiya Janata Party	Trinamool Congress
279	Jamuria	Asansol	Bijan Mukherjee	Bharatiya Janata Party	Trinamool Congress
280	Asansol Dakshin	Asansol	Agnimitra Paul	Bharatiya Janata Party	Bharatiya Janata Party
281	Asansol Uttar	Asansol	Krishnendu Mukherjee	Bharatiya Janata Party	Trinamool Congress
282	Kulti	Asansol	Ajay Kumar Poddar	Bharatiya Janata Party	Bharatiya Janata Party
283	Barabani	Asansol	Arijit Roy	Bharatiya Janata Party	Trinamool Congress

== Demographics ==
As per the 2011 Census of India data, Paschim Bardhaman district (after bifurcation of Bardhaman district in 2016), had a total population of 2,882,031. There were 1,497,479 (52%) males and 1,384,452 (48%) females. Population below 6 years was 322,268. 2,351,954 (81.61%) lived in urban areas.

As per the 2011 census data the total number of literates in Paschim Bardhaman district, after bifurcation of Bardhaman district in 2017, was 2,015,056 (78.75% of the population over 6 years) out of which males numbered 1,136,990 (85.44% of the male population over 6 years) and females numbered 806,010 (65.55% of the female population over 6 years). Scheduled Castes and Scheduled Tribes made up 628,568 (21.81%) and 161,946 (5.62%) of the population respectively.

Religion in Paschim Bardhaman district (2011)
Hinduism	84.75%
Islam	13.32%
Sikhism	0.51%
Christianity	0.44%
Other (tribal religion)	0.44%
Other or not stated	0.54%

Religion in present-day Paschim Bardhaman District (1941) (Note: Asansol subdivision of Burdwan district)
Religion	Population (1941)	Percentage (1941)	Population (2011)	Percentage (2011)
Hinduism	471,334	77.82%	2,442,414	84.75%
Tribal religion (Note: In the 1941 census all tribals were counted under 'Tribal' religion, irrespective of their actual religion.)	66,857	11.04%	12,572	0.44%
Islam	59,089	9.76%	384,027	13.32%
Christianity	3,027	0.50%	12,636	0.44%
Others (Note: Including Jainism, Christianity, Buddhism, Zoroastrianism, Judaism, Ad-Dharmis, or not stated)	5,382	0.88%	30,382	1.05%
Total Population	605,689	100%	2,882,031	100%

In the 2011 census Hindus were the majority with 2,442,414 (84.75%) in Paschim Bardhaman district. Muslims numbered 384,027 (13.32%), Sikhs were 14,754 (0.51%), almost entirely in urban areas such as Asansol and Durgapur. Christians numbered 12,636 (0.44%) of the population. Other religions (including indigenous religions such as Sarna) numbered 42,954 (1.49%) of the population.

Languages of Paschim Bardhaman district (2011)
1. Bengali (58.2%)
2. Hindi (26.8%)
3. Urdu (7.64%)
4. Santali (4.47%)
5. Others (2.93%)

According to the 2011 census, 58.18% of the population in what is now Paschim Bardhaman district spoke Bengali, 26.78% Hindi, 7.64% Urdu and 4.47% Santali as their first language.

== Economy ==
=== Coal mining ===
Coal mining in India first started in the Raniganj Coalfield. In 1774, John Sumner and Suetonius Grant Heatly of the British East India Company found coal near Ethora, presently in Salanpur CD Block.

In 1973, the Government of India took over the management of all non-coking coal mines in the country and in 1975 Coal India was formed to manage the coking and non-coking coal mines.

Eastern Coalfields has been producing around 30 million tonnes per annum from its open cast mines, it has been modernising its underground mines to produce around 10 million tonnes per annum from its underground mines.

=== Railways ===
Narayankuri ghat, on the Damodar, was used by Carr Tagore & Company for transporting coal to Kolkata by boat in the middle of the nineteenth century. Varying levels of water in the Damodar posed problems for transportation. In order to capture the lucrative coal transport business, East Indian Railway laid lines up to Raniganj in 1855. It captured the entire coal transport business. The line was extended to Asansol in 1863.

The Howrah-Delhi main line via Asansol and Patna of East Indian Railway was made operable in 1871 and the Grand Chord from Sitarampur to Mughalsarai was completed in 1901, shortening the travel distance between Howrah and Delhi. Bengal Nagpur Railway linked its operations in the Nagpur-Chandil sector to Asansol in 1887. With all these links Asansol emerged as a major railway junction.

Asansol has an electric loco shed and an EMU shed. There is a diesel loco shed at Andal and Andal also has a large goods yard, apart from those at Sitrampur and Barakar. Asansol Division of Eastern Railway handles around 1,300 wagons of coal every day.

=== Industry ===
IISCO Steel Plant of Steel Authority of India Limited at Burnpur has a crude steel production capacity of 2.5 million tonnes per year. The modernisation and expansion programme of IISCO Steel Plant was implemented with an investment of over Rs 16,000 crore As of 2015, the investment for modernisation was the single largest investment in West Bengal till then. Established in 1918, the Indian Iron and Steel Company (IISCO) was amalgamated with SAIL in 2006 and renamed IISCO Steel Plant.

Chittaranjan Locomotive Works is one of the largest electric locomotive manufacturers in the world. Established in 1950, it produced steam locomotives up to 1972. Ballavpur Paper Mnfg. Ltd. (earlier Bengal Paper Mill) at Ballavpur started production in 2009 after revamp.

Among the other industries at Asansol are: Burn Standard (earlier Indian Standard Wagon), Sen Raleigh cycle factory (not a productive unit any more), Hindustan Pilkington glass factory (not a productive unit any more), Dhakeswari Cotton Mills (not a productive unit any more), Kulti Works of SAIL Growth Division and Hindustan Cables at Rupnarayanpur (not a productive unit any more).

Durgapur Steel Plant of Steel Authority of India, set up in the fifties, has a rated capacity of 2.2 million tonnes of crude steel, after expansion and modernisation. The plant is consistently performing at beyond its rated capacity.

Durgapur Barrage was built by Damodar Valley Corporation in 1955 and handed over, along with the canal network, to the Government of West Bengal in 1964.

Among the other industrial units at Durgpur are: Alloy Steels Plant of SAIL, Durgapur Projects Limited, Mining and Allied Machinery Corporation (not a productive unit any more), Alstom Power Boilers Ltd. (earlier known as ACC-Vickers Babcock and later as ACC-Babcock), Philips Carbon Black Limited, Sankey Wheels (a unit of GKW), Birla Cement (earlier Durgapur Cement Ltd.), Graphite India Limited, Durgapur Chemicals, Bharat Ophathalmic Glass Limited (not a productive unit any more) and Hindustan Fertilizer Corporation (not a productive unit any more).

Between 2001 and 2007 Durgapur saw the setting up of around a dozen middle to large scale industrial investment in iron and steel manufacturing sector. The prominent investors are MB Group, Jai Balaji group, SPS group, Adhunik Group of Industries, Neo Metallic, Stolberg India, Super Smelters Ltd, Shyam Steel and UltraTech Cement.

Among the industrial areas in the district are: Durgapur Industrial Area, Industrial Complex at Rajbandh, Industrial Estate at Kalyanpur, Asansol, Raniganj Industrial Estate, Panagarh Industrial Park, Aluminium and Non-Ferrous Metal Park and Salanpur Industrial Park.

IT industry in the area is slowly picking up with the small IT hubs scattered around Durgapur and Asansol.

Along with this the area is running a parallel economy in illegal mining of coal and sand. Various groups of scrupulous individuals are digging mine shafts and extracting coals illegally which are sold to the small scale industries at less than government rates. The illegal sand mining at Damodar river has damaged the natural flow of the river, caused due to rise in demand for construction of houses and factories recently

== Educational institutions ==
The district has a number of colleges imparting education in engineering, management, medicines, law, science and other technological and general courses. There is only one university in the district namely Kazi Nazrul University. Some of the well known institutes are:

- Asansol Girls' College
- Asansol Engineering College
- Banwarilal Bhalotia College, Asansol
- Bidhan Chandra College, Asansol
- Deshbandhu Mahavidyalaya
- Bengal College of Engineering & Technology Durgapur
- Bengal Homoeopathic Medical College and Hospital Asansol
- Central Mechanical Engineering Research Institute Durgapur
- Dr. B.C. Roy Engineering College, Durgapur
- Dr. B.C. Roy College of Pharmacy & Allied Health Science, Durgapur
- Durgapur Government College
- Durgapur Institute of Legal Studies
- Durgapur Women's College
- Gupta College of Technological Sciences, Asansol
- IQ City Medical College Durgapur
- Jawahar Navodaya Vidyalaya, Durgapur
- Kazi Nazrul University, Asansol
- Kazi Nazrul Islam Mahavidyalaya, Churulia
- Law College Durgapur
- Michael Madhusudan Memorial College
- National Institute of Technology, Durgapur
- National Power Training Institute
- Shri Ramkrishna Institute of Medical Sciences and Sanaka Hospital
- St. Xavier's College, Asansol
- Triveni Devi Bhalotia College

== Notable people ==
- S. S. Ahluwalia, notable politician of the Bharatiya Janata Party (BJP)
- Swami Ashokananda, monk of the Ramakrishna Math, in charge of the Vedanta Society of Northern California, San Francisco from 1932
- Arjun Atwal, Indian professional golfer, the first player born in India to become a member of, and later win a tournament on the U.S.-based PGA Tour
- Abhisek Banerjee, former Indian domestic cricketer
- Meenakshi Banerjee, Indian cyanobacteriologist and presently works as the head of the Center for Applied Algal Research at Rice University in Houston, Texas
- Prayas Ray Barman, cricketer and youngest player to debut in the IPL
- Timir Biswas, Indian playback singer of Bengali and Hindi films, lead singer of the band Fakira
- Sandip Burman, Tabla Player and Musician
- Sudip Chattopadhyay, Indian developmental biologist and biotechnologist
- Rana Chowdhary, Indian cricketer
- Munmun Dutta, Indian actress and model, best known for her portrayal of Babita Iyer in the Hindi sitcom Taarak Mehta Ka Ooltah Chashmah
- Alok Krishna Gupta, Indian mineralogist, petrologist
- Kazi family of Churulia
  - Kazi Nazrul Islam (1899–1976), National Poet of Bangladesh
  - Kazi Sabyasachi (1928–1979), elocutionist
  - Khilkhil Kazi, singer
- Jahanara Khan (born 1967), politician
- Aloke Paul, Indian materials scientist
- Malcolm Roberts, Australian politician for Pauline Hanson's One Nation
- Mika Singh, Indian singer
- Vivek Singh, Indian British celebrity chef and restaurateur
- Bikash Sinha, Indian physicist, chairman of the Board of Governors of the National Institute of Technology, Durgapur in June 2005
- Sharmila Tagore, Indian film actress
- Dilara Zaman, Bangladeshi film and television actress

== Gallery ==
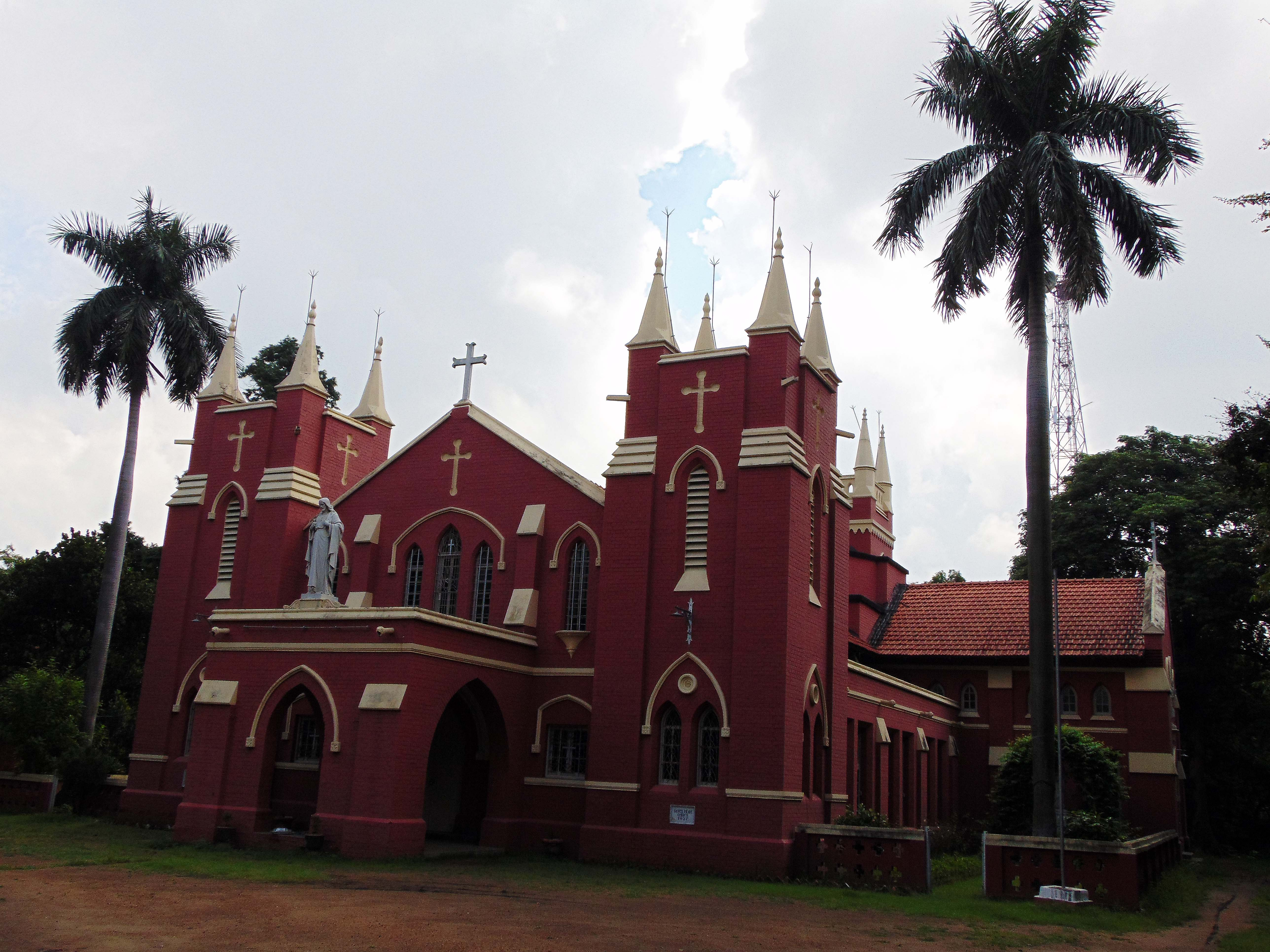
Sacred Heart Church in Asansol

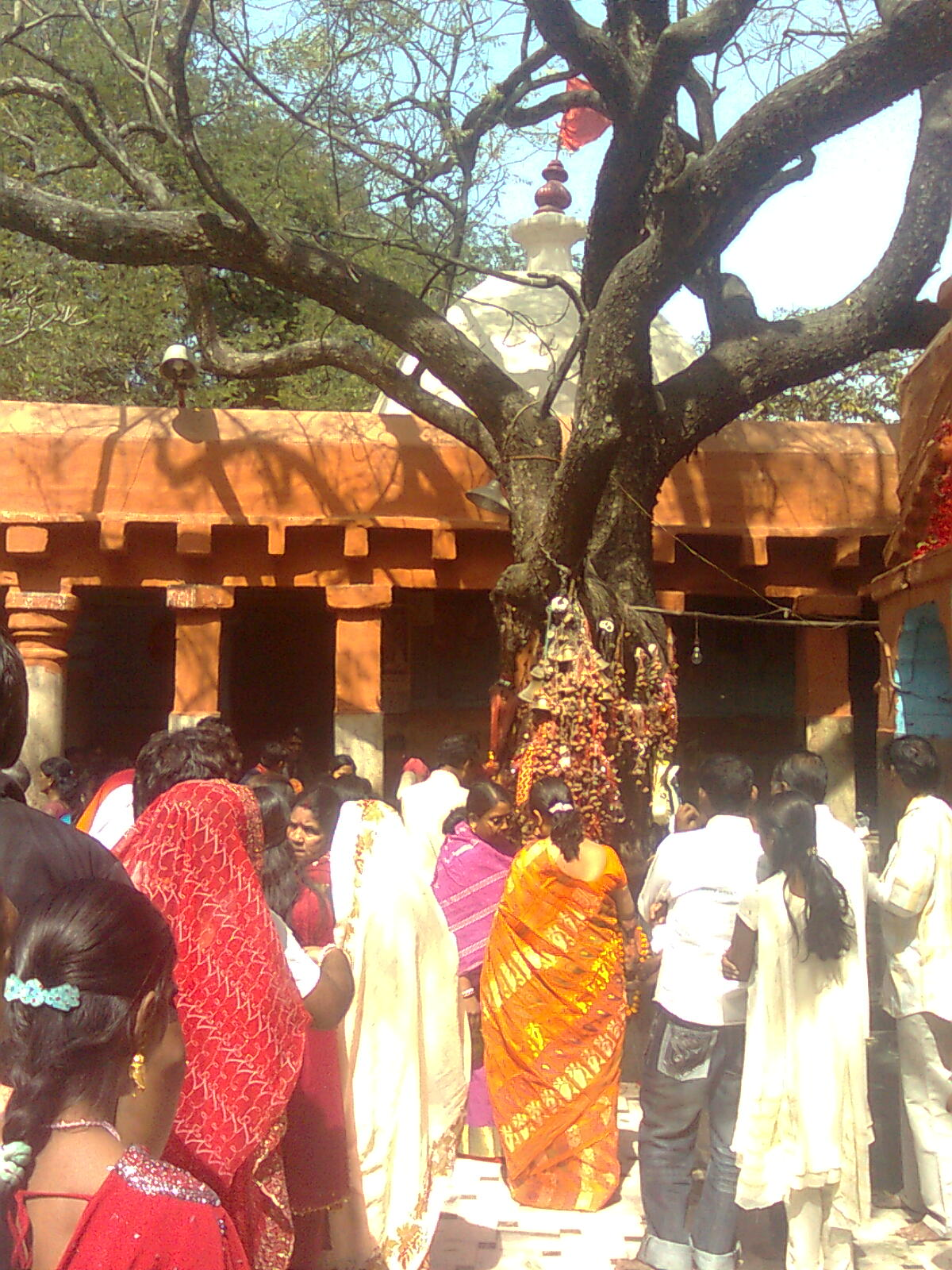
Kalyaneshwari Temple in Asansol

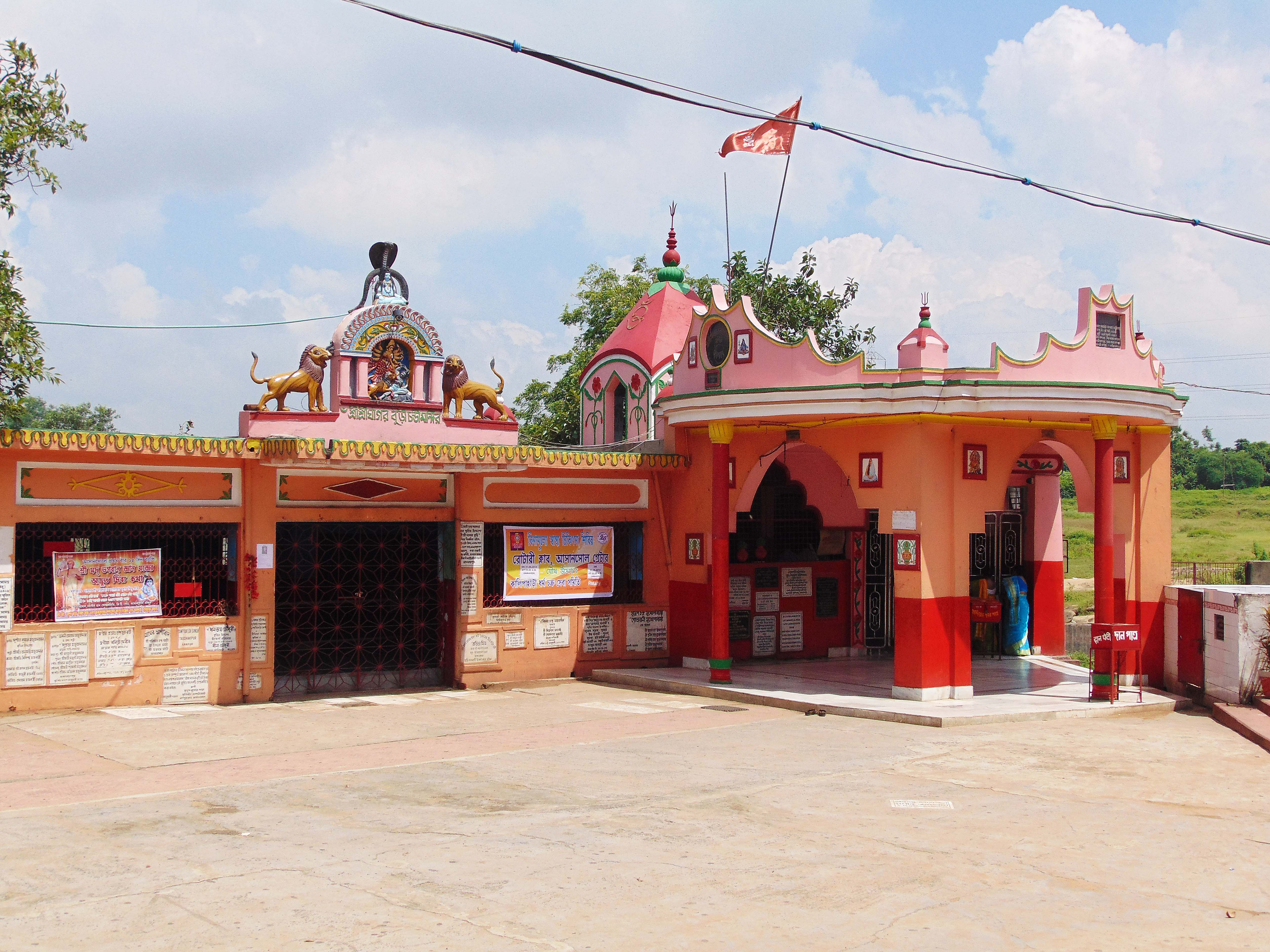
Ghaghar Burhi Chandi Temple in Asansol

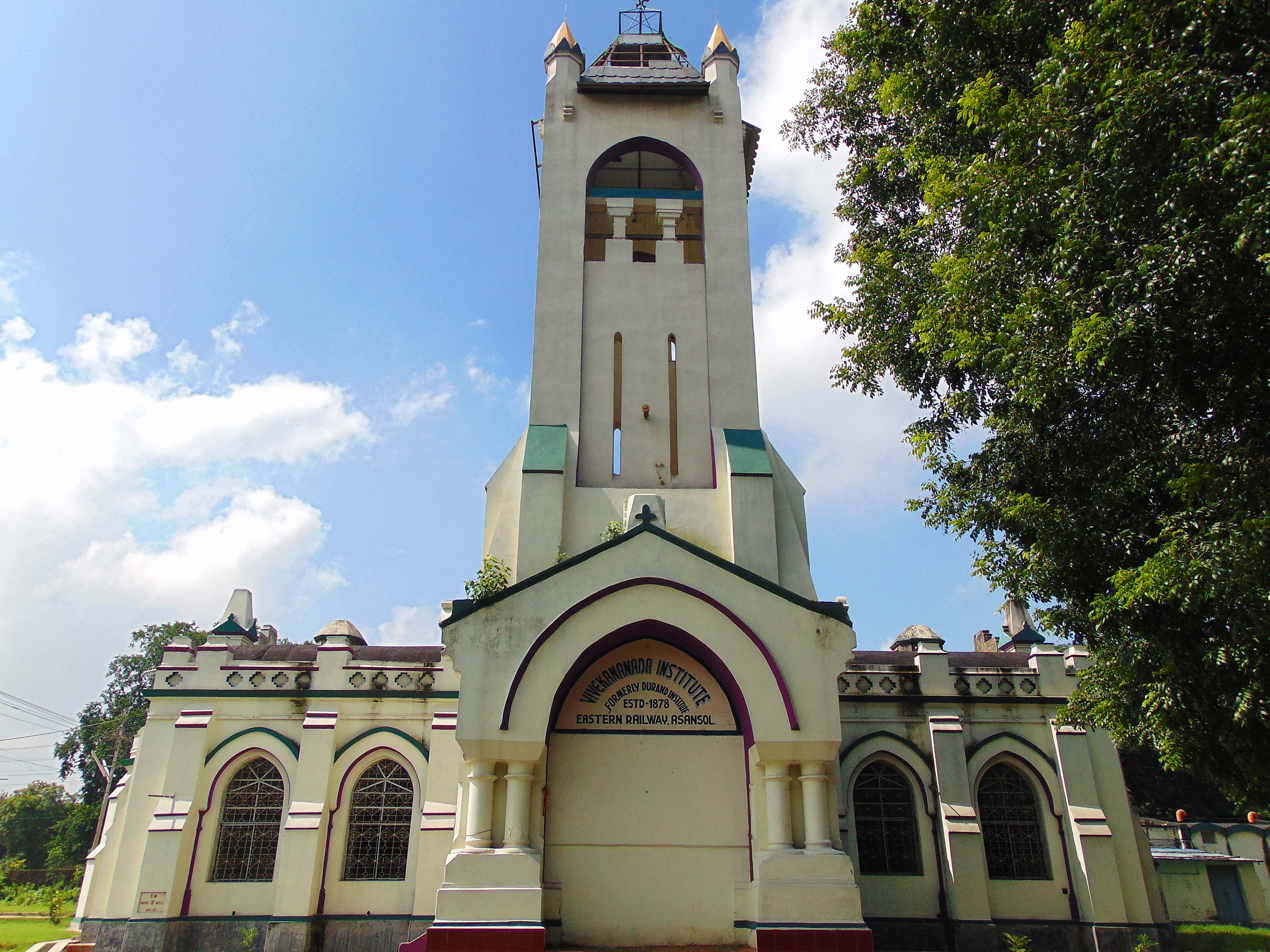
Vivekananda Institute (Durand Institute), Asansol

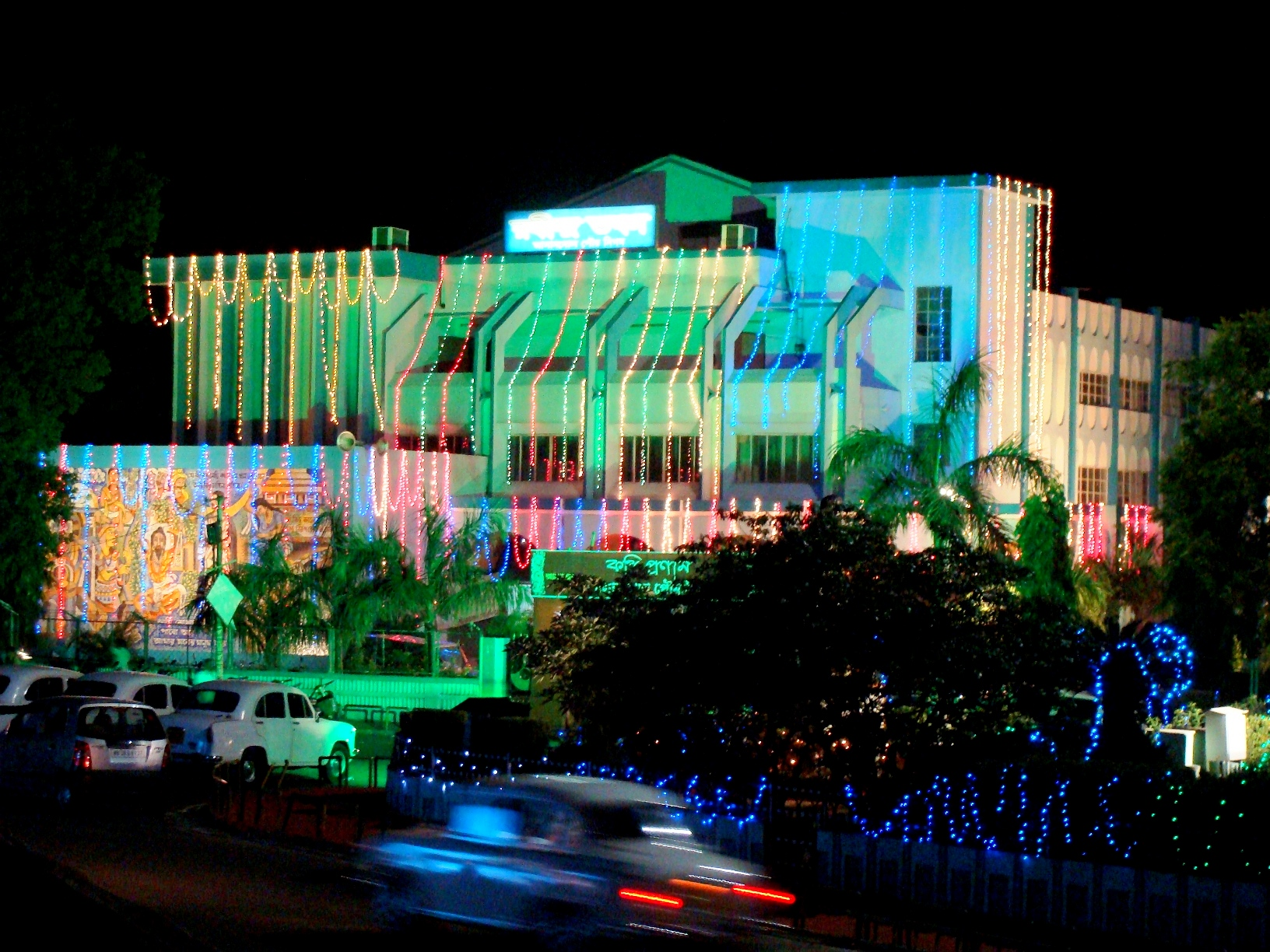
Rabindra Bhawan in Asansol

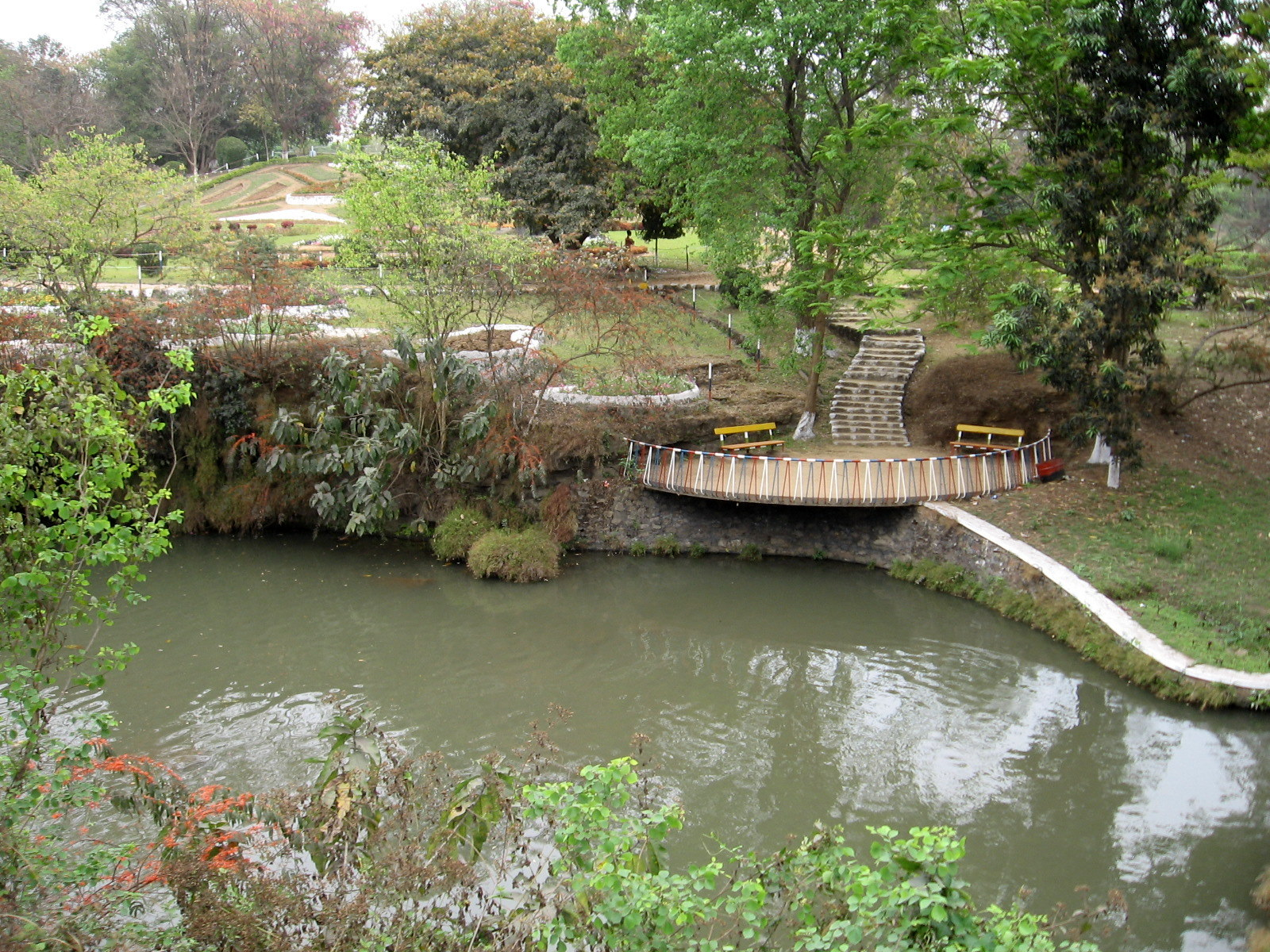
Burnpur Nehru Park in Riverside, Asansol

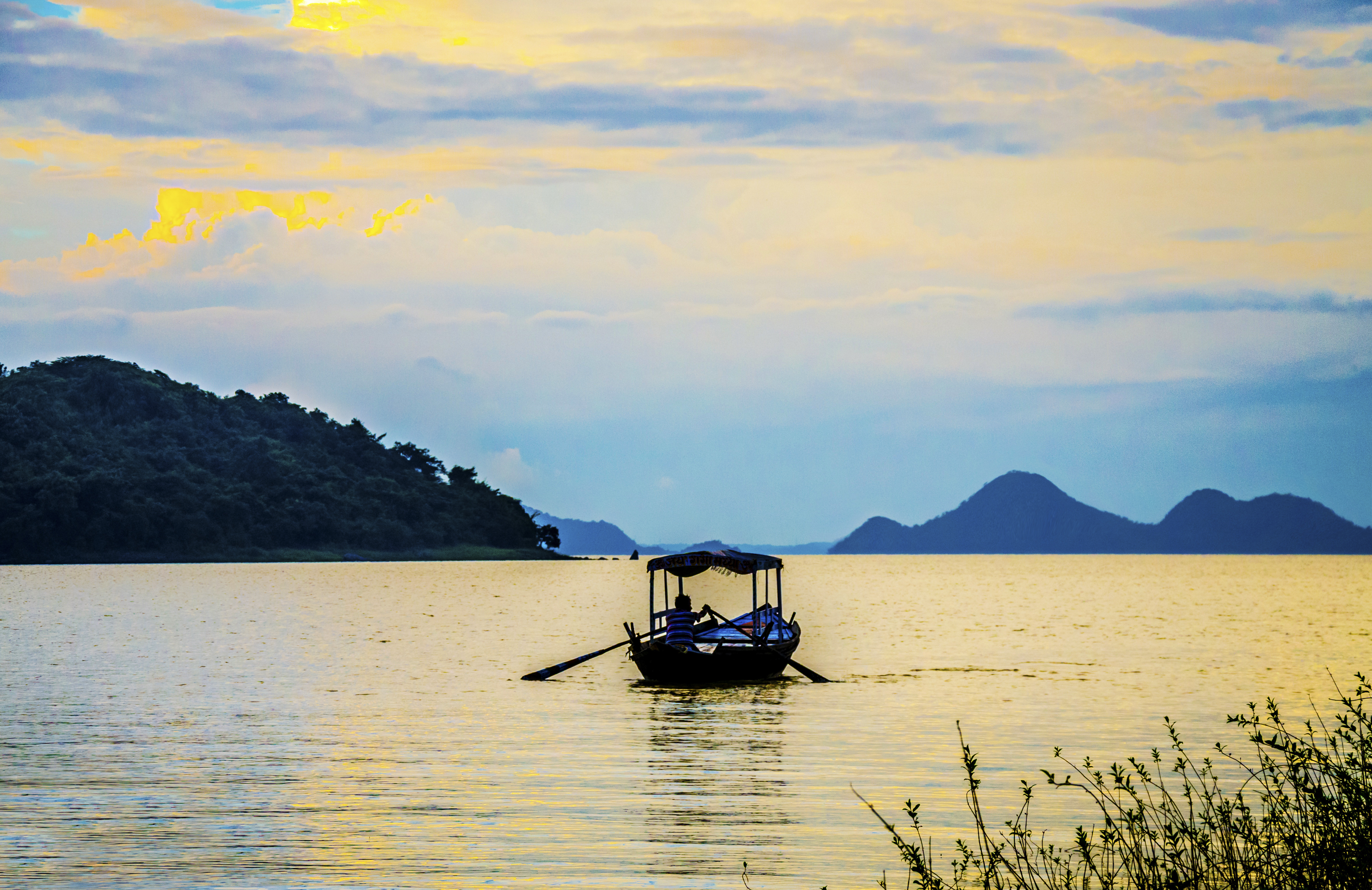
Maithon Dam

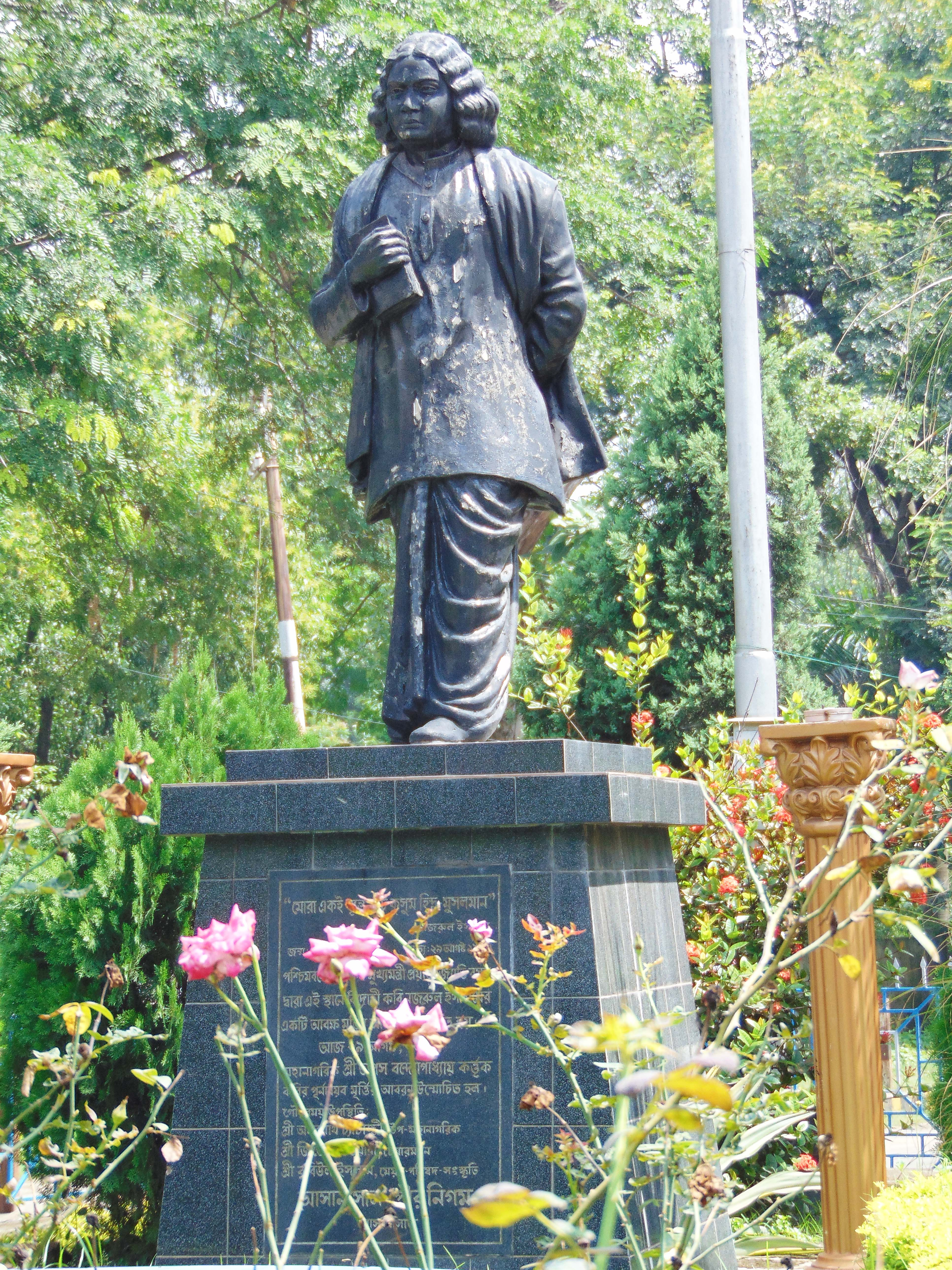
Statue of Kazi Nazrul Islam in Asansol

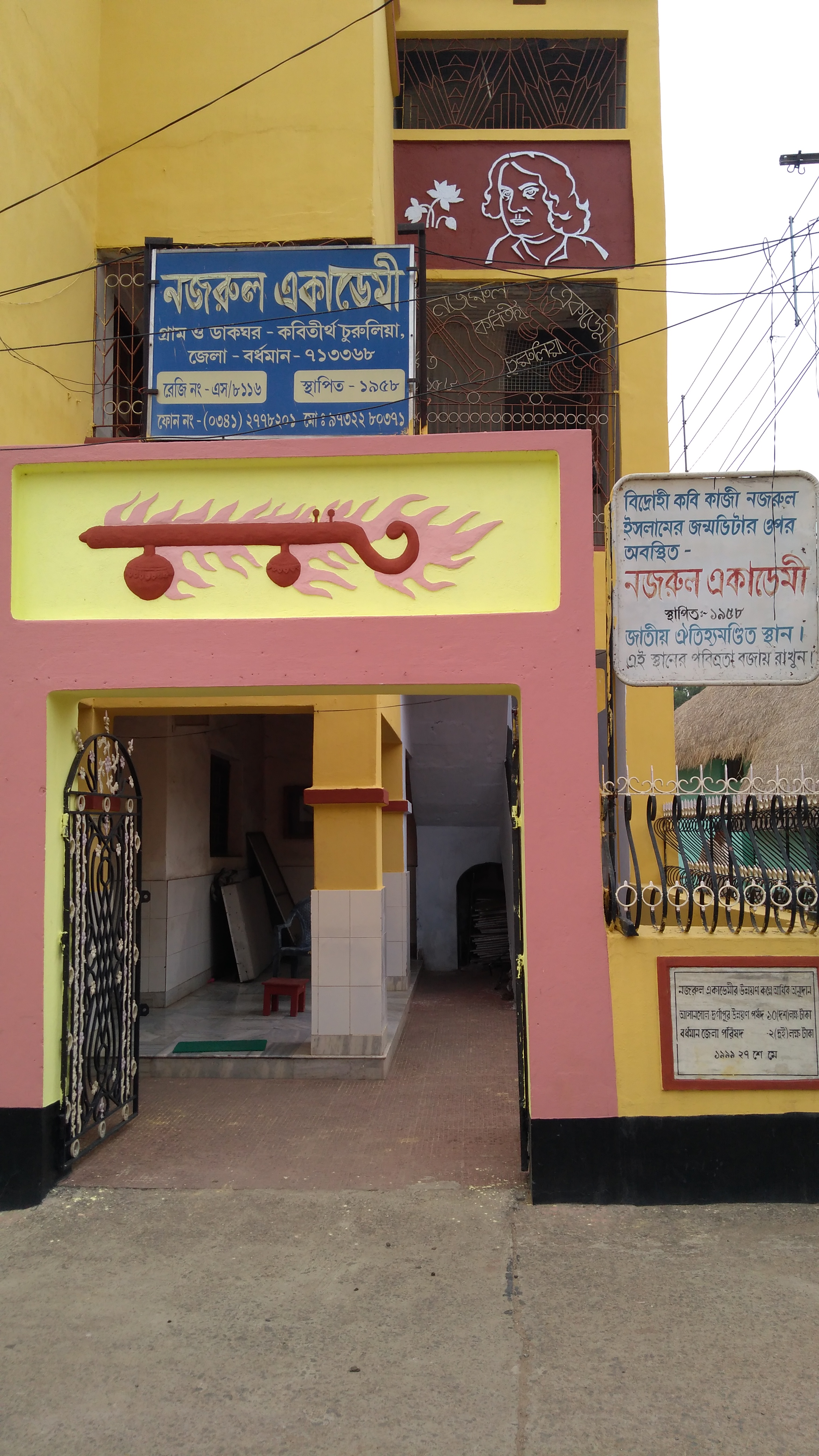
Nazrul Academy; Churulia, Birth Place of Kazi Nazrul Islam.
