= Bidhan Chandra College, Asansol =

College of West Bengal

Bidhan Chandra College
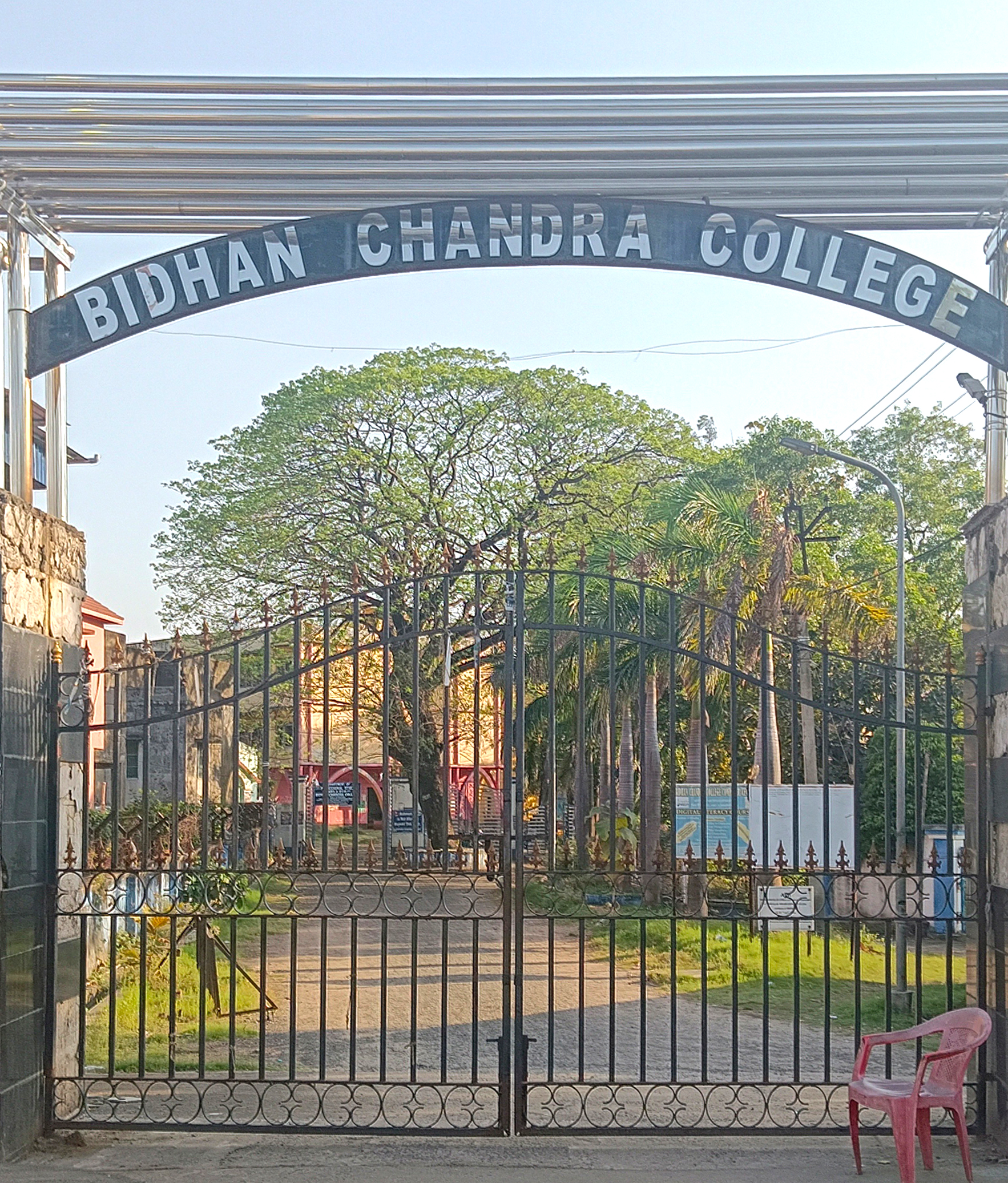
- Type: Undergraduate college
- Established: 1961; 65 years ago
- Affiliations: Kazi Nazrul University, Asansol; NAAC
- Principal: Falguni Mukhopadhyay
- Location: Asansol, West Bengal, India; 23°40′36.91″N 86°57′09.67″E
- Campus: Urban
- Website: http://www.bccollegeasansol.ac.in/

- Location within West Bengal Location within India

Bidhan Chandra College, also known as B.C. College, Asansol, established in 1961, is the well-known college in Asansol, Paschim Bardhaman district. It offers undergraduate courses in arts, commerce and sciences. It is affiliated to Kazi Nazrul University, Asansol.

== Departments and courses ==
The college offers different undergraduate courses and aims at imparting education to the undergraduates of lower- and middle-class people of Asansol and its adjoining areas.

=== Science ===
Science faculty consists of the departments of Chemistry, Physics, Mathematics, Computer Science & Application, Botany, Zoology, and Economics.

=== Arts and Commerce ===
Arts and Commerce faculty consists of departments of Bengali, English, Sanskrit, Hindi, Urdu, History, Geography, Political Science, Philosophy, Finance & Accountancy, and Business Administration.

== Accreditation ==
In 2017 the college was awarded B grade by the National Assessment and Accreditation Council (NAAC). The college is recognized by the University Grants Commission (UGC).

== See also ==
- List of institutions of higher education in West Bengal
- Education in India
- Education in West Bengal
