= Asansol Girls' College =

Women's college of West Bengal, India

- Type: Undergraduate college Public college
- Established: 1950; 76 years ago
- Affiliations: Kazi Nazrul University, Asansol; NAAC
- President: Sri Moloy Ghatak
- Teacher-in-Charge: Dr Sandip Kr. Ghatak
- Students: more than 1000 ♀
- Location: Dr. Anjali Roy Sarani, Asansol, West Bengal, 723304, India; 23.6853102°N 86.9454366°E
- Campus: Urban
- Website: www.agc.ac.in
- Location in West Bengal Asansol Girls' College (India)

Asansol Girls' College is a women's college in Asansol, Paschim Bardhaman district, West Bengal, India. It offers undergraduate courses in arts and sciences. The College is affiliated to Kazi Nazrul University, Asansol, West Bengal, India.

== History ==
The College was established in 1950. They shared the premises of Manimala Girls' High School from their foundation until 1962 when they moved to their own building. For that reason, it became known by local people as Manimala College, but Asansol Girls' College was always the official name. On Establishment Day, a procession goes from the College to Manimala Girls' High School to show respect for its origins.

Initially, the College was affiliated to the University of Calcutta. After Burdwan University started it became affiliated with that university. From 24 June 2015, the college has been affiliated to Asansol's Kazi Nazrul University.

== Former affiliations ==
- University of Calcutta
- University of Burdwan

== Accreditation ==
The College is recognized by the University Grants Commission (UGC). The college has been reaccredited by the National Assessment & Accreditation Council (NAAC) with 'A Level' certification in December 2016.

== See also ==
- List of institutions of higher education in West Bengal
- Education in India
- Education in West Bengal
