= St. Xavier's College, Asansol =

College in West Bengal

- Type: Private
- Established: 2015
- Religious affiliation: Jesuit
- Academic affiliations: Kazi Nazrul University
- Principal: K. K. Devasy SJ
- Location: GT Rd, Chelidanga, Asansol, West Bengal, 713301, India; 23°41′23″N 86°57′43″E
- Campus: Urban, 4.5 acres
- Website: www.sxcasansol.in

St. Xavier's College, Asansol, is a general degree college in Asansol, Paschim Bardhaman District, West Bengal, India. It is a minority Institution managed by the Society of Jesus with the registration of St. Xavier's College Education Trust, Asansol. It offers undergraduate courses in arts, commerce and sciences. It had been affiliated to Kazi Nazrul University, Asansol.

== See also ==
- List of institutions of higher education in West Bengal
- Education in India
- Education in West Bengal
- List of Jesuit sites
