= Triveni Devi Bhalotia College =

College in West Bengal

Trivenidevi Bhalotia College
- Other name: Raniganj TDB College
- Type: Undergraduate & Postgraduate college
- Established: 1957; 69 years ago
- Accreditation: NAAC
- Academic affiliations: Kazi Nazrul University
- Principal: Dr. Sanjeev Pandey (Teacher-in-Charge)
- Academic staff: More than 150
- Students: More than 5000
- Location: College Para Road, Raniganj, Asansol, West Bengal, 713347, India; 23.6168922°N 87.1181173°E
- Campus: Urban
- Website: Triveni Devi Bhalotia College
- Location within West Bengal Location within India

Trivenidevi Bhalotia College, also known as Raniganj TDB College, is a co-educational institution and has the morning and day sections, established in 1957, at Raniganj, in Asansol, Paschim Bardhaman district, West Bengal, India. It is situated in a central location of Raniganj between NH-2 and Eastern Railway. It offers undergraduate courses in arts, commerce and sciences and post graduate courses. It is the second biggest college in West Bengal with respect to higher education with 37 honours subjects and 7 postgraduate subjects. In 2007, the college celebrated its Golden Jubilee.

== Affiliation and accreditation ==
Triveni Devi Bhalotia College (TDB College) initiated its journey from 1957 as an affiliated college under the University of Calcutta. From 1960, it is affiliated to The University of Burdwan and from 24 June 2015, it is affiliated to Kazi Nazrul University, Asansol. It is recognized by the University Grants Commission (UGC).

== Alumni association ==
The college has an alumni association named TDB College Alumni Association (TDBCAA). TDBCAA was established on 7 July 2007 with an aim to create opportunities to create and maintain contacts with the alumnus. Among other activities of TDBCAA, it provides scholarship to the needy students and grants Certificate of Merit to the top three positions of college in University of Burdwan.

== Campus ==
The college campus consists of college building, central library, residential staff quarters, boys' hostels and three playgrounds which cover an area of 15 acres (approximate). Among which the main college campus along with the branch of a Syndicate Bank covers the 40 percent and 20 percent land is used for garden and plants.

== Career guidance cell ==
The career Guidance Cell at TDB college functions under the direct control and direction of the principal of the college.

The activities of the cell include collecting the database of the students and compiling them for use, when needed. The cell guides the students and improves their skill to face various competitive exams and interviews. The career guidance cell organizes seminars and meetings to encourage the students to plan their future. The cell invites reputed companies to the campus to conduct campus interview and find suitable jobs for the skill available among the students. Conduct campus interview and find suitable to be further. The cell also facilitates the economically weaker sections of the students of first- and second-year undergraduate courses to find suitable part-time jobs to supplement the family income without affecting the academic pursuit.

== Departments and courses ==
The college offers different undergraduate and postgraduate courses and aims at imparting education to the undergraduates of lower- and middle-class people of Raniganj and its adjoining areas.

=== Arts and commerce ===
Arts and Commerce faculty consists of departments of Bengali, English, Sanskrit, Hindi, Urdu, Santali, History, Geography, Political Science, Philosophy, Education, Music, Multimedia and Mass Communication, Physical Education, Sociology, Finance & Accountancy, and Business Administration.

=== Science ===
Science faculty consists of the departments of Chemistry, Physics, Mathematics, Statistics, Computer Science & Application, Biochemistry, Environmental Science, Botany, Zoology, Physiology, Nutrition, Geology, Psychology, Electronics, and Economics.

== Hostel ==
The boys' hostel building is constructed at the northeastern corner of the college campus accommodating 100 boys.

== Library ==
The college owes a separate central Library Building designed to cater to the college's current and future teaching and research interests.

== Open-air theatre ==
The open-air theatre – "Binoy Chowdhury Mancha" – is meant for organizing cultural programs, annual functions, reunions of Departments and other programs; in which group gathering may be required. The open-air theatre has the capacity to accommodate around 2000 spectators comfortably at a time.

== Other facilities ==
- National Cadet Corps (NCC)
- National Service Scheme (NSS)
- Govt. Scholarship for SC/ST Students
- Students' Aid Fund
- Free Studentship
- Students' Union
- Annual Sports
- NTA-UGC NET/ SET Coaching Centre
- Psychological Counselling Cell
- E-Learning Portal
- Grievance and Redressal Cell (for COVID-19)

== See also ==
- List of institutions of higher education in West Bengal
- Education in India
- Education in West Bengal
