= Sacred Heart Church, Asansol =

Church in West Bengal

Coordinates: 23.6876°N 86.9712°E

Sacred Heart Church is a heritage Christian church situated in Asansol, Paschim Bardhaman district, in the Indian state of West Bengal. It is the oldest church building of Asansol.

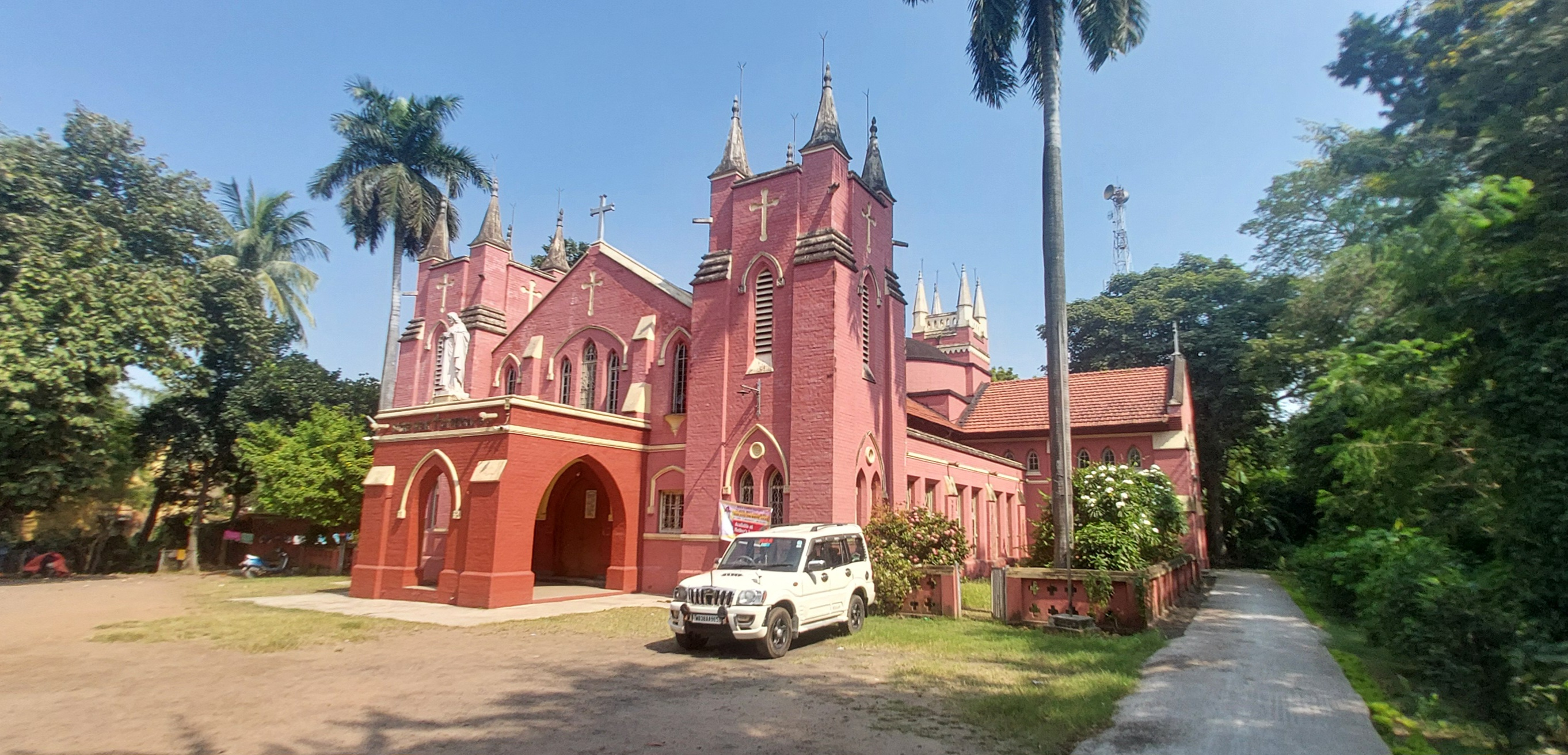
Sacred Heart Church campus in Asansol

== History ==
Large number of Europeans settled in the town as British investment in the Eastern Bengal Railway and Industry grows in Asansol-Raniganj area and it became an important zone for social and religious work by various Christian missionaries. In 1873, Fr. Jaques, S. J. from the Bengal Jesuit Mission of Calcutta, came to Asansol and acquired land near the G.T Road. The church was finally built in 1875 by the East Indian Railway Company. The new building was founded in 1927.

== Gallery ==
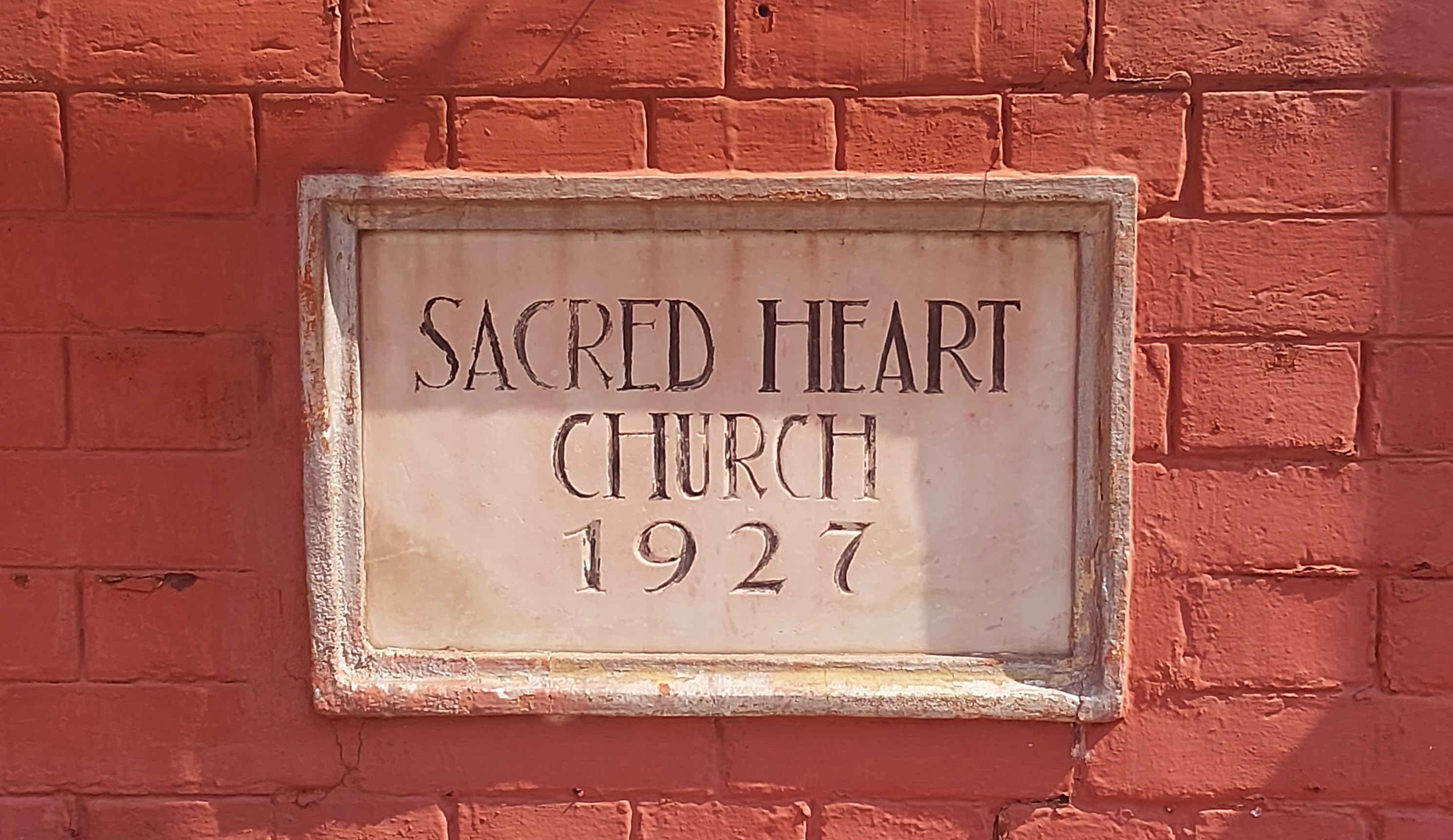

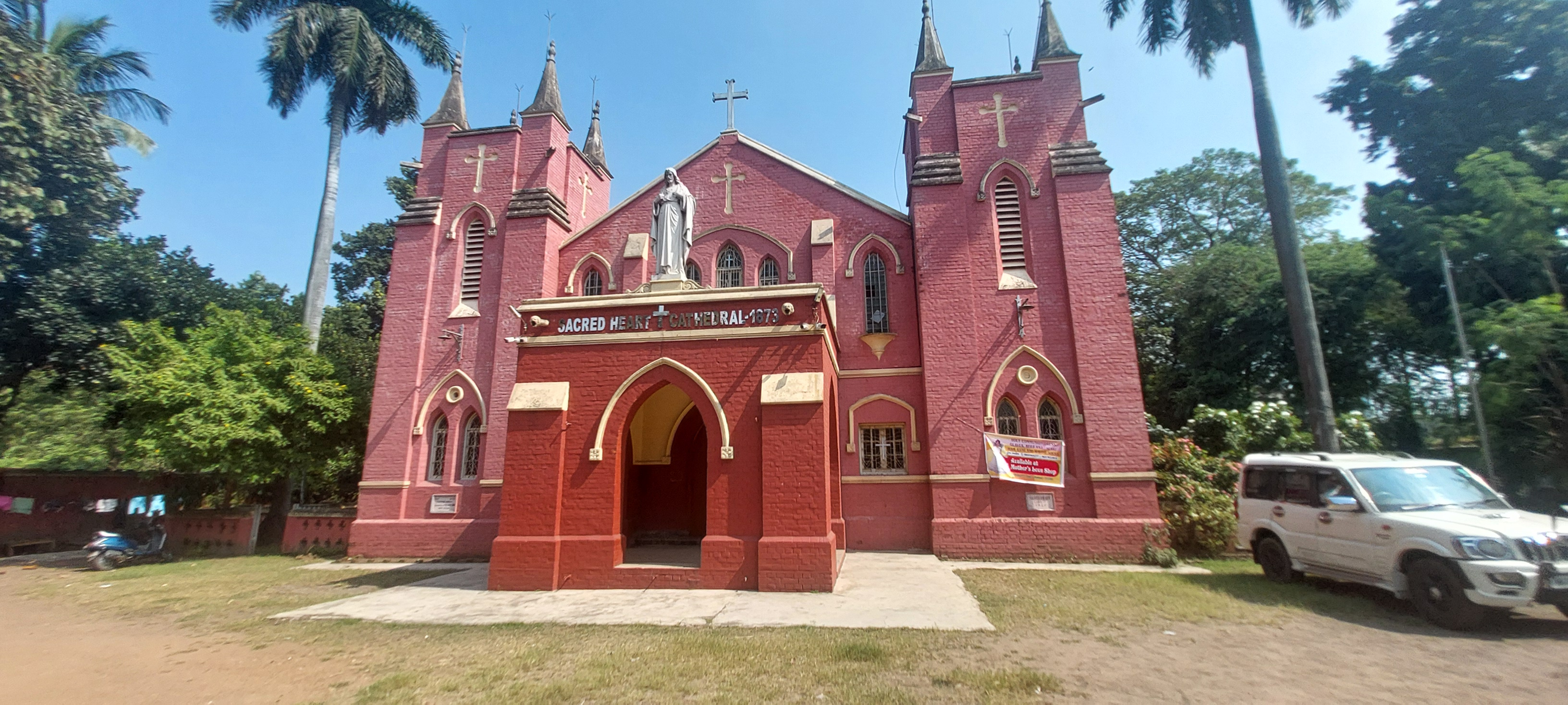

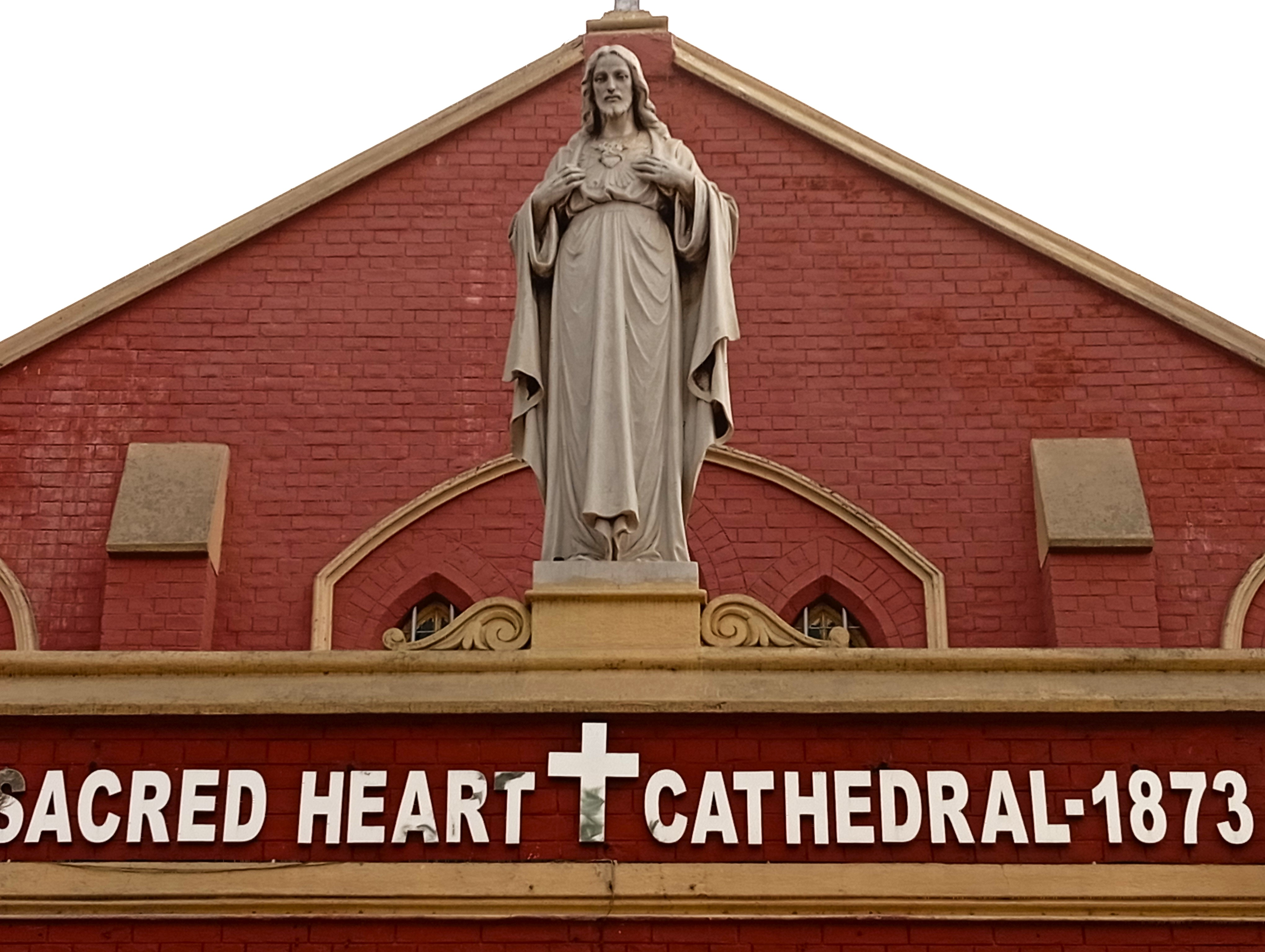

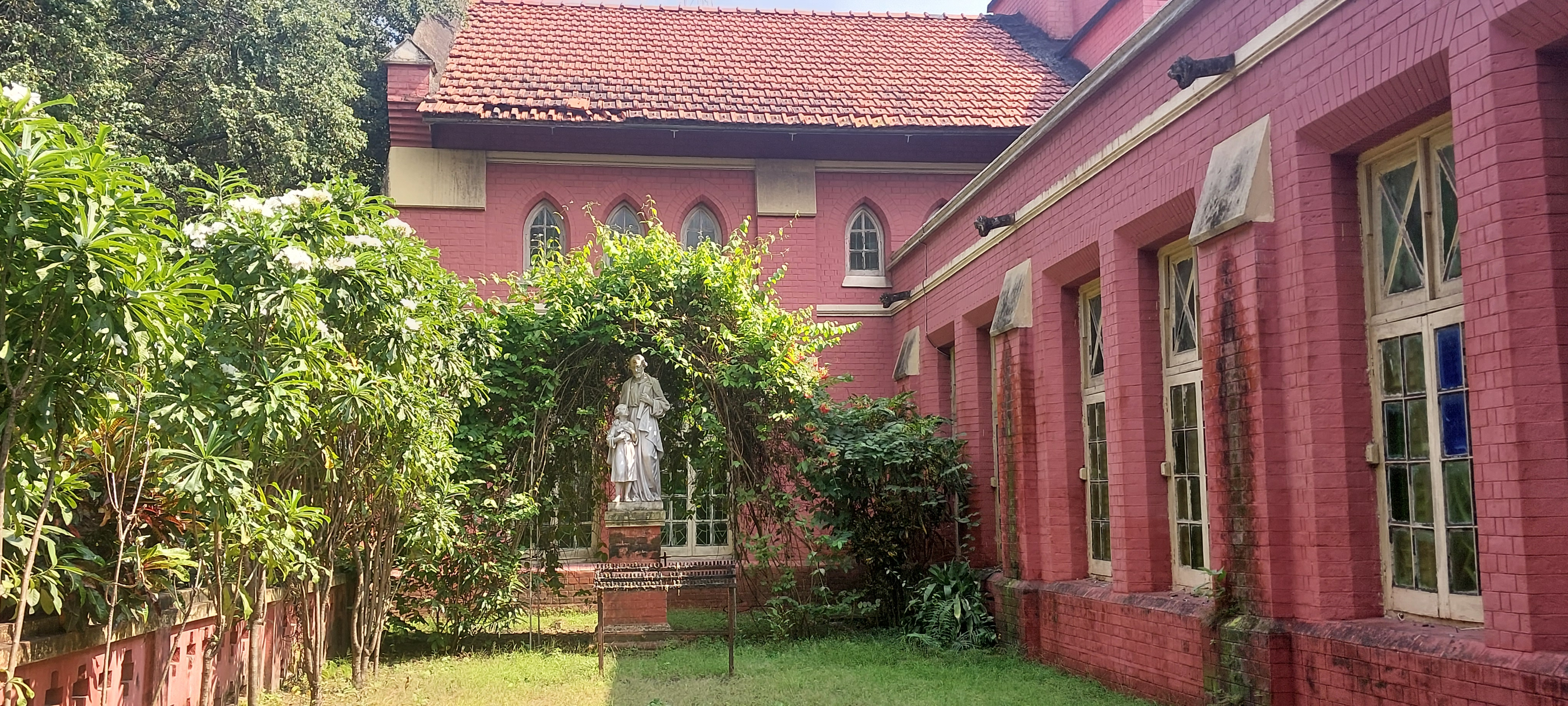
