= Burnpur Cricket Club Ground =

Multi purpose stadium in Asansol, West Bengal, India

- Burnpur Cricket Club
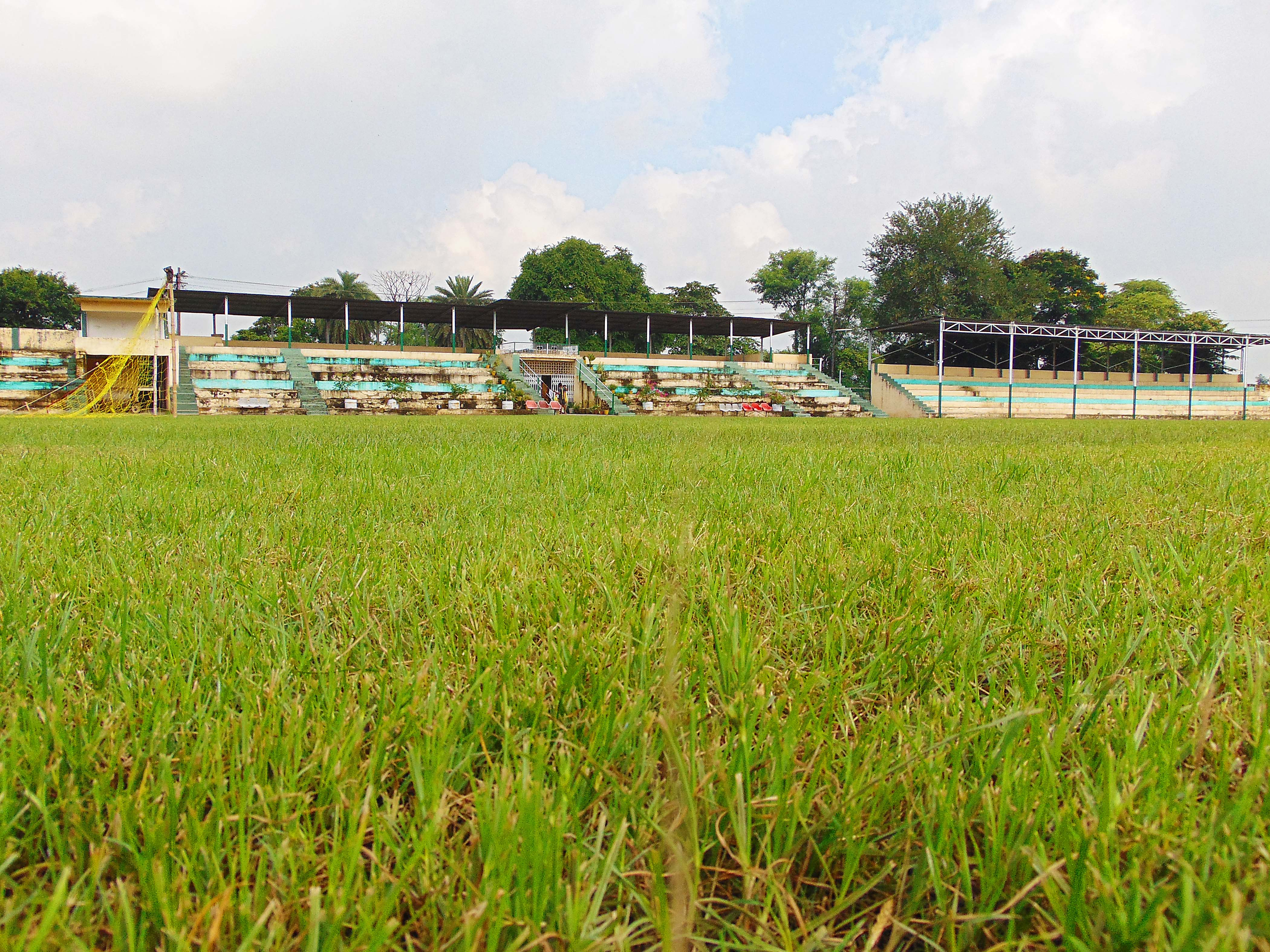
- Full name: Burnpur Cricket Club Ground
- Location: Burnpur, Asansol, West Bengal
- Owner: Burnpur Cricket Club
- Operator: Burnpur Cricket Club
- Capacity: 5,000

Construction
- Groundbreaking: 1994
- Opened: 2004

Website
- ESPNcricinfo

Burnpur Cricket Club Ground is a multi purpose stadium in Asansol, West Bengal. The ground is mainly used for organizing matches of football, cricket and other sports.

== Notable matches ==
Many First-class and List A matches were played on Burnpur Cricket Club Ground, Burnpur:

- 23 October 1994 Deodhar Trophy 1994/95 Central Zone cricket team v West Zone cricket team
- 25 October 1994 Duleep Trophy 1994/95 Central Zone cricket team v West Zone cricket team

Since then the ground has been used for other matches until 2004.
