= St. Vincent's High and Technical School =

St. Vincent's High and Technical School, Asansol
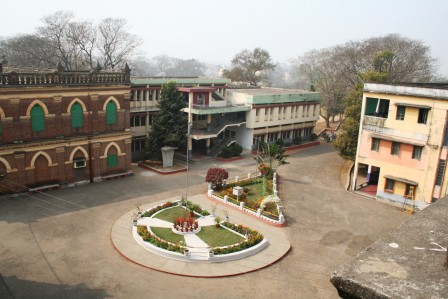

Location
- Asansol, West Bengal, India
- Coordinates: 23.6809844°N 86.9547514°E

Information
- Type: Private
- Motto: CONSILIO ET ANIMO (Consider wisely and act with courage)
- Established: 1895
- School district: Paschim Bardhaman
- Principal: Ravi Victor
- Faculty: 60
- Grades: KG-12
- Enrollment: 1,800+
- Houses: Blue House (St. Matthew's); Yellow House (St. John's); Green House (St. Luke's); Red House (St. Mark's)
- Colors: Navy blue and gold
- Athletics: Football, cricket, Basketball, swimming, field hockey, badminton, Table Tennis
- Affiliation: Indian Certificate of Secondary Education Examination (ICSE) and The Indian School Certificate Examination (ISC)
- School site: stvincentsschoolasansol.in

St. Vincent's High and Technical School (known as SVS) is one of the oldest schools in eastern India. It is a kindergarten through 12th grade school of secondary education, in Asansol, India, in the western part of West Bengal, about 200 km from Kolkata.

== History ==
In 1895 the high school was sponsored by the Congregation of Christian Brothers, a Catholic missionary society from Ireland. St. Vincent's High and Technical School is one of the 19 Christian Brothers schools in India.

In 1914, when the Calcutta Improvement Trust was formed to open up the congested parts of the city. This would leave the Moorghihatta Orphanage without a playground and kitchen. On a visit to St. Patrick's Higher Secondary School, Br. Arsenius Ryan, the provincial of the Brothers, inspected an adjacent partly-cultivated plot of 50 bighas as a possible site for the orphanage. The site was purchased and, with the addition of surrounding plots, it increased to 390 bighas, the property on which St. Vincent's now stands. Br Joseph Moyes was selected to superintend the building.

The foundation stone of St. Vincent's School was laid by Dr. Meulman S.J., Archbishop of Calcutta, on 25 October 1919. In 1927 Br. Gabriel Pakenham was appointed superior and the first batch of 29 boys took up residence. They were soon joined by 20 more. Official government sanction was granted at the end of the year. To meet strict government stipulations, students were presented for the matriculation of Calcutta University.

Br. Baptist Collins, who succeeded Br. Packenham, used part of the extensive property for dairy farming. Br. Aidan Callaghan followed Br. Collins in 1934. Affiliation to the University of Calcutta was made permanent in 1937. From 1938, boys were able to sit for the Board of Apprenticeship Training examination.

In 1942, during World War II, the British military took over the school and 350 troops from the Royal Air Force occupied the buildings, except the Chapel. Many of the boys went to St. Michael's Kurji and were schooled there as a unit by the education department, under the title of "St Vincent's School, Asansol, now at Kurji".

In February 1946 Br. Adjutor O'Connor returned as superior, taking back the property from the military. On 1 March 1947 the school reopened. Rs. 21,117 was received from the military as rental and compensation for damage to buildings and grounds.

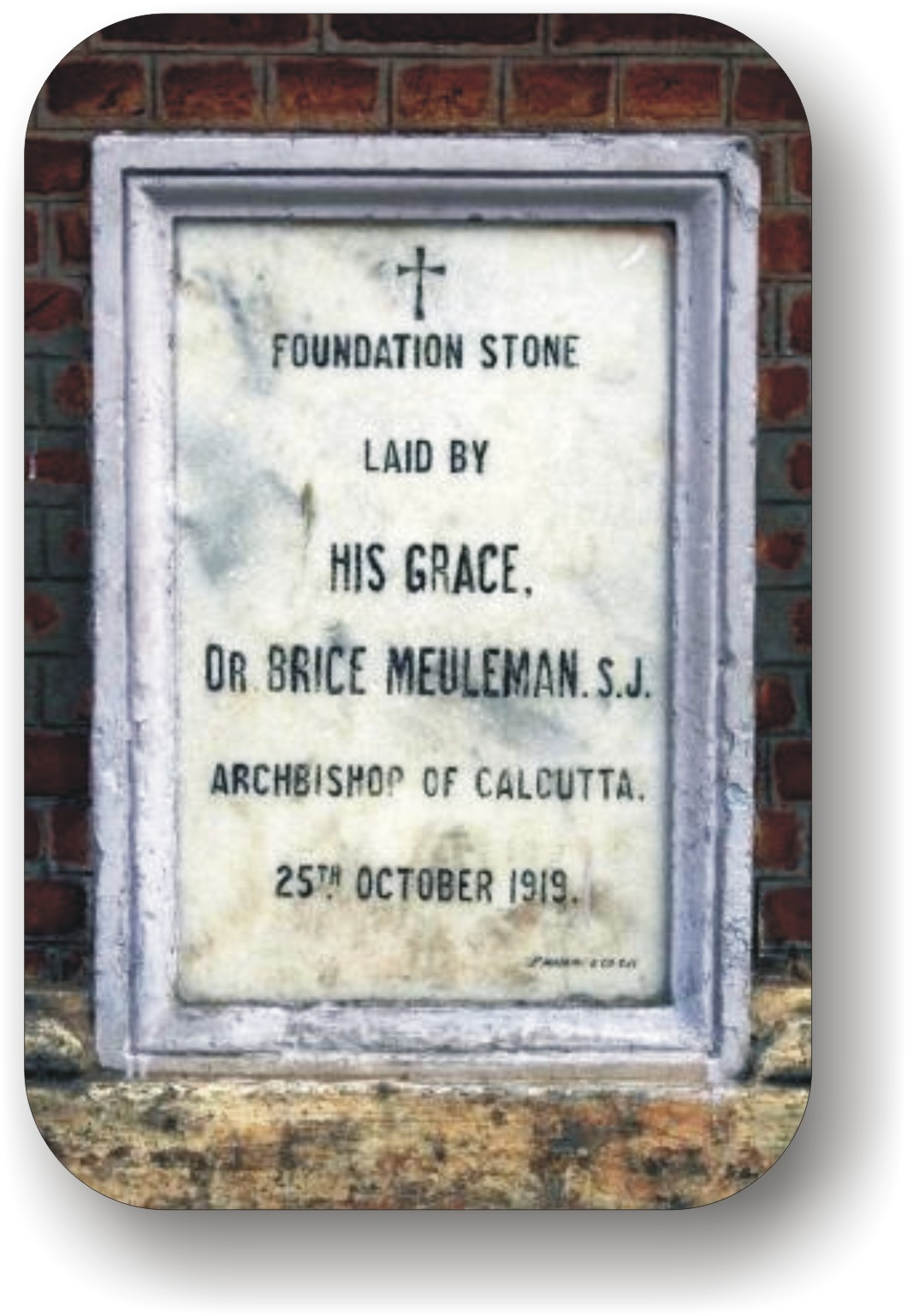
The foundation stone of St. Vincent's School, laid by Dr. Meulman S.J., Archbishop of Calcutta, on 25 October 1919

In 1949 it became a technical school, with a building constructed and equipped for the purpose. The provincial of the Christian Brothers in Australia sent a Br Raphael Maher, who was a qualified technical instructor. He returned to Australia in early 1955, and was replaced by Br. C.J. Harrison, Br. R.C. Whiting and Br. R.A. Parton, also from Australia.

St. Vincent's was a boarding school until the early 1990s. It is currently a day school with around 1850 students.

The senior secondary admitted girls from 2009. Apart from the Industrial Training Centre, St. Vincent's also runs an NIOS (Class X & XII) Centre for over 1500 students.

=== List of Principals ===
Principal	Tenure
Br. Joseph Moyes, CFC	1919–1927
Br. Gabriel Pakenham, CFC	1927–?
Br. Baptist Collins, CFC	?–1934
Br. Aidan Callaghan, CFC	1934–1939
Government occupation	1939–1946
Br. Adjutor O'Connor, CFC	1946–?
Br. J.E. McCann, CFC	?
Br. Raphael Maher, CFC	?–1955
Br. Hayes CFC	1958-1963
Br. W. P. MULCAHY, CFC	1964- 1966
Br R.C. Whiting, CFC	1967-1969
Br. O'Donoghue, CFC	1970-1975?
Br.J.N.Fouley	1980-1986
Br. Kayle, CFC,	1989-1993
Br. Christopher, CFC,	1994-1996
Ravi Victor,	2010–present

== See also ==
- Education in India
- List of schools in India
- Education in West Bengal
