= Eastern Railway Divisional Stadium =

Multi purpose stadium in Asansol, West Bengal

- Loco Stadium
- Full name: Eastern Railway Divisional Stadium
- Location: Asansol, West Bengal
- Owner: Eastern Railway
- Operator: Eastern Railway
- Capacity: 5,000

Construction
- Groundbreaking: 1982
- Opened: 1982

Website
- ESPNcricinfo

Eastern Railway Divisional Stadium or Loco Ground is a multi purpose stadium in Asansol, West Bengal. The ground is mainly used for organizing matches of football, cricket and other sports. The stadium has hosted a Ranji Trophy match in 1982 when Bengal cricket team played against Orissa cricket team but since then the stadium has hosted non-first-class matches.
