= Burnpur Airport =

Airport of West Bengal, India

Asansol (Burnpur) Airport IISCO Airport
- IATA: none; ICAO: VEBB

Summary
- Airport type: Private
- Owner: IISCO Steel Plant of Steel Authority of India
- Operator: Airports Authority of India
- Serves: Asansol
- Location: Burnpur, Asansol, West Bengal, India
- Elevation AMSL: 310 ft (94 m)
- Coordinates: 23°37′53″N 86°58′31″E

Map
- Location in West Bengal Burnpur Airport (India)

Runways
Direction	Length		Surface
Direction	ft	m	Surface
09/27	4,003	1,220	Asphalt
- Operational private airport

Asansol (Burnpur) Airport (ICAO: VEBB) is located at Burnpur in the southern part of the city of Asansol, India. It is a private airport owned by IISCO Steel Plant of Steel Authority of India and can handle small aircraft.

== Facilities ==
The airport is located at an elevation of 310 feet (94 m) above mean sea level. It has one runway designated 09/27 with an asphalt surface measuring 4,003 by 75 feet (1,220 × 23 m) with non-precision approach markings.

== Airlines and destinations ==
No airline currently operates from this airport.

== See also ==
- List of Airports by ICAO code
- List of Airports in India
