= Asansol =

Industrial city in West Bengal, India

- Metropolis
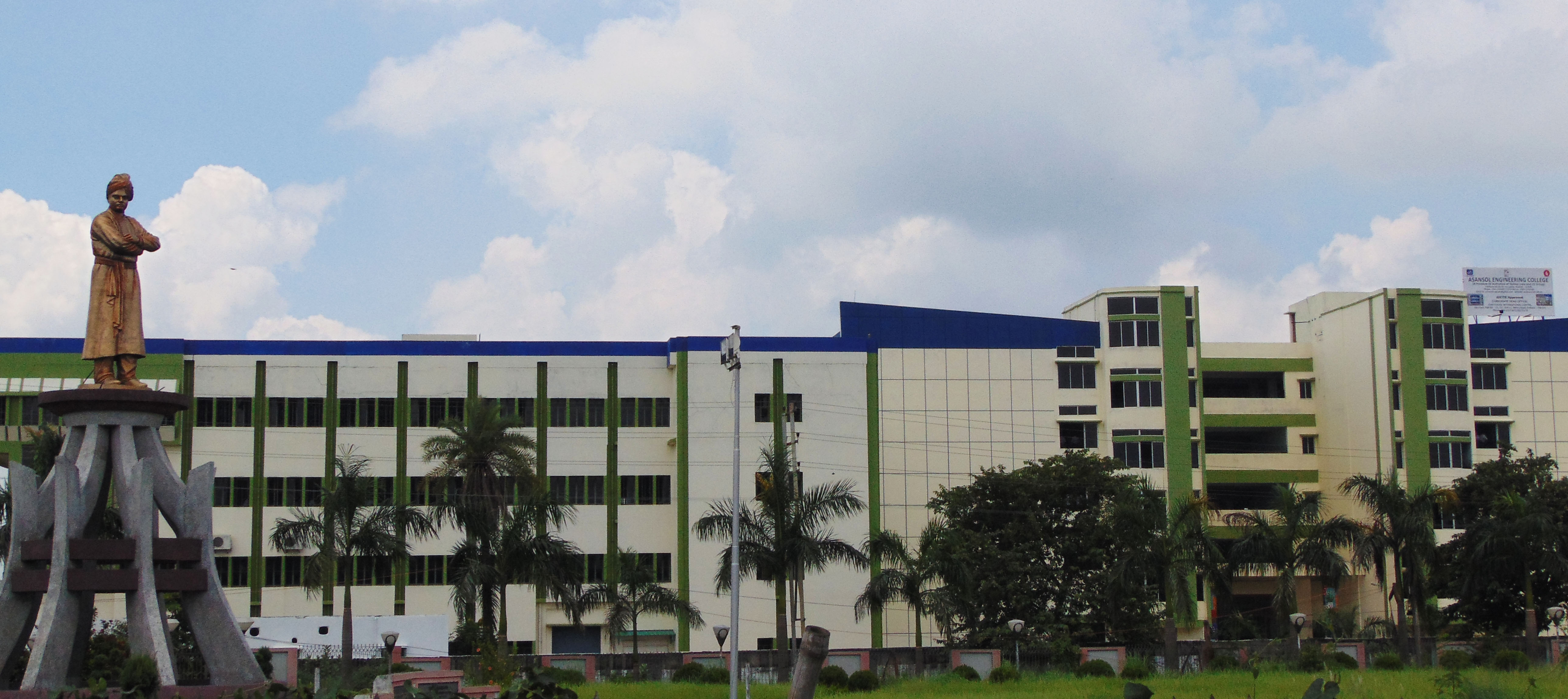
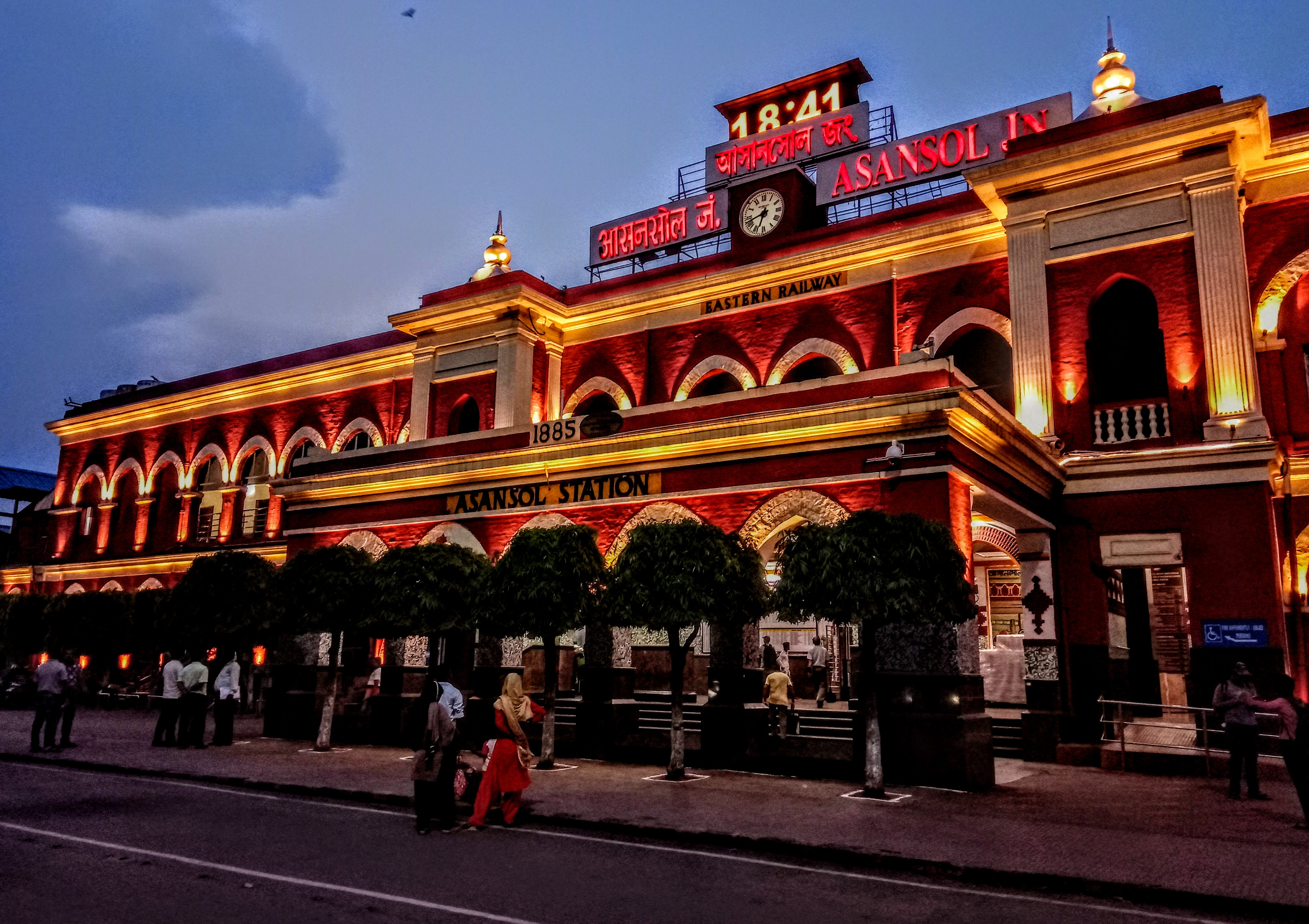
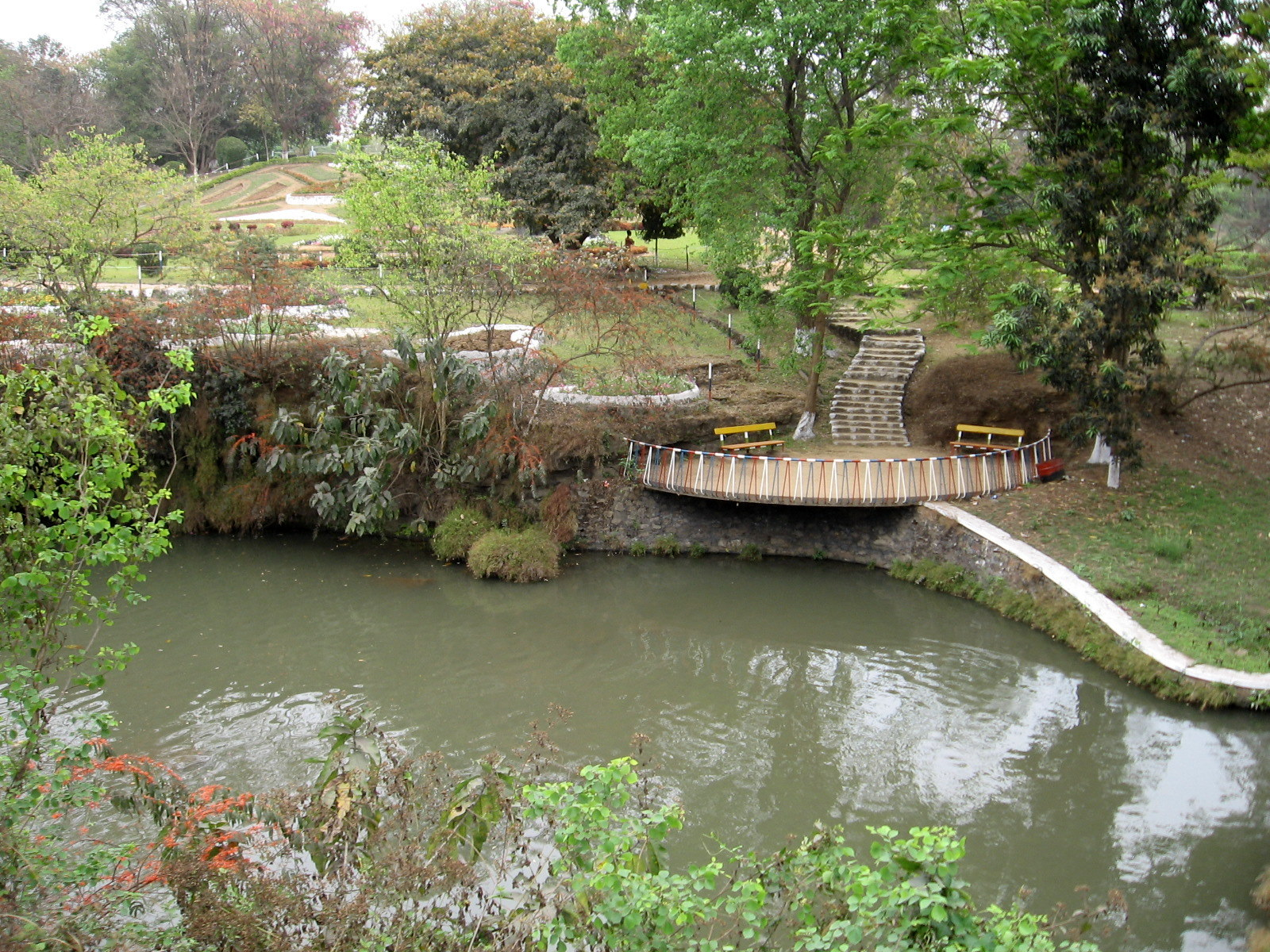
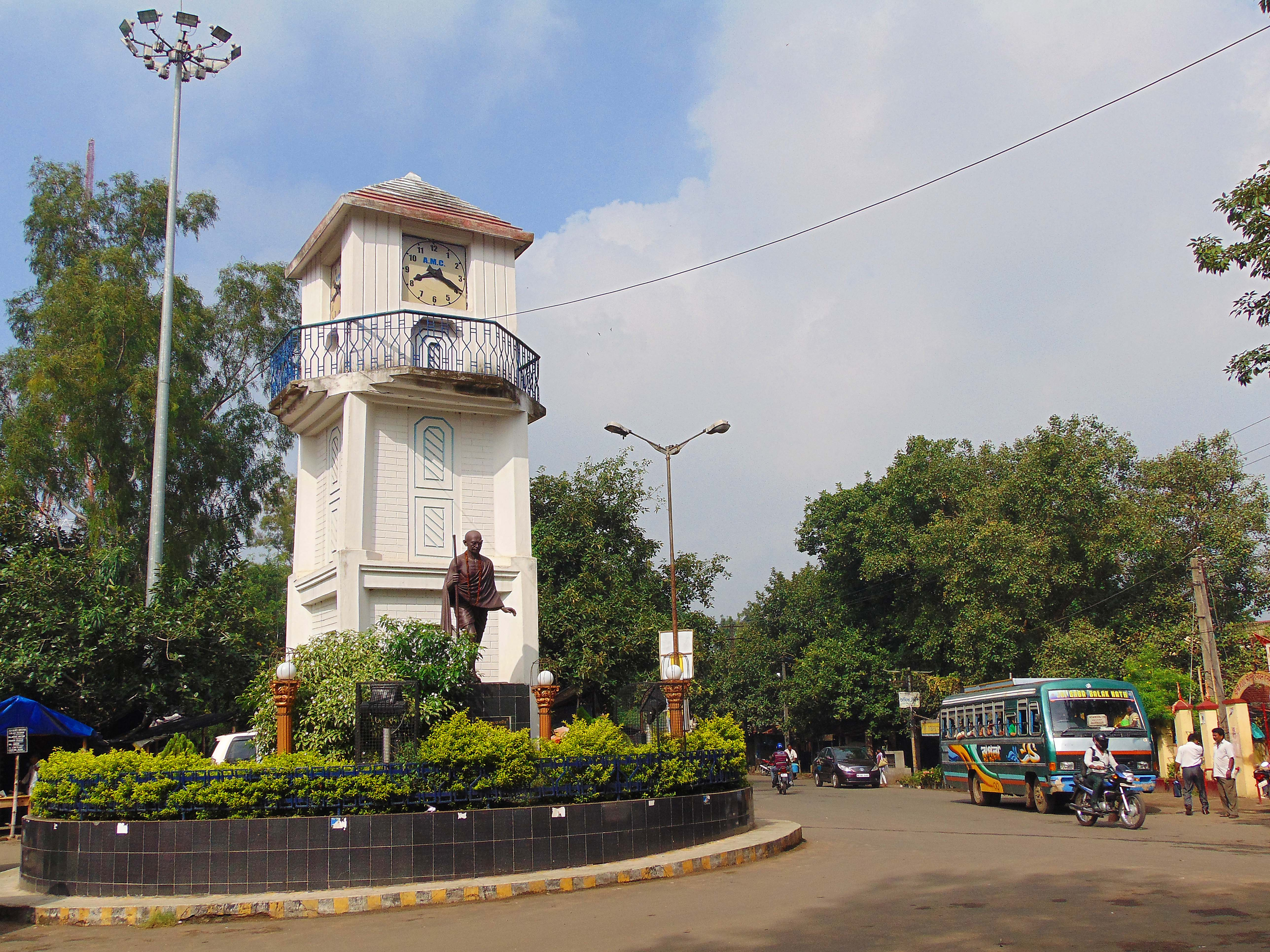
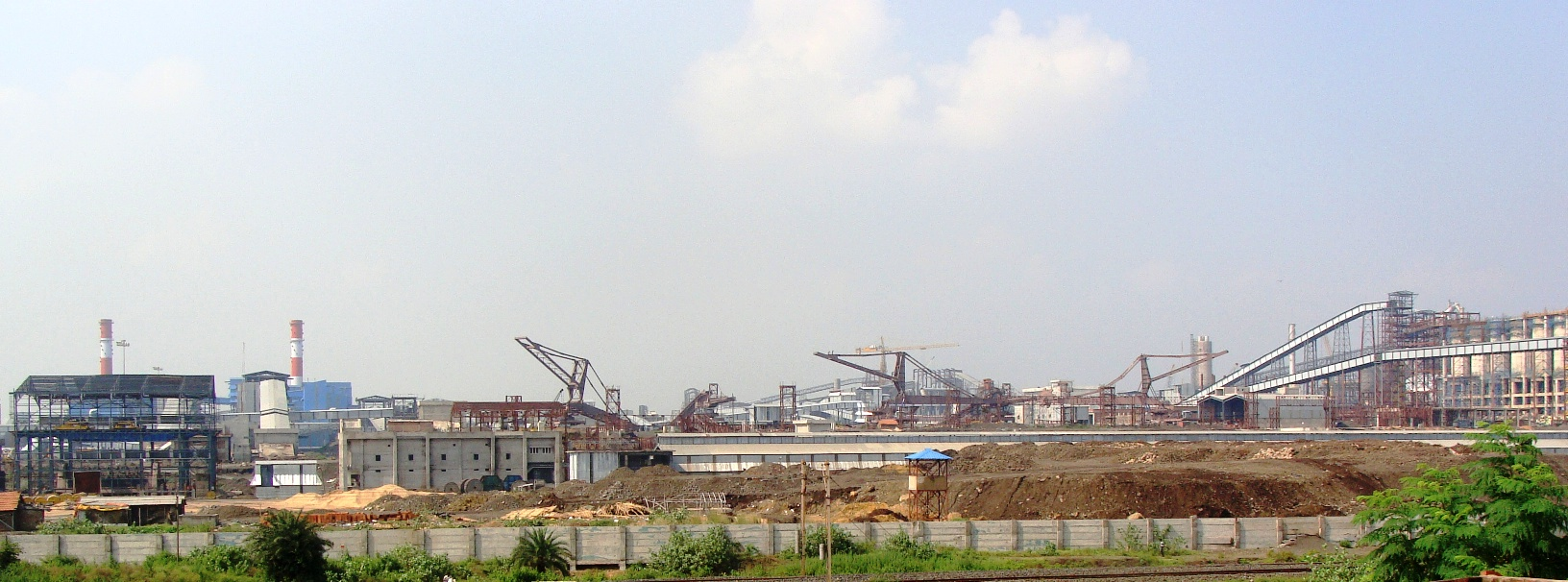
- Asansol Junction railway station, IISCO Steel Plant, Asansol Engineering College, Burnpur Nehru Park, Gandhi More street
- Nicknames: "The City of Brotherhood" and "The Land of Black Diamonds"
- Location in West Bengal, India Asansol (India) Asansol (Asia)
- Coordinates: 23.68°N 86.99°E
- Country: India
- State: West Bengal
- District: Paschim Bardhaman
- Established: 1885

Government
  - Type: Municipal Corporation
  - Body: Asansol Municipal Corporation
  - Mayor: Vacant
  - Deputy mayor: Vacant
  - Police commissioner: Pranav Kumar

Area
  - Metropolis: 326 km^{2} (126 sq mi)
  - Metro: 1,615 km^{2} (624 sq mi)
  - Rank: 2nd in West Bengal
- Elevation: 111 m (364 ft)

Population (2011)
  - Metropolis: 1,243,414
  - Rank: 2nd in West Bengal
  - Density: 3,810/km^{2} (9,880/sq mi)
- Demonym: Asansolians / Asansolites/ Asansolvasi

Languages
  - Official: Bengali
  - Additional official: English
- Time zone: UTC+5:30 (IST)
- PIN: 713 3xx
- Telephone code: 0341
- Vehicle registration: WB 37 / WB 38 / WB 44 (WB 44A, WB 44B, WB 44C, WB 44D)
- Sex ratio: 1.08 ♂/♀
- Literacy: 84.82
- Lok Sabha constituency: Asansol (MP — Shatrughan Sinha — TMC)
- Vidhan Sabha constituencies: Asansol Uttar (MLA — Krishnendu Mukherjee —BJP) Asansol Dakshin (MLA —Agnimitra Paul —BJP) Pandaveswar (MLA — Jitendra Tiwari —BJP) Raniganj (MLA — Partha Ghosh (politician) —BJP) Jamuria (MLA — Bijan Mukherjee —BJP) Kulti (MLA —Ajay Kumar Poddar —BJP) Barabani (MLA —Arijit Roy —BJP)
- Police: Asansol-Durgapur Police Commissionerate
- Website: paschimbardhaman.gov.in

Asansol is a city in the Indian state of West Bengal. It is the second largest city in West Bengal. It is the 33rd largest urban agglomeration in India by population. Asansol is the district headquarters of Paschim Bardhaman district. According to a 2010 report released by the International Institute for Environment and Development, a UK-based policy research non-governmental body, Asansol was ranked 11th among Indian cities and 42nd in the world in its list of 100 fastest-growing cities. Asansol is classed as a Y-category city for calculation of HRA (House Rent Allowance) for public servants (rate 16%) making it a "Tier-II" city.

== Etymology ==
"Asan", a species of tree which generally grows thirty meters tall, is found on the banks of the Damodar River; "sol" refers to land. The name "Asansol" is a combination of these two words. Asansol is a city on the banks of Damodar and its land is rich in minerals.

Historically the city was anglicised as Assensole during the British era but the name was reverted after Independence.

== History ==
The region is believed to have been a part of the kingdom of Vishnupur where the Malla dynasty ruled for approximately a thousand years till the emergence of the British. This theory is backed by the presence of Vishnupur style temple present at Chhotodighari village and Domohani village in Asansol.

== Geography ==
Cities, towns and ECL Areas in the western portion of Asansol Sadar subdivision in Paschim Bardhaman district
MC: municipal corporation, P: rural administrative centre, CT: census town, N: neighbourhood, OG: out growth, T: temple
Owing to space constraints in the small map, the actual locations in a larger map may vary slightly

=== Overview ===
Asansol is a cosmopolitan city located on the lower Chota Nagpur Plateau, which occupies most of Jharkhand, between the Damodar and Ajay rivers. Another river, the Barakar, joins the Damodar near Dishergarh. Two small rivulets, Nunia and Garui flow past Asansol.

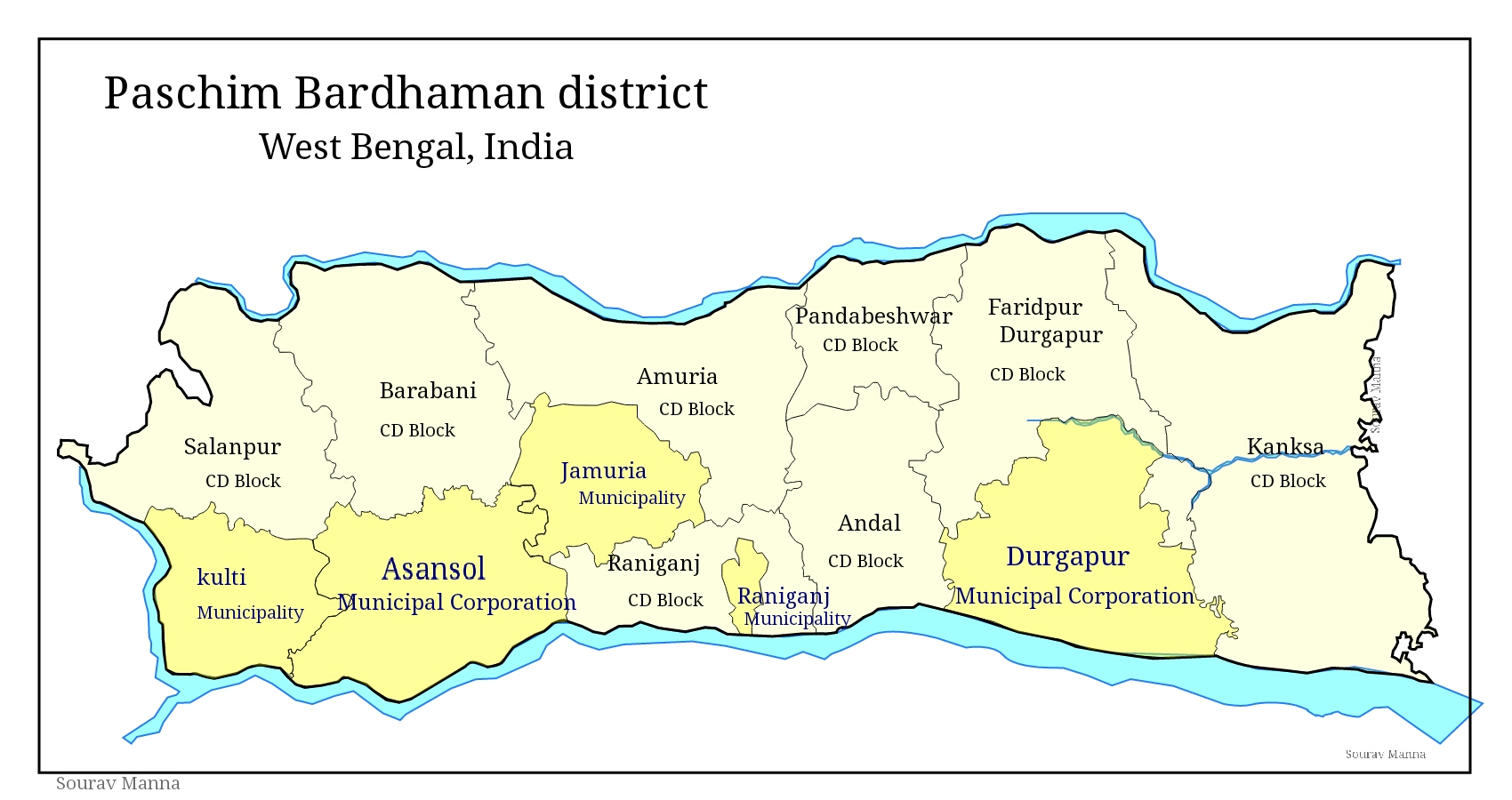
Map of Paschim Bardhaman district

While Dhanbad district in Jharkhand lies on the western side, Durgapur subdivision lies on the eastern side. To the south, across the Damodar river are the Purulia and Bankura districts. To the north are Dumka and Birbhum districts. Dhanbad district is a major coal mining area and has close links with Asansol; both lie in the Damodar valley.

The city is connected by the Grand Trunk Road and by rail with Durgapur, Burdwan, and Kolkata. It is an important coal-trading and railway centre, with large railway workshops and a railway colony.

=== Climate ===
Asansol has sweltering summers and warm to cool winters. In summer, temperatures can soar above 45 °C or 113 °F with dry hot winds known as 'loo' blowing, while in winter, temperatures go below 10 °C or 50 °F. Monsoon lasts from June to September and sometimes into October. The Köppen sub-type for this climate is Aw (tropical savanna climate).

Climate data for Asansol, India
Month	Jan	Feb	Mar	Apr	May	Jun	Jul	Aug	Sep	Oct	Nov	Dec	Year
Mean daily maximum °C (°F)	26 (78)	28 (82)	34 (94)	44 (111)	45 (113)	43 (110)	32 (90)	32 (89)	32 (90)	32 (89)	29 (84)	26 (79)	32 (90)
Mean daily minimum °C (°F)	12 (53)	14 (57)	19 (66)	23 (74)	26 (78)	26 (79)	26 (78)	26 (78)	25 (77)	22 (71)	16 (60)	12 (53)	21 (69)
Average rainfall mm (inches)	18 (0.7)	33 (1.3)	20 (0.8)	20 (0.8)	74 (2.9)	240 (9.5)	350 (13.7)	340 (13.3)	210 (8.3)	110 (4.3)	15 (0.6)	5.1 (0.2)	1,430 (56.3)
Source: Weatherbase

Asansol has been ranked 16th best "National Clean Air City" (under Category 1 >10L Population cities) in India according to 'Swachh Vayu Survekshan 2024 Results'

== Demographics ==
Historical population
Year	Pop.	±%
1951	185,000	—
1961	289,000	+56.2%
1971	376,000	+30.1%
1981	637,000	+69.4%
1991	942,000	+47.9%
2001	1,073,000	+13.9%
2011	1,243,414	+15.9%

As per the 2011 census, the Asansol municipal area has a total population of 563,917, and the total population of Asansol UA is 1,243,414 out of which 646,052 are males and 597,362 are females. The city has a literacy rate of 83.30%.

=== Religion ===
Religion in Asansol as of 2011.
1. Hinduism (75.2%)
2. Islam (21.3%)
3. Sikhism (1.09%)
4. Christianity (0.99%)
5. Others (1.04%)
6. Not stated (0.43%)

The major religions in Asansol are Hinduism, followed by 75.18% of the population, and Islam, followed by 21.26% of the population. 1.09% of the populace are adherents of Sikhism, while 0.99% of the population adheres to Christianity.

=== Languages ===
Languages spoken in Asansol (2011)
1. Bengali (43.1%)
2. Hindi (31.7%)
3. Urdu (19.4%)
4. Santali (2.90%)
5. Punjabi (1.20%)
6. Others (1.70%)

Bengali is spoken by the majority (43.1%), followed by Hindi (31.7%), Urdu (19.4%), Santali (2.9%), and Punjabi (1.2%).

== Government and politics ==
=== Administration ===
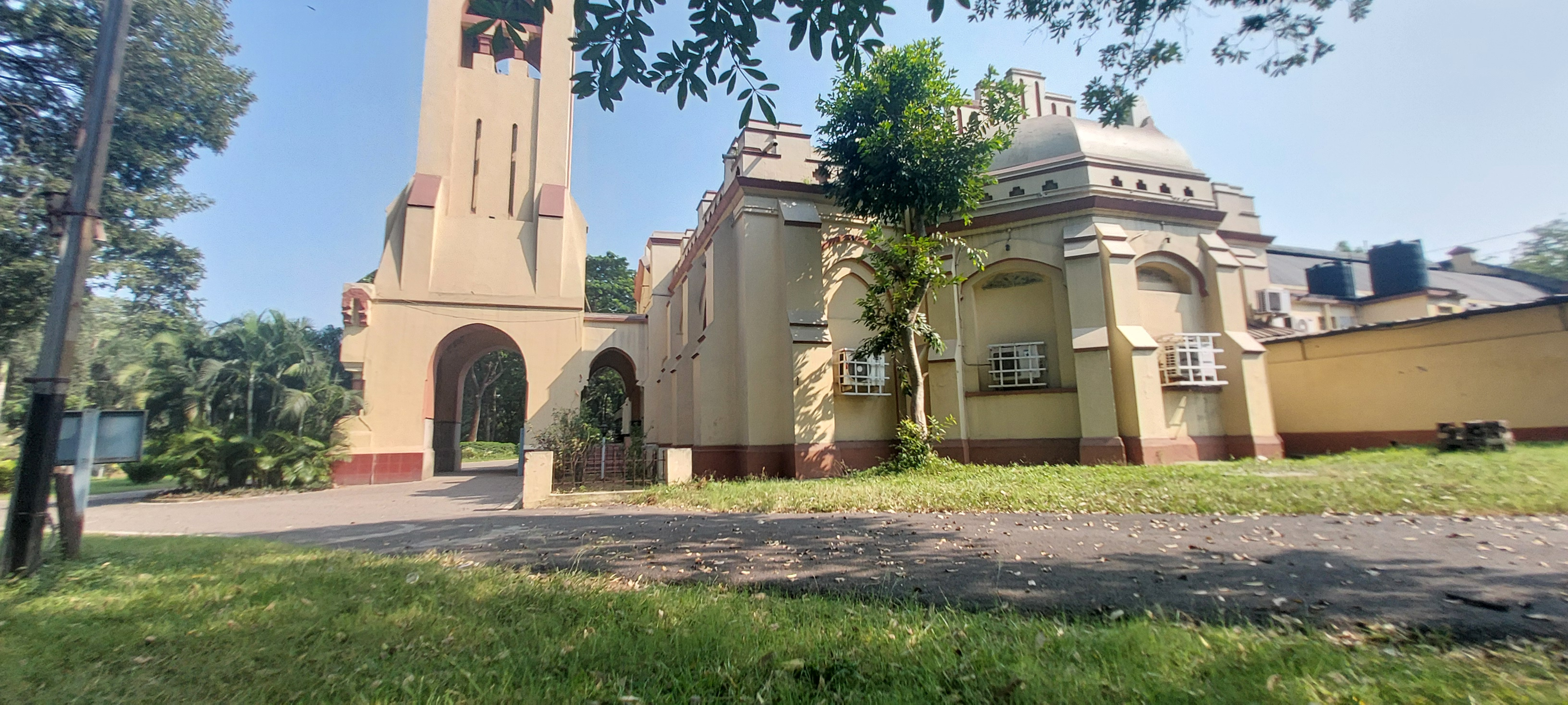
Heritage Durand Institute in Asansol

Asansol is administered by the Asansol Municipal Corporation. In 1850, a union committee was formed to look after the civic needs of Asansol. The Assensole (now Asansol) Municipality was approved in 1885 but started functioning effectively in 1896. It was upgraded to the status of a corporation in 1994. Since 2011 it has had its own Police Commissionerate. In 2015, Kulti, Jamuria and Raniganj Municipalities were dissolved and now these areas are administered by the Asansol Municipal Corporation. Thus the proper city limits of Asansol includes the old Asansol Area, including Burnpur, as well as other prominent locations like Raniganj, Chinakuri, Mithani, Barakar, Kulti, Dishergarh, Neamatpur, Sitarampur and Jamuria. Asansol Municipal Corporation has 106 wards.

Asansol-Durgapur Development Authority (ADDA) was established in April 1980 by the merger of the Asansol Planning Organisation and the Durgapur Development Authority. Jurisdiction of ADDA covers the areas administered by Asansol Municipal Corporation, the Jamuria Panchayet Samiti, the Community Development Blocks of Andal, Pandabeswar and Durgapur-Faridpur, Durgapur Municipal Corporation and a small part of Kanksa Community Development Block.

=== Municipal finance ===
According to financial data published on the CityFinance Portal of the Ministry of Housing and Urban Affairs, the Asansol Municipal Corporation reported total revenue receipts of ₹187 crore (US$22.5 million) and total expenditure of ₹236 crore (US$28.4 million) in 2022–23. Tax revenue accounted for about 16.6% of the total revenue, while the corporation received ₹129 crore in grants during the financial year.

=== Police stations ===
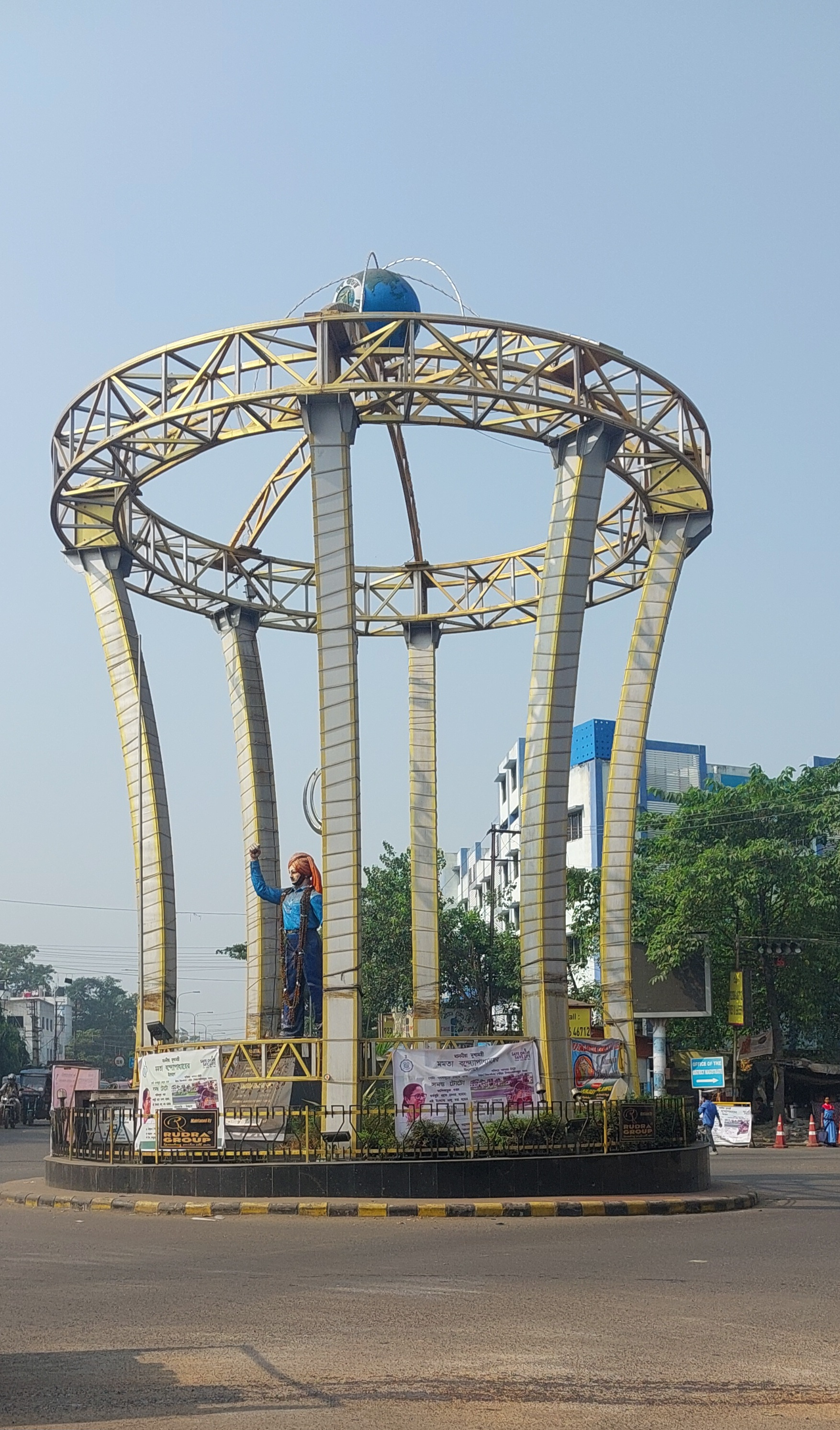
Bhagat Singh Chowk in Asansol

Asansol North police station has jurisdiction over Raniganj CD Block and parts of Asansol Municipal Corporation. The area covered is 50 km^{2} and the population covered is 410,000 (2001). It has police investigation centres at Kanyapur and Jahagirmohalla.

Asansol South police station has jurisdiction over parts of Asansol municipal corporation. The area covered is 69 km^{2} and the population covered is 475,439 (2001).

Asansol Women PS covers Asansol subdivision.

Raniganj PS has jurisdiction within the city and has the following centres under its area:

PP/IC	Address
Panjabi More Investigation Centre	Panjabi More
Ballavpur Police Post	Raghunathchak
Nimcha Investigation Centre	Jemari

Jamuria PS has jurisdiction over the following centres;

PP/IC	Address
Sripur Investigation Centre	Nigha, Bengala Occidental
Kendra Police Post	Kendra
Churulia Investigation Centre	Churulia

Hirapur and Kulti Police Stations also serve the following parts of Asansol municipal corporation area.

PP/IC/OP	Address
Neamatpur Investigation Centre	Neamatpur Fanri Rd, Neamatpur
Barakar Police Post	Station Rd, Barakar
Sanctoria Investigation Centre	Dishergarh
Chowrangi Outpost	Chittaranjan Rd

== Economy ==
The economy of Asansol is primarily dependent on its steel and coal industries, railways, and its trade and commerce.

=== Steel ===
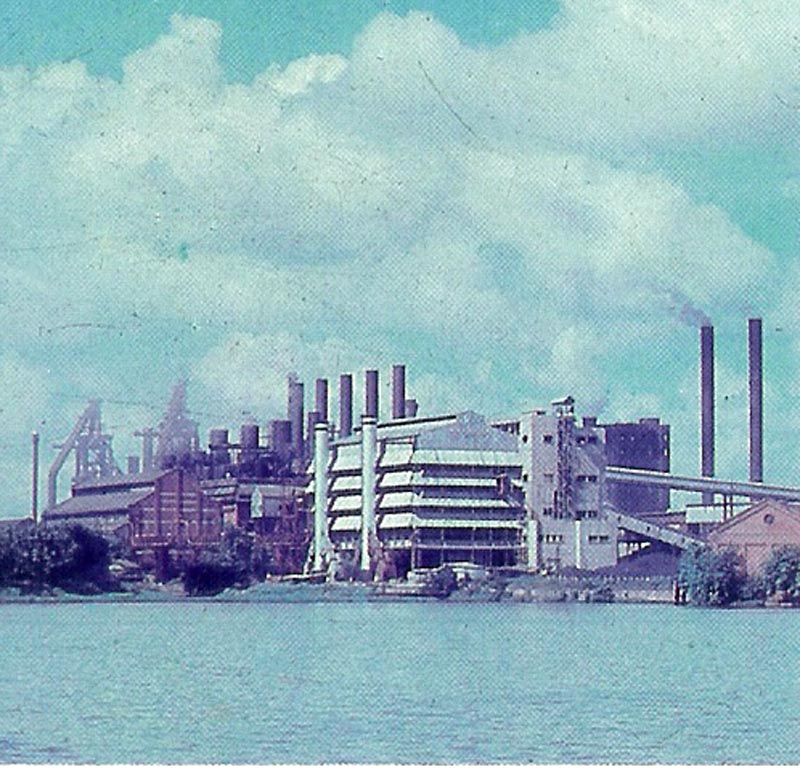
IISCO panoramic view, Asansol

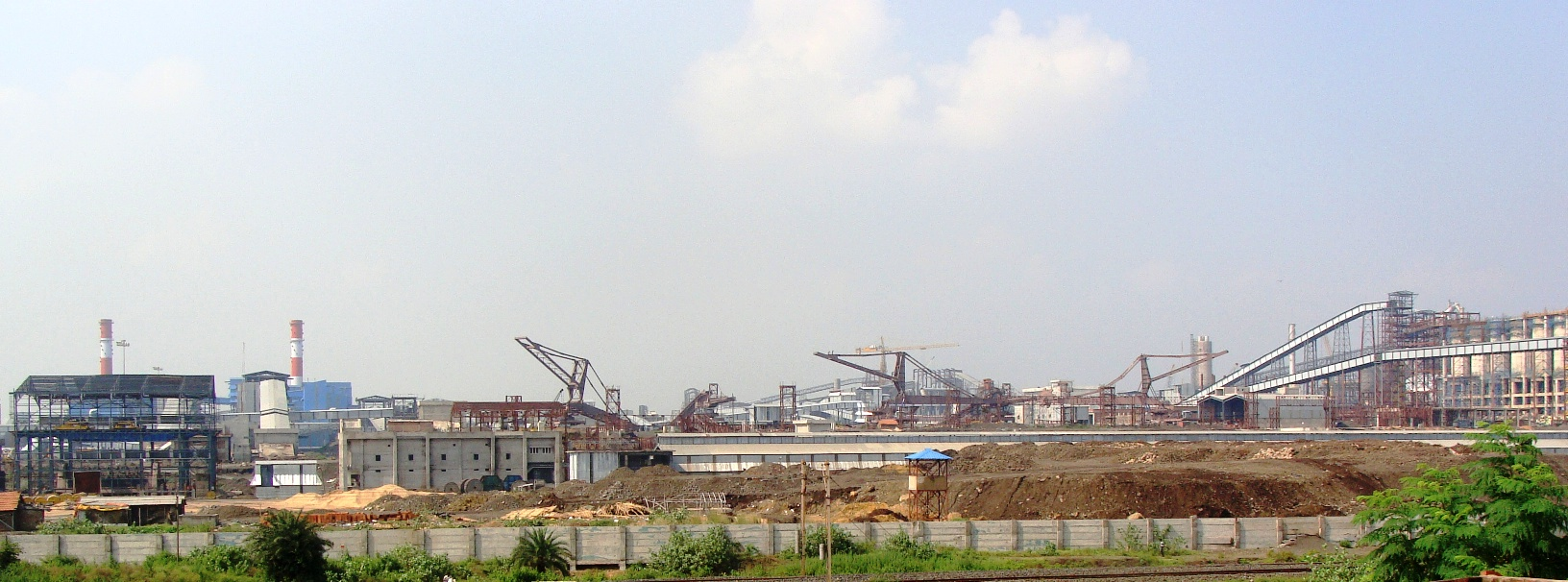
Modernised ISP

The Steel Authority of India IISCO (Indian Iron and Steel Company Ltd) steel-making plant at Kulti was the first such facility in India. It became well known during the 1960s and 1970s, with its company shares being traded on the London Stock Exchange. However, a decade later the company became loss-making until it was revived in 2006 when it merged with the Steel Authority of India. Modernisation at IISCO Steel Plant has helped the city develop at a very rapid pace. The plant's capacity will be raised from 0.4 MT to 2.5 MT of saleable steel, using what will be the biggest blast furnace in the country. As of 2015, the investment for modernisation was the single largest investment in West Bengal till then.

=== Coal ===
Eastern Coalfields, which has its headquarters in Sanctoria P.O. - Dishergarh, has a significant presence in the area due to the huge deposits of high-quality coal. However, most of the coalfields and surrounding residential colonies are located away from the main city. Nearby areas like Raniganj, Chinakuri, and Jamuria are of particular importance as coal blocks. As of 2012, the total coal reserve in the ECL command area up to 600 metre depth was 49.17 billion tonnes.

=== Railways ===
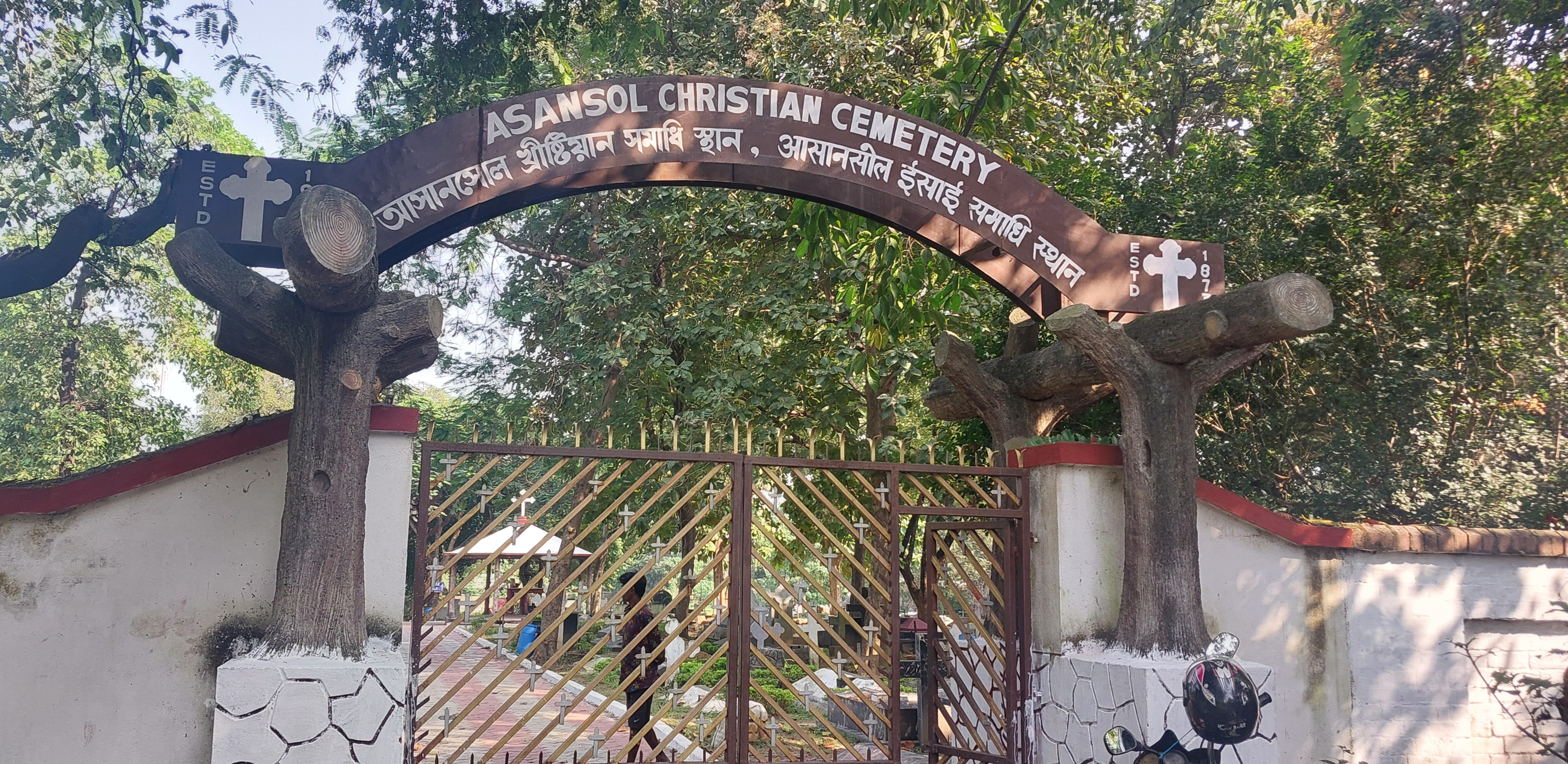
Asansol Christian Cemetery

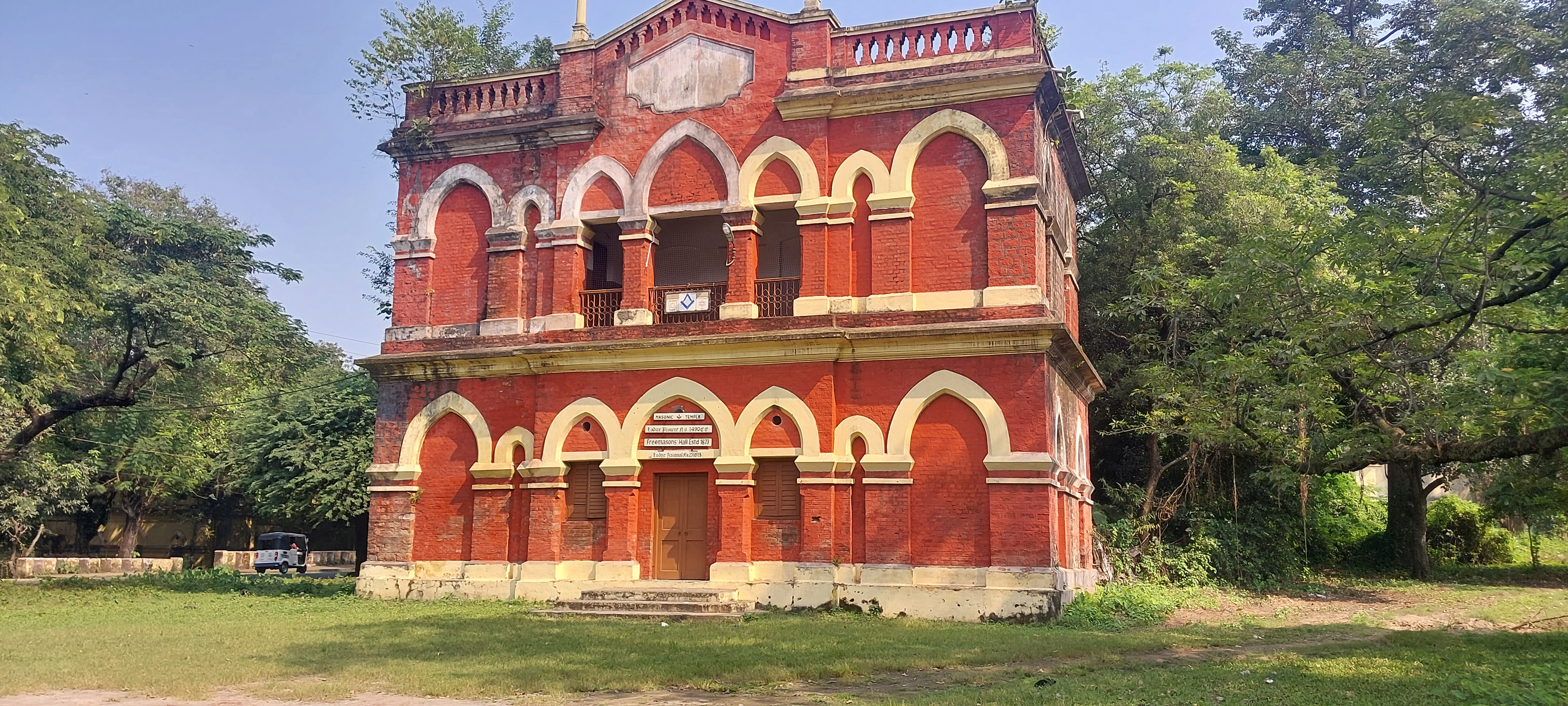
Freemasons Hall, Asansol, founded in 1873

Railways also is a big contributor to the economy of Asansol. Railways were the first employer in the city and they are credited with developing the city in the late 19th century. Asansol is one of four divisions of Eastern Railway Zone and among the major revenue generating divisions in Indian Railways. World's largest vertically integrated organisation Chittaranjan Locomotive Works under Indian Railways is also situated here. It is India's first locomotive works and Asia's largest Locomotive manufacturer.

=== Other business ventures ===
Other industries include Dishergarh Power Supply, Damodar Valley Corporation, Burn Standard Co. which is now a subsidiary of Eastern Railways, Hindustan Cables Limited and cement factories like Burnpur Cement.

== Transport ==
=== Road ===
The Grand Trunk Road (NH 19 - old numbering NH 2) runs across the subdivision and NH 14 (old numbering NH 60) connects Asansol with Odisha. NH 19 has been broadened as part of the Golden Quadrilateral project and now allows three-lane traffic in both directions. A highway bypass avoids the areas of Ushagram, Murgasol, Asansol Bazar, Chelidanga, BNR, Gopalpur, Neamatpur, Kulti, and Barakar. Some of the other important roads of the city are namely Vivekananda Avenue, Burnpur Road, and S.B Gorai Road.

The South Bengal State Transport Corporation operates daily bus services to Kolkata and numerous other destinations, such as Malda, Siliguri, Midnapur, Bankura, Siuri, Purulia, Burdwan, Kalna, Howrah, Barrackpore, Digha, Bolpur, Kirnahar and Berhampore. The North Bengal State Transport Corporation also runs services to and from the city and towns in North Bengal like Malda, Raiganj and Balurghat. There are also many private buses, Taxis and Radio Taxis, which ply locally and on intercity and interstate routes.

=== Railway ===
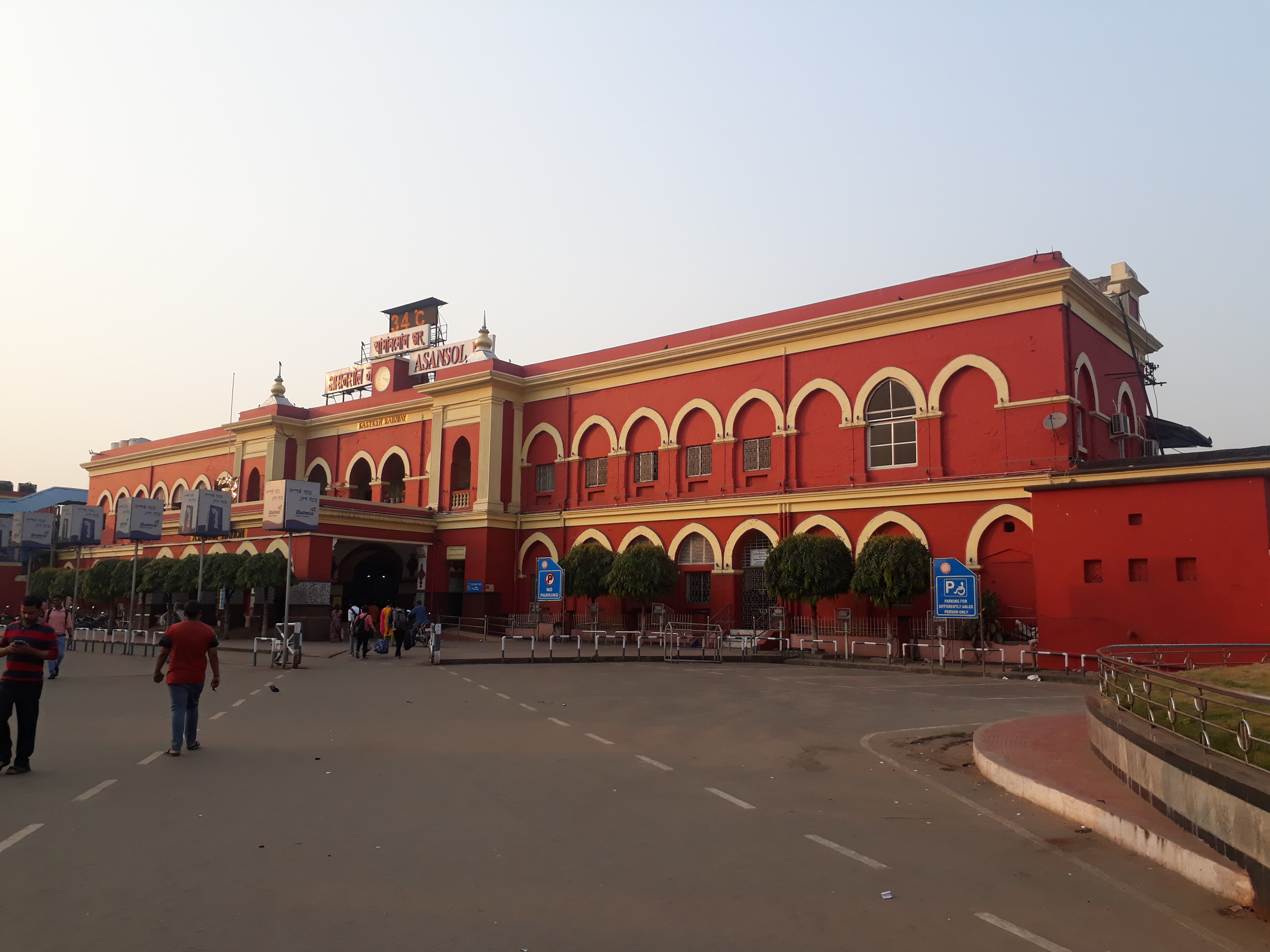
Asansol Junction railway station building

Asansol Junction railway station is the Division of Eastern Railway zone This is one of the oldest divisions on the Indian Railways and has always been in the forefront of operations, both freight and passenger. As far as Eastern Railway is concerned, Asansol Division is referred to as the heart of operations, being at the crossroads of the Grand Chord route via Gaya and the main line route via Patna. With a total of 629.38 route kilometres, the division has the unique distinction of having quadruple lines (two up and two down line) from Khana to Sitarampur.

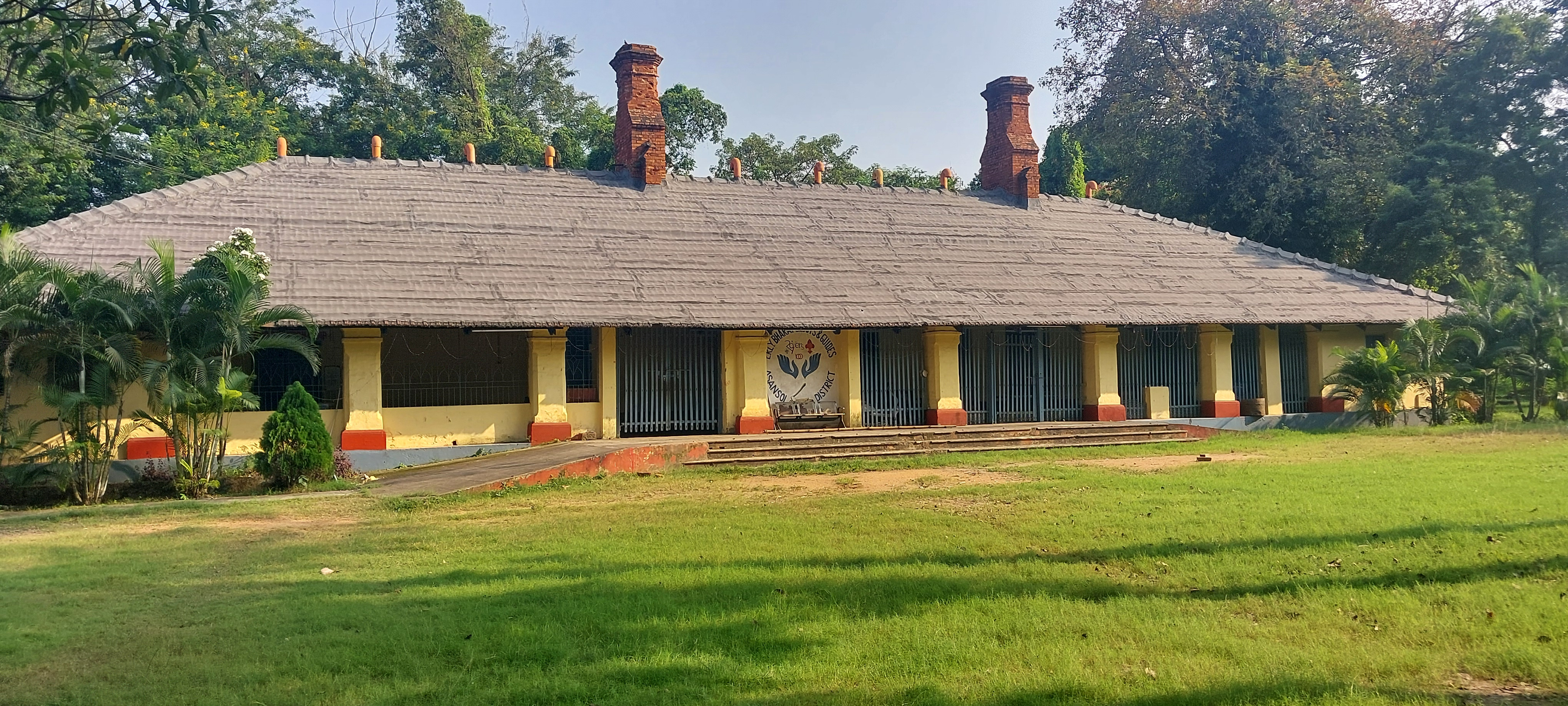
Eastern Railway Scouts and Guides camp in Asansol

The railway track from Kolkata to Delhi passes through the subdivision and bifurcates into the main line and the grand chord line at Sitarampur railway junction, a little to the west of Asansol railway junction. Another railway track links Asansol with Adra and then to Jamshedpur via Purulia and Kharagpur via Bankura. A branch line connects Andal with Sainthia on the Sahibganj Loop.

Almost all the trains linking Kolkata with north India also connect with Asansol including Howrah-Patna Vande Bharat Express, Sealdah Rajdhani, Howrah Rajdhani, Howrah Duronto, Sealdah Humsafar Express, Yuva Express and Shalimar Duronto. As a result, Asansol also connects with cities like New Delhi, Jammu, Amritsar, Ludhiana, Allahabad, Kanpur, Lucknow, Dehradun, Jaipur, Kota, Jodhpur, Jaisalmer, Gwalior, Bhopal, Indore, Patna, Ranchi, Durgapur and Dhanbad, while also directing traffic movement towards the western cities like Mumbai, Ahmedabad and Surat and southern cities like Bhubaneshwar, Visakhapatnam, Vijaywada, Chennai, Bangalore and Trivandrum. It is also connected with Guwahati in the north-east region.

=== Air ===
The domestic airport that serves the city is Kazi Nazrul Islam Airport. The airport is located in Andal. It is roughly 25 kilometres (16 mi) from the Asansol City Bus Terminus.

There is also a private airport located at Burnpur Riverside Area. At present this Airport is operated by IISCO. Recently Airport Authority of India gave nod to start commercial flights for six routes in West Bengal; Burnpur Airport is one of them.

== Education ==
Kazi Nazrul University is a public state research university located in Asansol. As an affiliating university, its jurisdiction primarily encompasses the Asansol and Durgapur subdivisions.

Among the many educational institutions are:

=== Schools ===
- Asansol Ramakrishna Mission High School
- Assembly of God Church School
- DAV Public School, Asansol
- Loreto Convent, Asansol
- Kendriya Vidyalaya, Asansol
- St. Patrick's Higher Secondary School
- St. Vincent's High and Technical School
- Subhaspally Bidyaniketan

=== Colleges ===
- Asansol Engineering College
- Asansol Girls' College
- Asansol Polytechnic
- Banwarilal Bhalotia College
- Bengal Homoeopathic Medical College and Hospital
- Bidhan Chandra College, Asansol
- Kanyapur Polytechnic
- Kulti College
- Raniganj Girls' College
- St. Xavier's College, Asansol
- Triveni Devi Bhalotia College
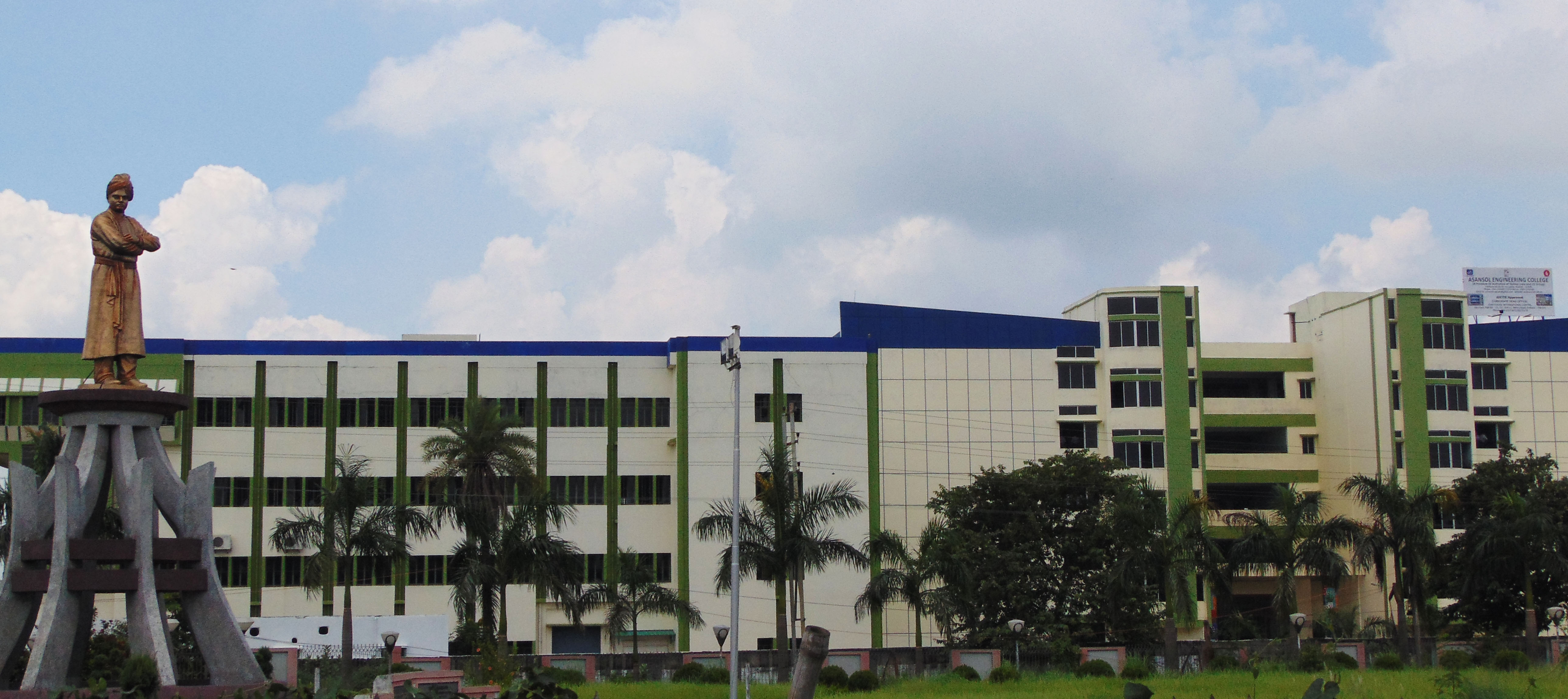
Asansol Engineering College

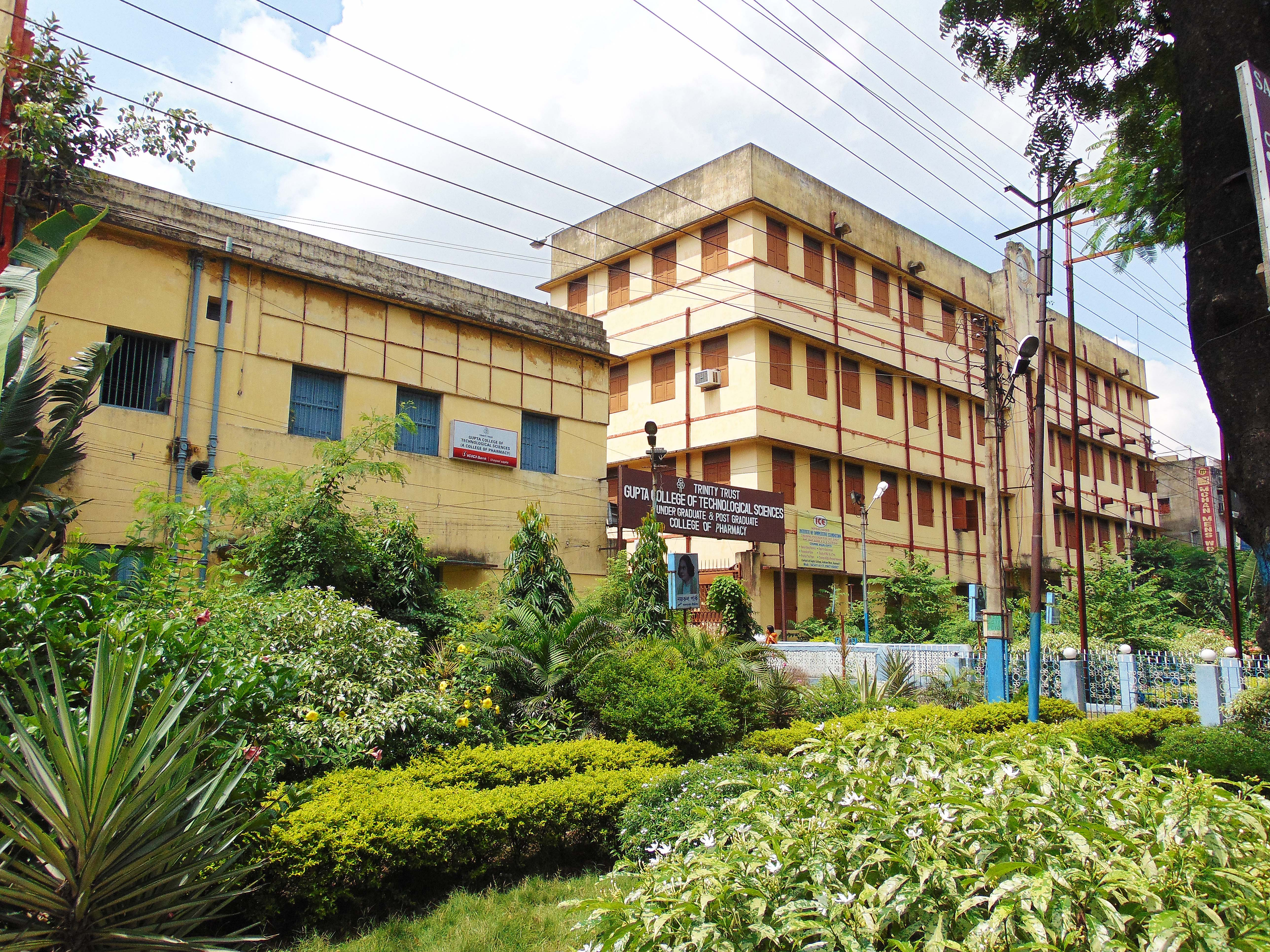
Gupta College of Technological Sciences

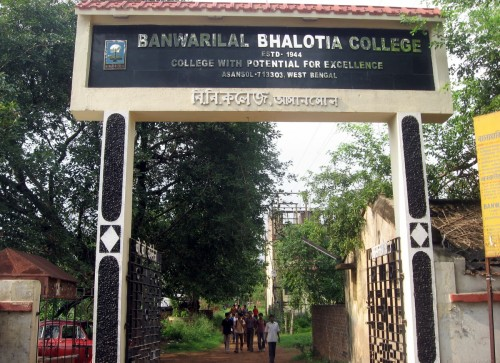
Banwarilal Bhalotia College

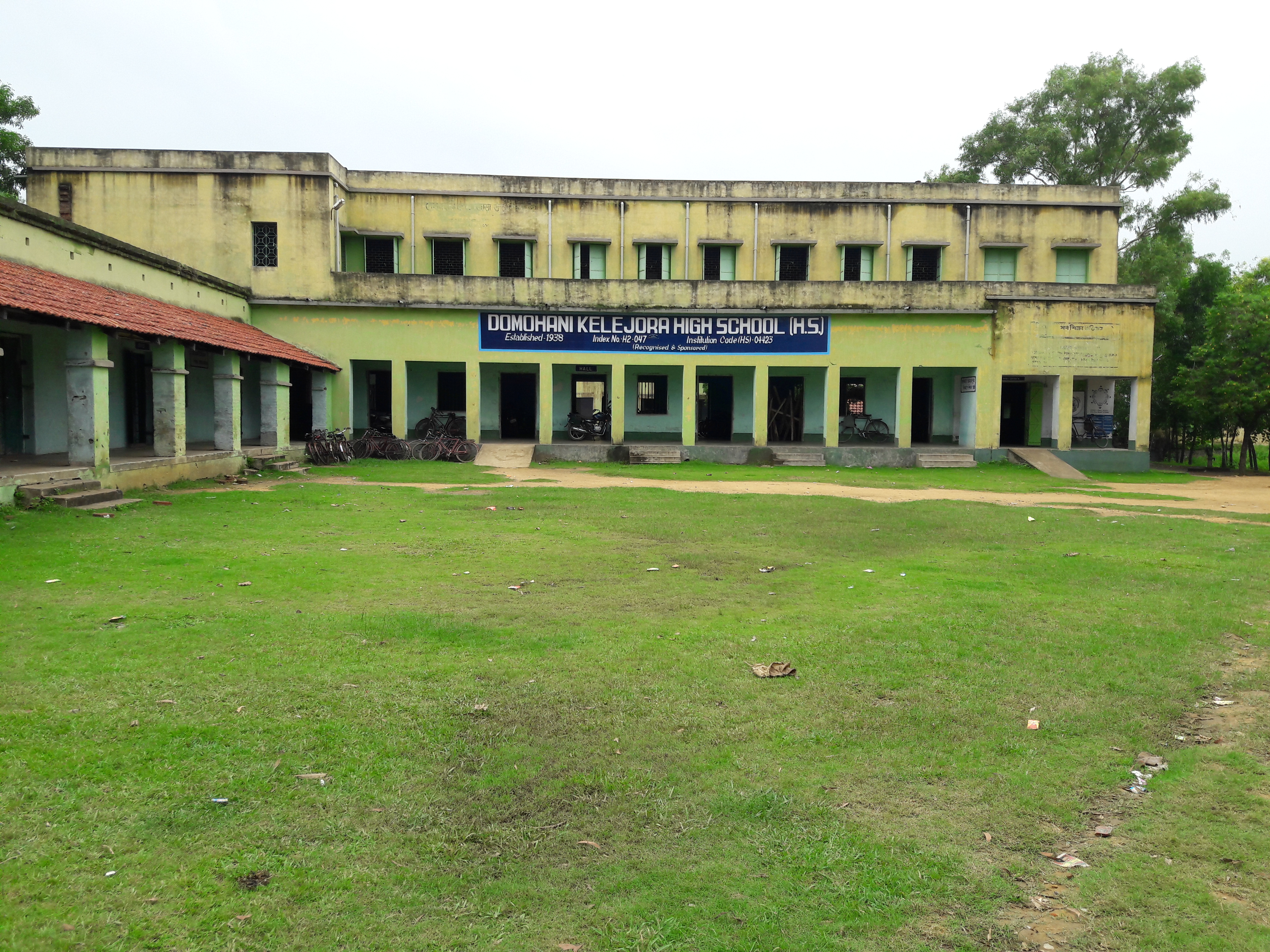
Domohani Kelejora High School

=== Libraries ===
There are several public libraries, including the District Library.

== Media ==
Prasar Bharati has a High Power Transmitter Station at Asansol which broadcasts Doordarshan National / Bangla and Doordarshan News Channel. Transmissions are not only received by the city but also neighbouring places. Other than national channels, several local channels are available through cable TV networks, such as Vision 24, Drishti Channel, ATV, and ISP Channel.

Asansol currently has four FM radio stations: All India Radio 100.3 FM, 92.7 BIG FM, 93.5 RED FM and Radio Mirchi 95 FM.

== Sports facilities ==
- The Polo Ground has been a landmark in Asansol for a long time. The ground got its name from the sport of polo which was played here during British rule. Asansol Indoor Stadium is on the same site and has a capacity of 500 spectators. The stadium, which is notable for having the largest shell concrete roof in the district, has two badminton courts and an interchangeable volleyball court. Adjacent to this is Asansol Stadium, where both district and subdivision level football and cricket matches are played.
- Eastern Railway Divisional Stadium, popularly known as the Loco Ground, houses several district and subdivision level football and cricket tournaments.
- The Burnpur Football Stadium is a centre of extensive sports activities. Players groomed in the SAIL Football Academy at Burnpur have represented SAIL in the Kolkata IFA and 1st Division League matches.
- Burnpur Cricket Club Ground is a first-class level cricket stadium located at Burnpur.
- Asansol Rifle Club Shooting Range is located in Kanyapur Road beside the Ravindra Vidyala Government School. The Rifle Shooting ground founded in the year 1951 under the initiation of some elite citizen of Asansol under the aegis of WBRA and NRAI.
- Kazi Nazrul Islam Krirangan is being developed as an international standard stadium at the former Sen Raleigh Football Ground.
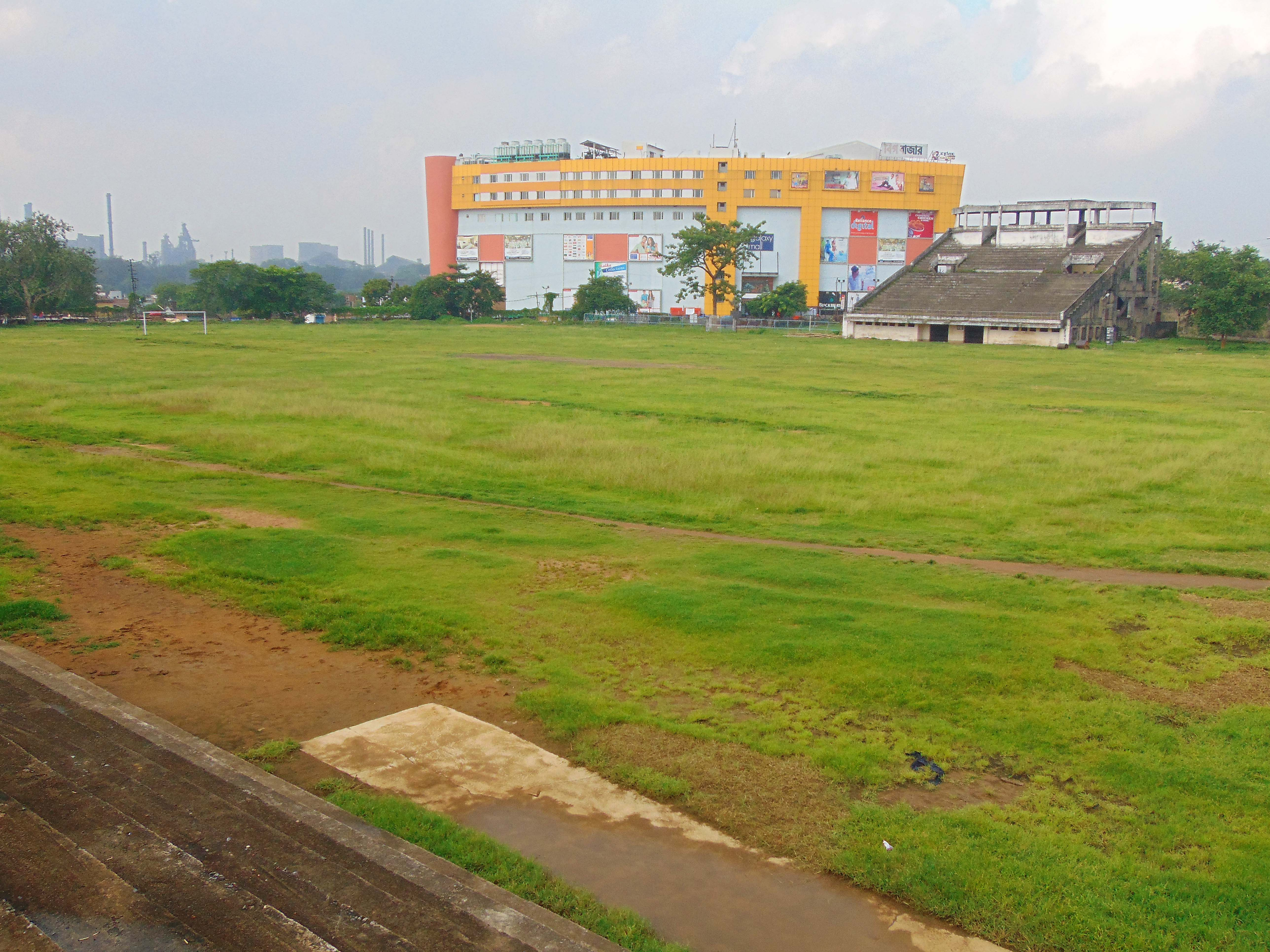
Asansol Stadium (Polo Ground)

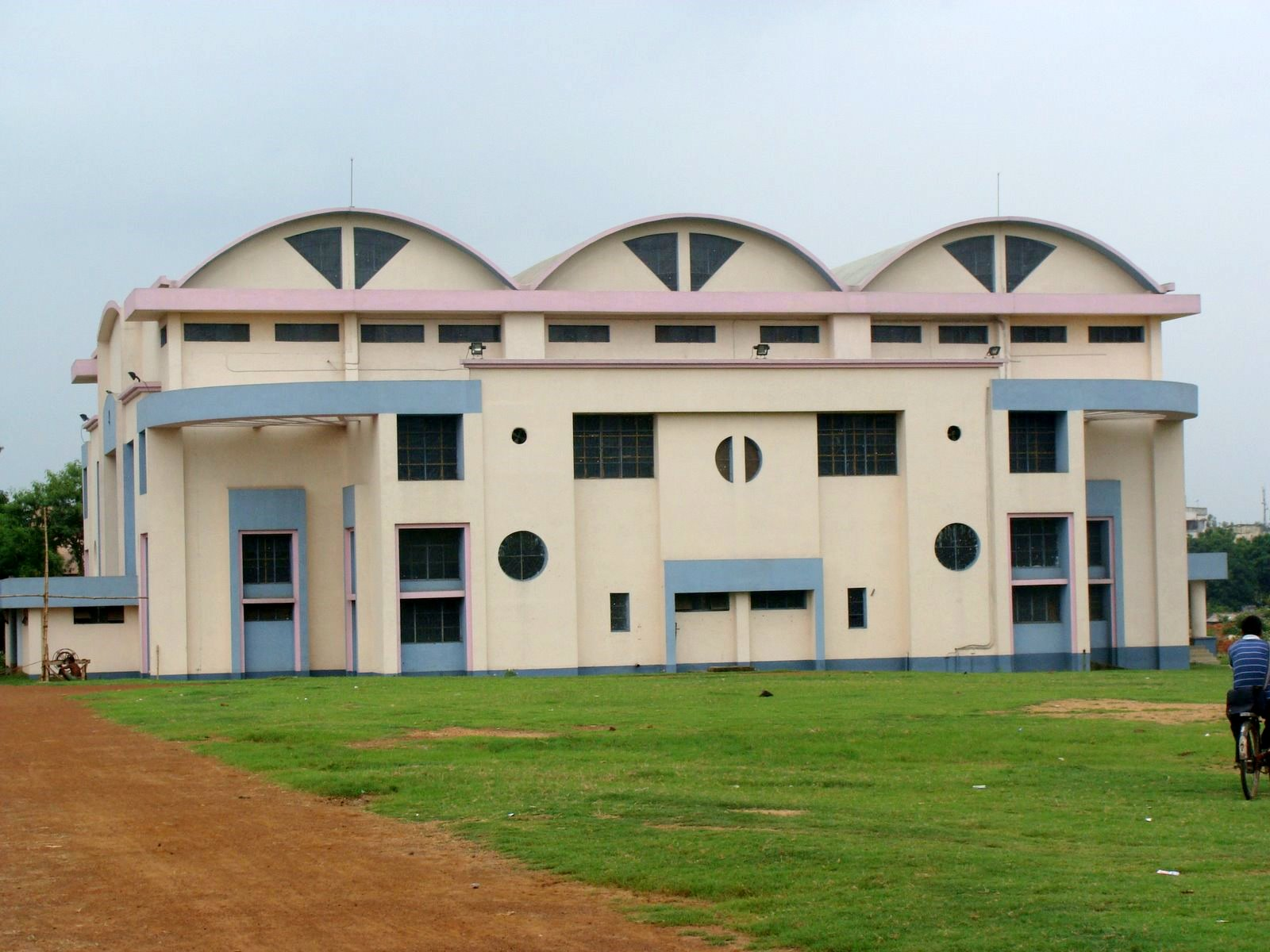
Asansol Sports Complex

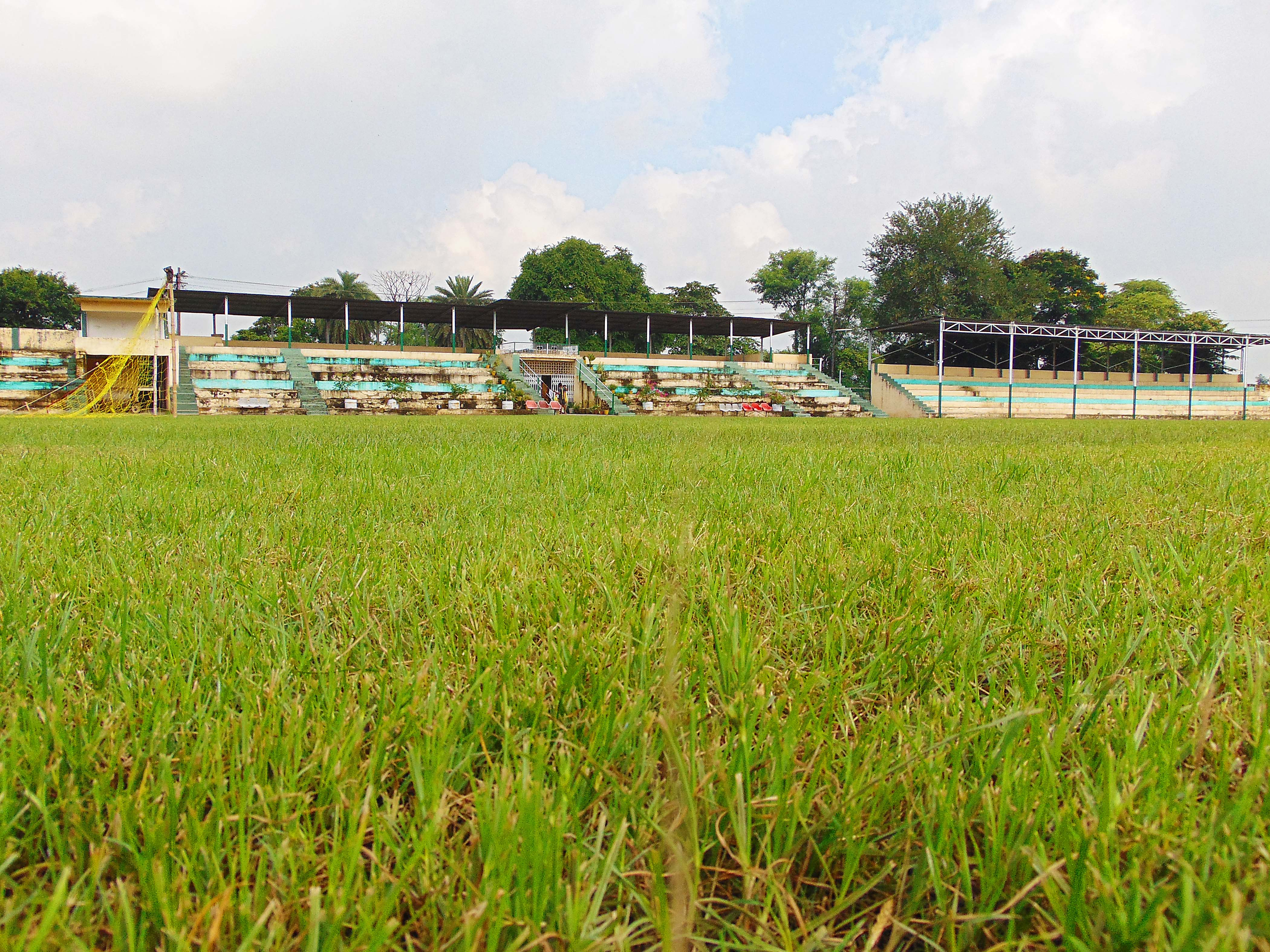
Divisional Railway Stadium or Loco Ground

== Notable people ==
- S. S. Ahluwalia
- Arjun Atwal
- Ajitesh Bandopadhyay
- Meenakshi Banerjee, scientist
- Sayan Banerjee, footballer playing for East Bengal FC
- Timir Biswas, Indian playback singer and composer
- Susmita Chatterjee, Indian actress
- Ritwik Das, Indian footballer
- Kazi Nazrul Islam, writer, lyricist and poet
- Manoj Kumar Mukherjee
- Minakshi Mukherjee, politician
- Bhagirath Samai, Indian professional shooter
- Vivek Singh
- Sharmila Tagore, Indian actress
- Dilara Zaman, Bangladeshi actress

== See also ==
- List of cities in West Bengal
- Asansol Sadar subdivision
- Largest Indian cities by GDP
- Sacred Heart Church, Asansol
