= Kazi Nazrul University =

Public university in Asansol, West Bengal

- Motto: Vidyayā'mritamașnute
- Motto in English: Immortal through knowledge
- Type: Public research university
- Established: 16 August 2012 (14 years ago)
- Accreditation: NAAC
- Academic affiliations: AICTE; AIU; BCI; UGC
- Budget: ₹27.78 crore (US$2.9 million) (FY2026–27 est.)
- Chancellor: Governor of West Bengal
- Vice-Chancellor: Uday Bandyopadhyay
- Academic staff: 128 (2023)
- Students: 2,268 (2023)
- Undergraduates: 305 (2023)
- Postgraduates: 1,675 (2023)
- Doctoral students: 288 (2023)
- Location: Asansol, West Bengal, India; 23°41′41.09″N 86°59′41.7″E
- Campus: Midsize city 15.6 acres (6.3 ha)
- Mascots: Flambeau & Sitar
- Website: www.knu.ac.in

Kazi Nazrul University (KNU) is a public state research university located in Asansol, West Bengal, India. Ex chief minister Mamata Banerjee laid the foundation stone on 10 January 2013. The university has been named after the Bengali poet Kazi Nazrul Islam. The university was established under the Kazi Nazrul University Act, 2012. Anuradha Mukherjee was appointed as the first vice-chancellor of the university. In 2018 in a special convocation the university honored the former Prime Minister of Bangladesh Sheikh Hasina with an honorary Doctorate of Literature.

== Organisation and administration ==
=== Governance ===
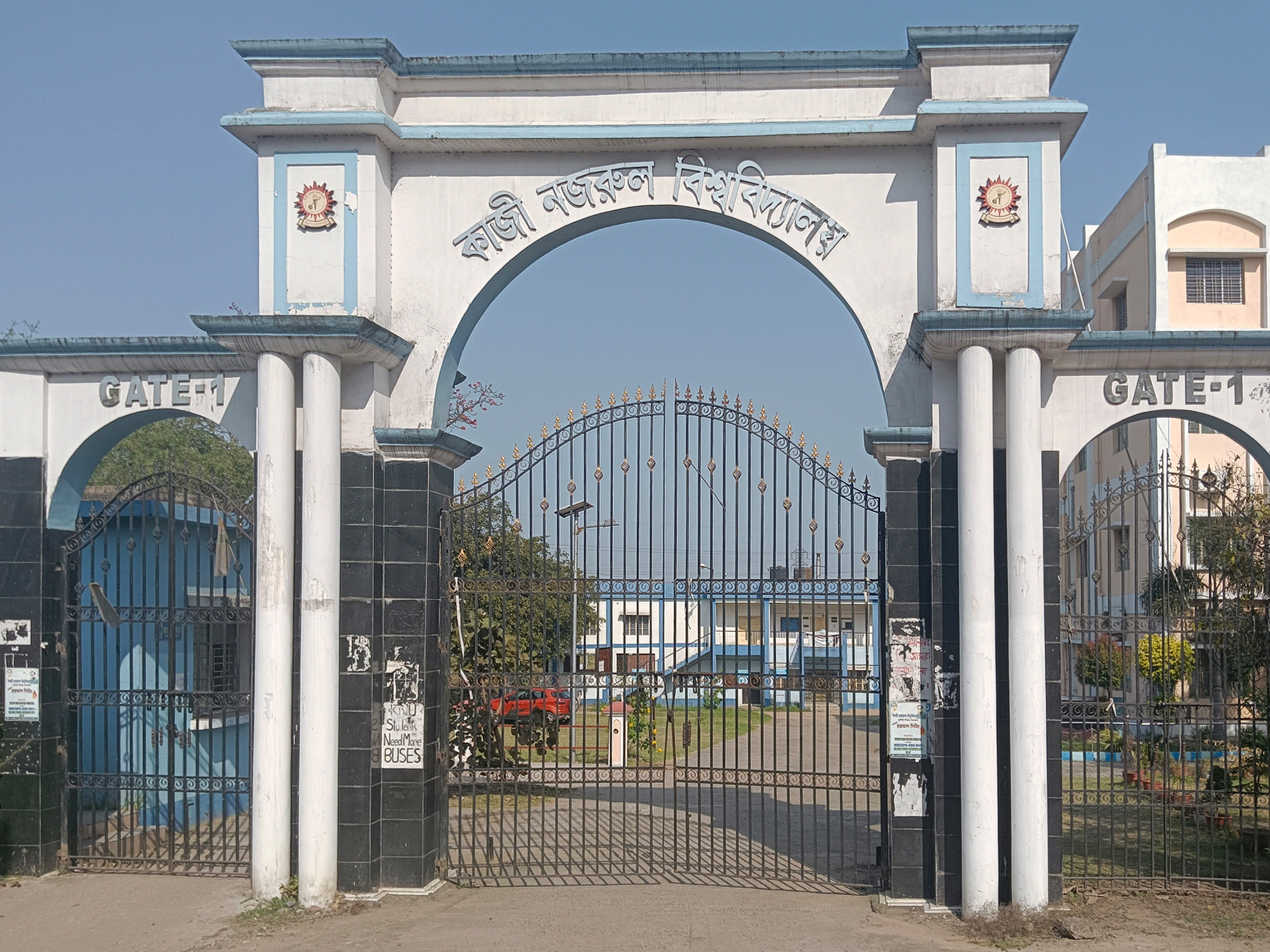
Kazi Nazrul University, Asansol Gate-1

List of All Vice-Chancellors
- Anuradha Mukherjee, 2012–2014; Sajal Kumar Bhattacharya, 2014–2015; Sadhan Chakrabarti, 2015–2023; Debashis Bandyopadhyay (acting), 2023–2024; Uday Bandyopadhyay, 2025–present

In October 2025 Governor of West Bengal, as chancellor of universities, appointed Uday Bandyopadhyay as vice chancellor of the university.

=== Jurisdiction ===
The university is an affiliating institution and has jurisdiction over the colleges of the Paschim Bardhaman district.

=== Faculties ===
Kazi Nazrul University has 19 departments organized into four faculty councils.

Faculty Council for Post-Graduate Studies in Arts, Fine Arts, Performing Arts and Traditional Art Forms
Department of Bengali	Department of Hindi	Department of English	Department of Urdu
Department of Education	Department of History	Department of Phyilosophy	Department of Political Sciences
Nazrul Sangeet
Faculty Council for Post-Graduate Studies in Commerce and Management
Department Of Commerce
Faculty Council for Post-Graduate Studies in Law, Education, Journalism and Mass Communication, Library Science and Physical Education
Department of Law
Faculty Council for Post-Graduate Studies in Science, Technology and Vocational Studies
Department of Animal Science	Department of Applied Psychology	Department of Chemistry	Department of Computer Science
Department of Geography	Department of Mathematics	Department of Physics	
Department of Mining Engineering	Department of Metallurgical Engineering	Department of Allied Health Science and Technology	

=== Schools ===
- School of Health Science and Technology
- School of Management
- School of Mines And Metallurgy

In 2016 CM Mamata Banerjee gave clearance to set up the Institute for Mines, Minerals and Metallurgic Sciences in Asansol under Kazi Nazrul University. The university now offers courses like Diploma, B.Tech., B.Sc., M.Sc. and PhD. A 7 acre plot has been allotted for the institute's campus. The School of Mines and Metallurgy consists of the Department Of Mining Engineering and Metallurgical Engineering and Computer Science and Engineering (Data Science).

=== Centres ===
Centre For Studies
- Centre For Organic Spintronics And Optoelectronics Devices(COSOD)
- Centre for Studies In Clinical Psychology
- Centre for Counselling & Positive Psychology
- Centre for Entrepreneurship and Skill Development
- Centre for Studies in History of society and Culture
- Centre for Studies of South & South-East Asian Societies
- Centre for Studies in Ethics & Socio-Political Philosophy
- Centre for Theatre Studies & Performance
- Centre for Critical Social Inquiry
- Nazrul Centre for Social & Cultural Studies

== Academics ==
=== Admission ===
- For UG & PG: Good marks in the higher secondary (10+2) and graduation (10+2+3) levels are necessary for admission in the undergraduate and postgraduate courses offered by the university.
- For B.Tech: Admission through Centralized Counselling based on WBJEE rank conducted by West Bengal Joint Entrance Examination Board and time to time notification issued by Department of Higher Education, Govt. of West Bengal. also students can admitted through Joint Entrance for Lateral Entry (JELET) exam conducted by West Bengal Joint Entrance Examination Board in lateral entry in 2nd year (3rd semester) of the four-year course of bachelor's degree in technology.
- For MCA: Admission through Centralized Counselling based on JECA rank conducted by West Bengal Joint Entrance Examination Board in 2 years of Master of Computer Application (MCA) course.

=== Research ===
In May 2015 Chief Minister Mamata Banerjee announced a Nazrul Research Centre would be established at the university, it's been a long pending demand from poet's family. In 2023 the University signed agreement with Taylor's University from Malaysia for research and faculty exchange programme.

=== Libraries ===
The Central Library of Kazi Nazrul University was established in 2013. It is located in a convenient place on the ground floor of the Vidyacharya Building. The books are classified according to the Dewey Decimal Classification. All books are barcoded. Students of affiliated colleges are also be able to enter the central library. The collection of books includes documents on a wide range of topics, including Bengali literature, English literature, pure science, art, history and social sciences, and language. The university library has a valuable collection of more than 20,000 books. In 2024 the university started to digitise Kazi Nazrul Islam's manuscripts and shellac records to preserve culturally important archives.

=== Publishing ===
In 2022, the university started to publish the journal Nazrul Journal.

=== Rankings ===
Kazi Nazrul University was ranked 65th among the academic institutions in India by the Nature Index in 2023.

=== Accreditation and recognition ===
In July 2019, the university was given membership of the Association of Indian Universities.

The University Grants Commission (U.G.C.) accorded recognition to the university in accordance with Section 12B of the U.G.C. Act, in 2019.

In September 2021, the university has been awarded Grade B with a CGPA of 2.1 by the NAAC.

== Controversies ==
The university suddenly suspended giving the Nazrul award, and in 2022 the state body discontinued the award in the poet's name.

- List of universities in India
- Universities and colleges of West Bengal
