= Dishergarh =

- Neighbourhood in Asansol
- Location in West Bengal, India
- Coordinates: 23.69°N 86.85°E
- Country: India
- State: West Bengal
- District: Paschim Bardhaman
- City: Asansol
- Municipal Corporation: Asansol Municipal Corporation
- AMC Wards No.s: 103,104,105

Languages*
  - Official: Bengali, Hindi, English
- Time zone: UTC+5:30 (IST)
- PIN: 713333
- Telephone code: 0341
- Vehicle registration: WB-38, WB-44, WB-37(Commercial)
- Lok Sabha constituency: Asansol
- Vidhan Sabha constituency: Kulti
- Website: paschimbardhaman.co.in

Dishergarh is a neighbourhood in Asansol of Paschim Bardhaman district in the Indian state of West Bengal. It is governed by Asansol Municipal Corporation. It is situated at the border of the Purulia district and Paschim Bardhaman district in West Bengal. The State Highway 5 (West Bengal) (SH5) passes through Dishergarh. The neighbourhood is located on the banks of Damodar River.

== History ==
According to popular belief, the name "Dishergarh" originated from "Shergarh" i.e. "The Fort of Sher Afghan", the Jagirdar of Burdwan. The British referral to the place as "The Shergarh" mutated into "Dishergarh". Probably, this fort was a holiday resort of Sher Afghan who was the first husband of Mehr- un - nissa (later Noor Jehan after marrying Jehangir). It is said that Jehangir got Sher Afghan killed to possess Mehr - un - nissa whose renowned beauty he was obsessed with. Although, there is no direct evidence to prove that Sher Afghan used to visit Shergarh with Mehr - un - nissa, some local names nearby the area point its link towards royalty. For example, Hatinal (meaning place for elephants), Mahotdih (meaning place for Mahots), Sanctoria (meaning place for shell work). Remnants of a semicircular mote, ideal in design as a defensive canal, can be found even today, very prominent at Bhanga Pool area on the way to Barakar and also at Sodepur.

During the British rule, Dishergarh (Shergarh) was one of their important locations in terms of commerce. The colony had one of the oldest European Clubs and tennis courts of the area, the remnants of which are visible up to this day.

== Geography ==
Cities, towns and ECL Areas in the western portion of Asansol Sadar subdivision in Paschim Bardhaman district
MC: municipal corporation, P: rural administrative centre, CT: census town, N: neighbourhood, OG: out growth, T: temple
Owing to space constraints in the small map, the actual locations in a larger map may vary slightly

=== Location ===
Asansol is composed of undulating laterite region. The Damodar River flows through this area. For ages, the area was heavily forested and infested with plunderers and marauders. The discovery of coal led to industrialisation of the area and most of the forests have been cleared.

The area forms the lowest step of the Chota Nagpur Plateau. The general scenario is undulating land with scattered hills. It is located North of Damodar River.

Dishergarh is at the confluence of the Damodar River and Barakar River with Khudia river as the 'falgu nadi', thus making it a Triveni Sangam, an auspicious happening for Hindus.

=== Urbanisation ===
As per the 2011 census, 83.33% of the population of Asansol Sadar subdivision was urban and 16.67% was rural. Asansol Sadar subdivision has 26 (+1 partly) Census Towns. (partly presented in the map alongside; all places marked on the map are linked in the full-screen map).

=== Asansol Municipal Corporation ===
According to the Kolkata Gazette notification of 3 June 2015, the municipal areas of Kulti, Raniganj and Jamuria were included within the jurisdiction of Asansol Municipal Corporation.

*For language details see Salanpur (community development block)#Language and religion

== Economy ==
It is an important coal mining area of Eastern Coalfields Ltd., a subsidiary of Coal India Limited. This area of Paschim Bardhaman district is linked with Par Beliya under Neturia Police Station in Purulia District with a bridge across the Damodar River.

The Headquarters of Eastern Coalfields Limited (ECL), A Subsidiary of Coal India Limited is situated in Barakar Road, Sanctoria. There is a Training Institute for Coal India employees.

The Dishergarh Power Supply (DPS) Company also has its Central office at Jhalbagan, Sanctoria with the main power plant being located at Chinakuri.

The place basically consists of a straight road which bifurcates at the Dishegarh Post Office More, one towards Asansol via Neamatpur and the other towards Barakar . The place also consists of the Eastern Coalfields Ltd. office at Sanctoria, Central Office of Dishergarh Power Supply Company, some commercial establishments and residential areas thereafter.

== Culture ==
=== Chhinnamasta Temple ===
There is Chhinnamasta Temple on the banks of the Damodar River. Melas are held every year in makuri saptami to ekadashi the Temple surroundings. The local people call this Mela as Chhinnamastar Mela.

=== Sher Shah Baba's Mazar ===
There is also a pilgrimage centre for Muslim community known to the local people as Sher Shah Baba ka Mazar. Melas are also held generally during the months of March and April. The local language of this area is Hindi and Bengali.

Other temples: Babubasa Kali Temple, Hanuman Temple

=== Purbachal park ===
There is a purbachal park on the banks of the Damodar River.

== Educational institutions ==
Dishergarh A.C. Institution, SD Girls High School, Sanctoria High School are the main schools in Dishergarh. However the medium of Instruction in these schools is through Bengali language. However, there are many English Medium Schools nearby Dishergarh

- Loyola School in Chirkunda in Dhanbad District
- De Nobili School in Mugma and Maithan in Dhanbad District
- Assembly of God Church School in Sodepur and Asansol
- Green Point Academy in Kulti
- St. Patrick High School in Asansol
- St. Vincent's High and Technical School in Asansol
- Little Flower School in Sanctoria

Some Colleges near Dishergarh

- Banwarilal Bhalotia College in Asansol
- Bidhan Chandra College in Asansol
- Kulti College in Asansol
- Asansol Engineering College in Asansol
- Asansol Government Polytechnic in Asansol
- Bengal Homoeopathic Medical College and Hospital in Asansol
- Panchakot Mahavidyalaya in Panchakot in Purulia District
- B.S.K College in Maithan in Dhanbad District
- S.H.M.S. Inter Mahavidyalaya in Chirkunda in Dhanbad District

== Healthcare ==
The 250-bed Sanctoria Hospital of Eastern Coalfields is located at Barakar Road, Sanctoria, Dishergarh.

A new Health Centre will be started shortly under Asansol Municipal Corporation by Councillors of 104 & 105 No.s Wards.

Medical facilities (dispensaries) in the Sodepur Area of ECL are available at Chinakuri I & II (PO Sundarchak), Chinakuri Mine III (PO Radhanagar), Parbelia (PO Neturia), Narsamuda (PO Mithani), Bejdih (PO Kulti), Mithani (PO Mithani), Patmohna (PO Patmohna), Sodepur 9/10 (PO Sundarchak), Mouthdih (PO Sundarchak), Dhemo Main (PO Main Dhemo).

== Tourist attraction ==
- Maithon - The Lake at Maithon is spread across an area of 65 km^{2}. Boating is available here. A Bird Sanctuary and Deer park is also present near this place. From Dishergarh, the distance is 10 km.
- Kalyaneshwari temple - This temple of Maa Kalyaneshwari is very close to Maithon.
- Panchet - Around 10 km from Dishergarh, it is a popular picnic spot.
- Ajodhya Hills - It is a hill located in the Purulia district of the state West Bengal, India. The nearby populated town area is Bagmundi. It is a popular place for young mountaineers to learn the basic course in rock climbing. There is a Forest Rest House here. Near Ajodhya Hills, there is Turga Dam and the Lake, and the pleasant waterfall formed by the River Bamni. The site of the Turga Dam site is a perfect tourist spot, where the visitors can spend their day.
- Garh Panchkot - It is a remote place in the district of Purulia, West Bengal. The ruins of the Panchkot Palace are a silent testimony to the Bargi attack during the 18th century. Garh Panchkot also has a very beautiful Bungalow owned and operated by the West Bengal Forest Development Corporation.
- Joychandi Pahar – It is a picnic spot and centre for rock climbing training is about 30 km from Dishergarh.
- Churulia - where the poet - Kazi Nazrul Islam was born. He is considered the national poet of Bangladesh. The village is about 35 km from Dishergarh, and contains a museum with his works and a memorial.
- Gunjan Ecological Park - Nearly 25 km from Dishergarh, this is a social welfare project of Asansol Police located on G.T. Road at Nigha under Jamuria P.S. It was earlier an abandoned O.C.P. of Eastern Coalfields Limited and was a den of criminals and illegally-mined-coal racketeers. Shri Somen Mitra, IPS, the then Addl S P of Asansol took the initiative to get that area under control of the Asansol police.
- Gangtikulli Island - There is also an island in Damodar river called Gangtikullii for its Jujube (Kul in Bengali) Forest. There are many coal mines of now defunct Bengal Coal Company. It is also a picnic spot.

Nearly 300 acres (1.2 km^{2}) of land with waterbody is now an attraction for the citizens of Asansol, with a mini-zoo and a children's park. During winter, the lake supports hundreds of migratory birds. An anglers' club also exists at the Ecological Park. Asansol police is in a process to develop the area in association with ECL, SAIL-ISP and ADDA.

== Transport ==
Regular Mini Bus services are available to Asansol City Bus Stand (15 km from Dishergarh) and Barakar (5 km).

The State Highway 5 (West Bengal) passes through Dishergarh. Long distance private buses running between Asansol and Purulia (75 km from Dishergarh) have a stoppage at Dishergarh. One can also go to Ranchi (190 km from Dishergarh) or Jamshedpur as direct bus service is available but their count is very small.

Dishergarh has a direct bus connectivity with Kolkata (220 km from Dishergarh) by many buses run by the South Bengal State Transport Corporation from Purulia to Kolkata via Asansol and Durgapur. These buses provide a halt here. It takes only 5 - 5.5 hours by these buses to reach Kolkata. Also many new bus routes towards Purulia & Ranchi is being opened by South Bengal State Transport Corporation & other operators from various parts of the West Bengal which directly pass through Dishergarh and provide a halt here.

But there is no railway connectivity to Dishergarh. One has to go to Asansol Junction, Barakar, Kulti, Burnpur, Sitarampur Junction or Madhukunda in Purulia District stations for catching a train.

== See also ==
- Parbelia
