= Neamatpur =

- Neighbourhood in Asansol
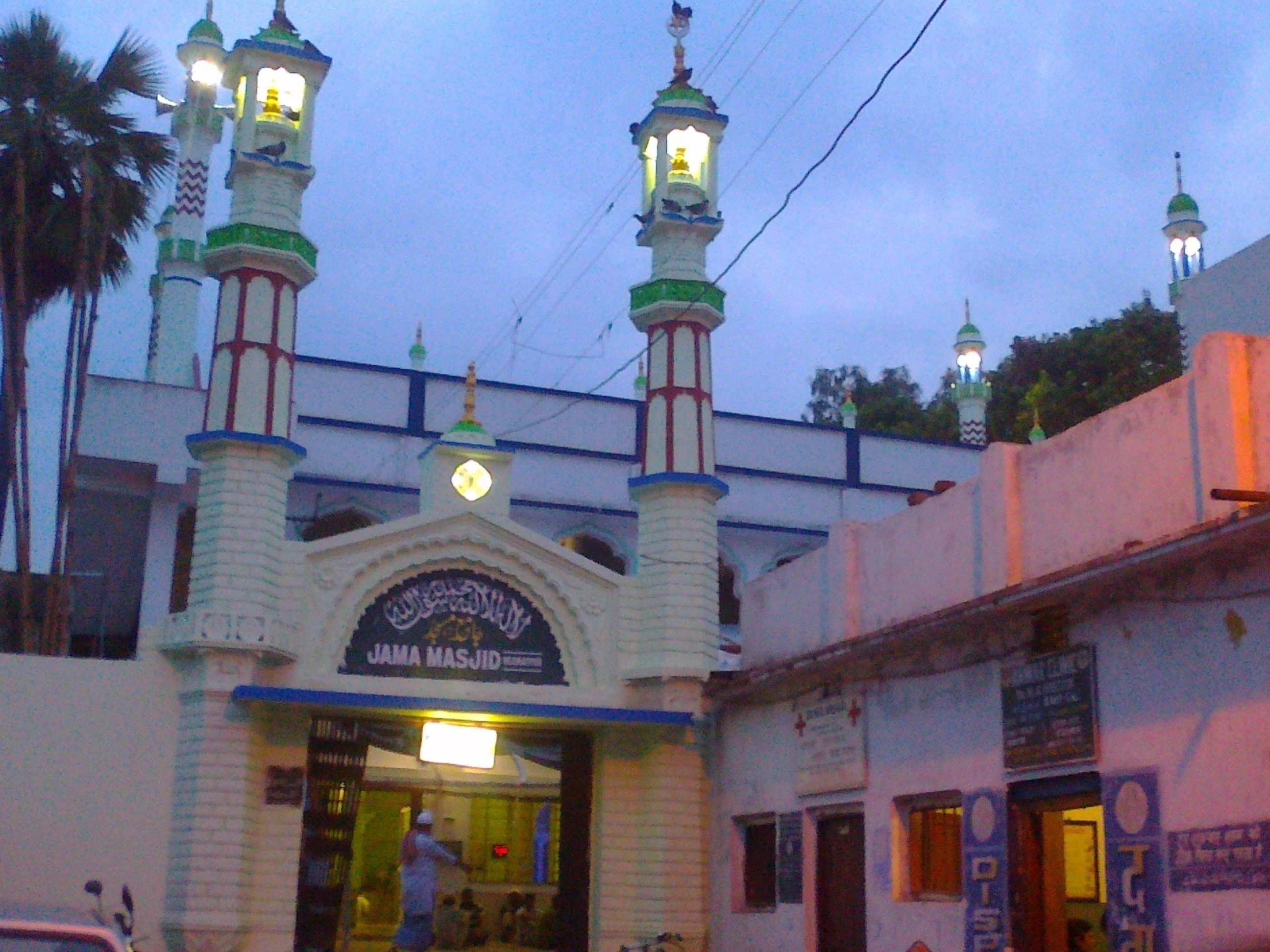

- Location in Asansol, West Bengal, India
- Coordinates: 23.713835°N 86.880694°E
- Country: India
- State: West Bengal
- District: Paschim Bardhaman
- City: Asansol
- Municipal Corporation: Asansol Municipal Corporation
- AMC wards: Ward Nos. 19,59,60,61
- Elevation: 100 m (330 ft)

Languages*
  - Official: Bengali, Hindi, English
- Time zone: UTC+5:30 (IST)
- Postal code: 713 359
- Area code: 0341
- Vehicle registration: WB 37 / WB 38 / WB 44
- Lok Sabha constituency: Asansol
- Vidhan Sabha constituency: Kulti
- Website: paschimbardhaman.co.in

Neamatpur is a neighbourhood in Asansol of Paschim Bardhaman district in the Indian state of West Bengal. It is governed by Asansol Municipal Corporation.

== Geography ==
Cities, towns and ECL Areas in the western portion of Asansol Sadar subdivision in Paschim Bardhaman district
MC: municipal corporation, P: rural administrative centre, CT: census town, N: neighbourhood, OG: out growth, T: temple
Owing to space constraints in the small map, the actual locations in a larger map may vary slightly

=== Location ===
Neamatpur is located at 23°42′50″N 86°52′50″E.

Asansol is composed of undulating laterite soil. This area lies between the Damodar and the Ajay.

At the western fringe of the area the Barakar forms the boundary with Jharkhand. The main railway stations are Asansol Junction railway station and Sitarampur Junction railway station.

=== Urbanisation ===
As per the 2011 census, 83.33% of the population of Asansol Sadar subdivision was urban and 16.67% was rural. Asansol Sadar subdivision has 26 (+1 partly) Census Towns.(partly presented in the map alongside; all places marked on the map are linked in the full-screen map).

=== Asansol Municipal Corporation ===
According to the Kolkata Gazette notification of 3 June 2015, the municipal areas of Kulti, Raniganj and Jamuria were included within the jurisdiction of Asansol Municipal Corporation.

*For language details see Salanpur (community development block)#Language and religion

== Economy ==
It is in the heart of the coal mining zone. Neamatpur Central Workshop of Eastern Coalfield Ltd situated at Lithuria Road, Neamatpur. Some people in Neamatpur are also engaged with work in the Railways. Neamatpur have a police station though there is an Investigation Centre present.

== Educational institutions ==
Narain Dangal Rashtriya Vidyalaya Higher Secondary School, the Belrui N.G. Institution and Jaladhi Kumari Devi Uchcha Balika Bidyalaya are the three most renowned schools in and around Neamatpur. These three schools have produced many board exam Toppers in the Asansol region. The Nearest English Medium Schools are St. Patrick's Higher Secondary School, St. Vincent's High and Technical School, Loreto Convent, Asansol and The Assembly of God Church School, Sodepur. There is also Priyadarshini Public School nearby to Neamatpur. Narain Dangal Rashtriya Vidhyalaya Higher Secondary School present in Sitarampur is a renowned Hindi Medium school on the area. There is also an Urdu Medium School for girls "Islamia Girls Junior High School" is at Islamia School road, near Jama Masjid in Neamatpur (East).

There is an old primary school in the midst of the locality named "Kalidasi Vidyabithi" which is now upgraded to middle school stage.

== Demographics ==
It mainly consists of Bengali, Punjabi, Gujarati, Marwari, Hindi and Urdu-speaking people from West Bengal, Bihar, Uttar Pradesh and Jharkhand.

== Transport ==
Road connectivity to Neamatpur is provided by the Grand Trunk Road. Which is Called Lifeline of Neamatpur, One can go to Kolkata, Durgapur and Dhanbad easily, travelling by the Grand Trunk Road. One can also go to Purulia via Dishergarh and to Chittaranjan through the State Highway to Purulia and the Chittaranjan Road respectively.

Regular minibus services are available from Asansol City Bus Terminus, Barakar, Chittaranjan and Dishergarh. All the minibuses stop at Neamatpur. Some Express and Long Distance Government Buses also provide a stoppage at Neamatpur. Inter-state superfast buses plying to Dhanbad, Bokaro Steel City, Ranchi, Jamshedpur, Giridih and Madhupur also stop at Neamatpur. Direct bus connectivity to Kolkata is provided by South Bengal State Transport Corporation buses plying from Barakar, Chittaranjan and Purulia, else one can easily go to Asansol City Bus Terminus and avail bus services.

The nearest Railway Station is the Sitarampur Junction. The Howrah-Delhi rail track separates into the Main and Grand Chord lines at Sitarampur and rejoins at Mughalsarai. Hence many important trains on the Howrah - Delhi passes through and have stoppages at Sitarampur.

A wide two-way highway has been built connecting G.T. Road Neamatpur to IISCO Burnpur and in near future it should be extended to NH2. Two ponds named Banka and KamarBandh are also situated in the bank of this highway. An ancient Maa Kali temple is situated in the west of the neighborhood. The oldest Mosque is the jama masjid (congregational mosque) situated at Islamia School Road, And an Oldest Madarsa Hanfiah Tajwid ul Quran situated at G.T. Road Neamatpur, east of the neighbourhood.

== Healthcare ==
Medical facilities (dispensaries) in the Sodepur Area of ECL are available at Chinakuri I & II (PO Sundarchak), Chinakuri Mine III (PO Radhanagar), Parbelia (PO Neturia), Narsamuda (PO Mithani), Bejdih (PO Kulti), Mithani (PO Mithani), Patmohna (PO Patmohna), Sodepur 9/10 (PO Sundarchak), Mouthdih (PO Sundarchak), Dhemo Main (PO Main Dhemo).
