= Kalla, Asansol =

Kalla
- Neighbourhood in Asansol
- Location in West Bengal, India Kalla (India)
- Coordinates: 23.701889°N 86.996644°E
- Country: India
- State: West Bengal
- District: Paschim Bardhaman
- City: Asansol
- Municipal Corporation: Asansol Municipal Corporation
- AMC ward: Ward No. 15

Languages*
  - Official: Bengali, Hindi, English
- Time zone: UTC+5:30 (IST)
- PIN: 713340
- Telephone code: 91 341
- Lok Sabha constituency: Asansol
- Vidhan Sabha constituency: Asansol Uttar
- Website: paschimbardhaman.co.in

Kalla is a neighbourhood in Asansol of Paschim Bardhaman district in the Indian state of West Bengal. It is governed by Asansol Municipal Corporation

== Geography ==
Cities, towns and ECL Areas in the western portion of Asansol Sadar subdivision in Paschim Bardhaman district
MC: municipal corporation, P: rural administrative centre, CT: census town, N: neighbourhood, OG: out growth, T: temple
Owing to space constraints in the small map, the actual locations in a larger map may vary slightly

=== Location ===
Kalla is located at 23.701889°N 86.996644°E.

*For language details see Salanpur (community development block)#Language and religion

=== Urbanisation ===
In the 2011 census, 83.33% of the population of Asansol Sadar subdivision was urban and 16.67% was rural. In 2015, the municipal areas of Kulti, Raniganj and Jamuria were included within the jurisdiction of Asansol Municipal Corporation. Asansol Sadar subdivision has 26 (+1 partly) Census Towns.(partly presented in the map alongside; all places marked on the map are linked in the full-screen map).

== Transport ==
ECL Central Hospital is located on Domohani Road and is near National Highway 19.

== Healthcare ==
The Central Hospital of Eastern Coalfields at Kalla functions with 450 beds.
