= Asansol Municipal Corporation =

Local civic body in Asansol, West Bengal, India

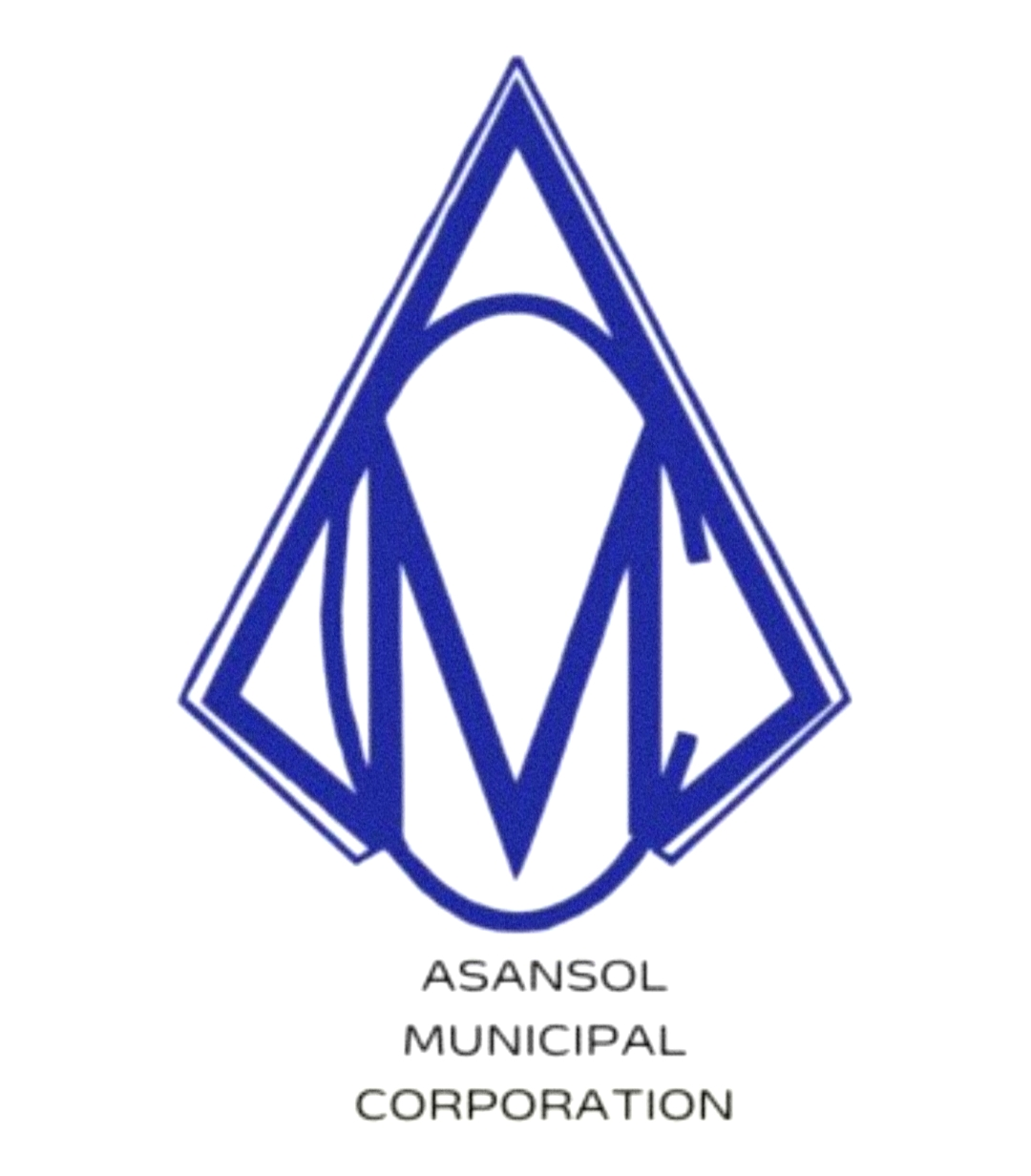
- Seal of the Asansol Municipal Corporation

Type
- Type: Municipal Corporation
- Term limits: 5 years

History
- Founded: 1994; 32 years ago

Leadership
- Mayor: Bidhan Upadhyay, MAITC since 19 February 2022
- Deputy Mayor: Abhijeet Ghatak, MAITC since 19 February 2022
- Deputy Mayor: Wasim Ul Haque, MAITC since 19 February 2022
- Chairperson: Amarnath Chatterjee, MAITC since 19 February 2022

Structure
- Seats: 106
- Political groups: Government (91): MAITC (91); Opposition (15): BJP (7); INC (3); CPI(M) (2); IND (3)

Elections
- Voting system: First past the post
- Last election: 12 February 2022
- Next election: February 2027

Meeting place
- Headquarters of the Asansol Municipal Corporation

Website
- asansolmunicipalcorporation.net

Asansol Municipal Corporation (AMC) is the civic body that governs Asansol in Asansol Sadar subdivision of Paschim Bardhaman district, West Bengal, India.

== History ==
Union Committees were established in Asansol, Raniganj, Katwa and Kalna, according to a notification issued on 29 October 1850. These Union Committees carried out the functions of municipalities. Asensole (now Asansol) Municipality was established on 1 July 1885, according to a notification dated 23 April 1885. Initially, the municipality covered the Railway Colony, the English area, Budhdanga village, Bastin’s Bazar, Pucca Bazar, Munshi Bazar, and Talpukur Chati areas. The first committee was formed with seven government officials as ex-officio members and twelve nominated members.

Over the years, Asansol experienced considerable growth due to coal mining, railway development, and the establishment of IISCO’s steel plant at Burnpur. Asansol municipal corporation was formed in 1994, with the addition of Burnpur Notified Area Authority, some rural parts of Asansol community development block, and some colliery areas.

According to the Kolkata Gazette notification of 3 June 2015, the municipal areas of Kulti, Raniganj and Jamuria were included within the jurisdiction of Asansol Municipal Corporation. As of now, Asansol Municipal Corporation administers an area of 326 km^{2} (126 sq mi).

== Geography ==
The mouzas included in Asansol Municipal Corporation, as per 2015 Gazette notification, were as follows:

The Asansol Municipal Corporation Jurisdiction Map

- Jamuria: Jhila, Shibpur, Nandi, Damodarpur, Jamuria, Kaithi, Pariharpur, Sripur, Kundlia, Joba, Khokula, Ninga, Chanda, Bogra, Banali, Mithapur, Satgram, Katagora, Bijpur, Balanpur, Mandalpur, Ikra, Sekpur, Mamudpur and Sarthakpur.
- Raniganj: Raniganj, Searsole, Amrasota, Ronal, Kumar Bazar and Mangalpur.
- Kulti: Debipur, Duburdi, Indkata, Damagoria, Jamaldi, Chanpatria, Digari, Sabanpur, Baria, Lalbazar, Ramnagar, Manberia, Balitora, Kendua, Petna, Kulti, Lachmanpur, Rampur, Calbalpur, Dedi, Kultora, Pupuri, Badirachak, Mahutdi, Shipur, Kuldi, Namagarapara, Gangutia, Raydi, Barakar, Chungaria, Mahatadi, Boldi, Narayanchak, Hatinal, Para, Jasaldi, Sanctoria, Dishergarh, Shitalpur, Manoharchak, Chota Demua, Sodepur, Radhanagar, Asanbani, Bhanrra, Kalikapur, Sitarampur, Belrui, Lachipur, Kumardiha, Neamatpur, Bamundiha, Alladi, Mithani, Kamalpur, Henrelgaria, Bejdi, Paidi and Chinakuri.

Amongst the collieries in Asansol Municipal Corporation are: Damra, Ajay Second, Khusadanga, Girmint, Kakor Danga, C.M. Ghushik, 3 No. Ghushik, Mohishila Hattola, Narshamuda, Dhemomain and K.D. Sim.

== Demographics ==
The 2011 Census of India was carried out well before the reorganisation of Asansol Municipal Corporation in 2015. Census data for the area, which is part of Asansol Municipal Corporation since 2015, is given below:

Name	Total Population	Male Population % of Total	Female Population % of Total	Population above 6 years	Total Literates	Literates as % of Population above 6 years
Asansol municipal corporation	563,917	52%	48%	503,734	419,591	83.30%
Jamuria municipality	145,276	52%	48%	126,278	90,854	71.95%
Raniganj municipality	129,441	52%	48%	113,720	88,299	77.65%
Kulti municipality	313,809	52%	48%	278,424	209,952	75.41%
Total	1,152,443	52%	48%	1,022,156	808,696	79.12%

=== Asansol urban agglomeration ===
Asansol UA historic population growth
Year	Pop.	±%
1901	30,747	—
1911	37,416	+21.7%
1921	41,035	+9.7%
1931	64,973	+58.3%
1941	121,508	+87.0%
1951	182,104	+49.9%
1961	286,539	+57.3%
1971	370,800	+29.4%
1981	628,991	+69.6%
1991	938,067	+49.1%
2001	1,067,369	+13.8%
2011	1,243,414	+16.5%
Source: Census of India

As of the 2011 census, the urban agglomeration (UA) centred upon Asansol had a population of 1,243,414. In addition to the erstwhile municipalities of Kulti, Jamuria, and Raniganj subsequently incorporated into the AMC, the agglomeration included the census towns of Amkula, Baktarnagar, Ballavpur, Bhanowara, Domohani, Egara, Jemari, Majiara, Murgathaul, Raghunathchak, Sahebganj and Topsi, and also Charanpur, an outgrowth of Jamuria.

This urban agglomeration was rated the second most populous in West Bengal (after Kolkata), and the 39th most populous in India. The expanding Asansol UA has been listed by a European research institute as the eleventh fastest growing urban area in India, and the 42nd fastest growing in the world.

== Elections ==
All India Trinamool Congress swept the first election after expansion of Asansol Municipal Corporation, held in 2015.

== Boroughs ==
Borough No	Location	Wards	Name of Chairman	Party
1	Jamuria	1,2,3,4,5,6,7,8,9,10,11,12	Sk Sandar	AITMC
2	Raniganj	32,33,34,35,36,37,88,89,90,91,92,93	Mozammil Hussain	TMC
3	Railpar, Asansol	13,14,15,24,25,26,27,28,29,30,31		
4	Sukanta Maidan, SB Gorai Road, Asansol	40,41,42,43,44,45,46,47,48,49		
5	BNR More, G.T. Road	20,21,22,23,50,51,52,53,54,55,76		
6	Kalipahari	38,39,80,82,83,84,85,86,87		
7	Tribeni More, Burnpur	56,57,75,77,78,79,81,94,95,96,97,98,106		
8	Kulti	16,18,19,58,59,60,61,73,74,99		
9	Kulti	67,69,72,100,101,102,103,104,105		
10	Kulti	17,62,63,64,65,66,68,70,71		

== Wards ==
Details of wards are as follows:

Ward No	Vidhan Sabha	Police Station	Neighbourhood^{1}	Total Electors	Seat Type	Councillor	Party
1	Jamuria	Jamuria	Nandi	8,372	None	Mridul Chakraborty	AITC
2	Jamuria	Jamuria	Jamuria Hat	9,256	Women	Shrabani Mandal	AITC
3	Jamuria	Jamuria	Sripur	8,689	None	Abdul House	AITC
4	Jamuria	Jamuria	Jamuria Hat	10,157	None	Sk Sandar	AITC
5	Jamuria	Jamuria	Jamuria Hat	8,764	Women	Bandana Ruidas	AITC
6	Jamuria	Jamuria	Jamuria Hat	10,006	None	Sanjoy Kumar Banerjee	AITC
7	Jamuria	Jamuria	Jamuria Hat	9,346	SC	Susmita Bauri	AITC
8	Jamuria	Jamuria	Satgram	9,355	None	Subrata Adhikary	AITC
9	Jamuria	Jamuria	Jamuria Hat	7,804	SC Women	Baishakhi Bauri	AITC
10	Jamuria	Jamuria	Sripur	8,711	Women	Usha Paswan	AITC
11	Jamuria	Jamuria	Sripur	8,219	None	Md Arif Ali	AITC
12	Jamuria	Jamuria	Sripur	8,498	None	Samarjit Goswami	AITC
13	Asansol Uttar	Asansol North	Dhadka	9,537	Women	Rina Mukherjee	AITC
14	Asansol Uttar	Asansol North	Majiara	10,540	None	Utpal Singha	AITC
15	Asansol Uttar	Asansol North	Kalla	9,801	None	Shyam Saren	AITC
16	Kulti	Kulti	Debipur	7,122	Women	Moonmoon Mukherjee	AITC
17	Kulti	Kulti	Boria	9,682	SC	Lalan Mehra	BJP
18	Kulti	Kulti	Sitarampur	8,243	None	Amit Kumar Tulsyan	BJP
19	Kulti	Kulti	Neamatpur	8,101	SC	Usha Kumari Rajak	AITC
20	Asansol Uttar	Asansol North	Kanyapur	7,258	None	Arjun Maji	AITC
21	Asansol Uttar	Asansol North	Kalyanpur Housing Estate	8,492	Women	Shraboni Mondal	AITC
22	Asansol Uttar	Asansol North	Kalyanpur Housing Estate	9,061	None	Anirban Das	AITC
23	Asansol Uttar	Asansol North	Kalyanpur Housing Estate	8,198	None	CK Reshma Ramakrishnan	AITC
24	Asansol Uttar	Asansol North	Quraishi Mahalla	10,732	Women	Fansabi Begum	AITC
25	Asansol Uttar	Asansol North	Quraishi Mahalla	13,991	None	SM Mustafa	INC
26	Asansol Uttar	Asansol North	Railpar	10,312	None	Md Wasimul Haque	AITC
27	Asansol Uttar	Asansol North	Railpar	7,721	Women	Chaitali Tiwari	BJP
28	Asansol Uttar	Asansol North	Railpar	7,551	None	Ghulam Sarwar	INC
29	Asansol Uttar	Asansol North	Railpar	7,035	None	Gourab Gupta	BJP
30	Asansol Uttar	Asansol North	Railpar	9,167	SC Women	Gopa Roy	AITC
31	Asansol Uttar	Asansol North	Railpar	7,894	Women	Asha Prasad	AITC
32	Jamuria	Jamuria	Jamuria Hat	6,795	SC	Bhola Kumar Hela	AITC
33	Raniganj	Raniganj	Searsole	8,649	None	Naran Bauri	CPI(M)
34	Raniganj	Raniganj	Searsole	11,583	None	Ranjit Singh	AITC
35	Raniganj	Raniganj	Ronai Haji Para	9,014	Women	Akhtari Khatoon	AITC
36	Raniganj	Raniganj	Searsole	9,816	SC	Dibyendu Bhakat	AITC
37	Raniganj	Raniganj	Damoda Colliery	8,290	None	Rupesh Kumar Yadav	AITC
38	Asansol Dakshin	Asansol North	Ushagram	8,823	ST Women	Meena Kumari Hansda	AITC
39	Asansol Dakshin	Asansol North	Ushagram	8,664	None	Jyoti Sankar Karmakar	AITC
40	Asansol Uttar	Asansol North	Ushagram	8,209	Women	Moumita Biswas	AITC
41	Asansol Uttar	Asansol North	Nuruddin Road	8,858	Women	Ranbir Singh Bharara	AITC
42	Asansol Uttar	Asansol North	Old Hospital	8,800	None	Dr Amitava Basu	AITC
43	Asansol Uttar	Asansol North	Old Hospital	9,116	Women	Amna Khatoon	CPI(M)
44	Asansol Uttar	Asansol North	Subdivisional Hospital	7,118	None	Amarnath Chatterjee	AITC
45	Asansol Uttar	Asansol North	Asansol Village	6,677	None	Utpal Ray	AITC
46	Asansol Uttar	Asansol South	Hutton Road	7,642	Women	Shikha Ghatak	AITC
47	Asansol Uttar	Asansol South	Master Para	8,405	None	Rajesh Tiwari	AITC
48	Asansol Uttar	Asansol South	Budha	8,823	None	Gurudas Chatterjee	AITC
49	Asansol Uttar	Asansol South	Chelidanga	8,182	Women	Shampa Dawn	AITC
50	Asansol Uttar	Asansol South	Chelidanga, Hill View Park	8,745	None	Abhijit Ghatak	AITC
51	Asansol Uttar	Asansol South	Sree Pally	8,055	None	Ananta Majumdar	AITC
52	Asansol Uttar	Asansol South	Court Morh	6,483	Women	Mousumi Bose	AITC
53	Asansol Uttar	Asansol South	Burnpur Road Morh	7,083	None	Tapan Banerjee	AITC
54	Asansol Uttar	Asansol South	Sarada Pally Road	7,099	SC	Dilip Baral	AITC
55	Asansol Uttar	Asansol South	Gopalpur New Colony	9,357	None	Dipa Chakraborty	AITC
56	Asansol Dakshin	Asansol South	Rabindranagar	9,443	Women	Shrabani Biswas	AITC
57	Asansol Dakshin	Asansol South	Narsamuda	11,437	SC	Samit Maji	AITC
58	Kulti	Asansol South	Dhemo Main Colliery	9,068	None	Sanjay Nonia	AITC
59	Kulti	Kulti	Neamatpur	11,552	None	Md Zakir Hussain	INC
60	Kulti	Kulti	Neamatpur	8,942	Women	Indrani Mishra	AITC
61	Kulti	Kulti	Neamatpur	8,536	None	Adinath Puitandi	AITC
62	Kulti	Kulti	Upper Kulti	8,807	None	Khoma Mondal	AITC
63	Kulti	Kulti	Upper Kulti	88,51	None	Md Salim Akhtar Ansari	AITC
64	Kulti	Kulti	Kulti Town	8,636	Women	Poonam Devi	AITC
65	Kulti	Kulti	Upper Kulti	8,997	None	Nadim Akhtar	IND
66	Kulti	Kulti	Barakar	9,885	None	Ashok Kumar Paswan	AITC
67	Kulti	Kulti	Barakar	8,029	Women	Tumpa Chowdhary	IND
68	Kulti	Kulti	Barakar	8,333	None	Radha Singh	IND
69	Kulti	Kulti	Barakar	9,234	None	Sushanta Mandal	BJP
70	Kulti	Kulti	Kendwa	8,824	SC	Wakil Das	AITC
71	Kulti	Kulti	Simulgram	7,963	Women	Satabdi Bhandari	AITC
72	Kulti	Kulti	Gangutia	11,040	SC	Chaitanya Majhi	AITC
73	Kulti	Kulti	Bejdih Colliery	8,163	SC Women	Sunita Bauri	AITC
74	Kulti	Kulti	Mithani	8,135	None	Ujjal Chatterjee	AITC
75	Asansol Dakshin	Hirapur	Chhotodighari, New Town	8,660	None	Kanchan Mukherjee	AITC
76	Asansol Uttar	Hirapur	Bidhan Pally, Hill View Park	9,731	Women	Babita Das	AITC
77	Asansol Dakshin	Hirapur	Narsighbandh	11,643	None	Gurmit Singh	AITC
78	Asansol Dakshin	Hirapur	Burnpur	6,950	None	Ashok Rudra	AITC
79	Asansol Dakshin	Hirapur	Subhaspally	7,099	Women	Sima Mondal	AITC
80	Asansol Dakshin	Hirapur	Santinagar, Puraniya Talao	8,733	None	Rakesh Sharma	AITC
81	Asansol Dakshin	Hirapur	Puranahat	8,751	None	Sona Gupta	AITC
82	Asansol Dakshin	Hirapur	Rahmatnagar	10,079	Women	Nargis Bano Begum	AITC
83	Asansol Dakshin	Asansol South	Mohisila Colony	10,523	None	Md Hasratullah	AITC
84	Asansol Dakshin	Asansol South	Ismail	9,586	None	Dr Debashish Sarkar	AITC
85	Asansol Dakshin	Asansol South	Mohisila Colony	11,718	Women	Kalyani Ray	AITC
86	Asansol Dakshin	Asansol South	Talkuri	9,414	None	Manas Das	AITC
87	Asansol Dakshin	Asansol South	Damra	8,191	None	Tarun Chakraborty	AITC
88	Raniganj	Raniganj	Raniganj Town	10,064	Women	Neha Shaw	AITC
89	Raniganj	Raniganj	Raniganj Town	9,434	None	Md Mozammil Hussain	AITC
90	Raniganj	Raniganj	Raniganj Town	6,276	SC	Shakti Ruidas	AITC
91	Raniganj	Raniganj	Raniganj Town	10,325	None	Raju Singh	AITC
92	Raniganj	Raniganj	Raniganj Town	5,937	Women	Shyama Upadhyay	AITC
93	Raniganj	Raniganj	Raniganj Town	11,057	None	Alok Bose	AITC
94	Asansol Dakshin	Hirapur	Kalajharia	7,443	ST	Ganesh Orang	AITC
95	Asansol Dakshin	Hirapur	Riverside Township	12,452	SC	Sandhya Das	AITC
96	Asansol Dakshin	Hirapur	Burnpur Town, Hirapur Village	10,390	SC	Shibananda Bauri	AITC
97	Asansol Dakshin	Hirapur	Purushattompur, Kuilapur	6,813	None	Anup Maji	AITC
98	Asansol Dakshin	Hirapur	Dharampur, Suryanagar, Dihika	9,927	Women	Kahkashan Reyaz	AITC
99	Kulti	Hirapur	Bidyanandapur	7,452	ST	Rabilal Hembram	AITC
100	Kulti	Kulti	Chinakuri	10,680	None	Haldar Karmakar	AITC
101	Kulti	Kulti	Chhoto Dhemo	9,416	ST Women	Sabita Tudu	AITC
102	Kulti	Kulti	Radhanagar	9,987	None	Sourav Maji	AITC
103	Kulti	Kulti	Dishergarh(Hatinol, Rokta, Josaidi Villages)	7,027	SC	Tarak Nath Dhibar	AITC
104	Kulti	Kulti	Dishergarh(Sanctoria Village)	8,878	SC	Anjan Mondal	AITC
105	Kulti	Kulti	Dishergarh Village and Town	9,544	Women	Indrani Acharya	BJP
106	Asansol Dakshin	Hirapur	Hirapur Village, Shamdi	6,134	None	Akshay Ghosh	AITC

1 This is a broad indication of the neighbourhood covered, not a full description

== See also ==
- Durgapur Municipal Corporation
