= Searsole Raj High School =

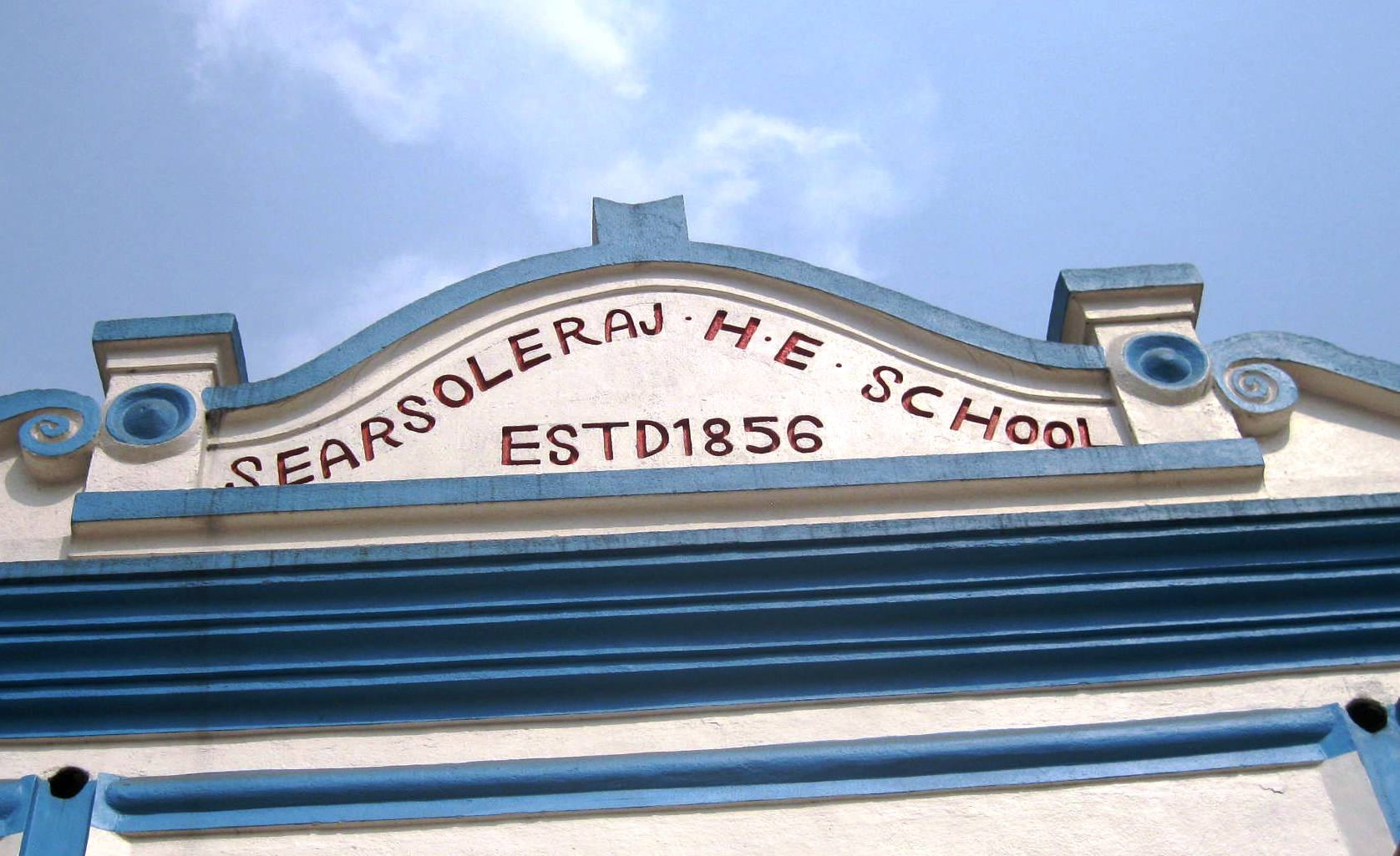
- Searsole Raj High School

Location
- Dr R R Rd; Raniganj, West Bengal, 713347; India; 23.6190°N 87.1145°E

Information
- Established: 1856
- Gender: Co-Ed
- Campus type: Urban

Searsole Raj High School is a high school located in Raniganj, West Bengal, India. Its alumni include Kazi Nazrul Islam, national poet of Bangladesh. It is a Bengali-medium boys-only institution established in 1856. It has facilities for teaching from class V to class XII. The school has a library with 3,981 books and a playground.

== Our School — A Pride of Heritage ==
Searsole Raj High School was established in 1856. The ancient Heritage Building of the school references its historical importance. The heritage of the school is a source of pride for its students as they try to continue the legacy and reputation of the institution.

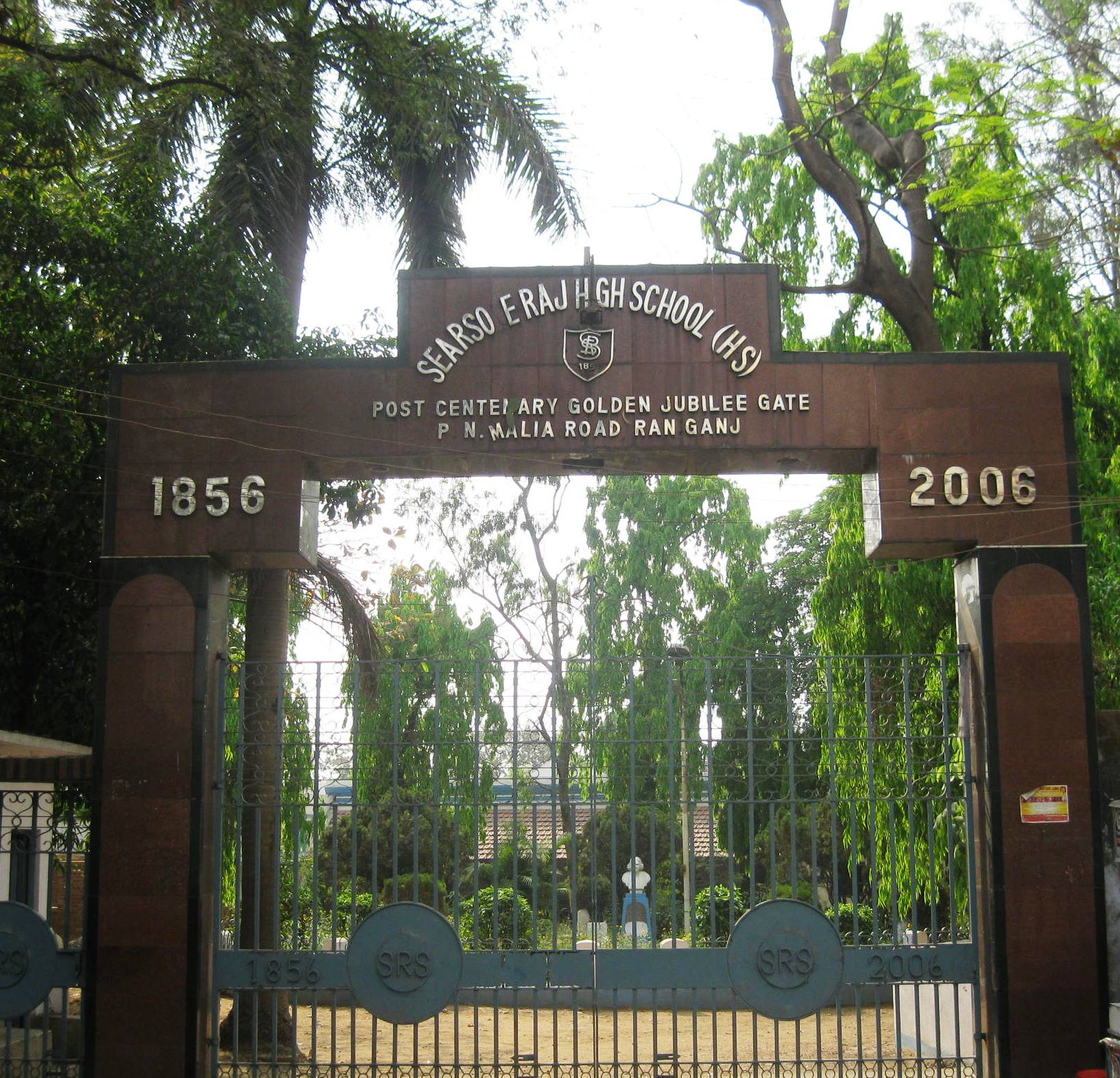
Searsole Raj High School main gate

== See also ==
- Education in India
- List of schools in India
- Education in West Bengal
