= 2022 Asansol Municipal Corporation election =

Election to Asansol Municipal Corporation, 2022

- 12 February 2022

All 106 seats in Asansol Municipal Corporation 54 seats needed for a majority
- Turnout: 73.21%

| | First party | Second party | Third party |
|---|---|---|---|
| Leader | Bidhan Upadhyay | Jitendra Tiwari | None |
| Party | AITC | BJP | CPI(M) |
| Last election | 76 seats | 8 seats | 14 seats |
| Seats won | 91 seats | 7 seats | 2 seats |
| Seat change | 15 ▲ | 1 ▼ | 12 ▼ |
| Percentage | 85.85% | 6.6% | 1.89% |
| | Fourth party | Fifth party |
| Leader | None |
| Party | INC | Independents |
| Last election | 3 seats | 2 seats |
| Seats won | 3 seats | 2 seats |
| Seat change | – | – |
| Percentage | 2.83% | 2.83% |
Mayor before election
Jitendra Tiwari
AITC
Elected mayor
Bidhan Upadhyay
AITC

The 2022 Asansol Municipal Corporation election was held on 12 February 2022 to elect 106 members of the Asansol Municipal Corporation (AMC) which governs Asansol, the 2nd largest city of the Indian state of West Bengal in the district of Paschim Bardhaman.

== Schedule ==
| Poll event | Schedule |
|---|---|
| Notification date | 28 December 2021 |
| Last Date for filing nomination | 3 January 2022 |
| Last Date for withdrawal of nomination | 6 January 2022 |
| Date of poll | 12 February 2022 |
| Date of counting of votes | 14 February 2022 |

== Parties and alliances ==
Following is a list of political parties and alliances which contested in this election:

| Party | Symbol | Alliance | No. of contesting candidates | |
|---|---|---|---|---|
| All India Trinamool Congress (AITC) | | None | 106 | |
| Bharatiya Janata Party (BJP) | | None | 102 | |
| All India Forward Bloc (AIFB) | | None | Left Front | 15 |
| Communist Party of India (CPI) | | None | Left Front | 11 |
| Communist Party of India (Marxist) (CPI(M)) | | None | Left Front | 72 |
| Revolutionary Socialist Party (RSP) | | 6 | Left Front | |
| Indian National Congress (INC) | | 50 | | |
| Independents (IND) | | 62 | | |
| Janata Dal (United) (JDU) | | 2 | | |

== Candidates ==
List of candidates
| Ward | | Reservation | AITC | | Left Front | | BJP | | INC | |
| # | Name | SC/Women | Party | Candidate | Party | Candidate | Party | Candidate | Party | Candidate |
| 1 | Ward No. 1 | None | AITC | Mridul Chakraborty | CPI(M) | Tapas Kabi | BJP | Talababu Maddi | INC | Somnath Chatterjee |
| 2 | Ward No. 2 | Women | AITC | Shrabani Mandal | CPI(M) | Namita Das | BJP | Renu Kumari Mahato | INC supports CPI(M) | |
| 3 | Ward No. 3 | None | AITC | AB House | AIFB | Subal Chandra Nath | BJP | Chhanda Ganguli | INC | Md. Asgar Ali |
| 4 | Ward No. 4 | None | AITC | Sk. Sandar | CPI(M) | Md. Zaheer Ansari | BJP | Niranjan Singh | INC supports CPI(M) | |
| 5 | Ward No. 5 | Women | AITC | Bandana Ruidas | CPI(M) | Taniya Kabi | BJP | Sudha Devi | INC supports CPI(M) | |
| 6 | Ward No. 6 | None | AITC | Sanjoy Kumar Mukherjee | CPI(M) | Dilip Bauri | BJP | Sudan Ruidas | INC supports CPI(M) | |
| 7 | Ward No. 7 | SC | AITC | Susmita Bauri | CPI(M) | Sima Bauri | BJP | Mithu Maji | INC supports CPI(M) | |
| 8 | Ward No. 8 | None | AITC | Sri Subrata Adhikary | CPI(M) | Sanjoy Chatterjee | BJP | Malay Chakraborty | INC supports CPI(M) | |
| 9 | Ward No. 9 | SC Women | AITC | Baishakhi Bouri | CPI(M) | Dhararani Bouri | BJP | Pratima Bouri | INC supports CPI(M) | |
| 10 | Ward No. 10 | Women | AITC | Usha Paswan | CPI(M) | Anjali Devi | BJP | Rubi Singh | INC | Monidwipa Chatterjee |
| 11 | Ward No. 11 | None | AITC | Md Arif Ali | CPI(M) | Md Sabbir Hussain | BJP | Sunil Kumar Singh | INC | Md Alam |
| 12 | Ward No. 12 | None | AITC | Samarjit Goswami | CPI(M) | Dayamoy Bauri | BJP | Kartik Dhibar | INC | Ansari Md Ishtiaque |
| 13 | Ward No. 13 | Women | AITC | Rina Mukherjee | CPI(M) | Priyanka Das | BJP | Jayanti Ruidas | INC supports CPI(M) | |
| 14 | Ward No. 14 | None | AITC | Utpal Singha | CPI(M) | Pradip Kumar Sarkar | BJP | Subhasish Biswas | INC supports CPI(M) | |
| 15 | Ward No. 15 | None | AITC | Shyam Saren | AIFB | Trilochan Roy | BJP | Adarsh Sharma | INC | Manab Kumar Roy |
| 16 | Ward No. 16 | Women | AITC | Moonmoon Mukherjee | CPI | Dalli Ray | BJP | Chandana Das | INC supports CPI(M) | |
| 17 | Ward No. 17 | SC | AITC | Reena Kumari Prasad | AIFB | Pintu Hela | BJP | Lalan Mehra | INC supports AIFB | |
| 18 | Ward No. 18 | None | AITC | Tapan Mondal | CPI(M) | Subodh Hari | BJP | Amit Kumar Tulsyan | INC supports CPI(M) | |
| 19 | Ward No. 19 | SC | AITC | Usha Kumari Rajak | CPI(M) | Jagarnath Paswan | BJP | Ram Bouri | INC | Sukanta Das |
| 20 | Ward No. 20 | None | AITC | Arun Maji | CPI(M) | Suresh Bauri | BJP | Prasenjit Mondal | INC supports CPI(M) | |
| 21 | Ward No. 21 | Women | AITC | Shraboni Mondal | CPI | Chhabi Bhattacharya | BJP | Nanda Wheeler | INC supports CPI | |
| 22 | Ward No. 22 | None | AITC | Anirban Das(Animesh) | CPI(M) | Trilok Goswami | BJP | Subhasis Das(Kartick) | INC | Srilata Banerjee |
| 23 | Ward No. 23 | None | AITC | C.K. Reshma Radhakrishnan | AIFB | Md Nazrul | Didn't Field Candidate | | INC | Haider Imam Ansari |
| 24 | Ward No. 24 | Women | AITC | Fansabi Begum(Alia) | CPI(M) | Shabana Khatoon | BJP | Krishna Nandi | INC | Shahina Parween |
| 25 | Ward No. 25 | None | AITC | Md Nasim Ansari | CPI(M) | Md Aftab Alam | Didn't Field Candidate | | INC | S.M. Mustafa |
| 26 | Ward No. 26 | None | AITC | Md. Wasimul Haque | CPI(M) | Md Iftekar | Didn't Field Candidate | | INC | Md. Azad |
| 27 | Ward No. 27 | Women | AITC | Rita Biswas | CPI | Soma Roy | BJP | Chaitali Tiwari | INC supports CPI | |
| 28 | Ward No. 28 | None | AITC | Md Irshad Alam | AIFB | Md Israil | BJP | Md Islam | INC | Ghulam Sarwar |
| 29 | Ward No. 29 | None | AITC | kabita Yadav | CPI | Hemant Mishra | BJP | Gourab Gupta | INC | Md. Shahbuddin |
| 30 | Ward No. 30 | SC Women | AITC | Gopa Roy | CPI(M) | Ranu Chanda | BJP | Bina Adhikari | INC | Mili Mazumder |
| 31 | Ward No. 31 | Women | AITC | Asha Prasad | CPI(M) | Tanushree Roy | BJP | Rekha Kumari Sharma | INC supports CPI(M) | |
| 32 | Ward No. 32 | SC | AITC | BHola Kumar Hela | CPI | Charitar Paswan | BJP | Sadhan Maji | INC | Sukumar Maji |
| 33 | Ward No. 33 | None | AITC | Kanchan Kanti Tewary | CPI(M) | Naran Bauri | BJP | Shamsher Singh | INC | Shilanandan Jha |
| 34 | Ward No. 34 | None | AITC | Ranjit Singh | CPI(M) | Sonjoy Pramanik | BJP | Anand Kumar Shaw | INC supports CPI(M) | |
| 35 | Ward No. 35 | Women | AITC | Akhtari Khatoon | CPI(M) | Nilu Bibi | Didn't Field Candidate | | INC supports CPI(M) | |
| 36 | Ward No. 36 | SC | AITC | Dibyendu Bhakat (Sanu) | CPI(M) | Sanjay Ruidas | BJP | Radheshyam Bhakat | INC supports CPI(M) | |
| 37 | Ward No. 37 | None | AITC | Rupesh kumar Yadav | CPI(M) | Karu Thakur | BJP | Shampa Chatterjee | INC supports CPI(M) | |
| 38 | Ward No. 38 | ST Women | AITC | Meena Kumari Hansda | CPI(M) | Dolon Hembrom | BJP | Arati Munda(Kora) | INC supports CPI(M) | |
| 39 | Ward No. 39 | None | AITC | Jyoti Sankar karmakar | CPI | Prem Barma | BJP | Prabhat Kumar Mahato | INC | Shivjee Saw |
| 40 | Ward No. 40 | Women | AITC | Moumita Biswas | CPI | Sudha Sindhu Singh | BJP | Rakhi Kushwaha | INC supports CPI | |
| 41 | Ward No. 41 | Women | AITC | Ranbir Singh Bharara | CPI(M) | Jairam Sharma | BJP | Bigu Thakur | INC supports CPI(M) | |
| 42 | Ward No. 42 | None | AITC | Amitava Basu | CPI(M) | Atanu Mukherjee | BJP | Madhu Sudan Dey | INC | Arup Mukherjee |
| 43 | Ward No. 43 | Women | AITC | Rajarsi Gupta | CPI(M) | Amna Khatoon | BJP | Asha Sharma | INC supports CPI(M) | |
| 44 | Ward No. 44 | None | AITC | Amarnath Chatterjee | CPI | Amit Kumar Sharma | BJP | Sheo Prasad Burman | INC | Bishwajit Burman |
| 45 | Ward No. 45 | None | AITC | Utpal Ray | CPI(M) | Chandra Nath Roy | BJP | Manik Roy | INC | Hussain Naghma |
| 46 | Ward No. 46 | Women | AITC | Shikha Ghatak | CPI | Madhuchhanda Das | BJP | Rinku Das | INC supports CPI | |
| 47 | Ward No. 47 | None | AITC | Rajesh Tiwari | CPI(M) | Jayanta Chakrabarty | BJP | Indranil Ghosh | INC supports CPI(M) | |
| 48 | Ward No. 48 | None | AITC | Gurudas Chatterjee | CPI(M) | Victor Acharjee | BJP | Pijush Kanti Goswami | INC supports CPI(M) | |
| 49 | Ward No. 49 | Women | AITC | Shampa Dawn | CPI(M) | Annanya Dawn Chakraborty | BJP | Priya Konar | INC supports CPI(M) | |
| 50 | Ward No. 50 | None | AITC | Abhijit Ghatak | CPI(M) | Ramjee Dubey | BJP | Raja Mukherjee | INC supports CPI(M) | |
| 51 | Ward No. 51 | None | AITC | Ananta Majumdar | CPI(M) | Prakash Das | BJP | Hemanta mandal | INC | Kanchan Dey |
| 52 | Ward No. 52 | Women | AITC | Mousumi Bose | RSP | Suchitra Gupta | BJP | Upasana Upadhyay | INC | Tapati Mukherjee |
| 53 | Ward No. 53 | None | AITC | Tapan Banerjee | CPI(M) | Hare Krishna Aich | BJP | Debrabata Ghosh | INC | Kajal Banerjee |
| 54 | Ward No. 54 | SC | AITC | Dilip Baral | RSP | Arun Maji | BJP | Dinesh Kumar Lal | INC supports RSP | |
| 55 | Ward No. 55 | None | AITC | Dipa Chakraborty | CPI(M) | Anil Kumar Jha | BJP | Sudip Guha Roy | INC supports CPI(M) | |
| 56 | Ward No. 56 | Women | AITC | Shrabani Biswas | RSP | Ranu Bag | BJP | Ragini Singh | INC | Pampa Chatterjee |
| 57 | Ward No. 57 | SC | AITC | Samit Maji | CPI(M) | Aditya Maji | BJP | Amar Bauri | INC supports CPI(M) | |
| 58 | Ward No. 58 | None | AITC | Sanjay Nonia | CPI | Tapan Bouri | BJP | Aloke Maji | INC | Ravi Prasad |
| 59 | Ward No. 59 | None | AITC | Kanchan Roy | AIFB | Md Salauddin Ansari | BJP | Goutam Chakraborty | INC | Md Zakir Hussain |
| 60 | Ward No. 60 | Women | AITC | Indrani Mishra | AIFB | Rekha Banerjee | BJP | Shilpi Roy | INC | Manashi Mondal |
| 61 | Ward No. 61 | None | AITC | Adinath Puitandi | CPI(M) | Biru Jadab | BJP | Kanchan Sinha | INC | Bano Shahnaz |
| 62 | Ward No. 62 | None | AITC | Kshama Mandal | CPI(M) | Snigdha Mondal | BJP | Sabriti Bauri | INC supports CPI(M) | |
| 63 | Ward No. 63 | None | AITC | Md Salim Akhtar Aansari | CPI(M) | Md Aslam | BJP | Amit Kumar Keshari | INC | Hasan Imam Khan |
| 64 | Ward No. 64 | Women | AITC | Poonam Devi | AIFB | Sulata Banerjee | BJP | Madhurima Roy | INC supports AIFB | |
| 65 | Ward No. 65 | None | AITC | Md Akhtar Hussain | CPI(M) | Md Nawabuddin Khan | BJP | Jishan Quraishi | INC supports CPI(M) | |
| 66 | Ward No. 66 | None | AITC | Ashok Kumar Paswan | AIFB | Manas Pal | BJP | Rajesh Sinha | INC supports AIFB | |
| 67 | Ward No. 67 | Women | AITC | Baby Bauri | CPI(M) | Jinat Mohammed | BJP | Sunita Chourasia | INC supports CPI(M) | |
| 68 | Ward No. 68 | None | AITC | Jitendra Tewari | AIFB | Tarkeshwar Nath Singh | BJP | Raju Yadav | INC | Manoj Kumar Nonia |
| 69 | Ward No. 69 | None | AITC | Sumita Ghosh | RSP | Debrabata Adhikari | BJP | Sushanta Mandal | INC | Motilal Gupta |
| 70 | Ward No. 70 | SC | AITC | Okil Das | AIFB | Sital Bauri | BJP | Aditya Narayan Sharma | INC supports AIFB | |
| 71 | Ward No. 71 | Women | AITC | Satabdi Bhandari | CPI(M) | Basantidebi Mahato | BJP | Muni Mahato | INC supports CPI(M) | |
| 72 | Ward No. 72 | SC | AITC | Chaitannya Maji | CPI | Baidyanath Das | BJP | Somnath Maji | INC | Mala Mondal |
| 73 | Ward No. 73 | SC Women | AITC | Sunita Bouri | AIFB | Angura Bauri | BJP | Sonali Bauri | INC | Panshoki Maji |
| 74 | Ward No. 74 | None | AITC | Ujjal Chatterjee | CPI(M) | Priyabrata Sarkar | BJP | Santu Banerjee | INC | Naba Kumar Bouri |
| 75 | Ward No. 75 | None | AITC | Kanchan Mukherjee | CPI(M) | Dipali Mondal | BJP | Susama Maji Bhandari | INC supports CPI(M) | |
| 76 | Ward No. 76 | Women | AITC | Babita Das | CPI(M) | Kabita Ghosh | BJP | Supriya Mishra | INC supports CPI(M) | |
| 77 | Ward No. 77 | None | AITC | Gurmit Singh | Ind | Sunny Kumar Sah | BJP | Rajaram Singh | INC | Bonashree Dubey |
| 78 | Ward No. 78 | None | AITC | Ashok Rudra | CPI(M) | Chandan Mishra | BJP | Ujjal Sharma | INC | Ashok Banerjee |
| 79 | Ward No. 79 | Women | AITC | Sima Mondal | CPI(M) | Mina Lahiri Karmakar | BJP | Purnima Dey | INC | Laxmi Devi |
| 80 | Ward No. 80 | None | AITC | Rakesh Kumar Sharma | CPI(M) | Shantanu Chakraborty | BJP | Momendra Kumar Shaw | INC | Bamapada Bhattacharjee |
| 81 | Ward No. 81 | None | AITC | Sona Gupta | CPI(M) | Sankar Dasgupta | BJP | Sandhya Pramanik | INC | Dimpala Paul |
| 82 | Ward No. 82 | Women | AITC | Nargis Bano | RSP | Noorie Parween | BJP | Sushila Yadav | INC | Shahnaz Bano |
| 83 | Ward No. 83 | None | AITC | Md Hasratullah | RSP | Asgar Ali | BJP | Rupa Biswas Kar | INC | Shah Alam khan |
| 84 | Ward No. 84 | None | AITC | Debashis Sarkar | CPI(M) | Tanmoy Ganguly | BJP | Madhumita Chatterjee | INC | Rajesh Dutta |
| 85 | Ward No. 85 | Women | AITC | Kalyani Roy | CPI(M) | Sima Halder | BJP | Kakali Ghosh | INC supports CPI(M) | |
| 86 | Ward No. 86 | None | AITC | Manas Das | Ind | Chanda Himaghna | BJP | Tapas das | INC | Siddhartha Dey |
| 87 | Ward No. 87 | None | AITC | Tarun Chakraborty | CPI(M) | Utpal Roy | BJP | Anup Kumar Chattaraj | INC supports CPI(M) | |
| 88 | Ward No. 88 | Women | AITC | Neha Shaw | CPI(M) | Jayasree Sarkar | BJP | Sumati Mukherjee | INC supports CPI(M) | |
| 89 | Ward No. 89 | None | AITC | Md Mozammil Hussain | CPI(M) | kanez Fatma | BJP | Suresh Prasad Bhadani | INC supports CPI(M) | |
| 90 | Ward No. 90 | SC | AITC | Sakti Ruidas | CPI(M) | Magaram Bauri | BJP | Debjit Khan | INC supports CPI(M) | |
| 91 | Ward No. 91 | None | AITC | Raju Singh | CPI(M) | Kallol Ghosh | BJP | Deb Kumar Bose | INC supports CPI(M) | |
| 92 | Ward No. 92 | Women | AITC | Shyama Upadhyay | CPI(M) | Krishna Dasgupta | BJP | Sunita Kyal | INC supports CPI(M) | |
| 93 | Ward No. 93 | None | AITC | Alok Basu | CPI(M) | Monojit Bose | BJP | Dinesh Soni | INC supports CPI(M) | |
| 94 | Ward No. 94 | ST | AITC | Dilip Orang | CPI(M) | Gandhi Orang | BJP | Upinda Orang | INC supports CPI(M) | |
| 95 | Ward No. 95 | SC Women | AITC | Sandhya Das | CPI(M) | Soma Das | BJP | Rina Das | INC supports CPI(M) | |
| 96 | Ward No. 96 | SC | AITC | Shibnada Bauri | CPI(M) | Sadhan Majhi | BJP | Tumpa Bouri | INC supports CPI(M) | |
| 97 | Ward No. 97 | None | AITC | Anup Kumar Maji | CPI(M) | Kuntala Bauri | BJP | Rajendra Bouri | INC supports CPI(M) | |
| 98 | Ward No. 98 | Women | AITC | Kahkashan Reyaz | CPI(M) | Zia Aafrin | BJP | Amrawati Devi Shukla | INC | Majhbyn Khatun |
| 99 | Ward No. 99 | ST | AITC | Rabilal Tudu | CPI(M) | Bishnu Mandi | BJP | Sunil Tudu | INC supports CPI(M) | |
| 100 | Ward No. 100 | None | AITC | Haladhar Karmakar | AIFB | Prabesh Sao | BJP | Ajit Paswan | INC | Ashwini Bauri |
| 101 | Ward No. 101 | ST Women | AITC | Sabita Tudu | AIFB | Sumitra Hembram | BJP | Sorodhoni Besra | INC supports AIFB | |
| 102 | Ward No. 102 | None | AITC | Saurab Maji | CPI(M) | Samiran Ghosh | BJP | Abhijit Acharyya | INC | Anjan Maji |
| 103 | Ward No. 103 | SC | AITC | Trilochan Maji | AIFB | Laltu Thandar | BJP | Tarak nath Dhibar | INC | Rahul Bouri |
| 104 | Ward No. 104 | SC | AITC | Anjan Mondal | AIFB | Uttam Bauri | BJP | Rajib Bauri | INC | Bandhan Bouri |
| 105 | Ward No. 105 | Women | AITC | Sukla Acharjee | CPI(M) | Rubiya Zafar | BJP | Indrani Acharyya | INC | Rabani Murmu |
| 106 | Ward No. 106 | None | AITC | Akshay Ghosh | CPI(M) | Dharma Das Maji | BJP | Shiba Hansda | INC supports CPI(M) | |

== Bye-Elections ==
| Date | District | Body | Ward | Won Party | Runner Up Party | Margin |
|---|---|---|---|---|---|---|
| Aug 21 | Paschim Barddhaman | Asansol Municipal Corporation | 6 | AITC | CPI(M) | 5477 |
