= Barakar River =

River in Jharkhand and West Bengal

Coordinates: 23°42′N 86°48′E

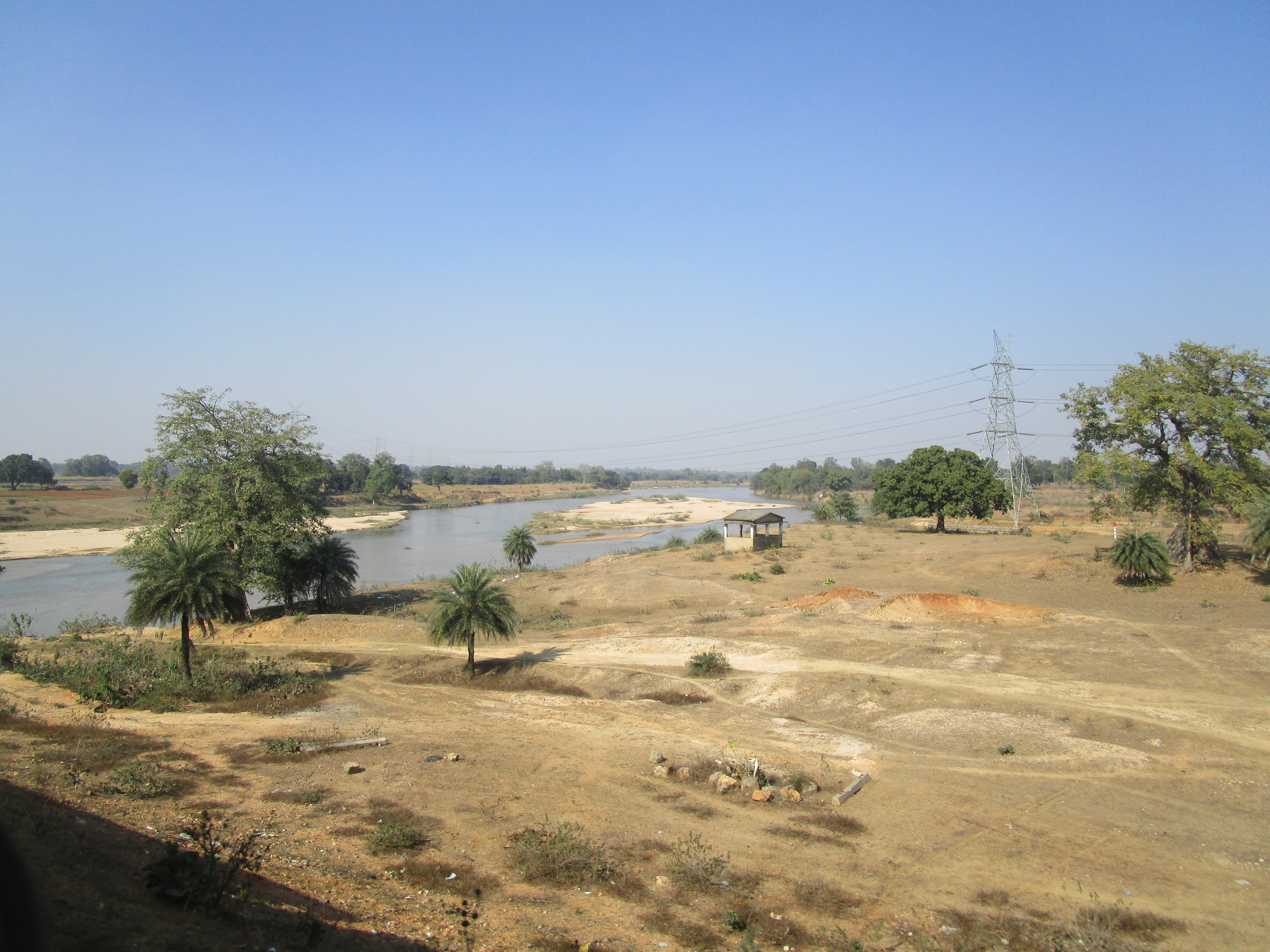
- Barakar River at Barano, Hazaribagh, Jharkhand

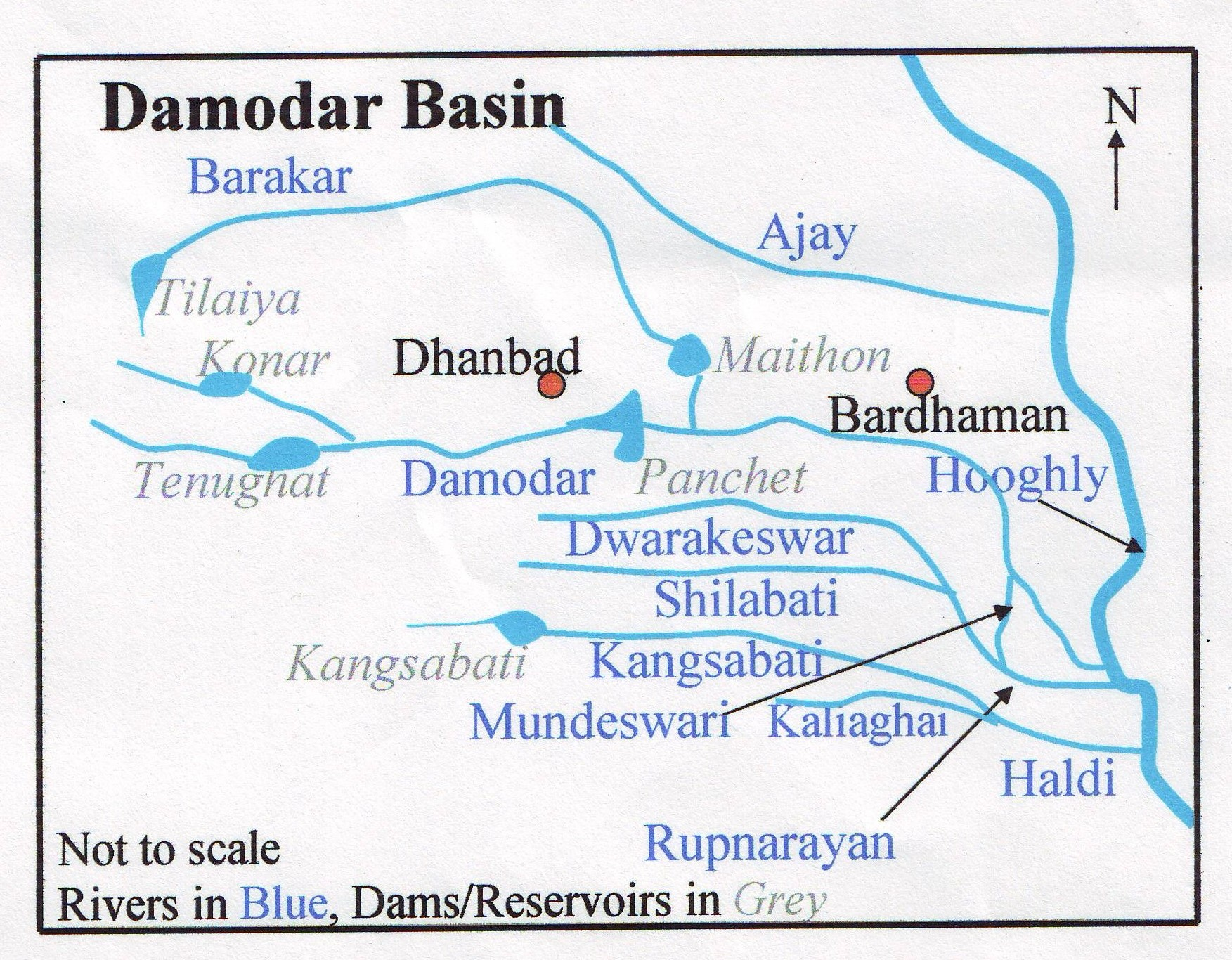

Location
- Country: India
- State: Jharkhand, West Bengal

Physical characteristics
- Source: Padma, Hazaribagh
  - location: Hazaribagh district, Chota Nagpur Plateau, Jharkhand
- Length: 256 km (159 mi)

Basin features
- Tributaries
  - left: Usri River
  - right: Barsoti River

The Barakar River is the main tributary of the Damodar River in eastern India. Originating near Padma in Hazaribagh district of Jharkhand it flows for 256 kilometres (159 mi) across the northern part of the Chota Nagpur Plateau, mostly in a west to east direction, before joining the Damodar near Dishergarh in Asansol, Bardhaman district of West Bengal. It has a catchment area of 6,159 square kilometres (2,378 mi^{2}). Its main tributaries Barsoti and Usri flow in from the south and north, respectively. Apart from the two main tributaries, some 15 medium or small streams also join it.

The Barakar skirts the northern portion of Parasnath Hills, 1,350 metres (4,430 ft) above sea level, the highest hill in the region, located in Giridih district of Jharkhand and a centre of Jain pilgrimage. Barakar Rivers forms the boundary between West Bengal & Bihar (now Jharkhand).

== Floods ==
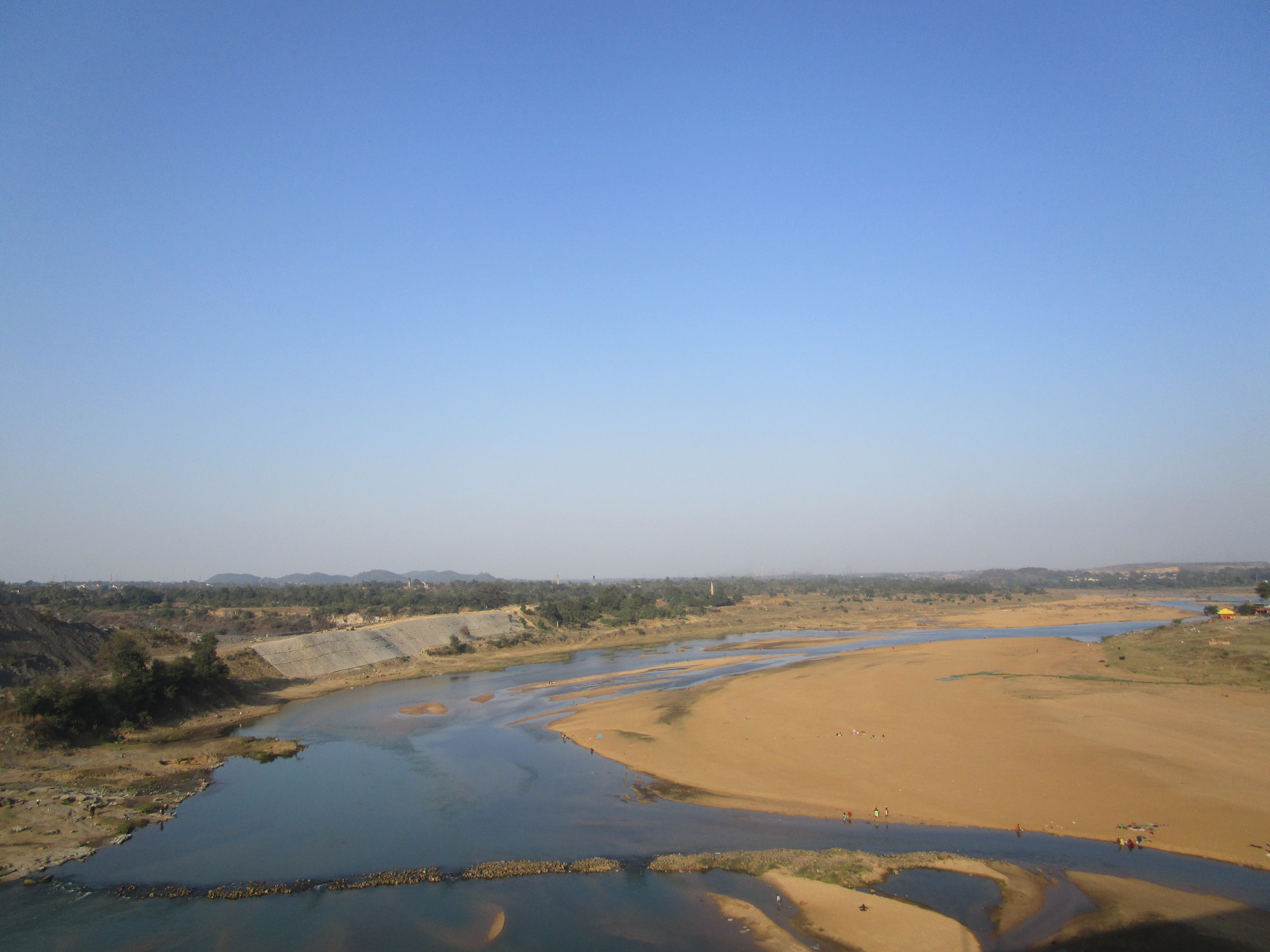
Barakar River at Barakar, Asansol, Bardhaman district

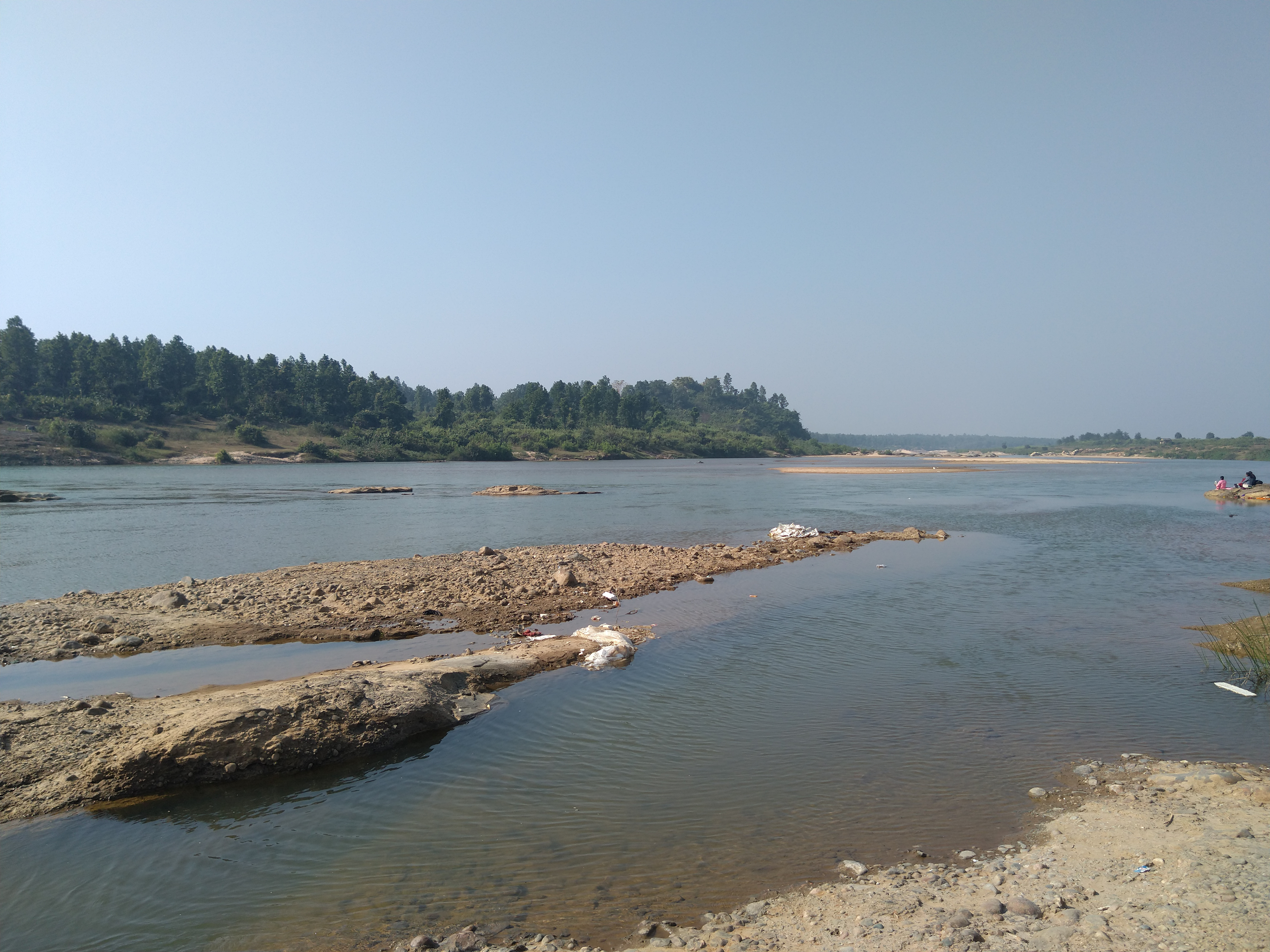
Barakar River at Bandarkupi in Jharkhand

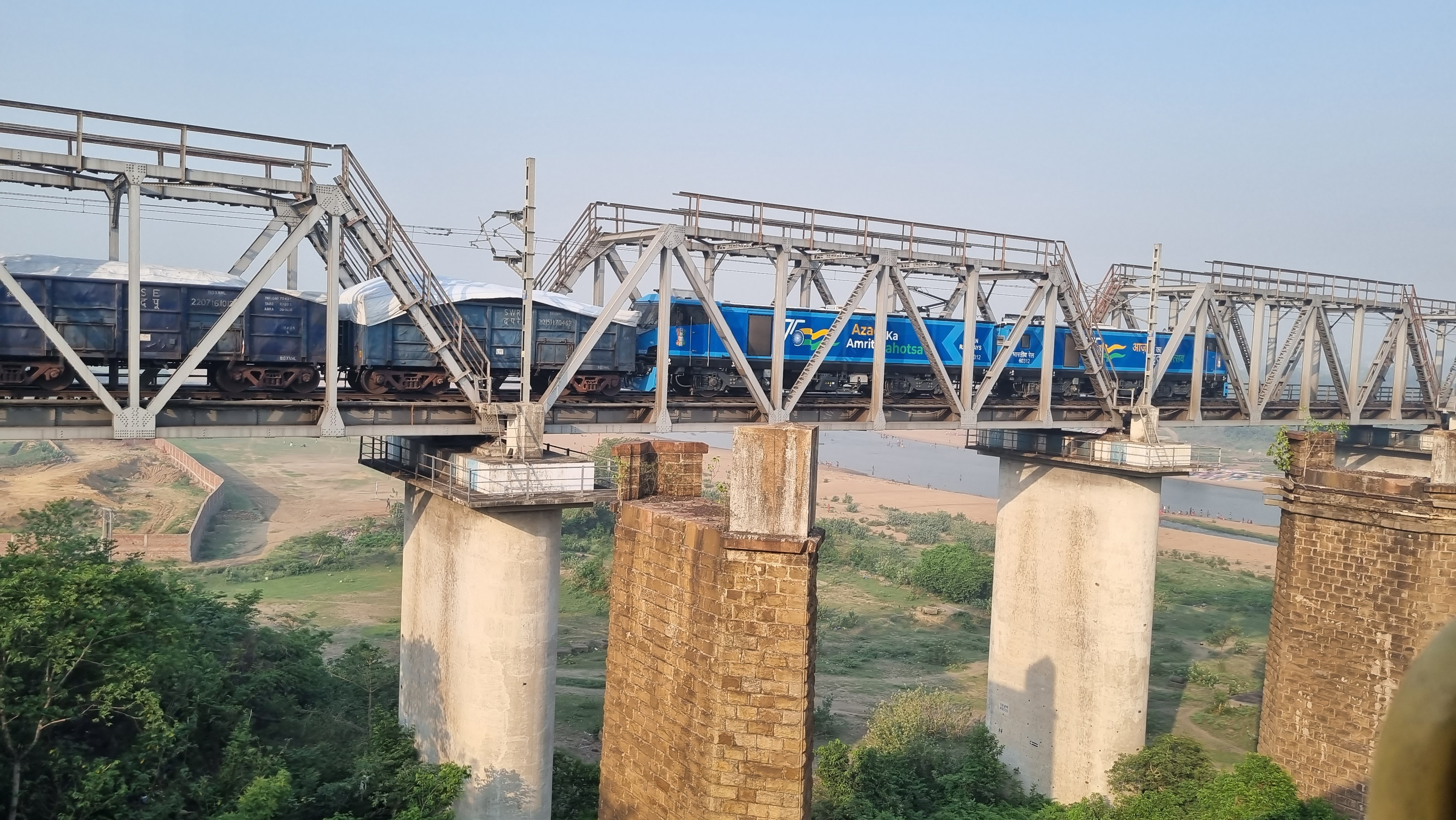
Barakar River Railway Bridge in 2023

The river flows in all fury during the rains in its upper reaches and has washed away two bridges constructed successively on the Grand Trunk Road. The great stone bridge across the river near Barhi, in Hazaribagh district, built around 1848, was washed away in 1913, after a fall of 250 millimetres (10 in) of rain in 24 hours. The narrow iron bridge, which was built to replace it, withstood the strains of troop movement during the Second World War, but gave way in 1946, with another great flood. A new bridge built in the 1950s has withstood the fury of the river.

There is another bridge on the Grand Trunk Road, across the Barakar, connecting Barakar a neighbourhood in Asansol having the same name, in Bardhaman district of West Bengal with Chirkunda in Jharkhand. With heavy traffic in the heart of the coal belt, the bridge built in the mid-19th century is in need of repairs. A new bridge has been built, to the north, on the bypass running from Kalipahari in Asansol to Nirsa in Dhanbad district.

The huge volume of monsoon water was carried down the valley and formerly created havoc with floods in the lower Damodar basin. Annual rainfall over the basin varies between 765 and 1,607 millimetres (30.1 and 63.3 in) with an average of 1,200 millimetres (47 in) of which 80 percent occurs during the monsoon season from June to September. In order to harness the river (along with the Damodar), the Damodar Valley Corporation (DVC) planned and implemented independent India's first multipurpose river valley project. The first dam of the project was constructed across the Barakar at Tilayia.

== Dams and power stations ==
=== Tilaiya ===
DVC's first dam, Tilaiya Dam, was across the Barakar at Tilaiya, in Hazaribagh district of Jharkhand, now in Koderma district of Jharkhand. It was inaugurated on 21 February 1953. The dam is 366 meters (1,201 ft) long and is 30.18 meters (99.0 ft) high from the river bed level. Tilaiya hydel power station is located on the left bank of the river Barakar. The structure is entirely of reinforced concrete. It has two generating units of 2 MW each with a provision for a third future unit of the same capacity.

=== Maithon ===
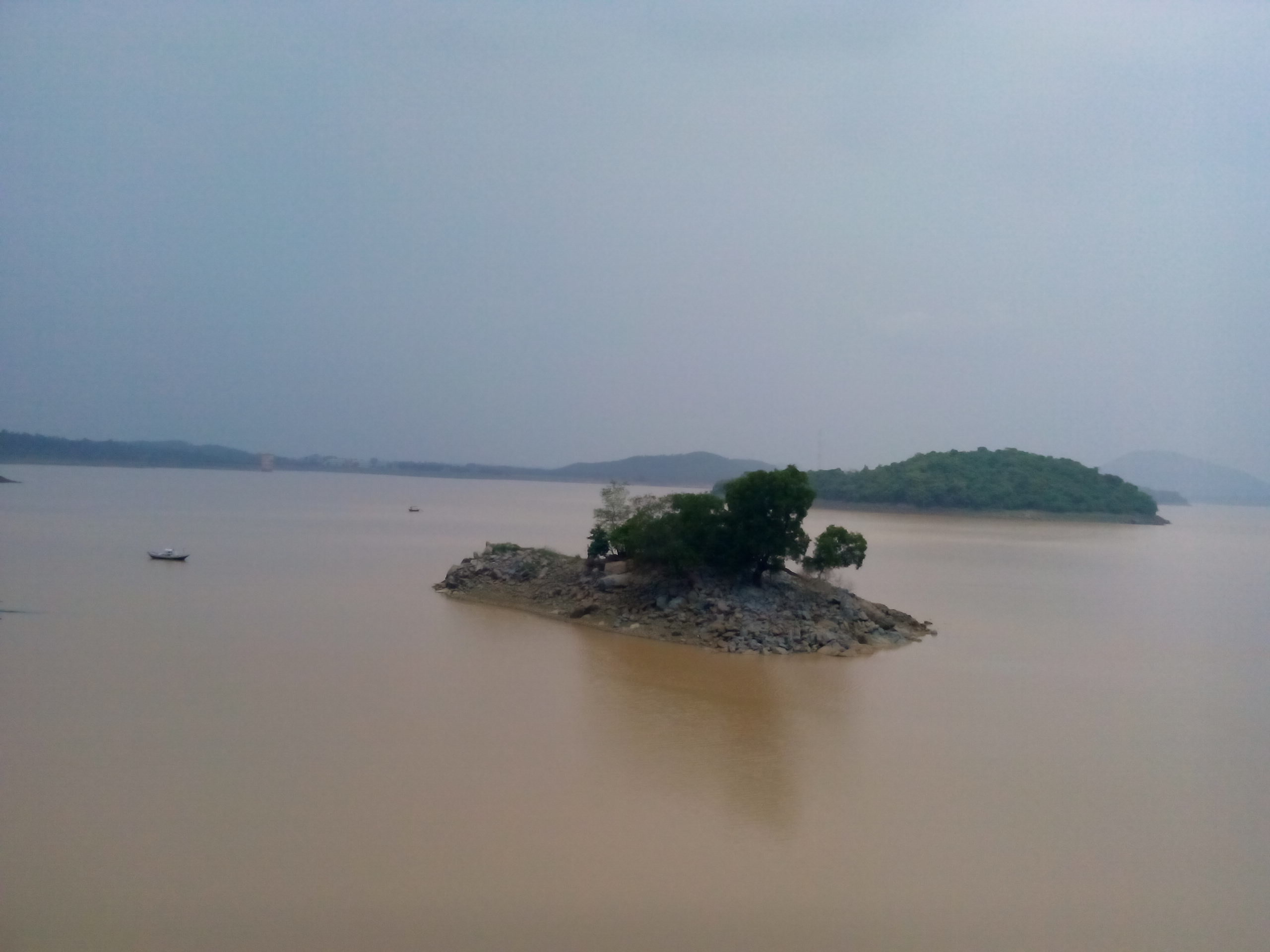
Maithon dam inside

DVC's second dam was across the Konar, a tributary of the Damodar, in Hazaribagh district, and the third was across the Barakar at Maithon in Dhanbad district of Bihar, now Jharkhand. The river forms the boundary between West Bengal and Jharkhand in that area. The dam was inaugurated on 27 September 1957. The dam (both concrete and earthen) is 4,860 meters (15,940 ft) long and the concrete dam is 43.89 meters (144.0 ft) high above the river bed level. The unique feature of Maithon is that the hydel power station is located underground in the left bank of the river (on the West Bengal side) and is the first of its kind in India. The Power Station has a total generating capacity of 60 MW with three units of 20 MW each. About 13 kilometres (8 mi) downstream from Maithon, the Barakar joins the Damodar at Dishergarh.

Maithon Dam is 48 kilometres (30 mi) from Dhanbad and around 25 kilometres (16 mi) from Asansol. Other neighbourhood and suburbs in Asansol namely Rupnarainpur, Chittaranjan and Kulti-Barakar-Neamatpur-Dishergarh lie still nearer. It receives a steady and daily stream of tourists.

In order to augment the meagre hydroelectric power generation DVC has gone in for both gas turbine and thermal power generation. While most of its facilities for such generation lie in the Damodar region, Maithon in the Barakar regions is a major focal point. Maithon Gas Turbine Station was commissioned at Maithon in 1989. The station has an installed capacity of 82.5 MW with three units each of 27.5 MW capacity.

The 2 X 500 MW Maithon Right Bank thermal power station is under implementation. It is a joint venture of Tata Power and DVC. A 2 X 500 MW greenfield thermal power station has been proposed for Koderma.

== Fisheries ==
The reservoirs at Tilaiya and Maithon, provided scope for development of fisheries. Efforts were made to introduce carp once the water accumulated behind the dams but the results have not been commensurate with the efforts.

== See also ==
- List of rivers of India
