= Railpar, Asansol =

Coordinates: 23.692°N 86.974°E

- Neighbourhood in Asansol
- Interactive map of Railpar, Asansol
- Country: India
- State: West Bengal
- District: Paschim Bardhaman
- City: Asansol
- Established: 1885
- Municipal Corporation: Asansol Municipal Corporation
- AMC wards: Ward Nos. 26,27,28,29,30,31
- Telephone code: 0341
- Vehicle registration: WB 37 / WB 38 / WB 44
- Website: paschimbardhaman.co.in

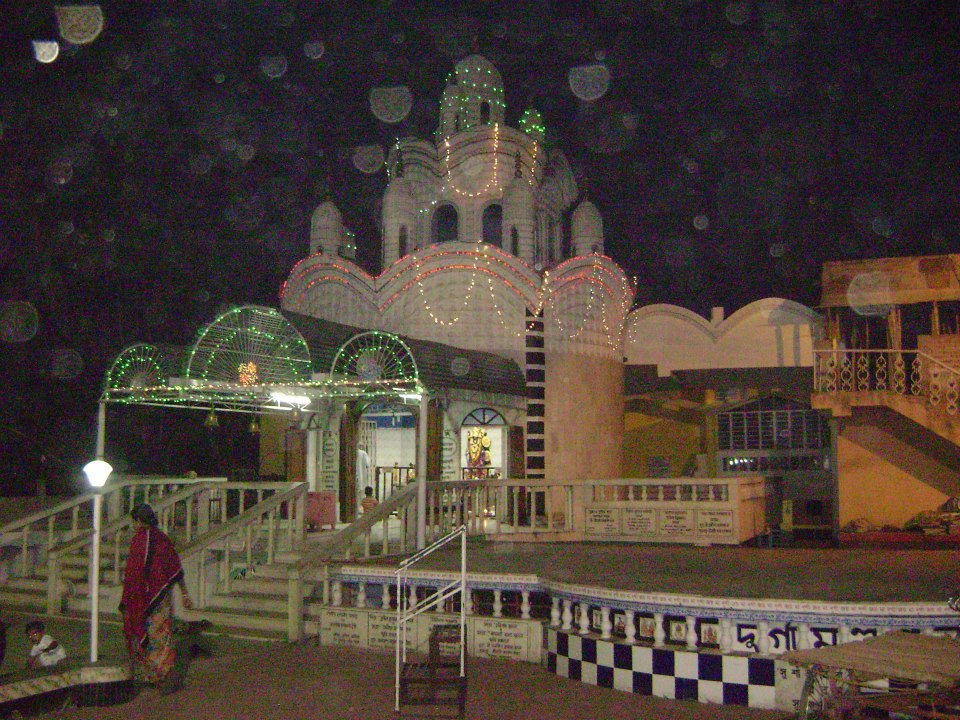
Kali Temple at Night, Railpar, Asansol

Railpar is a neighbourhood in Asansol of Paschim Bardhaman district in the Indian state of West Bengal. It is governed by Asansol Municipal Corporation.

It is one of the important places of the city. The area is located near the Asansol Railway Station. The other neighbourhoods of Asansol that are close to Railpar area are Kalyanpur Housing, Dhadka, ADDA etc. It is one of the oldest neighbourhood in Asansol and the residents are from different communities and religions like Hindus, Muslims, Sikhs and Christian, which adds to the cosmopolitan nature of the area and the city of Asansol.

== Transport ==
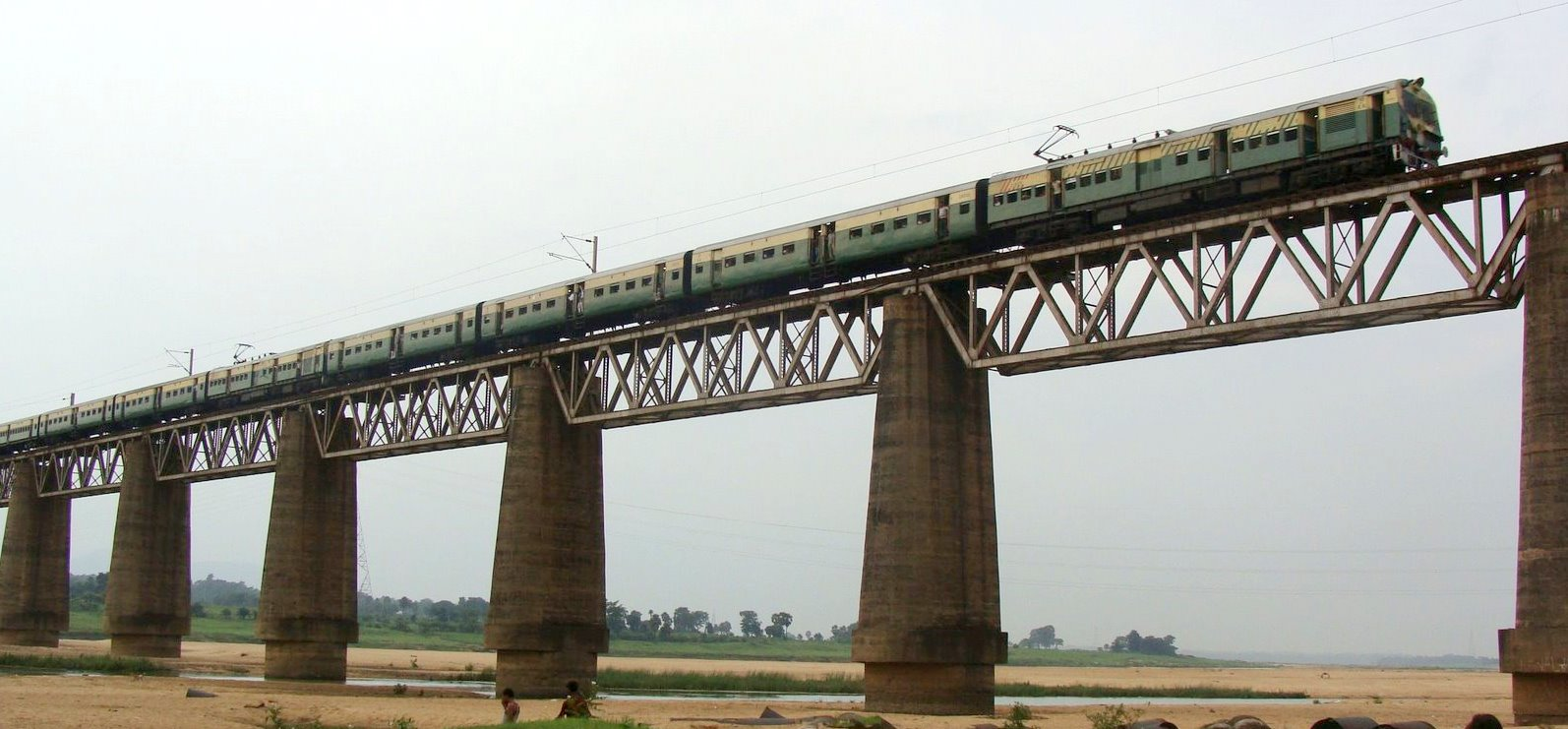
Adra-Asansol MEMU

Railpar is well connect through various modes of transport namely Railways and Roadways.

=== Roadways ===
NH 2/Grand Trunk Road passes through Railpar. Public bus services are available to the residence of Railpar. Bus service ply in the "Chandmari - Asansol Railway Station" route via Mohisila Colony and also from "Dhadka to Kalyanpur Housing". Auto rickshaw from Quraishi Mohalla More to Atwal More, via Asansol Station are also available.

=== Railway ===
Asansol Railway Station which is the main Railway Station availed by the people of Railpar is well connected with different parts of India such as New Delhi, Mumbai, Chennai and many other major cities. Asansol Railway Station is the second biggest Railway Station in West Bengal after Howrah. It serves Asansol as well as its neighbourhood and suburbs.

== Educational institutes ==
Railpar has many Educational Institutes, Schools and Colleges that provides quality education to the people of Asansol megacity. Many candidates from Railpar, in fact the entire megacity visit Railpar for pursuing education.

Some of the Schools in Railpar are: Rahamania High School, Haji Quadam Rasool High School, Balbodhan Vidyalaya, Asansol Hamdard Public School, Bengal Public School, India International School, Dr. Shayam Prasad School, Muslim Academy, Sitladanga Jr. High School, Moulana Azad Free Primary School, Alpha Study Centre, Alfalah Study Center, Orintal Study Center, Shama Study Center, Faiz-e-Aam Masturat, Apna School, JM Public School, MMU High School, Asansol Public School, Iqbaliya FP School, Durga Vidhyalaya, and many more. There are also many Madarsah where Urdu, Arabic as well as Hindi and also English education is provided to the children. Some of the important Madarsahs are Madarsah Diania Islamia, Madarsah Raza-e-Ghoush and Madarsah Khadija-tul-Kubra Lilbanat, Eve Line Iqra Public School Naya Mohalla Punchayat Building.

Asansol Collegiate School provides higher education for the people of Asansol, Asansol Polytechnic is also situated in Railpar which provides ITI and Diploma Engineering to its aspirants and also Kanyapur Polytechnic which offers ITI, Vocational Courses, Short Term Courses and Diploma in Engineering branches. Destiny Computer Education which is affiliated to West Bengal Council of Technical Education an Initiative of Asansol Police, offers various computer programs such as DCA, DTP, DFA, Tally, Vocational courses and many more other programs. Asansol Railpar Educational Welfare Society Vocational Training Provider provides NCVT courses in Electrical, Electronics, Jr. Land Surveyor, Information Technology and Spoken English at Asansol Hamdard Public School, N. R. R. Road, Railpar, Asansol-713302

And NGO's are Asansol North Handicapped Welfare Society, Asansol Sitla Handicapped Welfare Society, Peace India, Tanjimul Muslimin, Asansol Town Netaji Educational Welfare Society etc. NGO's are active in Asansol Area.

== Places ==
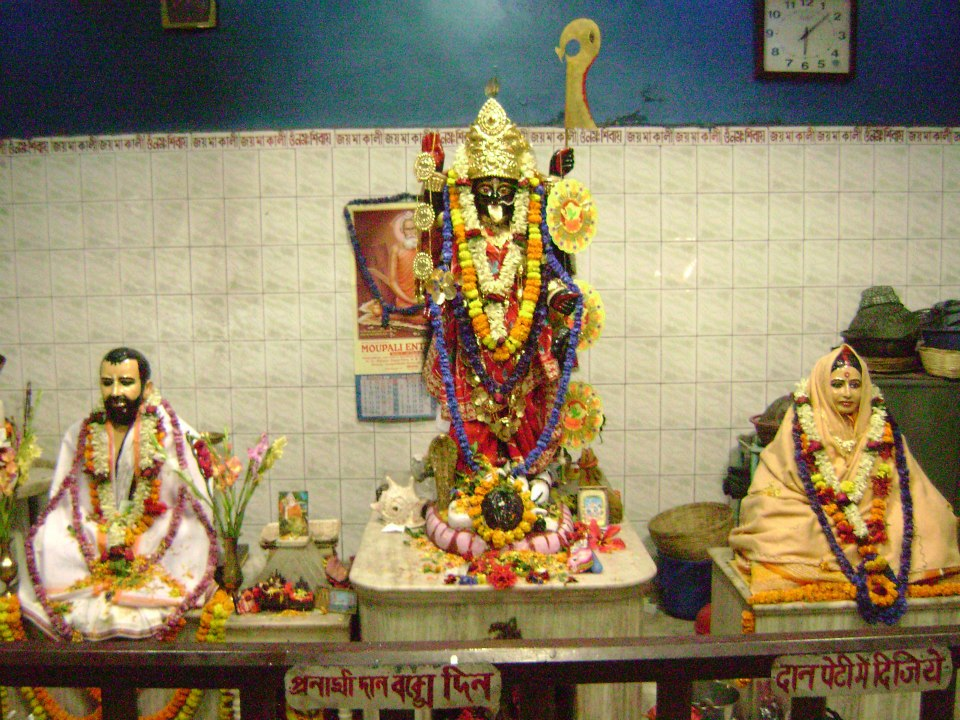
Kali Temple at Railpar, Asansol

Railpur's sites and landmakrs include the Children's Park located at Faiz-E-Aam-Bagh Near Upper Quraishi Mohalla, Gaori River, Bal Bodhan Ground, Asansol Rifle Club, Football Ground- Babu Talab. Some of the famous places in Railpar are Babu Talab, Khan Patti, Mosaddi Mohalla, Beldanga, N.R.R.Road, Jahangiri Mohalla, Dhadka, Mahuwa Dangal, Ram Krishna Dangal, Makkhu Mohalla, OK Road Saitan Cahuki (beside Nasar bhai ka Dokan), Chand Mari, Sitla Danga, Naya Mohalla and many more.

There are several Mosques and Temples for worship in Railpar like Loco Masjid at Beldanga, Baitus Salat Masjid at Naya Mohalla, Baitus Salam Masjid at N.R.R.Road, Makhu Mohalla, Masjid Baitul Mokarram at Azad Basti, Madina Masjid at Babu Talab, Idgah Masjid - at Haji Nagar, Noorani Masjid at Sitladanga, Masjid-E-Alhadaya at Quraishi Mohalla, Masjid-E-Zikra at O.K. Road, Mosaddi Mohalla Masjid at Mosaddi Mohalla, Masjid-e- Quba at Hazrat Illyas Nagar Sitala Village, Noori Masjid at Sher Talab, Jahahngiri Mohalla Masjid at Jahahngiri Mohalla, Charbi Mohalla Masjid at Charbi Mohalla, Shiv Mandir at Chandmari and Shiv Mandir at O.K. Road, Kali Mandir at Kalyanpur Housing, Hanuman Mandir at Balbodhan.

== Projects ==
Major township projects have been constructed in Railpar. ADDA under JNNURM projects has made several Residential Projects for the people of Railpar. Many Residential Apartments are constructed in ADDA, Dhadka, Kalyanpur Housing Colony. Since Railpar is a big area of Asansol many project are going on in Railpar to provide world class infrastructure to the residents.

=== Industry ===
Railpar has several small and big industries which provides employment opportunity to the youths of West Bengal. One of the major industries in Railpar is Blue Factory. Many other small scale industries are located in Railpar like Steel Casting Industry, Wood, Aluminium, School bag & Traveling Bag Manufacturing, Tailoring and Viticulture.

=== Business ventures ===
Railpar has many small and big private business ventures which serves to the local community.

== See also ==
- List of cities in West Bengal
- Asansol railway station
- Asansol-Tatanagar-Kharagpur line
- Asansol subdivision
