= Barakar =

- Neighbourhood in Asansol
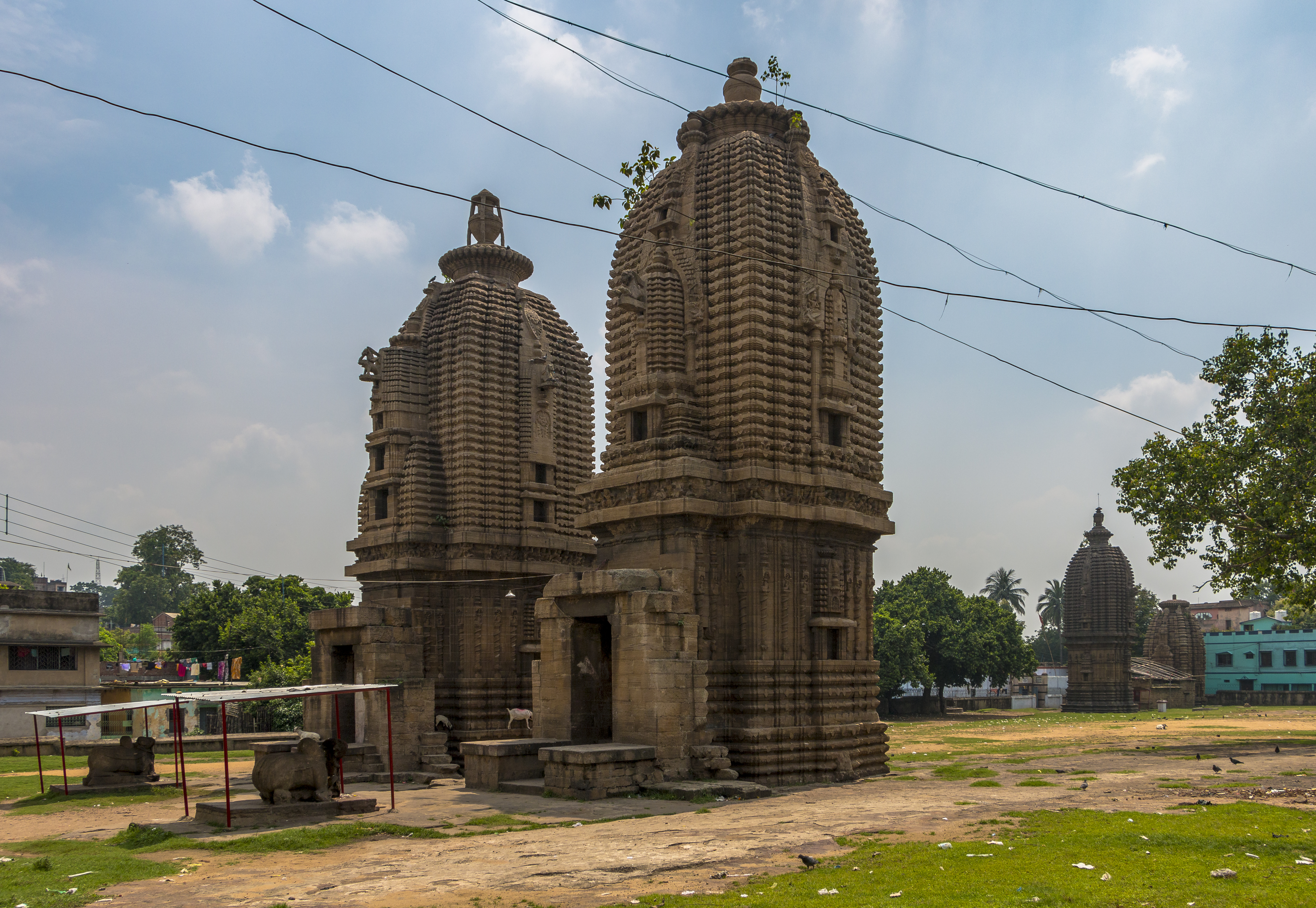
- Begunia Temple at Barakar, Asansol

- Location in Asansol, West Bengal, India
- Coordinates: 23.73°N 86.85°E
- Country: India
- State: West Bengal
- District: Paschim Bardhaman
- City: Asansol
- Municipal Corporation: Asansol Municipal Corporation
- AMC wards: Ward Nos. 66,67,68,69

Languages*
  - Official: Bengali, Hindi, English
- Time zone: UTC+5:30 (IST)
- Lok Sabha constituency: Asansol
- Vidhan Sabha constituency: Kulti
- Website: paschimbardhaman.co.in

Barakar (Bengali pronunciation: [bɔrakɔr]), is a neighbourhood in Asansol, Paschim Bardhaman district in the Indian state of West Bengal. It is governed by the Asansol Municipal Corporation It is situated at the border of the states of Jharkhand and West Bengal. The Grand Trunk Road passes through Barakar. The neighbourhood is located on the banks of the river Barakar.

== Geography ==
Cities, towns and ECL Areas in the western portion of Asansol Sadar subdivision in Paschim Bardhaman district
MC: municipal corporation, P: rural administrative centre, CT: census town, N: neighbourhood, OG: out growth, T: temple
Owing to space constraints in the small map, the actual locations in a larger map may vary slightly

=== Urbanisation ===
As per the 2011 census, 83.33% of the population of Asansol Sadar subdivision was urban and 16.67% was rural. Asansol Sadar subdivision has 26 (+1 partly) Census Towns.

Note: The map alongside presents some of the notable locations in the subdivision. All places marked in the map are linked in the larger full screen map.

.

=== Asansol Municipal Corporation ===
According to the Kolkata Gazette notification of 3 June 2015, the municipal areas of Kulti, Raniganj and Jamuria were included within the jurisdiction of Asansol Municipal Corporation.

*For language details see Salanpur (community development block)#Language and religion

== Begunia temples ==
This is a group of four temples, out of which two consists of a simple cell each, surmounted by a tower-roof and there are traces of a mandapa in front.

There are four temples in one complex known as Begunia temples. The fourth temple, last from the entrance, seems to be the oldest and was built around 8th-9th century. It is amongst the oldest rekh-deul temples in West Bengal. Two other temples are dated around 14th-15th century. The temples have Shiva lingams and idols of Ganesha and Durga. Many stone idols have been discovered in the complex. Some are Vishnu idols but others are Jain idols, possibly belonging to the older fourth temple. Thereafter, it became a Shaivite centre and was also a Vaishnavite centre at some point of time.

== Barakar picture gallery ==
Front view of Ganesh and Durga temples, photographed by JD Beglar in 1872

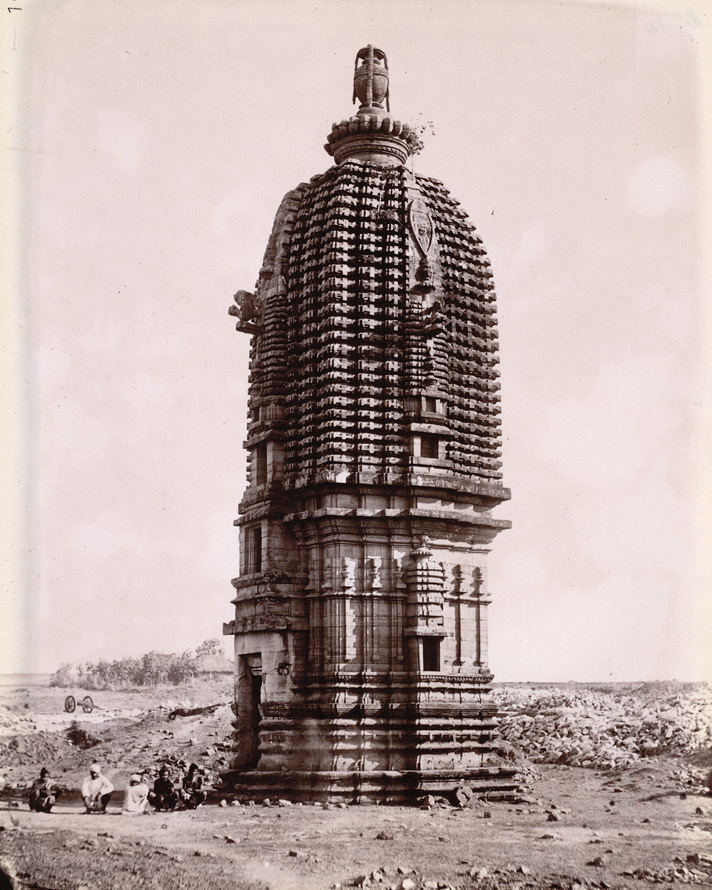
Panchanana temple, photographed around 1872

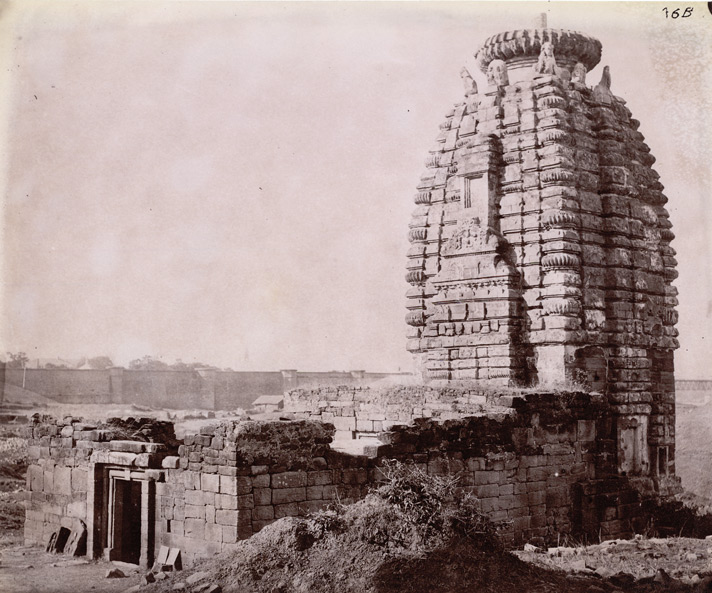
Siddheswara temple, photographed by JD Beglar in 1872

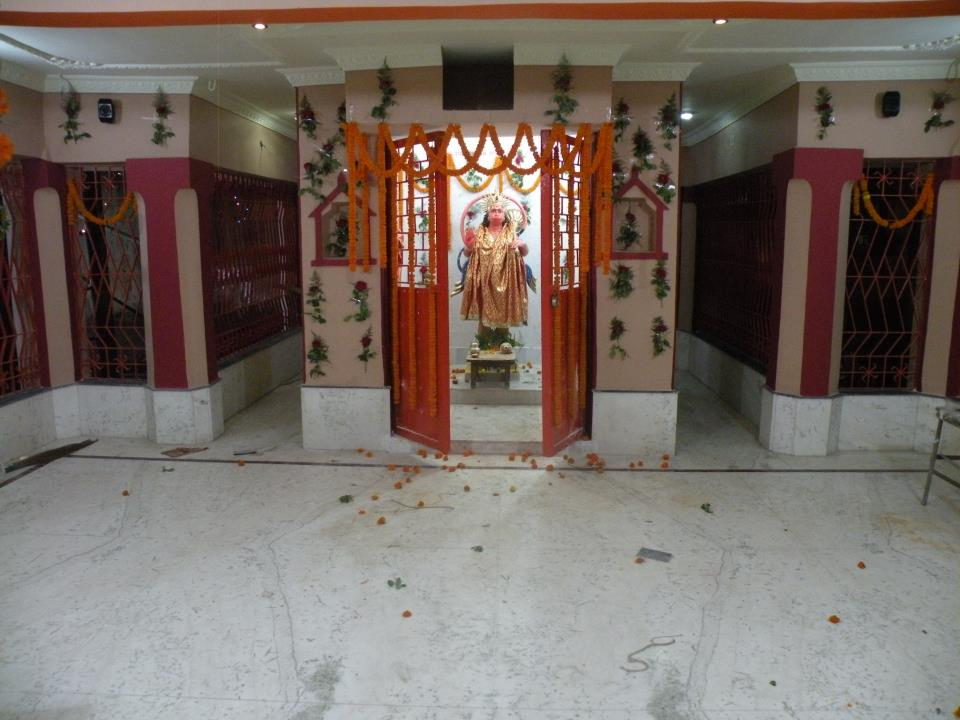
Hanuman Mandir, Barakar
