= Burnpur =

Neighborhood in Asansol in Paschim Bardhaman, West Bengal, India

- Neighbourhood in Asansol
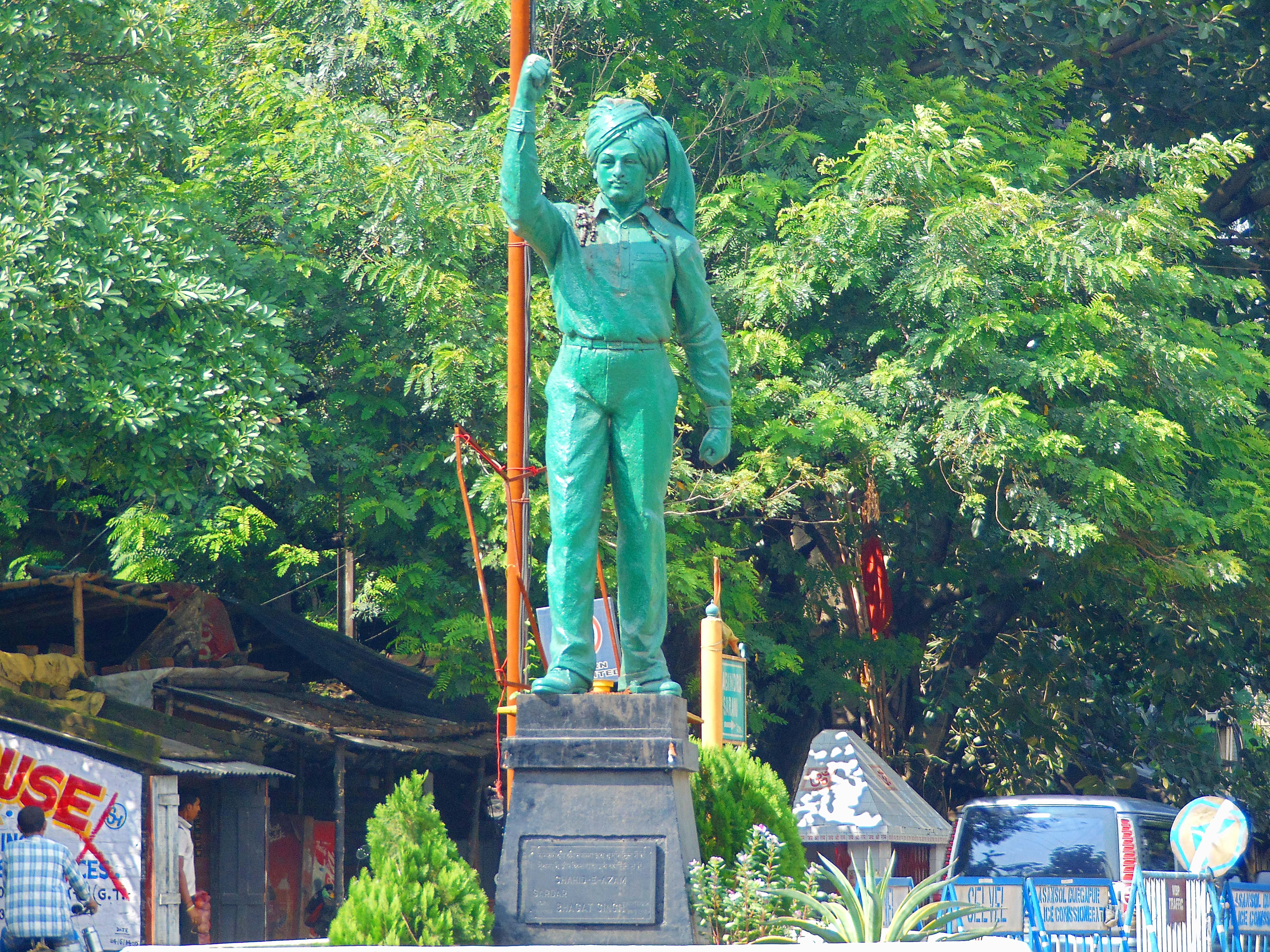

- Location in Asansol, West Bengal, India Burnpur (India)
- Coordinates: 23.6667°N 86.9333°E
- Country: India
- State: West Bengal
- District: West Burdwan
- City: Asansol
- Named for: Martin & Burn Co.
- Municipal Corporation: Asansol Municipal Corporation
- AMC wards: Ward Nos. 75 to 82, 94 to 99 & 106
- Elevation: 75 m (246 ft)
- Demonym: Asansolians / Asansolites

Languages
  - Official: Bengali, Hindi, English
- Time zone: UTC+5:30 (IST)
- Vehicle registration: WB-37 WB-38 WB-44 A-D
- Lok Sabha constituency: Asansol
- Vidhan Sabha constituency: Asansol Dakshin
- Website: westburdwan.co.in

Burnpur is a captive township of SAIL, the area covered by IISCO Steel Plant and its surroundings in Asansol of West Burdwan district, in the heart of the mining-industrial belt in the western periphery of the state of West Bengal, India. It is governed by Asansol Municipal Corporation.

== History ==
In the early British era, Hirapur founds it place in the list of villages under Asansol police station and served by Asansol post office, in the village directory of Burdwan district compiled by the Post Master General of Bengal in 1884. The Bengal Nagpur Railway main line from Nagpur to Asansol, on the Howrah-Delhi main line, was opened for goods traffic on 1 February 1891. A railway station, named Narsinghbandh came up on that line, near Hirapur.

The Indian Iron and Steel Company was incorporated on 11 March 1918. The iron works of IISCO was to be located at Hirapur and was subsequently named Hirapur Works. As the construction of the plant prodeccess, there was brisk activity at Hirapur and the adjoining jungle villages of Santa, Narsinghbandh, Napuria and Dharampur. As Burn Standard Company Limited played an important role in the setting up of the entire project, the upcoming township was christened Burnpur. The name of the railway station, Narsinghbandh, was subsequently changed to Burnpur.

The Steel Corporation of Bengal was incorporated on 20 April 1937 with Burn & Co. as managing agents. SCOB established steel making facilities at Napuria, adjacent to the Hirapur Works of IISCO and the plant was named Napuria Works. In 1953, SCOB was amalgamated with IISCO. Napuria Works producing steel coalesced with Hirapur Works producing iron to form Burnpur Works of IISCO. IISCO went in for major extensions in the fifties. A new township at Chhotodighari was ready for occupation by 1959. Along with the development of the company's township, several areas such as Subashpally, Santinagar, Puranahat, Rahmatnagar and Rambandh developed over the years filling up the area between the old villages of Hirapur and Narsinghbandh.

The Indian Standard Wagon Company, founded in 1918, shared the facilities in the company's township at Burnpur. In 1976, Burn & Co. was amalgamated with the Indian Standard Wagon Company and renamed Burn Standard Company. On 4 April 2018, the Government of India approved the liquidation of Burn Standard Company.

=== Asansol Municipal Corporation ===
Asansol Municipal Corporation emerged as a municipal corporation in 1994 with the merger of Burnpur Notified Area Authority, some rural parts of Asansol community development block and some colliery areas within Asansol Municipality.

== Details ==
Cities, towns and ECL Areas in the western portion of Asansol Sadar subdivision in West Burdwan district
MC: municipal corporation, P: rural administrative centre, CT: census town, N: neighbourhood, OG: out growth, T: temple
Owing to space constraints in the small map, the actual locations in a larger map may vary slightly

Burnpur is located at 23.6667°N 86.9333°E. It has an average elevation of 75 metres (249 feet).

Hirapur police station has jurisdiction over parts of Asansol municipal corporation. The area covered is 63.33 km^{2} and the population covered is 200,000.

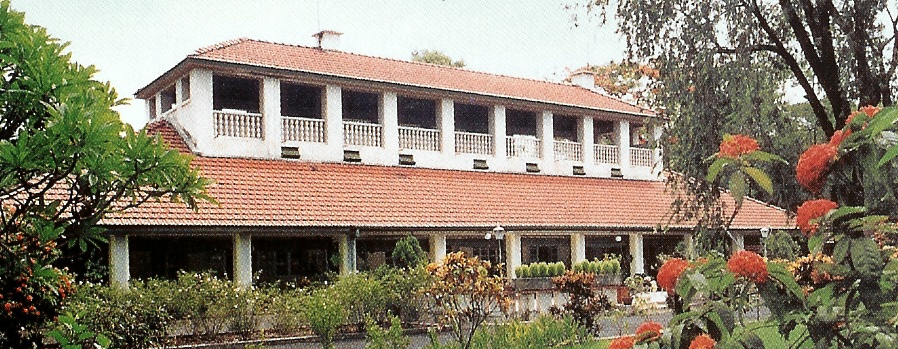
Legacy of a colonial past - A senior officer's bungalow

== Demographics ==
The 2011 Census of India was carried out well before the reorganisation of Asansol Municipal Corporation in 2015. The census data is available on ward basis for the pre-2015 Asansol Municipal Corporation. Asansol South (Vidhan Sabha constituency) covers ward nos. 9, 18, 20, 34 to 50 of pre-2015 Asansol municipal corporation and certain gram panchayats of Raniganj CD Block. These wards of pre-2015 Asansol Municipal Corporation broadly cover the Burnpur area.

As per the 2011 Census of India the wards of pre-2015 Asansol Municipal Corporation in Asansol South (Vidhan Sabha constituency) had a total population of 238,631, of which 123,160 (52%) were males and 114,471 (48%) were females. Population below 6 years was 24,265. The total number of literates was 176,460 (82.32% of the population over 6 years).

Burnpur railway station at Burnpur

== Education ==
IISCO Steel Plant runs Burnpur Boys' High School, Burnpur Girls' High School and Chhotodighari Vidyapeeth. Amongst the other schools are: Bari Vidyalaya High School

Some of the major schools in Burnpur include Burnpur Riverside School, Manik Chand Thakur Institution at Hirapur, Subhaspally Bidyaniketan, and Shantinagar Vidyamandir.

== Culture ==
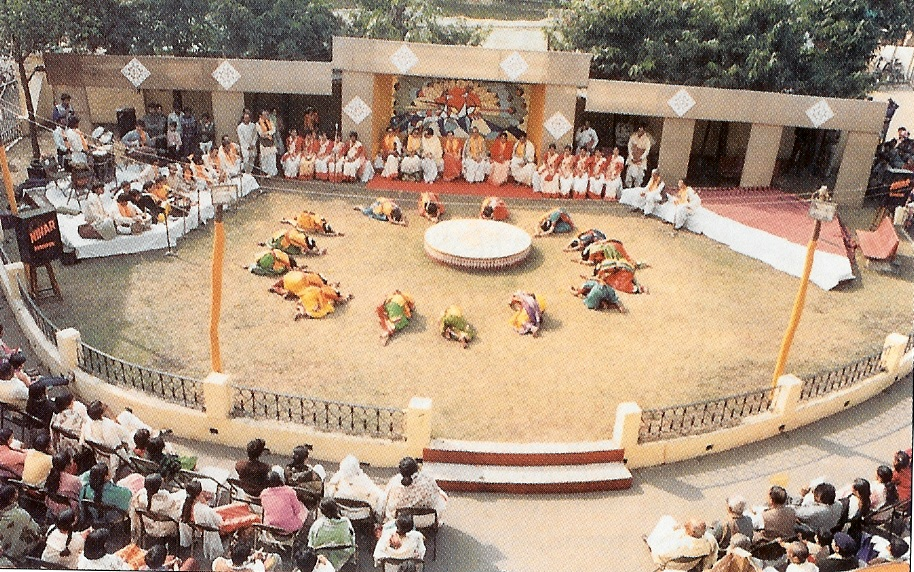
Rich cultural tradition at Bharati Bhaban, Burnpur

From the early years, the social and cultural life at Burnpur evolved around the club, a typical English institution. Burnpur Club was started in 1920. It was earlier named Hirapur Officers Club, and then known as Senior Club for many years. The club building was inaugurated by Sir Rajen Mookerjee. Crescent Club was popular in the earlier days, but closed down later. Bharati Bhaban was also started in 1920, initially known as Hirapur Indian Association, then as Burnpur Indian Association and finally as Bharati Bhaban in 1948. Almost anybody who has made a mark in the Bengali cultural arena has performed at Bharati Bhaban. Stalwarts such as Bade Ghulam Ali Khan, Allauddin Khan, Ravi Shankar, Bhimsen Joshi and M.S. Subbulakshmi have performed at Bharati Bhaban.

== Healthcare ==
There is the 500-bed Burnpur Hospital of IISCO Steel Plant.

== Social welfare ==
IISCO Steel Plant's initiatives, under its corporate social responsibility programme have altered the scenario in the surrounding areas such as Haramdihi, Naksaradata, Gutgutpara, Dhoyrapara, Kakardanga, Purshottampur and Bhallukjor. The plant has adopted the inmates of Cheshire Home, a centre for disabled persons. Two well-known social welfare organisations of the spouses of IISCO Steel Plant employees are Women's Voluntary Services and Burnpur Mahila Samaj.

== Sports ==
Burnpur Stadium is the centre of extensive sporting activities. Amongst the other centres are: Burnpur Cricket Club Ground, ISP Sports House and ISP Boxing Centre.

== See also ==
- Nehru Park, Burnpur
