= Raniganj =

- Neighbourhood in Asansol
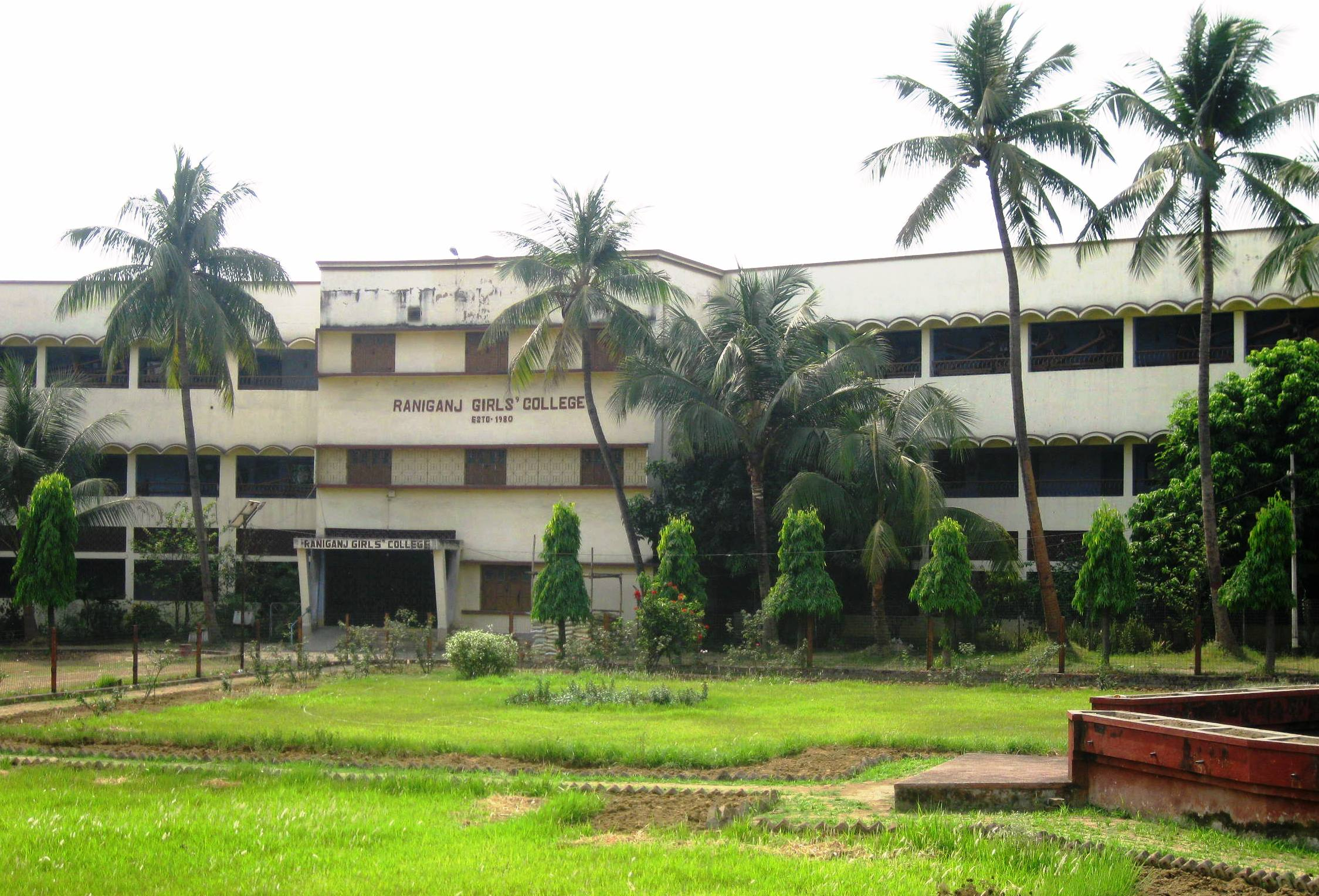
- Raniganj Girls' College main building

- Location in Asansol, West Bengal, India Raniganj (India)
- Coordinates: 23.62°N 87.13°E
- Country: India
- State: West Bengal
- District: Paschim Bardhaman
- City: Asansol
- Municipal Corporation: Asansol Municipal Corporation
- AMC wards: Ward Nos. 33,34,35,36,88,89,90,91,92,93

Government
  - Type: Municipal Corporation
  - Body: Asansol Municipal Corporation
- Elevation: 91 m (299 ft)

Languages
  - Official: Bengali
- Time zone: UTC+5:30 (IST)
- PIN: 713347
- Telephone/STD code: 0341
- ISO 3166 code: IN-WB
- Lok Sabha constituency: Asansol
- Vidhan Sabha constituency: Raniganj
- Website: paschimbardhaman.co.in

Raniganj is a neighbourhood in Asansol of Paschim Bardhaman district in the Indian state of West Bengal. It is governed by Asansol Municipal Corporation.

== Geography ==
Cities and towns in the eastern portion of Asansol Sadar subdivision in Paschim Bardhaman district
MC: Municipal Corporation, CT: census town, N: neighbourhood, R: rural centre
Owing to space constraints in the small map, the actual locations in a larger map may vary slightly

=== Location ===
Raniganj is located at 23.62°N 87.13°E. It has an average elevation of 91 metres (298 feet).

The discovery of coal led to industrialisation of the area and most of the forests have been cleared.

Nunia, a small stream about 40 km (25 mi) long has its origin near Adra village in the Salanpur area, flows through the Barabani area and joins the Damodar in the Raniganj area.

Gram panchayats under Raniganj Panchayat Samiti are: Ratibati, Tirat, Egra, Amrasota, Jemari and Ballavpur.

The current MLA from Raniganj legislative assembly constituency is Partha Ghosh (BJP) and current MP from Asansol Lok Sabha Constituency is Shatrughan Sinha. The mayor of Asansol Municipal Corporation is Bidhan Upadhyay

=== Urbanisation ===
According to the 2011 census, 83.33% of the population of Asansol Sadar subdivision was urban and 16.67% was rural. Asansol Sadar subdivision has 26 (+1 partly) Census Towns (partly presented in the map alongside; all places marked on the map are linked in the full-screen map).

=== Asansol Municipal Corporation ===
According to the Kolkata Gazette notification of 3 June 2015, the municipal areas of Kulti, Raniganj and Jamuria were included within the jurisdiction of Asansol Municipal Corporation.

=== Police station ===
Raniganj police station has jurisdiction over parts of the Asansol Municipal Corporation. The area covered is 113.05 km^{2} (43.65 sq mi) and the population covered is 249,618.

=== CD block HQ ===
The headquarters of Raniganj CD block are located at Raniganj.

== Demographics ==
According to the 2011 Census of India Raniganj municipal area had a total population of 129,441, of which 65,578 (52%) were males and 61,863 (48%) were females. Population in the age range 0–6 years was 15,721. The total number of literate persons in Raniganj was 88,299 (87.85% of the population over 6 years).

*For language details see Raniganj (community development block)#Language and religion

As of 2001 India census, Raniganj had a population of 122,891. Males constitute 53% of the population and females 47%. Raniganj has an average literacy rate of 64%, higher than the national average of 59.5%: male literacy is 72%, and female literacy is 56%. In Raniganj, 11% of the population is under 6 years of age.

=== Languages ===
Languages spoken in Raniganj area (2011)
1. Bengali (69.3%)
2. Hindi (21.3%)
3. Urdu (5.10%)
4. Santali (1.80%)
5. bhojpuri (0.60%)
6. Others (1.70%)

== Education ==
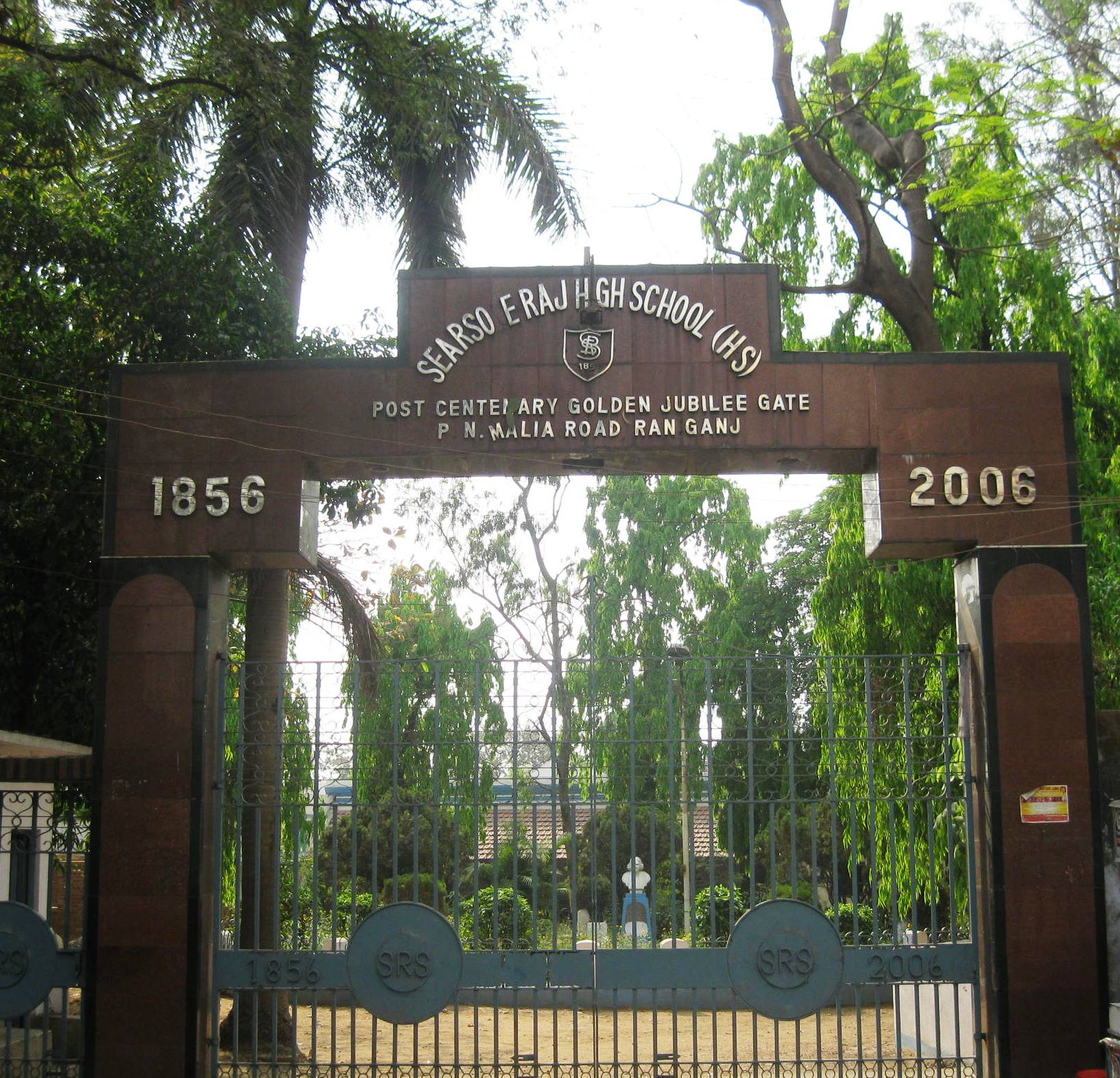
Searsole Raj High School main gate

=== Colleges ===
- Raniganj Girls' College
- Triveni Devi Bhalotia College

=== Schools ===
Raniganj High School is a Bengali-medium boys only institution established in 1888. It has facilities for teaching from class V to class XII. The school has 21 computers, a library with 3,500 books and a playground.

Raniganj G.M. Girls’ High School is a Bengali-medium girls only institution established in 1946. It has facilities for teaching from class V to class XII. The school has 20 computers, a library with 4,000 books and a playground.

Raniganj Marwari Sanatan Vidyalaya is a Hindi-medium boys only institution established in 1912. It has facilities for teaching from class V to class XII. The school has 1 computer, a library with 2,000 books and a playground.

Raniganj B.D.G. Vidyamandir is a Hindi-medium girls only institution established in 1959. It has facilities for teaching from class V to class XII. The school has 12 computers and a library with 3,050 books.

Gyan Bharati School is a Hindi-medium coeducational institution established in 1962. It has facilities for teaching from class I to class XII. The school has a playground.

Raniganj Sri Durga Vidyalaya is a Hindi-medium boys only institution established in 1963. It has facilities for teaching from class V to class XII. The schools has 8 computers and a library with 700 books.

Raniganj Urdu High School is an Urdu-medium co-educational institution established in 1967. It has facilities for teaching from class V to class XII. The school has 10 computers and a library with 900 books.

Searsole Girls’ High School is a Bengali-medium girls only institution established in 1965. It has facilities for teaching from class V to class XII. The school has a library with 116 books and a playground.

Searsole Raj High School is a Bengali-medium boys only institution established in 1856. It has facilities for teaching from class V to class XII. The school has a library with 3,981 books and a playground.

Sishu Bharati Hindi High School is a Hindi-medium coeducational institution established in 1980. It has facilities for teaching from class I to class XII. The school has a playground.

DAV Public School Raniganj is an English-medium coeducational institution established in 1999. It has facilities for teaching from class I to class XII.

Nandalal Jalan Siksha Sadan is an English-medium coeducational institution established in 1986. It has facilities for teaching from class I to class XII. The school has 14 computers, a library with 3,500 books and a playground.

== Healthcare ==
Ballavpur Rural Hospital, with 50 beds, is the major government medical facility in the Raniganj CD block. Raniganj Block Primary Health centre at Raniganj functions with 25 beds. There are primary health centres at Baktarnagar (with 6 beds) and Tirat (with 6 beds).

Other hospitals at Raniganj include Anandlok Hospital, B.N. Agarwal Memorial Hospital, Eye hospital, Kunusturia Area Hospital Marwari Relief Society Hospital among others.

== Notable people ==
- John Bernard (1860-1927), Archbishop of Dublin
- Bansa Gopal Chowdhury (born 1960), politician
- Jahanara Khan (born 1967), politician
- Kuljeet Randhawa (1976–2006), model and actress
