= Egara, Paschim Bardhaman =

Egara
- Census Town
- Location in West Bengal, India Egara (India)
- Coordinates: 23.609293°N 87.100354°E
- Country: India
- State: West Bengal
- District: Paschim Bardhaman

Area
  - Total: 3.66 km^{2} (1.41 sq mi)

Population (2011)
  - Total: 7,623
  - Density: 2,080/km^{2} (5,390/sq mi)

Languages*
  - Official: Bengali, Hindi, English
- Time zone: UTC+5:30 (IST)
- PIN: 713323
- Telephone code: 0341
- Vehicle registration: WB
- Lok Sabha constituency: Asansol
- Vidhan Sabha constituency: Asansol Dakshin
- Website: paschimbardhaman.co.in

Egara is a census town in Raniganj CD block in the Asansol Sadar subdivision of the Paschim Bardhaman district in the Indian state of West Bengal.

== History ==
The earliest mines worked in India by Sumner, Heatly and Redferne included Damulia, in the Raniganj area, near the Damodar River. There were reports that the coal they mined in India was inferior to coal imported from Britain and their ventures failed. In 1814, Warren Hastings sent Rupert Jones to survey the area. Having found trace of coal at a place called Jurwah (Jirwaghar), he sank a shaft there and got coal at a depth of 9 feet only. He found the coal fared well in comparison with British coal. He opened a coal mine at Egara and got the coal extracted from a pit (not a quarry). He was probably the first person to introduce Indian coal in the general market, but he failed in mining coal profitably. An agency house, Alexander and Company, became owners of the colliery around 1820. It was the "first regularly constituted mining company with European capital in Bengal."

== Geography ==
Cities and towns in the eastern portion of Asansol Sadar subdivision in Paschim Bardhaman district
MC: Municipal Corporation, CT: census town, N: neighbourhood, R: rural centre
Owing to space constraints in the small map, the actual locations in a larger map may vary slightly

=== Location ===
Egara is located at 23.609293°N 87.100354°E.

Jemari (J.K. Nagar Township), Belebathan, Murgathaul, Amkula, Egara, Sahebganj, Raghunathchak and Ballavpur form a cluster of census towns on the western and southern side of Raniganj. Banshra and Baktarnagar are adjacent to Raniganj on the eastern side.

=== Urbanisation ===
According to the 2011 census, 83.33% of the population of the Asansol Sadar subdivision was urban and 16.67% was rural. In 2015, the municipal areas of Kulti, Raniganj and Jamuria were included within the jurisdiction of the Asansol Municipal Corporation. Asansol Sadar subdivision has 26 (+1 partly) Census Towns.(partly presented in the map alongside; all places marked on the map are linked in the full-screen map).

== Demographics ==
According to the 2011 Census of India, Egara had a total population of 7,623 of which 3,918 (51%) were males and 3,705 (49%) were females. Population in the age range 0–6 years was 813. The total number of literate persons in Egara was 5,262 (77.27% of the population over 6 years).

*For language details see Raniganj (community development block)#Language and religion

According to the 2011 census, the urban agglomeration (UA) centred upon Asansol had a population of 1,243,414. In addition to the erstwhile municipalities of Kulti, Jamuria, and Raniganj subsequently incorporated into the Asansol Municipal Corporation, the agglomeration included the census towns of Amkula, Baktarnagar, Ballavpur, Bhanowara, Domohani, Egara, Jemari (J.K. Nagar Township), Majiara, Murgathaul, Raghunathchak, Sahebganj and Topsi, and also Charanpur, an outgrowth of Jamuria.

== Infrastructure ==
According to the District Census Handbook 2011, Bardhaman, Egara covered an area of 3.66 km^{2}. Among the civic amenities, it had 7.5 km roads, the protected water-supply involved tapwater from treated source, uncovered wells. It had 700 domestic electric connections. Among the medical facilities it had was 1 medicine shop. Among the educational facilities it had were 4 primary schools, 1 middle school, 1 secondary school, the nearest senior secondary school at Raniganj 5 km away. Among the commodities it produced were paddy, seeds, vegetables.

== Economy ==
As per the ECL website telephone numbers, operational collieries in the Satgram Area in 2018 are: Chapui Khas Colliery, JK Nagar Project, Jemehari Colliery, Kalidaspur Project, Kuardi Colliery, Nimcha Colliery, Pure Searsole Colliery, Ratibati Colliery, Satgram Project and Satgram Incline.

As per ECL website telephone numbers, operational collieries in the Kunustoria Area in 2018 are: Amritnagar Colliery, Amrasota Colliery, Bansra Colliery, Belbaid Colliery, Kunustoria Colliery, Mahabir OCP, North Searsole Colliery, Parasea Colliery, Parasea 6 & 7 Incline and Parasea OCP.

== Education ==
Old Egara High School is a Bengali-medium coeducational institution established in 2001. It has facilities for teaching from class V to class XII. The school has a library with 1,050 books.
