= Chapui =

- Census Town
- Location in West Bengal, India Chapui (India)
- Coordinates: 23.659157°N 87.030093°E
- Country: India
- State: West Bengal
- District: Paschim Bardhaman

Area
  - Total: 1.18 km^{2} (0.46 sq mi)

Population (2011)
  - Total: 5,358
  - Density: 4,540/km^{2} (11,800/sq mi)

Languages*
  - Official: Bengali, Hindi, English
- Time zone: UTC+5:30 (IST)
- PIN: 713339
- Telephone code: 0341
- Vehicle registration: WB
- Website: paschimbardhaman.co.in

Chapui is a census town in the Raniganj CD block in the Asansol Sadar subdivision of the Paschim Bardhaman district in the state of West Bengal, India.

== Geography ==
Cities and towns in the eastern portion of Asansol Sadar subdivision in Paschim Bardhaman district
MC: Municipal Corporation, CT: census town, N: neighbourhood, R: rural centre
Owing to space constraints in the small map, the actual locations in a larger map may vary slightly

=== Location ===
The Asansol-Durgapur region has undulating laterite soil. This area lies between the Damodar River and the Ajay River. The discovery of coal in the 18th century led to industrialisation of the area and most of the forests have been cleared.

=== Urbanisation ===
According to the 2011 census, 83.33% of the population of Asansol Sadar subdivision was urban and 16.67% was rural. In 2015, the municipal areas of Kulti, Raniganj and Jamuria were included within the jurisdiction of Asansol Municipal Corporation. Asansol Sadar subdivision has 26 (+1 partly) Census Towns.(partly presented in the map alongside; all places marked on the map are linked in the full-screen map).

== Demographics ==
According to the 2011 Census of India, Chapui had a total population of 5,358 of which 2,873 (54%) were males and 2,485 (46%) were females. Population in the age range 0–6 years was 590. The total number of literate persons in Chapui was 3,649 (76.53% of the population over 6 years).

*For language details see Raniganj (community development block)#Language and religion

As of 2001 India census, Chapui had a population of 5,185. Males constitute 55% of the population and females 45%. Chapui has an average literacy rate of 59%, lower than the national average of 59.5%; with male literacy of 71% and female literacy of 46%. 12% of the population is under 6 years of age.

== Infrastructure ==
According to the District Census Handbook 2011, Bardhaman, Chapui covered an area of 1.18 km^{2}. Among the civic amenities, the protected water supply involved service reservoir, tap water from untreated sources. It had 267 domestic electric connections and 44 road lighting (points). Among the medical facilities, it had was 8 medicine shops. Among the educational facilities it had was 1 primary school, 1 secondary school.

== Economy ==
Chapui is a coal mining area. Chaui Khas colliery is operated under Damodar River.

Collieries in the Satgram Area of Eastern Coalfields are: Kalidaspur, J.K.Nagar, Satgram, Ratibati, Chapui Khas, Mithapur, Nimcha, Jemehari, Pure Searsole, Tirath, Kuardih, Ardragram OCP and Seetaldasji OCP.

== Education ==
Chapui has four primary school.

Chapui Sawra Vidyasagar Junior High School is a Bengali-medium institution established in 2010. It has facilities for teaching from class V to class VIII.

== Culture ==
Handicrafts: Kantha Stitch work, Wood carvings and Jute-based products

== Healthcare ==
Medical facilities (hospitals and dispensaries) in the Satgram Area of ECL are available at Satgram Area Hospital (PO Devchandnagar) (with 30 beds), Satgram Project (PO Devchandnagar), Mithapur (PO Jamuria), Satgram Incline (PO Jamuria), Jamehari (PO Searsole Rajbari), JK Nagar (PO Bidhanbag), Nimcha (PO Nimcha), Amkola (PO Nimcha), Kalidaspur Project (PO Bhara Kalibari, Mejia), Jora Morh Colony (PO Bhara Kalibari, Mejia), Ratibati (PO Ratibati), Kuardih (PO Kalipahari), Chapui Khas (PO Chapui), Tirat (PO Kalipahari).
