= Raghunathchak =

- Census Town
- Location in West Bengal, India Raghunathchak (India)
- Coordinates: 23.594361°N 87.12382°E
- Country: India
- State: West Bengal
- District: Paschim Bardhaman

Area
  - Total: 0.87 km^{2} (0.34 sq mi)

Population (2011)
  - Total: 6,006
  - Density: 6,900/km^{2} (18,000/sq mi)

Languages*
  - Official: Bengali, Hindi, English
- Time zone: UTC+5:30 (IST)
- PIN: 713359
- Telephone/ STD code: 0341
- Vehicle registration: WB
- Website: paschimbardhaman.co.in

Raghunathchak is a census town in the Raniganj CD block in the Asansol Sadar subdivision of the Paschim Bardhaman district in the Indian state of West Bengal.

== Geography ==
Cities and towns in the eastern portion of Asansol Sadar subdivision in Paschim Bardhaman district
MC: Municipal Corporation, CT: census town, N: neighbourhood, R: rural centre
Owing to space constraints in the small map, the actual locations in a larger map may vary slightly

=== Location ===
Raghunathchak is located at 23°35′40″N 87°07′26″E.

Jemari (J.K. Nagar Township), Belebathan, Murgathaul, Amkula, Egara, Sahebganj, Raghunathchak and Ballavpur form a cluster of census towns on the western and southern side of Raniganj. Banshra and Baktarnagar are adjacent to Raniganj on the eastern side.

=== Urbanisation ===
According to the 2011 census, 83.33% of the population of the Asansol Sadar subdivision was urban and 16.67% was rural. In 2015, the municipal areas of Kulti, Raniganj and Jamuria were included within the jurisdiction of Asansol Municipal Corporation. Asansol Sadar subdivision has 26 (+1 partly) Census Towns.(partly presented in the map alongside; all places marked on the map are linked in the full-screen map).

== Demographics ==
According to the 2011 Census of India, Raghunathchak had a total population of 6,006 of which 3,149 (52%) were males and 2,857 (48%) were females. Population in the age range 0–6 years was 784. The total number of literate persons in Raghunathchak was 3,768 (72.16% of the population over 6 years).

*For language details see Raniganj (community development block)#Language and religion

According to the 2011 census, the urban agglomeration (UA) centred upon Asansol had a population of 1,243,414. In addition to the erstwhile municipalities of Kulti, Jamuria, and Raniganj subsequently incorporated into the Asansol Municipal Corporation, the agglomeration included the census towns of Amkula, Baktarnagar, Ballavpur, Bhanowara, Domohani, Egara, Jemari (J.K. Nagar Township), Majiara, Murgathaul, Raghunathchak, Sahebganj and Topsi, and also Charanpur, an outgrowth of Jamuria.

As of 2001 India census, Raghunathchak had a population of 5,477. Males constitute 54% of the population and females 46%. Raghunathchak has an average literacy rate of 61%, higher than the national average of 59.5%: male literacy is 69%, and female literacy is 52%. In Raghunathchak, 13% of the population is under 6 years of age.

== Infrastructure ==
According to the District Census Handbook 2011, Bardhaman, Raghunathchak covered an area of 0.87 km^{2}. Among the civic amenities, it had 12 km roads with open drains, the protected water-supply involved overhead tank, tubewell, borewell. It had 291 domestic electric connections. Among the medical facilities it had were 1 hospital, 4 medicine shops. Among the educational facilities it had were 2 primary schools, the nearest middle, secondary school at Ballavpur 0.5 km away, the nearest senior secondary school at Raniganj 3 km away. It had 1 non-formal education centre (Sarba Siksha Abhiyan).

== Education ==
Raghunathchak has two primary schools.
