= Majiara =

- Census Town
- Location in West Bengal, India Majiara (India)
- Coordinates: 23.724944°N 87.017611°E
- Country: India
- State: West Bengal
- District: Paschim Bardhaman

Area
  - Total: 7.1883 km^{2} (2.7754 sq mi)

Population (2011)
  - Total: 5,444
  - Density: 757.3/km^{2} (1,962/sq mi)

Languages*
  - Official: Bengali, Hindi, English
- Time zone: UTC+5:30 (IST)
- PIN: 713330
- Telephone code: 0341
- Vehicle registration: WB
- Lok Sabha constituency: Asansol
- Vidhan Sabha constituency: Barabani
- Website: paschimbardhaman.co.in

Majiara is a census town in the Barabani CD block in the Asansol Sadar subdivision of the Paschim Bardhaman district in the Indian state of West Bengal.

== Geography ==
=== Location ===
Majiara is located at 23.724944°N 87.017611°E

Cities, towns and ECL Areas in the western portion of Asansol Sadar subdivision in Paschim Bardhaman district
MC: municipal corporation, P: rural administrative centre, CT: census town, N: neighbourhood, OG: out growth, T: temple
Owing to space constraints in the small map, the actual locations in a larger map may vary slightly

Pangachhiya, Majiara, Bhanowara, Domohani, Charanpur (OG), Ratibati and Chelad form a cluster of census towns and an outgrowth on the northern and eastern sides of Asansol.

=== Urbanisation ===
According to the 2011 census, 83.33% of the population of Asansol Sadar subdivision was urban and 16.67% was rural. In 2015, the municipal areas of Kulti, Raniganj and Jamuria were included within the jurisdiction of Asansol Municipal Corporation. Asansol Sadar subdivision has 26 (+1 partly) Census Towns.(partly presented in the map alongside; all places marked on the map are linked in the full-screen map).

== Demographics ==
According to the 2011 Census of India, Majiara had a total population of 5,444 of which 2,813 (52%) were males and 2,631 (48%) were females. Population in the age range 0–6 years was 721. The total number of literate persons in Majiara was 3,341 (70,74% of the population over 6 years).

*For language details see Barabani (community development block)#Language and religion

According to the 2011 census, the urban agglomeration (UA) centred upon Asansol had a population of 1,243,414. In addition to the erstwhile municipalities of Kulti, Jamuria, and Raniganj subsequently incorporated into the Asansol Municipal Corporation, the agglomeration included the census towns of Amkula, Baktarnagar, Ballavpur, Bhanowara, Domohani, Egara, Jemari (J.K. Nagar Township), Majiara, Murgathaul, Raghunathchak, Sahebganj and Topsi, and also Charanpur, an outgrowth of Jamuria.

== Infrastructure ==
According to the District Census Handbook 2011, Bardhaman, Majiara covered an area of 7.1883 km^{2}. Among the civic amenities, it had 6 km roads with both open and covered drains, the protected water supply involved overhead tank, tap water from treated sources, handpump, tank, pond, lake. It had 800 domestic electric connections. Among the medical facilities it had 1 dispensary/ health centre, 6 medicine shops. Among the educational facilities it had were 4 primary schools, 1 middle school, the nearest secondary school at Kalla 1 km away, the nearest senior secondary school and the nearest general degree college at Asansol 9 km away. Among the social, recreational and cultural facilities, it had a public library. Among the important commodities it produced was bricks.

== Education ==
Majiarah High School is a Bengali-medium coeducational institution established in 2008. It has facilities for teaching from class V to class VIII.
