= Belebathan =

- Census Town
- Location in West Bengal, India Belebathan (India)
- Coordinates: 23.638715°N 87.064426°E
- Country: India
- State: West Bengal
- District: Paschim Bardhaman

Area
  - Total: 2.95 km^{2} (1.14 sq mi)

Population (2011)
  - Total: 4,459
  - Density: 1,510/km^{2} (3,910/sq mi)

Languages*
  - Official: Bengali, Hindi, English
- Time zone: UTC+5:30 (IST)
- PIN: 713323
- Telephone code: 0341
- Vehicle registration: WB
- Website: paschimbardhaman.co.in

Belebathan is a census town in the Raniganj CD block in the Asansol Sadar subdivision of the Paschim Bardhaman district in the state of West Bengal, India.

== Geography ==
Cities and towns in the eastern portion of Asansol Sadar subdivision in Paschim Bardhaman district
MC: Municipal Corporation, CT: census town, N: neighbourhood, R: rural centre
Owing to space constraints in the small map, the actual locations in a larger map may vary slightly

=== Location ===
Belebathan is located at 23°38′19″N 87°03′52″E.

Jemari (J.K. Nagar Township), Belebathan, Murgathaul, Amkula, Egara, Sahebganj, Raghunathchak and Ballavpur form a cluster of census towns on the western and southern side of Raniganj. Banshra and Baktarnagar are adjacent to Raniganj on the eastern side.

=== Urbanisation ===
According to the 2011 census, 83.33% of the population of Asansol Sadar subdivision was urban and 16.67% was rural. In 2015, the municipal areas of Kulti, Raniganj and Jamuria were included within the jurisdiction of Asansol Municipal Corporation. Asansol Sadar subdivision has 26 (+1 partly) Census Towns.(partly presented in the map alongside; all places marked on the map are linked in the full-screen map).

== Demographics ==
According to the 2011 Census of India Belebathan had a total population of 4,459 of which 2,302 (52%) were males and 2,157 (48%) were females. Population in age mix 0–6 years was 594. The total number of literate persons in Belebathan was 2,792 (72.24% of the population over 6 years).

*For language details see Raniganj (community development block)#Language and religion

As of 2001 India census, Belebathan had a population of 4,292. Males constitute 53% of the population and females 47%. Belebathan has an average literacy rate of 54%, lower than the national average of 59.5%; 66% of the literates are males and 34% are females. 15% of the population is under 6 years of age.

== Infrastructure ==
According to the District Census Handbook 2011, Bardhaman, Belebathan covered an area of 2.95 km^{2}. Among the civic amenities, it had 8 km roads with open drains, the protected water-supply involved overhead tank, tube well, borewell, uncovered wells. It had 335 domestic electric connections. Among the medical facilities, it had 1 dispensary/ health centre, 5 medicine shops. Among the educational facilities it had were 2 primary schools, 1 middle school, the nearest senior secondary school at Jemari (J.K. Nagar Township) 1 km away. It had 2 non-formal education centres (Sarva Shiksha Abhiyan). An important commodity it produced was coal.

== Education ==
Belebathan has two primary schools.
