= Jemari (J.K. Nagar Township) =

- Census Town
- Location in West Bengal, India Jemari (J.K. Nagar Township) (India)
- Coordinates: 23.65727°N 87.066829°E
- Country: India
- State: West Bengal
- District: Paschim Bardhaman

Area
  - Total: 4.24 km^{2} (1.64 sq mi)

Population (2011)
  - Total: 13,179
  - Density: 3,110/km^{2} (8,050/sq mi)

Languages*
  - Official: Bengali, Hindi, English
- Time zone: UTC+5:30 (IST)
- PIN: 713337
- Vehicle registration: WB
- Website: paschimbardhaman.co.in

Jemari (J.K. Nagar Township) is a census town in the Raniganj CD block in the Asansol Sadar subdivision of the Paschim Bardhaman district in the Indian state of West Bengal.

== Geography ==
Cities and towns in the eastern portion of Asansol Sadar subdivision in Paschim Bardhaman district
MC: Municipal Corporation, CT: census town, N: neighbourhood, R: rural centre
Owing to space constraints in the small map, the actual locations in a larger map may vary slightly

=== Location ===
J.K.Nagar Township is located at 23°39′26″N 87°04′01″E.

Jemari (J.K. Nagar Township), Belebathan, Murgathaul, Amkula, Egara, Sahebganj, Raghunathchak and Ballavpur form a cluster of census towns on the western and southern side of Raniganj. Banshra and Baktarnagar are adjacent to Raniganj on the eastern side.

=== Urbanisation ===
According to the 2011 census, 83.33% of the population of Asansol Sadar subdivision was urban and 16.67% was rural. In 2015, the municipal areas of Kulti, Raniganj and Jamuria were included within the jurisdiction of Asansol Municipal Corporation. Asansol Sadar subdivision has 26 (+1 partly) Census Towns.(partly presented in the map alongside; all places marked on the map are linked in the full-screen map).

== Demographics ==
According to the 2011 Census of India, Jemari (J.K. Nagar Township) had a total population of 13,179 of which 7,026 (53%) were males and 6,153 (47%) were females. Population in the age range 0–6 years was 1,660. The total number of literate persons in Jemari (J.K. Nagar Township) was 8,464 (73.48% of the population over 6 years).

*For language details see Raniganj (community development block)#Language and religion

According to the 2011 census, the urban agglomeration (UA) centred upon Asansol had a population of 1,243,414. In addition to the erstwhile municipalities of Kulti, Jamuria, and Raniganj subsequently incorporated into the Asansol Municipal Corporation, the agglomeration included the census towns of Amkula, Baktarnagar, Ballavpur, Bhanowara, Domohani, Egara, Jemari (J.K. Nagar Township), Majiara, Murgathaul, Raghunathchak, Sahebganj and Topsi, and also Charanpur, an outgrowth of Jamuria.

As of 2001 India census, Jemari (J.K. Nagar Township) had a population of 14,087. Males constitute 55% of the population and females 45%. Jemari (J.K. Nagar Township) has an average literacy rate of 62%, higher than the national average of 59.5%: male literacy is 71%, and female literacy is 51%. In Jemari (J.K. Nagar Township), 12% of the population is under 6 years of age.

== Infrastructure ==
According to the District Census Handbook 2011, Bardhaman, Jemari (JK Nagar Township) covered an area of 4.24 km^{2}. Among the civic amenities, it 13 km roads with open drains, the protected water-supply involved overhead tank, tube well, bore well, tap water from untreated sources. It had 600 domestic electric connections. Among the medical facilities, it had were 1 hospital, 1 medicine shop. Among the educational facilities it had were 8 primary schools, 1 secondary school. It had 5 non-formal education centres (Sarva Shiksha Abhiyan). It had branch office of 1 nationalised bank.

== Economy ==
Lakshmipat Singhania moved to Kolkata in 1951. He set up the Aluminium Corporation of India, India’s first aluminium producer, near Asansol. When young Lakshmipat Singhania joined the family business, it was among the leading industrial houses in the country. Things went wrong with the rise of militant trade unionism in the 1960s and once the works manager of the Alumuminium Corporation of India was beaten at the factory gate for about two hours and the police and the government did not respond to the calls for help, it was virtually end of the road for the Singhanias, particularly at Jaykaynagar. The Aluminium Corporation of India, Asansol was merged with BALCO in 1984 and has since been known as BALCO – Bidhanbag unit. It was then a public sector unit. In 2001, BALCO was taken over by Sterlite Industries. The take-over included the Bidhanbag unit which only had downstream facilities.

Collieries in the Satgram Area of Eastern Coalfields are: Kalidaspur, J.K.Nagar, Satgram, Ratibati, Chapui Khas, Mithapur, Nimcha, Jemehari, Pure Searsole, Tirath, Kuardih, Ardragram OCP and Seetaldasji OCP.

== Education ==
JK Nagar High School is a Bengali-medium coeducational institution established in 1966. It has facilities for teaching from class V to class XII. The school has 2 computers, a library with 1,000 books and a playground.

The Mini Children’s Wonderland is an English-medium coeducational institution established in 1990. It has facilities for teaching from class I to class XII.

Adarsh Sishu Sikshya Niketan is an English-medium coeducational institution established in 1980. It has facilities for teaching from class I to class XII.

There are 6 Hindi-medium primary schools (Saraswati Bal Mandir, Jemeri Free Primary Schools, Gyan Jyoti Hindi Primary School, JK Nagar Bazar Hindi Free Primary School, Sri Ram Vidyamandir, JK Nagar Junior Basic School (2)), 5 Bengali-medium primary schools (Karnani Sishu Siksha Kendra, Northbrook Sisu Siksha Kendra, JK Nagar Junior Basic School (1), Bankadanga Sishu Shiksha Kendra, Chalbalpur Free Primary School), 3 English-medium primary schools (Sri Primary School, Hans Light School, Little Flower Public School), and 1 Urdu-medium Primary school (JK Nagar Linepar Urdu Free Primary School), in and around JK Nagar/ Jemari.

== Healthcare ==
Medical facilities (hospitals and dispensaries) in the Satgram Area of ECL are available at Satgram Area Hospital (PO Devchandnagar) (with 30 beds), Satgram Project (PO Devchandnagar), Mithapur (PO Jamuria), Satgram Incline (PO Jamuria), Jamehari (PO Searsole Rajbari), JK Nagar (PO Bidhanbag), Nimcha (PO Nimcha), Amkola (PO Nimcha), Kalidaspur Project (PO Bhara Kalibari, Mejia), Jora Morh Colony (PO Bhara Kalibari, Mejia), Ratibati (PO Ratibati), Kuardih (PO Kalipahari), Chapui Khas (PO Chapui), Tirat (PO Kalipahari).
