= Narayankuri =

Narayankuri Narankuri
- Village
- Location in West Bengal, India Narayankuri (India)
- Coordinates: 23.59174°N 87.10122°E
- Country: India
- State: West Bengal
- District: Paschim Bardhaman

Population (2011)
  - Total: 2,176

Languages*
  - Official: Bengali, Hindi, English
- Time zone: UTC+5:30 (IST)
- PIN: 713323
- Telephone/STD code: 0341
- Vehicle registration: WB

Narayankuri (also spelled Narankuri, Naraincoory) is a village in the Raniganj (community development block) in the Asansol Sadar subdivision of the Paschim Bardhaman district in the state of West Bengal, India.

== History ==
During the middle of nineteenth century coal was being transported by boat from Narayankuri Ghat of Damodar river to Kolkata Carr, Tagore and Company, owned by Dwarakanath Tagore. However, this supply was not uniform and enough because the level of water varied in the river Damodar with the varying seasons. So as to capture this lucrative business of coal transportation that East Indian Railway laid the lines up to Raniganj in 1855.

Carr, Tagore and Company tried to establish themselves as the sole supplier of coal in Eastern India. In 1843, Jeremiah Homfray's mine at Naraincoory was taken over by Carr, Tagore and Company to form Bengal Coal Company. The British authorities were not happy with the near monopoly of Carr, Tagore and Company in the field of coal mining. Bengal's industrial development started taking off, powered by Bengal Coal Company's coal. After the formation of Bengal Coal Company, the coal industry started getting regularised.

== Economy ==
Narayankuri Opencast Mine in Kunustoria Area of Eastern Coalfields was started in 2023 with a tenure of 4 years and annual output: 0.50 million tonnes per annum and a total production of 1.69 million tonnes.

== Education ==
Narayankuri F.P. School was established in 1946.

== Healthcare ==
Ballavpur Rural Hospital, with 50 beds, is the major government medical facility in the Raniganj CD block. Raniganj Block Primary Health centre at Raniganj functions with 25 beds. There are primary health centres at Baktarnagar (with 6 beds) and Tirat (with 6 beds).
