= Charanpur =

- Location within West Bengal Location within India
- Coordinates: 23.74298°N 87.04585°E
- Country: India
- State: West Bengal
- District: Paschim Bardhaman
- Sub-division: Asansol subdivision

Area
  - Total: 2.63 km^{2} (1.02 sq mi)
  - Rank: No data found

Population (2001)
  - Total: 3,301
  - Density: 1,260/km^{2} (3,250/sq mi)
- Time zone: UTC+5:30 (IST)
- PIN: 713330
- Website: paschimbardhaman.co.in

Charanpur is a village in the Paschim Bardhaman district of West Bengal, India, about 9 kilometres (5.6 mi) from the industrial town of Asansol.

== Geography ==
Cities, towns and ECL Areas in the western portion of Asansol Sadar subdivision in Paschim Bardhaman district
MC: municipal corporation, P: rural administrative centre, CT: census town, N: neighbourhood, OG: out growth, T: temple
Owing to space constraints in the small map, the actual locations in a larger map may vary slightly

=== Location ===
Charanpur is classified as an Out Growth (OG) Urban Unit. It has an area of 2.63 square kilometres (1.02 sq mi). In 2001 the population was 3,301, of which 1,688 were male and 1,613 female. For postal delivery, Charanpur is a sub-office of the Jamuria Taluk. For other administrative purposes, it is within the Barabani community development block.

Pangachhiya, Majiara, Bhanowara, Domohani, Charanpur (OG), Ratibati and Chelad form a cluster of census towns and an outgrowth on the northern and eastern sides of Asansol.

=== Urbanisation ===
As per the 2011 census, 83.33% of the population of Asansol Sadar subdivision was urban and 16.67% was rural. In 2015, the municipal areas of Kulti, Raniganj and Jamuria were included within the jurisdiction of Asansol Municipal Corporation. Asansol Sadar subdivision has 26 (+1 partly) Census Towns.(partly presented in the map alongside; all places marked on the map are linked in the full-screen map).

== Asansol Urban Agglomeration ==
As per the 2011 census, the urban agglomeration (UA) centred upon Asansol had a population of 1,243,414. In addition to the erstwhile municipalities of Kulti, Jamuria, and Raniganj subsequently incorporated into the Asansol Municipal Corporation, the agglomeration included the census towns of Amkula, Baktarnagar, Ballavpur, Bhanowara, Domohani, Egara, Jemari (J.K. Nagar Township), Majiara, Murgathaul, Raghunathchak, Sahebganj and Topsi, and also Charanpur, an outgrowth of Jamuria.

== Coal mining ==
Formerly Charanpur was a coal mining location. It lay in the Raniganj coal field. There were two seams. The Koithee coal seam was 45 metres (148 ft) above the Poniati seam. An oblique fault cut across the two seams. In 1865 Apcar and Company was working a seam of coal 13 feet (4.0 m) deep near Charanpur. It held 12 feet (3.7 m) of fair coal. In 1891 the Apcar's Charanpur colliery was the first on the district to be lit by electric light. The Civil Engineering College at Sibpur began providing regular course of instruction in mining at the colliery in 1906.
