= Bhanowara =

Bhanora
- Census Town
- Location in West Bengal, India Bhanora (India)
- Coordinates: 23.738643°N 87.027553°E
- Country: India
- State: West Bengal
- District: Paschim Bardhaman

Area
  - Total: 4.11 km^{2} (1.59 sq mi)

Population (2011)
  - Total: 8,555
  - Density: 2,080/km^{2} (5,390/sq mi)

Languages*
  - Official: Bengali, Hindi, English
- Time zone: UTC+5:30 (IST)
- Vehicle registration: WB
- Website: paschimbardhaman.co.in

Bhanora is a census town in the Barabani CD block in the Asansol Sadar subdivision of the Paschim Bardhaman district in the state of West Bengal, India.

== Geography ==
Cities, towns and ECL Areas in the western portion of Asansol Sadar subdivision in Paschim Bardhaman district
MC: municipal corporation, P: rural administrative centre, CT: census town, N: neighbourhood, OG: out growth, T: temple
Owing to space constraints in the small map, the actual locations in a larger map may vary slightly

=== Location ===
Bhanora is located at 23°44′19″N 87°01′39″E.

Pangachhiya, Majiara, Bhanora, Domohani, Charanpur (OG), Ratibati and Chelad form a cluster of census towns and an outgrowth on the northern and eastern sides of Asansol.

=== Urbanisation ===
As per the 2011 census, 83.33% of the population of Asansol Sadar subdivision was urban and 16.67% was rural. In 2015, the municipal areas of Kulti, Raniganj and Jamuria were included within the jurisdiction of Asansol Municipal Corporation. Asansol Sadar subdivision has 26 (+1 partly) Census Towns.(partly presented in the map alongside; all places marked on the map are linked in the full-screen map).

== Demographics ==
According to the 2011 Census of India Bhanora had a total population of 8,855 of which 4,627 (52%) were males and 4,228 (48%) were females. Population in the age rage of 0–6 years was 1,188. The total number of literate persons in Bhanora was 5,452 (71.11% of the population over 6 years).

*For language details see Barabani (community development block)#Language and religion

According to the 2011 census, the urban agglomeration (UA) centred upon Asansol had a population of 1,243,414. In addition to the erstwhile municipalities of Kulti, Jamuria, and Raniganj subsequently incorporated into the Asansol Municipal Corporation, the agglomeration included the census towns of Amkula, Baktarnagar, Ballavpur, Bhanora, Domohani, Egara, Jemari (J.K. Nagar Township), Majiara, Murgathaul, Raghunathchak, Sahebganj and Topsi, and also Charanpur, an outgrowth of Jamuria.

As of 2001 India census, Bhanora had a population of 7,732. Males constitute 53% of the population and females 47%. Bhanora has an average literacy rate of 58%, lower than the national average of 59.5%; with male literacy of 68% and female literacy of 47%. 13% of the population is under 6 years of age.

== Infrastructure ==
According to the District Census Handbook 2011, Bardhaman, Bhanora covered an area of 4.11 km^{2}. Among the civic amenities, it had 13 km roads with open drains, the protected water supply involved overhead tank, tap water from treated sources. It had 1,020 domestic electric connections and 10 road lighting (points). Among the medical facilities it had 1 dispensary/ health centre. Among the educational facilities it had were 3 primary schools, the nearest middle school, secondary school and senior secondary school 3/4 km away, the nearest general degree college at Asansol 9 km away. Among the important commodities it produced was bricks. It had the branch office of 1 nationalised bank, 1 non-agricultural credit society.

== Economy ==
As per ECL website telephone numbers, operational collieries in the Sripur Area of Eastern Coalfields in 2018 are: Bhanora West Block Colliery, Girmint Colliery, New Ghusick Colliery, Kalipahari Colliery, Ningha Colliery and S.S.I. Colliery.

== Education ==
Bhanora has five primary schools.

== Healthcare ==
Medical facilities (dispensaries) in the Sripur Area of ECL are available at Nigha (PO Nigha), SSI Dispensary (PO Nigha), Kalipahari (PO Kalipahari), New Ghusick (PO Kalipahari), Muslia (PO Kalipahari), Dhamra (PO Kalipahari), Bhanora (PO Bhanora), Girmint (PO Bhanora), Sripur Area (PO Sripur Bazar), Sripur (PO Sripur Bazar), IME/PME (PO Sripur Bazar).
