= Nimsa =

- Census Town
- Location in West Bengal, India Nimsa (India)
- Coordinates: 23.720131°N 87.209291°E
- Country: India
- State: West Bengal
- District: Paschim Bardhaman

Area
  - Total: 4.0266 km^{2} (1.5547 sq mi)

Population (2011)
  - Total: 3,549
  - Density: 881.4/km^{2} (2,283/sq mi)

Languages*
  - Official: Bengali, Hindi, English
- Time zone: UTC+5:30 (IST)
- PIN: 713378
- Telephone code: 0341
- Vehicle registration: WB
- Lok Sabha constituency: Asansol
- Vidhan Sabha constituency: Jamuria
- Website: bardhaman.gov.in

Nimsa is a census town in the Jamuria CD block in the Asansol Sadar subdivision of the Paschim Bardhaman district in the Indian state of West Bengal.

== Geography ==
Cities and towns in the eastern portion of Asansol Sadar subdivision in Paschim Bardhaman district
MC: Municipal Corporation, CT: census town, N: neighbourhood, R: rural centre
Owing to space constraints in the small map, the actual locations in a larger map may vary slightly

=== Location ===
Nimsa is located at 23.72519°N 87.199974°E

=== Urbanisation ===
According to the 2011 census, 83.33% of the population of Asansol Sadar subdivision was urban and 16.67% was rural. In 2015, the municipal areas of Kulti, Raniganj and Jamuria were included within the jurisdiction of Asansol Municipal Corporation. Asansol Sadar subdivision has 26 (+1 partly) Census Towns.(partly presented in the map alongside; all places marked on the map are linked in the full-screen map).

== Demographics ==
According to the 2011 Census of India, Nimsa had a total population of 3,459 of which 1,813 (52%) were males and 1,646 (48%) were females. Population in the age range of 0–6 years was 403. The total number of literate persons in Nimsa was 2,074 (67.87% of the population over 6 years).

*For language details see Jamuria (community development block)#Language and religion

== Infrastructure ==
According to the District Census Handbook 2011, Bardhaman, Nimsa covered an area of 4.0266 km^{2}. Among the civic amenities, it had 7 km roads with open drains, the protected water supply involved service reservoir, tap water from treated sources, uncovered wells. It had 517 domestic electric connections and 37 road lighting (points). Among the medical facilities it had 1 medicine shop. Among the educational facilities it had were 3 primary schools, 1 middle school, 1 secondary school, 1 senior secondary school, the nearest general degree college at Pandaveswar 8 km away. Among the important commodities it manufactured were coal and paddy.

== Economy ==
As per ECL website telephone numbers, operational collieries in the Kenda Area of Eastern Coalfields in 2018 are: Bahula Colliery, Chora Block Incline, CI Jambad Colliery, Chora OCP, Haripur Colliery, Lower Kenda Colliery, New Kenda Colliery, Siduli Colliery, SK OCP, West Kenda OCP.

== Education ==
Nimsha Khottadih Alinagar High School is a Bengali-medium coeducational institution established in 1965. It has facilities for teaching from class V to class XII. The school has 10 computers and a library with 116 books.

Bhuri Farfari S. Junior High School is a Bengali-medium coeducational institution established in 2009. It has facilities for teaching from class V to class VIII.

There are Bengali-medium and Hindi-medium primary schools in the area.
