= Kunustara =

Kunustara Kunustoria
- Census Town
- Location in West Bengal, India Kunustara (India)
- Coordinates: 23.657711°N 87.117422°E
- Country: India
- State: West Bengal
- District: Paschim Bardhaman

Area
  - Total: 3.18 km^{2} (1.23 sq mi)

Population (2011)
  - Total: 5,127
  - Density: 1,610/km^{2} (4,180/sq mi)

Languages*
  - Official: Bengali, Hindi, English
- Time zone: UTC+5:30 (IST)
- Vehicle registration: WB
- Website: bardhaman.gov.in

Kunustara (also called Kunustoria) is a census town in the Jamuria CD block in the Asansol Sadar subdivision of the Paschim Bardhaman district in the Indian state of West Bengal.

== Geography ==
Cities and towns in the eastern portion of Asansol Sadar subdivision in Paschim Bardhaman district
MC: Municipal Corporation, CT: census town, N: neighbourhood, R: rural centre
Owing to space constraints in the small map, the actual locations in a larger map may vary slightly

=== Location ===
Kunustoria is located at 23°39′28″N 87°07′03″E.

The Asansol-Durgapur region is composed of undulating laterite soil. This area lies between the Damodar River and the Ajay River. The discovery of coal led to industrialisation of the area and most of the forests have been cleared.

=== Urbanisation ===
As per the 2011 census, 83.33% of the population of Asansol Sadar subdivision was urban and 16.67% was rural. In 2015, the municipal areas of Kulti, Raniganj and Jamuria were included within the jurisdiction of Asansol Municipal Corporation. Asansol Sadar subdivision has 26 (+1 partly) Census Towns.(partly presented in the map alongside; all places marked on the map are linked in the full-screen map).

== Demographics ==
According to the 2011 Census of India, Kunustara had a total population of 5,127 of which 2,720 (53%) were males and 2,407 (47%) were females. Population in the age range 0–6 years was 587. The total number of literate persons in Kunustoria was 3,451 (76.01% of the population over 6 years).

*For language details see Jamuria (community development block)#Language and religion

As of 2001 India census, Kunustoria had a population of 5,416. Males constitute 56% of the population and females 44%. Kunustoria has an average literacy rate of 67%, higher than the national average of 59.5%: male literacy is 77%, and female literacy is 55%. In Kunustoria, 13% of the population is under 6 years of age.

== Infrastructure ==
According to the District Census Handbook 2011, Bardhaman, Kunustara covered an area of 3.18 km^{2}. Among the civic amenities, it had 3 km roads with both open and covered drains, the protected water supply involved overhead tank, service reservoir, tap water from treated sources, covered wells. It had 203 domestic electric connections and 70 road lighting (points). Among the medical facilities it had 1 dispensary/ health centre. Among the educational facilities it had were 3 primary schools. Among the social, recreational and cultural facilities, it had 1 stadium, 1 auditorium/ community hall. It had the branch office of 1 nationalised bank, 1 cooperative bank and 1 non-agricultural credit society.

== Economy ==
As per ECL website telephone numbers, operational collieries in the Kunustoria Area of Eastern Coalfields in 2018 are: Amritnagar Colliery, Amrasota Colliery, Bansra Colliery, Belbaid Colliery, Kunustoria Colliery, Mahabir OCP, North Searsole Colliery, Parasea Colliery, Parasea 6 & 7 Incline and Parasea OCP.

== Education ==
Kunustoria has two primary schools. They provide mid day meals to the student like kichri which provide the poorer section an incentive to send their children to school for education as well as for food.

== Healthcare ==
Medical facilities in the Kunustoria Area of ECL are available at Kunstoria Area Hospital (with 50 beds) (Banshra), Parasea Colliery (PO Parasea), Belbaid Colliery (PO Parasea), Kunustoria Colliery (PO Toposi), North Searsole Colliery (PO Bijpur), Bansra Colliery (PO Banshra), Amritnagar Colliery (PO Raniganj), Mahabir Colliery (PO Raniganj).
