= Banshra =

Bansra
- Census Town
- Location in West Bengal, India Bansra (India)
- Coordinates: 23.636513°N 87.12794°E
- Country: India
- State: West Bengal
- District: Paschim Bardhaman

Area
  - Total: 3.01 km^{2} (1.16 sq mi)

Population (2011)
  - Total: 5,703
  - Density: 1,890/km^{2} (4,910/sq mi)

Languages*
  - Official: Bengali, Hindi, English
- Time zone: UTC+5:30 (IST)
- PIN: 713358
- Vehicle registration: WB
- Website: bardhaman.gov.in

Bansra is a census town in the Raniganj CD block of the Asansol Sadar subdivision in the Paschim Bardhaman district in the state of West Bengal, India.

== Geography ==
Cities and towns in the eastern portion of Asansol Sadar subdivision in Paschim Bardhaman district
MC: Municipal Corporation, CT: census town, N: neighbourhood, R: rural centre
Owing to space constraints in the small map, the actual locations in a larger map may vary slightly

=== Location ===
Bansra is located at 23°38′11″N 87°07′41″E.

Jemari (J.K. Nagar Township), Belebathan, Murgathaul, Amkula, Egara, Sahebganj, Raghunathchak and Ballavpur form a cluster of census towns on the western and southern side of Raniganj. Banshra and Baktarnagar are adjacent to Raniganj on the eastern side.

=== Urbanisation ===
According to the 2011 census, 83.33% of the population of Asansol Sadar subdivision was urban and 16.67% was rural. In 2015, the municipal areas of Kulti, Raniganj and Jamuria were included within the jurisdiction of Asansol Municipal Corporation. Asansol Sadar subdivision has 26 (+1 partly) Census Towns.(partly presented in the map alongside; all places marked on the map are linked in the full-screen map).

== Demographics ==
According to the 2011 Census of India, Banshra had a total population of 5,703 of which 3,001 (53%) were males and 2,702 (47%) were females. Population in the age range 0–6 years was 731. The total number of literate persons in Banshra was 3,746 (73.34% of the population over 6 years).

*For language details see Raniganj (community development block)#Language and religion

As of 2001 India census, Bansra had a population of 5,128. Males constitute 55% of the population and females 45%. Bansra has an average literacy rate of 60%, higher than the national average of 59.5%; with 63% of the literates being male and 37% being female. 12% of the population is under 6 years of age.

== Infrastructure ==
According to the District Census Handbook 2011, Bardhaman, Banshra covered an area of 3.01 km^{2}. Among the civic amenities, it had 4.8 km roads with open drains, the protected water-supply involved overhead tank, tap water from treated sources, uncovered wells. It had 305 domestic electric connections. Among the educational facilities it had were 2 primary schools, 1 middle school, the nearest secondary, senior secondary schools at Raniganj 6 km away. Among the social, recreational and cultural facilities it had 1 public library. It had the branch office of 1 cooperative bank.

== Economy ==
Collieries in the Kunustoria Area of Eastern Coalfields are: Amritnagar, Amrasota, Mahabir, North Searsole, Kunustoria, Banshra, Topsi, Belbaid, Parasea 6&7, Parasea, Banshra OCP and Parasea OCP.

Ghutiary Sharrif B.M. Vidyapith High School is a Bengali-medium coeducational school. It was established in 1965 and has facilities for teaching from class V to class XII.

Ghutiary Sharrif Balika Vidyalaya High School is a Bengali-medium school for girls. It was established in 1936 and has facilities for teaching from class V to class XII.

Banshra Ghutiary Sharrif Girls High School is a Bengali-medium coeducational school. It was established in 1949 and has facilities for teaching from class V to class XII.

Hari-Har Mahavidyalaya is a Bengali-medium school. It was established in 1933 and has facilities for teaching from class XI to class XII.

== Healthcare ==
The 50-bedded Bansra Hospital of Eastern Coalfields is located at Bansra.

Medical facilities in the Kunustoria Area of ECL are available at Kunstoria Area Hospital (with 50 beds) (Banshra), Parasea Colliery (PO Parasea), Belbaid Colliery (PO Parasea), Kunustoria Colliery (PO Toposi), North Searsole Colliery (PO Bijpur), Bansra Colliery (PO Banshra), Amritnagar Colliery (PO Raniganj), Mahabir Colliery (PO Raniganj).

== Education ==
Ghutiary Sharrif B.M. Vidyapith High School is a Bengali-medium coeducational school. It was established in 1965 and has facilities for teaching from class V to class XII.

Ghutiary Sharrif Balika Vidyalaya High School is a Bengali-medium school for girls. It was established in 1936 and has facilities for teaching from class V to class XII.

Ghutiary Sharrif Girls High School is a Bengali-medium coeducational school. It was established in 1949 and has facilities for teaching from class V to class XII.

Hari-Har Mahavidyalaya near Gourdaha is a Bengali-medium school. It was established in 1933 and has facilities for teaching from class XI to class XII.
