= Domohani =

- Census Town
- Location in West Bengal, India Domohani (India)
- Coordinates: 23°45′25.0″N 87°01′32.2″E
- Country: India
- State: West Bengal
- District: Paschim Bardhaman

Area
  - Total: 6.3789 km^{2} (2.4629 sq mi)

Population (2011)
  - Total: 12,480
  - Density: 1,956/km^{2} (5,067/sq mi)

Languages*
  - Official: Bengali, Hindi, English
- Time zone: UTC+5:30 (IST)
- PIN: 713334
- Telephone code: 0341
- Vehicle registration: WB
- Lok Sabha constituency: Asansol
- Vidhan Sabha constituency: Barabani
- Website: paschimbardhaman.co.in

Domohani is a census town in the Barabani CD block in the Asansol Sadar subdivision of the Paschim Bardhaman district in the state of West Bengal, India.

== Geography ==
Cities, towns and ECL Areas in the western portion of Asansol Sadar subdivision in Paschim Bardhaman district
MC: municipal corporation, P: rural administrative centre, CT: census town, N: neighbourhood, OG: out growth, T: temple
Owing to space constraints in the small map, the actual locations in a larger map may vary slightly

=== Location ===
Pangachhiya, Majiara, Bhanowara, Domohani, Charanpur (OG), Ratibati and Chelad form a cluster of census towns and an outgrowth on the northern and eastern side of Asansol.

=== Urbanisation ===
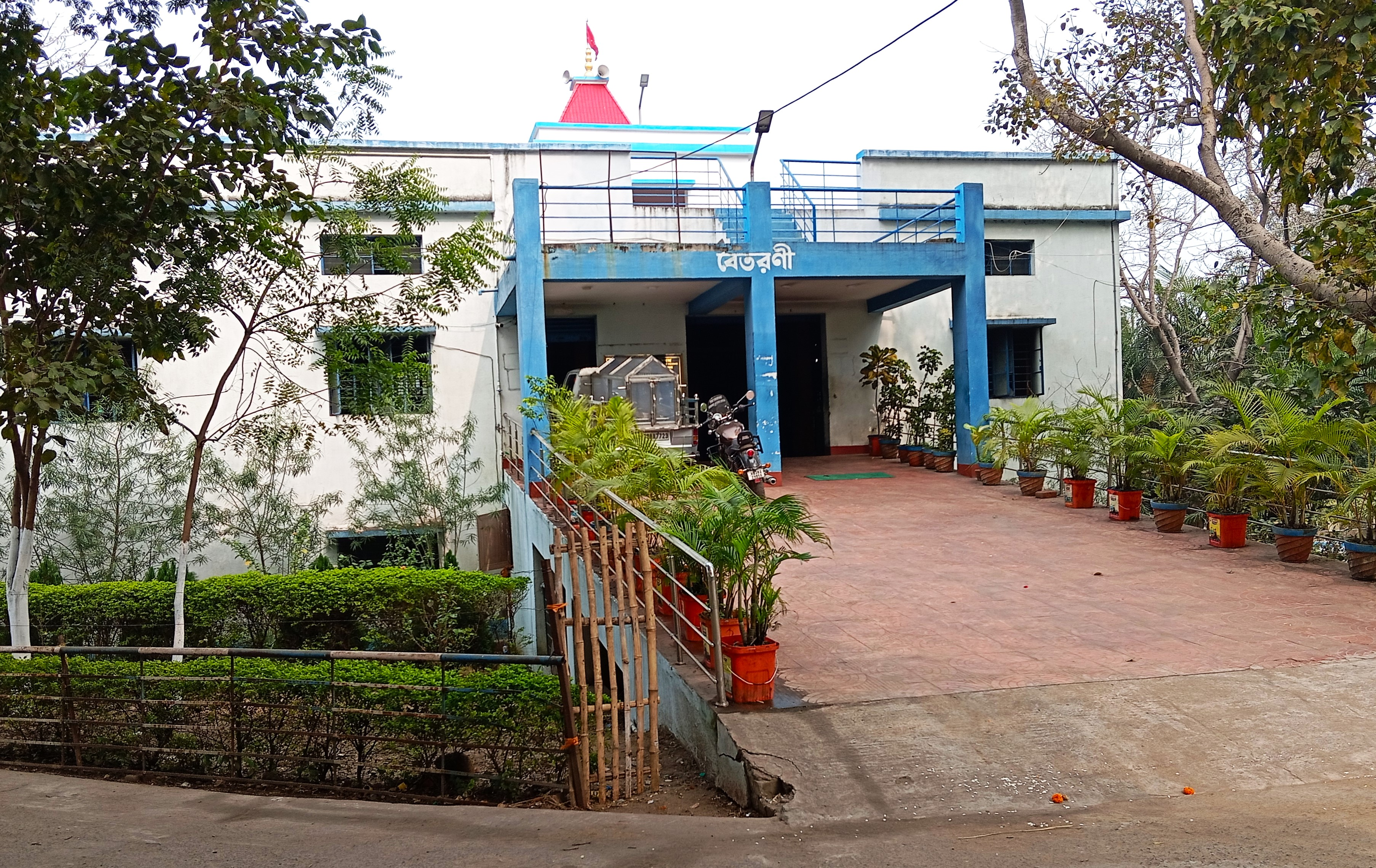
Domohani Burning Ghat

As per the 2011 census, 83.33% of the population of Asansol Sadar subdivision was urban and 16.67% was rural. In 2015, the municipal areas of Kulti, Raniganj and Jamuria were included within the jurisdiction of Asansol Municipal Corporation. Asansol Sadar subdivision has 26 (+1 partly) Census Towns.(partly presented in the map alongside; all places marked on the map are linked in the full-screen map).

== Civic Administration ==
=== CD block HQ ===
The headquarters of Barabani CD block are located at Domohani Bazar.

== Demographics ==
According to the 2011 Census of India Domohani had a total population of 12,480 of which 6,413 (51%) were males and 6,067 (49%) were females. Population in the age range 0–6 years was 1,558. The total number of literate persons in Domohani was 8,103 (74.19% of the population over 6 years).

*For language details see Barabani (community development block)#Language and religion

According to the 2011 census, the urban agglomeration (UA) centred upon Asansol had a population of 1,243,414. In addition to the erstwhile municipalities of Kulti, Jamuria, and Raniganj subsequently incorporated into the Asansol Municipal Corporation, the agglomeration included the census towns of Amkula, Baktarnagar, Ballavpur, Bhanowara, Domohani, Egara, Jemari (J.K. Nagar Township), Majiara, Murgathaul, Raghunathchak, Sahebganj and Topsi, and also Charanpur, an outgrowth of Jamuria.

== Infrastructure ==
According to the District Census Handbook 2011, Bardhaman, Domohani covered an area of 6.3789 km^{2}. Among the civic amenities, it had 5 km roads with both open and covered drains, the protected water supply involved overhead tank, tap water from treated sources, borewell/ tubewell. It had 675 domestic electric connections. Among the medical facilities it had 1 hospital, 2 dispensary/ health centres, 3 medicine shops. Among the educational facilities it had were 5 primary schools, 1 middle school, 1 secondary school, 1 senior secondary school, the nearest general degree college at Asansol 12 km away. It had 1 non-formal education centre (Sarva Shiksha Abhiyan). Among the important commodities it produced were bricks, briquettes, sweets.

== Transport ==
Several roads converge on Domohani: Nazrul Sarani (earlier known as Domohani Road), Churulia Road, Domohani-Jamuria Road, Domohani Bazar-Lalganj Road.

== Education ==
Domohani Kelejora High School is a Bengali-medium boys only institution established in 1938. It has facilities for teaching from class V to class XII. The school has 8 computers, a library with 200 books and a playground.

Domohani Kelejora Girls’ High School is a Bengali-medium girls only institution established in 1963. It has facilities for teaching from class V to class XII. The school has a library with 1,500 books and a playground.

Singhabahini Junior High School is a Bengali-medium coeducational institution established in 2008. It has facilities for teaching from class V to class VIII.

Domohani Hindi UP School is a Hindi-medium coeducational institution established in 2008. It has facilities for teaching from class V to class VIII.

Domohani has Bengali-medium, Hindi-medium and Urdu-medium primary schools.

== Healthcare ==
Kelejora Rural Hospital, with 30 beds, at Kelejora, PO Domohani Bazar, is the major government medical facility in the Barabani CD block. There are primary health centres at Domohani (with 10 beds), Lalganj (with 2 beds), Nuni (with 6 beds) and Panuria (with 6 beds).
