= Murgathaul =

- Census Town
- Location in West Bengal, India Murgathaul (India)
- Coordinates: 23.625819°N 87.069575°E
- Country: India
- State: West Bengal
- District: Paschim Bardhaman

Area
  - Total: 2.12 km^{2} (0.82 sq mi)

Population (2011)
  - Total: 7,371
  - Density: 3,480/km^{2} (9,010/sq mi)

Languages
  - Official: Bengali, Hindi, English
- Time zone: UTC+5:30 (IST)
- PIN: 713323
- Telephone code: 0341
- Vehicle registration: WB
- Website: paschimbardhaman.co.in

Murgathaul is a census town in the Raniganj CD block in the Asansol Sadar subdivision of the Paschim Bardhaman district in the Indian state of West Bengal.

== Geography ==
Cities and towns in the eastern portion of Asansol Sadar subdivision in Paschim Bardhaman district
MC: Municipal Corporation, CT: census town, N: neighbourhood, R: rural centre
Owing to space constraints in the small map, the actual locations in a larger map may vary slightly

=== Location ===
Murgathaul is located at 23°37′33″N 87°04′10″E.

Jemari (J.K. Nagar Township), Belebathan, Murgathaul, Amkula, Egara, Sahebganj, Raghunathchak and Ballavpur form a cluster of census towns on the western and southern side of Raniganj. Banshra and Baktarnagar are adjacent to Raniganj on the eastern side.

=== Urbanisation ===
According to the 2011 census, 83.33% of the population of Asansol Sadar subdivision was urban and 16.67% was rural. In 2015, the municipal areas of Kulti, Raniganj and Jamuria were included within the jurisdiction of Asansol Municipal Corporation. Asansol Sadar subdivision has 26 (+1 partly) Census Towns.(partly presented in the map alongside; all places marked on the map are linked in the full-screen map).

== Demographics ==
According to the 2011 Census of India, Murgathaul had a total population of 7,371 of which 3,920 (53%) were males and 3,451 (47%) were females. Population in the age range 0–6 years was 1,031. The total number of literate persons in Murgathaul was 4,682 (73.85% of the population over 6 years).

*For language details see Raniganj (community development block)#Language and religion

As of 2001 India census, Murgathaul had a population of 7,872. Males constitute 55% of the population and females 45%. Murgathaul has an average literacy rate of 53%, lower than the national average of 59.5%: male literacy is 64%, and female literacy is 39%. In Murgathaul, 15% of the population is under 6 years of age.

According to the 2011 census, the urban agglomeration (UA) centred upon Asansol had a population of 1,243,414. In addition to the erstwhile municipalities of Kulti, Jamuria, and Raniganj subsequently incorporated into the Asansol Municipal Corporation, the agglomeration included the census towns of Amkula, Baktarnagar, Ballavpur, Bhanowara, Domohani, Egara, Jemari (J.K. Nagar Township), Majiara, Murgathaul, Raghunathchak, Sahebganj and Topsi, and also Charanpur, an outgrowth of Jamuria.

== Infrastructure ==
According to the District Census Handbook 2011, Bardhaman, Murgathaul covered an area of 2.12 km^{2}. Among the civic amenities, it had 1.5 km roads with open drains, the protected water-supply involved overhead tank, tapwater from treated sources. It had 105 domestic electric connections and 21 road lighting (points). The nearest dispensary/ health centre or other medical facility was 4 km away. Among the educational facilities it had were 4 primary schools, 1 secondary school, the nearest senior secondary school at Raniganj 6 km away. It had 6 non-formal education centres (Sarva Shiksha Abhiyan).

== Economy ==
It is in the heart of the coal mining zone.

Collieries in the Satgram Area of Eastern Coalfields are: Kalidaspur, J.K.Nagar, Satgram, Ratibati, Chapui Khas, Mithapur, Nimcha, Jemehari, Pure Searsole, Tirath, Kuardih, Ardragram OCP and Seetaldasji OCP.

== Education ==
Harabhanga Vivekananda Junior High School is a Bengali-medium coeducational institution established in 2009. It has facilities for teaching from class V to class VIII.
