= Barabani =

- Village
- Location in West Bengal, India Barabani (India)
- Coordinates: 23°45′24.8″N 86°59′59.8″E
- Country: India
- State: West Bengal
- District: Paschim Bardhaman

Population (2011)
  - Total: 2,330

Languages*
  - Official: Bengali, Hindi, English
- Time zone: UTC+5:30 (IST)
- PIN: 713334 (Domahani Bazar)
- Telephone/STD code: 0341
- Lok Sabha constituency: Asansol
- Vidhan Sabha constituency: Barabani
- Website: paschimbardhaman.co.in

Barabani is a village, in the Barabani CD block in the Asansol Sadar subdivision of the Paschim Bardhaman district in the state of West Bengal, India.

== Geography ==
Cities, towns and ECL Areas in the western portion of Asansol Sadar subdivision in Paschim Bardhaman district
MC: municipal corporation, P: rural administrative centre, CT: census town, N: neighbourhood, OG: out growth, T: temple
Owing to space constraints in the small map, the actual locations in a larger map may vary slightly

=== Urbanisation ===
As per the 2011 census, 83.33% of the population of Asansol Sadar subdivision was urban and 16.67% was rural. In 2015, the municipal areas of Kulti, Raniganj and Jamuria were included within the jurisdiction of Asansol Municipal Corporation. Asansol Sadar subdivision has 26 (+1 partly) Census Towns.(partly presented in the map alongside; all places marked on the map are linked in the full-screen map).

== Civic administration ==
=== Police station ===
Barabani police station has jurisdiction over Barabani CD block. The area covered is 158.87 km^{2} and the population covered is 110,361.

== Demographics ==
According to the 2011 Census of India Barabani had a total population of 2,330 of which 1,233 (53%) were males and 1,097 (47%) were females. Population in the age range 0–6 years was 303. The total number of literate persons in Barabani was 1,204 (59.40% of the population over 6 years).

*For language details see Barabani (community development block)#Language and religion

== Transport ==
There is a station on the Andal-Jamuria-Sitarampur branch line.
