= Sukumar Bannerjee =

Indian revolutionary (1913–1938)

Sukamar Bannerjee
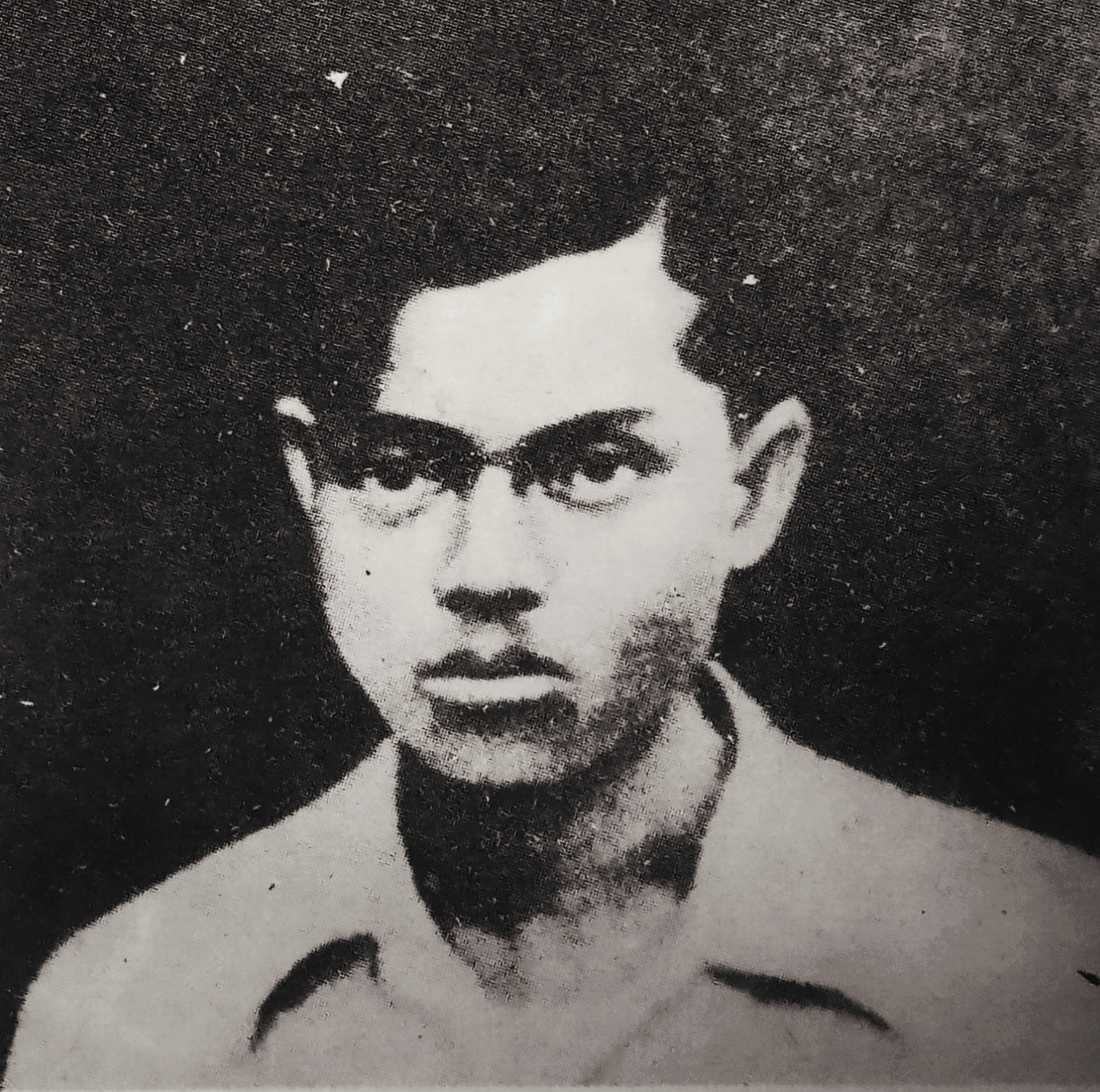
- Sukamar Bannerjee
- Born: 25 June 1913; Bollavpur estate of Raniganj, Asansol district, West Bengal.
- Died: 15 November 1938 (aged 28); Raniganj, Asansol district of West Bengal
- Other names: Sukumar Bandhopadhay
- Occupation: Assistant Secretary of Raniganj Paper Mill
- Known for: Indian freedom movement
- Notable work

Sukumar Bannerjee (25 June 1913 – 15 November 1938) was an Indian revolutionary from West Bengal. He is known mainly for his martyrdom while protesting against the British officers at the Raniganj Paper Mill.

== Early life and career ==
Sukumar was born on 25 June 1910 in the Ballavpur estate of Raniganj, present day Kuldiha. At the age of 22, he worked as an assistant secretary at the Raniganj paper mill.

== Death ==
On 15 November 1938, a British Officer in Raniganj Paper mill, in an attempt to break the non-cooperation movement there, was trying to harass the movement leaders, with the police officers. Sukamar tried to resist him and the British officer drove his lorry over Sukumar killing him instantly. He became a martyr in the cause of the non-cooperation movement in Raniganj.

== Legacy ==
Sahid Sukumar Bandhopadhay Sarani in Bidhannagar, Durgapur, West Bengal, is named after him. There has also been a school, a market complex and a library named after him.
