= Ballavpur =

- Census Town
- Location in West Bengal, India Ballavpur (India)
- Coordinates: 23.584293°N 87.116954°E
- Country: India
- State: West Bengal
- District: Paschim Bardhaman

Area
  - Total: 1.67 km^{2} (0.64 sq mi)

Population (2011)
  - Total: 6,468
  - Density: 3,870/km^{2} (10,000/sq mi)

Languages*
  - Official: Bengali, Hindi, English
- Time zone: UTC+5:30 (IST)
- PIN: 713323
- Telephone/STD code: 0341
- Vehicle registration: WB
- Website: paschimbardhaman.co.in

Ballavpur is a census town in the Raniganj CD block in the Asansol Sadar subdivision of the Paschim Bardhaman district in the state of West Bengal, India.

== Geography ==
Cities and towns in the eastern portion of Asansol Sadar subdivision in Paschim Bardhaman district
MC: Municipal Corporation, CT: census town, N: neighbourhood, R: rural centre
Owing to space constraints in the small map, the actual locations in a larger map may vary slightly

=== Location ===
Ballavpur is located at 23.584293°N 87.116954°E.

Jemari (J.K. Nagar Township), Belebathan, Murgathaul, Amkula, Egara, Sahebganj, Raghunathchak and Ballavpur form a cluster of census towns on the western and southern side of Raniganj. Banshra and Baktarnagar are adjacent to Raniganj on the eastern side.

=== Urbanisation ===
According to the 2011 census, 83.33% of the population of the Asansol Sadar subdivision was urban and 16.67% was rural. In 2015, the municipal areas of Kulti, Raniganj and Jamuria were included within the jurisdiction of Asansol Municipal Corporation. Asansol Sadar subdivision has 26 (+1 partly) Census Towns.(partly presented in the map alongside; all places marked on the map are linked in the full-screen map).

== Demographics ==
According to the 2011 Census of India, Ballavpur had a total population of 6,468 of which 3,399 (53%) were males and 3,069 (47%) were females. Population in the age range 0–6 years was 687. The total number of literate persons in Ballavpur was 4,680 (80.95% of the population over 6 years).

*For language details see Raniganj (community development block)#Language and religion

According to the 2011 census, the urban agglomeration (UA) centred upon Asansol had a population of 1,243,414. In addition to the erstwhile municipalities of Kulti, Jamuria, and Raniganj subsequently incorporated into the Asansol Municipal Corporation, the agglomeration included the census towns of Amkula, Baktarnagar, Ballavpur, Bhanowara, Domohani, Egara, Jemari (J.K. Nagar Township), Majiara, Murgathaul, Raghunathchak, Sahebganj and Topsi, and also Charanpur, an outgrowth of Jamuria.

As of 2001 India census, Ballavpur had a population of 5,391. Males constitute 53% of the population and females 47%. Ballavpur has an average literacy rate of 65%, higher than the national average of 59.5%; with 61% of the males and 39% of females literate. 10% of the population is under 6 years of age.

== Infrastructure ==
According to the District Census Handbook 2011, Bardhaman, Ballavpur covered an area of 1.67 km^{2}. Among the civic amenities, it had 14 km roads with open drains, the protected water-supply involved tap water from untreated sources. It had 342 domestic electric connections. Among the medical facilities it had were 1 family welfare centre, 1 maternity and child welfare centre. Among the educational facilities it had were 4 primary schools, 1 middle school, 1 secondary school, the nearest senior secondary school, general degree college at Raniganj 3 km away. It had 1 non-formal education centre (Sarba Siksha Abhiyan). Among the social, recreational and cultural facilities, it had 1 public library. It had the branch office of 1 nationalised bank.

== Economy ==
Bengal Paper Mills was set up at Ballavpur in 1887. At the time of independence it was producing 11,760 tonnes of paper. The mill was closed in 1999.

As of 2017, Bengal Paper Mills Co. Ltd. is under liquidation. The EMTA group, which had taken over the assets of the closed paper mill, has renamed the company as Ballavpur Paper Manfg. Ltd., invested handsomely to revive production and is using the traditional Tiger brand. It started production in February 2009 and subsequently raised it.

== Education ==
Ballavpur Ramgopal Saraf Vidyapith is a Bengali-medium coeducational institution established in 1965. It has facilities for teaching from class V to class XII. The school has 11 computers, a library with 1,000 books and a playground.

Ballavpur R.C. Junior High School is a Hindi-medium coeducational institution established in 2009. It has facilities for teaching from class V to class VIII.

Ballavpur has Bengali-medium primary schools (Belunia Free Primary School, Ballavpur Free Primary School, Unit II, New Madanpur Free Primary School, Ballavpur Village Free Primary School, Unit I, Bengal Paper Mill Free Primary School, Nopur Junior Basic School, Nopur Majhipara Sishu Shiksha Kendra), Hindi-medium primary school (Adarsh Hindi School) and Urdu-medium primary school (Ballavpur Urdu Free Primary School).

== Healthcare ==
Ballavpur Rural Hospital, with 50 beds, is the major government medical facility in the Raniganj CD block. Raniganj Block Primary Health centre at Raniganj functions with 25 beds. There are primary health centres at Baktarnagar (with 6 beds) and Tirat (with 6 beds).
