= Baktarnagar =

- Census Town
- Location in West Bengal, India Baktarnagar (India)
- Coordinates: 23.598307°N 87.144583°E
- Country: India
- State: West Bengal
- District: Paschim Bardhaman

Area
  - Total: 4.2169 km^{2} (1.6282 sq mi)

Population (2011)
  - Total: 5,112
  - Density: 1,212/km^{2} (3,140/sq mi)

Languages*
  - Official: Bengali, Hindi, English
- Time zone: UTC+5:30 (IST)
- PIN: 713347
- Telephone code: 0341
- Vehicle registration: WB
- Lok Sabha constituency: Asansol
- Vidhan Sabha constituency: Asansol Dakshin
- Website: paschimbardhaman.co.in

Baktarnagar is a census town in the Raniganj CD block in the Asansol Sadar subdivision of the Paschim Bardhaman district in the Indian state of West Bengal.

== Geography ==
Cities and towns in the eastern portion of Asansol Sadar subdivision in Paschim Bardhaman district
MC: Municipal Corporation, CT: census town, N: neighbourhood, R: rural centre
Owing to space constraints in the small map, the actual locations in a larger map may vary slightly

=== Location ===
Baktarnagar is located at 23.598307°N 87.144583°E

Jemari (J.K. Nagar Township), Belebathan, Murgathaul, Amkula, Egara, Sahebganj, Raghunathchak and Ballavpur form a cluster of census towns on the western and southern side of Raniganj. Banshra and Baktarnagar are adjacent to Raniganj on the eastern side.

=== Urbanisation ===
According to the 2011 census, 83.33% of the population of the Asansol Sadar subdivision was urban and 16.67% was rural. In 2015, the municipal areas of Kulti, Raniganj and Jamuria were included within the jurisdiction of Asansol Municipal Corporation. Asansol Sadar subdivision has 26 (+1 partly) Census Towns.(partly presented in the map alongside; all places marked on the map are linked in the full-screen map).

== Demographics ==
According to the 2011 Census of India, Baktarnagar had a total population of 5,112 of which 2,643 (52%) were males and 2,469 (48%) were females. Population in the age range 0–6 years was 610. The total number of literate persons in Baktarnagar was 3,221 (71.55% of the population over 6 years).

*For language details see Raniganj (community development block)#Language and religion

According to the 2011 census, the urban agglomeration (UA) centred upon Asansol had a population of 1,243,414. In addition to the erstwhile municipalities of Kulti, Jamuria, and Raniganj subsequently incorporated into the Asansol Municipal Corporation, the agglomeration included the census towns of Amkula, Baktarnagar, Ballavpur, Bhanowara, Domohani, Egara, Jemari (J.K. Nagar Township), Majiara, Murgathaul, Raghunathchak, Sahebganj and Topsi, and also Charanpur, an outgrowth of Jamuria.

== Infrastructure ==
According to the District Census Handbook 2011, Bardhaman, Baktarnagar covered an area of 4.2169 km^{2} (1.6282 sq mi). Among the civic amenities, it had 14 km roads with open drains, the protected water-supply involved overhead tank, tapwater from treated source. It had 315 domestic electric connections. Among the medical facilities it had was 1 medicine shop. Among the educational facilities it had were 3 primary schools, 1 middle school, 1 secondary school, the nearest senior secondary school at Raniganj 4 km away. It had 1 non-formal education centre (Sarva Shiksha Abhiyan). Among the social, recreational and cultural facilities, it had 1 public library.

== Economy ==
As per the ECL website telephone numbers, operational collieries in the Satgram Area in 2018 are: Chapui Khas Colliery, JK Nagar Project, Jemehari Colliery, Kalidaspur Project, Kuardi Colliery, Nimcha Colliery, Pure Searsole Colliery, Ratibati Colliery, Satgram Project and Satgram Incline.

== Transport ==
Baktarnagar has a station in the Bardhaman-Asansol section.

== Education ==
Baktarnagar High School is a Bengali-medium coeducational institution established in 1983. It has facilities for teaching from class V to class XII. The school has a 1 computer, a library with 500 books and a playground.
