= Asansol Sadar subdivision =

- Subdivision
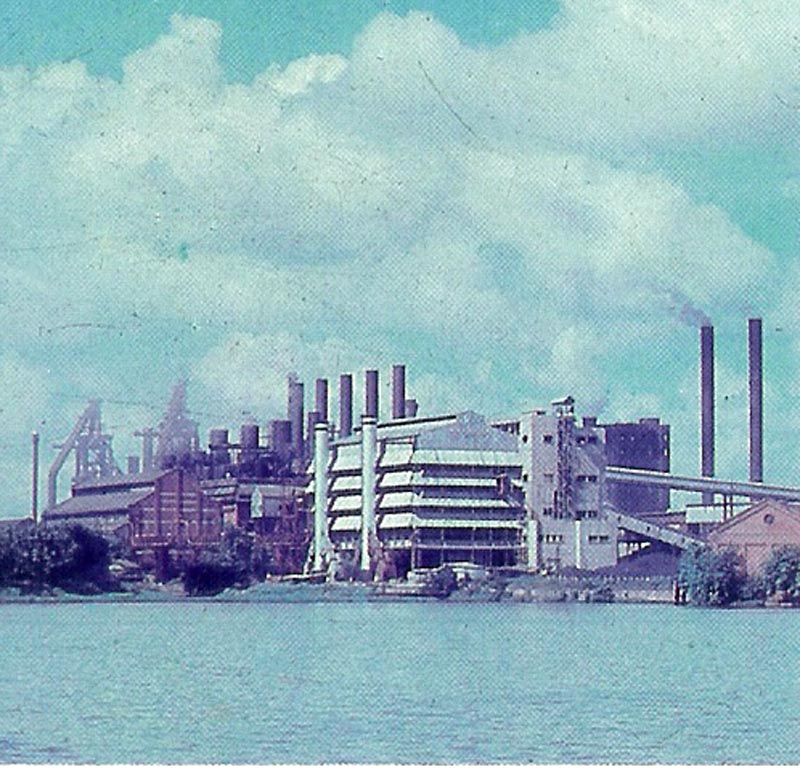
- Panoramic view of the old IISCO Plant

- Coordinates: 23.68°N 86.98°E
- Country: India
- State: West Bengal
- District: Paschim Bardhaman district
- Headquarters: Asansol

Area
  - Total: 831.89 km^{2} (321.19 sq mi)

Population
  - Total: 1,672,659
  - Density: 2,010.7/km^{2} (5,207.6/sq mi)

Languages
  - Official: Bengali, English
- Time zone: UTC+5:30 (IST)
- ISO 3166 code: IN-WB
- Website: http://bardhaman.gov.in/

Asansol Sadar subdivision is an administrative subdivision of the Paschim Bardhaman district in the state of West Bengal, India.

== Overview ==
Asansol Sadar subdivision is part of the Ajay Damodar Barakar tract. This area is sort of an extension of the Chota Nagpur Plateau. It is a rocky undulating area with laterite soil, with the Ajay on the north, the Damodar on the south and the Barakar on the west. For ages the area was heavily forested and infested with plunderers and marauders. The discovery of coal in the 18th century led to industrialisation of the area and most of the forests have been cleared. Maithon Dam of Damodar Valley Corporation, located in Jharkhand, is on the border of this subdivision.

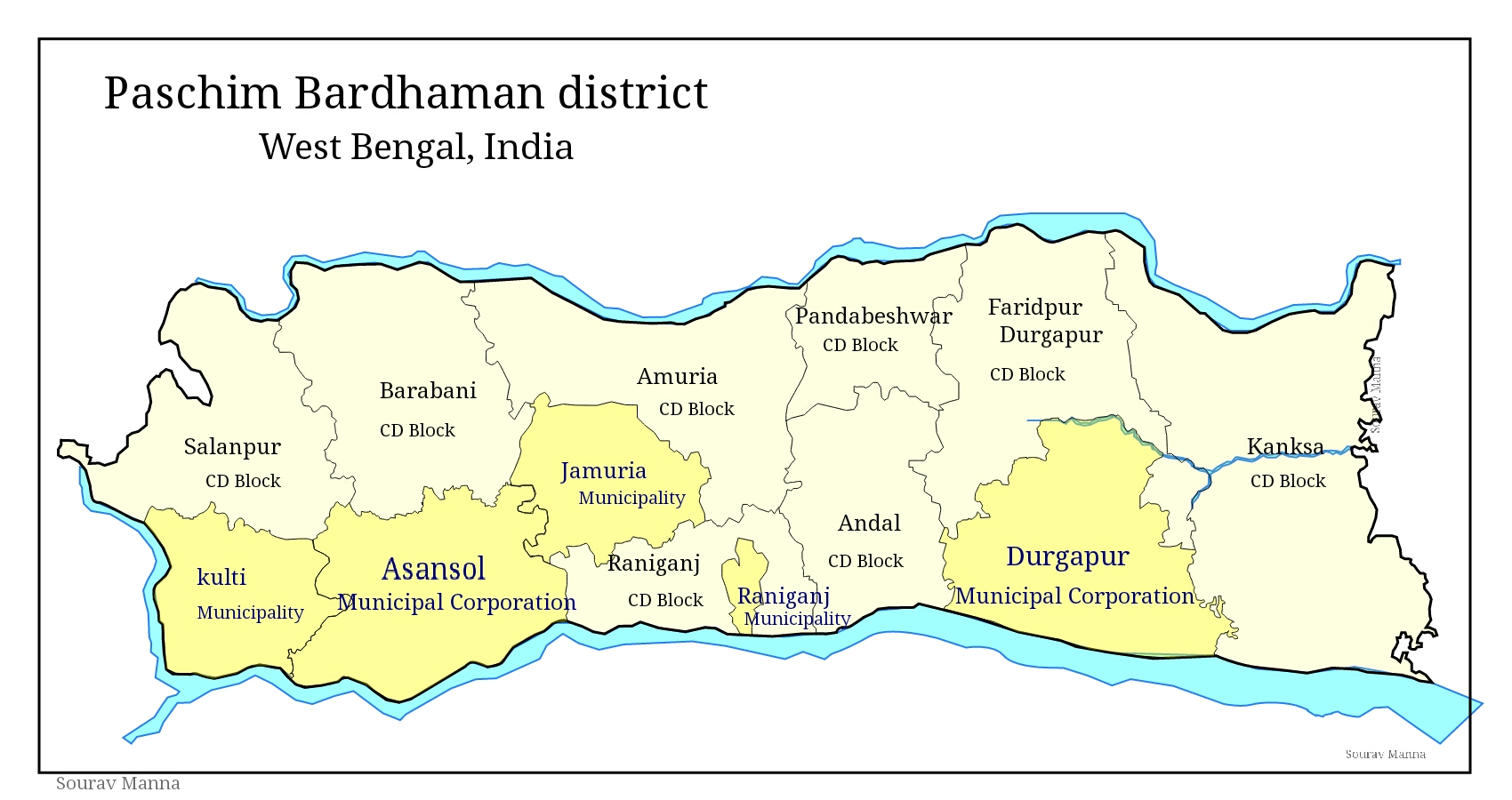
Map of Paschim Bardhaman district

== Subdivisions ==
Paschim Bardhaman district is divided into the following two administrative subdivisions:

Subdivision	Headquarters	Area km^{2}	Population (2011)	Rural population % (2011)	Urban population % (2011)
Asansol Sadar	Asansol	831.89	1,672,659	16.67	83.33
Durgapur	Durgapur	771.28	1,209,372	20.78	79.22
Paschim Bardhaman district	Asansol	1,603.17	2,882,031	18.39	81.61

Note: Before bifurcation of the erstwhile Bardhaman district Galsi I was in Durgapur subdivision, but after bifurcation it is in Bardhman Sadar North subdivision.

Cities, towns and ECL Areas in the western portion of Asansol Sadar subdivision in Paschim Bardhaman district
MC: Municipal Corporation, P: Rural police station, CT: census town, N: neighbourhood, OG: out growth
Owing to space constraints in the small map, the actual locations in a larger map may vary slightly
Cities and towns in the eastern portion of Asansol Sadar subdivision in Paschim Bardhaman district
MC: Municipal Corporation, CT: census town, N: neighbourhood, R: rural centre
Owing to space constraints in the small map, the actual locations in a larger map may vary slightly

== Administrative units ==
Asansol subdivision has 10 police stations, 4 community development blocks, 4 panchayat samitis, 35 gram panchayats, 181 mouzas, 165 inhabited villages, 1 municipal corporation, 3 municipalities and 26 census towns+1 (partly). The single municipal corporation is at Asansol. The municipalities are at: Raniganj, Jamuria and Kulti. The census towns are: Chittaranjan, Hindustan Cables Town, Panuria, Domohani, Bhanowara, Majiara, Pangachhiya, Kunustara, Topsi, Nimsa, Chinchuria, Kenda, Parasia, Ratibati, Chapui, Jemari (J.K. Nagar Township), Banshra, Belebathan, Chelad, Murgathaul, Amkula, Baktarnagar, Egara, Sahebganj, Raghunathchak, Ballavpur and Kendra Khottamdi (partly). It also includes Charanpur, an outgrowth of Jamuria. The subdivision has its headquarters at Asansol.

According to the Kolkata Gazette notification of 3 June 2015, the municipal areas of Kulti, Raniganj and Jamuria were included within the jurisdiction of Asansol Municipal Corporation.

== Demographics ==
Religion in Asansol subdivision
Hindu	80.84%
Muslim	16.93%
Christian	0.57%
Others	1.66%

As per the 2011 Census of India data Asansol Sadar subdivision, after bifurcation of Bardhaman district in 2017, had a total population of 1,672,659. There were 868,696 (51%) males and 803,963 (49%) females. Population below 6 years was 192,151.

As per the 2011 census data the total number of literates in Asansol subdivision, after bifurcation of Bardhaman district in 2017, was 1,147,851 (77.53% of the population over 6 years) out of which males numbered 649,034 (84.41% of the male population over 6 years) and females numbered 468,857 (65.85% of the female population over 6 years).

In the 2011 census Hindus numbered 1,352,185 and formed 80.84% of the population in Asansol subdivision. Muslims numbered 283,225 and formed 16.93% of the population. Christians numbered 9,478 and formed 0.57% of the population. Others numbered 2,771 and formed 1.66% of the population.

== Police stations ==
Police stations in Asansol Sadar subdivision have the following features and jurisdiction:

Police station	Area covered km^{2}	Municipal town	CD Block
Chittaranjan	18.03	-	Salanpur
Salanpur	52.09	-	Salanpur
Barabani	158.87	-	Barabani
Asansol North	49	Asansol	Raniganj
Raniganj	113.05	Raniganj	-
Jamuria	220	Jamuria	Jamuria
Asansol Women	Asansol and Durgapur subdivisions	-	-
Asansol South Women's	69	Asansol	-
Hirapur	63.33	Asansol	-
Kulti	96	Kulti	-

== Blocks ==
Community development blocks in Asansol Sadar subdivision are:

CD Block	Headquarters	Area km^{2}	Population (2011)	SC %	ST %	Hindus %	Muslims %	Literacy rate %	Census Towns
Salanpur	Rupnarayanpur	135.05	160,357	24.10	10.48	94.31	3.57	78.76	2
Barabani	Domohani Bazar	156.35	127,542	29.44	14.82	87.95	11.07	69.58	5
Jamuria	Bahadurpur	158.10	123,176	30.68	8.34	88.18	11.21	69.42	6+1 (part)
Raniganj	Raniganj	58.28	106,441	35.22	9.38	90.87	6.42	73.86	13

== Gram panchayats ==
The subdivision contains 35 gram panchayats under 4 community development blocks:

- Barabani block consists of eight gram panchayats, viz. Baraboni, Itapara, Nuni, Panuria, Domohani, Jamgram, Panchgechhia and Punchrah.
- Jamuria block consists of ten gram panchayats, viz. Bahadurpur, Dobrana, Madantor, Tapsi, Chinchuria, Hijalgara, Parasia, Churulia, Kenda and Shyamla.
- Raniganj block consists of six gram panchayats, viz. Amrasota, Egra, Ratibati, Ballavpur, Jemeri and Tirat.
- Salanpur block consists of eleven gram panchayats, viz. Achhra, Dendua, Fulberia Bolkunda, Alladi, Ethora, Rupnarayanpur, Basudevpur Jemari, Jitpur–Uttarrampur, Salanpur, Kalya and Samdi.

== Economy ==
=== Coal mining ===
Coal mining in India first started in the Raniganj Coalfield. In 1774, John Sumner and Suetonius Grant Heatly of the British East India Company found coal near Ethora, presently in Salanpur CD Block.

In 1973, the Government of India took over the management of all non-coking coal mines in the country and in 1975 Coal India was formed to manage the coking and non-coking coal mines.

In 2015–16, Eastern Coalfields, a subsidiary of Coal India, produced 40.209 million tonnes of raw coal. As of January 2017, it employed 64,433 persons.

=== Railways ===
Narayankuri ghat, on the Damodar, was used by Carr Tagore & Company for transporting coal to Kolkata by boat in the middle of the nineteenth century. Varying levels of water in the Damodar posed problems for transportation. In order to capture the lucrative coal transport business, East Indian Railway laid lines up to Raniganj in 1855. It captured the entire coal transport business. The line was extended to Asansol in 1863.

The Bardhaman-Asansol section, Asansol-Gaya section and Asansol-Patna section, of Eastern Railway, which are part of Howrah-Gaya-Delhi line, Howrah-Allahabad-Mumbai line and Howrah-Delhi main line, pass through this subdivision. The Andal-Jamuria-Sitarampur branch line also serves the coal mines. This subdivision connects to South Eastern Railway through the Asansol-Adra line.

=== Industry ===
IISCO Steel Plant of Steel Authority of India at Burnpur has a crude steel production capacity of 2.5 million tonnes per year. The modernisation and expansion programme of IISCO Steel Plant, implemented with an investment of over Rs 16,000 crore, was dedicated to the nation by Narendra Modi, Prime Minister, on 10 May 2015. As of 2015, the investment for modernization was the single largest investment in West Bengal till then. Established in 1918, the Indian Iron and Steel Company (IISCO) was amalgamated with SAIL in 2006 and renamed IISCO Steel Plant.

Chittaranjan Locomotive Works is one of the largest electric locomotive manufacturers in the world. Established in 1950, it produced steam locomotives up to 1972.

Ballavpur Paper Mnfg. Ltd. (earlier Bengal Paper Mill), after revamp of the plant at Ballavpur, started production in 2009. They produce kraft paper used for packaging.

== Education ==
Given in the table below (data in numbers) is a comprehensive picture of the education scenario in Paschim Bardhaman district, after bifurcation of Bardhaman district in 2017, with data for the year 2013-14:

Subdivision	Primary School		Middle School		High School		Higher Secondary School		General College, Univ		Technical / Professional Instt		Non-formal Education	
Subdivision	Institution	Student	Institution	Student	Institution	Student	Institution	Student	Institution	Student	Institution	Student	Institution	Student
Asansol Sadar	678	97,084	33	4,029	57	41,686	95	109,054	8	18,463	41	8,036	1,608	45,957
Durgapur	399	62339	23	1,904	43	28,057	64	83,075	6	11,229	36	18,090	1,337	45,014
Paschim Bardhaman district	1,077	159,423	56	5,933	110	69,743	159	192,129	14	29,692	77	26,126	2,945	90,971

Note: Primary schools include junior basic schools; middle schools, high schools and higher secondary schools include madrasahs; technical schools include junior technical schools, junior government polytechnics, industrial technical institutes, industrial training centres, nursing training institutes etc.; technical and professional colleges include engineering colleges, medical colleges, para-medical institutes, management colleges, teachers training and nursing training colleges, law colleges, art colleges, music colleges etc. Special and non-formal education centres include sishu siksha kendras, madhyamik siksha kendras, centres of Rabindra mukta vidyalaya, recognised Sanskrit tols, institutions for the blind and other handicapped persons, Anganwadi centres, reformatory schools etc.

The following institutions are located in Asansol subdivision:

- Kazi Nazrul University was established in 2012 at Asansol.
- Asansol Engineering College was established in 1998 at Asansol. It is affiliated with the Maulana Abul Kalam Azad University of Technology.
- Banwarilal Bhalotia College was established at Asanol in 1944. It is affiliated with the Kazi Nazrul University.
- Asansol Girls' College was established at Asansol in 1950. It is affiliated with the Kazi Nazrul University.
- Bidhan Chandra College was established in 1961 at Asansol. It is affiliated with the Kazi Nazrul University.
- Kulti College was established in 1986 at Kulti. It is affiliated with the Kazi Nazrul University.
- Kazi Nazrul Islam Mahavidyalaya was established in 1981 at Churulia. It is affiliated with Kazi Nazrul University.
- Triveni Devi Bhalotia College was established in 1957 at Raniganj. It is affiliated with Kazi Nazrul University.
- Raniganj Girls' College was established in 1980 at Raniganj. It is affiliated with Kazi Nazrul University.
- Kanyapur Polytechnic, offering diploma level courses in engineering, was established in 1965 at Asansol.
- Deshbandhu Mahavidyalaya was established at Chittaranjan in 1973. It is affiliated with the Kazi Nazrul University.

== Healthcare ==
The table below (all data in numbers) presents an overview of the medical facilities available and patients treated in the hospitals, health centres and sub-centres in 2014 in Paschim Bardhaman district, after bifurcation of Bardhaman district in 2017, with data for the year 2013–14.

Subdivision	Health & Family Welfare Deptt, WB				Other State Govt Deptts	Local bodies	Central Govt Deptts / PSUs	NGO / Private Nursing Homes	Total	Total Number of Beds	Total Number of Doctors	Indoor Patients	Outdoor Patients
Subdivision	Hospitals	Rural Hospitals	Block Primary Health Centres	Primary Health Centres	Other State Govt Deptts	Local bodies	Central Govt Deptts / PSUs	NGO / Private Nursing Homes	Total	Total Number of Beds	Total Number of Doctors	Indoor Patients	Outdoor Patients
Asansol	1	1	6	22	2	-	14	78	124	4,399	566	113,234	1,713,044
Durgapur	1	-	3	10	1	-	9	38	62	2,034	364	79,876	1,837,026
Paschim Bardhaman district	2	1	9	32	3	-	23	116	186	9,433	930	193,110	3,550,070

=== Medical facilities ===
Asansol subdivision has a subdivisional hospital at Asansol. There is a rural hospital at Ballavpur. The subdivision has block primary health centres at Pithaikuri, Kelejhora, Bahadurpur, Akalpur and Raniganj, and primary health centres at Dabar, Parbatpur, Domohani, Panuria, Nuni, Lalganj, Churulia, Chinchuria, Birkulti, Baktarnagar and Tirat. Other hospitals in Asansol subdivision include ECL Central Hospital at Kalla, Sanctoria Hospital at Dishergarh, ECL's Banshra Hospital at Banshra, ECL's Salanpur Hospital at Dendua, Divisional Railway Hospital at Asansol, ESI Hospital at Kanyapur, HLG Memorial Hospital at Kanyapur, Marwari Relief Society Hospital at Raniganj, Anandlok Hospital at Raniganj, Burnpur Hospital of SAIL at Burnpur. and Kasturba Gandhi Hospital of Chittaranjan Locomotive Works at Chittaranjan.

Further medical facilities in Asansol Sadar subdivision are as follows:

Hospitals: (Name, location, beds)

- Asansol Subdivisional Hospital, Asansol, 350 beds
- Asansol Special Jail Hospital, Asansol, 20 beds
- Dr. L. Sen Memorial Leprosy Hospital, Asansol, 50 beds
- Divisional Railway Hospital, Asansol, 225 beds
- ESI Hospital, Asansol, 150 beds
- Burnpur Hospital, Burnpur, 550 beds
- ECL Central Hospital, Kalla, 450 beds
- ECL Sanctoria Hospital, Dishergarh, 250 beds
- ECL Banshra Hospital, Banshra, PO Kalla, 50 beds
- ECL Satgram Hospital, Satgram, 50 beds
- KG Hospital, Chittaranjan, 150 beds
- Kulti Hospital, Kulti, 90 beds
- Raniganj Leprosy Hospital, Ballavpur, 50 beds
- Searsol TB Hospital, Searsol Rajbati, 50 beds

Rural Hospitals: (Name, CD block, location, beds)

- Ballabhpur Rural Hospital, Raniganj CD block, Ballavpur, 50 beds
- Bahadurpur Rural Hospital, Jamuria CD block, Bahadurpur, 30 beds
- Kelejora Rural Hospital, Barabani CD block, Domohani Bazar, 30 beds
- Pithaikeary Rural Hospital, Salanpur CD block, Rupnarayanpur, 30 beds

Block Primary Health Centres: (Name, CD block, location, beds)

- Raniganj Block Primary Health Centre, Raniganj CD block, Raniganj, 25 beds
- Akalpur Block Primary Health Centre, Jamuria CD block, Akalpur, 10 beds

Primary Health Centres : (CD block-wise)(CD block, PHC location, beds)

- Raniganj CD block: Baktarnagar (6), Tirat (PO Kalipahari) (6)
- Jamuria CD block: Churulia Pramila Nazrul (Churulia) (6), Sirisdanga (PO Mandi) (6), Birkulti (2), Chinchuria (6)
- Barabani CD block: Domohani (10), Lalganj (2), Nuni (6), Panuria (6)
- Salanpur CD block: Dabor (PO Achra) (10), Parbotpur (PO Samdi) (2)
- Asansol MC (earlier CD block areas): Barakar (15), Kumardiha (PO Sitarampur) (2), Sodepur (PO Sundar Chowk) (2), Marichkota (PO Ethora) (2), Dakshin Dhadka (10), Damra (PO Kalipahari) (2), Bidyanandapur (PO Surjanagara) (6), Dhenua (PO Hirapur) (2), Dihika (PO Surjanagar) (10).

== Electoral constituencies ==
Lok Sabha (parliamentary) and Vidhan Sabha (state assembly) constituencies in Asansol subdivision were as follows:

Lok Sabha constituency	Vidhan Sabha constituency	Reservation	CD Block and/or Gram panchayats and/or municipal areas
Asansol	Kulti	None	Wards 16–19,58-74,99-105 of Asansol Municipal Corporation(Before 2015 Kulti municipality)
	Barabni	None	Barabani and Salanpur CD Blocks
	Asansol Uttar	None	Wards 13–15,20-31,40-55,76 of Asansol Municipal Corporation(Before 2015 Ward nos. 1–8,10-17,19,21-33 of Asansol municipal corporation)
	Asansol Dakshin	None	Wards 38–39,56-57,75,77-87,94-98,106 of Asansol Municipal Corporation (Before 2015 Ward nos. 9,18,20,34-50 of Asansol municipal corporation) and Amrasota, Egara, Ballavpur, Jemari and Tirat gram panchayats of Raniganj CD Block
	Jamuria	None	Wards 1–12,32 of Asansol Municipal Corporation(Before 2015 Jamuria municipality), Jamuria CD Block, and Ratibati gram panchayat of Raniganj CD Block
	Raniganj	None	Wards 33–37,88-93 of Asansol Municipal Corporation(Before 2015 Raniganj municipality) and Andal CD Block of Durgapur subdivision.
	Pandaveswar	None	Pandabeswar and Faridpur Durgapur CD Blocks of Durgapur subdivision
