= Topsi =

- Census Town
- Location in West Bengal, India Topsi (India)
- Coordinates: 23.665711°N 87.130422°E
- Country: India
- State: West Bengal
- District: Paschim Bardhaman

Area
  - Total: 2.1691 km^{2} (0.8375 sq mi)

Population (2011)
  - Total: 4,329
  - Density: 1,996/km^{2} (5,169/sq mi)

Languages*
  - Official: Bengali, Hindi, English
- Time zone: UTC+5:30 (IST)
- PIN: 713362
- Telephone code: 0341
- Vehicle registration: WB
- Lok Sabha constituency: Asansol
- Vidhan Sabha constituency: Jamuria
- Website: bardhaman.gov.in

Topsi is a census town in the Jamuria CD block in the Asansol Sadar subdivision of Paschim Bardhaman district in the Indian state of West Bengal.

== Geography ==
Cities and towns in the eastern portion of Asansol Sadar subdivision in Paschim Bardhaman district
MC: Municipal Corporation, CT: census town, N: neighbourhood, R: rural centre
Owing to space constraints in the small map, the actual locations in a larger map may vary slightly

=== Location ===
Topsi is located at 23.665711°N 87.130422°E

=== Urbanisation ===
According to the 2011 census, 83.33% of the population of Asansol Sadar subdivision was urban and 16.67% was rural. In 2015, the municipal areas of Kulti, Raniganj and Jamuria were included within the jurisdiction of Asansol Municipal Corporation. Asansol Sadar subdivision has 26 (+1 partly) Census Towns.(partly presented in the map alongside; all places marked on the map are linked in the full-screen map).

== Demographics ==
According to the 2011 Census of India, Topsi had a total population of 4,329 of which 2,249 (52%) were males and 2,080 (48%) were females. Population in the age group 0–6 years was 556. The total number of literate persons in Topsi was 2,733 (72.44% of the population over 6 years).

*For language details see Jamuria (community development block)#Language and religion

According to the 2011 census, the urban agglomeration (UA) centred upon Asansol had a population of 1,243,414. In addition to the erstwhile municipalities of Kulti, Jamuria, and Raniganj subsequently incorporated into the Asansol Municipal Corporation, the agglomeration included the census towns of Amkula, Baktarnagar, Ballavpur, Bhanowara, Domohani, Egara, Jemari (J.K. Nagar Township), Majiara, Murgathaul, Raghunathchak, Sahebganj and Topsi, and also Charanpur, an outgrowth of Jamuria.

== Infrastructure ==
According to the District Census Handbook 2011, Bardhaman, Topsi covered an area of 2.1691 km^{2}. Among the civic amenities, it had 12.5 km roads with open drains, the protected water supply involved service reservoir, tap water from treated sources, uncovered wells. It had 300 domestic electric connections. Among the medical facilities the nearest dispensary/ health centre was 2 km away. Among the educational facilities it had were 5 primary schools, 1 middle school, other nearest educational facilities at Raniganj 10 km away. It had 2 non-formal education centres (Sarva Shiksha Abhiyan). Among the social, recreational and cultural facilities, it had 1 stadium, 3 auditorium/ community halls. Among the important commodities it manufactured were wine and cement. It had the branch office of 1 nationalised bank.

== Economy ==
As per ECL website telephone numbers, operational collieries in the Kunustoria Area in 2018 are: Amritnagar Colliery, Amrasota Colliery, Bansra Colliery, Belbaid Colliery, Kunustoria Colliery, Mahabir OCP, North Searsole Colliery, Parasea Colliery, Parasea 6 & 7 Incline and Parasea OCP.

== Transport ==
There is a station at Tapasi on the Andal-Jamuria-Sitarampur branch line.

== Education ==
Sriharikisen Public School is a Hindi-medium coeducational institution established in 1996. It has arrangements for teaching from class I to class VIII.

Topsi Junior High School is a Bengali-medium coeducational school established in 2009. It has arrangements for teaching from class V to class VIII.

== Healthcare ==
Medical facilities (hospitals and dispensaries) in the Kunustoria Area of ECL are available at Kunstoria Area Hospital (with 50 beds) (Banshra), Parasea Colliery (PO Parasea), Belbaid Colliery (PO Parasea), Kunustoria Colliery (PO Toposi), North Searsole Colliery (PO Bijpur), Bansra Colliery (PO Banshra), Amritnagar Colliery (PO Raniganj), Mahabir Colliery (PO Raniganj).
