= Raniganj (community development block) =

- Community development block
- Location in West Bengal
- Coordinates: 23°37′44″N 87°06′54″E
- Country: India
- State: West Bengal
- District: Paschim Bardhaman
- Parliamentary constituency: Asansol
- Assembly constituency: Asansol Dakshin, Jamuria

Area
  - Total: 22.50 sq mi (58.28 km^{2})
- Elevation: 302 ft (92 m)

Population (2011)
  - Total: 106,441
  - Density: 4,730/sq mi (1,826/km^{2})
- Time zone: UTC+5.30 (IST)
- PIN: 713347 (Raniganj); 713358 (Searsole Rajbari); 713323 (Ballavpur)
- Telephone/STD code: 0341
- Vehicle registration: WB-37,WB-38,WB-41,WB-42,WB-44
- Literacy Rate: 73.86 per cent
- Website: http://bdoraniganj.in/

Raniganj is a community development block that forms an administrative division in Asansol subdivision of Paschim Bardhaman district in the Indian state of West Bengal.

== Geography ==
Searsole Rajbari is located at 23°37′44″N 87°06′54″E.

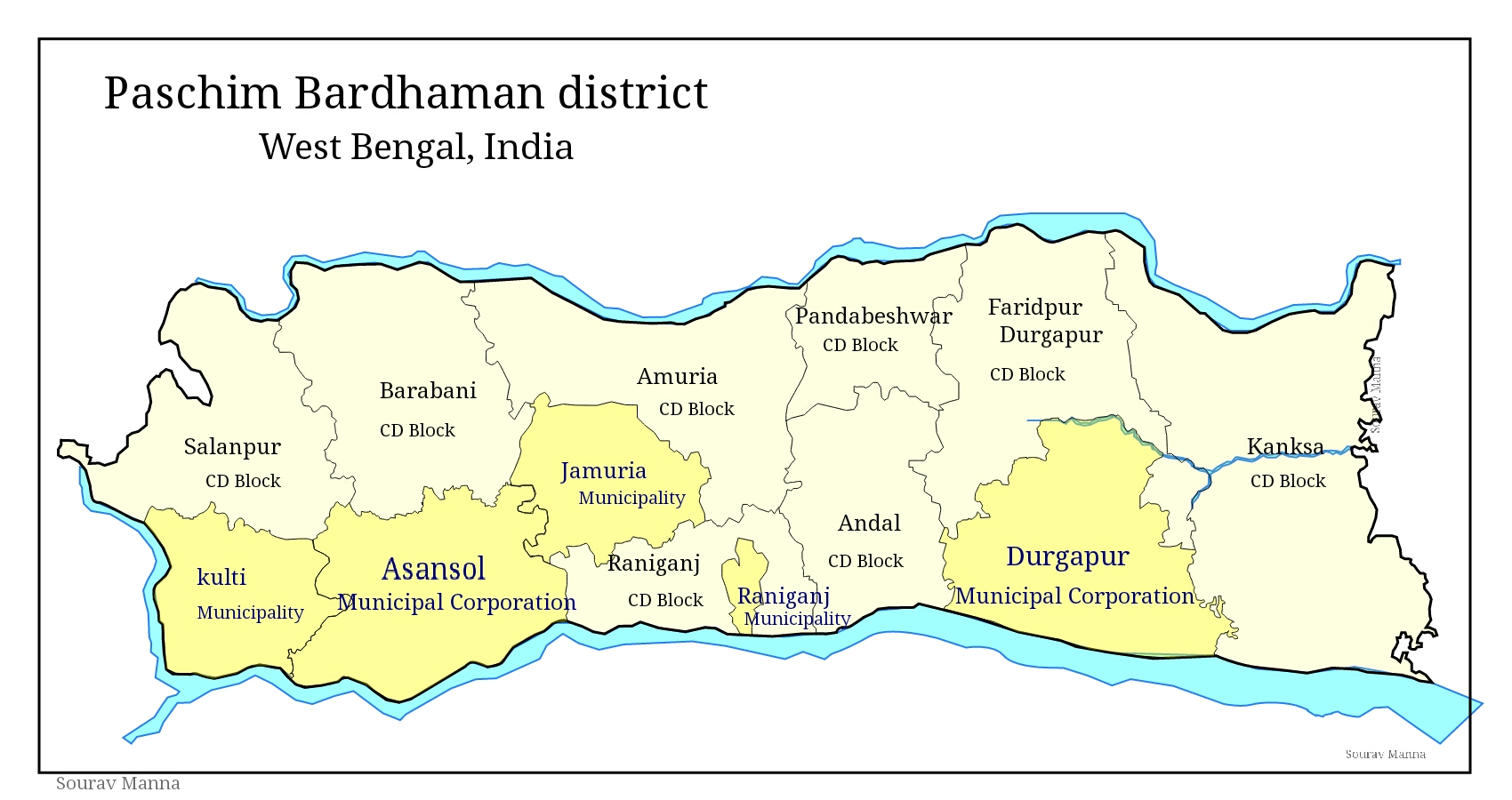
Map of Paschim Bardhaman district

Raniganj CD Block is part of the Ajay Damodar Barakar tract. This area is sort of an extension of the Chota Nagpur Plateau. It is a rocky undulating area with laterite soil, with the Ajay on the north, the Damodar on the south and the Barakar on the west. For ages the area was heavily forested and infested with plunderers and marauders. The discovery of coal, in the eighteenth century, led to industrialisation of the area and most of the forests have been cleared.

Raniganj CD Block is bounded by Asansol (municipal corporation)/ Raniganj and Jamuria CD Block on the north, Andal CD Block on the east, Mejia CD Block, in Bankura district, on the south and Asansol (municipal corporation)/ Barabani CD Block on the west.

Raniganj CD Block has an area of 58.28 km^{2}. It has 1 panchayat samity, 6 gram panchayats, 74 gram sansads (village councils), 12 mouzas and 12 inhabited villages. Asansol North and Raniganj police stations serve this block. Headquarters of this CD Block is at Raniganj.

Nunia, a small stream about 40 km long has its origin near Adra village in the Salanpur area, flows through the Barabani area, past Asansol and joins the Damodar in the Raniganj area.

Gram panchayats of Raniganj block/panchayat samiti are: Amrasota, Ballavpur, Egara, Jemari, Ratibati and Tirat.

== Demographics ==
=== Population ===
As per the 2011 Census of India Raniganj CD Block had a total population of 106,441, of which 23,023 were rural and 83,418 were urban. There were 55,835 (52%) males and 50,606 (48%) females. Population below 6 years was 12,885. Scheduled Castes numbered 37,491 (35.22%) and Scheduled Tribes numbered 9,982 (9.38%).

As per 2001 census, Raniganj block had a total population of 101,678, out of which 55,160 were males and 46,518 were females. Raniganj block registered a population growth of -20.45 per cent during the 1991-2001 decade. Decadal growth for Bardhaman district was 14.36 per cent. Decadal growth in West Bengal was 17.84 per cent. Scheduled castes at 33,515 formed around one-third the population. Scheduled tribes numbered 9,761.

Census Towns in Raniganj CD Block are (2011 census figures in brackets): Ratibati (4,508), Chapui (5,358), Jemari (J.K. Nagar Township) (13,179), Banshra (5,703), Belebathan (4,459), Chelad (7,471), Murgathaul (7,371), Amkula (5,445), Baktarnagar (5,112), Egara (7,623), Sahebganj (4,715), Raghunathchak (6,006) and Ballavpur (6,468).

Large villages (with 4,000+ population) in Raniganj CD Block are (2011 census figures in brackets): Tirat (4,224).

Other villages in Raniganj CD Block are (2011census figures in brackets): Saora (2,191), Kumardiha (2,142), Chalbalpur (3,567), Harabhanga (1,907), Damalia (1,118), Narayankuri (2,176), Nimcha (2,065), Chak Janadhara (343), Sonachora (11), Chak Brindabanpur (818) and Napur (2,461).(All villages included in 2011 census data are mentioned here. Other villages or localities, if any, are parts of these villages.)

=== Literacy ===
As per the 2011 census the total number of literates in Raniganj CD Block was 69,098 (73.86% of the population over 6 years) out of which males numbered 40,733 (82.90% of the male population over 6 years) and females numbered 28,365 (63.86% of the female population over 6 years). The gender disparity (the difference between female and male literacy rates) was 19.04%.

As per 2001 census, Raniganj block had a total literacy of 65.85 per cent for the 6+ age group. While male literacy was 76.59 per cent female literacy was 52.97 per cent. Bardhaman district had a total literacy of 70.18 per cent, male literacy being 78.63 per cent and female literacy being 60.95 per cent.

See also – List of West Bengal districts ranked by literacy rate

Literacy in CD blocks of
Bardhaman district
Bardhaman Sadar North subdivision
Ausgram I – 69.39%
Ausgram II – 68.00%
Bhatar – 71.56%
Burdwan I – 76.07%
Burdwan II – 74.12%
Galsi II – 70.05%
Bardhaman Sadar South subdivision
Khandaghosh – 77.28%
Raina I – 80.20%
Raina II – 81.48%
Jamalpur – 74.08%
Memari I – 74.10%
Memari II – 74.59%
Kalna subdivision
Kalna I – 75.81%
Kalna II – 76.25%
Manteswar – 73.08%
Purbasthali I – 77.59%
Purbasthali II – 70.35%
Katwa subdivision
Katwa I – 70.36%
Katwa II – 69.16%
Ketugram I – 68.00%
Ketugram II – 65.96%
Mongalkote – 67.97%
Durgapur subdivision
Andal – 77.25%
Faridpur Durgapur – 74.14%
Galsi I – 72.81%
Kanksa – 76.34%
Pandabeswar – 73.01%
Asansol subdivision
Barabani – 69.58%
Jamuria – 69.42%
Raniganj – 73.86%
Salanpur – 78.76%
2011 Census: CD Block Wise

Primary Census Abstract Data

=== Language and religion ===
Religion in Raniganj CD block (2011)
| Hinduism | 90.87% |
| Islam | 6.42% |
| Other (tribal religion) | 1.96% |
| Christianity | 0.41% |
| Other or not stated | 0.34% |

In the 2011 census Hindus numbered 96,719 and formed 90.87% of the population in Raniganj CD Block. Muslims numbered 6,837 and formed 6.42% of the population. Christians numbered 441 and formed 0.41% of the population. Others numbered 2,444 and formed 2.30% of the population.

Languages of Raniganj CD block (2011)
1. Bengali (56.4%)
2. Hindi (32.2%)
3. Santali (6.89%)
4. Urdu (2.05%)
5. Others (2.51%)

At the time of the 2011 census, 56.39% of the population spoke Bengali, 32.16% Hindi, 6.89% Santali and 2.05% Urdu as their first language.

== Rural poverty ==
As per poverty estimates obtained from household survey for families living below poverty line in 2005, rural poverty in Raniganj CD Block was 13.66%.

== Economy ==
=== Livelihood ===
Livelihood
in Raniganj CD Block
1. Cultivators (1.69%)
2. Agricultural labourers (4.15%)
3. Household industries (1.96%)
4. Other Workers (92.2%)

In Raniganj CD Block in 2011, amongst the class of total workers, cultivators numbered 584 and formed 1.69% of the total workers, agricultural labourers numbered 1,386 and formed 4.15%, household industry workers numbered 655 and formed 1.96% and other workers numbered 30,756 and formed 92.19%. Total workers numbered 33,361 and formed 31.34% of the total population, and non-workers numbered 73,080 and formed 68.66% of the population.

Coalmines are spread across the Andal, Pandaveswar, Raniganj, Jamuria, Barabani and Salanpur region, including municipal areas. Livelihood in this region is coal-centred. The area does not produce much of agricultural products. Overall work participation rate, and female work participation rate, in the mining area are low. Interestingly the work participation rate in the predominantly agricultural rural areas of erstwhile Bardhaman district is higher than in the predominantly urbanised mining area. Human development in the mining area does not at all look good. However, in the composite livelihood index the mining area performs much better than the non-mining areas of erstwhile Bardhaman district. The decadal (1991–2001) change in composition of workers shows the growing pressure of population growth, as well as of migrants from adjacent Jharkhand.

Note: In the census records a person is considered a cultivator, if the person is engaged in cultivation/ supervision of land owned by self/government/institution. When a person who works on another person's land for wages in cash or kind or share, is regarded as an agricultural labourer. Household industry is defined as an industry conducted by one or more members of the family within the household or village, and one that does not qualify for registration as a factory under the Factories Act. Other workers are persons engaged in some economic activity other than cultivators, agricultural labourers and household workers. It includes factory, mining, plantation, transport and office workers, those engaged in business and commerce, teachers, entertainment artistes and so on.

=== Infrastructure ===
All 12 or 100% of mouzas in Raniganj CD Block were electrified by 31 March 2014.

All 12 mouzas in Raniganj CD Block had drinking water facilities in 2013-14. There were 5 fertiliser depots, 3 seed stores and 38 fair price shops in the CD Block.

=== Coal mining ===
Nimcha open cast project in Satgram Area of Eastern Coalfields has a mineable reserve of 8.70 million tonnes.

Damalia open cast project in Satgram Area of Eastern Coalfields has a mineable reserve of 0.44 million tonnes.

The coal-bed methane gas block of Essar Group, the largest CBM player in India, in Raniganj is close to commercial production.

See also – Satgram Area and Kunustoria Area of Eastern Coalfields

=== Industries ===
Asansol-Durgapur Development Authority (ADDA) has developed the Managalpur Industrial Estate.

=== Agriculture ===
Although the Bargadari Act of 1950 recognised the rights of bargadars to a higher share of crops from the land that they tilled, it was not implemented fully. Large tracts, beyond the prescribed limit of land ceiling, remained with the rich landlords. From 1977 onwards major land reforms took place in West Bengal. Land in excess of land ceiling was acquired and distributed amongst the peasants. Following land reforms land ownership pattern has undergone transformation. In 2013-14, persons engaged in agriculture in Raniganj CD Block could be classified as follows: bargadars 15.92%, patta (document) holders 35.80%, small farmers (possessing land between 1 and 2 hectares) 2.06%, marginal farmers (possessing land up to 1 hectare) 26.67% and agricultural labourers 19.55%.

In 2003-04 net cropped area in Raniganj CD Block was 2,434 hectares and the area in which more than one crop was grown was 770 hectares.

In 2013-14, Raniganj CD Block produced 4,016 tonnes of Aman paddy, the main winter crop, from 1,475 hectares. It also produced pulses and oilseeds.

=== Banking ===
In 2013-14, Raniganj CD Block had offices of 12 commercial banks and 2 gramin banks.

== Transport ==
Narayankuri ghat, on the Damodar, was used by M/s Carr Tagore & Company for transporting coal to Kolkata by boat in the middle of the nineteenth century. Varying levels of water in the Damodar posed problems for transportation. In order to capture the lucrative coal transport business, East Indian Railway laid lines up to Raniganj in 1855. It captured the entire coal transport business. The line was extended to Asansol in 1863.

The Bardhaman-Asansol section, which is a part of Howrah-Gaya-Delhi line, Howrah-Allahabad-Mumbai line and Howrah-Delhi main line, passes through this CD Block and there is a station at Raniganj.

Raniganj CD Block has 12 originating/ terminating bus routes.

NH 19 (old number NH 2) and NH 14 (old number NH 60) cross at Raniganj.

== Education ==
In 2013-14, Raniganj CD Block had 46 primary schools with 5,807 students, 7 middle schools with 732 students, 1 high school with 688 students and 5 higher secondary schools with 6,042 students. Raniganj CD Block had 181 institutions for special and non-formal education with 5,723 students. Raniganj (then a municipal town, outside the CD Block) had 2 general colleges with 6,235 students.

== Healthcare ==
In 2014, Raniganj CD block had 1 rural hospital, 1 block primary health centre, 2 primary health centres, 1 central government/ PSU medical centre and 4 private nursing homes with total 107 beds and 8 doctors (excluding private bodies). It had 20 family welfare sub centres. 5,522 patients were treated indoor and 191,301 patients were treated outdoor in the hospitals, health centres and subcentres of the CD Block.

Ballavpur Rural Hospital, with 50 beds at Ballavpur, is the major government medical facility in the Raniganj CD block. Raniganj Block Primary Health centre at Raniganj functions with 25 beds. There are primary health centres at Baktarnagar (with 6 beds) and Tirat (with 6 beds). ECL Banshra Hospital at Banshra functions with 50 beds.

== Politics ==
Raniganj (West Bengal Vidhan Sabha constituency) is the assembly constituency.
