= Barabani (community development block) =

- Community development block
- Coordinates: 23°45′25″N 87°01′30″E
- Country: India
- State: West Bengal
- District: Paschim Bardhaman district
- Parliamentary constituency: Asansol
- Assembly constituency: Barabani

Area
  - Total: 60.37 sq mi (156.35 km^{2})
- Elevation: 371 ft (113 m)

Population (2011)
  - Total: 127,542
  - Density: 2,112.8/sq mi (815.75/km^{2})
- Time zone: UTC+5.30 (IST)
- PIN: 713334 (Domahani Bazar); 713341 (Kanyapur); 713315 (Panuria)
- Telephone/STD code: 0341
- Vehicle registration: WB-37,WB-38,WB-41,WB-42,WB-44
- Literacy Rate: 69.58 per cent
- Website: http://bardhaman.gov.in/

Barabani is a community development block (CD block) that forms an administrative division in Asansol subdivision of Paschim Bardhaman district in the Indian state of West Bengal.

== Geography ==
Barabani CD Block is part of the Ajay Damodar Barakar tract. This area is sort of an extension of the Chota Nagpur Plateau. It is a rocky area with laterite soil, with the Ajay on the north, the Damodar on the south and the Barakar on the west. Once heavily wooded, the discovery of coal in the eighteenth century led to industrialisation and the clear-cutting of most of the forests.

Barabani CD Block is bounded by Nala CD Block, in Jamtara district of Jharkhand, on the north, Jamuria and Raniganj CD Blocks on the east, Asansol (municipal corporation) and after that Santuri CD Block, in Purulia district, and Saltora CD Block, in Bankura district, on the south and Salanpur CD Block on the west.

Barabani CD Block has an area of 156.35 km^{2}. It has 1 panchayat samity, 8 gram panchayats, 92 gram sansads (village councils), 49 mouzas and 46 inhabited villages. Barabani police station serves this block. Headquarters of this CD Block is at Domohani Bazar.

Nunia, a small stream about 40 km long has its origin near Adra village in the Salanpur area, flows through the Barabani area, past Asansol and joins the Damodar in the Raniganj area.

Gram panchayats of Barabani block/panchayat samiti are: Barabani, Domohani, Itapara, Jamgram, Nuni, Pangachhia, Panuria and Punchra.

== Demographics ==
=== Population ===
As per the 2011 Census of India Barabani CD Block had a total population of 127,542, of which 79,255 were rural and 48,287 were urban. There were 65,912 (52%) males and 61,630 (48%) females. Population below 6 years was 16,720. Scheduled Castes numbered 37,542 (29.44%) and Scheduled Tribes numbered 18,903 (14.82%).

As per 2001 census, Barabani block had a total population of 110,361, out of which 57,735 were males and 52,626 were females. Barabani block registered a population growth of 9.97 per cent during the 1991-2001 decade. Decadal growth for Bardhaman district was 14.36 per cent. Decadal growth in West Bengal was 17.84 per cent. Scheduled castes at 34,630 formed around one-third the population. Scheduled tribes numbered 16,905.

Census Towns in Barabani CD Block are (2011 census figures in brackets): Panuria (8,399), Domohani (12,480), Bhanowara (8,855), Majiara (5,444), Pangachhiya (9,165) and Charanpur (Outgrowth) (3,944).

Large villages (with 4,000+ population) in Barabani CD Block are (2011 census figures in brackets): Kelejora (5,533) and Jamgram (7,614).

Other villages in Barabani CD Block include (2011 census figures in brackets): Barabani (2,330), Nuni (2,557), Puchra (3,814) and Itapora (1,724).

=== Literacy ===
Literacy in CD blocks of
Bardhaman district
Bardhaman Sadar North subdivision
Ausgram I – 69.39%
Ausgram II – 68.00%
Bhatar – 71.56%
Burdwan I – 76.07%
Burdwan II – 74.12%
Galsi II – 70.05%
Bardhaman Sadar South subdivision
Khandaghosh – 77.28%
Raina I – 80.20%
Raina II – 81.48%
Jamalpur – 74.08%
Memari I – 74.10%
Memari II – 74.59%
Kalna subdivision
Kalna I – 75.81%
Kalna II – 76.25%
Manteswar – 73.08%
Purbasthali I – 77.59%
Purbasthali II – 70.35%
Katwa subdivision
Katwa I – 70.36%
Katwa II – 69.16%
Ketugram I – 68.00%
Ketugram II – 65.96%
Mongalkote – 67.97%
Durgapur subdivision
Andal – 77.25%
Faridpur Durgapur – 74.14%
Galsi I – 72.81%
Kanksa – 76.34%
Pandabeswar – 73.01%
Asansol subdivision
Barabani – 69.58%
Jamuria – 69.42%
Raniganj – 73.86%
Salanpur – 78.76%
2011 Census: CD Block Wise

Primary Census Abstract Data

As per the 2011 census the total number of literates in Barabani CD Block was 77,115 (69.58% of the population over 6 years) out of which males numbered 45,474 (79.36% of the male population over 6 years) and females numbered 31,641 (59.12% of the female population over 6 years). The gender disparity (the difference between female and male literacy rates) was 20.24%.

As per 2001 census, Barabani block had a total literacy of 63.57 per cent for the 6+ age group. While male literacy was 75.99 per cent female literacy was 49.88 per cent. Bardhaman district had a total literacy of 70.18 per cent, male literacy being 78.63 per cent and female literacy being 60.95 per cent.

=== Language and religion ===
Religion in Barabani CD block (2011)
Hinduism	87.95%
Islam	11.07%
Other or not stated	0.97%

In the 2011 census Hindus numbered 108,710 and formed 87.95% of the population in Barabani CD Block. Muslims numbered 13,686 and formed 11.07% of the population. Christians numbered 67 and formed 0.05% of the population. Others numbered 1,135 and formed 0.92% of the population.

Languages of Barabani CD block (2011)
1. Bengali (72.6%)
2. Hindi (12.4%)
3. Santali (11.8%)
4. Urdu (1.97%)
5. Others (1.25%)

At the time of the 2011 census, 72.56% of the population spoke Bengali, 12.39% Hindi, 11.83% Santali and 1.97% Urdu as their first language.

== Rural poverty ==
As per poverty estimates obtained from household survey for families living below poverty line in 2005, rural poverty in Barabani CD Block was 29.48%.

== Economy ==
=== Livelihood ===
Livelihood
in Barabani CD Block
1. Cultivators (9.44%)
2. Agricultural labourers (21.0%)
3. Household industries (2.48%)
4. Other Workers (67.1%)

In Barabani CD Block in 2011, amongst the class of total workers, cultivators numbered 3,919 and formed 9.44% of the total workers, agricultural labourers numbered 8,716 and formed 21.00%, household industry workers numbered 1,020 and formed 2.48% and other workers numbered 27,842 and formed 67.08%. Total workers numbered 41,506 and formed 33.58% of the total population, and non-workers numbered 82,092 and formed 66.42% of the population.

Coalmines are spread across the Andal, Pandaveswar, Raniganj, Jamuria, Barabani and Salanpur region, including municipal areas. Livelihood in this region is coal-centred. The area does not produce much of agricultural products. Overall work participation rate, and female work participation rate, in the mining area are low. Interestingly the work participation rate in the predominantly agricultural rural areas of erstwhile Bardhaman district is higher than in the predominantly urbanised mining area. Human development in the mining area does not at all look good. However, in the composite livelihood index the mining area performs much better than the non-mining areas of erstwhile Bardhaman district. The decadal (1991-2001) change in composition of workers shows the growing pressure of population growth, as well as of migrants from adjacent Jharkhand.

Note: In the census records a person is considered a cultivator, if the person is engaged in cultivation/ supervision of land owned by self/government/institution. When a person who works on another person's land for wages in cash or kind or share, is regarded as an agricultural labourer. Household industry is defined as an industry conducted by one or more members of the family within the household or village, and one that does not qualify for registration as a factory under the Factories Act. Other workers are persons engaged in some economic activity other than cultivators, agricultural labourers and household workers. It includes factory, mining, plantation, transport and office workers, those engaged in business and commerce, teachers, entertainment artistes and so on.

=== Infrastructure ===
All 49 or 100% of mouzas in Barabani CD Block were electrified by 31 March 2014.

All 49 mouzas in Barabani CD Block had drinking water facilities in 2013-14. There were 15 fertiliser depots and 35 fair price shops in the CD Block.

=== Coal mining ===
Bhanora West open cast project in Sripur Area of Eastern Coalfields has a mineable reserve of 23.07 million tonnes.

See also – Salanpur Area and Sripur Area of Eastern Coalfields

=== Agriculture ===
Although the Bargadari Act of 1950 recognised the rights of bargadars to a higher share of crops from the land that they tilled, it was not implemented fully. Large tracts, beyond the prescribed limit of land ceiling, remained with the rich landlords. From 1977 onwards major land reforms took place in West Bengal. Land in excess of land ceiling was acquired and distributed amongst the peasants. Following land reforms land ownership pattern has undergone transformation. In 2013-14, persons engaged in agriculture in Barabani CD Block could be classified as follows: bargadars 4.18%, patta (document) holders 22.80%, small farmers (possessing land between 1 and 2 hectares) 6.32%, marginal farmers (possessing land up to 1 hectare) 23.51% and agricultural labourers 43.20%.

In 2003-04 net cropped area in Barabani CD Block was 9,544 hectares and the area in which more than one crop was grown was 838 hectares.

In 2013-14, Barabani CD Block produced 8,874 tonnes of Aman paddy, the main winter crop, from 3,446 hectares and 768 tonnes of potatoes from 24 hectares. It also produced pulses and oilseeds.

In 2013-14, 5 hectares were irrigated with river lift irrigation.

=== Banking ===
In 2013-14, Barabani CD Block had offices of 5 commercial banks and 2 gramin banks.

== Transport ==
Barabani CD Block has 1 ferry service and 6 originating/ terminating bus routes.

The Andal-Jamuria-Sitarampur branch line passes through this CD Block and there is a station at Barabani.

There is a road from Asansol to Nala, in Jamtara district of Jharkhand, which goes through this CD Block and crosses the Ajay River at Runakura Ghat.

== Education ==
In 2013-14, Barabani CD Block had 88 primary schools with 7,584 students, 10 middle schools with 962 students, 6 high schools with 3,946 students and 4 higher secondary schools with 4,756 students. Barabani CD Block had 1 technical/ professional institution with 100 students and 224 institutions for special and non-formal education with 6,876 students.

== Healthcare ==
In 2014, Barabani CD Block had 1 block primary health centre and 5 primary health centres with total 35 beds and 7 doctors (excluding private bodies). It had 16 family welfare sub centres. 2,428 patients were treated indoor and 170,334 patients were treated outdoor in the hospitals, health centres and subcentres of the CD Block.

Kelejora Rural Hospital, with 30 beds, at Kelejora, PO Domohani Bazar, is the major government medical facility in the Barabani CD block. There are primary health centres at Domohani (with 10 beds), Lalganj (with 2 beds), Nuni (with 6 beds) and Panuria (with 6 beds).
