= Jamuria =

- Neighbourhood in Asansol
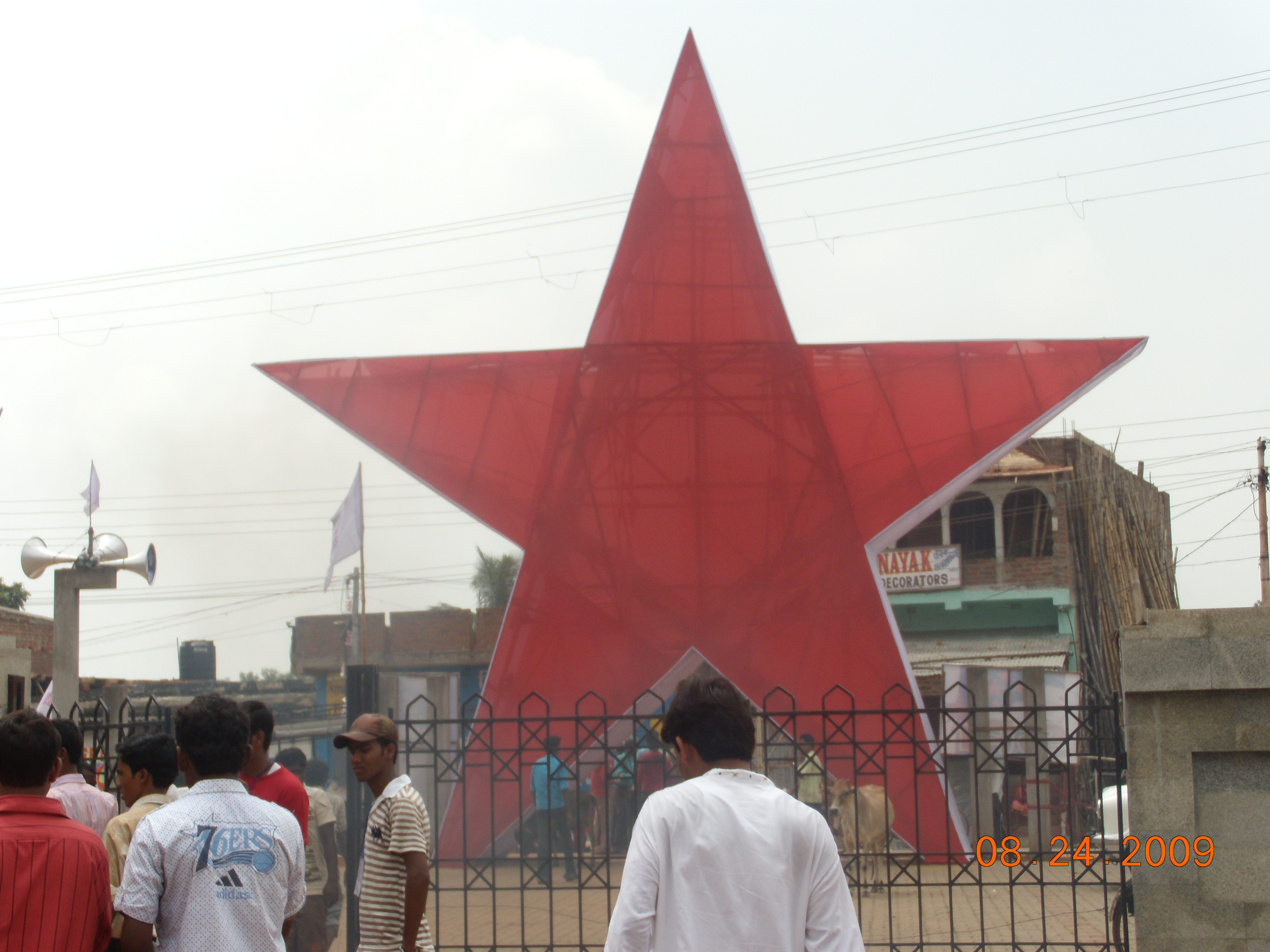

- Location in Asansol, West Bengal, India Jamuria (India)
- Coordinates: 23.7°N 87.08°E
- Country: India
- State: West Bengal
- District: Paschim Bardhaman
- City: Asansol
- Municipal Corporation: Asansol Municipal Corporation
- AMC wards: Ward Nos. 1 to 12 & 32

Government
  - Type: Municipal Corporation
  - Body: Asansol Municipal Corporation
- Elevation: 111 m (364 ft)

Languages*
  - Official: Bengali, Hindi, English
- Time zone: UTC+5:30 (IST)
- Postal code: 713336
- Lok Sabha constituency: Asansol
- Vidhan Sabha constituency: Jamuria
- Website: paschimbardhaman.co.in

Jamuria is a neighbourhood in Asansol of Paschim Bardhaman district in the Indian state of West Bengal. It is governed by Asansol Municipal Corporation

== Geography ==
Cities and towns in the eastern portion of Asansol Sadar subdivision in Paschim Bardhaman district
MC: Municipal Corporation, CT: census town, N: neighbourhood, R: Rural centre
Owing to space constraints in the small map, the actual locations in a larger map may vary slightly

=== Location ===
Jamuria is located at 23.7°N 87.08°E. It has an average elevation of 111 metres (364 feet).

In recent times various small and medium industries have been set up in and around the town which mainly includes small iron and cement industries.

Singaran, a small stream about 35 km long has its origin near Ikra in the Jamuria area, flows past Topsi and Andal and joins the Damodar near Waria.

Gram panchayats under Jamuria Panchayat Samiti are: Churulia, Madantore, Hijolgora, Chinchuria, Shyamla, Bahadurpur, Dobrana, Kenda, Parasia and Topsi.

=== Urbanisation ===
As per the 2011 census, 83.33% of the population of Asansol Sadar subdivision was urban and 16.67% was rural. Asansol Sadar subdivision has 26 (+1 partly) Census Towns.(partly presented in the map alongside; all places marked on the map are linked in the full-screen map).

=== Asansol Municipal Corporation ===
According to the Kolkata Gazette notification of 3 June 2015, the municipal areas of Kulti, Raniganj and Jamuria were included within the jurisdiction of Asansol Municipal Corporation.

=== Police station ===
Jamuria police station has jurisdiction over Jamuria CD Block and parts of Asansol Municipal Corporation. The area covered is 96 km^{2} and the population covered is 310,000.

== Demographics ==
As per the 2011 Census of India Jamuria municipal area plus outgrowth had a total population of 149,220, of which 77,379 (52%) were males and 71,841 (48%) were females. Population below 6 years was 19,526. The total number of literates in Jamuria was 92,930 (86.91% of the population over 6 years).

*For language details see Jamuria (community development block)#Language and religion

As of 2001 India census, Jamuria had a population of 129,456. Males constitute 53% of the population and females 47%. Jamuria has an average literacy rate of 58%, lower than the national average of 59.5%: male literacy is 67%, and female literacy is 47%. In Jamuria, 14% of the population is under 6 years of age.

=== Languages ===
Languages spoken in Jamuria city (2011)
1. Bengali (47.5%)
2. Hindi (29.1%)
3. Urdu (10.9%)
4. Santali (7.53%)
5. Bhojpuri (1.28%)
6. Others (3.64%)

== Economy ==
It is in the heart of the coal mining zone. With plenty of coal seams near the surface, illegal mining has been a long-standing problem in the area. In recent times, various small industries have mushroomed which have provided employment to local unskilled people. There are four notable banks operating in the area with Axis Bank, State Bank of India, Bank of India and HDFC Bank catering to most of the local people.

== Transport ==
There is a rail track: Andal-Sonachara-Tapasi-Ikra-Jamuria-Barabani-Chinchuria-Sitarampur,

The only other public transport are the buses that runs in Jamuria-Raniganj route, Jamuria-Asansol route and the Jamuria-Haripur route.

There is also a regular bus service to Kolkata, capital city of West Bengal every morning and return bus from Kolkata in the evening.

== Education ==
Jamuria has forty-nine primary, one upper primary, nine secondary and three higher secondary schools.
