= Kulti =

- Neighbourhood in Asansol
- Location in Asansol, West Bengal, India Kulti (India)
- Coordinates: 23.73°N 86.85°E
- Country: India
- State: West Bengal
- District: West Burdwan
- City: Asansol
- Municipal Corporation: Asansol Municipal Corporation
- AMC wards: Ward Nos. 62,63,64,65
- Elevation: 114 m (374 ft)

Languages*
  - Official: Bengali, Hindi, English
- Time zone: UTC+5:30 (IST)
- PIN: 713343
- Lok Sabha constituency: Asansol
- Vidhan Sabha constituency: Kulti
- Website: westburdwan.co.in

Kulti, a neighbourhood in Asansol, is located in Paschim Bardhaman district in the Indian state of West Bengal. It is governed by Asansol Municipal Corporation.

== History ==
Kulti introduced modern metallurgy in India. In 1870, James Erskin, an Englishman, established the Bengal Iron Works (also known as Barakar Iron Works. It had two open top furnaces of approved Scottish design and initially purchased locally produced coke. The locally available iron ore contained 47 percent metallic iron. The limestone came from deposits nearby. Auxiliary equipment included blowing engines, apparatus for heating the blast, hoist and water pumps. The blast furnaces produced 40 tons of grey pig iron every 24 hours. Offices, scale houses, stores and dwelling houses were separately built. It employed 1,900 people by the close of the century. The plant was located in the villages of Kendwa and Kulti,

Subsequently, production was enhanced to 200 tons per day, with the addition of the cup and cone top gear for the blast furnaces, installation of 25 coke ovens and other equipment.

Three years after the plant starting producing pig iron towards the middle of 1875, it was found that there was no market for the pig iron, as the foundry industry had not developed sufficiently. It was taken over by the Government of Bengal in 1880-81; it was operated till 1889 as Bengal Iron Works. In 1890, a sterling company was formed in London; it was named Bengal Iron & Steel Co. Ltd. In 1892, Martin & Co. were appointed managing agents.

Around 1904, Bengal Iron & Steel Co. converted the open top furnaces into closed top furnaces, and installed facilities for producing steel. The steel making facilities went into production but closed down after two years as the operations were unremunerative. In 1918, G.H.Fairhurst took over as general manager of Bengal Iron & Steel Co. By then the company was doing well and even exporting pig iron to Japan, the Far East, Mesopotamia and Russia, but the directors of the company, living in London, were not interested in expanding its business any further. G.H.Fairhurst joined Burn & Co. and was instrumental in the move to start a new iron-making plant.

In 1926, Bengal Iron & Steel Co. Ltd. was renamed The Bengal Iron Co. Ltd. In 1918, Burn & Co. promoted The Indian Iron and Steel Co. Ltd., which launched the iron-making facilities at Burnpur, under the leadership of Sir Rajendra Nath Mookerjee and T. Lalie Martin, son of Sir Acquin Martin, who had earlier partnered Sir Rajen in forming Martin & Co. In 1936, The Indian Iron and Steel Co. Ltd. absorbed The Bengal Iron Co. Ltd.

The Kulti Works of The Indian Iron and Steel Co. Ltd, was brought under the control of Growth Division of Steel Authority of India Ltd. and renamed SAIL Growth Works in 2007.

Kulti Works covers a total area of around 850 acres, which includes a sprawling colony of 2,300 residential units, a 9-hole golf course and a club. The plant is located on 228 acres.

SAIL downed shutters at Kulti on 1 April 2003, after all the employees of the plant availed themselves of the voluntary retirement scheme.

== Administration ==
Kulti police station has jurisdiction over parts of Asansol Municipal Corporation. The area covered is 96 km^{2} and the population covered is 310,000.

== Demographics ==
As per the 2011 Census of India Kulti municipal area had a total population of 313,809, of which 163,193 (52%) were males and 150,616 (48%) were females. Population below 6 years was 35,385. The total number of literates in Kulti was 209,952 (88.72% of the population over 6 years).

As of 2001 India census, Kulti had a population of 290,057. Males constitute 53% of the population and females 47%. Kulti has an average literacy rate of 62%, higher than the national average of 59.5%: male literacy is 70%, and female literacy is 52%. In Kulti, 12% of the population is under 6 years of age. According to the census, 19% of the population in Kulti is Muslim, 70% Hindu. Other minorities such as Christian, Sikhs, Buddhist and Jain constitute the rest of the city's population

=== Languages ===
Languages spoken in Kulti city (2011)
1. Bengali (41.2%)
2. Hindi (37.7%)
3. Urdu (16.5%)
4. Santali (3.02%)
5. Others (1.50%)

According to 2011 census, Bengali was the most spoken language in Kulti city with 1,29,229 speakers followed by Hindi at 1,18371, Urdu at 51,936, Santali at 9,498.

== Geography ==
Cities, towns and ECL Areas in the western portion of Asansol Sadar subdivision in Paschim Bardhaman district
MC: municipal corporation, P: rural administrative centre, CT: census town, N: neighbourhood, OG: out growth, T: temple
Owing to space constraints in the small map, the actual locations in a larger map may vary slightly

Kulti is located at latitude 23°43'60N and longitude 86°50'60E at an elevation of 114 meters.

As per the 2011 census, 83.33% of the population of Asansol Sadar subdivision was urban and 16.67% was rural. Asansol Sadar subdivision has 26 (+1 partly) Census Towns.(partly presented in the map alongside; all places marked on the map are linked in the full-screen map).

== Economy ==
Foundries of Kulti Works were as follows (year of establishment in brackets: Spun Pipe Plant No. 1 (1944), Spun Pipe Plant No. 2 (1958), Spun Pipe Plant No. 3 (1981), General Castings Shop (1915), Light Castings Shop (1875), Steel Foundry (1958), Non-ferrous Foundry (1948), Heavy Mechanised Foundry (1958), Pattern Shop (1915), Machine Shops (1900) and Laboratory (1870).

The Light Castings Foundry was possibly the first foundry unit at Kulti. It was established by the Eastern Light Castings Company Limited. The blast furnaces of Kulti were closed down in December 1958. Thereafter, the requirement of molten iron for Kulti’s foundries were met from Burnpur. Kulti was the first in India to produce spun pipes.

== Electoral Politics ==
As per orders of the Delimitation Commission, 282 Kulti assembly constituency covers Kulti municipality. Kulti assembly segment is part of Asansol (Lok Sabha constituency). Ujjal Chatterjee of Trinamool Congress won the Kulti assembly seat in 2006. Maniklal Acharya of Forward Bloc had won the seat in 2001. Prior to that the seat was won by Maniklal Acharjee of Forward Bloc in 1996 and 1991, Tuhin Samanta of Congress in 1987, Madhu Banerjee of Forward Bloc in 1982 and 1977. Ramdas Banerjee of Congress won in 1972 and 1971, Dr. Taraknath Chakrabarti of Samyukta Socialist Party won in 1969, Dr. Jai Narayan Sharma of Congress in 1967 and 1962, Benarasi Prasad Jha of PSP in 1957. In 1952, independent India's first election, Kulti was a twin member constituency, and those elected were Jai Narayan Sharma and Baidyanath Mondal, both of Congress.

== Kulti Club ==
Kulti Club serves as a central gathering point in Kulti. There is a swimming pool, billiard room, tennis courts, cricket field, bar, wooden dancing floor (as an auditorium and a stage etc.) At one point of time, this was rented out to marriage parties. Since then, such activities have become less common.

== See also ==
- Paschim Bardhaman district
- IISCO Steel Plant
- Kulti railway station
