= Satgram Area =

- Location in West Bengal Satgram Area (India)
- Location: 23°40′30″N 87°04′58″E
- Company: Eastern Coalfields Limited
- Website: http://www.easterncoal.gov.in/

Satgram Area is one of the 14 operational areas of Eastern Coalfields Limited located mainly in Asansol subdivision of Paschim Bardhaman district and partly in Bankura Sadar subdivision in Bankura district, both in the state of West Bengal, India.

== History ==
The earliest attempts at coal mining in India by Suetonius Grant Heatly and John Sumner were at places such as Ethora, Chinakuri, Damulia (Damalia?) and others further west and not identified with modern-day places. The earliest attempts did mark the historic beginning of coal mining in India but did not produce much coal. When people such as William Jones, Jeremiah Homfrey and the Erskine brothers and companies such as Alexander & Co. again made attempts at mining coal they did so at places such as Narainkuri and Mangalpore, in and around what is now the Satgram Area of ECL. It was here that Dwarkanath Tagore and his Carr, Tagore and Company entered the fledgling world of coal mining. In 1855, the East Indian Railway Company linked Raniganj with Kolkata, and ensured growth of the coal industry in the Raniganj Coalfield.

== Geography ==
Collieries in the Sripur and Satgram Areas of Eastern Coalfields
U: Underground Colliery, O: Open Cast Colliery, S: Mining support, A: Administrative headquarters
Owing to space constraints in the small map, the actual locations in a larger map may vary slightly

=== Location ===
The Satgram Area is located around 23.674889°N 87.082754°E

Located primarily in Paschim Bardhaman district, the Satgram extends into the coal mining areas in Bankura district, across the Damodar. It is bounded by the Sripur Area and Kunustoria Area on the north, Kajora Area/ Andal CD Block on the east, rural areas of Bankura district on the south and neighbourhoods of Asansol on the west.

The map alongside shows some of the collieries in the Areas. However, as the collieries do not have individual pages, there are no links in the full screen map.

=== Coal mining ===
As per Shodhganga website, collieries in the Satgram Area are: Kalidaspur, J.K.Nagar, Satgram, Ratibati, Chapui Khas, Mithapur, Nimcha, Jemehari, Pure Searsole, Tirath, Kuardih, Ardhagram OCP and Seetaldasji OCP.

As per ECL website telephone numbers, operational collieries in the Satgram Area in 2018 are: Chapui Khas Colliery, JK Nagar Project, Jemehari Colliery, Kalidaspur Project, Kuardi Colliery, Nimcha Colliery, Pure Searsole Colliery, Ratibati Colliery, Satgram Project and Satgram Incline.

Operational Areas of ECL (Source:ENVIS Centre on Environmental Problems of Mining)

== Mining plan ==
An overview of the proposed mining activity plan in Cluster 9, a group of 15 mines in the south-central part of Raniganj Coalfield and administratively under Satgram, Sripur and Kunustoria Areas of Eastern Coalfield, as of 2015–16, is as follows:

1. Ratibati underground mine, with normative annual production capacity of 0.09 million tonnes and peak annual production capacity of 0.12 mt, had an expected life of more than 40 years. Bogra (R-VI) seam was being worked with manual board and pillar development in one panel and mechanized development in another panel. The coal mined was dispatched to M.S. Railway Siding in J. K. Nagar 14–15 km away.
2. Chapuikhas UG mine, with normative annual production capacity of 0.05 million tonnes and peak annual production capacity of 0.06 mt, had an expected life of more than 50 years. Chapuikhas OC patch had an expected life of 1 year. Bogra (R-VI) seam is being developed by manual board and pillar method of mining. An opencast patch measuring 7 ha was proposed to be worked within the mine leasehold to prevent illegal mining.
3. Amritnagar UG mine, with normative annual production capacity of 1.14 million tonnes and peak annual production capacity of 1.14 mt, had an expected life of more than 30 years. Bogra (R-VI) seam was being worked in the mine. The mine was being developed using board and pillar method of mining.
4. Tirat UG mine, with normative annual production capacity of 0.06 million tonnes and peak annual production capacity of 0.08 mt, had an expected life of more than 10 years.
5. Kuardih UG mine, with normative annual production capacity of 0.05 million tonnes and peak annual production capacity of 0.07 mt, had an expected life of more than 10 years. Kuardih OC patch had an expected life of 2 years. Ghusick – A R-IXA) seam was being depillared by manual board and pillar method of mining with stowing. The coal mined was dispatched to M.S. Railway Siding in J. K. Nagar 14–15 km away.

Cities and towns in the eastern portion of Asansol Sadar subdivision in Paschim Bardhaman district
MC: Municipal Corporation, CT: census town, N: neighbourhood, R: rural centre
Owing to space constraints in the small map, the actual locations in a larger map may vary slightly

6. Nimcha UG mine, with normative annual production capacity of 0.31 million tonnes and peak annual production capacity of 0.40 mt, had an expected life of more than 50 years. Damalia OC patch had an expected life of 1 year. Nimcha Colliery consists of two units- (i) Nimcha 3 & 4 pit, (ii) Amkola 7 & 8 pit. The fairly steep gradient of the seams are around 1 in 25, and are of degree-II gassiness. In the Nimcha unit, R-IX seam is split into R-IX top and R-IX bottom seams. R-IX top seam is burnt. R-IX bottom seam is virgin. The R-VIII seam was being worked in the Nimcha unit. The Bogra (R-VI) and Satgram (R-V) seams are virgin in this unit. At the Amkola unit, R-IX combined is virgin. R-VIII and R-VII seams were being worked in Amkola unit. The coal mined was dispatched to Murgathole Railway Siding in J. K. Nagar 3–4 km away.
7. Ghusick UG mine, with normative annual production capacity of 0.05 million tonnes and peak annual production capacity of 0.10 mt, had an expected life of more than 50 years. Nega top seam, with a gradient of 1 in 18, and degree-II gassiness, was being worked. The coal mined was dispatched to M.S. Railway Siding in J. K. Nagar 14–15 km away.
8. Kalipahari UG mine, with normative annual production capacity of 0.05 million tonnes and peak annual production capacity of 0.10 mt, had an expected life of more than 50 years. Both Kalipahari OC patches A & B had an expected life of 2 years each and both OC patches C & D had an expected life of 1 year each. Kushadanga and Nega (top) seams were being depillared in the mine in conjunction with hydraulic sand stowing.
9. Muslia UG mine, with normative annual production capacity of 0.04 million tonnes and peak annual production capacity of 0.05 mt, had an expected life of more than 50 years. Muslia OC had an expected life of 5 years. Ghusick seam was being developed in the mine.
10. New Ghusick UG mine, with normative annual production capacity of 0.04 million tonnes and peak annual production capacity of 0.05 mt, had an expected life of more than 40 years. Nega (top) (R-VIIIT) seam was being worked with manual development by board and pillar method of mining. Depillaring in some limited sectors were done with hydraulic sandstowing in the past.
11. Jemehari UG mine, with normative annual production capacity of 0.03 million tonnes and peak annual production capacity of 0.04 mt, had an expected life of more than 10 years. Bogra (R-VI) seam was being developed by manual board and pillar method of mining. However, production was affected because of some problems.
12. JK Nagar UG mine, with normative annual production capacity of 0.35 million tonnes and peak annual production capacity of 0.87 mt, had an expected life of more than 30 years. In the proposed OC patches, while JK Nagar OC patch had an expected life of 3 years, both Pure Searsole and Mallick Basti OC patches had life of 1 year each. R-VI and R-V seams were being developed by the board and pillar method with SDL and LHD. R-VII seam was being worked at Pure Searsole by the manual board and pillar method.
13. Damra UG mine, with normative annual production capacity of 0.04 million tonnes and peak annual production capacity of 0.06 mt, had an expected life of more than 10 years. Production was affected.
14. Mahabir UG mine, with normative annual production capacity of 0.02 million tonnes and peak annual production capacity of 0.03 mt, had an expected life of more than 25 years. While both Mahabir OC patch and Narainkuri OC patch had an expected life of 4 years each, Egara OC patch had an expected life of 5 years. Plans were there to completely backfill these OC patches and reclaim them with plantation at the end of mining with no voids remaining.
15. Narainkuri UG mine, with normative annual production capacity of 0.54 million tonnes and peak annual production capacity of 0.54 mt, had an expected life of more than 25 years. There was a proposal to develop the mine by the board and pillar method using Continuous Miner followed by depillaring in conjunction with sand stowing using SDL machines.

See also – Sripur Area#Mining plan for Satgram and Mithapur collieries

== Illegal mining ==
Mines abandoned, after economic extraction is over, are the main sources of illegal mining. Illegal mining is generally done in small patches in a haphazard manner and mining sites keep on changing. Illegal mining leads to roof falling, water flooding, poisonous gas leaking, leading to the death of many labourers. As per the Ministry of Coal, Government of India, there are 203 illegal mining sites in ECL spread over Satgram, Sripur, Salanpur, Sodepur, Kunstoria, Pandveshwar, Mugma, Santhal Parganas Mines and Rajmahal.

== Subsidence ==
Traditionally many underground collieries have left a void after taking out the coal. As a result, almost all areas are facing subsidence. As per CMPDIL, there were 14 points of subsidence in the Satgram Area involving 1,336.52 hectares of land. The rail tracks passing through the Satgram Area are at a constant risk of subsidence as there are seven abandoned galleries below the rail tracks.

== Migrants ==
Prior to the advent of coal mining, the entire region was a low-productive rice crop area in what was once a part of the Jungle Mahals. The ownership of land had passed on from local adivasis to agricultural castes before mining started. However, the Santhals and the Bauris, referred to by the colonial administrators as "traditional coal cutters of Raniganj" remained attached to their lost land and left the mines for agricultural related work, which also was more remunerative. It forced the mine-owners to bring in outside labour, mostly from Bihar, Odisha and Uttar Pradesh. In time the migrants dominated the mining and industrial scenario. The pauperization and alienation of the adivasis have been major points of social concern.

== Transport ==
The Bardhaman-Asansol section, which is a part of Howrah-Gaya-Delhi line, Howrah-Allahabad-Mumbai line and Howrah-Delhi main line, passes through the Satgram Area.

NH 19 (old number NH 2) and NH 14 (old number NH 60) cross at Raniganj.

== Healthcare ==
The Satgram Hospital of ECL in Jamuria has 50 beds. The Searsole TB Hospital of ECL in Raniganj has 50 beds.
