= Salanpur (community development block) =

- Community development block
- Location in West Bengal
- Coordinates: 23°49′05″N 86°53′20″E
- Country: India
- State: West Bengal
- District: Paschim Bardhaman
- Parliamentary constituency: Asansol
- Assembly constituency: Barabani

Area
  - Total: 52.14 sq mi (135.05 km^{2})
- Elevation: 512 ft (156 m)

Population (2011)
  - Total: 160,357
  - Density: 3,075.3/sq mi (1,187.4/km^{2})
- Time zone: UTC+5.30 (IST)
- PIN: 713357 (Salanpur); 713364 (Rupnarayanpur Bazar)
- Telephone/STD code: 0341
- Vehicle registration: WB-37, WB-38, WB-41, WB-42, WB-44
- Literacy Rate: 78.76 per cent
- Website: bardhaman.gov.in

Salanpur is a community development block that forms an administrative division in Asansol subdivision of Paschim Bardhaman district in the Indian state of West Bengal.

== Geography ==
Rupnarainpur, a gram panchayat in Salanpur CD Block, is located at 23°49′05″N 86°53′20″E.

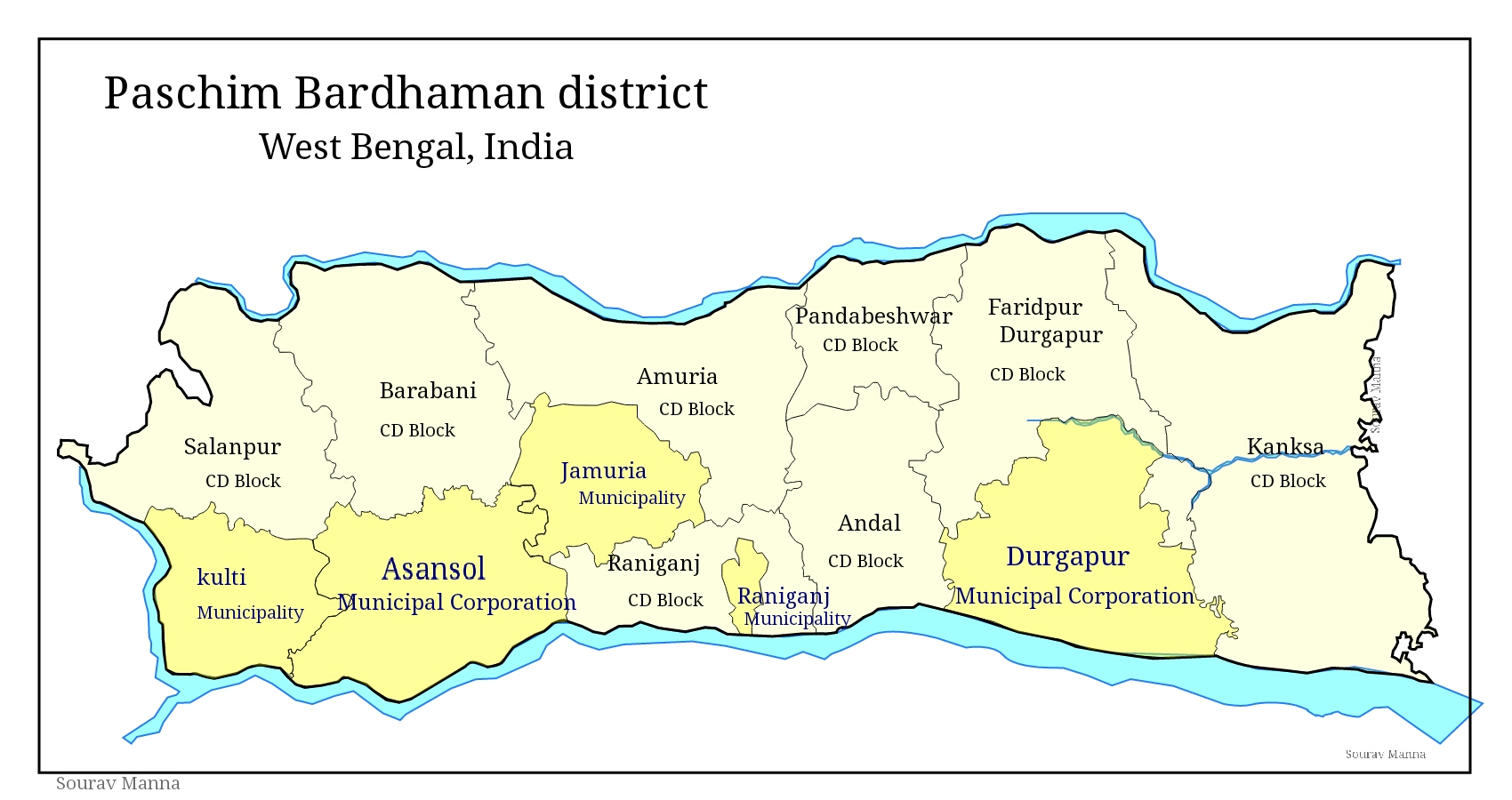
Map of Paschim Bardhaman district

Salanpur CD Block is bounded by Jamtara and Nala CD Blocks, in Jamtara district of Jharkhand, on the north, Barabani CD Block on the east, Asansol (municipal corporation) and after that Neturia CD Block, in Purulia district, on the south and Nirsa and Baliapur CD Blocks, in Dhanbad district of Jharkhand, on the west.

Salanpur CD Block has an area of 135.05 km^{2} (52.14 sq mi). It has 1 panchayat samity, 11 gram panchayats, 96 gram sansads (village councils), 74 mouzas and 69 inhabited villages. Chittaranjan and Salanpur police stations serve this block. Headquarters of this CD Block is at Rupnarayanpur.

Gram panchayats of Salanpur block/panchayat samiti are: Achhra, Alladi, Basudevpur-Jemari, Dendua, Ethora, Fulberia-Bolkunda, Jitpur-Uttarrampur, Kallya, Rupnarayanpur, Salanpur and Samdi.

== Demographics ==
=== Population ===
As per the 2011 Census of India Salanpur CD Block had a total population of 160,357, of which 101,360 were rural and 61,697 were urban. There were 83,796 (51%) males and 79,261 (49%) females. Population below 6 years was 17,118. Scheduled Castes numbered 39,294 (24.10%) and Scheduled Tribes numbered 17,084 (10.48%).

As per 2001 census, Salanpur block had a total population of 156,338, out of which 82,741 were males and 73,597 were females. Salanpur block registered a population growth of 9.64 per cent during the 1991-2001 decade. Decadal growth for Bardhaman district was 14.36 per cent. Decadal growth in West Bengal was 17.84 per cent. Scheduled castes at 35,898 formed around one-fifth the population. Scheduled tribes numbered 17,143.

Census Towns in Salanpur CD Block are (2011 census figures in brackets): Chittaranjan (39,098) and Hindusthan Cables Town (22,599).

Large villages (with 4,000+ population) in Salanpur CD Block are (2011 census figures in brackets): Salanpur (4,739), Jemari (4,321), Ethora (4,547) and Kalya (703).

Other villages in Salanpur CD Block include (2011census figures in brackets): Alladi (2,384), Dendua (2,297), Rupnarayanpur (2,242), Uttarrampur (1,331), Jitpur (1,532), Achhra (2,584), Phulberya (1,918), Bolkunda (1,351), Shyamdi (3,265) and Basudebpur (3,098).

=== Literacy ===
As per the 2011 census the total number of literates in Salanpur CD Block was 114,940 (78.76% of the population over 6 years) out of which males numbered 64,520 (86.12% of the male population over 6 years) and females numbered 50,420 (70.99% of the female population over 6 years). The gender disparity (the difference between female and male literacy rates) was 15.13%.

As per 2001 census, Salanpur block had a total literacy of 78.22 per cent for the 6+ age group. While male literacy was 87.07 per cent female literacy was 68.20 per cent. Bardhaman district had a total literacy of 70.18 per cent, male literacy being 78.63 per cent and female literacy being 60.95 per cent.

See also – List of West Bengal districts ranked by literacy rate

Literacy in CD blocks of
Bardhaman district
Bardhaman Sadar North subdivision
Ausgram I – 69.39%
Ausgram II – 68.00%
Bhatar – 71.56%
Burdwan I – 76.07%
Burdwan II – 74.12%
Galsi II – 70.05%
Bardhaman Sadar South subdivision
Khandaghosh – 77.28%
Raina I – 80.20%
Raina II – 81.48%
Jamalpur – 74.08%
Memari I – 74.10%
Memari II – 74.59%
Kalna subdivision
Kalna I – 75.81%
Kalna II – 76.25%
Manteswar – 73.08%
Purbasthali I – 77.59%
Purbasthali II – 70.35%
Katwa subdivision
Katwa I – 70.36%
Katwa II – 69.16%
Ketugram I – 68.00%
Ketugram II – 65.96%
Mongalkote – 67.97%
Durgapur subdivision
Andal – 77.25%
Faridpur Durgapur – 74.14%
Galsi I – 72.81%
Kanksa – 76.34%
Pandabeswar – 73.01%
Asansol subdivision
Barabani – 69.58%
Jamuria – 69.42%
Raniganj – 73.86%
Salanpur – 78.76%
2011 Census: CD Block Wise

Primary Census Abstract Data

=== Language and religion ===
Religion in Salanpur CD block (2011)
Hinduism	94.31%
Islam	3.57%
Christianity	1.11%
Other (tribal religion)	0.58%
Other or not stated	0.43%

In the 2011 census Hindus numbered 153,776 and formed 94.31% of the population in Salanpur CD Block. Muslims numbered 5,825 and formed 3.57% of the population. Christians numbered 1,816 and formed 1.11% of the population. Others numbered 1,640 and formed 1.01% of the population.

Languages of Salanpur CD block (2011)
1. Bengali (67.0%)
2. Hindi (19.8%)
3. Santali (9.35%)
4. Khortha (0.95%)
5. Others (2.87%)

At the time of the 2011 census, 67.03% of the population spoke Bengali, 19.80% Hindi, 9.35% Santali and 0.95% Khortha as their first language.

== Rural poverty ==
As per poverty estimates obtained from household survey for families living below poverty line in 2005, rural poverty in Salanpur CD Block was 24.27%.

== Economy ==
=== Livelihood ===
Livelihood
in Salanpur CD Block
1. Cultivators (4.41%)
2. Agricultural labourers (6.44%)
3. Household industries (2.22%)
4. Other Workers (86.8%)

In Salanpur CD Block in 2011, amongst the class of total workers, cultivators numbered 2,291 and formed 4.41% of the total workers, agricultural labourers numbered 3,288 and formed 6.44%, household industry workers numbered 1,133 and formed 2.22% and other workers numbered 44.346 and formed 86.85%. Total workers numbered 51,058 and formed 31.31% of the total population, and non-workers numbered 111,999 and formed 68.69% of the population.

Coalmines are spread across the Andal, Pandaveswar, Raniganj, Jamuria, Barabani and Salanpur region, including municipal areas. Livelihood in this region is coal-centred. The area does not produce much of agricultural products. Overall work participation rate, and female work participation rate, in the mining area are low. Interestingly the work participation rate in the predominantly agricultural rural areas of erstwhile Bardhaman district is higher than in the predominantly urbanised mining area. Human development in the mining area does not at all look good. However, in the composite livelihood index the mining area performs much better than the non-mining areas of erstwhile Bardhaman district. The decadal (1991-2001) change in composition of workers shows the growing pressure of population growth, as well as of migrants from adjacent Jharkhand.

Note: In the census records a person is considered a cultivator, if the person is engaged in cultivation/ supervision of land owned by self/government/institution. When a person who works on another person's land for wages in cash or kind or share, is regarded as an agricultural labourer. Household industry is defined as an industry conducted by one or more members of the family within the household or village, and one that does not qualify for registration as a factory under the Factories Act. Other workers are persons engaged in some economic activity other than cultivators, agricultural labourers and household workers. It includes factory, mining, plantation, transport and office workers, those engaged in business and commerce, teachers, entertainment artistes and so on.

=== Infrastructure ===
All 74 or 100% of mouzas in Salanpur CD Block were electrified by 31 March 2014.

All 74 mouzas in Salanpur CD Block had drinking water facilities in 2013–14. There were 9 fertiliser depots, 3 seed stores and 32 fair price shops in the CD Block.

=== Coal mining ===
Coal mining in India first started in the Raniganj Coalfield. In 1774, John Sumner and Suetonius Grant Heatly of the British East India Company found coal near Ethora, presently in Salanpur CD Block.

See also – Salanpur Area and Sodepur Area of Eastern Coalfields

Mohanpur open cast project in Salanpur Area of Eastern Coalfields is undergoing expansion to 2.5 million tonnes per year. Gourandi Extension In Salanpur Area of Eastern Coalfields has a mineable reserve of 15.44 million tonnes.

With extensive underground mining for many years, this area has been facing the problem of land subsidence. About 361 villages under the Raniganj and Salanpur coalfield areas are the victims of subsidence.

=== Industry ===
Chittaranjan Locomotive Works at Chittaranjan is one of the largest electric locomotive manufacturers in the world. Established in 1950, it produced steam locomotives up to 1972. It is named after the great Indian independence movement activist, Chittaranjan Das.

The Rupnarayanpur unit of Hindustan Cables was closed on 1 February 2017. Hindustan Cables was set up in 1952 at Rupnarayanpur. It later set up units at Hyderabad and Naini, Allahabad. Both the Rupnarayanpur and Hyderabad units, which produced polythene insulated jelly filled cables, had stopped producing in 2003, as BSNL and MTNL did not need such cables anymore.

Bhushan Steel signed an agreement with the West Bengal government to set a 2 million tonne steel plant, with auxiliary facilities, at Salanpur, in 2007. The company expected to get around 2,500 acres of land acquired in the subsequent one year and start production in 2012. With growing resistance to land acquisition the state government was not able to make much headway. In 2012, Bhusan Steel put the project on hold.

=== Agriculture ===
Although the Bargadari Act of 1950 recognised the rights of bargadars to a higher share of crops from the land that they tilled, it was not implemented fully. Large tracts, beyond the prescribed limit of land ceiling, remained with the rich landlords. From 1977 onwards major land reforms took place in West Bengal. Land in excess of land ceiling was acquired and distributed amongst the peasants. Following land reforms land ownership pattern has undergone transformation. In 2013–14, persons engaged in agriculture in Salanpur CD Block could be classified as follows: bargadars 2.44%, patta (document) holders 37.94%, small farmers (possessing land between 1 and 2 hectares) 5.68%, marginal farmers (possessing land up to 1 hectare) 27.08% and agricultural labourers 26.86%.

In 2003-04 net cropped area in Salanpur CD Block was 4,681 hectares and the area in which more than one crop was grown was 946 hectares.

In 2013–14, Salanpur CD Block produced 17,215 tonnes of Aman paddy, the main winter crop, from 8,142 hectares. It also produced pulses.

=== Banking ===
In 2013–14, Salanpur CD Block had offices of 7 commercial banks and 2 gramin banks.

== Transport ==
Salanpur CD Block has 6 originating/ terminating bus routes.

The Asansol-Patna section of the Howrah-Delhi main line passes through this CD Block. There are stations at Salanpur and Rupnarayanpur,

The Kolkata-Delhi NH 19 (old numbering NH 2) passes through this block.

State Highway 5 (West Bengal) running from Rupnarayanpur (in Bardhaman district) to Junput (in Purba Medinipur district) originates from this block.

Asansol-Chittaranjan road links to both NH 19 and Grand Trunk Road and thereafter it links to Jamtara in Jharkhand and from there to places such as Dumka and Karmatanr.

== Education ==
In 2013–14, Salanpur CD Block had 75 primary schools with 10,260 students, 4 middle schools with 379 students, 6 high schools with 3,634 students and 9 higher secondary schools with 7,894 students. Salanpur CD Block had 1 general college with 1,411 students, 5 technical/ professional institution with 730 students and 274 institutions for special and non-formal education with 9,079 students.

Deshbandhu Mahavidyalaya was established at Chittaranjan in 1973. It is affiliated with the Kazi Nazrul University.

== Culture ==
Kalyaneshwari Temple is a 500-year-old centre of Shakti worship. Legend has it that human sacrifices were offered at Kalyaneshwari in the remote past. The present temple, however, is not very old and was constructed by Panchakot Raj. The temple of Goddess Kalyaneshwari is believed to fulfill the wishes of childless women.

== Healthcare ==
In 2014, Salanpur CD Block had 1 block primary health centre, 3 primary health centres, 2 medical institutions of central government/ PSUs and 2 private nursing homes with total 517 beds and 52 doctors (excluding private bodies). It had 13 family welfare sub centres. 10,229 patients were treated indoor and 117,995 patients were treated outdoor in the hospitals, health centres and subcentres of the CD Block.

Pithaikeary Rural Hospital, with 30 beds, at Rupnarayanpur, is the major government medical facility in the Salanpur CD block. There are primary health centres at Dabor, PO Achra (with 10 beds), and Parbotpur, PO Samdi (with 2 beds). Kasturba Gandhi Hospital at Chittaranjan functions with 150 beds.
