= Indian coal mining women =

In India, coal mining women were common in the early 20th century, increasingly regulated from 1929, prohibited from mines in 1937 and reinstated in 1943. The prohibition was reinstated in 1946 and later lifted in 2019.

The earliest Indian women to be employed in coal mine-related work were the Bauris, Dhangars and Koras, and were chiefly involved with surface work. With the advent of Indian Railways, the Santhal Parganas women became the first women to work inside the coal mines of Raniganj, alongside their men folk. By the end of the First World War 49,500 women worked in underground mines. Between August 1943 and February 1946, during the Bengal famine and Second World War, most worked in the eastern provinces of Bengal and Bihar, numbered around 70,000, and sustained production of coal.

In 2021 Akanksha Kumari became the first woman mining engineer to work in an underground mine in India.

== Before 1900 ==
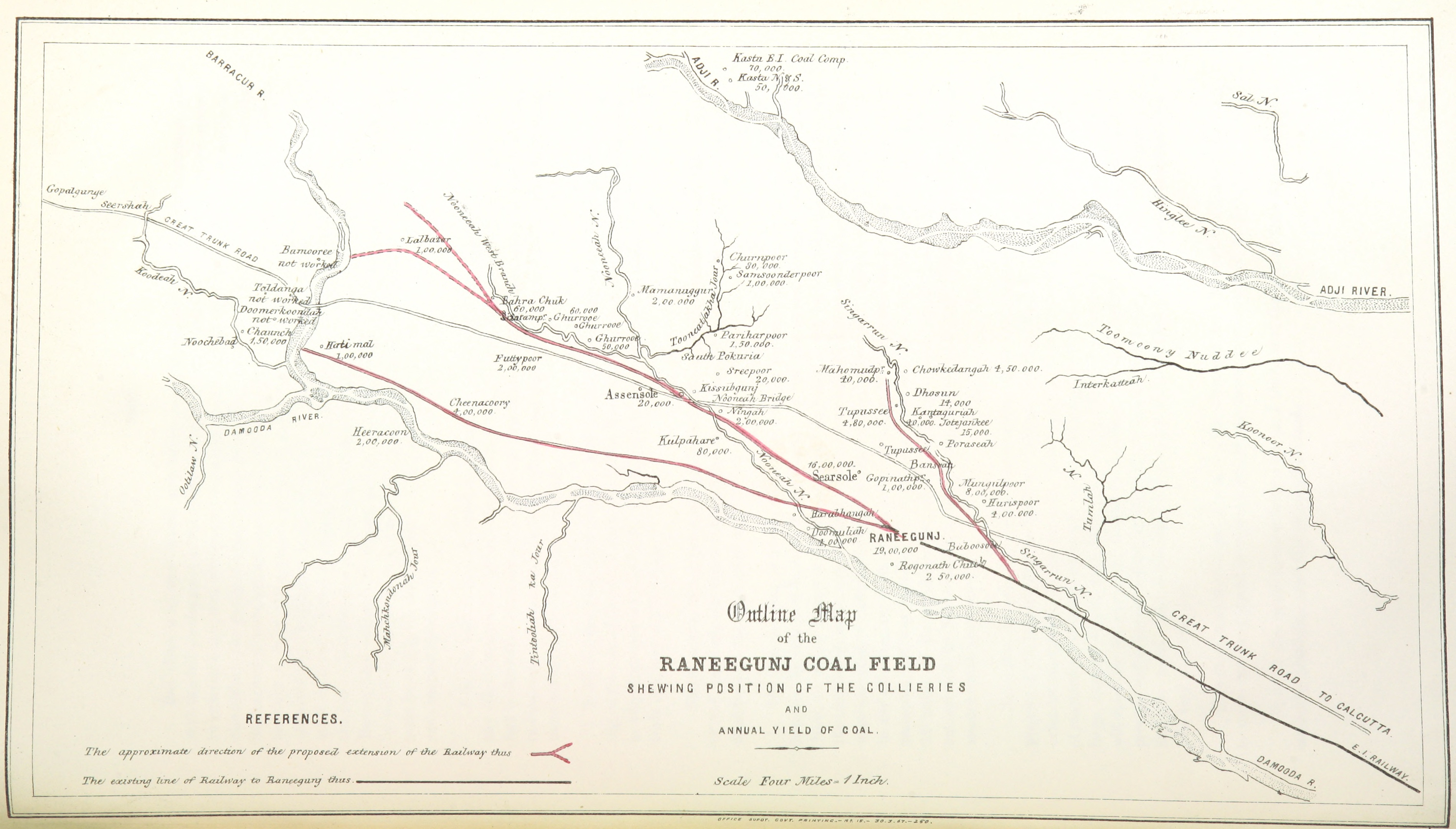
Raniganj Coalfield in 1867

The earliest Indian women to be employed in Indian coal mine related work were the Bauris, Dhangars and Koras, and were chiefly involved with surface work, with some working in open mines and quarries, where they carried an average of 50 to 60lbs of weight. Other work delegated to women in open mines included carrying material up inclines. They were also involved in taking out coal and waste from the pit head and stacking the coal. The Bauri women came to be known as the "gin-women" as they were tasked with turning the wooden 'gin' (a sort of modified horse gin), for lifting coal from the pits using iron chains. A description of Bauri women workers at the Raniganj coal mines, given by a Mrs Bental, reported that "the women are also best for turning the windlass that lifts the buckets at the shafts, 32 of them at once work the wheel with a peculiar spring or jump forwards and then a run, they sing all the while but in wild harsh tone. The Scotch engineer told us that these women are quarrelsome and more troublesome than the men and one of his punishments was a short lock up in a godown warehouse". As mines became mechanised by electric and steam winding engines, gin women were redirected to screen, load and push wagon filled coal to the railway sides. Some were tasked to remove boiler ash, push unloaded coal and sprinkle water on coal.

With the advent of Indian Railways, the Santhal Parganas women became the first women to work inside the coal mines of Raniganj, alongside their men folk. There, they would load the coal cut by their men. Some bailed water from the mines and removed coal from the galleries. Most were of low caste, and among those of high castes were mainly widows without financial support, socially isolated or from poor families. By the turn of the 20th century, there was a total of around 18,500 women working underground and 9,400 on the surface.

== First World War ==
During the First World War, the number of coal mines in India rose by more than 300 and production increased from 16 million to 20 millions tons. 49,500 women worked in underground mines by the end of the War.

== Interwar years ==
The Indian Mining Act (1923) discouraged the sending of women down coal mines; it was seen as dangerous and unfit work for women. The mining regulations of 1929 resulted in the already low paid women being employed in less numbers and with less pay. They were completely prohibited from mines in 1937.

== Second World War ==
Permitting women back in Indian coal mines was reinstated in 1943 during the Bengal famine and Second World War. Between August 1943 and February 1946 most worked in the eastern provinces of Bengal and Bihar, numbered around 70,000, and sustained production of coal. These women included Somi Bowri, who went to live her husband at age 14 years, two years after they married. They had seven children and entered the coalfields in their mid-thirties after being driven by a reduced income from their traditional farming work. Another was Radhi Domin, widowed at age eight after being married at two, she then married a widower at age 16 and both worked as manual labourers in coal mines.

== Post war ==
In 1946, the prohibition of employing Indian women in coal mines was reinstated.

== 21st century ==
In February 2019, the prohibition on women working in coal mines was lifted. In 2021 Akanksha Kumari became the first woman mining engineer to work in an underground mine in India.

== See also ==
- Bevin Boys
- Kamini Roy
