= Sodepur Area =

Coal mine area in West Bengal, India

- Location in West Bengal Sodepur Area (India)
- Location: 23°41′12″N 86°52′24″E
- Products: Non-coking coal
- Company: Eastern Coalfields Limited
- Website: http://www.easterncoal.gov.in/

Sodepur Area is one of the 14 operational areas of Eastern Coalfields Limited located mainly in Asansol subdivision of Paschim Bardhaman district and partly of Raghunathpur subdivision in Purulia district, both in the state of West Bengal, India.

== History ==
The earliest attempts at coal mining in India by Suetonius Grant Heatly and John Sumner were at places such as Ethora, Chinakuri and others further west and not identified with modern-day places. Chinakuri is in what is now the Sodepur Area of ECL. In 1843, when Carr, Tagore and Company joined hands with Gilmore Homfray and Company to form the Bengal Coal Company, the new company had its headquarters at Sanctoria in what is now the Sodepur Area.

== Geography ==
Interactive map of collieries in the Sodepur Area of Eastern Coalfields. Abbreviations used:
: Underground Colliery,: Open Cast Colliery, S: Mining support, A: Administrative headquarters
On click through locations on larger map may vary slightly.

=== Location ===
The Sodepur Area is located around 23.6868°N 86.8732°E

Located primarily in Paschim Bardhaman district, the Sodepur Area extends into the coal mining areas in Purulia district, across the Damodar. It is bounded by the Salanpur Area on the north, neighbourhoods of Asansol on the east, rural areas of Purulia district on the south and the Mugma Area, in Dhanbad district of Jharkhand, across the Barakar on the west.

The map alongside shows some of the collieries in the Area. However, as the collieries do not have individual pages, there are no links in the full screen map.

=== Coal mining ===
As per the Shodhganga website, collieries in the Sodepur Area of Eastern Coalfields are: Sodepur, Mouthdih, Parbelia, Dubeswari, Chinakuri I, Chinakuri II, Chinakuri III, Ranipur and Poidih.

As per the Shodhganga website, collieries in the Sitarampur Area of Eastern Coalfields are: Mithani, Bejdi, Dhemomain, Narsamuda, BC Incline and Patmohana.

As per the ECL website telephone numbers, operational collieries in the Sodepur Area in 2018 are: Bejdih Colliery, Chinakuri I & II Colliery, Chinakuri III Colliery, Dhemomain Incline Colliery, Dhemomain Pit Colliery, Dubeswary Colliery, Methani Colliery, Mouthdih Colliery, Narsamuda Colliery, Parbelia Colliery, Patmohana Colliery and Sodepur Colliery. This website does not show Sitarampur as a separate Area.

Operational Areas of ECL (Source:ENVIS Centre on Environmental Problems of Mining)

== Mining plan ==
The mines of Cluster 5 are in the south-western part of Raniganj Coalfield and south or right bank of the Damodar River in the Purulia district of West Bengal. An overview of the proposed mining activity plan in Cluster 5, a group of 2 mines in the Sodepur Area, as of 2015–16, is as follows:

1. Parbelia underground mine, with normative annual production capacity of 0.15 million tonnes and peak annual production capacity of 0.19mt, had an expected life of more than 25 years. Parbelia open cast patch had an expected life of 1.5 years. The mine has one depillaring panel by caving method with manual loading and one development section with 2 nos. of SDLs.
2. Dubeswari UG mine, with normative annual production capacity of 0.135 mt and peak annual production capacity of 0.18 mt, had an expected life of more than 50 years. Dubswari OC patch had an expected life of 2.5 years. Dubeswari colliery was working the Hijuli seam (R-VIII) through three inclines No. 1, 2 & 3. Two districts were running; one depillaring with caving in Panel-P2 and the other depillaring with stowing in Panel-A.

The mines in cluster 6 are in the western part of Raniganj Coalfield and are situated towards west of Asansol and IISCO Steel Plant. Damodar River forms the boundary of the cluster on the southwest. An overview of the proposed mining activity plan in Cluster 6, a group of 9 mines in the Sodepur Area, as of 2015–16, is as follows:

1. Dhemomain underground mine, with normative annual production capacity of 0.155 million tonnes and peak annual production capacity of 0.21 mt, had an expected life of over 50 years. At Dhemomain incline one, bord and pillar development district was being run with SDLs. The fallen coal from old working was being loaded by UG loaders. One depillaring district was about to be started. At Dhemomain pit, one bord and pillar development district was running with manual loading.

Cities, towns and ECL Areas in the western portion of Asansol Sadar subdivision in Paschim Bardhaman district
M: municipal corporation, P: rural administrative centre, C: census town, N: neighbourhood, O: out growth, T: temple. A: area office
Owing to space constraints in the small map, the actual locations in a larger map may vary slightly

2. Sodepur UG mine, with normative annual production capacity of 0.12 mt and peak annual production capacity of 0.15 mt, had an expected life of over 10 years. Sodepur open cast patch had an expected life of 2 years. In Sodepur UG mine, depillaring operation was going on in Hatnal seam (R-III). Out of the three working panels stowing was being done in two panels.
3. Narsamuda UG mine, with normative annual production capacity of 0.148 mt and peak annual production capacity of 0.19 mt, had an expected life of over 10 years. The Narsamuda UG mine was being worked by the board and pillar method with manual loading. Two depillaring panels were running; one with caving method and another with limited span method. One development section was also running.
4. Patmohana UG mine, with normative annual production capacity of 0.12 mt and peak annual production capacity of 0.12 mt, had an expected life of over 40 years. The proposed Patmohana OC patch had an expected life of 1 year. In Patmohana UG mine only one depillaring district at west side was being run with caving method.
5. Chinakuri I UG mine, with normative annual production capacity of 0.06 mt and peak annual production capacity of 0.08 mt, had an expected life of over 50 years. In Chinakuri I UG mine, one development district was running with CCM. In another panel depillaring was being done by longwall retreating method with hydraulic stowing. Average depth of the mine was 600m.
6. Chinakuri III UG mine, with normative annual production capacity of 0.15 mt and peak annual production capacity of 0.20 mt, had an expected life of over 25 years. The proposed Chinakuri OC patch had an expected life of 1 year. In Chinakuri III UG mine, Barachak seam was being worked. Previous depillaring had been done by caving method but later working goaf pillar method was being followed in one district. Another depillaring district was being worked with hydraulic sand stowing. One development section in the east of main dip section was being worked with SDL.
7. Bejdih I UG mine, with normative annual production capacity of 0.04 mt and peak annual production capacity of 0.10 mt, had an expected life of over 20 years. In Bejdih UG mine, Incline I & 2, manual development work was being carried out in Sripur (R-VI) seam. In Pit No. 1, Raghunath purbati (R-VA) and Baradhemo (R-V) seams had been exhausted.
8. Methani UG mine, with normative annual production capacity of 0.10 mt and peak annual production capacity of 0.20 mt, had an expected life of over 20 years. The proposed Methani OC patch had an expected life of 1.5 years. In Methani UG mine, manual development was being carried out in Baradhemo (R-V) seam, through Pit No. 1.
9. Sheetalpur UG mine, with normative annual production capacity of 0.12 mt and peak annual production capacity of 0.50 mt, had an expected life of over 30 years.

Places in Raghunathpur subdivision in Purulia district
M: municipal town, C: census town, R: rural/ urban centre, H: historical/ religious centre, T: tourist centre
Owing to space constraints in the small map, the actual locations in a larger map may vary slightly

== Chinakuri ==
Chinakuri mining area is located in the south-western part of Raniganj Coalfield and is under the administrative control of the Sodepur Area of ECL. The pits of the colliery are located to the north of the Damodar, while the mine workings are to the south. It is the deepest coal mine in India. A total of ten standard coal seams are present in Raniganj Coalfield of which seams R-VII, R-IV, R-X, and partially R-II have been worked or are being worked within the Chinakuri Colliery.

In Mine No. 1 galleries and longwall panels were developed till 1994 to a depth of 700 m (2,300 ft). The last available longwall panel was exhausted in November 2008. 68.46 million tonnes of coal reserves were available in the virgin areas of Mine No. 1. As of 2016, there was no active mining in Mine No. 1, but plans were there to start mining again in Mine No. 1.

Mine No 2 has exhausted its reserves.

As of 2016, the focus was on developing seam R-VIII in Mine No. 3. Seam R-VIII (Borachak/ Hijuli) has a total geological reserve of 22 million tonnes and was being worked by Mine No. 3 and Parbelia Colliery. Its depth exceeds 600 m (1,968 ft).

Coal blocks held by CIL overlap 81 percent of India's potential area exploitable by CBM/CMM. Based on the average Seam R-IV, in Mine No. 1, gas content, it is estimated that the virgin portion of the study area holds approximately 11.6 Bcf, or 328 Mm3, of gas resources. Efforts are on to recover this gas.

== Illegal mining ==
Mines abandoned, after economic extraction is over, are the main sources of illegal mining, which is generally done in small patches in a haphazard manner and mining sites keep on changing. Illegal mining leads to roof falling, water flooding, poisonous gas leaking, leading to the death of many labourers. As per the Ministry of Coal, Government of India, there are 203 illegal mining sites in ECL spread over Satgram, Sripur, Salanpur, Sodepur, Kunstoria, Pandveshwar, Mugma, Santhal Parganas Mines and Rajmahal.

== Subsidence ==
Traditionally many underground collieries have left a void after taking out the coal. As a result, almost all areas are facing subsidence. As per CMPDIL, there were 7 points of subsidence in the Sodepur Area involving 121.16 hectares of land.

== Accidents ==
Amongst the major accidents in Indian coal mines in the post-independence period, 3 have occurred in what is now the Sodepur Area. On 12 July 1952, 12 people were killed in Dhemomain Colliery, then owned by Dhemo Main Collieries Limited, because of roof fall. On 26 September 1956, 28 people were killed in Burra Dhemo Colliery, then owned by North Dhemo Coal Company, because of inundation. On 19 February 1958, 175 people were killed in Chinakuri Colliery, then owned by Bengal Coal Company, because of explosion of fire damp.

According to an Envis report about the accident at Burra Dhemo, "There was an abnormally heavy rainfall on 25th September (315 mm) and 26th September, 1956 (142 mm) and all the water courses were flooded leading to submergence of the surrounding areas… Increased percolation of water through the strata caused the roof over a gallery in old workings to collapse right through to the surface creating a hole of about 5 m x 1.6 m. Water rushed into the underground workings through this hole flooding all the dip workings in a couple of minutes. 28 persons working in the dip area were drowned. However, 11 persons who got trapped in the rise area due to the submergence of the exits (one shaft and one incline) came out after 19 days. How they had survived for those 19 days in the dark confines below ground and still had the strength to walk up the incline at the end of the ordeal is nothing short of a miracle."

"The Chinakuri Colliery was a combined mine consisting of the workings of Nos. 1 and 2 pits colliery and of No.3 pit colliery working the Disergarh seam. The Disergarh seam was known to produce inflammable gas and its average make in the workings of Nos. 1 and 2 pits was 8.5 m^{3}/ min. The explosion took place in the workings of Nos. l and 2 pits on 19th February, 1958." Efforts were made to save as many persons as possible and bring the fire under control. When preliminary efforts to control the fire failed and more explosions occurred the mine was flooded with water to control the fire. Altogether 20 men were rescued and out of them 4 died later. "The large majority of the dead bodies was found at or near the working faces suggesting that they were overpowered by such an unexpected danger that they could not make the least attempt to save themselves."

According to CMPDI Report (1988), fire affected areas in Raniganj Coalfield had been identified at Dishergarh, Sanctoria, Amritnagar, Jay Kay Nagar, Laikdih, Victoria West and Damogoria. Fire was also reported from private mining areas like Sarisatali in the Salanpur Area.

== Migrants ==
Prior to coal mining, the entire region was a low-productive rice crop area in what was once a part of the Jungle Mahals. The ownership of land had passed on from local adivasis to agricultural castes before mining started. However, the Santhals and the Bauris, referred to by the colonial administrators as "traditional coal cutters of Raniganj" remained attached to their lost land and left the mines for agricultural related work, which also was more remunerative. It forced the mine-owners to bring in outside labour, mostly from Bihar, Odisha and Uttar Pradesh. In time the migrants dominated the mining and industrial scenario. The pauperization and alienation of the adivasis have been major points of social concern.

== Transport ==
The Asansol–Gaya section, which is a part of Howrah–Gaya–Delhi line and Howrah–Allahabad–Mumbai line passes through the northern edges of the Sodepur Area.

There are freight lines in the Sodepur Area to take out the coal.

The Grand Trunk Road passes through the northern parts of the Sodepur Area and crosses over to Dhanbad district in Jharkhand over a bridge across the Barakar. State Highway 5 passes through the Sodepur Area, crossing over to the colliery areas in Purulia district, over a bridge across the Damodar.

== Healthcare ==
The Sactoria Hospital of ECL in Disergarh functions with 250 beds.

Medical facilities (dispensaries) in the Sodepur Area of ECL are available at Chinakuri I & II (PO Sundarchak), Chinakuri Mine III (PO Radhanagar), Parbelia (PO Neturia), Narsamuda (PO Mithani), Bejdih (PO Kulti), Mithani (PO Mithani), Patmohna (PO Patmohna), Sodepur 9/10 (PO Sundarchak), Mouthdih (PO Sundarchak), Dhemo Main (PO Main Dhemo).
