= Salanpur =

- Village
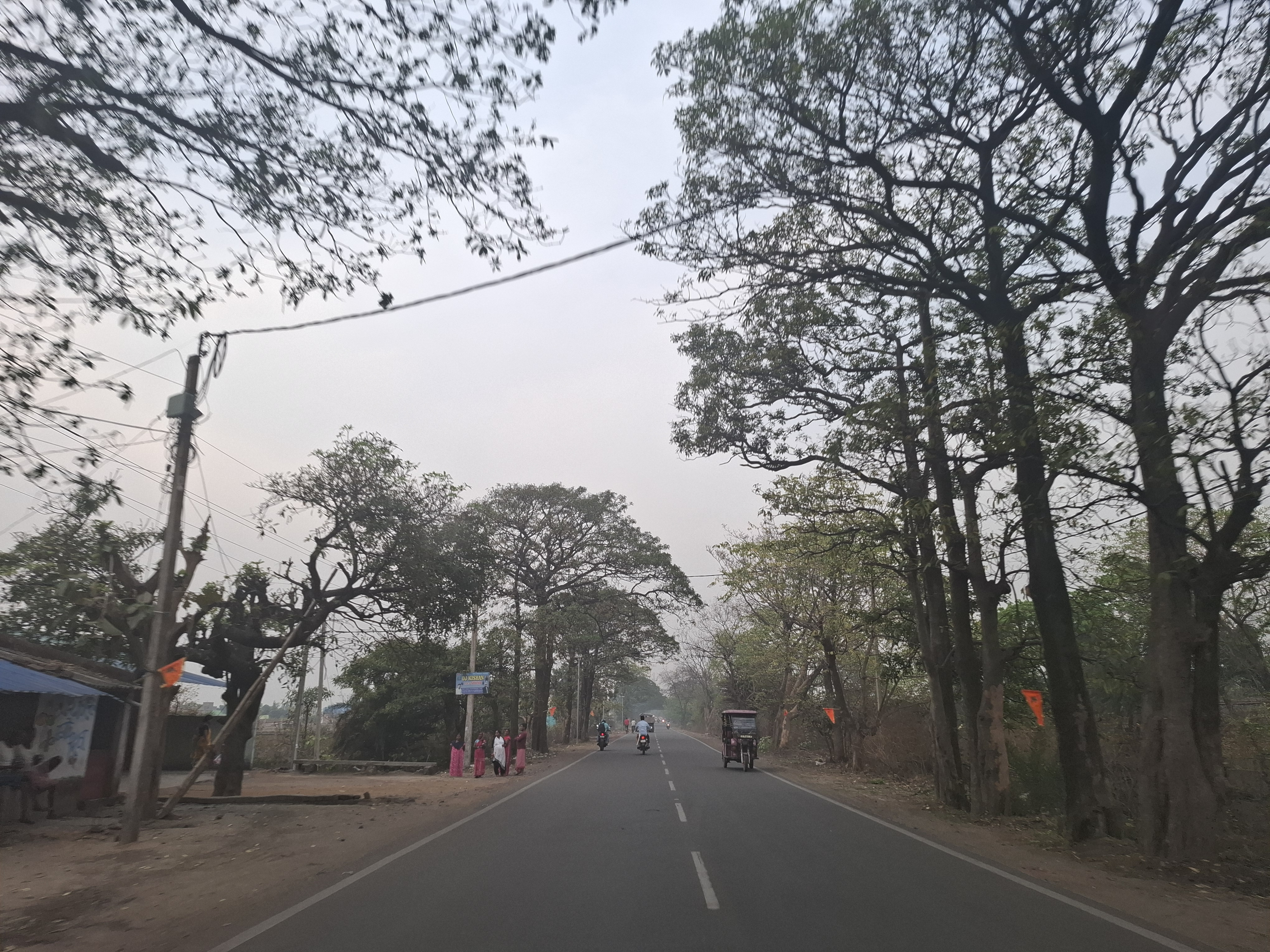
- Salanpur village

- Location in West Bengal, India Salanpur (India)
- Coordinates: 23°46′36.1″N 86°52′35.4″E
- Country: India
- State: West Bengal
- District: Paschim Bardhaman

Population (2011)
  - Total: 4,739

Languages*
  - Official: Bengali, Hindi, English
- Time zone: UTC+5:30 (IST)
- PIN: 713357 (Salanpur)
- Telephone/STD code: 0341
- Lok Sabha constituency: Asansol
- Vidhan Sabha constituency: Barabani
- Website: paschimbardhaman.co.in

Salanpur is a village, in the Salanpur CD block in the Asansol Sadar subdivision of the Paschim Bardhaman district in the state of West Bengal, India.

== Geography ==
Cities, towns and ECL Areas in the western portion of Asansol Sadar subdivision in Paschim Bardhaman district
MC: municipal corporation, P: rural administrative unit, CT: census town, N: neighbourhood, OG: out growth, T: temple
Owing to space constraints in the small map, the actual locations in a larger map may vary slightly

=== Urbanisation ===
As per the 2011 census, 83.33% of the population of Asansol Sadar subdivision was urban and 16.67% was rural. In 2015, the municipal areas of Kulti, Raniganj and Jamuria were included within the jurisdiction of Asansol Municipal Corporation. Asansol Sadar subdivision has 26 (+1 partly) Census Towns.(partly presented in the map alongside; all places marked on the map are linked in the full-screen map).

== Civic administration ==
=== Police station ===
Salanpur police station has jurisdiction over a part of Salanpur CD block. The area covered is 52.09 km^{2} and the population covered is 119,142.

== Demographics ==
According to the 2011 Census of India Salanpur had a total population of 4,739 of which 2,454 (52%) were males and 2,285 (48%) were females. Population in the age range 0-6 years was 658. The total number of literate persons in Salanpur was 2,909 (71.28% of the population over 6 years).

*For language details see Salanpur (community development block)#Language and religion

== Economy ==
=== Coal mining ===
As per ECL website telephone numbers, operational collieries in the Salanpur Area of Eastern Coalfields in 2018 are: Bonjemehari Colliery, Barmondia Colliery, Dabor Colliery, Gourandi Colliery, Gourandi Begunia Colliery and Mohonpur OCP.

=== Industry ===
Bhushan Steel signed an agreement with the West Bengal government to set up a 2 million tonne steel plant, with auxiliary facilities, at Salanpur, in 2007. The company expected to get around 2,500 acres of land acquired in the subsequent one year and start production in 2012. With growing resistance to land acquisition the state government was not able to make much headway. In 2012, Bhusan Steel put the project on hold.

== Transport ==
There is a station at Salanpur on the Asansol-Patna section of the Howrah-Delhi main line.

State Highway 5 running from Rupnarayanpur (in Paschim Bardhaman district) to Junput (in Purba Medinipur district) passes through Salanpur. It links to the Kolkata-Delhi NH 19, passing nearby.

== Education ==
Gyan Bikash Vidyapith is a Bengali-medium coeducational institution established in 1994. It has facilities for teaching from class I to class VIII.

Kalyanesari High School is a Bengali-medium coeducational institution established in 1968. It has facilities for teaching from class V to class X.

== Healthcare ==
The 50-bed Salanpur Hospital of Eastern Coalfields is located at Dendua.

Medical facilities (dispensaries) in the Salanpur Area of ECL are available at Salanpur Area (PO Lalganj), Mohanpur Colliery (PO Lalganj), Burmundia Colliery (PO Kanyapur), Gourandi Colliery (PO Panuria), Dabar Colliery (PO Samdi), Banjamehari Colliery (PO Salanpur), RH Dendua (PO Salanpur).
