= Panuria =

- Census Town
- Location in West Bengal, India Panuria (India)
- Coordinates: 23.822889°N 86.983944°E
- Country: India
- State: West Bengal
- District: Paschim Bardhaman

Area
  - Total: 5.2071 km^{2} (2.0105 sq mi)

Population (2011)
  - Total: 8,399
  - Density: 1,613/km^{2} (4,178/sq mi)

Languages*
  - Official: Bengali, Hindi, English
- Time zone: UTC+5:30 (IST)
- PIN: 713315
- Telephone code: 0341
- Vehicle registration: WB
- Lok Sabha constituency: Asansol
- Vidhan Sabha constituency: Barabani
- Website: paschimbardhaman.co.in

Panuria is a census town in the Barabani CD block in the Asansol Sadar subdivision of the Paschim Bardhaman district in the Indian state of West Bengal.

== Geography ==
Cities, towns and ECL Areas in the western portion of Asansol Sadar subdivision in Paschim Bardhaman district
MC: municipal corporation, P: rural administrative centre, CT: census town, N: neighbourhood, OG: out growth, T: temple
Owing to space constraints in the small map, the actual locations in a larger map may vary slightly

=== Location ===
Panuria is located at 23.822889°N 86.983944°E.

=== Urbanisation ===
As per the 2011 census, 83.33% of the population of Asansol Sadar subdivision was urban and 16.67% was rural. In 2015, the municipal areas of Kulti, Raniganj and Jamuria were included within the jurisdiction of Asansol Municipal Corporation. Asansol Sadar subdivision has 26 (+1 partly) Census Towns.(partly presented in the map alongside; all places marked on the map are linked in the full-screen map).

== Demographics ==
According to the 2011 Census of India, Panuria had a total population of 8,399 of which 4,236 (50%) were males and 4,163 (50%) were females. Population in the age group 0– 6 years was 1,139. The total number of literate persons in Panuria was 5,309 (73.13% of the population over 6 years).

*For language details see Barabani (community development block)#Language and religion

== Infrastructure ==
According to the District Census Handbook 2011, Bardhaman, Panuria covered an area of 5.2071 km^{2}. Among the civic amenities, it had 6 km roads with open drains, the protected water supply involved service reservoir, tap water from treated sources, hand pumps, borewell/ tubewell. It had 1,200 domestic electric connections and 10 road lighting (points). Among the medical facilities it had 1 hospital, 10 medicine shops. Among the educational facilities it had were 19 primary schools, 1 middle school, 1 secondary school, 1 senior secondary school, the nearest general degree college at Asansol 17 km away. Among the social cultural and recreational facilities, it had 1 auditorium/ community hall, 1 public library. Among the important commodities it produced were stone chips, fire-bricks, coal briquettes. It had the branch offices of 2 nationalised banks.

== Economy ==
As per ECL website telephone numbers, operational collieries in the Salanpur Area of Eastern Coalfields in 2018 are: Bonjemehari Colliery, Barmondia Colliery, Dabor Colliery, Gourandi Colliery, Gourandi Begunia Colliery and Mohonpur OCP.

== Transport ==
Panuria is off Runakara Ghat Road.

== Education ==
Gourangdi RKS Institution is a Bengali-medium coeducational institution established in 1945. It has facilities for teaching from class V to Class XII. The school 5 computers, a library with 600 books and a playground.

Jamgram Anchalik High School is a Bengali-medium coeducational institution established in 1995. It has facilities for teaching from class V to class XII. The school has 3 computers, a library with 150 books and a playground.

Madrasa Raza-E-Mustafa Jameul Olum is an Urdu-medium Madrasa in Panuria, Panuria Hattota Urdu Free Primary School is an Urdu-medium primary school, Gourangdi C SSK is a Hindi-medium primary school. There are several Bengali-medium primary schools in the area: Kantapahari Free Primary School, Panuria ALFP School, Panuria Hattala SSK, Panuria Ruidaspara SSK and other schools.

== Healthcare ==
There is a primary health centre at Panuria, with 6 beds.

Medical facilities (dispensaries) in the Salanpur Area of ECL are available at Salanpur Area (PO Lalganj), Mohanpur Colliery (PO Lalganj), Burmundia Colliery (PO Kanyapur), Gourandi Colliery (PO Panuria), Dabar Colliery (PO Samdi), Banjamehari Colliery (PO Salanpur), RH Dendua (PO Salanpur).
