= Kunustoria Area =

Mining area in West Bengal, India

- Location in West Bengal Kunustoria Area (India)
- Location: 23.645711°N 87.117422°E
- Products: Non-coking coal
- Company: Eastern Coalfields Limited
- Website: http://www.easterncoal.gov.in/

Kunustoria Area is one of the 14 operational areas of Eastern Coalfields Limited located in Asansol subdivision of Paschim Bardhaman district in the state of West Bengal, India.

== Geography ==
Collieries in the Kunustoria Area of Eastern Coalfields
U: Underground Colliery, O: Open Cast Colliery, S: Mining support, A: Administrative headquarters
Owing to space constraints in the small map, the actual locations in a larger map may vary slightly

=== Location ===
The Kunustoria Area is located around 23.645711°N 87.117422°E

The Kunustoria Area is bounded by the rural areas of Jamuria CD Block on the north, Kenda Area and Kajora Area on the east, Bankura district, across the Damodar on the south, and Satgram Area and Sripur Area on the west.

The map alongside shows some of the collieries in the Area. However, as the collieries do not have individual pages, there are no links in the full screen map.

=== Coal ===
As per the Shodhganga website, collieries in the Kunustoria Area of Eastern Coalfields are: Amritnagar, Amrasota, Mahabir, North Searsole, Kunustoria, Banshra, Topsi, Belbaid, Parasea 6&7, Parasea, Banshra OCP, Parasea OCP and Narayankuri OCP.

As per ECL website telephone numbers, operational collieries in the Kunustoria Area in 2018 are:Amritnagar Colliery, Amrasota Colliery, Bansra Colliery, Belbaid Colliery, Kunustoria Colliery, Mahabir OCP, North Searsole Colliery, Parasea Colliery, Parasea 6 & 7 Incline and Parasea OCP.

See also – Kajora Area#Mining plan – it includes a major portion of Kunustoria Area
See also – Satgram Area#Mining plan for Amritnagar and Mahabir collieries

Operational Areas of ECL (Source:ENVIS Centre on Environmental Problems of Mining)

== Subsidence ==
Traditionally many underground collieries have left a void after taking out the coal. As a result, almost all areas are facing subsidence. As per CMPDIL, there were 11 points of subsidence in the Kunustoria Area involving 399.21 hectares of land.

== Mahabir Colliery rescue operations ==
In 1989, Mahabir underground colliery was working in Narainkuri seam through A and B shafts, about 86 m. The overlying Ningah seam (parting 22 m) had been worked and abandoned a long time back. It was full of water. "On 13.11.1989 at about 4 a.m., a heading in Narainkuri seam punctured into an abandoned shaft (Pit No.34, which was not shown on the plan of Narainkuri seam) through which water of Ningah seam started rushing into Narainkuri seam. Heavy flow was reported for about 45 minutes. There were 232 persons employed below ground in the night shift of whom 161, working in the vicinity of the shafts, could come out. 71 could not reach the shafts as the roadways leading to the shafts had got flooded. In a short time, both the shafts got flooded up to a height of 12 m above the pit-bottom. Fortunately, there was a telephone connection between the underground workings (where the miners were trapped) and the surface and it was learnt over this telephone that 65 miners had taken shelter in the rise part of the workings. Thus 6 miners could not be accounted for."

Initially, pumping was resorted to but it did not prove to be an immediate success because much of the water was flowing back into the mine through surface cracks. At a later stage more fool proof pumping arrangements were made. Two exploration bore holes had been drilled in the past. One of the bore holes was activated with further boring and in about 24 hours from the time of flooding, torches, food, drinking water, medicines, etc. were lowered through this bore hole. A second bore hole of 200 mm (8") was bored and then widened in stages to 21.5" diameter. The top 11 m alluvium portion was further enlarged and lined with steel ducting to prevent it from caving in.

Cities and towns in the eastern portion of Asansol Sadar subdivision in Paschim Bardhaman district
MC: Municipal Corporation, CT: census town, N: neighbourhood, R: rural centre
Owing to space constraints in the small map, the actual locations in a larger map may vary slightly

While drilling was going on, a steel capsule of 17" inside diameter and 2.5 m height had been fabricated. On 16.11.1989, after a few trial runs, Jaswant Singh Gill, Addl Chief Mining Engineer, risked his own life, and went down the bore hole in the capsule. The rescue operations started and the 65 trapped miners started coming up in the capsule, one-by-one. It took about 6 hours to complete the evacuation and the last person to come up was Jaswant Singh Gill.

"Over 20,000 people had assembled to witness the tension-charged rescue operation... when Shri Gill emerged from the capsule, people went mad with emotional outburst. They lifted him on their shoulders and heaped him with garlands. The scene cannot be described in words; it is best left to the imagination of the reader to re-create it in his own mind, and thus ended a glorious chapter in the history of Indian mining."

"Jaswant Singh Gill was honoured with India's highest civilian gallantry award Sarvottam Jeevan Raksha Padak (SJRP) for saving the lives of 65 miners, by the President of India. Before Shri Gill, no living person had been honoured with this gallantry award. However, many people have received it posthumously. His historic act of bravery on November 16 is celebrated by Coal India Ltd as ‘Rescue Day’." Gill retired from Coal India as an Executive Director in 1998 and settled in Amritsar. ‘The Hero of Raniganj’ is still remembered by many people in many ways.

== Migrants ==
Prior to the advent of coal mining, the entire region was a low-productive rice crop area in what was once a part of the Jungle Mahals. The ownership of land had passed on from local adivasis to agricultural castes before mining started. However, the Santhals and the Bauris, referred to by the colonial administrators as "traditional coal cutters of Raniganj" remained attached to their lost land and left the mines for agricultural related work, which also was more remunerative. It forced the mine-owners to bring in outside labour, mostly from Bihar, Odisha and Uttar Pradesh. In time the migrants dominated the mining and industrial scenario. The pauperization and alienation of the adivasis have been major points of social concern.

== Transport ==
The Andal-Jamuria-Sitarampur branch line passes through the Kunustoria Area.

NH 19 (old number NH 2) and NH 14 (old number NH 60) pass through the Kunustoria Area.

== Healthcare ==
Bansra Hospital of ECL functions with 50 beds.

== See also ==
- Mission Raniganj
