= Raniganj Coalfield =

Coal field in West Bengal, India

- Location in West Bengal
- Location: West Bengal, India; 23°37′44″N 87°06′54″E
- Opened: 1774
- Company: Eastern Coalfields Limited
- Website: http://www.easterncoal.gov.in/
- Acquired: 1975

Raniganj Coalfield is primarily located in the Asansol and Durgapur subdivisions of Paschim Bardhaman district of West Bengal, India. It spreads over to the neighboring districts of Birbhum, Bankura, Purulia and to Dhanbad district of Jharkhand. Both, Non-coking and coking coal are found here.

== History ==
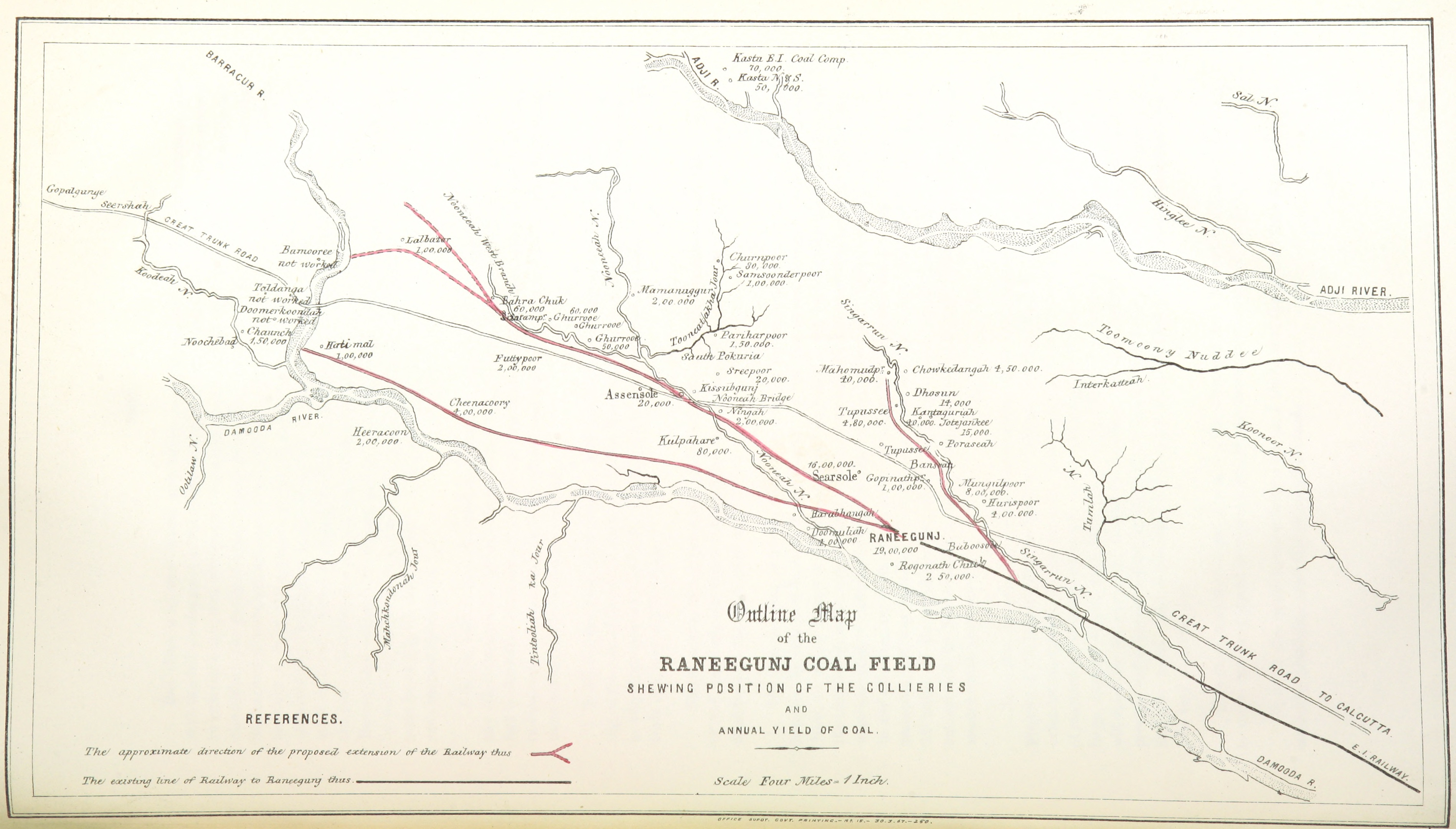
Raniganj Coalfield in 1867

Coalmining in India first started in the Raniganj Coalfield. In 1774, John Sumner and Suetonius Grant Heatly of the British East India Company found coal near Ethora, presently in Salanpur community development block. The early exploration and mining operations were carried out in a haphazard manner.

Regular mining started in 1820, led by an agency house, Alexander & Co. In 1835, Prince Dwarkanath Tagore bought over the collieries and Carr, Tagore and Company led the field. For the entire 19th century and a major part of the 20th century, Raniganj coalfields was the major producer of coal in the country.

At the behest of William Princep, Carr, Tagore and Company joined hands with Gilmore Hombray and Co. in 1843 to form Bengal Coal Company, which opened up coal mining activities. Their headquarters was at Sanctoria. Other mining companies included Birbhum Coal Co., Equitable Coal Co., Madhu Roy and Prasanna Dutta Co., Bird and Co., South Barakar Coal Co., Andrew Yule and Company Ltd. and Balmer Lawrie.

In 1886, W.W.Hunter wrote, "Raniganj Coalfield has been estimated at an area of 500 square miles. In this ‘black country of India’, which is dotted with tall chimney stalks, many European companies are at work, besides many native firms. At first coal was raised from open workings; but regular mining is now carried on, according to the system known as ‘pillar and stall’... The miners are all drawn from the aboriginal races, chiefly Santals and Bauris, who are noted for their endurance and docility."

== 2008 status ==
All non-coking coal mines were nationalized in 1973 and placed under Coal Mines Authority of India. In 1975, Eastern Coalfields Limited, a subsidiary of Coal India Limited, was formed. It took over all the earlier private collieries in Raniganj Coalfield.

Raniganj Coalfield covers an area of 443.50 km^{2} (171.24 sq mi) and has total coal reserves of 49.17 billion tonnes, spread across Indian states of West Bengal and Jharkhand. That makes it the second largest coalfield in the country (in terms of reserves). Out of the total reserve, 30.61 billion tonnes is in the West Bengal and 18.56 billion tonnes is in Jharkhand.

== Coal seams ==
In the Raniganj Coalfield the coal seams can be divided into two blocks – Raniganj measures and Barakar measures. The following areas of ECL are covered by the Raniganj measures: Raniganj-Pandaveswar, Kajora, Jhanjra, Bankola, Kenda, Sonepur, Kunustoria, Satgram, Sripur, Sodepur and Salanpur (partly). Barakar measures cover two areas of ECL: Salanpur and Mugma.

ONGC’s preliminary assessment of coal-bed methane indicates that four Damodar Valley coalfields – Jharia, Bokaro, North Karanpura and Raniganj – to be the most prospective.

== Key 2013 figures ==
The following are the highlights for fiscal year 2012-13

- Coal production = 33.90 million tonnes
- Annual turnover = ₹12,076.17 crore (US$1.3 billion)
- Profit before tax = ₹1,897.18 crore (US$200 million)
- Manpower = 72,973
- Number of operating mines = 98
  - Underground = 77
  - Open-pit = 21

== Operating areas ==
A broad area-wise distribution of coalmines of Eastern Coalfield Limited is given below:

Area	Collieries
Bankola	Bankola Colliery, Khandra Colliery, Kumardih A Colliery, Kumardih B Colliery, Moira Colliery, Nakrakonda Colliery, Shankarpur Colliery, Shyamsundarpur Colliery, Tilaboni Colliery
Jhanjra	Main Industrial Complex (MIC), I & II Incline, I & B Incline, 3 & 4 Incline
Kajora	Central Kajora Colliery, Jambad OCP, Jambad UG, Khas Kajora Colliery, Lachipur Colliery, Madhusudanpur Colliery, Madhabpur Colliery, Naba Kajora Colliery, Porascole Colliery
Kenda	Bahula Colliery, Chora Block Incline, CL Jambad Colliery, Chora OCP, Haripur Colliery, Lower Kenda Colliery, New Kenda Colliery, Siduli Colliery, SK OCP, West Kenda OCP
Kunustoria	Amritnagar Colliery, Amrasota Colliery, Bansra Colliery, Belbaid Colliery, Kunustoria Colliery, Mahabir OCP, N. Searsole Colliery, Parasea Colliery, Parasea 6 & 7 Incline, Parasea OCP, Narayankuri OCP
Mugma	Badjna Colliery, Bermury OCP, Chapapur Colliery, Gopinathpur Colliery, Hariajam Colliery, Kumardhubi Colliery, Khoodia Colliery, Kapasara Colliery, Lakhimata Colliery, Mandman Colliery, Rajpura OCP, Shampur B
Pandaveswar	Dalurband Colliery, Khottadih OCP, Khottadih UG, Mandhaipur Colliery, Manderbony Colliery, Pandaveswar Colliery, South Samla Colliery
Rajmahal	Lalmatia Coalfield in Godda, Jharkhand
Salanpur	Bonjemehari Colliery, Barmondia Colliery, Dabor, Gourandi Colliery, Gourandi Begunia Colliery, Mohonpur OCP
Satgram	Chapui Khas Colliery, JK Nagar Project, Jemehari Colliery, Kalidaspur Project, Kuardi Colliery, Nimcha Colliery, Pure Searsole Colliery, Ratibati Colliery, Satgram Project, Satgram Incline
Sodepur	Bejdih Colliery, Chinakuri 1 & 2 Colliery, Chinakuri 3 Colliery, Dhemomain Incline, Dhemomain Pit, Dubeswary Colliery, Methani Colliery, Mouthdih Colliery, Narsamuda Colliery, Parbelia Colliery, Patmohona Colliery, Sodepur Colliery
Sonpur Bazari	Sonpur Bazari Project
S.P.Mines	Chitra in Deoghar, Jharkhand
Sripur	Bhanora West Block Colliery, New Ghusick Colliery, Kalipahari Colliery, Ningha Colliery, S.S.I. Colliery,

Note: All the linked Area pages provide relevant details of the collieries and carry maps indicating the location of the collieries. All the operational areas are in Raniganj Coalfield, except Rajmahal and S.P. Mines.

== See also ==
- Deocha Pachami coal block
- Kunustoria Area#Mahabir Colliery rescue operations (Basis for Mission Raniganj)
