= Bardhaman–Asansol section =

Railway route in West Bengal, India

Barddhaman–Asansol section

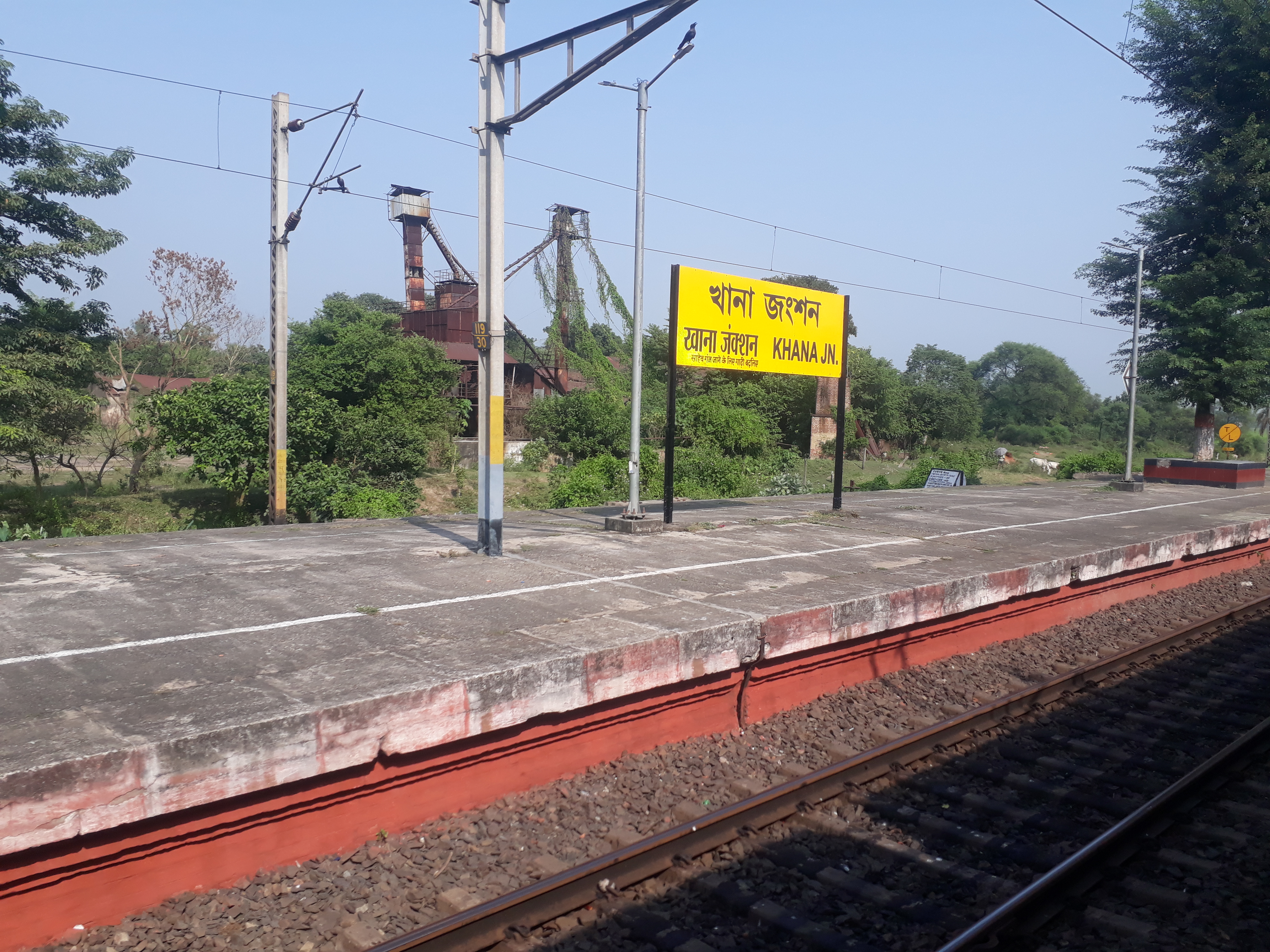
- Khana Junction is an important railway station on Bardhaman–Asansol section

Overview
- Status: Operational
- Owner: Indian Railways
- Locale: West Bengal
- Termini: Bardhaman; Asansol
- Stations: 16

Service
- System: Electrified
- Operator(s): Eastern Railway

History
- Opened: 1855–1863

Technical
- Line length: 106 km (66 mi)
- Number of tracks: 4 (2 up and 2 dn)
- Track gauge: 5 ft 6 in (1,676 mm) broad gauge
- Electrification: 25 kV AC overhead in 1960−66
- Operating speed: up to 130 kmph (80 mph)

The Barddhaman–Asansol section is a railway line connecting Bardhaman and Asansol. This 106 kilometres (66 mi) track is part of the Howrah–Delhi main line, Howrah–Gaya–Delhi line and Howrah–Allahabad–Mumbai line. It is under the jurisdiction of Eastern Railway, and is connected to the South Eastern Railway through Asansol–Adra line at Asansol Jn and Kalipahari–Damodar connector at Kalipahari (this line is only used by freight trains).

== History ==
=== Beginning of railways in Eastern India ===
The Howrah–Delhi railway line was planned via Rajmahal, using the level plains on the banks of the Ganges. During the middle of the nineteenth century coal mining had started in the Raniganj Coalfield. The coal was being mined by Carr, Tagore and Company owned primarily by Prince Dwarakanath Tagore, and was transported in boats and barges on the Damodar River from Narayankuri ghat. The fluctuating levels of water in the Damodar was an impediment for the smooth transportation of coal.

Amongst the Indian merchants, in Mumbai and Kolkata, who took an active interest in the development of the railways, the most prominent name was that of Dwarakanath. M/s Carr, Tagore and Company is reported to have offered in 1844, to raise some capital for the construction of a railway line beyond Bardhaman to the Raniganj Coalfield. However, after Dwarakanath's premature death the conception, promotion and launching of India's railways were all British. After the first run of a train in Eastern India from Howrah to Hooghly in 1854, East Indian Railway Company extended the tracks to Raniganj, beyond the plans of the route to Delhi, and on 1 February 1855, the first train ran from Hooghly to Raniganj. The railways were extended to Asansol in July 1863.

Bengal Nagpur Railway extended its tracks to the Asansol coal belt in 1887, thus connecting Asansol with Adra, 37 kilometres (23 mi) away. What was then the BNR mainline from Nagpur to Asansol was opened for goods traffic in 1891.

=== The "main line" ===
The first rail track between Howrah and Delhi was via what was later named as Sahibganj loop and the first train on the route was run in 1864. A "shorter main line" connecting Raniganj and Kiul Junction was in position in 1871 and the opening of the Grand Chord in 1907 shortened the distance from Howrah to Delhi even further.

The Andal–Sainthia branch line was built in 1913. The 73 kilometres (45 mi) branch line linked the north-eastern part of Raniganj coalfield and the western part of Birbhum district to the main railway tracks.

=== MEMU service ===
The first MEMU service on the Bardhaman–Asansol section was started on 11 July 1994.

== Electrification ==
The Bardhaman–Mankar sector was electrified in 1964–65, the Mankar–Waria sector in 1965–66 and the Waria–Asansol sector in 1960−61.

== Loco sheds ==
There are diesel loco sheds at Bardhaman and Andal. Bardhaman diesel loco shed has WDG-3A, WDM-6, WDM-2 and WDM-3A locos. EMUs are also parked here. Andal diesel loco shed has WDS-6, WDM-2, WDM-3A and WDG-3A locos. Asansol had the oldest electric loco shed of Indian Railways. It presently has WAG-5 and WAM-4 locos.

== Andal Yard ==
The Andal Yard is the largest goods yard in the Asansol Division of Eastern Railway. Wagons are marshaled in the yard with the assistance of a hump fitted with mechanical retarders. Located in the Raniganj Coalfield, the yard handles about 1,300 coal wagons daily and another 4,400 wagons with other materials. Apart from coal, it handles steel, petroleum products and a large parcel traffic.

== Speed limits ==
Most of the Bardhaman–Asansol section is classified as 'A' class line where trains can run up to 160 km per hour but in certain sections speeds may be limited to 120–130 km per hour. The Howrah Rajdhani (between Howrah and New Delhi) travels at an average speed of 85.8 km per hour and the Sealdah Rajdhani (between Sealdah and New Delhi) travels at an average speed of 84.70 km per hour.

== Busy section ==
It is one of the busiest sections of Indian Railways with Asansol handling over 50 trains in a day.

== Railway reorganisation ==
In 1952, Eastern Railway, Northern Railway and North Eastern Railway were formed. Eastern Railway was formed with a portion of East Indian Railway Company, east of Mughalsarai and Bengal Nagpur Railway. Northern Railway was formed with a portion of East Indian Railway Company west of Mughalsarai, Jodhpur Railway, Bikaner Railway and Eastern Punjab Railway. North Eastern Railway was formed with Oudh and Tirhut Railway, Assam Railway and a portion of Bombay, Baroda and Central India Railway. East Central Railway was created in 1996–97.
