= Sripur Area =

Coal producing area in India

- Location in West Bengal Sripur Area (India)
- Location: 23.684889°N 87.047754°E
- Company: Eastern Coalfields Limited
- Website: http://www.easterncoal.gov.in/

Sripur Area is one of the 14 operational areas of Eastern Coalfields Limited located in Asansol subdivision of Paschim Bardhaman district in the state of West Bengal, India.

== Geography ==
Collieries in Sripur and Satgram Areas of Eastern Coalfields
U: Underground Colliery, O: Open Cast Colliery, S: Mining support, A: Administrative headquarters
Owing to space constraints in the small map, the actual locations in a larger map may vary slightly

=== Location ===
Sripur Area is located around 23.684889°N 87.047754°E

The Sripur Area is bounded by the rural areas Jamuria CD Block on the north, Pandaveswar Area on the east, Satgram Area on the south, and neighbourhoods of Asansol and Barabani CD Block/Salanpur Area on the west.

The map alongside shows some of the collieries in the Areas. However, as the collieries do not have individual pages, there are no links in the full screen map.

=== Collieries ===
As per the Shodhganga website, collieries in the Sripur Area are: Ghusick, Nigah, S.S.Incline, Jamuria, Sripur, K.D.Incline, Adjoy II, Bhanora, Kalipahari and Damra.

As per ECL website telephone numbers, operational collieries in the Sripur Area in 2018 are: Bhanora West Block Colliery, Girmint Colliery, New Ghusick Colliery, Kalipahari Colliery, Ningha Colliery and S.S.I. Colliery.

== Mines cluster ==
Cluster No. 8 is in the west-central portion of Raniganj Coalfield and spans over four geological blocks, namely Sripur, Satgram, Ningha and Bhanora. The mines are under the administrative control of Sripur and Satgram Areas of ECL. As of 2015–16, the composition of the cluster is as follows:

1. Bhanora underground mine, with normative annual production capacity of 0.2 million tonnes and peak annual production capacity of 0.3 mt, had an expected life of over 20 years.
2. Girmint/ KDI UG mine, with normative annual production capacity of 0.04 mt and peak annual production capacity of 0.65 mt, had an expected life of over 50 years.
3. Sripur UG mine, with normative annual production capacity of 0.014 mt and peak annual production capacity of 0.024 mt, had an expected life of over 20 years.
4. Sripur Seam Incline UG mine, with normative annual production capacity of 0.105 mt and peak annual production capacity of 0.136 mt, had an expected life of over 25 years.
5. Ningha UG mine, with normative annual production capacity of 0.040 mt and peak annual production capacity of 0.100 mt, had an expected life of over 50 years.
6. Mithapur West UG mine and open cast patch, with normative annual production capacity of 0.28 mt and peak annual production capacity of 0.342 mt, had an expected life of over 50 years.
7. Satgram UG mine, with normative production capacity of 0.85 mt and peak annual production capacity of 1.200 mt, had an expected life of over 30 years.
As of 2015–16, there was no production from Bhanora UG mine, Girmint/KDI UG mine and Sripur UG mine. In Sripur Seam Incline UG mine, Rana (R-V) seam was being worked manually. In Ningha UG mine, Dishergarh (R-IV) seam was being worked by board and pillar method. There was no production from Mithapur West UG mine and OC patch. In Satgram UG mine, R-IV and R-III seams were being worked.

See also – Salanpur Area#Mining plan for Bhanora West UG mine and Bhanora West OC patch
See also – Satgram Area#Mining plan for Ghusick, New Ghusick and Kalipahari collieries

Operational Areas of ECL (Source:ENVIS Centre on Environmental Problems of Mining)

== Illegal coal mining ==
India is the third largest coal producer in the world. Mining is a highly organized industry, but there are gaps and loopholes. Beyond, or rather underneath, the well-organised industry, there is a large sector described as illegal mining. According to Haradhan Roy, the veteran political leader and trade unionist, about a million tonnes of coal are produced by illegal collieries in Raniganj alone. The total annual national production from such mines in India is not less than 20 million tonnes. In 2001 there were at least 33 identified sites of unauthorized mining in Raniganj. Of these many were in Salanpur, Sripur, Satgram and Sodepur Areas. Seven are outside ECL's lease-hold land. However, apart from the identified areas, such activities are spread across the entire region.

Systematic mining and movement of coal by the railways, started in the mid-nineteenth century in the Raniganj Coalfields, led by Carr, Tagore and Company. The conventional "board and pillar" system was used in Indian underground collieries. In this system coal pillars are left behind to support the roof and the vacant space was not always filled with sand. ECL leaves a mine as soon as it is ‘uneconomic’, leaving the remaining coal for others to scavenge upon. There are around 1,380 abandoned pits and inclines of ECL in the region. The veteran CITU leader, Sunil Basu Roy, described the workers of the illegal mines as "the wretched on the earth" – they have nowhere else to go and no other means of survival. In Gourandi village, near Asansol, around 5,000 people work in shifts in an open cast mine. Work in such mines are labour-intensive and machines are unknown. The poor who rush into such jobs come from all segments of society, the Adivasi and other locals and migrants. They are quite often in the news when accidents occur.

Cities and towns in the eastern portion of Asansol Sadar subdivision in Paschim Bardhaman district
MC: Municipal Corporation, CT: census town, N: neighbourhood, R: rural centre
Owing to space constraints in the small map, the actual locations in a larger map may vary slightly

== Subsidence ==
Traditionally many underground collieries left a void after taking out the coal. As a result, almost all areas are facing subsidence. The entire stretch of Grand Trunk Road from Andal to Barakar passes through a subsidence-prone area. As per CMPDIL, there were 8 points of subsidence in the Sripur Area involving 1,046.92 hectares of land.

== Accident ==
Amongst the major accidents in Indian coal mines in the post-independence period, only one has occurred in what is now the Sripur Area, On 14 March 1954, 10 persons were killed in an explosion of fire damp at Damra Colliery, then owned by Kalipahari Coal Company.

== Migrants ==
Prior to the advent of coal mining, the entire region was a low-productive rice crop area in what was once a part of the Jungle Mahals. The ownership of land had passed on from local adivasis to agricultural castes before mining started. However, the Santhals and the Bauris, referred to by the colonial administrators as "traditional coal cutters of Raniganj" remained attached to their lost land and left the mines for agricultural related work, which also was more remunerative. It forced the mine-owners to bring in outside labour, mostly from Bihar, Odisha and Uttar Pradesh. In time the migrants dominated the mining and industrial scenario. The pauperization and alienation of the adivasis has been a major point of social concern.

== Transport ==
The Andal–Jamuria–Sitarampur branch line passes through the Sripur Area.
