= Rupnarayanpur =

Rupnarayanpur Hindustan Cables Township
- Census Town
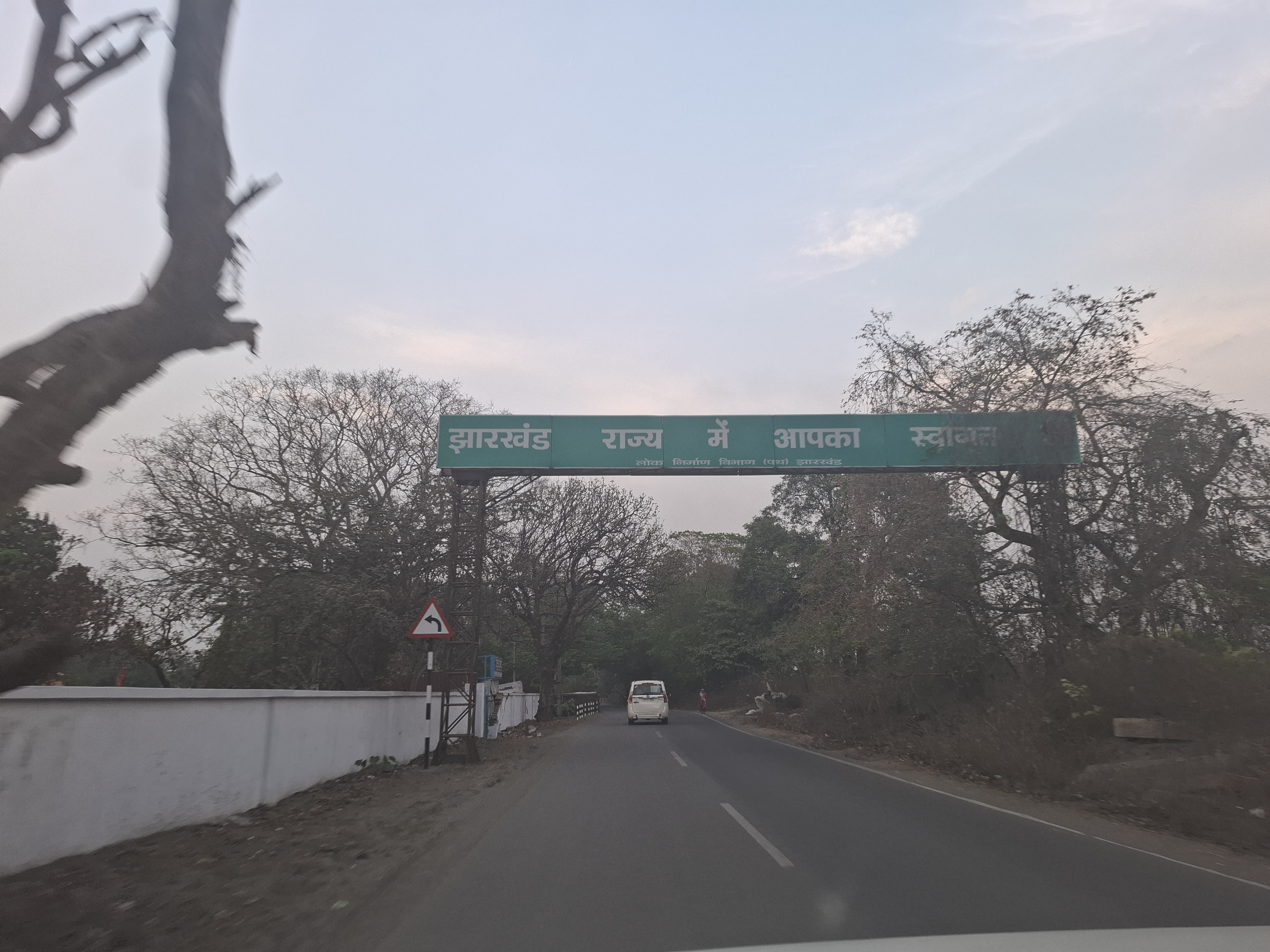
- Rupnarayanpur Border check post

- Location in West Bengal, India Rupnarayanpur (India)
- Coordinates: 23.82°N 86.90°E
- Country: India
- State: West Bengal
- District: Paschim Bardhaman
- Elevation: 153 m (502 ft)

Population (2011)
  - Total: 2,242 (Rupnarayanpur); 22,599 (Hindustan Cables Township)

Languages*
  - Official: Bengali, Hindi, English,
- Time zone: UTC+5:30 (IST)
- PIN: 713386
- Vehicle registration: WB
- Lok Sabha constituency: Asansol
- Vidhan Sabha constituency: Barabani
- Website: paschimbardhaman.co.in

Rupnarayanpur, Rupnarainpur or Hindustan Cables Township, is a census town in the Salanpur CD block in the Asansol Sadar subdivision of the Paschim Bardhaman district in the Indian state of West Bengal.

== Civic administration ==
=== CD block HQ ===
The headquarters of Salanpur CD block are located at Rupnarayanpur.

== Demographics ==
According to the 2011 Census of India Hindustan Cables Township had a total population of 22,599 of which 11,555 (51%) were males and 11,044 (49%) were females. Population in the age group 0–6 years was 1,863. The total number of literates in Hindutan Cables Township was 18,177 (87.66% of the population over 6 years).

=== Languages ===
Languages spoken in Hindustan cable Township (2011)
1. Bengali 71.22 (69.1%)
2. Hindi 17.58 (17.0%)
3. Santali 8.23 (7.98%)
4. Bhojpuri 1.25 (1.21%)
5. Nepali 0.69 (0.67%)
6. Punjabi 0.66 (0.64%)
7. Others 3.5 (3.39%)

As per 2011 Census of India Rupnarayanpur (census village) had a total population of 2,242 of which 1,156 (52%) were males and 1,086 (48%) were females. Population below 6 years was 179. The total number of literates in Rupnarayanpur was 1,791 (86.82% of the population over 6 years).

As of 2001 India census, Hindusthan Cables Town had a population of 76,450. Males constitute 52% of the population and females 48%. Hindusthan Cables Town has an average literacy rate of 79%, higher than the national average of 59.5%: male literacy is 84%, and female literacy is 74%. In Hindusthan Cables Town, 10% of the population is under 6 years of age.

== Geography ==
Cities, towns and ECL Areas in the western portion of Asansol Sadar subdivision in Paschim Bardhaman district
MC: municipal corporation, P: rural administrative centre, CT: census town, N: neighbourhood, OG: out growth, T: temple
Owing to space constraints in the small map, the actual locations in a larger map may vary slightly

=== Location ===
Rupnarayanpur is located at 23.82°N 86.90°E. It has an average elevation of 153 m (502 ft).

=== Urbanisation ===
As per the 2011 census, 83.33% of the population of Asansol Sadar subdivision was urban and 16.67% was rural. In 2015, the municipal areas of Kulti, Raniganj and Jamuria were included within the jurisdiction of Asansol Municipal Corporation. Asansol Sadar subdivision has 26 (+1 partly) Census Towns.(partly presented in the map alongside; all places marked on the map are linked in the full-screen map).

== History ==
The first production unit of Hindustan Cables was set up in 1952 in Rupnarayanpur, in technical collaboration with Standard Telephones and Cables Ltd.for production of paper insulated dry core cables. In 2007 updated and expanded Rupnarainpur unit, with an installed capacity of 63 LCKM, manufactures polythene-insulated jelly-filled cables and aerial cables. Facilities for manufacturing 1 million pairs of telephone coiled cords and 1.5 million pieces of computer cords have been set up in the unit. The telephone cords (2-way ovular straight and 4-way ovular extensible etc.) conform to the latest specification and cater to the Indian market and the computer cords for Computer Industries. Bihar Pottery has a refractory unit at Rupnarayanpur but the refractory industry in the region is facing an uncertain future.

== Infrastructure ==
According to the District Census Handbook 2011, Bardhaman, Rupnarayanpur (Hindustan Cables Town) covered an area of 3.9 km^{2}. Among the civic amenities, it had 26 km roads with open drains, a protected water supply involved over-head tank, tap water from treated sources, borewell/ tubewell. It had 1,800 domestic electric connections and 350 road lighting (points). Among the medical facilities it had 1 dispensary/health centre, 5 medicine shops. Among the educational facilities it had 8 primary schools, 3 secondary schools, 2 senior secondary schools, the nearest general degree college at Chittaranjan 1 km away. It had 1 polytechnic. Among the social, cultural, and recreational facilities, it had 1 stadium, 1 cinema theatre, 4 auditorium/ community halls. It had the branch offices of 3 nationalised banks and 1 non-agricultural credit society.

== Education ==
Hindustan Cables Town has eight primary, one secondary and two higher secondary schools.

Schools include D.A.V Public School Hindustan Cables, Rupnarayanpur, Sishuniketan School and Sishu Bikas School.

== Healthcare ==
Pithaikeary Rural Hospital, with 30 beds, at Rupnarayanpur, is the major government medical facility in the Salanpur CD block. There are primary health centres at Dabor, PO Achra (with 10 beds), and Parbotpur, PO Samdi (with 2 beds).

== Sports ==
Rupnarayanpur has many prominent sports persons such as Swapan Paul (Footballer). Koushik Das Chowdhury (Sprinter).
