= Eastern Coalfields =

Indian coal producer

Eastern Coalfields Limited (ECL)
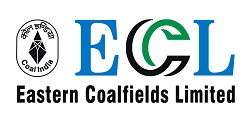
- Type: Public sector undertakings(PSU)
- Industry: Mining
- Headquarters: Sanctoria, Asansol, West Bengal, India
- Area served: WEST BENGAL
- Key people: Shri SATISH JHA (Chairman & CMD)
- Products: Coal
- Revenue: ▲₹15,090.54 crore (US$1.6 billion)(FY25)
- Net income: ▲₹15,750.90 crore (US$1.6 billion) (FY25)
- Total assets: ▲₹18,876.54 crore (US$2.0 billion) (FY25)
- Owner: Coal India Limited
- Number of employees: 46996
- Website: easterncoal.nic.in

Eastern Coalfields Limited (ECL) is a coal producer based in India. The company was founded in 1975 after nationalisation of coal mines in India. It operates coal mines in Jharkhand and West Bengal states of India. It inherited all the private sector coal mines of the Raniganj Coalfield. It is one of the fully owned subsidiaries of Coal India Limited, the state-owned coal producer. The company has its headquarters at Sanctoria, in West Bengal.

== Backdrop ==
Coal mining in India first started in the Raniganj Coalfield. In 1774, John Sumner and Suetonius Grant Heatly of the British East India Company found coal near Ethora, presently in Salanpur community development block. The early exploration and mining operations were carried out in a haphazard manner.

Regular mining started in 1820, led by an agency house, Alexander & Co. In 1835, Prince Dwarkanath Tagore bought over the collieries and Carr, Tagore and Company led the field. For the entire 19th century and a major part of the 20th century, Ranigunj coalfields was the major producer of coal in the country.

At the behest of William Princep, Carr, Tagore and Company joined hands with Gilmore Homfray and Co. in 1843 to form Bengal Coal Co., which opened up coal mining activities. Their headquarters was at Sanctoria.

Nationalisation of the coal industry was in stages. The management of coking coal mines was taken over in 1971 and the coking coal mines were nationalised in 1972. The management of non-coking coal mines was taken over on 31 January 1973 and these were nationalised on 1 May 1973. Coal India Limited, a holding company, was formed in 1975, encompassing the entire coal industry. In 2016–17, CIL produced 554.14 million tonnes of coal. It is the single-largest coal producer in the world. Eastern Coalfields Ltd. is one of the 7 wholly owned producing subsidiaries of CIL

At the time of nationalisation, 414 coal mines, almost wholly in the Raniganj Coalfield, came under the jurisdiction of ECL. The mines were regrouped to around 123 mines. Production from these mines in 1973–74 was 21 million tonnes, of which 20.744 million tonnes were from underground mines and the rest from manual quarries. The percentage of production from the underground mines has declined from 98.49% at the time of nationalisation to 18.23% in 2014–15. The focus is on technological upgradation of underground mines. In 2014–15, the technology-wise production from the underground mines (in million tonnes) was: conventional bord and pillar – 0.539, mechanised bord and pillar – 5.335, mechanised longwall (including road header) – 0.025, continuous miner – 1.397, Total – 7.296.

== Geography ==
ECL mining leasehold area is 753.75 km^{2} and surface right area is 237.18 km^{2}It is spread across West Bengal and Jharkhand. ECL operates in Raniganj Coalfield in West Bengal, Mugma field (in Dhanbad district), Rajmahal Coalmines Projects (in Godda district) and Chitra-Saharjuri Coalfield (in Deoghar district) in Jharkhand. The heart of the Raniganj Coalfield is located south of the Ajay River and north of the Damodar River in Paschim Bardhaman district. Mejia (in Bankura district) and Parbelia (in Purulia district) are located south of the Damodar. Palasthali (in Birbhum district) is located north of the Ajay. The Mugma field is located west of the Barakar River and north of the Damodar.

The formation of coal seams in the Raniganj Coalfield-Mugma field of ECL has occurred mainly in Raniganj measures and Barakar measures. The Santhal Pargana mines and the Rajmahal Area are mainly related to Barakar measures and Talchair series.

== Reserves ==
As of 1 April 2012, ECL has proved reserves of 16.94 billion tonnes – 12.42 billion tonnes in West Bengal and 4.52 billion tonnes in Jharkhand. Total reserves in the ECL command area, up to a depth of 600 m, was 49.17 billion tonnes.

== Performance ==
As of 2017, Eastern Coalfields had 14 operating areas with 87 working mines, 60 being underground mines, 19 open cast and 8 mixed mines. In 2016–17, ECL produced 40.517 million tonnes of coal, of which 32.319 million tonnes were from open cast mines and 8.127 million tonnes were from underground mines. It was the highest ever production. Offtake of coal from ECL by the power sector was 40.121 million tonnes in 2016–17.

In 2016, ten miners at the Eastern Coalfields' Lalmatia Colliery were killed and others trapped when earth fell on them.

== Operating areas ==
A broad area-wise distribution of coalmines of Eastern Coalfield Limited is given below:

Area	Collieries
Bankola	Bankola Colliery, Khandra Colliery, Kumardih A Colliery, Kumardih B Colliery, Moira Colliery, Nakrakonda Colliery, Shankarpur Colliery, Shyamsundarpur Colliery, Tilaboni Colliery
Jhanjra	Main Industrial Complex (MIC), I & II Incline, I & B Incline, 3 & 4 Incline
Kajora	Central Kajora Colliery, Khas Kajora Colliery, Lachipur Colliery, Madhusudanpur Colliery, Madhabpur Colliery, Naba Kajora Colliery
Salanpur	Bonjemehari Colliery, Barmondia Colliery, Dabor, Gourandi Colliery, Gourandi Begunia Colliery, Mohonpur OCP
Pandaveswar	Dalurband Colliery, Khottadih OCP, Khottadih UG, Mandhaipur Colliery, Manderbony Colliery, Pandaveswar Colliery, South Samla Colliery
Rajmahal	Lalmatia Coalfield in Godda, Jharkhand
Salanpur	Bonjemehari Colliery, Barmondia Colliery, Dabor, Gourandi Colliery, Gourandi Begunia Colliery, Mohonpur OCP
Sonpur Bazari	Sonpur Bazari Project
S.P.Mines	Chitra in Deoghar, Jharkhand
Kenda	Chora 7 &9 Pit colliery, CL Jambad OCP, Jambad UG, Jambad OCP, Bahula colliery, Porascole Colliery, Chhora Block Incline, Shankarpur OCP, New Kenda Open-cast project

Note: All the linked Area pages provide relevant details of the collieries and carry maps indicating the location of the collieries

== Mining plan ==
An overview of the mining plan of ECL covering 12 clusters is given below. Further details are available on the linked Area pages.

Cluster	Area covered	No. of Mines	Normal Production Capacity million tonnes/year	Peak Production Capacity million tonnes/year
1	Mugma	11	2.70	3.30
2	Mugma	3	0.36	0.45
3	Salanpur	3	3.33	3.93
4	Salanpur	3	6.35	7.79
5	Sodepur	2	0.485	0.63
6	Sodepur	9	1.453	2.25
7	Salanpur	4	0.58	0.74
8	Sripur, Satgram	7	1.53	2.75
9	Sripur, Satgram, Kunustoria	15	6.25	8.00
10	Kunustoria, Kajora, Bankola	19	6.349	7.70
11	Kenda, Bankola	11	9.1	9.9
12	Pandaveswar, Sonpur Bazari, Jhanjra, Bankola	19	-	31.83
