= Jemari =

- village
- Location in West Bengal, India Jemari (India)
- Coordinates: 23.797261°N 86.880873°E
- Country: India
- State: West Bengal
- District: Paschim Bardhaman

Population (2011)
  - Total: 4,321

Languages*
  - Official: Bengali, Hindi, English
- Time zone: UTC+5:30 (IST)
- Vehicle registration: WB
- Lok Sabha constituency: Asansol
- Vidhan Sabha constituency: Barabani
- Website: bardhaman.gov.in

Jemari is a village in Salanpur CD Block in Asansol Sadar subdivision of Paschim Bardhaman district in the state of West Bengal, India.

== Geography ==
Jemari is located at 23°47′50″N 86°52′51″E. At the western fringe of the area the Barakar forms the boundary with Jharkhand.

== Demographics ==
As per the 2011 Census of India, Jemari had a total population of 4,321 of which 2,281 (53%) were males and 2,040 (47%) were females. Population below 6 years was 683. The total number of literates in Jemari was 2,255 (61.98% of the population over 6 years).

*For language details see Salanpur (community development block)#Language and religion

As of 2001 India census, Jemari had a population of 3,865. Males constitute 56% of the population and females 44%. Jemari has an average literacy rate of 53%, lower than the national average of 59.5%: male literacy is 63%, and female literacy is 41%. In Jemari, 15% of the population is under 6 years of age.

== Education ==
Jemari has one primary school.
