= Ethora =

- Village
- Location in West Bengal, India Ethora (India)
- Coordinates: 23.7541°N 86.9235°E
- Country: India
- State: West Bengal
- District: Paschim Bardhaman

Population (2011)
  - Total: 4,547

Languages
  - Official: Bengali, Hindi, English
- Time zone: UTC+5:30 (IST)
- Lok Sabha constituency: Asansol
- Vidhan Sabha constituency: Barabani
- Website: bardhaman.gov.in

Ethora is a rural suburb of Asansol, located in the Salanpur CD block in the Asansol Sadar subdivision of the Paschim Bardhaman district in the Indian state of West Bengal. It was a site of the first attempts at commercial coal extraction in the country. The area presently is a coal-mining area. It is in Raniganj Coalfield and lies in the Salanpur Area of Eastern Coalfields.

== History ==
In 1774, two employees of the East India Company, Suetonius Grant Heatly and John Sumner, proposed to establish six mines in an area which they defined as

within the space included by the river Adji to the north, the border of Burdwan to the east, the river Damooda to the south, and a circular line to the west, described from the town of Aytura in Pachete, at the distance of ten miles from Aytura, between the one river and the other.

A site at Ethora was among the six selected and was probably the first to operate. (Note: These are old transliterations. The Damooda is the Damodar River, the Adji is probably the Ajay River, and Aytura is Ethora. The men referred also to Bheerbhoom, which may be today's Birbhum district.)

According to the anthropologist Morton Klass, by 1963 it "had become a sleepy village of mud houses scattered among the ruins of once much grander buildings." However, until the independence of India from British rule in 1947 it had been of local significance as it was home to a zamindar successor to the Maharajah of Kasipur and to both religious centres and schools, although it had never possessed a market. Klass noted in 1978 that it was still a focal point of sorts for the villages that surrounded it because many Brahmin priests continued to live there, along with other castes with specialist occupational roles.

== Geography ==
Collieries in Salanpur Area of Eastern Coalfields
U: Underground Colliery, O: Open Cast Colliery, N: Non-ECL Colliery, S: Mining support, A: Administrative headquarters, R: Rural centre
Owing to space constraints in the small map, the actual locations in a larger map may vary slightly

=== Location ===
Ethora is located at 23.7541°N 86.9235°E.

=== Overview ===
Salanpur CD block is part of the Ajay Damodar Barakar tract. This area is sort of an extension of the Chota Nagpur Plateau. It is a rocky undulating area with laterite soil, with the Ajay on the north, the Damodar on the south and the Barakar on the west. For ages the area was heavily forested and infested with plunderers and marauders. The discovery of coal, in the eighteenth century, led to industrialisation of the area and most of the forests have been cleared.

== Demographics ==
According to the 2011 Census of India, Ethora had a total population of 4,547 of which 2,328 (51%) were males and 2,219 (49%) were females. Population in the age group 0–6 years was 513. The total number of literate persons in Ethora was 2,731 (67.70% of the population over 6 years).

*For language details see Salanpur (community development block)#Language and religion

== Education ==
Ethora S.C. Institution is a Bengali-medium coeducational institution established in 1910. It has facilities for teaching from class V to class XII. The school has 1 computer, a library with 2,500 books and a playground.

== Healthcare ==
In August 1921 the village suffered an epidemic and at that time the population was recorded as being 1902. The Journal of Tropical Medicine and Hygiene reported that "the primary cause was neglected diarrhoea, due to eating indigestible food".

== See also ==
Sodepur Area - for Chinakuri, another place where coal-mining had an early beginning
