= Hindustan Cables =

Government-owned telecom cables company

Hindustan Cables Limited
- Founded: 1952
- Headquarters: Kolkata, West Bengal, India
- Number of employees: 2,818

Hindustan Cables Limited (HCL) was a government-owned company that made telecom cables in India. It was under the Ministry of Heavy Industries and Public Enterprises.

== Foundation and growth ==
Hindustan Cables was founded at Rupnarayanpur in Asansol, West Bengal in 1952. Present headquarters is Kolkata. The objective was to make India self-reliant in manufacturing communications cables. The company has grown to make a broader line of products in locations in Hyderabad (Telangana), Naini, Allahabad (Uttar Pradesh) as well as the original plant in Rupnarayanpur. In 1984 HCL acquired Machine Tool Works in Narendrapur, Calcutta from Cycle Corporation of India. Products include jelly-filled and fibre-optic cables, telephone and computer cords.

== Decline ==
HCL was profitable until 1994, but began incurring losses in 1995. The company was referred to the Board for Industrial and Financial Reconstruction, which was unable to revive it. At one time the company had over 7,000 workers, but by August 2006 there were fewer than half that number and in 2003 Bharat Sanchar Nigam Limited (BSNL), the state-owned telecom provider, stopped placing orders. Tata Consultancy Services was brought in to review the situation and recommended investment to diversify into new product lines. On 17 August 2006 there was a debate in Lok Sabha on revival of HCL, whose employees were not being paid their salaries.

== Revival ==
In 2002 the ministry was considering merging HCL with the Ordnance Factory Board. In the years 2011–13 proposal was submitted for handing over HCL to Ministry of Defence. Good progress has been made and restructuring is under way for the organisation. Several visits were made to the units by IOFS officers. Further action is underway, awaiting budget sanction, but nothing is held. Eighteen months' salary of employees are still pending.
