= Akanksha Kumari =

Indian engineer

Akanksha Kumari, from Barkagaon, Hazaribagh, a student of Jawahar Navodaya Vidyalaya and a graduate of Birsa Institute of Technology Sindri, is the first Indian female engineer to be employed underground in mining in India. In 2021 she was recruited to work for Central Coalfields at the Churi mines in the North Karanpura Area.
