= Salanpur Area =

- Location in West Bengal Salanpur Area (India)
- Location: 23°46′36″N 86°53′00″E
- Products: Non-coking coal
- Company: Eastern Coalfields Limited
- Website: http://www.easterncoal.gov.in/

Salanpur Area is one of the 14 operational areas of Eastern Coalfields Limited located in Asansol subdivision of Paschim Bardhaman district, in the state of West Bengal, India.

== Geography ==
Collieries in Salanpur Area of Eastern Coalfields
U: Underground Colliery, O: Open Cast Colliery, N: Non-ECL Colliery, S: Mining support, A: Administrative headquarters, R: Rural centre
Owing to space constraints in the small map, the actual locations in a larger map may vary slightly

=== Location ===
Salanpur Area is located around 23.7768°N 86.8832°E.

It is bounded by rural areas of Jamtara district of Jharkhand, across the Ajay, on the north, Sripur Area on the east, Sodepur Area on the south, and Mugma Area in Dhanbad district of Jharkhand, across the Barakar, on the west, Maithon Dam and reservoir is at the north-west corner of the Area.

The map alongside shows some of the collieries in the Area. However, as the collieries do not have individual pages, there are no links in the full screen map.

=== Urbanisation ===
As per the 2011 census, 83.33% of the population of Asansol Sadar subdivision was urban and 16.67% was rural. In 2015, the municipal areas of Kulti, Raniganj and Jamuria were included within the jurisdiction of Asansol Municipal Corporation. Asansol Sadar subdivision has 26 (+1 partly) Census Towns.(partly presented in the map a little below; all places marked on the map are linked in the full-screen map).

=== Coal mining ===
Collieries in the Salanpur Area of Eastern Coalfields are: Dabor, Sagramgarh, Begunia, Khoirabad, Modarbahal, Barmondia, Chakballavpur, Sangramgarh OCP, Gourandi OCP, Bonjemehari OCP, Mohanpur OCP and Balmiya OCP.

As per ECL website telephone numbers, operational collieries in the Salanpur Area in 2018 are: Bonjemehari Colliery, Barmondia Colliery, Dabor, Gourandi Colliery, Gourandi Begunia Colliery and Mohonpur OCP.

Non-ECL collieries are outside the Salanpur Area and are included here because they operate in a contiguous area.

Cities, towns and ECL Areas in the western portion of Asansol Sadar subdivision in Paschim Bardhaman district
MC: municipal corporation, P: rural administrative unit, CT: census town, N: neighbourhood, OG: out growth, T:temple
Owing to space constraints in the small map, the actual locations in a larger map may vary slightly

Ramnagore Colliery, under the control of the Collieries Division of SAIL, is located in the southern part of the Salanpur Area.

The Chanch Victoria Area of BCCL is spread over West Bengal and Jharkhand. The West Bengal part of the Chanch Victoria Area was located at the south-western edge of Salanpur Area. While collieries such as Damagoria and Borira are still in operation, other collieries such as Victoria and Victoria West have been closed.

Private companies such as CESC also have mines in the region.

== Mining plan ==
An overview of the proposed mining activity plan in Cluster 3, a group of 3 mines in Salanpur Area, as of 2012, is as follows:

1. Dabor underground mine, with normative annual production capacity of 0.6 million tonnes and peak annual production capacity of 0.7 mt, had an expected life of over 25 years. Dabor phase I & II open cast mine, with normative annual production capacity of 2.0 mt and peak annual production capacity of 2.7 mt, had an expected life of 10 years.
2. Bonjemehari UG mine, with normative and peak annual production capacity of 0.07 mt, had an expected life of over 25 years. Bonjemehari OC mine had an expected life of 4 years.
3. Sangramgarh UG mine, with normative annual production capacity of 0.05 mt and peak annual production capacity of 0.08 mt, had an expected life of over 25 years. Sangramgarh OC mine had an expected life of 4 years.

Operational Areas of ECL (Source:ENVIS Centre on Environmental Problems of Mining)

An overview of the proposed mining activity plan in Cluster 4, a group of 3 mines in Salanpur Area, as of 2015, is as follows:

1. Khoirabad underground mine has no UG potential left. Coal at the in-crop is left which can be extracted by opencast only. The proposed OC mine had an expected life of 4 years.
2. Gaurandih UG mine, with normative annual production capacity of 0.05 mt and peak annual production capacity of 0.08 mt, had an expected life of over 50 years. Gaurandih OC patch had an expected life of 5 years. Gaurandih Begunia OC mine, with normative annual production capacity of 1.8 million tonnes and peak annual production capacity of 2.0 mt, had an expected life of 7 years.
3. Itapara OC project (a new proposal), with normative annual production capacity of 0.4 million tonnes and peak annual production capacity of 0.5 mt, had an expected life of 26 years,

An overview of the proposed mining activity plan in Cluster 7, a group of 4 mines in Salanpur and Sripur Area, as of 2015–16, is as follows:

1. Barmondia UG mine, with normative annual production capacity of 0.020 million tonnes and peak annual production capacity of 0.030 mt, had an expected life of more than 10 years. As of 2015–16, there was no production from the mine.
2. Chakballavpur UG mine, with normative annual production capacity of 0.030 million tonnes and peak annual production capacity of 0.040 mt, had an expected life of more than 10 years. Lower Dhadka seam (R-VII) was being worked in the mine.
3. Manoharbahal UG mine, with normative annual production capacity of 0.030 million tonnes and peak annual production capacity of 0.040 mt, had an expected life of more than 10 years. As of 2015–16, there was no production from the mine.
4. Bhanora West UG mine, with normative annual production capacity of 0.10 million tonnes and peak annual production capacity of 0.13 mt, had an expected life of more than 20 years. Bhanora West OC patch had an expected life of 3.5 years. Sripur (R-VI) seam, with gradient varying from 1 in 5.5 to 1 in 7 and degree II gassiness, is being worked.

== Illegal coal mining ==
India is the third largest coal producer in the world. Mining is a highly organized industry, but there are gaps and loopholes. Beyond, or rather underneath, the well-organised industry, there is a large sector described as illegal mining. According to Haradhan Roy, the veteran political leader and trade unionist, about a million tonnes of coal are produced by illegal collieries in Raniganj alone. The total annual national production from such mines in India is not less than 20 million tonnes. In 2001 there were at least 33 identified sites of unauthorized mining in Raniganj. Of these many were in Salanpur, Sripur, Satgram and Sodepur Areas. Seven are outside ECL's lease-hold land. However, apart from the identified areas, such activities are spread across the entire region.

Systematic mining and movement of coal by the railways, started in the mid-nineteenth century in the Raniganj Coalfields, led by Carr, Tagore and Company. The conventional "board and pillar" system was used in Indian underground collieries. In this system coal pillars are left behind to support the roof and the vacant space was not always filled with sand. ECL leaves a mine as soon as it is ‘uneconomic’, leaving the remaining coal for others to scavenge upon. There are around 1,380 abandoned pits and inclines of ECL in the region.

The veteran CITU leader, Sunil Basu Roy, described the workers of the illegal mines as "the wretched on the earth" – they have nowhere else to go and no other means of survival. In Gourandi village, near Asansol, around 5,000 people work in shifts in an open cast mine. Work in such mines are labour-intensive and machines are unknown. The poor who rush into such jobs come from all segments of society, the Adivasi and other locals and migrants. They are quite often in the news when accidents occur.

== Subsidence ==
Traditionally many underground collieries have left a void after taking out the coal. As a result, almost all areas are facing subsidence. As per CMPDIL, there were 3 points of subsidence in the Salanpur Area involving 6.38 hectares of land.

== Migrants ==
Prior to the advent of coal mining, the entire region was a low-productive rice crop area in what was once a part of the Jungle Mahals. The ownership of land had passed on from local adivasis to agricultural castes before mining started. However, the Santhals and the Bauris, referred to by the colonial administrators as "traditional coal cutters of Raniganj" remained attached to their lost land and left the mines for agricultural related work, which also was more remunerative. It forced the mine-owners to bring in outside labour, mostly from Bihar, Odisha and Uttar Pradesh. In time the migrants dominated the mining and industrial scenario. The pauperization and alienation of the adivasis have been major points of social concern.

== Transport ==
The Asansol–Patna section, which is a part of Howrah-Delhi main line passes through the Salanpur Area. State Highway 5 (West Bengal) running from Rupnarayanpur (in Bardhaman district) to Junput (in Purba Medinipur district) originates from this block.

Asansol-Chittaranjan road links to both NH 19 and Grand Trunk Road and thereafter it links to Jamtara in Jharkhand and from there to places such as Dumka and Karmatanr.

== Healthcare ==
Salanpur Hospital of ECL functions with 50 beds.

== See also ==
Chanch/ Victoria Area of BCCL functioning in the same region.
