= Suetonius Grant Heatly =

British East India Company judge (1751–1793)

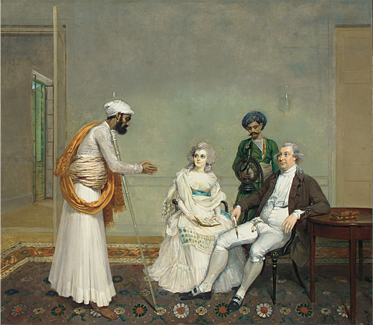
Suetonius Grant Heatly and his sister, Temperance. (Arthur William Devis, c. 1786)

Suetonius Grant Heatly (sometimes spelled as Heatley; 1751–1793) was a judge employed by the British East India Company and, with John Sumner, established what is considered to be the first coal mine in India.

Heatly was born in Newport, Rhode Island, in what is now the United States, to a family that had a Scottish heritage.and was loyal to the British Crown. That loyalty caused them to move to England around the time of the American Revolution. His connections and ability were useful in his career with the East India Company, which he joined in 1766 and for which he held various offices.

Grant and his colleague, Sumner, saw potential in the extraction of coal in India and attempted to capitalise on that and their relationship with the East India Company, which they envisaged as being a significant purchaser. Their project involved several mine workings, the precise location of which has been debated. It was beset by problems, including those related to extraction, logistics and disease, and eventually petered out. Sumner had left before its demise, and others had become involved.

Heatly, who never married but may have formed a relationship with a native Indian woman, died in 1793.

== Early life ==
Heatly was born in Newport, Rhode Island in 1751. He was the oldest son of a merchant, Andrew Heatly, and his wife, Mary (née Grant), both of whom were of Scots descent. His younger siblings included a brother, Patrick, and a sister, Temperance. (Note: Patrick Heatly (1753, Rhode Island – 1834, London) was also an employee of the East India Company, working first in India and then as a member of its "secret Council" in England. Temperance married a captain of the Royal Navy, William Green, possibly while also in India, and eventually settled in Utica, New York, USA.) Another sister, Mary, was the mother of the historian, cartographer and administrator of Rajasthan, James Tod.

The Heatly family was loyal to the British crown, and those of the family living in America at the time of the American Revolution against British control chose to leave. Temperance subsequently returned after being married.

== East India Company ==
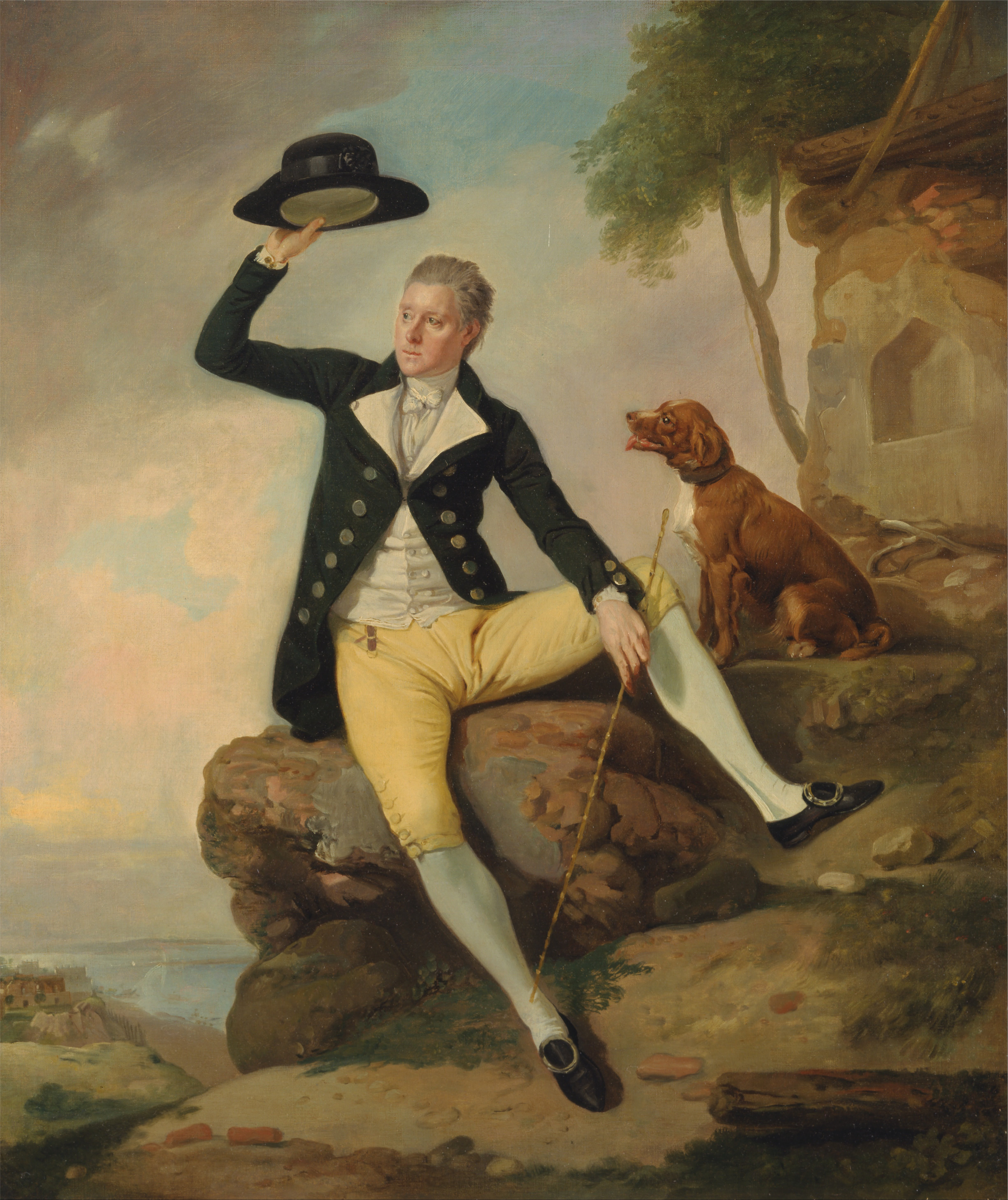
Portrait of Patrick Heatly, brother of Suetonius Grant Heatly and administrator for the East India Company, by Johann Zoffany.

Heatly joined the East India Company as a "writer" in 1766, and later worked as a merchant. His easy manner, his family's loyalty to Britain, and his connections to other American royalists stood him in good stead within the Company at the time of the American Revolution and beyond. When Cornwallis was appointed Governor-General of India, still smarting from his military defeats in America, Heatly became a favourite. He was Collector of Chotanagpur and Palamu by 1774 and by 1783 he held a similar position for Purnia. He held that position still in 1788.

He became a magistrate for the province of Dana and at the time of his death was the chief judge of appeals for Decca.

Although Heatly worked for the Company, one of his contemporaries – William Green – suggested that he could be used as a conduit for letters which might subvert the aims of the Company. A 1784 letter sent by Green to Christopher Champlin in the USA, discussed plans for a trading voyage to Bengal and elsewhere. Green says

My letters will doubtless pass by way of London, unless I have an opportunity of addressing you directly from India. The jealousy of the English East India Company has been excited .... If you chuse to hazard writing me in India, you must write covertly to me. Direct your letters under cover to Suetonius Heatly, Esqr. Calcutta, Bengal and send them to be forwarded to me, to the care of Mr. Wilkinson, London; never failing to address me as your Supercargo, because if the letters are intercepted no mischief can ensue. The late Revolution has embittered the minds and spirits of many, and made them attentive to all our motions.

== Coal mining ==
Kautilya recorded mining activities in India around 400 BCE, in his Arthashastra but these operations related to precious stones and metals rather than coal. The first documented discovery of coal was in 1774, when Heatly and Sumner (another colonial administrator) saw it being used to create fires while they were travelling on the Damodar River. J. Homfray, the manager of a colliery at Narayankuri and the first person to write a detailed account of the Raniganj Coalfield, says that the area was at that time under the rule of the Rajah of Ramghur and that

... it is an historical fact, that Mr Heatly, at that time being politically employed by Government, captured the Rajah, and probably obtained a knowledge of the existence of coal through some attendant circumstances ...

On 11 August 1774 they put forward a proposal for commercial extraction in a part of what now forms the Raniganj Coalfield.

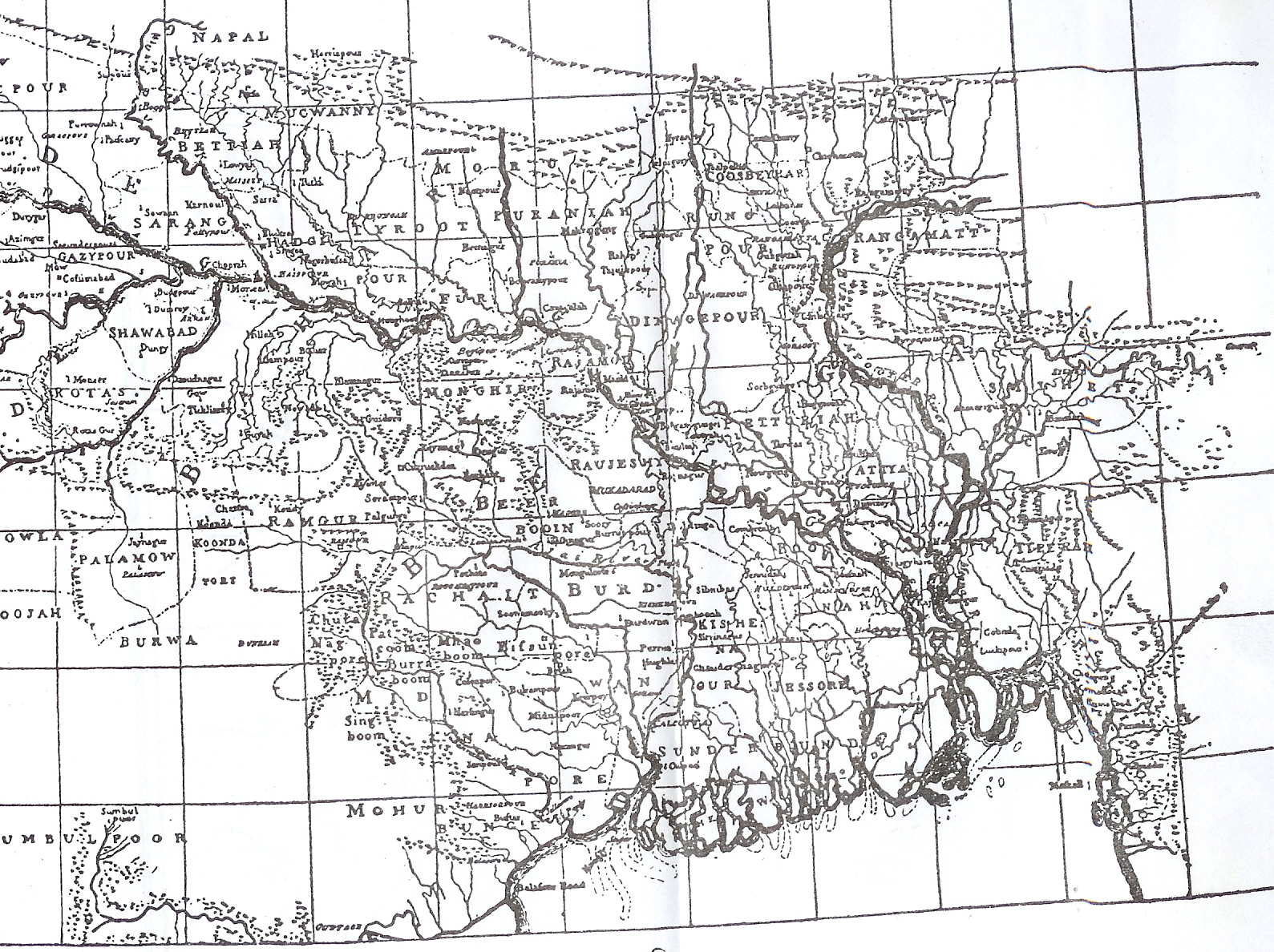
James Rennell's map of ca. 1765, showing many of the placenames referred to.

Heatly and Sumner proposed to establish six mines in an area which they defined as

within the space included by the river Adji to the north, the border of Burdwan to the east, the river Damooda to the south, and a circular line to the west, described from the town of Aytura in Pachete, at the distance of ten miles from Aytura, between the one river and the other. (Note: These are old transliterations. The Damooda is the Damodar River, the Adji is probably the Ajay River, and Aytura is probably the place today known as Ethora. The men referred also to Bheerbhoom, which may be today's Birbhum district.)

They wrote to Warren Hastings, the Governor-General, requesting

That an exclusive right be granted to us for eighteen years of working coal mines and selling coal in Bengal and its dependencies, so long as we can engage to furnish as much pit-coal as ever the Government may bespeak of us for their consumption at the market price of the time, when wanted.

The proposal discussed the possibility of exports and included the stipulation that they would retain the rights to any other minerals and metals discovered in the area on payment of a 20% royalty to the Company, a figure which also applied to the coal. They made an exception for any iron that might be found, suggesting that the Company should determine the nature of any rights if and when it occurred. It was also suggested that European workers would be employed. An agreement was reached by October 1774, by which time a third person, called Redfearne (sometimes, Redferne), had joined in business with Heatly and Sumner.

Homfray believes that the first of the mines to be worked was at the village of Hattoreah Aytoorah, being a place where the coal seam came to the surface. (Note: Other mines among the six opened were at "Chinacoory" (Chinakuri) and Damoully. Hunter speculates that the other three workings were further westwards.) By September 1775 around 2500 maunds (91.5 imperial tons) of coal had been sent by river to Calcutta for testing. These tests were delayed, at least in part because the partners in the business were also engaged in their duties on behalf of the East India Company. Some prompting in 1777 caused the tests finally to be undertaken in January 1778. The results showed that the coal was of too poor a quality for use by the Company, producing 50% less heat than British coal. (Note: Coal was sent to India from Britain as ballast in ships.) (Note: William Wilson Hunter, in summarising the accounts of others writing before him, states that "Coal was known to exist in the District as early as 1774, and was actually worked in 1777." However, in his table listing various workings in the coalfield he shows an entry for a source worked at "Damulia" (Damoully), using the quarry method, with the opening date stated as "1774?")

Sumner had returned to England after the tests, and European miners brought in by Heatly were ravaged by disease. Furthermore, Heatly was posted far away to Purnia, making personal supervision impossible, and from 1781 the East India Company began to make it more difficult for its employees to conduct private ventures of this nature. These were all additional issues, on top of the loss of the East India Company as a potentially large purchaser, and the venture petered out. It was not until around 1814–1815 that the first coal pit was sunk for the purpose of extraction in India.

== Death ==
Heatly died in Bengal in 1793. Although unmarried, a nephew has suggested that Heatly "formed a connection with a native of the Country, a thing of frequent occurrence at that time in India, by whom he had several children, whom he educated well and provided for – a daughter of his Mary was sent to England for her education." Christie's, the auctioneers, note that a 1786 portrait of an Indian woman possibly called "Ann" and painted by Charles Smith in Lucknow, might be that bibi (mistress), although bibis did not usually take English names. They add that an Ann Heatly married Joseph Welsh in Calcutta in 1792. Heatly himself was painted, together with his sister Temperance, in Calcutta by Arthur William Devis. (Note: The painting by Devis was attributed to Johann Zoffany until around 1979.)

A subsequent obituary of his brother, Patrick, recorded that Heatly had been "well known ... for talent and amiability".

In 1884 and 1885, long after his death, notices appeared in The London Gazette advising that he was among a group of people who had not claimed shares in the British Fisheries Society and giving his position as Collector of Purnia.
