= Carr, Tagore and Company =

Managing agency and holding company in the Company Raj

- Company type: Managing Agency
- Industry: Indigo and opium trade, shipping, coal mining
- Founded: 1834
- Headquarters: Calcutta, Bengal Presidency
- Key people: Dwarakanath Tagore; William Carr

Carr, Tagore and Company (also written as Carr, Tagore & Co.) was the first equal partnership between European and Indian businessmen and the initiator of the managing agency system in India. The company was launched in 1834 by Dwarakanath Tagore in partnership with William Carr, an indigo trader of Kolkata (then known as Calcutta). Dwarakanath played a leading role in the company, providing its capital, selecting its partners and directing its investment strategy throughout his life.

== Backdrop ==
The period starting from the late 18th century to the mid-19th century was one of great change. The Industrial Revolution was having a great impact on power equations across the world. The British were reworking their strategy in India. The Charter Act 1813 ended the monopoly of the East India Company in India’s overseas trade, except for some items. It opened a flood gate of opportunities for many people. In such an environment Carr, Tagore and Company was a kind of modern day holding company, which promoted many of Dwarakanath’s pioneering efforts. Soon after its formation, the company became a market leader in indigo trade. Trading in opium, then the currency of world trade, was in the hands of the Europeans and only non-Europeans allowed to handle the contraband material were Parsis. Dwarakanath managed to get an entry into the trade as something like a middle level sub-agent. In capital starved India, the inflow of cash from it gave Dwarkanath an opportunity to toy with a new idea. Carr, Tagore and Company entered the fledgling coal business.

== Coal ==
In 1770, Suetonius Grant Heatly and John Sumner teamed up to get permission of the East India Company to mine coal. The permission was not granted and they tried again in 1774 and succeeded in getting permission. Miners were brought in from England but they fell sick and died. The problem could be solved by engaging local miners but transportation proved a bottleneck. The Damodar had enough water only few months of the year for transporting coal and so the coal mined had to be stacked for a long time. That degraded its quality. A test carried out in 1778, showed that Indian coal was only half as effective as imported British coal. That sealed the efforts of Heatly and Sumner.

The coal front was quiet for some time, but as the demand for coal picked up in Kolkata, in 1814 the economics of mining Indian coal made sense again. The East India Company sponsored William Jones for mining coal in Bardhaman (then Burdwan). He took land on lease from the Rani of Bardhaman and named it Raniganj in her honour. Jones mined coal but incurred persistent losses. In 1821, Alexander & Company, which had secured the loans taken by Jones, took over and started mining. They performed better, raised production and even earned profits for some time, but the company failed in 1832. It was subsequently taken over by Carr, Tagore and Company.

In his biography, Partner in Empire: Dwarakanath Tagore and the Age of Enterprise in Eastern India, Blair B. King says, "The purchase of Raniganj was the most important single transaction of Dwarakanth’s business transactions." King opines that the firm had managerial and technical expertise, plenty of capital and vital ability to handle both the Kolkata officials and the local powers. In C. D. Taylor they had a very effective mine manager at site. There were two troublesome rivals: Jeremiah Homfray, who had a mine at Naraincoory, and the Erskine brothers, with a mine at Munglepore. Carr, Tagore and Company fought with them on many fronts and tried to establish themselves as the sole supplier of coal in the region. In 1843, Homfray’s mine was taken over by Carr, Tagore and Company to form Bengal Coal Company, whose first action was to close Homfray’s mine. The British authorities were not happy with the near-monopoly of Carr, Tagore and Company in the field of coal mining. They tried to break it but failed. Bengal’s industrial development started taking off, powered by Bengal Coal Company’s coal. After the formation of Bengal Coal Company, the coal industry started getting regularised, but Dwarakanath Tagore, the prime mover, started losing interest in it.

== Railways ==
Dwarakanath was fascinated by steam engines, which had fuelled the Industrial Revolution in Europe. He dreamt of revolutionising Indian industry with the steam engine. He imported steam engines from England for use in his business ventures. Having seen the earliest railways in Europe he was convinced about their utility in India.

With the objective of building a railway from Kolkata to Raniganj, that would carry all his coal to Kolkata, he registered the Great Western of Bengal Railway Company in 1845 and appointed Carr, Tagore and Company its agent. Dwarakanath tried his best to have a deal with the then newly formed East Indian Railway Company but never succeeded. East India Company flatly refused to allow him to build a railway because it felt that it was inappropriate to have railways ‘under the control of natives’. The first steam engine of the East Indian Railway Company chugged into Raniganj in 1855. Dwarakanath was dead and gone, but the railways did carry to Kolkata coal mined by the company he had founded. That really was a great chapter in the annals of Indian business marking the beginning of systematic coal mining in India.

== See also ==
- Coal mining in India
