= Bauri (caste) =

Hindu caste in eastern India

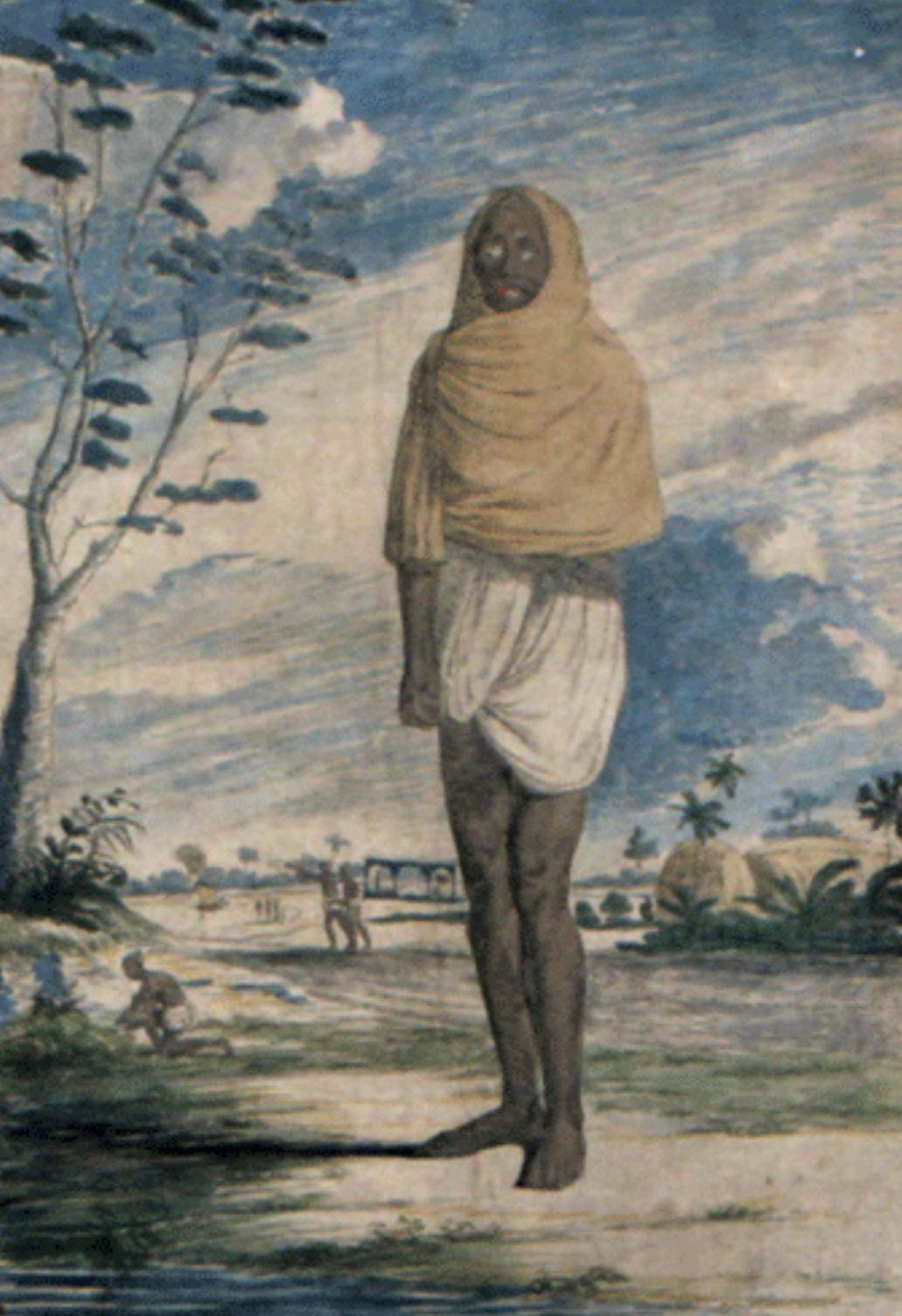
- Bauri bearer and grass cutter, from a 1799 collection of etchings

Total population
- c. 1.9 million (2011, census)

Regions with significant populations
- India
- West Bengal: 1,228,635
- Odisha: 523,127
- Jharkhand: 186,356
- Bihar: 2,233

Languages
- Regional languages (Bengali, Odia)

Religion
- Hinduism

Bauri is a Hindu caste primarily residing in the state of West Bengal, India where it is considered as one of the Scheduled Castes. There are significant Bauri populations in the states of Odisha, Jharkhand and Bihar. They are usually involved in activities like farming, mainly as agricultural labourers.

Bauris numbered 1,091,022 in the 2001 census in the state of West Bengal. 37.5 per cent of the Bauris were literate - 51.8 per cent males and 22.7 per cent females were literate. Only 4.7 per cent of the Bauris were matriculates or completed schooling.

== Distribution ==
They are primarily residing in Bengal found in large numbers in Bankura, Birbhum, Purulia and other districts in Indian state of West Bengal, Assam, Tripura and Orissa. The village of Purbo Tila in Chatlapur Tea Garden, Kulaura and Dakchara Tea Garden, Srimangal, Moulvibazar District are also home to Bauri communities in Bangladesh. They are also found in many villages like Chhatna and Beliatore.

== Practices ==
Traces of totemism still survive in their reverence for the red-backed heron. The heron is looked upon as the emblem of the community.

== Classification ==
The Bauri caste is categorised as a Scheduled Caste in West Bengal, Odisha, Jharkhand, and Bihar, while in Assam, they are recognised as an Ex Tea garden community and the Bauri of Assam and Tripura placed within the Other Backward Classes.

== Notable people ==
- Sandhya Bauri, MP from Bishnupur (Lok Sabha constituency)
- Susmita Bauri, MP from Bishnupur (Lok Sabha constituency)
- Amar Kumar Bauri, MLA in Jharkhand Legislative Assembly
