= Chelad =

Chelad Chelod
- Census Town
- Location in West Bengal, India Chelad (India)
- Coordinates: 23.639816°N 87.02769°E
- Country: India
- State: West Bengal
- District: Paschim Bardhaman

Area
  - Total: 3.93 km^{2} (1.52 sq mi)

Population (2011)
  - Total: 7,471
  - Density: 1,900/km^{2} (4,920/sq mi)

Languages*
  - Official: Bengali, Hindi, English
- Time zone: UTC+5:30 (IST)
- PIN: 713339
- Telephone code: 0341
- Vehicle registration: WB
- Lok Sabha constituency: Asansol
- Vidhan Sabha constituency: Asansol Dakshin
- Website: paschimbardhaman.co.in

Chelad (also spelled Chelod) is a census town in the Raniganj CD block in the Asansol Sadar subdivision of the Paschim Bardhaman district in the state of West Bengal, India.

== Geography ==
Cities and towns in the eastern portion of Asansol Sadar subdivision in Paschim Bardhaman district
MC: Municipal Corporation, CT: census town, N: neighbourhood, R: rural centre
Owing to space constraints in the small map, the actual locations in a larger map may vary slightly

=== Location ===
Chelod is located at 23°38′23″N 87°01′40″E.

The Asansol-Durgapur region has undulating laterite soil. This area lies between the Damodar and the Ajay.

Pangachhiya, Majiara, Bhanowara, Domohani, Charanpur (OG), Ratibati and Chelad form a cluster of census towns and an outgrowth on the northern and eastern sides of Asansol.

=== Urbanisation ===
According to the 2011 census, 83.33% of the population of Asansol Sadar subdivision was urban and 16.67% was rural. In 2015, the municipal areas of Kulti, Raniganj and Jamuria were included within the jurisdiction of Asansol Municipal Corporation. Asansol Sadar subdivision has 26 (+1 partly) Census Towns.(partly presented in the map alongside; all places marked on the map are linked in the full-screen map).

== Demographics ==
According to the 2011 Census of India, Chelad had a total population of 7,471 of which 3,888 (52%) were males and 3,583 (48%) were females. Population in the age range 0–6 years was 845. The total number of literate persons in Chelad was 5,085 (76.74% of the population over 6 years).

*For language details see Raniganj (community development block)#Language and religion

As of 2001 India census, Chelad had a population of 7,901. Males constitute 56% of the population and females 44%. Chelad has an average literacy rate of 57%, lower than the national average of 59.5%; with male literacy of 68% and female literacy of 44%. 12% of the population is under 6 years of age.

== Infrastructure ==
According to the District Census Handbook 2011, Bardhaman, Chelad covered an area of 3.93 km^{2}. Among the civic amenities, it had 1.5 km roads with open drains, the protected water-supply involved service reservoir, tapwater from treated sources, uncovered wells. It had 800 domestic electric connections and 40 road lighting (points). Among the medical facilities, it had 2 dispensary/ health centres, 2 charitable hospitals/ nursing homes, 2 medicine shops. Among the educational facilities it had were 3 primary schools, 1 secondary school, the nearest senior secondary school at Asansol 13 km away. It had 5 non-formal education centres (Sarva Shiksha Abhiyan). An important commodity it produced was furniture. It had the branch office of 1 nationalised bank.

== Education ==
Chelad has two primary and one higher secondary schools. The high school set up in the 1976 and its third batch produced multi starer like Swapan Maji, Kaushik Maji under the direct supervision of its HM Manindra Maji.
