= Pangachhiya =

Panchgachia Pangachhiya
- Census Town
- Location in West Bengal, India Panchgachia (India)
- Coordinates: 23.746796°N 86.953564°E
- Country: India
- State: West Bengal
- District: Paschim Bardhaman

Area
  - Total: 1.22 km^{2} (0.47 sq mi)

Population (2011)
  - Total: 9,165
  - Density: 7,510/km^{2} (19,500/sq mi)

Languages*
  - Official: Bengali, English, Hindi
- Time zone: UTC+5:30 (IST)
- Vehicle registration: WB
- Lok Sabha constituency: Asansol
- Vidhan Sabha constituency: Barabani
- Website: bardhaman.gov.in

Panchgachia (also called Pangachhiya) is a census town in the Barabani CD block in the Asansol Sadar subdivision of the Paschim Bardhaman district in the Indian state of West Bengal.

== Geography ==
Cities, towns and ECL Areas in the western portion of Asansol Sadar subdivision in Paschim Bardhaman district
MC: municipal corporation, P: rural administrative centre, CT: census town, N: neighbourhood, OG: out growth, T: temple
Owing to space constraints in the small map, the actual locations in a larger map may vary slightly

=== Location ===
Panchgachia is located at 23°44′48″N 86°57′13″E.

Panchgachia, Majiara, Bhanowara, Domohani, Charanpur (OG), Ratibati and Chelad form a cluster of census towns and an outgrowth on the northern and eastern sides of Asansol.

=== Urbanisation ===
As per the 2011 census, 83.33% of the population of Asansol Sadar subdivision was urban and 16.67% was rural. In 2015, the municipal areas of Kulti, Raniganj and Jamuria were included within the jurisdiction of Asansol Municipal Corporation. Asansol Sadar subdivision has 26 (+1 partly) Census Towns.(partly presented in the map alongside; all places marked on the map are linked in the full-screen map).

== Demographics ==
According to the 2011 Census of India Panchgachia had a total population of 9,165 of which 4,819 (53%) were males and 4,346 (47%) were females. Population in the age range 0–6 years was 1,084. The total number of literate persons in Panchgachia was 6,073 (75.15% of the population over 6 years).

*For language details see Barabani (community development block)#Language and religion

As of 2001 India census, Panchgachia (B) had a population of 7,668. Males constitute 54% of the population and females 46%. Panchgachia (B) has an average literacy rate of 62%, higher than the national average of 59.5%: male literacy is 70%, and female literacy is 52%. In Panchgachia (B), 12% of the population is under 6 years of age.

== Infrastructure ==
According to the District Census Handbook 2011, Bardhaman, Pangachhiya covered an area of 1.22 km^{2}. Among the civic amenities, it had 35 km roads with both open and covered drains, the protected water supply involved service reservoir, tap water from treated sources, uncovered wells. It had 1,250 domestic electric connections. Among the medical facilities it had 1 medicine shop. Among the educational facilities it had were 6 primary schools, 3 middle schools, 3 secondary schools, 2 senior secondary schools, the nearest general degree college at Asansol 8 km away. Among the social, recreational and cultural facilities, it had a public library. Among the important commodities it produced was stone chips. It had the branch office of 1 nationalised bank.

== Education ==
Panchgachia Manohar Bahal Vivekandna Vidyaytan is a Bengali-medium boys only institution established in 1962. It has facilities for teaching from class V to class XII. The school has 4 computers, a library with 637 books and a playground.

PM Kamala Girls’ High School is a Bengali-medium girls only institution established in 1964. It has facilities for teaching from class V to class XII. The school has 5 computers, a library with 500 books and a play ground.

Panchgachia Adarsha Hindi High School is a Hindi-medium coeducational institution established in 1966. It has facilities for teaching from class IV to class XII. The school has 1 computer and a library with 116 books.
