= Jahanara Khan =

Indian politician

Member of West Bengal Legislative Assembly
- In office 2011–2021
- Preceded by: Dhirajlal Hazra, CPI(M)
- Succeeded by: Hareram Singh, AITC
- Constituency: Jamuria

Personal details
- Born: 1967 (age 58–59) Raniganj, Paschim Bardhaman district, West Bengal
- Party: Communist Party of India (Marxist)
- Education: Raniganj Girls' College
- Alma mater: University of Burdwan

Jahanara Khan is an Indian politician from the Communist Party of India (Marxist) and was a member of the West Bengal Legislative Assembly from 2011 to 2021.

== Early life and education ==
Khan was born on 1967 to a Bengali family of Muslim Khans in Raniganj, Asansol, Paschim Bardhaman district, West Bengal. She is the daughter of Ramzan Khan. Khan completed her education at the Raniganj Girls' College, and graduated with a Bachelor of Arts from University of Burdwan in 1990.

== Career ==
She was elected from Jamuria Assembly constituency as a Communist Party of India (Marxist) candidate following the 2011 West Bengal Legislative Assembly election and re-elected following 2016 West Bengal Legislative Assembly election.

She will stand as her party's candidate for the Asansol (Paschim Bardhaman) parliamentary constituency in the 2024 Indian general election.
