= Department of Public Works (West Bengal) =

Bengal government ministry

West Bengal Public Works Department (WBPWD)
Department overview
- Formed: 1st May, 1854
- Type: Government agency
- Jurisdiction: Government of West Bengal
- Headquarters: Nabanna Bhavan
- Annual budget: ₹6,323.36 crore (2021-2022 est.)
- Minister responsible: Ajay Kumar Poddar, Minister in Charge
- Department executive: Sri Sushmit Banerjee, Engineer In Chief
- Child agencies: 1.MBL 2.WSFL; 3.WBHDCL 4.BEL 5.HRBC
- Website: pwd.wb.gov.in

The Department of Public Works, popularly known as PWD, is one of the departments under the control of Government of West Bengal. Under PWD, the Public Works and Public Works (Roads) Directorates are presently charged with the planning, survey, design, construction and maintenance of Roads, Bridges and Buildings throughout the state as well as having various responsibilities for emergency and relief activities. The current head of the ministry is Ajay Kumar Poddar.

The Department is headed by the Minister-In-Charge. The Secretary takes care of the implementation of the policy decision & administration. The Engineer-in-Chief manages the execution of engineering matters. The Public Works Department has two segments-Secretariats and Directorates.

There are three directorates in the department namely Public Works Directorate, Public Works (Roads) Directorate and Public Works Construction Board Directorate.

== History of Public Works (Pre Independence) ==
In the early days of public works in British India, the P.W.D. was responsible for the construction and maintenance of buildings, roads and irrigation projects such as canals, dams and reservoirs. The management of Public Works Department during this period was not at all systematic and was under the control of Military Board of Imperial Government. But the arrangement did not prove to be much effective. Drawing attention of the Government to the unsatisfactory management and state of affairs in public works, the Court of Directors of the East India Company, in early 1850, instituted a Commission each of the presidencies for investigation. The order became effective in December, 1850 and the Bengal Commission submitted its report in March, 1851. The members of the Commission were unanimous on the inability of the Military Board in the management of the public works department. Lord Dalhousie founded the public works department through which works programme like construction of roads, bridges and other public utility works including extension of irrigation projects were undertaken.

The Governor General of India issued an order No. 430 of 1854 on 21 April 1854 by which the responsibility for management and control of the Public Works Department was entrusted upon the Bengal Presidency with effect from 1 May 1854:

In 1866, P.W.D. was divided into three branches namely, Civil (Roads, Building & Irrigation), Military and Railway. This very year the then Governor General, Lord Lawrence (1864–68) introduced the system of investing in public works by borrowing from the public. The New policy saw implementation of some important projects like Midnapore Canal (1872), Orissa Coast Canal (1882), Rajapur Drainage Canal (1882) etc. During 1870, local government system was introduced by the government. As per a government decision taken in May, 1882 during the tenure of Lord Ripon (1880–84), the local government body in India were recognized following the British Rules. In 1893, provincial services were created in each of the provinces of India. The technical branch staffs were divided into three categories: (i) Engineers (ii) Upper Subordinates (iii) Lower Subordinates. And the engineers were divided into separate services, viz., Imperial Services and Provincial Services. While the Engineers were recruited in England and reserved for the British people only in case of the former services, in case of the latter, appointments were available to the recognized community of the Indians only.

With the complete separation of the Military branch in 1895, the P.W.D. became an exclusive civil department. The P.W.D. became responsible for public works relating to roads, buildings, irrigations and railways from this time. Beside, with the integration and development of local government system, Special types of public works were entrusted upon District Boards and Municipalities.

In 1905, the railways branch was segregated from the P.W.D. and was converted into a separate department under the management and control of Railway Board. The first railway line in India was commissioned in 1853 from Bombay to Thane and train services were introduced. Till 1905 about 3600 miles of railway track was constructed by the P.W.D.

Increased initiative by the British Government for more development increased the work load of P.W.D. considerably. In 1920, the P.W.D. was divided into two separate departments, viz., Public Works and Irrigation.

== Ministerial Team ==
The ministerial team is headed by the Cabinet Minister for Public Works, who may or may not be supported by Ministers of State. Civil servants are assigned to them to manage the ministers' office and ministry.

== Organisation structure ==
Public Works Directorate is headed by Chief Engineers and a coordinating head (Engineer-in-Chief), who has Chief Engineer, Planning; Chief Engineer, Electrical; Chief Engineer, Electrical Planning; Chief Engineer, Social Sector; and Chief Government Architect to assist him. The wings of the directorate are-

- Civil Wing
- Electrical Wing
- Architectural Wing
- Finance Wing
- Roads Wing
- National Highways Wing
- Road and Building Research Institute (R&BRI) with 2 units across the state (R&D Wing)
- Planning Wing
- Project Implementation Unit for Rail Over Bridge Wing
- Bridge Monitoring Wing
- Social Sector Wing

== Directorate Structure ==
- Head Office
  - Engineer-in-Chief
- Zone office
  - Chief Engineer
- Circle office
  - Superintending Engineer
- Division Office
  - Executive Engineers
- Sub-Division Office
  - Assistant Engineers
- Section Office
  - Junior Engineer
