= Agnimitra Paul =

Indian fashion designer and politician

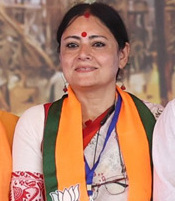
- Paul in 2026

Minister of Urban Development and Municipal Affairs, Government of West Bengal
- Incumbent
- Assumed office 9 May 2026
- Governor: R. N. Ravi
- Chief Minister: Suvendu Adhikari
- Preceded by: Firhad Hakim

Member of West Bengal Legislative Assembly
- Incumbent
- Assumed office 2 May 2021
- Preceded by: Tapas Banerjee
- Constituency: Asansol Dakshin

Vice-President of BJP West Bengal
- Incumbent
- Assumed office 7 January 2026

General Secretary of BJP West Bengal
- In office 22 December 2021 – 7 January 2026

President of BJP Mahila Morcha, West Bengal
- In office 1 June 2020 – 22 December 2021
- Preceded by: Locket Chatterjee
- Succeeded by: Tanuja Chakraborty

Personal details
- Born: Agnimitra Roy; 25 November 1974 (age 51) Asansol, West Bengal, India
- Party: Bharatiya Janata Party (2019–present)
- Spouse: Partho Paul
- Children: 2 sons
- Education: B. B. College (B.Sc. Botany (Honours)); Jadavpur University (MBA); Birla Institute of Liberal Arts and Management Sciences (Fashion Technology)
- Occupation: Fashion designer; Politician

Agnimitra Paul (née Roy; born 25 November 1974) is an Indian fashion designer and politician who serves as the Member of the West Bengal Legislative Assembly from Asansol Dakshin. She had served as the President of the West Bengal unit of BJP Mahila Morcha, and as the General Secretary of Bharatiya Janata Party, West Bengal. Since January 2026, she serves as the Vice-President of the Bharatiya Janata Party, West Bengal. She is currently serving as the Cabinet Minister of Urban Development and Municipal Affairs forWest Bengal.

== Early life and Education ==
Agnimitra Paul was born in Asansol, West Bengal, into a family of doctors and academics. Her father, Ashok Roy, is a pediatrician. She was educated at Loreto Convent, Asansol, and then at Asansol Girls' College. She then completed her bachelor's degree in Botany (Hons.) from Banwarilal Bhalotia College, Asansol. Later, she earned an MBA from Jadavpur University. She also holds a diploma in Fashion Designing.

She is married to Partho Paul, an entrepreneur. They have two children.

== Fashion career ==
Paul as a fashion designer, designed clothes for several Bollywood films such as Koi Mere Dil Se Pooche and Via Darjeeling.

She has designed costumes and personal wardrobes for Mithun Chakraborthy, Sridevi, Esha Deol, Shonal Rawat, Kay Kay Menon, Sonali Kulkarni, Vinay Pathak and Parvin Dabas.

She started her own fashion label "Inga" across many cities in India. Paul also designed for the Lakme Fashion Week Summer/Resort 2013.

Former US Secretary of State Hillary Clinton was presented with shawls and blankets that Paul designed.

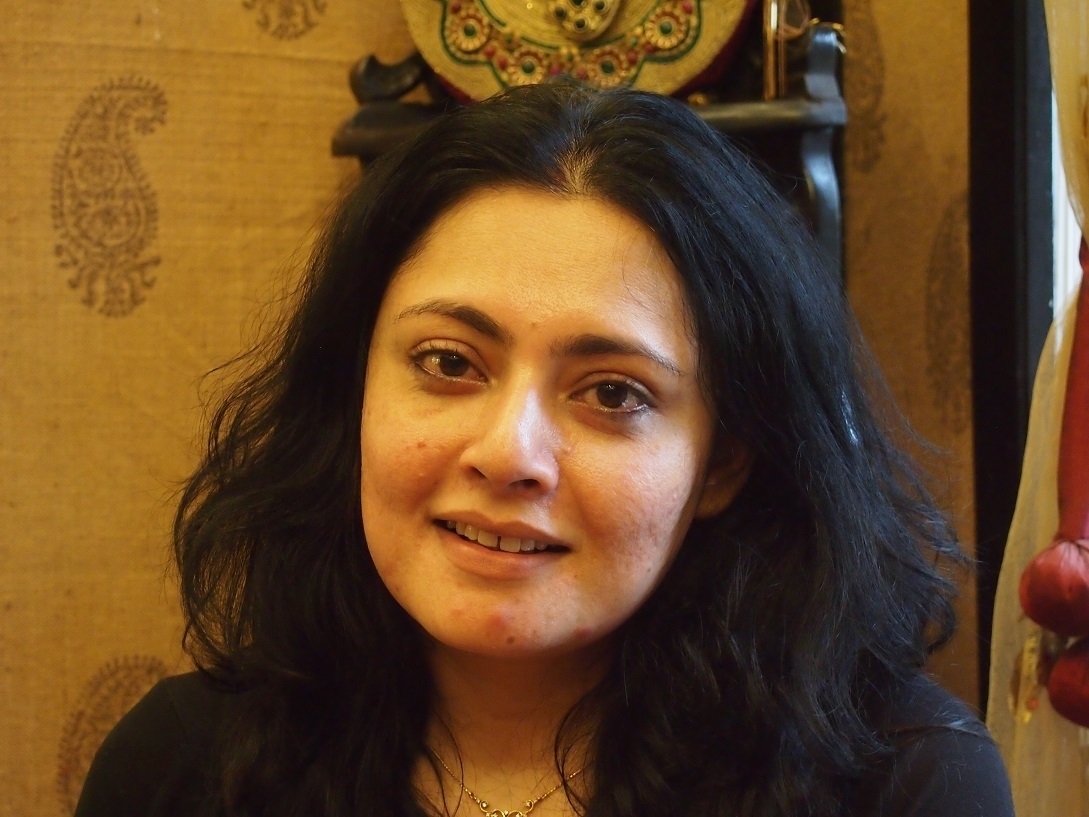
Paul in 2013

== Political career ==
Paul joined the Bharatiya Janata Party on 23 March 2019.

In 2020, Paul became the BJP Mahila Morcha president of West Bengal succeeding Locket Chatterjee. As the BJP Mahila Morcha president, she organised self-defence training workshop called "Uma" for women across 23 districts in the state. On 22 December 2021, she was appointed the General Secretary of the Bharatiya Janata Party, West Bengal and was succeeded by Tanuja Chakraborty as the President of the BJP Mahila Morcha.

She defeated TMC's Saayoni Ghosh in the 2021 West Bengal Legislative Assembly election from Asansol Dakshin Vidhan Sabha.

Paul contested in the 2022 Lok Sabha by-elections from the Asansol constituency but lost to actor-politician Shatrughan Sinha. Later she contested in the 2024 Indian general election in West Bengal from Medinipur constituency but lost to actor-politician June Malia.

On 7 January 2026, she was appointed the vice-president of the Bharatiya Janata Party, West Bengal. In 2026 West Bengal Legislative Assembly election, she retained the Asansol Dakshin Assembly constituency seat with a commanding margin of 40,839 votes against Trinamool Congress candidate Tapas Banerjee. Asansol North MLA, Agnimitra Paul, one of the prominent women faces of the BJP in West Bengal, has been entrusted with the Women and Child Welfare portfolio in the newly formed Bengal government led by Suvendu Adhikari. Her appointment is being seen as a strategic move by the BJP as it sharpens its focus on women-centric welfare, safety, and empowerment initiatives in Bengal.
