= Ratibati =

- Census Town
- Location in West Bengal, India Ratibati (India)
- Coordinates: 23.654125°N 87.040049°E
- Country: India
- State: West Bengal
- District: Paschim Bardhaman

Area
  - Total: 1.38 km^{2} (0.53 sq mi)

Population (2011)
  - Total: 4,508
  - Density: 3,270/km^{2} (8,460/sq mi)

Languages*
  - Official: Bengali, Hindi, English
- Time zone: UTC+5:30 (IST)
- PIN: 713339
- Telephone code: 0341
- Vehicle registration: WB
- Lok Sabha constituency: Asansol
- Vidhan Sabha constituency: Jamuria
- Website: paschimbardhaman.co.in

Ratibati is a census town in the Raniganj CD block in the Asansol Sadar subdivision of the Paschim Bardhaman district in the Indian state of West Bengal.

== Geography ==
Cities and towns in the eastern portion of Asansol Sadar subdivision in Paschim Bardhaman district
MC: Municipal Corporation, CT: census town, N: neighbourhood, R: rural centre
Owing to space constraints in the small map, the actual locations in a larger map may vary slightly

=== Location ===
Ratibati is located at 23°39′15″N 87°02′24″E.

The Asansol-Durgapur area is composed of undulating laterite soil. This area lies between the Damodar River and the Ajay River. The discovery of coal in the 18th century led to industrialisation of the area and most of the forests have been cleared.

Pangachhiya, Majiara, Bhanowara, Domohani, Charanpur (OG), Ratibati and Chelad form a cluster of census towns and an outgrowth on the northern and eastern sides of Asansol.

=== Urbanisation ===
According to the 2011 census, 83.33% of the population of Asansol Sadar subdivision was urban and 16.67% was rural. In 2015, the municipal areas of Kulti, Raniganj and Jamuria were included within the jurisdiction of Asansol Municipal Corporation. Asansol Sadar subdivision has 26 (+1 partly) Census Towns.(partly presented in the map alongside; all places marked on the map are linked in the full-screen map).

== Demographics ==
According to the 2011 Census of India, Ratibati had a total population of 4,508 of which 2,348 (52%) were males and 2,160 (48%) were females. Population in the age range 0–6 years was 542. The total number of literate persons in Ratibati was 2,827 (71.28% of the population over 6 years).

*For language details see Raniganj (community development block)#Language and religion

As of 2001 India census, Ratibati had a population of 4,370. Males constitute 55% of the population and females 45%. Ratibati has an average literacy rate of 56%, lower than the national average of 59.5%: male literacy is 67%, and female literacy is 44%. In Ratibati, 13% of the population is under 6 years of age.

== Infrastructure ==
According to the District Census Handbook 2011, Bardhaman, Ratibati covered an area of 1.38 km^{2}. Among the civic amenities, it had 4 km roads with covered drains, the protected water supply involved service reservoir, tap water from untreated sources. It had 359 domestic electric connections. Among the medical facilities, it had was 1 dispensary/ health centre. Among the educational facilities it had was 1 primary school, 3 middle schools, 2 secondary schools and 2 senior secondary schools.

== Economy ==
Ratibati is in the heart of the coal mining zone. It is under Satgram area of Eastern Coalfields Ltd., a subsidiary of Coal India Limited. The post office is located at Kalipahari, nearby.

Collieries in the Satgram Area of Eastern Coalfields are: Kalidaspur, J.K.Nagar, Satgram, Ratibati, Chapui Khas, Mithapur, Nimcha, Jemehari, Pure Searsole, Tirath, Kuardih, Ardragram OCP and Seetaldasji OCP.

== Education ==
Ratibati Hindi High School is a Hindi-medium coeducational institution established in 2003. It has facilities for teaching from class V to class X. The school has 10 computers, a library with 70 books and a playground.

== Healthcare ==
Medical facilities (hospitals and dispensaries) in the Satgram Area of ECL are available at Satgram Area Hospital (PO Devchandnagar) (with 30 beds), Satgram Project (PO Devchandnagar), Mithapur (PO Jamuria), Satgram Incline (PO Jamuria), Jamehari (PO Searsole Rajbari), JK Nagar (PO Bidhanbag), Nimcha (PO Nimcha), Amkola (PO Nimcha), Kalidaspur Project (PO Bhara Kalibari, Mejia), Jora Morh Colony (PO Bhara Kalibari, Mejia), Ratibati (PO Ratibati), Kuardih (PO Kalipahari), Chapui Khas (PO Chapui), Tirat (PO Kalipahari).
