= Firhad Hakim =

Indian politician (born 1959)

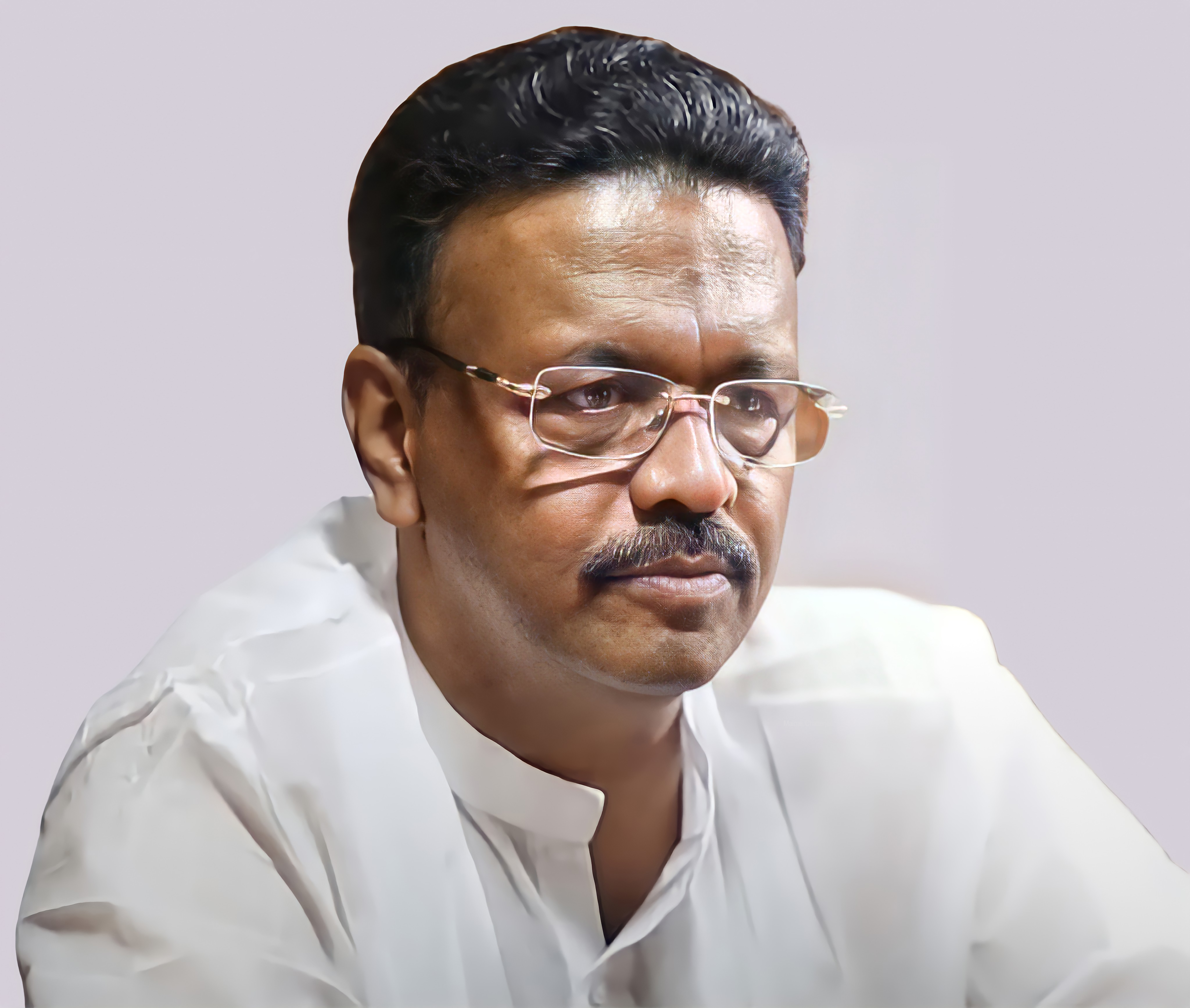
- Hakim in November 2020

38th Mayor of Kolkata
- In office 28 December 2021 – 5 June 2026
- Deputy: Atin Ghosh
- Preceded by: Himself (as Chairman of Board of Administrators)
- Succeeded by: TBD
- Constituency: Ward No. 82
- In office 3 December 2018 – 7 May 2020
- Deputy: Atin Ghosh
- Preceded by: Sovan Chatterjee
- Succeeded by: Himself (as Chairman of Board of Administrators)
- Constituency: Ward No. 82

Cabinet Minister Government of West Bengal
- In office 10 May 2021 – 7 May 2026
- Governor: Jagdeep Dhankhar; La. Ganesan (additional charge); C. V. Ananda Bose; R. N. Ravi
- Chief Minister: Mamata Banerjee
- Ministry and Departments: Urban Development and Municipal Affairs
- Preceded by: Suvendu Adhikari (Transport); Chandrima Bhattacharya (Housing)
- Succeeded by: Agnimitra Paul
- In office 20 May 2011 – 5 May 2021
- Governor: Jagdeep Dhankhar; Keshari Nath Tripathi
- Chief Minister: Mamata Banerjee
- Preceded by: Ashok Bhattacharya
- Succeeded by: Chandrima Bhattacharya

Member of the West Bengal Legislative Assembly
- Incumbent
- Assumed office 13 May 2011
- Preceded by: Constituency created
- Constituency: Kolkata Port
- In office 10 November 2009 – 13 May 2011
- Preceded by: Tapas Paul
- Succeeded by: Constituency Abolished
- Constituency: Alipore

Chairman of Board of Administrators, Kolkata Municipal Corporation
- In office 7 May 2020 – 24 December 2021
- Preceded by: Himself (as Mayor of Kolkata)
- Succeeded by: Himself (as Mayor of Kolkata)

Chairman of KMDA
- In office July 2021 – May 2026

Chairman of Borough IX, Kolkata Municipal Corporation
- In office 28 June 2005 – 19 May 2010
- Constituency: Ward No 82

Personal details
- Born: 1 January 1959 (age 67) Calcutta, West Bengal, India
- Party: Democratic Trinamool Congress
- Other political affiliations: Trinamool Congress (1998–2026); Indian National Congress (until 1998)
- Spouse: Ismat Hakim
- Children: 3
- Education: Heramba Chandra College (BCom)
- Other names: Bobby da

Firhad Hakim (born 1 January 1959) is an Indian politician who served as the 38th mayor of Kolkata from 2018 to 2026. He has served as the Cabinet Minister of Urban Development and Municipal Affairs and Housing in the Government of West Bengal. Hakim is an MLA of the Trinamool Congress party from the Kolkata Port constituency and a member of National Working Committee of All India Trinamool Congress.

Hakim was elected to the West Bengal Legislative Assembly in 2009. Two years later, he became a cabinet minister in the Mamata Banerjee ministry. In December 2018, he was appointed mayor after Sovan Chatterjee resigned.

Hakim resigned from his post as the mayor on 5 June 2026 amidst several political tensions within his party.

== Personal life ==
Hakim's grandfather migrated from the Gaya district of Bihar to Kolkata and started his business. His father, Abdul Hakim, was a law officer for the Kolkata Port Trust. He is married to Ismat Hakim. They have three daughters—Priyadarshini, Shabba and Afsha. They live in Chetla, a neighborhood of South Kolkata. He is nicknamed Bobby after the Australian cricketer Bobby Simpson.

Hakim graduated from Heramba Chandra College with a degree in commerce. He is the organizer-in-chief of the Chetla Agrani Durga Puja committee.

== Minister of West Bengal ==
In the late 1990s, Hakim was first elected as a councilor of the Kolkata Municipal Corporation. On 11 November 2009, he was elected to the West Bengal Legislative Assembly from the Alipore constituency after defeating Communist Party candidate, Kaustav Chatterjee by a margin of 27,555 votes in the by-poll.

In the 2011 West Bengal Legislative Assembly election, Hakim won from the Kolkata Port constituency as a candidate of the All India Trinamool Congress. He received 63,866 votes and defeated his nearest rival Moinuddin Shams of the All India Forward Bloc by a margin of 25,033 votes. Subsequently, he became the Minister of Urban Development and Municipal Affairs in the first Mamata Banerjee cabinet.

On 3 March 2013, the Ultadanga Flyover (located in East Kolkata) collapsed at 4:30 AM, well ahead of the rush-hour traffic. Three people were injured. Hakim blamed a crack that was detected in the flyover as a reason behind the collapse. He said that the problem was "not related to maintenance but a technical fault in the bolt system". In June 2014, he announced that 22 new municipalities would be created in West Bengal.

In the 2016 West Bengal Legislative Assembly election, Hakim defeated his nearest rival, Rakesh Singh of the Left Front-Indian National Congress alliance by a margin of 26,548 votes. On 16 June 2017, he was appointed chairman of the Tarakeswar Development Board.

== Mayor of Kolkata ==
On 20 November 2018, Sovan Chatterjee, then mayor of Kolkata, resigned as a cabinet minister. Two days later, he resigned from the post of the mayor of Kolkata. Subsequently, Trinamool Congress announced that Hakim would be their mayoral candidate. The state government passed the Kolkata Municipal Corporation (Second Amendment) Bill, 2018. This allows a candidate who is not a member of the Kolkata Municipal Corporation to be appointed mayor of the city, provided they are elected to the same within a period of six months.

On 28 November 2018, Hakim filed his nomination. The following day the Bharatiya Janata Party announced Mina Debi Purohit (former deputy mayor) as their mayoral candidate. He secured 121 votes while Purohit received five votes; Hakim was elected mayor. He became the first Muslim since the independence of India to be elected mayor of Kolkata.

On getting elected, Hakim said that "pollution and environment are two areas" on which he would like to work. He also set up a WhatsApp number, promising to act on complaints received on that mobile number. Making Kolkata cleaner and greener, ensuring a continuous supply of drinking water to the city, building toilets in slums and making the slums "model residential areas" were his priorities as mayor.

In January 2019, it was announced that Hakim would contest ward no. 82 of the Kolkata Municipal Corporation. In a by-election, he won the ward and defeated his nearest rival Jiban Sen of the Bharatiya Janata Party by a margin of 13,987 votes; Hakim received 16,564 votes. The term of the Kolkata Municipal Corporation expired on 7 May 2020, however due to the COVID-19 pandemic, elections couldn't be held on time to elect the new councillors of the KMC and was delayed. On 8 May 2020, Hakim was appointed as chairman of board of administrators of the Kolkata Municipal Corporation. He resigned as chairman of board of administrators of KMC on 22 March 2021 after the Election Commission of India (ECI) has restrained political appointees serving as board administrators of West Bengal municipal corporations, ahead of the 2021 West Bengal Legislative Assembly election. He was succeeded by IAS Khalil Ahmed.

Hakim resigned from the post Mayor of Kolkata on 5 June 2026.

== Controversies ==
=== Narada sting ===
In 2016, the Narada sting operation video was released in which Hakim was seen allegedly taking bribes. On 19 September 2017, he was questioned for eight hours by the Central Bureau of Investigation at Nizam Palace about the sting operation. Hakim said that the CBI probe was a "political conspiracy" against his party and that "he was not seen taking cash in any of the footage".

On 17 May 2021, he along with senior minister Subrata Mukherjee, MLA and former minister Madan Mitra and former Mayor of Kolkata Sovan Chatterjee had been arrested by Central Bureau of Investigation from their house in connection with the Narada sting operation.

=== Controversial remarks ===
Before the 2016 West Bengal Legislative Assembly election, Hakim, while speaking to Maleeha Hamid Sidiqqui of Pakistani newspaper Dawn, referred to his constituency as "mini-Pakistan". However, he denied making such a statement. He said "she (the Pakistani journalist) only asked me that this place looks like Karachi of Pakistan. I did not make any comment". He also said that he was "being targeted for being a Muslim and that it was a communal conspiracy".

At the time of 2021 West Bengal Assembly election, a video goes viral on social media, where Firhad Hakim is seen abusing India's central forces. In this context, the Election Commission made a show cause to Firhad Hakim. Although Firhad Hakim denies it.

In November 2024, while campaigning for Sheikh Rabiul Islam in the Haroa by-election, he allegedly made objectionable remarks about Rekha Patra, the BJP candidate and prominent advocate for the victims of the Sandeshkhali incident. His comments drew condemnation from Suvendu Adhikari, the Leader of the Opposition in the Legislative Assembly, who urged the National Commission for Women to take appropriate action.
