= Ananda Gopal Mukherjee =

Indian politician (1926–1989)

Ananda Gopal Mukhopadhyay

Member of Parliament, Lok Sabha
- In office 1980–1989
- Preceded by: Robin Sen
- Succeeded by: Haradhan Roy
- Constituency: Asansol

Member of West Bengal Legislative Assembly
- In office 1952–1957
- Preceded by: Constituency established
- Succeeded by: Kanailal Das
- Constituency: Ausgram
- In office 1957–1962
- Preceded by: Constituency established
- Succeeded by: Constituency abolished
- Constituency: Ondal
- In office 1962–1967
- Preceded by: Constituency established
- Succeeded by: Dilip Kumar Majumdar
- Constituency: Durgapur
- In office 1972–1977
- Preceded by: Dilip Kumar Majumdar
- Succeeded by: Constituency abolished
- Constituency: Durgapur

President of the West Bengal Pradesh Congress Committee
- In office 1981–1985
- Preceded by: Ajit Kumar Panja
- Succeeded by: Priya Ranjan Dasmunsi

Personal details
- Born: 27 November 1926 Bhiringi mouza, Durgapur, Bengal Presidency, British India (now West Bengal, India)
- Died: 1989 (aged 62–63) Durgapur, West Bengal, India
- Party: Indian National Congress
- Spouse: Anjali Mukhopadhyay
- Children: Apurba Mukhopadhyay
- Relatives: Anindita Mukherjee (Daughter in Law)
- Education: University of Calcutta

Ananda Gopal Mukhopadhyay (27 November 1926 – 1989), was an Indian politician from West Bengal who was affiliated with Indian National Congress.

== Early life ==
The son of Basanta Kumar Mukhopadhyay, he was born at Bhiringhi (now in Durgapur) on 27 November 1926. He graduated in science.

== Political career ==
In 1951 he was elected to the West Bengal Legislative Assembly (Vidhan Sabha) from Ausgram (Vidhan Sabha constituency). In 1957 he was elected from the Ondal constituency. In 1962 and 1972 he was elected from the then newly formed Durgapur constituency.

Ananda Gopal Mukhopadhayay was elected to the Indian Parliament (Lok Sabha) in 1980 and 1984, from Asansol (Lok Sabha constituency).

He was president, West Bengal Pradesh Congress Committee; member, INTUC Central Executive Committee; vice-president, Indian National Metal Workers' Federation (INTUC); president, All India National General Insurance Employees Association (INTUC); director, Durgapur Projects Ltd. and Durgapur Chemicals Ltd., 1972–76.
