= Robin Sen =

Indian politician (1923–1995)

Member of Parliament, Lok Sabha
- In office 1971–1980
- Preceded by: Deben Sen
- Succeeded by: Ananda Gopal Mukhopadhyay
- Constituency: Asansol, West Bengal

Personal details
- Born: March 1923 Senhati, Khulna District, Bengal Presidency, British India
- Died: 19 January 1995 (aged 71)
- Party: CPI(M)

Robin Sen (March 1923 – 19 January 1995) was an Indian politician belonging to the Communist Party of India (Marxist). He was elected to the Lok Sabha, lower house of the Parliament of India from Asansol in 1971 and 1977.

He started his career with the Royal Indian Air Force, from where he was dismissed because of his political activities in 1946. He joined the Bolshevik Leninist Party of India and moved from Kolkata to Raniganj in a bid to organize trade union movement among the workers. He was detained several times for political activism between 1963 and 1965. He joined the newly formed Communist Party of India (Marxist) in the sixties.

Sen died on 19 January 1995, at the age of 71.
