= Tapas Banerjee =

Indian politician

Member of the West Bengal Legislative Assembly
- In office 6 May 2021 – 4 May 2026
- Preceded by: Runu Dutta
- Succeeded by: Partha Ghosh
- Constituency: Raniganj
- In office 13 May 2011 – 4 May 2021
- Preceded by: Amitava Mukhopadhyay
- Succeeded by: Agnimitra Paul
- Constituency: Asansol Dakshin
- In office 1996–2001
- Preceded by: Goutam Roy Choudhury
- Succeeded by: Kalyan Banerjee
- Constituency: Asansol Uttar

Personal details
- Party: All India Trinamool Congress
- Education: B.Com & LLB
- Alma mater: University of Calcutta
- Profession: Politician, lawyer

Tapas Banerjee is an Indian advocate and politician from West Bengal belonging to All India Trinamool Congress. He was a member of the West Bengal Legislative Assembly representing Raniganj ( Vidhan Sabha constituency) from 2021 to 2026. Earlier he was a member of the West Bengal Legislative Assembly representing Asansol Dakshin (Vidhan Sabha constituency) from 2011 to 2021.

He graduated with B.Com. & LLB from University of Calcutta. He was elected as a member of the West Bengal Legislative Assembly from Asansol Dakshin in 2011 and 2016.

== Political career ==
Tapas Banerjee won Asansol Dakshin (Vidhan Sabha Constituency) in the 2011 assembly elections. Banerjee defeated his nearest contender, Ashok Kumar Mukherjee of CPI(M), with a margin of 28,541 votes. Banerjee received 89,645 votes, while the runner-up Mukherjee, got 61,104. The voter turnout in the election was 78.69%.

State Legislative Assembly
New seat	Member of the West Bengal Legislative Assembly from Asansol Dakshin Assembly constituency 2011–	Incumbent
