= Haradhan Roy =

Indian politician

Member of Parliament, Lok Sabha
- In office 1989-1998
- Preceded by: Ananda Gopal Mukhopadhyay
- Succeeded by: Bikash Chowdhury
- Constituency: Asansol, West Bengal

Member, West Bengal Legislative Assembly
- In office 1967-1987
- Preceded by: Lakhan Bagdi
- Succeeded by: Bansa Gopal Chowdhury
- Constituency: Raniganj, West Bengal

Personal details
- Born: 16 March 1926 Raniganj, Bardhaman district, Bengal Presidency, British India
- Party: CPI(M)

Haradhan Roy (born 16 March 1926, date of death unknown) was an Indian politician belonging to the Communist Party of India (Marxist). He was elected to the Lok Sabha, lower house of the Parliament of India from Asansol in 1989, 1991 and 1996 but later sidelined due to differences of opinion with CPI Marxist leadership and was denied a Lok Sabha ticket in 1998. Earlier he was member of the West Bengal Legislative Assembly. Roy is deceased.

As a parliamentarian, he repeatedly raised issues regarding the general infrastructure of the colliery belt, particularly the scenario of coalfields and demanded revival of public sector industries such as Hindustan Cables, IISCO Steel Plant.
