= Asansol Dakshin Assembly constituency =

West Bengal Legislative Assembly constituency

Asansol Dakshin
- Constituency No. 280 for the West Bengal Legislative Assembly
- Interactive Map Outlining Asansol Dakshin Assembly Constituency

Constituency details
- Country: India
- Region: East India
- State: West Bengal
- District: Paschim Bardhaman
- Lok Sabha constituency: Asansol
- Established: 1951
- Total electors: 234,863 (2026)
- Reservation: None

Member of Legislative Assembly
- 18th West Bengal Legislative Assembly
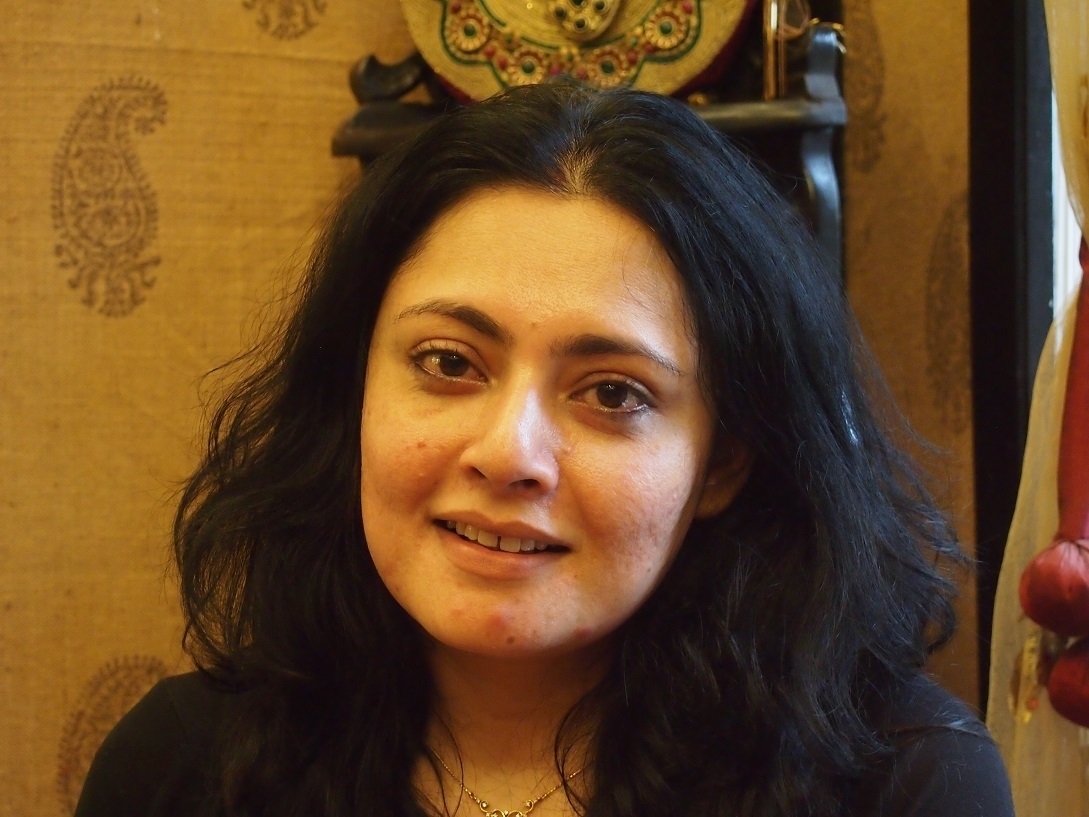
- Incumbent Agnimitra Paul
- Party: BJP
- Elected year: 2026
- Preceded by: Tapas Banerjee

Asansol Dakshin Assembly constituency is an assembly constituency in Paschim Bardhaman district in the Indian state of West Bengal.

== Overview ==
As per orders of the Delimitation Commission, No. 280 Asansol Dakshin Assembly constituency covers Ward nos. 38-39, 56-57, 75, 77-87, 94-98, 106 of Asansol Municipal Corporation and Amrasota, Egara, Ballavpur, Jemari and Tirat gram panchayats of Raniganj CD Block.

Asansol Dakshin assembly segment is part of No. 40 Asansol (Lok Sabha constituency).

== Members of the Legislative Assembly ==
Year	Member	Party
Asansol
1951	Atindra Nath Bose	All India Forward Bloc (Ruikar)
1957	Shibdas Ghatak	Indian National Congress
1962	Bijoy Pal	Communist Party of India
1967	Dr. Gopika Ranjan Mitra	Indian National Congress
1969	Lokesh Ghosh	Communist Party of India (Marxist)
1971	Lokesh Ghosh	Communist Party of India (Marxist)
1972	Niranjan Dihidar	Communist Party of India
1977	Haradhan Roy	Communist Party of India (Marxist)
1982	Bijoy Pal	Communist Party of India (Marxist)
1987	Prabuddha Laha	Indian National Congress
1991	Goutam Roy Choudhury	Communist Party of India (Marxist)
1996	Tapas Banerjee	Indian National Congress
2001	Kalyan Banerjee	Trinamool Congress
2006	Prativa Ranjan Mukherjee	Communist Party of India (Marxist)
Asansol Dakshin
2011	Tapas Banerjee	Trinamool Congress
2016	Tapas Banerjee	Trinamool Congress
2021	Agnimitra Paul	Bharatiya Janata Party
2026	Agnimitra Paul	Bharatiya Janata Party

== Election results ==
=== 2026 ===
2026 West Bengal Legislative Assembly election: Asansol Dakshin
Party	Candidate	Votes	%	±%
BJP	Agnimitra Paul	119,582	55.42	▲10.29
AITC	Tapas Banerjee	78,743	36.49	▼6.33
CPI(M)	Shilpi Chakraborty	10,390	4.81	▼3.39
NOTA	None of the above	2,857	1.32	▼0.46
Majority		40,839	18.93	▲16.62
Turnout		215,792	90.14	▲19.13
BJP hold		Swing		

=== 2021 ===
2021 West Bengal Legislative Assembly election: Asansol Dakshin
Party	Candidate	Votes	%	±%
BJP	Agnimitra Paul	87,881	45.13	+18.62
AITC	Saayoni Ghosh	83,394	42.82	+4.28
CPI(M)	Prashanta Ghosh	15,972	8.2	−22.64
BSP	Singhasan Paswan	2,867	1.47	
NOTA	None of the above	3,466	1.78	
Majority		4,487	2.31	
Turnout		194,737	71.01	
BJP gain from AITC		Swing		

=== 2016 ===
2016 West Bengal Legislative Assembly election: Asansol Dakshin
Party	Candidate	Votes	%	±%
AITC	Tapas Banerjee	71,515	38.54	−17.21
CPI(M)	Hemant Prabhakar	57,232	30.84	−7.16
BJP	Diptansu Choudhury	49,199	26.51	+22.34
BMP	Chhoton Ruidas	2,096	1.12	N/A
NOTA	None of the above	3,911	2.10	N/A
Majority		14,283	7.70	−10.05
Turnout		1,85,704	75.07	
AITC hold		Swing	-5.03	
