= Kulti Assembly constituency =

Kulti
- Constituency No. 282 for the West Bengal Legislative Assembly
- Interactive Map Outlining Kulti Assembly Constituency

Constituency details
- Country: India
- Region: East India
- State: West Bengal
- District: Paschim Bardhaman
- Lok Sabha constituency: Asansol
- Established: 1951
- Total electors: 187,505
- Reservation: None

Member of Legislative Assembly
- 18th West Bengal Legislative Assembly
- Incumbent Ajay Kumar Poddar
- Party: BJP
- Alliance: NDA
- Elected year: 2026

Kulti Assembly constituency is an assembly constituency in Paschim Bardhaman district in the Indian state of West Bengal.

== Overview ==
As per orders of the Delimitation Commission, No. 282 Kulti assembly constituency covers Wards nos. 16-19, 58-74, 99-105 of Asansol Municipal Corporation.

Kulti assembly segment is part of No. 40 Asansol (Lok Sabha constituency).

== Members of the Legislative Assembly ==
Year	Name	Party
1951	Baidyanath Mandal	Indian National Congress
1951	Joy Narayan Sarma	Indian National Congress
1957	Benarashi Prosad Jha	Praja Socialist Party
1962	Jaynarayan Sharma	Indian National Congress
1967	Jaynarayan Sharma	Indian National Congress
1969	Taraknath Chakraborty	Samyukta Socialist Party
1971	Ramdas Banerjee	Indian National Congress
1972	Ramdas Banerjee	Indian National Congress
1977	Madhu Banerjee	Marxist Forward Bloc
1982	Madhu Banerjee	Forward Bloc
1987	Tuhin Samanta	Indian National Congress
1991	Maniklal Acharya	Forward Bloc
1996	Maniklal Acharya	Forward Bloc
2001	Maniklal Acharya	Forward Bloc
2006	Ujjal Chatterjee	All India Trinamool Congress
2011	Ujjal Chatterjee	All India Trinamool Congress
2016	Ujjal Chatterjee	All India Trinamool Congress
2021	Dr. Ajay Kumar Poddar	Bharatiya Janata Party
2026	Dr. Ajay Kumar Poddar	Bharatiya Janata Party

== Election results ==
=== 2026 ===
2026 West Bengal Legislative Assembly election: Kulti
Party	Candidate	Votes	%	±%
BJP	Ajay Kumar Poddar	103,570	54.44	+8.03
AITC	Abhijit Ghatak	77,072	40.51	−5.51
AIFB	Bhabani Acharya	3,937	2.07	
NOTA	None of the above	2,539	1.33	−0.7
Majority		26,498	13.93	+13.54
Turnout		190,239	90.2	+20.76
BJP hold		Swing		

=== 2021 ===
*The Congress party had an alliance with CPI(M)

2021 West Bengal Legislative Assembly election: Kulti
Party	Candidate	Votes	%	±%
BJP	Ajay Kumar Poddar	81,112	46.41	
AITC	Ujjal Chatterjee	80,433	46.02	
INC	Chandi Das Chatterjee	5,795	3.32	
Independent	Suraj Kewat	2,003	1.15	
NOTA	None of the above	3,553	2.03	
Majority		679	0.39	
Turnout		174,767	69.44	
BJP gain from AITC		Swing		

=== 2016 ===
2016 West Bengal Legislative Assembly election: Kulti
Party	Candidate	Votes	%	±%
AITC	Ujjal Chatterjee	68,952	40.81	▼15.28
BJP	Ajay Kumar Poddar	49,464	29.28	▲25.18
INC	Abhijit Acharyya (Bappa)	42,895	25.39	▲25.39
JMM	Shakil Ansari	1,896	1.12	
NOTA	None of the above	2,848	1.69	
Majority		19,488	11.53	
Turnout		1,68,994	73.36	
AITC hold		Swing		

=== 2011 ===
In the 2011 election, Ujjal Chatterjee of Trinamool Congress defeated his nearest rival Maniklal Acharya of AIFB.

2011 West Bengal Legislative Assembly election: Kulti
Party	Candidate	Votes	%	±%
AITC	Ujjal Chatterjee	77,610	56.09	−0.38#
AIFB	Maniklal Acharya	49,044	35.45	−6.22
BJP	Vivekananda Bhattacharya	5,666	4.10	
JD(U)	Subhas Singh	3,567	2.58	
JMM	Singrai Marandi	2,468	1.78	
Majority		28,566	20.65	
Turnout		1,38,470	73.66	
AITC hold		Swing	+5.94#	

.# Swing calculated on Congress+Trinamool Congress vote percentages in 2006 taken together.

=== 2006 ===
Ujjal Chatterjee of Trinamool Congress won the Kulti assembly seat in 2006. Maniklal Acharya of Forward Bloc won the seat in 2001. Prior to that the seat was won by Maniklal Acharjee of Forward Bloc in 1996 and 1991, Tuhin Samanta of Congress in 1987, Madhu Banerjee of Forward Bloc in 1982 and 1977.

=== 1977 ===
Ramdas Banerjee of Congress won in 1972 and 1971, Dr. Taraknath Chakrabarti of Samyukta Socialist Party won in 1969, Dr. Jai Narayan Sharma of Congress in 1967 and 1962, Benarasi Prasad Jha of PSP in 1957. In 1952, independent India's first election, Kulti was a twin member constituency and those elected were Jai Narayan Sharma and Baidyanath Mondal, both of Congress.
