= Heramba Chandra College =

Undergraduate college in Kolkata, West Bengal, India

- Type: Undergraduate college
- Established: 6 January 1879; 147 years ago
- Accreditation: B++ NAAC
- Affiliations: University of Calcutta
- Principal: Dr. Nabanita Chakrabarti
- Location: Kolkata, West Bengal, India; 22°30′55.87″N 88°22′5.47″E
- Campus: Urban
- Website: http://www.herambachandracollege.ac.in/
- Location within Kolkata Location within India

Heramba Chandra College is popularly known as South City Day, is an undergraduate college in Kolkata, West Bengal. It shares premises with Sivanath Sastri College (popularly known as South City Morning) and Prafulla Chandra College (popularly known as South City Evening).

The College specialises in Commerce related studies and widely known as one of the best government colleges for undergraduate programme in West Bengal. The College is affiliated to the University of Calcutta.

== History ==
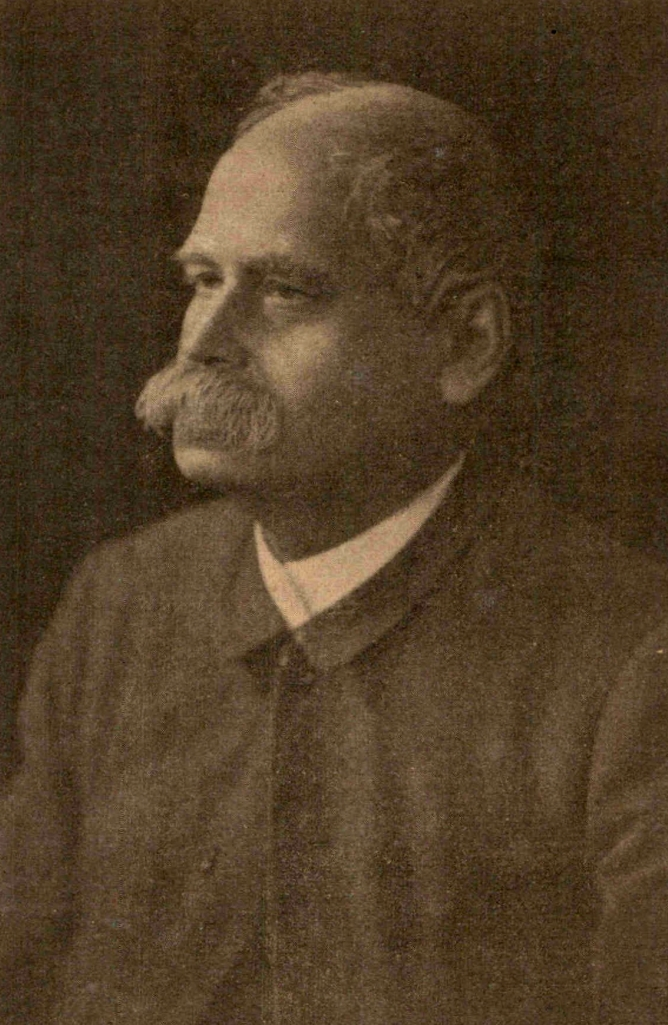
Heramba Chandra Maitra

Heramba Changra College opened on 6th January 1879.

In 1881, only two years after its establishment, the City School was raised to the rank of a College when F.A. classes were started. Since then, the college made rapid strides towards the advancement of higher education. The B.A. classes were opened in 1884 and thus, within five years of its establishment, the institution developed into a first-grade college. In 1885, a Law Department for teaching up to the B.L standard was added. The college was first established in an old house. After a short while, that house at 13, Mirzapur Street (now Surya Sen Street) was purchased for the City College.

For some years, teaching up to the M.A standard was done in the City College. But the M.A. classes had to be abolished when the new regulations of Calcutta University came into force. In January 1905, the college was placed under the control of a society registered under Act XXI of 1860 and called the City College Institution, which is now known as Brahmo Samaj Education Society. Their objective is "to promote the cause of education - comprehending the mind, heart and body and founded on a Theistic basis to conduce to the good of man and the glory of God."

To meet the growing need of the students a new commodious building was erected in 1917 at Amherst Street now, Raja Rammohan Sarani, Kolkata on a plot of land measuring three bighas and six cottahs. Presently Heramba Chandra College is situated at 23/49, Gariahat Road. (lat=22.5155402N and long=88.3684176E) which is near to the Rabindra Sarobar lake. The college has a commerce Lab which is the first commerce lab in West Bengal. the college has two well stocked library

== Notable alumni ==
- Jisshu Sengupta, Indian Film actor
- Rohan Banerjee, cricketer
- Sanju Sivram, Malayalam Film actor
- Firhad Hakim, politician
- Koushani Mukherjee, Actress
- Prosit Roy, Filmmmker

== See also ==
- List of colleges affiliated to the University of Calcutta
- Education in India
- Education in West Bengal
