= Runu Dutta =

Indian politician

Runu Dutta (born 2 Feburary1954) is an Indian politician from West Bengal. He is a former member of the West Bengal Legislative Assembly from Raniganj Assembly constituency in Bardhaman district. He won the 2016 West Bengal Legislative Assembly election representing the Communist Party of India (Marxist).

== Early life and education ==
Dutta is from Raniganj, Bardhaman district, West Bengal and his father was Sunil Dutta. He studied Class 12 and passed the higher secondary examinations. He later discontinued his studies. He is a retired primary school teacher.

== Career ==
Dutta won from Raniganj Assembly constituency representing the Communist Party of India (Marxist) in the 2016 West Bengal Legislative Assembly election. He polled 74,995 votes and defeated his nearest rival, Bano Nargis of the All India Trinamool Congress, by a margin of 12,385 votes. Earlier in the 2011 West Bengal Legislative Assembly election, he contested on CPI (M) ticket but lost to Md. Sohrab Ali of the All India Trinamool Congress by a margin of 1,751 votes.
