= Bijan Mukherjee =

Indian politician (born 1984)

Bijan Mukherjee (born 1984) is an Indian politician from West Bengal. He is a member of West Bengal Legislative Assembly from the Jamuria Assembly constituency in Paschim Bardhaman district representing the Bharatiya Janata Party.

== Early life ==
Mukherjee is from Jamuria, Paschim Bardhaman district, West Bengal. He is the son of the late Dilip Kumar Mukhopadhyay. He completed his Master of Surgery, Gynaecology from Dr. NTR University of Health Sciences in 2014. He is a medical practitioner and his wife is an assistant professor. He declared assets worth Rs.3 crore in his affidavit to the Election Commission of India. He had no criminal cases registered against him as of May 2026.

== Career ==
Mukherjee won the Jamuria Assembly constituency representing the Bharatiya Janata Party in the 2026 West Bengal Legislative Assembly election. He polled votes and defeated his nearest rival, Hareram Singh of the All India Trinamool Congress, by a margin of 22,514 votes.
