= Arijit Roy =

Indian politician in West Bengal

- অরিজিৎ রায়

Member of the West Bengal Legislative Assembly
- Incumbent
- Assumed office 4 May 2026
- Preceded by: Bidhan Upadhyay
- Constituency: Barabani

Personal details
- Born: 19 October 1991 (age 34) Asansol, Paschim Bardhaman, West Bengal 713341
- Party: Bharatiya Janata Party
- Parent: Amal Roy
- Education: NIOS; Binod Bihari Mahto Koyalanchal University
- Occupation: Businessman
- Profession: Politician

Arijit Roy (born 19 october 1991) is an Indian politician from West Bengal. He is a member of West Bengal Legislative Assembly, from Barabani Assembly constituency. He is a member of Bharatiya Janata Party.

== Early life and education ==
Roy hails from Paschim Bardhaman district of West Bengal. He has done Bachelor of Arts from Netaji Subhas Open University in the year 2017 and Bachelor of Law (LL.B.) from Binod Bihari Mahto Koyalanchal University in the year 2025.

== Political career ==
He is a member of West Bengal Legislative Assembly, from Barabani Assembly constituency.

== Electoral performance ==
West Bengal Legislative Assembly
Year	Constituency	Party	Votes	%	Opponent	Party	Votes	%	Margin	Result
2026	Barabani	BJP	91,777	49.54	Bidhan Upadhyay	AITC	80,055	43.21	11722	Won

== See also ==
- 2026 West Bengal Legislative Assembly election
- List of chief ministers of West Bengal
