= Alipore Assembly constituency =

Former West Bengal Legislative Assembly Constituency

Coordinates: 22.53°N 88.33°E

Alipore
- Former constituency No. 148 for the West Bengal Legislative Assembly

Constituency details
- Country: India
- Region: East India
- State: West Bengal
- District: South 24 Parganas
- Lok Sabha constituency: Kolkata Dakshin
- Established: 1951
- Abolished: 2011
- Reservation: None

Alipore Assembly constituency was a Legislative Assembly constituency of South 24 Parganas district in the Indian state of West Bengal.

== Overview ==
As a consequence of the orders of the Delimitation Commission, Alipore Assembly constituency ceases to exist from 2011. Alipore Assembly Constituency was consisted of Ward Nos. 74 and 82 of the Kolkata Municipal Corporation

It was part of Kolkata Dakshin (Lok Sabha constituency),

Around half of the electorate of the constituency were slum dwellers.

== Members of the Legislative Assembly ==
Year	Member	Party
1951	Satyendra Kumar Basu	Indian National Congress
1957	Somnath Lahiri	Communist Party of India
1962	Somnath Lahiri	Communist Party of India
1967	Mani Sanyal	Communist Party of India
1969	Mani Sanyal	Communist Party of India
1971	Kanailal Sarkar	Indian National Congress
1972	Kanailal Sarkar	Indian National Congress
1977	Ashoke Kumar Bose	Communist Party of India (Marxist)
1982	Anup Kumar Chandra	Indian National Congress
1987	Saugata Roy	Indian National Congress
1991	Saugata Roy	Indian National Congress
1996	Saugata Roy	Indian National Congress
2001	Tapas Paul	Trinamool Congress
2006	Tapas Paul	Trinamool Congress
2009^	Firhad Hakim	Trinamool Congress

- ^ denotes by-election

== Election results ==
=== 2009 Bye-election ===
A bye-election was held on 10 November 2009 following the resignation of the sitting MLA, Tapas Paul who was elected as MP In Parliament from Krishnanagar (Lok Sabha constituency). Firhad Hakim of Trinamool Congress Defeated Kaustav Chatterjee of CPIM.

West Bengal state assembly bye election, 2009: Alipore constituency
Party	Candidate	Votes	%	±%
AITC	Firhad Hakim	41,635		
CPI(M)	Kaustav Chatterjee	14,080		
Majority		27,555		
Turnout		55,745		
AITC hold		Swing		

=== 2006 ===
In the 2006 election, Tapas Paul of Trinamool Congress defeated his nearest rival Biplab Chatterjee of CPI(M).

West Bengal assembly elections, 2006: Alipore constituency
Party	Candidate	Votes	%	±%
AITC	Tapas Paul	37,440	52.18	
CPI(M)	Biplab Chatterjee	26,138	36.43	
INC	Biswajit Deb	5,885	8.20	
Independent	Prasanta Kumar Maity	578	0.81	
BSP	Suresh Kumar Biswas	484	0.67	
Independent	Ajoy Kumar Das	408	0.57	
Independent	Ashim Saha	259	0.36	
Independent	Amarendra Nath Ghosh	219	0.31	
Independent	Murari Mohan Ghosh	187	0.26	
Independent	Deb Kumar Das	148	0.21	
Majority		11,302		
Turnout		71,746	60.27	
AITC hold		Swing	+12.98	

=== 1977-2009 ===
In the 2009 by-election, Firhad Hakim (Bobby) of Trinamool Congress won the 148 Alipore assembly seat. The by-election was necessitated by the election of sitting MLA, Tapas Paul, to the Lok Sabha from the Krishnanagar (Lok Sabha constituency). In 2006 and 2001 elections to the state assembly, Tapas Paul of Trinamool Congress won the seat defeating his nearest rivals Biplab Chatterjee and Mira Bhowmick respectively, both of CPI(M). Saugata Roy of Congress defeated Rathindranath Roy Choudhury of CPI(M) in 1996, Tarhin Roy Choudhury of CPI(M) in 1991, and Ashoke Bose of CPI(M) in 1987. Anup Kumar Chandra of Congress defeated Ashok Kumar Bose of CPI(M) in 1982. Ashoke Kumar Bose of CPI(M) defeated Salai Baran Chatterjee of Janata Party in 1977.

=== 1951-1972 ===
Kanailal Sarkar of Congress won in 1972 and 1971. Mani Sanyal of CPI won in 1969 and 1967. Somnath Lahiri of CPI won in 1962 and 1957. In independent India's first election in 1951, Satendra Kumar Basu of Congress won the Alipur seat.
