= Manik Upadhyay =

Indian politician

Manik Upadhay

MLA of Barabani
- In office 1988–1991
- Preceded by: Ajit Kumar Chakrabarty
- In office 1996–2006
- Preceded by: S. R. Das
- Succeeded by: Dilip Sarkar

Personal details
- Party: Trinamool Congress

Manik Upadhyay was an Indian politician belonging to Trinamool Congress. He was elected as MLA of Barabani in 1988, 1996 and 2001. His son Bidhan Upadhyay is two term legislator of West Bengal Legislative Assembly.
