= Partha Ghosh (politician) =

Indian politician (born 1979)

Partha Ghosh (born 1979) is an Indian politician from West Bengal. He is a member of West Bengal Legislative Assembly from the Raniganj Assembly constituency in Paschim Bardhaman district representing the Bharatiya Janata Party.

== Early life and education ==
Ghosh is from Raniganj, Paschim Bardhaman district, West Bengal. He is the son of the late Subrata Ghosh. He completed his Master of Law at O.P. Jindal Global University in 2022 and his LLB at Kolkata University in 2002. He is an advocate. He declared assets worth Rs.17 crore in his affidavit to the Election Commission of India.

== Career ==
Ghosh won the Raniganj Assembly constituency representing the Bharatiya Janata Party in the 2026 West Bengal Legislative Assembly election. He polled 97,416 votes and defeated his nearest rival, Kalobaran Mondal of the All India Trinamool Congress (AITC), by a margin of 17,786 votes.
