= Ujjal Chatterjee =

Indian politician

Ujjal Chatterjee (born 1959) is an Indian politician from West Bengal. He is a former member of the West Bengal Legislative Assembly from Kulti Assembly constituency in Paschim Bardhaman district. He won the 2016 West Bengal Legislative Assembly election representing the All India Trinamool Congress.

== Early life and education ==
Chatterjee is from Kulti, Paschim Bardhaman district, West Bengal. He is the son of late Umapada Chatterjee. He completed his BCom at a college affiliated with the University of Burdwan in 1980. His wife used to run her own business.

== Career ==
Chatterjee was first elected as an MLA when he won the 2006 West Bengal Legislative Assembly election from Kulti Assembly constituency representing the All India Trinamool Congress. He retained the seat for the Trinamool Congress winning the 2011 West Bengal Legislative Assembly election and was elected for a third time in the 2016 West Bengal Legislative Assembly election. In the 2021 Assembly election, he lost to Ajay Kumar Poddar of the Bharatiya Janata Party. In 2011, he polled 77,610 votes and defeated his nearest rival, Maniklal Acharya of the All India Forward Bloc, by a margin of 28,566 votes. In 2016, he polled 68,952 votes and defeated his closest opponent, Ajay Kumar Poddar of the Bharatiya Janata Party, by a margin of 19,488 votes. He lost the 2021 poll to Poddar of the BJP by a margin of 679 votes.
