= Pelab Kabi =

Indian politician (died 2020)

West Bengal Legislative Assembly
- In office 1996–2006
- Preceded by: Bikash Chowdhury
- Succeeded by: Dhirajlal Hazra
- Constituency: Jamuria

Personal details
- Born: 1935/1936
- Died: 3 January 2020 (aged 84) Jamuria, India
- Party: Communist Party of India (Marxist)

Pelab Kabi (1935/1936 – 3 January 2020) was an Indian politician from West Bengal belonging to Communist Party of India. He was a legislator of the West Bengal Legislative Assembly.

== Biography ==
Kabi was elected as a member of the West Bengal legislative assembly from Jamuria in 1996. He was also elected from Jamuria in 2001.
