= Raniganj Girls' College =

College in West Bengal

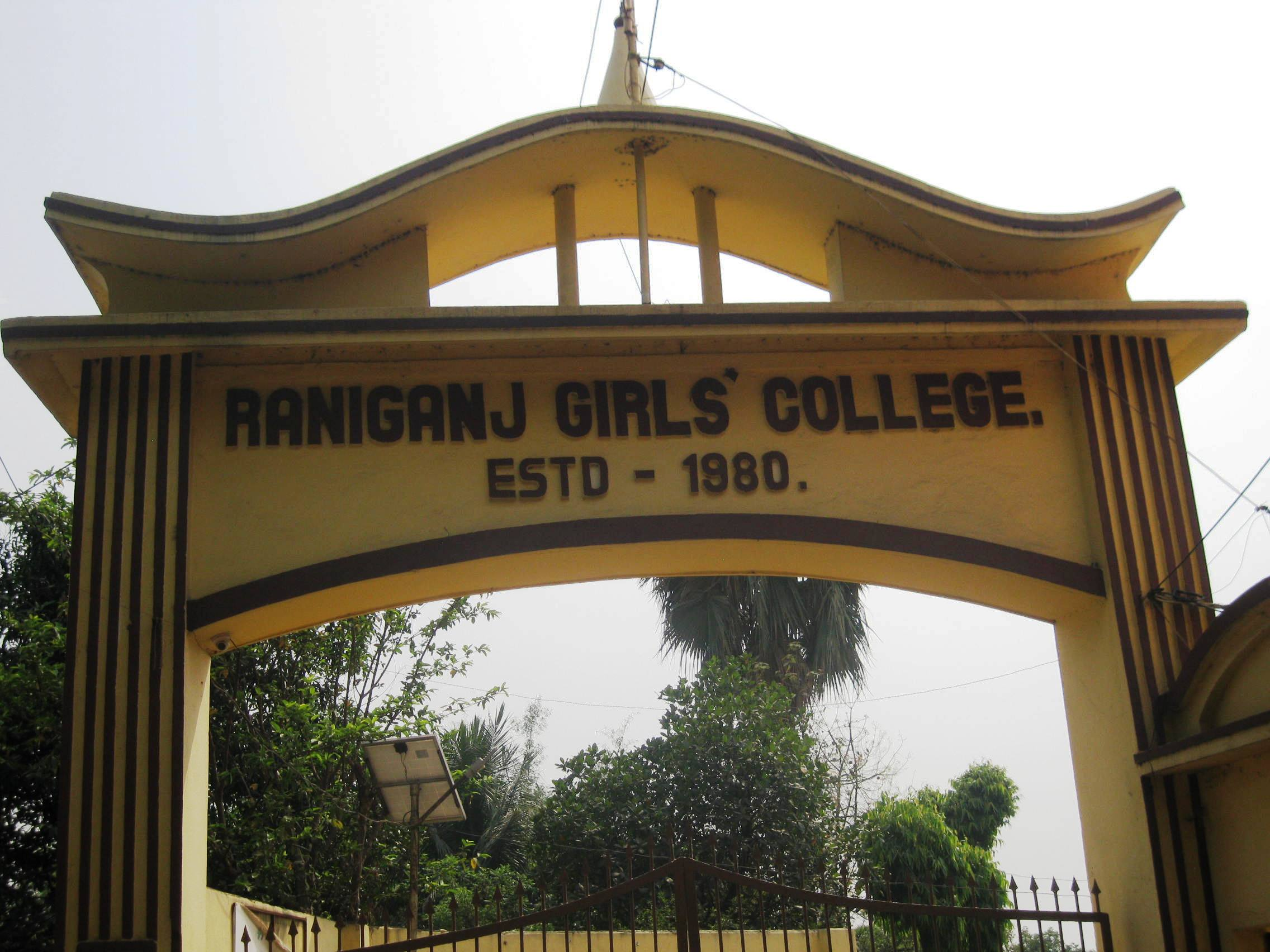
- Raniganj Girls' College main gate
- Type: Undergraduate college Public college
- Established: 1980; 46 years ago
- Accreditation: NAAC
- Academic affiliations: Kazi Nazrul University
- Teacher-in-charge: Dr. Anita Mishra
- Location: Searsole Rajbari, Raniganj, Asansol, West Bengal, 713358, India; 23.6298316°N 87.109736°E
- Campus: Urban
- Website: https://www.raniganjgirlscollege.org/

- Location within West Bengal Location within India

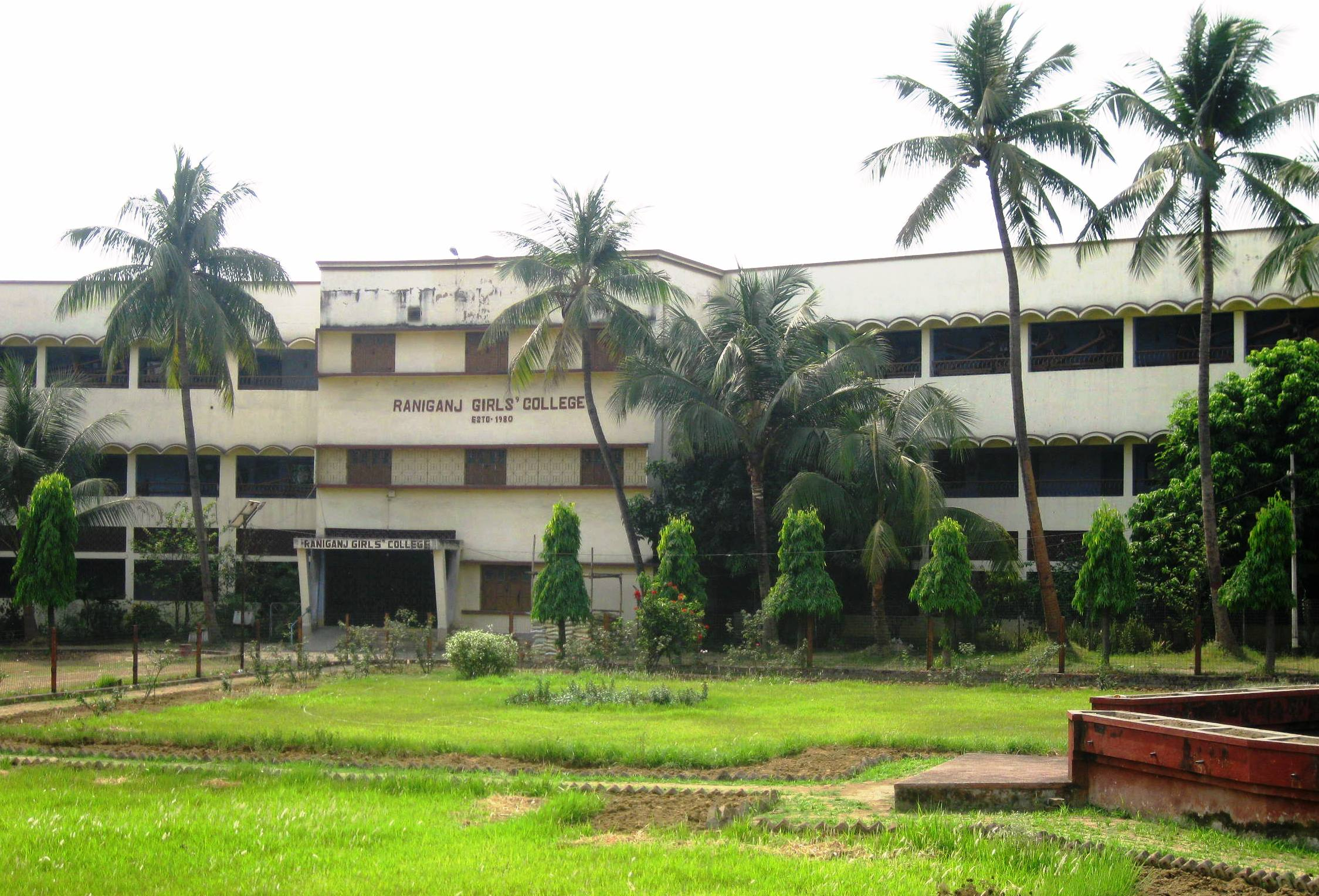
Raniganj Girls' College main buildings

Raniganj Girls' College, established in 1980, is a college for girl students at Raniganj in Asansol, Paschim Bardhaman district. It offers undergraduate courses in arts, commerce and science. It is affiliated to Kazi Nazrul University, Asansol. The college is recognized by the University Grants Commission (UGC) under sections 2F and 12B of the UGC Act 1956.

== Departments ==
=== Science ===
- Chemistry
- Physics
- Mathematics
- Botany
- Zoology
- Microbiology
- Geography
- Economics
- Nutrition
- Psychology
- Physical Education

=== Arts ===
- Bengali
- English
- Education
- Santhali
- History
- Political Science
- Philosophy
- Sociology
- Sanskrit
- Hindi
- Urdu (Post Graduate Department)

=== Performing Arts ===
- Classical Vocal
- Nazrulgeeti

=== Commerce ===
- Commerce
- Economics
- Accountancy
- Finance
- Taxation

== Accreditation ==
Raniganj Girls' College is accredited by the National Assessment and Accreditation Council (NAAC), Bangalore as a B+ category institution. The first cycle of assessment and accreditation was done by NAAC in September 2016.

== Notable alumni ==
- Jahanara Khan (born 1967), politician

== See also ==
- List of institutions of higher education in West Bengal
- Education in India
- Education in West Bengal
