= Jamuria Assembly constituency =

Jamuria
- Constituency No. 279 for the West Bengal Legislative Assembly
- Interactive Map Outlining Jamuria Assembly Constituency

Constituency details
- Country: India
- Region: East India
- State: West Bengal
- District: Paschim Bardhaman
- Lok Sabha constituency: Asansol
- Established: 1957
- Total electors: 175,237
- Reservation: None

Member of Legislative Assembly
- 18th West Bengal Legislative Assembly
- Incumbent Bijan Mukherjee
- Party: Bharatiya Janata Party
- Elected year: 2026

Jamuria Assembly constituency is an assembly constituency in Paschim Bardhaman district in the Indian state of West Bengal.

== Overview ==
As per orders of the Delimitation Commission, No. 279 Jamuria assembly constituency covers Wards nos. 1–12, 32 of Asansol Municipal Corporation, Jamuria CD Block, and Ratibati gram panchayat of Raniganj CD Block

Jamuria assembly segment is part of No. 40 Asansol (Lok Sabha constituency).

== Members of the Legislative Assembly ==
Year	Name	Party
1957	Amarendra Mondal	Praja Socialist Party
1962	Amarendra Mondal	Indian National Congress
1967	Tinkori Mondal	Samyukta Socialist Party
1969	Amarendra Mondal	Indian National Congress
1971	Durgadas Mondal	Communist Party of India (Marxist)
1972	Amarendra Mondal	Indian National Congress
1977	Bikash Chowdhury	Communist Party of India (Marxist)
1982	Bikash Chowdhury	Communist Party of India (Marxist)
1987	Bikash Chowdhury	Communist Party of India (Marxist)
1991	Bikash Chowdhury	Communist Party of India (Marxist)
1996	Pelab Kabi	Communist Party of India (Marxist)
2001	Pelab Kabi	Communist Party of India (Marxist)
2006	Dhirajlal Hazra	Communist Party of India (Marxist)
2011	Jahanara Khan	Communist Party of India (Marxist)
2016	Jahanara Khan	Communist Party of India (Marxist)
2021	Hareram Singh	All India Trinamool Congress
2026	Bijan Mukherjee	Bharatiya Janata Party

== Election results ==
=== 2026 ===
2026 West Bengal Legislative Assembly election: Jamuria
Party	Candidate	Votes	%	±%
BJP	Bijan Mukherjee	90,150	49.64	+11.88
AITC	Hareram Singh	67,636	37.25	−5.34
CPI(M)	Md. Sabbir Hussain	15,195	8.37	−6.52
INC	Tarun Kumar Ganguli	1,961	1.08	
NOTA	None of the above	1,701	0.94	−0.47
Majority		22,514	12.39	+7.56
Turnout		181,594	92.33	+17.04
BJP gain from AITC		Swing		

=== 2021 ===
2021 West Bengal Legislative Assembly election: Jamuria
Party	Candidate	Votes	%	±%
AITC	Hareram Singh	71,002	42.59	
BJP	Tapas Kumar Roy	62,951	37.76	
CPI(M)	Aishe Ghosh	24,818	14.89	
BSP	Bhanu Pratap Sharma	2,409	1.45	
BMP	Lakhiram Hansda	1,686	1.01	
NOTA	None of the above	2,353	1.41	
Majority		8,051	4.83	
Turnout		166,703	75.29	
AITC gain from CPI(M)		Swing		

=== 2016 ===
2016 West Bengal Legislative Assembly election: Jamuria
Party	Candidate	Votes	%	±%
CPI(M)	Jahanara Khan	67,214	43.28	−9.54
AITC	V. Sivadasan (Dasu)	59,457	38.29	−4.41
BJP	Santosh Singh	22,040	14.19	+9.71
NOTA	None of the above	3,018	1.94	+1.94
Majority		7,757	5.00	
Turnout		1,55,401	78.05	
CPI(M) hold		Swing		

=== 2011 ===
2011 West Bengal Legislative Assembly election: Jamuria
Party	Candidate	Votes	%	±%
CPI(M)	Jahanara Khan	72,411	52.82	−15.98
AITC	Prabhat Kumar Chatterjee	58,538	42.70	+14.91#
BJP	Pramod Pathak	6,146	4.48	
Majority		13,873	10.12	
Turnout		1,37,161	78.24	
CPI(M) hold		Swing	-30.89#	

.# Swing calculated on Congress+Trinamool Congress vote percentages in 2006 taken together.

=== 2006 ===
In the 2006 state assembly election, Dhirajlal Hazra of CPI (M) won the Jamuria assembly seat defeating his nearest rival Tapan Chakraborty of Trinamool Congress. Contests in most years were multi cornered but only winners and runners are being mentioned. In 2001 and 1996, Pelab Kabi of CPI (M) defeated Shiudashan Nayar of Trinamool Congress and Santosh Adhikari of Congress respectively. In 1991, 1987, 1982 and 1977, Bikash Chowdhury of CPI (M) defeated Tapas Banerjee of Congress, Biswanath Chakraborty of Congress, Pradip Bhattacharya of ICS and Chandra Sekhar of Congress in the respective years.

=== 1972 ===
The Jamuria seat was won by Amarendra Mondal of Congress in 1972, Durgadas Mondal of CPI (M) in 1971, Amarendra Mondal of Congress in 1969, Tinkori Mondal of Samyukta Socialist Party in 1967, and Amarendra Mondal of Congress in 1962. Amarendra Mondal representing Praja Socialist Party had won the Jamuria seat in 1957.
