= Department of Urban Development and Municipal Affairs =

State government department in West Bengal, India

Department of Urban Development & Municipal Affairs
Department overview
- Jurisdiction: Government of West Bengal
- Headquarters: Nagarayan, Block DF-8 Sector-I Salt Lake, Kolkata
- Minister responsible: Agnimitra Paul, Minister-in-Charge
- Department executives: Sri Khalil Ahmed, I.A.S, Principal Secretary; Smt. Sujata Ghosh, IAS & Smt. Nandini Ghosh, IAS, Special Commissioner; Smt. Debarati Datta Gupta, WBCS(Exec.) & Sri Saikat Kumar Dutta, WBCS(Exec.) & Sri Aniruddha Raha, WBCS(Exec.), Special Secretary
- Parent department: Government of West Bengal
- Website: Official Website

The Department of Urban Development & Municipal Affairs is a West Bengal government department. It is an interior ministry mainly responsible for the administration of the urban development and municipal affairs in West Bengal.

== History ==
The urban governance through the ‘Urban Local Bodies' (ULBs) i.e. Municipal Corporations, Municipalities and Notified Area Authorities, in the state of West Bengal dates back to British regime in 18th.century. The first municipal mechanism created during British rule was the Municipal Corporation, set up in the former presidency town of Madras (today Chennai) in 1688 with a view to transfer the financial responsibility of local administration to the newly created corporation. The Mayor's Courts were established in each of the three Presidency towns, Madras, Bombay and Calcutta through the Royal Charter of 1720. In 1882, the then Victory of India, Lord Ripon's resolution of local self-government laid the democratic forms of municipal governance in India. The current form and the structure of municipal bodies are based on Lord Ripon's Resolutions, which was adopted in 1882 as local self-government. The Government of India Act, 1919 incorporated the need for conferment of power to a democratically elected government. This act has another development towards the evolution of urban local bodies in India. In 1935, another Government of India Act brought the local government under the purview of the state of the provincial government and specific powers were given, to those local self-governments.

The Kolkata Municipal Corporation or “KMC” (earlier known as Calcutta Municipal Corporation) is one of the oldest municipal bodies of the country. In 1726, a Mayor's court was established by a Royal Charter. With the expansion of British Government by making Calcutta as a capital of British India in 1773, the municipal services grow up. In 1847 the electoral system was introduced for the first time and the idea of Calcutta Corporation begins to start. In 1876 a new Corporation was created with 72 Commissioners. In 1923, Corporation stands its existence by important changes by Rashtraguru Surendranath Bannerjee, the 1st minister for local self government. The Calcutta Corporation act, 1980 changed the existing system of the corporation. This alteration was more effective and more systematic so far municipal service is concerned, which came into force in 1984.

== Types of Urban Local Bodies ==
=== Municipal Corporation(7) ===
- Asansol Municipal Corporation(AMC)
- Bidhannagar Municipal Corporation(BMC)
- Chandannagore Municipal Corporation(CMC)
- Durgapur Municipal Corporation(DMC)
- Howrah Municipal Corporation(HMC)
- Kolkata Municipal Corporation(KMC)
- Siliguri Municipal Corporation(SMC)

=== Development Authority(21) ===
- Asansol Durgapur Development Authority(ADDA)
- Bakreswar Development Authority(BKDA)
- Birsingha Development Authority(BSDA)
- Burdwan Development Authority(BDA)
- Changra Bandha Development Authority(CBDA)
- Digha Sankarpur Development Authority(DSDA)
- Furfura Sharif Development Authority(FSDA)
- Gangasagar Bakkhali Development Authority(GBDA)
- Gazoldoba Development Authority(GDA)
- Haldia Development Authority(HDA)
- Jaigaon Development Authority(JDA)
- Kolkata metropolitan Development Authority(KMDA)
- Midnapore Kharagpur Development Authority(MKDA)
- Mohabani Development Authority(MBDA)
- Mukutmanipur Development Authority(MDA)
- Newtown Kolkata Development Authority(NKDA)
- Patharchapuri Development Authority(PDA)
- Siliguri Jalpaiguri Development Authority(SJDA)
- Sriniketan Santiniketan Development Authority(SSDA)
- Tarapith Rampurhat Development Authority(TRDA)

=== Municipality/ Notified Area Authority(121) ===
https://udma.wb.gov.in/

=== Industrial Township Authority ===
- Golden City Industrial Township Authority
- Nabadiganta Industrial Township Authority
- Sector-VI Industrial Township Authority

=== 4 Directorates and 1 Branch ===
- Directorate of Local Bodies
- Institute of Local Govt. And Urban Studies
- Municipal Engineering Directorate
- State Valuation Board
- Urban Development Branch
  - Metropolitan Development(MD)Wing
  - Town and Country Planning(T&CP)Wing
  - Urban Land Ceiling (ULC) Wing

=== Statutory Body ===
- West Bengal Municipal Service Commission
- West Bengal Valuation Board

=== Attached Office ===
- Administrator Bidhannagar
- Competent Authority, Kolkata
- Estate Manager, Kalyani
- Estate Office, Bidhannagar
- Estate Office, Patipukur
- Land Manager, Bidhannagar
- Salt Lake Reclamation & Development Circle (SLRDC)
- State Mission for Clean Ganga West Bengal (SMCG WB)
- State Urban Development Agency (SUDA)

== Relevant Constitutional Provisions and Acts ==
- 74th Amendement (1992)
- Article 243W
- 12th Schedule
- The West Bengal Urban Land (Ceiling and Regulation) Act, 1976
- The West Bengal Town & Country (Planning & Development) Act, 1979
- The West Bengal Valuation Board Act, 1978
- The Kolkata Municipal Corporation Act, 1980
- The Howrah Municipal Corporation Act, 1980
- The West Bengal Govt. Premises (Regulation of Occupancy) Act, 1984
- The West Bengal Municipal Act, 1993
- The West Bengal Municipal Elections Act, 1994
- The West Bengal Municipal Corporation Act, 2006
- The West Bengal Thika Tenancy (Acquisition and Regulation) (Amendment) Act, 2024
