= Bikash Chowdhury =

Indian politician

Member of Parliament, Lok Sabha
- In office 1998-2005
- Preceded by: Haradhan Roy
- Succeeded by: Bansa Gopal Chowdhury
- Constituency: Asansol, West Bengal

Member, West Bengal Legislative Assembly
- In office 1977-1996
- Preceded by: Amarendra Mondal
- Succeeded by: Pelab Kabi
- Constituency: Jamuria

Personal details
- Born: 25 December 1932 Saharsa, Bihar
- Died: 1 August 2005 (aged 72)
- Party: CPI(M)

Bikash Chowdhury (25 December 1932 – 1 August 2005) was an Indian politician who represented the Asansol constituency in West Bengal from 1998 till his death in 2005.

Prior to his being elected to the Lok Sabha, he was elected to the West Bengal state legislative assembly from Jamuria (Vidhan Sabha constituency) for four successive terms in 1991, 1987, 1982 and 1977.
