= Bansa Gopal Chowdhury =

Indian politician

Member of the Indian Parliament for Asansol
- In office 2005–2014
- Preceded by: Bikash Chowdhury
- Succeeded by: Babul Supriyo
- Constituency: Asansol

MLA
- In office 1987–2005
- Preceded by: Haradhan Roy
- Succeeded by: Haradhan Jha
- Constituency: Raniganj

Personal details
- Born: 12 January 1960 (age 66). Raniganj, West Bengal
- Party: Expelled from Communist Party of India (Marxist).
- Spouse: Mrs. Shantana Chowdhury
- Children: 2 sons
- Parent(s): Mr. Satyapada Chowdhury (Father), Mrs. Kalyani Chowdhury (Mother)
- Education: Triveni Devi Bhalotia College, Economics graduate.
- Profession: Social worker & politician.
- Committees: Member of several committees

Bansa Gopal Chowdhury is an Indian politician and was the member of Parliament of the 15th Lok Sabha of India who represented the Asansol lok sabha constituency in West Bengal and is a former member of the Communist Party of India (Marxist) political party.

== Early life and education ==
Bansa Chowdhury was born in Raniganj, West Bengal. He did his graduation from Triveni Devi Bhalotia College in Raniganj. Chowdhury was a social worker prior to becoming a politician.

== Political career ==
Bansa Chowdhury, prior to contesting for Lok Sabha elections, was also a member of the West Bengal Legislative Assembly and was also a Cabinet Minister in the West Bengal government. Chowdhury was also an elected parliamentarian from the same constituency in the 14th Lok Sabha of India. He is a former member of CPI(M) West Bengal State Committee and the Secretary of CITU Paschim Bardhaman District Committee. Chowdhury also served as the Chairman of Asansol Durgapur Development Authority till 2011.

== Controversy ==
On 20 April 2025, Smt. Ratna Das, former councillor of Jiaganj Azimganj Municipality alleged in social networking site that Bansa Gopal Chowdhury sent her obscene messages on WhatsApp. Das told that Mr. Chowdhury used to send her obscene messages on Messenger late at night. She prayed justice to the higher officials of the Communist Party of India (Marxist). However Chowdhury denied the allegation. Finally the State Committee of CPI(M), West Bengal expelled him for the issue.

== Posts held ==
#	From	To	Position
01	1987	2005	Member, West Bengal Legislative Assembly
02	1996	2005	Cabinet Minister, West Bengal
03	2005	2009	Member, 14th Lok Sabha
04	2005	2009	Member, Standing Committee on Coal and Steel
05	2009	2014	Member, 15th Lok Sabha
06	2009	2014	Member, Committee on Industry

== See also ==
- 14th Lok Sabha
- 15th Lok Sabha
- Politics of India
- Parliament of India
- Government of India
- Asansol (Lok Sabha constituency)
- Communist Party of India (Marxist)
