= Raniganj, West Bengal Assembly constituency =

Raniganj
- Constituency No. 278 for the West Bengal Legislative Assembly
- Interactive Map Outlining Raniganj Assembly Constituency

Constituency details
- Country: India
- Region: East India
- State: West Bengal
- District: Paschim Bardhaman
- Lok Sabha constituency: Asansol
- Established: 1951
- Total electors: 196,907
- Reservation: None

Member of Legislative Assembly
- 18th West Bengal Legislative Assembly
- Incumbent Partha Ghosh
- Party: Bharatiya Janata Party
- Elected year: 2026

Raniganj Assembly constituency is an assembly constituency in Paschim Bardhaman district in the Indian state of West Bengal.

== Overview ==
As per orders of the Delimitation Commission, No. 278, Raniganj assembly constituency covers Ward nos. 33–37, 88-93 of Asansol Municipal Corporation and Andal community development block.

Raniganj assembly segment is part of No. 40 Asansol (Lok Sabha constituency).

== Members of the Legislative Assembly ==
Year	Member	Party
1951	Pashupatinath Malia	Independent politician
1951	Banku Behari Mandal	Indian National Congress
1957	No seat	
1962	Lakshan Bagdi	Communist Party of India
1967	Haradhan Roy	Communist Party of India
1969	Haradhan Roy	Communist Party of India
1971	Haradhan Roy	Communist Party of India
1972	Haradhan Roy	Communist Party of India
1977	Haradhan Roy	Communist Party of India
1982	Haradhan Roy	Communist Party of India
1987	Bansa Gopal Chowdhury	Communist Party of India
1991	Bansa Gopal Chowdhury	Communist Party of India
1996	Bansa Gopal Chowdhury	Communist Party of India
2001	Bansa Gopal Chowdhury	Communist Party of India
2006	Haradhan Jha	Communist Party of India
2011	Ali Sohrab	All India Trinamool Congress
2016	Runu Dutta	Communist Party of India
2021	Tapas Banerjee	All India Trinamool Congress
2026	Partha Ghosh	Bharatiya Janata Party

== Election results ==
=== 2026 ===
2026 West Bengal Legislative Assembly election: Raniganj
Party	Candidate	Votes	%	±%
BJP	Partha Ghosh	97,416	49.58	+8.63
AITC	Kalobaran Mondal	79,630	40.53	−2.37
CPI(M)	Naran Bauri	13,030	6.63	−5.27
NOTA	None of the above	2,452	1.25	+0.15
Majority		17,786	9.05	+7.1
Turnout		196,484	90.86	+18.21
BJP gain from AITC		Swing		

=== 2021 ===
2021 West Bengal Legislative Assembly election: Raniganj
Party	Candidate	Votes	%	±%
AITC	Tapas Banerjee	78,164	42.9	
BJP	Dr. Bijan Mukherjee	74,608	40.95	+22.6
CPI(M)	Hemant Kumar Prabhakar	21,688	11.9	−71.12
NOTA	None of the above	2,006	1.1	
Majority		3,556	1.95	
Turnout		182,211	72.65	
AITC gain from CPI(M)		Swing		

=== 2016 ===
2016 West Bengal Legislative Assembly election: Raniganj
Party	Candidate	Votes	%	±%
CPI(M)	Runu Dutta	74,995	42.32	−4.38
AITC	Nargis Bano	62,610	35.33	−12.50
BJP	Manish Sharma	32,214	18.17	+14.66
BSP	Ajit Badyakar	2,599	1.46	
BMP	Mamoni Orang	2,081	1.17	
NOTA	None of the above	2,708	1.52	
Majority		12,385	6.99	
Turnout		1,77,288	77.31	
CPI(M) gain from AITC		Swing		

=== 2011 ===
2011 West Bengal Legislative Assembly election: Raniganj
Party	Candidate	Votes	%	±%
AITC	Md. Sohrab Ali	73,810	47.83	+14.99#
CPI(M)	Runu Dutta	72,059	46.70	−25.59
BJP	Shobhapati Singh	5,423	3.51	
JD(U)	Rajkumar Paswan	3,016	1.95	
Majority		1,751	1.13	
Turnout		1,54,453	78.35	
AITC gain from CPI(M)		Swing	+40.58#	

.# Swing calculated on Congress+Trinamool Congress vote percentages in 2006 taken together.

=== 2006 ===
In the 2006 state assembly election, the Raniganj assembly seat was won by Haradhan Jha of CPI (M). He defeated his nearest rival Jitendra Tiwari of Trinamool Congress. Contests in most years were multi cornered but only winners and runners are being mentioned. In 2001, 1996, 1991 and 1987, Bansa Gopal Chowdhury of CPI (M) won the seat defeating his nearest rivals Sampa Sarkar, Senapati Mondal, Sankar Dutta and Kalyani Biswas (all of Congress) in the respective years. In 1982 and 1977, Haradhan Roy of CPI (M) defeated Hare Krishna Goswami and Sarojakshya Mukherjee (both of Congress) in the respective years.

=== 1972 ===
Haradhan Roy of CPI(M) won in 1972, 1971, 1969 and 1967. Lakhan Bagdi of CPI won in 1962. The Raniganj seat was not there in 1957. In independent India's first election in 1951, Banku Behari Mandal of Congress won the Raniganj seat.
