= Asansol Lok Sabha constituency =

Lok Sabha Constituency in West Bengal, India

Coordinates: 23.69°N 86.97°E

Asansol WB-40
- Lok Sabha constituency
- Interactive Map Outlining Asansol Lok Sabha Constituency

Constituency details
- Country: India
- Region: East India
- State: West Bengal
- Assembly constituencies: Pandabeswar; Raniganj; Jamuria; Asansol Dakshin; Asansol Uttar; Kulti; Barabani
- Established: 1957
- Total electors: 17,70,281
- Reservation: None

Member of Parliament
- 18th Lok Sabha
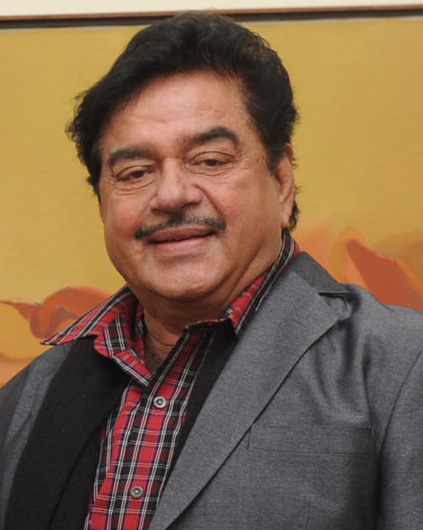
- Incumbent Shatrughan Sinha
- Party: AITC
- Alliance: INDIA
- Elected year: 2024

Asansol Lok Sabha constituency is one of the 543 parliamentary constituencies in India. The constituency centres on Asansol in West Bengal. All the seven assembly segments of No. 40 Asansol Lok Sabha constituency are in Paschim Bardhaman district.

== Overview ==
Parliamentary constituencies in West Bengal - 1. Cooch Behar, 2. Alipurduars, 3. Jalpaiguri, 4. Darjeeling, 5. Raiganj, 6. Balurghat, 7. Maldaha Uttar, 8. Maldaha Dakshin, 9. Jangipur, 10. Baharampur, 11. Murshidabad, 12. Krishnanagar, 13. Ranaghat, 14. Bangaon, 15. Barrackpore, 16. Dum Dum, 17. Barasat, 18. Basirhat, 19. Jaynagar, 20. Mathurapur, 21. Diamond Harbour, 22. Jadavpur, 23. Kolkata Dakshin, 24. Kolkata Uttara, 25. Howrah, 26. Uluberia, 27. Serampore, 28. Hooghly, 29. Arambagh, 30. Tamluk, 31, Kanthi, 32. Ghatal, 33. Jhargram, 34. Medinipur, 35. Purulia, 36. Bankura, 37. Bishnupur, 38. Bardhaman Purba, 39. Bardhaman Durgapur, 40. Asansol, 41. Bolpur, 42. Birbhum

On the eve of 2014 elections, The Statesman described the constituency as follows: "The Asansol Lok Sabha constituency is conspicuous by its mixed population — coal mine workers, factory workers, coal mafia, scrap dealers, minority population and a large section of Hindi speaking population." The New Indian Express said that the constituency was dotted with coal mines and 50% of the electorate was Hindi speaking. The Statesman has put the proportion of non-Bengali voters in the constituency at 36%.

The United News of India (UNI) has been candid about the second largest city and urban agglomeration in West Bengal after Kolkata that is a hub of coal mining and railway activity bordering Jharkhand. Asansol has seen, it writes, "a sustained hold over it by the CPI(M) since 1984 (1989?). Before that it was a tale of fluctuating fortune for the CPI(M) and the Congress... However, as the green surge swept Bengal to demolish the red bastion in 2011 Assembly elections... Moreover, as the Left still remained cornered in state politics, their neutralised voters are increasingly migrating to the BJP for a viable alternative."

The modernisation and expansion programme of IISCO Steel Plant, in this constituency, was completed at a cost of over 16,000 crores. As of 2015, it was the single largest investment in West Bengal till then.

== Assembly segments ==
As per order of the Delimitation Commission issued in 2006 in respect of the delimitation of constituencies in West Bengal, parliamentary constituency no. 40 Asansol is composed of the following assembly segments:

#	Name	District	MLA, from 2026	MLA's Party	2024 Lok Sabha Lead
275	Pandabeswar	Paschim Bardhaman	Jitendra Tiwari	BJP	AITC
278	Raniganj	Paschim Bardhaman	Partha Ghosh	BJP	AITC
279	Jamuria	Paschim Bardhaman	Bijan Mukherjee	BJP	AITC
280	Asansol Dakshin	Paschim Bardhaman	Agnimitra Paul	BJP	BJP
281	Asansol Uttar	Paschim Bardhaman	Krishnendu Mukherjee	BJP	AITC
282	Kulti	Paschim Bardhaman	Ajay Poddar	BJP	BJP
283	Barabani	Paschim Bardhaman	Arijit Roy	BJP	AITC

Before delimitation, Asansol Lok Sabha constituency was composed of the following assembly segments: Kulti (assembly constituency no. 257), Barabani (assembly constituency no. 258), Hirapur (assembly constituency no. 259), Asansol (assembly constituency no. 260), Raniganj (assembly constituency no. 261), Jamuria (assembly constituency no. 262) and Ukhra (SC) (assembly constituency no. 263)

== Members of Parliament ==
Year	Member	Party
1957	Mono Mohan Das	Indian National Congress
1957	Atulya Ghosh	Indian National Congress
1962	Atulya Ghosh	Indian National Congress
1967	Deben Sen	Samyukta Socialist Party
1971	Robin Sen	Communist Party of India (Marxist)
1977	Robin Sen	Communist Party of India (Marxist)
1980	Ananda Gopal Mukherjee	Indian National Congress
1984	Ananda Gopal Mukherjee	Indian National Congress
1989	Haradhan Roy	Communist Party of India (Marxist)
1991	Haradhan Roy	Communist Party of India (Marxist)
1996	Haradhan Roy	Communist Party of India (Marxist)
1998	Bikash Chowdhury	Communist Party of India (Marxist)
1999	Bikash Chowdhury	Communist Party of India (Marxist)
2004	Bikash Chowdhury	Communist Party of India (Marxist)
2005^	Bansa Gopal Chowdhury	Communist Party of India (Marxist)
2009	Bansa Gopal Chowdhury	Communist Party of India (Marxist)
2014	Babul Supriyo	Bharatiya Janata Party
2019	Babul Supriyo	Bharatiya Janata Party
2022^	Shatrughan Sinha	Trinamool Congress
2024	Shatrughan Sinha	Trinamool Congress

^By-Poll

Note: In 1951 the Asansol area was part of Burdwan Lok Sabha constituency. In 1957, it was double seat constituency.

== Election results ==
Vote share of Winning candidates
2024	46.53%
2022 (By-Poll)	56.62%
2019	51.16%
2014	36.75%
2009	48.69%
2005 (By-Poll)	61.33%
2004	51.00%
1999	46.27%
1998	41.09%
1996	46.37%
1991	45.13%
1989	49.59%
1984	55.18%
1980	42.91%
1977	59.07%
1971	49.38%
1967	40.56%
1962	38.84%
1957	29.60%
1957	26.01%

=== 2024 ===
2024 Indian general elections: Asansol
Party	Candidate	Votes	%	±%
AITC	Shatrughan Sinha	605,645	46.53	▼10.09
BJP	S. S. Ahluwalia	546,081	41.96	▲11.05
CPI(M)	Jahanara Khan	105,964	8.14	▲1.34
NOTA	None of the above	15,510	1.19	▲0.08
Majority		59,564	9.78	▼21.38
Turnout		1,200,001	73.52	▲6.78
Registered electors		1,200,201		
AITC hold		Swing		

=== 2022 By-election ===
By-election, 2022: Asansol
Party	Candidate	Votes	%	±%
AITC	Shatrughan Sinha	656,358	56.62	▲21.43
BJP	Agnimitra Paul	353,149	30.46	▼20.70
CPI(M)	Partha Mukherjee	90,412	7.80	▲0.72
INC	Prasenjit Puitandy	15,035	1.30	▼0.40
NOTA	None of the above	12,702	1.11	▼0.06
Majority		3,03,209	26.16	+16.36
Turnout		11,59,764	66.74	
Registered electors		17,37,819		
AITC gain from BJP		Swing	+13.08	

=== 2019 ===
2019 Indian general elections: Asansol
Party	Candidate	Votes	%	±%
BJP	Babul Supriyo Baral	633,378	51.16	+14.41
AITC	Moon Moon Sen	4,35,741	35.19	+4.61
CPI(M)	Gouranga Chattopadhyay	87,608	7.08	−15.31
INC	Biswarup Mondal	21,038	1.7	−2.54
NOTA	None of the above	14,447	1.17	+0.17
Majority		1,97,637	15.97	+9.80
Turnout		12,38,151	76.62	−1.11
Registered electors		16,15,865		
BJP hold		Swing	+4.90	

=== 2014 ===
2014 Indian general elections: Asansol
Party	Candidate	Votes	%	±%
BJP	Babul Supriyo	419,983	36.75	+31.19
AITC	Dola Sen	3,49,503	30.58	−9.95
CPI(M)	Bansa Gopal Chowdhury	2,55,829	22.39	−26.30
INC	Indrani Mishra	48,502	4.24	
Independent	Manash Sarkar	14,263	1.25	
NOTA	None of the Above	11,479	1.00	
Majority		70,480	6.17	−1.99
Turnout		11,42,395	77.73	+6.24
BJP gain from CPI(M)		Swing	+28.75	

=== 2009 ===
General Election, 2009: Asansol
Party	Candidate	Votes	%	±%
CPI(M)	Bansa Gopal Chowdhury	435,161	48.69	−12.64
AITC	Moloy Ghatak	3,62,205	40.53	+13.53
BJP	Suryya Ray	49,646	5.56	
BSP	Ajay Singh	14,490	1.62	
Independent	Jyotirmoy Maity	13,190	1.48	
LJP	Goutam Das	10,181	1.14	
Independent	Jarasandha Sinha	8,831	0.99	
Majority		72,956	8.16	
Turnout		8,93,704	71.49	
CPI(M) hold		Swing		

=== 2005 Bye-election ===
In the Asansol seat, the by-election was held due to the death of the sitting CPI(M)-MP Bikash Chowdhury on 1 August 2005. The Bye election Held On 5 September 2005.Bansa Gopal Chowdhury of CPI(M) defeated Moloy Ghatak of Trinamool Congress.

Indian Parliamentary bye election, 2005: Asansol constituency
Party	Candidate	Votes	%	±%
CPI(M)	Bansa Gopal Chowdhury	4,10,740	61.33	
AITC	Moloy Ghatak	1,80,799	27.00	
INC	Provat Goswami	52,570	7.85	
Independent	Shakti Ranjan Mondal	12,912	1.93	
Independent	Kanchan Kumar Chakraborty	12,719	1.89	
Majority		2,29,941	60%	
Turnout		96,650	47.69	−6.7
CPI(M) hold		Swing	+21.27	

=== 2004 ===
2004 Indian general election: Asansol
Party	Candidate	Votes	%	±%
CPI(M)	Bikash Chowdhury	369,832	51.00	
AITC	Moloy Ghatak	245,514	33.86	
INC	Tapas Banerjee	70,867	9.77	
IND	Sunil Mukherjee	12,552	1.73	
BSP	Manik Lal Bauri	8,830	1.22	
SP	Pratap Singh	6,828	0.94	
IND	Sailendra Nath Bhattacharyya	6,286	0.87	
CPI(ML)L	Atanu Chakravarty	4,489	0.62	
Majority		124,318	17.14	
Turnout		725,198		
CPI(M) hold		Swing		

=== 1999 ===
1999 Indian general election: Asansol
Party	Candidate	Votes	%	±%
CPI(M)	Bikash Chowdhury	377,265	46.27	
AITC	Ajit Ghatak (Moloy Ghatak)	339,401	41.63	
INC	Manik Upadhyay	89,261	10.95	
BSP	Manik Bouri	5,222	0.64	
AMB	Jitendra Mandal	2,354	0.29	
IND	Pradip Kumar Banerjee	970	0.12	
IND	Dilip Paswan	819	0.10	
Majority		37,864	4.64	
Turnout		829,147	65.52	
CPI(M) hold		Swing		

=== 1998 ===
1998 Indian general election: Asansol
Party	Candidate	Votes	%	±%
CPI(M)	Bikash Chowdhury	355,382	41.09	
AITC	Ajit Kumar Ghatak	329,233	38.07	
INC	S. S. Ahluwalia	110,618	12.79	
RJD	Sohrab Ali	43,643	5.05	
IND	Sunil Pal	9,345	1.08	
BSP	Manik Bauri	8,386	0.97	
SJP(R)	Jyotirmoy Maiti	7,106	0.82	
IND	Ganes Chandra Sarkar	1,127	0.13	
Majority		26,149	3.02	
Turnout		883,829	71.12	
CPI(M) hold		Swing		

=== 1996 ===
1996 Indian general election: Asansol
Party	Candidate	Votes	%	±%
CPI(M)	Haradhan Roy	376,806	46.37	
INC	Sukumar Bandyopadhyay	329,856	40.60	
BJP	Surendranath Lamba	69,737	8.58	
IND	Gonesh Pal	11,556	1.42	
JMM	Ajit Soren	8,467	1.04	
IND	Brahmadev Ram	6,215	0.76	
AMB	Gaanty Manik	3,205	0.39	
AIIC(T)	Kishore Chatterjee	2,737	0.34	
IND	Harish Chandra Rajbhar	1,869	0.23	
IND	Bhrigunath Sharma	1,186	0.15	
IND	Bhabani Tosh Mukherjee	891	0.11	
Majority		46,950	5.78	
Turnout		841,736	69.69	
CPI(M) hold		Swing		

=== 1991 ===
1991 Indian general election: Asansol
Party	Candidate	Votes	%	±%
CPI(M)	Haradhan Roy	316,504	45.13	
INC	Deba Prasad Roy	221,646	31.61	
BJP	Kinkar Tapananda Brahmachari	135,641	19.34	
CPI(M-L)	Balahari Mondal	5,739	0.82	
BSP	Jarasandha Bouri	5,600	0.80	
JP	Mihir Upadhyay	4,566	0.65	
IND	Manik Chatterjee	3,352	0.48	
IND	Md. Bodradoja	1,695	0.24	
DDP	Raj Nath Kurmi	1,542	0.22	
IND	Durgadas Mondal	1,459	0.21	
IND	Bikash Chandra Ghosh	1,009	0.14	
IND	Asis Ranjan Sarkar	878	0.13	
IND	Debidas Mukherjee	843	0.12	
IND	Subrata Mitra	766	0.11	
Majority		94,858	13.52	
Turnout		722,290	64.13	
CPI(M) hold		Swing		

=== 1989 ===
1989 Indian general election: Asansol
Party	Candidate	Votes	%	±%
CPI(M)	Haradhan Roy	374,281	49.59	
INC	Pradip Bhattacharjee	332,044	43.99	
BJP	Amarnath Keshri	21,077	2.79	
CPI(M-L)	Ganesh Pal	12,096	1.60	
BSP	Mahendra Paswan	5,019	0.66	
AMB	Ghanty Manik	3,035	0.40	
IND	Sudesh Murmu	2,471	0.33	
IND	Narayan Pandit	1,510	0.20	
IND	G. K. Sharma	1,506	0.20	
DDP	Sambhunath Rajbhar	914	0.12	
IND	Samir Kumar Dey	821	0.11	
Majority		42,237	5.60	
Turnout		771,578	69.86	
Swing to CPI(M) from INC		Swing		

=== 1984 ===
1984 Indian general election: Asansol
Party	Candidate	Votes	%	±%
INC	Anada Gopal Mukherjee	334,212	55.18	
CPI(M)	Bamapada Mukherjee	247,546	40.87	
IND	Manik Bowri	7,360	1.22	
IND	S. M. Samsul Haque	4,968	0.82	
IND	Ghanty Manik Chandra	4,474	0.74	
IND	Chhedilal Jalan	3,993	0.66	
IND	Gopal Krishna Sharma	3,075	0.51	
Majority		86,666	14.31	
Turnout		625,065	69.94	
Swing to INC from INC(I)		Swing		

=== 1980 ===
1980 Indian general election: Asansol
Party	Candidate	Votes	%	±%
INC(I)	Ananda Gopal Mukhopadhya	175,703	42.91	
CPI(M)	Robin Sen	166,051	40.55	
JP	Dr. Gopikaranjan Mitra	27,222	6.65	
INC(U)	Pradip Kumar Bhattacharyya	9,415	2.30	
IND	Badal Bouri	8,460	2.07	
IND	Joy Shankar Chowdhury	6,190	1.51	
RPI	Doman Prasad Bhuiyan	5,749	1.40	
IND	Ghanty Manik	5,070	1.24	
IND	Mahadeb Mukherjee	3,456	0.84	
IND	Mohammad Moslen Khan	2,160	0.53	
Majority		9,652	2.36	
Turnout		423,787	55.52	
Swing to INC(I) from CPI(M)		Swing		

=== 1977 ===
1977 Indian general election: Asansol
Party	Candidate	Votes	%	±%
CPI(M)	Robin Sen	163,492	59.07	
INC	Syed Mohammad Jalal	91,265	32.97	
IND	Badal Bauri	7,716	2.79	
IND	Niroda Prasad Mukherjee	5,657	2.04	
IND	Aditya Baran Bandopadhyay	4,746	1.71	
IND	Naresh Chandra Roy Chaudhury	3,897	1.41	
Majority		72,227	26.10	
Turnout		287,229	44.38	
CPI(M) hold		Swing		

=== 1971 ===
1971 Indian general election: Asansol
Party	Candidate	Votes	%	±%
CPI(M)	Robin Sen	132,268	49.38	
INC	Narayan Choudhury	98,608	36.81	
SSP	Deven Sen	21,364	7.98	
INC(O)	Atulya Ghosh	8,144	3.04	
Bangla Congress	Sohan Prasad Verma	4,606	1.72	
IND	Yar Mohammad	2,880	1.08	
Majority		33,660	12.57	
Turnout		280,338	51.64	
Swing to CPI(M) from SSP		Swing		

=== 1967 ===
1967 Indian general election: Asansol
Party	Candidate	Votes	%	±%
SSP	D. Sen	99,276	40.56	
INC	J. N. Mukhopadhyay	92,284	37.71	
CPI	K. S. Roy	49,138	20.08	
IND	H. S. Roy	4,041	1.65	
Majority		6,992	2.85	
Turnout		255,556	57.56	
Swing to SSP from INC		Swing		

=== 1962 ===
1962 Indian general election: Asansol
Party	Candidate	Votes	%	±%
INC	Atulya Ghosh	70,835	38.84	
CPI	Ket Narayan Misra	61,991	33.99	
PSP	Deben Sen	49,563	27.17	
Majority		8,844	4.85	
Turnout		188,992	41.56	
INC hold		Swing		

=== 1957 ===
1957 Indian general election: Asansol
Party	Candidate	Votes	%	±%
INC	Mono Mohan Das	186,374	29.60	
INC	Atulya Ghosh	163,725	26.01	
IND	Ambuja Bhusan Bose	126,026	20.02	
IND	Amarendra Nath Saha	109,149	17.34	
IND	Moni Mohan Ghose	44,315	7.04	
Majority		22,649	3.59	
Turnout		629,589	39.83	
INC win (new seat)				

== See also ==
- List of constituencies of the Lok Sabha
