= Hareram Singh =

Indian politician

Hareram Singh is a politician serving as the MLA of Jamuria Assembly Constituency since May 2021.

== Political life ==
Hareram Singh is a politician from All India Trinamool Congress. He contested Jamuria Vidhan Sabha seat in South West Bengal region and the Paschim Bardhaman district of West Bengal in the 2021 West Bengal Legislative Assembly Election. The constituency is part of Asansol Lok Sabha constituency, an urban constituency. He won the election by a margin of 8051 votes.

=== 2021 West Bengal Assembly Election ===
2021 West Bengal Legislative Assembly election: Jamuria
Party	Candidate	Votes	%	±%
AITC	Hareram Singh	71,002	42.59	+19.59
BJP	Tapas Kumar Roy	62,951	37.76	+185.62
CPI(M)	Aishe Ghosh	24,818	14.89	−63.06
BSP	Bhanu Pratap Sharma	2,409	1.45	
NOTA	None of the above	2,353	1.41	
Majority		8,051	4.89	
Turnout		1,66,933	75.39	
AITC gain from CPI(M)		Swing		
