= Barabani Assembly constituency =

Barabani
- Constituency No. 283 for the West Bengal Legislative Assembly
- Interactive Map Outlining Barabani Assembly Constituency

Constituency details
- Country: India
- Region: East India
- State: West Bengal
- District: Paschim Bardhaman
- Lok Sabha constituency: Asansol
- Established: 1962
- Total electors: 184,970
- Reservation: None

Member of Legislative Assembly
- 18th West Bengal Legislative Assembly
- Incumbent Arijit Roy
- Party: BJP
- Alliance: NDA
- Elected year: 2026

Barabani Assembly constituency is an assembly constituency in Paschim Bardhaman district in the Indian state of West Bengal.

== Overview ==
As per orders of the Delimitation Commission, No. 283 Barabani assembly constituency covers Barabani and Salanpur community development blocks.

Barabani assembly segment is part of No. 40 Asansol (Lok Sabha constituency).

== Members of the Legislative Assembly ==
Year	Member	Party
1962	Haridas Chakravarty	Communist Party of India
1967	Mihir Upadhyaya	Indian National Congress
1969	Sunil Basu Roy	Communist Party of India
1971	Sunil Basu Roy	Communist Party of India
1972	Sukumar Bandopadhyaya	Indian National Congress
1977	Sunil Basu Roy	Communist Party of India
1982	Ajit Chakrabarty	Communist Party of India
1987	Ajit Kumar Chakrabarty	Communist Party of India
1989^	Manik Upadhyay	Indian National Congress
1991	S. R. Das	Communist Party of India
1996	Manik Upadhyay	Indian National Congress
2001	Manik Upadhyay	All India Trinamool Congress
2006	Dilip Sarkar	Communist Party of India
2011	Bidhan Upadhyay	All India Trinamool Congress
2016	Bidhan Upadhyay	All India Trinamool Congress
2021	Bidhan Upadhyay	All India Trinamool Congress
2026	Arijit Roy	BJP

- ^ by-election

== Election results ==
=== 2026 ===
2026 West Bengal Legislative Assembly election: Barabani
Party	Candidate	Votes	%	±%
BJP	Arijit Roy	91,777	49.54	▲11.14
AITC	Bidhan Upadhyay	80,055	43.21	▼9.05
ISF	Biswajit Bauri (Bapi)	5,576	3.01	
INC	Jaydev Roy	2,621	1.41	▼3.89
NOTA	None of the above	2,765	1.49	▼0.31
Majority		11,722	6.33	▼7.53
Turnout		185,274	91.68	▲16.68
BJP gain from AITC		Swing		

=== 2021 ===
*The change percentage is based on votes polled by CPI(M) in the previous election. In this election INC is in alliance with CPI(M) and in the previous election it did not contest from this seat.

2021 West Bengal Legislative Assembly election: Barabani
Party	Candidate	Votes	%	±%
AITC	Bidhan Upadhyay	88,430	52.26	
BJP	Arijit Roy	64,973	38.4	
INC	Ranendranath Bagchi	8,962	5.3	
Independent	Paban Nunia	2,156	1.27	
NOTA	None of the above	3,039	1.8	
Majority		23,457	13.86	
Turnout		169,207	75.0	
AITC hold		Swing		

=== 2016 ===
2016 West Bengal Legislative Assembly election: Barabani
Party	Candidate	Votes	%	±%
AITC	Bidhan Upadhyay	77,464	47.13	
CPI(M)	Shipra Mukherjee	53,415	32.50	
BJP	Amal Roy	25,224	15.35	
SHS	Krishnapada Nath Goswami	3,480	2.12	
NOTA	None of the above	2,761	1.68	
Majority		24,049	14.63	
Turnout		1,64,486	79.53	
AITC hold		Swing		

=== 2011 ===
In the 2011 election, Bidhan Upadhyay of Trinamool Congress defeated his nearest rival Abhas Raychaudhuri of CPI(M).

2011 West Bengal Legislative Assembly election: Barabani
Party	Candidate	Votes	%	±%
AITC	Bidhan Upadhyay	78,628	52.92	+8.03#
CPI(M)	Abhas Raychaudhuri	58,051	39.07	−12.95
BJP	Biswanath Roy	4,980	3.35	
IND	Dinesh Karmakar	3,332	2.24	
JMM	Amal Mondal	2,623	1.77	
Majority		20,577	13.85	
Turnout		1,48,680	80.32	
AITC gain from CPI(M)		Swing	+20.98#	

.# Swing calculated on Congress+Trinamool Congress vote percentages in 2006 taken together.

=== 2006 ===
In the 2006 state assembly elections, Dilip Sarkar of CPI (M) won the Barabani assembly seat defeating Manik Upadhyay of Trinamool Congress. Contests in most years were multi cornered but only winners and runners are being mentioned. Manik Upadhyay representing Trinamool Congress in 2001 and Congress in 1996, won the seat twice defeating Rudranath Mukherjee and Paresh Maji, both of CPI (M), respectively. In 1991, S.R.Das of CPI (M) defeated Manik Upadhyay of Congress. In 1989, Manik Upadhyay of Congress won the Barabani seat in a bye election. In 1987 and 1982, Ajit Chakraborty of CPI (M) defeated Manik Upadhyay and Dhiraj Sain, both of Congress, respectively. In 1977, Sunil Basu Roy of CPI (M) defeated Sukumar Bandopadhyay of Congress.

=== 1972 ===
Prior to that those who won the Barabani seat were Sukumar Banerjee of Congress in 1972, Sunil Basu Roy of CPI (M) in 1971 and 1969, Mihir Upadhyay of Congress in 1967, and Haridas Chakraborty of CPI in 1962.
