= Bidhan Upadhyay =

Indian politician

Personal details
- Profession: Politician

Bidhan Upadhyay is an Indian politician member of All India Trinamool Congress. He was an MLA, elected from the Barabani constituency in the 2011 West Bengal state assembly election. In 2016 and 2021 assembly election he was re-elected from the same constituency.
