= Deben Sen =

Indian trade union activist

Personal details
- Born: 1897/1899?
- Died: 19 April 1971
- Party: Indian National Congress, Krishak Mazdoor Praja Party, Praja Socialist Party, Samyukta Socialist Party

Deben Sen (1897/1899? – 19 April 1971) was an Indian trade union activist and politician.

== Early life ==
The son of Dwarikanath Sen, of Faridpur (now in Bangladesh), Deben Sen joined the civil disobedience movement and was arrested at Dhaka in 1930, when he was a post graduate student.

== Trade Union activities ==
Deben Sen was a very effective trade union organiser, spreading his activities in Calcutta of the mid-thirties across railways, tramways and electric supply organisations. In 1937, he organized a historic jute industry strike. In 1956, he led a strike of 56,000 workers in Asansol for 27 days. He visited many countries in connection with trade union work and was leader of the Indian delegation to the London Trade Union Conference in 1948.

== Involvement in politics ==
He was elected to the Bengal Legislative Assembly in 1946 on a Congress ticket. In 1951, he joined the Krishak Mazdoor Praja Party. He was organizing secretary of INTUC, chairman of the West Bengal branch of the Hind Mazdoor Sabha and leader of the Praja Socialist Party and Samyukta Socialist Party. He was actively associated with the Asian Conference in support of Indonesian independence. He was elected to the Lok Sabha in 1967 from the Asansol (Lok Sabha constituency).
