= Shonal Rawat =

Model and TV presenter

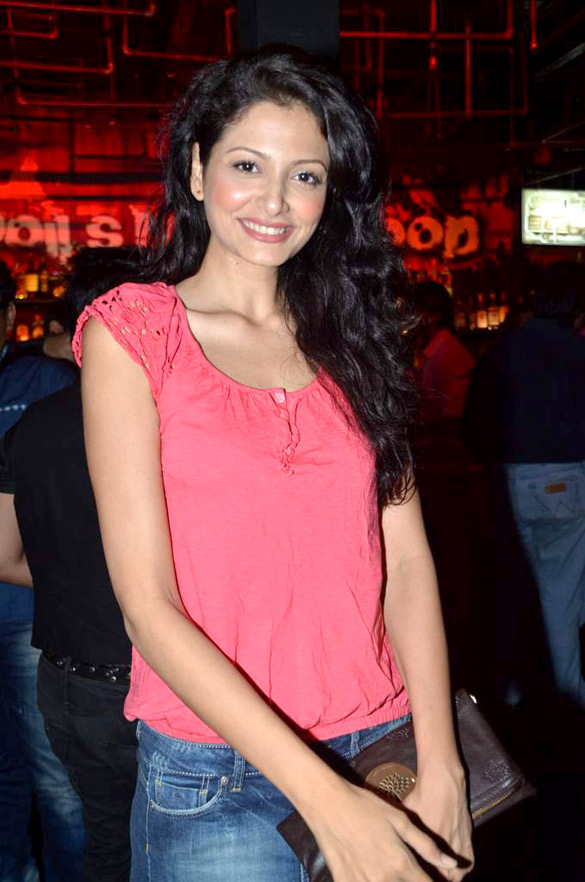
- Sonal Rawat in 2012
- Born: Kolkata, West Bengal, India
- Occupations: Model, Television presenter
- Height: 1.80 m (5 ft 11 in)
- Spouse: Karan Vats (m. 2013)
- Beauty pageant titleholder
- Title: Femina Miss India Asia-Pacific 2003
- Major competitions: Femina Miss India Asia-Pacific 2003 (Winner); Miss Asia Pacific 2003 (1st Runner Up) (Miss friendship) (Miss talent) (Miss Congeniality)

Shonal Rawat is an Indian former model and television anchor. She won Femina Miss India, 2003 and was subsequently sent to Miss Asia Pacific, 2003. She anchors Zoom Network talk shows and is a VJ. She is best known for the music video, Bindiya Chamkegi remixed by Bally Sagoo.

== Personal life ==
Her father is an Indian Police Service officer and her mother has her own kindergarten in Kolkata. Since her father was posted in West Bengal she had attended schooling in different parts of the states she done her matriculate from Loreto House, and other from Ashok Hall. She married her boyfriend, Karan Vats in 2013.

== Career ==
=== Modelling ===
She won Femina Miss India in 2003 and represented India at Miss Asia Pacific in that year and finished second at the 43rd Pageant in Tokyo, Japan. In 2004, she appeared in the mega hit video Bindiya Chamkegi with Upen Patel. Subsequently she has been an active model, appearing in shows for Satya Paul.

=== Television ===
Shonal Rawat has acted in Hindi comedy serial Aaj Ke Shriman Shrimati as a film actress Aishwarya Sen. She is all set to host Sony TV's comedy-based reality show Champion Chaalbaaz No.1. As the channel heads took a combined decision of not overexposing Mona Singh to the reality show scenario, keeping in mind the to-be-launched reality show, The Extreme Makeover, Shonal Rawat now takes over the anchoring responsibilities of Champion Chaalbaaz No. 1.

== Filmography ==
Television
Title	Role
Champion Chaalbaaz No.1	Host
Planet Bollywood	Host/presenter

Awards and achievements
Preceded by Tina Chatwal	Femina Miss India; 2003	Succeeded by Simran Chandok

Awards and achievements
Preceded by Elsy Gurrola	Miss Congeniality; 2003	Succeeded by Vida Samadzai
