= Ajay Kumar Poddar =

Indian politician

Cabinet Minister, Government of West Bengal
- Incumbent
- Assumed office 1 June 2026
- Governor: R. N. Ravi
- Chief Minister: Suvendu Adhikari

Member of the West Bengal Legislative Assembly
- Incumbent
- Assumed office 2 May 2021
- Preceded by: Ujjal Chatterjee
- Constituency: Kulti

Personal details
- Party: Bharatiya Janata Party
- Education: MBBS
- Alma mater: Ranchi Medical College
- Profession: Doctor

Ajay Kumar Poddar is an Indian politician from Bharatiya Janata Party. In May 2021, he was elected as a member of the West Bengal Legislative Assembly from Kulti (constituency). He defeated Ujjal Chatterjee of All India Trinamool Congress by 679 votes in 2021 West Bengal Assembly election.

== Political career ==
On 1 June 2026, he was sworn in as a Cabinet Minister of West Bengal, along with twelve other members.

== Electoral performance ==
West Bengal Legislative Assembly
Year	Constituency	Party	Votes	%	Opponent	Party	Votes	%	Margin	Result
2021	Kulti	BJP	81,112	46.41	Ujjal Chatterjee	AITC	80,433	46.02	679	Won
2026	Kulti	BJP	1,03,570	54.44	Abhijit Ghatak	AITC	77,072	40.51	26,498	Won

== See also ==
- 2026 West Bengal Legislative Assembly election
- List of chief ministers of West Bengal
- West Bengal Legislative Assembly
- 18th West Bengal Assembly
