= 2011 Rajya Sabha elections =

Elections for the upper house of Indian Parliament

16 seats to the Rajya Sabha (Note: Including 6 casual vacancies)
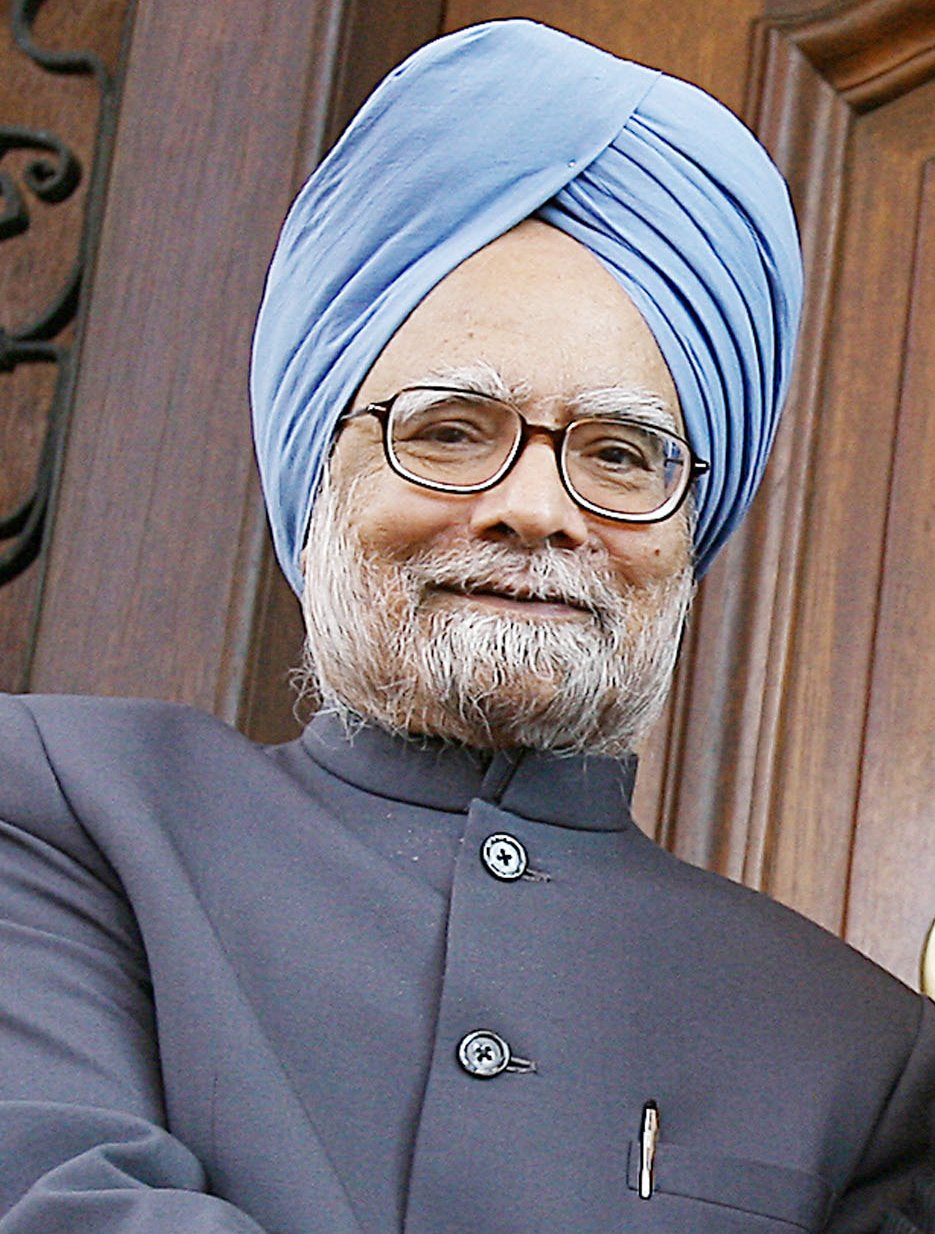

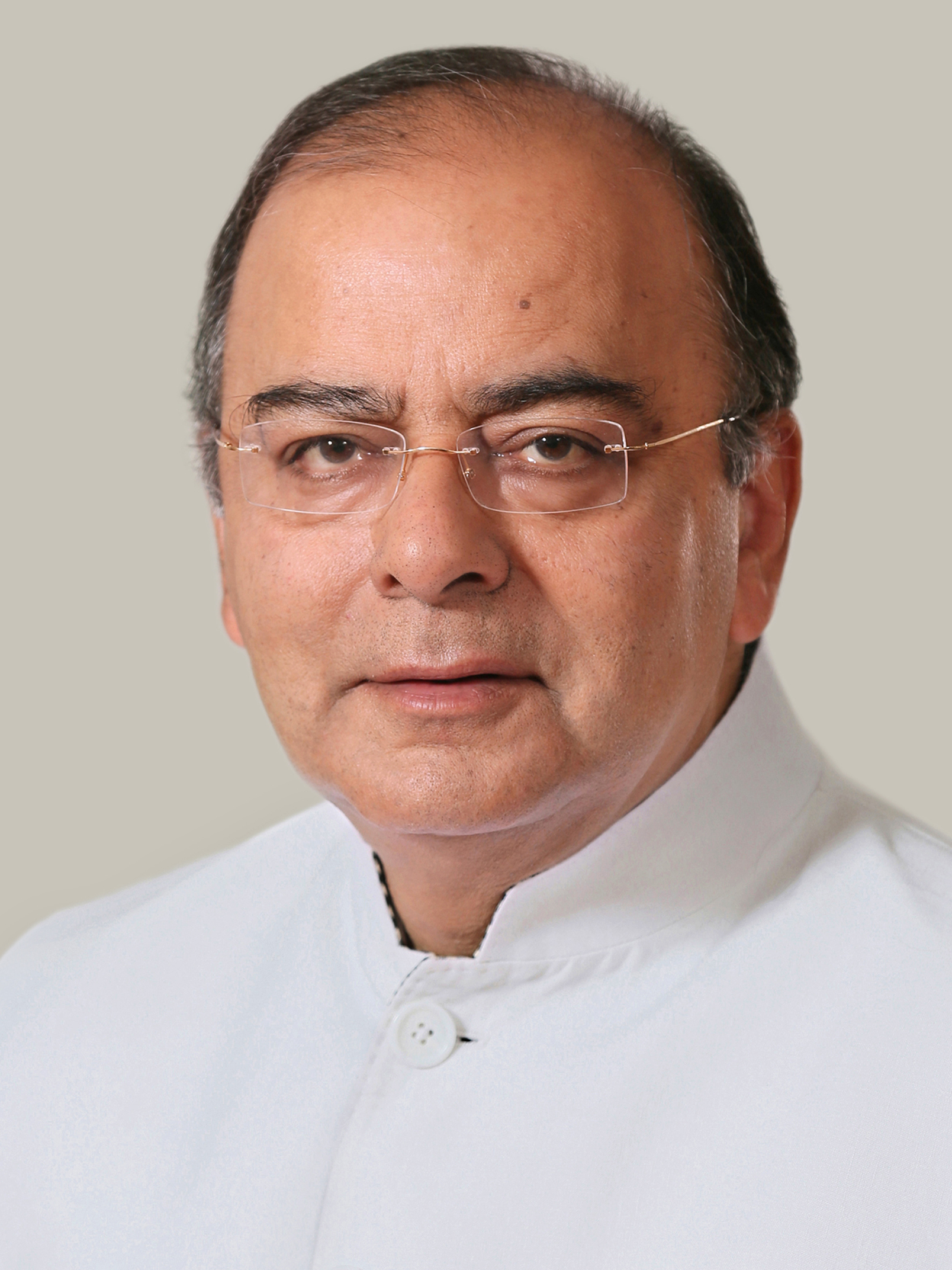
	First party	Second party
Leader	Manmohan Singh	Arun Jaitley
Party	INC	BJP

Elections were held on various dates in 2011 to elect members of the Rajya Sabha, Indian Parliament's upper chamber. The elections were held on 22 July to elect respectively 1 member from Goa, 3 members from Gujarat and 6 members from West Bengal for the Council of States, the Rajya Sabha.

== Elections ==
Elections were held to elect members from Goa, Gujarat and West Bengal. The following members are elected in the elections held in 2011.

=== Goa ===
Seat No	Previous MP	Previous Party	Elected MP	Elected Party	Reference
1.	Shantaram Naik	INC	Shantaram Naik	INC	

=== Gujarat ===
Seat No	Previous MP	Previous Party	Elected MP	Elected Party	Reference
1.	Ahmed Patel	INC	Ahmed Patel	INC	
2.	Pravin Naik	BJP	Smriti Irani	BJP	
3.	Surendra Motilal Patel	BJP	Dilip Pandya	BJP	

=== West Bengal ===
Seat No	Previous MP	Previous Party	Elected MP	Elected Party	Reference
1.	Abani Roy	RSP	Sukhendu Sekhar Roy	AITC	
2.	Arjun Kumar Sengupta	IND	Derek O'Brien	AITC	
3.	Mohammed Amin	CPI(M)	Debabrata Bandyopadhyay	AITC	
4.	Swapan Sadhan Bose	AITC	Srinjoy Bose	AITC	
5.	Sitaram Yechury	CPI(M)	Sitaram Yechury	CPI(M)	
6.	Brinda Karat	CPI(M)	Pradip Bhattacharya	INC	

== Bye-elections ==
The bye-elections were also held for the vacant seats from the State of Karnataka, Madhya Pradesh, Maharashtra & Tamil Nadu, Assam and Bihar.

=== Karnataka ===
- Bye-elections were held on 3 March 2011 for vacancy from Karnataka due to death of seating member M. Rajasekara Murthy on 05/12/2010 with term ending on 02/04/2012.

Seat No	Previous MP	Previous Party	Elected MP	Elected Party	Reference
1.	M. Rajasekara Murthy	JDS	Hema Malini	BJP	

=== Madhya Pradesh ===
- Bye-elections were held on 12 May 2011 for vacancy from Madhya Pradesh due to death of seating member Arjun Singh on 04/03/2011 with term ending on 02/04/2012.

Seat No	Previous MP	Previous Party	Elected MP	Elected Party	Reference
1.	Arjun Singh	INC	Meghraj Jain	BJP	

=== Maharashtra ===
- Bye-elections were held on 22 July 2011 for vacancy from Maharashtra due to resignation of seating member Prithviraj Chavan on 06/05/2011 with term ending on 02/04/2014

Seat No	Previous MP	Previous Party	Elected MP	Elected Party	Reference
1.	Prithviraj Chavan	INC	Husain Dalwai	INC	

=== Tamil Nadu ===
- Bye-elections were held on 22 July 2011 for vacancy from Tamil Nadu due to resignation of K. P. Ramalingam on 20/05/2011 with term ending on 29/06/2016.

Seat No	Previous MP	Previous Party	Elected MP	Elected Party	Reference
1.	K. P. Ramalingam	DMK	A. W. Rabi Bernard	AIADMK	

=== Assam ===
- Bye-elections were held on 22 December 2011 for vacancy from Assam due to death of seating member Silvius Condpan on 10/10/2011 with term ending on 02/04/2016.

Seat No	Previous MP	Previous Party	Elected MP	Elected Party	Reference
1.	Silvius Condpan	INC	Pankaj Bora	INC	

=== Bihar ===
- Bye-elections were held on 22 December 2011 for vacancy from Bihar due to resignation of Sabir Ali of LJP on 15/11/2011 with term ending on 09/04/2014.

Seat No	Previous MP	Previous Party	Elected MP	Elected Party	Reference
1.	Sabir Ali	LJP	Sabir Ali	JDU	
