= 2017 Rajya Sabha elections =

Elections for the upper house of Indian Parliament

- 21 July and 8 August 2017

15 seats to the Rajya Sabha (Note: Including 5 casual vacancies)
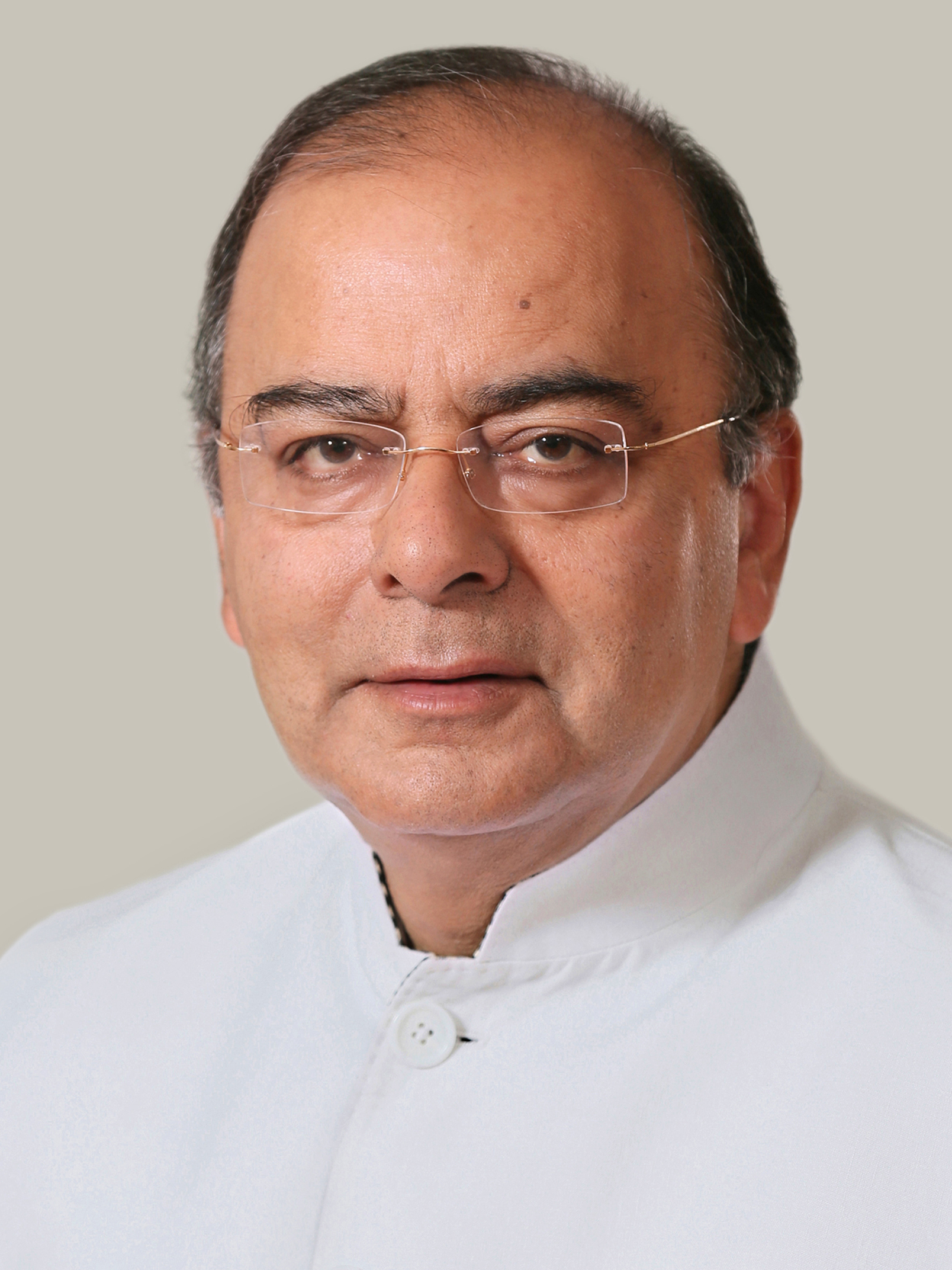

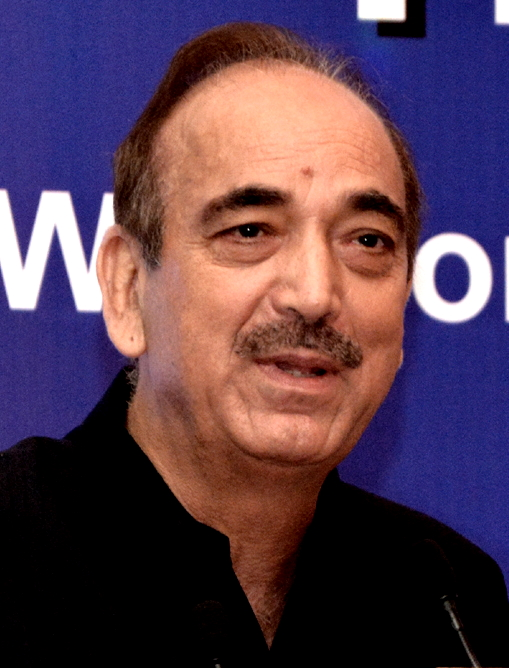

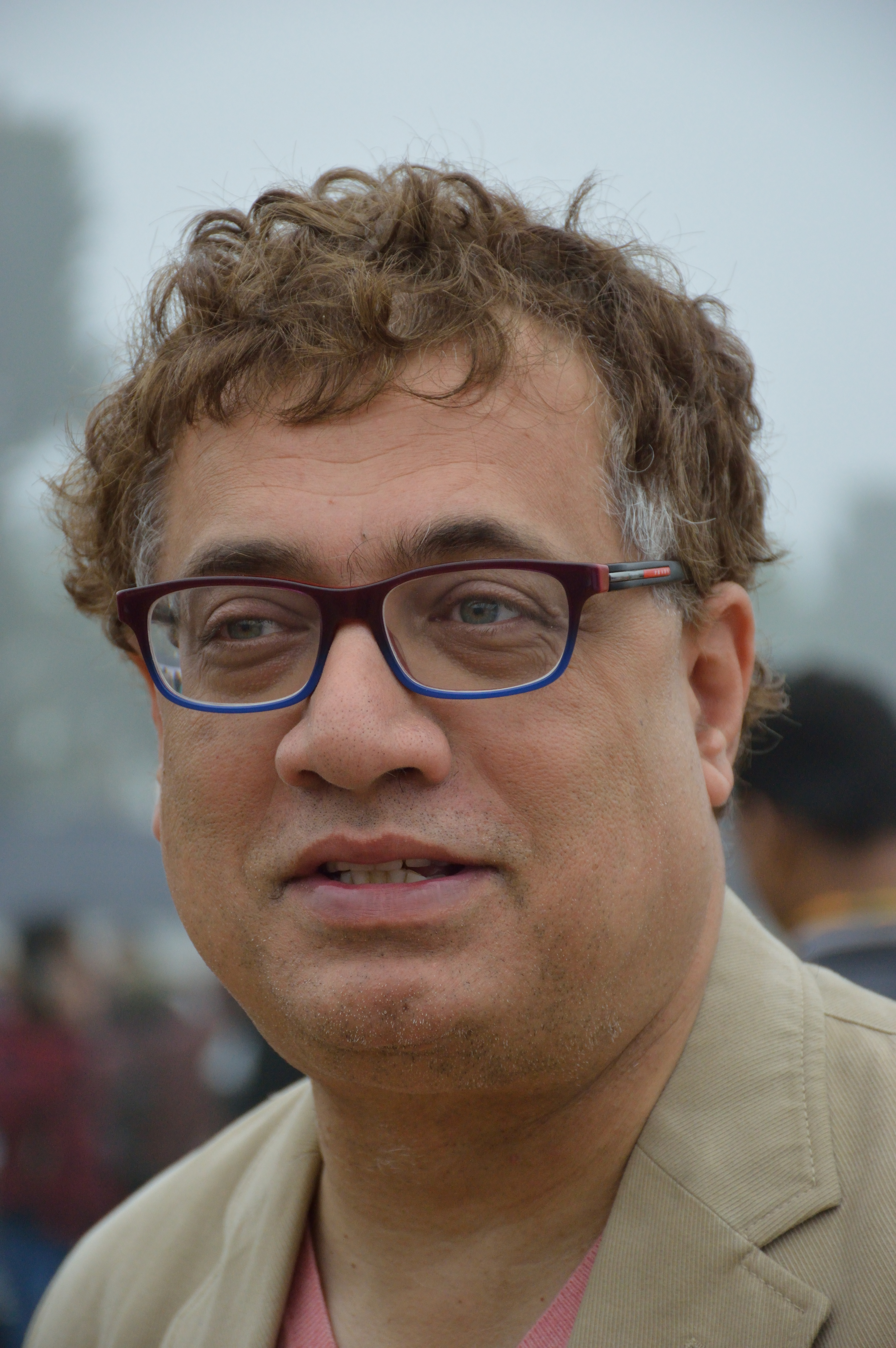

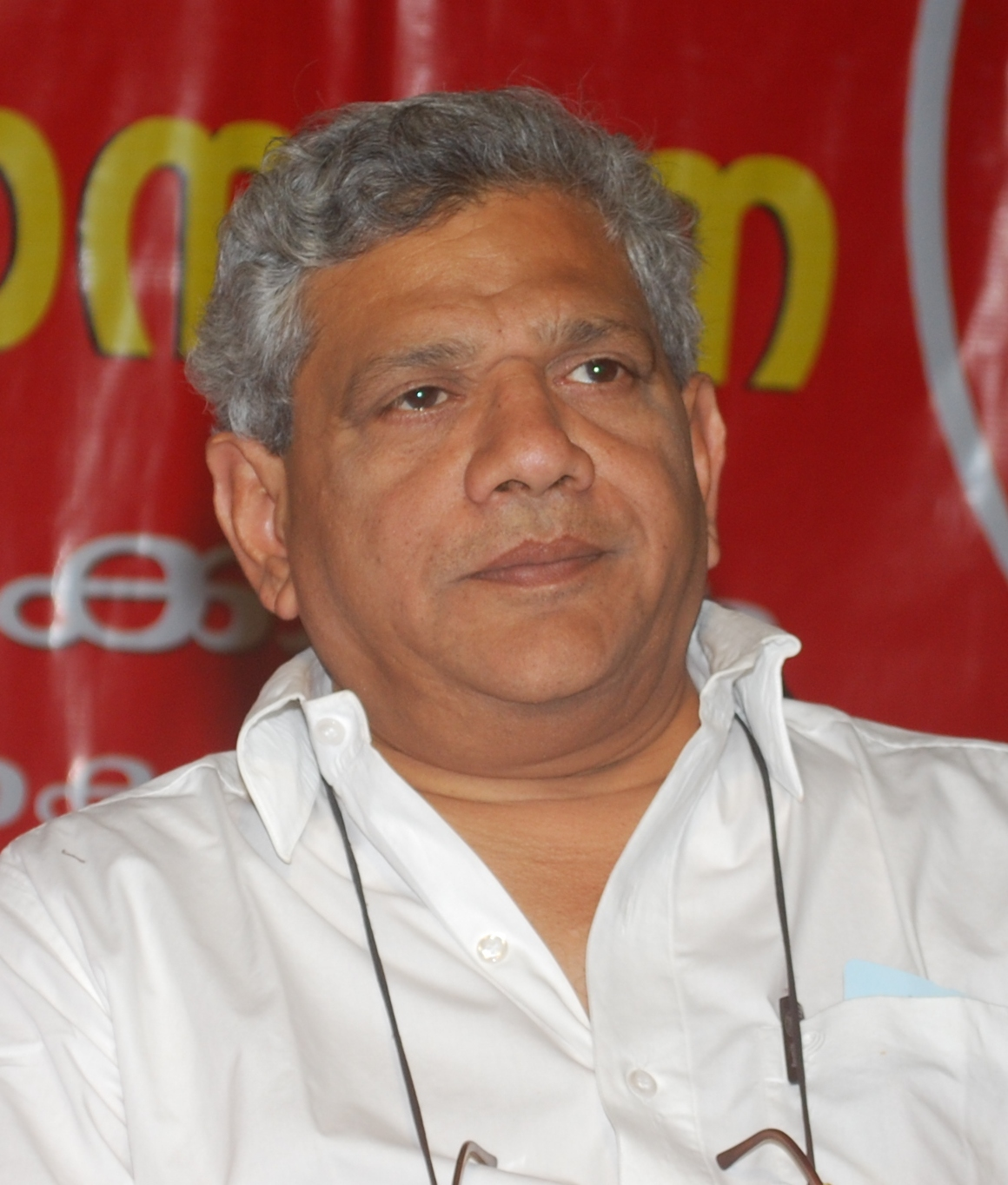
	First party	Second party
Leader	Arun Jaitley	Ghulam Nabi Azad
Party	BJP	INC
Alliance	NDA	UPA
Leader since	2 June 2014	8 June 2014
Leader's seat	Gujarat	Jammu and Kashmir
Seats before	56	60
Seats after	58	58
Seat change	▲2	▼2
	Third party	Fourth party
Leader	Derek O'Brien	Sitaram Yechury
Party	AITC	CPI(M)
Alliance	Federal Front	Left Front
Leader since	19 August 2011	August 2005
Leader's seat	West Bengal	West Bengal
Seats before	12	8
Seats after	13	7
Seat change	▲1	▼1

Elections were held in India on 21 July and 8 August 2017 as nomination contests by state legislators routinely for ten members of the Rajya Sabha across three states, replacing those who retired in July and August 2017. The State Legislatures which contribute in this six-year minor elections/nomination cycle are Goa, Gujarat and West Bengal. The mechanism is the single transferable vote (STV) among legislators, meaning nominations may be unopposed contests (commonly in states with an absolute majority for a particular party in its legislative, public elections). The open ballot is used rather than secret ballot, allowing public scrutiny.

The year also saw five by-elections one of which saw a state's co-representative change, owing to a change in the make-up of the relevant legislature in the intervening three years.

The 2017 six-yearly cycle is of great importance to Goa, where its sole Rajya Sabha member is chosen by its current legislators; 3 of 11 members for Gujarat and 6 of 16 members are also so elected (see cross-party nomination contests) in this cycle.

The outcome in party terms, which tends to reflect the current popular political make-up of the relevant legislatures, was primarily no change (12 of the 15 seats involved in 2017). The other three seats to reflect state political changes were two intervening sufficient mathematical state gains in support for the BJP at state elections, at the expense of the INC entitling two BJP nominations rather than INC and one state gain in support (sufficient proportional representation swing) for the AITC which had cost the Communist Party of India (Marxist), specifically in West Bengal.

== Members retiring ==
The following members retired in 2017.

State	Retiring MP	Party	Date of retirement	Reference
Goa	Shantaram Naik	INC	28 July 2017	
Gujarat	Ahmed Patel	INC	18 August 2017	
Gujarat	Smriti Irani	BJP	18 August 2017	
Gujarat	Dilip Pandya	BJP	18 August 2017	
West Bengal	Sukhendu Sekhar Roy	AITC	18 August 2017	
West Bengal	Derek O'Brien	AITC	18 August 2017	
West Bengal	Debabrata Bandyopadhyay	AITC	18 August 2017	
West Bengal	Dola Sen	AITC	18 August 2017	
West Bengal	Sitaram Yechury	CPI(M)	18 August 2017	
West Bengal	Pradip Bhattacharya	INC	18 August 2017	

== Members elected ==
=== Goa ===
Goa's main party in its legislature saw its nomination contest for Goa's sole seat on July 21, 2017.

Seat No	Former MP	Former Party	Elected MP	Elected Party	Reference
1	Shantaram Naik	INC	Vinay Tendulkar	BJP	

=== Gujarat ===
Gujarat had an election for 3 Rajya Sabha seats on August 8, 2017.

Seat No	Former MP	Former Party	Elected MP	Elected Party	Reference
1	Smriti Irani	BJP	Smriti Irani	BJP	
2	Dilip Pandya	BJP	Amit Shah	BJP	
3	Ahmed Patel	INC	Ahmed Patel	INC	

=== West Bengal ===
West Bengal had elected the 6 Rajya Sabha seat unopposed.

Seat No	Former MP	Former Party	Elected MP	Elected Party	Reference
1	Derek O'Brien	AITC	Derek O'Brien	AITC	
2	Dola Sen	AITC	Dola Sen	AITC	
3	Sukhendu Sekhar Roy	AITC	Sukhendu Sekhar Roy	AITC	
4	Debabrata Bandyopadhyay	AITC	Manas Bhunia	AITC	
5	Sitaram Yechury	CPI(M)	Shanta Chhetri	AITC	
6	Pradip Bhattacharya	INC	Pradip Bhattacharya	INC	

== By-elections ==
In addition to scheduled elections, unforeseen vacancies, caused by members' resignation or death, may also be filled via By-elections.

=== West Bengal ===
- On 29 December 2016, Mithun Chakraborty, a Trinamool Congress member from West Bengal, resigned his seat, citing health reasons.

S.No	Former MP	Party	Date of Vacancy	Elected MP	Party	Date of appointment	Date of retirement
1	Mithun Chakraborty	All India Trinamool Congress	29 Dec 2016	Manish Gupta	All India Trinamool Congress	2 March 2017	3 April 2020

=== Odisha ===
- On 21 March 2017, Bishnu Charan Das of Odisha resigned after he was appointed as Deputy Chairman of Odisha State Planning Board.

S.No	Former MP	Party	Date of Vacancy	Elected MP	Party	Date of appointment	Date of retirement
1	Bishnu Charan Das	Biju Janata Dal	21 March 2017	Pratap Keshari Deb	Biju Janata Dal	18 May 2017	1 July 2022

=== Manipur ===
- On 28 February 2017, Manipur representative Haji Abdul Salam died.

S.No	Former MP	Party	Date of Vacancy	Elected MP	Party	Date of appointment	Date of retirement
1	Haji Abdul Salam	Indian National Congress	28 February 2017	Bhabananda Singh	Bharatiya Janata Party	25 May 2017	9 April 2020

=== Madhya Pradesh ===
- On 18 May 2017, Anil Madhav Dave, a Bharatiya Janata Party member from Madhya Pradesh died.

S.No	Former MP	Party	Date of Vacancy	Elected MP	Party	Date of appointment	Date of retirement
1	Anil Madhav Dave	Bharatiya Janata Party	30 June 2016	Sampatiya Uike	Bharatiya Janata Party	1 August 2017	29 June 2022

=== Rajasthan ===
- On 10 August 2017, Venkaiah Naidu's resigned from membership of the Rajya Sabha from Rajasthan, due to his election as the Vice President of India.

S.No	Former MP	Party	Date of Vacancy	Elected MP	Party	Date of appointment	Date of retirement
1	Venkaiah Naidu	Bharatiya Janata Party	10 August 2017	Alphons Kannanthanam	Bharatiya Janata Party	9 November 2017	4 July 2022
