= List of Rajya Sabha members from Manipur =

The list of current and past Rajya Sabha members from the Manipur State. State elect 1 member for the term of 6 years and indirectly elected by the state legislators, since year 1972.

== Current Members ==
#	Name	Party	Term start	Term end
1	Adhikarimayum Sharda Devi	BJP	22/06/2026	21/06/2032

== Former members ==
Name	Party	Term start	Term end
Arman Ali Munshi (Note: Manipur & Tripura)	Others	03/04/1952	02/04/1954
Ng Tompok Singh	INC	03/04/1954	02/04/1956
Laimayum Lalit Madhob Sharma	INC	01/12/1956	02/04/1960
Laimayum Lalit Madhob Sharma	INC	03/04/1960	02/11/1964 (Note: Died)
Sinam Krishnamohan Singh	INC	13/01/1965	02/04/1966
Sinam Krishnamohan Singh	INC	10/04/1966	02/04/1972
Salam Tombi Singh	Others	10/04/1972	04/04/1974 (Note: Resigned)
Irengbam Tompok Singh	INC	18/06/1974 (Note: By-ele 1974 due to resignation of S T Singh)	09/04/1978
Ng Tompok Singh	INC	10/04/1978	09/04/1984
Rajkumar Jaichandra Singh	INC	10/04/1984	12/07/1988
Rajkumar Dorendra Singh	INC	20/09/1988	12/03/1990
B. D. Behring	JD	10/04/1990	10/04/1990
W. Kulabindu Singh	JD	13/06/1990 (Note: By-election due to the resignation of Behring)	09/04/1996
W. Angou Singh	INC	10/04/1996	09/04/2002
Rishang Keishing	INC	10/04/2002	09/04/2008
Rishang Keishing	INC	10/04/2008	09/04/2014
Abdul Salam	INC	10/04/2014	28/02/2017
Bhabananda Singh	BJP	25/05/2017 (Note: Bye-elections due to the death of Abdul Salam)	09/04/2020
Leishemba Sanajaoba	BJP	22/06/2020	21/06/2026
