= 2015 Rajya Sabha elections =

Elections for the upper house of Indian Parliament

- Various dates in 2015

18 seats to the Rajya Sabha (Note: Including 5 casual vacancies)
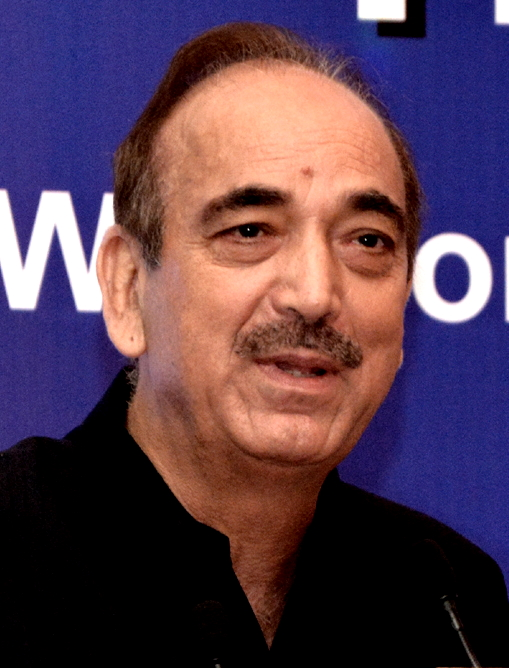

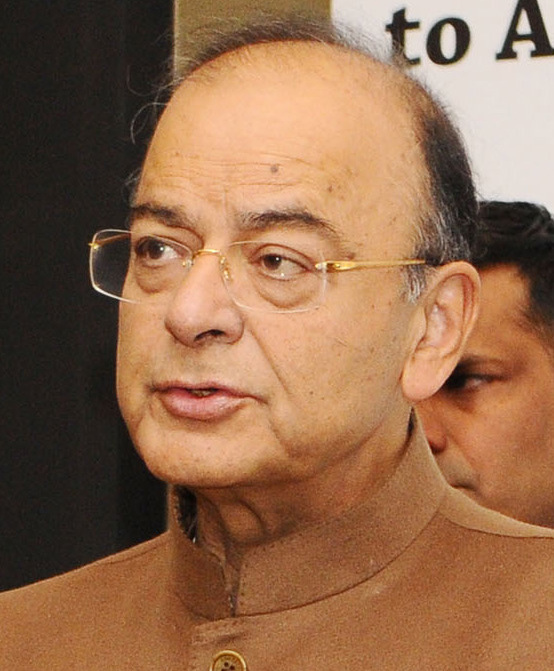
	First party	Second party
Leader	Ghulam Nabi Azad	Arun Jaitley
Party	INC	BJP
Alliance	UPA	NDA
Leader since	8 June 2014	3 June 2009
Leader's seat	Jammu and Kashmir	Gujarat
Seats before	69	45
Seats won	66	48
Seat change	▼3	▲3

Rajya Sabha elections were held in India in 2015 to elect eight members of the Rajya Sabha, the upper house of the Indian Parliament. Five by-elections were also held. The regular elections were held to fill seats in the States of Jammu and Kashmir, Kerala, and the Union Territory of Pondicherry.

== Jammu and Kashmir ==
Jammu and Kashmir had an election on 7 February 2015.

Seat No	Previous MP	Previous Party	Elected MP	Elected Party	Reference
1	Ghulam Nabi Azad	Indian National Congress	Ghulam Nabi Azad	Indian National Congress	
2	Saifuddin Soz	Indian National Congress	Shamsheer Singh Manhas	Bharatiya Janata Party	
3	G. N. Ratanpuri	Jammu & Kashmir National Conference	Fayaz Ahmad Mir	Jammu & Kashmir People's Democratic Party	
4	Mohammad Shafi	Jammu & Kashmir National Conference	Nazir Ahmad Laway	Jammu & Kashmir People's Democratic Party	

== Kerala ==
Kerala was supposed to have an election on 16 April 2015. But, the election was postponed to 20 April.

Seat No	Previous MP	Previous Party	Elected MP	Elected Party	Reference
1	M. P. Achuthan	Communist Party of India (Marxist)	K.K. Ragesh	Communist Party of India (Marxist)	
2	P Rajeev	Communist Party of India (Marxist)	P. V. Abdul Wahab	Indian Union Muslim League	
3	Vayalar Ravi	Indian National Congress	Vayalar Ravi	Indian National Congress	

== Pondicherry ==
Pondicherry held the election on 28 September 2015 to elect one Member of Parliament.

Seat No	Previous MP	Previous Party	Elected MP	Elected Party
1	P. Kannan	Indian National Congress	N Gokulakrishnan	All India Anna Dravida Munnetra Kazhagam

== By-elections ==
The following bye-elections were also held in 2015.

- The bye elections were announced to be held on 20 March to fill the vacancy caused by death of Murli Deora representing Maharashtra, resignation of Srinjoy Bose representing West Bengal and death of Manorama Dobriyal Sharma from Uttarakhand. Three new members were elected unopposed on 14 March 2015, for the vacancy Amar Shankar Sable with the term till 2 April 2020, Dola Sen with the term till 18 August 2017 and Raj Babbar with the term till 25 November 2020 respectively.
- The bye election was held on 2 July, to fill the vacancy caused by resignation of Kanwar Deep Singh representing Jharkhand. M. J. Akbar of BJP won the election after defeating Haji Hussain Ansari of the JMM and got the term till 29 June 2016.
- The bye elections were announced to be held on 14 December to fill the vacancy caused by death of Kalpataru Das representing Odisha. Narendra Kumar Swain was elected unopposed on 7 December 2015, with the term till 2 April 2020.

Sr No	State	Previous MP	Party	Reference	Elected MP	Party	Reference
1	Maharashtra	Murli Deora	Congress		Amar Shankar Sable	BJP	
2	Uttarakhand	Manorama Dobriyal Sharma	Congress		Raj Babbar	Congress	
3	West Bengal	Srinjoy Bose	Trinamool Congress		Dola Sen	Trinamool Congress	
4	Jharkhand	Kanwar Deep Singh	JMM		M. J. Akbar	BJP	
5	Odisha	Kalpataru Das	BJD		Narendra Kumar Swain	BJD	
