= St. Xavier's Collegiate School =

Private Catholic school in Kolkata, India

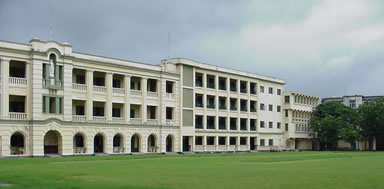
- St. Xavier's Collegiate School

Location
- 30 Mother Teresa Sarani; Kolkata, West Bengal; India; 22°32′54″N 88°21′21″E

Information
- Type: Private school Catholic school
- Motto: Latin: Nihil Ultra (Nothing Beyond)
- Religious affiliation: Roman Catholic
- Denomination: Jesuits
- Patron saint: Francis Xavier
- Established: 16 January 1860; 166 years ago
- School board: Indian Certificate of Secondary Education (year 10); Indian School Certificate (year 12)
- Session: April–March
- Rector: Jeyaraj Veluswamy
- Principal: Rev. Fr Roshan Tirkey SJ
- Headmaster: Gabriel Gomes
- Faculty: 83
- Gender: Boys
- Enrollment: 2,300
- Classes: Kg-12
- Average class size: 40
- Language: English
- Campus: Urban
- Colours: Blue and white
- Nickname: Xaverian; SXCS
- Yearbook: The Xaverian
- Annual tuition: ≈₹1,00,900
- Affiliation: Council for the Indian School Certificate Examinations
- Website: www.sxcs.edu.in

St. Xavier's Collegiate School (informally SXCS) is a private Catholic primary and secondary school for boys, located in Calcutta, in the region of West Bengal in India. The school was founded in 1860 by the Jesuits under the supervision of Henri Depelchin, and it is named after Francis Xavier, a 16th-century Jesuit missionary to India. The school has approximately 2,300 students.

== History ==
One of the elite institutes of India, St. Xavier's Collegiate School was founded in 1860 by the Society of Jesus, an all-male Catholic religious order. The school is named after St. Francis Xavier, a Spanish Jesuit saint. The founder of the school is Fr. Henri Depelchin, S.J., who oversaw most of the groundwork during the early years.

=== San Souci theatre ===
The San Souci theatre at 30 Park Street (now Mother Teresa Sarani), Kolkata-700016, was burned to the ground in 1843. The property was purchased by Jesuits from Belgium and became the present campus.

=== Foundation years ===
The motto, Latin: Nihil ultra (translated as "nothing beyond"), along with the crest of the college date to the rectorship of Fr. O'Neill, S.J., 1904–1913.

The present imposing five-storey building was built from 1934 to 1940 at a cost of Rs 9 lakhs, which was collected partly from the public of Calcutta, assistance from Belgium, and the huge rental received from the American army that occupied the building during World War II. Expansion of the school has been a long effort, with a campus slated for Salt Lake City, Kolkata and a second boys' hostel not far from the existing one.

A commemorative stamp was issued by the Indian Post Office on 12 April 1985 depicting the campus and in its commentary recognising the school's contribution to society. In 2019, the foundation stone was laid for a new nursery (US: kindergarden) section.

== Programmes ==
Students have excelled on the Indian Certificate of Secondary Education exam. In 2015, a student secured the highest marks in the ICSE examination while in 2017 a student scored the highest marks, in the Indian School Certificate examination. In 2013 Xavier was ranked by Digital Learning as the top school in West Bengal.

The school is divided into houses namely Berchmans, Britto, Gonzaga and Loyola, all trained in synchronized marching. The tertiary section extended to co-educational Honours Arts and Science programmes and Teacher Training while still on the high school campus.

In 2011 Xavier was judged the best eco-initiative school in Calcutta for its preparation of compost manure for organic gardening. The school won a football tournament organized to promote outdoor exercise (so that youth do not become addicted to staying indoors with their computers). The travelling cricket team in 2016 secured the first place in a tournament in Leicester, in the United Kingdom. In September 2016 the school hosted an exhibition of about 90 paintings of Mother Teresa to commemorate her canonization that month.

== Steps toward university ==
St Xavier's is expanding into tertiary education in collaboration with other groups, as with the Jesuit Xavier School of Management in Jamshedpur, on a new 17-acre campus in Rajarhat near New Town, Calcutta. A research centre with postgraduate courses is also planned. While schools of engineering and medicine are being considered, plans are progressing slowly with the aim of keeping fees low so that a wide range of students will be able to afford the education.

== Notable alumni ==
- Abu Sayeed Ayyub, Indian philosopher, teacher, literary critic
- Rabindranath Tagore, first Asian Nobel Laureate
- Jagadish Chandra Bose, biologist, physicist, biophysicist, botanist, archaeologist and Fellow of the Royal Society
- Norman Pritchard, first Asian-born athlete to win an Olympic medal
- Jyoti Basu, longest-serving Chief Minister of West Bengal (1977–2000))
- Siddhartha Shankar Ray, former Chief Minister of West Bengal
- Utpal Dutt, Indian film and theatre actor, theatre director, and writer-playwright
- Sanjiv Goenka, industrialist
- Shashi Tharoor, Member of Parliament
- Raj Kapoor, noted Bollywood actor
- General Shankar Roy Chowdhury, former Chief of Army Staff in the Indian Army and former Member of Parliament
- Kaushik Basu, former Chief Economist of the World Bank (2012–2016)
- Sanjeev Sanyal, Member of the Economic Advisory Council to the Prime Minister of India
- Sourav Ganguly, former captain of the Indian cricket team and 39th President of the Board of Control for Cricket in India
- P. Lal, writer
- Neil O'Brien, quizmaster and former Member of Parliament
- Derek O'Brien, quizmaster and Member of Parliament
- Ananda S. Bandyopadhyay, Deputy Director - Polio at the Gates Foundation
- Vijay Balasubramanian, theoretical physicist and theoretical neuroscientist

== See also ==
- List of Jesuit schools
- List of schools in West Bengal
