= Pransakha Vivekananda =

2015 novel by Ranjan Bandyopadhyay

- Author: Ranjan Bandyopadhyay
- Original title: প্রাণসখা বিবেকানন্দ
- Subject: Life of Swami Vivekananda
- Genre: Novel
- Published: 2015
- ISBN: 978-8183743723

Pransakha Vivekananda (2015) is a Bengali biographical novel written by Ranjan Bandyopadhyay. The book has 3 volumes. It was at the first position in Anandabazar Patrika's ten weekly popular books' list in October 2015.

== Plot ==
The novel is based on the life of Swami Vivekananda. The books presents the eventful life of Vivekananda to the readers in form of a story, and not a mere biography.

== Publication ==
The writing was started publishing in Bengal newspaper Sangbad Pratidin' weekly supplementary Chhuti and it continued for 2 1/2 years. It was published in a bokk format by Patra Bharati in July 2015. Swami Purnatmananda, a monk of Ramakrishna Mission officially launched the book.
