= Derek O'Brien (politician) =

Indian quiz master and politician (born 1961)

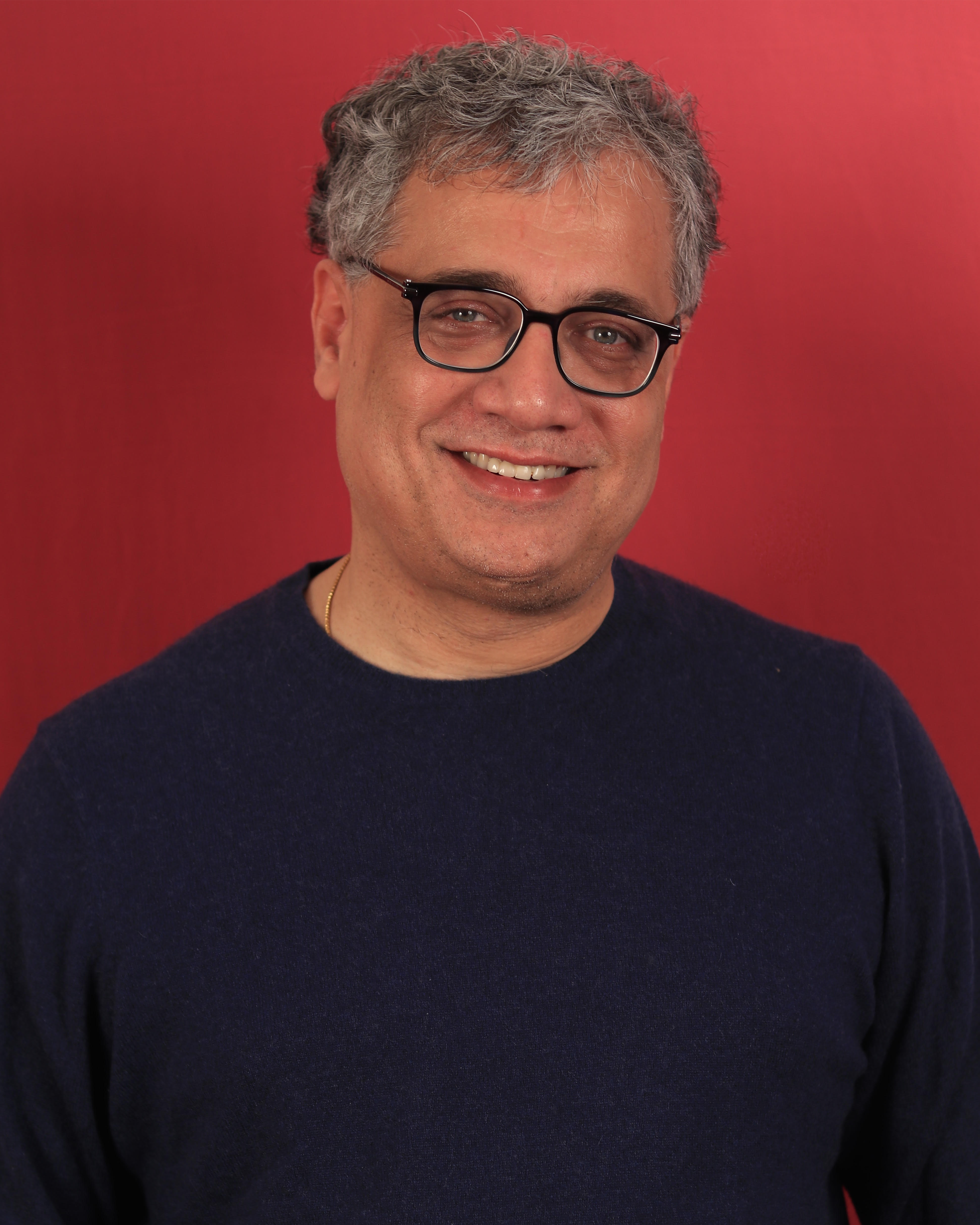
- Official portrait, 2019

Leader of Mamata All India Trinamool Congress in Rajya Sabha
- Incumbent
- Assumed office 19 August 2011
- Appointed by: Mamata Banerjee

18 September 2026
- Incumbent
- Assumed office 19 August 2011
- Preceded by: Arjun Kumar Sengupta
- Constituency: West Bengal

National Secretary of Mamata All India Trinamool Congress
- Incumbent
- Assumed office 5 June 2026 Serving with Dola Sen
- Chairperson: Mamata Banerjee

Personal details
- Born: 13 March 1961 (age 65) Kolkata, West Bengal, India
- Party: Mamata All India Trinamool Congress
- Spouses: Rila Banerjee (m. 1991); Tonuca Basu (m. 2006)
- Children: 1
- Parents: Neil O'Brien (father); Joyce O'Brien (mother)
- Education: Scottish Church College (B.A); St Xavier's Collegiate School, Kolkata; St. Columba's School, Delhi
- Occupation: Politician; quizmaster
- Website: www.derek.in

Derek O'Brien (born 13 March 1961) is an Indian politician, television personality, quizmaster, and author. He is now the National Joint Secretary of All India Trinamool Congress. He has been elected three times as Member of Parliament to the Rajya Sabha. He represents Bengal in Parliament and serves as the Parliamentary Party Leader of the third largest party in Parliament, the Mamata All India Trinamool Congress.

In 2012, he represented India and addressed the United Nations General Assembly. He was awarded ‘Parliamentarian Of The Year’ in 2023.

He has addressed students at Harvard, Yale, Columbia, IIMs, IITs and various other premier institutions across India and globally.

For three years in a row (2001–03) he was conferred the Best Anchor award by the Indian Television Academy. He hosted shows, including the Bournvita Quiz Contest.

== Personal background ==
O'Brien, whose mother tongue is English, is based in Kolkata and speaks, reads and writes equally fluently in Bengali.

O'Brien went to St. Xavier's Collegiate School in Kolkata and, for a short period, St. Columba's School in Delhi, and then spent two years at Scottish Church College, Kolkata. O'Brien is the eldest of three sons of Joyce and Neil O'Brien (1934–2016). Neil O'Brien worked and retired as the chairman and managing director of Oxford University Press India as well as leading the Anglo-Indian community for two decades.

He is married to Tonuca Basu, who is practising medicine in Brooklyn, New York. He was earlier married to Rila Banerjee and the couple has a daughter, Aanya.

== Professional and quizzing career ==
O'Brien began his career as a trainee journalist at Sportsworld before joining the advertising agency Ogilvy, where he became creative director for its Delhi and Kolkata offices. O'Brien hosted quiz programmes including the Bata North Star Quiz and the Maggi Quiz for Schools. He later entered corporate quizzing through the Economic Times Brand Equity Quiz. In 1991, he left Ogilvy and founded Big Ideas, later renamed Derek O'Brien & Associates.

In 2008, O'Brien travelled to Pakistan to film a quiz programme.

During a 2016 visit to the United States, O'Brien said that he had lectured at the Harvard Kennedy School and had conducted interactive sessions at Yale, Columbia, several Indian Institutes of Management, Indian Institutes of Technology, and the National Law School of India University. He addressed students at IIM Calcutta in 2014 and participated in the SRCC Business Conclave in 2016.

He has served as president of the Dalhousie Institute Club.

== Political career ==
O'Brien joined the Trinamool Congress in 2004, when the party was still in opposition in West Bengal. He later wrote that he was drawn to the charisma and personality of the Trinamool Congress leader Mamata Banerjee, and felt she was the only one who could defeat the then CPI(M)-led government in the state.

=== Spokesperson for the Trinamool Congress ===
In 2015, O'Brien was appointed as the Chief National Spokesperson for the Trinamool Congress He came to national media attention during Mamata Banerjee's protest against the CPI(M) government's land acquisition attempt in Singur (2006) and then in the run-up to the 2009 Lok Sabha election, in which Trinamool Congress handed the CPI(M) its first defeat in West Bengal since 1977. He pioneered his party's social media outreach.

In 2011, following the Trinamool Congress victory in the West Bengal assembly election, O'Brien was elected to the Rajya Sabha.

=== First term in Rajya Sabha ===
He was sworn in as Member of Parliament on 19 August 2011 and is one of 16 MPs elected to the Rajya Sabha from West Bengal. In 2012, Trinamool Congress named him as its Chief Whip in the Rajya Sabha.

In 2012, O'Brien cast a vote in the presidential election to elect the 13th President of India. His vote is believed to be the first presidential vote cast by an elected member of the Anglo-Indian community—as members of the community have previously been nominated to the Lok Sabha and other assemblies and are not eligible to vote.

In 2012, he addressed the United Nations General Assembly as a member of the Indian parliamentary delegation.

==== Parliamentary Committees ====
He was the Chairman of the Department-related Parliamentary Standing Committee on Transport, Tourism, and Culture from September 1, 2017, to September 12, 2019. Presently, he serves as a member of the following key parliamentary committees: the General Purposes Committee, the Business Advisory Committee, the Ethics Committee, the Transport, Tourism and Culture Committee, and the Human Resource Development Committee. He served on the Railway Convention Committee and has also been a member of parliamentary select (specific issue) committees on the Goods and Services Tax Constitutional Amendment Bill, the Insurance Bill, the Land Acquisition Bill, the Citizenship Act Amendment Bill. He has spoken in Parliament on a range of issues, from demonetisation, to net neutrality, Jammu and Kashmir, railways and juvenile justice, and participated in the discussion on the Motion of Thanks to the President of India's address to Parliament.

=== Second term in Rajya Sabha ===
His second term as an MP of the Rajya Sabha began on 19 August 2017 and ended on 18 August 2023.

On 20 September 2020, when the Farm Reform Bill was placed in the Rajya Sabha for passage, Derek O'Brien protested, and along with other members allegedly heckled the Deputy Chairman of the Rajya Sabha Harivansh Narayan Singh. Media verifiable sources mention that the House was in complete chaos and unrest to protest the bill. This chaos led to the 10-minute suspension of the House. Ministry of Parliamentary Affairs sought his suspension, along with some other members, as a consequence for his actions under rule 256 of procedure and conduct of business. He along with eight other MPs were suspended for one week on account of their unruly and unparliamentary behaviour.

==== Parliamentary Committees ====
He was a member of the Parliamentary Standing Committee on Home Affairs. On 6 January 2022 he wrote to Anand Sharma, head of the committee, to discuss the alleged app "Tek Fog" that "has serious ramifications and could jeopardise national security.". He wrote, "This application is capable of penetrating encrypted messaging platforms and secure social media conversations in order to heavily manipulate and exploit narratives on said platforms." The app was later debunked as non-existent and The Wire, which had published the news first, took down their article, fired the journalist responsible and published an apology.

== Author ==
O'Brien has written books on quizzing and parliamentary politics. His book Inside Parliament: Views from the Front Row was reviewed by The Hindu. In 2026, he published Politics, Policy and Predictions: Views from the Front Row of Parliament.

== Election History ==
=== Rajya Sabha ===
Position	Party	Constituency	From	To	Tenure
Member of Parliament, Rajya Sabha (1st Term)	AITC	West Bengal	19 August 2011	18 August 2017	15 years, 58 days
Member of Parliament, Rajya Sabha (2nd Term)	AITC	West Bengal	19 August 2017	18 August 2023	15 years, 58 days
Member of Parliament, Rajya Sabha (3rd Term)	AITC	West Bengal	19 August 2023	18 August 2029	15 years, 58 days
