= Arjun Kumar Sengupta =

Indian economist and politician

Arjun Sengupta MP, Dr
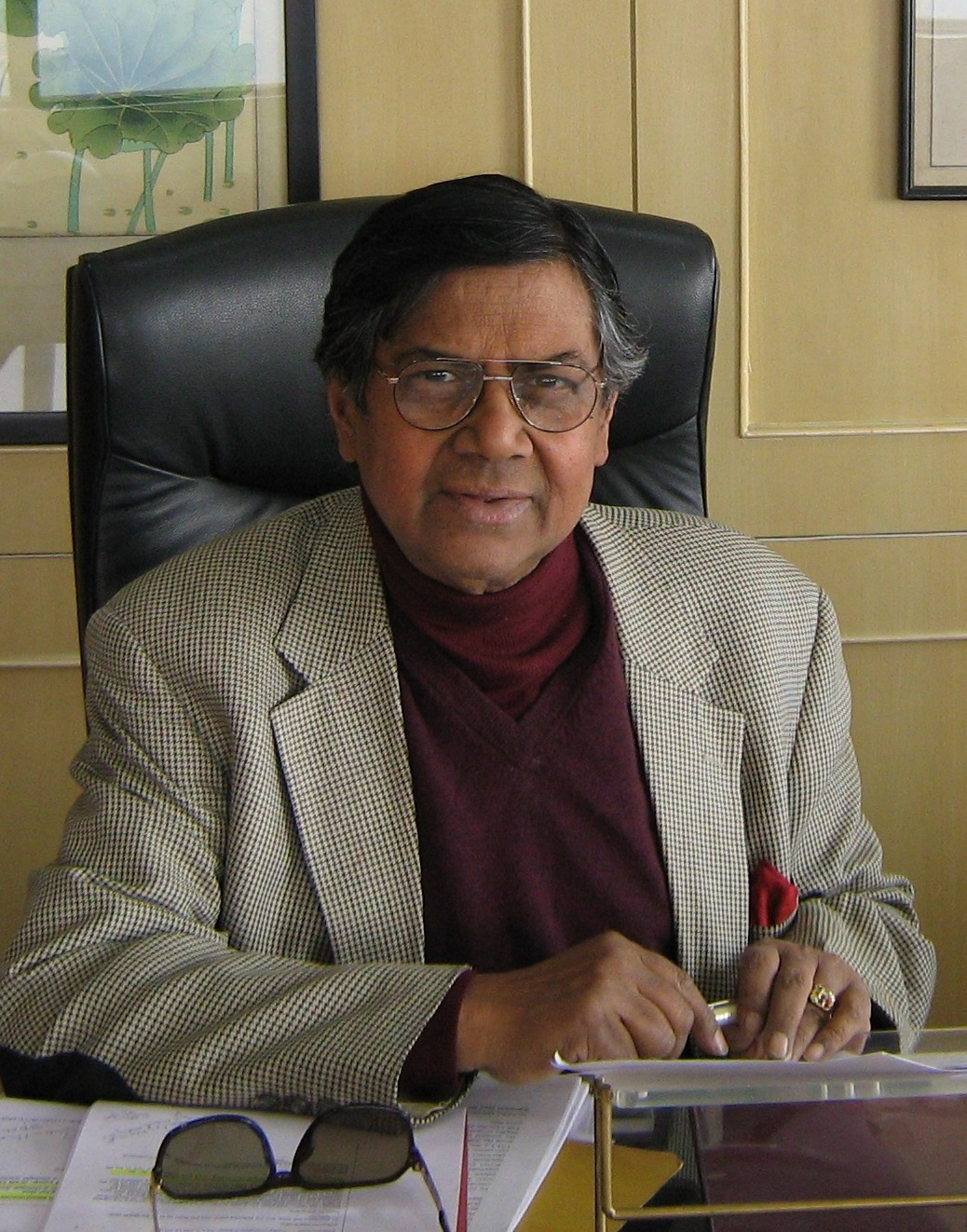
- Arjun Sengupta in January 2008

Member of Parliament, Rajya Sabha
- In office 2005–2010
- Constituency: West Bengal

United Nations Independent Expert on extreme poverty and human rights
- In office 2004–2008
- Preceded by: Anne Marie Lizin
- Succeeded by: Magdalena Sepúlveda Carmona

Indian Ambassador to European Union
- In office 1990–1993
- Prime Minister: Chandra Shekhar; P. V. Narasimha Rao

Executive Director and Special Advisor, Managing Director of International Monetary Fund
- In office 1985–1990

Personal details
- Born: 10 June 1937 Kolkata, Bengal, British India
- Died: 26 September 2010 (aged 73) New Delhi, India
- Spouse: Jayshree Dutt Sengupta
- Children: 1
- Relatives: Achintya Kumar Sengupta (Uncle)
- Education: PhD
- Alma mater: Massachusetts Institute of Technology
- Occupation: Member of the parliament of India (Rajya Sabha), academic, civil servant, diplomat

Arjun Kumar Sengupta (10 June 1937 – 26 September 2010) was an Indian economist. He served as a Member of the Parliament of India, representing West Bengal in the Rajya Sabha from 2006 until his death. In addition to being a Parliamentarian, he was one of India's most noted economists, and led a multifaceted career as an academic and economic policy administrator.

== Life and career ==
Arjun Sengupta was born in Kolkata in 1937. After finishing his schooling at the Mitra Institution in the Bhawanipur neighbourhood of Kolkata, he graduated from the Presidency College, then affiliated with the University of Calcutta. At Presidency College, he was a member of the All-India Students' Federation, a radical student organisation affiliated with the Communist Party of India, then undivided. He later received a doctorate in Economics from the Massachusetts Institute of Technology under advisor Robert Solow, at the age of 27. His career included eminent posts such as Special Secretary to the Prime Minister of India, Indira Gandhi (1981–1984), Executive Director and Special Adviser to the managing director of the International Monetary Fund (1985–1990), India's Ambassador to the European Union (1990–1993), Member Secretary of the Planning Commission (1993–1998), and Member of Parliament, Rajya Sabha (2005 until his death). As an educator, he traversed many institutions, including Jawaharlal Nehru University, Delhi School of Economics, London School of Economics and Harvard University. Arjun Sengupta also served as the UN's Independent Expert on the Right to Development, the UN's Independent Expert on Human Rights and Extreme Poverty, and member of the United Nations Development Program's Commission on Legal Empowerment of the Poor.

Sengupta died of prostate cancer, which was first diagnosed in 2005. He is survived by his wife, Jayshree, and daughter, Madhura (Mitu), and brothers Arya and Pinaki.

== Commemoration ==
The United Nations Human Rights Council observed a moment of silence for Sengupta on 27 September 2010 and the Rajya Sabha was adjourned on 9 November 2010, as a mark of respect to him.

Delivering the Arjun Sengupta Memorial Lecture organised by the Indian Society of Labour Economics on 16 December 2010, Prabhat Patnaik described Sengupta as an "iconoclast" and lauded the many roles he played "in his long and distinguished career."

On 26 March 2013, Sengupta was honoured posthumously by the Government of Bangladesh for his contribution to the Bangladesh Liberation War.

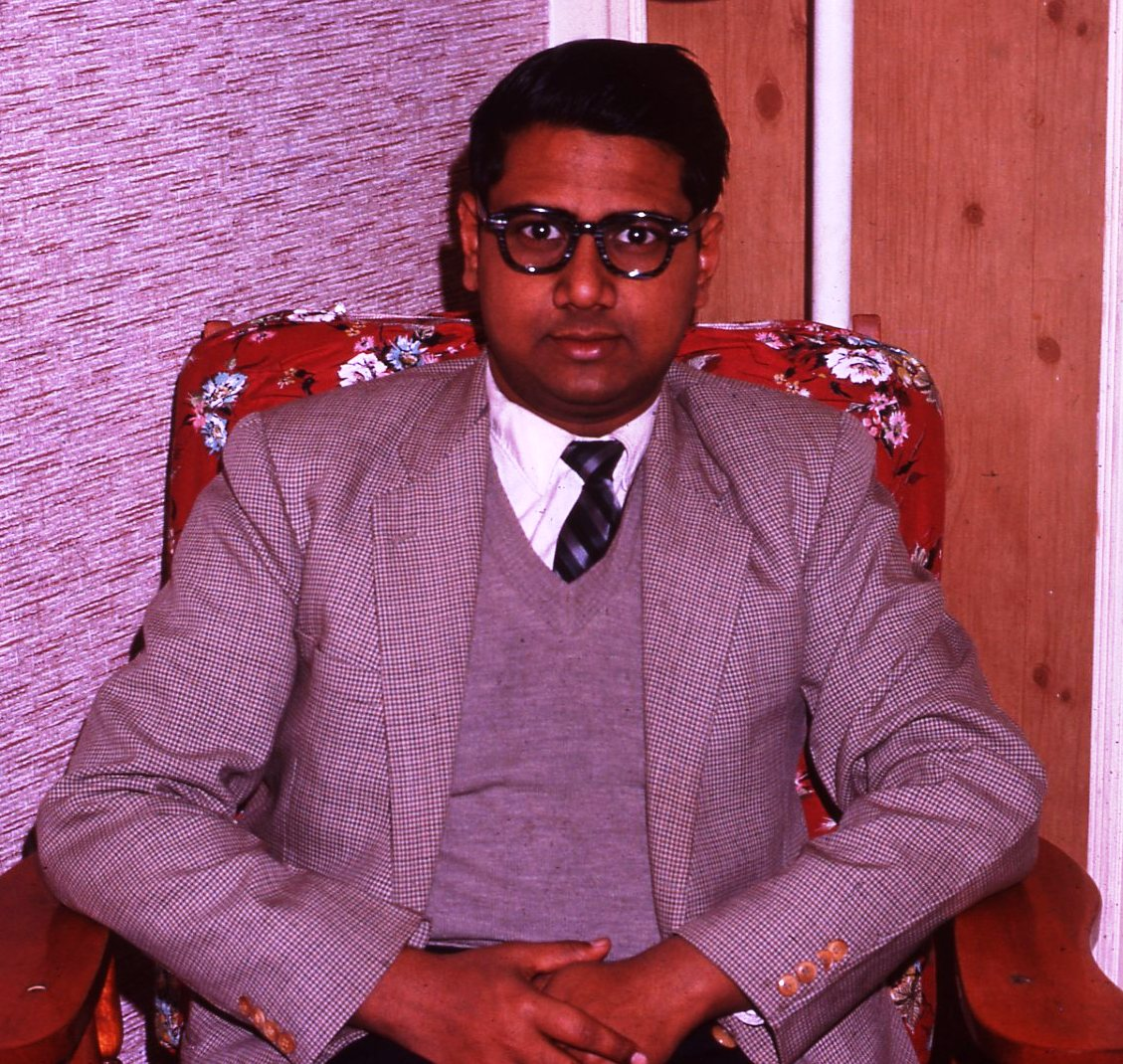
Arjun Sengupta circa 1963

== Government and politics ==
Arjun Sengupta joined the Government of India in the early 1970s, assisting top policymakers such as P.N. Dhar and Sukhomoy Chakravarty build an alliance with the nascent state of Bangladesh. Later in the 1970s, he worked in Commerce Ministry under then Commerce Minister, Pranab Mukherjee. In his stint at the Prime Minister's Office in the early 1980s, Sengupta was reportedly unhappy about India's 1982 loan from the International Monetary Fund (IMF), and wanted more to be done for agriculture and small farmers. At this time, he also steered two important groups: the Narsimhan Committee, which created the architecture of disbanding quantitative controls and replacing them with tariff and fiscal steps, and also the Sengupta Committee on public sector reform. Sengupta was a proponent of the need for an arms-length relationship with the political authority in public sector units (PSUs). However, while Sengupta was a market reformer, his vision was different than what was in currency at the time in the international financial institutions. Yoginder Alagh, a former Union Minister and Sengupta's longtime colleague and friend, said that the reforms championed by Sengupta at the time "were our own, not big bang IMF/World Bank reform initiatives."

Upon his return to India in 1993 (from the US, where he was with the IMF, and Brussels, where he was posted as India's Ambassador to the EC), Sengupta was appointed Member Secretary of the Planning Commission, under then Deputy chairman, Pranab Mukherjee. According to veteran journalist Rajesh Mahapatra, Mukherjee had become the rallying point for those in the Congress party that were critical of the market reform policies of then Finance Minister, Manmohan Singh. As Member Secretary of the Planning Commission, Sengupta brought together a group of left-wing economists to prepare a critical mid-term appraisal that highlighted the downside of economic liberalisation. With this act, Mahapatra said, "Sengupta ended up on the wrong side of history. The finance ministry prevailed over Prime Minister Narasimha Rao to stop the mid-term appraisal from being printed in its original form." In the same article, Mahapatra alleges that Sengupta was subsequently denied many posts for which he was a candidate, including Governor of the Reserve Bank of India, which went to Dr. Bimal Jalan in 1997, and Deputy Chairman of the Planning Commission, which went to Dr. Montek Singh Ahluwalia in 2004.

Another veteran journalist and TV personality, Paranjoy Guha Thakurta, remembered Sengupta in a similar fashion. According to Guha Thakurta, Sengupta's critical stance towards "the neo-liberal school of economic thought subscribed to by Manmohan Singh" and refusal to "cultivate political godfathers" meant that he would be "one Finance Minister India never had." In a published tribute to Sengupta in The Asian Age, his daughter, Mitu Sengupta, described him as "a strong, principled and self-made man, a visionary and true egalitarian," and someone "who could be neither bullied nor bought."

== Work as Chairman of the National Commission for Enterprises in the Unorganized Sector ==
Upon his death, various published tributes to Dr. Arjun Sengupta indicated that his most significant contribution was the final report he produced as the head of the National Commission for Enterprises in the Unorganized Sector (NCEUS), a cabinet-rank position that he held from 2005 to 2009. This report, released in April 2009, revealed that, despite many years of economic growth, 77% of India's population continues to live on less than $2 per day (currently around Rs. 120/day), and that as much as 86% of India's workforce is in the unorganised sector. The report also revealed that the vast majority of India's 'Poor and Vulnerable' are Muslim or lower caste, and thus in addition to poverty, also suffer from social discrimination. According to the report: "These groups emerge as a sort of a coalition of socially discriminated, educationally deprived and economically destitute" while "less than one fourth" of India's population is enjoying the fruits of high economic growth. Under Sengupta's Chairmanship, the NCEUS produced a total of ten reports in addition to submitting a number of proposals and working papers on selected issues, such as the global economic crisis, the informal economy, Special Economic Zones, and street vendors.

Critical of existing government policy, the NCEUS pointed out that although enormous funds had been allocated and spent on social development programs, the benefits largely bypassed the poorest of the poor. It suggested designing special schemes for the vulnerable sections of Indian society through better targeting and social engineering. The commission's recommendations on social security resulted in the enactment of the Unorganized Workers Social Security Act, 2008. Scholars note that the NCEUS anticipated many features of the Social Security Code (2020), particularly regarding the identification of informal workers and the need for universal social protection. Contemporary research continues to rely on the NCEUS framework to analyze informal labour markets, platform work, and social-security gaps.

Recalling Dr. Sengupta's contribution to identifying the cross-linkages between extreme poverty and the downtrodden, C. Rangarajan, Chairman of the Prime Minister's Economic Advisory Council, said: "He had a good understanding of social problems and was deeply involved in finding solutions for people at the bottom of the population pile." Another of Sengupta's admirers, the Vice-President of India, Mohammad Hamid Ansari, said that the "Sengupta report on the unorganised sector is a guiding force to provide minimum social security for all unorganised workers."

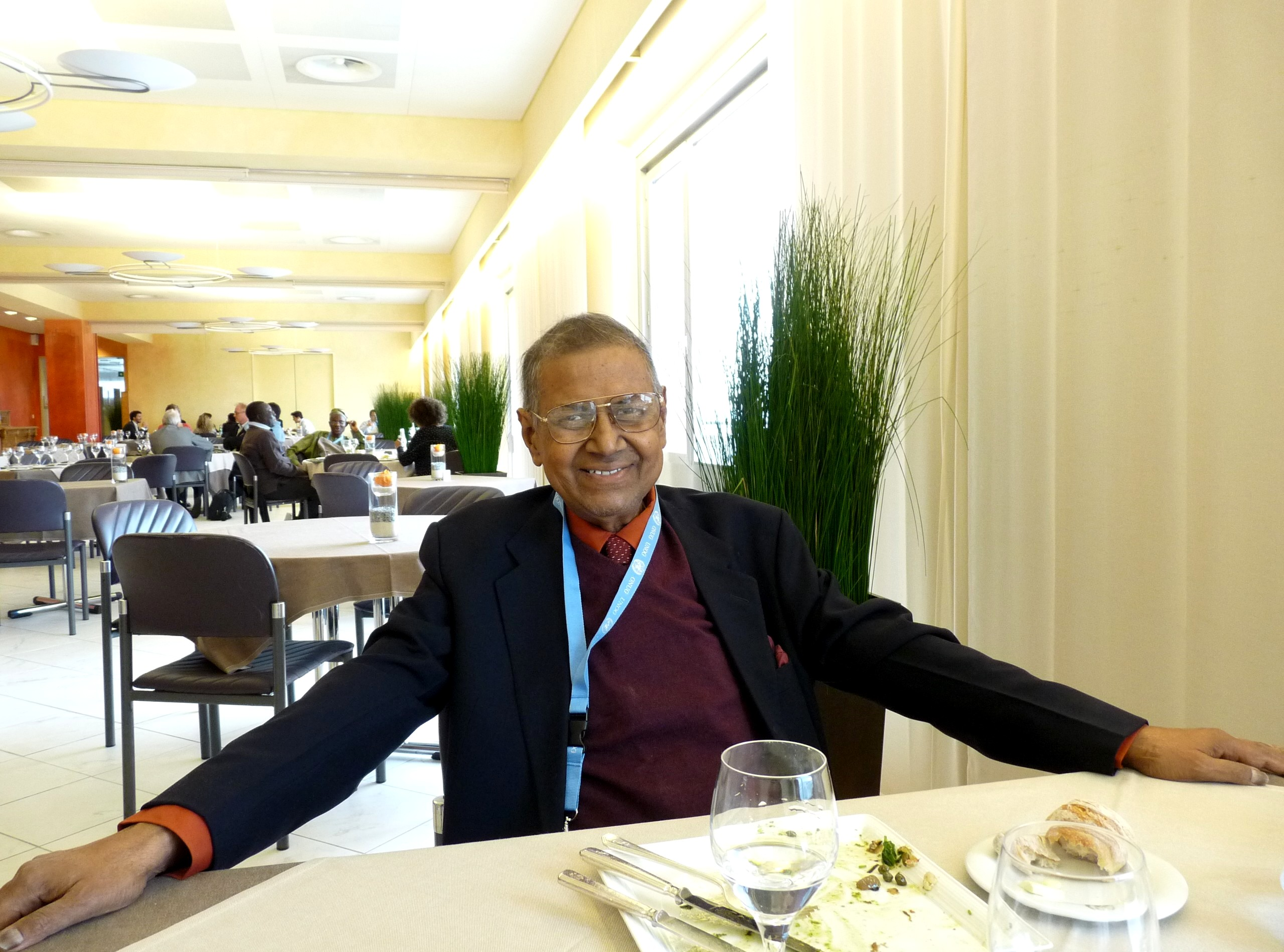
Arjun Sengupta at the UN Delegates' Restaurant in Geneva April 2010

== Work on the Rights-Based Approach to Development ==
In 1999, Arjun Sengupta became the Independent Expert on the Right to Development (RTD) for the United Nations Commission on Human Rights. He produced six reports on the Right to development between 1999 and 2004. These reports elaborated on the 'Declaration of the Right to Development' adopted by the UN in 1986 (the US cast the lone dissenting vote). He also wrote a number of academic papers on the subject, and with the support of Harvard University, implemented two large projects in South Asia. In his subsequent role as the UN's Independent Expert on Human Rights and Extreme Poverty, he wrote as many as six reports, including a mission report on extreme poverty in the United States. Sengupta founded the Centre for Development and Human Rights (CDHR), a non-profit organisation that has produced numerous papers, reports and volumes on the rights-based approach to development, including an edited volume, Reflections on the Right to Development, produced in 2005.

According to Ravi Srivastava, Professor of Economics and Jawaharlal Nehru University, "Sengupta's contributions to the right to development constitute... a very significant contribution to the ongoing debate in India on the rights-based approach." Srivastava says that Sengupta's reports provide a "formidable basis" for arguing that positive rights and collective rights are possible. Sengupta argued that the enforceability of collective rights via the implementation of development programs was possible even without their being converted into legal rights (though he recognised that justiciability did remain a superior course of action).

The right to development was linked to a path of development in which national governments were obliged to ensure that human rights were progressively realised. But international organisations were also seen as having an important role. In a seminal article published in India's Economic and Political Weekly in 2001, Sengupta argued that: "When development is seen as a human right, it obligates the authorities, both nationally and internationally, to fulfill their duties in delivering (or in human rights language, promoting, securing, and protecting) that right in a country. The adoption of appropriate policies follows from that obligation. Nationally, the government must do everything, or must be seen as doing everything to fulfill the claims of a human right. If the right to food, education, health are regarded as components of a human right to development, the state has to accept the primary responsibility of delivering the right either on its own or in collaboration with others. It has to adopt the appropriate policies and provide for the required resources to facilitate such delivery because meeting the obligation of human rights would have a primary claim on all the resources — physical, financial and institutional — that it can command."
