= United Nations Research Institute for Social Development =

Research institute of the United Nations

- Abbreviation: UNRISD
- Formation: 1 August 1963; 63 years ago
- Type: Research institute
- Legal status: Active
- Headquarters: Geneva, Switzerland
- Head: Director; Magdalena Sepúlveda Carmona
- Parent organization: United Nations Economic and Social Council
- Website: www.unrisd.org

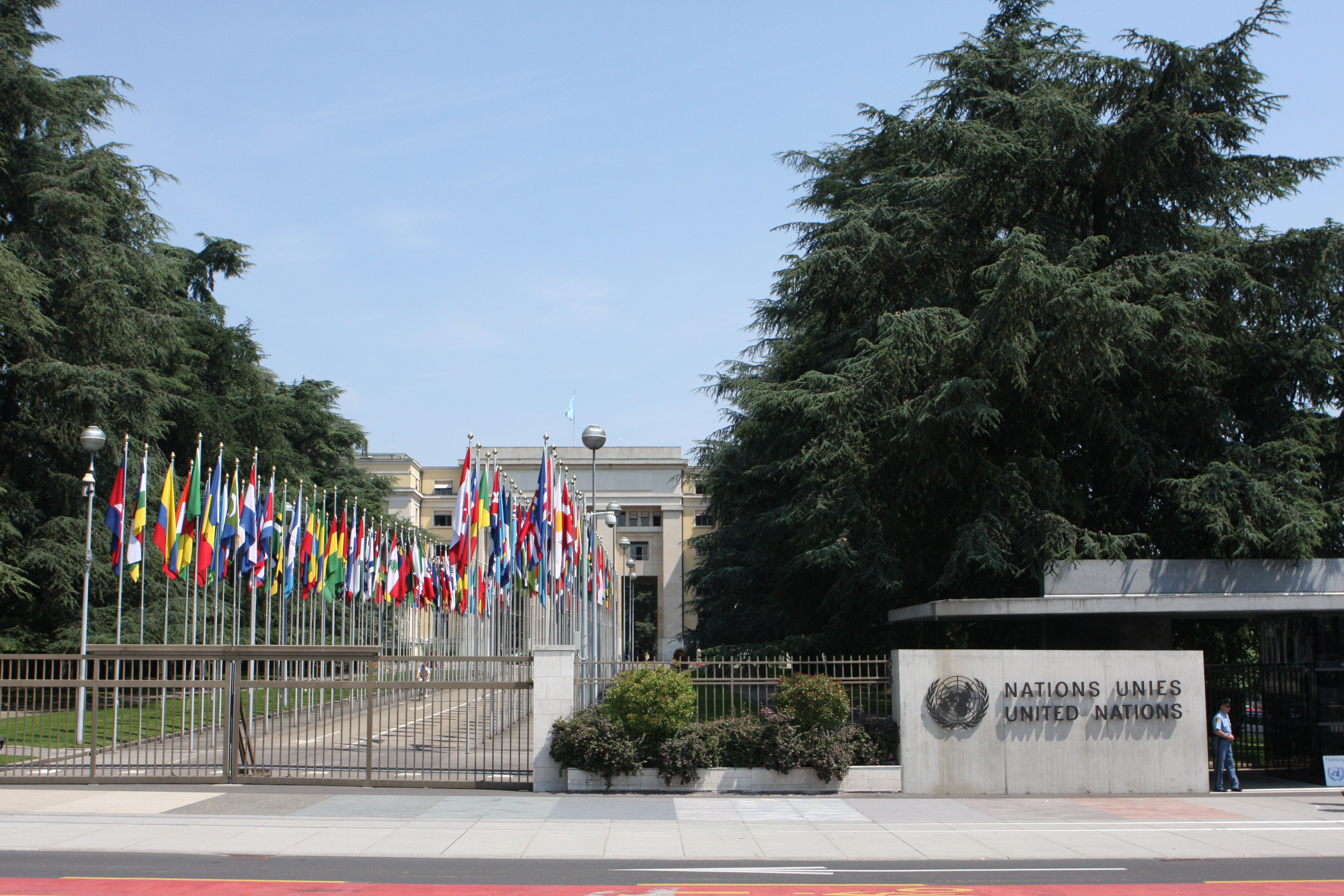
UNRISD is based at the United Nations Office at Geneva.

The United Nations Research Institute for Social Development (UNRISD) is "an autonomous research institute within the United Nations that undertakes multidisciplinary research and policy analysis on the social dimensions of contemporary development issues". UNRISD was established in 1963 with the mandate of conducting policy-relevant research on social development that is pertinent to the work of the United Nations Secretariat, regional commissions and specialized agencies, and national institutions.

A small team of researchers coordinates UNRISD's research programmes, which focus primarily on the developing world, working in collaboration with national research teams from local universities and research institutes. The Institute's work takes a holistic, multidisciplinary and political economy approach. UNRISD's location at the United Nations Office at Geneva gives researchers access to channels of policy influence through active participation in events, meetings, conferences and working groups.

== History ==
UNRISD was established in 1963 "to conduct research into problems and policies of social development, and relationships between various types of social development and economic development". It was originally set up with a grant from the Government of the Netherlands, and its first Board Chair was the eminent economist Jan Tinbergen, who received the first-ever Nobel Prize for economics in 1969.

UNRISD's initial research focused on the design of indicators to measure development not just in terms of economic growth but also social factors, such as nutrition, health and education. As such, it employed many statisticians in its early years. Another early project focused on cooperatives as a tool for development, which produced some controversial results.

In the 1970s, global population growth made food production, supply and eventually food systems into a key topic in development. UNRISD's work on the so-called Green Revolution (the introduction of newly bred high-yield grain seeds to increase food production) took a typically critical view. It highlighted the fact that the quantity of food available was only one factor in ensuring populations in developing countries were not subject to hunger. Power inequalities impacting on the distribution of foodstuffs played a key role in determining who got enough to eat and who didn't.

By the 1980s, UNRISD was growing in size, in terms of both funding and staffing. Its remit diversified to cover popular participation and refugee issues, gradually leaving some of its early preoccupation with statistics behind.

In the 1990s UNRISD thrived. A wide range of topics were addressed, ranging from political violence to the socioeconomic impact of illicit drugs. Globalization in the modern era and structural adjustment programmes in developing countries brought about social crises which UNRISD researched and criticized, arguing that unregulated markets required a healthy public sector and stable governance to function properly.

Environmental issues took firm root in development debates during this decade. UNRISD's take was typically critical: whatever the benefits of conservation, it was often happening at the expense of social justice and the livelihoods of minorities.

In the 2000s, as globalization continued apace and social dimensions began to be re-introduced in the face of the sometimes catastrophic impacts of wide-ranging economic liberalization, UNRISD criticized a narrow social policy focus on safety nets and the targeting of vulnerable groups, arguing instead in favour of universal transformative social policy.

In the 2010s, the adoption of the 2030 Agenda for Sustainable Development by UN member states in 2015 established new global roadmap for development. UNRISD continued to work on social policy, often in conjunction with questions related to the 2030 Agenda. It also took up the new issue of the social and solidarity economy (SSE) and its contribution to sustainable development. Output on gender issues since 2016 fell due to a lack of gender capacity in-house following staff restructuring. Environmental issues are re-emerging as a key area of work, especially as they relate to social policy and climate justice.

In October 2025, as part of the UN80 Initiative, Secretary-General António Guterres proposed to the General Assembly that the UN's training and research bodies be consolidated into two pillars, including by integrating UNRISD into the United Nations University (UNU). According to UN80 briefing materials of February 2026, UNRISD would become a new research institute of UNU while preserving its academic freedom, research independence and the intent of its existing funding arrangements. The integration proposal was to be reviewed by the UNRISD Board and the UNU Council in mid-2026. The General Assembly was briefed on the proposals on 27 February 2026.

== UNRISD themes and projects ==
The current research agenda is shaped by three major contemporary development challenges: inequalities, conflict and unsustainable practices. It consists of three programmes:

- Social Policy and Development
- Gender and Development
- Social Dimensions of Sustainable Development

These programmes pursue a variety of projects including the following, some of which are recently completed, others are still underway:

- Understanding Gender-Egalitarian Policy Change: When and Why Do States Respond to Women's Claims-Making? (2010–2014)
- Politics of Domestic Resource Mobilization for Social Development (2011–2018)
- Potential and Limits of Social and Solidarity Economy (2012–2013)
- New Directions in Social Policy: Alternatives from and for the Global South (2013–2018)
- Innovations in Care Policies (2015–2016)
- Valueworks: Effects of Financialization along the Copper Value Chain (2017–2018)
- Social and Solidarity Economy for the SDGs: Spotlight on the Social Economy in Seoul (2017–2018)
- Just Transition Research Collaborative Phase 1 (2018)
- SSE Knowledge Hub for the SDGs (2018–2019)
- Overcoming Inequalities in a Fractured World: Between Elite Power and Social Mobilization (2018–2020)
- Sustainable Development Performance Indicators (2018–2022)
- Transformative Adaptation to Climate Change in Coastal Cities (2019)
- South-South Migration, Inequality and Development Hub (2019–2023)

UNRISD has recently introduced a new way of sourcing projects in the form of an "Ideas Incubator", in which it actively seeks partners to expand its research portfolio.

== Publications ==
UNRISD makes its research widely available through books (in partnership with publishers like Routledge, Palgrave Macmillan and Wiley Blackwell), research papers and occasional papers (which are peer-reviewed) and working papers (which are not peer-reviewed). UNRISD researchers also regularly contribute articles to scholarly journals. These publications are typically of interest to an academic audience.

Other publications target an audience of policy-makers, programme designers and decision-makers. These take the form of briefs, whether research and policy briefs, or briefs concerning a specific project, issue or event.

UNRISD maintains on online open access repository with over 1300 publications, in the form of the publications section of its website. The majority of items published after 1990 can be downloaded free of charge. Others are books which can be obtained from the publisher.

Some of these publications have received international recognition, success and incorporation into major global debates. UNRISD regularly publishes flagship reports which synthesize a significant body of recent research.

=== Key publications: Flagship reports ===
- UNRISD. 2016. Policy Innovations for Transformative Change: Implementing the 2030 Agenda for Sustainable Development. UNRISD, Geneva
- UNRISD. 2010. Combating Poverty and Inequality: Structural Change, Social Policy and Politics. UNRISD, Geneva
- UNRISD. 2005. Gender Equality: Striving for Justice in an Unequal World. UNRISD. Geneva
- UNRISD. 2000. Visible Hands: Taking Responsibility for Social Development. UNRISD, Geneva
- UNRISD. 1995. States of Disarray: The Social Effects of Globalization. UNRISD, Geneva

== UNRISD events ==
UNRISD frequently convenes conferences and seminars, as a means of refining and developing its research and to disseminate its findings. Its events are often closely linked with its policy impact, being the forums where development policy makers and practitioners can come into contact with academics working on social development.

=== Recent major UNRISD conferences ===
In November 2018 UNRISD held a major international conference in Geneva which convened innovative research from the global South and North. The title of the conference was "Overcoming Inequalities in a Fractured World: Between Elite Power and Social Mobilization". Keynote speeches were given by François Bourguignon and Vandana Shiva. The conference was preceded by a roundtable discussing whether elites are the engines of inequalities, featuring Naila Kabeer (London School of Economics), Saskia Sassen (Columbia University) and Jomo Kwame Sundaram (Council of Eminent Persons, Malaysia).

As part of the celebrations of its 50th anniversary, UNRISD co-hosted a conference with the ILO (International Labour Organization) in 2013 entitled "The Potential and Limits of the Social and Solidarity Economy". The conference featured prominent speakers such as Guy Ryder, Jose Luis Coraggio, Paul Singer and Sarah Cook. Over 40 academics presented research findings to about 400 participants. There were several side events including a PhD poster session, book presentations, a practitioners' forum, movie screenings and a special session on alternative finance and complementary currencies hosted by the UN-NGLS.

In 2011, UNRISD organized a conference held in Geneva on climate change as a social development issue called "Green Economy and Sustainable Development: Bringing Back the Social Dimension". The conference created a forum for developing a conceptual and policy framework to position social dimensions at the centre of green economy and sustainable development. Policy reports and other publications prepared for this conference informed the United Nations Conference on Sustainable Development (Rio+20) preparatory process and subsequent policy discussions.

=== Seminar Series ===
In addition to its international conferences, UNRISD organises a regular Seminar Series to provide a space for open, informed and insightful conversation around contemporary issues of concern to social development research and policy. Recent seminars have included:

- Blockchain for Inclusive and Sustainable Development: Fact or Fantasy? - Helen Hai (Blockchain Charity Foundation and UNIDO Goodwill Ambassador); Ivonne Higuero (UNECE); Leander Bindewald (MONNETA / Network for Monetary Diversity)
- Changing Course for Sustainable Development: Bold Alternatives to Business as Usual - Gita Sen (DAWN); Kate Donald (Center for Economic and Social Rights); Sandra Vermuyten (Public Services International); Ziad Abdel Samad (Arab NGO Network for Development)
- The Challenge of Leaving No One Behind: Securing Political Commitment for Inclusive Development - David Hulme (academic) (University of Manchester); Sam Hickey (University of Manchester); Sohela Nazneen (Institute of Development Studies, UK)
- Towards a Post-Neoliberal World Order: Rebuilding Human Rights-Based Multilateralism - Jeremy Corbyn (MP, United Kingdom); Arancha Gonzalez (Executive Director International Trade Centre); Nikhil Seth (Executive Director UNITAR)

== Outreach and communication ==
In recent years, UNRISD's outreach and communication strategy has focused on four core objectives:

- Increase the visibility of UNRISD as an institution;
- Promote the use of its research findings;
- Translate research findings into strong messages that can be communicated to a range of audiences;
- Document and communicate the impact of UNRISD work.

Communication of the research findings has proven to be a key component in strengthening the ultimate purpose and impact of UNRISD activities as well as increasing recognition and use of UNRISD research by the UN system, academia, civil society, and funding bodies.

UNRISD is currently active on LinkedIn, Facebook and Twitter; on the last of these it has recently reached 31,000 followers. UNRISD also produces multimedia material as a means of making seminars and conferences available through online videos and podcasts

== Policy influence and impacts ==
UNRISD's position within the UN system allows it a significant degree of policy influence, while its governance structure and funding situation (see below) give it more latitude for independence than other UN entities enjoy. Its staff serve on UN system-wide committees, task forces and expert groups, and undertake collaborative research with other UN agencies.

UNRISD's independent international events, conferences, seminars and symposiums (see above) are held in order to discuss and present research findings and debates in select fields of focus. These events often draw in the participation of local and international NGOs, government representatives, the media, universities and other research institutes, as well as individual researchers and academics. UNRISD events have also been co-hosted and co-organized with co-operating universities, NGOs and local governments. This extensive cooperation with social development stakeholders is one of the Institute's key channels of policy influence and impact.

In 2014, UNRISD published a brochure detailing the impact of its work in terms of its agenda-setting capacity, its multiple spheres of influence, and its networking and capacity building.

== UNRISD Staffing Structure ==
UNRISD has a small core staff, located in Geneva, Switzerland, which coordinates an international network of collaborating researchers. Collaboration with UNRISD may take one of several forms. Original research may be directly commissioned for a centrally coordinated research project. Alternatively, researchers can respond to a Call for Papers and submit research already underway for publication as part of an UNRISD project. UNRISD also publishes think pieces on its website by collaborating scholars.

UNRISD's network of currently active collaborating researchers numbers over 400, with a large proportion from the global South.

== Governance ==
UNRISD is overseen by a Board, headed by a Chairperson who is appointed by the UN Secretary-General. Board members are selected based on their expertise and qualifications, and membership is confirmed by the UN Economic and Social Council (ECOSOC). Board members participate in their individual capacity and do not represent UN member states. The Board reports to the Commission for Social Development biennially.

Chairs of the Board

- Jan Tinbergen, Netherlands (1963–1974)
- H.M.A. Onitiri, Nigeria (1975)
- (Ivory Coast) M.T. Diawara, Côte d'Ivoire (1976–1982)
- K.A. Naqvi, India (1977)
- Gustavo Esteva, Mexico (1983)
- Paul-Marc Henry, France (1984–1988)
- Keith Griffin, United Kingdom (1989–1994)
- Juan Somavia, Chile (1995–1997)
- Emma Rothschild, United Kingdom (1998–2005)
- Lourdes Arizpe, Mexico (2006–2011)
- Maureen O'Neil, Canada (2012–2017)
- Joakim Palme, Sweden (2017–present)

Directors

The Director reports to both the Board and to ECOSOC via the Commission for Social Development. The Director is responsible for UNRISD's research activities, fundraising and external relations with the UN secretariat, senior UN officials, specialized agencies, donors and other research entities. Directors are also actively engaged in research.

- Jan F. de Jongh (1964–1967)
- Donald V. McGranahan (1967–1977)
- Solon L. Barraclough (1977–1984)
- Enrique J. Oteiza (1984–1987)
- Dharam Ghai (1987–1997)
- Thandika Mkandawire (1998–2009)
- Sarah Cook (2009–2015)
- Paul Ladd (2015–2024)
- Magdalena Sepúlveda Carmona (2024–Present)

== Funding ==
UNRISD relies wholly on voluntary funding from governments, development agencies and foundations, receiving no funding from the United Nations budget. This arrangement, while fluctuant, at the same time guarantees the Institute's independent status and gives it a certain critical latitude.

The following governments have contributed to UNRISD over the past 50 years: Australia, Austria, Canada, Cuba, Cyprus, Denmark, Finland, France, Germany, Hungary, Iran, Iraq, Italy, Jamaica, Mexico, the Netherlands, Nicaragua, Norway, the Republic of Korea, Sweden, Switzerland, the United Kingdom, the United States of America and Yugoslavia.
