= Commission on Legal Empowerment of the Poor =

UN-backed group promoting legal rights for the poor

Organization logo

The Commission on Legal Empowerment of the Poor was an independent international commission, hosted by the United Nations Development Programme (UNDP), and established in 2005 as the "first global initiative to focus on the link between exclusion, poverty, and the law". Drawing on three years of research and consultations, the Commission proposed strategies for creating inclusive development initiatives that would empower those living in poverty through increased protections and rights.

The Commission's final 2008 report, Making the Law Work for Everyone, argued that as many as 4 billion people worldwide are "robbed of the chance to better their lives and climb out of poverty, because they are excluded from the rule of law". In response, the report proposed four “pillars” for legal empowerment of the poor, which, the Commission argued, would enable those living in poverty to become partners in, rather than passive recipients of, development programs. These four pillars are: access to justice and the rule of law, property rights, labor rights, and business rights.

Upon concluding its work and producing its final report, the Commission on Legal Empowerment of the Poor ceased to exist. The commission's findings gave rise to a number of initiatives, including UNDP's Initiative on Legal Empowerment of the Poor (created in 2008), the Justice for the Poor program at the World Bank (started in 2009), work on Legal Empowerment as part of the Justice Initiative of the Open Society Foundations and more recently the creation of the Global Legal Empowerment Network (2012) and the Legal Empowerment Fund (2020).

A high-level event held in 2018 at the start of the 73rd United Nations General Assembly, marked the tenth anniversary of Making the Law Work for Everyone. It lauded the Commission's work as a foundation for the then newly formed Task Force on Justice, created to develop an agenda to realize 'access to justice for all' by 2030, as defined in Sustainable Development Goal 16.

== History of Legal Empowerment of the Poor ==
The concept of Legal Empowerment, and the work of the Commission, was grounded in the ideas of Hernando de Soto and his book The Mystery of Capital. The central idea is that the way that the law and the justice sector operate in society is critical to economic growth, yet often overlooked by economists. In the words of the Commission: "The legal underpinnings of entrepreneurship, employment and market interaction are often taken for granted by traditional approaches to development and standard economic theory." Unequal access to justice systems, other forms of dispute resolution, and public services translates to unequal access to economic prosperity and therefore multiplies inequality.

Development scholars such as Dan Banik argued that “the relationship between law and development in the international development discourse was traditionally very narrowly focused on law, lawyers and state institutions.” The result, more often than not, was a “top-down” approach to development, in which aid initiatives often overlooked or excluded the voices of the very people they intended to help. Legal empowerment of the poor, by contrast, sought to bring excluded voices into the development discussion, while at the same time working to expand protections afforded to those living in poverty. Stephen Golub, one of the scholars in the field, argued that legal empowerment “puts community-driven and rights-based development into effect by offering concrete mechanisms, involving but not limited to legal services, that alleviate poverty, advance the rights of the disadvantaged, and make the rule of law more of a reality for them”.

Drawing upon these principles and bolstered by the UN's Millennium Development Goals, the mission on Legal Empowerment of the Poor emerged as an effort to connect work on access to justice, the rule of law and human rights on the one hand, to efforts to reduce poverty and promote economic growth on the other hand.

== Founding of the Commission ==
The Commission on Legal Empowerment of the Poor, co-chaired by former U.S. Secretary of State Madeleine Albright and Hernando de Soto, Peruvian economist and founder of the Institute for Liberty and Democracy (ILD), was launched in 2005 by a group of developing and industrialized countries including Canada, Denmark, Egypt, Finland, Guatemala, Iceland, India, Norway, Sweden, South Africa, Tanzania and the United Kingdom, and completed its work in 2008.

== Members ==
The Commission on Legal Empowerment of the Poor was made up of influential policymakers and practitioners from around the world who were believed to be well-positioned to advocate among their peers for legal reforms in developing countries.

=== Commissioners ===
- Fazle Hasan Abed, Founder and Chairperson, BRAC, Bangladesh
- Lloyd Axworthy, former Minister of Foreign Affairs for Canada
- Leszek Balcerowicz, President of the National Bank of Poland
- Lakhdar Brahimi, former Special Representative to the U.N. Secretary-General
- Gordon Brown, Prime Minister, United Kingdom
- Fernando Cardoso, former President of Brazil
- Shirin Ebadi, Nobel Peace Prize Laureate, Iran
- Ashraf Ghani, Dean of Kabul University and former Minister of Finance for Afghanistan
- Prince Hassan bin Talal, President of the Club of Rome
- Muhammad Medhat Hassanein, former Minister of Finance for Egypt
- Hilde Frafjord Johnson, former Minister of International Development, Norway
- Anthony Kennedy, Associate Justice, United States Supreme Court
- Allan Larsson, former Minister of Finance for Sweden
- Clotilde Aniouvi Medegan Nougbode, President of the High Court of Benin
- Benjamin Mkapa, former President of the United Republic of Tanzania
- Mike Moore, former Prime Minister of New Zealand, former Director General of the WTO
- Milinda Moragoda, former Minister of Economic Reforms, Science and Technology, Sri Lanka
- Syed Tanwir H. Naqvi, former Chairman of the National Reconstruction Bureau of Pakistan
- Mary Robinson, former President of Ireland and former High Commissioner of Human Rights
- Arjun Kumar Sengupta, Chairman of the National Commission for Enterprises in the Unorganized Sector of India, United Nations Independent Expert on Human Rights and Extreme Poverty
- Lindiwe Sisulu, Minister of Housing, Republic of South Africa
- Lawrence Summers, President of Harvard University, USA
- Erna Witoelar, UN Special Ambassador for MDGs in Asia & the Pacific
- Ernesto Zedillo, former President of Mexico

=== Board of Advisers ===
- Robert Annibale, Global Director of Microfinance, Citigroup
- Marek Belka, Executive Secretary of the United Nations Economic Commission for Europe (UNECE)
- Diego Hidalgo, Founder, Club of Madrid
- Donald Kaberuka, President, African Development Bank Group
- Jean Lemierre, President, European Bank for Reconstruction and Development
- Luis Alberto Moreno, President, Inter-American Development Bank
- Kumi Naidoo, CEO, CIVICUS
- Sheela Patel, Founder, Society for the Promotion of Area Resources (SPARC)
- Jan Peterson, Chair, Huairou Commission
- Juan Somavia, Director, International Labor Organization
- Anna Tibaijuka, Executive Director, UN HABITAT
- Victoria Tauli-Corpuz, Chairperson, UN Permanent Forum on Indigenous Issues
- John Watson, President, CARE Canada
- Francisco Garza Zambrano, President, Cemex North America
- Robert Zoellick, President, World Bank

== Organization ==
Advocates of legal empowerment argued that it was imperative to learn from those who live and work in slums and settlements around the world. Thus, the Commission on Legal Empowerment of the Poor, in conducting its research, partnered with grassroots organizations, governments and institutions to hear about the legal challenges faced by the poor. 22 National and Regional Consultations were hosted in Africa, South and Central Americas, Asia, the Middle East and Europe. These national and regional processes grounded the work of Legal Empowerment in local realities, and contributed to recommendations that reflected diverse cultural, socio-economic and political environments.

The Commission on Legal Empowerment of the Poor's final report, Making The Law Work For Everyone, argued that legal empowerment initiatives must be grounded in four foundational “pillars”:

•Access to Justice: including the right to legal identity, removal of discriminatory laws against the poor, and increased access to both traditional and alternative justice systems

•Property rights: including recognition of alternative methods of individual and collective ownership

•Labor rights: workers’ rights, protections, and benefits

•Business rights: access to credit and support for the poor (particularly poor women) to start and operate small businesses

Five technical working groups were established to create input reports for the Commission's final report, focusing on Access to Justice, Property Rights, Labour Rights, Business Rights and Roadmaps for Implementation of Reforms. The findings of each of the working groups were published as chapters in the final report Making the Law Work for Everyone - Volume II.

The final chapter of the report Making the Law Work for Everyone, includes implementation strategies, with a range of recommendations and proposals for follow-up activities, including the idea to develop a global ombudsman or global 'Defenders of the Poor'.

== Critiques of the Commission ==
Though scholars and practitioners of legal empowerment programs applaud the Commission on Legal Empowerment of the Poor for bringing legal empowerment of the poor into the international limelight, a number of critiques have been published of its 2008 report on both technical and theoretical grounds. For example, Matthew Stephens, in his article "The Commission on Legal Empowerment of the Poor: An Opportunity Missed," argued that the Report lacked sufficient empirical data. Julio Faundez argued that the Commission's policy recommendations were too vague to be implemented effectively.
