= Amal Aloy =

Amal Aloy is a daily political cartoon strip published in Sangbad Pratidin for over a decade. It is drawn by veteran Bengali cartoonist Amal Chakrabarti.
