= Dola Sen =

Indian politician and trade unionist

Member of Parliament, Rajya Sabha
- Incumbent
- Assumed office 29 August 2017
- Preceded by: Srinjoy Bose

National Secretary of All India Trinamool Congress
- Incumbent
- Assumed office 5 June 2026 Serving with Derek O'Brien
- Chairperson: Mamata Banerjee

President Indian National Trinamool Trade Union Congress
- In office 1 June 2021 – 2 June 2026
- Preceded by: Subrata Mukherjee

Personal details
- Born: 26 March 1967 (age 59) Kolkata, West Bengal, India
- Party: Trinamool Congress (until 2026); Mamata All India Trinamool Congress (from 2026)

Dola Sen (born 26 March 1967) is an Indian politician and trade unionist. She is now the Joint Secretary of Mamata All India Trinamool Congress . From 2020 to till 2026 she was the central president of the Indian National Trinamool Trade Union Congress (INTTUC).

She has completed her B.Sc. (Mathematics) from Calcutta University, Kolkata in year 1990. She resides at Rajarhat.

She was fielded by the All India Trinamool Congress as its candidate for the Asansol Lok Sabha seat in the 2014 Indian general election.

She was elected to Rajya Sabha the Upper House of Indian Parliament from West Bengal.

On 21 September 2020, Dola Sen along with seven other members were suspended from the Rajya Sabha for their unruly behaviour in the house by tearing documents, breaking mics, standing on tables and heckling the Deputy Chairman of the Rajya Sabha. Their actions were condemned by several leaders.
