= Ananda S. Bandyopadhyay =

Indian-American epidemiologist

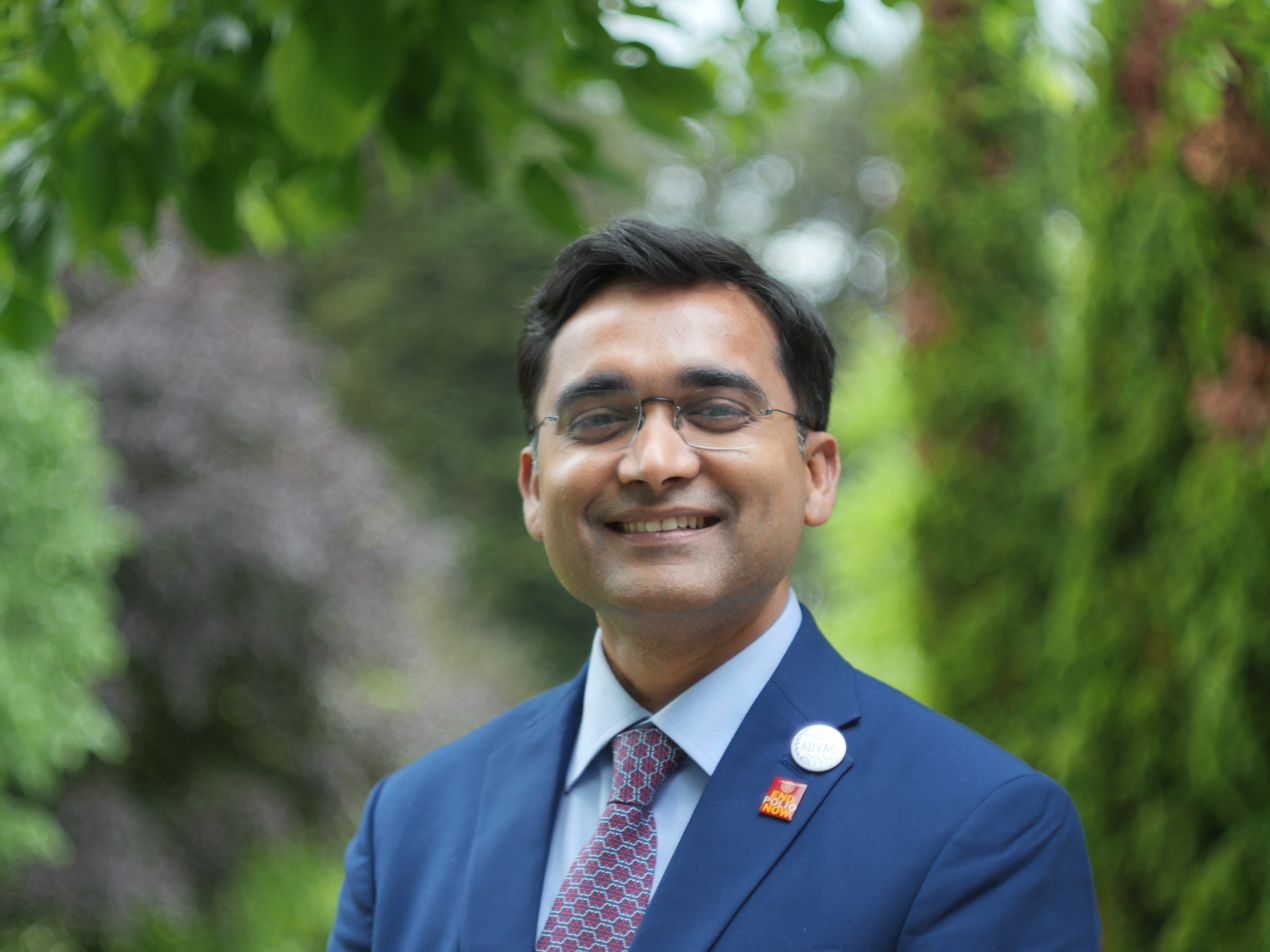
- Born: Kolkata
- Education: Harvard University, Calcutta National Medical College
- Years active: 2006-present
- Employer: Gates Foundation
- Awards: IVI-SK bioscience Park MahnHoon Award

Ananda S. Bandyopadhyay is an Indian-American doctor and epidemiologist working on disease eradication. He is currently the Deputy Director of the Gates Foundation's Polio program. He assisted with the development and deployment of the nOPV2 vaccine, which is credited with reducing risk of poliovirus outbreaks.

== Early life and education ==
Bandyopadhyay was born in a middle-class Bengali family in Behala, Kolkata, West Bengal. His father was a scientist with the Government of West Bengal.

He did his higher secondary education from St. Xavier's Collegiate School, Kolkata and completed his MBBS from the Calcutta National Medical College & Hospital, winning multiple honors certificates and a gold medal in otorhinolaryngology.

In 2010, he completed his master's degree in public health, specialising in global health from the Harvard School of Public Health.

== Career ==
Bandyopadhyay joined the National Polio Surveillance Project of the World Health Organisation (WHO) in 2006 as a Surveillance Medical Officer. Here, he worked across many of the remotest parts of North-East and North India, investigating outbreaks for infectious diseases such as polio, measles, and H5N1, while organising large-scale vaccination drives

After graduating from Harvard University, he joined the Rhode Island Department of Health as a public health epidemiologist. Here, he led surveillance initiatives focusing on respiratory illnesses and zoonotic diseases, investigated disease outbreaks, and coordinated successful response strategies.

Bandyopadhyay joined the Gates Foundation's Global Development division in 2012. He has led major global initiatives advancing research and development efforts for polio eradication.

In 2020, he co-chaired a global effort to roll out the novel Oral Polio Vaccine type-2 (nOPV2), the first vaccine to be authorized under the WHO Emergency Use Listing (EUL), designed to facilitate response options for Public Health Emergencies of International Concern (PHEIC). He led the clinical development and field deployment of the vaccine, working with major health and research institutes around the world. As of November 2025, more than 2 billion doses of nOPV2 have been administered across 40 countries to interrupt variant poliovirus outbreaks.

From 2011 to 2024, Bandyopadhyay was a guest speaker at the Harvard School of Public Health. He is a scientific committee member and guest faculty at the Advanced Course in Vaccinology (ADVAC), Annecy, France. He is also engaged as an adjunct faculty for major academic programs in vaccinology and global health in countries such as India, Italy, and the United States.

== Personal life ==
Bandyopadhyay is married to Sohini. They live in Seattle with their two children.

== Awards ==
In 2025, he was awarded the Park MahnHoon Award by the International Vaccine Institute SK bioscience for his contribution to the advancement of public health.

Bandyopadhyay was also bestowed with the Bochhorer Best 2025 Award by ABP Group, which recognises Bengalis around the world with exemplary achievements.

The Harvard School of Public Health's Alumni Association bestowed its highest honour, the Award of Merit, upon Bandyopadhyay in 2024.
