= Amar Shankar Sable =

Indian politician

Member of Parliament, Rajya Sabha
- In office 14 March 2015 – 2 April 2020
- Preceded by: Murli Deora
- Succeeded by: Udayanraje Bhosale
- Constituency: Maharashtra

Personal details
- Born: 7 February 1963 (age 63) Baramati, Pune district
- Party: Bharatiya Janata Party
- Spouse: Bharti Sable
- Children: 1 son, 2 daughters
- Parents: Shankar Sable (father); Anasuya Sable (mother)
- Education: Bachelor of Arts; Diploma in Journalism
- Profession: Journalist, Politician

Amar Shankar Sable is a Bharatiya Janata Party (BJP) politician. He is a Member of Parliament, representing Maharashtra in the Rajya Sabha the upper house of Indian Parliament. He is from Pimpri, Pune.
