= María Magdalena Sepúlveda Carmona =

Special Rapporteur on extreme poverty and human rights (2008–14)

Magdalena Sepúlveda Carmona

Director of United Nations Research Institute for Social Development
- Incumbent
- Assumed office 2024

Executive Director of the Global Initiative for Economic, Social and Cultural Rights (GI-ESCR)
- In office 2019–2024

United Nations Special Rapporteur on Extreme Poverty and Human Rights
- In office 2008–2014

Personal details
- Born: 16 March 1971 (age 54) Viña del Mar, Chile
- Education: PhD
- Alma mater: University of Valparaíso; University of Essex; University of Utrecht
- Occupation: Lawyer, researcher, activist

María Magdalena Sepúlveda Carmona (Viña del Mar, 16 March 1971) is a Chilean lawyer, researcher and human rights activist.

Since November 2024, she has been the Director of the United Nations Research Institute for Social Development (UNRISD). Previously, she served as the Executive Director of the Global Initiative for Economic, Social and Cultural Rights (GI-ESCR).

She is a member of the Independent Commission for the Reform of International Corporate Taxation (ICRICT) and the United Nations (UN) High-Level Panel on International Financial Accountability, Transparency, and Integrity for Achieving the 2030 Agenda. Sepúlveda has been a Commissioner since 2014, alongside economists such as Joseph Stiglitz, Wayne Swan, and Thomas Piketty.

== Biography ==
=== Education ===
She completed her secondary education in Viña del Mar.

She studied law at the University of Valparaíso, where she graduated as a lawyer in 1994. She complemented her education with a master's degree in Human Rights Law with distinction from the University of Essex (United Kingdom) in 1999. She obtained diplomas in comparative law from the Pontifical Catholic University of Chile (1996) and in human rights from Carlos III University of Madrid (1998) and the European University Institute (1999). In 2001, she earned her Ph.D. in International Human Rights Law from Utrecht University (Netherlands).

=== Professional Activity ===
From 1999 to 2002 she worked as a researcher at the Netherlands Institute for Human Rights.

In 2002, she served as a staff attorney at the Inter-American Court of Human Rights. From 2002 to 2004, she served as Co-Director of the International Law and Human Rights Program at the University for Peace in San José, Costa Rica.

From 2006 to 2012, she was the Director of Research at the International Council on Human Rights Policy in Geneva.

In March 2008 she was appointed as the United Nations Independent Expert on the question of human rights and extreme poverty by the Human Rights Council, officially assuming her duties on 1 May of that year. In June 2011, the Human Rights Council expanded the mandate on extreme poverty and human rights and changed her title to United Nations Special Rapporteur on Extreme Poverty and Human Rights, making her the first Special Rapporteur on this issue. She held this role until 2014

During her time as Special Rapporteur, Sepúlveda authored the Guiding Principles on Extreme Poverty and Human Rights, which she presented to the Human Rights Council at its 21st session. On September 27, 2012, the Human Rights Council adopted the Principles in resolution 21/11. On 20 December 2012, the UN General Assembly adopted a resolution on human rights and extreme poverty that it "takes note with appreciation of the guiding principles on extreme poverty and human rights, adopted by the Human Rights Council in its resolution 21/11 as a useful tool for States in the formulation and implementation of poverty reduction and eradication policies, as appropriate."

She was a member of the High-Level Panel of Experts on Food Security and Nutrition of the Committee on World Food Security (CFS) of the United Nations on two occasions: from 2013 to 2015 and from 2015 to 2017, serving as a member of the Steering Committee of the panel.

She was a lead researcher at the United Nations Research Institute for Social Development (UNRISD) from October 2014 to July 2015, when she became a senior associate researcher. In 2016, she was a member of the Advisory Panel for the Human Development Report 2016.

In 2019, she was appointed Executive Director of the Global Initiative for Economic, Social and Cultural Rights (GI-ESCR).

Since March 2020, she has been a member of the United Nations High-Level Panel on International Financial Accountability, Transparency and Integrity to Achieve the 2030 Agenda (FACTI).

She is a member of several boards of directors, including the Natural Resource Governance Institute (NRGI) and the Oxfam International Assembly.

She has authored various reports presented to the Human Rights Council and the United Nations General Assembly. The thematic reports focused on critical issues of rights and inclusion: the fight against inequality through fiscal policies (A/HRC/26/28, 22 May and 21 July 2014); the unpaid care work of women (A/68/293, 9 August 2013); the participation of people living in poverty in decisions that affect their lives (A/HRC/23/36, 11 March 2013); access to justice for the poor (A/67/278, 9 August 2012); the criminalisation of people living in poverty (A/66/265, 4 August 2011); the human rights-based approach to recovery from global economic and financial crises (A/HRC/17/34, 17 March 2011); and the social protection of older persons (A/HRC/14/31, 31 March 2010).

She has served as a consultant for various international organisations, including UN Women, the World Bank Group, UNHCR, UNICEF, the ILO and the Office of the United Nations High Commissioner for Human Rights (OHCHR).

=== Personal life ===
She is married and has one child.She’s based in Geneva, Switzerland.

== Distinctions ==
In 2015, she was recognised by Global Tax 50 among the individuals and organisations with the greatest tax impact in the world.

In 2024, she was recognised by the organisation International Gender Champions for her work on gender issues.

== Articles ==
- How To Strengthen Women’s Resilience to Disasters, Social Europe, March 2023.
- Taxing Super-Profits to Beat Inflation, Defend Rights, Social Europe, December 2022.
- Taxing Better to Invest in Public Services for More Caring -and Feminist- Societies, Social Europe, March 2021.
- Women and Girls Should Not Pay the Bill of the Pandemic, Common Dreams, 13 September 2020.
- Data Protection is Social Protection, Project Syndicate, 16 April 2019.
- Il n’y a pas d’égalité des sexes sans justice fiscale, Le Temps, 22 April 2019. (In French)
- Economic Inequality and Taxation are Feminist Issues, Common Dreams, 1 March 2019.
- La injusticia social tiene rostro de mujer, El Tiempo, 8 de marzo de 2018. (In Spanish)
- Tax Avoidance by Corporations Is Out of Control. The United Nations Must Step In, The Guardian, 3 September 2015. Co-author with José Antonio Ocampo.
- El imperativo de atender a las tareas de cuidado, El País, 3 March 2014. Co-author with John Hendra.
- Austerity is Devastating for the World's Poorest, The Guardian, 26 February 2013.
- The Guiding Principles on Extreme Poverty and Human Rights, Office of the United Nations High Commissioner for Human Rights, 18 July 2012.

=== Books ===
- The Rights-Based Approach to Social Protection in Latin America: From Rhetoric to Practice, Economic Commission for Latin America and the Caribbean, Social Policy Series, No. 189, Santiago, December 2014. (In Spanish)
- From Undeserving Poor to Rights Holder: A Human Rights Perspective on Social Protection Systems, Development Pathways, Working Paper No. 1, February 2014.
- Access to Justice for Persons Living in Poverty: A Human Rights Approach, Ministry for Foreign Affairs of Finland, ‘Elements for Discussion Series’, Erweko Oy, 2014. Co-author with Kate Donald.
- The Human Rights Approach to Social Protection, Ministry for Foreign Affairs of Finland, ‘Elements for Discussion Series’, Erweko Oy, 2012. Co-author with Carly Nyst.
- Human Rights Reference Handbook, University for Peace and Icelandic Human Rights Centre, Fourth revised edition, Reykjavik, 2009. Co-author with Theo van Banning, Guðrún Guðmundsdóttir, Christine Chamoun and Willem van Genugten.
- Corruption and Human Rights: Making the Connection, International Council on Human Rights Policy, Geneva, 2009.
- Human Rights and Refugee Protection. Self-Study Manual, United Nations High Commissioner for Refugees, Geneva, 2006.
- Universal and Regional Human Rights Protection: Cases and Commentaries, University for Peace, Costa Rica, 2004. Co-author with Theo van Banning, Guðrún Guðmundsdóttir and Christine Chamoun.
- The Nature of the Obligations Under the International Covenant on Economic, Social and Cultural Rights, Hart/Intersentia, Antwerp, 2003.
