= Indian National Trinamool Trade Union Congress =

Trade union in India

- Abbreviation: INTTUC
- Formation: 1 January 1998, 28 years
- Dissolved: 18 September 2026
- Headquarters: 30B, Harish Chatterjee Street, Kalighat, Kolkata-700026 , West Bengal
- National President: Moloy Ghatak

Flag of the union.

The Indian National Trinamool Trade Union Congress (INTTUC) was a trade union organisation of India politically associated with All India Trinamool Congress, with Moloy Ghatak serving as the President until 2026.
