= Ng Tompok Singh =

Ng. Tompok Singh is an Indian politician from Manipur.

He was elected to Upper House of India Parliament - the Rajya Sabha for two term 1954-1956 and 1978-1984 from Indian National Congress Party.
