= Narendra Kumar Swain =

Indian politician (1939–2020)

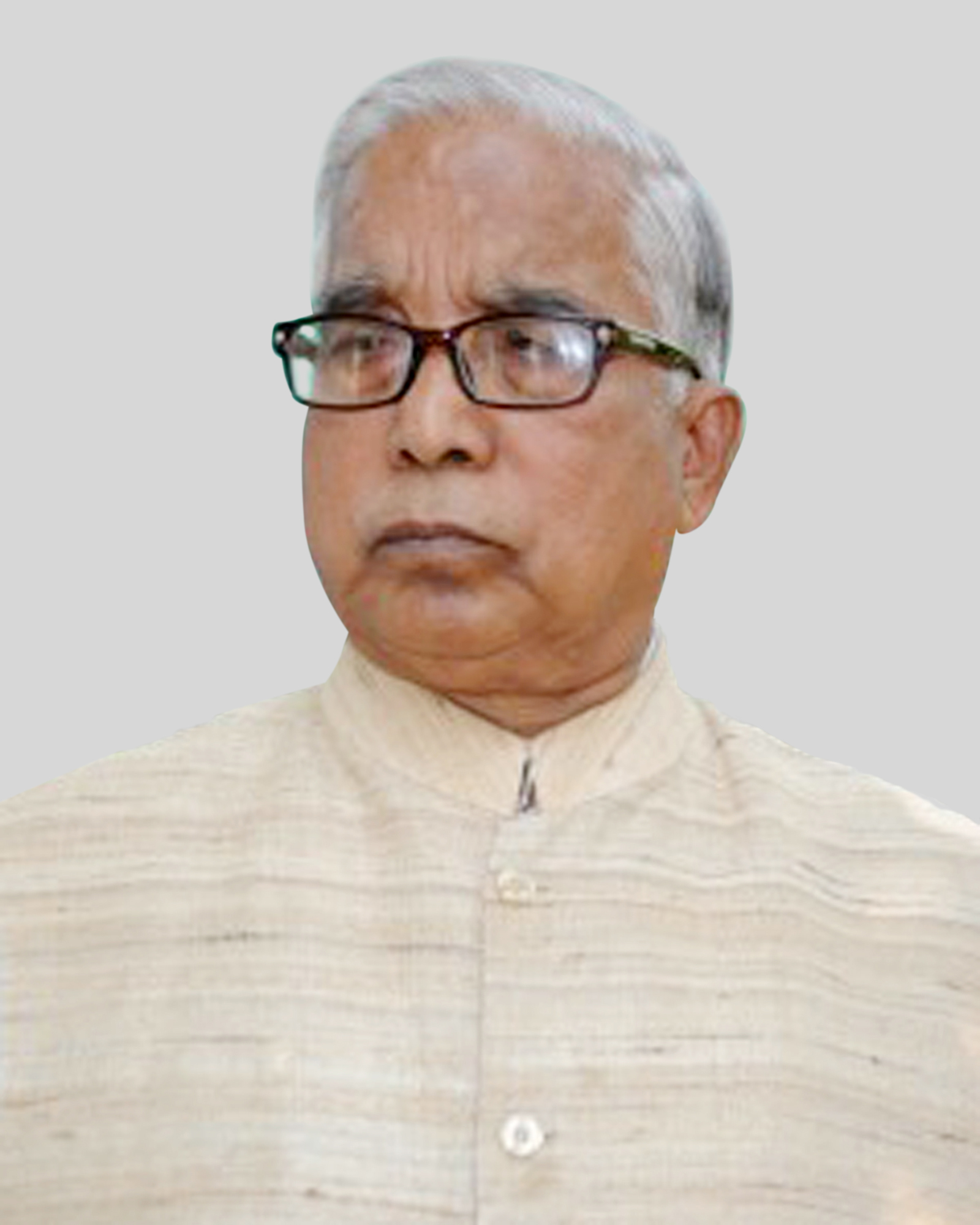

Member of the Rajya Sabha
- In office 7 December 2015 – 2 April 2020
- Preceded by: TBA
- Succeeded by: Munna Khan
- Constituency: Odisha

Personal details
- Born: 25 June 1939 Tandikana, Cuttack district, Odisha
- Died: September 7, 2020 (aged 80)
- Cause of death: heart attack
- Party: Biju Janata Dal
- Spouse: Suprava Swain
- Children: Two sons and two daughters
- Education: B.A., LL.B.
- Alma mater: Christ College, Cuttack; Madhusudan Law College, Cuttack
- Profession: Politician, Social Worker, Advocate
- Website: Rajya Sabha

Narendra Kumar Swain (June 25, 1939 – September 7, 2020) was an Indian politician from Odisha state. He was elected unopposed to the Rajya Sabha the Upper house of Indian Parliament from Odisha as a Biju Janata Dal candidate. He died September 7, 2020, after undergoing treatment at a hospital in Cuttack.

He joined the Communist Party of India in 1968 and left it in 1990. He joined Janata Dal in 1990 and was appointed General Secretary of Odisha Janata Dal in 1992. When Naveen Patnaik split Janata Dal in Odisha, he joined Biju Janata Dal in 2000 and was appointed as its General Secretary in 2001. He was Chairman of Odisha State Seeds Corporation from 2010 to 2013 and Odisha Tourism Development Corporation from 2013 to 2015.

Swain died from COVID-19 in 2020.
