= Sabir Ali (politician) =

Indian politician (born 1970)

Member of Rajya Sabha
- In office 11 April 2008 – 15 November 2011
- Constituency: Bihar

Member of Rajya Sabha
- In office 15 November 2011 – 19 April 2014
- Constituency: Bihar

Personal details
- Born: Sabir Ali; 18 July 1970 (age 55) Dumariya, East Champaran district, Bihar
- Other political affiliations: Lok Janashakti Party; Janata Dal United
- Spouse: Yasmin Sabir Ali
- Children: Five sons and two daughters
- Occupation: Industrialist, Social and political worker

Sabir Ali (born 18 July 1970) is a politician from Bihar state, India. He was member of Rajya Sabha from Bihar during 2008-2014. He was a member of the Janata Dal (United) but was expelled from the party in March 2014 for praising Narendra Modi and his "plans and policies". Subsequently, he joined BJP. He said that "had seen so called secular parties from close quarters due to his association with them and there is a difference between what they preach and what they practice", accusing them of trying to cheat Muslims in the name of secularism.

He hails from Raxaul in the East Champaran district of Bihar.
