= Jayshree Dutt Sengupta =

Indian economic journalist and author (1943–2020)

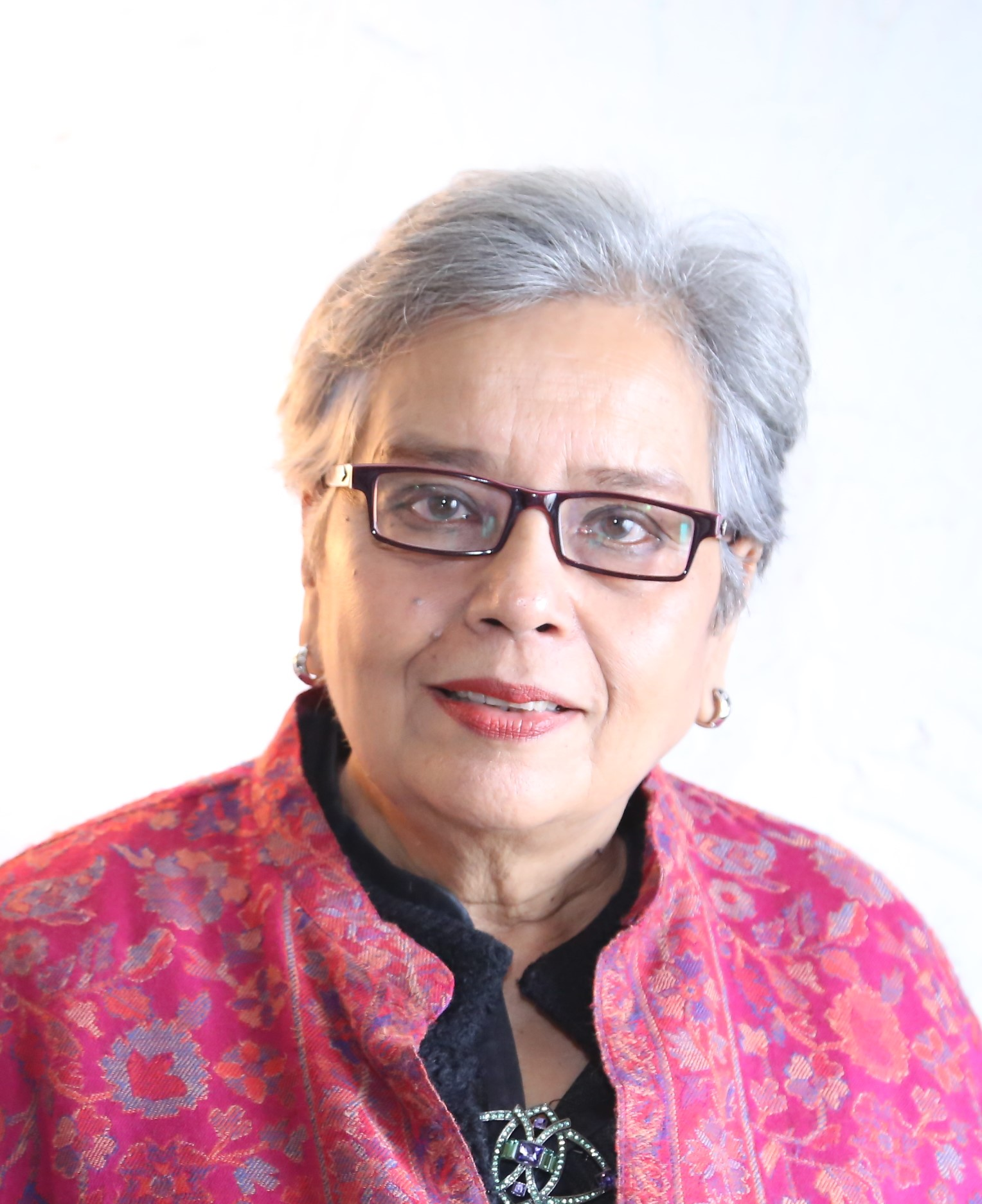
Jayshree Sengupta, 2015

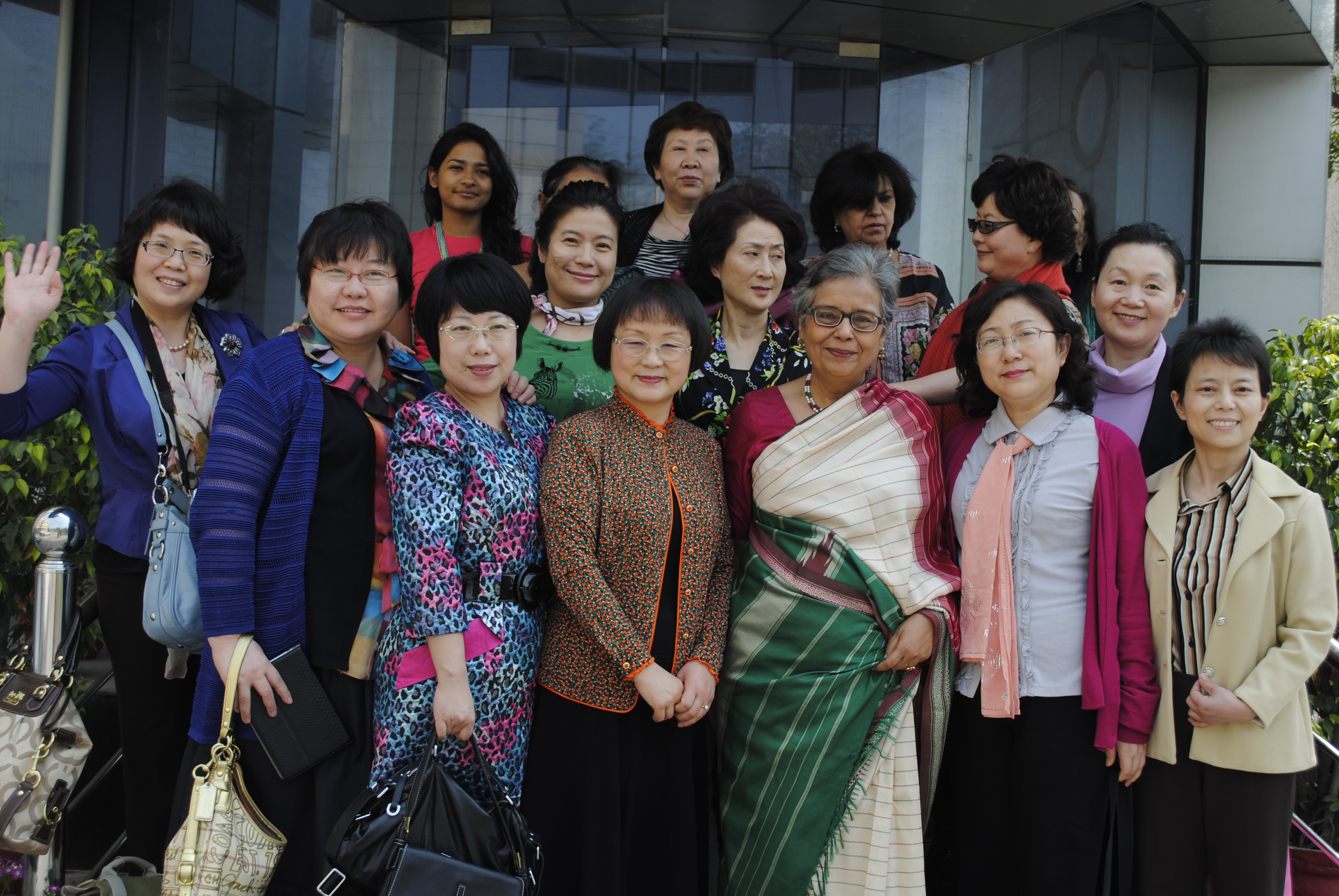
Jayshree Sengupta at the Observer Research Foundation, New Delhi, 2013

Jayshree Sengupta (October 9, 1943 — April 19, 2020) was an Indian economic journalist and author. Her work focused primarily on the Indian economy and women’s issues in development. She was especially concerned with the lack of social and economic recognition of women’s work.

Jayshree advocated a focus on development, not on growth alone. She wrote consistently on the subject of women’s economic participation and empowerment in India; she argued that national agricultural policies in India have neglected women farmers.

Her articles have appeared in English-language Indian dailies, including Times of India, Economic Times, Hindustan Times, Business Standard, and The Tribune.

Jayshree authored and edited several books, including A Nation in Transition: Understanding the Indian Economy (Academic Foundation, 2007) and (edited with Sandro Sideri) The 1992 Single European Market and the Third World. She also co-authored the 1989 World Bank report, Economic Adjustment in Algeria, Egypt, Jordan, Morocco, Pakistan, Tunisia, and Turkey.

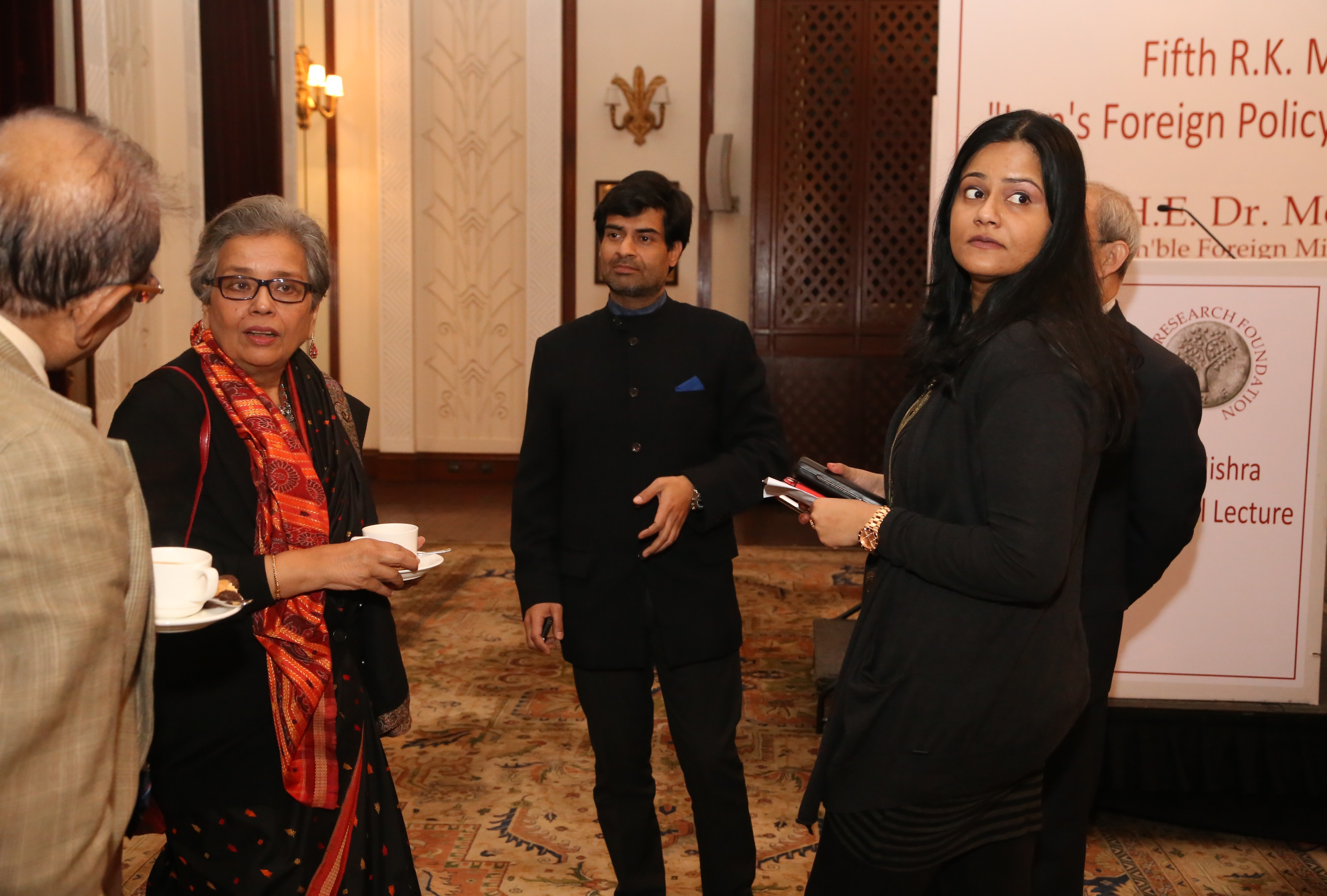
Jayshree Sengupta (left) with Samir Saran (centre), President, Observer Research Foundation, and daughter Mitu Sengupta (right), Professor, Ryerson University, Canada, at the 5th R.K. Mishra Memorial Lecture in New Delhi, 2014

Her expert opinion on the Indian economy was cited by numerous international media outlets, such as the BBC World Service, and the Financial Times.

At the time of her death, she was a Senior Fellow with the Observer Research Foundation (ORF).
