= Tutu Bose =

Indian politician (1948–2026)

- Born: Swapan Sadhan Bose; 23 January 1948; Howrah, West Bengal, India
- Died: 12 May 2026 (aged 78); Kolkata, West Bengal, India
- Other name: Tutu Bose
- Education: St. Xavier's College, Calcutta, Calcutta University
- Occupation: Businessman

Swapan Sadhan "Tutu" Bose (23 January 1948 – 12 May 2026) was an Indian politician from All India Trinamool Congress who was a Member of the Parliament of India representing West Bengal in the Rajya Sabha, the upper house of the Parliament.

Bose was also the president of Mohun Bagan AC, and a member of the Federation International Football Association (FIFA) Club Task Force.

== Early life and education ==
Swapan Sadhan Bose was born in Howrah, West Bengal on 23 January 1948. He completed his B.Com and LLB at St. Xavier's College, Calcutta, University of Calcutta.

== Business interests ==
Swapan Sadhan Bose was the owner of the cargo-handling Ripley & Co which had a turnover of ₹3 billion in 2008–09. In Dubai, where Bose spent more than half his time, he ran Radio Asia Network and the Dolphin Recording Studio. The radio network — Radio Asia (AM) in Malayalam, Suno 1024 (FM) in Hindi/Urdu and Super 947 (FM) in Malayalam and Tamil — reaches out to Indians in West Asia. The interest in media is not new, though. He diversified his business interests through the Bengali newspaper Sangbad Pratidin in August 1992. In the mid-1990s, he launched the Kolkata edition of The Asian Age, which he exited towards the end of the decade by selling a 74 per cent stake to Vijay Mallya.

== Political affiliation ==
In his early years, Bose was known to be close to the Communist Party of India (Marxist), and was said to have some business ties with late Jyoti Basu's son, Chandan Basu. It was during those times that Bose acquired a 74 per cent stake in state-owned Niramoy Polyclinic (now AMRI) along with S K Todi, also known for his Left leanings. It was given on lease to the consortium. Later, in 1996, Bose sold his stake to Emami.

Bose changed his political affiliation to the Trinamool Congress in early 2000. In 2005, he became a Member of Parliament. His son, Srinjoy Bose, took his place in the Rajya Sabha from the Trinamool Congress in 2011.

== Death ==
Bose died in Kolkata on 12 May 2026, at the age of 78.
