= W. Kulabindu Singh =

Indian politician (1926–2016)

W. Kulabidhu Singh (25 June 1926 – 17 December 2016) was an Indian politician from Manipur and is a member of the Janata Dal party.

Singh was elected to the Rajya Sabha, the Upper House of the India Parliament, for the term 1990–1996, and was the sole representative for Manipur.

Singh was married to Shrimati Tampak Devi and had 3 sons and 4 daughters. He lived in Imphal, Manipur. Singh died on 17 December 2016, at the age of 90.
