= Sangbad Pratidin =

Indian newspaper

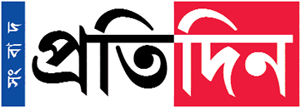

- The 8 September 2023 front page of Sangbad Pratidin
- Type: Daily newspaper
- Format: Broadsheet
- Owner(s): Swapan Sadhan Bose
- Founder(s): Swapan Sadhan Bose
- Publisher: Srinjoy Bose
- Editor-in-chief: Srinjoy Bose
- News editor: Sutirtha Chakraborty
- Founded: 9 August 1992
- Language: Bengali
- Headquarters: Kolkata, West Bengal, India
- Circulation: 266,665 Daily (as of January−July 2019)
- Website: www.sangbadpratidin.in

Sangbad Pratidin (lit. 'News everyday') is a daily Indian Bengali newspaper simultaneously published from Kolkata, Barjora and Siliguri. It was founded by Swapan Sadhan Bose, on 9 August 1992. The Editor-in-Chief is Srinjoy Bose.

== Content ==
Besides the supplements like Coffee House (published every Monday, Wednesday, Thursday and Saturday), PopKorn (published every Friday), it also has a literary magazine called Robbar on every Sunday. Amal Aloy, created by cartoonist Amal Chakrabarti, is a popular cartoon strip published in the newspaper over a decade.

== See also ==
- Bhawanipore Club
