= Pradip Bhattacharya =

Indian politician

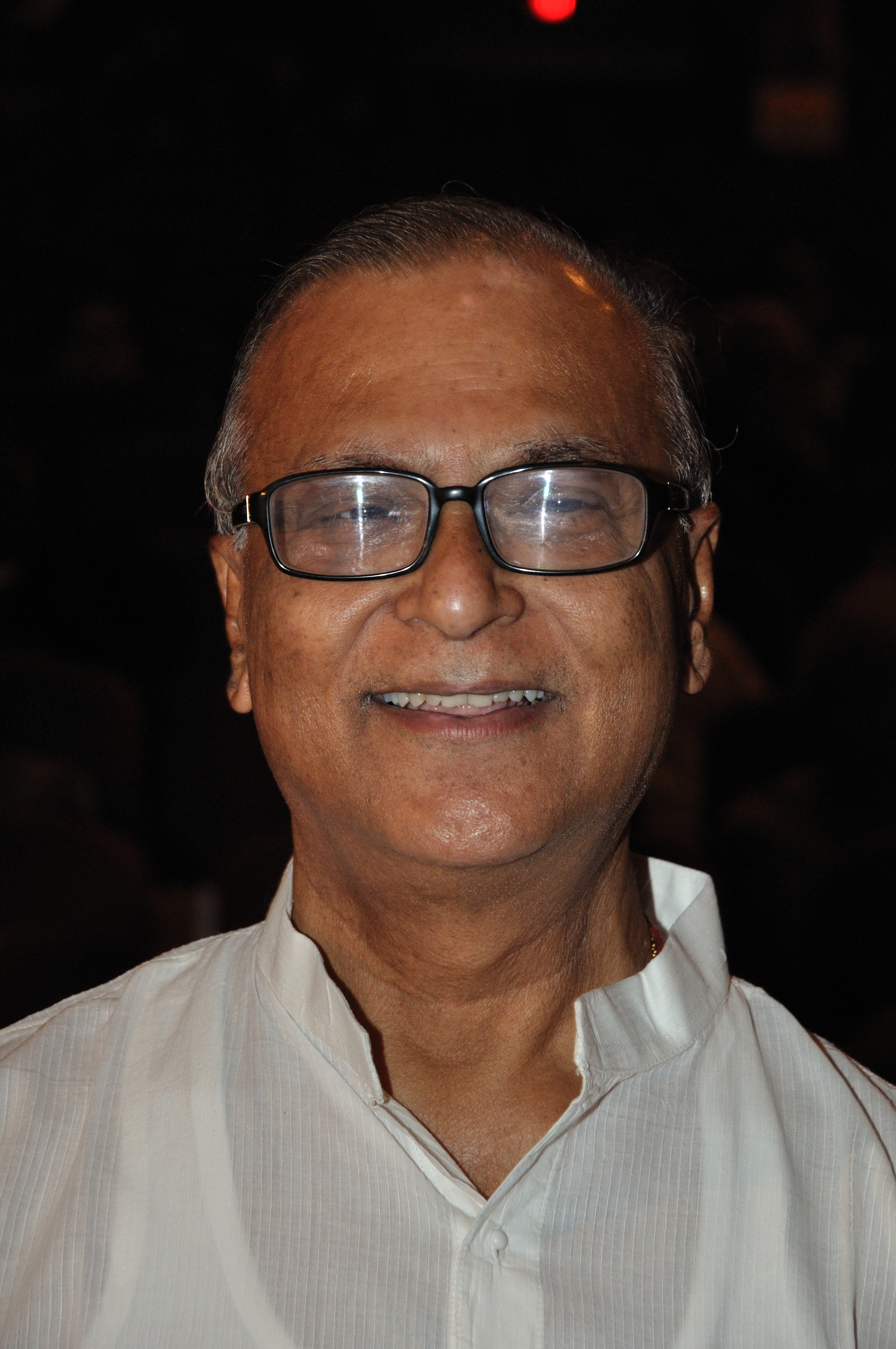

Member of Parliament, Rajya Sabha
- In office 19 August 2011 – 18 August 2023
- Succeeded by: Anant Maharaj
- Constituency: West Bengal

President of the West Bengal Pradesh Congress Committee
- In office 17 January 2011 – 10 February 2014
- Preceded by: Manas Ranjan Bhunia
- Succeeded by: Adhir Ranjan Chowdhury

Member of Parliament, Lok Sabha
- In office May 1996 – February 1998
- Preceded by: Prof. Sudarshan Roy Choudhury
- Succeeded by: Akbar Ali Khandoker
- Constituency: Serampore

Minister of State for Labour, Government of West Bengal
- In office 2 April 1972 – 21 June 1977

Member of the West Bengal Legislative Assembly
- In office 1972–1977
- Preceded by: Benoy Krishna Chowdhury
- Succeeded by: Kaustav Roy
- Constituency: Bardhaman Dakshin

Personal details
- Born: 24 January 1945 (age 81) Bardhaman, Bengal Province, British India
- Party: Indian National Congress
- Education: University of Burdwan (MA); Suri Vidyasagar College
- Profession: Politician, social worker, writer

Pradip Bhattacharya (born 24 January 1945) is an Indian politician. He was a member of the Rajya Sabha from the state of West Bengal. He is a leader of the Indian National Congress.

He had studied B.A. with honors at Suri Vidyasagar College, M.A. at Burdwan University in West Bengal. Earlier he had studied at Itagoria High School.
