= Bhabananda Singh =

Indian politician

Kshetrimayum Bhabananda Singh

MP of Rajya Sabha for Manipur
- In office 25 May 2017 – 2020
- Preceded by: Haji Abdul Salam, INC
- Succeeded by: His highness Leishemba Sanajaoba, BJP
- Constituency: Manipur

Personal details
- Born: 1 March 1960 (age 66) Gangtok, Sikkim, India
- Party: BJP

Kshetrimayum Bhabananda Singh is a politician belonging to the Bharatiya Janata Party from Manipur. On 25 May 2017, he won a bypoll to the Rajya Sabha by securing 39 votes against Congress candidate Dwijamani who secured 21 votes. He secured votes of BJP, NPP, NPF, LJP and TMC MLA (who has joined the BJP) and few Congress MLAs who have crossed over to the BJP.
