= Debabrata Bandyopadhyay =

Indian politician (born 1931)

MP of Rajya Sabha for West Bengal
- In office 19 August 2011 – 18 August 2017
- Succeeded by: Manas Bhunia
- Constituency: West Bengal

Personal details
- Party: AITC

Debabrata Bandyopadhyay (born 1931) is a Member of Parliament representing All India Trinamool Congress in the Rajya Sabha from West Bengal. He was executive director of the Asian Development Bank and had retired from the ADB from December 1991.

He had studied B.A. with Honours in Economics at Presidency College at Kolkata and completed M.A. (Economics) at University of Calcutta at Kolkata.
