= Neil O'Brien (quizmaster) =

Indian politician

Neil O'Brien (10 May 1934 – 24 June 2016) was a quiz master who was often credited for conducting the first formal well-organised quiz in Calcutta, India. He was also a chairman of CISCE. Brien served as a member of the West Bengal Legislative Assembly from 1977 to 1991 and became a nominated Anglo-Indian Lok Sabha MP in 1996. He died on 24 June 2016 at the age of 82.
