= Dilip Pandya =

Indian politician

Dilipbhai Pandya

Member of Parliament of (Rajya Sabha) for Gujarat
- In office 19 August 2011 – 18 August 2017
- Constituency: Gujarat

Personal details
- Born: January 30, 1944 (age 82)
- Party: Bharatiya Janata Party
- Profession: Politician

Dilipbhai Shivshankerbhai Pandya (born 30 January 1944 Panchgani, Satara district, MH ) is an Indian politician of the Bharatiya Janata Party. Since April 2011, he is the member of the Parliament of India representing Gujarat State in the Rajya Sabha, the upper house.
