= Abdul Salam (Indian politician) =

Indian politician

Haji Abdul Salam

Member of the Rajya Sabha for Manipur
- In office 10 April 2014 – 28 February 2017
- Preceded by: ?
- Succeeded by: Bhabananda Singh

Personal details
- Born: 1 March 1948 Heibong Makhong, Manipur, India
- Died: 28 February 2017 (aged 68)
- Party: Indian National Congress

Haji Abdul Salam (1 March 1948 – 28 February 2017) was an Indian politician. He represented the state of Manipur in the Rajya Sabha from 2014 until his death in 2017. He was a member of the Indian National Congress. Salam had previously been a member of the Manipur Legislative Assembly, representing the Wabgai Assembly constituency.

Salam died on 28 February 2017 at the age of 68.
