= Srinjoy Bose =

Indian politician (born 1976)

Member of Parliament, Rajya Sabha
- In office 2011–2015
- Constituency: West Bengal

Honorary General Secretary of Mohun Bagan A.C.
- Incumbent
- Assumed office 28 October 2018
- President: Swapan Sadhan Bose

Director of Mohun Bagan Super Giant
- Incumbent
- Assumed office 10 July 2020
- President: Sanjiv Goenka

Personal details
- Born: 17 March 1976 (age 50) Kolkata, West Bengal
- Party: Trinamool Congress
- Spouse: Nilanjana Bose
- Education: Don Bosco Park Circus
- Nickname: Tumpai

Srinjoy Bose (born 17 March 1976) is the secretary of Mohun Bagan A.C. and one of the directors of RPSG Mohun Bagan Pvt. Ltd. He was a politician representing Trinamool Congress and was elected as a member of Rajya Sabha from West Bengal in 2011.

During 2015, he quit politics by resigning his Rajya Sabha seat in the fallout from the Saradha Group financial scandal. He also resigned as the editor of Jago Bangla and quit the Trinamool Congress. He is the owner of Sangbad Pratidin, a Bengali Newspaper and an advisor to Radio Asia- the first Malayalam Radio Station in the Gulf. He has authored the book "Mahakarane Mamata" (মহাকরণে মমতা).
