= List of University of Calcutta people =

This is a list of notable people connected to the University of Calcutta.

Fourteen heads of state and government, and four Nobel laureates (Note: Rabindranath Tagore, C. V. Raman, Amartya Sen, and Abhijit Banerjee.) have been associated with the university.

== Fellows ==
- Joseph Baly, Archdeacon of Calcutta, 1872–1883
- Lal Behari Dey, Bengali Indian journalist who became a Christian missionary
- Ralph Thomas Hotchkin Griffith, British Indologist
- Thomas Holbein Hendley, British medical officer in the Indian Medical Service and Indian art connoisseur
- Nawab Abdul Latif, Bengali nineteenth-century educator
- James Wood-Mason, British zoologist, director of the Indian Museum in Calcutta

== Faculty ==
Name	Affiliation	Notability	References
Abandindranath Tagore	Vice-principal of the Government College of Art and Craft, 1905–1915	Artist, and one of the pioneers of the Bengal School of Art	
Abdur Rahim	Tagore Professor of Law		
Abdul Majed Khan	Islamic history and culture	Later taught at Victoria University of Wellington	
Amitava Raychaudhuri	Professor in Particle physics and Astroparticle physics, 1980	Winner of Shanti Swarup Bhatnagar Prize for Science and Technology	
Basanti Dulal Nagchaudhuri	Palit Professor of Physics, 1953–1959		
B. N. Mukherjee	Carmichael Professor of Ancient Indian History and Culture, 1975–1998	Historian, numismatist, epigraphist and iconographist	
Biswa Ranjan Nag		Physicist, Shanti Swarup Bhatnagar laureate	
Bhabatarak Bhattacharyya		Structural biologist, Shanti Swarup Bhatnagar Prize laureate	
C. V. Raman	Palit Professor of Physics, 1917–1932	Winner of the 1930 Nobel Prize in Physics	
Chinmoy Guha	Professor of Department of English, 2008–2023	Ordre des Arts et des Lettres winner, Ordre des Palmes académiques winner	
D. R. Bhandarkar	Carmichael Professor of Ancient Indian History and Culture, 1917–1936		
Debendra Mohan Bose	Palit Professor of Physics, 1932–1938		
Dineshchandra Sircar	Carmichael Professor of Ancient Indian History and Culture, 1962–1972	Epigraphist, historian, numismatist and folklorist	
Durga Mohan Bhattacharyya	Professor of Sanskrit at the Scottish Church College	Sanskrit scholar and Indologist	
Nalinaksha Dutt	Professor of Sanskrit and Pali and head of the Department of Pali	Sanskrit, Pali, Buddhism	
George Thibaut	Carmichael Professor of Ancient Indian History and Culture, 1912–1917	Indologist	
Harinath De		Linguist, first lecturer of the Department of Linguistics, 1907	
Hari Vasudevan	Professor of History of Europe, 1978–2017	Historian	
Hem Chandra Raychaudhuri	Carmichael Professor of Ancient Indian History and Culture, 1936–1952		
Jagadish Chandra Bose	Professor of physics at Presidency College (Note: The Presidency College (now known as Presidency University) was affiliated to the University of Calcutta between 1857 and 2010.)		
Kalidas Nag	Professor of history at the Scottish Church College	Member of Parliament	
Khudiram Das	Ramtanu Lahiri Professor of Bengali and head of the Department of Modern Indian Languages, 1973–1981		
Krishna Dhar	Taught journalism	Poet and journalist	
Malcolm Adiseshiah	Lecturer at St. Paul's Cathedral Mission College, 1930–1936		
Mahasweta Devi	Lecturer at Vijaygarh Jyotish Ray College, 1964–1977	English literature	
Meghnad Saha	Palit Professor of Physics 1938–1953		
Mukul Dey	Principal of the Government College of Art and Craft, 1928–1943	Artist	
Nrisingha Prasad Bhaduri	Professor at Gurudas College of Department of Sanskrit 1975–2010	Writer and Indologist	
Rajendra Prasad	Professor of economics at Calcutta City College	1st president of India	
Rabindranath Tagore	Ramtanu Lahiri Professor in 1932	Winner of the 1913 Nobel Prize in Literature	
Sadhan Basu	Professor of Physical chemistry, 1965-1985	Winner of Shanti Swarup Bhatnagar Prize for Science and Technology	
Subodh Sarkar	Professor at City College, Kolkata, 1984-2023	English literature	
Sarvepalli Radhakrishnan	Professor of Philosophy occupying the King George V Chair of Mental and Moral Science, 1921–1932	2nd president of India	
Satyendra Nath Bose	Lecturer of Physics, 1916–1921	Physicist known for his work in the field of quantum mechanics	
Suniti Kumar Chatterji	Khaira Professor of Indian Linguistics and Phonetics	Linguist, educationist, and Padma Bhushan recipient	
Surendranath Banerjee	Professor at Vidyasagar College 1875-1908	English literature	
Upendranath Brahmachari	Lecturer of medicine	Knighted by the British government	
Vishnu Kant Shastri	Lecturer of Hindi	Governor of Uttar Pradesh	

== Alumni ==
=== Arts ===
Name	Class year	Degree	College	Notability	References
Abanindranath Tagore			Government College of Art & Craft	Artist	
Abhishek Chatterjee			Seth Anandram Jaipuria College	Actor	
Anjan Chattopadhyay				Sitarist	
Anup Ghoshal			Asutosh College	Playback singer	
Abir Chatterjee	1998		Seth Anandram Jaipuria College	Actor	
Ananya Chatterjee			Jogamaya Devi College	Actress	
Arjun Chakrabarty	2008		St. Xavier's College, Kolkata	Actor, anchor	
Badal Sircar			Scottish Church College, Bengal Engineering College	Dramatist	
Basdeo Bissoondoyal				Pioneering educator, fighter for the right to vote in British Mauritius	
Biman Bihari Das			Government College of Art & Craft	Sculptor	
Birendra Krishna Bhadra			Scottish Church College	Playwright, actor, narrator and theatre director	
Bhaswar Chatterjee	1993		Asutosh College	Actor, writer, social activist	
Bhupen Hazarika		IA	Cotton (Note: The Cotton College (now known as Cotton University) was affiliated to the University of Calcutta between 1901 and 1948.)	Playback singer, lyricist, musician, poet and film-maker	
Bickram Ghosh			St. Xavier's College, Kolkata	Musician	
Buddhadeb Dasgupta			Scottish Church College	Film director	
Bulbul Chowdhury			Scottish Church College	Artist	
Clarence Barlow				Composer	
Debaki Bose			Vidyasagar College	Film director	
Debshankar Haldar			Scottish Church College	Theatre Actor	
Diptendu Pramanick			Scottish Church College	First Secretary of the Eastern India Motion Pictures Association; former secretary of Film Federation of India (1953–54)	
Goutam Ghose				Banga Bibhushan Award winner, film director	
Jeet Gannguli				Score composer, music director, singer	
Jeet			Bhawanipur Education Society College	Indian actor	
Jisshu Sengupta			Heramba Chandra College	Indian actor	
Kumar Sanu				Singer	
Koel Mallick	2000		Gokhale Memorial Girls' College	Actress	
Madhav Sharma			Scottish Church College	Comedian and actor based in the UK	
Manna Dey			Scottish Church College, Vidyasagar College	Singer	
Manoj Mitra			Scottish Church College	Actor, director and playwright	
Mithun Chakraborty			Scottish Church College	Actor	
Mrinal Sen	1941		Scottish Church College	Padma Bhushan winner, film director	
Nandalal Bose			Government College of Art & Craft	Artist	
P. C. Sorcar, Jr.				Magician	
Pankaj Mullick			Scottish Church College	Music director and composer	
Prabhat Roy			Maharaja Manindra Chandra College	Film director	
Pritam			Presidency	Music director	
Rabi Ghosh			Asutosh College	Actor	
Rituparna Sengupta			Lady Brabourne College	Actress	
Raima Sen	1997		Rani Birla Girls' College	Actress	
Rajatava Dutta			Netaji Nagar Day College	Actor	
Rudraprasad Sengupta			Scottish Church College	Director of Nandikar theatre group	
Rupam Islam			Asutosh College	Indian singer, songwriter, music composer, and writer	
Sachin Dev Burman			Comilla Victoria Government College	Singer	
Salil Chowdhury			Bangabasi College	Singer, music director, lyricist	
Satyajit Ray		BA	Presidency	Oscar-winning film director	
Somnath Hore			Government College of Art & Craft	Artist	
Soumitra Chatterjee		Bachelor of Arts	City College	Actor	
Sohini Sarkar				Actress	
Suchitra Mitra			Scottish Church College	Singer	
Srijit Mukherji		B.Com	Presidency	Indian filmmaker, screenwriter, lyricist, playwriter, theater artist	
Sunil Das	1959		Government College of Art & Craft	Artist	
Tarun Majumdar			Scottish Church College	Padma Shri Award winner, film director	
Tripti Mitra			Asutosh College	Padma Shri winner, Indian actress and theatre personality	
Uttam Kumar			Goenka College of Commerce and Business Administration	Actor, director, producer, composer, singer	
Utpal Dutt			St. Xavier's College, Kolkata	Actor	

=== Business ===
Name	Class year	Degree	College	Notability	References
Harsh Goenka				Chairman, RPG Group	
Jagmohan Dalmiya			Scottish Church College	Chairman of M.L.Dalmiya and Co.	
Lakshmi Niwas Mittal		BCom	St. Xavier's	Billionaire, steel tycoon, entrepreneur	
Mani Lal Bhaumik			Scottish Church College	Inventor of the Excimer Laser	
Prafulla Chandra Roy				founder of Bengal Chemicals	
Rama Prasad Goenka			Presidency	Chairman, RPG Group	
Sanjiv Goenka				Chairman, RP-Sanjiv Goenka Group	
Vinay Maloo				Chairman of Enso Group	
Dilip Shanghvi			Bhawanipur Education Society	Billionaire businessman, founder of Sun Pharmaceuticals	

=== Humanities and social sciences ===
Name	Class year	Degree	College	Notability	References
Abhijit Banerjee	1981	B.Sc. (Economics)	Presidency	Winner of the 2019 Nobel Prize in Economics	
Atri Kar	2011	BA (English Literature)		Second transgender person in India to take part in a civil services exam after a long legal battle, primary school teacher at Kuntighat.	
Atiquzzaman Khan	1943	MA (History)	Presidency	Founder-Chairman of the Department of Journalism at the University of Dhaka in 1962.	
Amartya Sen		BA (Economics)	Presidency	Winner of the 1998 Nobel Prize in Economics	
Bashabi Fraser		BA (English Literature)	Lady Brabourne College	Indian-born Scottish academic, editor, translator, and writer; professor emerita of English and Creative Writing at Edinburgh Napier University; honorary fellow at the Centre for South Asian Studies, University of Edinburgh; appointed CBE in 2021	
Benoy Kumar Sarkar	1905			Economist	
D. N. Jha		BA (History)	Presidency	Professor of history, Delhi University	
Gayatri Chakravorty Spivak	1959	BA (English)	Presidency	Philosopher, literary theorist	
Khudiram Das		MA (Bengali)		Linguist	
Nirad C. Chaudhuri			Scottish Church College	Historian and commentator on culture	
R. D. Banerji	1907; 1911	BA; MA	Presidency	Discoverer of Mohenjodaro, the principal site of the Harappa culture	
Rajat Kanta Ray		BA (History)	Presidency	Historian	
Ramaprasad Chanda			Scottish Church College	Historian, anthropologist and archaeologist	
Samita Sen		BA; MA		Historian	
Satyabrata Rai Chowdhuri				Political scientist; fellow of the University of London	
Shomie Das				Former headmaster of Mayo College and The Doon School	
Sumit Sarkar			Presidency	Professor of history, Delhi University	
Suniti Kumar Chatterjee			Scottish Church College	Linguist	
Surajit Chandra Sinha			Presidency	Anthropologist	
Susobhan Sarkar			Presidency	Professor and head of Department of History, Presidency College, Calcutta	
Tapan Raychaudhuri		BA (History); DPhil (History)	Presidency	Professor of Indian History and Civilisation, University of Oxford	

=== Law ===
Name	Class year	Degree	College	Notability	References
Abdur Rahim			Presidency	British Indian judge	
Ajit Nath Ray			Presidency	14th chief justice of India	
Altamas Kabir			Presidency	39th chief justice of India	
Amal Kumar Sarkar			Scottish Church;Bangabasi; University Law College	8th chief justice of India	
Amarendra Nath Sen			Scottish Church; University Law College	Chief justice of the Calcutta High Court	
Amin Ahmed			Presidency	Chief justice of the Dacca High Court	
Aniruddha Bose		BCom; LLB	St. Xavier's; Surendranath Law	Chief justice of Jharkhand High Court	
Ashok Kumar Mathur	1968			Chief justice of the Calcutta High Court	
Ashutosh Mukherjee	1883; 1885	BA; MA	Presidency	Judge of the Calcutta High Court	
Bhaskar Bhattacharya			Jogesh Chandra Chaudhuri	Chief justice of Gujarat High Court	
Bijan Kumar Mukherjea			Surendranath Law	4th chief justice of India	
Chittatosh Mookerjee				Chief justice of the Calcutta High Court	
Debasish Kar Gupta	1976; 1980	BCom; LLB		Chief justice of the Calcutta High Court	
Debi Prasad Pal				Judge of the Calcutta High Court	
Fazal Akbar			St. Xavier's	6th chief justice of Pakistan	
Gooroodas Banerjee			Scottish Church College	Judge of the Calcutta High Court	
Hamoodur Rahman		BA	St. Xavier's	7th chief justice of Pakistan	
Hara Chandra Ghosh				First Bengali judge of the Small Causes Court in Calcutta	
Jyotirmay Bhattacharya			St. Xavier's	Judge of the Calcutta High Court	
Kulada Charan Das Gupta			Presidency	Chief justice of the Calcutta High Court	
Manmatha Nath Mukherjee			Surendranath Law	Judge of the Calcutta High Court	
Monomohun Ghose				First practising Indian barrister of the Calcutta High Court	
Mukul Gopal Mukherjee			Scottish Church; University Law College	Chief justice of the Rajasthan High Court	
Pannalal Bose				Jurist	
Radha Binod Pal				Judge of the Calcutta High Court	
Sabyasachi Mukherjee			Presidency	20th chief justice of India	
Sarat Kumar Ghosh				Chief justice of Jaipur State	
Sudhi Ranjan Das			Scottish Church;Bangabasi	5th chief justice of India	
Umesh Chandra Banerjee	1961		Scottish Church	Judge of the Supreme Court of India	

=== Literature ===
Name	Class year	Degree	College	Notability	References
Afsar Amed				Writer	
Abul Bashar		B.com		Novelist	
Bani Basu			Scottish Church	Writer	
Bankim Chandra Chattopadhyay			Presidency	Writer, poet and journalist	
Barun Sengupta			City	Journalist	
Benjamin Walker			St. Xavier's	Writer	
Bharati Mukherjee	1958		Loreto		
Bimal Mitra				Novelist	
Bimal Kar				Novelist	
Binoy Majumdar			Presidency	Poet	
Buddhadeb Guha	1954		St. Xavier's	Popular Bengali fiction writer and poet	
Chitra Banerjee Divakaruni				Writer	
Dibyendu Palit				Writer	
Farrukh Ahmed			Scottish Church	Poet	
Kuber Nath Rai				Writer	
Leela Majumdar				Fiction writer	
Manik Bandopadhyay			Presidency College	Fiction writer	
Mahasweta Devi		I.A., M.A.	Ashutosh	Fiction writer and socio-political activist	
Michael Madhusudan Dutt			Presidency	Poet	
Muhammad Shahidullah			City College, Kolkata	Bengali linguist, philologist, and writer.	
Nabarun Bhattacharya				Writer	
Nabinchandra Sen			Scottish Church	Poet and writer	
Parvati Prasad Baruwa			Scottish Church	Litterateur	
Premendra Mitra	1925		Scottish Church	Novelist	
Purnendu Pattrea				Writer	
Rajshekhar Basu			Presidency	Writer	
Ramananda Chatterjee			City	Journalist; founder, editor, and owner of the Modern Review	
Samaresh Majumdar			Scottish Church	Writer	
Sanjeev Chattopadhyay			Scottish Church	Journalist	
Sanjib Chattopadhyay			Scottish Church	Novelist	
Sasthi Brata			Presidency	Writer	
Sharadindu Bandyopadhyay			Vidyasagar College	Writer	
Satyendranath Dutta	did not graduate		Scottish Church	Poet and writer	
Shankha Ghosh			Presidency	Eminent poet	
Shirshendu Mukhopadhyay	1953			Writer	
Subhash Mukhopadhyay	1941		Scottish Church	Writer	
Sudhindranath Dutta			Scottish Church	Author and poet	
Suchitra Bhattacharya	1968		Jogamaya Devi College	Novelist and children's fiction writer	
Sunil Gangopadhyay			Surendranath;Motijheel;City	Novelist, poet and children's fiction writer	
Syed Mustafa Siraj	1948			Writer	
Tarashankar Bandopadhyay			Asutosh	Novelist, Padma Bhushan recipient	
Utpal K. Banerjee	1955			Writer	
Upendrakishore Ray Chowdhury			Vidyasagar College	Writer	

=== Military ===
Name	Class year	Degree	College	Notability	References
Adhar Kumar Chatterji	1933		Presidency		
Subroto Mukherjee				Chief of Air Staff of the Indian Air Force	

=== Politics ===
==== Heads of state and government ====
Name	Class year	Degree	College	Notability	References
Abu Sadat Mohammad Sayem			Presidency	6th president of Bangladesh	
Abu Sayeed Chowdhury	1940; 1942		Presidency	2nd president of Bangladesh	
Abdus Sattar				8th president of Bangladesh	
Ba Maw	1924			Head of state and prime minister of the State of Burma	
Huseyn Shaheed Suhrawardy	1913	B. Sc.; MA	St. Xavier's	former prime minister of Pakistan	
Khaleda Zia			Surendranath	9th prime minister of Bangladesh	
Mohammad Mohammadullah	1948	LLB	Ripon	3rd president of Bangladesh	
Muhammad Ali of Bogra			Presidency	former prime minister of Pakistan	
Pranab Mukherjee			Suri Vidyasagar (Note: The Suri Vidyasagar College was affiliated to the University of Calcutta between 1942 and 1960.)	13th president of India	
Rajendra Prasad	1905; 1907	BA; MA	Presidency	1st president of India	
Ram Baran Yadav			Calcutta Medical College	1st president of Nepal	
Sheikh Mujibur Rahman	1944; 1947		Islamia	2nd prime minister of Bangladesh	
Tulsi Giri			Suri Vidyasagar	Prime minister of Nepal	

==== Others ====
Name	Class year	Degree	College	Notability	References
A. K. Fazlul Huq	1894; 1896; 1897	LLB	Presidency; Faculty of Law	Former Home Minister of Pakistan	
Abdullah al Mahmood	1920	BL and MA in Arabic		Former Pakistani Minister of Industries	
Ajit Kumar Panja			Scottish Church		
Arundhati Bhattacharya		BA (English Literature)	Lady Brabourne College	Chairperson and CEO of Salesforce India; first woman to be Chairperson of State Bank of India	
Abdul Latif Biswas		LLB		Federal and provincial minister of Pakistan	
Ajoy Mukherjee				Former Chief Minister, West Bengal	
Amar Kumar Bera		M.A. (Economics)		Principal CGM, Reserve Bank of India	
Amir H. Jamal		B. Com.		Former Tanzanian MP and Minister of Finance	
Anugrah Narayan Sinha				First Finance Minister of Bihar	
Ashok Mitra				Former Chief Economic Adviser to the Government of India	
Ashoke Kumar Sen				Former minister of law and justice	
Bagha Jatin			Calcutta Central College, now Khudiram Bose Central College	Freedom fighter and the principal leader of the Jugantar party	
Banwari Lal Joshi			Scottish Church	Former governor of Meghalaya	
Basudeb Acharia				Member of Parliament	
Bhawani Sankar Biswas				Provincial minister and member of the East Pakistan Provincial Assembly	
Bidhan Chandra Roy			Calcutta Medical College (Note: The Calcutta Medical College was affiliated to the University of Calcutta between 1857 and 2003.)	Former chief minister of West Bengal	
Bijoy Kumar Handique		MA	Presidency	Member of Parliament	
Biman Bose			Maulana Azad	Chairman of the Left Front in West Bengal	
Bhupendra Nath Bose				29th president of the Indian National Congress	
Brinda Karat					
Brington Buhai Lyngdoh			Scottish Church	Former chief minister of Meghalaya	
Buddhadeb Bhattacharya		BA	Presidency	Former Chief Minister of West Bengal	
Derek O'Brien			Scottish Church	Member of Parliament	
Dewan Abdul Basith				Provincial Minister of East Pakistan	
Fatima Jinnah				Opposition leader of the National Assembly of Pakistan	
George Gilbert Swell			Scottish Church	Member of Parliament	
Gopinath Bordoloi	1909; 1911; 1914	IA; BA; MA	Cotton; Scottish Church	Former chief minister of Assam	
Gyan Singh Sohanpal			Midnapore (Note: The Midnapore College was affiliated to the University of Calcutta between 1873 and 1985.)		
Harendra Coomar Mookerjee				Former governor of West Bengal	
Humayun Kabir				Former minister of education	
Jagjivan Ram	1931	BSc		Former deputy prime minister of India	
Jharna Das				Member of Parliament	
Jyoti Basu				Former chief minister of West Bengal	
K. S. Hegde			Presidency	Former speaker of the Lok Sabha	
M. J. Akbar				Member of Parliament	
Madan Mohan Malaviya		B.A.		Former president of the Indian National Congress	
Mamata Banerjee				Chief Minister of West Bengal	
Mohammad Hamid Ansari			St. Xavier's	Former vice president of India	
Mohammed Salim			Maulana Azad	Member of Parliament	
Osman Ghani Khan	1943, 1945	BA, MA (Economics)		Former C&AG of Bangladesh and chairman of the United Nations Board of Auditors	
Prafulla Chandra Sen		BSc	Scottish Church	Former chief minister of West Bengal	
Priya Ranjan Dasmunsi				Former minister of information and broadcasting	
Ritabrata Banerjee	2003	MA (English)		13th Leader of Opposition in the West Bengal Legislative Assembly	
Romesh Chunder Dutt				16th president of the Indian National Congress	
Ronen Sen			St. Xavier's	Former ambassador of India to the United States	
Sarat Chandra Bose				Indian independence activist and lawyer	
Siddhartha Shankar Ray				Former chief minister of West Bengal	
Somnath Chatterjee				Speaker of the Lok Sabha	
Subhas Chandra Bose	1918	BA (Philosophy)	Scottish Church	53rd president of the Indian National Congress; founder of the Forward Bloc	
Subrata Mukherjee					
Sultan Ahmed			Maulana Azad	Member of Parliament	
Susmita Bauri				Member of Parliament	
Surendranath Banerjee			Presidency	11th president of the Indian National Congress	
Syama Prasad Mookerjee					
T. Ali	1933	LLB		Federal and provincial minister of Pakistan	
Tarak Nath Das			Scottish Church	Revolutionary	

==== Civil servants and diplomats ====
Name	Class year	Degree	College	Notability	References
Binay Ranjan Sen			Scottish Church	Former ambassador of India to the United States	
Azizul Haque				Former Speaker of the Bengal Legislative Assembly (1937–42); Minister of Education (Government of Bengal); former vice-chancellor of Calcutta University (1938–42); High Commissioner for India to London (1942–43)	
Arundhati Ghose			Lady Brabourne College	Indian diplomat; Permanent Representative of India to the UN Offices in Geneva; head of Indian delegation to the CTBT negotiations (1996); former Ambassador to South Korea and Egypt	
Brajendranath De				ICS, Commissioner of Burdwan	
Chandeshwar Prasad Narayan Singh				India's ambassador to Nepal, Japan, governor of Punjab and Uttar Pradesh	
Gurusaday Dutt				ICS, Local Self Government and Public Health Secretary of Bengal	
Nitish Sengupta					
P.C. Bhattacharya				Controller General of Defence Accounts	
Satyendranath Tagore				Revenue Secretary of India	
Shaista Suhrawardy Ikramullah				Ambassador of Pakistan to Morocco	
Sib Chandra Deb				Deputy collector in Bengal	
Sukumar Sen				ICS, Chief Election Commissioner of India	

=== Royalty and nobility ===
Name	Class year	Degree	College	Notability	References
Nripendra Narayan			Presidency	Maharaja of Cooch Behar State	
Uday Chand Mahtab				Zamindar of Burdwan	

=== Religion ===
Name	Class year	Degree	College	Notability	References
A. B. Masilamani			Serampore	Evangelist and theologian, Canadian Baptist Mission	
A.C. Bhaktivedanta Swami Prabhupada			Scottish Church	Founder of the International Society for Krishna Consciousness (ISKCON)	
Gyanendra Nath Chakravarti		LL.B., M.A.	Muir Central College	Indian theosophist and scholar	
Durga Mohan Das				Leader of the Brahmo Samaj	
Lal Behari Dey			Scottish Church	Theologian of the Free Church of Scotland	
Mahendranath Gupta	1874	BA	Presidency	Author of Sri Sri Ramakrishna Kathamrita (The Gospel of Sri Ramakrishna)	
Paramahansa Yogananda			Scottish Church; Serampore	Hindu mystic; yogi; leading proponent of Kriya Yoga in the West	
Sitanath Tattwabhushan			Scottish Church	Theologian of Sadharan Brahmo Samaj	
Swami Gambhirananda			Scottish Church	Former president of the Ramakrishna Mission Order	
Swami Vivekananda			Scottish Church	Founder of the Ramakrishna Mission Order	

=== Science and technology ===
Name	Class year	Degree	College	Notability	References
Amar Nath Bhaduri				Enzymologist, Shanti Swarup Bhatnagar laureate	
Amitabha Bhattacharyya				Production engineer, Shanti Swarup Bhatnagar laureate	
Amitabha Mukhopadhyay				Cell biologist, Shanti Swarup Bhatnagar laureate	
Anil Kumar Gain			Surendranath	Mathematician and statistician; founder of Vidyasagar University	
Anil Kumar Mandal	1981	MBBS	Nil Ratan Sircar Medical College and Hospital (Note: The Nil Ratan Sircar Medical College and Hospital was affiliated to the University of Calcutta between 1873 and 2003.)	Ophthalmologist, Shanti Swarup Bhatnagar laureate	
Ashesh Prosad Mitra			Bangabasi	Former director of CSIR	
Benoy Krishna Tikader		Ph.D; D.Sc		Arachnologist	
Biman Bagchi	1974; 1976		Presidency	Theoretical physicist, Shanti Swarup Bhatnagar laureate	
Birendra Nath Mallick	1978; 1981	B.Sc		Neurobiologist, Shanti Swarup Bhatnagar laureate	
Biraja Sankar Guha			Scottish Church	First director of the Anthropological Survey of India	
Biswarup Mukhopadhyaya		Ph.D		Theoretical high energy physicist, Shanti Swarup Bhatnagar laureate	
C. R. Rao	1943	MA in Statistics		Statistician	
Chinmoy Sankar Dey				Molecular biologist, Shanti Swarup Bhatnagar laureate	
Deb Shankar Ray				Physical chemist, Shanti Swarup Bhatnagar laureate	
Dipak K. Das				Professor of surgery, now under investigation for fraudulent publications	
Ganesh Prasad				Mathematician	
Jagadish Chandra Bose				Physicist, botanist	
Jamal Nazrul Islam		B.Sc.	St. Xavier's College, Kolkata	Physicist, mathematician, cosmologist, astronomer	
Joyoti Basu				Cell biologist, N-Bios laureate	
Jyoti Bhusan Chatterjea				Hematologist, Shanti Swarup Bhatnagar laureate	
Kshitindramohan Naha, geologist and Shanti Swarup Bhatnagar laureate			Presidency College		
Mani Lal Bhaumik		B.Sc; M.Sc in Physics	Scottish Church College; Rajabazar Science College	Physicist	
Megh Nad Saha			Presidency College	Physicist	
Mihir Chowdhury	1955; 1957			Physical chemist, Shanti Swarup Bhatnagar laureate	
Mihir Kumar Bose	1965	B.Sc.; M.Sc.; Ph.D.		Geologist and Shanti Swarup Bhatnagar laureate	
Nirmal Kumar Dutta		MBBS	Calcutta Medical College	Pharmacologist, Shanti Swarup Bhatnagar laureate	
Nirmal Kumar Ganguly			R. G. Kar Medical College and Hospital (Note: The R. G. Kar Medical College was affiliated to the University of Calcutta between 1916 and 2003.)	Microbiologist	
Prafulla Chandra Ray			Vidyasagar College	Chemist, industrialist and philanthropist	
P. V. Manoranjan Rao				Physicist, space scientist	
Pradyut Ghosh	1990; 1992			Inorganic chemist, Shanti Swarup Bhatnagar laureate	
Prasanta Chandra Mahalanobis				Founder of the Indian Statistical Institute, Calcutta	
Radhanath Sikdar		BA in mathematics	Presidency College	Mathematician best known for calculating the height of Mount Everest	
S. C. Dutta Roy		Ph.D	Rajabazar Science College	Electrical engineer, Shanti Swarup Bhatnagar laureate	
Sadhan Basu	1942; 1944; 1948	B.Sc; M.Sc; Ph.D	Rajabazar Science College	Physical chemist, Shanti Swarup Bhatnagar laureate	
Sagar Sengupta				Cancer biologist, N-Bios laureate	
Sanghamitra Bandyopadhyay	1985-1991	PhD	Presidency College, Calcutta University	Computer scientist, first female director of Indian Statistical Institute, Padma Shri, Shanti Swarup Bhatnagar laureate in Engineering Science, 2010, TWAS Prize for Engineering Sciences, 2018, Infosys Prize 2017 in Engineering and Computer Science	
Sanjeev Das				Cancer biologist, Shanti Swarup Bhatnagar laureate	
Santasabuj Das				Immunologist, N-Bios laureate	
Satyendra Nath Bose	1913; 1915	BSc; MSc		Physicist, co-discoverer of Bose–Einstein statistics	
Saumitra Das	1992	PhD		Virologist, N-Bios laureate	
Snehasikta Swarnakar				Cancer biologist, N-Bios laureate	
Soorjo Coomar Goodeve Chuckerbutty			Calcutta Medical College		
Soumen Basak				Immunologist, N-Bios laureate	
Soumitro Banerjee	1981			Electrical engineer, Shanti Swarup Bhatnagar laureate	
Srinivasan Ramachandran				Bioinformatician, N-Bios laureate	
Subhash Chandra Lakhotia	1964–1966			Cytogeneticist, Shanti Swarup Bhatnagar laureate	
Subhash Mukhopadhyay	1955; 1958		Calcutta National Medical (Note: The Calcutta National Medical College was affiliated to the University of Calcutta between 1921 and 2003.)	First physician in India (and second in the world) to perform in vitro fertilization	
Subir Kumar Ghosh		BSc; MSc; PhD	Presidency	Geologist and Shanti Swarup Bhatnagar laureate	
Sumit Bhaduri				Organic chemist, Shanti Swarup Bhatnagar laureate	
Sumit Ranjan Das				High energy physicist, Shanti Swarup Bhatnagar laureate	
Sunil Kumar Manna				Immunologist, N-Bios laureate	
Ujjwal Maulik	1983–1989	PhD	Calcutta University	Computer scientist, worked at Stanford University, Univ. of Maryland. Los Alamos National Lab, German Cancer Research Center, Heidelberg University, IEEE fellow, Stanford List of Scientists	
Upendranath Brahmachari	1893; 1894; 1900; 1902; 1904	MD; PhD	Presidency; Calcutta Medical College		
Usha Ranjan Ghatak	1953	BSc; MSc	Asutosh	Synthetic organic chemist, Shanti Swarup Bhatnagar laureate	
Vikram Marwah	1948		Calcutta Medical College		

- Dipak K Banerjee, BSc, MSc & PhD in chemistry from the university, professor of biochemistry
- Chandramukhi Basu, one of the first two female graduates of the British Empire; first female head of an undergraduate academic institution in South Asia
- Kumudini Basu, writer, social reformer, freedom fighter and women's rights activist
- Sasanka Chandra Bhattacharyya, natural product chemist, Shanti Swarup Bhatnagar laureate
- Katyayanidas Bhattacharya, philosophy professor, Presidency College, Calcutta
- Santanu Bhattacharya, chemical biologist, Shanti Swarup Bhatnagar laureate, N-Bios laureate
- Birendra Bijoy Biswas, molecular biologist
- Nirmal Kumar Bose, Census Commissioner of India
- Debasis Chattopadhyay, plant biologist, N-Bios laureate
- Barun De, chairman, West Bengal Heritage Commission, Calcutta
- Amlan Dutta, former vice chancellor of Visva-Bharati University, Santiniketan
- Asim Duttaroy, medical scientist
- Mircea Eliade, religious scholar and philosopher
- Prafulla Chandra Ghosh, English literature scholar
- Sankar Ghosh, chairman of Department of Microbiology and Immunology at Columbia University; co-founder of Theralogics Inc.
- K. S. Krishnan, philosopher
- Dhan Gopal Mukerji, socio-cultural critic; first successful man of letters in the early 20th-century United States
- Kamini Roy, first female honours graduate in the British Empire; first feminist author in India
- Prafulla Chandra Roy, chemist
- Sir Jadunath Sarkar, vice chancellor of the University of Calcutta
- Debi Prasad Sarkar, immunologist, Shanti Swarup Bhatnagar laureate
- Brajendra Nath Seal, vice chancellor of Visva-Bharati University and the University of Mysore
- Ashoke Sen, string theorist
- Dinesh Chandra Sen, scholar of early Bengali literature
- Ranjan Sen, biophysicist, N-Bios laureate
- Sanjib Senapati, biotechnologist, N-Bios laureate

=== Sports ===
Name	Class year	Degree	College	Notability	References
Chhanda Gayen				Mountaineer, first Bengali woman to climb Mount Everest	
Chuni Goswami				Former captain of Indian football team	
Gourgopal Ghosh			Scottish Church	Football player for the Mohun Bagan Club	
Leander Paes			St. Xavier's	Former Olympic bronze medallist; Wimbledon and French Open doubles champion	
Norman Pritchard			St. Xavier's	Former Olympic silver medalist	
Pradip Kumar Banerjee			Suri Vidyasagar	Footballer	
Sailen Manna			Surendranath	Captain of the Indian football team in the London Olympics in 1948; gold medallist in 1951 Asian Games	
Saurav Ganguly			St. Xavier's	Former captain of the India cricket team	
Sunil Chhetri			Asutosh	Captain of the Indian football team	
Surya Shekhar Ganguly			Scottish Church	chess grandmaster, national chess champion	
Talimeran Ao			R. G. Kar	Former captain of the Indian football team in the 1948 Olympic Games	
Vece Paes				Former Olympic hockey player	
