= Arthur Stone (priest) =

Arthur Edward Stone was Archdeacon of Calcutta from 1898 to 1902.

Stone's father and grandfather were Church of Ireland priests. He was educated at St Peter's School, York and Trinity College, Dublin. He was ordained deacon in 1875 and priest in 1876. After a curacy at Moreton-in-Marsh he served with the Indian Ecclesiastical Establishment at Ajmere, Cawnpore, Lucknow, Delhi, Mandalay and Darjeeling. In 1898, he was appointed a Fellow of the University of Calcutta. On his return from India he was Rector of Islip from 1902 to 1910, then Vicar of Burcombe.

He died on 11 January 1927.
