= Ashutosh Mukherjee =

Bengali lawyer and mathematician (1864-1924)

Sir Ashutosh Mukherjee CSI, FRSE, FRAS, FPSL, MRIA
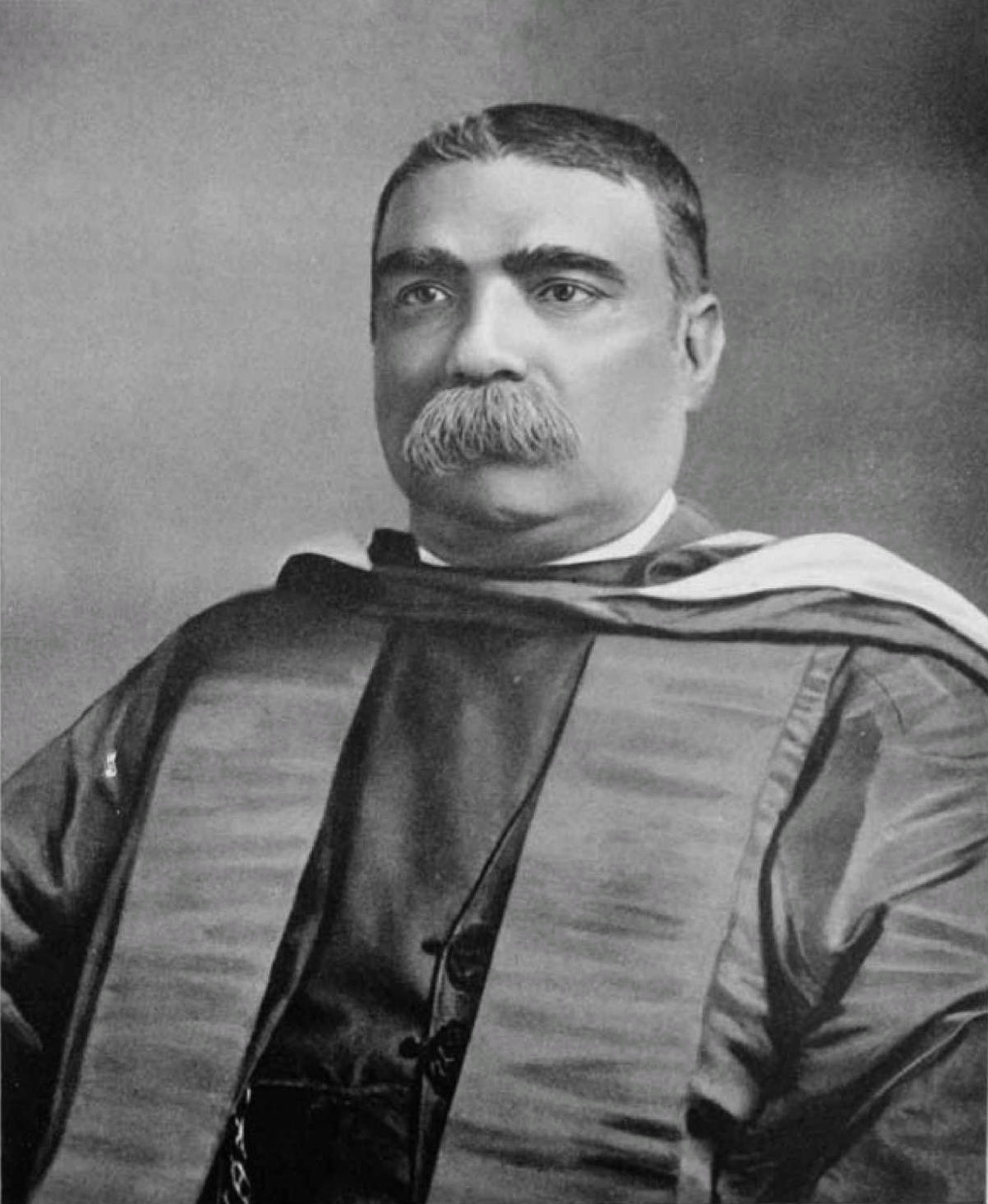
- Ashutosh Mukherjee

22nd Vice Chancellor of Calcutta University
- In office 4 April 1921 – 3 April 1923
- Preceded by: Nilratan Sircar
- Succeeded by: Bhupendranath Basu
- In office 31 March 1906 – 30 March 1914
- Preceded by: Alexander Pedler
- Succeeded by: Deva Prasad Sarbadhikari

Personal details
- Born: 29 June 1864 Calcutta, Bengal Presidency, British India (now West Bengal, India)
- Died: 25 May 1924 (aged 59) Patna, Bihar and Orissa Province, British India (now in Bihar, India)
- Resting place: Russa Road, Calcutta (Now 77 Ashutosh Mookerjee Road, Kolkata – 700025)
- Citizenship: British
- Spouse: Jogomaya Devi
- Children: 4, including Syama Prasad Mukherjee
- Relatives: Chittatosh Mookerjee (grandson)
- Education: University of Calcutta (BA, MA, MSc, LL.B, LL.D)
- Occupation: Educator and the second Indian Vice-Chancellor of the University of Calcutta Judge of the Calcutta High Court (1903–1924)
- Awards: Knight Bachelor (1911); Companion of the Order of the Star of India (CSI, 1909)
- Nickname(s): The Tiger of Bengal বাংলার বাঘ

Sir Ashutosh Mukherjee (anglicised, originally Asutosh Mukhopadhyay, also anglicised to Asutosh Mookerjee; 29 June 1864 – 25 May 1924) was an Indian mathematician, lawyer, jurist, judge, educator, and institution builder. A unique figure in Indian history, he made major contributions in the fields of mathematics, law, and higher education.

A holder of Masters degrees in both Mathematics and Natural Sciences, he was one of the first Indians to publish research papers in British journals. He became a Fellow of the Royal Society of Edinburgh at the age of 22, and was a Fellow or Member of various learned bodies in Europe and the United States (as noted below).

Next, Mukherjee passed his law examination and built a successful law practice. He became a law professor and a judge of the Calcutta High Court, and acted as the Chief Justice on couple of occasions.

"It was his ambition that Calcutta should become a centre of learning and research," noted his obituary in Nature (1924). As the Vice-Chancellor of the University of Calcutta (1906–1914 and 1921–23), Mukherjee transformed an examination conducting, degree granting body into one of Asia's top research universities. He started new departments for post graduate study in various disciplines, raised funds to create new chaired professorships and build facilities, hired outstanding professors in diverse fields of study (including Asia's first Nobel Prize winning scientist Sir C.V. Raman), and supported graduated students in their efforts to pursue advanced research.

Mukherjee was the president of the inaugural session of the Indian Science Congress (1914). He played a major role in the foundation of several major institutions and scholarly societies.

He is often called "Banglar Bagh" ('The Bengal Tiger') for his high self-esteem, courage and academic integrity. According to historian D. R. Bhandarkar, the epithet 'Vikramaditya' is also ascribed to Sir Ashutosh Mukherjee.

== Early life and family ==
Ashutosh Mukherjee was born on 29 June 1864 at Bowbazar, Calcutta (today's Kolkata) in a Hindu Brahmin family. His mother was Jagattarini Devi and father Dr. Ganga Prasad Mukhopadhyaya. His ancestral town was Jirat in Hooghly District, West Bengal. Among his ancestors were several distinguished Sanskrit scholars, including Pandit Ramchandra Tarkalankar, a professor of nyaya who had been appointed by Warren Hastings to that chair at the Sanskrit College in Kolkata.

Mukherjee's grandfather Biswanath Mukhopadhyaya. His came to Jirat from another village named Digsui, situated also in the Hooghly District and settled down there. Father Ganga Prasad Mukherjee was born in Jirat on 16 December 1836. He came to Kolkata to study in Medical College with the help of the wealthy people of Jirat like the affluent Muhuri family. Later he settled down in Bhawanipore area of Kolkata. He became a well-known doctor and founded the South Sub Urban School in Calcutta.

Ganga Prasad took particular care of his son's education. Brought up in an atmosphere of science and literature at home, young Ashutosh went to the Sisu Vidayalaya at Chakraberia, Bhowanipore and showed an early aptitude for mathematics. When he was young, he met Ishwar Chandra Vidyasagar who was a major influence on him. He was a student of Madhusudan Das.

In November 1879, at the age of fifteen, Mukherjee passed the entrance exam of the Calcutta University in which he stood second and received a first grade scholarship. In the year 1880, he took admission at the Presidency College (now Presidency University) in Kolkata where he met P.C. Ray, Mahendranath Roy and Narendranath Dutta, who would later become famous as Swami Vivekananda. In 1883, Mukherjee topped the BA examination at Calcutta University to complete a postgraduate degree in mathematics. He was awarded the prestigious Premchand Roychand Scholarship Fellowship in Mathematics and Physics, Pure and Applied.

In 1883, Surendranath Banerjee wrote an article in the newspaper Bengalee against the orders of the Calcutta High Court and he was arrested for contempt of court. Protests and hartals erupted across Bengal and other cities, led by a group of students headed by Mukherjee at the Calcutta High Court.

In 1884, he won the Harishchandra Prize for academic achievements, and completed an M.A. with first-class honours in mathematics in 1885. In 1885, he married Jogamaya Devi Bhattacharyya. In 1886, he was awarded a second Master's in Natural Sciences, making him the first student to be awarded a dual degree from Calcutta University.

Next, Sir Ashutosh Mukherjee pursued a career in law. He received a Bachelor of Law degree in 1888 and enrolled as a vakil of the Calcutta High Court. In 1897, he received a Doctor of Law (LL.D.) and became the Tagore Professor of Law at the University of Calcutta. In 1904, he was appointed a puisne judge of the High Court, and subsequently served as its acting Chief Justice for a couple of years.

== The young mathematician ==
In 1880, though only a first-year undergraduate, he published his first mathematical paper, on a new proof of the 25th proposition of Euclid's first book. His third mathematical paper (1886), "A Note on Elliptic Functions," was praised by the distinguished British mathematician Arthur Cayley as a contribution of "outstanding merit." He determined several crucial derivations of Gaspare Mainardi's answer to determining the oblique trajectory of a system of confocal ellipses. He also made lasting contributions in differential geometry, developing analytical methods of simplifying Gaspard Monge's interpretation of his general differential equation for conics.

He became a Fellow or Member of various learned bodies in Europe and the United States. He became a Fellow of the Royal Astronomical Society at the age of 21, and a Fellow of the Royal Society of Edinburgh (FRSE) when he was 22. By 1888, Mukherjee was a lecturer in mathematics for the recently established Indian Association for the Cultivation of Science (IACS).

Mukherjee continued publishing scholarly papers on mathematics and physics into his 30s. By 1893, aged 29, Mukherjee had been further elected to the fellowships of the Physical Society of France and the Mathematical Society of Palermo, and was a member of the Royal Irish Academy. He subsequently became a member of the London Mathematical Society, the Paris Mathematical Society and the American Mathematical Society (1900). Although after 1893 he largely abandoned his mathematical pursuits for a legal career, Mukherjee has been recognised as the first modern Indian mathematician to enter the field of mathematical research. He also founded the Calcutta Mathematical Society (1908) and served as its president (1908 – 1923).

== Lawyer, jurist, and justice ==
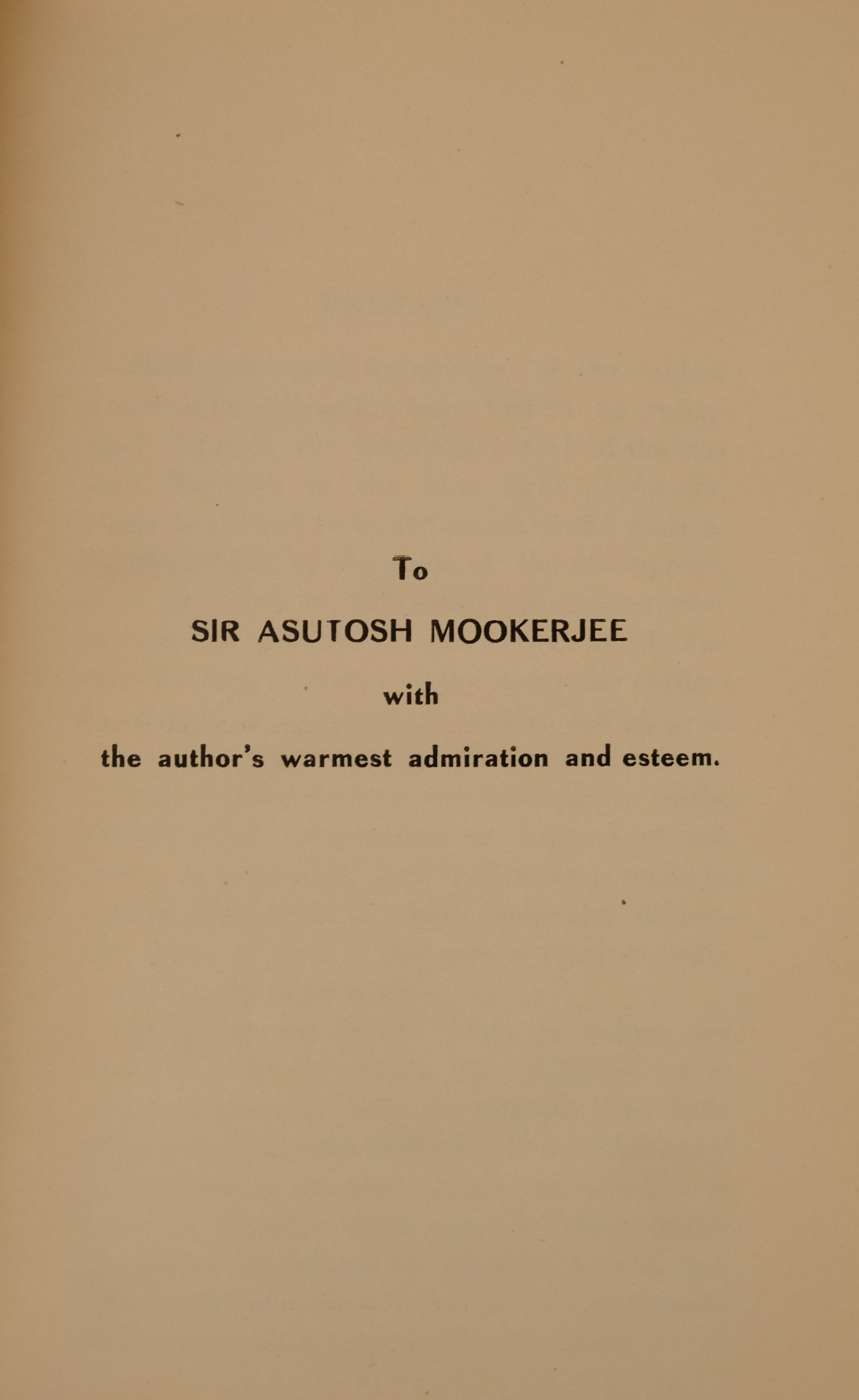
C. V. Raman's Molecular Diffraction of Light (1922) dedicated to Mukherjee

At the age of 24, Mukherjee became a Fellow of the Calcutta University. Turning down a job offer in the Department of Public Instruction in order to complete his Bachelor of Law degree, he received his degree in 1888 and enrolled as a vakil of the Calcutta High Court. He received a Doctor of Law degree (LL.D.) in 1897.

Jurist and author V. Sudhish Pai notes: "Mukherjee built a highly successful career with a combination of intellect and industry. He was appointed the Tagore Law Professor at Calcutta University in 1898 and authored the book, The Law of Perpetuities in British India, in 1902—still considered the polestar on the eastern horizon of jurisprudence. He was appointed a judge of the Calcutta High Court in June 1904. His appointment and tenure on the Bench significantly expanded judicial discourse. He brought to bear on his work inexhaustible energy, great erudition and the integrity of scholarship. His learning was vast and his exposition of law complete. Former Chief Justice Mohammad Hidayatullah placed him amongst the six most eminent judges India has produced."

When Mukherjee became a judge at the age of forty, "his senior colleague Justice Rampini told Asutosh that his enthusiasm would perhaps abate with advancing years. Asutosh had said in reply that he would not be justified in continuing as a Judge should his enthusiasm for doing justice diminish or his capacity for work decline."

Mukherjee served as Calcutta High Court's acting Chief Justice on a couple of occasions. He stepped down in 1924 after twenty years of service and restarted his law practice.

== Vice-chancellor and institution builder ==
The first modern universities in Asia were established in 1857 in Calcutta, Bombay, and Madras. However, they were modeled after the University of London and set up as affiliating universities that merely conducted examinations and granted degrees to students who were taught in affiliated colleges. Two other universities set up in 19th century British India, the universities of Punjab and Allahabad, operated in a similar way.

Viceroy of India Lord Curzon's education mission in 1902 identified the universities including the Calcutta University, as centres of sedition where young people formed networks of resistance to colonial domination. The cause of this was thought to be the unwise granting of autonomy to these universities in the nineteenth century. Thus in the period of 1905 to 1935, the colonial administration tried to reinstate government control of education. Despite these strained circumstances, Mukherjee went on to create a culture of academic excellence and built a superb research university.

He was involved in the University of Calcutta's affairs throughout his life. From the age of 25, he was a member of its Syndicate, serving on the University Senate and Syndicate for the next 16 years. He served as President of the Board of Studies in Mathematics for 11 years, and represented his university in the Bengal Legislative Council from 1899 to 1903. But the real opportunity came in 1906.

Mukherjee served as the Vice-Chancellor of the University of Calcutta from 1906 to 1914 and again from 1921 to 1923. He declared in the 1907 convocation address: "From now on the University is not just an institution issuing certificates, nor is it even a conglomeration of colleges.... This will be a centre of learning and the expansion of the frontiers of knowledge. This is precisely the true ideal of the university."

He started departments for postgraduate study in various disciplines. He set up several new academic graduate programs at the Calcutta University: comparative literature, anthropology, applied psychology, industrial chemistry, ancient Indian history and culture as well as Islamic culture. He also made arrangements for postgraduate teaching and research in Bengali, Hindi, Pali and Sanskrit. He raised funds to create new chairs and build facilities. Vice chancellors of other Indian universities followed many of his moves.

Scholars from all over India, irrespective of race, caste, and gender, came to teach and study there. He even persuaded European scholars to teach at his university. Eminent academics hired during his time included:

- Asia's first Nobel Prize winning scientist, discoverer of Raman Effect, physicist Sir C.V. Raman, FRS
- Botanists S.P. Agharkar and Paul J. Brühl
- Chemists Sir J.C. Ghosh, J.N. Mukherjee, and Sir P. C. Ray, FRSE,
- Geologists E. W. Vredenburg
- Historians R. C. Majumdar and H.C. Raychaudhuri,
- Indologist and orientalists D.R. Bhandarkar and George Thibaut,
- Jurists Radhabinod Pal and Sir Abdur Rahim
- Language and Literature scholars Nalinaksha Dutt and Dinesh Chandra Sen,
- Linguists S.K. Chatterji, Harinath De, Muhammad Shahidullah, Otto Strauss, and I.J.S Taraporewala
- Mathematicians Ganesh Prasad, Syamadas Mukhopadhyaya, N.R. Sen, and W.H. Young, FRS
- Philosophers Sir B. N. Seal and Sir S. Radhakrishnan,
- Physicists D.M. Bose, S.N. Bose, FRS, S.K. Mitra, FRS, B.B. Ray and Meghnad Saha, FRS.

He supported graduated students in their efforts to pursue advanced research. Graduates of the university at this time included Satyendra Nath Bose of the Bose–Einstein Statistics fame (after whom fundamental particles bosons are named), Meghnad Saha who developed the Saha ionization equation, and renowned radio physicist Sisir Kuma Mitra who pioneered space research in India. All three became Fellows of the Royal Society (FRS).

Mukherjee's institution building activities included establishing the University College of Science (Rajabazar Science College) and the University College of Law. He also founded Asutosh College in South Kolkata in 1916. He laid the foundry stone of Jagadbandhu Institution in 1914 and Santragachi Kedarnath Institution in 1925.

The French scholar Sylvain Lévi commented :

Had this Bengal Tiger been born in France, he would have exceeded even Georges Clemenceau, the French Tiger. Ashutosh had no peer in the whole of Europe.

== Later life and death ==
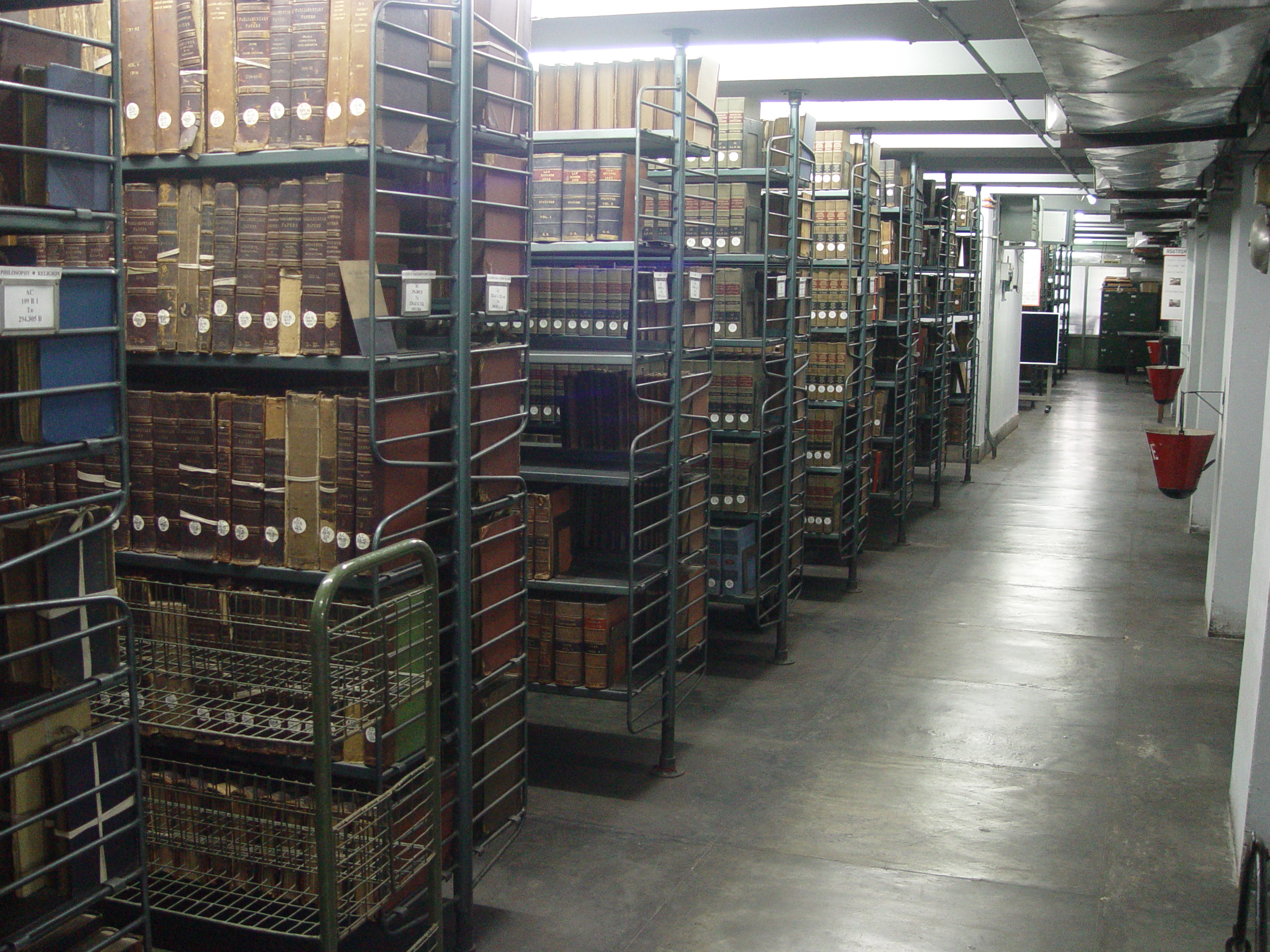
'Ashutosh Collection' at National Library of India

In 1910, he was appointed the president of the Imperial (now National) Library Council to which he donated his personal collection of 80,000 books which are arranged in a separate section. He was the president of the inaugural session of the Indian Science Congress in 1914. Mukherjee was a member of the 1917–1919 Sadler Commission, presided over by Michael Ernest Sadler, which inquired into the state of Indian education. He was thrice elected as the president of The Asiatic Society. Having served as a fellow and subsequently as a vice-president of the Indian Association for the Cultivation of Science since the 1890s, in 1922 he was elected President of the IACS and held the office until his death.

After serving five terms as vice-chancellor of Calcutta University, Mukherjee declined to be reappointed to a sixth term in 1923 when the university's chancellor, Governor of Bengal the Earl of Lytton, tried to impose conditions on his reappointment. Shortly thereafter, he also resigned his judgeship on the Calcutta High Court and resumed his private practice of law. While arguing a case in Patna the following year, Mukherjee died suddenly on 25 May 1924, at age 59. His body was returned to Kolkata and cremated at a funeral service which drew crowds of mourners.

== Personal life ==
Mukherjee married Jogamaya Devi Bhattacharyya (1871–16 July 1958) in 1885. The couple had seven children, Kamala (born 1895), Rama Prasad (1896–1983), Syama Prasad (1901–1953), Uma Prasad (1902–1997), Amala (born 1905), Bama Prasad (born 1906) and Ramala (born 1908).

His oldest son Rama Prasad became a judge in the High Court of Calcutta. Second son Syama Prasad Mookerjee was a lawyer, educationist, and a political activist; he founded the Bharatiya Jana Sangh, the direct precursor to the modern Bharatiya Janata Party. Uma Prasad became famed as a Himalayan trekker and a travel writer - being awarded the Sahitya Akademi Award for his travelogue Manimahesh.

His grandson Chittatosh Mookerjee was the Chief Justice of the Calcutta High Court and the Bombay High Court. The Mookerjee family became the first to produce three generations of justices in an Indian high court.

== Recognition and legacy ==
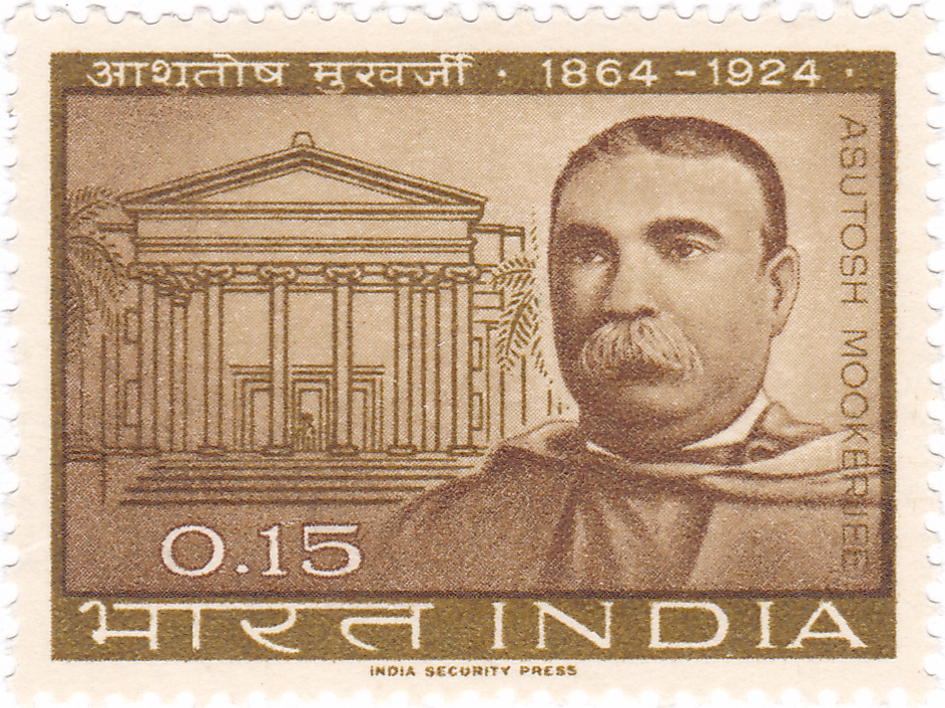
Mukherjee on a 1964 stamp of India

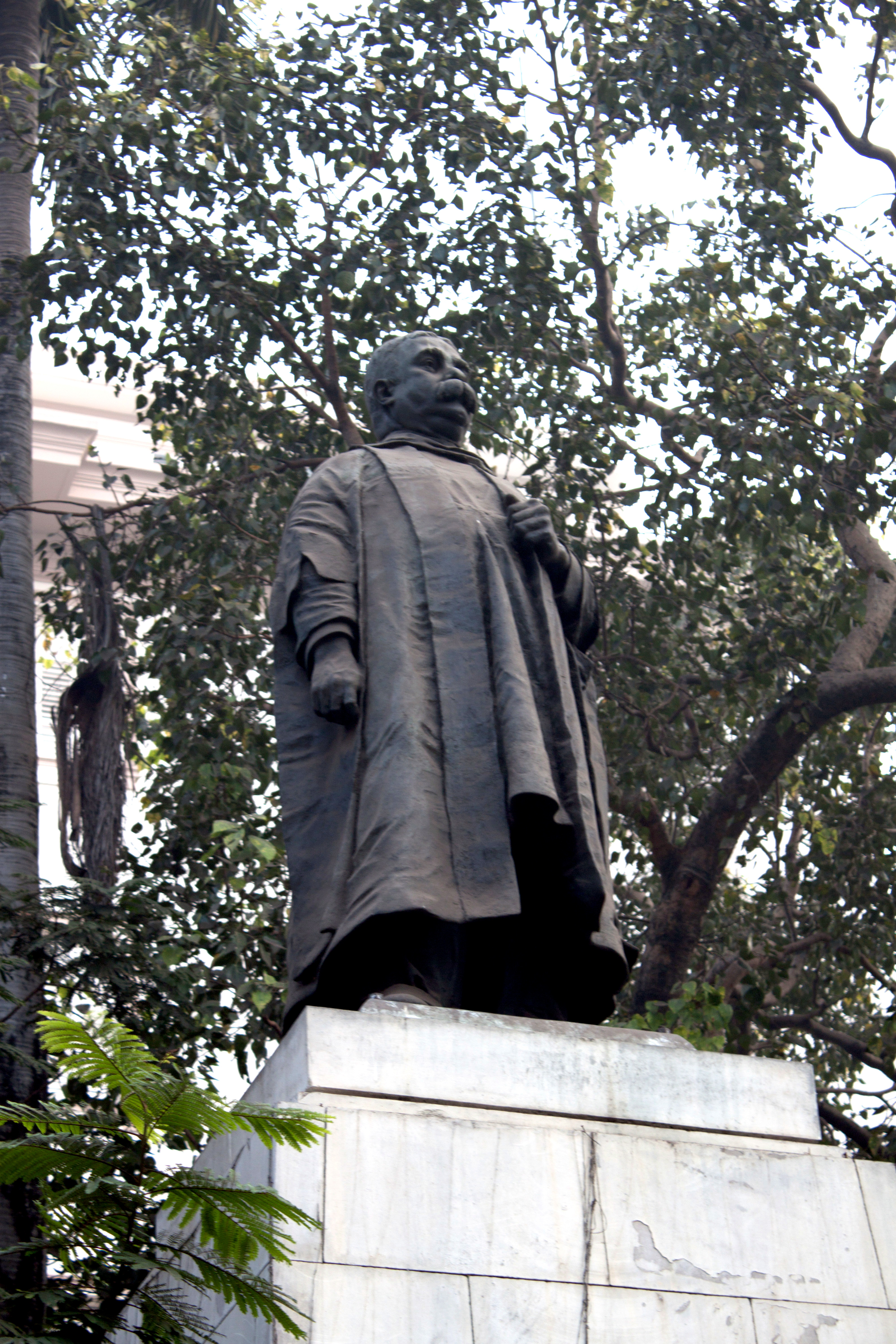
Ashutosh Mukherjee Statue at Chowringhee Square, Kolkata

Mukherjee was a polyglot learned in Pali, French and Russian. Apart from his fellowships and memberships in several international academic bodies, he was recognised by an award of the title of Saraswati in 1910 from pandits in Nabadwip, followed by that of Shastravachaspati in 1912 from the Dhaka Saraswat Samaj, Sambudhagama Chakravarty in 1914 and Bharat Martanda in 1920. Mukherjee was appointed a Companion of the Order of the Star of India (CSI) in June 1909, and knighted in December 1911.

In his lifetime, he was appointed to numerous academic societies:

- Fellow of the Royal Astronomical Society (FRAS, 1885)
- Fellow of the Royal Society of Edinburgh (FRSE, 1886; Member: 1885)
- Member of the Bedford Association for the Improvement of Geometrical Teaching (1886)
- Fellow of the Physical Society of London (FPSL, 1887)
- Fellow of the Edinburgh Mathematical Society (1888)
- Membre de la Société mathématique de France (1888)
- Member of the Circolo Matematico di Palermo (1890)
- Membre de la Société française de physique (1890)
- Member of the Royal Irish Academy (MRIA, 1893)
- Fellow of the American Mathematical Society (AMS, 1900)

The Government of India issued a stamp in 1964 to commemorate Sir Ashutosh Mukherjee for his contribution to education.

The epitaph beneath his marble bust at the Asutosh Museum of Indian Art at the University of Calcutta reads:

His noblest achievement, surest of them all/ A place for his mother tongue --- in step mother's hall.
