= Joseph Baly =

Joseph Baly (1824–1909) was Archdeacon of Calcutta from 1872 until 1883;

== Career ==
Baly was educated at Worcester College, Oxford, graduating BA in 1846 and M.A. in 1857. He was ordained deacon in 1847 and priest in 1848. He served curacies in Leicester and Falmouth. In 1854 he became Warden of St Thomas's College, Colombo. He later served as Chaplain at Allahabad, Sealkote and Simla before returning to Falmouth as its Rector (1870–1872). He was back in India as Archdeacon of Calcutta from 1872 until 1883, and was appointed a Fellow of the University of Calcutta in 1879. On his final return from India he was Chaplain of Windsor Great Park from 1885 until 1906.

He died on 6 November 1909.

== Family ==
He married Amelia Rose, who died at Trevethan, Englefield Green on 17 January 1903. His daughter Amelia Baly was the wife of Field Marshal Sir George White.

== Published Works ==
- Baly, Joseph (1897). Eur-Aryan roots: With their English derivatives and the corresponding words in the cognate languages compared and systematically arranged. Vol. 1. London: Keegan Paul, Trench, Trubner & Company.
