= Carmichael Professor of Ancient Indian History and Culture =

The Carmichael Chair of Ancient Indian History and Culture is a history professorship in the University of Calcutta, India; its holder is known as Carmichael Professor. The post was created by Ashutosh Mukherjee in 1912 after Baron Carmichael the then Governor of Bengal. The German Indologist George Thibaut was the first to be appointed a Carmichael Professor.

== List of Carmichael Professors ==
Name	Term
1912 George Thibaut	1912–1914
1917 D. R. Bhandarkar	1917–1936
1936 Hem Chandra Raychaudhuri	1936–1952
1952Jitendra Nath Banerjea	1952-1959
1962 Dineshchandra Sircar	1962–1972
1975 B. N. Mukherjee	1975–1998
