= Francis Michell =

Francis Rodon Michell (6 August 1839, in Ilfracombe, Devon – 6 August 1919, in Ash, Kent) was Archdeacon of Calcutta from 1889 to 1892.

Michell was educated at St Augustine's College, Canterbury and ordained in 1866. He served as an SPG missionary at Shanghai, Malacca and Assam before becoming Vicar of St Stephen, Calcutta in 1870. He then served at Jubbulpore before three years at St James, Calcutta. He was Acting Archdeacon of Calcutta from 1887 to 1889. He returned to England in 1895; and was at St Peter, Bedford from 1895 to 1902 and St Nicholas, Ash until his death.
