= B. N. Mukherjee =

Indian historian and writer

- Born: 1 January 1932; Bengal Presidency, British India
- Died: 4 April 2013 (aged 81); Kolkata, India
- Occupations: Historian; Writer; Numismatist; Epigraphist; Iconographist
- Children: One son
- Awards: Padma Shri; H. C. Raychaudhuri Centenary Medal

Bratindra Nath Mukherjee FRAS (1 January 1932 – 4 April 2013) was an Indian historian, numismatist, epigraphist and iconographist, known for his scholarship in central Asian languages such as Sogdian. He was a Carmichael Professor of Ancient Indian History and Culture at University of Calcutta and is reported to have deciphered many ancient scripts. He was the author of 50 books and over 700 articles on ancient history, numismatics and epigraphy. The Government of India awarded him the fourth highest civilian honour of the Padma Shri in 1992.

== Early life and education ==
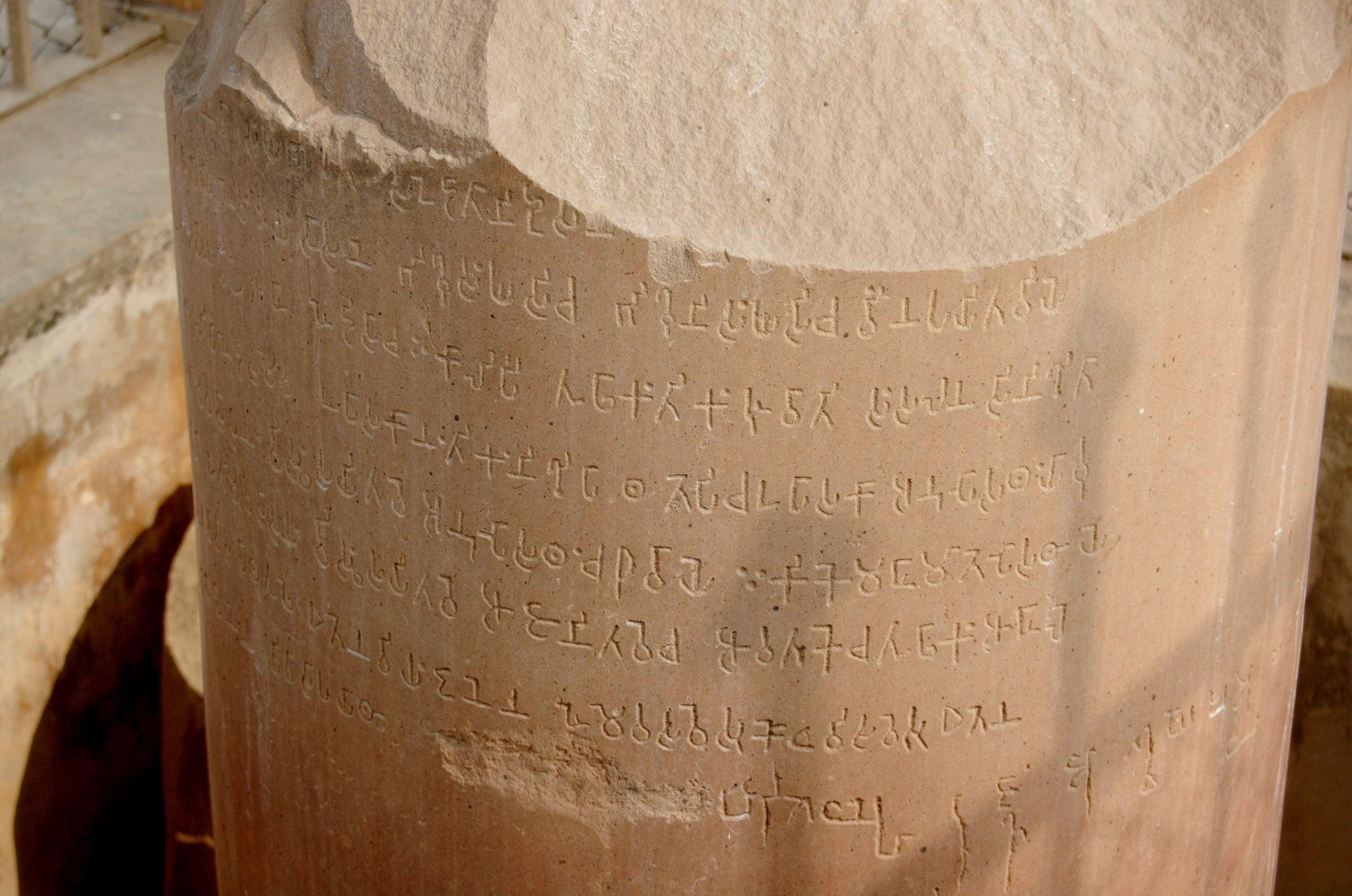
Brahmi script on Ashoka Pillar, Sarnath.

B. N. Mukherjee was born on the New Year's Day of 1932. He obtained his master's degree in Ancient Indian History and Culture from University of Calcutta, learning under Sarasi Kumar Saraswati, J. N. Banerjee and R. G. Basak and did research under the guidance of Arthur Llewellyn Basham, renowned scholar and historian, to secure a doctoral degree from the SOAS University of London, London. He continued in the United Kingdom at University of Cambridge to research under Harold Walter Bailey on historical linguistics of West and Central Asia, focusing on Iranian, Saka, Saka–Khotanese and Aramaic studies.

== Scholarship ==
Mukherjee wrote several books on the epigraphy and iconography of the central Asia, such as the Kushans and Yuezhis. His 1989 book, The Rise and Fall of the Kushanas, India in Early Central Asia (1996) and the last of his works, Kushana Studies, New Perspectives, released in 2004, account his observations on these topics. His exploration of Ancient India led him to Numismatics studies and he wrote two books on the subject, namely Numismatic Art of India and Coins of Bengal. Three of his books, The Kushana Genealogy and Chronology (1967), An Agrippan Source: Studies in Indo-Parthian History (1969) and Kushana Coins in the Land of Five Rivers (1978), employ the study of coins as a means of reconstructing the political and dynastic histories of Saka-Kushana eras. Known to be a scholar of Aramaic and Greek edicts, he elucidated the edicts of Ashoka which assisted in the study of the Maurya Empire. He asserted that these edicts were translations and transliterations of Prakrit inscriptions and revealed the political intonations of Ashoka's policy of Dhamma. His findings were published in a book, Studies in the Aramaic Edicts of Asoka (1984).

Mukherjee wrote a 300-page commentary on the treatise, Political History of Ancient India: From the Accession of Parikshit to the Extinction of the Gupta Dynasty, considered to be a classic text on ancient India, written by Hem Chandra Raychaudhuri. His studies helped in the understanding of Brahmi and Kharosthi scripts and their etymologies. His style of writing was heavily leaned on to footnotes and his findings have, at times, attracted criticisms. Besides 50 books, he also published over 700 articles in various national and international journals.

== Honours ==
Mukherjee was a professor at University of Calcutta and held the Carmichael chair of the Ancient Indian History and Culture from 1975 to 1998. He was a fellow of the Royal Asiatic Society of Great Britain and Ireland. The Government of India awarded him the civilian honour of the Padma Shri in 1992. He was the president of the Indian History Congress and was a recipient of the Hem Chandra Raychaudhuri Centenary Medal of the Asiatic Society, Kolkata.

Mukherjee died on 4 April 2013, at the age of 79, survived by his wife and son.

== Selected works ==
- B. N. Mukherjee (1981). Mathurā and Its Society: The ʼSakæ-Pahlava Phase. Firma K.L.M. ISBN 9780836415896.
- B. N. Mukherjee (1984). Studies in the Aramaic Edicts of Asoka. India Museum.
- B. N. Mukherjee (1996). India in Early Central Asia. Harman Publishing House. p. 124. ISBN 978-8185151984.
- B. N. Mukherjee (2004). Kushana Studies; New Perspectives. Firma KLM Private Limited. ISBN 978-8171021093.
- Bratindra Nath Mukherjee (2005). Origin of Brāhmī and Kharoshṭī scripts. Progressive Publishers. p. 69.
