= An Advanced History of India =

- Second edition (1950)
- Author: R. C. Majumdar; H.C. Raychaudhuri; Kalikinkar Datta
- Publisher: Macmillan & Co

An Advanced History of India is a book on Indian history written by R.C. Majumdar, H.C. Raychaudhuri, and Kalikinkar Datta, first published in 1946.

This renowned book consists of two parts. And similarly, according to the periods, the same are divided into more parts. For example, part I, ancient India, the second part of the same volume consists of the Medieval, and Mughal periods.

Two parts of the second Volume are based on modern India. Book 1 is on the Rise and Growth of British Power while Book 2 establishes details on political relations, and administrative reforms of British India until independence of India into Pakistan, and India. A separate section was later added on the separation of Bangladesh from Pakistan.

J. Coatman wrote in a review in the journal International Affairs that this book is "easily the most valuable history of India for the serious student." According to his review, the first part on Ancient India "epitomizes all that the most recent as well as older scholarship has to tell us about this fascinating period...", and the "Muslim and British parts of India's history are treated with fairness and dignity and attention is drawn to the fundamentals of history - the growth of institutions, social and economic developments, and so on. Nowhere is there any rhetoric or mere opinion."
