= Bibha Chowdhuri =

Indian cosmic ray physicist (1913–1991)

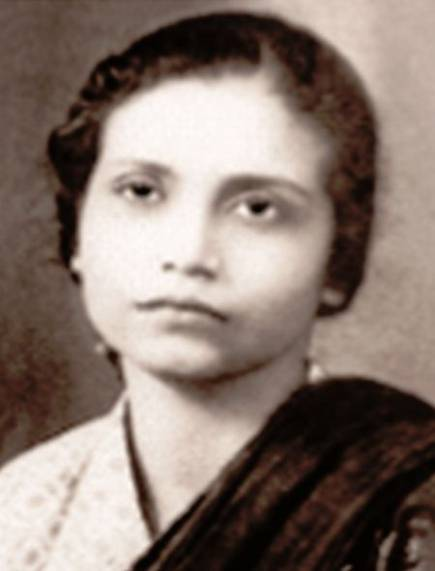
- Born: 3 July 1913; Calcutta, Bengal Presidency, British India (now Kolkata, West Bengal, India)
- Died: 2 June 1991 (aged 77); Calcutta (now Kolkata), West Bengal, India
- Education: Rajabazar Science College; University of Calcutta; University of Manchester, (PhD)
- Known for: First to discover mesons using nuclear emulsion; Identifying new particles by studying their tracks in cloud chambers and on photographic plates; KGF Experiments: Energetic muons (E_{mln} ⋍ 150 GeV) experiments at Kolar Gold Fields
- Scientific career
- Fields: Particle physics, Cosmic rays
- Workplaces: University of Calcutta; Bose Institute; University of Manchester, England; Tata Institute of Fundamental Research; Physical Research Laboratory; Saha Institute of Nuclear Physics; University of Michigan
- Thesis: Extensive air showers associated with penetrating particles (1949)
- Doctoral advisor: Sir Patrick Blackett
- Other academic advisors: Debendra Mohan Bose

Bibha Chowdhuri (3 July 1913 – 2 June 1991) was an Indian particle physicist known for her investigations into cosmic rays. Working with D. M. Bose, she was the first to discover mesons and prove Hideki Yukawa's meson theory.

== Early life ==
Chowdhuri was born in Kolkata to a family of Zamindars. Her father, Banku Behari Chowdhuri, was a doctor. Her mother, Urmila Devi, practised Brahmo Samaj, which held the belief that young women should be allowed to go to school. By marrying Urmila, Banku was converted to Brahmo and ostracised from Hindu circles. Many of the Chowdhuri children (apart from the second daughter, who died early on) went on to become highly educated. Chowdhuri was the middle child of her five siblings, with one brother. Her aunt, Nirmala Devi, was married to Sir Nilratan Sircar. Her sister, Roma Chowdhuri, went on to become a teacher at Brahmo Balika Shikshalaya.

== Education ==
Bibha studied physics at Rajabazar Science College of Calcutta University and was the only woman to complete an M.Sc. degree in the year 1936. She joined the Bose Institute after graduating in 1939 and worked with Debendra Mohan Bose. Together, they experimentally observed and published on mesotron showers, later called mesons. She studied batches of Ilford half-tone plates that were exposed to cosmic rays at two different altitudes, one in Darjeeling and a higher one at Sandakphu. The particles had decreased mass at lower altitudes, suggesting that they had decayed over time. She noticed that the decays were curved, likely due to multiple scattering of particles. They could not take the investigation further because there were no more sensitive emulsion plates available. Chowdhuri joined the laboratory of Patrick Blackett for her doctoral studies, working on cosmic rays at the University of Manchester. Her PhD thesis investigated extensive air showers. Her examiner was Lajos Jánossy. It is unclear how much of her work contributed to Blackett's Nobel Prize.

== Career and research ==
Chowdhuri demonstrated that the density of penetrating events is proportional to the total particle density of an extensive air shower. She was interviewed by The Manchester Herald in an article called "Meet India's New Woman Scientist – She has an eye for cosmic rays", saying that "it is a tragedy that we have so few women physicists today."

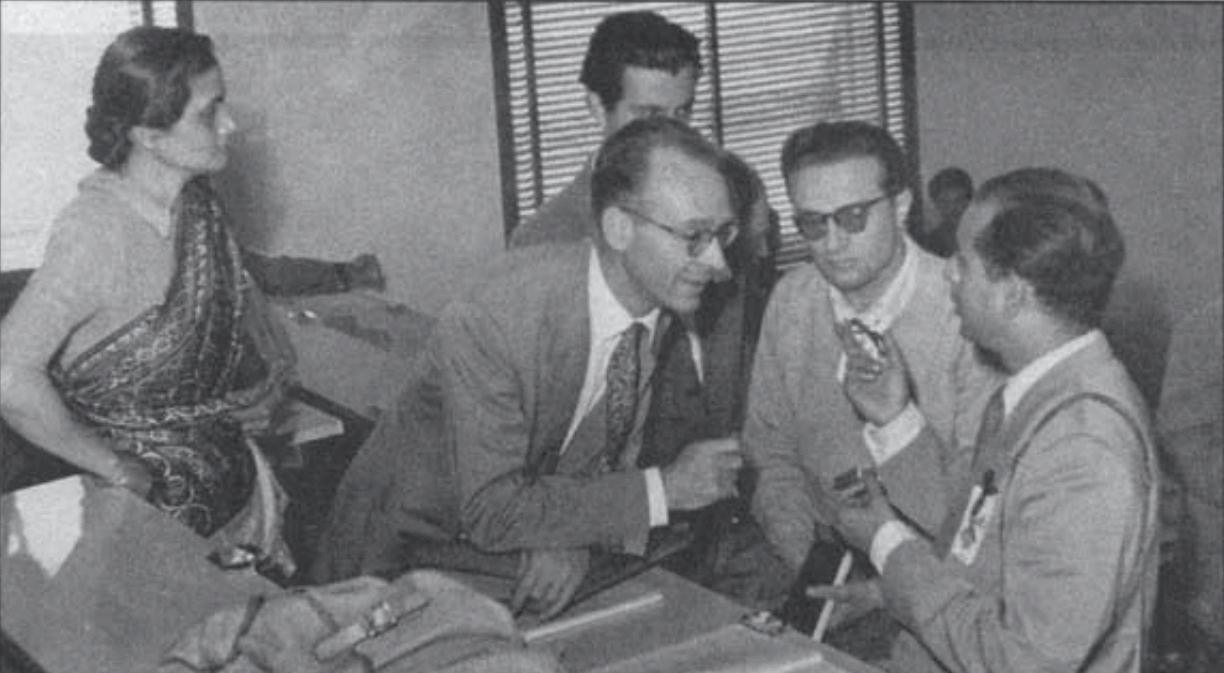
Chowdhuri at the International Conference in Pisa, Italy, in 1955

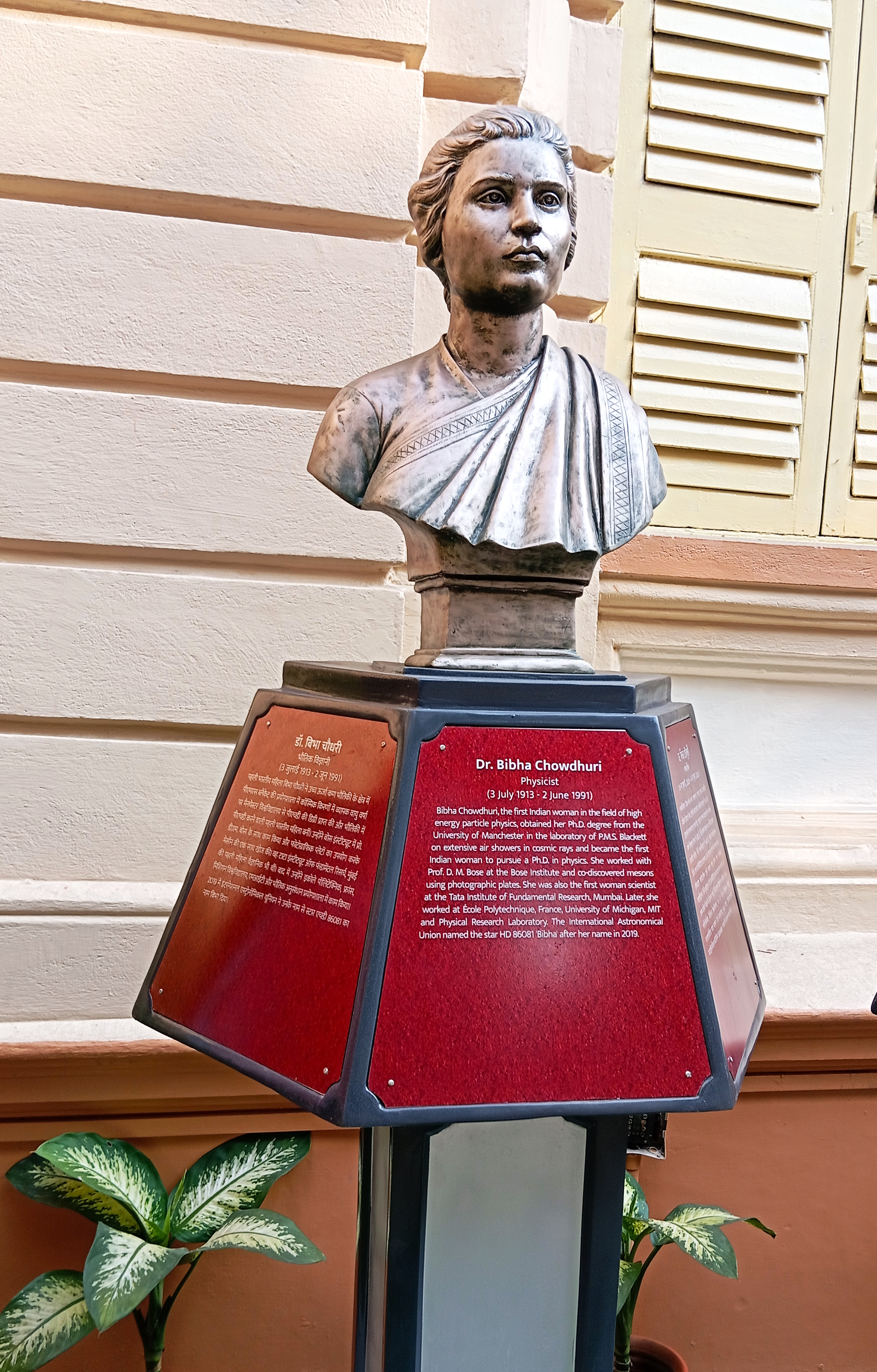
Statue of Bibha Chowdhuri, Birla Industrial & Technological Museum, Kolkata, West Bengal, India

Chowdhuri returned to India after her PhD, working at the Tata Institute of Fundamental Research for eight years. During her time at TIFR, Chowdhuri's cosmic ray studies contributed heavily to the discovery of K mesons. Bibha temporarily left TIFR in 1953 and subsequently joined cosmic ray physicist L. Leprince Ringuet’s lab under the Centre National de la Recherche Scientifique (Paris). She studied and identified many new K mesons in cloud chambers on the Alps, publishing the research in the Nuovo Cimento in 1957. In 1957, she was a visiting researcher at the University of Michigan. She was appointed because Homi Bhabha was still establishing the Tata Institute of Fundamental Research and contacted her thesis examiners for advice on outstanding graduate students. She joined the Physical Research Laboratory and became involved with the Kolar Gold Fields experiments. She moved to Kolkata to work at the Saha Institute of Nuclear Physics. She taught physics in French.

Her life was described in the book A Jewel Unearthed: Bibha Chowdhuri. und Bibha Chowdhuri, eine indische Hochenergiephysikerin, als "Star" am Himmel. She was described by The Statesman as a forgotten legend. She continued to publish until she died in 1991.

== Publications ==
- Bose, D.M.; Chowdhry, Biva (1940). Photographic Plates as Detectors of Mesotron Showers. Nature. 145: 894–895. https://doi.org/10.1038/145894a0.
- Bose, D.M.; Chowdhey, Biva (1941a). Origin and Nature of Heavy Ionisation Particles Detected on Photographic Plates Exposed to Cosmic Rays. Nature. 147: 240–241. https://doi.org/10.1038/147240a0.
- Bose, D.M.; Choudhuri, Biva (1941b). A PHOTOGRAPHIC METHOD OF ESTIMATING THE MASS OF THE MESOTRON. Nature. 148: 259–260. https://doi.org/10.1038/148259a0.
- Bose, D.M.; Choudhuri, Bibha (1942). A Photographic Method of Estimating the Mass of the Mesotron. Nature. 149: 302. https://doi.org/10.1038/149302a0.
- Chowdhuri, B (1949). Extensive air showers associated with penetrating particles. (PhD thesis). Manchester: University of Manchester. OCLC 643572452.
- Chowdhuri, B.; Saxena, R.C.; Subramanian, A. (1952). On the penetrating component in air showers. Indian Academy of Sciences. 36: 457. https://doi.org/10.1007/BF03172244.
- Chowdhuri, B.; Saxena, Y.C. (1973). Large underground showers and multiple muons in association with E.A.S, Indian Academy of Sciences. 77: 212–225. https://doi.org/10.1007/BF03050804
