= Arthur Reid (judge) =

Barrister and judge

Arthur Hay Stewart
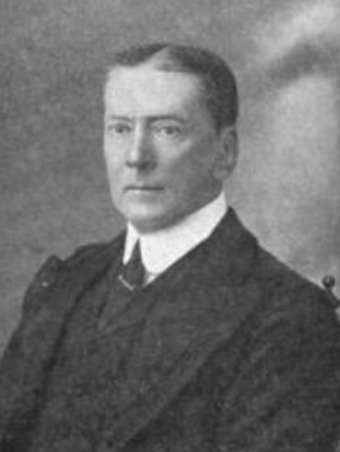
- Born: Arthur Hay Stewart Reid; 10 October 1851; Agra, British India
- Died: 7 November 1930 (aged 79); Wimborne, England
- Education: Harrow School; Trinity Hall, Cambridge
- Occupation: Jurist

Sir Arthur Hay Stewart Reid (10 October 1851 – 7 November 1930) was a barrister and judge in British India. He served as the Chief Justice of the Chief Court of the Punjab, which became the Lahore High Court.

== Biography ==
He was born in Agra, British India, the second son of Henry Stewart Reid of the Bengal Civil Service.

At a young age he was sent to England to be educated at Harrow School and later Trinity Hall, Cambridge. Thereafter he was called to the Bar at Inner Temple in 1874. Once qualified, he returned to India, and began his legal career in the North Western Provinces. Between 1883 and 1895 he served as Professor of Law at Muir Central College in Allahabad. Thereafter he combined his academic position with that of the Officiating Public Prosecutor of the High Court of North Western Provinces and as Standing Counsel to the Government.

In 1896, he moved to Lahore and became a Judge in the Chief Court of the Punjab. The following year he married Imogen, the daughter of Sir Cecil Beadon. In 1909, he was made Chief Justice of the Chief Court of the Punjab, and remained in the role until his retirement in 1914. He died at Wimborne, Dorset in November 1930.
