= Abdul Majed Khan =

Bangladeshi-New Zealander academic and researcher

Abdul Majed Khan was a Bangladeshi-New Zealander academic, researcher, and activist. He is a former senior lecturer at the Victoria University of Wellington. He taught at the University of Kolkata and University of Dhaka.

== Early life and education ==
Khan was born in August 1919. He graduated from Faridpur Zilla School and Presidency University, Kolkata, in 1935 and 1939. He did his master's degree from the University of Calcutta in 1942 in Islamic history and culture.

Khan completed his PhD at the University of London. His thesis was The Transition in Bengal 1756-1775: A Study of Saiyid Muhammad Reza Khan.

== Career ==
Khan joined the University of Calcutta as a tutor in 1943. He would be appointed a full-time lecturer and superintendent of Carmichael Hall. In 1944, he joined the Bengal Education Service as an Islamic History and Culture professor. He was posted to Islamia College, Kolkata. He transferred to the Civil Supplies Department and was stationed in Jalpaiguri.

After the partition of India, Khan moved to East Bengal. He was posted in Faridpur District, Gaibandha District, and Rajbari District. He joined the Department of Islamic History and Culture at the University of Dhaka. Khan joined the Bengali language movement in 1952.

Khan joined Victoria University of Wellington in 1966 after completing his PhD. His family was the only Bangladeshi family in New Zealand. During the Bangladesh Liberation War, he worked with M Hossain Ali and A R Mallick to lobby on behalf of Bangladesh in Australia and New Zealand.

Khan worked with Norman Kirk, Prime Minister of New Zealand, to get aid to Bangladesh such as a dairy farm in Savar and training of Bangladeshi pilots in New Zealand. He taught at the University of Dhaka as a visiting faculty in 1973. He founded the International Muslim Association of New Zealand.

== Death ==
Khan died on 31 October 1975. He was buried in Muslim Cemetery at Makara in Wellington. He had worked to establish it as the first Muslim cemetery in New Zealand and he was the first burial at the cemetery.
