= Dipak K Banerjee =

Indian biochemist and professor

Dipak K Banerjee is an Indian scholar of Biochemistry. He is a professor at the University of Puerto Rico and chairman of the company he established, DIC India Ltd.

Banerjee received his Bachelor of Science, Master of Science, and Doctor of Philosophy in Chemistry from the University of Calcutta. He has authored and co-authored articles on Glycosyltransferases and Breast cancer cells and is a fellow member of the American Association for the Advancement of Science.
