= Muir Central College =

College in northern India

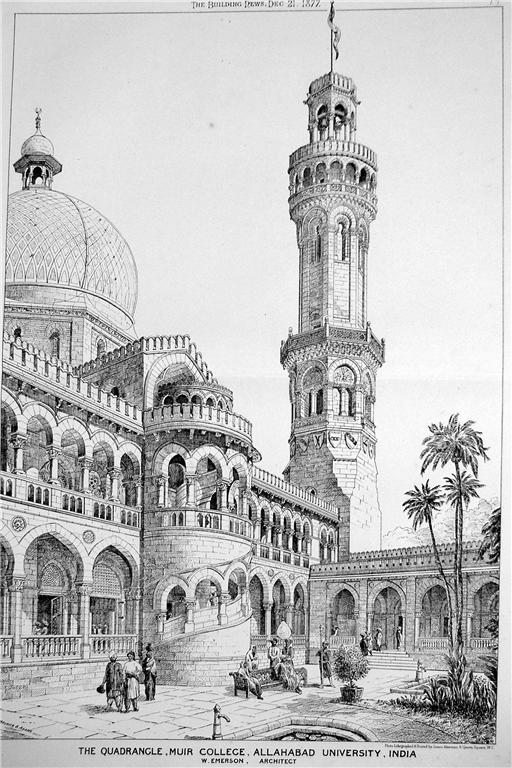
Muir Central College, c. 1877

Muir Central College in Prayagraj (formerly Allahabad) in northern India was a college of higher education founded by William Muir in 1872. It had a separate existence to 1921, when as a result of the Allahabad University Act it was merged into University of Allahabad.

The buildings (1872–1886) were a design by the British architect William Emerson. Initially the college was affiliated with the University of Calcutta.

The Muir Central College and the university were conceived to train, equip and mould the youth of the country to shoulder the responsibilities of life. Its students as the time passed by were spread all over the country and abroad filling up learned professions, the public and social services the world of trade and industry and the spheres of politics and diplomacy. Besides, it was conceived as a centre of research and academic advancement.

According to historian Avril Powell, certain debates between Saiyid Ahmed Khan, the founder of Muhammadan Anglo-Oriental College in Aligarh, and William Muir led to the founding of Muir Central College. Whereas the universities at Calcutta, Bombay, and Madras (the first in India) had classes taught in English, "Muir College opened in 1872 with three departments of equal standing, teaching respectively through the vernaculars, the 'oriental' classics and English." There was Maulawi Zaka Allah, Professor of Vernacular Science and Literature, who taught Arabic, Persian, Urdu and mathematics. One of the students' favorites was Aditya Ram Bhattacharya, professor of Sanskrit. Arthur Reid was professor of law from 1883 to 1895, and Homersham Cox came to teach mathematics in 1891.

"For its first 15 years, Muir College was able to prove itself a valuable half-way house situated rather precariously between the near monopoly of English in Calcutta University and the uniqueness of the new Punjab University’s fully fledged Oriental Department."

"By the late 1880s the Muir Central College examination results marked it as north India’s most academically successful college outside Calcutta. It would remain the nerve centre of Allahabad University until 1922, academically, socially, politically and on the games field, its 'Muir hostel', added in 1911, contributing to an espirit de corps that was to prove long-lasting."

In 1922 Allahabad University merged with Muir Central College and English became the standard medium.

Allahabad University, with Muir College at its core, was to become renowned from the late 1920s to the late 1950s as the 'Oxford of India' during a 'golden era' of teaching and research.

== Principals ==
- 1872–1885 Augustus Spiller Harrison
- 1886–1895 Archibald Edward Gough
- 1895–1906? Georg Thibaut
- James George Jennings
- 1913 Ernest George Hill (1872–1917)
- 1918–1920 William Arthur Jobson Archbold
- 1920–1922 Jeremiah Joseph Ernest Durack

== See also ==
- Ganesh Prasad
- Indo-Saracenic Revival architecture
