= Hem Chandra Raychaudhuri =

Indian historian (1892–1957)

Hemchandra Raychaudhuri
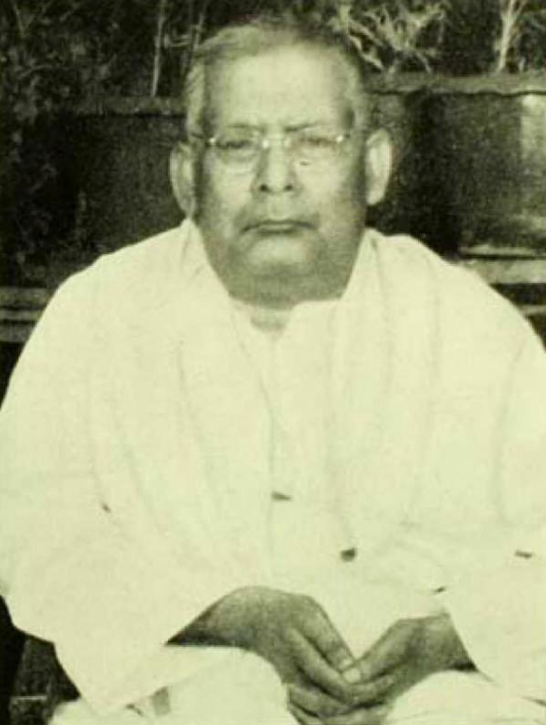
- Hemchandra Raychaudhuri
- Born: 8 April 1892; Ponabalia, Barisal District, Bengal Presidency
- Died: 4 May 1957 (aged 65); Calcutta, West Bengal, India
- Occupation: Historian

Hem Chandra Raychaudhuri (Bengali: হেম চন্দ্র রায়চৌধুরী; 8 April 1892 – 4 May 1957) was an Indian historian, known for his studies on ancient India.

== Early life and education ==
Hemchandra Raychaudhuri came from a Baidya family. He was the son of Manoranjan Raychaudhuri, the Zamindar of Ponabalia in the present-day Jhalokati District in Bangladesh, and his wife, Tarangini Devi. He completed his schooling at Brajamohan Institution in Barisal. He passed the University of Calcutta's entrance examination in 1907, standing first. He then joined Scottish Church College, Calcutta, and after that Presidency College, Calcutta, standing first in the First Class in his B.A. (Hons.) examination in 1911. For his outstanding achievements in this examination, he was awarded the Eshan Scholarship. He again stood first in the First Class in his M.A. examination in 1913 and was awarded the Griffith Prize in 1919.

His nephews were Tapan Kumar Raychaudhuri and Amal Kumar Raychaudhuri.

== Career ==
He taught as a lecturer in Bangabasi College, Calcutta (1913–14). Soon after, he joined the Bengal Education Service and was posted at Presidency College, Calcutta, from 1914 to 1916. In 1916 he was transferred to Chittagong College. Around this time, Sir Ashutosh Mookerjee offered him a lecturership at the Department of Ancient History and Culture, University of Calcutta, in 1917. He was awarded a Ph.D. in ancient Indian history from Calcutta University in 1921. In 1928 he acted as Reader in the Department of History of the University of Dacca. In 1936 he succeeded D. R. Bhandarkar as the Carmichael Professor of Ancient Indian History and Culture at Calcutta University, from where he retired in 1952.

== Works ==
- Materials for the Study of the Early History of the Vaishnava Sect, Calcutta: University of Calcutta (1920)
- Political History of Ancient India: From the Accession of Parikshit to the Extinction of the Gupta Dynasty, Calcutta: University of Calcutta (1923)
- Studies in Indian Antiquities, Calcutta: University of Calcutta (1932)
- Vikramaditya in History and Legend, Vikrama-volume, Scindia Oriental Institute (1948)
- An Advanced History of India (Madras, 1946; last reprint in 1981) (authored with R.C. Majumdar and Kalikinkar Datta)
