= Basanti Dulal Nagchaudhuri =

Indian physicist and academic

B. D. Nag Chaudhuri
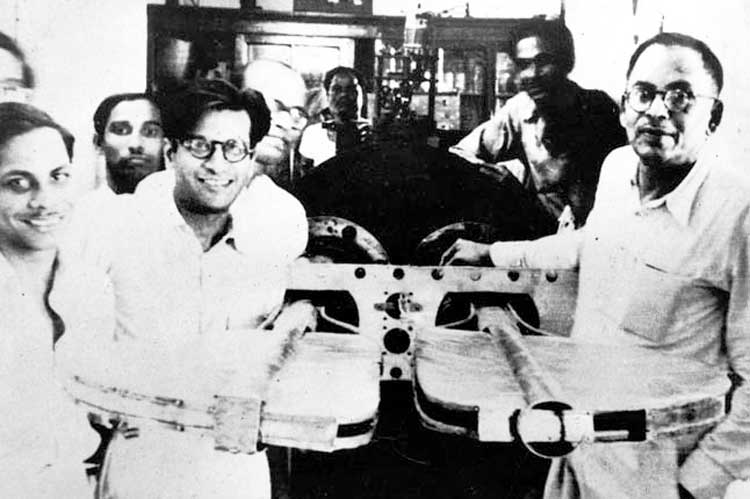
- B. D. Nag Chaudhuri (second from left, front row) with Meghnad Saha and others.

3rd Director General of Defence research and development organisation
- In office 1970–1974
- Preceded by: Suri Bhagavantam
- Succeeded by: MGK Menon

Personal details
- Born: 6 September 1917 Narayanganj, Dhaka, Bengal, British India
- Died: 25 June 2006 (aged 88) Calcutta, West Bengal, India
- Education: Banaras Hindu University; Allahabad University; University of California, Berkeley
- Known for: Building India's first cyclotron One of the pioneers of nuclear physics in India
- Awards: Padma Vibhushan
- Scientific career
- Organization(s): Indian National Science Academy; International Foundation for Science, Sweden; ITC Sangeet Research Academy
- Fields: Physics
- Workplaces: Rajabazar Science College; University of Calcutta; Saha Institute of Nuclear Physics; Government of India; Planning Commission; Jawaharlal Nehru University

Basanti Dulal Nag Chaudhuri (6 September 1917 – 25 June 2006) was an Indian Nuclear scientist and academic, and Scientific Advisor to the Ministry of Defence, Government of India. He is known as one of the pioneers of nuclear physics in India. While serving as the Director General (chairman) to the Defence Research and Development Organisation (DRDO), he played influential role in Pokhran-I (Smiling Buddha), India's first successful Nuclear bomb test on 18 May 1974. This historic achievement made India the sixth nation in the world to become a nuclear superpower, after the United States of America, Soviet Union (now Russia), England, France, and China. He also initiated the first feasibility studies on India's ballistic missile program.

In the early 1970s, as the Scientific Advisor to the Ministry of Defence and chair of the Cabinet Committee on Science and Technology, Basanti Dulal Nagchaudhuri played an influential role in Smiling Buddha, India's first nuclear test. He also initiated the first feasibility studies on India's ballistic missile program. Later, he also served as a member of the Planning Commission and as Vice Chancellor of the Jawaharlal Nehru University.

== Early life ==
Basanti Dulal Nag Chaudhuri hailed from a Bengali Hindu family of Narayanganj, Dhaka, Bengal Presidency, British India (present-day Bangladesh). During the partition of India in 1947 and the ensuing communal violence in East Bengal (now Bangladesh) of Pakistan, his family moved to West Bengal, India.

His father became a professor of English at the Banaras Hindu University, now Indian Institute of Technology (Banaras Hindu University) Varanasi (IIT-BHU).

He graduated with a Bachelor of Science degree from the Banaras Hindu University. He obtained a Master's degree from Allahabad University. In Allahabad, he met influential lawyer Parmeshwar Narayan Haksar as well as renowned Indian physicist, Meghnad Saha. He became close to Saha and joined his research group. In July 1938, when Saha moved to the Rajabazar Science College campus of University of Calcutta, Nagchaudhuri moved with him.

Through Saha, he came in contact with Ernest Lawrence and with the latter's support he moved to the University of California, Berkeley at the end of 1938 to work on his doctorate in Nuclear Physics. His thesis advisor was Ernest Lawrence. Nagchaudhuri completed his doctorate in 1941 and returned to India.

After the partition of India in 1947 and the ensuing violence against Hindus in Dhaka, his family moved to India. His father took a position as a professor in the Department of English at the Banaras Hindu University.

Nagchaudhuri was married to Dipali Nag née Talukdar, daughter of a professor at St. John's College, Agra. Dipali Nag was a well-known classical vocalist. They had one son.

== Professional work ==
=== Academics and research ===
After completing his doctorate in 1941, Nagchaudhuri returned to the Rajabazar Science College, University of Calcutta to join Saha's research group. In 1949, when the Saha Institute of Nuclear Physics (SINP) was established, Nagchaudhuri was affiliated with research at the institute, while continuing to teach at Science College, Calcutta University. After Saha's retirement in 1952, he was named Director of the SINP.

Nagchaudhuri's research focused on nuclear isomers, induced radioactivity, Cherenkov radiation and nonthermal plasma. During his doctorate at Berkeley, he had worked with the pioneers of the cyclotron. Before returning to India in 1941, with support from Saha and funding from the Tatas, Nagchaudhuri had arranged for shipment of parts for a cyclotron magnet to the Calcutta University. However, ship carrying the second consignment of parts for the cyclotron was sunk by the Japanese. The team under the leadership of Saha and later under Nagchaudhuri took on the task of building the remaining parts themselves. Problems with the vacuum pumps continued to afflict the project. The demountable oscillators also proved difficult to build. It was only in 1954, after a visit from Emilio Segre to the laboratory, that the cyclotron started to function. Nagchaudhuri is thus credited with building the first cyclotron in India.

In 1953, he succeeded Meghnad Saha as the Palit Professor of Physics at Calcutta University, a post which he held until 1959. He was a visiting professor at University of Illinois at Urbana-Champaign in 1961-62 and nominated as a Lincoln Lecturer.

=== Government ===
Being well-connected to the political elite of West Bengal through his relationship with B.C. Roy and with P.N. Haksar, Nagchaudhuri was nominated to serve as the Chairman of the Cabinet Committee of Science & Technology from 1969 to 1972. During this period, he also served as the Scientific Advisor to the Ministry of Defence (MoD). He became a Member of the Planning Commission in 1970. From 1970 to 1974, he served as the Scientific Advisor to the DRDO.

Given his background in nuclear physics, and in his roles as the chair of the cabinet committee and as scientific advisor to the DRDO, he was closely involved in the policy discussion about India's nuclear test. In October 1972, then Prime Minister Indira Gandhi gave the go-ahead for the Smiling Buddha test. Nagchaudhuri was a member of the steering committee for the test preparations. It was in the scientific laboratories of the DRDO, headed by Nagchaudhuri, that the explosive lenses for the test were fabricated. The test was successfully conducted in May 1974.

In 1970, he was also tasked by Indira Gandhi to prepare a classified feasibility study for building long-range ballistic missiles. Based on Nagchaudhuri's recommendation, Project Valiant was initiated in 1972 to build a liquid-fuelled intermediate range ballistic missile. Another initiative, Project Devil, was initiated at the Defense Research & Development Laboratory (DRDL) to produce short-range surface-to-air missiles. While both projects were terminated in 1974 due to conflicts within DRDL and resulting lack of progress, they laid the foundation for the successful Integrated Guided Missile Development Program in the early 1980s.

In 1970-71, Nagchaudhuri also chaired a committee that examined India's maritime security issues. The committee made several key recommendations about the requirement to patrol India's vast coastline, set up a registry of offshore fishing vessels in order to identify illegal activity, and establish a capable and well-equipped force to intercept vessels engaged in illegal activities. The recommendations of the committee formed the foundation of the subsequent Rustamji Committee in 1974, that led to the establishment of the Indian Coast Guard.

=== Later work ===
From 1 July 1974 to 1 January 1979, he served as the Vice Chancellor of the Jawaharlal Nehru University (JNU). From 1975 to 1977, he served as the Chairman of the National Committee on Environmental Planning and Coordination.

He also served on the Board of Governors of the Indian Institute of Technology, Delhi.

== Affiliations ==
Nagchaudhuri served on numerous Indian and international scientific councils. From 1976 to 1984, he served a Member of the Scientific Council of the International Centre for Theoretical Physics. From 1980 to 1982, he also served on the Research Advisory Council of the National Physical Laboratory. He also served as a member and vice-chair of the Board of Governors of the East-West Center.

He also served on the boards of various Indian public sector companies. These included Bharat Dynamics Limited, Bharat Electronics Limited and Hindustan Aeronautics Limited.

Nag Chaudhuri maintained an active interest in Hindustani Classical Music and Bengali literature and culture.

=== Awards ===
Nagchaudhuri was elected a Fellow of the Indian National Science Academy in 1964. He was awarded the Padma Vibhushan in 1975. He also received honorary doctorates from Andhra University and the Kanpur University.

== Death ==
Nagchaudhuri died of a cerebral infarction on 25 June 2006. He was survived by his wife, Dipali Nag, his son and his family.
