= Suri Vidyasagar College =

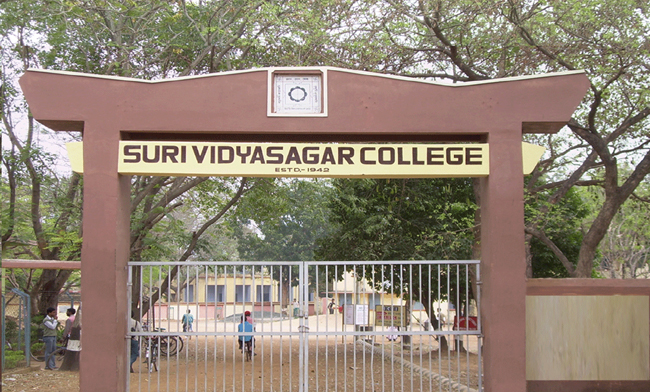
- Type: Undergraduate college Public college
- Established: 1942; 84 years ago
- Affiliations: University of Burdwan
- Principal: Dr. Tapan Kumar Paricchha
- Location: College para, Suri, West Bengal, 731101, India; 23.8979776°N 87.5328689°E
- Campus: Urban
- Website: Suri Vidyasagar College

- Location within West Bengal Location within India

Suri Vidyasagar College, established in 1942, is a government affiliated college located at Suri in the Birbhum district of West Bengal. It is affiliated to the University of Burdwan and teaches arts, science and commerce.

== History ==
The first attempt to establish the college in Suri was made in 1934 but failed because of the lack of funding. Fresh vigour was again observed in 1940 and one committee was formed. That committee members submitted a proposal to the then Bengal 'Prime Minister' and Education Minister-in-Charge, Fajlul Haque, to establish a college in Suri.

By then the world war II had started and Japanese forces started bombing in Calcutta. People started panicking and started fleeing Calcutta for the neighbouring townships and villages. During that time, the colleges of Calcutta had to be closed because of the fear of bombing. At that time, Vidyasagar College, Kolkata, planned to shift their college elsewhere. First, they tried to set up their college at a school in Sainthia but were disapproved by the SDO of Suri. Later, the college administration approached Dr. Kaligati Banerjee of Suri, and he grabbed the opportunity with both hands. A meeting was called at the house of Dr. Kaligati Banerjee in 1942 and a proposal was placed before the Governing body of Calcutta Vidyasagar College for the establishment of a college.

Governing body of the Vidyasagar College, Calcutta, approved the proposal with an initial funding of Rs. 5000. Finally, Suri Vidyasagar College was established under the guidance of Principal J.K. Chowdhury and with the newly appointed Vice-Principal (Suri campus) Tribhangamurari Mondal.

At the time of the establishment of the college, this college was under the University of Calcutta. Later, when University of Burdwan was established, the affiliation of this college was shifted to the University of Burdwan.

== Departments and Courses ==
The college offers different undergraduate and postgraduate courses and aims at imparting education to the undergraduates of lower- and middle-class people of Suri and its adjoining areas.

=== Science ===
Science faculty consists of the departments of Chemistry, Physics, Mathematics, Statistics, Computer Science, Botany, Zoology, Physiology, Microbiology, Plant Protection, Electronics and Economics.

=== Arts & Commerce ===
Arts & Commerce faculty consists of departments of Bengali, English, Sanskrit, Arabic, History, Geography, Political Science, Philosophy, Mass Communication & Journalism, and Commerce.

== Notable alumni ==
- Pranab Mukherjee, former President of India, former Finance Minister of India
- Tulsi Giri, former Prime Minister of Nepal

== Notable faculty ==
- Manoj Mitra

== Accreditation ==
The college is recognized by the University Grants Commission (UGC). It was accredited by the National Assessment and Accreditation Council (NAAC), and in 2016 awarded B++ grade, an accreditation that has since then expired.

== See also ==
- List of institutions of higher education in West Bengal
- Education in India
- Education in West Bengal
