= Krishna Dhar =

Indian poet and playwright (1928–2022)

Krishna Dhar (1 February 1928 – 12 October 2022) was an Indian poet, playwright, writer, journalist, columnist and teacher. He wrote poetry alongside verse drama, nonfictional prose of varied nature and journalistic columns from the mid-1940s.

== Early life and education ==
The Dhar family originated in Kamalpur village of Kishorganj, now in the Dhaka Division, earlier Mohkuma (মহকুমা) under the Mymensingh District, in Bangladesh. Krishna Dhar was the second of the seven children born to the late Chinmoyee Dhar and the late Upendra Chandra Dhar. His father was a legal practitioner in the court at Bajitpur, a nearby town. His forefathers adopted and developed a reasonably uninhibited, unorthodox lifestyle of nineteenth century Bengal which, in turn, formed the basis of their family tradition. Krishna Dhar spent his formative years as a child at Kamalpur where he took his primary education at a village school or pathsala. For his high school education, he shifted to his father's work place at Bajitpur. After his matriculation in 1943 from Bajitpur H. E. School, Kishorganj and Intermediate at Feni College, Brahmanbaria (1943–1945), Dhar went on to study at Scottish Church College, Kolkata (1945–1947) and subsequently got his master's degree in Bengali literature from Calcutta University in 1949.

== Career ==
Dhar started his professional career by teaching undergraduate students at Deshbandhu Girls' College, Kolkata while simultaneously writing features for Bengali newspapers. In 1950-51 he quit his teaching position to join Jugantar, a Bengali daily in 1952 as sub editor, and subsequently became the assistant editor of the daily. He continued in Jugantar for the next 35 years and retired from the daily as editor. In 1990, he joined Dainik Basumati, another Bengali daily, as editor until his retirement in 1992. In this period Dhar also had numerous teaching assignments, focusing primarily on journalism, at Surendranath College, Burdwan University, and Calcultta University.

== Literary career ==
Dhar published his first book of poem, Angikar, in 1948. Spanning over a period of seventy five years, his socially sensitive, humanist and aesthetic poems, verse dramas, and prolific prose continue to appeal and enthrall his readers.

== Personal life and death ==
Dhar married to Kalpana (née Nag) in 1950. She predeceased him in 2009. Together they had two children; Nilanjana Choudhuri (born 1952) and Suranjana Chaudhury (born 1965).

For the last few years of his life, he was staying with his youngest daughter, Suranjana. He died at a private nursing home in Kolkata, on 12 October 2022, at the age of 93.

== Works ==
=== Poetry ===
- Angikar, Sanskriti Prakashani (1948)
- Jakhon Pratham Dhorechey Koli, Galpo Bhavan, Kolkata (1955)
- E Jonmer Nayak, Pratibha Prakashani, Kolkata (1962)
- Amar Hatey Rokto, Anubhab Prakashani, Kolkata (1967)
- Kaler Nisargo Drishyo, Anubhab Prakashani, Kolkata (1968)
- Duhsamay Kobitar Lekhoker Kachey, Shuksari Prakashak, Kolkata (1970)
- Kaler Rakhal Tumi Vietnam, Shankar Prakashan, Kolkata (1972)
- Je Jekhane Acho, Saraswat Library, Kolkata (1976)
- Shabdohin Shobhajatra, Shaibya Pustakalaya, Kolkata (1981)
- Hey Samay hey Sandhikshan, Roibatak, Kolkata (1991)
- Nirbachito Kabita, Saraswat Library, Kolkata (1996)
- Priyo Bak Katha Rakho, Shristi Prakashan (2001)
- Gangchiler Swapno O Satranga Ramdhanu, Ishkra, Kolkata (2005)
- Hantbo Thambona, Balark, Kolkata (2008)
- Jonakporee Homapakhi, Chotoder Kochipata, Kolkata (2008)
- Shrestho Kabita, Ekush Shatak, Kolkata (2016)
- Kabita Samagraha, Sarango Prakashani, Kolkata (2019) (ISBN 978-81-87518-22-8)

=== Verse drama ===
- Padadhwani Palatak, Saraswat Library, Kolkata (1974)
- Biruddho Batas, Dey Book Store, Kolkata (1989)
- Payer Shabdo Shona Jay, Swabhumi, Kolkata (1994)
- Jege Acho Barnamala, Krandasi Sahitya Patra, Kolkata (1996)
- Prachhadey Legeche Dhulo, Ishkara, Kolkata (2004)
- Nirbachita Kabyanatak, Saraswat Library, Kolkata (1984). Includes, Ek Ratrir Jonyo, Bodhyobhumitey Basarghar, Padadhwani Palatak, Nihato Godhuli, Andhokare Juin Phuler Gandho, Batighar.
- Kabyanatak Samgraha Pashchimbanga Bangla Akademi, Kolkata (2009) ISBN 978-81-7751-175-8. Includes, Bhorer Manushera, Sindhuparer Pakhi, Ami Nachiketa, Dana, Abhimanyu, Jege Acho Barnamala, Khorkuto, Biruddho Batas, Bikeler Baranda Periye, Payer Shabdo Shona Jay, Prachhadey Legeche Dhulo, Keya Phuler Gandho, Padadhwani Kar, Jai Utser Dikey, Ektai Jibon, Naditeyi Pratik, Golaper Juddho, Ghare Ferar Din, Jodiyo Sandhya, Pahar Dekechilo, Hey Samoy he Sandhikhon, Nihoto Godhuli, Badhyo Bhumitey Basarghar, Karun Rangin Path, Andhokare Juiphuler Gandho, Banojyotsna, Samabeto Karatali, Batighar, Padadhwani Palatak.

=== Unpublished staged verse drama ===
Phoolwali by Gandharva Natyagoshthee (1968/1969).

=== Travelogue ===
- Moscow theke Phera, Bak Sahitya Pvt. Ltd., Kolkata (1974)
- Anya Desh Anya Nagar, Popular Library, Kolkata (1981)

=== Memoirs ===
- At dashak Sat Kahan, Prativash, Kolkata (2016) ISBN 978-93-85392-93-1
- Jhanki Darshan, Ekush Satak, Kolkata (2019)

=== Non-fiction ===
- Boi Paruyar Dekha Manush, Ekush Satak, Kolkata (2014)

==== Fiction ====
- Purano Akharguli, The Shee Book Agency, Kolkata (2013) ISBN 978-81-924625-0-9

=== On Literature ===
- Adhunik Kabitar Utsa, Anubhab Prakashani, Kolkata (1969)
- Sahityer Sajghar, Ekush Satak, Kolkata (2015)

=== Journalism ===
- Sangbatikatar Darshan: Adarsha O Bichyuti (First edn. 2003, Second edn. 2015), Prativash, Kolkata ISBN 978-93-84265-33-5

=== Writings on historical perspectives ===
- Muktijuddhe Bangladesh, Shankar Prakashan, Kolkata (1971)
- Kolkata Teen Shatak (First edn. 1989, Second edn. 1994), Pashchimbanga Bangla Academy, Govt. of West Bengal
- Bharater Mukti Sangramey Bangla, Department of Information and Culture, Govt. of West Bengal. (1997)

=== Biography ===
- Deshnayak Subhash (First edn. 1997, Second edn. 2007), Pashchimbanga Bangla Academy, ISBN 978-81-775-1140-8
- Sangrami Sampadak Vivekananda Mukhopadhyay, National Book Trust, (2007) ISBN 978-81-237-4978-5

== Pen Names ==
Mallinath, Bidur, Anyadarshi

== Honours and awards ==
Sudha Basu Puraskar from Calcutta University, Poetry India Prize, Sisir Kumar Puraskar, Gauri Ghosal Smriti Puraskar, Tribritta Puraskar, Nazrul Puraskar given by Paschimbanga Bangla Akademi, Sarong Argha Nibedan from Sarong Literary Magazine, Great Bengal Purashkar, Amrita Purashkar, Muzaffar Ahmed Smriti Puraskar.
