= Palit Professor of Physics =

The Palit Chair of Physics is a physics professorship in the University of Calcutta, India. The post is named after Sir Taraknath Palit who donated Rs. 1.5 million to the university. The Nobel laureate physicist C. V. Raman was the first to be appointed to the post of Palit Professor of Physics in 1917. At present the holder of the chair is Amitava Raychaudhuri.

== List of Taraknath Palit Professors of Physics ==
| Name | Term |
|---|---|
| C. V. Raman | 1917-1932 |
| Debendra Mohan Bose | 1932-1938 |
| Meghnad Saha | 1938-1953 |
| Basanti Dulal Nagchaudhuri | 1953-1959 |
| Chanchal Kumar Majumdar | 1975-1982 |
| Amitava Raychaudhuri | |
