= Ganesh Prasad =

Indian mathematician (1876-1935)

- Born: 15 November 1876; Ballia, Uttar Pradesh, India
- Died: 9 March 1935 (aged 58); Agra, Uttar Pradesh, India
- Education: University of Allahabad; University of Calcutta; University of Cambridge; University of Göttingen
- Known for: Establishing the culture of organised mathematical research in India
- Notable work: A Treatise on Spherical Harmonics and the Functions of Bessel and Lame
- Title: Hardinge Professor of Mathematics

Ganesh Prasad (15 November 1876 – 9 March 1935) was an Indian mathematician who specialised in the theory of potentials, theory of functions of a real variable, Fourier series and the theory of surfaces. He was trained at the Universities of Cambridge and Göttingen and on return to India he helped develop the culture of mathematical research in India. The mathematical community of India considers Ganesh Prasad as the "Father of Mathematical Research in India". He was also an educator taking special interest in the advancement of primary education in the rural areas of India.

== Early life ==
Ganesh Prasad was born on 15 November 1876 at Ballia in a Srivastava Kayastha family. He obtained the B.A. degree from Muir Central College, Allahabad, M.A. degree from the Universities in Allahabad and Calcutta and the D.Sc. degree from Allahabad University. After teaching at the Kayasth Pathshala, Allahabad, and at the Muir Central College, Allahabad, for about two years, he proceeded to Cambridge for higher studies and research. While at Cambridge he became acquainted with mathematicians like E.W. Hobson and Andrew Forsyth. He also sat, though unsuccessfully, for the Adams prize competition.

Later he moved to Göttingen where he was associated with Arnold Sommerfeld, David Hilbert and Georg Cantor. In Göttingen, Prasad showed his paper titled On the constitution of matter and the analytical theories of heat, the one he had submitted for the Adams prize competition, to Felix Klein, who appreciated it very much and arranged its publication in the Göttingen Abhandlungen. Ganesh Prasad spent altogether about five years in Europe.

== Mathematical career ==
Prasad returned to India from Europe in 1904 and was appointed professor of mathematics at the Muir Central College, Allahabad. Within a year of his appointment at Allahabad, Prasad was sent to the Queen's College, Banaras and he continued there till 1914 when he was invited to head the mathematics department of Calcutta University. Ganesh Prasad was the Ras Behari Ghosh Chair of Applied Mathematics of Calcutta University (he was the first person to occupy this Chair) from 1914 to 1917 and Hardinge Professor of Mathematics in the same University from 1923 till his death on 9 March 1935. In between these two assignments he served Banaras Hindu University as professor of mathematics (1917–1923). While at Banaras, he helped found the Banaras Mathematical Society. Ganesh Prasad was elected President of the Calcutta Mathematical Society and the Vice-President of the Indian Association for Advancement of Science, Calcutta in 1924 and continued in the same position till his death. He was a founder member of the National Institute of Sciences, India, which has now been rechristened as the Indian National Science Academy. Ganesh Prasad authored 11 books including A Treatise on Spherical Harmonics and the Functions of Bessel and Lame and over fifty research papers in mathematics.

== Other areas of work ==
Ganesh Prasad worked hard for the promotion of education in general in the rural areas of Uttar Pradesh. He was instrumental in the introduction of compulsory primary education in villages in Uttar Pradesh. He donated from his private savings an amount of Rs. 22,000 for the education of girls in Ballia. He also donated an amount of Rupees two hundred thousand for establishing prizes for the toppers at the M.A. and MSc examinations of the Agra University. He donated large amounts of money to the Allahabad and Banaras Universities also.

== Works ==
- 1909: A Text-book of Differential Calculus, via Internet Archive
- 1929: "On the differentiability of the integral function", Journal fur die reine und angewandte Mathematik 160: 100–110 doi:10.1515/crll.1929.160.100
- 1930: "On the nature of Θ in the mean-value theorem of the differential calculus", Bulletin of the American Mathematical Society 36: 289–91 doi:10.1090/S0002-9904-1930-04937-X
- 1933: Some Great Mathematicians of the Nineteenth Century via Internet Archive

== See also ==
- List of Indian mathematicians
