= Debendra Mohan Bose =

Indian physicist (1885–1975)

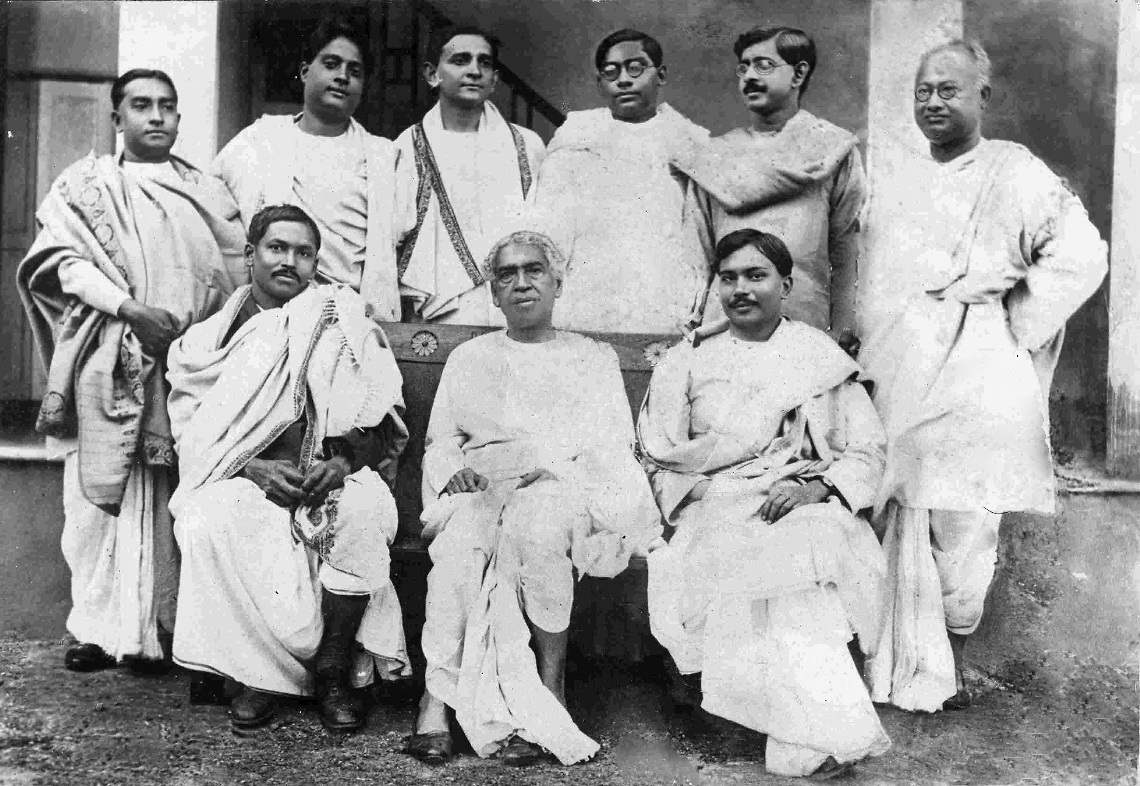
- Debendra Mohan Bose (standing, third from left) with other scientists of Calcutta University
- Born: 26 November 1885; Calcutta, Bengal Presidency, British India (modern-day Kolkata, West Bengal, India)
- Died: 2 June 1975 (aged 89); Calcutta, West Bengal, India
- Education: University of Calcutta; University of Berlin
- Spouse: Nalini Sircar (1919–1975)
- Scientific career
- Fields: Particle physics Nuclear physics Radiochemistry
- Workplaces: University of Calcutta; Cavendish Laboratory; University of Berlin; Bose Institute
- Doctoral advisor: Erich Regener
- Other academic advisors: Jagadish Chandra Bose; J. J. Thomson

Debendra Mohan Bose (26 November 1885 – 2 June 1975) was an Indian physicist who made contributions in the field of cosmic rays, artificial radioactivity and neutron physics. He was the first to discover mesons with Bibha Chowdhuri and was the longest serving Director (1938–1967) of Bose Institute. Bose was the nephew of the famous physicist Jagadish Chandra Bose, who laid the foundations of modern science in India.

== Early life ==
Debendra Mohan Bose was born in Calcutta (present day Kolkata) in a famous Brahmo family. He was the youngest son of Mohini Mohan Bose, one of the first Indians to proceed to USA to qualify himself in field of homeopathy. Ananda Mohan Bose was his paternal uncle, while Jagadish Chandra Bose was his maternal uncle. After his father's untimely death, Debendra's education was supervised by his uncle J. C. Bose.

Debendra's plan of getting a degree in engineering from the Bengal Engineering College, Shibpur was cut short when he suffered a severe malaria attack. Nobel laureate Rabindranath Tagore, a close friend of J. C. Bose, suggested him to pursue physics instead. In 1906, Debendra Bose obtained his Master of Arts degree from the University of Calcutta in first class. He stood first in the order of the merit in the examination. He also obtained his Bachelor of Arts degree from Calcutta University. He worked as a research scholar under Jagadish Chandra Bose for one year, during which he participated in his uncle's biophysical and plant physiological investigations.

== Education in Europe ==
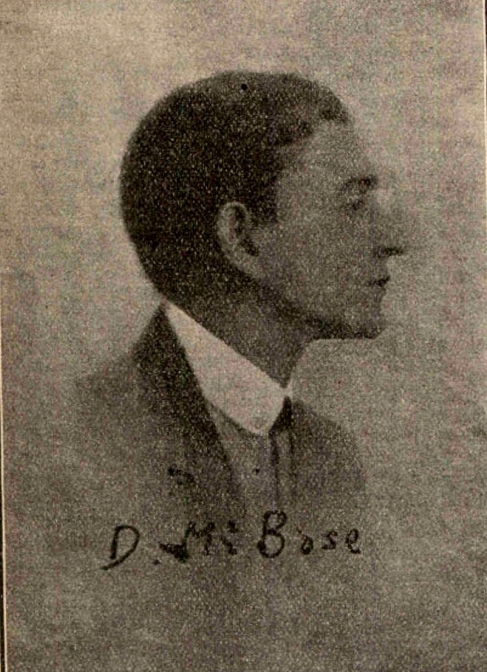

In 1907, he joined the Christ's College, Cambridge, and worked with prominent physicists including J. J. Thomson and Charles Thomson Rees Wilson at the Cavendish Laboratory. In 1910, he joined the Royal College of Science in London, from where he obtained a diploma and a BSc (first class) in Physics in 1912. Later, he returned to Calcutta and taught physics in the City College, Kolkata in 1913.

In 1914, D M Bose was appointed the Rashbehary Ghosh Professor of Physics in the newly founded Calcutta University College of Science. He was awarded the Ghosh Travel Fellowship for studying abroad, and chose to study advanced physics for two years at the Humboldt University in Berlin. In Berlin, Debendra was assigned to Professor Erich Regener's laboratory. His stay in Germany got extended to five years due to World War I. During this period, he worked on the development of a new type of cloud chamber, and was successful in photographing the tracks of recoil protons produced during the passage of fast moving alpha particles in the chamber. The results of his preliminary investigations were published in the journal Physikalische Zeitschrift in 1916 (a full paper was later published in Zeitschrift für Physik in 1922). He returned to India in March 1919 after obtaining his PhD.

== As an academic ==
In July 1919, D. M. Bose re-joined the Calcutta University as Rashbehary Ghosh Professor of Physics. In 1932, he succeeded Professor C. V. Raman as the Palit Professor of Physics. He was one of the only two Indian physicists (the other being Meghnad Saha) who participated at the Como Conference (11–20 September 1927) held at Lake Como in Italy. The conference featured 60 invited participants from 14 countries, including 11 Nobel laureates.

D. M. Bose encouraged several of his junior colleagues at the Calcutta University to pursue research. He gave Satyendra Nath Bose two books of Max Planck, Thermodynamik and Warmestrahlung (unavailable in India then). This led to S. N. Bose's interest in Planck's hypothesis and his deduction on a combinatorial basis of Planck's formula in 1925.

In 1938, D. M. Bose became the Director of Bose Institute after the death of the institute's founder J. C. Bose. In 1945, Bose was inducted as a nuclear chemistry expert in the Atomic Energy Committee of CSIR. The committee later became the Atomic Energy Commission (AEC).

== Research with Bibha Choudhuri ==
A discussion during the 1938 Science Congress Session prompted D. M. Bose and his colleague Bibha Chowdhuri to study cosmic rays using photographic plates. Since the particle accelerators were not available at this time, high-energy subatomic particles were only obtainable from atmospheric cosmic rays. Walther Bothe gave the duo the idea of considering photographic emulsion as a continuously active cloud chamber to register and store tracks.

Due to the World War II restrictions, full tone photographic plates were not available in India at that time. During 1939–1942, Bose and Choudhuri exposed Ilford half-tone photographic plates in the high altitude mountainous regions of Darjeeling, and observed long curved ionizing tracks that appeared to be different from the tracks of alpha particles or protons. In a series of articles published in Nature, they identified a cosmic particle having an average mass close to 200 times the mass of electron. Their research came to an end when Choudhuri left India in 1945 to work with Patrick Blackett in England.

In Europe, Cecil Frank Powell independently used exactly the same method to identify the new particle pi-meson (now pion), but with improved full-tone photographic emulsion plates. He was awarded the Nobel Prize in Physics in 1950 "for his development of the photographic method of studying nuclear processes and his discoveries regarding mesons made with this method". Powell acknowledge the method developed by Bose and Choudhuri as the first attempt in this field in his 1959 book The Study of Elementary Particles by the Photographic Method.

== Later life ==
As director of the Bose Institute, D. M. Bose expanded the activities of the existing departments and also opened the new department of microbiology. He was a dedicated worker of the Sadharan Brahmo Samaj and was served several years as its office bearer (President, Secretary & Treasurer). He was the General President of the Indian Science Congress Session in 1953 at Lucknow. Bose served as the director of the Bose Institute till 1967, when his arthritis and other health problems forced him to take retirement. In the later years of his life, he became more interested in philosophy focusing on the relationship between religion and science. He died on the morning of 2 June 1975.

=== Como Conference - S.N. Bose vs. D.M. Bose ===
In 1927 at the occasion of the 100th death anniversary of Italian physicist Alessandro Volta, in Como, a conference was organized (as mentioned above). D. M. Bose and M. N. Saha participated. In the late 1980s it was reported that the "wrong" Bose, that is, D. M. Bose attended the meeting. The invitation was supposed to be for S. N. Bose. The historical documents suggest that D. M. Bose was not the "wrong" person, because in those days his national and international status was far better than that of S.N. Bose.
