= D. R. Bhandarkar =

Indian archaeologist and epigraphist (1875–1950)

Devadatta Ramakrishna Bhandarkar
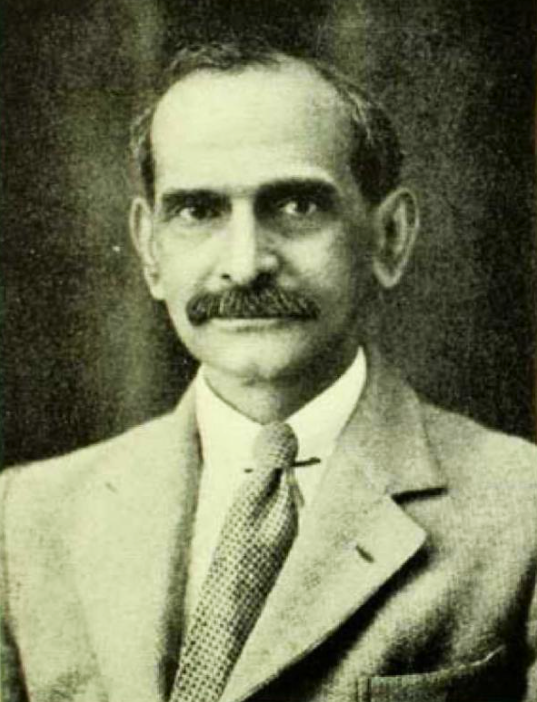
- Born: 19 November 1875
- Died: 13 May 1950 (aged 74)
- Known for: Archaeology
- Parent: Ramakrishna Gopal Bhandarkar (father)

Devadatta Ramakrishna Bhandarkar (Marathi: देवदत्त रामकृष्ण भांडारकर; 19 November 1875 – 13 May 1950) was an Indian archaeologist and epigraphist who worked with the Archaeological Survey of India (ASI). Born in Marathi Gaud Saraswat Brahmin family, he was the son of eminent Indologist, R. G. Bhandarkar.

== Early life ==
Bhandarkar was born on 19 November 1875. On graduating in history, Bhandarkar joined the ASI and was posted to the western circle as an assistant to Henry Cousin.

== Career ==
As Assistant Superintendent, Bhandarkar worked in the then Rajputana, excavating the city of Nagari in Chittorgarh district in 1915–16. He succeeded George Thibaut as the Carmichael Professor of Ancient Indian History and Culture in the University of Calcutta and held the post from 1917 to 1936.

Gandhiji met Dr. Bhandarkar in 1896 at Pune, Bombay Presidency in regards to the South African Indian question.

As Superintending Archeologist of the Western Circle of ASI, he visited Mohenjo-daro in 1911-12. He dismissed the ruins as only 200 years old, with 'bricks of a modern type' and 'a total lack of carved terra-cottas amidst the whole ruins'. John Keay had called his assessment as "wrong in every detail, this statement must rank amongst archaeology's greatest gaffes."
