= Archdeacon of Calcutta =

The archdeacon of Calcutta was a senior ecclesiastical officer within the Anglican Diocese of Calcutta, and dates back to the early 19th century. As such he was responsible for the disciplinary supervision of the clergy within his part of the diocese. It is now the Church of North India Diocese of Calcutta.
