= George Thibaut =

German Indologist

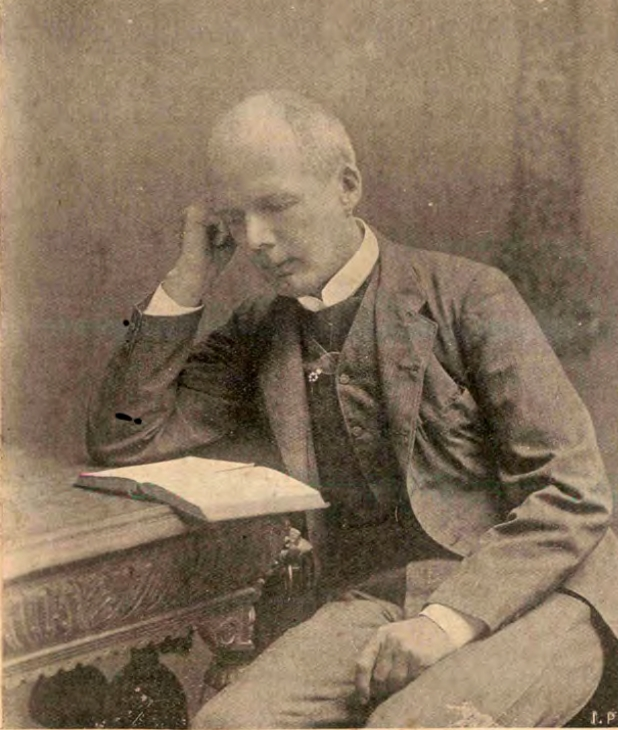

George Frederick William Thibaut CIE (March 20, 1848 – 1914) was a German Indologist notable for his contributions to the understanding of ancient Indian mathematics and astronomy.

== Life ==
Thibaut was born in Germany, worked briefly in England, and then in 1875, was appointed Professor at the Government Sanskrit College, Varanasi in northern India. From 1888 to 1895, he was professor at Muir Central College in Allahabad.

On 6 November 2014, in its column "100 Years Ago" The Statesman reprinted the following obituary on the late Dr. Thibaut:

The death is reported at Heidelberg Hospital, Germany of Dr George Thibaut, C.I.E., Ph.D., D.Sc., who recently retired from the Education Service as Registrar of the Calcutta University. Dr. Thibaut who took part in Franco-German War of 1870 as a noncommissioned officer joined the Muir Central College, Allahabad some 22 years ago as Professor of Philosophy. He rose to be the Principal of the College and was appointed Registrar of the Allahabad University, afterwards being transferred to Calcutta. Besides being a well-known student of philosophy Eastern and Western, the late Dr. Thibaut was an eminent Sanskrit scholar.

He was appointed CIE in the 1906 New Year Honours.

== Works ==
Between 1875 and 1878 Thibaut published a detailed essay on the Śulba sūtras, together with a translation of the Baudhāyana Śulba sūtra; he later translated the Pañca Siddhāntikā which he co-edited with Pandit Sudhakar Dwivedi (the latter added a Sanskrit commentary). He also edited and translated the following volumes in Max Müller's Sacred Books of the East:

- Vol. 34, The Vedanta-Sutras, vol. 1 of 3, with the commentary of Sankaracharya, part 1 of 2. Adhyâya I–II (Pâda I–II). (1890)
- Vol. 38, The Vedanta-Sutras, vol. 2 of 3, with the commentary of Sankaracharya, part 1 of 2. Adhyâya II (Pâda III–IV)–IV. (1896)

It was one of the earliest translation of the Brahma Sutras along with the work of Paul Deussen.

- Vol. 48, The Vedanta-Sutras, vol. 3 of 3, with the commentary of Râmânuja. (1904)

Thibaut contributed a number of Sanskrit manuscripts to the Department of Oriental Collections, Bodleian Library, University of Oxford, where they are archived today.
