= Weeble =

Toy produced by Playskool

Weebles
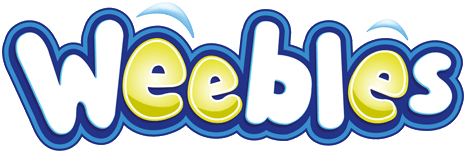
- Type: Roly-poly toy
- Company: Playskool (1971–84); Hasbro (1984–present)
- Country: United States
- Availability: 1971–present
- Slogan: "Weebles wobble, but they don't fall down"

Weebles are a range of children's roly-poly toys that was introduced in 1971 by the United States toy company Playskool, then a subsidiary of Milton Bradley Company. The toy brand is currently owned and marketed by Hasbro as part of the Playskool brand since 1984, when Hasbro acquired Milton Bradley.

The Weebles are egg-shaped toys designed with a weighted bottom-center. When tilted, the center of mass is raised, and upon release, gravity returns the toy to its original upright position. Weebles have been designed with a variety of shapes, including some designed to look like people or animals.

The catchphrase "Weebles wobble, but they don't fall down" was used in advertising during their rise in popularity in the 1970s and during successive relaunches in the early 2000s. The line was coined by advertising executive J. Mitchell Reed in his Madison Avenue office in New York City.

In the United Kingdom, Weebles were manufactured and marketed by Airfix under licence from 1973 until Airfix's collapse in 1981.

In 2023, PlayMonster acquired an international licence from Hasbro to manufacture and sell Weebles.

== Design principle ==
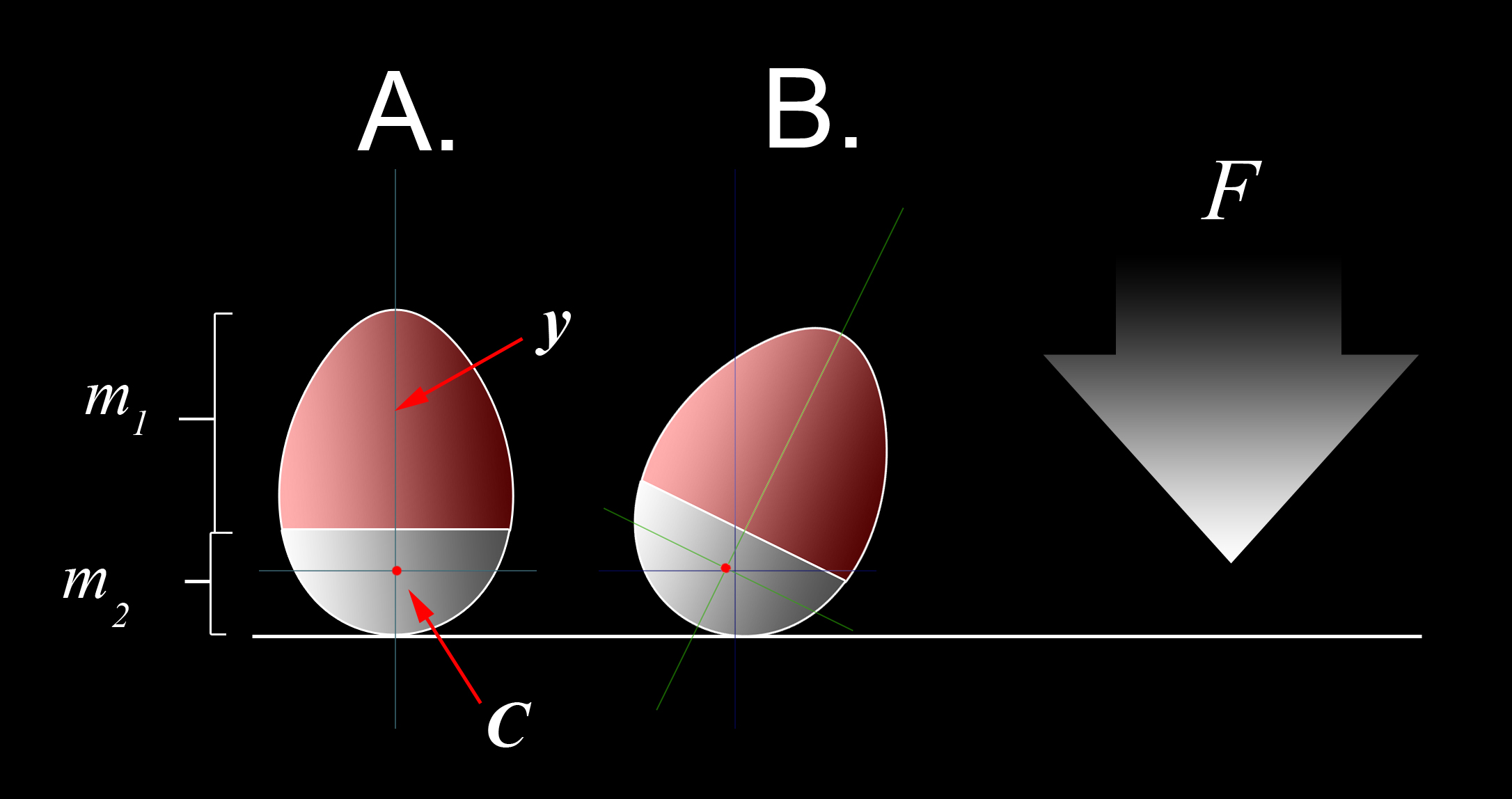
Diagram of the principles of operation of a Weeble. The grey material is of a higher density than the red material, causing the center of mass of the object (labelled C) to be very low. This means that when the Weeble is wobbled, as in position B, the center of mass will be on the other side of the pivot point (where the Weeble is in contact with the ground), and so gravity will cause it to return to an upright position

Weeble is shaped like an egg. In order for it to work as intended, the shape must have a bottom which is a more or less smooth (unfaceted) hemisphere (to allow the Weeble to roll) and from the central vertical axis the shape must be nearly cylindrically symmetrical (that is, any plane cut through the vertical axis line must produce close to the same profile). Next, the shape must be filled with two basic types of unmixed solids, and the volume of the lighter solid must be greater than that of the heavier solid. Next, the overall shape must have constant positive curvature. Next, the relationship between the heavy solid and the light solid must be such that any orientation of the object off of the vertical axis line must cause the object's centroid to raise and to become offset. Lastly, the object must have only one position in which it can achieve stable mechanical equilibrium.

== List of playsets ==
Numerous playsets were made and marketed in the US throughout the 1970s including a Haunted House, Treehouse, Tarzan, Camper, Playground, Marina, Circus, Fun House, Mickey Mouse Club Set, Mickey Mouse Magic Kingdom, Western Theme Set, Weekender and others. Playsets often came with certain figures, though these could also be purchased separately.

The Weebles 1971–2011 Price Guide and Index lists and shows every Weeble model made over the preceding 40 years. There are 116 Weebles in total (83 regular; 21 peelable; 12 tumbling) including all egg-shaped sizes and variations made during 1971–1983. In 2011 Hasbro started making a new line of larger egg-shaped Weebles and had produced 42 new Weebles by July 2011. A wide range of accessories was available for the Weebles, including vehicles, buildings and furniture. Some sets had themes, such as the Weebles circus set.

There are 44 Weebles sets that include at least one Weebles figure and a vehicle, or larger sets made between 1972 and 1982.

A new line of Weebles was created in 2004 that were not egg-shaped but rather shaped like different animals. These were produced for a couple of years.

=== Weebleville (2004–2005) ===
- Weebleville Town Center
- Weeschool
- Wegetable Stand
- Weebles Barn Dance
- Weehicles (four sets)
- Weemobile
- Wescue Wagon
- Weegoaway Camper
- Weebly Wobbly Tree House
- Figures
- Mini Weebles Pals (larger figures)

Cartoon Episode 10 "Welcome to Weebleville!" "Weebles to the Wescue" "Spaghetti Days" "Tooey's Wobbly Weekend" "The Wednesday Race" "Bumpus' New House" "The Weebles Day Parade" "Birdie Lee's Colorful Day" "Tibby and the Weebles Band" "Mac & Cheese, Please! Beans & Franks? Thanks!"

=== Storybook World (2006) ===
- Hansel and Gretel's Wobbly Adventure
- Jack and Jill's Wobbly Adventure
- Goldilocks' Adventure Cottage
- Cinderella Carriage
- Weebly Knight & Ogre Adventure
- Weebalot Castle
- Figures

=== New Weebles (since 2011) ===
- Musical Treehouse
- Wobble-Go-Round
- Figures
- Weebles on the Bus
- Bobblin' Boat
- Wobblin' Wings
- Turnin' Whirlin' Racers
- Turn 'n Tumble Home
- Rock 'n Wobble Playground

== In popular culture ==
- In 1975, the Macy's Thanksgiving Day Parade introduced a balloon of the standard Weeble design, which lasted until 1978. Almost 20 years later, balloonicles with the Weebles characters Tibbey, Tooey, and Bumpus made their debut.

== See also ==
- Weebl and Bob
- Okiagari-koboshi
- Daruma doll
- Gömböc
