= Dairyū-ji =

Dairyū-ji (大龍寺) is the name of multiple Buddhist temples in Japan:

- Dairyū-ji (Aizuwakamatsu), in Aizuwakamatsu, Fukushima Prefecture
- Dairyū-ji (Gifu) in Gifu, Gifu Prefecture
- Dairyū-ji (Kobe), in Kobe, Hyōgo Prefecture
- Dairyū-ji (Higashiōsaka), in Higashiōsaka, Osaka Prefecture

== See also ==
- Tairyūji, in Anan, Tokushima Prefecture
