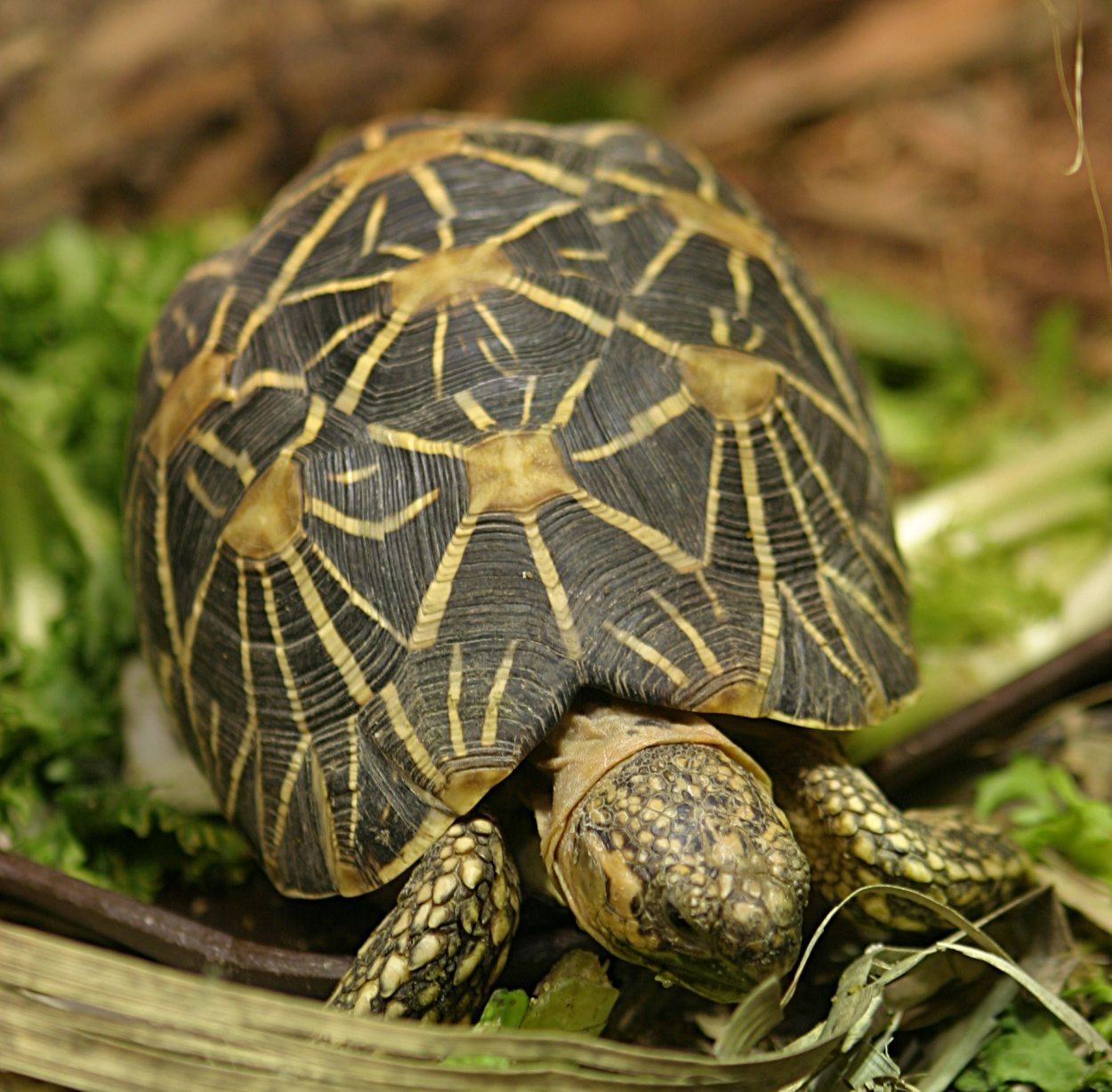
- G. elegans

Scientific classification
- Kingdom: Animalia
- Phylum: Chordata
- Class: Reptilia
- Order: Testudines
- Suborder: Cryptodira
- Family: Testudinidae
- Genus: Geochelone; Fitzinger, 1835

Species
- G. elegans G. platynota

= Geochelone =

Geochelone Temporal range: Miocene to present

Genus of tortoises

Geochelone, from Ancient Greek γῆ (gê), meaning "earth", and χελώνη (khelṓnē), meaning "turtle", is a genus of tortoises.

Geochelone tortoises, which are also known as typical tortoises or terrestrial turtles, can be found in southern Asia. They primarily eat plants.

== Species ==
The genus consists of two extant species:

Image	Common name	Scientific name	Distribution
	Indian star tortoise	Geochelone elegans	India, Pakistan and Sri Lanka.
	Burmese star tortoise	Geochelone platynota	Myanmar

A number of tortoise species have been recently removed from the genus. This taxon as formerly defined was "polyphyletic, representing at least five independent clades". Tortoises removed include members of Aldabrachelys (from the Seychelles and Madagascar), Astrochelys (Madagascar), Chelonoidis (South America and the Galápagos Islands), Stigmochelys and Centrochelys (Africa), and the extinct Megalochelys (southern Asia). These species are also unique for their ability to remember patterns and spatial pathways. Similar to mammals, these tortoises can remember directions and pathways by remembering the correct pathways in their long-term memory.

== "Self-righting" shell ==
The form of the shell of the Indian star tortoise resembles a gömböc, allowing it to turn over when lying upside down very easily.
