= Monostatic polytope =

Monostatic polyhedron described Conway, Goldberg & Guy (1969)

3D model of Reshetov's monostatic polyhedron

In geometry, a monostatic polytope or unistable polyhedron is a $d$-polytope which "can stand on only one face". They were described in 1969 by J. H. Conway, M. Goldberg, R. K. Guy and K. C. Knowlton. The monostatic polytope in 3-space (a monostatic polyhedron) constructed independently by Guy and Knowlton has 19 faces. In 2011 Andras Bezdek discovered an 18-face solution, and in 2014 Alex Reshetov published a 14-face polyhedron.

== Definition ==
A polytope is called monostatic if, when filled homogeneously, it is stable on only one facet. Alternatively, a polytope is monostatic if its centroid (the center of mass) has an orthogonal projection in the interior of only one facet.

== Properties ==
- No convex polygon in the plane is monostatic. This was shown by V. Arnold via reduction to the four-vertex theorem.
- There are no monostatic simplices in dimension up to eight. In dimension 3, this is due to Conway. In dimensions up to 6, this is due to R. J. M. Dawson. Dimensions 7 and 8 were ruled out by R. J. M. Dawson, W. Finbow, and P. Mak.
- (R. J. M. Dawson) There exist monostatic simplices in dimension 10 and up.
- There are monostatic polytopes in dimension 3 whose shapes are arbitrarily close to a sphere, and three-dimensional with $k$-fold rotational symmetry for an arbitrary positive integer $k$.

== See also ==
- Gömböc
- Roly-poly toy
