= Soft cell =

Type of geometric shape

In mathematics, a soft cell is a shape with curved edges that can tile the 2D plane or 3D space. The class of shapes was discovered in 2024 by Gábor Domokos, Alain Goriely, Ákos G. Horváth and Krisztina Regős.

The shapes are found in a wide variety of phenomena in nature, such as river estuaries, muscle fibres, and the seashell chambers of the nautilus.

According to Maths.ox.ac.uk, "The geometry of [... these] cells is similar to polyhedra, defined by a set of vertices, edges and faces. However [...] the edges of [... these] cells need not be straight and their faces need not be planar".
