= Gábor Domokos =

Hungarian mathematician and engineer

- Born: 12 November 1961 (age 64); Budapest, Hungary
- Education: Budapest University of Technology and Economics
- Known for: Gömböc
- Spouse: Réka Domokos
- Scientific career
- Fields: Applied mathematics
- Thesis: (1989)

Gábor Domokos (born 12 November 1961) is a Hungarian mathematician and engineer. He and his collaborators discovered geometrical shapes (including the gömböc and the soft cell) with unexpected or surprising balance or tiling properties.

== Career ==
Domokos spent most of his career at the Budapest University of Technology and Economics (BME), where he received his MSc degree in architecture and engineering in 1986, and defended a PhD in 1989 and habilitation in 1996. He became a full professor at BME in 1996, and in 2002 was appointed as head of Department of Mechanics, Materials and Structures. In 2004, he was elected to the Hungarian Academy of Sciences as its youngest member, first as a corresponding member and since 2010 as a full member.

== Research ==
Domokos is mostly known for his work on mono-monostatic bodies, that is, convex bodies that have one stable and one unstable point of balance. In 1995 he met Russian mathematician Vladimir Arnold, who suggested that 3D mono-monostatic bodies do exist and urged Domokos to find one. Aided by his wife, Domokos developed a classification system for 3D objects based on their points of equilibrium by analyzing pebbles and noting their equilibrium points. In one experiment, the couple tried 2000 pebbles collected at the beaches of the Greek island of Rhodes and found no single mono-monostatic body among them, illustrating the difficulty of the problem.

In 2006 Domokos and his student Péter Várkonyi theoretically found a stable class of mono-monostatic solutions, which they named gömböc (a diminutive of gömb meaning a "sphere" in Hungarian). Later they manufactured a series of gömböcs for various institutions, museums and exhibitions, such as the World Expo 2010. They also applied their gömböc-inspired shape analysis to the evolution of tortoises, relating their body structure and the ability to turn over when upside down. On 13 February 2009, a gömböc appeared on BBC One Friday night show QI, where host Stephen Fry demonstrated its properties and Domokos, who was in the audience, explained its history and relation to turtles.

He proved that the average geometrical shape was cuboid. He was co-discoverer with Alain Goriely, Ákos G. Horváth, and Krisztina Regős of a new shape named soft cell in 2024. In 2025 he created with Gergö Almádi a four-sided, monostable solid, the existence of which had been a longstanding open problem.

== Awards ==
- Knight's Cross of the Republic of Hungary (2007).
