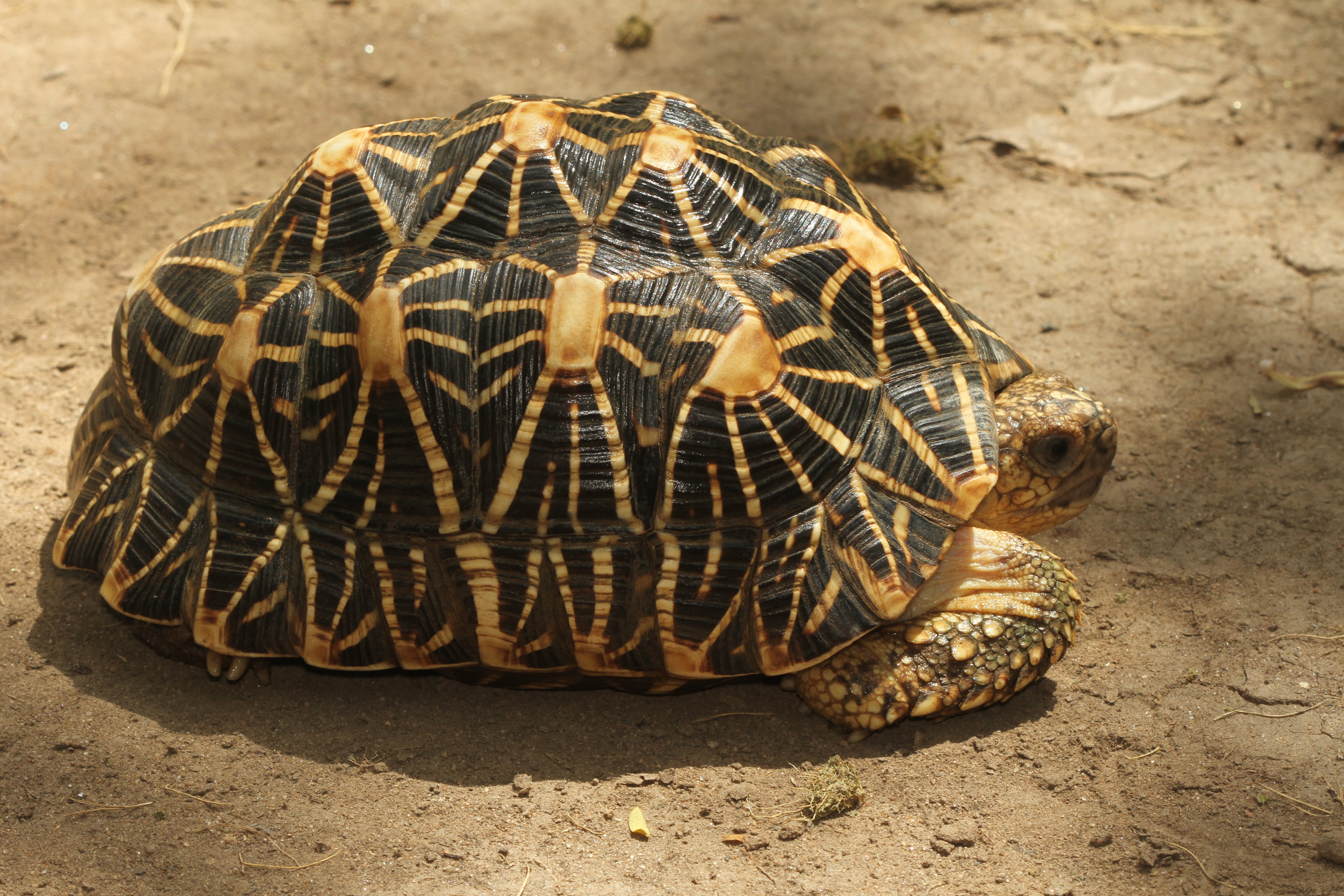

Conservation status
- Vulnerable (IUCN 3.1)
- CITES Appendix I

Scientific classification
- Kingdom: Animalia
- Phylum: Chordata
- Class: Reptilia
- Order: Testudines
- Suborder: Cryptodira
- Family: Testudinidae
- Genus: Geochelone
- Species: G. elegans

Binomial name
- Geochelone elegans Schoepff, 1795

Synonyms
- Testudo elegans Schoepff, 1795; Testudo stellata Schweigger, 1812; Chersine elegans Merrem, 1820; Testudo actinoides Bell, 1828; Testudo actinodes Gray, 1831 (ex errore); Geochelone (Geochelone) stellata Fitzinger, 1835; Testudo megalopus Blyth, 1853; Peltastes stellatus Gray, 1870; Geochelone elegans Loveridge & Williams, 1957; Geochelone elegans elegans Obst, 1985; Geochelone elagans Sharma, 1998 (ex errore)

= Indian star tortoise =

Species of tortoise

The Indian star tortoise (Geochelone elegans) is a threatened tortoise species native to India, Pakistan and Sri Lanka where it inhabits dry areas and scrub forest. It has been listed as Vulnerable on the IUCN Red List since 2016, as the population is thought to comprise more than 10,000 individuals, but with a declining trend. It is threatened by habitat loss and poaching for the illegal wildlife trade. It was upgraded to CITES Appendix I in 2019 by full consensus among all member states, giving it the highest level of international protection from commercial trade. Conservation group TRAFFIC found 6,040 were seized globally that were intended to be sold in the pet trade. Currently they are commonly bred in many countries to be sold as pets.

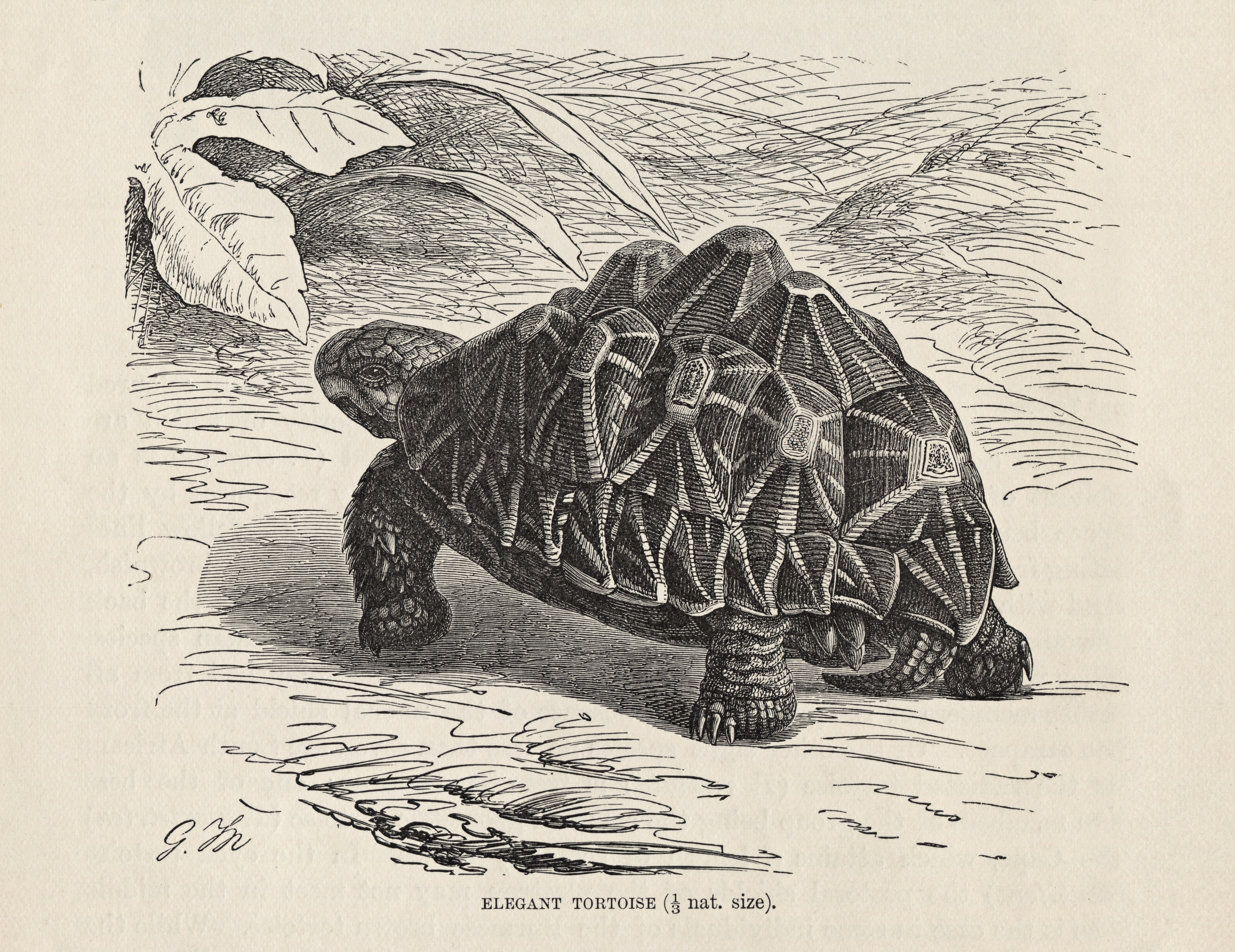
Engraving of an Indian star tortoise from "The Royal Natural History" (1896)

== Anatomy and morphology ==
The carapace of G. elegans is very convex, with dorsal shields often forming humps; the lateral margins are nearly vertical; the posterior margin is somewhat expanded and strongly serrated. It has no nuchal scute, and the supracaudal is undivided, and curved inward in the male; the shields are strongly striated concentrically. The first vertebral scute is longer than broad, and the others are broader than long, with the third at least as broad as the corresponding costal. The plastron is large, truncated or openly notched in front, and deeply notched and bifid behind; the suture between the humerals is much longer than that between the femorals; the suture between the pectorals is very short; the axillary and inguinal sutures are rather small. The head is moderate in size, with the forehead swollen, convex, and covered with rather small and irregular shields; the beak is feebly hooked, bi- or tricuspid; the edges of the jaws are denticulated; the alveolar ridge of the upper jaw is strong. The outer-anterior face of the fore limbs have numerous unequal-sized, large, imbricate, bony, pointed tubercles; the heel has large, more or less spur-like tubercles; a group of large conical or subconical tubercles is found on the hinder side of the thigh. The carapace is black, with yellow areolae from which yellow streaks radiate; these streaks are usually narrow and very numerous. The plastron likewise has black and yellow, radiating streaks. The Indian star tortoise can grow to 10 inches long.

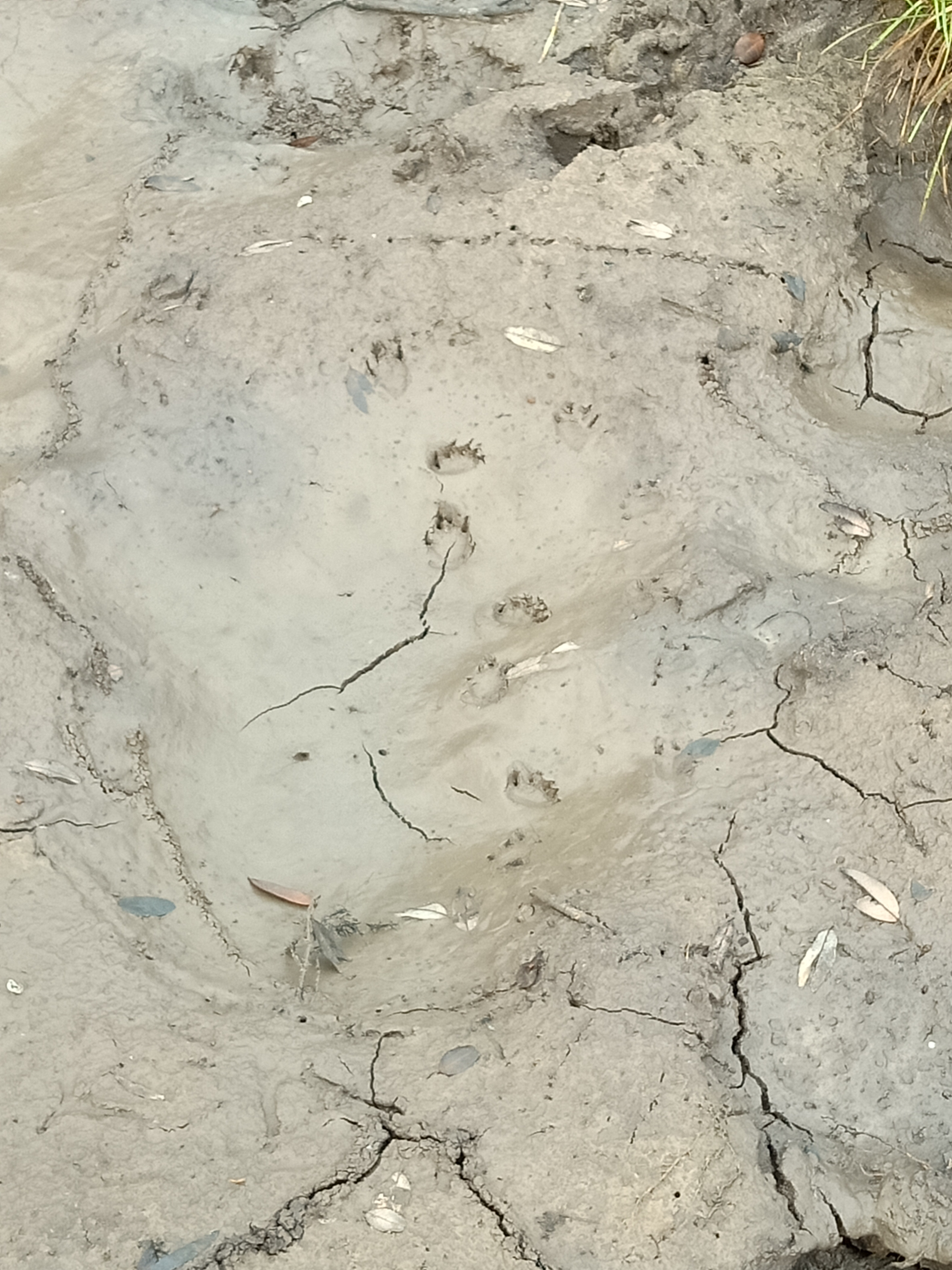
Footprints

The patterning, although highly contrasting, is disruptive and breaks the outline of the tortoise as it sits in the shade of grass or vegetation. They are mostly herbivorous and feed on grasses, fallen fruit, flowers, and leaves of succulent plants, and will occasionally eat carrion. In captivity, however, they should never be fed meat.

The sexual dimorphism of adult Indian star tortoises is quite apparent. Females are considerably larger than their male counterparts. In addition, the females' plastrons are much flatter than those of the males, which have a concave shape.

The shape of this creature is presumed to be specially adapted to naturally assist it to return to a stable stance after it has been turned over. Mathematicians Gábor Domokos of the Budapest University of Technology and Economics and Péter Várkonyi of Princeton University designed a homogeneous object called a gömböc that has exactly one unstable balance point and exactly one stable balance point. Just as a bottom-weighted (nonhomogeneous weight distribution) sphere would always return to the same upright position, they found it was possible to construct a shape that behaves the same way. After that, they noted the similarity to the Indian star tortoise and subsequently tested 30 turtles by turning them upside down. They found many of them to be self-righting.

== Distribution and habitat ==
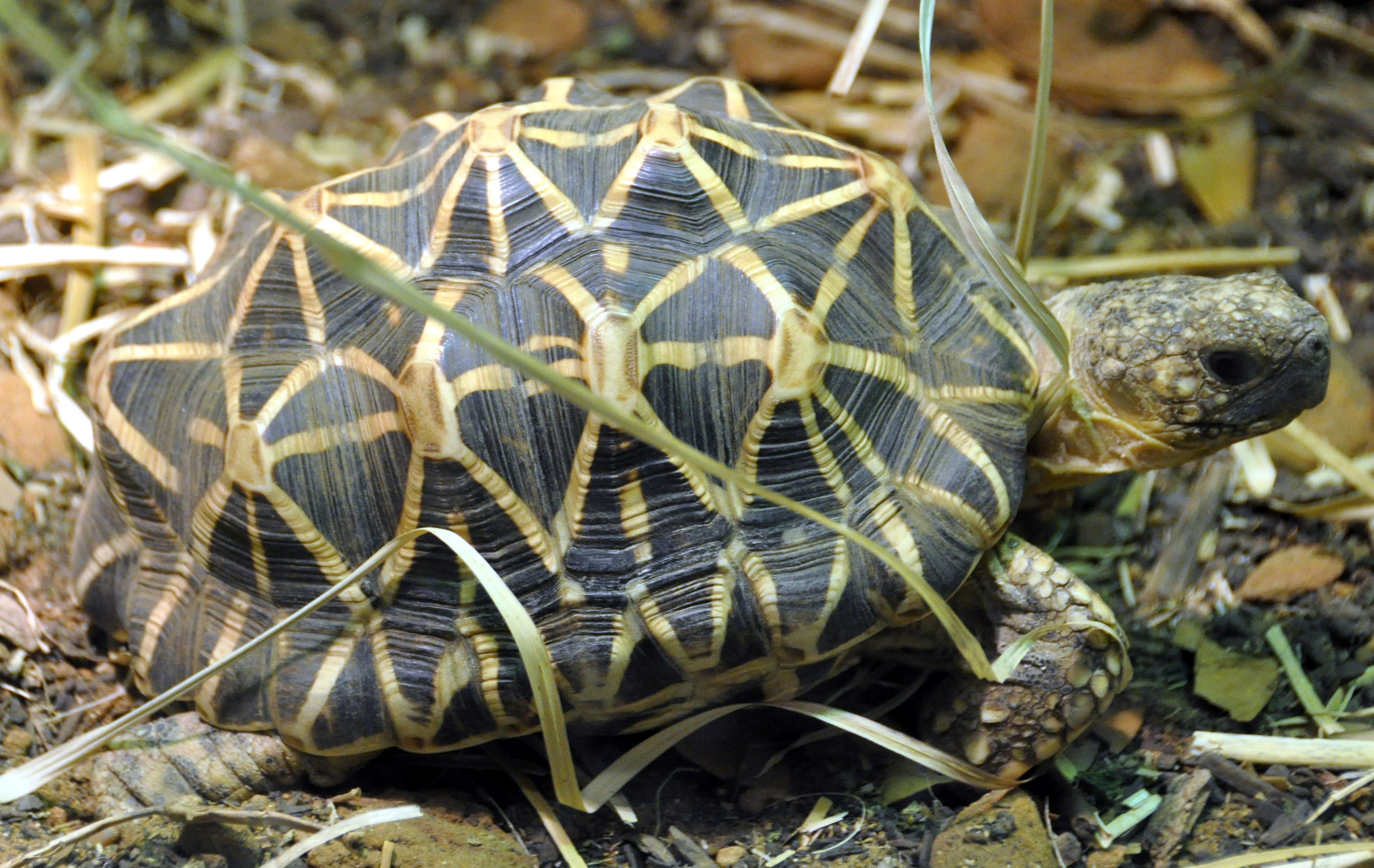
Adult in Houston Zoo

Indian star tortoises are native to parts of western and southeastern India, the island of Sri Lanka, and southeastern Pakistan. Although there are no recognized subspecies, there are variations in color and morphology between the tortoises found in the different regions. The Indian star tortoises found in southeastern India tend to be a bit smaller and have a lighter, more contrasting pattern on their shell compared to the ones found in northern India. The tortoises in Sri Lanka tend to have wider yellow markings and are generally larger than the tortoises found in India. Little used to be known about the phylogeographic differentiation in the Indian star tortoises until a study done by Gaur in 2006. The study revealed that the tortoises from the distribution patches between India and Sri Lanka are indeed distinct. These tortoises are known to widely inhabit many different types of habitats across India, Sri Lanka, and Pakistan. They have displayed a very high tolerance to areas with seasonally dry and wet habitats. Star tortoises have been found in rainy deciduous forests, dry grasslands, and even semi-desert lands.

== Reproduction and young ==
Females typically reach sexual maturity around 8–12 years old, while males reach sexual maturity around 6–8 years old. Males will compete for mates and assert dominance by ramming into other males and trying to flip them onto their backs. Around 60–90 days after the female mates, she will search and try to find an area to dig a nest where she will then lay her eggs. Female star tortoises can lay anywhere from one to nine clutches annually, with each clutch containing one to ten eggs. After she lays her eggs, she will cover them back up with the sand and the eggs have to be incubated for 50–180 days. The egg of a star tortoise is a hard but also brittle shell that usually weighs 12-21 grams each. When the eggs are first laid they are a pinkish translucent color, then after 2–3 weeks, the eggs become white. The determination of the sex of the tortoises is temperature-dependent. With temperatures between 28-30 degrees Celsius, mostly males will hatch. Temperatures between 31-32 degrees Celsius will result in mostly females hatching. Instead of having a distinctive star, the hatchlings' carapace is a black or brown color with yellow rectangular blotches.

== Illegal pet trade and CITES ==
Indian star tortoises are the most transported and illegally sold tortoise and turtle. Although they are native to India, Pakistan, and Sri Lanka, they are found all over Southeast Asia, the United States, Europe, and many other countries. There is such a high demand for these tortoises, that roughly 10,000-20,000 are taken from the wild each year and sold around the world. Only around 3,000 of those tortoises are rescued from smugglers and markets. There were over 6,000 Indian star tortoises seized from illegal trade across India, Thailand, and Bangladesh in 2017. Tortoises can go many days without food and are very quiet, which makes them easier to smuggle. Smugglers will collect a large amount of the tortoises, tape their legs, and put all of them in small containers, bags, and boxes. Even though they are smuggled in large amounts, many of the tortoises end up dying before they even get sold due to the harsh conditions they endure such as stress, suffocation, cracked shells, and not being able to move. The illegal pet trade continues to devastate the populations of these tortoises and could even potentially cause extinction among the species. CITES is broken up into three different appendixes depending on the level of protection needed and is currently protecting over 38,000 species. In 2019, the Indian star tortoises were added to Appendix I of CITES after being listed under Appendix II for many years. This means that the commercial trade of these tortoises or even parts of the tortoises is completely banned. In 2020 and 2021, after being added to Appendix I, the Wildlife Protection Society of India reported that authorities had seized over 3,500 tortoises. Currently they are commonly bred in many countries to be sold as pets.

== Disease ==
In addition to the threat of the illegal pet trade and habitat loss, diseases can also be a huge threat to the population of the Indian star tortoises. Star tortoises are extremely susceptible to pneumonia and respiratory diseases, which often lead to fatalities among individuals. Human handling and the transportation of these tortoises under inhumane conditions will increase the risk of diseases and parasites causing a large number of deaths. Many of them caught for the illegal pet trade are at high risk of dying from unexpected diseases and many do not end up making it to a home to even become a pet.
