= Tennis ball theorem =

On inflection points of spherical curves

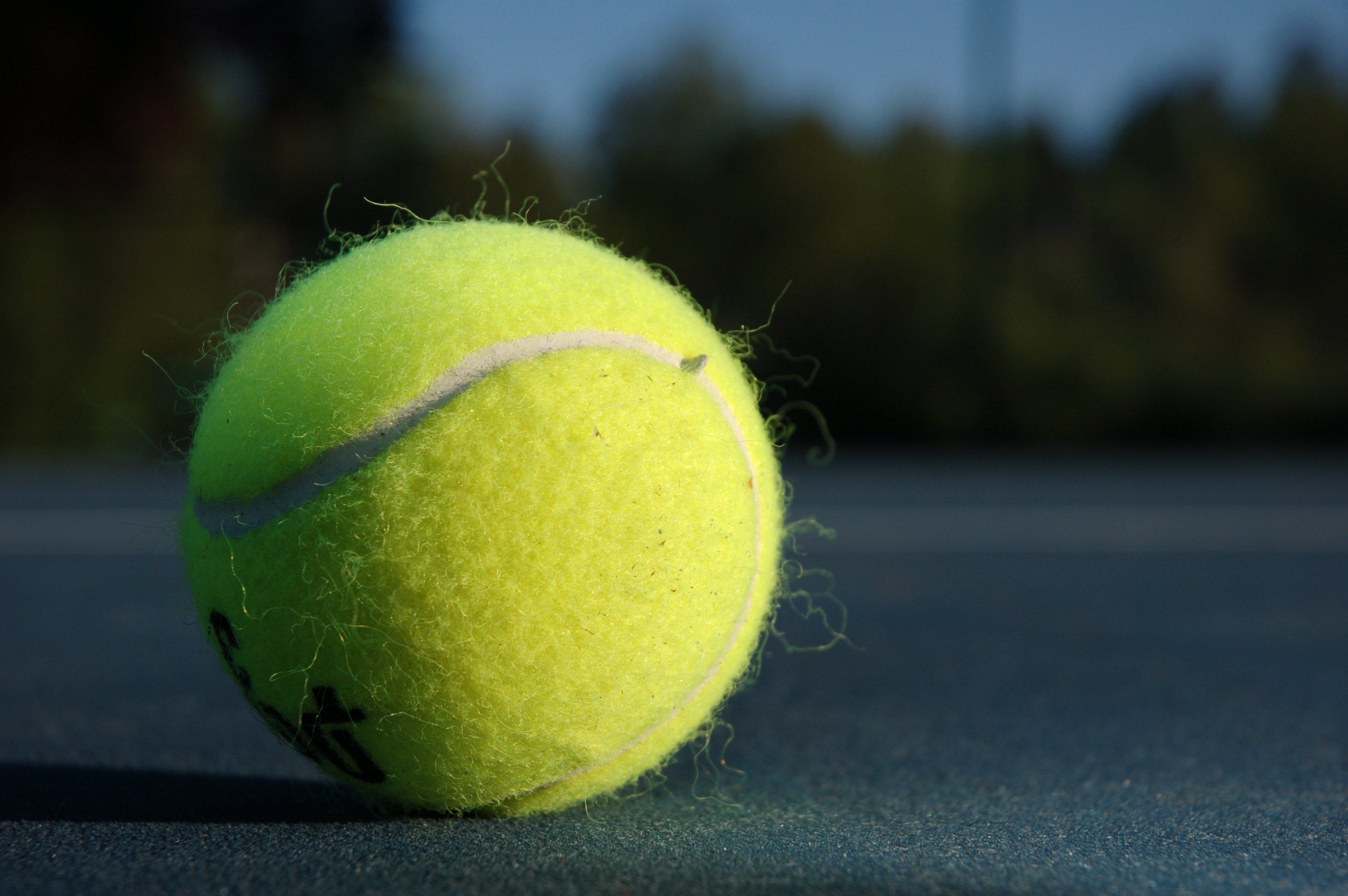
A tennis ball

In differential geometry, the tennis ball theorem states that any smooth curve on the surface of a sphere that divides the sphere into two equal-area subsets without touching or crossing itself must have at least four inflection points, points at which the curve does not consistently bend to only one side of its tangent line. The tennis ball theorem was first published under this name by Vladimir Arnold in 1994, and is often attributed to Arnold, but a closely related result appears earlier in a 1968 paper by Beniamino Segre, and the tennis ball theorem itself is a special case of a theorem in a 1977 paper by Joel L. Weiner. The name of the theorem comes from the standard shape of a tennis ball, whose seam forms a curve that (when suitably smoothed) meets the conditions of the theorem; the same kind of curve is also used for the seams on baseballs.

The tennis ball theorem can be generalized to any curve that is not contained in a closed hemisphere. A centrally symmetric curve on the sphere must have at least six inflection points. The theorem is analogous to the four-vertex theorem according to which any smooth closed plane curve has at least four points of extreme curvature.

== Statement ==
Precisely, an inflection point of a doubly continuously differentiable ($C^2$) curve on the surface of a sphere is a point $p$ with the following property: let $I$ be the connected component containing $p$ of the intersection of the curve with its tangent great circle at $p$. (For most curves $I$ will just be $p$ itself, but it could also be an arc of the great circle.) Then, for $p$ to be an inflection point, every neighborhood of $I$ must contain points of the curve that belong to both of the hemispheres separated by this great circle. The theorem states that every $C^2$ curve that partitions the sphere into two equal-area components has at least four inflection points in this sense.

== Examples ==
The tennis ball and baseball seams can be modeled mathematically by a curve made of four semicircular arcs, with exactly four inflection points where pairs of these arcs meet. A great circle also bisects the sphere's surface, and has infinitely many inflection points, one at each point of the curve. However, the condition that the curve divide the sphere's surface area equally is a necessary part of the theorem. Other curves that do not divide the area equally, such as circles that are not great circles, may have no inflection points at all.

== Proof by curve shortening ==
One proof of the tennis ball theorem uses the curve-shortening flow, a process for continuously moving the points of the curve towards their local centers of curvature. Applying this flow to the given curve can be shown to preserve the smoothness and area-bisecting property of the curve. Additionally, as the curve flows, its number of inflection points never increases. This flow eventually causes the curve to transform into a great circle, and the convergence to this circle can be approximated by a Fourier series. Because curve-shortening does not change any other great circle, the first term in this series is zero, and combining this with a theorem of Sturm on the number of zeros of Fourier series shows that, as the curve nears this great circle, it has at least four inflection points. Therefore, the original curve also has at least four inflection points.

== Related theorems ==
A generalization of the tennis ball theorem applies to any simple smooth curve on the sphere that is not contained in a closed hemisphere. As in the original tennis ball theorem, such curves must have at least four inflection points. If a curve on the sphere is centrally symmetric, it must have at least six inflection points.

A closely related theorem of Segre (1968) also concerns simple closed spherical curves, on spheres embedded into three-dimensional space. If, for such a curve, $o$ is any point of the three-dimensional convex hull of a smooth curve on the sphere that is not a vertex of the curve, then at least four points of the curve have osculating planes passing through $o$. In particular, for a curve not contained in a hemisphere, this theorem can be applied with $o$ at the center of the sphere. Every inflection point of a spherical curve has an osculating plane that passes through the center of the sphere, but this might also be true of some other points.

This theorem is analogous to the four-vertex theorem, that every smooth simple closed curve in the plane has four vertices (extreme points of curvature). It is also analogous to a theorem of August Ferdinand Möbius that every non-contractible smooth curve in the projective plane has at least three inflection points.
