= Roly-poly toy =

Toy that rights itself when tipped over

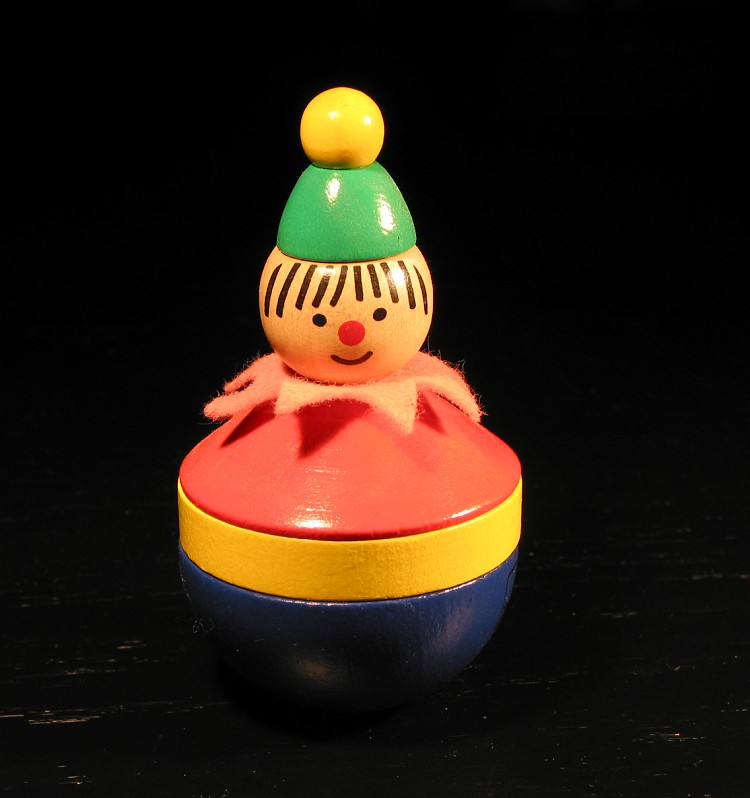
A wooden roly-poly toy

A roly-poly toy (also called a roly-poly doll, round-bottomed doll, tilting doll, tumbler, wobbly man, wobble doll, or Kelly) is a round-bottomed toy, usually egg-shaped, that tends to right itself when pushed at an angle, and does this in seeming contradiction to how it should fall.

== Models ==
Different toy manufacturers and different cultures have produced different-looking roly-poly toys: the okiagari-koboshi (起き上がり小法師, "take a spill, get up, and arise"), Kokeshi doll and some types of Daruma doll of Japan, the nevаlyashka (неваляшка, "untopply") or van'ka-vstan'ka (ванька-встанька, "Ivan-get-up") of Russia, and Playskool's Weebles. Such toys' self-righting characteristics have come to symbolize the ability to have success, overcome adversity, and recover from misfortune.

Traditional Chinese examples (called 不倒翁, bù dǎo wēng) are hollow clay figures of plump children, but "many Chinese folk artists shape their tumblers in the image of clownish mandarins as they appear on stage; in this way, they mock the inefficiency and ineptitude of the bureaucrats".

Fisher-Price, a well-known toy manufacturer, recommends roly-poly toys for small children just developing motor skills; a child can bat at it without its rolling away.

== Construction ==
This figurine has a low center of mass (represented by a bullseye) because it is mostly hollow with a weight at the bottom.

When the figurine is pushed, the height of the center of mass rises from the green line to the orange line, and the center of mass is no longer over the point of contact with the ground.

The toy is typically hollow with a weight inside the bottom hemisphere. The placement of this weight is such that the toy has a center of mass below the center of the hemisphere, so that any tilting raises the center of mass. When such a toy is pushed over, it wobbles for a few moments while it seeks the upright orientation, which has an equilibrium at the minimum gravitational potential energy.

== In popular culture ==
- Dynamogene Theater stages a performance called "Monsieur Culbuto", allowing the audience to interact with a human dressed as a roly-poly toy.
- The Noddy stories by Enid Blyton feature the character Mr. Wobblyman, who is based on this type of toy.
- One of the puppets/non-human presenters in the TV show Playbus (later Playdays) was a roly-poly clown called Wobble.
- Characters from Comedy Central's animated sitcom Fairview are depicted as an anthropomorphic roly-poly doll that features no hands, legs, or feet; the bottom of each figure is instead a rounded ball.
- Dr. Loveless is associated with bobo dolls decorated as menacing clowns in some scenes of The Wild Wild West.

== See also ==
- Bobo doll experiment
- Gömböc
- Monostatic polytope
