= Shorinzan Daruma Temple =

Buddhist temple in Honshu, Japan

Coordinates: 36.3303°N 138.9569°E

Shorinzan Daruma Temple (少林山達磨寺, shōrinzan daruma-ji) is a small temple located in Takasaki, Gunma Prefecture. It was built in 1697 by the Obaku school of Zen Buddhism. Takasaki is known as the birthplace of daruma, as it is believed that the dolls originated from the region many years ago. The daruma of Shorinzan are said to be especially lucky, leading the city's PR department to dub Takasaki as The Lucky Town.

== Origin ==
An old legend states that sometime between 1673 and 1681, a heavy rain came and flooded the Usui River. Afterwards, villagers found a glowing, scented tree near the riverbed. They decided it was sacred and placed it inside an old hut that housed the local Kannon statue. As they did, purple haze began swirling around them.

Around the time of the flood, Bodhidharma Daishi appeared before a traveling monk named Ichiryo Koji in a dream. Allegedly he commanded Ichiryo Koji to carve his likeness out of a tree that was exactly the height of his nose. In 1680 Ichiryo Koji began his search for that tree, finally finding it when he visited the village that had once flooded. Ichiryo Koji carved the Bodhidharma Daishi's likeness with great devotion and care; it was officially placed next to the Kannon statue, both enshrined together.

Ichiryo Koji's devotion inspired the local villagers, and after that the area became known as "Shorinzan", the sacred place where the Daruma appeared. The ruling lord of the time then had Shorinzan Daruma Temple founded in 1697 in order to protect his castle (historically, Maebashi Castle, but at that time known by another name).

== History ==
Originally Shorinzan was founded as a temple for the Soto school of Zen Buddhism, but in the Meiji era it was converted to the Obaku sect.

From 1783 to 1787, the 9th generation Zen Master of the temple aided suffering locals during the Great Tenmei famine. He taught them how to make papier-mâché dolls based on daruma dolls. This began what is now known as the Shorinzan Nanakusa Taisai Daruma Market Festival. It is held annually on January 6 and 7. In recent years it has attracted thousands of visitors each year who come to buy new daruma dolls and have their old ones burned.

On June 14, 1881 Shorinzan burned down in a fire, losing important historical documents such as the details of its construction. There used to be a bell that was donated during World War II that was said to have an inscription inside dating it to 1712.

In 1934 German architect Bruno Taut fled from Nazi Germany with his wife. He was invited to Japan and eventually to Takasaki. There was a small empty building available on the outskirts of Shorinzan where they lived for the two years they spent in Takasaki. At his farewell party held on October 10, 1936, Taut expressed his desire to have his bones buried at the temple after his death.

While still working as an assistant director, Akira Kurosawa wrote a script called A German at Daruma Temple that used Shorinzan as the setting. It was written sometime between the 1930s to 1940s but was never filmed.

In 1947, Jomo Karuta was created; it features Shorinzan as the 'e' card.

== Cultural properties ==
Shorinzan is connected with two designated cultural properties.

On the prefectural level, Senshin-tei (洗心亭). It was built in Taisho era and the size of 6x4 tatami mats. This is the building where Bruno Taut lived during his stay in Takasaki.

On the municipal level, the Daruma Daishi (Bodhidharma) statue (達磨大師立像).
