= Syamadas Mukhopadhyaya =

Indian mathematician (1866–1937)

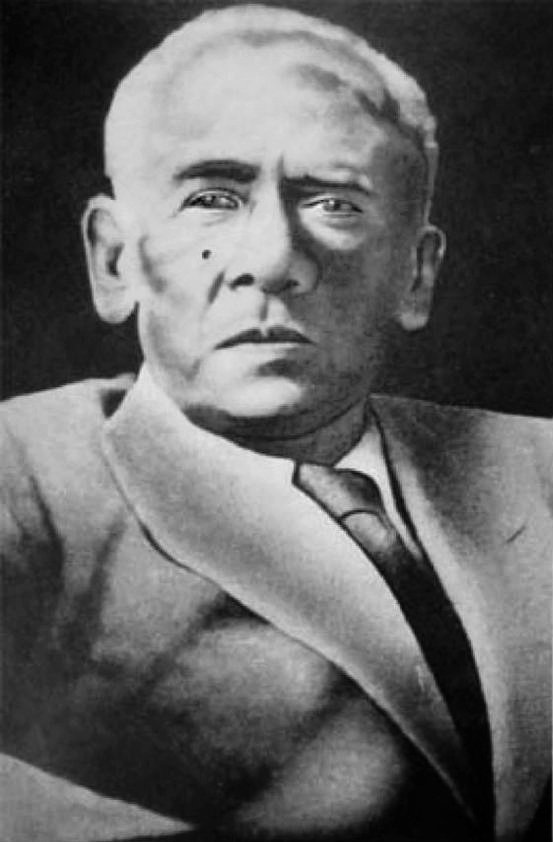
- Syamadas Mukhopadhyaya
- Born: June 22, 1866; Horipal block, Hooghly district, Bengal Presidency
- Died: June 8, 1937 (aged 70); Kolkata
- Education: Calcutta University
- Known for: Mukhopadhyaya's theorem, Four-vertex theorem, Non-Euclidean geometry, Differential geometry
- Awards: Griffith prize
- Scientific career
- Fields: mathematics
- Workplaces: Rajabazar Science College; Calcutta University; Presidency University
- Thesis: Parametric Coefficients in the Differential Geometry of Curves in an N-space (1910)

Syamadas Mukhopadhyaya (22 June 1866 – 8 May 1937) was an Indian mathematician who introduced the four-vertex theorem and Mukhopadhyaya's theorem in plane geometry.

== Biography ==
Syamadas Mukhopadhyaya was born at Haripal, Hooghly district, in Bengal Presidency, British India. He graduated from Hooghly College, received his M.A. degree from Presidency College in Calcutta, and his Ph.D. degree from Calcutta University in 1910. He also took classes from the Indian Association for the Cultivation of Science.

Mukhopadhyaya was appointed by Asutosh Mookerjee as professor of mathematics in the Rajabazar Science College, University of Calcutta. Jacques Hadamard communicated with Mukhopadyaya about the latter's work on the geometry of a plane arc and Wilhelm Blaschke's book on geometry had a reference to Mukhopadhyaya.

He worked at Bangabasi College and then at Bethune College in Calcutta, where he lectured in Mathematics, English Literature, and Philosophy. In 1932, he was elected president of the Calcutta Mathematical Society. He served in this capacity until his death from heart failure in 1937. Mukhopadhyaya went to Europe on a Ghose Travelling Fellowship in 1933 to study methods of education. He gave lectures in Paris University.
