= Four vertex theorem =

On points of extreme curvature in curves

Application of the Four-vertex theorem to an ellipse

In geometry, the four vertex theorem states that the curvature along a simple, closed, smooth plane curve has at least four local extrema (specifically, at least two local maxima and at least two local minima). The name of the theorem derives from the convention of calling an extreme point of the curvature function a vertex. This theorem has many generalizations, including a version for space curves where a vertex is defined as a point of vanishing torsion.

== Definition and examples ==
An ellipse (red) and its evolute (blue), showing the four vertices of the curve, each vertex corresponding to a cusp on the evolute.

The curvature at any point of a smooth curve in the plane can be defined as the reciprocal of the radius of an osculating circle at that point, or as the norm of the second derivative of a parametric representation of the curve, parameterized consistently with the length along the curve. For the vertices of a curve to be well-defined, the curvature itself should vary continuously, as happens for curves of smoothness $C^2$. A vertex is then a local maximum or local minimum of curvature. If the curvature is constant over an arc of the curve, all points of that arc are considered to be vertices. The four-vertex theorem states that a smooth closed curve always has at least four vertices.

An ellipse has exactly four vertices: two local maxima of curvature where it is crossed by the major axis of the ellipse, and two local minima of curvature where it is crossed by the minor axis. In a circle, every point is both a local maximum and a local minimum of curvature, so there are infinitely many vertices. If a smooth closed curve crosses a circle $k$ times, then it has at least $k$ vertices, so a curve with exactly four vertices such as an ellipse can cross any circle at most four times.

Every curve of constant width has at least six vertices. Although many curves of constant width, such as the Reuleaux triangle, are non-smooth or have circular arcs on their boundaries, there exist smooth curves of constant width that have exactly six vertices.

The vertices of a smooth curve correspond to the cusps of its evolute, the curve formed by the centers of curvature of the given curve. Thus, the evolute of any smooth closed curve has at least four cusps.

== History ==
The four-vertex theorem was first proved for convex curves (i.e. curves with strictly positive curvature) in 1909 by Syamadas Mukhopadhyaya. His proof utilizes the fact that a point on the curve is an extremum of the curvature function if and only if the osculating circle at that point has fourth-order contact with the curve; in general the osculating circle has only third-order contact with the curve. The four-vertex theorem was proved for more general curves by Adolf Kneser in 1912 using a projective argument.

== Proof ==
For many years the proof of the four-vertex theorem remained difficult, but a simple and conceptual proof was given by Osserman (1985), based on the idea of the minimum enclosing circle. This is a circle that contains the given curve and has the smallest possible radius. If the curve includes an arc of the circle, it has infinitely many vertices. Otherwise, the curve and circle must have at least two tangent points, because a circle that touched the curve at fewer points could be reduced in size while still enclosing it. At each tangency, the curvature of the curve is greater than that of the circle, for otherwise the curve would continue from the tangency outside the circle rather than inside. However, between each pair of tangencies, the curvature must decrease to less than that of the circle, for instance at a point obtained by translating the circle until it no longer contains any part of the curve between the two points of tangency and considering the last point of contact between the translated circle and the curve. Therefore, there is a local minimum of curvature between each pair of tangencies, giving two of the four vertices. There must be a local maximum of curvature between each pair of local minima (not necessarily at the points of tangency), giving the other two vertices.

== Converse ==
The converse to the four-vertex theorem states that any continuous, real-valued function of the circle that has at least two local maxima and two local minima is the curvature function of a simple, closed plane curve. The converse was proved for strictly positive functions in 1971 by Herman Gluck as a special case of a general theorem on pre-assigning the curvature of n-spheres. The full converse to the four-vertex theorem was proved by Björn Dahlberg shortly before his death in January 1998, and published posthumously. Dahlberg's proof uses a winding number argument which is in some ways reminiscent of the standard topological proof of the Fundamental Theorem of Algebra.

== Application to mechanics ==
One corollary of the theorem is that a homogeneous, planar disk rolling on a horizontal surface under gravity has at least 4 balance points. A discrete version of this is that there cannot be a monostatic polygon. However, in three dimensions there do exist monostatic polyhedra, and there also exists a convex, homogeneous object with exactly 2 balance points (one stable, and the other unstable), the Gömböc.

== Discrete variations ==
There are several discrete versions of the four-vertex theorem, both for convex and non-convex polygons. In this context, it is important to distinguish the notion of a vertex of a polygon (the shared endpoint of two sides) from a vertex of a smooth curve.

A polygon is said to be generic if no four vertices are cocircular, and coherent if, for each pair of consecutive edges, the circumcenter of their three vertices lies within the wedge formed by the two edges. Equivalently, in a coherent polygon, the triangle formed by these three vertices is not allowed to be obtuse with one of the two edges as its longest side. For a coherent convex polygon with at least four vertices, the cyclic sequence of circumradii of consecutive triples of vertices has at least two local maxima and two local minima. The middle vertex at a local extreme is called an extremal vertex. The circumcircle of it and its two neighbors either contains both vertices two steps away from the central vertex, or neither. Thus, every generic coherent convex polygon has at least four extremal vertices, and this remains true without the assumption of coherence. It is not necessarily the case that the angles at the vertices of a convex polygon have four local extremes. But for a generic convex equilateral polygon, one whose side lengths are all equal, there are again at least two local minima and at least two local maxima in the angles.

Instead of circumcircles for triples of consecutive vertices of a polygon, one can consider inscribed circles for triples of consecutive edges, for which analogous results hold. For instance, for a generic equiangular polygon, a convex polygon whose angles are all equal, there are at least two local minima and at least two local maxima in the edge lengths.

== In three dimensions ==
The stereographic projection from the once-punctured sphere to the plane preserves critical points of geodesic curvature. Thus simple closed spherical curves have four vertices. Furthermore, on the sphere vertices of a curve correspond to points where its torsion vanishes. More generally, for space curves a vertex is defined as a point of vanishing torsion. V. D. Sedykh showed that any simple closed space curve which lies on the boundary of a convex body has four vertices. Mohammad Ghomi generalized this result to all curves which bound a locally convex disk.

== See also ==
- Last geometric statement of Jacobi
- Tennis ball theorem
