= Okiagari-koboshi =

Japanese traditional doll

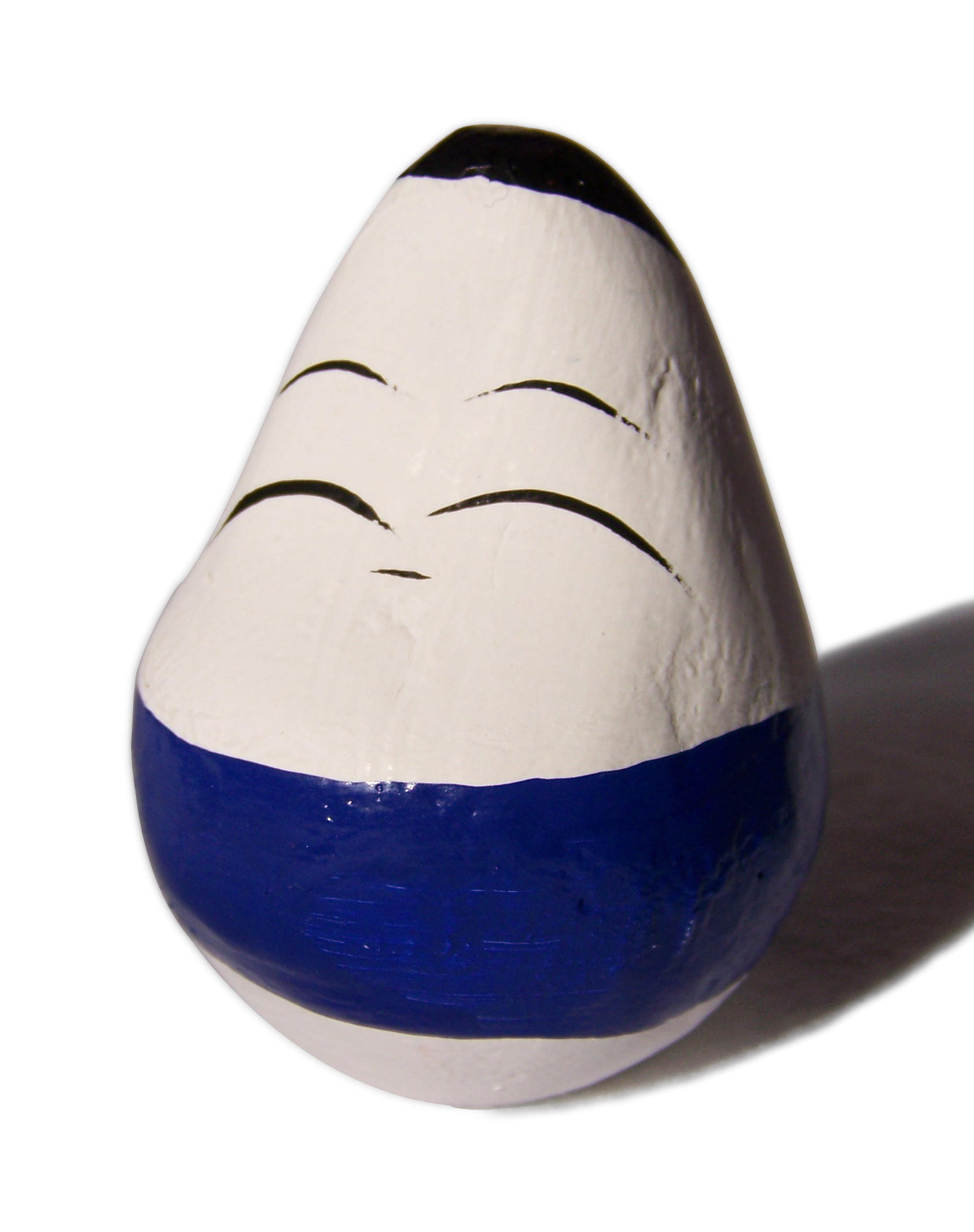
Okiagari-kobōshi from Aizuwakamatsu, Fukushima

Okiagari-koboshi or Okiagari-kobōshi (起き上がり小法師, getting-up little boy) is a Japanese traditional doll. The toy is made from papier-mâché and is a roly-poly toy, designed so that its weight causes it to return to an upright position if it is knocked over. Okiagari-kobōshi is considered a good-luck charm and a symbol of perseverance and resilience (including for Daruma versions).

== History ==
The makers of the earliest okiagari-kobōshi likely modeled them after a Chinese toy called Budaoweng (不倒翁; not-falling-down old man) that is similarly weighted. Okiagari-kobōshi has long been popular among Japanese children. It is mentioned in a 14th-century play called Manju-Kui, and folklorist Lafcadio Hearn recorded a lullaby from Matsue in Izumo Province in the early 20th century that lists the doll as a gift for a young child:

Nenneko, nenneko nenneko ya!

Kono ko nashite naku-yara?
O-chichi ga taranuka? — o-mama ga taranuka?
Ima ni ototsan no ōtoto no o-kaeri ni
Ame ya, o-kwashi ya, hii-hii ya,
Gara-gara, nagureba fuito tatsu
Okiagarikoboshi! —

Neneko, neneko, nenneko ya!

Translated, it says:

Sleep, sleep, sleep, little one!

Why does the child continue to cry?
Is the milk deficient? — is the rice deficient?
Presently when father returns from the great Lord's palace,
Ame will be given to you, and also cake, and a hii-hii likewise,
And a rattle as well, and an okiagarikoboshi

That will stand up immediately after being thrown down.

Okiagari-koboshi are popular in the Aizu region of Fukushima Prefecture. There, the dolls are sold in red and blue varieties. People buy the dolls during the Tokaichi (Tenth-day Market) held each 10 January. Shoppers typically throw several okiagari-koboshi down at the same time; those that stand back up are supposedly the lucky ones. Tradition mandates the purchase of one okiagari-koboshi for each member of the family plus one extra in the hope that the family will grow over the coming year.

== Daruma dolls ==
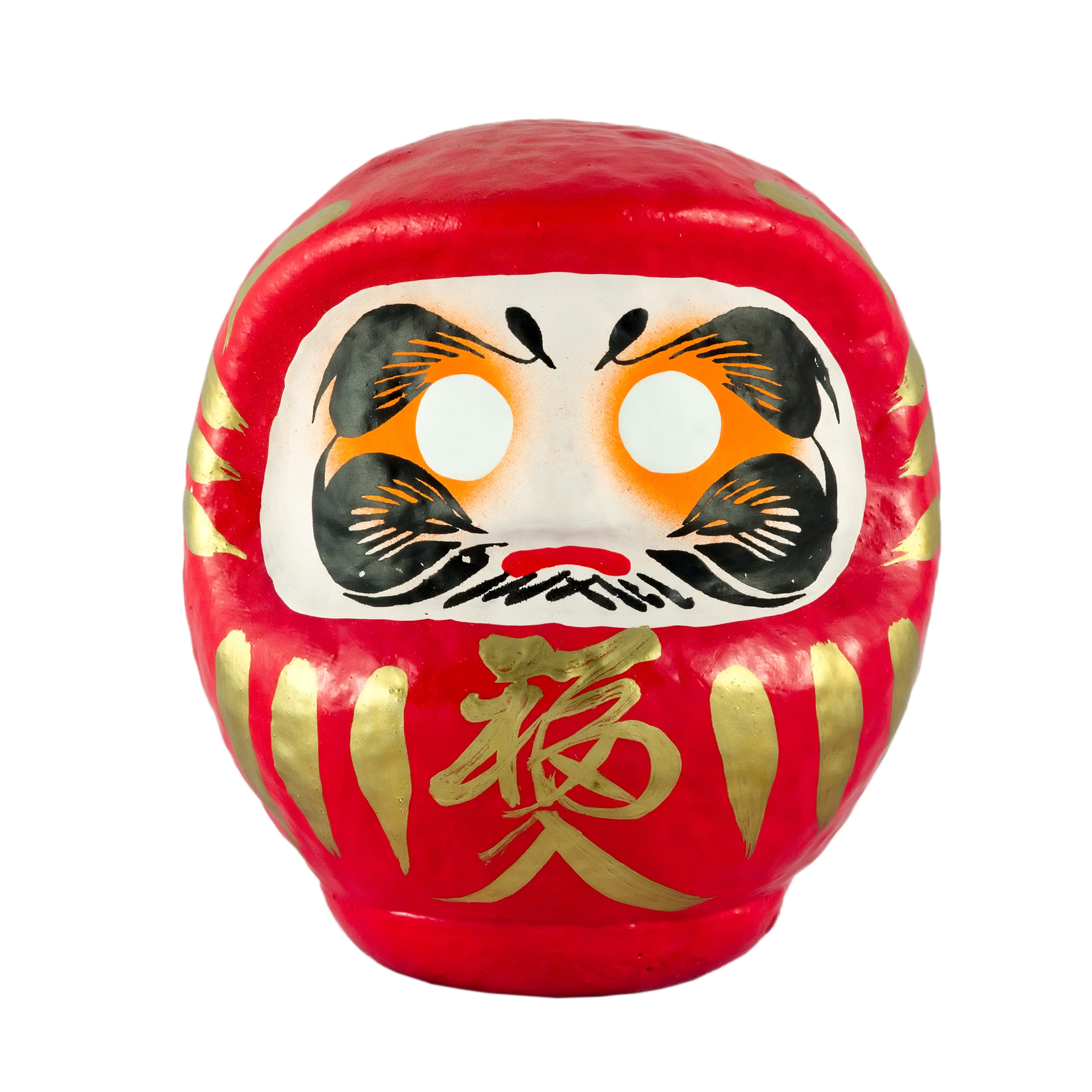
Daruma doll of the okiagari-kobōshi type

One kind of Daruma doll works on the same principle as okiagari-kobōshi and is sometimes referred to by that name; whenever it is thrown down, it rights itself. This depiction of the Buddhist monk Bodhidharma likely arose in connection with a legend that says that he once meditated for nine years, which caused his legs to either atrophy or fall off. A 17th-century children's song shows that the okiagari-kobōshi Daruma dolls of the time were almost identical to their modern equivalents:

ひに！ ふに！Hi ni! fu ni!

ふんだん達磨が Fundan Daruma ga
赤い頭巾かぶりすんまいた! Akai zukin kaburi sunmaita!

Once! twice!
Ever the red-hooded Daruma
Heedlessly sits up again!

Paper mache Daruma dolls without eyes are bought by those who have a goal in mind. The left eye is drawn in at the beginning of the quest, the right upon achieving it. For example, those hoping for recovery from an illness, or others wishing for their recovery would buy one for that purpose.

== See also ==
- Daruma doll
- Japanese craft
- Japanese dolls
- Meibutsu
- Roly-poly toy
