= Daruma doll =

Traditional Japanese doll

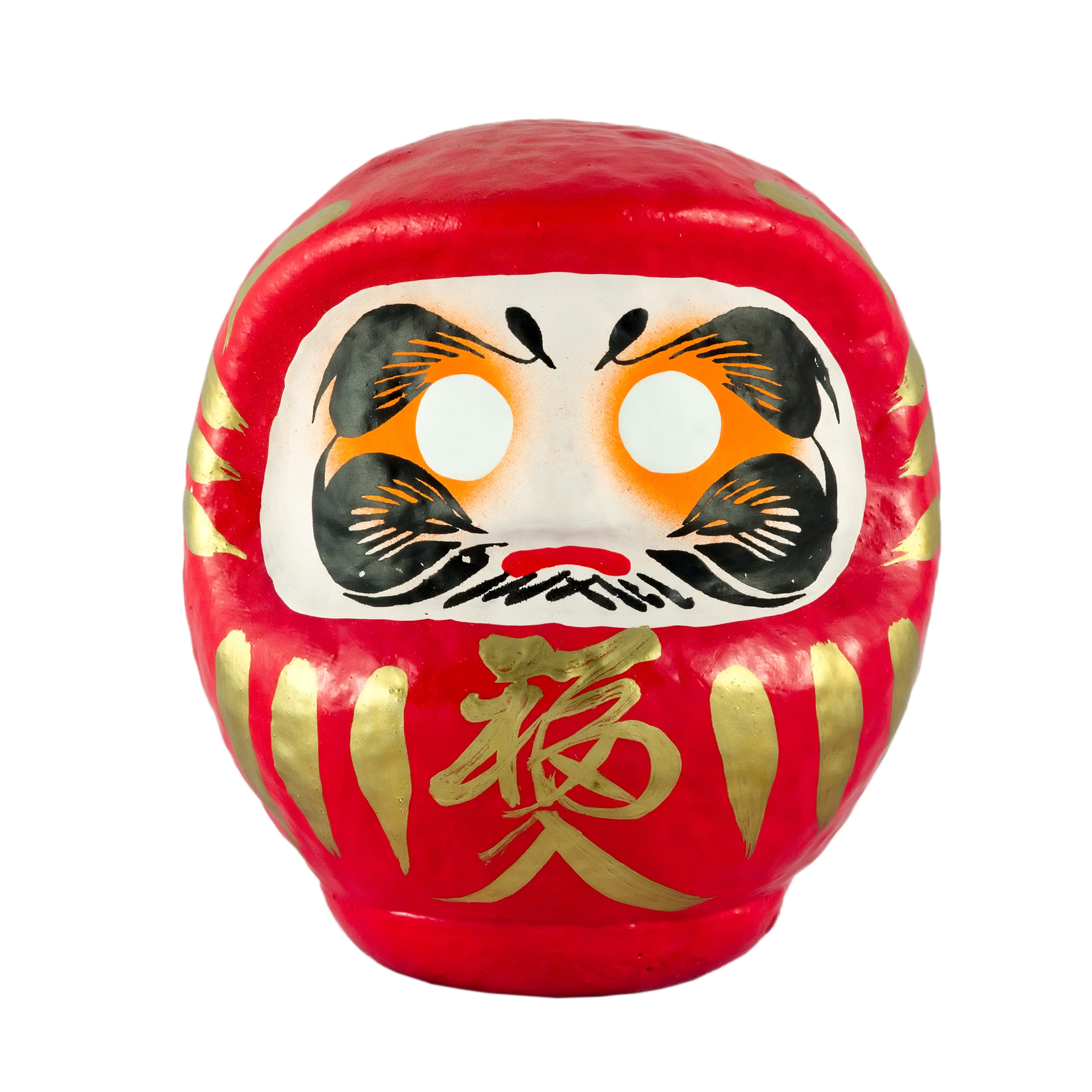
Daruma doll

A Daruma doll (Japanese: 達磨, romanized: daruma; IPA: [da̠ɾɯ̟ma̠]) is a hollow, round, Japanese traditional doll modeled after Bodhidharma, the founder of the Zen tradition of Buddhism. These dolls, though typically red and depicting the Indian monk, Bodhidharma, vary greatly in color and design depending on region and artist. Though considered a toy by some, Daruma has a design that is rich in symbolism and is regarded more as a talisman of good luck to the Japanese. Daruma dolls are seen as a symbol of perseverance and good luck, making them a popular gift of encouragement. The doll has also been commercialized by many Buddhist temples to use alongside the setting of goals.

== Use ==
When purchased, the figure's eyes are both blank white. The owner selects a goal or wish and paints in the left eye of the figure's two eyes with Chinese or Japanese ink. Once the goal is achieved, the right eye is filled in.

== Bodhidharma ==
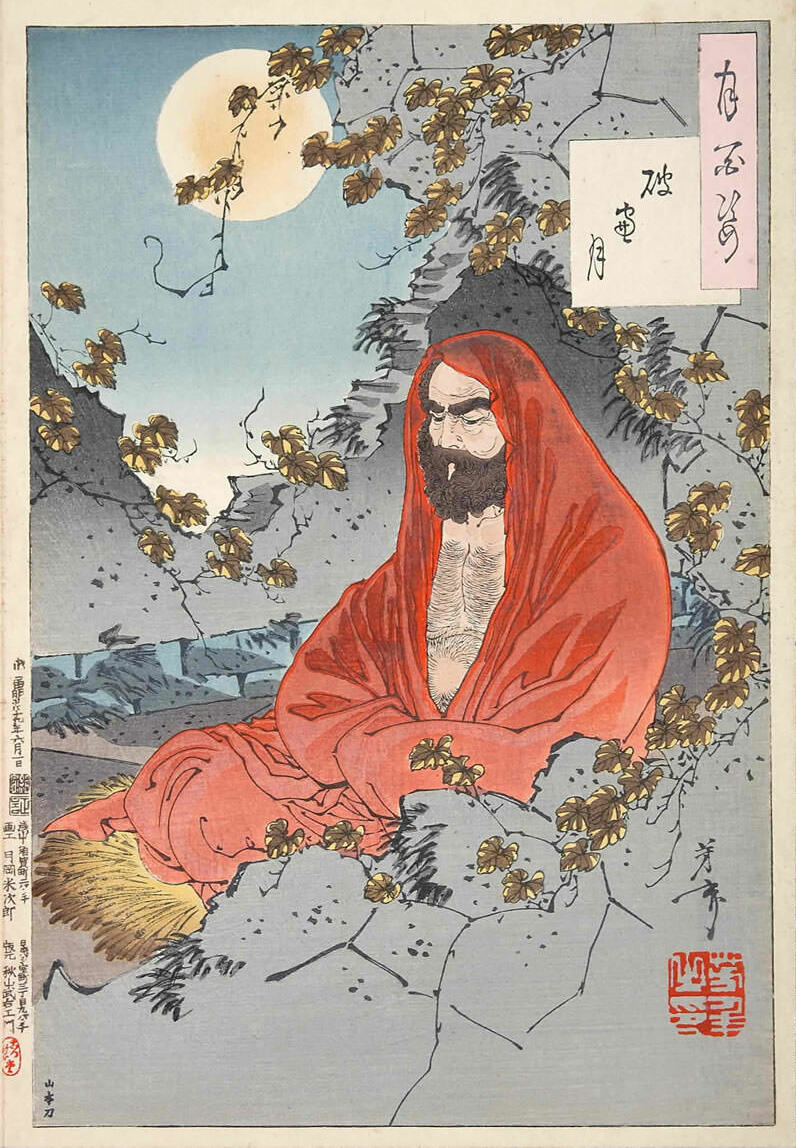
Bodhidharma, woodblock print by Yoshitoshi, 1887

Bodhidharma was a Buddhist monk who lived during the 5th/6th century CE. He is traditionally credited as the transmitter of Ch'an (Zen) to China. Little contemporary biographical information on Bodhidharma is available, and subsequent accounts have become layered with legend. According to one tradition, Bodhidharma gained a reputation for, among other things, his practice of wall-gazing. Legend claims that he sat facing a wall in meditation for a period of nine years without moving, which caused his legs and arms to fall off from atrophy. Another popular legend is that after falling asleep during his nine-year meditation he became angry with himself and cut off his eyelids to avoid ever falling asleep again.

According to the principal Chinese sources, Bodhidharma came from the Western Regions, which refers to Central Asia but may also include the Indian subcontinent, and was either a "Persian Central Asian" or a "South Indian ... the third son of a great Indian king." Throughout Buddhist art, Bodhidharma is depicted as an ill-tempered, bearded, wide-eyed non-Chinese person. He is referred as "The Blue-Eyed Barbarian" (Chinese: 碧眼胡; pinyin: Bìyǎnhú) in Chan texts, although note that while the translation "barbarian" is derogatory, in Chinese it is simply descriptive of non-Chinese origin.

== History and commercialization ==
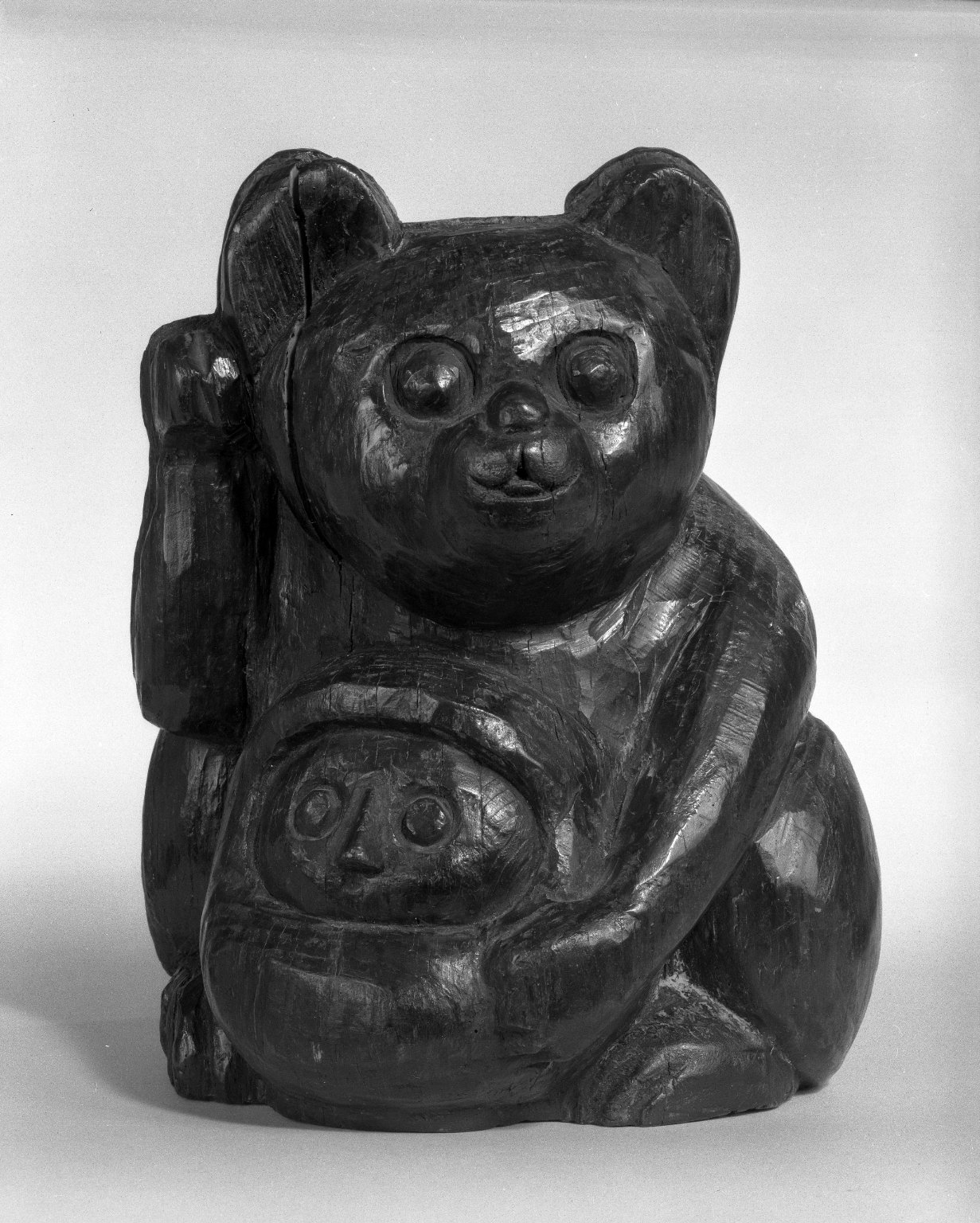
A wooden mold for a papier-mâché Maneki-neko and Okiagari-Koboshi Daruma figure from the Edo Period, 18th century. Brooklyn Museum.

The current popular symbolism associated with Daruma as a good luck charm in part originated at Shorinzan Daruma Temple, in the city of Takasaki (Gunma Prefecture, north of Tokyo). Josef Kyburz, author of "Omocha": Things to Play (Or Not to Play) with, explained that the founder of Daruma-Dera would draw New Year's charms depicting Bodhidharma. The parishioners would keep these charms to "bring happiness and prosperity and ward off accidents and misfortune".

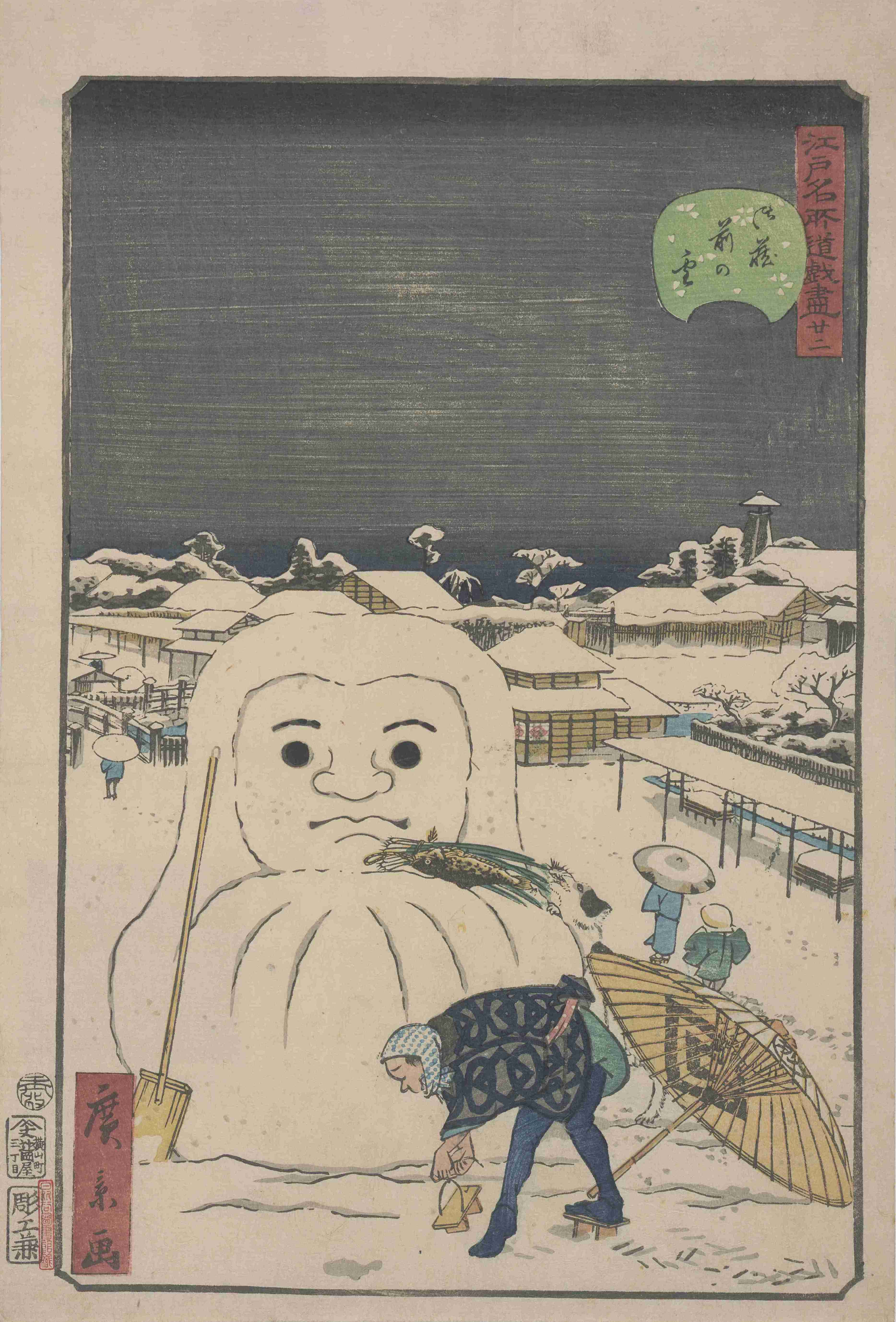
No. 22, Snow in Front of the Official Storehouses by Hirokage

It is believed that the Daruma figurine then originated from this region when the ninth priest, Togaku, found a solution to handle the constant requests of the parishioners for new charms. The charms were always given with an effectiveness of one year, so the people required new ones every year. He solved this by entrusting them with the making of their own Daruma charms near the beginning of the Meiwa period (1764–72). The temple made wooden block molds for the people to use. The peasants then used these molds to make three-dimensional papier-mâché charms.

Kyburz notes that though it is unknown when the Daruma figurine combined with the tumbler doll; the two were well recognized as synonymous by the mid-19th century. The doll quickly grew in popularity, becoming a mascot of the region. This was due greatly in part to fact that the majority of the families were silk farmers, a crop which requires a great deal of luck for success.

There is an annual Daruma Doll Festival (達磨市, daruma-ichi) held by the city of Takasaki in celebration of being the proclaimed birthplace of the Daruma doll. The celebration is held at the Shorinzan, the name of Takasaki's "Daruma-Dera". According to the Takasaki city website, "Over 400,000 people from all over the Kanto Plain come to buy new good-luck dolls for the year. Takasaki produces 80% of Japan's Daruma dolls." The festival also features a 24-hour reading of sutras by the Shorinzan monks for world peace.

== Physical features and symbolism ==
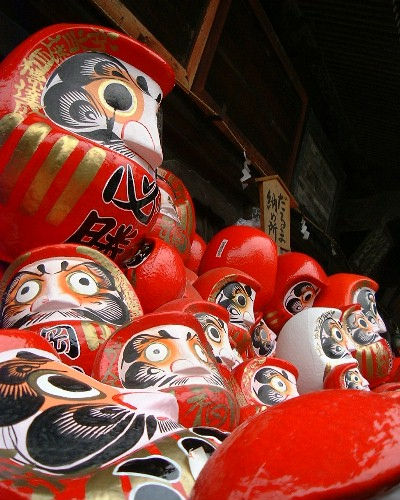
Daruma dolls at Shōrinzan Daruma-ji, Takasaki, Japan

Daruma's design, particularly the shape, color, eyes and facial hair, each have its own history and symbolic meaning.

=== Shape ===
Darumas are still usually made of papier-mâché, have a round shape, are hollow and weighted at the bottom so that they will always return to an upright position when tilted over. In Japanese, a roly-poly toy is called okiagari, meaning to get up (oki) and arise (agari). This characteristic has come to symbolize the ability to have success, overcome adversity, and recover from misfortune. In Japanese popular culture on cards, banners and books, Daruma is often illustrated alongside the phrase "fall over seven times, get up eight" (七転び八起き, nanakorobi yaoki). While some traditional Daruma dolls have flat bases, the "triangle" Daruma (三角だるま, sankaku Daruma) is constructed from a rolled cardboard cone attached to a rounded clay base so that it always stands straight when tilted. Bodhidharma is said to have meditated for nine years at Shaolin Temple facing a wall until his legs atrophied from lack of use, which was the inspiration for its limbless form.

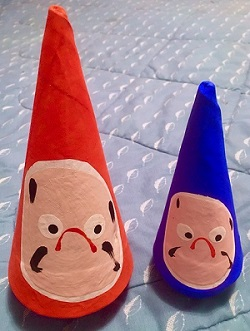
Triangle Darumas made by Tokushiro Imai (1895–1995), who developed their design in 1956.

The tumbler doll style is similar to an earlier toy called the okiagari-kobōshi, a little self-righting monk which was popular in the Kinki region during the mid-17th century. The original okiagari toy, however, is said to have been introduced from Ming China.

=== Color ===
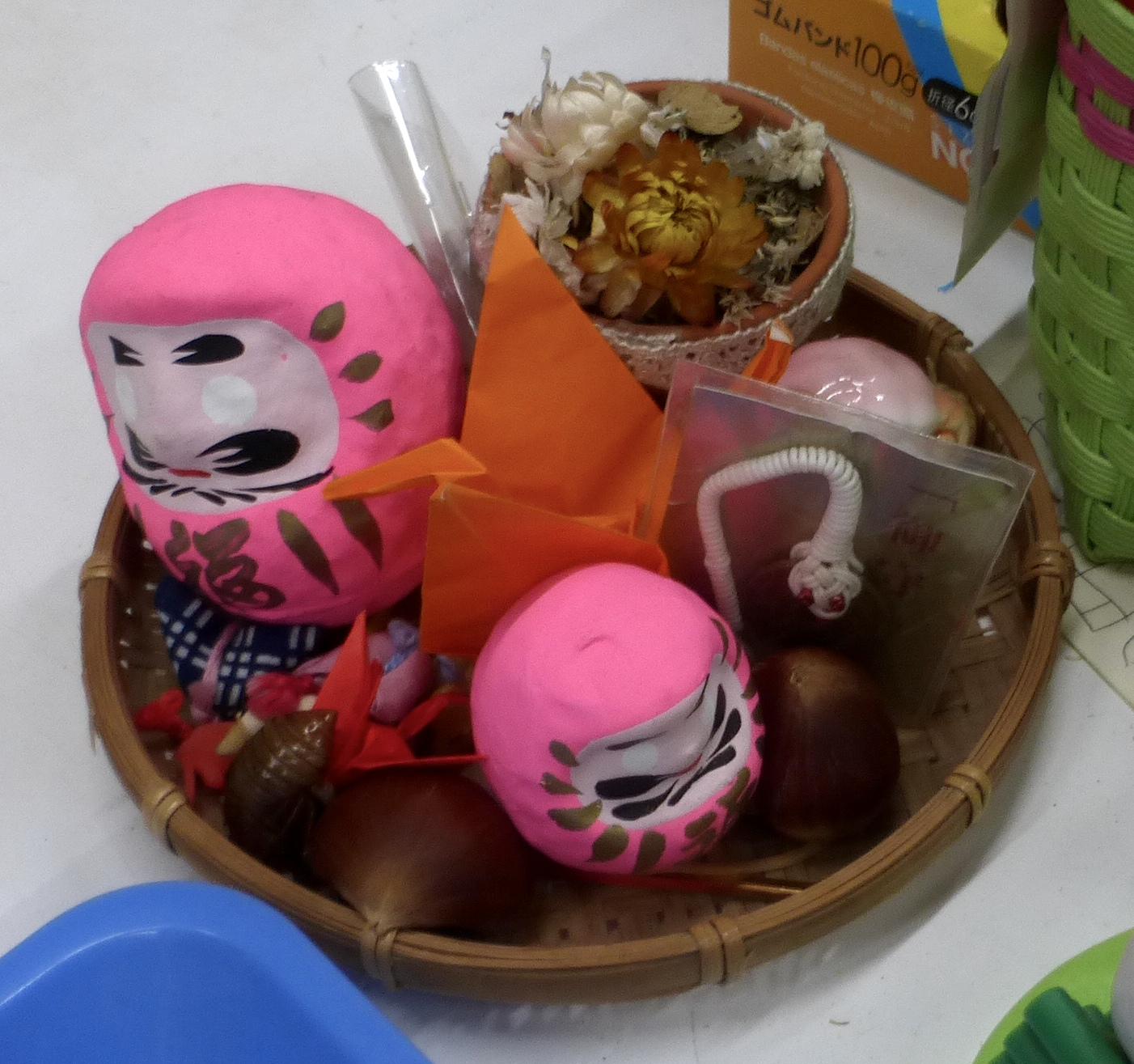
Non-traditional neon pink Daruma dolls in Ibaraki.

Though it is not certain, the origins of Daruma's traditional red coloring probably came from the color of priests' robes. Reliable sources in English are hard to find, but one Japan-based website cites this red as being the "color of the robe of a high-ranking priest. The author then concludes that "since Daruma was the founder of the Zen Sect, he must have worn a red robe." The art historian James T. Ulak has documented a history of depictions of the Bodhidharma wearing lavish red robes, prior to representations of him as a doll.

By virtue of his red robes, Daruma has come to play a role in recovering from sickness. During the late Edo period (1603–1868), red was believed to have a strong association to smallpox. In Edo and surrounding cities, there were many outbreaks of measles and smallpox. In present-day Japan, there are many red shrines dedicated to a God of Smallpox, which had a particular liking for red. These shrines were built in response to those outbreaks. Believing that the God of smallpox, if pleased, would spare the afflicted child, the Japanese would often stretch out ropes around the house strung with red paper strips, have the child wear a red robe, and make a small altar for the God to put talisman-like Daruma figurines on. These precautions were also used to warn others that sickness was in the house, and to encourage cleanliness around the sick. The red of Daruma, however, was used to pacify the God, while the image of okiagari was to encourage the patient to recover as quickly as they fell ill. Daruma are also sold as a set of five colors – blue, yellow, red, white and black – called Goshiki Daruma. These days, daruma can also be found in colors other than red, including gold, which is meant to bring luck in financial matters.

=== Eyes ===
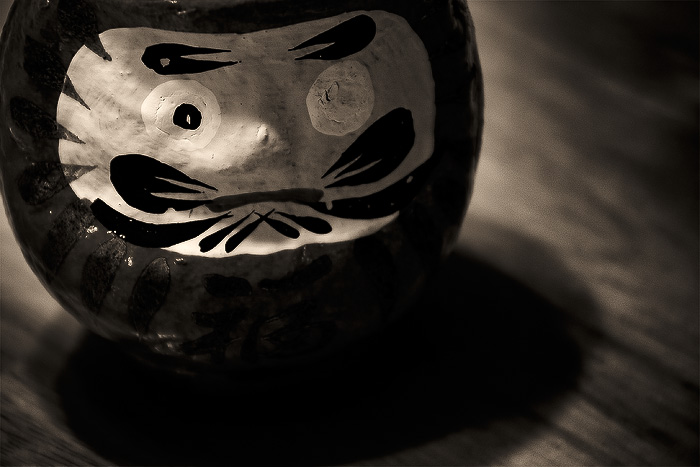
A daruma doll with one eye filled in for wishing

The eyes of Daruma are often blank when sold. The "oversized symmetrical round blank white eyes" are described as a means to keep track of goals or big tasks and motivate them to work to the finish. The recipient of the doll fills in one eye upon setting the goal, then the other upon fulfilling it. In this way, every time they see the one-eyed Daruma, they recall the goal. One explanation how this custom started says that in order to motivate Daruma-san to grant your wish, you promise to give him full sight once the goal is accomplished. This practice might also have something to do with the "enlightenment", the ideal attainment of Buddhism. This custom has led to a phrase in Japanese translated as "Both Eyes Open". Referring to "opening" the second eye, it expresses the realization of a goal. Traditionally, the Daruma was purchased as a household item, and only the head of the household would paint in the eyes.

One example of this tradition in practice is intentions set by politicians during election time. Political parties have often been shown at their headquarters with large Daruma dolls and amulets purchased from local temples as a prayer for victory. This practice was highlighted in a 1967 article in Time magazine: "Last week, in the Tokyo headquarters of Japan's ruling Liberal Democratic Party, Premier Eisaku Satō dipped a sumi brush into an ink stone and with swift strokes daubed in the dark right eye of his Daruma. 'The eyes,' he remarked when he had finished, 'are as big as my own.'"

The Matsukawa Daruma (松川だるま) is produced with the eyes already painted, with the purpose of watching over a family's household. These intricate figures are more slender than traditional Daruma and typically feature blue coloring and a base molded (or simply painted) in the form of the ship that transports the Seven Lucky Gods.

=== Facial hair ===
Daruma's facial hair is a symbolic representation of the animals well known in Asian culture to embody longevity: the crane and the tortoise. The eyebrows are in the shape of a crane, while the cheek hair resembles the shell of the tortoise. Originally there was a snake or dragon depicted across the moustache and cheeks, but this was changed to a tortoise to emphasize the desire for longevity. In this way, Daruma was designed to match the Japanese proverb "The crane lives 1000 years, the tortoise 10,000 years".

== Daruma burning ==
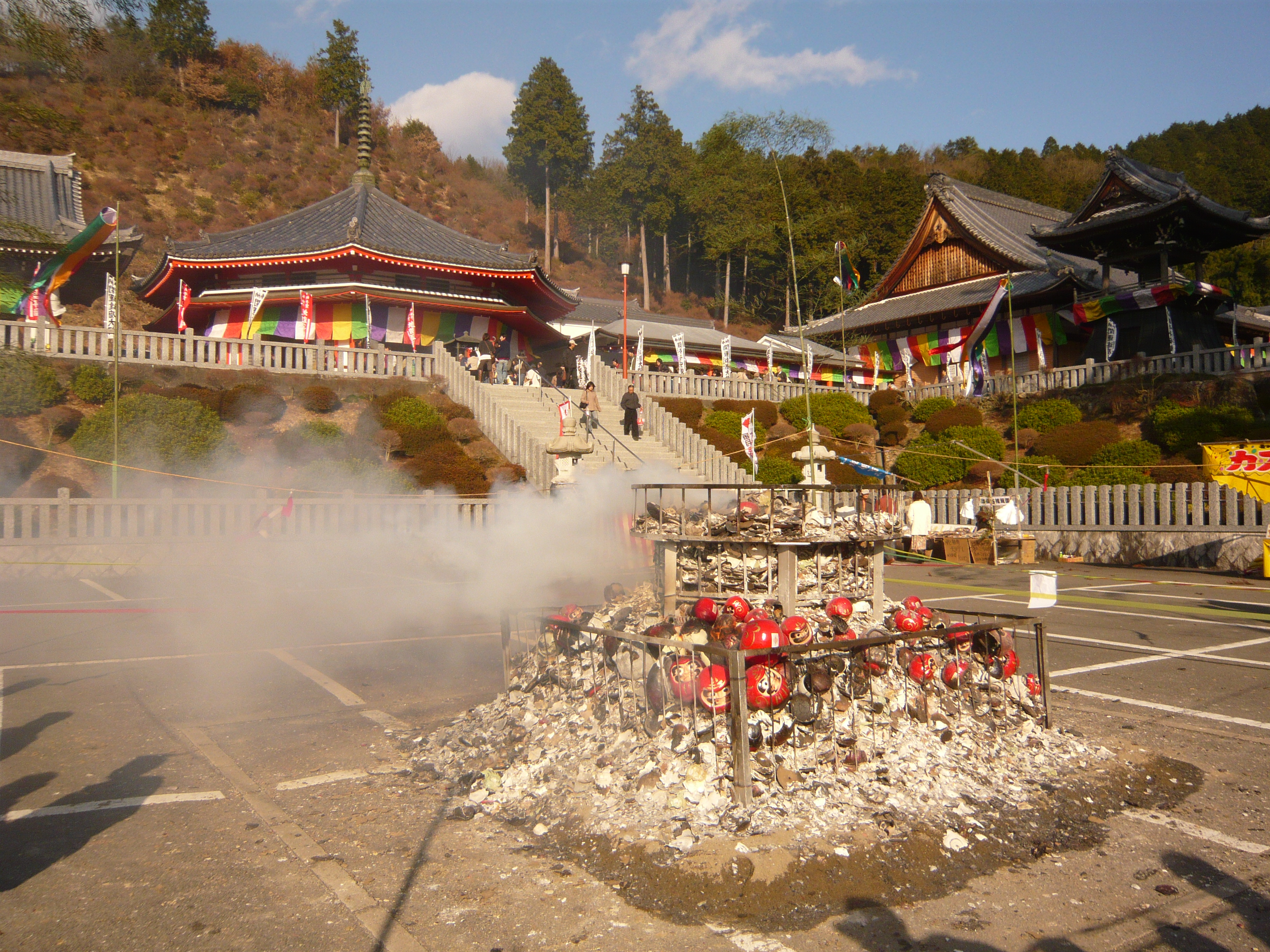
Burning of the Daruma

At the end of the year, all the Daruma are brought back to the temple they were purchased from for a traditional burning ceremony. This ceremony, called the daruma kuyō (だるま供養), is held once a year, usually right after New Year's Day. The most renowned of these events are held at the Nishi-Arai Daishi Temple in Tokyo and the Dairyū-ji Temple in Gifu. At these events, people bring the Daruma figures they had used that year to the temple. After expressing gratitude to them, they turn them over to the temple and buy new ones for the next year. All of the old Daruma figures are burnt together in the temple. After a solemn display of the monks' entry, reading of the sutras and blowing of horns, the tens of thousands of figurines are then set aflame.

== Feminine representations ==
Daruma dolls also come in the form of Princess Daruma (姫だるま, hime daruma) and Lady Daruma (女だるま, onna daruma). This contrasts greatly with traditional representations of Bodhidharma, who, accredited as the father of many martial arts, has traditionally been depicted as very masculine with rough facial hair. The origins of feminine Daruma began in response to social changes during the Edo Period. Contemporaneous class distinctions placed the merchants at the bottom, who in turn developed their own culture focusing on humor and poking fun at what those of higher class held sacred. This is evident in the depiction of Bodhidharma as a prostitute since prostitutes displayed the same "okiagari" resilience. Famous pieces of art depicting Bodhidharma were also redrawn with a woman in his place.

With the inception of the Daruma doll, the Onna Daruma doll quickly followed. Though the aforementioned examples of feminine motifs of Bodhidharma were satirical, the doll forms maintain the same wholesome image of a bringer of good luck.

== Children's games ==
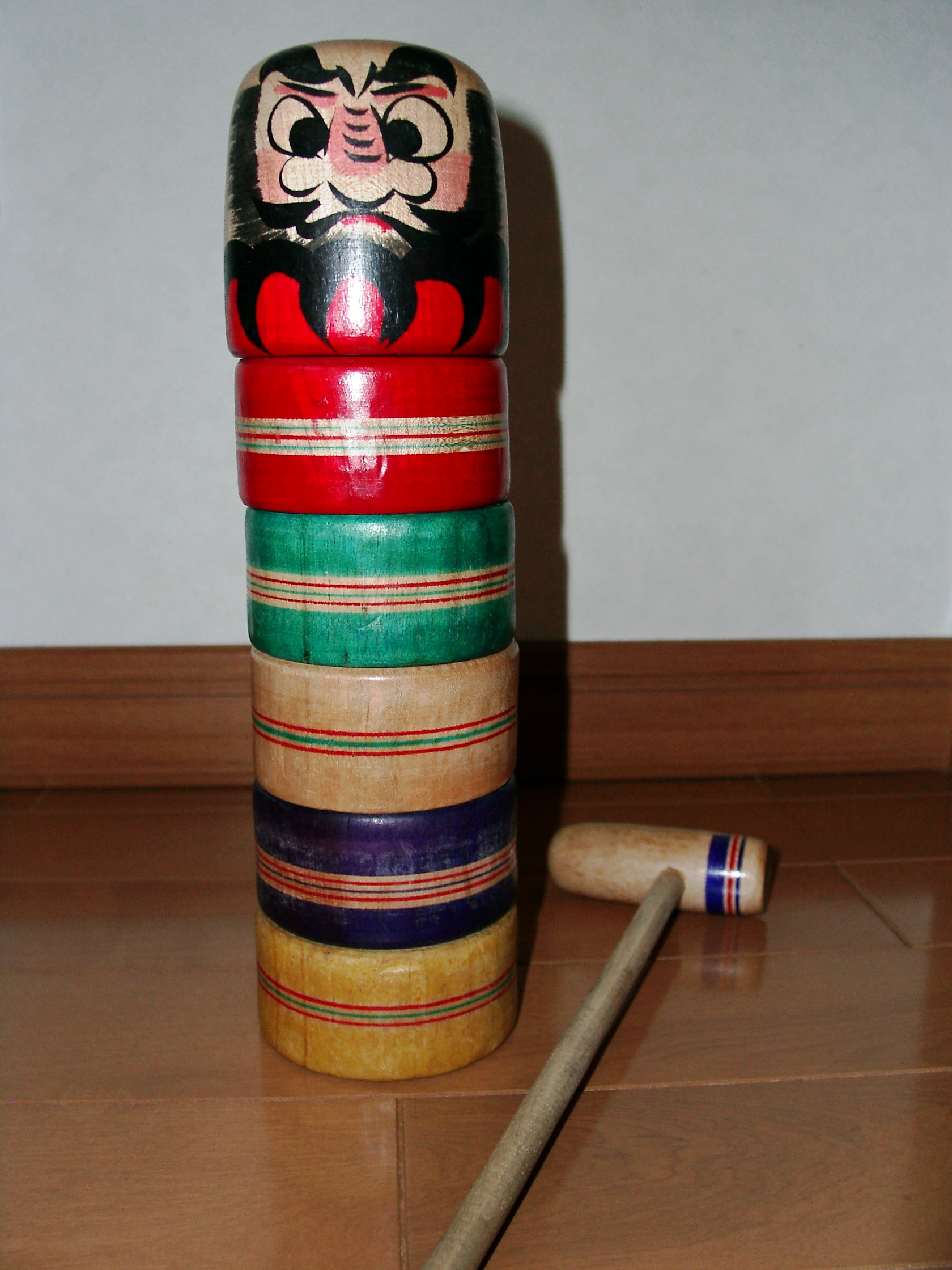
Daruma Otoshi. The Daruma character, hammer and rainbow-colored pieces.

Many children's games make mention of Daruma. In Japanese, snowmen are called "Yukidaruma" (Japanese: 雪だるま), literally snow daruma. Possibly because the shape is related to Daruma, they usually only have two sections instead of three. Darumasan ga Koronda is an equivalent to the American Red Light/Green Light game. Daruma Otoshi (だるま落とし) is a traditional game played with a daruma doll in five pieces, usually in the colors of the rainbow, from top to bottom: head – a man's face, blue, green, yellow, red. The game is played by using a small hammer to hit each of the colored pieces, from bottom to the top, without letting the pieces fall during the game.

In 2010, The Pokémon Company created the Pokémon "Darumaka" and "Darmanitan", which are based on Daruma dolls.

== See also ==
- Japanese craft
- Japanese dolls
- Religions of Japan
- As The Gods Will

== Sources ==
- Chapin, Helen B. "Three Early Portraits of Bodhidharma." Archives of the Chinese Art Society of America, Vol. 1 (1945/1946), 66–98
- Kyburz Josef A., " "Omocha": Things to Play (Or Not to Play) with" Asian Folklore Studies, Vol.53, No. 1 (1994), 1–28
- Faure, Bernard. "Bodhidharma as Textual and Religious Paradigm." History of Religions, Vol. 25, No. 3 (Feb., 1986), 187–198
- Gettis, Alan. Seven Times Down, Eight Times Up: Landing on Your Feet in an Upside-down World. Trafford Publishing, 2003
- Greer, Monte A. "Daruma Eyes: The Sixth Century Founder of Zen Buddhism and Kung Fu Had the Earliest Recorded Graves' Ophthalmopathy." Thyroid. May 2002, 12(5): 389–391
- Jorgensen, John (2000), "Bodhidharma", in Johnston, William M. (ed.), Encyclopedia of Monasticism: A-L, Taylor & Francis
- McRae, John (2003), Seeing Through Zen. Encounter, Transformation, and Genealogy in Chinese Chan Buddhism, The University Press Group Ltd, ISBN 978-0-520-23798-8
- Rotermund, Hartmut O. "Demonic Affliction or Contagious Disease? Changing Perceptions of Smallpox in the Late Edo Period." Japanese Journal of Religious Studies 2001 28/3–4
- Ulak, James T. "Japanese Works in The Art Institute of Chicago: Five Recent Acquisitions" Art Institute of Chicago Museum Studies, Vol. 19, No. 2(1993), 174–185, 154–157, 205–207
- Punsmann, Henry. "Daruma, a Symbol of Luck" Folklore Studies, Vol. 21 (1962), 241–244
- "Japan: The Right Eye of Daruma". Time. Friday, Feb. 10, 1967
- McFarland, H. Neill. "Feminine Motifs in Bodhidharma Symbology in Japan" Asian Folklore Studies, Vol. 45, No. 2 (1986), pp. 167–191
