= Dairyū-ji (Gifu) =

Buddhist temple in Gifu Prefecture, Japan

Coordinates: 35°29′24.93″N 136°47′18.14″E

Dairyū-ji 大龍寺
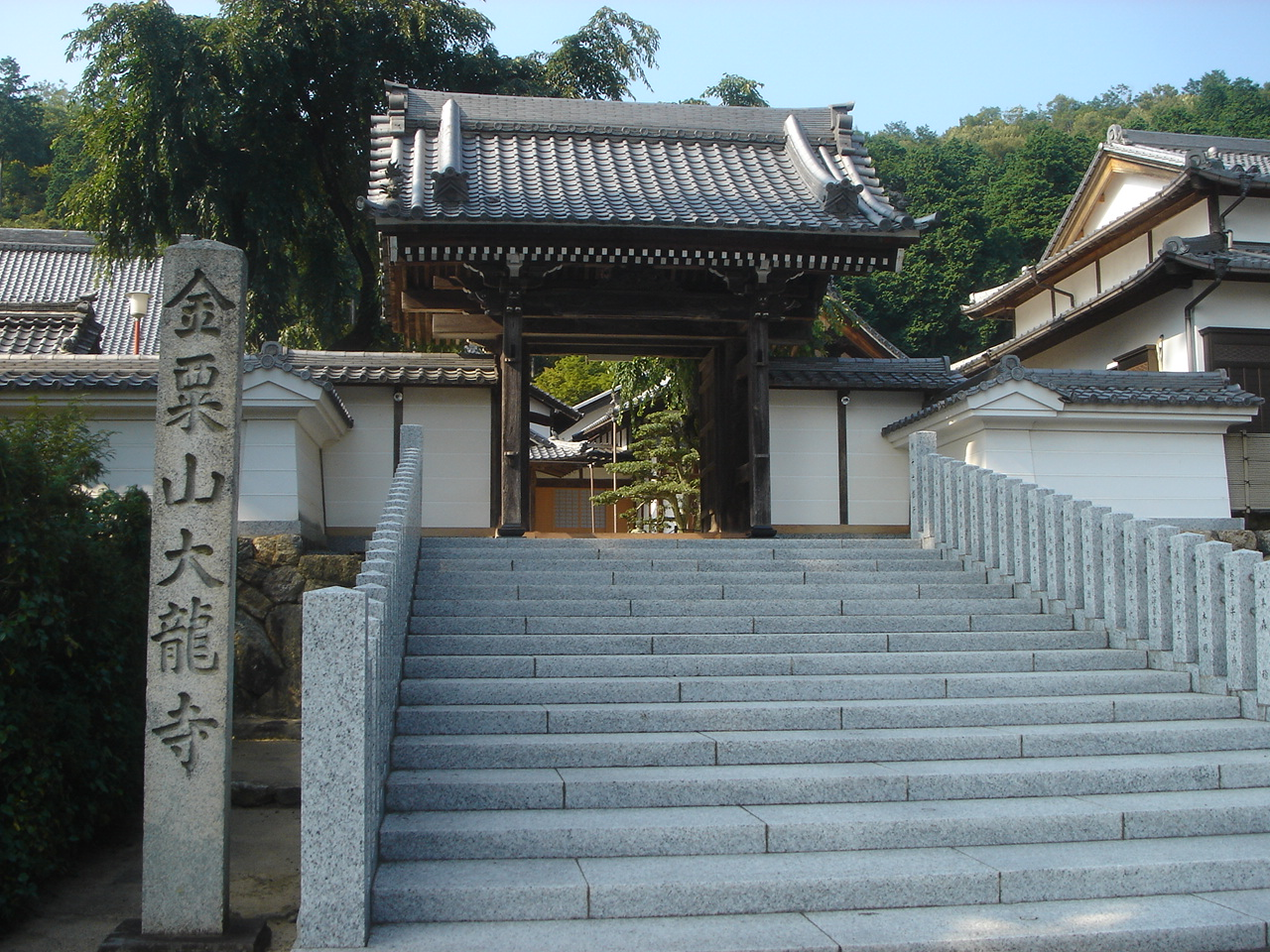
- Entrance to Dairyū-ji

Religion
- Affiliation: Rinzai

Location
- Location: 2339 Awano; Gifu, Gifu Prefecture; 502-0001
- Country: Japan
- Interactive map of Dairyū-ji 大龍寺

Architecture
- Completed: ca. 7th century

Website
- http://www.dairyuji.com/ Dairyū-ji

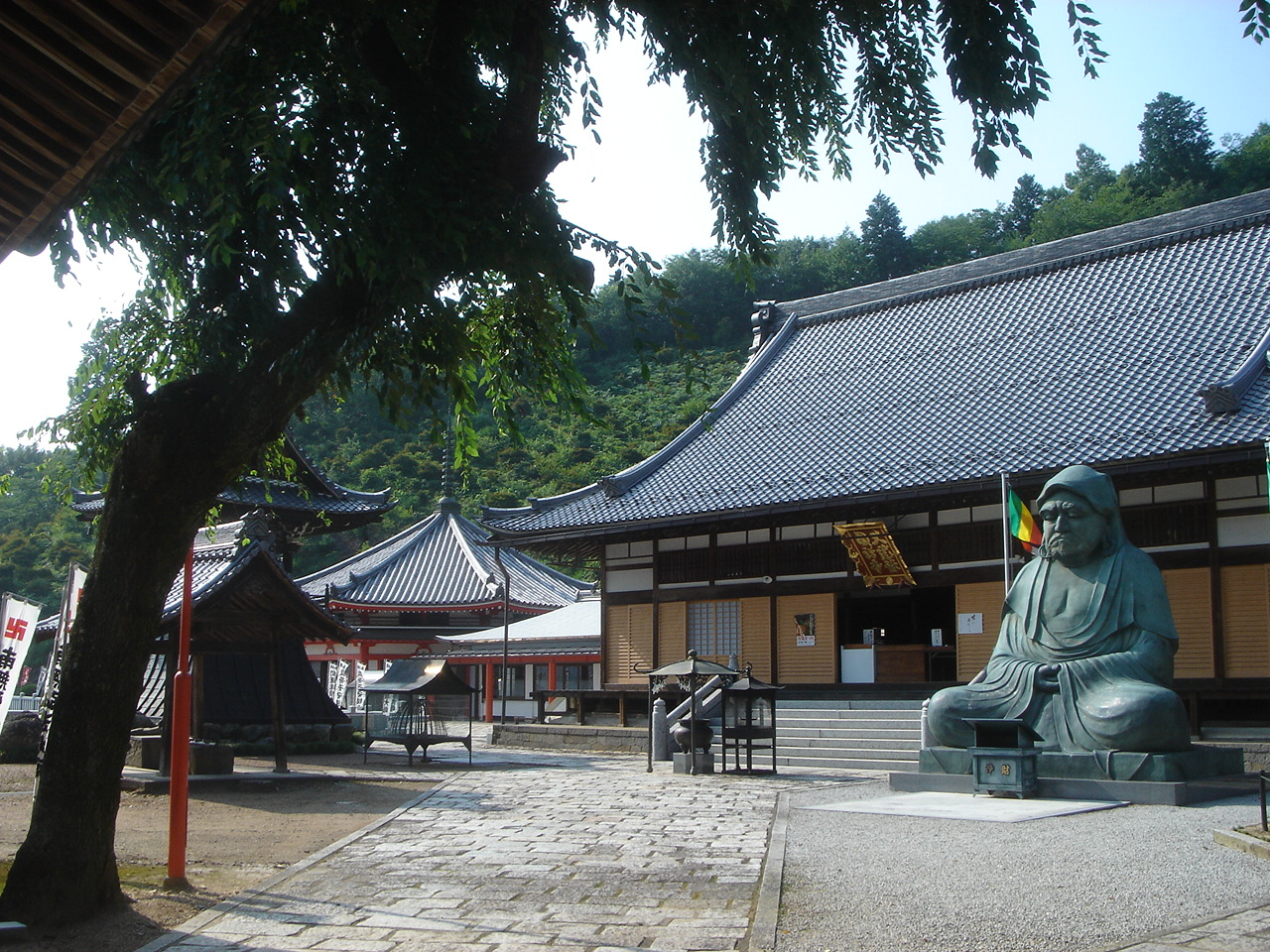
Inside the temple grounds

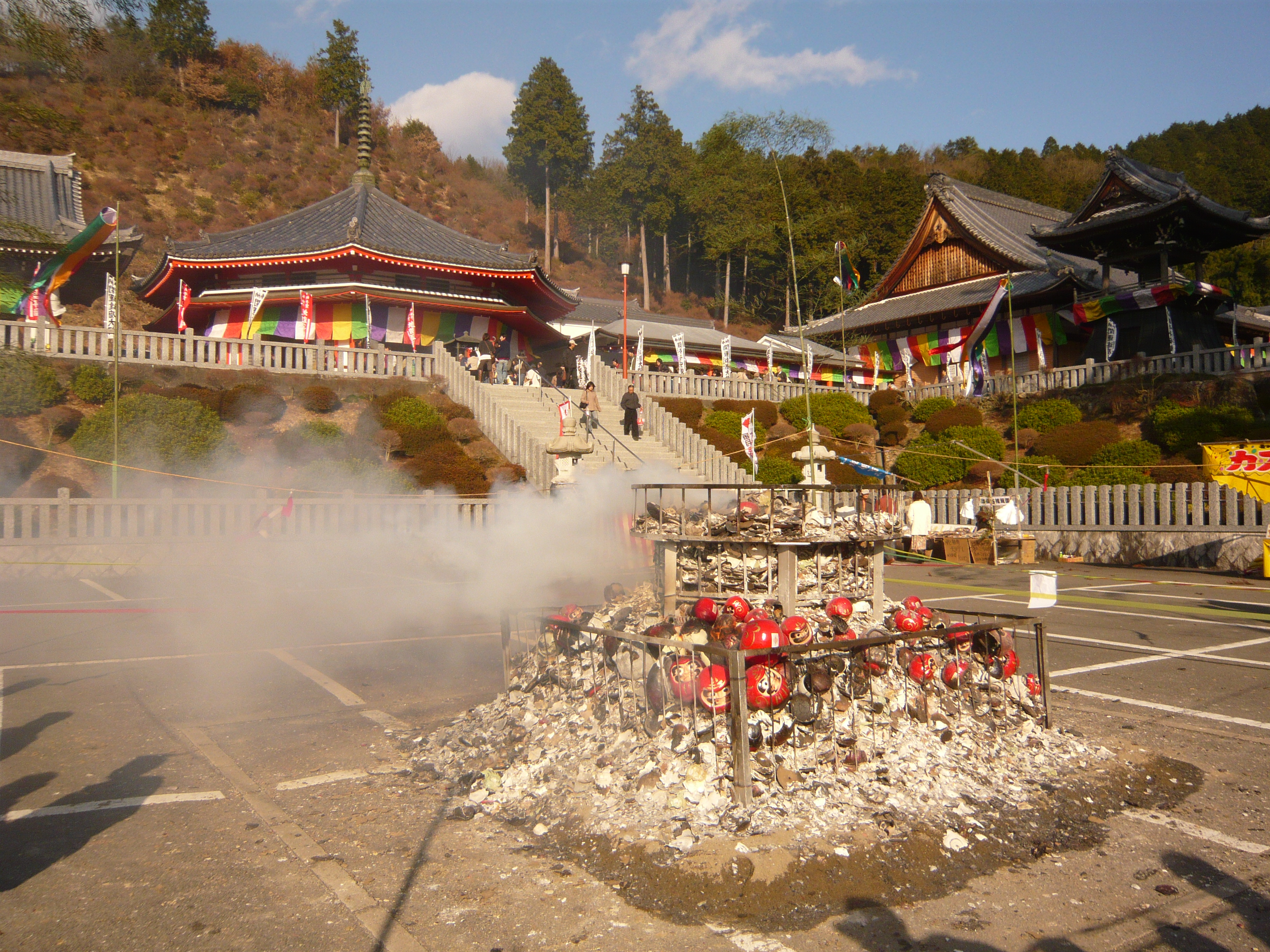
Burning of the daruma

Dairyū-ji (大龍寺) is a Buddhist temple of the Rinzai school located in Gifu, Gifu Prefecture, Japan. It is one of the Mino Thirty-three Kannon. It is located near the Takatomi-chō area of Yamagata, so it is also sometimes referred to as Takatomi Dairyū-ji (高富大龍寺). Also, it has an annual festival at which daruma dolls are burned, giving it another nickname, Daruma Kannon (だるま観音).

The temple has strong ties to both the Toki clan and Inaba Ittetsu.

== History ==
Dairyū-ji was constructed as a national shrine in the Asuka period during the reign of Empress Jitō. During the Heian period, it came under the influence of the Shingon school of Buddhism. Emperor Go-Shirakawa enshrined a bodhisattva in the temple.

During the Meiō era, the Toki clan gained power of the area and control of the temple. In 1502, just after the Meiō era ended, the temple came under control of the Rinzai school of Zen.

== Daruma Memorial Service ==
The temple holds an annual memorial service each year for daruma whose wishes have been fulfilled. Approximately 10,000 figures are burned each year and it takes an entire day for the figures to burn. Until 2007, the festival was held every year on January 18, but the date has since been changed to the second Sunday of the year.
