= Sen (surname) =

Origin
- Origin: Bengali Hindu
- Region of origin: Bengal

Sen is a native Bengali Hindu surname. The meaning of the Sanskrit word is "being a lord, master or leader".

The surname is commonly found in the Bengal region of the Indian subcontinent; namely Bangladesh West Bengal, India mainly among Bengali Baidya and Kayastha communities. The Sena kings of Bengal claimed themselves as Brahmakshatriya or Kshatriya in their own inscriptions. The surname is also found among some other castes of Bengal like Suvarna Banik, Gandhabanik and Teli.

== History ==
The use of 'Sena' as a title is first found among the kings of a dynasty named as Vakataka (Vidarbha). This surname is also used by Raja Dahir, the last king of Brahman dynasty of Sindh (Southeastern Pakistan) and then followed by Sena Dynasty (Eastern India and Bangladesh).

== Notables ==
=== A ===
- Abhijit Sen is a former member of the Planning Commission of India, which was disbanded in 2014.
- Akshay Kumar Sen the 19th-century Bengali mystic, saint and writer
- Amal Sen was a Bangladeshi politician. He was the founding president of the Workers Party of Bangladesh.
- Amalesh Sen (Bengali: অমলেশ সেন; 2 March 1943 – 7 October 2017) was a Bangladeshi football player and coach.
- Amarendra Nath Sen, jurist who served as the chief justice of the Calcutta High Court in 1979 and as a judge in the Supreme Court of India.
- Amartya Sen (born 1933), Indian economist and philosopher, Nobel Prize winner
- Amiya Sen (cricketer) (1925–2000), Indian cricketer
- Amiya Prosad Sen (born 1952), historian and religious scholar
- Ananda Prakash Sen (1923–?), often known as A. P. Sen, is an Indian former judge who served as a Chief Justice of the Supreme Court of India
- Anil Kumar Sen, jurist
- Anindya Sen Economist
- Antara Dev Sen (born 1963), British–Indian journalist
- Anupam Sen (1920s-2015), Indian politician, West Bengal Legislative Assembly
- Anupam Sen (born August 5, 1940) is a Bangladeshi academic and social scientist.
- Anushka Sen (born 2002), Indian model and television actress
- Aparna Sen (born 1945), an Indian filmmaker, screenwriter and actress
- Arunava Sen (born January 3, 1959) is a professor of economics at the Indian Statistical Institute. He works on Game Theory, Social Choice Theory, Mechanism Design, Voting and Auctions.
- Ashalata Sen (5 February 1894 - 13 February 1986) was an activist, poet, social worker, and a leading figure in the Indian independence movement.
- Ashish Sen is an American professor and transportation statistician based in Chicago
- Ashoke Sen, theoretical physicist
- Ashoke Kumar Sen former law minister, lawyer, and parliamentarian
- Asit Sen (actor) (1917–1993), prolific Indian film actor and comedian in the Hindi film industry
- Asit Sen (director) (24 September 1922 – 25 August 2001) was an Indian film director, cinematographer and screenwriter, who worked in both Bengali and Hindi cinema. He was born in Dhaka, now in modern-day Bangladesh, when it was part of East Bengal in British India. He directed 17 feature films in Hindi and Bengali
- Atul Sen (? – 5 August 1932) (Bengali: অতুল সেন) was a Bengali Indian independence movement revolutionary activist against British rule in India.
- Atul Prasad Sen (Bengali: অতুল প্রসাদ সেন; 20 October 1871 – 26 August 1934) was a Bengali composer, lyricist and singer, and also a lawyer, philanthropist, social worker, educationist and writer.

=== B ===
- Baikuntha Nath Sen CIE (1843 – 1922) was a Bengali scholar, lawyer and philanthropist. His grandson Amarendra Nath Sen was a judge of Supreme Court of India.
- Basiswar Sen also known as "Boshi" Sen (1887 – 31 August 1971), Indian agricultural scientist.
- Benu Sen (26 May 1932 – 17 May 2011) was an awarded Indian photographer from Kolkata, India.
- Bhim Sen (1 December 1894 – 18 January 1978) was an Indian politician. He was the Chief Minister of Punjab, thrice.
- Bhupati Mohan Sen was an Indian physicist and mathematician. He made remarkable contributions in the fields of Quantum Mechanics and Fluid Mechanics.
- Bijoy Sen is a Bangladeshi art director. He won Bangladesh National Film Award for Best Art Direction for the film Andha Biswas (1992).
- Binay Ranjan Sen, former Director General of the Food and Agriculture Organization of the United Nations
- Binayak Sen, human rights activist
- Bireswar Sen, (1897–1974) Indian painter, writer and teacher, influenced by the Bengal School of Art and Western modernism, but later developed a visual language of miniatures.

=== C ===
- Chandan Sen a Bengali stage, television and film actor, playwright and director
- Chandan K. Sen is an Indian-American scientist who is known for contributions to the fields of regenerative medicine and wound care
- Chitra Sen, an Indian actress and dancer who works in Bengali language films and television series

=== D ===
- Dahir Sen, last ruler of the Brahman dynasty of Sindh
- Deben Sen (1897 – 19 April 1971) was an Indian trade union activist and politician.
- Dinesh Chandra Sen, researcher of Bengali folklore
- Dola Sen (born 26 March 1967) is an Indian politician and trade unionist. From 2020 she is now the central president of the Indian National Trinamool Trade Union Congress (INTTUC).

=== E ===
- Erroll Chunder Sen (1899 – after 1941?), First World War Indian pilot in the Royal Flying Corps

=== G ===
- Gautam Sen is an Indian journalist, writer and automotive design consultant and expert.
- Gertrude Emerson Sen (6 May 1890–1982), early 20th-century expert on Asia and a founding member of the Society of Woman Geographers
- Girish Chandra Sen(c. 1835 – 15 August 1910), Bengali religious scholar and first Bengali translator of the Quran

=== H ===
- Haimabati Sen (1866 – 1932 or 1933), was an Indian physician
- Hannah Sen (1894–1957) was an Indian educator, politician, and feminist, wife of Satish Chandra Sen. She was a member of the first Indian Rajya Sabha (upper house of Parliament) from 1952 to 1957 and the president of the All India Women's Conference in 1951-52
- Hari Keshab Sen (9 February 1905 - 1 September 1976), popularly known as H. K. Sen was an Indian Bengali scientist, astrophysicist
- Hiralal Sen is generally considered the first filmmaker of indian subcontinent
- H. Nida Sen H.Nida Sen is an ophthalmologist researching mechanisms involved in different forms of human uveitis. She is a clinical investigator at the National Eye Institute

=== I ===
- Inder Sen is an Indian film director, producer and screenwriter working in Bengali cinema.
- Indra Sen (13 May 1903 – 14 March 1994) was a psychologist, author, and educator, and the founder of Integral psychology as an academic discipline. Sen was born in the Jhelum District of Punjab (now part of Pakistan) in a Punjabi Hindu family from Punjab.
- Indrani Sen A Bengali singer who is known for Nazrul geeti and Rabindra Sangeet.
- Ivan Sen (born 1972) is an Indigenous Australian filmmaker.

=== J ===
- Jaladhar Sen Rai Bahadur Jaladhar Sen (Bengali: জলধর সেন; 13 March 1860 – 15 March 1939) was a Bengali writer, poet, editor and also a philanthropist, traveler, social worker, educationist and littérateur. He was awarded with the title Ray Bahadur (রায় বাহাদুর) by the British Government.
- Jogendra Nath Sen, First Bengali soldier to die in the First World War
- Joginder Sen Raja Sir Joginder Sen Bahadur KCSI (20 August 1904 – 16 June 1986) was the last ruling Raja of Mandi State, and was subsequently a diplomat and Member of Parliament.

=== K ===
- Kaushik Sen (or Koushik Sen; born 19 September 1968), Indian film, television and theatre actor based in Kolkata
- Keshav Sen (reigned 1225–1230), ruler of the Sen Empire, reformer of "Kaulinya" and "Varna" in vernacular literature
- Keshav Sen (born 21 September 1923) is an Indian former sports shooter. He competed in the trap event at the 1960 Summer Olympics.
- Keshub Chandra Sen (1838–1884), Hindu philosopher and social reformer
- Konkona Sen (born 3 December 1979), Indian actress, writer, and director
- Krishna Sen (19 October 1956 – 27 May 2002), Nepalese writer and journalist
- Kshitimohan Sen (2 December 1880 – 12 March 1960), Indian scholar, writer, and Sanskrit professor

=== L ===
- Lakshman Sen, Emperor
- Lakshya Sen (born 2001), Indian badminton player
- Lalmohan Sen (Bengali: লালমোহন সেন) was an Indian revolutionary who took part in the Chittagong Armoury Raid
- Lionel Protip Sen Lieutenant-General Lionel Protip "Bogey" Sen DSO (20 October 1910 – 17 September 1981) was an Indo-British decorated Indian Army general. He served as the Chief of the General Staff during 1959–1961 and commanded the Eastern Command during 1961–1963

=== M ===
- Mala Sen (3 June 1947 – 21 May 2011) was a Bengali-Indian-British writer and human rights activist
- Malabika Sen, Dancer
- Mandakranta Sen (born 1972) is an Indian poet writing in Bengali. She became the youngest-ever winner of Ananda Puraskar in 1999 for her very first poetry book. In 2004 she was awarded Sahitya Akademi Golden Jubilee Award for poetry. She is also a lyricist, composer, fiction writer, dramatist and cover designer. She quit medical studies to become a full-time writer.
- Manikuntala Sen (Bengali: মণিকুন্তলা সেন; c. 1911–1987) was one of the first women to be active in the Communist Party of India.
- Mantu Sen (21 June 1923 – 12 April 1990) was an Indian cricketer. He played eighteen first-class matches for Bengal between 1942 and 1959.
- Mayukh Sen is an American writer. He was nominated for a James Beard Award in 2018 and 2019, winning the award in 2018 for his profile of Princess Pamela.
- Mihir Sen (born 1930), a famous Indian long-distance swimmer
- Mimlu Sen (born 1949) is an Indian author, translator, musician, composer and producer.
- Minati Sen (born 2 October 1943) Politician, was a member of the 14th Lok Sabha of India.
- Mithu Sen is an Indian conceptual artist. Born in West Bengal in 1971.
- Mohit Sen was a communist intellectual. He was general secretary of the United Communist Party of India until of his death.
- Moon Moon Sen (born 1954), an Indian actress working in Bengali, Hindi and other regional films
- Mrinal Sen, Dadasaheb Phalke award-winning film director
- Mrinal Kanti Sen, an Indian-American geophysicist.
- Mrinalini Sen (3 August 1879 - 8 March 1972) was a Bengali writer in British India. On 19 December 1910, she became the first Indian to fly in a plane.
- Mukunda Sen (sometimes known as Makanda Sen) was the King of Palpa from 1518 to 1553 of Sena dynasty (Nepal). In 1524, he invaded Kathmandu Valley.

=== N ===
- Nabaneeta Dev Sen
- Nabhendu Sen (31 August 1944 – 25 September 2008) a Bengali dramatist, sculptor and artist
- Nabinchandra Sen, poet and writer
- Nandana Sen (born 1967), daughter of Amartya Sen, actress in Hindi cinema, screenwriter
- Narayan Sen (1912–1956) was a Bengali revolutionary in the Indian independence movement
- Neeta Sen (1935 – 1 April 2006) was an Indian classical music director and singer
- Nibedita Sen is a queer Bengali-born writer of speculative fiction
- Nikhil Sen (16 April 1931 – 25 February 2019) was a Bangladeshi dramatist. He was awarded Ekushey Padak in 2018 by the Government of Bangladesh.
- Nilima Sen (1928 Kolkata –1996) was a famous Rabindrasangeet singer.
- Nirupam Sen (cricketer)
- Nirupam Sen (diplomat)
- Nirupam Sen (politician)
- Nirupam Sen Chowdhary (born 23 October 1990) is an Indian first-class cricketer who plays for Tripura
- Nivaan Sen also known as Naveen Sen, is an Indian actor and producer
- Noel Swaranjit Sen (born 24 December 1946) is a retired Director-General and Inspector-General of Police in the state of Andhra Pradesh, India. After a stint with the Indian Army (Short Service Commission) in the 1960s, he became an Officer of the Indian Police Service. He was also a Commandant of the 1st Battalion of Border Security Force

=== O ===
- Orijit Sen (born 1963) is an Indian graphic artist and designer.

=== P ===
- Pabitra Kumar Sen, scientist and social reformer
- Palash Sen, Band member of Euphoria (Indian band)
- Paritosh Sen (Bengali: পরিতোষ সেন) (18 October 1918 – 22 October 2008) was a leading Indian artist. He was born in Dhaka (then known as Dacca)
- Partha Sen was an economist
- Prafulla Chandra Sen (1897–1990), Bengali freedom fighter and politician, Chief Minister of West Bengal from 1962 to 1967.
- Prafulla Kumar Sen (died 1942), also known as "Swami Satyananda Puri" Indian revolutionary and philosopher
- Prajesh Sen G. Prajesh Sen (also spelt G. Prajesh Sen; born 29 May 1979) is an Indian filmmaker and writer
- Pranab Kumar Sen (1937–2023) was a statistician
- Prasenjit Sen (born 11 January 1956) Physical Scientist
- Probir Sen, wicket-keeper, the only wicket-keeper to have stumped out Sir Donald Bradman
- P. K. Sen (surgeon) (1915–1982), Indian surgeon

=== R ===
- Raima Sen (born 1979), Indian actress
- Raja Sen (10 November 1955 - 16 August 2026), Indian film & television director and the winner of three National Film Awards
- Rajanikanta Sen (26 July 1865 – 13 September 1910) was a Bengali poet and composer, known for his devotional (bhakti) compositions
- Rajat Sen (1913 ― 6 May 1930) alias Rajat Kumar Sen was a Bengali revolutionary who joined in the Chittagong armoury raid.
- Ramesh Chandra Sen (born 30 April 1940), Bangladeshi politician
- Ramkamal Sen (Bengali: রামকমল সেন) (1783–1844) was the Diwan of the Treasury, Treasurer of the Bank of Bengal and Secretary of the Asiatic Society
- Ramprasad Sen, singer and lyricist
- Rangalal Sen (24 September 1933 – 10 February 2014) was a Bangladesh academician and writer. In 2011, he was inducted as the National Professor of Bangladesh.
- Reema Sen (born 1981), Indian actress and model primarily working in Tamil, Telugu and Hindi films
- Riddhi Sen, an Indian Bengali film actor
- Rii Sen, actress
- Rimi Sen (born 1981), Indian actress and film producer who has appeared in Bollywood, Telugu and Bengali films
- Rinku Sen is an Indian-American author, activist, political strategist and the executive director of Narrative Initiative. She is also the co-president of the Women’s March Board of Directors. Sen is the former president and executive director of the racial justice organization Race Forward and publisher of Colorlines.com and Mother Jones magazine.
- Rittika Sen, an Indian actress
- Riya Sen (born 1981), Indian film actress and model
- Robin Sen was an Indian politician belonging to the Communist Party of India(Marxist). He was elected to the Lok Sabha, lower house of the Parliament
- Ronen Sen Ranendra "Ronen" Sen (born 9 April 1944) is a veteran Indian diplomat who was India's ambassador to the United States of America

=== S ===
- Sagar Sen (15 May 1932 – 4 January 1983) was a Bengali singer
- Samar Sen (c. 1916-2004), Indian agricultural economist
- Samar Sen, (Bengali: সমর সেন;)(10 October 1916 – 23 August 1987), Indian poet and journalist
- Samar Sen (diplomat) (10 August 1914 – 16 February 2003), Indian diplomat
- Samita Sen, historian and professor
- Sandip Sen (born 4 October 1966) is an Indian business executive.
- Sandipta Sen (born 1987), Bengali television actress
- Sanjoy Sen, Football coach and manager
- Sankar Sen (c. 1928 – 8 February 2020) was a Minister, Vice Chancellor, Electrical engineer and politician from West Bengal belonging to Communist Party of India (Marxist). He was the vice-chancellor of Jadavpur University. He served as a legislator of the West Bengal Legislative Assembly. He also served as the Minister of Power of the Government of West Bengal from 1991 to 1999.
- Sankar Sen (marketing academic) A marketing academic.
- Santanu Sen is an Indian doctor and politician. He was a councilor in the Kolkata Municipal Corporation. He is a Rajya Sabha member from West Bengal. He was the President of the Indian Medical Association.
- Santosh Kumar Sen (1910–1979) was an Indian surgeon and the president of the Association of Surgeons of India. He was the first Indian surgeon to be elected to the Fellowship of the Royal College of Surgeons of England.
- Sarajubala Sen(Bengali: লেখক:সরযূবালা সেন) (1889 - 1949) was a Bengali writer and educator.
- Satrajit Sen (born 1977) an Indian film director, producer and entrepreneur, who won a Lee Strasberg: National Award in 2014 for best Bengali Film Bakita Byaktigato
- Satyen Sen (Bengali: সত্যেন সেন), (28 March 1907 - 5 January 1981), a historian of Bengali literature from Bangladesh.
- Shekhar Sen is a singer, a music composer, a lyricist, and an actor, Awards: Padma Shri(2015)
- Shobha Sen (1923–2017), also known as Sova Sen, Bengali theatre and film actress
- Shoma Sen An women's rights activist, professor and head of the English literature department of the Nagpur University
- Shyamal Kumar Sen, jurist and former governor of West Bengal
- Sohag Sen (Bengali: সোহাগ সেন) is a Bengali theatre actress, director and casting director.
- Sohail Sen (born 24 June 1984) is a contemporary Indian film composer, musician and singer who works in Bollywood
- Sen Sōshitsu XV (1923–2025), Japanese tea master
- Soumik Sen an Indian contemporary screenwriter
- Soumitra Sen is a former judge of the Calcutta High Court. He was the first judge in independent India whose removal motion was passed in Rajya Sabha for misappropriation of funds.
- Srabani Sen (also spelt as Sraboni Sen), singer of Rabindra Sangeet and other genres of Bengali songs
- Subir Sen (24 July 1934 – 29 December 2015) was an Indian playback singer who sang modern songs in Bengali and Hindi. He was also one of the artists of Rabindra Sangeet
- Suchitra Sen (born as Roma Dasgupta, 1931), Indian actress
- Sudeep Sen, poet
- Sukomal Sen (14 June 1934 – 22 November 2017) was an Indian trade union and CPI(M) leader.
- Sukumar Sen (civil servant) -(2 January 1898 – 13 May 1963) The first Chief Election Commissioner of India
- Surya Sen (1894–1934), revolutionary and Bengali freedom fighter
- Sukumar Sen, Bengali linguist
- Supriyo Sen a contemporary independent filmmaker from India. He produced and directed the film Tangra Blues (2021)
- Sushil Sen full name Shushil Kumar Sen (Bengali: সুশিল কুমার সেন; 1892 – 30 April 1915) participated in the Indian Independence Movement.
- Susmit Sen, member of the band Indian Ocean
- Sushmita Sen (born 1975), Indian actress, model and beauty queen; former Miss Universe
- Swati Sen An Indian actress most known for her roles in Udedh Bun, which won the Silver Bear for Best Film at the 2008 Berlin International Film Festival, and the National Film Award-winning Antardwand (2010),

=== T ===
- Tanima Sen is a Bengali film and television actress.
- Tapan Kumar Sen A politician from the Communist Party of India (Marxist), General Secretary of Centre of Indian Trade Unions, a Member of the Parliament of India representing West Bengal in the Rajya Sabha, the upper house of the Indian Parliament
- Tapas Sen (11 September 1924 – 28 June 2006) was a noted Indian stage lighting designer, who was an important figure in 20th-century Indian theatre
- Tapen Sen(born 2 September 1953) is a former judge of the Calcutta High Court, the Punjab and Haryana High Court and the Jharkhand High Court and is currently holding the chair as the President of the Jharkhand State Consumer Disputes Redressal Commission
- Triguna Sen (24 December 1905 – 11 January 1998) was Union Minister for education in Government of India. He got Padma Bhushan in 1965

=== U ===
- Utpala Sen (12 March 1924 – 13 May 2005) was a prominent Indian Bengali playback singer.

=== V ===
- Vikramajit Sen (born 31 December 1950) is an Indian Judge, who has served as a sitting judge of the Supreme Court of India
- Vishwak Sen (born 1995), Indian actor who works in Telugu films

== Fictional characters ==
- Banalata Sen, fictional character in Jibanananda Das's poem
- Mr. Saurav Sen, fictional characters in Jhumpa Lahiri's short story, Mrs. Sen's, from her collection of short stories, Interpreter of Maladies.

== See also ==
- Şen, Turkish surname
