= Samar Sen =

Samar Sen may refer to:

- Samar Sen (poet) (1916–1987), Indian Bengali poet and journalist
- Samar Sen (diplomat) (1914–2003), Indian diplomat
- Samar Sen (economist) (c. 1915–2004), Indian agricultural economist
