= Jayati Ghosh =

Indian economist

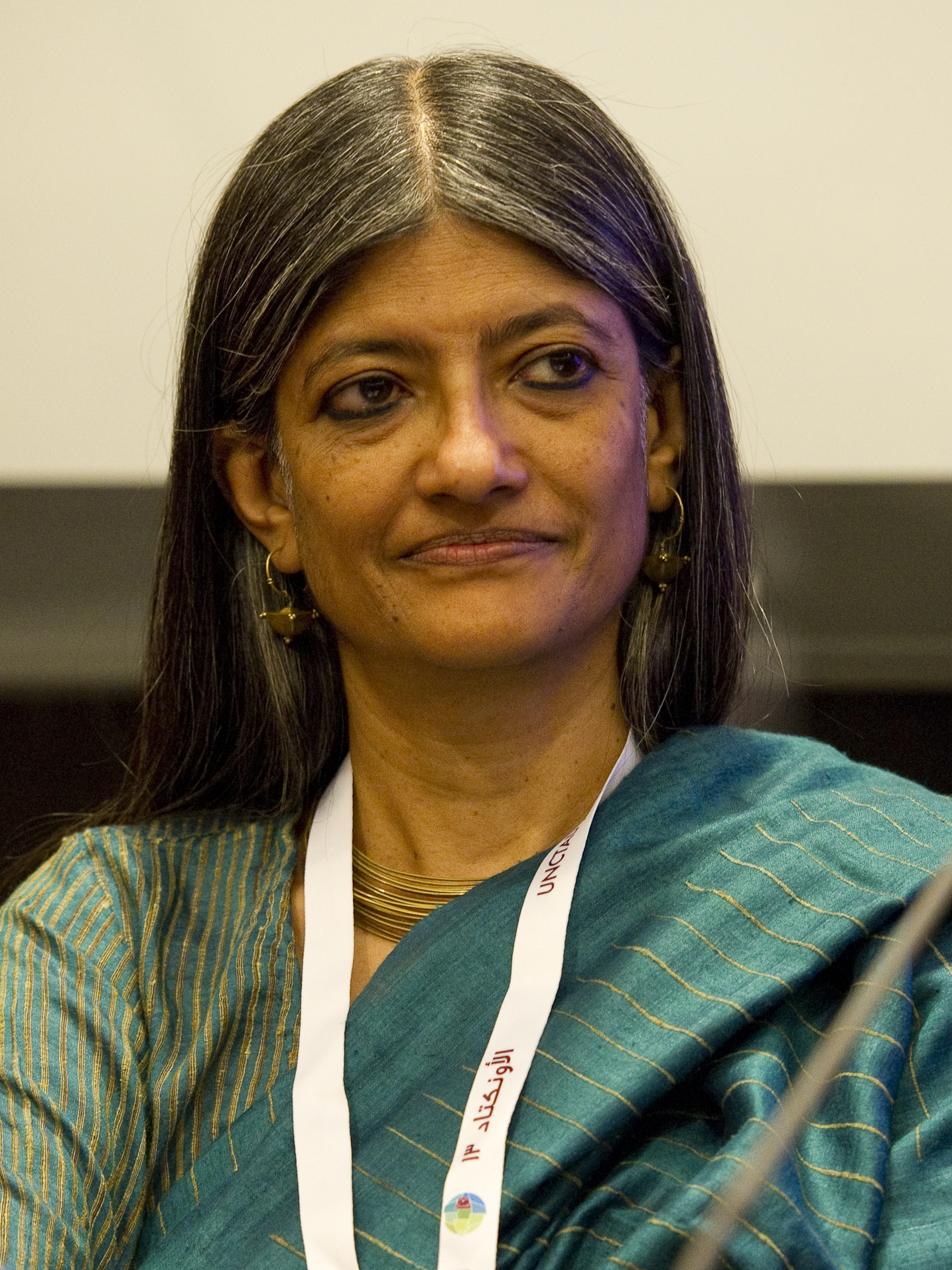
- Ghosh in 2012
- Born: 16 September 1955 (age 71)
- Spouse: Abhijit Sen

Academic background
- Education: University of Delhi (BA); Jawaharlal Nehru University (MA, MPhil); University of Cambridge (PhD)
- Doctoral advisor: Terence J. Byres, Geoffrey C. Harcourt

Academic work
- Discipline: Development economics
- Institutions: Jawaharlal Nehru University, Delhi; University of Massachusetts Amherst

Jayati Ghosh (born 16 September 1955) is an Indian development economist. She taught economics at Jawaharlal Nehru University, New Delhi for nearly 35 years, and since January 2021 she has been Professor of Economics at the University of Massachusetts Amherst, USA. Her core areas of study include international economics and globalisation, employment patterns in developing countries, macroeconomic policy, and gender and development.

== Early life and education ==
Jayati Ghosh was born on 16 September 1955. Ghosh attended Miranda House, Delhi University for her undergraduate and got her MA in economics from Jawaharlal Nehru University. She joined Cambridge University for her MPhil and PhD after winning the Inlaks Scholarship. Her 1984 doctoral thesis at Cambridge University was entitled The Non capitalist Land Rent: Theories and the Case of North India under the supervision of Dr. Terence J. Byres, Geoffrey C. Harcourt and Suzanne Paine.

== Career ==
In addition to her teaching, Ghosh has authored and/or edited 21 books and more than 220 scholarly articles. Recent books include The making of a catastrophe: Covid-19 and the Indian economy, Aleph Books 2022; When governments fail: Covid-19 and the economy, Tulika Books and Columbia University Press 2021 (co-edited); Women workers in the informal economy, Routledge 2021 (edited); Never Done and Poorly Paid: Women’s Work in Globalising India, Women Unlimited, New Delhi 2009; co-edited Elgar Handbook of Alternative Theories of Economic Development, 2014; co-edited After Crisis, Tulika 2009; co-authored Demonetisation Decoded, Routledge 2017.

Ghosh has advised governments in India and other countries, including as Chairperson of the Andhra Pradesh Commission on Farmers’ Welfare in 2004, and Member of the National Knowledge Commission of India (2005–09). She was the Executive Secretary of International Development Economics Associates, an international network of heterodox development economists, from 2002 to 2021. She has consulted for international organizations including ILO, UNDP, UNCTAD, UN-DESA, UNRISD and UN Women and is member of several international boards and commissions, including the UN High-Level Advisory Board on Economic and Social Affairs, the Commission on Global Economic Transformation of INET, and the International Commission for the Reform of International Corporate Taxation (ICRICT). In 2021 she was appointed to the WHO Council on the Economics of Health for All, chaired by Mariana Mazzucato. She's a member of the Club of Rome. In March 2022, she was appointed to the UN Secretary General's High-Level Advisory Board on Effective Multilateralism, mandated to provide a vision for international cooperation to deal with current and future challenges. She also writes regularly for popular media, including newspapers, journals and blogs, including Project Syndicate, Frontline, The Guardian and Hindu BusinessLine.

== Awards and recognitions ==
Ghosh has received a number of awards, including:

- John Kenneth Galbraith award, 2023 from the Agricultural and Applied Economics Association, "in recognition of breakthrough discoveries in economics and outstanding contributions to humanity through leadership, research and service."
- International Economic Association Fellow Award, 2023.
- Adiseshaiah Award for distinguished contributions to the social sciences in India, 2015.
- Conference President, Indian Society for Labour Economics, 2013.
- Satyendranath Sen Award, Asiatic Society, Kolkata, 2012.
- ILO Decent Work Research Prize, Geneva, 2011.
- NordSud Prize for Research in Social Sciences, Fondazione Pescarabruzzo, Italy, 2010.
- Ava Maiti Memorial Prize, Asiatic Society, Kolkata 2006.
- UNDP Award for Excellence in Analysis, (for West Bengal Human Development Report), New York 2006.

== Personal life ==
Ghosh was married to Abhijit Sen, an economist who was a member of the disbanded Planning Commission. He died in 2022. She has one daughter, Jahnavi Sen.

== Selected bibliography ==
- Ghosh, Jayati. The making of a catastrophe: the disastrous economic fallout of the Covid-19 pandemic in India. Aleph Books (2022).
- Dixson-Declève, Sandrine, Owen Gaffney, Jayati Ghosh, Jorgen Randers, Johan Rockstrom, and Per Espen Stoknes. Earth for All: A survival guide for humanity. New Society Publishers, 2022.
- Rawal, Vikas, Jayati Ghosh, and C. P. Chandrasekhar. When governments fail: a pandemic and its aftermath. Tulika (2021).
- Ghosh, Jayati, ed. Informal women workers in the Global South: Policies and practices for the formalisation of women's employment in developing economies. Routledge, 2021.
- Reinert, Erik S., Jayati Ghosh, and Rainer Kattel, eds. Handbook of alternative theories of economic development. Edward Elgar Publishing, 2016.
- Ghosh, Jayati (ed.), Economics: Volume 2: India and the International Economy, ICSSR Research Surveys and Explorations (Delhi, 2015).
- Ghosh, Jayati; Chandrasekhar, C.P. (2001). Crisis as conquest: learning from East Asia. New Delhi: Orient Longman. ISBN 9788125018988.
- Ghosh, Jayati; Chandrasekhar, C.P. (2004) [1st. pub. LeftWord Books:2002]. The market that failed: neoliberal economic reforms in India (2nd ed.). New Delhi: LeftWord Books. ISBN 9788187496458. Also reprinted January 2008, January 2009, July 2011.
- Ghosh, Jayati (2009). Never done and poorly paid: women's work in globalising India. New Delhi: Women Unlimited. ISBN 9788188965441.
- Ghosh, Jayati (2009). After crisis: adjustment, recovery, and fragility in East Asia. New Delhi: Tulika Books. ISBN 9788189487584.

== See also ==
- Feminist economics
- List of feminist economists
