= Anindya Sen =

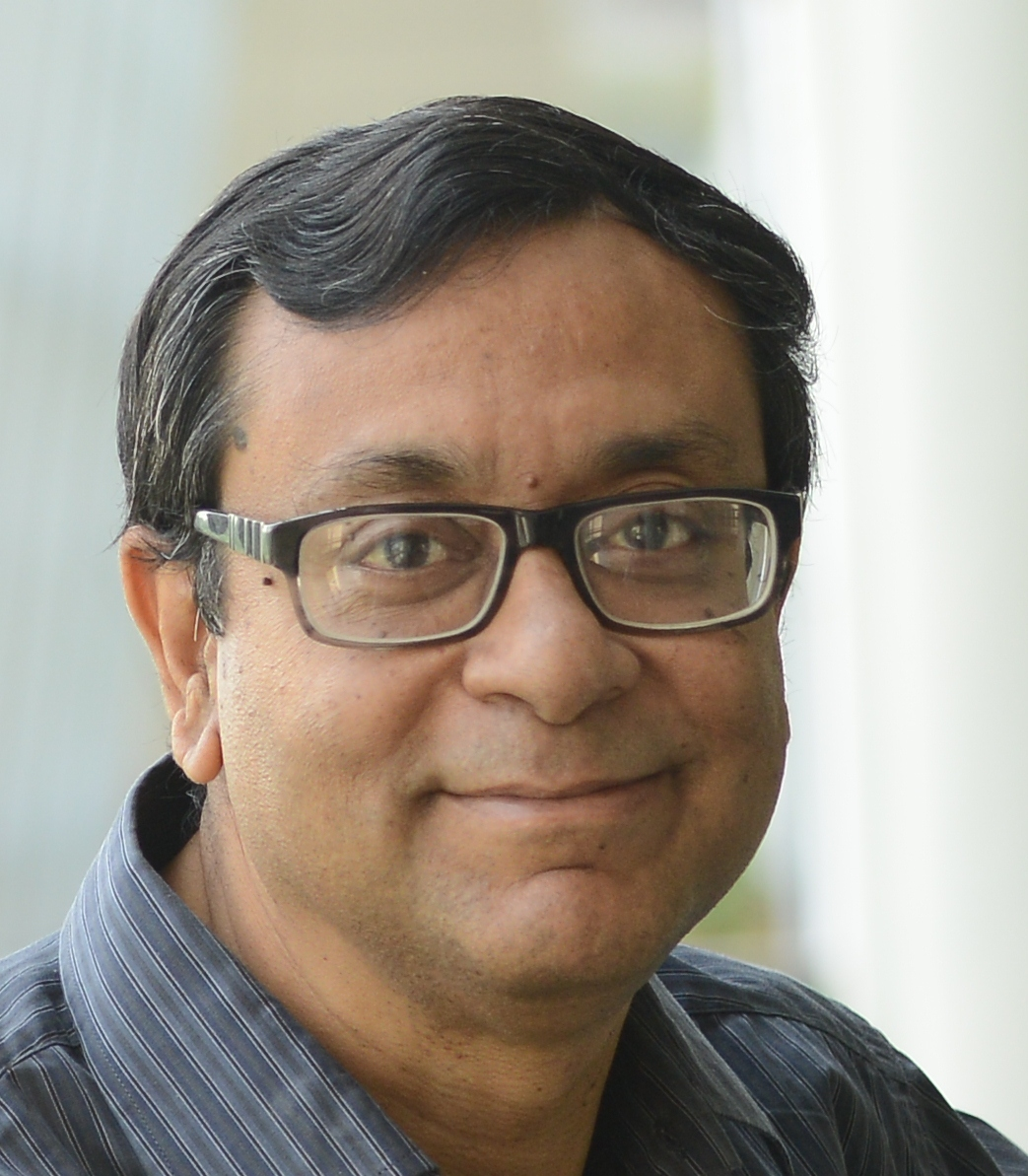
- Anindya Sen
- Born: 6 August 1955 (age 71); West Bengal (India)

Academic background
- Education: Presidency College, University of Calcutta, University of Southern California

Academic work
- Discipline: Economics
- Institutions: Indian Institute of Management Calcutta

Anindya Sen is a Professor of Economics at Indian Institute of Management Calcutta.

Sen received his B.A. degree from Presidency College, Kolkata, MA degree from the University of Calcutta, and Ph.D. from University of Southern California.

Before joining IIM Calcutta, Sen worked as a Lecturer of Economics at his alma-mater University of Calcutta, as a Professor and as Dean of Graduate Studies at Indira Gandhi Institute of Development Research, Mumbai, Jan 1992 - August 1993, August 1995 - September 1996.

At IIM Calcutta, Sen teaches several courses in Economics, including Microeconomics and Economics of Business Policy.

- Dean (Academic) 2012-2015. As Dean (Academic) he led the team that obtained the AMBA and AACSB accreditations for IIM Calcutta
- He was the Dean of Programme Initiatives at IIM-C from 2005 to 2007.
- At various times, he has served as Chairman, FRP Committee, Professor-in-charge, Publications Division, Editor of Decision (for four years) and Chairman, Computer Services Committee.
- Director in-charge, Indian Institute of Management, Ranchi, since 7 November 2014.
- Faculty Representative to the Board of Governors, IIM Calcutta, since April 2016.
- External member, Faculty Council of Arts, Jadavpur University.
- Member, Editorial Board of Studies for Microeconomics, Sage Publications.

Prof. Sen is the recipient of the Annual Prof.Panchanan Chakraborty Memorial Award for best teacher and researcher in economics in West Bengal for the year 2005, from Bangiya Arthaniti Parishad(Bengal Economic Association). He has won various academic awards from the Government of India, an All-University Pre-Doctoral Merit Fellowship from the University of Southern California and Merit Certificates from the Office of International Students and Scholars, University of Southern California.

== List of books ==
- N.S.S. Narayana and AnindyaSen (eds.), Poverty, Environment and Economic Development: Festschrift for Kirit S. Parikh, Interline Publishers, Bangalore, 1995.
- AnindyaSen (ed.), Readers in Economics: Industrial Organization, Oxford University Press, New Delhi, 1996.
- AnindyaSen, Microeconomics: Theory and Applications, Oxford University Press, New Delhi, 1999.
- SubirGokarn, AnindyaSen and Rajendra Vaidya (eds.), The Structure of Indian Industry. OUP, New Delhi, 2003.
- D.N. Sengupta andAnindyaSen: The Economics of Business Policy. OUP, New Delhi, 2004.
- AnindyaSen and P.K.Sett (eds.): Managing Business in the 21st Century. OUP, New Delhi, 2005.
- SudipChaudhuri and AnindyaSen, Indian Adaptation of Economics by Samuelson and Nordhaus. Tata McGraw-Hill, Mumbai, 2010.
- AnindyaSen, General Editor for a cluster of books on Economics and Development in the Oxford India Short Introduction series, 2012.

== Selected bibliography ==
- Sen, A (1998) "Industrial Organization", Oxford University Press ISBN 978-0-19-564433-3
- Sen, A (2000) "Microeconomics: Theory and Applications", Oxford University Press ISBN 978-0-19-565144-7
- Sengupta & Sen (2005) "Economics of Business Policy", Oxford University Press ISBN 978-0-19-567741-6
- Sen & Sett (2006) "Managing Business in the Twenty-first Century: A Handbook", Oxford University Press ISBN 978-0-19-566525-3
- Gokarn, Sen & Vaidya "The Structure of Indian Industry", Oxford University Press ISBN 978-0-19-564942-0
