= Adam Fforde =

Economist

Adam Fforde is a British economist specializing in Vietnam.

== Education ==
Born in London in 1953, he was educated at Westminster School and the University of Oxford. Changing his academic focus from Engineering to Economics, after an MSc at Birkbeck College, London, Fforde attained his Ph.D (with a thesis on 'Problems of Agricultural Development in North Vietnam') from Cambridge University in 1982.

== Career ==
He spent the 1980s and 1990s in Hanoi and Canberra advising on development practice for national aid agencies and NGOs operating in South-East Asia.

Accepting a Fellowship in 1999 at the National University of Singapore, Fforde subsequently held a number of academic posts in Melbourne, Australia. He is currently among the most widely cited academics writing on contemporary Vietnam, as well as the author of textbooks and critical works on the theory and methodology of development practice. He has also published on the issue of servicisation in developing countries.

He is an Honorary Professorial Fellow at the Asia Institute of the University of Melbourne and adjunct professor at Victoria University's Centre for Strategic Economic Studies.

== Personal life ==
Fforde is the eldest son of John Fforde (1921-2000), a senior figure in the Bank of England, and the brother of British novelist Jasper Fforde (born 1961) and Professor Cressida Fforde (born 1969). He is married with four children and currently lives in Melbourne, Australia.

== Bibliography ==
- Reinventing ‘development’ – the sceptical change agent, New York: Palgrave-MacMillan 2017.
- Understanding development economics: its challenge to development studies, 2013, London: Routledge
- Coping with facts – a skeptic’s guide to the problem of development, 2009, Bloomfield, CT: Kumarian Press.
- Vietnamese State Industry and the Political Economy of Commercial Renaissance: Dragon's tooth or curate's egg? 2007 Oxford: Chandos
- The Agrarian Question in North Vietnam 1974-79: a study of cooperator resistance to State policy, 1989, New York: M.E.Sharpe ISBN 0873324862
- From Plan to Market: The Economic Transition in Vietnam, Boulder CO: Westview, 1996. ASIN: 0813326834. (co-authored with Stefan de Vylder)
- Vietnam - an economy in transition, 1988, Stockholm: SIDA (ISBN n/a). (co-authored with Stefan de Vylder)
- The Limits of National Liberation - problems of economic management in the Democratic Republic of Vietnam, with a Statistical Appendix, 1987, London: Croom-Helm. ISBN 0709910363. (co-authored with Suzanne H. Paine)
