= Suzy Paine =

British academic economist (1946–1985)

Suzanne Helen Paine (10 March 1946 – 10 November 1985) was a British economist. She was lecturer at the University of Cambridge, UK and a Fellow of Clare and Girton colleges.

Her subject area was development economics, particularly in the countries of Turkey, Japan, India, and China. She supported economics to have a social purpose, along with rigorous analysis. She was a founder member of the editorial board of Cambridge Journal of Economics. Among her doctoral students was Abhijit Sen. Her work continued to be cited into the twenty-first century.

The Suzy Paine Fund was established in her memory to fund travel to Asia relevant to their studies for students in the subject area of political economy.

== Publications ==
She was the author or co-author of several books and articles, including:

- Adam Fforde and Suzanne H. Paine (1987) The Limits of National Liberation: Problems of Economic Management in the Democratic Republic of Vietnam, with a Statistical Appendix Routledge, London pp 268 ISBN 9781003243717
- Suzanne Paine (1981) Spatial aspects of Chinese development: Issues, outcomes and policies 1949–79. The Journal of Development Studies volume 17 issue 2 pp. 133-195
- Suzanne Paine (1976) Balanced development: Maoist conception and Chinese practice. World Development volume 4 issue 4 pp. 277-304
- Suzanne H. Paine (1971) Wage Differentials in the Japanese Manufacturing Sector. Oxford Economic Papers New Series, volume 23, issue 2 pp. 212-238
