= Hari Keshab Sen =

- হরিকেশব সেন
- Born: 9 February 1905
- Died: 1 September 1976 (aged 71)
- Education: Allahabad University; Harvard University
- Known for: Sen-Wyller magneto-ionic theory (1960)
- Scientific career
- Fields: Physics; Astronomy
- Workplaces: Harvard College Observatory; Air Force Research Laboratory; Hughes Aircraft Company; National Institute of Standards and Technology

Hari Keshab Sen (9 February, 1905 - 1 September, 1976), popularly known as H. K. Sen was an Indian Bengali scientist, astrophysicist. He was known for the Sen-Wyller magneto-ionic theory, which is a generalisation of the standard Appleton-Hartree formula for radio wave propagation through a weakly ionized gas in a magnetic field. The Sen-Wyller magneto-ionic theory was discovered in 1960 by Hari Keshab Sen and A. A. Wyller.

== Biography ==
After completing his early education, H. K. Sen received his doctorate in astrophysics from Allahabad University in 1943. Then receiving an Aggasiz Research Fellowship to Harvard University in 1947 he went to US. From 1948 to 1951, Sen was a lecturer in astronomy at the Harvard College Observatory. There he worked with Donald H. Menzel on astrophysical problems. Sen stayed from 1951 to 1954 as a physicist at the National Bureau of Standards in Boulder. Before joining the Air Force Cambridge Research Laboratory in 1955, Sen served as a senior scientist of Hughes Aircraft Co. in 1954–55. In 1959 he became a research associate at the Harvard College Observatory.

== Research ==
In the Air Force Cambridge Research Laboratory, Sen associated with A. A. Wyller and discovered the magneto-ionic theory in 1960. His theory explains the measured refraction, absorption and reflection properties of radio waves in and from the ionospheric D layers. Sen researched nonlinear oscillations of a Maxwellian plasma with Pradip M. Bakshi of Brandeis University, Massachusetts. They obtained exact non-linear wave solutions for stationary waves in a uniformly moving frame for the case of a Maxwellian electron plasma in a uniform ion background. It is found that there are no waves below a minimum wave velocity; anharmonic waves develop above a certain velocity, but only up to a maximum amplitude, depending on the wave velocity.
