= Pabitra Kumar Sen =

Pabitra Kumar Sen (15 May 1906, Comilla, British India,- 15 September 1997 Calcutta) was the Khaira Professor of Agriculture, Calcutta University, and founder of the College of Agriculture at Calcutta University in the 1950s.

Sen obtained his doctoral degree from the Imperial College in London, England in the 1920s and served as plant physiologist and horticulturist under the British India government during the 1930s in Sabore, Bihar, India. He was invited by Syama Prasad Mookerjee to start a college of Agriculture under Calcutta University. He accepted the position of Khaira Professor of Agriculture, Calcutta University in March, 1948. He was highly influenced by Gandhi and Tagore and worked on village reconstruction in Santiniketan during the 1940s. He founded Seva-Bharati, in the village of Kapgari, Midnapur, West Bengal in 1948 as an experiment of applying education to elevate the living conditions of the very poor. Sen started with Kapgari, one of the poorest villages in India, and created schools ranging from nursery school up through research centers. Sen wrote a research article about several interesting developmental projects in the area in a paper entitled The village situation in India and reorganisation of its agricultural resources: A case study, published in Agricultural Administration, Elsevier.
