= Abhijit Sen =

Indian economist (1950–2022)

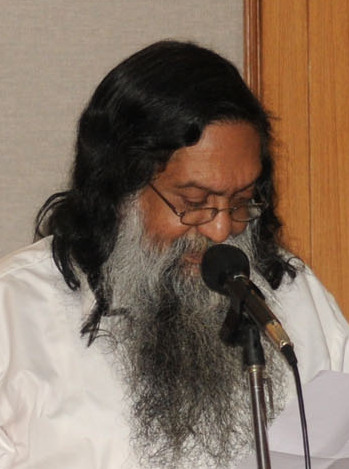
- Sen in 2009
- Born: 18 November 1950; Jamshedpur, Bihar, India (now in Jharkhand, India)
- Died: 29 August 2022 (aged 71); New Delhi, India
- Occupations: Professor; economist
- Spouse: Jayati Ghosh

Academic background
- Education: St. Stephen's College, Delhi; Trinity Hall, Cambridge (PhD)
- Thesis: The Agrarian Constraint to Economic Development: The Case of India
- Doctoral advisor: Suzy Paine

Abhijit Sen (18 November 1950 – 29 August 2022) was an Indian economist who focused on studying rural development. Sen was appointed to the Planning Commission of India between 2004 and 2014 and held a number of policy making positions in India. Amongst his works included recommendations toward establishment of minimum support price for farm produce and a universal public distribution system. Sen was a recipient of the Padma Bhushan, India's third highest civilian honor, in 2010.

== Early life ==
Sen was born on 18 November 1950 into a Bengali Baidya family in Jamshedpur, in the present-day Indian state of Jharkhand. His father Samar Sen was an economist with the World Bank. The family moved to New Delhi, where Sen studied at Sardar Patel Vidyalaya and later at St. Stephen's College where he studied for a physics honours degree. He later went to the University of Cambridge and obtained a PhD in economics in 1981 as a member of Trinity Hall, with a thesis titled "The agrarian constraint to economic development: the case of India" written under the supervision of Suzy Paine.

== Career ==
Sen started his career teaching at many of the universities in the UK, including those at University of Sussex, Oxford University, University of Cambridge, and the University of Essex, before returning to New Delhi to teach at the Jawaharlal Nehru University (JNU). In 1985, he moved to the university's Center for Economic Studies and Planning.

=== Public policy ===
Sen was appointed by the United Front government in 1997 to lead the Commission on Agricultural Costs and Prices (CACP). The commission studied the cost structures of various agricultural products and was tasked with setting the Minimum Support Price (MSP) for farm produce. Sen was also the chairman of a number of official Commissions, including the High Level Committee on Long Term Grain Policy, Commission for Agricultural Costs and Prices, the Tenth Plan Subgroup on Agricultural Economics and Rural Development. Sen's work computed MSP based on not only direct costs of producing the grains, but also included indirect costs like unpaid family labor, opportunity costs from rent and interest lost on owned land, as well as capital asset costs. This recommendation was captured in the eventual 'Swaminathan Formula' that was adopted to compute the MSP costs which pegged MSP at 50% higher than direct production costs.

Sen was first appointed to the Planning Commission during the United Progressive Alliance government under Manmohan Singh in 2004 and was re-appointed for a second five-year term from 2009 to 2014. He was also a member of the State Planning Boards of West Bengal and Tripura, PM's Taskforce on Agricultural Economics and Rural Development, and the Expert Committee on Rural Credit. Sen's recommendations included the establishment of a universal Public Distribution System (PDS) that eliminated categorization of poverty lines as determinants of grains and instead had the central government fix the uniform prices of rice, wheat and other grains. This was the basis for the then central government's disbursal of wheat and rice at ₹2 and ₹3 per kilogram, respectively. As an advocate of the universal PDS system, Sen maintained that the cost of food subsidies was overstated and that a country like India could afford both a universal PDS system providing food grains at an affordable rate to its population, while also providing a minimum support price to its farmers.

Sen also was adviser and consultant with international organisations, such as the United Nations' Development Programme, Food and Agriculture Organization and World Institute for Development Economics Research, International Labour Organization, OECD Development Centre, International Fund for Agricultural Development, and the Asian Development Bank.

Sen received the Padma Bhushan, India's third highest civilian award, for public service in 2010.

== Personal life ==
Sen was married to economist Jayati Ghosh whom he met at the JNU. The couple had a daughter named Jahnavi Sen, a journalist with The Wire.

Sen had a heart attack and died in New Delhi on 29 August 2022, at the age of 71.

== Select published works ==
- Nayyar, Deepak; Sen, Abhijit (1994). "International Trade and the Agricultural Sector in India". Economic and Political Weekly. 29 (20): 1187–1203. ISSN 0012-9976. JSTOR 4401202.
- Sen, Abhijit (1981). "Market failure and control of labour power: towards an explanation of 'structure' and change in Indian agriculture. Part 1". Cambridge Journal of Economics. 5 (3): 201–228. doi:10.1093/oxfordjournals.cje.a035482. ISSN 0309-166X. JSTOR 23596613.
- Sen, Abhijit (1996). "Economic Reforms, Employment and Poverty: Trends and Options". Economic and Political Weekly. 31 (35/37): 2459–2477. ISSN 0012-9976. JSTOR 4404565.
- Sen, Abhijit; Himanshu (2004). "Poverty and Inequality in India: I". Economic and Political Weekly. 39 (38): 4247–4263. ISSN 0012-9976. JSTOR 4415560.
- Kumar, AK Shiva; Chen, Lincoln C.; Choudhury, Mita; Ganju, Shiban; Mahajan, Vijay; Sinha, Amarjeet; Sen, Abhijit (2011). "Financing health care for all: challenges and opportunities". The Lancet. 377 (9766): 668–679. doi:10.1016/S0140-6736(10)61884-3. ISSN 0140-6736. PMID 21227490. S2CID 9881251.
- Sen, Abhijit (2000). "Estimates of Consumer Expenditure and Its Distribution: Statistical Priorities after NSS 55th Round". Economic and Political Weekly. 35 (51): 4499–4518. ISSN 0012-9976. JSTOR 4410083.
- Sen, Abhijit (2011). Including the Excluded: The Real Challenge of Indian Planning. Centre for Social Welfare Administration and Administration of Justice, Indian Institute of Public Administration.
