= Krishna Sen =

Nepalese writer and journalist(1956–2002)

Krishna Sen Ichhuk
- Born: 19 October 1956; Dehradun, India
- Died: 27 May 2002 (aged 45); Mahendra Police Club Kathmandu
- Occupation: Journalism

Krishna Sen (Ichhuk) (19 October 1956 – 27 May 2002) was a writer and journalist of Nepal.

Sen was the editor of Janadesh, a pro-Maoist vernacular weekly newspaper. He was arrested by police on May 20, 2002, under the provisions of a sweeping anti-terrorism ordinance introduced in November 2001 that criminalized any contact with or support for Maoist rebels. He was reportedly detained incommunicado at an unknown location following his arrest and subjected to torture, which reportedly led to his death while in detention. He was killed in police custody during the Maoist insurgency in Nepal. Local human rights group Informal Sector Service Center (INSEC) has reported that Sen was held for approximately one week and died after being tortured at the Mahendra Police Club in Kathmandu. His body has never been found.

Communist Party of Nepal (Maoist) has established its online news portal in memory of Krishna Sen as Krishnasen Online.

== Biography ==
Sen was born in India on 19 October 1956. His father served for Indian Army. His mother was Bhim Kumari and father was Yam Bahadur Sen. He was raised in India to the age of six. In 2019 BS (1962-1963) he returned Nepal and studied Adarsha Secondary School of Deukhuri of Dang district. Sen's ancestral home was at Sarangkot in Pyuthan district, they migrated to Jaluke in Arghakhanchi District before he was born. He passed tenth grade from Saraswati High School in 2032 BS (1975-1976). He passed Intermediate in Arts from India as a private student.

He took part in the student's movement of 2036 BS against the Panchayat System for which he was arrested. He again became active in student movements and was arrested in 2039 BS (1982-1983) and jailed for five and half years. He was set free only in 2047 BS. After being free he rejoined Tribhuwan University and passed his Bachelors of Education.

Sen was married to Takma KC in 2048 BS and had a daughter named Samikchhya.

=== Political membership ===
- In 2034 BS (1977-1978), Sen joined Communist Party
- In 2045 BS (1988-1989), he was elected as the Central Committee Coordinator of All Nepal National Free Students Union (ANNFSU).
- In 2047 BS (1990-1991), he was promoted to the secretary of Rapti Zone Regional Bureau of Communist Party.
- Sen also became the Central Committee Member of Unified Jana Morcha Nepal and the president of Akhil Nepal Jana Sanskritik Sangh (All Nepal People's Cultural Association), Central Committee Member of Pragatisheel Lekhak Sangh (Progressive Writers Association), member of Federation of Journalists, member of South Asian Regional Journalist Association and member of Jana Adhikar Sarokar Abhiyan (People's Welfare Concerned Movement).

After Maoists declared the civil war in 2052 BS (1995-1996) and started to work form exile.

== Literary contributions ==
Sen's first poem was titled Bholi Prati (For Tomorrow) which was published in Matribhumi Sapthahik in 2033 BS. Other publications includes:

- A melancholy epic that he wrote in jail was published in 2048 BS.
- A collection of poems written between 2038 and 2055 BS were published as a book in 2056 BS (1999-2000)with title ‘Itihaasko Yas Ghadima (In this moment of history)’
- Bandi Ra Chandragiri (Prisoner and Chandragiri mountain), a poem collection was published in 2058 BS.
- Parkhal Bhitraka Banda Aawazharu (Sounds imprisoned inside wall) (unpublished)

== Honours ==
Sen has received following awards:

- Sahitya-Sandhya Puraskar 2057 BS (2000-2001)
- Shrasta Puraskar 2058 BS (2001-2002)
- Sahitya Sangam Chitwan Samman 2058 BS (2001-2002)
- Pragatisheel Lekhak Sangh Nepal Samman 2059 BS (2002-2003)
- Praijat Sirjan Puraskar 2059 BS (2002-2003)
- Krishna Mani Sahitya Puraskar 2058 BS (2001-2002)
- Netralal Abhagi Samman 2060 for his contribution to journalism (2060 BS (2003-2004)
- Pragatisheel Sahityik Puraskar 2061 BS (2004-2005)
- Rastriya Patrakarita Puraskar (National Journalism Award) 2061 BS (2004-2005)
- Press Swatantra Senani (Press Freedom Fighter) 2064 BS (2007-2008)

== See also ==
- List of kidnappings
