= University of Calcutta =

Public university in Kolkata, West Bengal, India

- Seal of the University of Calcutta
- Latin: Universitas Calcuttensis
- Motto: Augmentum doctrinae (Latin)
- Motto in English: Advancement of Learning
- Recognition: AICTE; BCI
- Type: Public research university
- Established: 24 January 1857; 169 years ago
- Founders: Council of Directors
- Accreditation: NAAC
- Academic affiliations: UGC; AIU; ACU
- Budget: ₹340.73 crore (US$36 million) (FY2025–26 est.)
- Chancellor: Governor of West Bengal
- Vice-Chancellor: Ashutosh Ghosh
- Academic staff: 1,185
- Students: 14,484 (2025/26)
- Undergraduates: 2,349 (2025/26)
- Postgraduates: 9,430 (2025/26)
- Doctoral students: 2,705 (2025/26)
- Location: University of Calcutta, 87/1, College Street, Kolkata-700 073; 22°34′30″N 88°21′46″E
- Campus: Metropolis 119.7 acres (48.4 ha)
- Acronym: CU
- Journal: Calcutta Review
- Colours: Dark blue, Light blue, white
- Website: www.caluniv.ac.in

Shubho Karmapathe
- University song 1937: file; help

The University of Calcutta, informally known as Calcutta University (CU), is a public state research university located in Kolkata, also known as Calcutta, in West Bengal, India. It has 151 affiliated undergraduate colleges and 16 institutes in Kolkata and nearby areas. It was established on 24 January 1857 and is the oldest multidisciplinary university of the Indian Subcontinent and the Southeast Asian Region. Today, the university's jurisdiction is limited to a few districts of West Bengal, but at the time of its establishment, it had a catchment area ranging from Kabul to Myanmar. It is accredited as an "A" grade university by the National Assessment and Accreditation Council (NAAC).

The university has a total of fourteen campuses spread over the city of Kolkata and its suburbs. Since 2020, 151 colleges and 21 institutes, and centres have been affiliated with CU. The university was fourth in the Indian University Ranking 2021 list, released by the National Institutional Ranking Framework of the Ministry of Education.

Its alumni and faculty include several heads of state and government, social reformers, prominent artists, the only Indian Dirac Medal winner, many Fellows of the Royal Society, and six Nobel laureates as of 2025. The Nobel laureates associated with this university are Ronald Ross, Rabindranath Tagore, C. V. Raman, Amartya Sen, and Abhijit Banerjee.

The university has the highest number of students who have cleared the National Eligibility Test. The University of Calcutta is a member of the United Nations Academic Impact.

== History ==
=== Pre-independence ===
Frederic J. Mouat, the education secretary to the British Government of India, first tendered a proposal to them in London for the establishment of a university in Calcutta, along the lines of London University. In July 1854, the Court of Directors of the East India Company sent a dispatch, known as Wood's despatch, to the Governor General of India in Council, to establish universities in Calcutta, Madras, and Bombay.

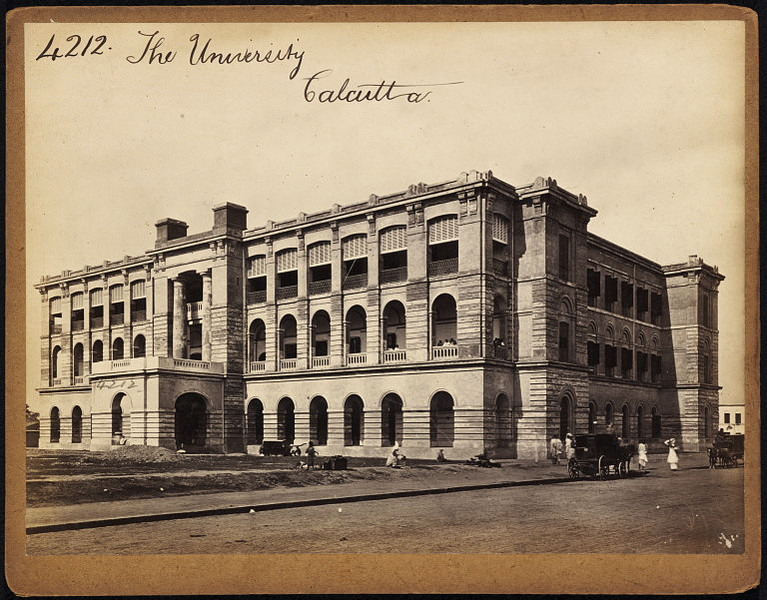
The University of Calcutta in the late nineteenth century, by Francis Frith

The Calcutta University Act came into force on 24 January 1857, and a 41-member Senate was formed as the policy-making body of the university. The land for the establishment of the university was given by Maharaja Maheshwar Singh Bahadur, who was the Maharaja of Darbhanga. When the university was first established, it had a jurisdiction from Kabul to Rangoon and Ceylon, the largest of any Indian university. Calcutta University was the first university east of Suez to teach European classics, English literature, European and Indian philosophy and Occidental and Oriental history. The first medical school in British India, the Calcutta Medical College, was affiliated with the university in 1857. The first college for women in India, Bethune College, is also affiliated with the university.

From 1836 to 1890, Government Science College, Jabalpur, the first Indian science college, was affiliated with the University of Calcutta. The first university library began functioning in the 1870s. Bankim Chandra Chattopadhyay and Joddu Nath Bose became the first graduates of the university in 1858, and Kadambini Ganguly and Chandramukhi Basu were the first Indian female graduates in 1882. The first chancellor and vice-chancellor of the Calcutta University were Governor General Lord Canning and Chief Justice of the Supreme Court, Sir William Colvile, respectively. Ashutosh Mukherjee was the vice-chancellor for four consecutive two-year terms (1906–1914) and a fifth two-year term in 1921–1923.

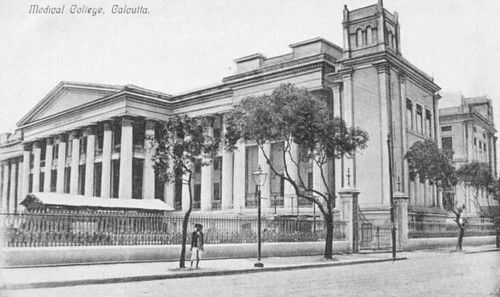
Calcutta Medical College in 1910

Initially, the university was only an affiliating and examining body. All the academic and teaching work was done in constituent colleges, which were the Presidency College, the Scottish Church College, the Sanskrit College, and the Bengal Engineering College. During that period, the Council Room of the Calcutta Medical College and the private residence of the vice-chancellor used to house the Senate meetings. The faculty councils generally met at the residences of the presidents of the faculties concerned, in the Civil Engineering College, or in the Writers' Building. Because of the lack of space, university examinations were conducted in the Kolkata Town Hall and in tents in the Maidan urban park.

In 1866, a grant of ₹81,600 (equivalent to ₹41 million or US$440,000 in 2026) for the site and ₹170,561 (equivalent to ₹85 million or US$910,000 in 2026) was sanctioned to construct the new building on College Street. It opened in 1873 and was called Senate House. It had meeting halls for the Senate, a chamber for the vice-chancellor, the office of the registrar, examination rooms, and lecture halls. In 1904, postgraduate teaching and research began at the university, which led to an increase in the number of students and candidates. After almost sixty years, a second building, known as the Darbhanga Building, was erected in 1912 with a donation of ₹2.5 lakh (equivalent to ₹8.4 crore or US$900,000 in 2026) from Maharaja Maheshwar Singh Bahadur.

The Darbhanga Building housed the University Law College, its library and some university offices and afforded space to hold university examinations on its top floor. In the same year, the Government of British India granted a sum of ₹8 lakh (equivalent to ₹27 crore or US$2.9 million in 2026) for the acquisition of a market, Madhab Babu's Bazar, situated adjacent to the Senate House, and construction of a new building for the teaching departments began. It opened in 1926 and was later named the Asutosh Building, after Asutosh Mukherjee, vice-chancellor of the university in 1906–1914. Between 1912 and 1914, Taraknath Palit and Rash Behari Ghosh, two eminent lawyers, donated assets totalling ₹25 lakh (equivalent to ₹73 crore or US$7.8 million in 2026), and founded the University College of Science at Upper Circular Road (now known as Acharya Prafulla Chandra Road).

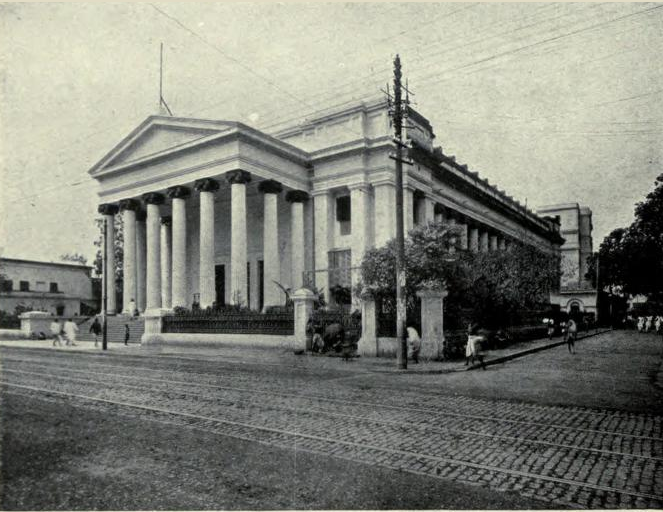
Senate Hall of University of Calcutta, early 1910s

=== Post-independence ===
Before the partition of India, twenty-seven colleges from East Bengal (now Bangladesh) were affiliated with the university. The Government of West Bengal passed the Calcutta University Act of 1951, which substituted the earlier act of 1904 and ensured a democratic structure for the university. The West Bengal Secondary Education Act was passed in the same year, linking the university with the school leaving examination. Gradually, the requirements of the university grew, and the Senate House was becoming incapable of handling them. After the centenary of Calcutta University, the building was demolished to make space for a more utilitarian building. In 1957, the university's centenary year, it received a grant of ₹1 crore (equivalent to ₹110 crore or US$12 million in 2026) from the University Grants Commission, which aided in the construction of the Centenary Building on the College Street campus and the Law College Building on Hazra Road campus. The Economics Department got its own building in 1958 near Barrackpore Trunk Road. In 1965, the Goenka Hospital Diagnostic Research Centre for the University College of Medicine was opened as the university health service. Until 1960, Senate House was one of the city's most prominent landmarks.

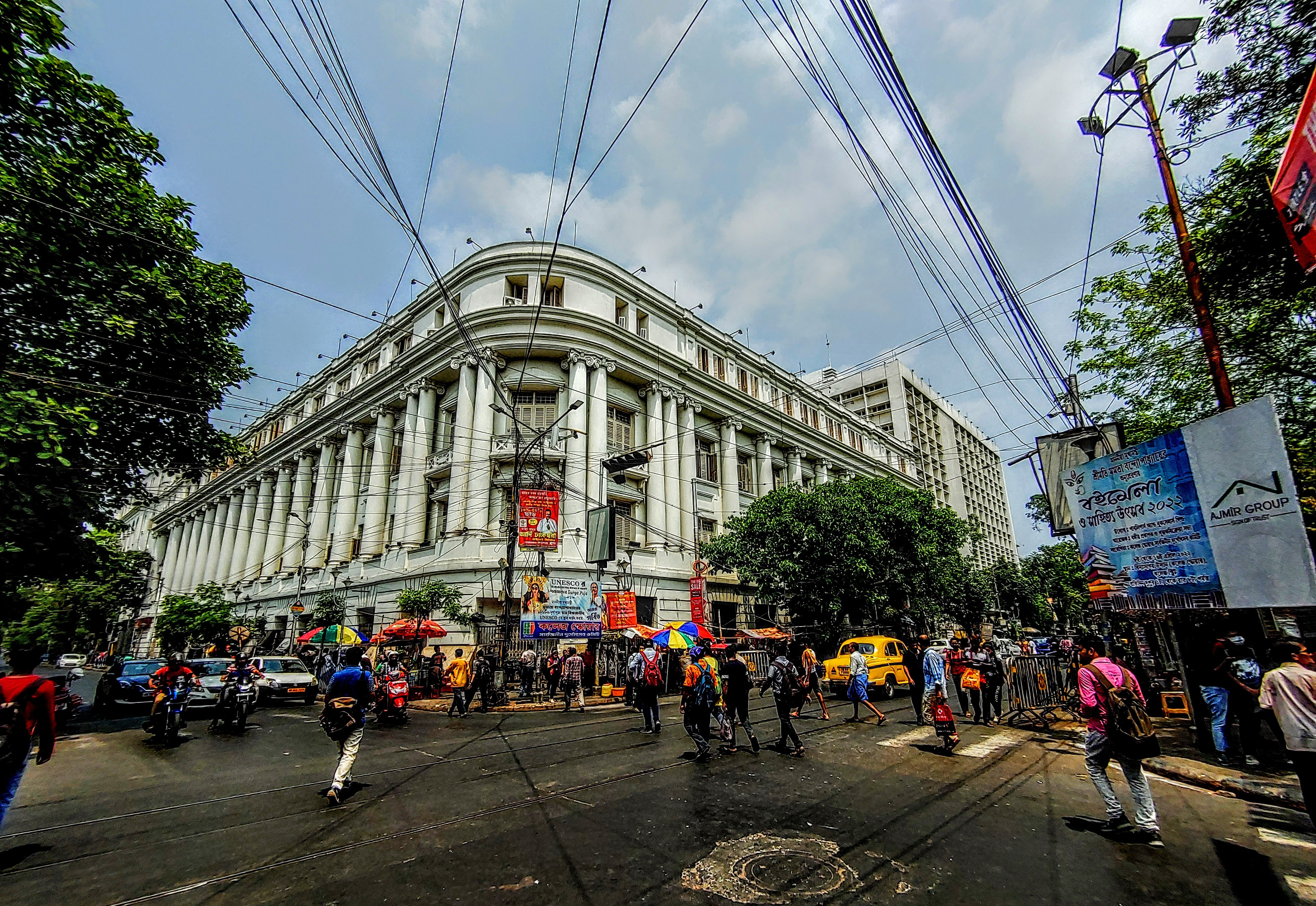
The University of Calcutta building on College Street

In 1968, the Centenary Building opened on the former location of the Senate House. Currently, it houses the Central Library, the Asutosh Museum of Indian Art, the centenary auditorium and a number of university offices. By the mid-1970s, it had become one of the largest universities in the world. It had 13 colleges under its direct control and more than 150 affiliated colleges, along with 16 postgraduate faculties. In the year 2001, the University of Calcutta was awarded the 'Five-Star' status in the first cycle of the university's accreditation by the National Assessment and Accreditation Council (NAAC). In 2009 and 2017, the NAAC awarded its highest grade of 'A' to the University of Calcutta in the second and third cycles of the university's accreditation. In 2019, the university's central library and 40 departmental libraries were opened to the public. They have over one million books and more than 200,000 journals, proceedings and manuscripts.

== Seal ==
The seal has changed multiple times over the years. The first seal dates back to 1857. It was changed when the Government of India Act 1858 was passed by the British parliament. This brought the government and territories of the East India Company, including the University of Calcutta, under the British Crown. Seals three, four and five were introduced in the 1930s; the fourth seal faced criticism locally. The current university seal is the modified version of the sixth seal. The motto Advancement of Learning has remained the same through the seal's transitions.

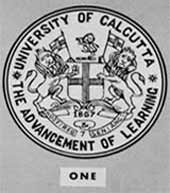
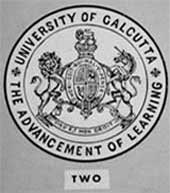
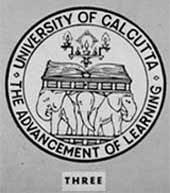
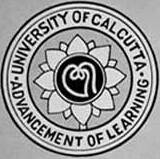
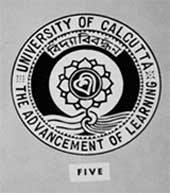
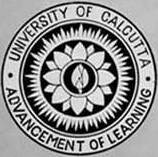
Evolution of seals

== Campuses ==
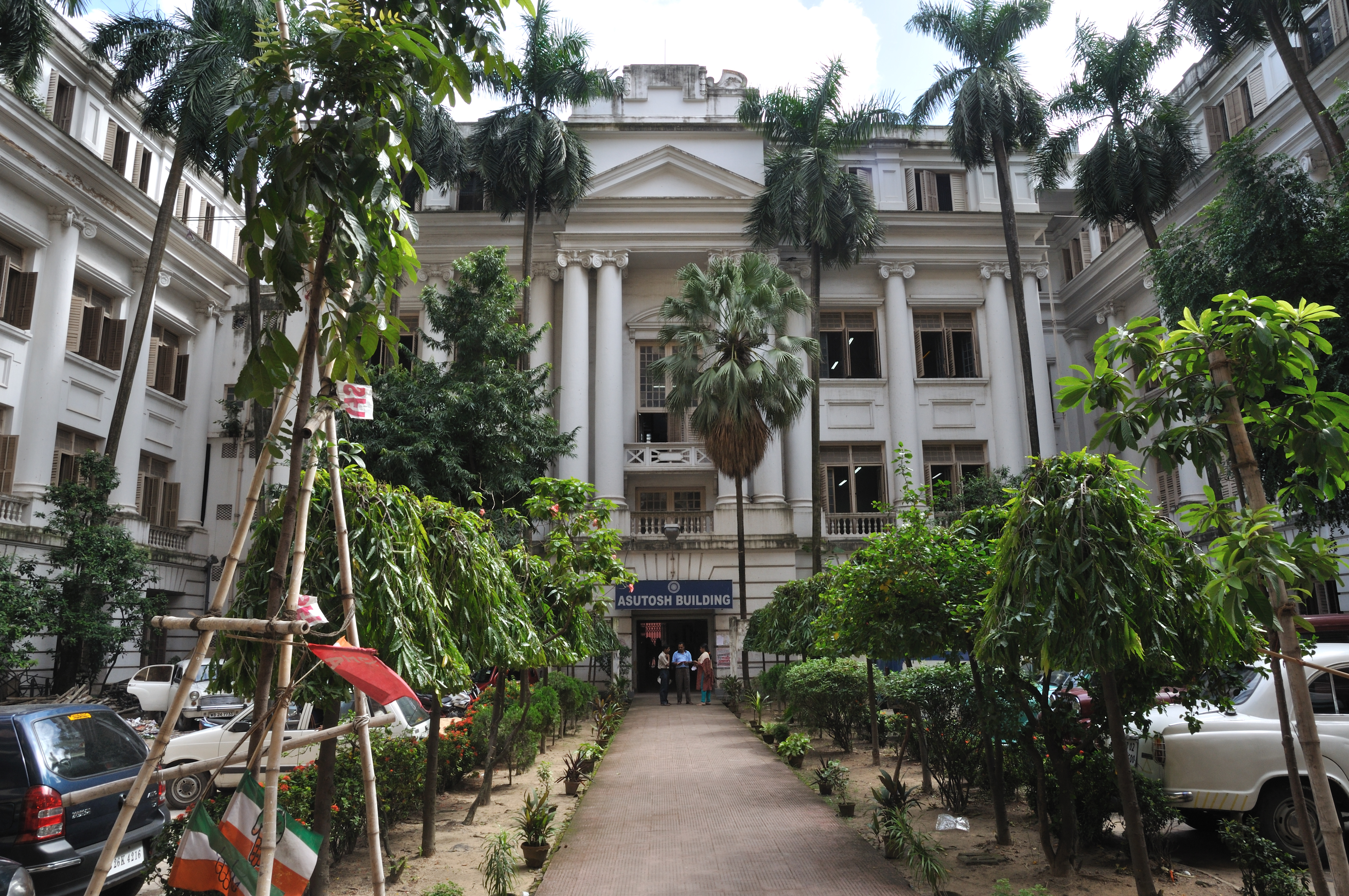
Ashutosh Building at the College Street campus

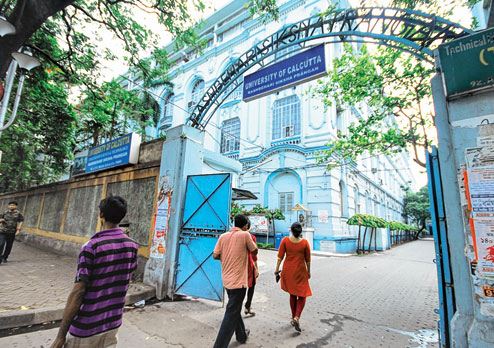
Rajabazar Campus, Kolkata

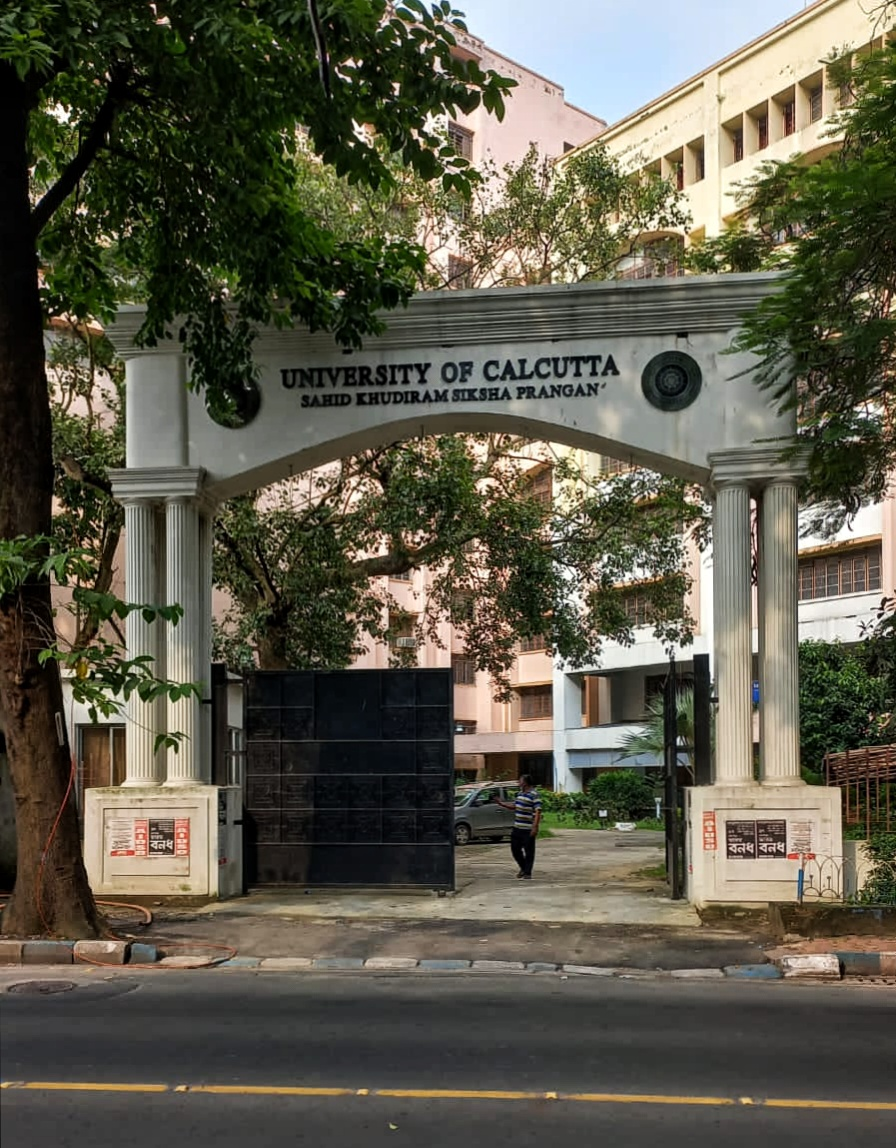
Sahid Khudiram Siksha Prangan or Alipore campus.

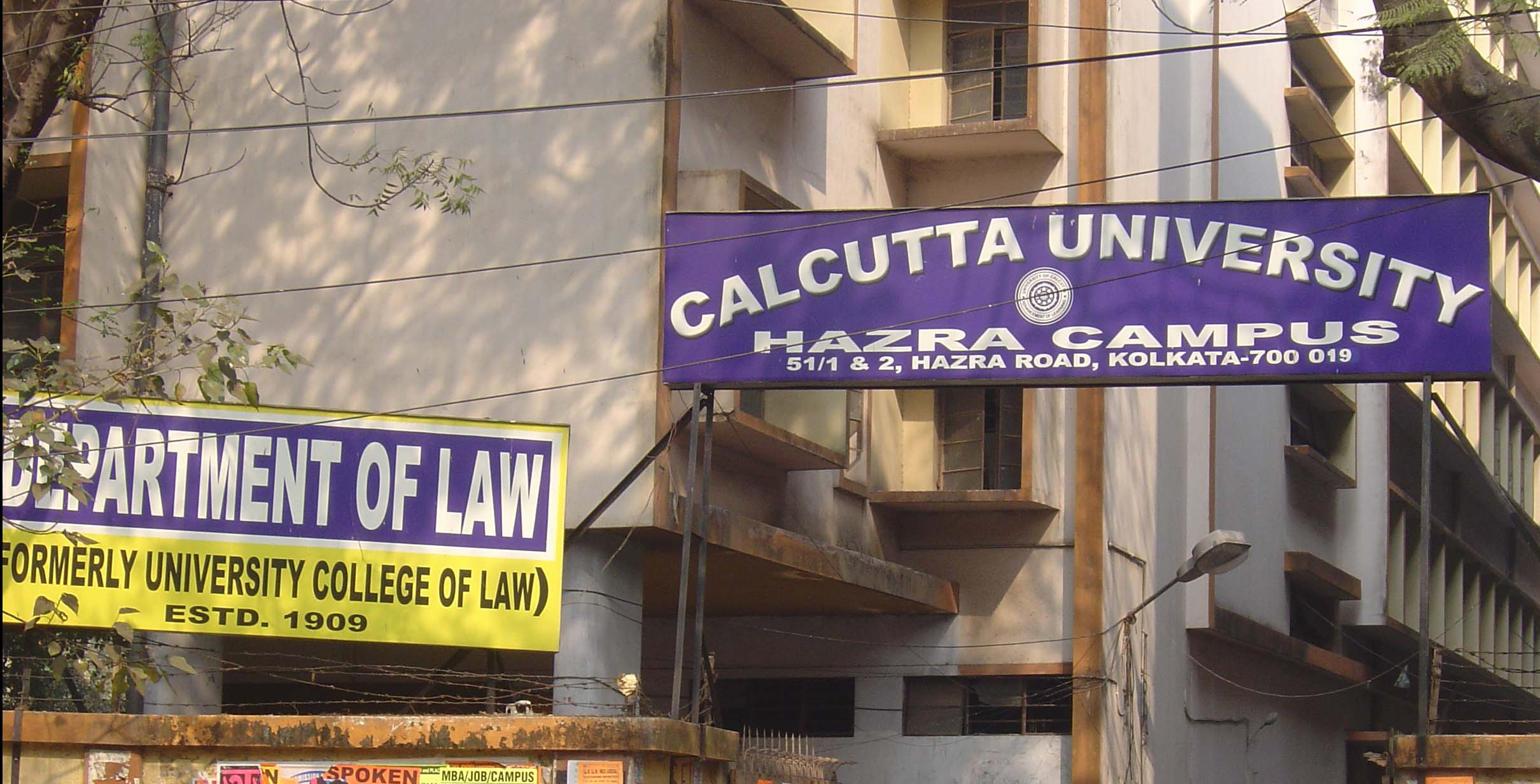
Hazra Campus, Kolkata

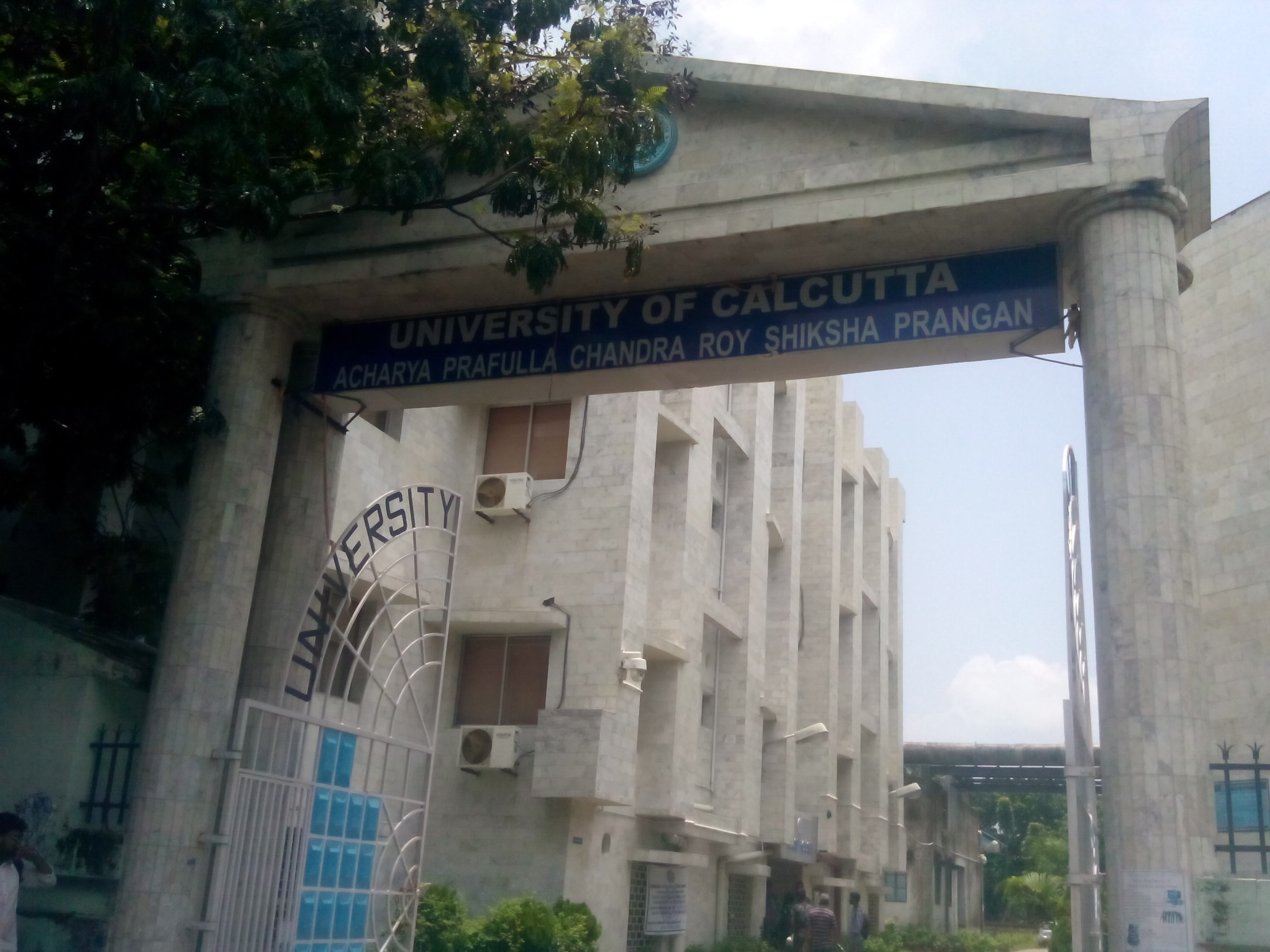
Technology Campus, Salt Lake

The university has a total of 14 campuses spread over the city of Kolkata and its suburbs. They are referred to as Sikhsa Prangan, which means education premises. Major campuses include the Central Campus (Ashutosh Shiksha Prangan) on College Street, University College of Science, Technology and Agriculture (Rashbehari Shiksha Prangan or Rajabazar Science College or Science College) in Rajabazar, Taraknath Palit Shiksha Prangan in Ballygunge and Sahid Khudiram Siksha Prangan in Alipore. Other campuses include the Hazra Road Campus, the University Press and Book Depot, the B. T. Road Campus, the Viharilal College of Home Science Campus, the University Health Service, the Haringhata Campus, the Dhakuria Lakes (University Rowing Club) and the University Ground and Tent at Maidan.

=== Asutosh Siksha Prangan ===
Asutosh Siksha Prangan (commonly called the College Street Campus) is the university's main campus where the administrative work is done. Located on College Street, it is spread over an area of 2.7 acres (1.1 ha). It houses the Arts and Language department, administrative offices, a museum, the central library, an auditorium etc. Exhibits like folk art of Bengal are present in the Asutosh Museum of Indian Art. Senate House was the first university building situated on this campus; it opened in 1872. In 1960, it was demolished to make way for a larger building, the Centenary Building, which opened in 1968. The Darbhanga Building and the Asutosh Building are the two other buildings opened in 1921 and 1926, respectively.

=== Rashbehari Siksha Prangan ===
Rashbehari Siksha Prangan (also known as University College of Science and Technology or more commonly Rajabazar Science College), is located on Acharya Prafulla Chandra Road in Rajabazar. Established in 1914, it houses several scientific and technological departments, including pure and applied chemistry, pure and applied physics, applied optics and photonics, radio physics, applied mathematics, psychology, physiology, biophysics, molecular biology, and others.

=== Taraknath Palit Siksha Prangan ===
Taraknath Palit Siksha Prangan (also known as University College of Science or commonly Ballygunge Science College) on Ballygunge Circular Road in the southern part of the city, houses the departments of agriculture, anthropology, biochemistry, microbiology, botany, geography, genetics, statistics, zoology, neuroscience, marine science, biotechnology, and most notably geology, among others. It also houses S. N. Pradhan Centre For Neurosciences and the Institute of Agricultural Science.

=== Sahid Khudiram Siksha Prangan ===
Sahid Khudiram Siksha Prangan, commonly known as Alipore Campus, located in Alipore, is the humanities campus of the university. The departments of history, ancient Indian history and culture, Islamic history and culture, South and Southeast Asian studies, archaeology, political science, business management and museology are situated on this campus.

=== Technology Campus ===
The Technology Campus, also known as the Tech Campus, is the newest on the university. It brings together the three engineering and technical departments: The Centre for Research in Nanoscience and Nanotechnology, the Department of Computer Science and Engineering, the A.K.C. School of Information Technology and the Department of Applied Optics and Photonics, in Sector 3, JD Block, Salt Lake.

Map of the University of Calcutta campuses

== Organisation and administration ==
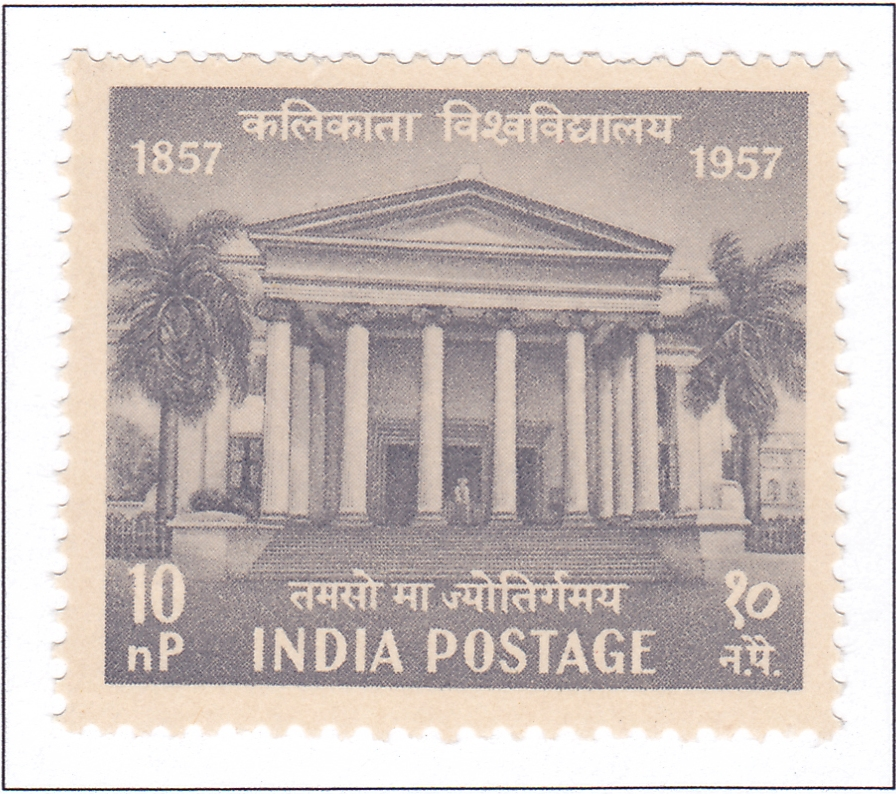
Commemorative Postal Stamp, 1957

=== Governance ===
The university is governed by a board of administrative officers, which includes the vice-chancellor, pro-vice-chancellor for academic affairs, pro-vice-chancellor for business affairs and finance, the registrar, the university librarian, the inspector of colleges, the system manager and 35 others. They monitor the operation of the university and its affiliated colleges and the university's funding. The university is funded by the University Grants Commission, the Government of West Bengal, other agencies for various research works and by the university's own initiatives like fees, sales proceeds, publications and service charges generated from endowment funds.

=== Jurisdiction ===
At one time, the university had a huge catchment area in British India, ranging from Lahore in the west to Rangoon in the east and Ceylon in the south. Colleges like Thomason Engineering College (now IIT Roorkee), Muhammedan Anglo-Oriental College (now Aligarh Muslim University), Canning College, Lucknow (now University of Lucknow), King George Medical College (now King George's Medical University), etc. were affiliated to the university. Schools situated in districts like Rawalpindi, Lahore, Jaypur, Cawnpur, and Mussoorie used to prepare and send students for the university entrance examination. No provisions to curtail territorial control were made after the establishment of University of Punjab and Allahabad in 1882 and 1887, respectively. After the Indian Universities Act of 1904 came in, however, for the first time, the university's control was curtailed to Bengal (which included Orissa and Bihar), Assam and Burma provinces. In the act, the Governor-General-in-Council was given the power to the limit territorial jurisdiction of the five universities; Calcutta, Bombay, Madras, the Punjab and Allahabad.

Following the Government of British India notification on 20 August 1904, Ceylon came under the University of Madras; provinces, states and agencies of Central India, such as the Central India Agency, Rajputana Agency, United Provinces of Agra and Oudh etc. went to the hands of the University of Allahabad; Northern and North-Western provinces and states went under the University of Punjab. Jurisdiction of schools and colleges in Eastern India was retained by Calcutta University. By 1907, two colleges in Punjab, three in the Central Province, five in the State of Rajputana Agency, six in the United Provinces of Agra and Oudh and seven in Ceylon were disaffiliated. A series of disaffiliations continued till 1948. Schools and colleges in Orissa and Bihar province came under University of Patna after its establishment in 1917. University of Rangoon was established in 1920, and the Burma region came under it in 1921. In the same year, University of Dacca was established and some colleges in East Bengal came under it; its control was cut with the partition of India in 1947. In 1948, all the schools and colleges in Assam left the university after the establishment of Gauhati University.

As of 2020, 151 colleges and 22 institutes and centres in West Bengal are affiliated with the university. Some of the affiliated colleges include:

- St. Xavier's College, Kolkata, an autonomous college affiliated to the University of Calcutta (not to be confused with St. Xavier's University, Kolkata)
- Asutosh College
- Bangabasi College
- Bethune College
- City College, Kolkata
- Dinabandhu Andrews College
- Goenka College of Commerce and Business Administration
- Gurudas College
- Heramba Chandra College
- Jogamaya Devi College
- Lady Brabourne College
- Maharaja Manindra Chandra College
- Maulana Azad College
- Sammilani Mahavidyalaya
- Scottish Church College
- Seth Anandaram Jaipuria College
- Surendranath College
- Vidyasagar College

=== Faculties, departments and centers ===
The university has 60 departments organized into seven faculties: arts, commerce, social welfare and business management, education, journalism and library science, engineering and technology, fine arts, music and home science, law and science; and an agriculture institute with six departments.

To provide agricultural education and research, the Institute of Agricultural Science was established under the University of Calcutta. It was founded by Pabitra Kumar Sen, who was the Khaira Professor of Agriculture (another endowment chair) in the early 1950s. Initial efforts began as early as 1913, but the first institute was set up only in 1939 at Barrackpore (a city near Kolkata) by the university, following the establishment of the Imperial Council of Agricultural Research (now known as the Indian Council of Agricultural Research) in 1926. Although it was shut down in 1941 due to World War II. Then, in 1954, a postgraduate department in agriculture was started in Ballygunge Science College by the university, with agricultural botany as the only subject; two years later, a Veterinary Science Institute was included, and the department was upgraded into a faculty called agriculture and veterinary science. In 2002, the university decided to reopen undergraduate agriculture courses in the agricultural experiment farm campus at Baruipur, a city south of Calcutta. In the same year, the department was restructured as a separate Institute of Agricultural Science.

The Faculty of Arts consists of 23 departments; commerce consists of three departments; education, journalism and library science consist of three departments; engineering and technology consist of eight departments; science has 22 departments, and home science offers courses on subjects such as food and nutrition, human development, and home science. The Faculty of Law was established in January 1909 as the University College of Law. It was granted status as the university's department of law in February 1996. This campus is popularly known as Hazra Law College. The faculty has many luminaries associated with it, including Rajendra Prasad, Rashbehari Ghose, and Chittaranjan Das.

In 2026, the University of Calcutta established a research centre dedicated to the study of Chaitanya Mahaprabhu in collaboration with the Bhaktivedanta Research Center. The centre was established to support academic study and research concerning Chaitanya's life, philosophy and Vaishnava tradition.

The centre offers certificate and diploma courses on the life and works of Chaitanya Mahaprabhu, as well as opportunities for research.

Centers at University of Calcutta
- A. K. Choudhury School of Information Technology
- Clinical Psychology Centre of University of Calcutta
- Women's Studies Research Centre
- Centre for Urban Economic Studies
- S. K. Mitra Centre for Space Environment
- University Science Instrumentation Centre (USIC)
- CPEPA-UGC center for “Electrophysiology & Neuro-Imaging Studies including Mathematical Modeling”
- Centre for Translation and Literary Geography (CTLG)
- Gandhian Studies Centre
- Peace Studies Research Centre
- Centre for Testing and Training for Providing Technical Back-up to the Beneficiaries for Agricultural and Horticultural Development
- Intellectual Property Rights (IPR) Cell
- Centre for Research in Nanoscience and Nanotechnology
- Centre for Social Sciences and Humanities
- Centre for South and Southeast Asian Studies
- Centre for Studies in Book Publishing
- Centre for Millimeter Wave Semiconductor Devices & Systems
- Centre for Pakistan and West Asian Studies
- Nehru Studies Centre
- Centre for the Study of Social Exclusion and Inclusive Policy
- Institute of Foreign Policy Studies
- Centre for Pollination Studies
- University of Calcutta – Calcutta Stock Exchange Centre of Excellence in Financial Markets (CUCSE-CEFM)
- Centre for Horticultural Studies

== Academics ==
=== Admission ===
For undergraduate courses—Arts (BA), Commerce (B.Com.) and Science (BSc) streams (except engineering courses)—one can apply directly for multiple courses based on their Higher Secondary School Certificate examination or any equivalent exam results. Students are shortlisted according to their marks and the number of places available. For some departments, entrance exams may take place at the sole discretion of the head of the department. Anyone can apply within five years of passing the Higher Secondary Examination. For engineering courses, admission is based on the West Bengal Joint Entrance Examination (WBJEE) rankings. Meanwhile, for postgraduate courses and doctoral degree courses, one has to take an entrance exam or written test given by the university or any national level exam related to the subject, held by the UGC. A merit list is prepared on the basis of the exam results.

=== Research ===
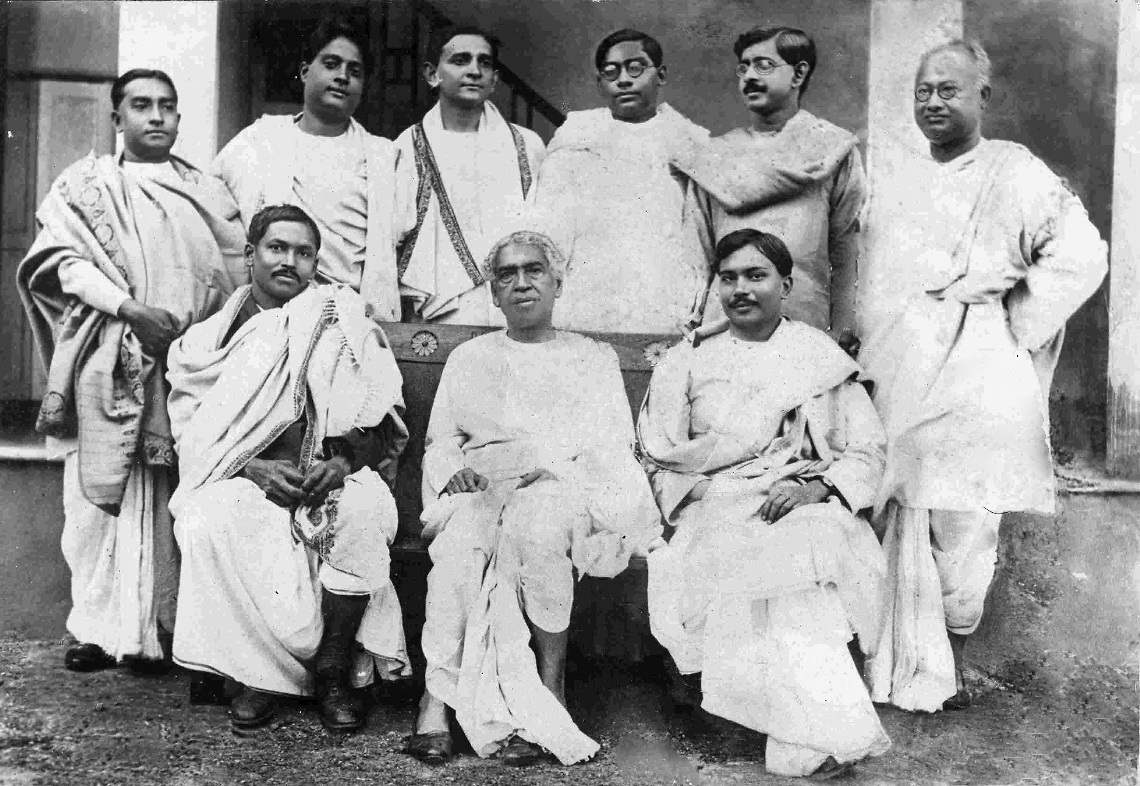
Notable scientists from the University of Calcutta. Seated (L to R): Meghnad Saha, Jagadish Chandra Bose, Jnan Chandra Ghosh. Standing (L to R): Snehamoy Dutt, Satyendranath Bose, Debendra Mohan Bose, NR Sen, Jnanendra Nath Mukherjee, N C Nag

Undergraduates may enroll for a three- or four-year program in engineering. Students choose a major when they enter the university and cannot change it unless they opt later for the university's professional or self-financed postgraduate programs. Science and business disciplines are in high demand, largely in anticipation of better employment prospects. Most programs are organized on an annual basis, though some programs are semester-dependent. Most departments offer master's programs of a year or a few years' duration. Research is conducted in specialized institutes as well as individual departments, many of which have doctoral programs.

The University of Calcutta has the largest research center, which started with the Post Centenary Golden Jubilee Celebrations of the University of Calcutta on January 17, 2006. This is the Center for Research in Nanoscience and Nanotechnology (CRNN) on the Technology Campus of CU at Salt Lake, West Bengal. The university has 18 research centers, 710 teachers, 3000 non-teaching staff and 11,000 postgraduate students.

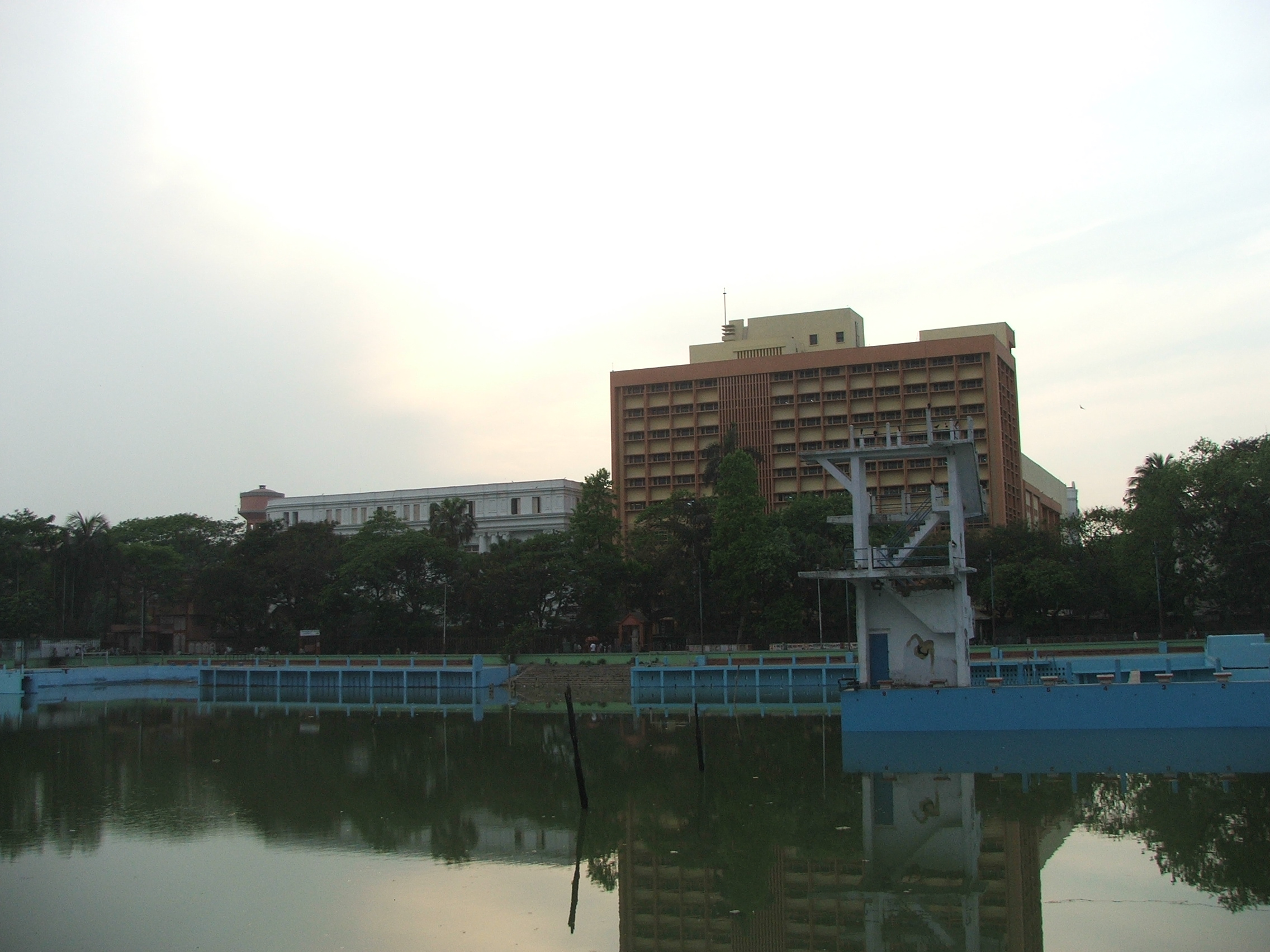
University Central Library viewed from College Square

=== Libraries ===
The central library at the Asutosh Siksha Prangan was started around the 1870s. Apart from 39 departmental libraries, it has a central library, two campus libraries, and two libraries at the advanced centers spread across the seven campuses. Students at affiliated colleges can also access the central library. The university library has over one million books and more than 200,000 bound journals, proceedings, manuscripts, patents and other valuable collections.

The University launched a modern Institutional Repository, a digital platform that makes the university's research freely available online, aligning with the open access movement in academia. Launched in April 2020, enhancing global access to its research. It seems likely that this benefits the global scholarly community by providing free access to previously paywalled content. Research suggests increased visibility, citations, and collaboration opportunities for researchers worldwide.

=== Publishing ===
The university has its own publishing house called University Press and Publications along with a book depot, which was established in the 20th century. It publishes textbooks, treatises, journals and confidential papers for all the examinations conducted by the university. It also publishes the journal The Calcutta Review, which is one of the oldest Asian university journals. The Calcutta Review was established by Sir John Kaye in May 1844. It has been issued biannually since 1913.

They also have an associated journal with Sage Publishing, Arthaniti: Journal of Economic Theory and Practice.

=== Rankings ===
University and college rankings

General – international
- ARWU (2024): 901-1000
- QS (World) (2025): 751-760
- QS (Asia) (2024): 187
- Times (World) (2024): 1001-1200
- Times (Asia) (2024): 351-400
- Times (Emerging) (2022): 401–500

General – India
- NIRF (Overall) (2024): 26
- NIRF (Universities) (2024): 18

Internationally, the University of Calcutta was ranked 751–760 in the QS World University Rankings of 2023 and 187 in Asia. It was ranked 1001–1200 in the world by the Times Higher Education World University Rankings of 2024, 351–400 in Asia in 2024 and in the 401–500 band among emerging economies in 2022. It was ranked 901–1000 in the Academic Ranking of World Universities of 2024.

In India, the University of Calcutta was ranked 26th overall by the National Institutional Ranking Framework (NIRF) in 2024 and 18th among universities.

=== Accreditation and recognition ===
In 2001, the University of Calcutta was awarded "Five-Star" status in the first cycle of the university's accreditation by the National Assessment and Accreditation Council (NAAC). In 2009 and 2017, NAAC awarded its highest grade of 'A' to the University of Calcutta in the second and third cycle of the university's accreditation. The UGC recognized the University of Calcutta as a "University with Potential for Excellence", on 8 December 2005. It was also awarded the status of "Centre with Potential for Excellence in Particular Area" in Electro-Physiological and Neuro-imaging studies including mathematical modeling.

The Manuscript Library at the university has also been designated as a "Manuscript Conservation Centre" under the National Mission for Manuscripts, which was established in 2003. The university has the highest number of students who have cleared the doctoral entrance eligibility exam, known as National Eligibility Test, in Natural Science and Arts to become eligible to pursue research with a full scholarship awarded by the Government of India. The university is a member of the United Nations Academic Impact initiative.

== Student life ==
The university has a ground and a tent in Maidan, where various sports are played. Inter-college tournaments in sports like football, archery, basketball, and hockey are also organised. The university rowing club started in the year 1983 at Rabindra Sarobar. The Calcutta University Students' Union organises social and cultural activities occasionally, which include blood donation camps, environmental awareness programmes, relief fund collection, teachers day celebrations, and Saraswati puja, among others.

Most of the affiliated undergraduate colleges located in the city have their own student hostels. The university has 17 hostels, of which eight (two for undergraduates and six for postgraduates) are for women. A total of 13 hostels are for paying guest students located across the city.

=== University song ===
In 1938, the then Vice-Chancellor Syama Prasad Mookerjee asked Rabindranath Tagore to compose a "university song" for the university. Rabindranath composed two songs instead of one— "Cholo Jai, Cholo Jai" and "Subho Karmapathe Dharo Nirvayo Gaan" (in English, "Let's go, let's go" and "Take up fearless song on the path of good deeds" respectively). The former song was adopted and sung by parading students on the university's foundation day on 24 January 1937. In the post-centenary golden jubilee year of the university, the latter was adopted as the new university song.

== Notable alumni and faculties ==
The university has produced many scientists, engineers, world leaders, Nobel laureates and teachers. As the oldest university of Bengal and India, it attracts students from diverse walks of life. Nobel laureates who either studied or worked there include Rabindranath Tagore, Chandrasekhara Venkata Raman, Ronald Ross, Amartya Sen and Abhijit Banerjee. The Academy Award winning director Satyajit Ray was an alumnus of the university, as was the composer of the national song of India, Bankim Chandra Chattopadhyay, as was Padma Shri Award winning director Tarun Majumdar. Some of the industrialists who studied at the university include Sir Rajen Mookerjee, Rama Prasad Goenka, Lakshmi Mittal, and Aditya Birla. Notable scientists, medical doctors and mathematicians associated with the university include Jagadish Chandra Bose, Prafulla Chandra Ray, Meghnad Saha, Anil Kumar Gain, Satyendra Nath Bose, Subir Kumar Ghosh, Ashoke Sen, Sanghamitra Bandyopadhyay, C. R. Rao, Asima Chatterjee, and Ujjwal Maulik.

Fatima Jinnah, one of the leading founders of Pakistan, studied dentistry at the university. A nationalist leader and former president of the Indian National Congress, co-founder of the Indian National Army, and head of state of the Provisional Government of Free India, Netaji Subhas Chandra Bose also spent some time at the university. Other presidents of the Indian National Congress include Womesh Chandra Bonnerjee, Surendranath Banerjee, Anandamohan Bose, Romesh Chunder Dutt, Bhupendra Nath Bose and Madan Mohan Malaviya. Malaviya was also the founder of the Banaras Hindu University. Among the presidents of India associated with this university are Rajendra Prasad (who studied there) and Sarvapalli Radhakrishnan (who taught there), and Pranab Mukherjee, who both studied and taught at affiliated colleges of the university. The former vice president of India, Mohammad Hamid Ansari studied there, as did a former deputy prime minister of India, Jagjivan Ram.

Many governors of Indian states studied at the university, including the first Indian governors of Bihar and Odisha, Lord Satyendra Prasanna Sinha, 1st Baron Sinha of Raipur, Chandeshwar Prasad Narayan Singh, governor of the Punjab and Uttar Pradesh, and Banwari Lal Joshi, the former governor of Delhi, Meghalaya, Uttar Pradesh and the current governor of Uttarakhand. The former rulers of the Indian princely states of Coochbehar and Saraikela were also alumni of this university, as were colonial-era prime ministers Albion Rajkumar Banerjee of Kashmir and A.K. Fazlul Huq of undivided Bengal.

Among its former students are eight chief ministers of West Bengal: Prafulla Chandra Ghosh, Bidhan Chandra Ray, Prafulla Chandra Sen, Ajoy Mukherjee, Siddhartha Shankar Ray, Jyoti Basu, Buddhadeb Bhattacharya, and Mamata Banerjee; three chief ministers each of Assam: Gopinath Bordoloi, Bishnuram Medhi and Golap Borbora; chief ministers of Bihar: Krishna Sinha, Binodanand Jha and Ram Sundar Das; two chief ministers of Meghalaya: B.B. Lyngdoh and S.C. Marak, and two chief ministers of Madhya Pradesh: Ravishankar Shukla, Kamal Nath. The chief ministers of Manipur, Rishang Keishing, Nagaland, S.C. Jamir and Sikkim B B Gurung were also students. Among the chief justices of the Supreme Court of India associated with the University are Bijan Kumar Mukherjea, Sudhi Ranjan Das, Amal Kumar Sarkar, Ajit Nath Ray, Sabyasachi Mukharji and Altamas Kabir. Others have also served as judges in the Supreme Court and as chief justices and judges in state high courts.

Heads of state from other countries associated with the university include four presidents of Bangladesh (Sheikh Mujibur Rahman, Mohammad Mohammadullah, Abu Sadat Mohammad Sayem, and Abdus Sattar) two prime ministers of Bangladesh (Muhammad Mansur Ali and Shah Azizur Rahman), three prime ministers of Pakistan (Mohammad Ali Bogra, Hussein Shaheed Suhrawardy, and Nurul Amin), the first premier of Burma under British rule, Ba Maw, the first president of Nepal, Ram Baran Yadav, and the first democratically elected prime minister of Nepal, Bishweshwar Prasad Koirala, as well as his successor Tulsi Giri.

One of the prominent indigenous leaders from the Tripuri Community, Birendra Kishore Roaza, also graduated from the University. Notably, Gyanendra Nath Chakravarti, an influential Indian Theosophist and a key figure in the early Theosophical Society, is also an alumnus of Calcutta University.

== See also ==
- Honoris Causa of the University of Calcutta
- List of University of Calcutta people
- List of vice-chancellors of the University of Calcutta
- Distance Education Council
- Education in India
- List of institutions of higher education in India
- List of universities in India
