= Mrinal Kanti Sen =

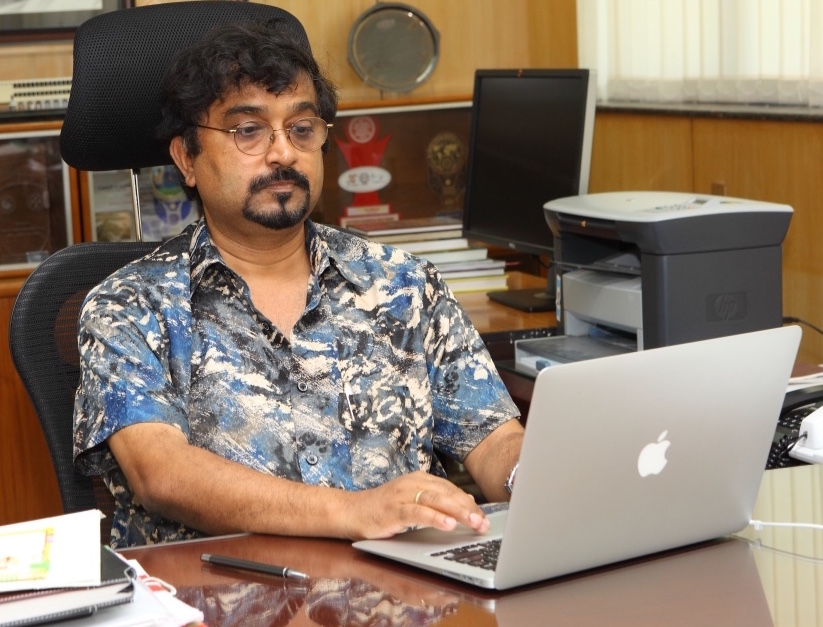
- Mrinal Sen
- Born: Jamshedpur, India
- Education: Indian School of Mines; University of Hawaiʻi at Mānoa
- Scientific career
- Fields: Geophysics
- Website: ig.utexas.edu/staff/mrinal-k-sen/ www.jsg.utexas.edu/researcher/mrinal_sen/

Mrinal Kanti Sen, an Indian-American geophysicist is the John A. and Katherine G. Jackson Chair in Applied Seismology at the Jackson School of Geosciences of the University of Texas at Austin. He holds joint appointment with the Institute for Geophysics (UTIG) and the Department of Geological sciences (DGS). Since 2016, he has been serving as the head of the energy research division at UTIG. He has been a pioneer in the field Seismic Wave Propagation and Inverse Theory applied to Geophysical Problems. He has published more than 180 papers, and two books, and supervised over 50 graduate students. As an author, he is widely held in libraries worldwide. He was recognized by the Society of Exploration Geophysicists in 2015 for pioneering development and application of global optimization methods in geophysical inversion.

== Education ==
He received his BSc and MSc degrees in applied geophysics, Indian School of Mines (now Indian Institute of Technology), Dhanbad, India in 1977 and 1979 respectively. He obtained his PhD in theoretical seismology from the Hawaii Institute of Geophysics, University of Hawaiʻi at Mānoa.

== Career ==
After finishing his PhD, Sen worked with Woodward-Clyde Consultants in Pasadena, California for two years (1987-1989) after which he joined Institute for Geophysics (UTIG), University of Texas at Austin where he is currently based. He was appointed a professor at DGS in 2004 and currently holds the John A. and Katherine G. Jackson Chair in Applied Seismology. Concurrently, he holds the position of professor and head, energy division at UTIG. During 2012 and 2013, he worked as the director of National Geophysical Research Institute (NGRI), Hyderabad India while on leave from the University of Texas at Austin.

== Service ==
Sen has been a long time member of the editorial board of renowned geophysical journals Geophysics and Journal of Seismic Exploration. He has been a member of several technical review committees and workshops in SEG, EAGE, DOE, DARPA, KAUST and NRC.

== Published works ==
- Sen, Mrinal K. (2006). Seismic Inversion. Society of Petroleum Engineers. ISBN 978-1-55563-110-9.
- ——; Stoffa, P.L. (1995). Global Optimization Methods in Geophysical Inversion. Elsevier. ISBN 978-0-08-053256-1.
- ——; Stoffa, P.L. (2013). Global Optimization Methods in Geophysical Inversion, second edition. Cambridge University Press. ISBN 978-1-107-01190-8.

== Awards and honors ==
- John A. and Katherine G. Jackson Chair in Applied Seismology, September 2007
- Decennial gold medal of the Indian Geophysical Union (IGU), 2012
- SPG, India honorary membership, 2012
- Dr. Hari Narayan award of the Geological society of India, 2013
- Fellow, Geological Society of India, 2013
- Distinguished Alumnus award, Indian School of Mines, 2014
- Distinguished Educator Award, Jackson School of Geosciences, University of Texas at Austin, 2015
- UTIG director's circle of excellence recognition, 2015
- Honorary membership of the Society of Exploration Geophysicists (SEG) for extraordinary contributions as a geophysicist, educator and author, 2015
- Distinguished Graduate Alumnus Award, Department of Geology and Geophysics, University of Hawaiʻi at Mānoa, 2016
- 2018 Virgil Kuaffman Gold medal of the Society of Exploration Geophysicists (SEG) for an outstanding contribution to the advancement of the science of geophysical exploration in the last five years. http://ig.utexas.edu/2018/05/04/mrinal-sen-to-receive-segs-virgil-kauffman-gold-medal-in-october
