= Atul Sen =

Indian revolutionary activist

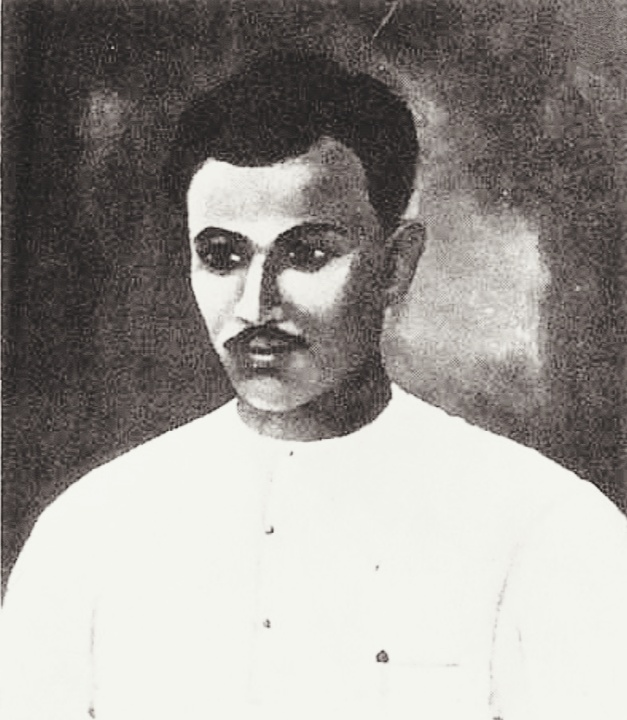
- Born: Senahati, Khulna District, British India
- Died: August 5, 1932; Kolkata, British India
- Cause of death: Suicide
- Occupation: Indian independence movement activist
- Organization: Jugantar

Atul Sen (? – 5 August, 1932) (Bengali: অতুল সেন) was a Bengali Indian independence movement revolutionary activist against British rule in India. He often used the aliases Sambhu and Kutti.

== Early life ==
Atul Sen was born in Senahati village, Khulna District in British India. His father's name was Ashwini Kumar Sen. While still a student, he joined the Revolutionary party. As a student, he came in contact with the famous revolutionaries of the village, Rasiklal Das, Anujacharan Sen, Ratikanta Dutt and Kiran Chandra Mukherjee and was initiated into the mantra of revolution.

== Revolutionary activities ==
He was an active member of the Jugantar Party, while studying in Jadavpur Engineering College. During the independence movement, the Statesman was campaigning against the revolutionaries in such a way that the revolutionaries decided to kill Watson, the editor of the newspaper, in order to retaliate and prevent it. On 5 August 1932, he shot at Sir Alfred Watson, but he failed to murder Mr. Watson and was arrested immediately. He committed suicide by consuming potassium cyanide.
