= Samar Sen (economist) =

Indian economist (1916–2004)

- Born: July 2, 1916
- Died: 28 July 2004 (aged 88)
- Occupation: Agricultural economist
- Spouse: Anita Sen
- Children: Abhijit Sen; Pronab Sen

Samar Ranjan Sen (2 July 1916 – 28 July 2004) was an Indian agricultural economist who served at the International Bank for Reconstruction and Development as its executive director. He belonged to the Indian Economic Service of 1938 batch.

== Biography ==
Born into an Indian Bengali Baidya Brahmin family. Sen obtained his PhD from the London School of Economics in 1946 and later taught at Dacca University before partition.

The first member of the Indian Economic Service in 1938, Sen joined the Ministry of Agriculture in 1948 and served as advisor of the Planning Commission prior to his appointment at the World Bank.

After returning to India, he became a part of Reserve Bank of India's green revolution east (1985) and later became a member of the Sarkaria Commission. He also established research centers of agriculture in the country.
