= Tribal revolts in India before Indian independence =

Below is given a chronological record of tribal and peasant revolts in India before independence from British rule in the 1947. The list covers those tribal uprisings that occurred during the period of British rule in India.

== 18th century ==
1767-1833 - The Chuar Rebellion was a prolonged tribal uprising against British East India Company oppression in the Jungle Mahals region, led by figures like Jagannath Singh Patar, Durjan Singh, Rani Shiromani, Madhav Singha Dev and Ganga Narayan Singh. 1770-1787 - Chakma revolt in Chittagong Hill Tracts. 1774-1779 Halba Dongar by Halba tribes in Bastar state against British armies and the Marathas. 1778 Revolt of the Paharia Sardars of Chota Nagpur against the British. 1784-1785 Uprising of the Mahadev Koli tribes in Maharashtra and Tilka Manjhi of Santal Tribe.

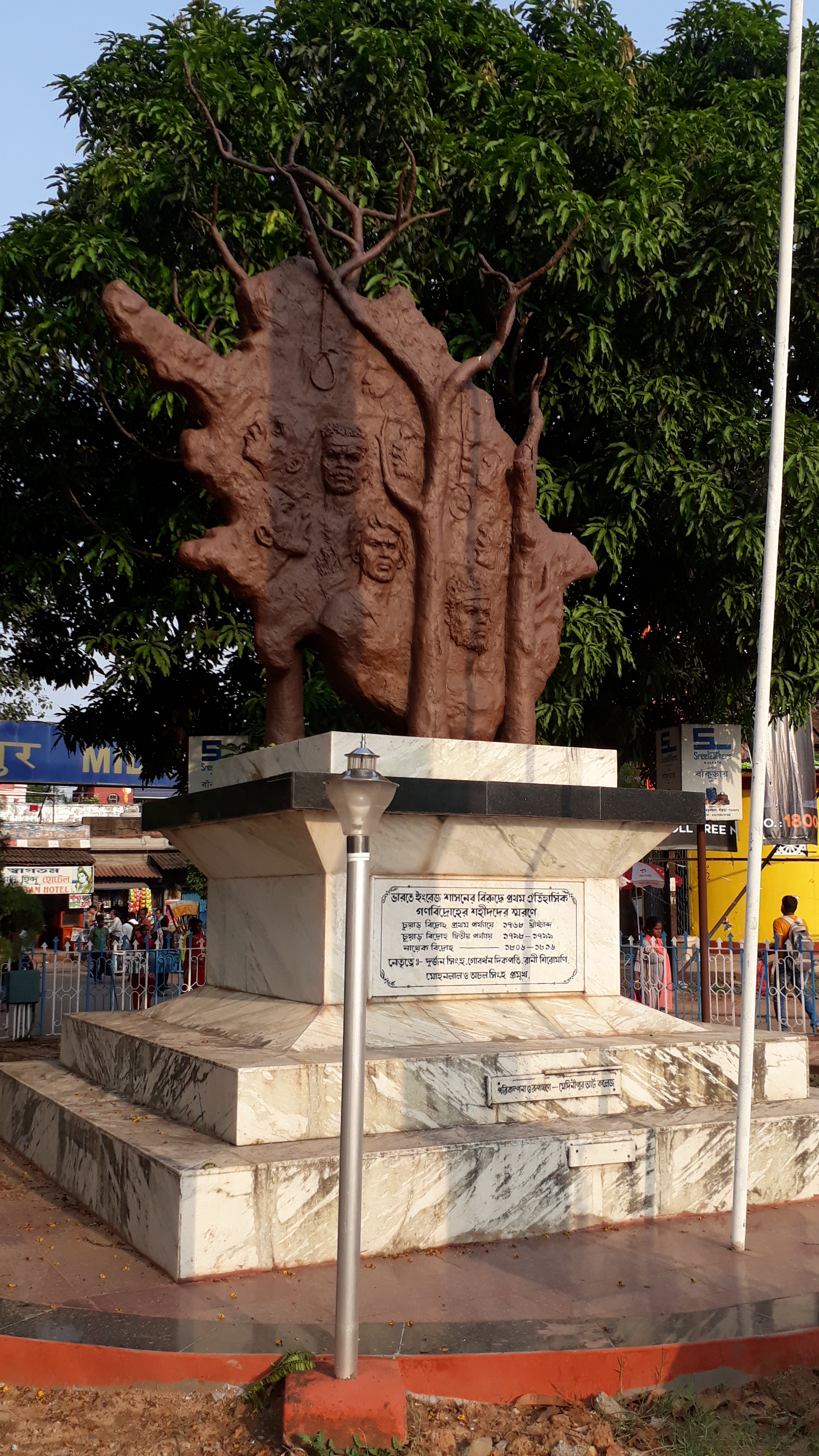
Memorial of Chuar rebellion at Midnapore

== 19th century ==
- 1812: The Kurichiyar and Kurumbar rebelled in Wayanad.
- 1822-1824: Gurjar tribe in the Roorkee-Haridwar-Saharanpur region of the United Provinces under the leadership of Raja Vijay Singh of Kunja Bahadarpur organized an armed rebellion against the British, which was recognized by the British government as a 'Goojar Revolt' of 1824.
- 1825: Singphos attacked and set fire to the British magazine at Sadiya in Assam.
- 1828: Singphos Chief attacked Sadiya with 3000 tribal warriors.
- 1831-1832: Kol uprising of Kol tribals including the Ho, Oraon, Bhumij and Munda people in Chota Nagpur.
- 1843: Singpho Chief Nirang Phidu attacked the British garrison and killed several soldiers.
- 1849: Kadma Singpho attacked British villages in Assam and was captured.
- 1850: The Khond tribe revolted in Orissa Tributary States under leadership of chief Bisoi.
- Telanga Kharia rebelled in Chotanagpur Division.
- 1855-1856: The Santal Hul by the Santhal community against the British in Rajmahal Hills led by Sido and Kanho.
- 1857: Chero and Kharwar revolt in Chota Nagpur as part of the wider 1857 Rebellion.
- 1857-1858: The Bhil revolted between the Vindhya and Satpura ranges under the leadership of Bhagoji Naik and Kajar Singh as part of the 1857 rebellion.
- 1859: The Andamanese in the Battle of Aberdeen.
- 1860: The Mizo raided Tripura state and killed 186 British subjects.
- 1860-1862: The Synteng revolt in the Jaintia Hills in Eastern Bengal and Assam.
- 1861: The Juang community revolted in Orissa.
- 1862: The Koya community revolted in the Godavari district against Muttaders.
- 1869-1870: The Santhals revolted at Dhanbad against a local monarch. The British mediated to settle dispute.
- 1879: The Naga revolted in Assam.
- 1879: The Koya revolted at Malkangiri in the Vishakapatnam Hill Tracts Agency under leadership of Tammandora.
- 1883: The Sentinelese tribal people of Andaman and Nicobar Islands in the Indian Ocean attacked the British.
- 1889: The mass agitation by the Munda against the British in Chota Nagpur.
- 1890-1895: The Lushai Rising saw the Lushai tribes revolting against the British repeatedly. First as the Western Lushai Rising under Khalkam, then a southern Rising under Zakapa and an Eastern Rising under Lalbura.
- 1891: The Anglo-Manipuri war where the British conquered the kingdom of Manipur.
- 1899-1900: Revolt by the Munda tribal community under leadership of Birsa Munda (The Ulgulan).

== 20th century ==
- 1910: Bastar rebellion in Bastar state of the Central Provinces of Berar.
- 1913-1914: Tana Bhagat movement in Bihar.
- 1917-1919: Kuki Uprising in Manipur against British colonial rule under the leadership of their chieftains called haosa.
- 1922: The Koya tribal community revolted at in the Godavari Agency against the British under leadership of Alluri Sitarama Raju.
- 1932: The Nagas revolted under leadership of 14-year old Rani Gaidinliu in Manipur.
- 1941: The Gond and the Kolam revolted in collaboration against British Government in the Adilabad district of Hyderabad state.
- 1942-1945: The tribes of Andaman and Nicobar islands revolted against occupation of their islands by Japanese troops during World War II.

== Gallery ==
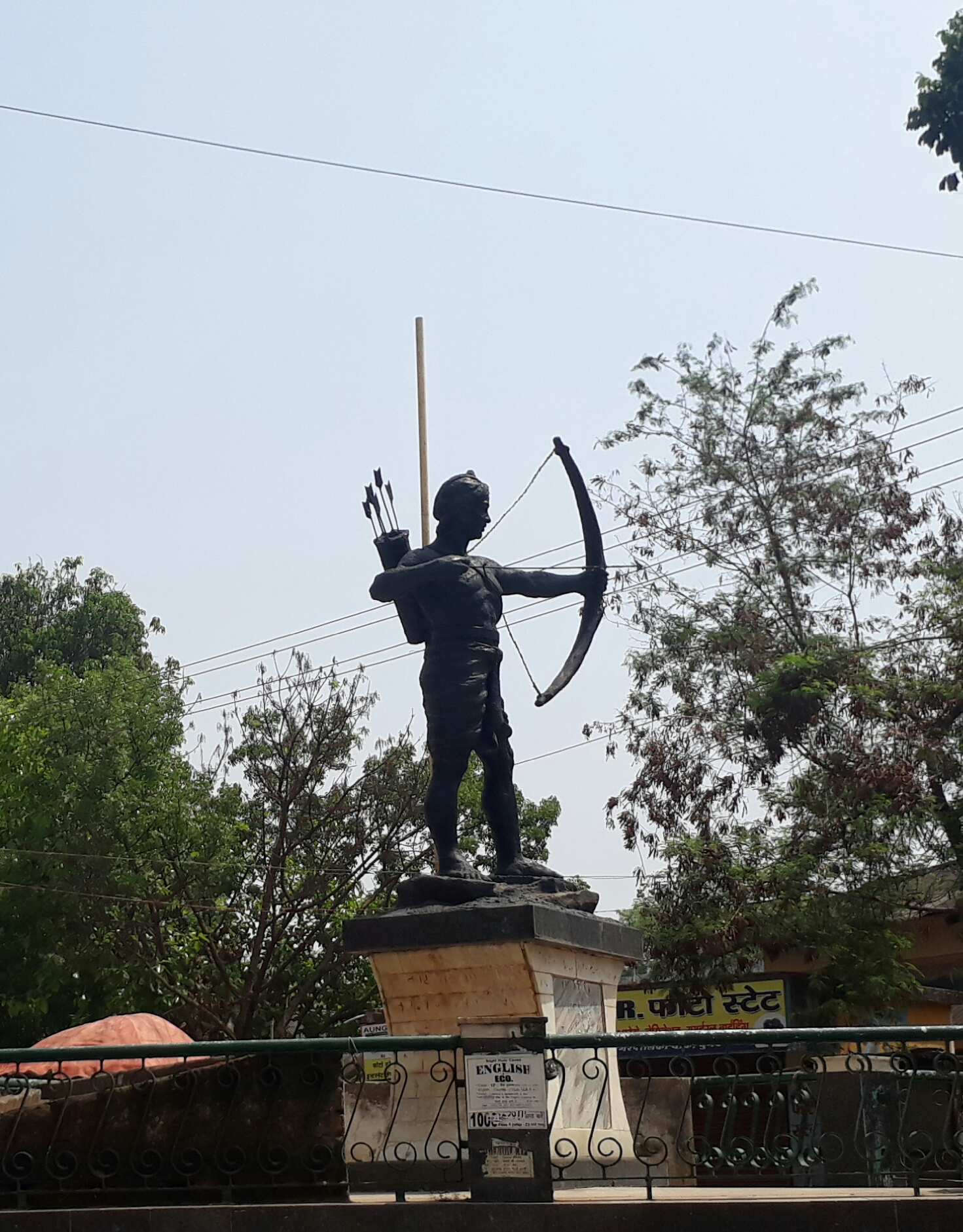
Statue of Tilka Majhi

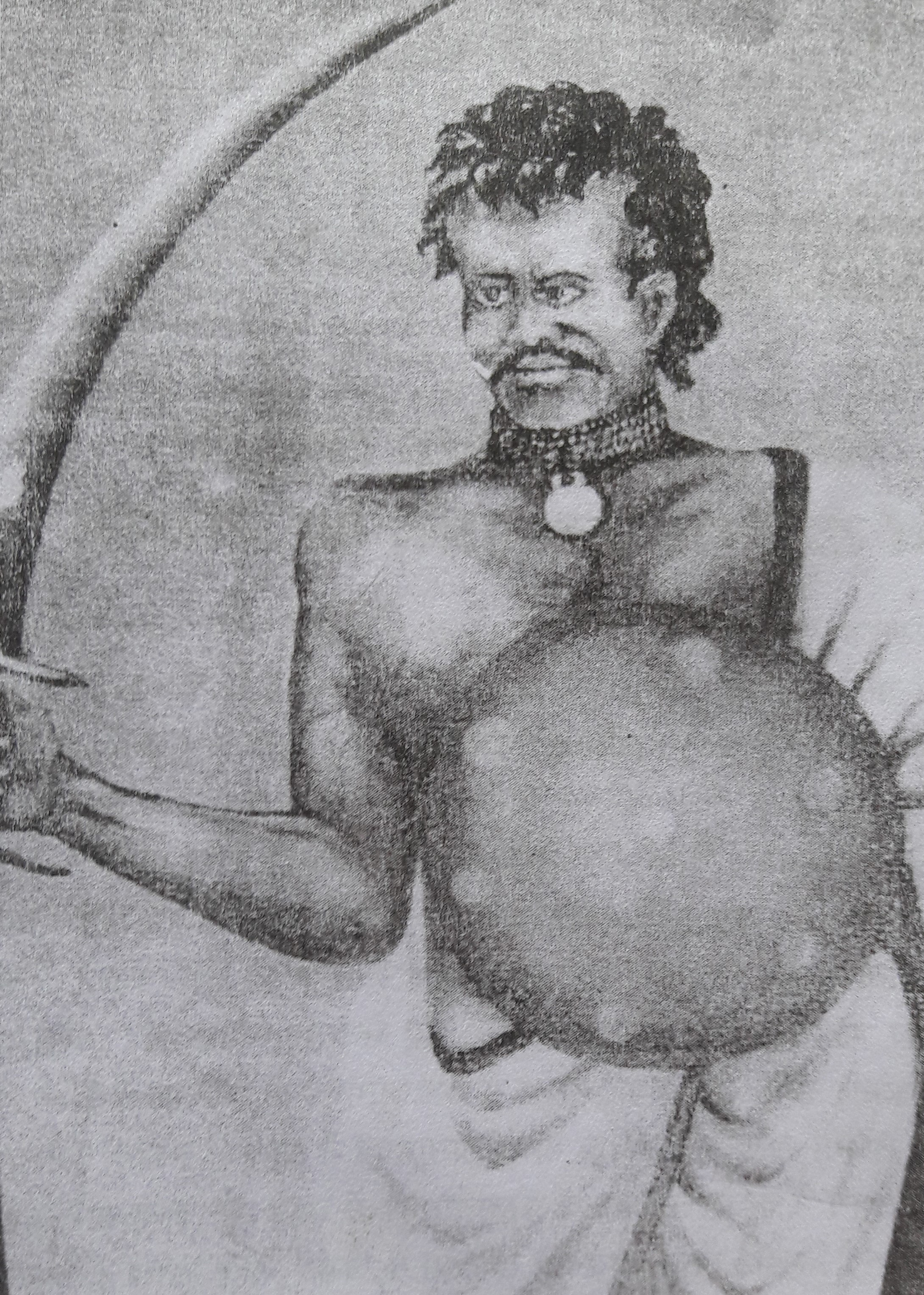
Telanga Kharia

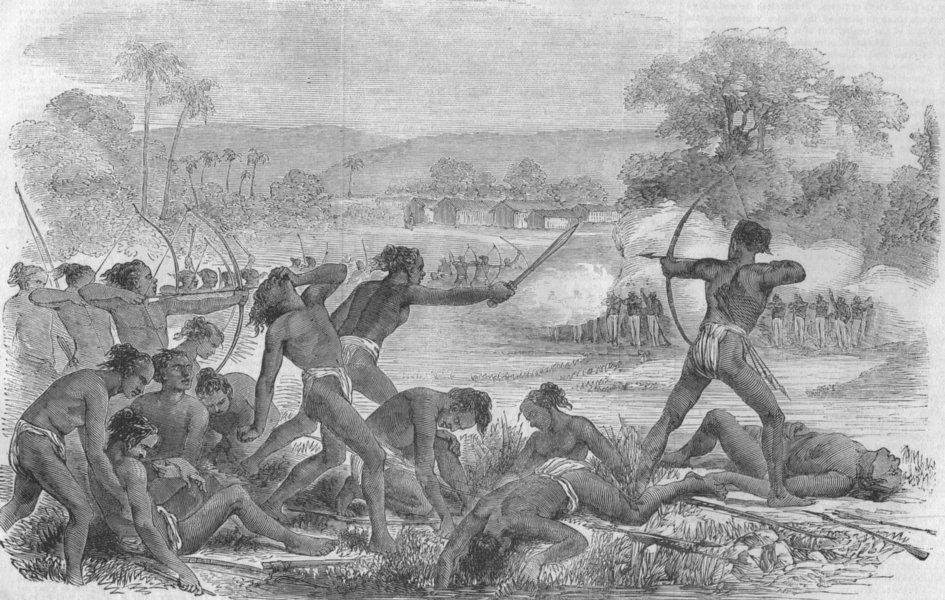
An illustration of an engagement during the Santhal rebellion by The Illustrated London News

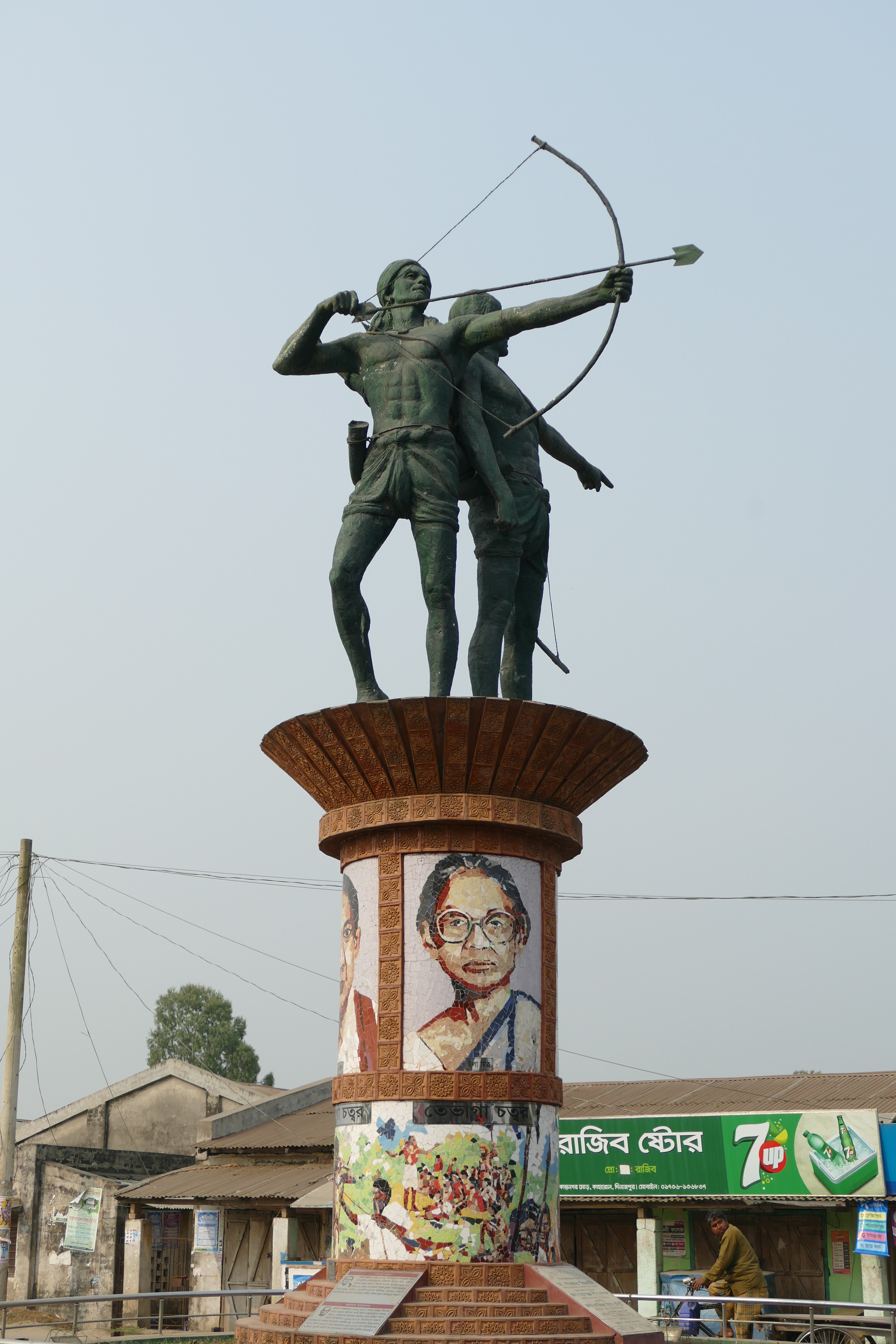
Statue of Sidhu and Kanhu

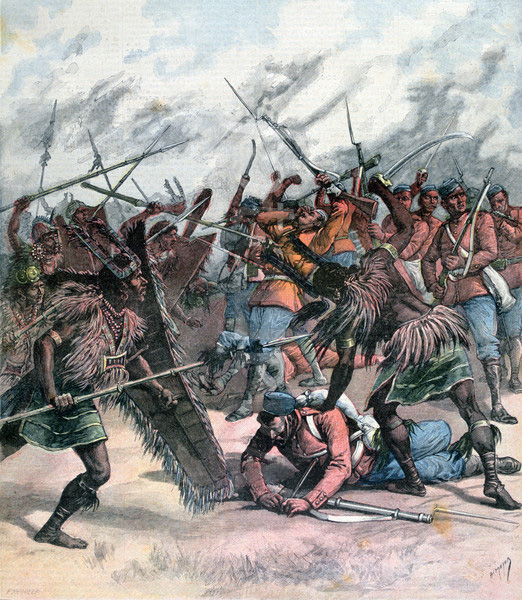
Anglo-Manipur War-1891

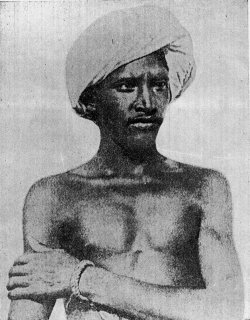
Birsa Munda

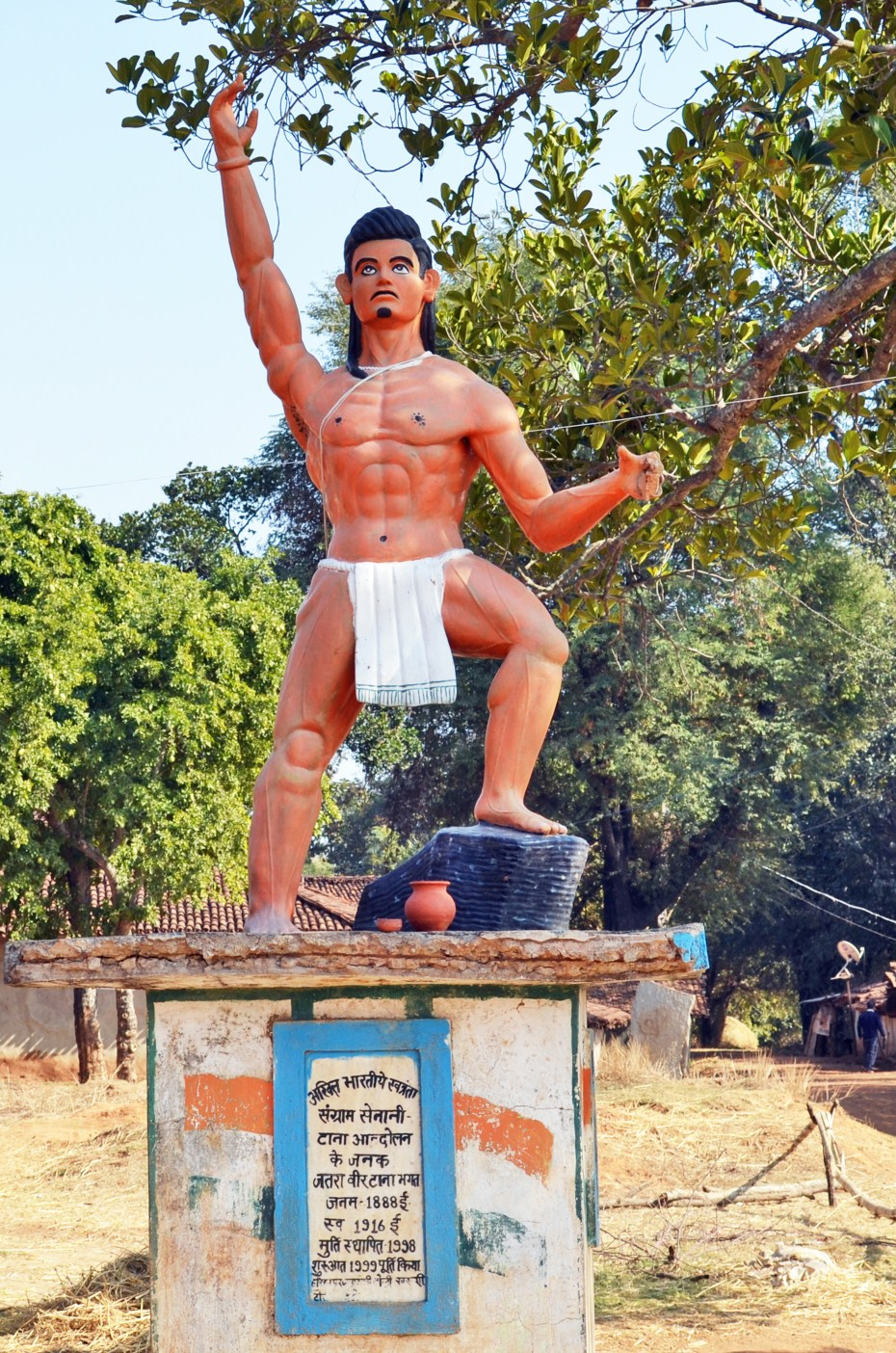
Statue of Jatra Tana Bhagat, Tana Bhagat Movement

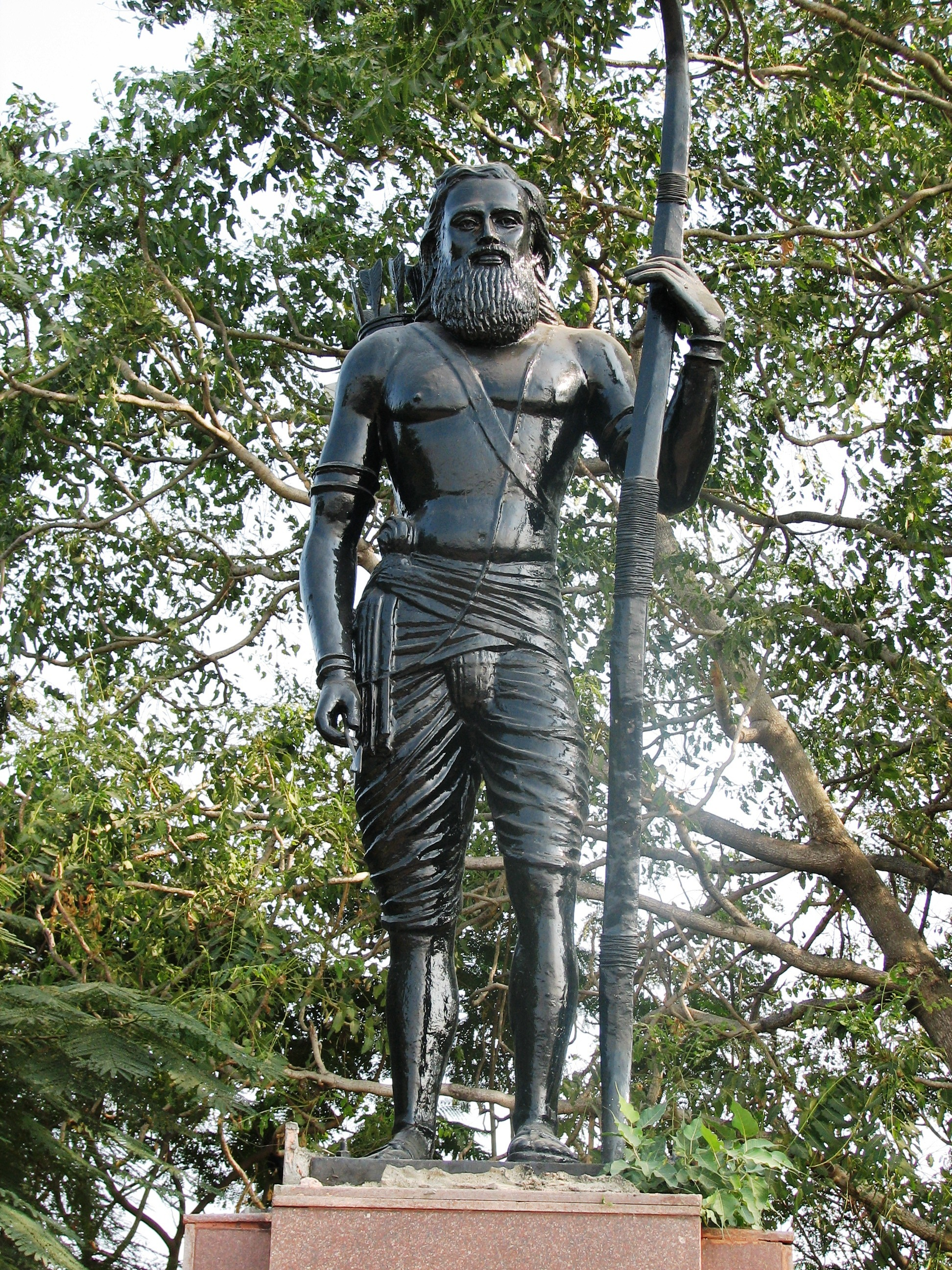
Statue of Alluri Sitarama Raju

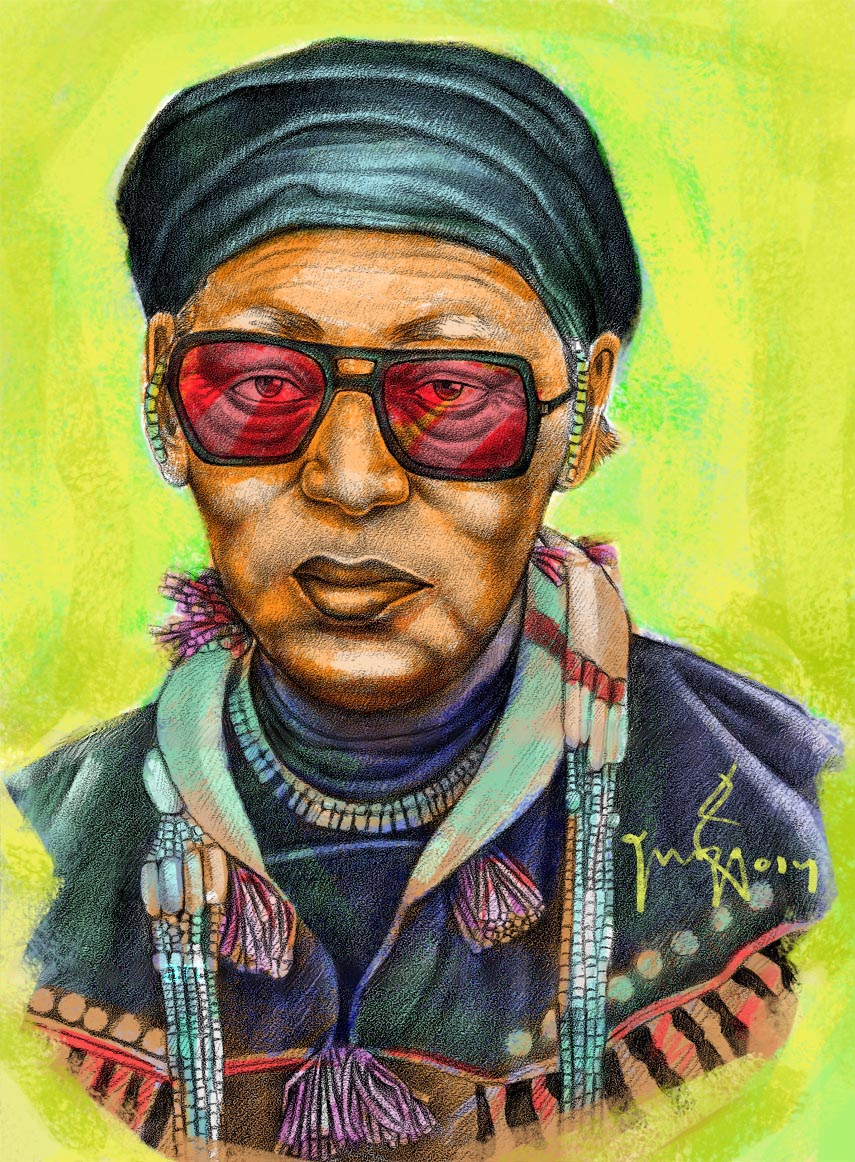
Rani Gaidinliu
