= Bhumij Revolt =

1832-33 Indian Tribal Rebellion

- Part of Chuar Rebellion
- Location: Jharkhand, West Bengal; 22°54′15″N 86°12′59″E
- Commanded by: Ganga Narayan Singh
- Objective: Self-governance
- Date: 1832–1833
- Outcome: Surrendered and estates transferred to Burdwan District & Manbhum District
- Casualties: Unknown
- Location of the rebellion

The Bhumij Revolt (also known as Ganga Narayan's Hungama, Jungle Mahal Uprising) was revolt of Bhumij tribals, led by Ganga Narayan Singh during 1832–33 in the Manbhum and Jungle Mahal areas of the erstwhile Midnapore district, Bengal.

The British have called it "Ganga Narain's Hangama" while historians have also written it as the Chuar rebellion. The word 'Hungama' (হাঙ্গামা) in Bangla means 'disturbance'.

== Background ==
=== Chuar Rebellion ===
The Chuar Rebellion was a series of uprisings by the tribal communities in the Jungle Mahals region against the oppressive policies of the British East India Company. The British referred to the rebels as "Chuars," meaning "barbaric," due to their resistance to land revenue collection. The rebellion spread across Midnapore, Bishnupur, and Manbhum district, peaking in 1798-1799. In response to the unrest, the British reorganized the region, establishing the Jungle Mahals district and implementing stricter administrative control. The legacy of the rebellion influenced the socio-political identity of the region.

=== Barabhum Raj ===
Raja Vivek Narayan Singh of Barabhum had two sons, Lakshman Narayan and Raghunath Narayan, who fought for succession after his death. Though Lakshman was the rightful heir according to tradition, the British supported Raghunath, leading to Lakshman’s exile. His son, Ganga Narayan Singh, later led a revolt against the British East India Company.

== Rebellion ==
Statue of Ganga Narayan Singh, the legendary leader of the Bhumij Revolt

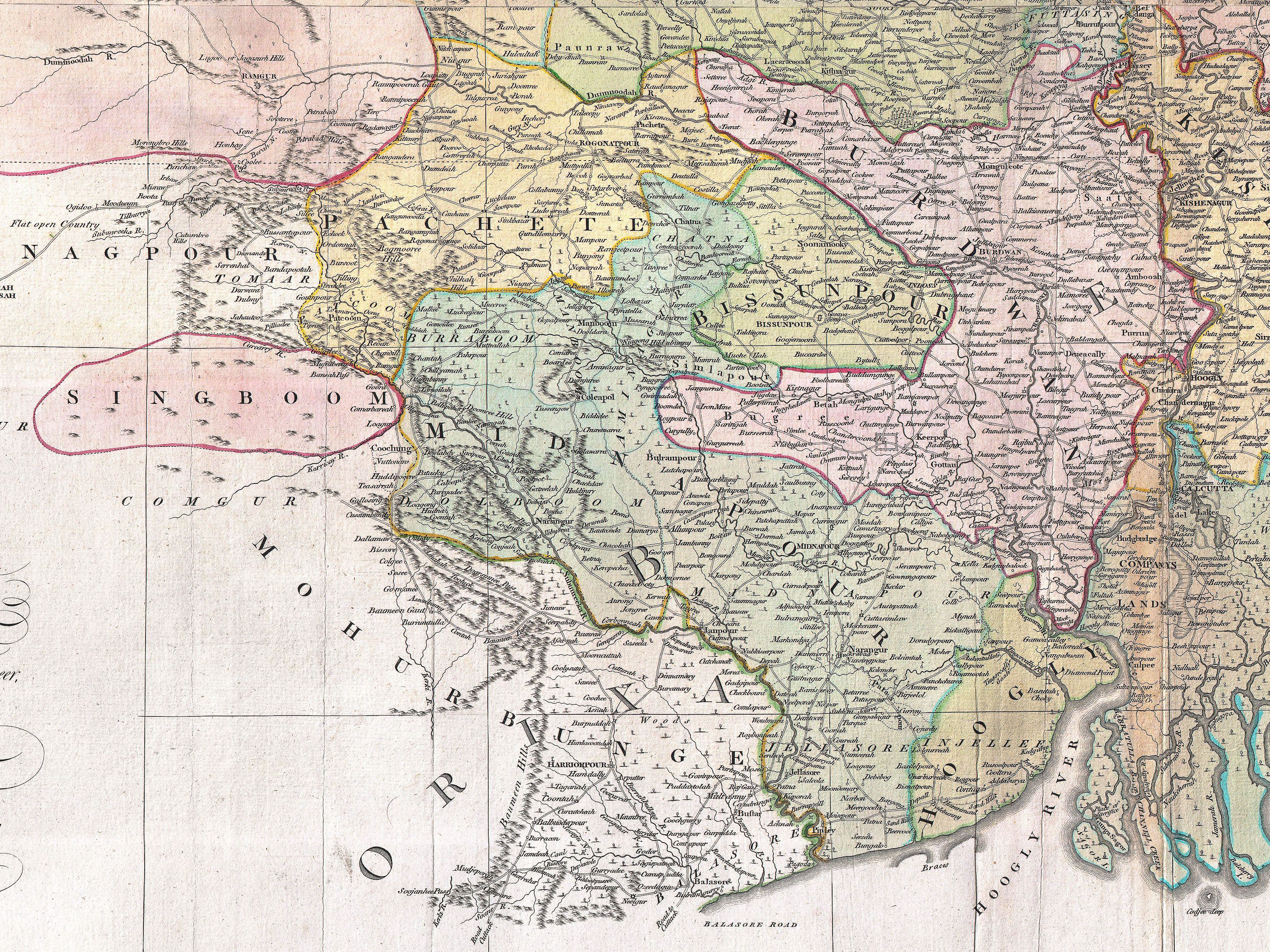
Barabhum on James Rennell's 1776 map.

Ganga Narayan was the first leader to fight against the Company rule and exploitation policy, who first formed the Sardar Gorilla Vahini Sena. On which there was support of every caste. Jirpa Laya was appointed as the chief commander of the army. Dhalbhum, Patkum, Shikharbhum, Singhbhum, Panchet, Jhalda, Bamni, Baghmundi, Manbhum, Ambikanagar, Amiyapur, Shyamsunderpur, Phulkusma, Raipur and Kashipur's Raja-Maharaja and zamindars supported Ganga Narayan Singh. Ganga Narayan attacked and killed the Dewan of Barabhum and British broker Madhab Singh in Vandih on April 2, 1832 AD. After that, along with Sardar Vahini, the court of Barabazar Muffasil, the office of salt inspector and the police station were handed over to the front.

The Collector of Bankura, Russell, arrived to arrest Ganga Narayan. But the Sardar Vahini army surrounded him from all sides. All the English army were killed. But Russell somehow escaped to Bankura after saving his life. This movement of Ganga Narayan took the form of a storm, which trampled the British regiments in Chhatna, Jhalda, Akro, Ambika Nagar, Shyamsundarpur, Raipur, Phulkusma, Shilda, Kuilapal and various places in Bengal. The impact of his movement was vigorous in places like Purulia, Bardhaman, Medinipur, and Bankura in Bengal, the tire Chotanagpur in Bihar (now Jharkhand), Mayurbhanj, Keonjhar and Sundergarh in Orissa. As a result, the entire Jungle Mahal was out of the control of the British. Everyone started supporting Ganga Narayan as a true, honest, heroic patriot, and social worker.

Eventually, the British had to send an army from Barrackpore Cantonment, which was sent under the leadership of Lieutenant Colonel Kapoor. The army was also defeated in the conflict. After this, Ganga Narayan and his followers expanded the scope of their action plan. The commissioner baton of Bardhaman and the commissioner hunt of Chotanagpur were also sent but they too could not succeed and had to face defeat in front of the Sardar Vahini army.

From August 1832 to February 1833, the entire Jungle Mahal remained disturbed at Chotanagpur in Bihar, Purulia, Bardhaman, Medinipur, Bankura in Bengal, Mayurbhanj, Keonjhar and Sundergarh in Orissa. The British tried in every way to suppress Ganga Narayan Singh, but the British could not stand in front of Ganga Narain's cleverness and fighting skills. The commissioners of Bardhaman, Chotanagpur and Orissa (Raipur) escaped after being defeated by Ganga Narayan Singh. Thus, the struggle was so fast and effective that the British were compelled to withdraw the land sale law, inheritance law, excise duty on lac, salt law, and jungle law.

At that time Thakur Chetan Singh of Kharsawan was running his rule in collusion with the British. Ganga Narain went to Porahat and Singhbhum and organized the Kol (Ho) tribes there to fight against Thakur Chetan Singh and the British. On February 6, 1833, Ganga Narain attacked the Hindshahar police station of Thakur Chetan Singh of Kharsawan with the Kol tribes, but unfortunately died on the same day while fighting against the British and the rulers till the last breath of his life.

Then on February 7, 1833, Ganga Narayan Singh, the hero of the Bhumij rebellion (also known as the Chuar rebellion), left his mark and became a hero to his people.

== Aftermath ==
By Regulation XIII of 1833, the district of Jungle Mahals was broken up. The estates of Senpahari, Shergarh and Bishnupur were transferred to Burdwan District and the remainder constituted the Manbhum District.

== See also ==
- Kol uprising
- Chuar Rebellion
- Tribal revolts in India before Indian independence
- History of Jharkhand
