= South-West Frontier Agency =

- Agency of British India
- 1833–1854
- Flag

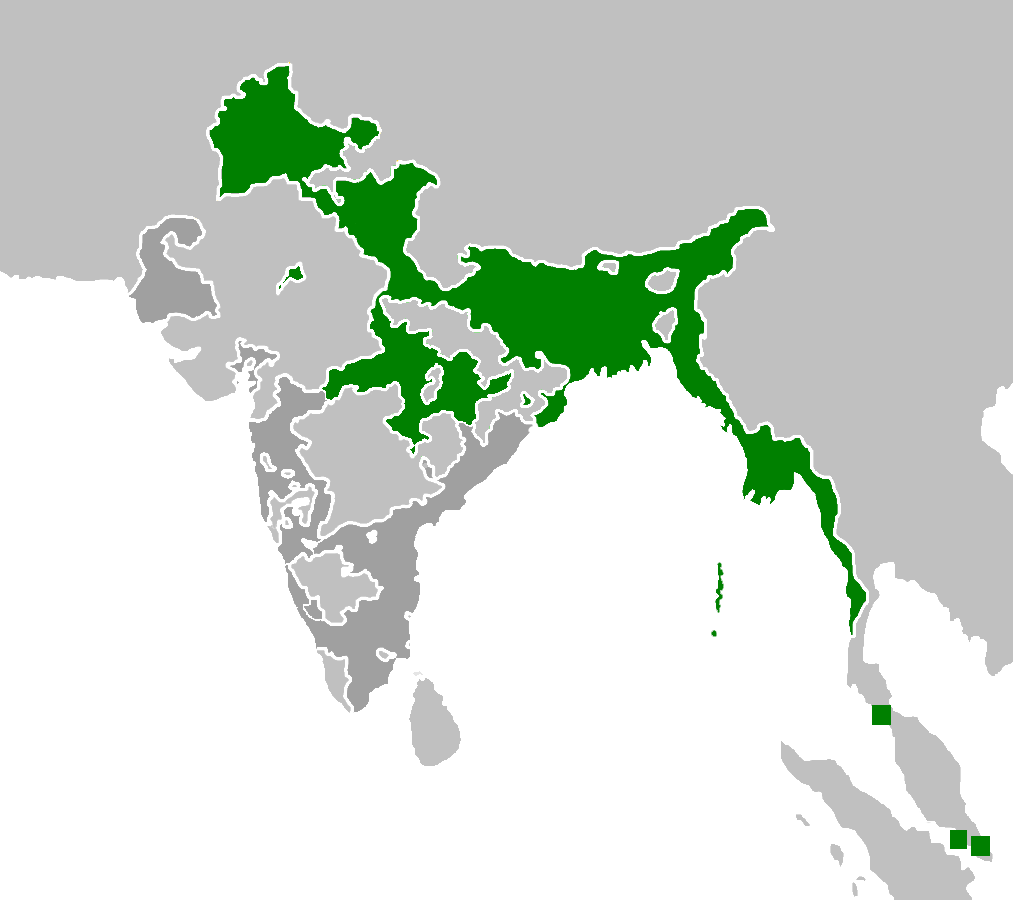
- The South-West Frontier Agency on the eastern side of the Bengal Presidency at its peak in 1853 (in green), with the rest of British India in pink.
- Capital: Kishanpur
- Government
- Agent to the Governor-General
  - 1833-1839: T. Wilkinson
  - 1839-1839: Mr. John Davidson
  - 1839-1849: Msyor J. R. Ouseley
  - 1849-1849: J. Hannyngton
  - 1849-1859: Mr. J. H. Crawford
  - 1853-1854: Mr. W. J Allen
- History
  - Established: 1833
  - Bifurcation: 1854
Preceded by
Jungle Mahals
Dhalbhum
Chota Nagpur
Succeeded by
Chota Nagpur Division

The South-West Frontier Agency was an administrative unit established by the British government in 1833 following the receipt of a detailed report from special commissioners. The agency was later renamed the Chota Nagpur Division in 1854.

== Background ==
The Chuar Rebellion (1766–1834) and the Kol Mutiny (1831–1832) were significant uprisings by tribal communities against the British East India Company's oppressive policies. The Chuar Rebellion occurred in the Jungle Mahals region, where tribal groups resisted land revenue collection, leading the British to label them "Chuars" as "barbaric." The rebellion spread across Midnapore, Bishnupur, and Manbhum, prompting the British to reorganize the area and impose stricter control by establishing the Jungle Mahals district. Similarly, the Kol Mutiny in Chhota Nagpur was triggered by exploitation, including unfair land policies and forced labor. Despite being suppressed, both uprisings showcased tribal resistance to colonial rule. In response, the British created the South-West Frontier Agency to bring stability to the region and prevent further unrest, a strategy that sought to strengthen administrative control. These uprisings significantly influenced the socio-political identity of the affected regions.

== History ==
=== Formation and Administrative Structure ===
Under Regulation XIII of 1833, the British government introduced new administrative measures, leading to the formation of the South-West Frontier Agency in 1834. The agency was created to bring stability to the region, which had witnessed tribal unrest from 1831 to 1833. The agency was later renamed the Chota Nagpur Division in 1854. The agency had three divisions: Manbhum, comprising parts of the Jungle Mahals and Dhalbhum; Lohardaga, which included the Chota Nagpur Zamindari and its dependent parganas; and Hazaribagh, covering Ramgarh, Kharakdiha, and other estates. The region was deregulated from ordinary laws, and simplified governance ensured direct engagement between officers and locals. Measures were taken to curb exploitation by moneylenders and land speculators, while annual tours by officials and summary trials for tribal cases were mandated. Land transfers in lieu of rent or debt were also regulated.

The Bhumij Revolt of 1832-33 was suppressed, and uprisings in Singhbhum (Kolhan) during 1830 and 1836 created a significant crisis. In response, the British took military action in 1836–37, and the entire region was annexed into the South-West Frontier Agency in 1837.

Divisions of South-West Frontier Agency
		Before transfer of estates (1833-1837)				After transfer of estates (1837-1854)			
Divisions			Manbhum	Lohardaga	Hazaribagh	Manbhum	Singhbhum (1837)	Lohardaga	Hazaribagh
			Dhalbhum (1833)	Chota Nagpur; Zamindari	Ramgarh	Dhalbhum (1837)	Dhalbhum (1846)		
Transferred to Burdwan Division (West Burdwan)	Years	Jungle Mahals estates	Barabhum		Kharakdiha	Barabhum	Kolhan		
Transferred to Burdwan Division (West Burdwan)	1834	Bishnupur	Ambikanagar		Other estates	Ambikanagar	Mayurbhanj		
Transferred to Burdwan Division (West Burdwan)	1837	Bankura town	Bhalaidiha			Bhalaidiha	Porahat		
Transferred to Burdwan Division (West Burdwan)	1847	Chhatna	Chhatna (1833–1837)			Chhatna (1837–1847)	Seraikela		
			Simlapal			Simlapal	Kharsawan		
			Supur			Supur	Chaibasa		
			Balsye			Balsye			
			Panchet			Panchet			
			Bagmundy			Bagmundy			
			Jhalda			Jhalda			
			Jharia			Jharia			
			Patkum			Patkum			
			Other estates			Purulia (1838)			
						Other estates			

=== The Wilkinson Rule ===
The South West Frontier Agency, incorporating Chhotanagpur, with Captain Wilkinson as Principal Agent. Around the same time, the Ho people revolted against local rulers in Porahat, Seraikela, and Kharsawan. Seeking British help, the rulers signed treaties, leading to military intervention. By 1837, the Mankis and Mundas surrendered and made a treaty with Wilkinson, resulting in the formation of the "Kolhan Separate Estate," including Ho-dominated villages from Mayurbhanj, Porahat, Seraikela, and Kharsawan. The estate was integrated into the South West Frontier Agency. An “Assistant Political Agent” was appointed under Wilkinson, with Chaibasa as the headquarters. Governance was entrusted to Mankis (leaders of pirs) and Mundas (village heads). The “Wilkinson Rule,” introduced in 1834 for the South West Frontier Agency, was extended to Kolhan in 1837.

== Transition to Chota Nagpur Division ==
Later in 1854, under Act XX, the administrative unit was renamed a Commissionary, with the Political Agent being designated as the Commissioner and the Assistant Political Agent becoming the Deputy Commissioner. This restructuring granted the Deputy Commissioner full executive and judicial powers, significantly enhancing the role's authority. The region was reorganized into the Chota Nagpur Division, with Ranchi as its headquarters, and Hazaribagh, Chaibasa, and Purulia serving as subordinate district centers. These changes were pivotal in shaping the region's administration under British rule.

== See also ==
- Kol uprising
