= Chuar Rebellion =

1767-1833 peasant rebellion

- Part of Tribal revolts in India before independence
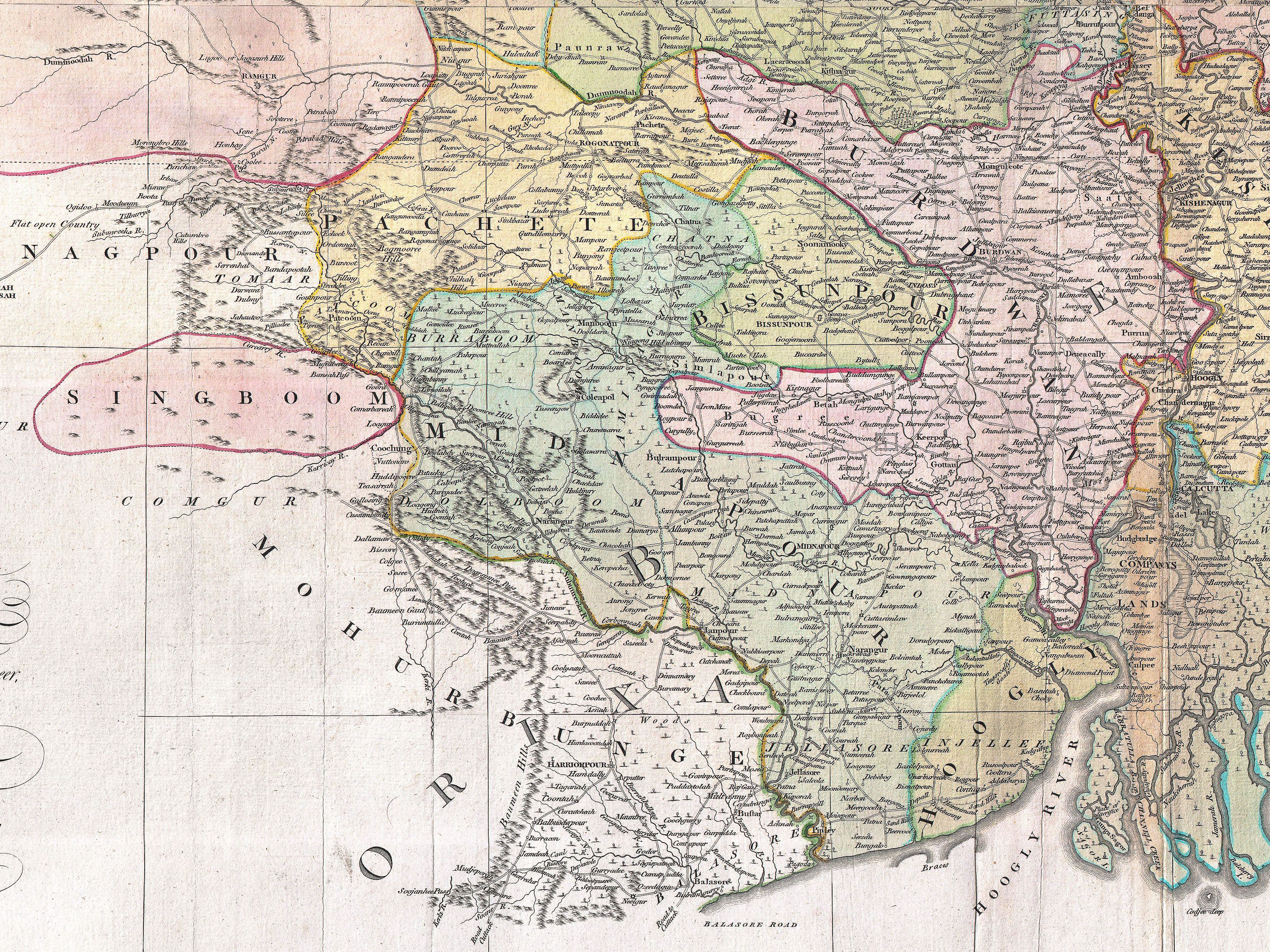
- Estate on James Rennell's 1776 map.
Date	1767–1804
Location	Dhalbhum Estate, Midnapore district, Manbhum District & Bishnupur Estate in British India (present-day West Bengal & Jharkhand in India) 22°55′N 86°31′E
Result	Surrendered and estates transferred to Jungle Mahals District, and later transferred to South-West Frontier Agency & Burdwan District

Belligerents
Ghatshila Raj; Dhalbhum Raj; Midnapore Raj; Bishnupur kingdom; Barabhum Raj; Various other Rajas, Zamindars, Sardars, Ghatwals & Paiks	East India Company

Commanders and leaders
Jagannath Singh Patar (executed); Subal Singh (executed); Samangunjan; Raja Jagannath Dhal; Durjan Singh; Lal Singh; Baidyanath Singh; Rani Shiromani (POW); Madhav Singha Dev (POW); Ganga Narayan Singh †; Raghunath Singh (executed)	Lt. Ferguson; Lt. Rooke; Captain Morgan; Captain Forbes; CO. Sidney Smith; sepoys; Captain Goodyear; Lt. Nun
- Location of the rebellion

Chuar Rebellion, also called the Chuar Bidroha was a series of peasant movements between 1767 and 1834 by the tribal inhabitants of the countryside surrounding the Jungle Mahals settlements of Dhalbhum, Midnapore, Bishnupur and Manbhum against the rule of the East India Company (EIC).

== Etymology ==
The literal meaning of Chuar or Chuad or Chuhad is a barbaric, an uncultured or a robber. During the British rule, Bhumijas of the Jungle Mahal area were called chuars (low caste people), their main occupation was hunting of animals and birds and farming in the forests, but later some Bhumij became zamindars and some started working as Ghatwals (feudal lords) and Paiks (soldiers). When the East India Company started collecting revenue for the first time in 1765 in the Jangal Mahal district of Bengal, then in this conspiratorial way of the British, the water, forest, land grab activities were first opposed by the people of Bhumij tribe and the revolution was blown against the British rulers in 1769. When the British asked who these people were, their stoic landlords addressed them as Chuar (meaning rude or wicked in Bengali) out of hatred and contempt, after which the name of that rebellion was 'Chuar Rebellion'.

== Background ==
=== Great famine of 1770-71 ===
Before the end of 1770, it was officially recorded that one-third of the population had vanished. Depopulation became the greatest concern for the British East India Company. Despite the ongoing famine, the Company continued to pressure local rulers, including the weakened Rajas of Bishnupur and Birbhum, as well as the old zamindars (who had been responsible for tax collection during the Mughal era), to increase revenue.

In Birbhum alone, by 1771, only 4,500 out of 6,000 rural villages remained. Depopulation continued until 1785, and the lands of around 1,600 abandoned villages reverted to jungle. In Bishnupur, hundreds of villages were entirely deserted, and even in the larger towns, fewer than one-fourth of the houses remained occupied. Among the worst affected areas in Bengal were Purnia and Bishnupur, both of which suffered immensely from the famine.

The Company's revenue demand for 1768-69 was set at £1,524,567, and the actual receipts exceeded that amount. However, by 1770, the receipts had drastically dropped to just £65,355, even though the demand remained at £1,380,269. Despite a good harvest in 1771, vast areas of cultivable land were left unused. By 1772, Warren Hastings estimated that one-third of the population had perished by that time.

== Rebellion ==
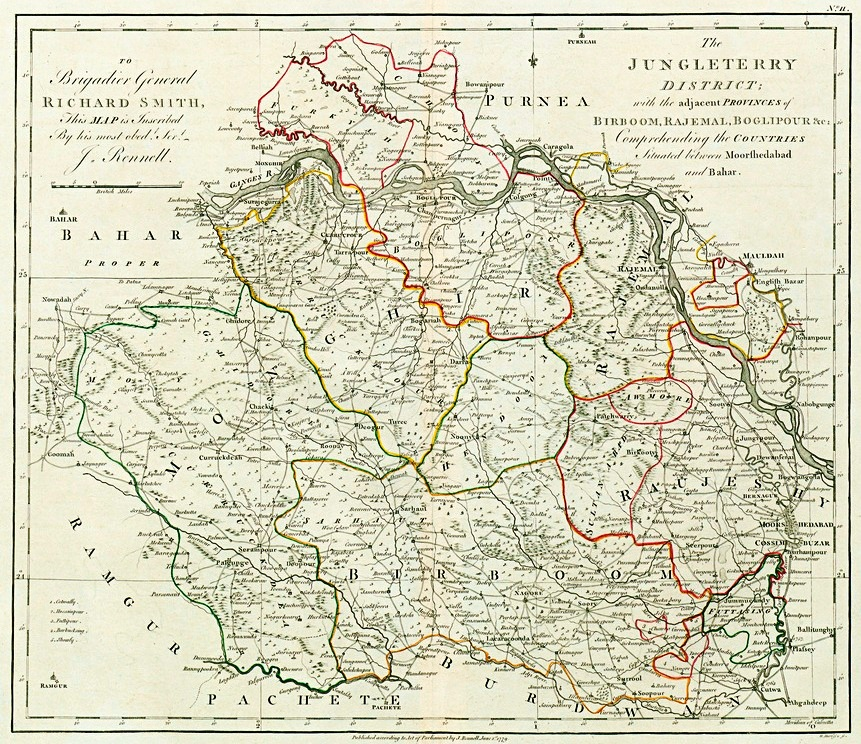
1779 map of the Jungle Terry District

In 1767, the tribal revolt started in Dhalbhum and Barabhum and later spread to Manbhum, Midnapore and Bishnupur districts of Jungle Mahal. Jagannath Singh Patar at Dhalbhum, Subal Singh at Kuilapal and Shyam Gunjam Singh at Dhadka led this rebellion in 1767-71. The Chuar people intensified this rebellion in the surrounding areas of Manbhum, Raipur and Panchet. In 1782-85, Mangal Singh along with his allies also led this rebellion. The Chuar Rebellion was at its peak in 1798–99 under the leadership of Durjan Singh, Lal Singh and Mohan Singh, but was crushed by the British Company's forces.

In early 1799, the Chuars were organized at three places around Midnapore: Bahadurpur, Salboni and Karnagarh. From here they launched guerrilla attacks. Among these was the residence of Rani Shiromani in Karnagarh, who actively led them. According to the letter written by the then collector, the Chuar rebellion continued to grow and by February 1799, they had occupied a continuous wide area of many villages around Midnapore. In March, Rani attacked with about 300 rebels and looted all the weapons of the Company's soldiers in the garh (local fort) of Karangarh. This sequence of attacks and plunder continued till December 1799. It was later led by Jagannath Patar's son Baidyanath Singh and grandson Raghunath Singh. Later, other zamindars, along with the Ghatwals and Paiks, spread this revolt to the entire Jungle Mahal and the surrounding areas, which lasted till 1809. Even after this, the rebellion continued in some areas of Bengal in a sporadic form.

=== Rebellion at Bishnupur (1788-1809) ===
Between 1788 and 1809, the Chuars and Paiks of the Bishnupur and Midnapore parganas revolted against the British East India Company under the leadership of Madhav Singha Dev. After the 1810 revolt led by Baijnath Singh of Dampara, which prompted the deployment of military forces, the Ghatwali system in Jaibalea, Bishnupur, was dismantled by East India Company. In its place, new police stations were established across various estates, and the daroga police system was reinstated.

=== Ganga Narayan Hungama (1832–1833) ===
Between 1832 and 1833, Ganga Narayan led various local castes and tribal groupsa to attack British forces and their collaborators, occupying British offices. His movement gained such victories that entire Jungle Mahal was out of British control. Ganga Narain moved on to Porahat and Singhbhum, organizing the Kol (Ho) tribes there to fight against the British and Thakur Chetan Singh, the British collaborative ruler. On February 6, 1833, Ganga Narain attacked the Hindshahar police station of Thakur Chetan Singh of Kharsawan with the Kol tribes, but died on the same day. Ganga Narayan's revolt forced the British to withdraw the land sale law, inheritance law, excise duty on lac, salt law, and jungle law.

== Outcome ==
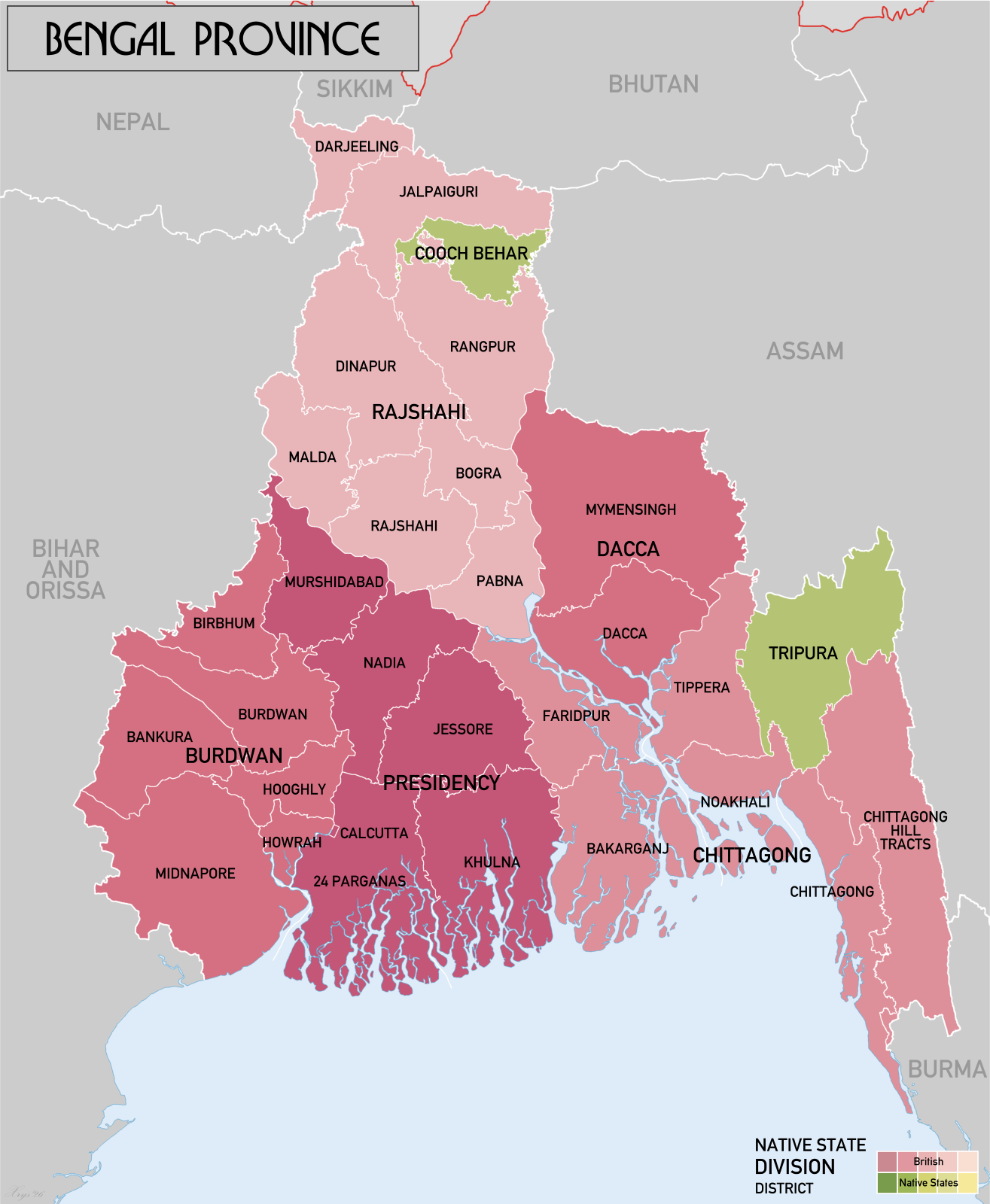
Birbhum, Bankura, Midnapore, Howrah, Hooghly, Burdwan under Burdwan district in 1931.

By Regulation XIII of 1833, the district of Jungle Mahals was broken up, and a new administrative unit known as the South-West Frontier Agency was formed. The estates of Senpahari, Shergarh and Bishnupur were transferred to Burdwan District and the remainder constituted the Manbhum District.

== Leaders ==
List of leaders in the conflict
Sl. No.	Revolt	Leader	zamindar	Active years	Outcome	Ref
1	Revolt of the Rajas of Dhalbhum	Jagannath Pater/ Jagannath Singh Patar	(Dampara)Ghatshila/Dhalbhum	1785-1790	Hanged	
2	Revolt of the Rajas of Dhalbhum	Subla Singh/Subal Singh	Kuilapal	1767–1770	Hanged	
3	Revolt of the Rajas of Dhalbhum	Samangunjan/ Sham Ganja	Dhadka/Barabhum pargana	1767–1771	Defeated	
4	Revolt of the Rajas of Dhalbhum	Raja Jagannath Dhal	Dhalbhum	1767	Defeated	
5	Rebellion of the Chuars	Lal Singh	Satarkhani/Barabhum	1782–1799	Defeated	
6	Rebellion of the Chuars	Durjan Singh	Raipur/Bishnupur	1798–1799	Defeated	
7	Rebellion at Bishnupur	Rani Shiromani (lady)	Karnagarh	1799–1812	Died in jail	
8	Rebellion at Bishnupur	Madhav Singha Dev	Bishnupur	1801–1809	Died in jail	
9	Rebellion at Bishnupur	Baidyanath Singh/ Baijnath Singh	Dampara/Dhalbhum	1809–1810	Defeated	
10	Revolt of Ganganarayan	Ganga Narayan	Barabhum	1830–1833	Defeated	
11	Revolt of Ganganarayan	Raghunath Singh [bn]	Dampara/Dhalbhum	1831–1834	Hanged	

== See also ==
- Bhumij rebellion
- History of Bengal
- History of Jharkhand

== Sources ==
- Das, Binod Sankar (1984). Changing Profile of the Frontier Bengal, 1751-1833. Mittal Publications.
- Jha, Jagdish Chandra (1967). The Bhumij Revolt, 1832-33: Ganga Narain's Hangama Or Turmoil. Munshiram Manoharlal.
