= Bhumij =

Bhumij may refer to:

- Bhumij people, a tribal ethnic group of India
  - Bhumij language, their Munda (Austroasiatic) language
  - Bhumij Revolt, a tribal revolt in colonial India
- Bhumija, a type of shikhara (Indian temple spire)
