= Durjan Singh =

Leader of Chuar Rebellion

- Known for: Chuar Rebellion
- Title: zamindar of Raipur estate

Durjan Singh was a great leader of Chuar Rebellion of Bengal. Singh was a zamindar of Raipur in the Bishnupur district of Bengal. He led the Chuar Rebellion in 1798–99 in Midnapore district against the British East India Company, but it was brutally crushed at its peak..

== Rebellion ==
In Bengal, the Bhumijs of Jungle Mahals were called chuars . Some of them became zamindars, and called themselves Rajas or Sardars. Their rebellions during the Company rule were called Chuar Rebellion.

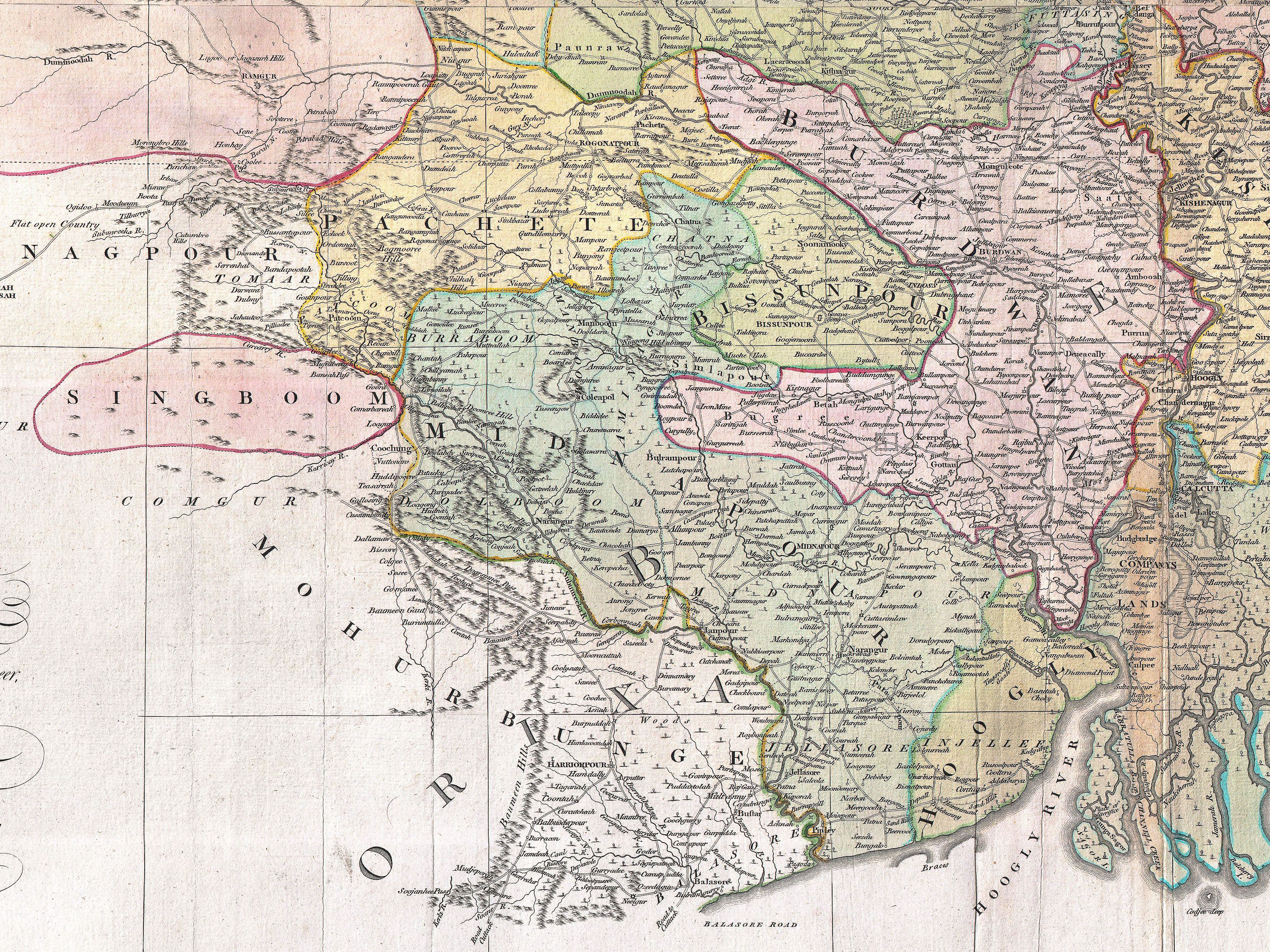
Estate of Bengal (map by Runnel, 1776)

Raja Durjan Singh was the Bhumij zamindar of Raipur, from where he was dispossessed by the British. To get back his Raipur estate, Durjan Singh joined the Chuar Rebellion started by Jagannath Singh, zamindar of Dhalbhum and attacked the British with around 15,000 of his companions and caused havoc in Raipur and surrounding areas. He was also supported by other dispossessed Bhumij zamindars, Rajas and Bagri leaders of Midnapore, Dhalbhum, Bankura including Mohan Singh, Lal Singh, Govardhan. He established his rule over 30 villages and attacked the East India Company establishments. The Chuars (Bhumijs) spread the rebellion in Raipur, Bankura, Phulkusma, Bhalaidiha, Shyamsunderpur and Simlapal.
