= Jungle Terry =

Region of British India

Coordinates: 25°00′N 86°30′E

Jungle Terry jangal tarāi
- Administrative Area of British India
- late 18th century–1805
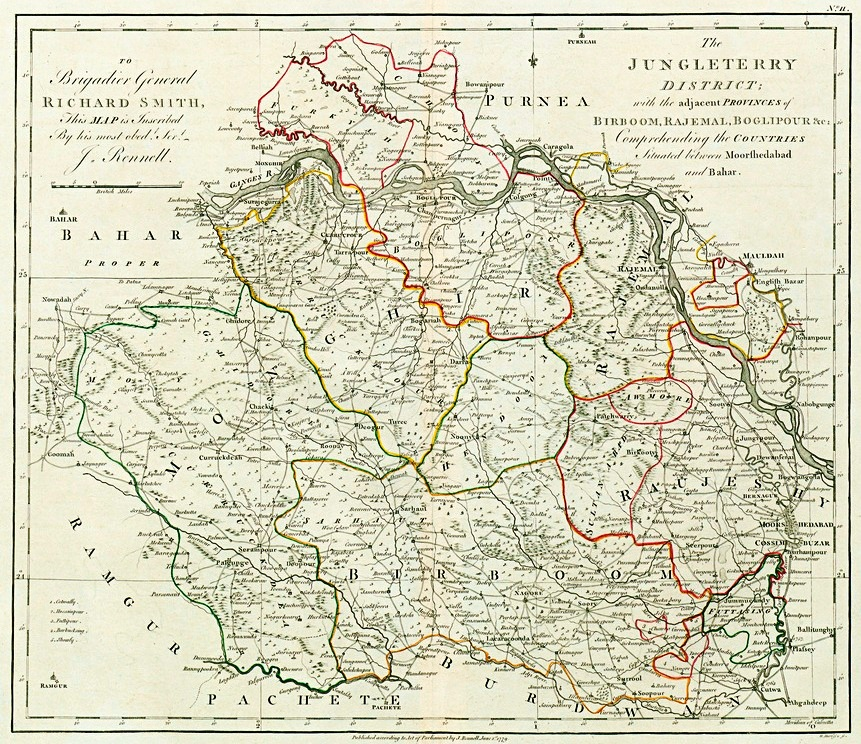
- 1779 map of the Jungle Terry District.
- History
  - Area roughly defined and mapped: late 18th century
  - Bifurcation: 1805
Succeeded by
Jungle Mahals

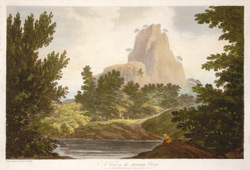
A View in the Jungle Terry by William Hodges, 1782.

Jungle Terry or Jungleterry, from Hindi: जंगल तराई jangal tarāi, meaning 'jungle lowland', was a term applied in the 18th century to an area bordering Bengal, Bihar and Jharkhand that included large tracts of Bhagalpur and Monghyr districts, as well as the Santal Parganas district.

Although named as such, rather than an official district, the Jungle Terry was a vague border area. The district named Jungle Mahals would be established later in 1805.

== Geography ==
The Jungle Terry was located in the present-day Indian states of West Bengal, Bihar and Jharkhand. It was an ill-defined thickly forested region inhabited by tribal groups, such as the Bhumij, the Santhal and the Munda people. William Hodges mentions that the Jungle Terry was located to the west of Bauglepore (Bhagalpur).

The area included the Rajmahal Hills; towns that were close to the area, according to James Browne, included, besides Bauglepoor or Boglypour (Bhagalpur), Curruckpoor (Haveli Kharagpur), Colgong (Kahalgaon), Birboom (Birbhum), Curruckdea (Kharagdiha) and Guidore (Gidhaur).

Map number two of James Rennell's 1779 Bengal Atlas has the title "Jungleterry District", but the name 'Jungle Terry' itself does not show on the map. Bishop Reginald Heber comments that the "Jungleterry" district is very fertile and that theft, murder and highway robberies are a rare occurrence in it.

== See also ==
- Jungle Mahals
