= Bhumij people =

Ethnic group of India

Bhumij
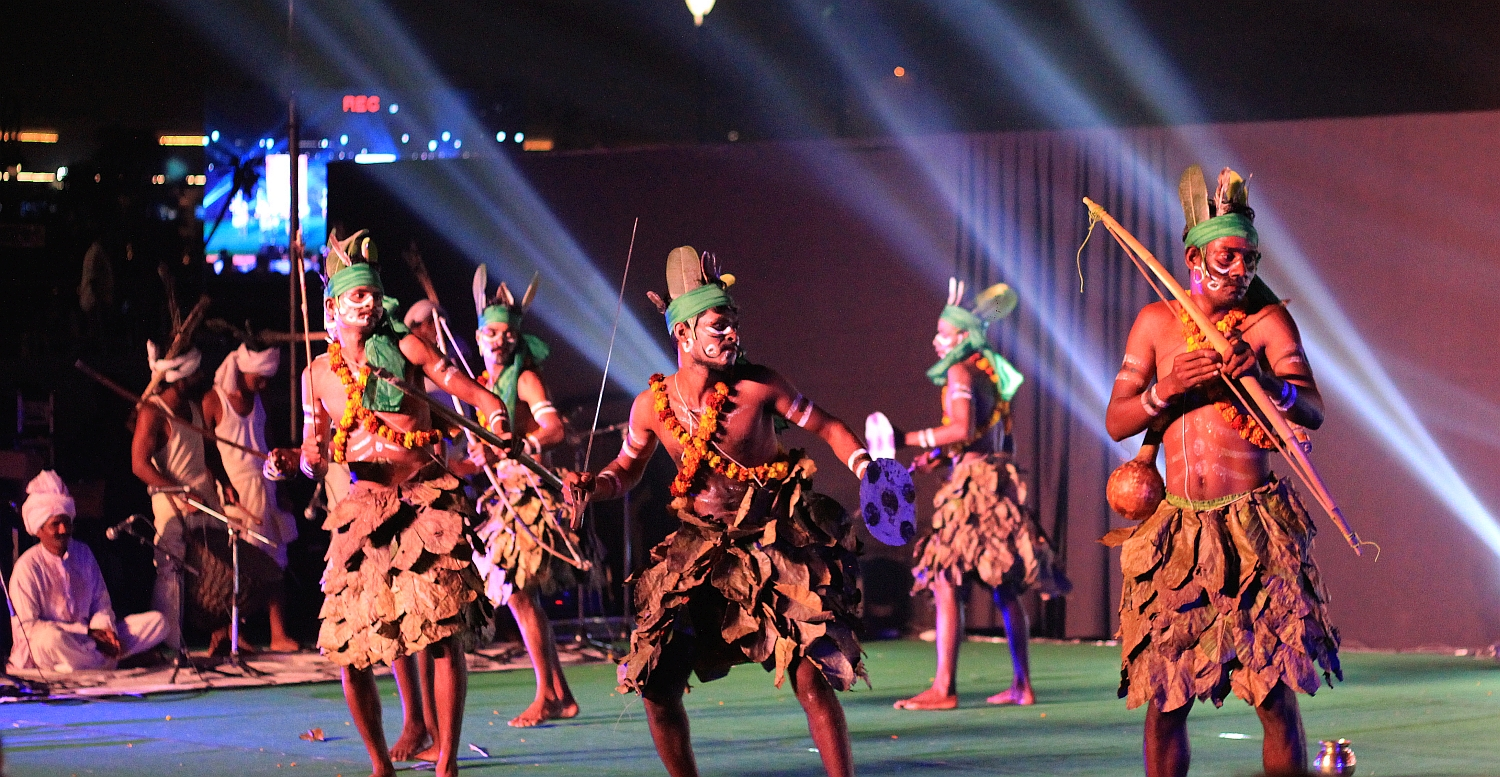
- Firkal dance performed by Bhumij people

Total population
- c. 1 million (Note: The Bhumij are recognized as Scheduled Tribes in three states: Jharkhand, Odisha, and West Bengal, with a population of 869,653 according to the 2011 census. However, Bhumij residing in other administrative states and countries are not individually counted in the census; thus, colonial census figures are used to estimate their current total population.) (2011, est.)

Regions with significant populations
- India, Bangladesh
- West Bengal: 376,296
- Odisha: 283,909
- Jharkhand: 209,448
- Bihar: 1,567
- Assam: 72,003 (1951, est.)
- Tripura: 755 (1951, est.)
- Bangladesh: 9,664 (2021)

Languages
- Bhumij • Regional languages

Religion
- Sarnaism • Hinduism

Related ethnic groups
- Munda • Kol • Ho • Santal

Bhumij (also transliterated as Bhumuj) is a Munda ethnic group of India. They primarily live in the Indian states of West Bengal, Odisha, Assam and Jharkhand, mostly in the old Singhbhum district and also in states like Bihar and Assam. A sizeable population is also found in Bangladesh. Bhumijas speak the Bhumij language, an Austroasiatic language, and use Ol Onal script for writing.

== Overview ==
=== Etymology ===
Bhumij means "one who is born from the soil" and it is derived from word bhūmi (a land or soil). According to N. Ramaswani, the word is etymologically Bhūm-jo meaning "people originating from Bhum areas, i.e. Singhbhum, Dhalbhum, Manbhum, Barabhum, etc.", Dalton also had claimed that Bhumijs were the original inhabitants of Dhalbhum, Barabhum, Patkum and Baghmundi.

=== Social structure ===
The social structure of the Bhumijas is characterized by its dynamism, incorporating both tribal traits inherited from their parent tribe, the Munda, and elements from caste-based society. During the colonial period, they were often labeled as Hinduized or semi-Hinduized tribes, and sometimes even identified as a distinct caste. In modern times, the Bhumij form part of the tribe-caste continuum society. Their society is characterised by nuclear family, patriliny, exogamy and hereditary headship of the village community. They follow Hindu practices of succession and inheritance. The Bhumij are divided into several geographical endogamous groups based on ancestral territory and occupation, such as Tamaliya, Na-gadi, Astha, Choto Astha in Jharkhand; Barah Bhuiyan, Deshua, Haldi Pukhria, Tamadia Sikharia, Tharua in Odisha; Borabhui, Mura, Mura bhumij, Chaibasa mura, Khanga mura, Kumpat mura, Manki bhumij in Assam; Bara, Bhoogol, Bhuiya, Kada kata, Manki, Nag, Patkumia, Sing in Tripura. In Mayurbhanj, segmentary Bhumija group are Tamaria Bhumij, Tamudia (this subgroup earlier notified as a Schedule Caste of Odisha), Haldipukuria Bhumij, Teli Bhumij, Desi or Dehuri Bhumij, Barah Bhuiyan Bhumij and Kol Bhumij.

=== Genetics ===
According to genetic study conducted on Bhumij population on 2010, it was found that their 70% Y Haplogroups belongs to O2a-M95 found among population of Southeast Asia and Austro-Asiatic language speaker and rest belongs to Haplogroups found in India. Their mitrocondrial Haplogroups belongs Haplogroup M (mtDNA) found in Indian subcontinent.

=== Geographic distribution ===
Distribution of Bhumij people, 2011 census

The Bhumij are primarily inhabitants of Jharkhand, West Bengal, Odisha, Assam, and Bihar. Specifically they are thickly concentrated in East Singhbhum, Saraikela kharsawan district of Jharkhand; Purulia, Bankura, Midnapore and 24 Parganas district of West Bengal; Mayurbhanj, Sundargarh, Keonjhar, and Balasore district of Odisha and sporadically distributed in other parts those states. In Assam, where they are very recent immigrants, their greatest concentration occurs in the Assam valley. Bhumijs are also found sporadically in Chhattisgarh, Tripura, Arunachal Pradesh, Andaman and Nicobar, Meghalaya, Manipur, Delhi, Maharashtra, Andhra Pradesh and Madhya Pradesh.

In Bangladesh, the Bhumij people came to the Sylhet region from Bihar as tea-labourers. They can be found in Srimangal with a population of 3000. The Bhumijs lives in Sylhet, Rajshahi, Khulna, Srimangal, Dhaka and Chittagong regions. They are divided into many clans (killi) such as Kaitra, Garur, Kasim, Bhugal, Baundra, Ban, Nag, Shona, Shar, Tresha, etc. Their Bhumij dialect is less and less spoken and Bengali is more widely spoken among the community.

== History ==
Bhumij means "one who is born from the soil".

While those living nearer to Chota Nagpur Plateau still retain linguistic links with Mundari, those living further east and south have adopted Bengali and Oriya as their languages respectively. In Dhalbhum they are completely Hinduised. During British rule, or sometimes even earlier, many of the Bhumij became zamindars and some even secured the title of Raja. Others were called Sardar. However, all of them, having climbed the social ladder, proclaimed themselves to be Kshatriyas, in keeping with the trends in the region.

=== Bhumij rebellion ===
The people in the surrounding areas were quite scared of them. The well known Chuar revolt, a series of peasant rebellions started between 1766 and 1816 by the inhabitants of the countryside surrounding the West Bengali settlements of Midnapore, Bankura and Manbhum against the rule of the East India Company (EIC). The rebels rose in revolt due to the exploitative land revenue policies of the EIC, which threatened their economic livelihoods. According to L.S.S. O’Malley, an EIC administrator who wrote the Bengal District Gazetteer, "In March 1766 Government resolved to send an expedition into the country west and north-west of Midnapore in order to coerce them into paying revenue, and to capture and demolish as many of their strongholds as possible." Amongst the many dispossessed Bhumij zamindars, those who lent support to the rebels included royalty such as Jagannath Singh of Dhalbhum, Durjan Singh of Raipur, Baidyanath Singh of Dhalbhum, Mangal Singh of Panchet, Lakshman Singh of Barabhum, Raghunath Singh of Dhalbhum, Ganga Narayan of Barabhum, Rani Shiromani of Karnagarh, Raja Madhu Singh of Manbhum, Subal Singh of Kuilapal, Shyam Ganjam Singh of Dhadka, Raja Mohan Singh of Juriah, Lakshman Singh of Dulma, Sunder Narayana Singh and Phateh Singh.

== Culture ==
They also practice the martial art called Firkal, although it has been reduced to a single village among the Bhumij who perform it.

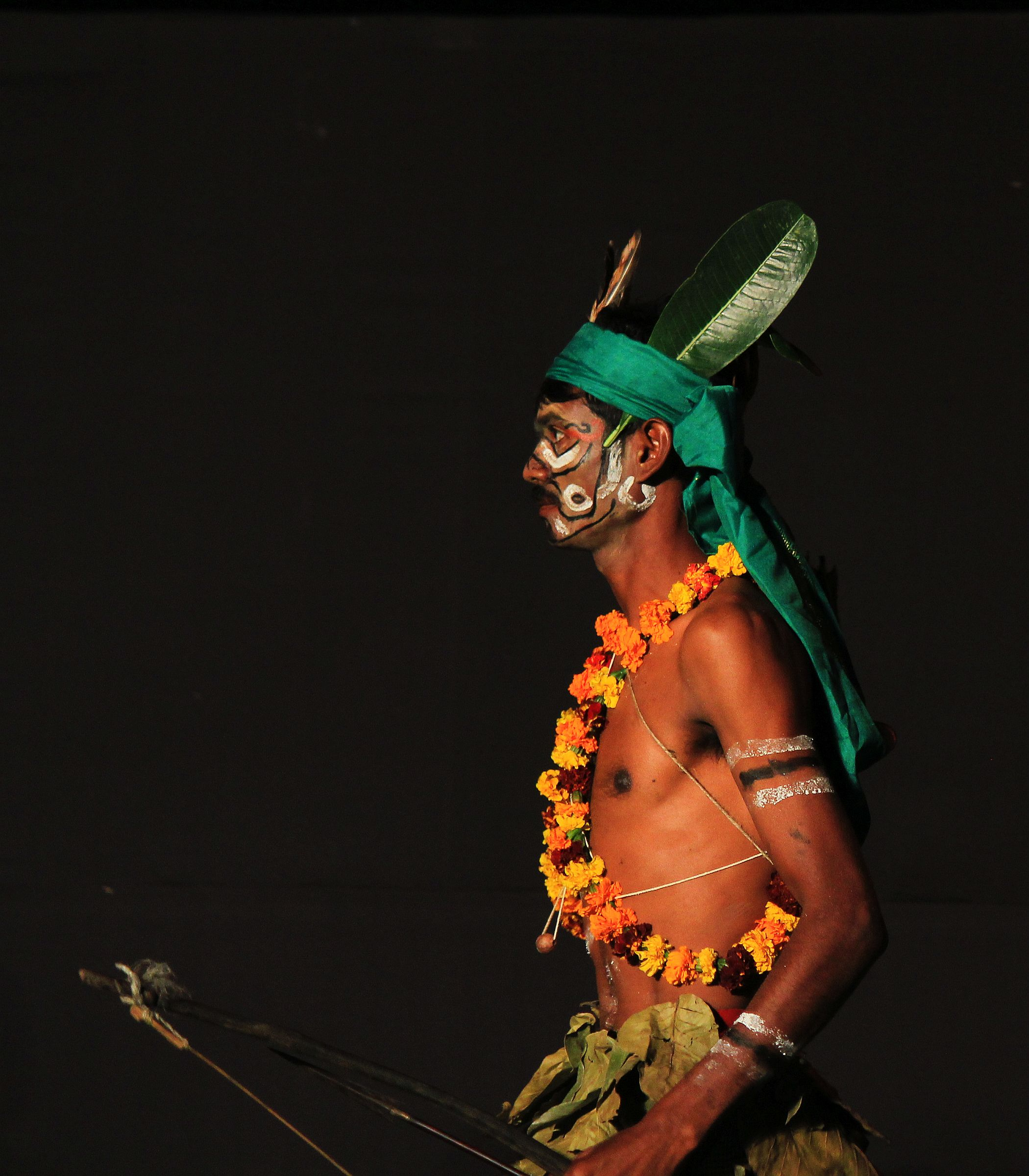
Firkal slowly displaying martial dance of ChotaNagpur of Jharkhand

=== Language ===
Bhumij is the language of the Munda subfamily of the Austroasiatic languages, related to Ho, Mundari and Santali, spoken mainly in the Indian states Jharkhand, Odisha and West Bengal. It is spoken by around 100,000 people in India. Though many Bhumijs in West Bengal and Orissa are speaking Bengali and Odia respectively as their first language.

In January 2019, Bhumij was accorded the status of second language in the state of Jharkhand.

== Religion and festivals ==
The followers of Sarnaism among the Bhumij have been organising protests and petitions to have their religion recognised by the government of India in census forms.

== Official classification ==
Bhumijas have been designated as Scheduled Tribes in only three states—Odisha, Jharkhand, and West Bengal—by the Government of India. In Bihar, they are recognized as Scheduled Castes [sic], and in Tripura and Assam (as the Ex-tea garden community), they fall under the category of Other Backward Classes. Those residing in other states and countries are considered part of the general population. However, the Bhumij were classified as Scheduled Castes before the Scheduled Castes and Scheduled Tribes Lists (Modification) Order of 1956. Until 2024, the Tamudia segment of the Bhumij tribe was designated as Scheduled Caste in Odisha, but it was subsequently recognized as Scheduled Tribes.

== Notable people ==
- Durga Bhumij - politician
- Haren Bhumij - politician
- Jogeswar Bhumij - cricketer
- Pranjal Bhumij - footballer
- Gambhir Singh Mura - Padma Shri recipient and tribal Chhau dancer
- Amulya Sardar - politician
- Hari Ram Sardar - politician
- Maneka Sardar - politician
- Sanatan Sardar - tribal leader and politician
- Sanjib Sardar - politician
- Rani Shiromani - queen of Karnagarh and leader of Chuar rebellion
- Baidyanath Singh - leader of Chuar Rebellion
- Durjan Singh - leader of Chuar Rebellion
- Ganga Narayan Singh - leader of Bhumij rebellion and Chuar Rebellion
- Jagannath Singh Patar - leader of Chuar Rebellion
- Raghunath Singh - leader of Chuar Rebellion
- Shyam Ganjam Singh - leader of Chuar Rebellion
- Subal Singh - leader of Chuar Rebellion

== See also ==
- Bhumij language
- Ganga Narayan Singh
- Bhumij rebellion
- Chuar Rebellion
- Ol Onal
