= Telanga Kharia =

Indian tribal freedom fighter (1806–1880)

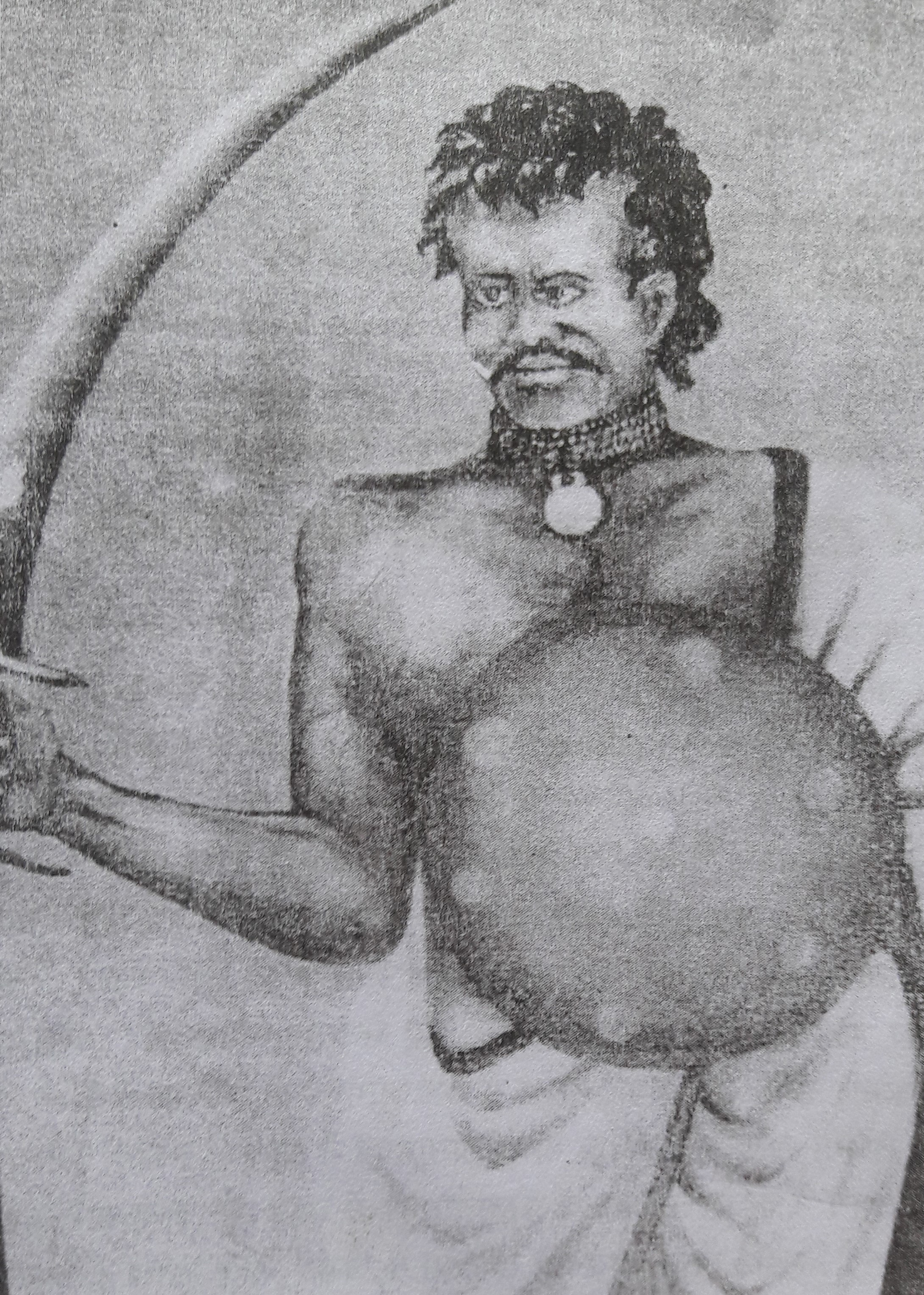
- Born: 9 February 1806

Telanga Kharia (1806–1880) was a great Indian tribal freedom fighter, who spearheaded a rebellion against the British Raj in Chotanagpur Region during 1850–1860.

== Movement against the British Raj ==
He started to organise people and create awareness among them. He created Jury Panchayat in many villages, which worked as self-governance rule parallel to the British rule. There were 13 Jury Panchayats formed by Telanga Kharia, which were spread across Sisai, Gumla, Basia, Simdega, Kumhari, Kolebira, Chainpur, Mahabuang and Bano area.
