= Haludpukur =

Haludpukur Haludpukhur, Haldipokhar
- Census Town
- Location in Jharkhand, India Haludpukur (India)
- Coordinates: 22.6101°N 86.1385°E
- Country: India
- State: Jharkhand
- District: East Singhbhum

Area
  - Total: 6.35 km^{2} (2.45 sq mi)

Population (2011)
  - Total: 10,485
  - Density: 1,650/km^{2} (4,280/sq mi)

Languages*
  - Official: Hindi, Urdu
- Time zone: UTC+5:30 (IST)
- PIN: 831002
- Telephone/STD code: 0657
- Vehicle registration: JH 05
- Literacy: 78.97%
- Lok Sabha constituency: Jamshedpur
- Vidhan Sabha constituency: Potka
- Website: jamshedpur.nic.in

Haludpukur (also referred to as Haludpukhur, Haldipokhar) is a census town in the Potka CD block in the Dhalbhum subdivision of the East Singhbhum district in the Indian state of Jharkhand.

== Geography ==
Cities, towns and locations in East Singhbhum district in Kolhan Division (Locations around Jamshedpur are shown in the Jamshedpur Urban Agglomeration map - see Bagbera Colony page)
M: municipality, R: rural/ urban centre, CT: census town, T: tourist centre
Owing to space constraints in the small map, the actual locations in a larger map may vary slightly

=== Location ===
Haldipokhar is located at 22.6101°N 86.1385°E.

=== Area overview ===
The area shown in the map "forms a part of the Chota Nagpur Plateau and is a hilly upland tract". The main rivers draining the district are the Subarnarekha and the Kharkai. The area lying between Jamshedpur and Ghatshila is the main industrial mining zone. The rest of the district is primarily agricultural. In the district, as of 2011, 56.9% of the population lives in the rural areas and a high 43.1% lives in the urban areas.

Note: The map alongside presents some of the notable locations in the district. All places marked in the map are linked in the larger full screen map.

== Demographics ==
According to the 2011 Census of India, Haludpukhur had a total population of 10,485, of which 5,317 (51%) were males and 5,168 (49%) were females. Population in the age range 0–6 years was 1,517. The total number of literate persons in Haludpukhur was 7,082 (78.97% of the population over 6 years).

=== Language ===
Languages spoken in Haludpukur census town (2011)
1. Urdu (48.1%)
2. Bengali (34.8%)
3. Hindi (10.9%)
4. Odia (4.90%)
5. Mundari (0.60%)
6. Munda (0.30%)
7. Other (0.40%)

=== Religion ===
Religions in Haludpukur town (2011)
Religion	Percent
Islam	50.1%
Hinduism	46.5%
Unclassified Sect.	2.9%
Christianity	0.1%
Not stated	0.4%

== Infrastructure ==
According to the District Census Handbook 2011, Purbi Singhbhum, Haludpukhur covered an area of 6.35 km^{2} (2.45 sq mi). It has an annual rainfall of 1,030.2 mm (40.56 in). Among the civic amenities, it had 5 km (3.1 mi) of roads with open drains, the protected water supply involved hand pump, uncovered well. It had 1,741 domestic electric connections, 4 road lighting points. Among the medical facilities, it had 1 hospital (with 10 beds), 35 dispensaries, 35 health centres, 10 family welfare centres, 10 maternity and child welfare centres, 7 maternity homes, 2 nursing homes, 12 charitable hospitals/ nursing homes, 1 veterinary hospital, 4 medicine shops. Among the educational facilities it had 1 primary school, 4 middle schools, 2 secondary schools, 1 senior secondary school, the nearest general degree college at Karandih, 16 km (9.9 mi) away. It had 1 non-formal education centre (Sarva Shiksha Abhiyan). Among social, cultural and recreational facilities, it had 1 stadium, 1 auditorium/ community hall. It produced bamboo baskets and leaf plates. It had the branch offices of 2 nationalised banks, 1 cooperative bank, 1 agricultural credit society.

== Transport ==
Haludpukur Railway Station is on the Tatanagar-Badampahar branch line.

== Education ==
Government Vidyaniketan Haldipokhar is a Hindi-medium coeducational institution established in 1960. It has facilities for teaching from class IX to class XII. The school has a playground and a library with 3,500 books, and has 2 computers for teaching and learning purposes.

Giri Bharati High School Haldipokhar is a Hindi-medium coeducational institution established in 1948. It has facilities for teaching in classes IX and X. The school has a playground, a library with 2,640 books and 1 computer for teaching and learning purposes.
