= Ganga Narayan Singh =

Indian revolutionary (1790–1833)

- Statue of Ganga Narayan at Belpahari
- Born: 25 April 1790; Bandhdih
- Died: 7 February 1833 (aged 42); Kharsawan, British India
- Known for: Bhumij Revolt

Ganga Narayan Singh (also spelled as Ganga Narain Singh and Gunga Narain Sing) (25 April 1790 – 7 February 1833) was a rebel from the Jungle Mahals who was the leader of Bhumij rebellion. He led a revolt against the East India Company in 1832-33. The British called it "Ganga Narain's Hangama", while some historians have called it the Chuar rebellion.

== Biography ==
=== Early life and background ===
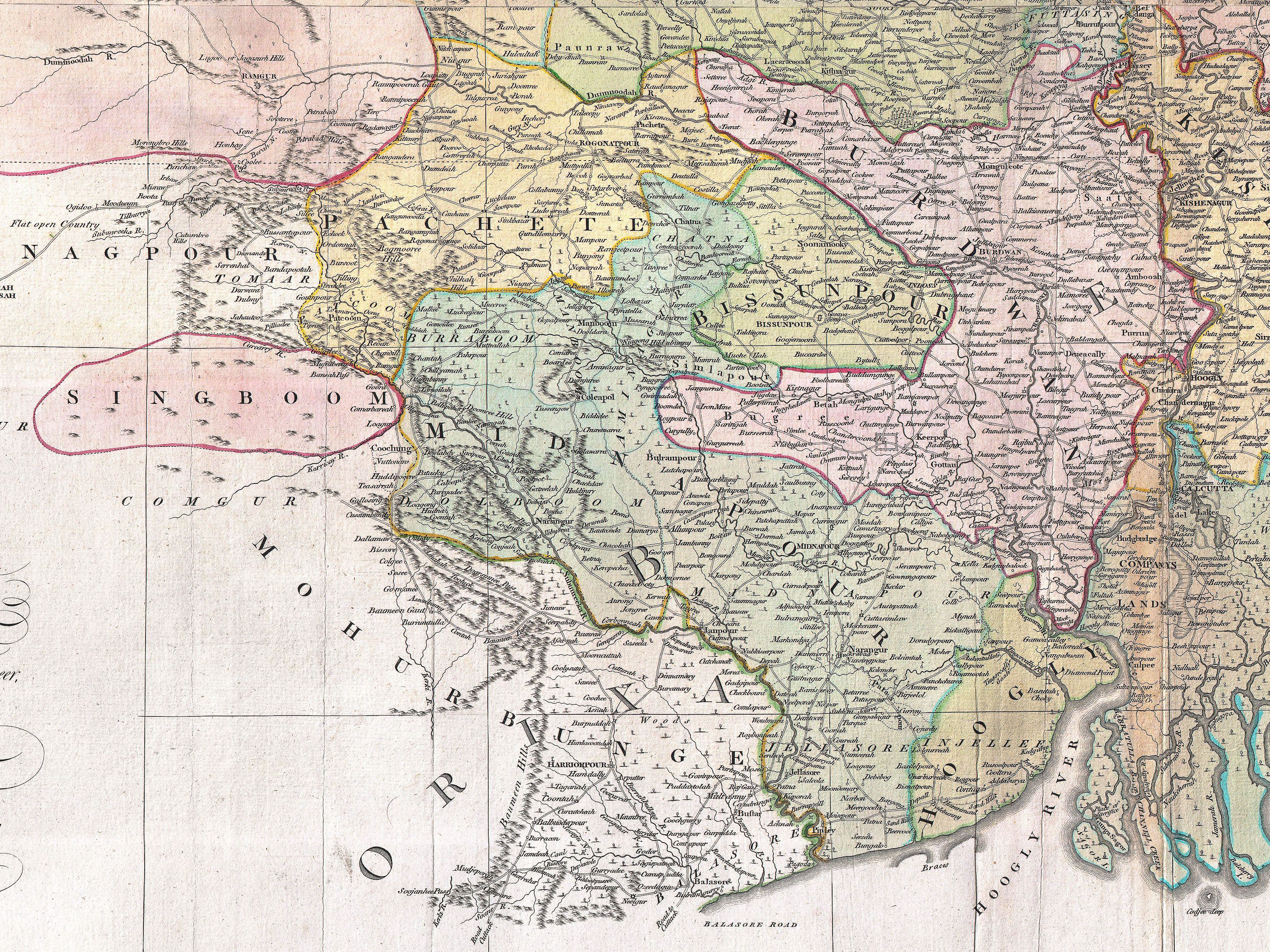
Barabhum on James Rennell's 1776 map.

Ganga Narayan was born on 25 April 1790 at Bandhdhih village. His father was Lachman Singh, and his grandfather was Vivek Narayan, the Raja of Barabhum. He had a brother named Shyamlal Singh.

=== Barabhum Raj ===
Vivek Narayan, the Raja of Barabhum, had two queens. Two queens had two sons. After the death of Raja Vivek Narayan in the 18th century, there was a struggle for successor between two sons Lachhuman Singh and Raghunath Narayan.

According to the traditional Rajput system, Lachman Singh, the son of the elder queen, was the only one who had the succession. But a long family dispute started after the British recognized the younger son Raghunath Narayan as the Raja. The local Bhumij sardars used to support Lachman Singh. Lachman Singh was expelled from the state. Lachman Singh was given the jagir of Bandhdih village for his livelihood, where his only job was to look after the Bandhadih Ghat.

After Raja Raghunath Narayan death in 1798, the Sadar Diwani Adalat settled the family dispute in favour of his elder son, Ganga Govinda Singh. Madhav Singh later reconciled with his brother and became his diwan. Lachman Singh’s son, Ganga Narayan Singh, deprived of the Panch Sardari estate following his father’s imprisonment and death in Medinipur jail, later led a revolt against Raja Ganga Govinda Singh and Diwan Madhav Singh.

=== The Family Tree of the Rajas of Barabhum ===
Raja Vivek Narayan (Raja Balak Narayan)
Lachhuman Singh	Raja Raghunath Narayan
Raja Ganga Narayan	Shyamlal Singh	Dewan Madhab Singh	Raja Ganga Govinda Singh

== Rebellion ==
In 1765, after acquiring the Diwani of Bengal, Bihar, and Orissa, the East India Company imposed harsh revenue policies that exploited the poor farmers of Jungle Mahals, including regions like Manbhum, Barahbhum, and Singhbhum. These measures included salt taxes, land sales, and forest laws, as well as the introduction of moneylenders and land auctions, all of which worsened the plight of the tribal population. This exploitation sparked resentment, particularly among the Bhumijs, and led to widespread discontent in the region.

Ganga Narayan, a prominent leader from Jungle Mahal, organized a rebellion in 1832 against the British policies oppressing farmers. With his formation of the Sardar Guerrilla Vahini army, which garnered support from various local castes and tribal groups, he led a series of attacks against British forces and their collaborators. His movement gained momentum, culminating in significant victories across Bengal, Jharkhand, and Orissa, and forcing the British to withdraw oppressive laws. However, despite his early successes, Ganga Narayan was ultimately killed in battle on February 7, 1833, but his legacy as a hero of resistance against British rule endured, inspiring future struggles for freedom.

== See also ==
- Bhumij rebellion
- Chuar rebellion
