= Patkum estate =

Princely estate of British India

- Zamindari of British India
- 12th century–1947
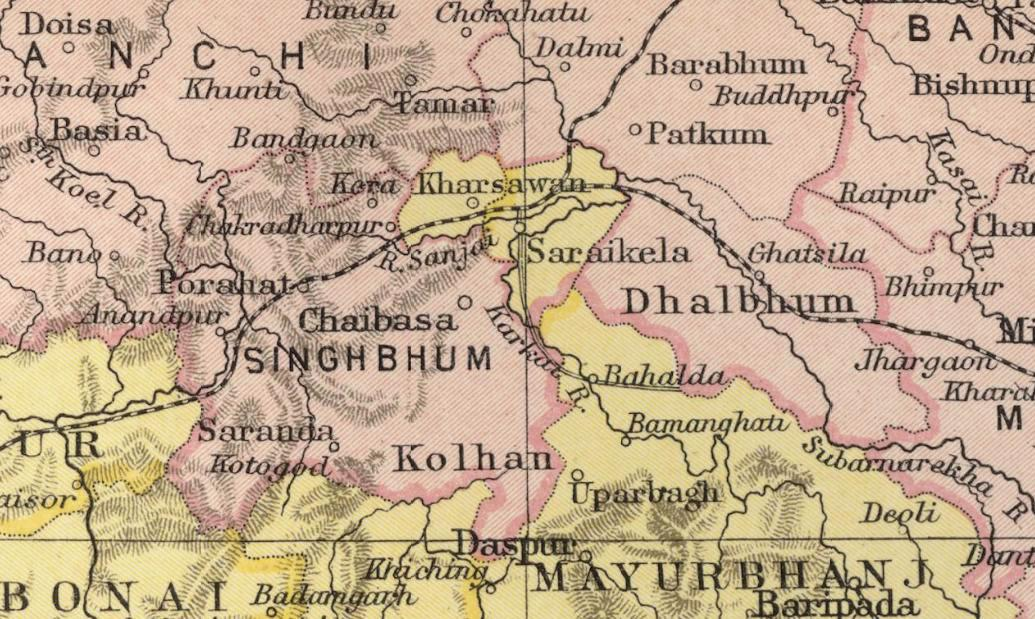
- Patkum region in a 1901 map of the Imperial Gazetteer of India.
- Capital: Ichagarh
- Demonym: Patkumia
- History
  - Established: 12th century
  - Accession to the Union of India: 1947
Preceded by	Succeeded by
Bengal Presidency	India
- Today part of: Jharkhand, India

Patkum estate (also romanised as Patkam, Patkom and Patcoom in early record) was one of the zamindari estates of India during the period of the British Raj. It is believed that the estate was found by scion of the King Vikramaditya of Solar dynasty. During British raj it was part of Bengal presidency, composing today's Chandil, Kukru, Nimdih, Ichagarh and Kandra. Ichagarh was the capital of the state.

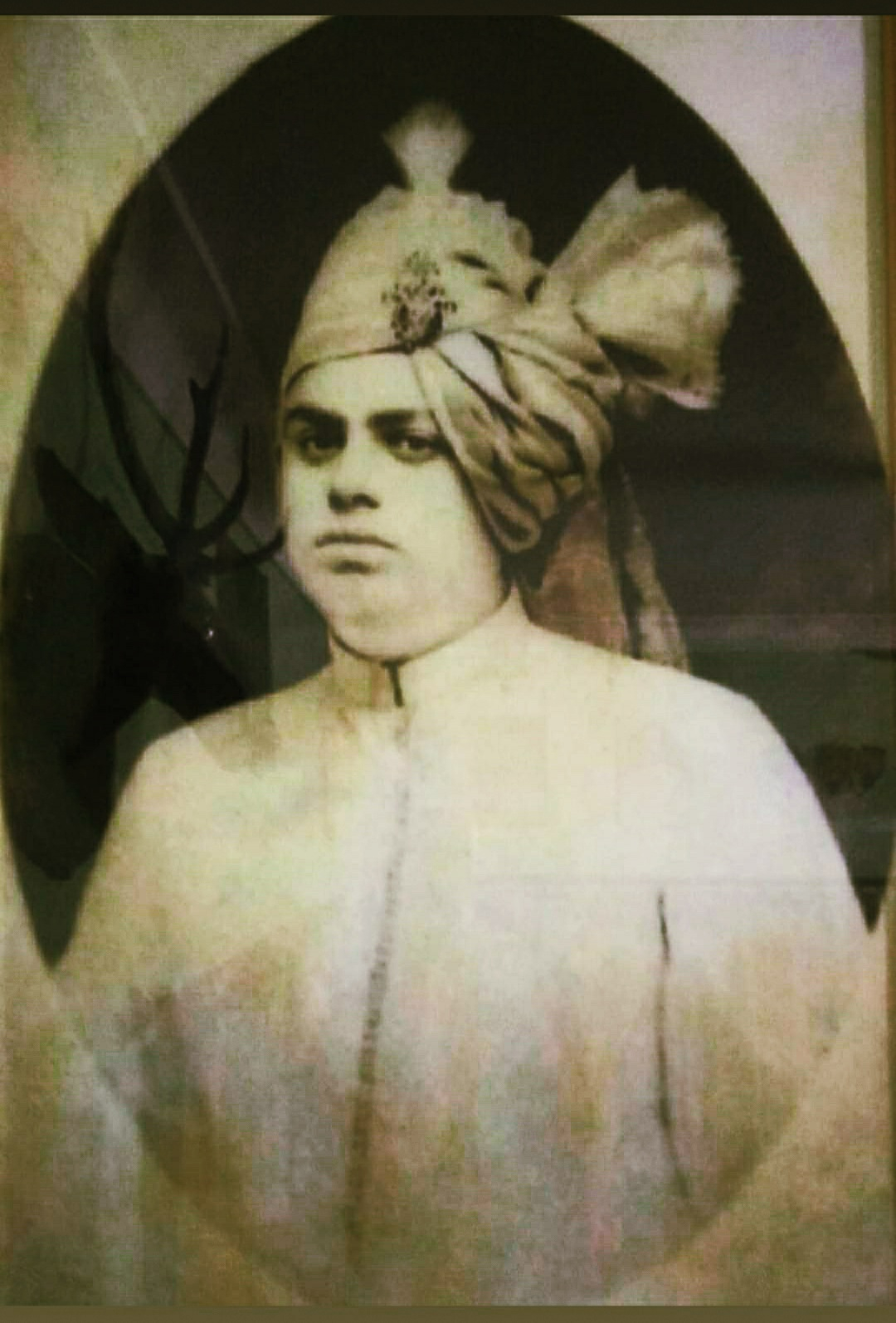
Shatrughan Aditya Deo, the raja of Patkum estate.

== Etymology ==
The name Patkum derived from dialect of aboriginal people. The capital of the estate Ichagarh derived from icha means wish and garh. The capital named after wish of queen.

== History ==
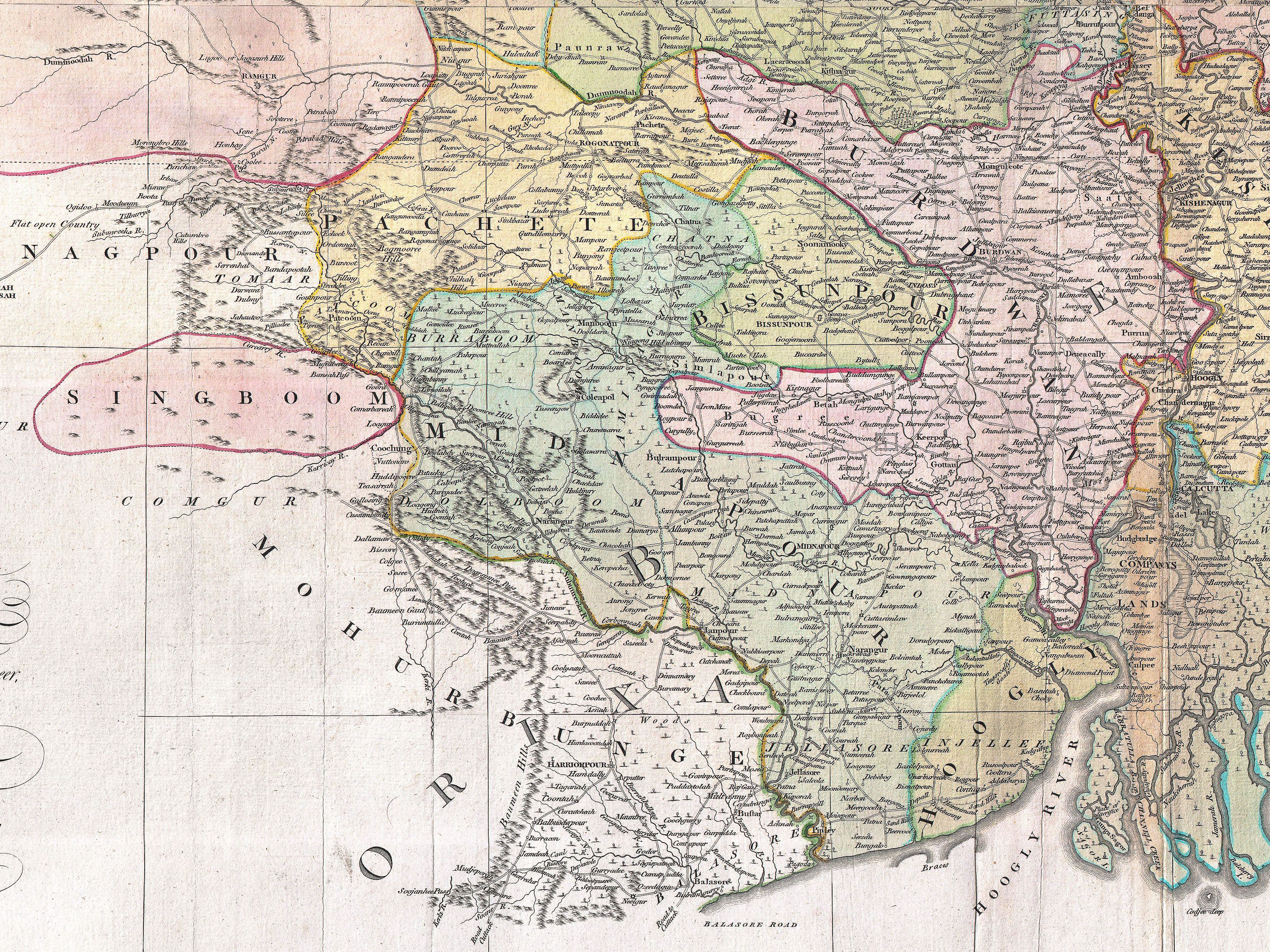
Patkum under Panchet administration on James Rennell's Mid-18th Century map.

The Patkum zamindari estate was initially part of the extensive Midnapore district until the late 18th century. Subsequently, it became a part of the Birbhum district until 1805 when it was integrated into the Jungle Mahals. Later, it transitioned to Panchet and then to the Manbhum district of British India. After India gained independence, the region came under the jurisdiction of Bihar province. However, due to the 1953 State Reorganization, the Patkum territory underwent a partition, with some areas being allocated to Bihar (present-day Jharkhand) and others to West Bengal states.
