= Porahat =

Coordinates: 22°36′N 85°26′E

- Village
- Interactive map of Porahat
- Country: India
- State: Jharkhand

Government
  - Type: Sabha
  - Body: Monarch

Languages
  - Official: Hindi, Santali, HO
- Time zone: UTC+5:30 (IST)
- Postal code: 833102
- Vehicle registration: JH 06

Porahat is a village in West Singhbhum district of Jharkhand state in eastern India. Before Indian independence in 1947, it was the capital of a zamindari of British India. Porahat Forest Division is named after this village.

Forest divisions in West Singhbum are:

- Saranda Forest Division
- Kolhan Forest Division
- Porahat Forest Division
- Chaibasa (South) Forest Division

== Sources ==
- Taylor, James H. (1904). Final Report on the Survey and Settlement Operations in the Porahat Estate, District Singhbhum, 1900-1903. Bengal Secretariat Press. OCLC 140060257. Alt URL
