= Jungle Mahals =

British Raj areas in West Bengal

Coordinates: 23°20′N 86°22′E

- District of British India
- 1805–1833
- Flag
- Capital: Chhatna
- Area
  - 1822: 18,103 km^{2} (6,990 sq mi)
- Population
  - 1822: 1,304,740
- History
  - Established: 1805
  - Bifurcation: 1833
Preceded by
Birbhum district
Burdwan district
Midnapore district
Succeeded by
South-West Frontier Agency

Jungle Mahals (lit. jungle estates) was a district formed by British possessions and some independent chiefdoms lying between Birbhum, Burdwan, Midnapore and the hilly country of Chota Nagpur in what is now the Indian state of West Bengal. The district was located in the area known as the Jungle Terry.

== Background ==
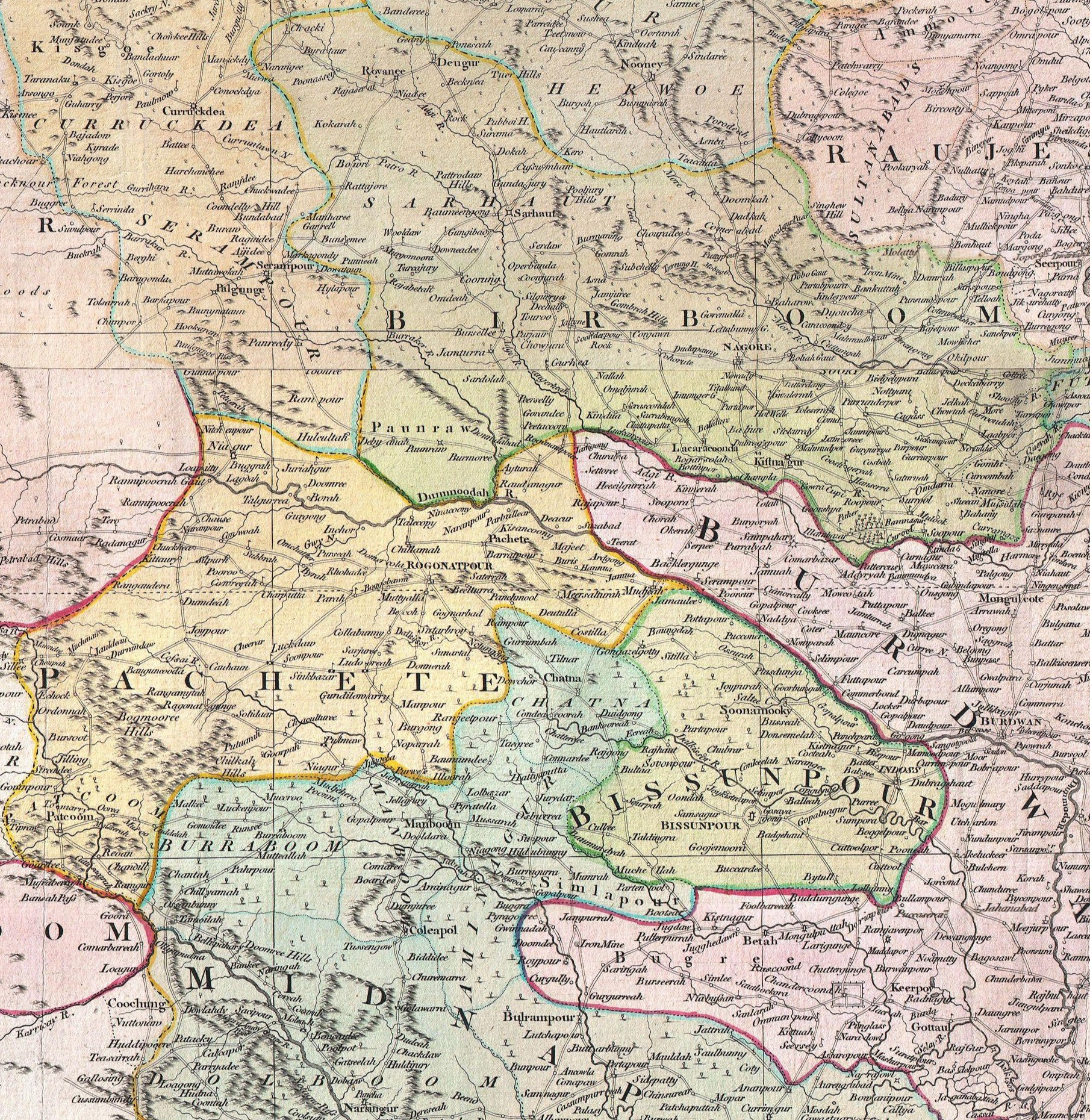
The Jungle Mahals area as depicted on a 1776 map by James Rennell.

The Chuar Rebellion was a series of uprisings by the tribal communities in the Jungle Mahals region against the oppressive policies of the British East India Company. The British referred to the rebels as "Chuars," meaning "barbaric," due to their resistance to land revenue collection. The rebellion spread across Midnapore, Bishnupur, and Manbhum district, peaking in 1798-1799. In response to the unrest, the British reorganized the region, establishing the Jungle Mahals district and implementing stricter administrative control. The legacy of the rebellion influenced the socio-political identity of the region.

== History ==
=== Established ===
The vagueness of the jurisdiction caused inconvenience. In 1805, the new district of Jungle Mahals was created by a regulation (Regulation XVIII of 1805), comprising areas from Birbhum (the 1787 British district incorporating Bishnupur), Burdwan, and Midnapore, and placed under the jurisdiction of a new Magistrate.

According to L.S.S. O'Malley, the district that was formed consisted of 23 parganas and Mahals.

Jungle Mahals District 1805–1833
District transferred from Birbhum	District transferred from Burdwan	District transferred from Midnapore
Panchet	Senpahari	Chhatna
Bagmundy	Shergarh	Barabhum
Jhalda	Bishnupur	Manbhum
Jharia	Balsye	Supur
Patkum		Ambikanagar
Unknown		Simlapal
Unknown		Bhalaidiha
Unknown		
Unknown		
Unknown		

=== Jungle Mahal Uprising ===
In 1832–33, the Jungle Mahal Uprising, also known as the Ganga Narayan Hungama, was led by Ganga Narayan in the Manbhum and Jungle Mahal areas of the erstwhile Midnapore district, Bengal, by Bhumij tribals.

=== Disestablished ===
By Regulation XIII of 1833, the district of Jungle Mahals was broken up, and a new administrative unit known as the South-West Frontier Agency was formed. The estates of Senpahari, Shergarh and Bishnupur were transferred to Burdwan District and the remainder constituted the Manbhum District.

South-West Frontier Agency
Estates transferred from Jungle Mahals
Burdwan District	Manbhum District
Senpahari	Dhalbhum
Shergarh	Chhatna
Bishnupur	Barabhum
	Manbhum
	Supur
	Ambikanagar
	Simlapal
	Bhalaidiha
	Balsye
	Panchet
	Bagmundy
	Jhalda
	Jharia
	Patkum
	Other estates

== Statehood demand ==
In 2021, Saumitra Khan, Lok Sabha BJP MP demanded the creation of Junglemahal state consisting of Purulia, Jhargram, Bankura, parts of Birbhum, Purbo Medinipur, Paschim Medinipur and along with some other areas. He claimed that the Junglemahal area is least developed and the demands of employment and development for locals could be met only if it gets statehood.

The West Bengal state BJP unit, however, distanced itself from the Junglemahal statehood demand. A Trinamool Congress leader filed a complaint against Saumitra Khan for demanding statehood for Junglemahal.

== See also ==
- Chhota Nagpur Division
- Jungle Terry
