= Chota Nagpur Division =

Administrative division of British India

Coordinates: 23°00′N 85°00′E

- Division of British India
- 1854–1912
- Flag

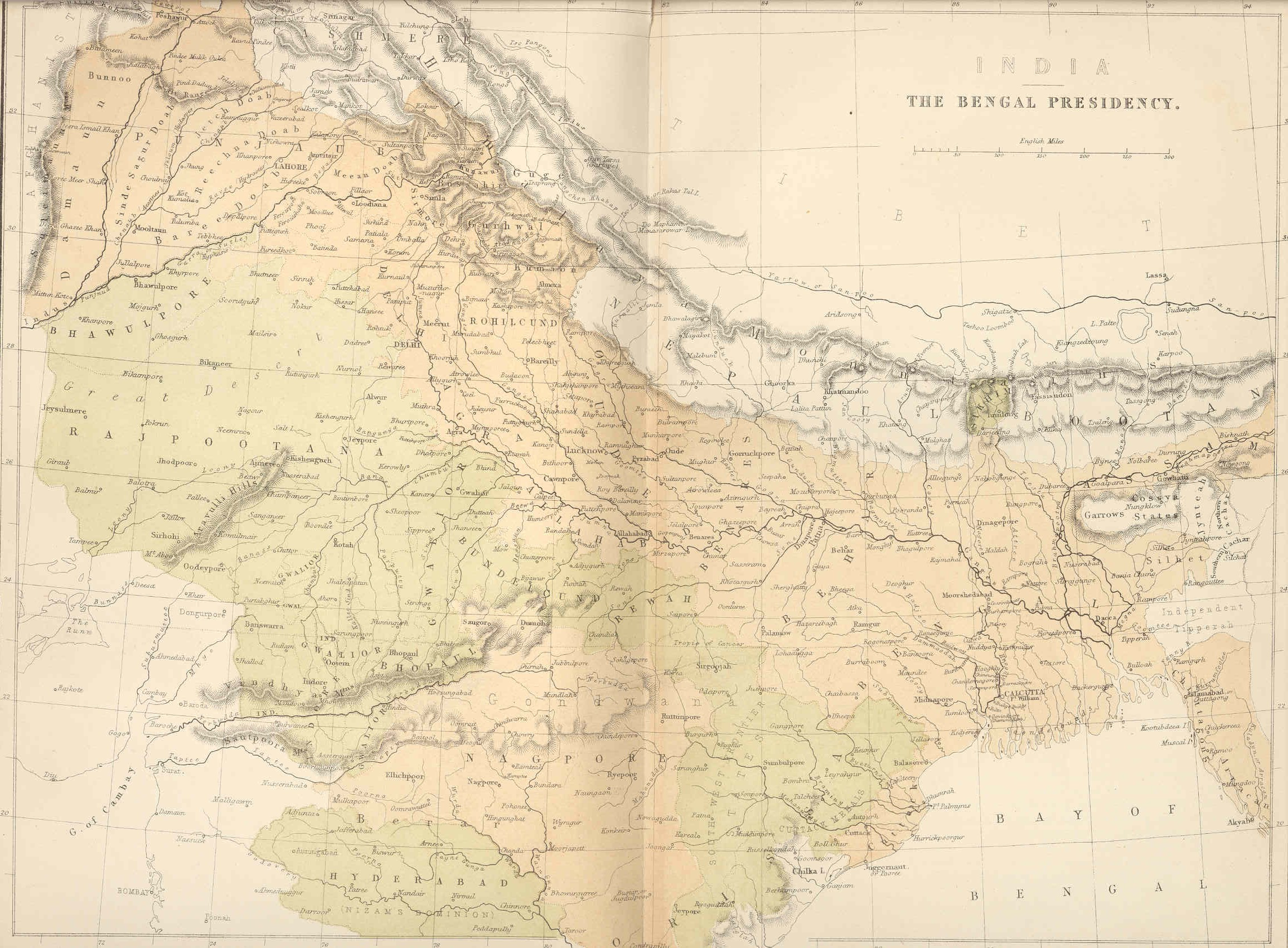
- 1858 map of the Bengal Presidency
- Capital: Ranchi
- Area
  - 1901: 70,161 km^{2} (27,089 sq mi)
- Population
  - 1901: 4,900,429
- Government
- Commissioner
  - 1854-1859: Mr. J. H. Crawford
  - 1853-1854: Mr. W. J Allen
  - 1866: Edward Tuite Dalton (Commissioner)
  - 1878: Mr. A. C. Mangles (Commissioner)
  - 1878- 1882: Mr. J. F. K. Hewitt
  - 1882: Mr. John Edgar
  - 1882-1885: Mr. J. F. K. Hewitt
  - 1879: Babu Rakhal Dass (special Commissioner)
  - 1888: F. W. R. Cowley (Judicial Commissioner)
  - 1885-1889: Mr. Charles Cecil Stevens (Commissioner)
  - 1896: Mr. Grimley (Commissioner)
- Historical era: Modern Period
  - Creation of the division: 1854
  - Bifurcation: 1912
Preceded by	Succeeded by
South-West Frontier Agency	Bihar and Orissa Province
- Today part of: Bihar; Jharkhand; Odisha; Chhattisgarh; West Bengal

The Chota Nagpur Division was one of the administrative divisions established under British rule. Under Act XX of 1854, the South West Frontier Agency was renamed a Commissionary, with the Political Agent becoming the Commissioner and the Assistant Political Agent designated as the Deputy Commissioner. As a result, the head of the Agency became the Commissioner of Chota Nagpur Division, shaping its colonial administration.

== History ==
=== Background ===
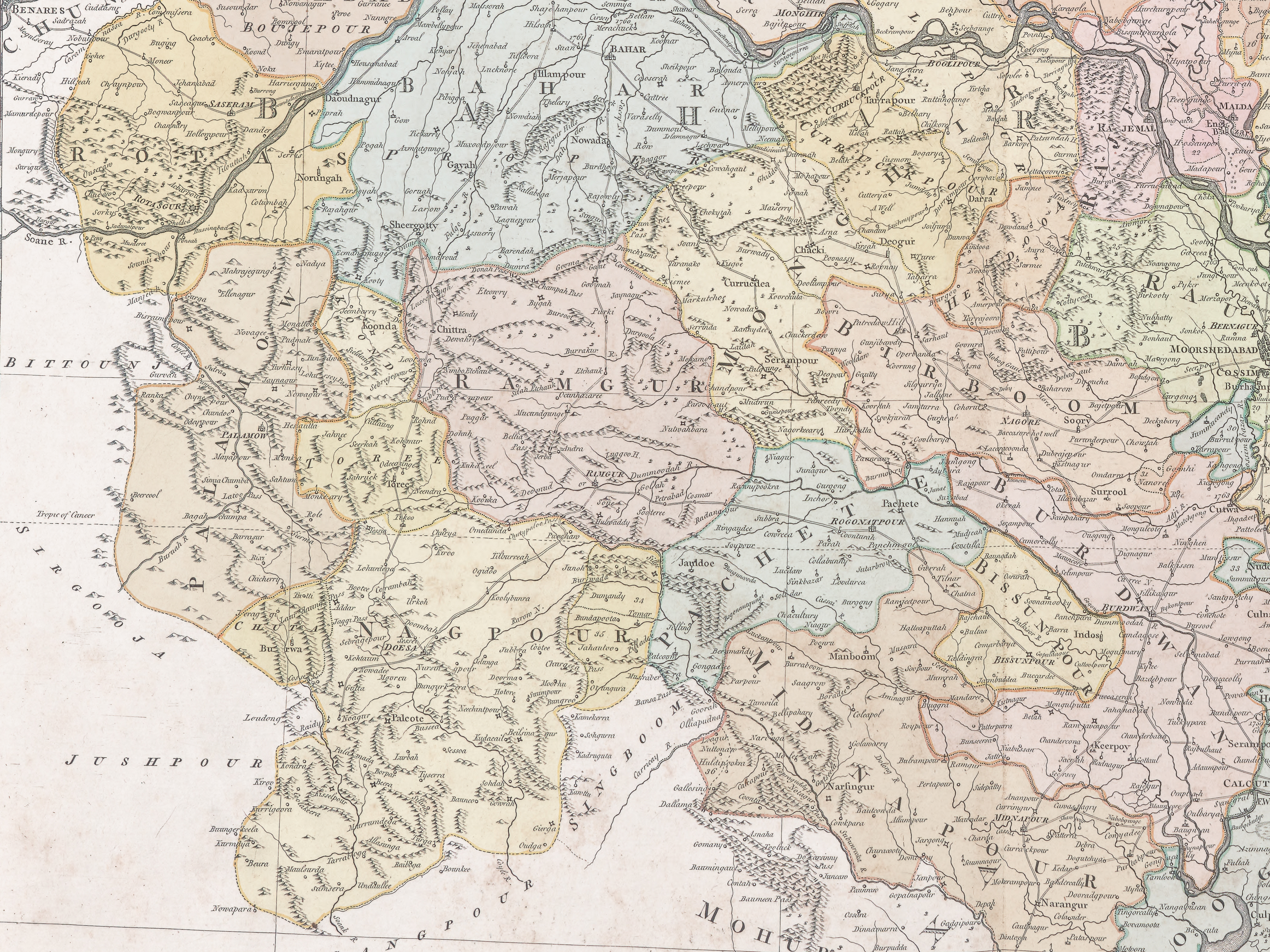
Chota Nagpur region in the 1770s, map by James Rennell.

Chota Nagpur division was a hilly and forested area. Part of Nagpur State in Maratha Empire. The region came under the control of the British in the 18th and 19th centuries, and was annexed to the Bengal Presidency, the largest province of British India. After the Kol rebellion of 1831-2, the division was exempted by Regulation XIII of 1833 from the general laws and regulations governing Bengal, and every branch of the administration was vested in an officer appointed by the supreme Government and called the Agent to the Governor-General of India for the South-West Frontier.

=== The Period of Commissionership (1854-1912) ===
In 1854, under Act XX of 1854, the districts of the Agency were reorganized into a Non-Regulation Division under the authority of a Commissioner.

During this period, the South-West Frontier Agency was designated as the Commissioner, and the Principal Assistant Agents became Principal Assistant Commissioners. Other Assistant Agents were re-designated as Senior Assistant Commissioners. The 31 rules, approved by the Government in Notification No. 615 of June 6, 1837, remained in effect as the governing laws for the division until they were gradually replaced by new legislative enactments.

This reorganization also granted the Deputy Commissioner full executive and judicial powers, significantly enhancing the role’s authority. The region was formally restructured as the Chota Nagpur Division, with Ranchi as its headquarters and Hazaribagh, Chaibasa, and Purulia serving as subordinate district centers. These administrative changes played a pivotal role in shaping the governance of the region under British rule.

=== Judicial Administration of Singhbhum ===
Until March 8, 1910, Singhbhum was under the jurisdiction of the Sessions Judge of Bankura, who was appointed as Additional Sessions Judge for Chota Nagpur in 1904. He presided over Sessions Cases and Criminal Appeals from Singhbhum and Manbhum, with trials conducted at Purulia and appeals heard at Purulia or Bankura for faster resolution. The local Criminal Courts consisted of a Deputy Magistrate and four Honorary Magistrates, with three based in Chaibasa and one in Chakardharpur. Additionally, a Subordinate Judge oversaw both Singhbhum and Manbhum, while a Munsif handled cases for Purulia. The Deputy Commissioner also served as a Subordinate Judge.

In 1910, the Manbhum-Sambalpur Judgeship was established, comprising Sambalpur, Singhbhum, and Manbhum. Under this new judicial system, cases from Singhbhum and Manbhum were heard at Purulia, while those from Sambalpur were handled at Sambalpur. This reorganization streamlined the judicial process, improving legal administration in the region.

=== Reorganization and judicial reforms ===
Chota Nagpur Division became part of the new province of Bihar and Orissa when it was created in 1912 to 1936. In 1936, the province was divided into two separate entities: Bihar and Orissa. Following this division, Sambalpur district was incorporated into Orissa, while Manbhum district remained in Bihar. As a result, a new judicial division, the Manbhum-Singhbhum Judgeship, was established to oversee legal matters in the region, with court sittings held at Purulia for cases from Manbhum and Singhbhum, ensuring efficient judicial administration.

== Administration ==
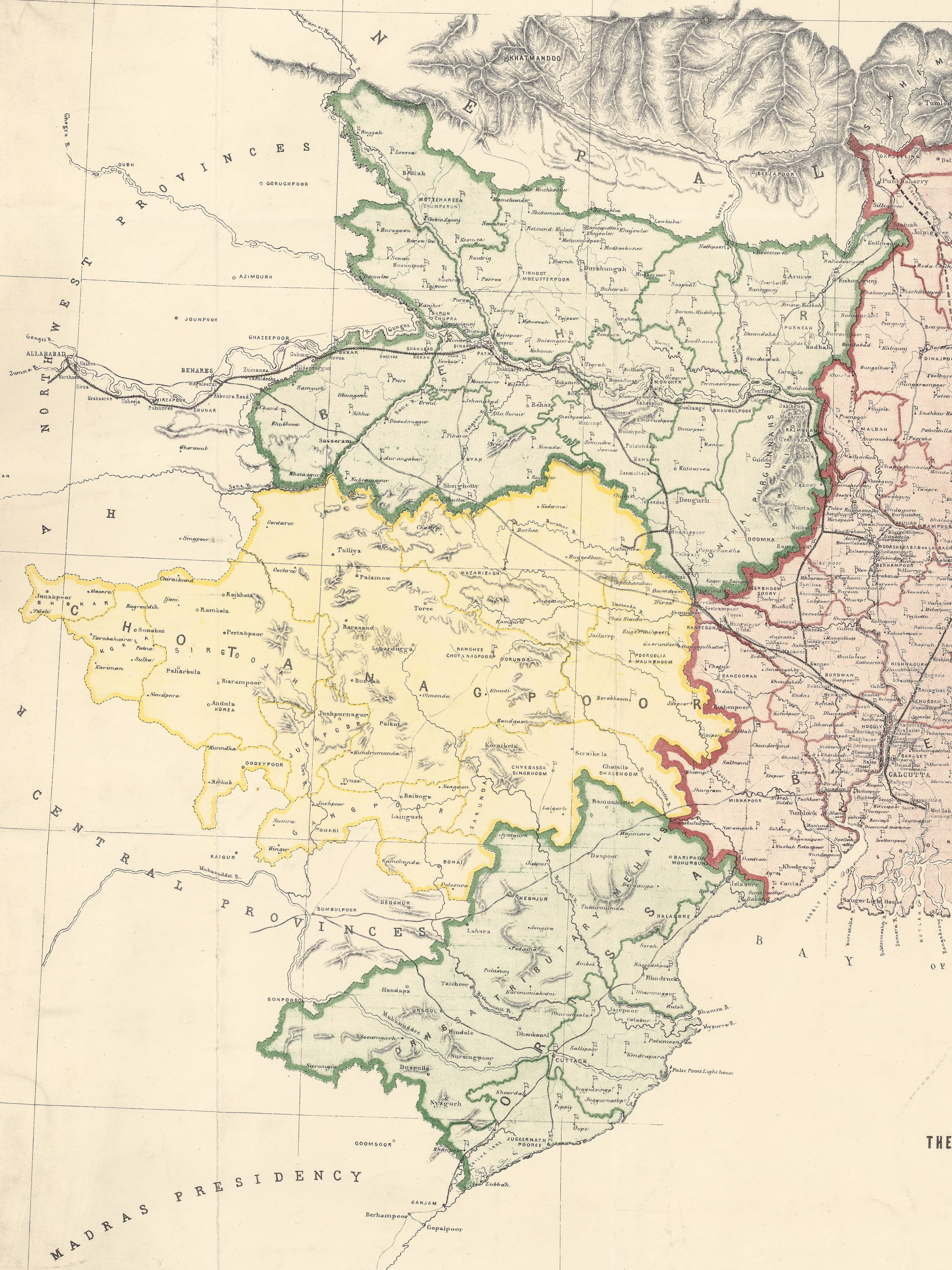
Chota Nagpur Division of the Bengal Presidency, 1872

The administrative headquarters of the division was at Ranchi. The total area of the division was 27,101 square miles (70,190 km^{2}), and the population was 4,900,429 in 1901. In 1901 Hindus constituted 68.5% of the total population, animists 22.7%, Muslims 5.7%, Christians 2.9%, and 853 Jains. The Chota Nagpur States, a group of princely states, was under the political authority of the division's commissioner.

District of Chota Nagpur Division
District	Area (1872) (sq miles)	District	Area (1901) (sq miles)
Hazaribagh	7,021	Hazaribagh	7,029
Lohardaga	12,044	Ranchi	7,128
Lohardaga	12,044	Palamu	4,914
Manbhum	4,914	Manbhum	4,147
Singbhum	4,503	Singbhum	3,753

== Gallery ==
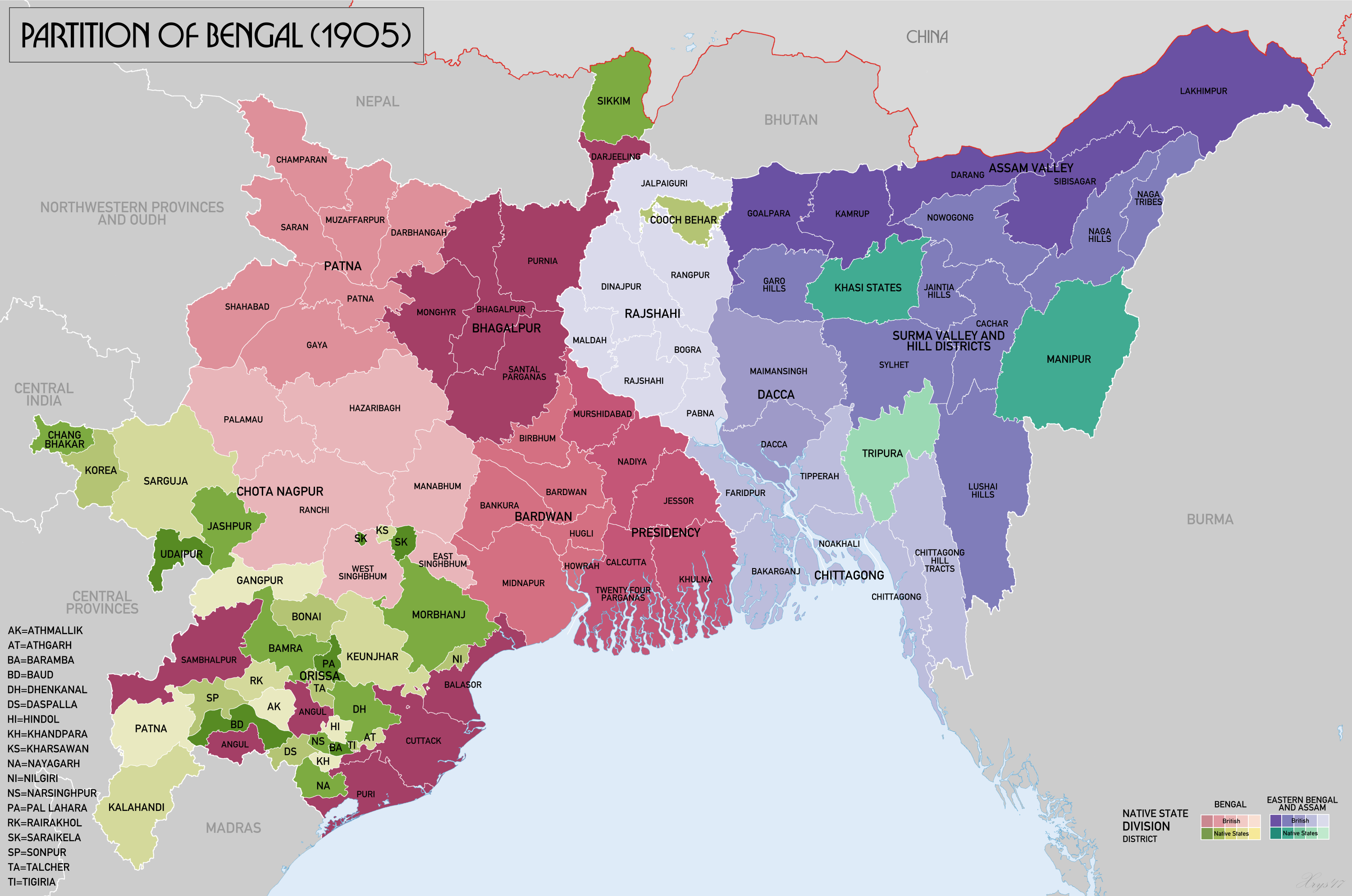
Chota Nagpur area in 1905

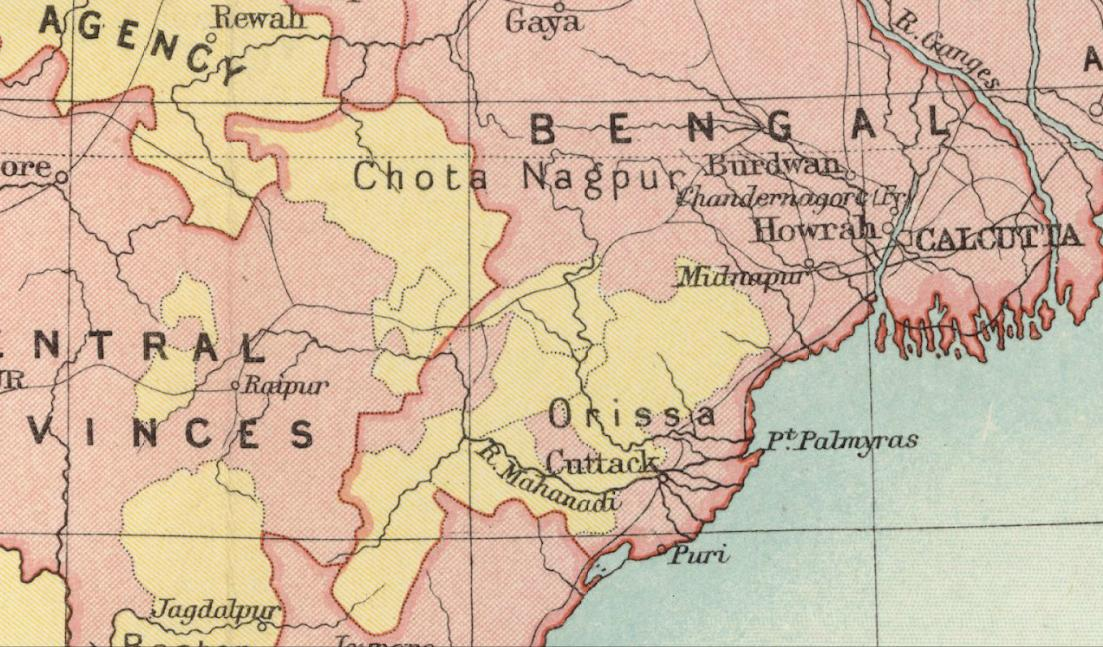
Chota Nagpur Plateau area. Political Divisions. 1909 Imperial Gazetteer of India map section.

== See also ==
- Chota Nagpur Tributary States
