= Rani Shiromani =

Indian Revolutionary and Queen of Karnagarh

- Born: 1728
- Died: 1812 (aged 83–84); Midnapore, British India
- Known for: Chuar Rebellion
- Title: Queen of Karnagarh
- Spouse: Raja Ajit Singh

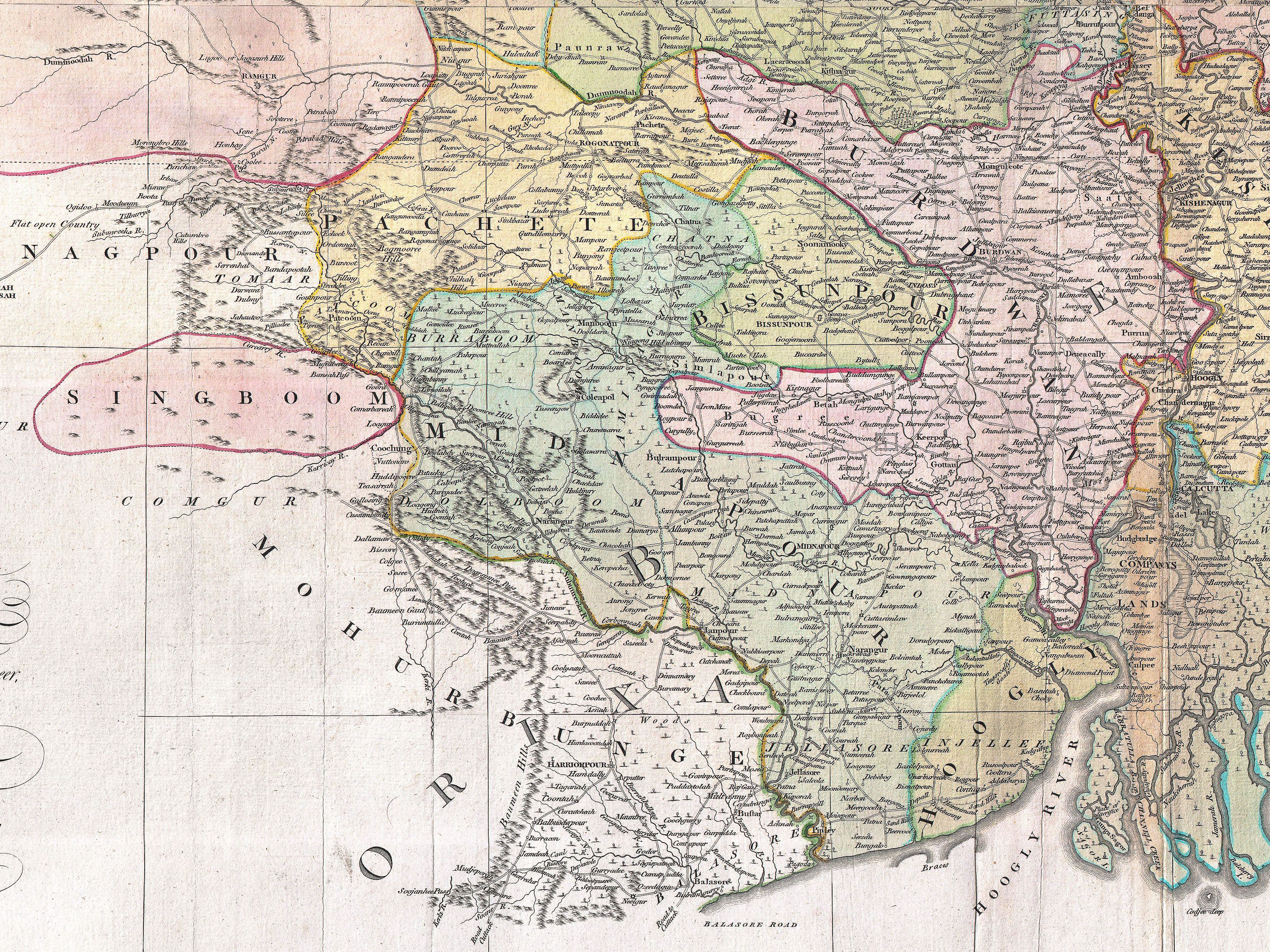
Estate of Bengal (map by Runnel, 1776)

Rani Shiromani (1728 A.D – 1812 A.D) was the queen of Midnapore Raj in Bengal. She had played a major role in the Chuar Rebellion in Midnapore.

== Biography ==
Rani Shiromani was queen of Raja Ajit Singh of Midnapore Raj. According to Binoy Ghosh, the Rajas of Karnagarh (also known as Midnapore Raj) ruled over a zamindari that included Midnapore and the surrounding areas.

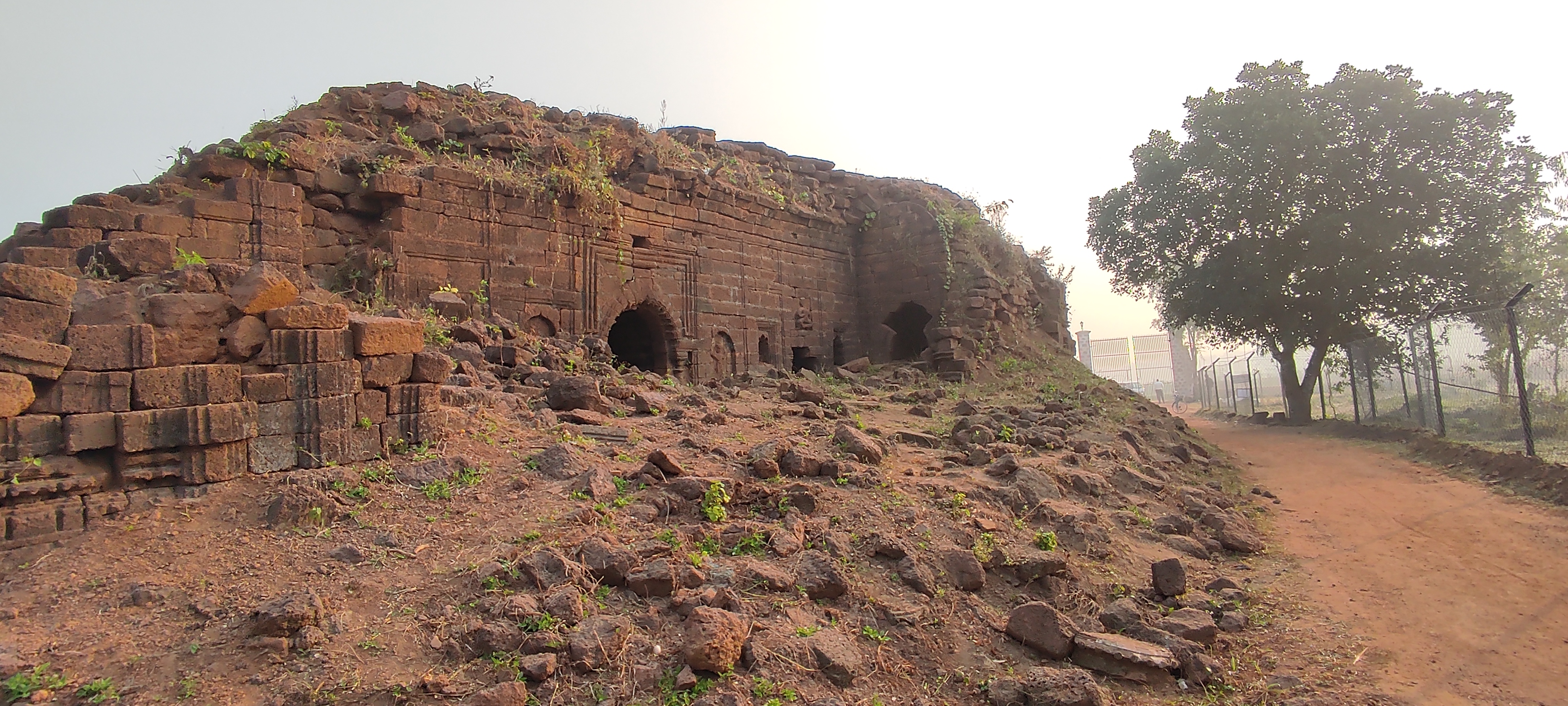
Ruins of fort of Rani Shiromani at Karnagarh in Paschim Medinipur district

=== Agreement with the Raja of Narajole ===
According to an official account by the Collector of Midnapore, Raja Ajit Singh of Karnagarh, died without issue in 1753 CE. Following his death, his two widows, Rani Bhawani and Rani Shiromani, jointly succeeded to the Midnapore Raj. During this period, the region was facing unrest due to the Chuar Rebellion, a tribal uprising against the British East India Company. The leader of the Chuars, Gobardhan Sardar, took advantage of the political instability and advanced against the queens with a strong force. To avoid dishonour and likely capture, both Ranis fled from Karnagarh and sought refuge with their relative, Trilochan Khan of Narajole. Gobardhan subsequently occupied Midnapore without encountering resistance. In 1756, an agreement was reached between the Ranis and Trilochan Khan. As per the terms, Trilochan was entrusted with the responsibility of subduing the Chuars, restoring Midnapore to the Ranis, and administering the estate as Naib (deputy) during their lifetimes. He was also expected to maintain their dignity. In return, it was agreed that after the demise of both queens, Trilochan Khan and his heirs would inherit the Midnapore Raj. This arrangement appears to have been honored, as historical records indicate that the Rajas of Narajole served as Naibs of Midnapore from 1768 to 1800. A judgment passed by the Sadar Amin of Midnapore in 1841 (Suit No. 771, dated 18 September 1841) confirmed that Trilochan Khan successfully defeated the Chuar forces and restored the estate to the queens. Rani Bhawani had died in 1760, after which Mati Ram Khan, Trilochan’s nephew and successor, became the Naib of Rani Shiromani. Upon Mati Ram’s death, his son Sita Ram Khan assumed the position and was succeeded by his eldest son Anandalal Khan, who served as the guardian of the Rani. In 1800, Rani Shiromani transferred ownership of the Midnapore Raj to Anandalal Khan through a Rebanomah (deed of gift), citing her inability to pay the government revenue. Anandalal Khan subsequently applied for settlement of the estate, and the revenue authority accepted his claim. He entered into a Kabuliyat (agreement) with the government, agreeing to pay an annual revenue of ₹90,214-6-11.

However, according to the British administrator Bayley, Rani Shiromani had earlier refused to pay the revenue fixed under the Decennial Settlement, leading the government to manage the estate directly (khas) between 1787 and 1800. Eventually, Anandalal Khan, acting as her agent, presented the deed of gift and entered into a revenue agreement with the Collector for ₹85,000.

After the deaths of both Rani Shiromani and Anandalal Khan, a legal dispute arose over succession. The Privy Council ultimately ruled in favor of Anandalal Khan’s successor, thereby transferring final ownership of Midnapore Raj to the Raja of Narajole.

=== Role in Chuar rebellion ===
Chuar rebellion was a series of peasant movements between 1766 and 1834 by the tribal inhabitants of the countryside surrounding the Jungle Mahals settlements of Dhalbhum, Midnapore, Bishnupur and Manbhum against the rule of the East India Company (EIC).

In the beginning of the year 1799, the Chuar Rebellion (also known as second Chuar or Paik Rebellion) was centered around Midnapore, Bahadurpur, Salbani, and Karnagarh. The rebels began launching guerrilla attacks and assembled at the residence of Rani Shiromani in Karnagarh, who actively led them. According to a letter written by the then British Collector, the rebellion intensified, and by February 1799, the rebels had occupied a wide stretch of villages around Midnapore. In March, Rani Shiromani led around 300 rebels in an attack and looted all the weapons of the Company’s soldiers at the Garh (local fort) of Karnagarh. These attacks and lootings continued until December 1799.

However, after the British forces occupied Awasgarh and Karnagarh, Rani Shiromani, who was suspected of being one of the rebel leaders, was arrested and taken to Midnapore as a prisoner. She was held in solitary confinement at Hijli Detention Camp, which is now known as Shaheed Bhawan located within the campus of IIT Kharagpur in Paschim Medinipur district, West Bengal.

=== Death ===
She was imprisoned for about 12 years at Awasgarh fort in Midnapore until her death in 1812. She was the India's first lady prisoner for leading the Chuar Rebellion as early as the 1790s.

== Honours ==
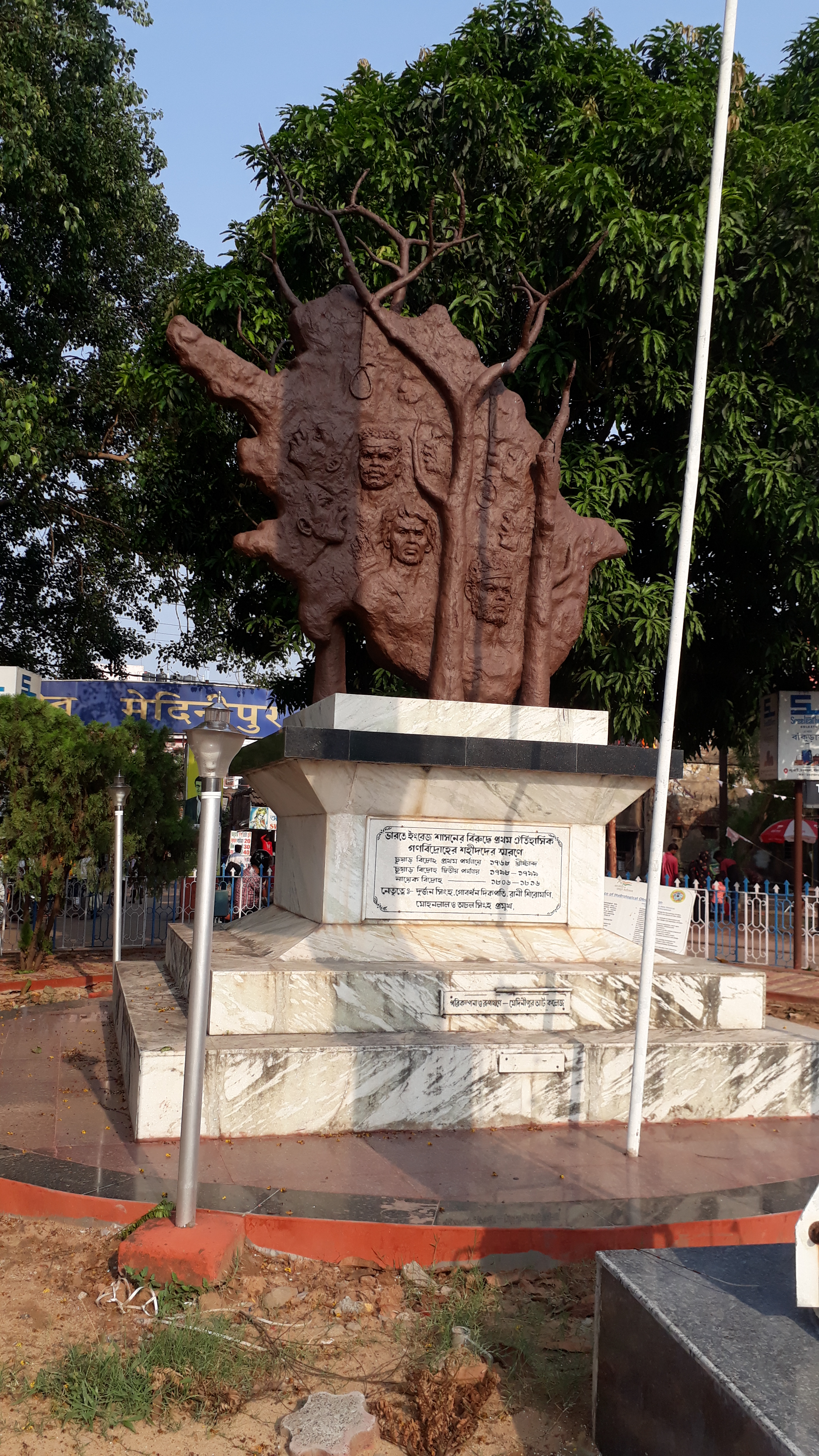
Memorial of Chuar rebellion at Midnapore

The Indian Railways has introduced the Howrah-Adra Shiromani fast passenger train to commemorate the title of the Rani Shiromani.

== See also ==
- Midnapore Raj
- Chuar rebellion
