= Narayangarh Raj =

- 1264 A.D–1949 A.D
- Capital: Narayangarh
- Common languages: Bengali, Bhumij, Santali
- Government: Monarchy (1264–1857); Zamindari Estate (1857–1947)
- Raja
  - 1264: Gandharva Pal (first)
  - 1844-1933: Prithviballabh Pal (last)
- History
  - Established: 1264 A.D
  - Acceded to India: 1949 A.D
- Currency: Indian Rupee
Succeeded by
Dominion of India
- Today part of: West Bengal, Republic of India

The Narayangarh Raj (also known as Narayangarh Kingdom) was a medieval semi - independent kingdom and later a large zamindari estate of Sadgop during British Raj in the erstwhile Midnapore district of West Bengal. The area of 126.96 square miles was under the Raja of Narayangarh, which included 387 villages.

Mr. Bayley states that the family of the Raja of Narayangarh counts back for twenty - four generations, and bears the titles of 'Sri Chandan' and 'Mari Sultan'.

== History ==
Narayangarh Raj of Midnapore was founded in 1264 by Gondobah Pal, also knowns as Gandharva Pal. It is said that Gandharva Pal was born in Dignagar in Ausgram, which is close to Amragarh.

The Narayangarh Raja helped the Mughal prince Khurram (later Emperor Shah Jahan) when he revolted against his father.

Major Chapman, who was entrusted with the task of repelling the Marathas also known as Bargis from Midnapore, wrote a letter on 19th January, 1764 to Raja Parikshit Pal, ruler of Narayangarh of Midnapore, requesting him to supply the English army, encamping near Danton on the bank of Subarnarekha, with necessary provisions during the campaign.

== See also ==
- Narayangarh, Paschim Medinipur
- Midnapore Raj
- Narajole Raj
