= Narajole =

- Village
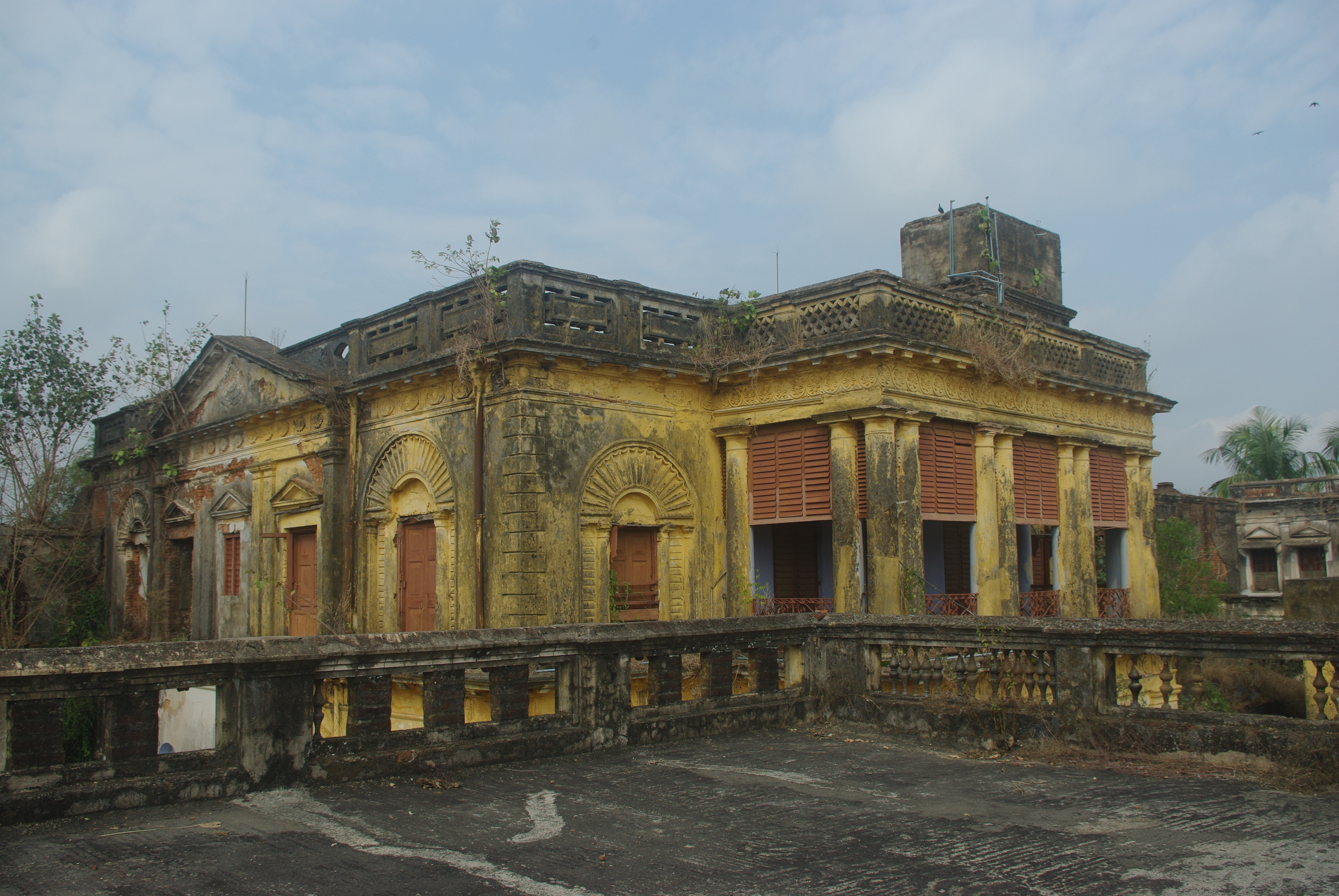
- Narajole Rajbari

- Location in West Bengal, India Narajole (India)
- Coordinates: 22°34′01.2″N 87°36′54.0″E
- Country: India
- State: West Bengal
- District: Paschim Medinipur

Population (2011)
  - Total: 4,085

Languages
  - Official: Bengali, English
- Time zone: UTC+5:30 (IST)
- Telephone/STD code: 03225
- Lok Sabha constituency: Arambagh
- Vidhan Sabha constituency: Chandrakona
- Website: paschimmedinipur.gov.in

Narajole (also referred to as Nij Narajol) is a village and gram panchayat in Daspur I CD Block in Ghatal subdivision of Paschim Medinipur district in the state of West Bengal, India.

== History ==
According to Binoy Ghosh, Narajole's ruling clan, belonging to the Sadgop (Bengali Yadav) community, was founded by Uday Narayan Ghosh. His great grandson, Raja Kartickram, was honoured with the title ‘Roy’ by the Mughal emperor. Thereafter, they used that title.

Raja Ajit Singh, the last king of the Midnapore zamindari, with its headquarters at Karnagarh, died childless in 1749. They were close to the rulers of Narajole. His two queens, who inherited the Midnapore zamindari, ran into great difficulties during the Chuar Rebellion and sought the support of Raja Trilochan Khan of Narajole. After Raja Trilochan Khan's death, the responsibility of looking after the Midnapore zamindari and Rani Shiromani of Karnagarh (the other queen had died by then) fell successively on Raja Motiram and Raja Sitaram. Rani Shiromani loved Sitaram's eldest son, Anandalal, as her own son and handed over the entire Midnapore zamindari to him in 1800. Unfortunately, Anandalal died childless and as per his wishes his brothers became the owners – Nandalal Khan of Narajole Zamindari and Mohanlal Khan of Midnapore Zamindari.

== Geography ==
Cities and towns in Ghatal subdivision of Paschim Medinipur district
M: municipal city/ town, R: rural/ urban centre, H: historical/ religious centre
Owing to space constraints in the small map, the actual locations in a larger map may vary slightly

=== Area overview ===
Ishwar Chandra Vidyasagar, scholar, social reformer and a key figure of the Bengal Renaissance, was born at Birsingha on 26 September 1820.

Ghatal subdivision, shown in the map alongside, has alluvial soils. Around 85% of the total cultivated area is cropped more than once. It has a density of population of 1,099 per km^{2}, but being a small subdivision only a little over a fifth of the people in the district reside in this subdivision. 14.33% of the population lives in urban areas and 86.67% lives in the rural areas.

Note: The map alongside presents some of the notable locations in the subdivision. All places marked in the map are linked in the larger full screen map.

=== Gram panchayats ===
Villages in Nij Narajole gram panchayat are: Bachhra Kundu, Bali Pata, Balluri, Bara Mara, Chandipur, Danikola, Dubrajpur, Gobra Kundu, Haja Kundu, Harirajpur, Kalyanpur, Kanta Darja, Kismat Narajole, Nij Narajole, Rai Kundu, Ramdaspur, Simana, Singaghai and Supapursuri.

== The palace ==
Narajole's Rajbari, Garh Narajole, of the Narajole Raj, was spread over 500 bighas and divided in to the inner and outer segments. The outer segment housed the poorer people, amongst whom were some painter families, who had survived the travails of life and in 1970 continued to produce dolls, painted pots and decorative wall plates. The inner segment was an ‘Indrapuri’ (the palace of heaven) consisting of splendid buildings (including the three-storeyed palace) temples, gardens etc. The large entrance gate lead to a spacious garden, with a temple of the family deity, Sitaramjiu. The drawing rooms were filled with selected country made and foreign showpieces and pictures of the royalty. On the way out, one again got to see a mix of gardens, ponds and residential quarters, with some Shiva temples nearby. There were many other temples. On the southern side were rangmahal, rasmancha and dolmancha.

The Hawa Mahal (ballroom) is located on a 60 bigha land, surrounded by a parikha. Lankagarh, about a kilometer from main Rajbari houses fifty four temples. A 10-bigha plot was donated for a degree college.

The former Rajas of Narajole had a patriotic mindset. Special mention may be made of Raja Narendralal khan and Raja Debendralal khan. Almost all national, leaders in the pre-independence era, had visited Narajole.

== Demographics ==
As per 2011 Census of India Nij Narajol had a total population of 4,085 of which 2,089 (51%) were males and 1,996 (49%) were females. Population below 6 years was 492. The total number of literates in Nij Narajol was 2,930 (71.73% of the population over 6 years).

== Transport ==
Keshpur-Daspur Road passes through Narajole. Another road which passes through village Dewanchak which connects the CK Road-Radhanagar-Ghatal road, is one of the busiest highways connecting capital Kolkata

== Education ==
Narajole Raj College was established in 1966 and is affiliated to Vidyasagar University. It offers undergraduate courses in science and arts. It has started a post-graduate course in Bengali. Amongst those who took a leading part in establishing the college were: Anjali roy, belonging to the family of the erstwhile rulers of the region, Rajani Kanta Dolai, a political activist involved in the freedom movement, and Radhayashyam Mondal, a social activist.

== Culture ==
David J. McCutchion mentions the following temples in Narajole:

- Shiva temple in the Rajbari, as a small at-chala, measuring 12’ 6” x 11’ 10”, 19th century built with terracotta on two sides.
- Jayadurga temple as a pancha-ratna with ridged rekha turrets. It is a plain laterite structure, measuring 22’ x 19’ 6’’, built in the 18th century.
- Rajbari Durgadalan as a large chandni or dalan type with terracotta and stucco.
- Dolmancha near the Rajbari, measuring 10’ 5” square with rich terracotta on two sides.
- Rasmancha of the Rajbari as a plain square panchabimsati-ratna (with 25 towers)), built in the 19th century.

== Narajole picture gallery ==
Narajole Rajbari with 250 rooms

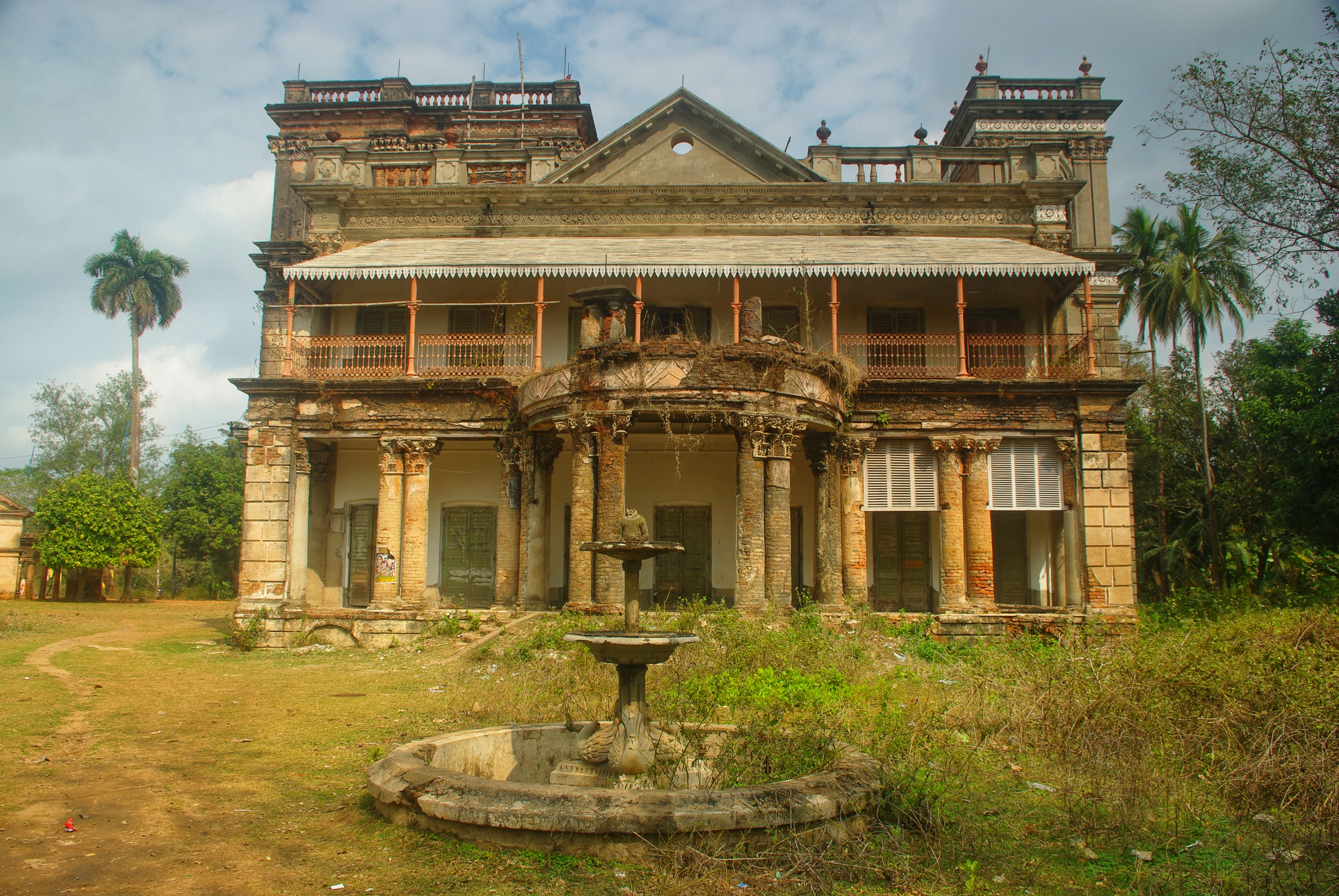
Hawa Mahal

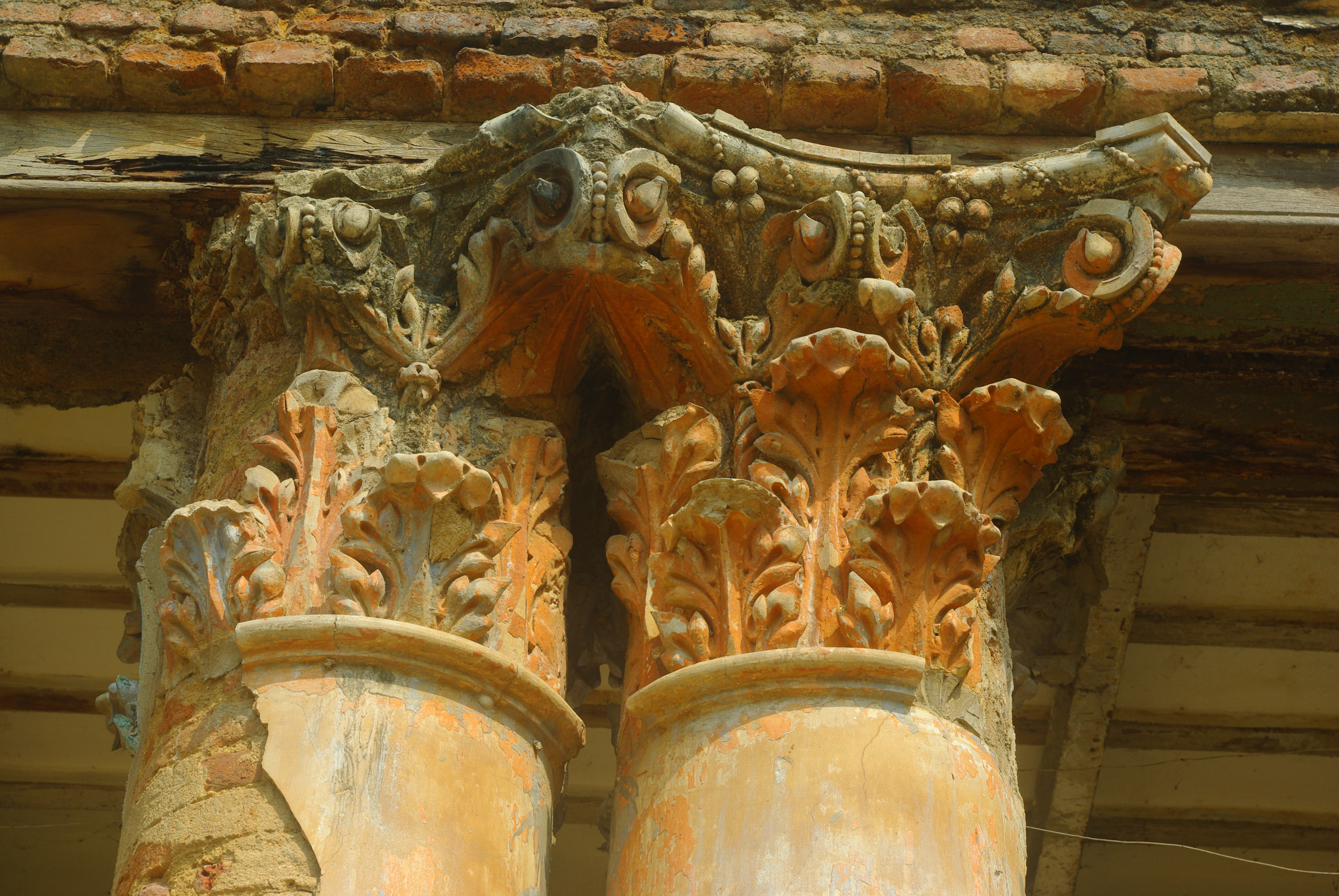
Hawa Mahal

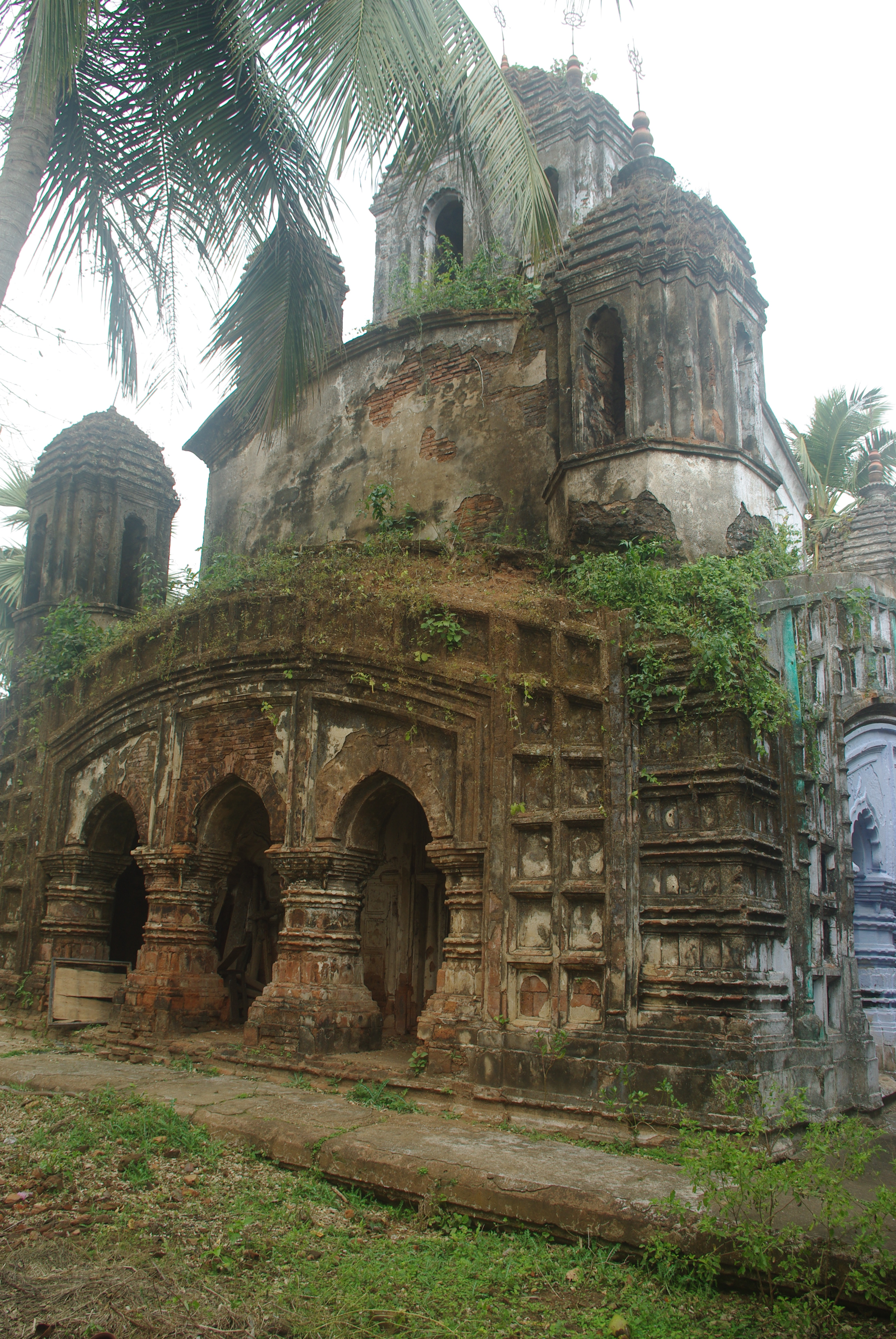
Govinda Jiu temple inside Narajole Rajbari

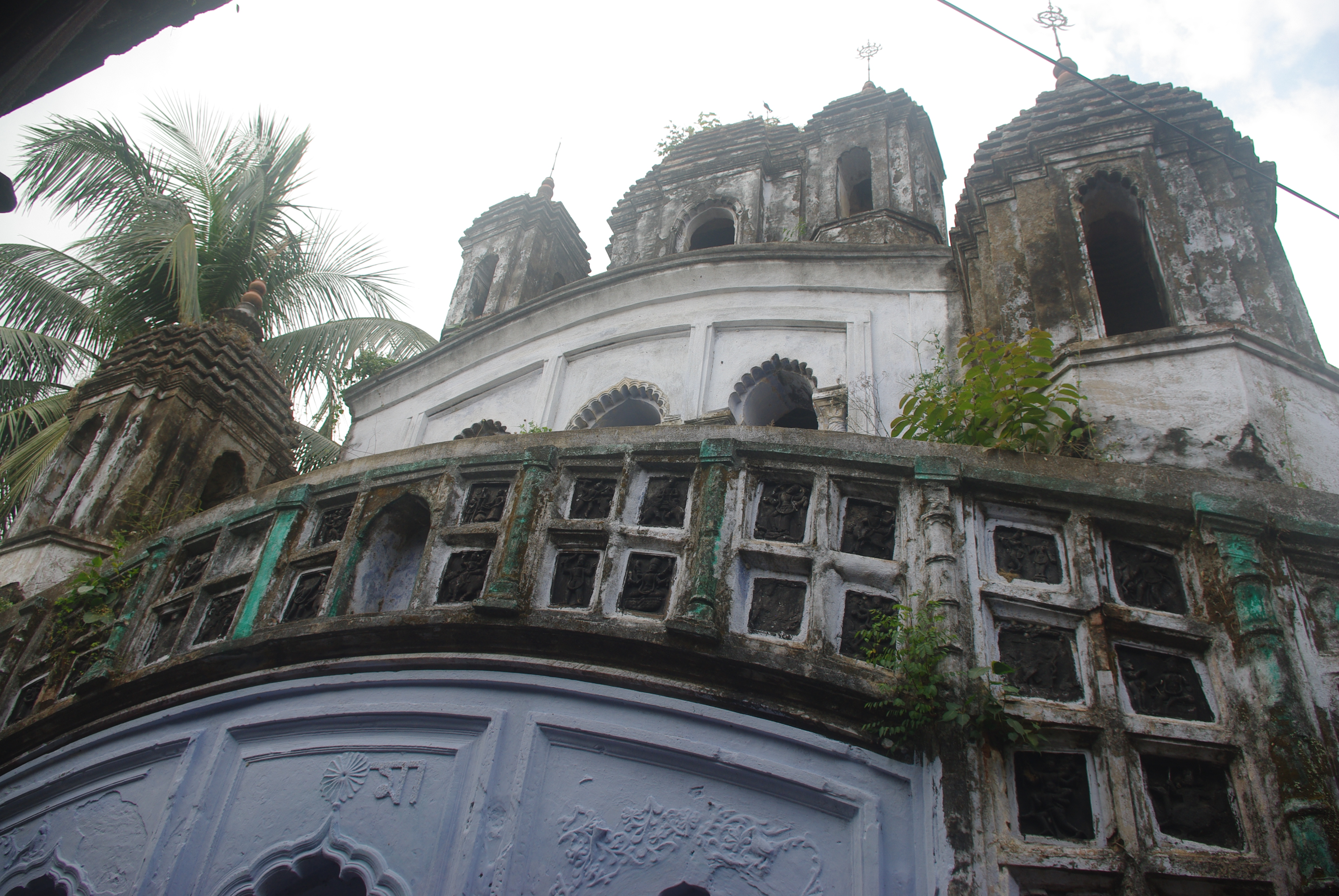
Govinda Jiu temple

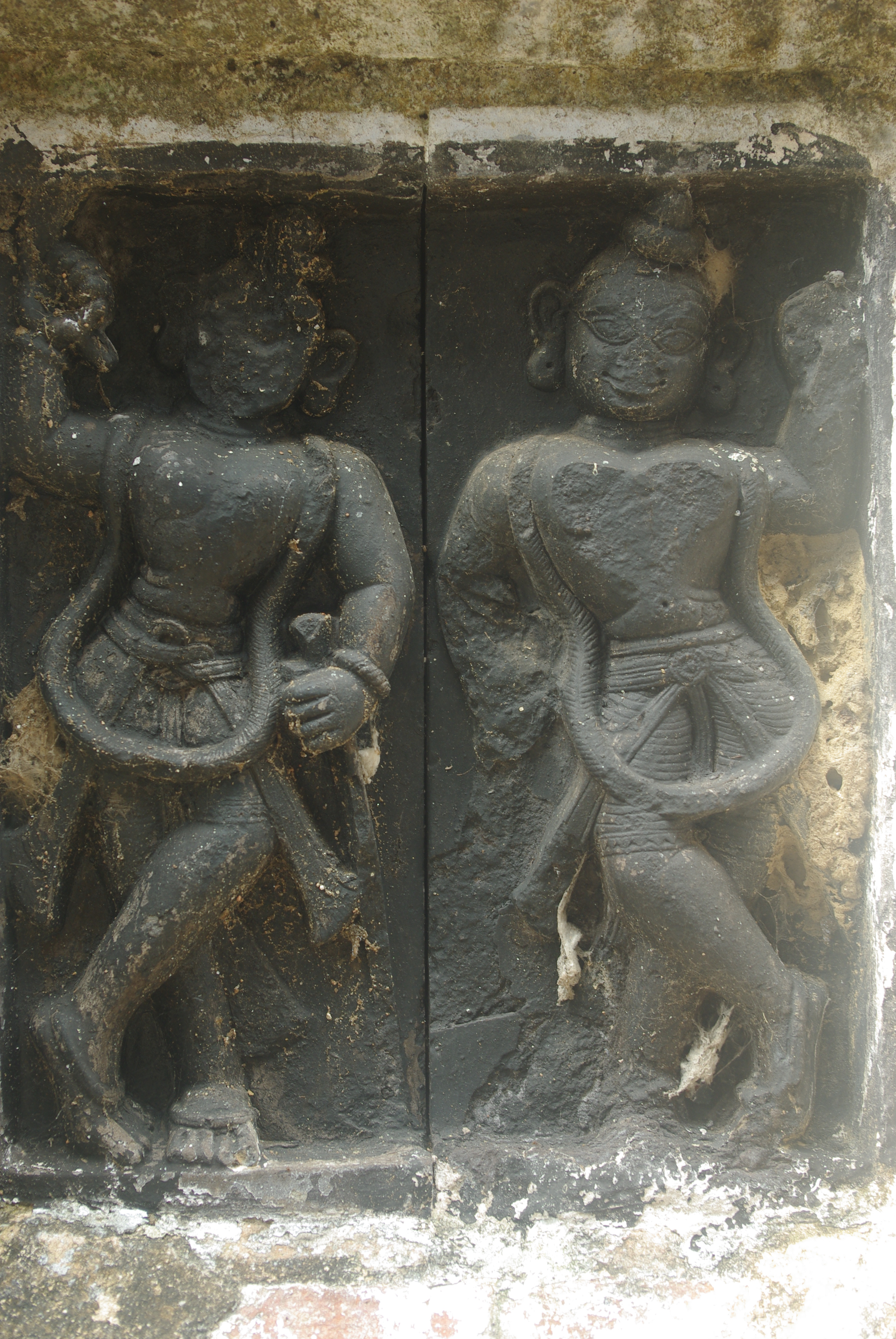
Basalt stone sculpture in Gobinda Jiu temple

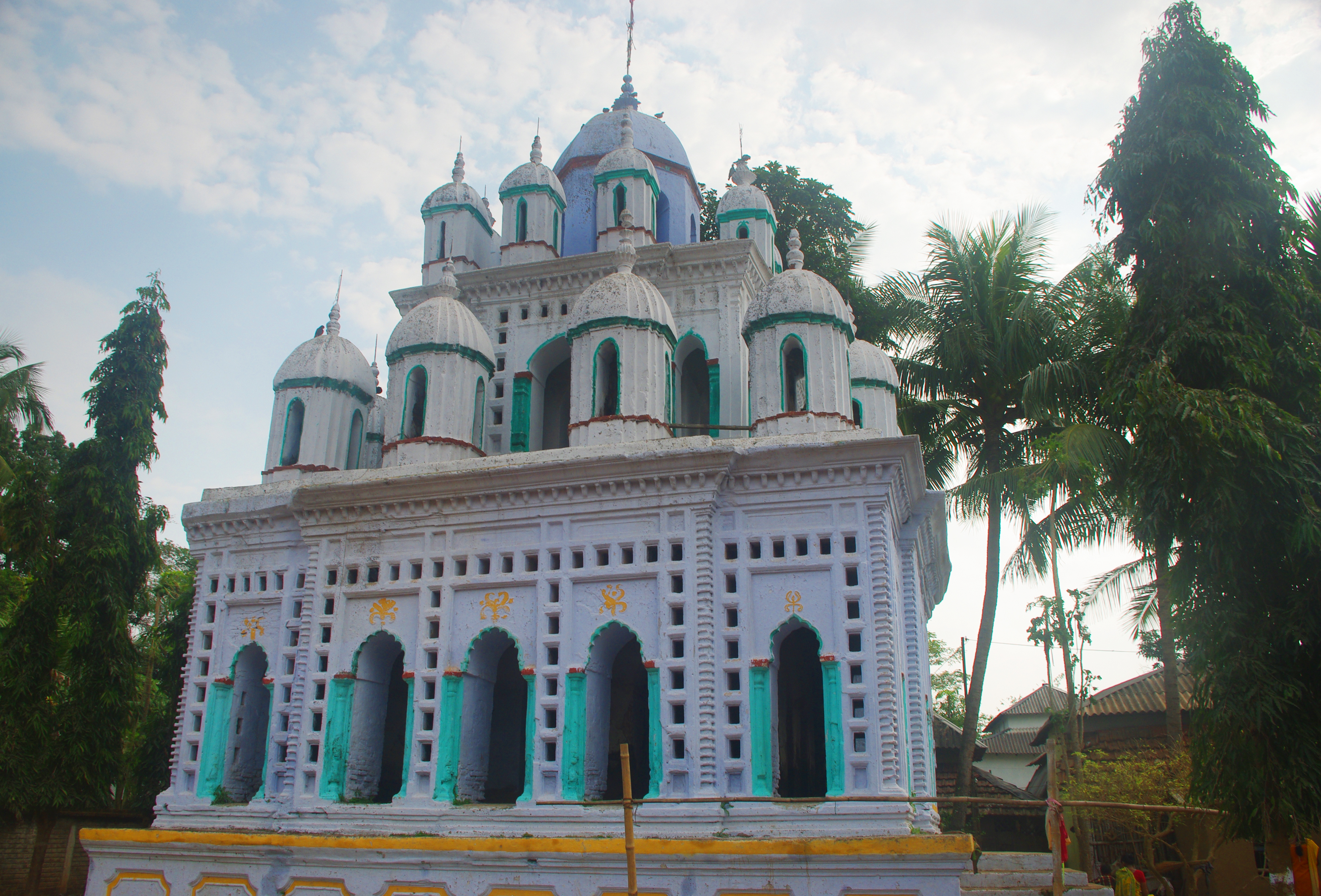
Rasmancha with 25 pinnacles

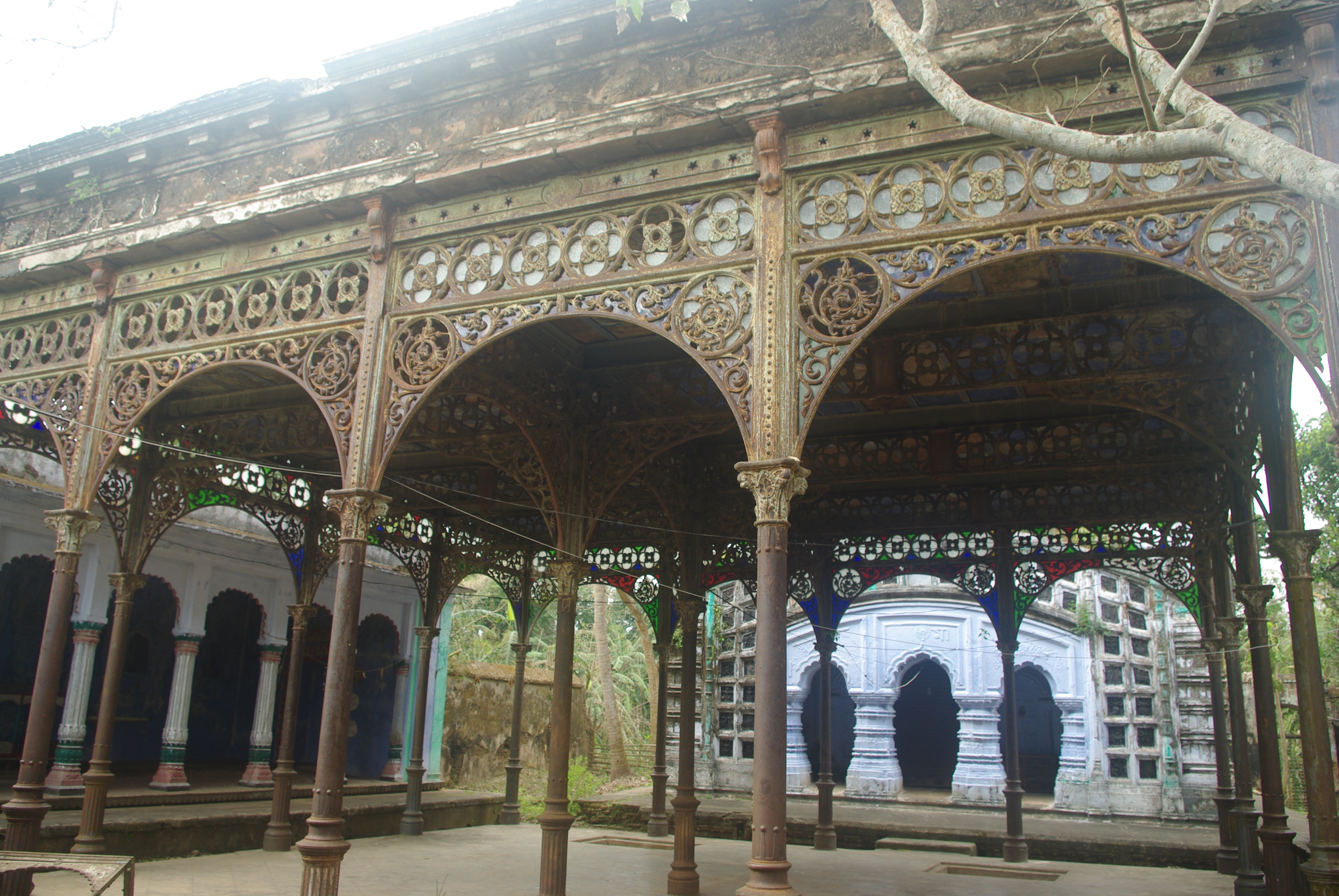
Durga Dalan inside Narajole Rajbari

== See also ==
- Narajole Raj
- Narajole Raj College
