= Karnagarh Raj =

Medieval dynasty and later a zamindari estate

Karnagarh Raj or the Midnapore Raj was a medieval dynasty and later a zamindari estate during the British period in the Paschim Medinipur district in the state of West Bengal, India. The semi-independent zamindar of Karnagarh were amongst the most powerful rulers of Jungle Mahal region.

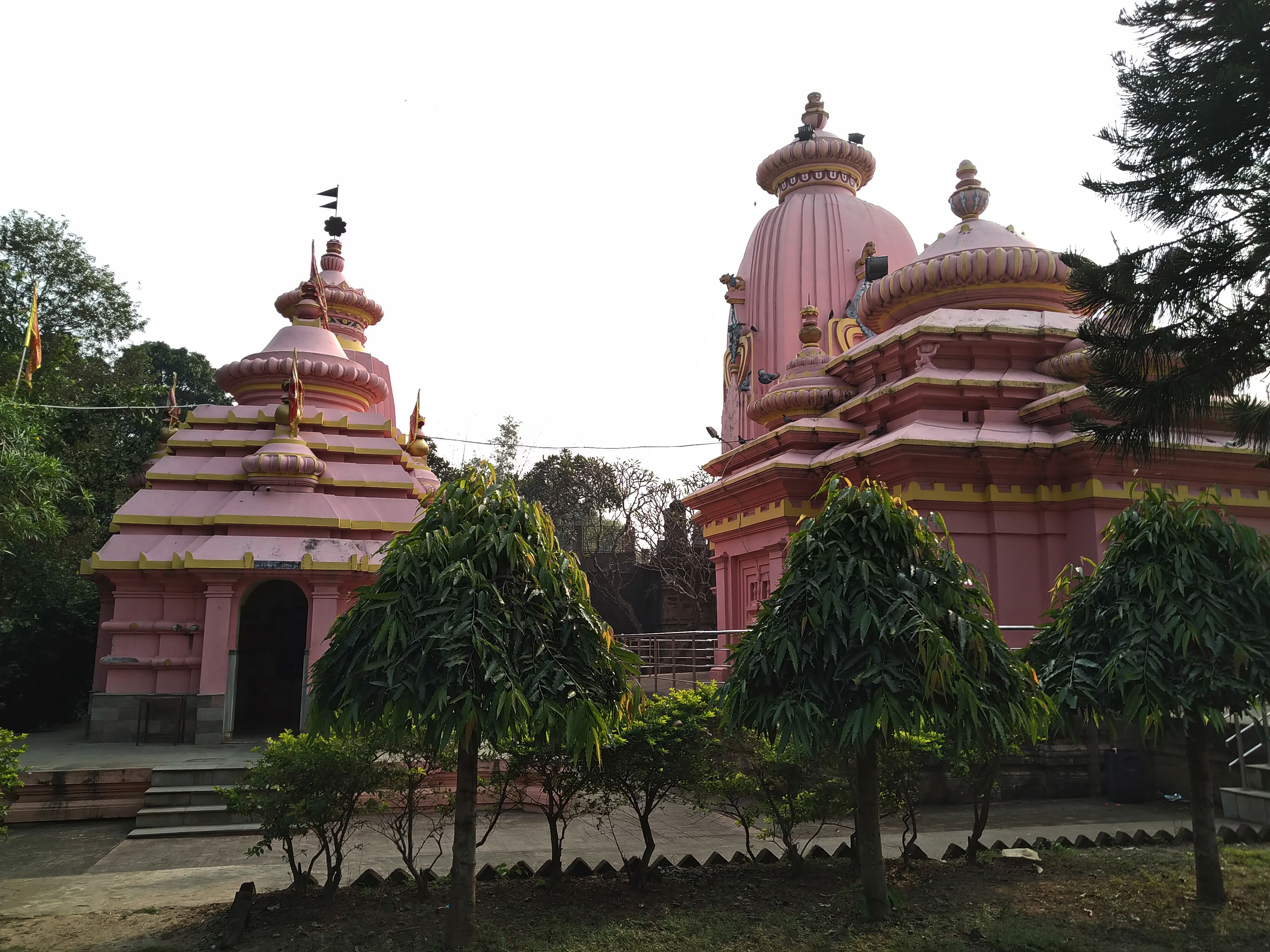
Dandesvara and Mahamaya Temple

The kings of Karnagarh ruled over a zamindari that included Midnapore and the surrounding areas. They had a close friendship with the zamindar of Narajole Raj.

== History ==
Karnagarh or Midnapore Raj was established by Raja Lakshman Singh in 1568. According to Binoy Ghosh, the kings of Karnagarh ruled over a zamindari that included Midnapore and the surrounding areas. The Sadgop dynasty that ruled over Karnagarh included Raja Lakshman Singh (1568–1589), Raja Shyam Singh (1589–1607), Raja Chhotu Roy (1607–1667), Raja Raghunath Roy (1671–1693), Raja Ram Singh (1693–1711), Raja Jaswant Singh (1711–1749), Raja Ajit Singh (1749) and Rani Shiromani (1756–1812).

In 1589 AD With the help of Laxman Singh's brother Shyam Singh, Isha Khan of Lohani Dynasty of Odisa killed Laxman Singh of Karnagarh and captured Karnagarh and put Shyam Singh on the throne as a puppet. It didn't last though.They were soon defeated by an alliance of Bhurshut , Mallabhum and the Mughals Laxman Singh's grandson Raja Chhotu Roy was enthroned as the next ruler.

During the reign of Raja Jasomanta Singh, the revenue of Karnagarh was 40,126 taka 12 annas and his army numbered 15,000. Jasomanta Singh was considered as one of Strong allies of Nawab. Famous Bengali poet Rameswar Bhattacharya wrote Sivayan Kavya in Karnagarh Rajsava.

The Rajas of Mallabhum were an independent kingdom free from the rights of the Nawabs. In 1747, the army of King Gopal Singh Malla of Mallabhum attacked Karnagarh. It is heard with the blessings of Mahamaya Jasomanta Singh defeated Mallabhum's forces.

The kings of Karnagarh had a close link with the Sadgop rulers of Narajole Raj. The last king of Karnagarh, Raja Ajit Singh died childless. His property went into the hands of his two queens, Rani Bhabani and Rani Shiromani. During the Chuar rebellion, the leader of the Chuars, Gobardhan Dikpati, occupied the palace. Both the queens met the king of Narajole, Raja Trilochan Khan, who provided them shelter and promised to recover their property. Rani Bhabani died in 1161 Bangabda (1754 AD) and Rani Shiromani handed over the entire property to Anandalal of the Narajole family even before she died in 1219 Bangabda (1812 AD). However, the East India Company were suspicious that Rani Shiromani had links with those involved in the Chuar rebellion, and as a result they considerably restricted the amount of sovereignty she held in response.

There, however, are other sources that say that the Chuar rebellion took place as a series of insurrections by people who lived off the jungles and a sort of primitive agriculture in the old Manbhum, Bankura and Midnapore districts between 1771 and 1809, generally under dispossessed zamindars that included Rani Shiromani of Karnagarh

== List of rulers ==
- Raja Lakshman Singh (1568–1661)
- Raja Shyam Singh (1661–1668)
- Raja Chhotu Roy (1668–1671)
- Raja Raghunath Roy (1671–1693)
- Raja Ram Singh (1693–1711)
- Raja Jaswant Singh (1711–1749)
- Raja Ajit Singh (1749–1753)
- Rani Bhawani (1753–1760)
- Rani Shiromani (1760–1800)

== Karnagarh fort ==
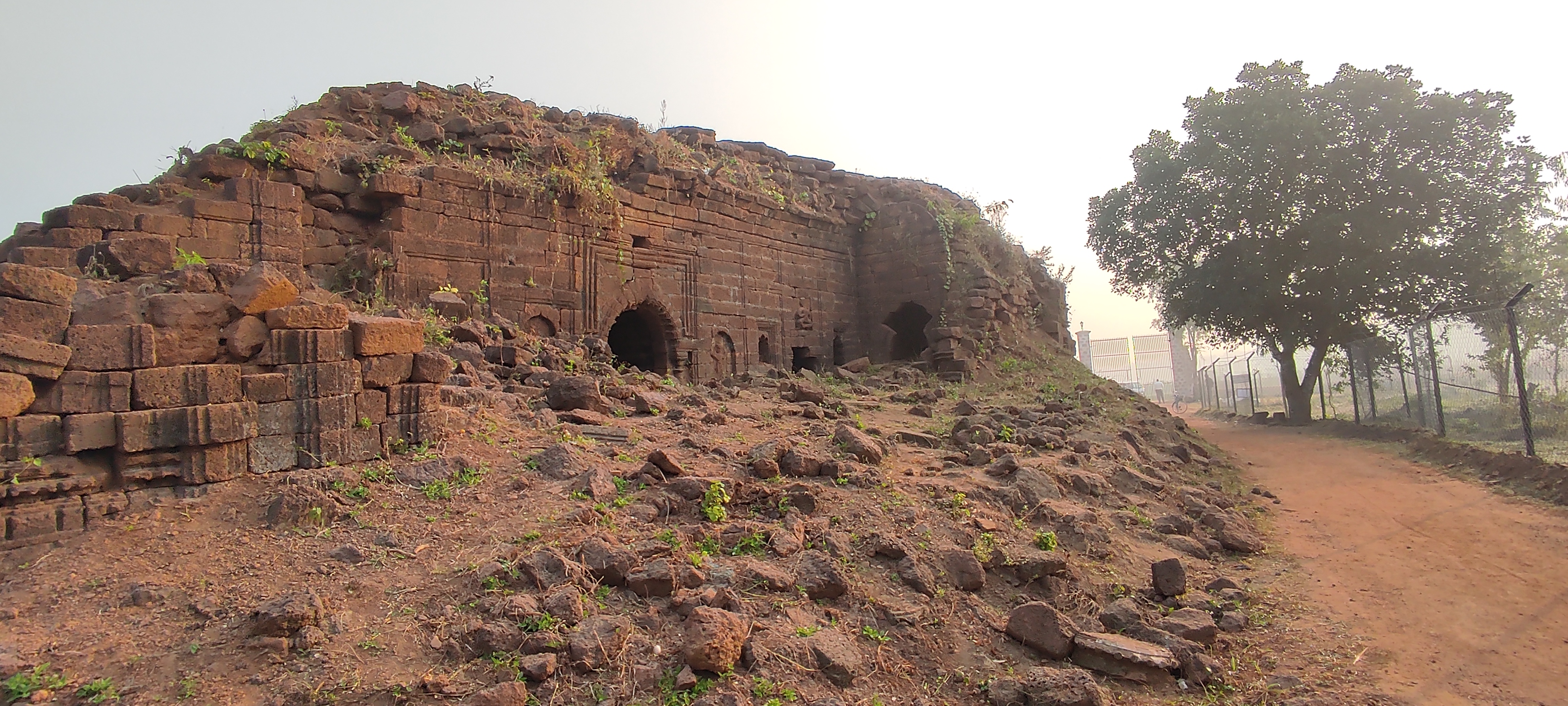
Ruins of fort of Rani Shiromani at Karnagarh in Paschim Medinipur district

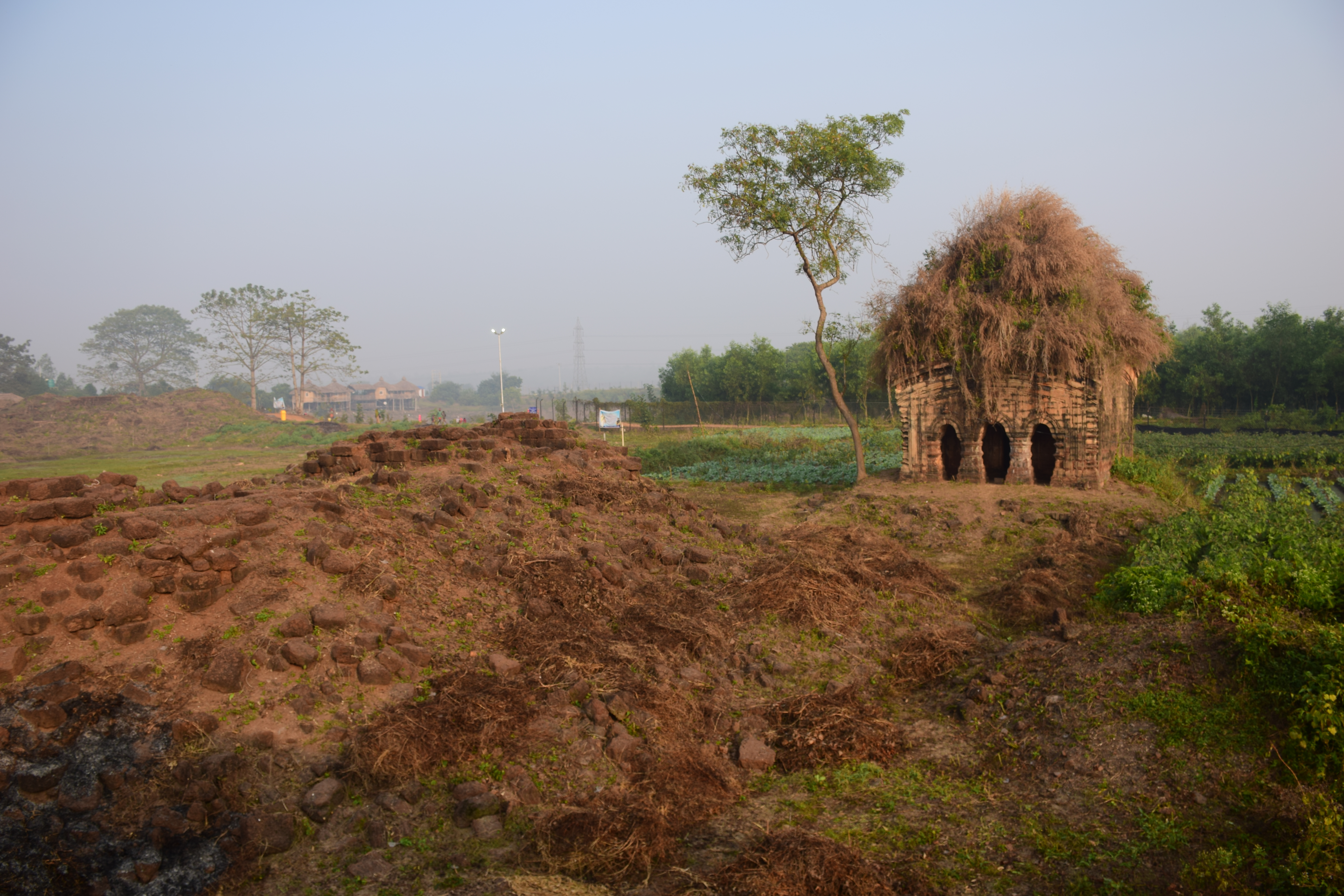

Karnagarh fort consisted of about 100 bighas of land, stretching for about 4 miles, that was surrounded by the Parang River. It was about 4 miles north of Midnapore. The inside of the fort was divided into two parts, the andar mahal for the royal family and the sadar mahal for others. The temples of Dandesvara and Mahamaya, the ruling deities of Karnagarh, were located to the south of the fort. Now, hardly anything, other than memory, remains.

The Midnapore Raj family had two other forts nearby at Awasgarh and Jamdargarh.

== See also ==
- Karnagarh
- Narajole Raj
- Narayangarh Raj
