= Karnagarh =

- Village
- Location in West Bengal, India Karnagarh (India)
- Coordinates: 22.5147°N 87.3536°E
- Country: India
- State: West Bengal
- District: Paschim Medinipur

Population (2011)
  - Total: 2,812

Languages*
  - Official: Bengali, Santali, English
- Time zone: UTC+5:30 (IST)
- PIN: 721129
- Telephone/STD code: 03222
- Lok Sabha constituency: Medinipur
- Vidhan Sabha constituency: Medinipur
- Website: paschimmedinipur.gov.in

Karnagarh (also written as Karnagar) is a village and a gram panchayat in the Salboni CD block in the Medinipur Sadar subdivision of the Paschim Medinipur district in the state of West Bengal, India.

== History ==
According to Binoy Ghosh, the kings of Karnagarh ruled over a zamindari that included Midnapore and the surrounding areas. The Sadgop dynasty that ruled over Karnagarh included Raja Lakshman Singh (1568-1661), Raja Shyam Singh (1661-1668), Raja Chhotu Roy (1667), Raja Raghunath Roy (1671-1693), Raja Ram Singh (1693-1711), Raja Jaswant Singh (1711-1749), Raja Ajit Singh (1749) and Rani Shiromani (1756-1812).

The kings of Karnagarh had a close link with the Sadgop rulers of Narajole Raj. The last king of Karnagarh, Raja Ajit Singh died childless. His property went into the hands of his two queens, Rani Bhabani and Rani Shiromani. During the Chuar Rebellion, the leader of the Chuars, Gobardhan Dikpati, occupied the palace. Both the queens met the king of Narajole, Raja Trilochan Khan, who provided them shelter and promised to recover their property. Rani Bhabani died in 1161 Bangabda (1754 AD) and Rani Shiromani handed over the entire property to Anandalal of the Narajole family even before she died in 1219 Bangabda (1812 AD). However, the East India Company were suspicious that Rani Shiromani had links with those involved in the Chuar rebellion, and as a result they considerably restricted the amount of sovereignty she held in response.

There, however, are other sources that say that the Chuar rebellion took place as a series of insurrections by people who lived off the jungles and a sort of primitive agriculture in the old Manbhum, Bankura and Midnapore districts between 1771 and 1809, generally under dispossessed zamindars that included Rani Shiromani of Karnagarh.

== Geography ==
Cities and towns in Medinpur Sadar subdivision of Paschim Medinipur district
M: municipal city/ town, CT: census town, R: rural/ urban centre, H: historical/ religious centre, F: facilities
Owing to space constraints in the small map, the actual locations in a larger map may vary slightly

=== Location ===
Karnagarh is located at 22.5147°N 87.3536°E.

=== Area overview ===
Paschim Medinipur district (before separation of Jhargram) had a total forest area of 1,700 km^{2}, accounting for 14.31% of the total forested area of the state. It is obvious from the map of the Midnapore Sadar subdivision, placed alongside, is that there are large stretches of forests in the subdivision. The soil is predominantly lateritic. Around 30% of the population of the district resides in this subdivision. 13.95% of the population lives in urban areas and 86.05% lives in the rural areas.

Note: The map alongside presents some of the notable locations in the subdivision. All places marked in the map are linked in the larger full screen map.

== Demographics ==
According to the 2011 Census of India, Karnagar had a total population of 2,812, of which 1,392 (50%) were males and 1,420 (50%) were females. There were 387 persons in the age range of 0–6 years. The total number of literate persons in Karnagar was 1,257 (51.84% of the population over 6 years).

.*For language details see Salboni (community development block)#Language and religion

== Karnagarh fort ==
Karnagarh fort consisted of about 100 bighas of land, stretching for about 4 miles, that was surrounded by the Parang River. It was about 4 miles north of Midnapore. The inside of the fort was divided into two parts, the andar mahal for the royal family and the sadar mahal for others. The temples of Dandesvara and Mahamaya, the ruling deities of Karnagarh, were located to the south of the fort. Now, hardly anything, other than memory, remains. The Karnagarh family had two other forts nearby – at Abasgarh and Jamdargarh.

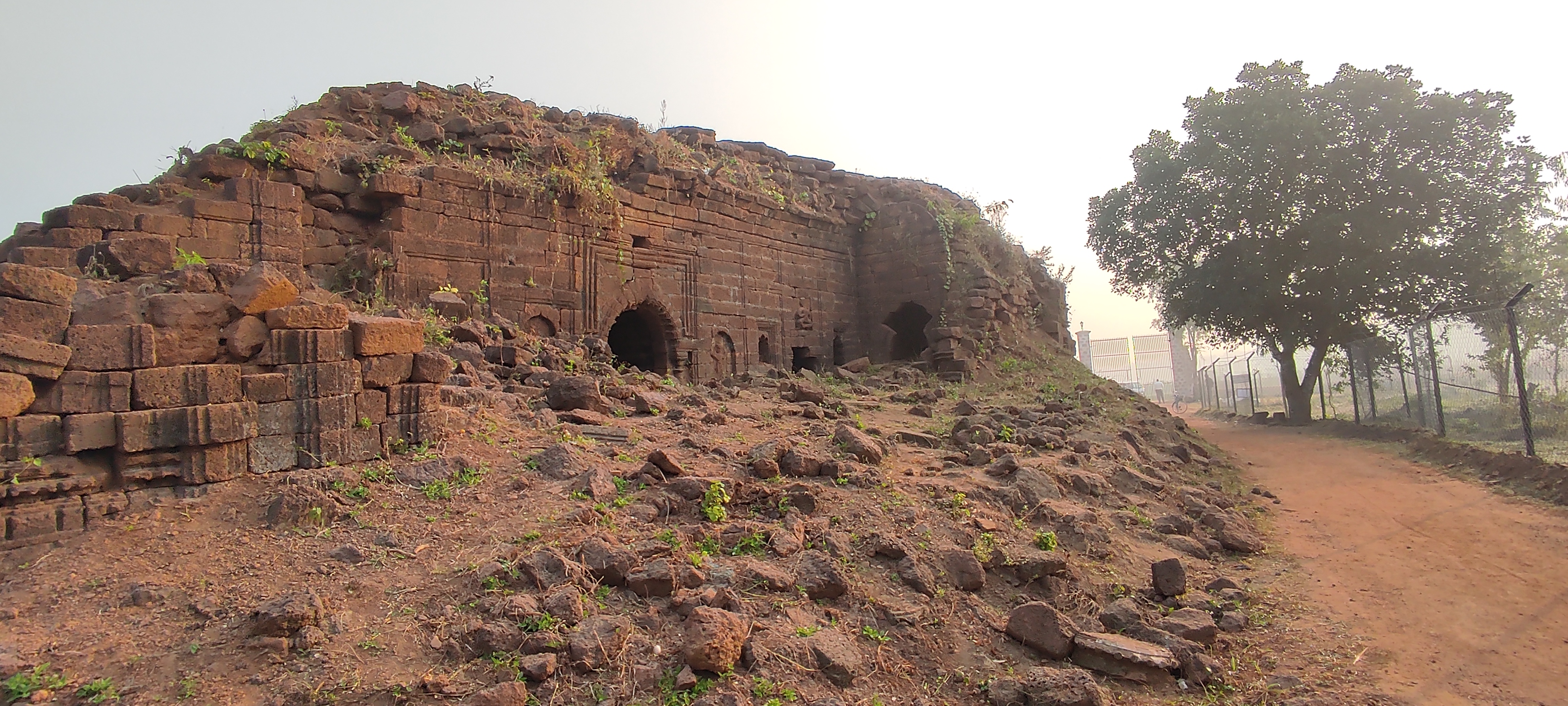
Ruins of fort of Rani Shiromani at Karnagarh

== Culture ==
David J. McCutchion mentions the Dandesvara temple as having a pirha larger than the main temple, measuring 13’ 6" square + 25’ square, built of laterite having stucco decoration.

The 60’ high Anadilinga Dandesvara and the Devi Bhagabati Mahamaya temples are the main attractions at Karnagarh. A big fair is held on the Poush Sankranti day (mid-January).

The temple of Mahamaya was built in the 18th century AD.

Both the Dandesvara and Mahamaya temples are state protected monuments.

== Karnagarh picture gallery ==
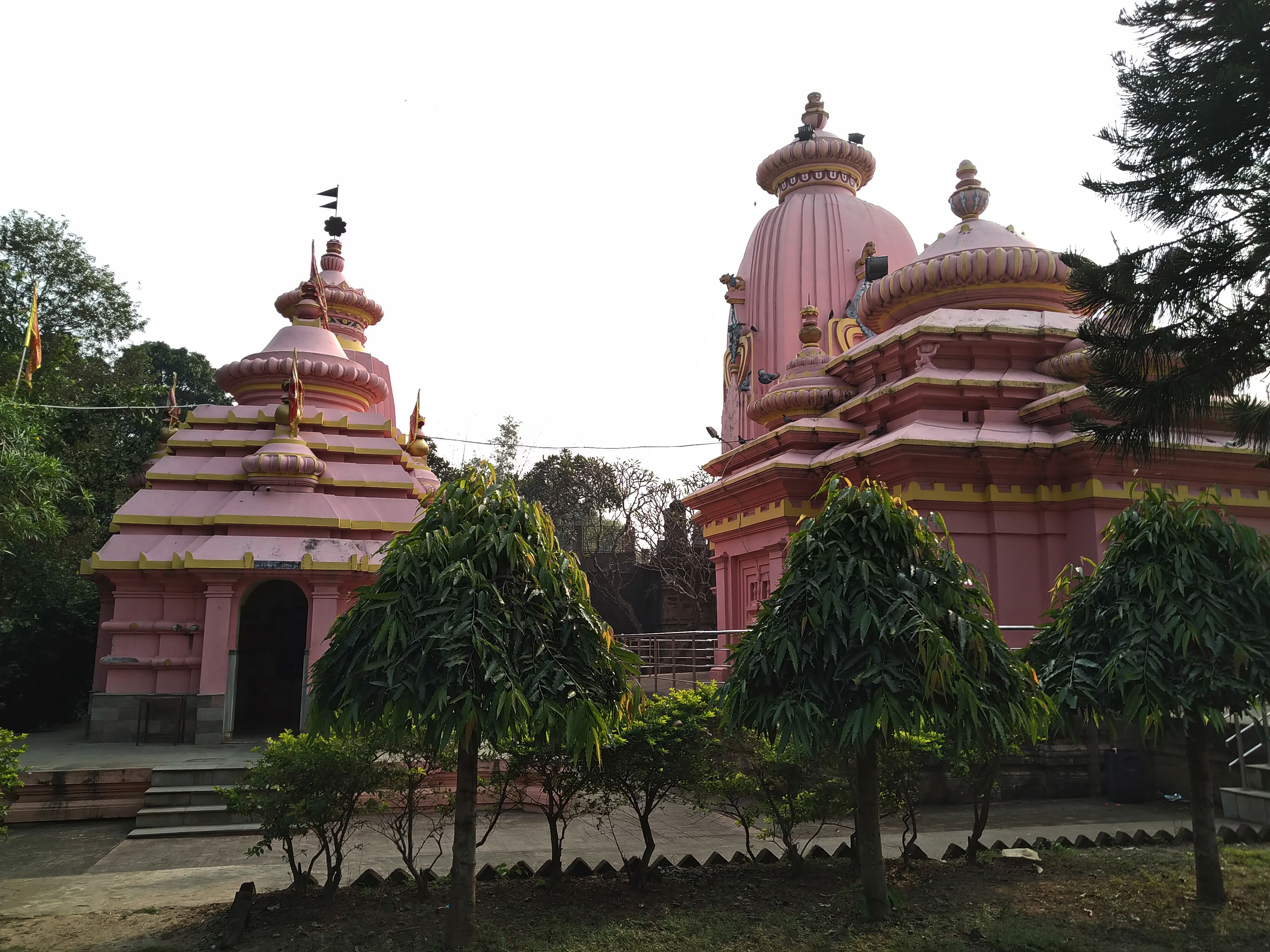
Dandesvara and Mahamaya temples

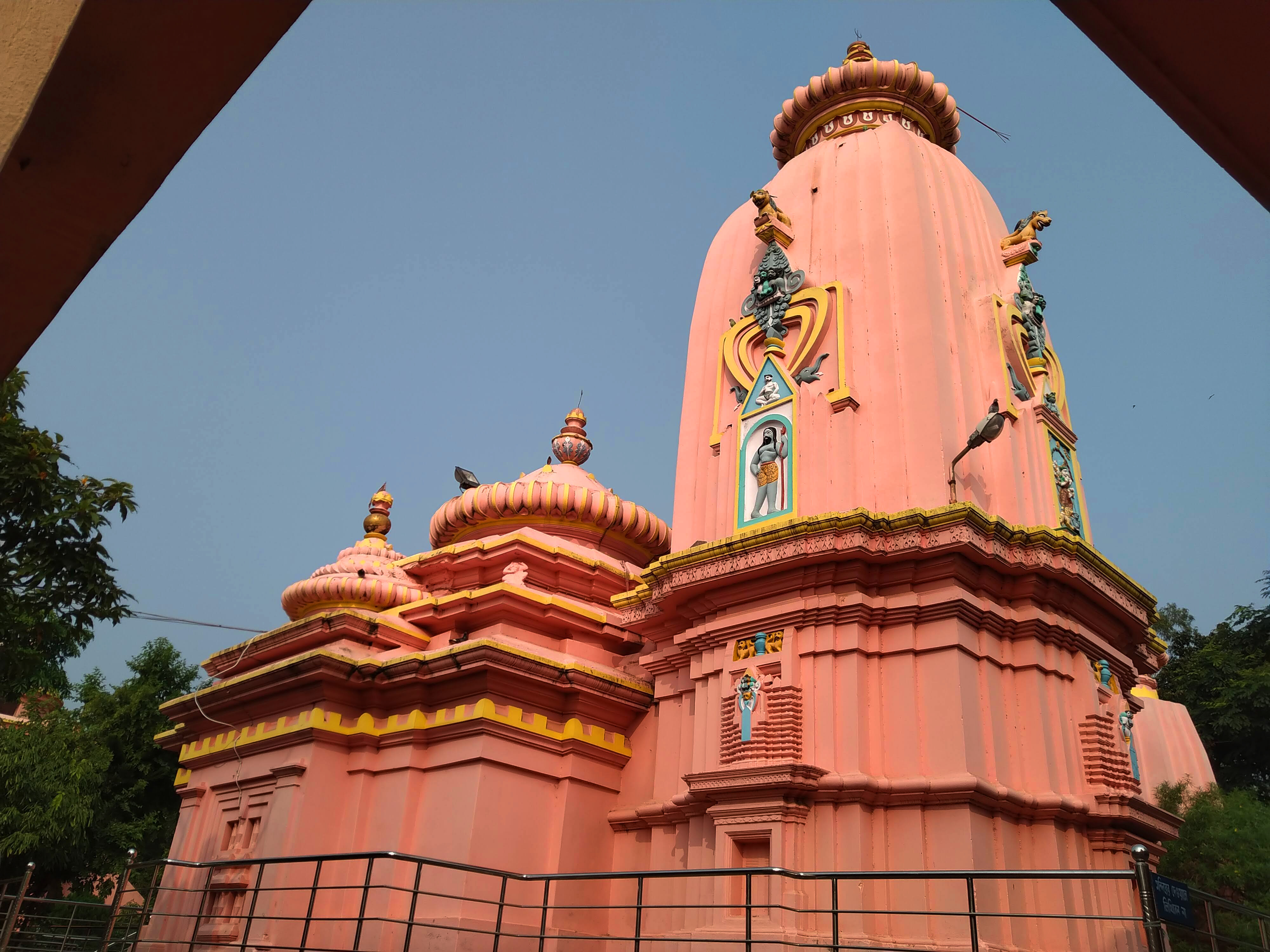
Dandesvara temple

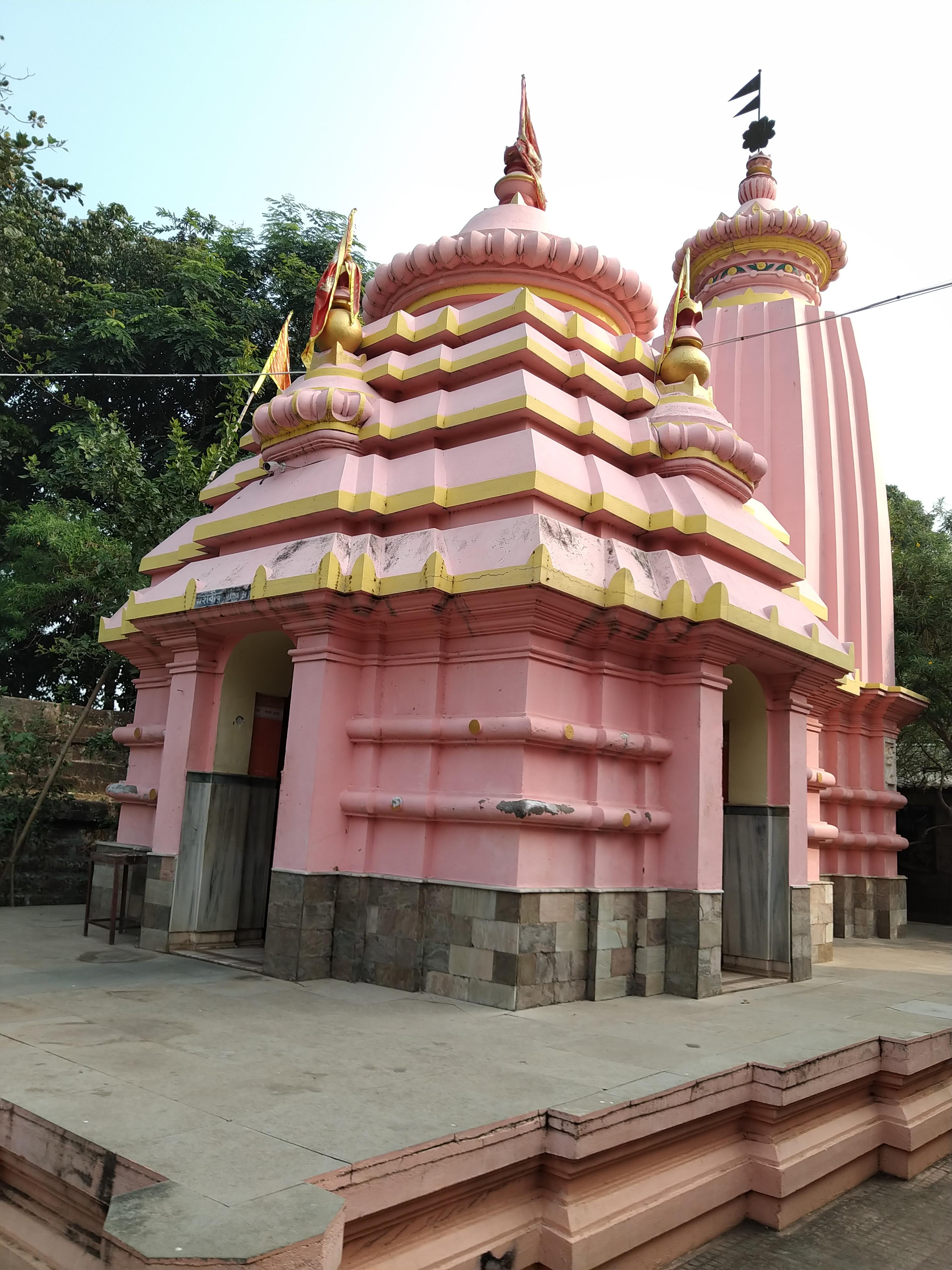
Mahamaya temple

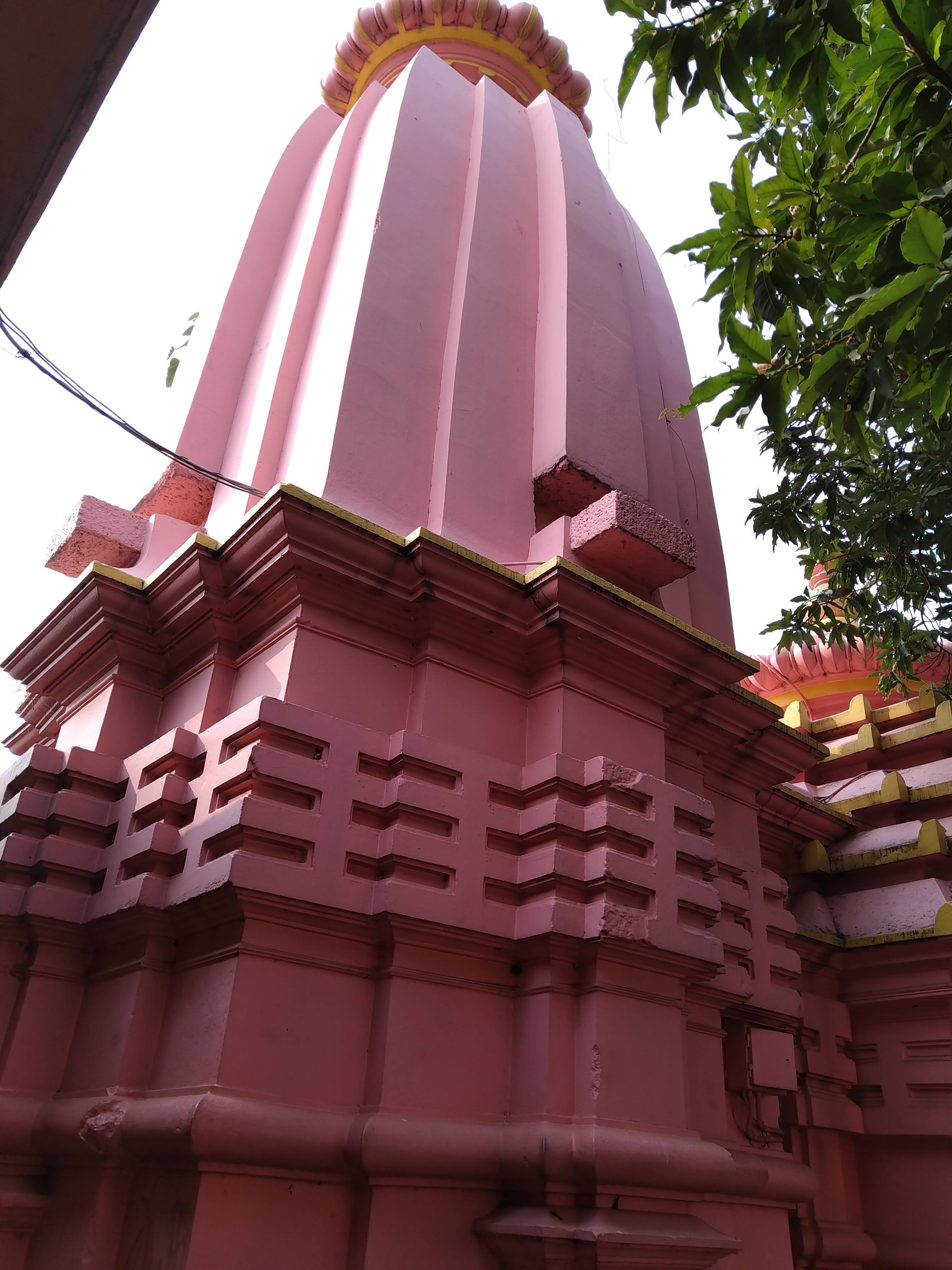
Jogmaya temple

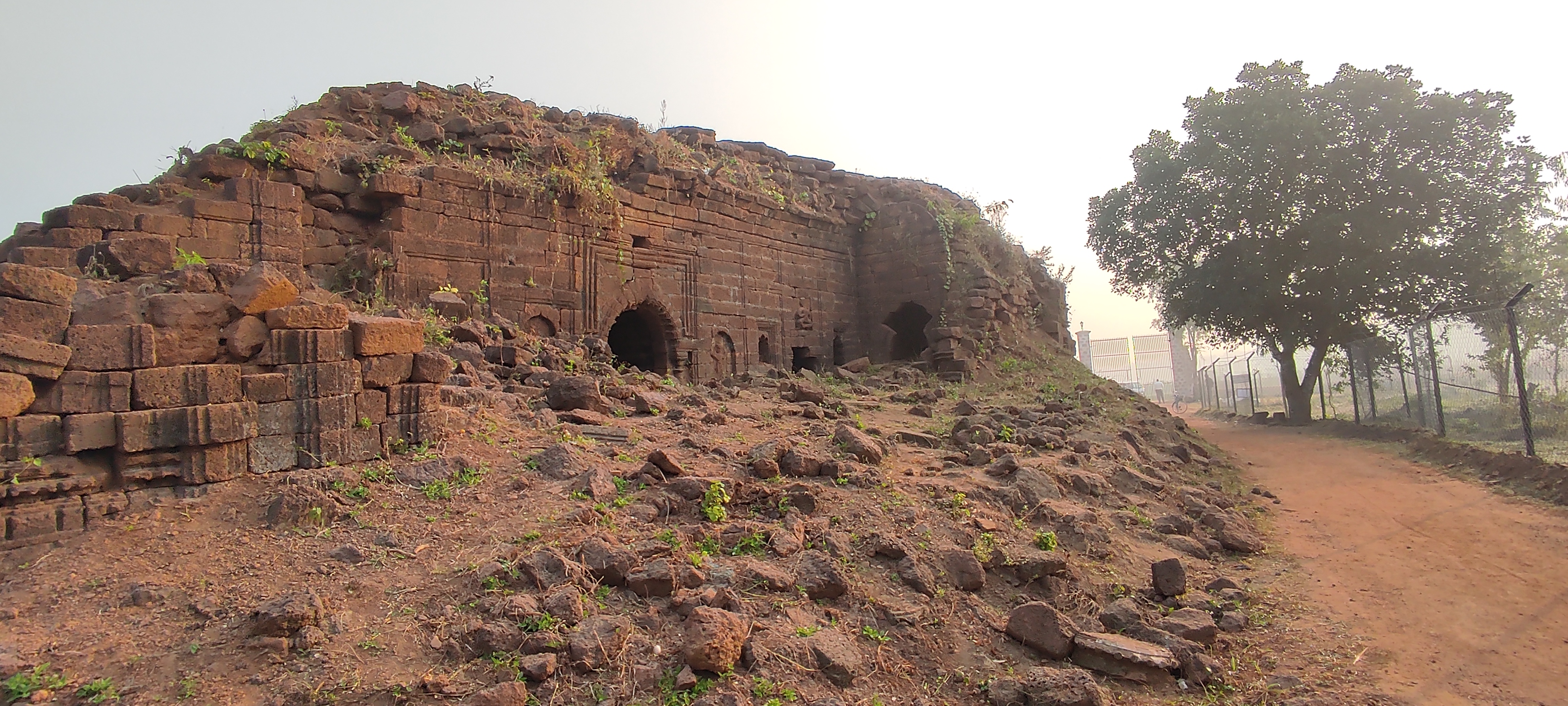
Ruins of fort of Rani Shiromani

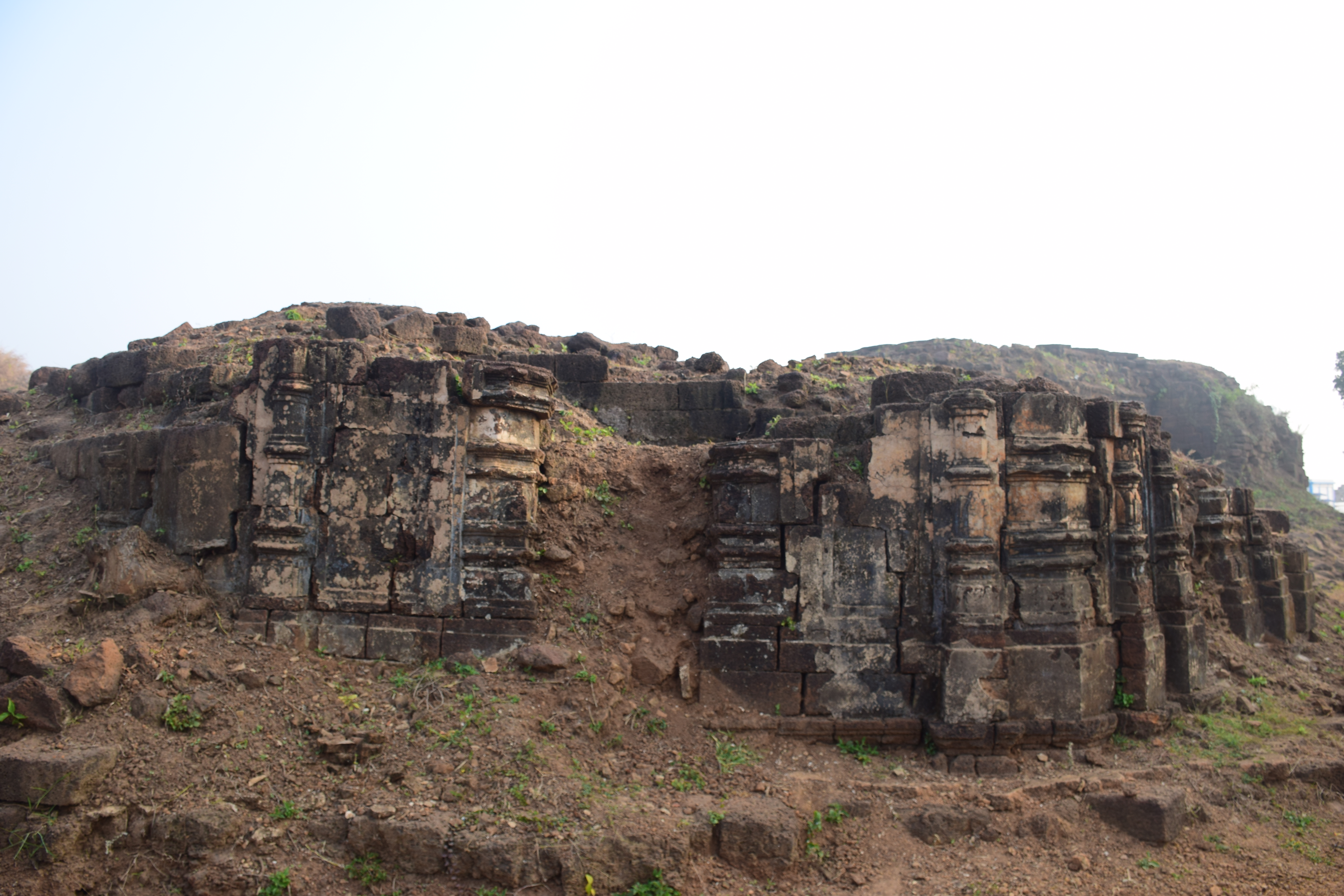
Ruins of fort of Rani Shiromani

== See also ==
- Midnapore Raj
- Narajole Raj
