= Narajole Raj =

The Narajole Raj was a medieval royal dynasty and later a zamindari (estate) during the British period at Narajole in Paschim Medinipur district in the state of West Bengal. The Raja of Narajole was one of the largest landholders in Midnapore. The kings of Narajole had a close link with the rulers of Karnagarh.

== History ==
According to Binoy Ghosh, Narajole's ruling clan, belonging to the Sadgop community, was founded by Uday Narayan Ghosh. His great grandson, Raja Kartickram, was honoured with the title 'Roy' by the Mughal emperor. The family used the title till in the eighth generation, when Raja Balwant was honoured with the 'Khan' title for some praise-worthy achievement. Thereafter, they used that title.

Raja Ajit Singh, the last king of the Midnapore zamindari, with its headquarters at Karnagarh, died childless in 1749. They were close to the rulers of Narajole. His two queens, who inherited the Midnapore zamindari, ran into great difficulties during the Chuar rebellion and sought the support of Raja Trilochan Khan of Narajole. After Raja Trilochan Khan's death, the responsibility of looking after the Midnapore zamindari and Rani Shiromani of Karnagarh (the other queen had died by then) fell successively on Raja Motiram and Raja Sitaram. Rani Shiromani loved Sitaram's eldest son, Anandalal, as her own son and handed over the entire Midnapore zamindari to him in 1800. Anandalal died childless and as per his wishes his brothers became the owners — Nandalal Khan of Narajole Zamindari and Mohanlal Khan of Midnapore Rajbari.

== The Palace ==
=== Narjole Rajbari ===
Narajole's Rajbari or Garh Narajole, was spread over 500 bighas and divided in to the inner and outer segments. The outer segment housed the poorer people, amongst whom were some painter families, who had survived the travails of life and in 1970 continued to produce dolls, painted pots and decorative wall plates. The inner segment was an ‘Indrapuri’ (the palace of heaven) consisting of splendid buildings (including the three-storeyed palace) temples, gardens etc. The large entrance gate lead to a spacious garden, with a temple of the family deity, Sitaramjiu. The drawing rooms were filled with selected country made and foreign showpieces and pictures of the royalty. On the way out, one again got to see a mix of gardens, ponds and residential quarters, with some Shiva temples nearby. There were many other temples. On the southern side were rangmahal, rasmancha and dolmancha.

=== Hawa Mahal ===
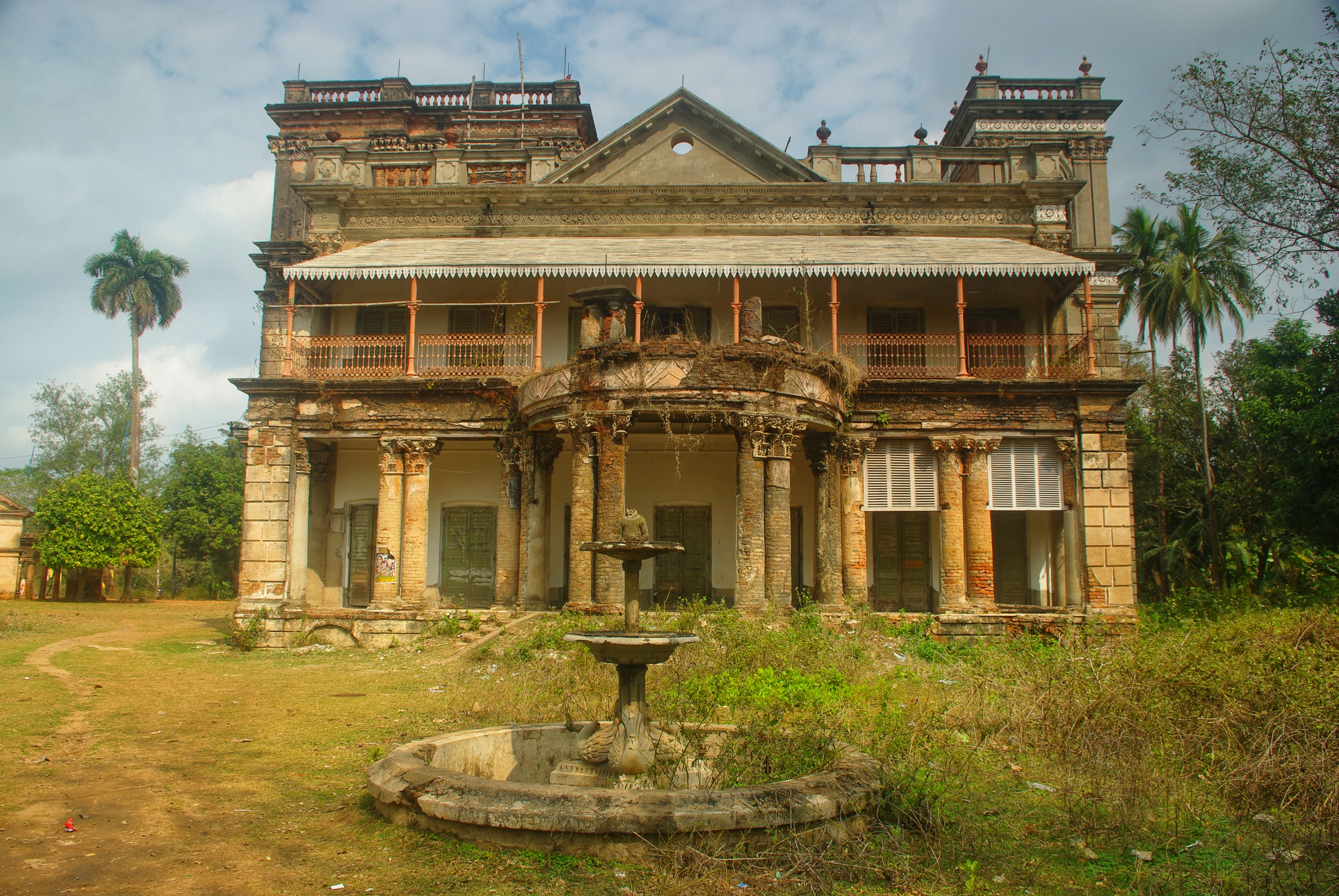

The Hawa Mahal (ballroom) is spread over 60 bigha land, surrounded by a parikha. Lankagarh, about a kilometer from main Rajbari houses fifty four temples. A 10-bigha plot was donated for a degree college.

== Narajole Picture Gallery ==
Narajole Rajbari with 250 rooms

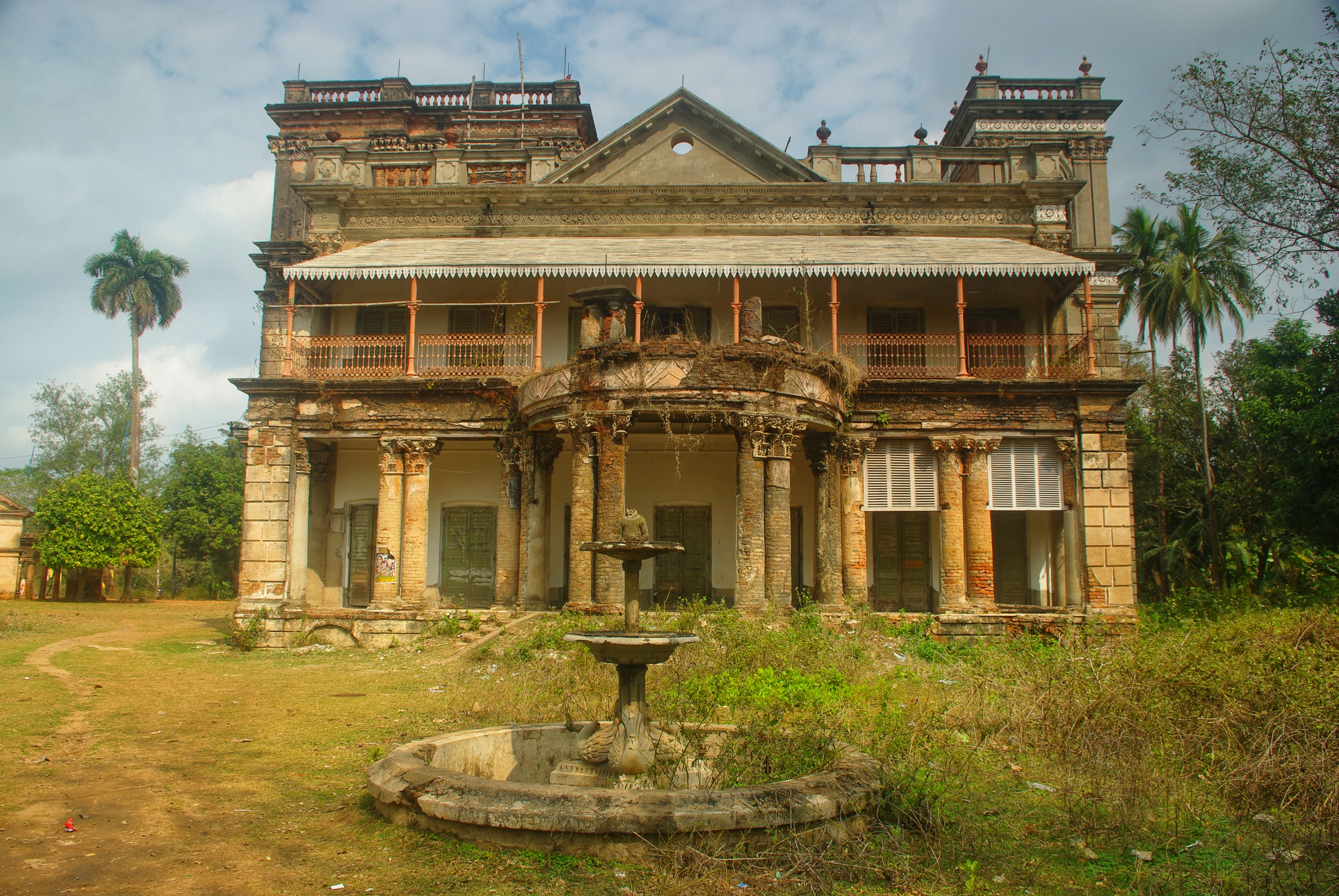
Hawa Mahal

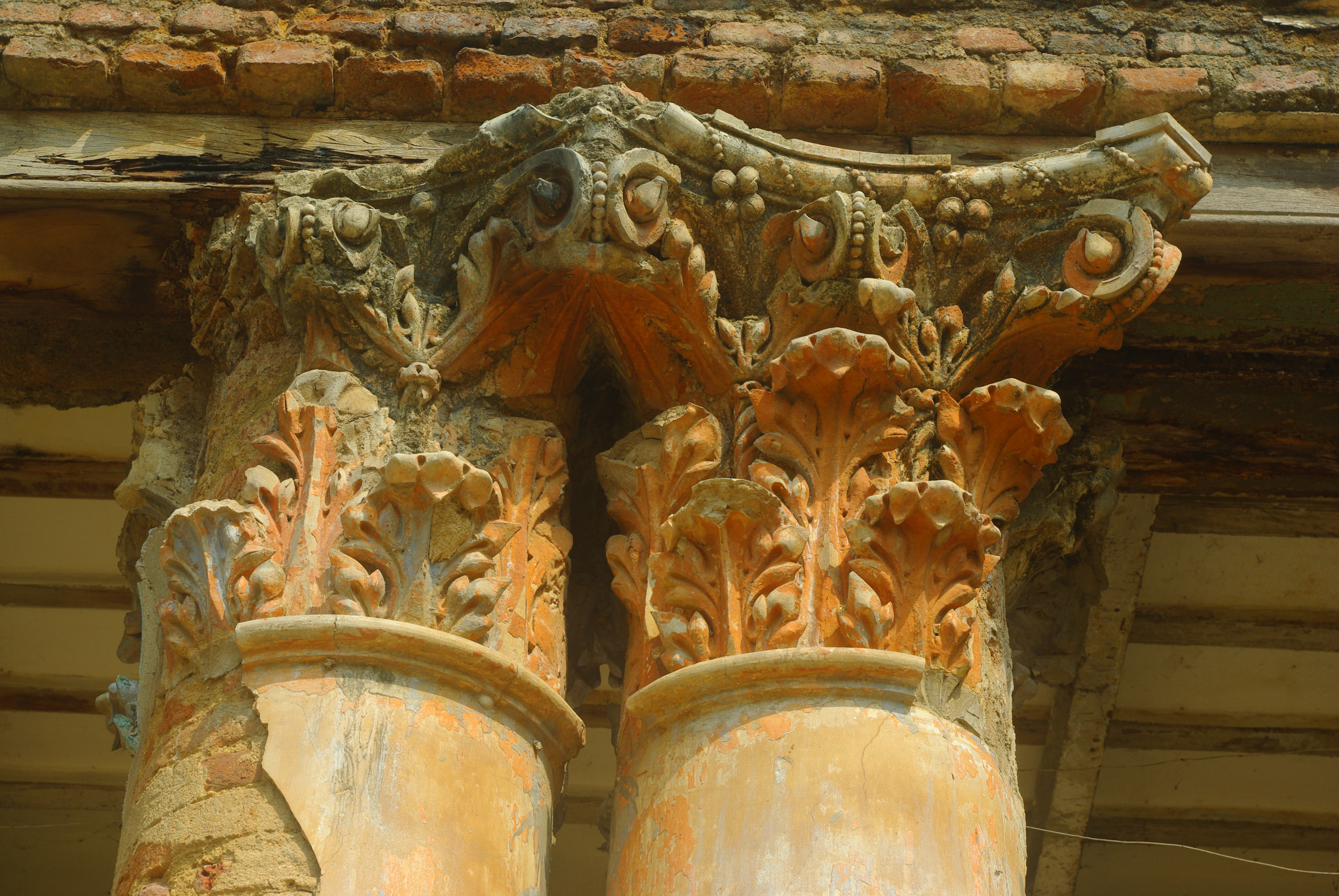
Hawa Mahal

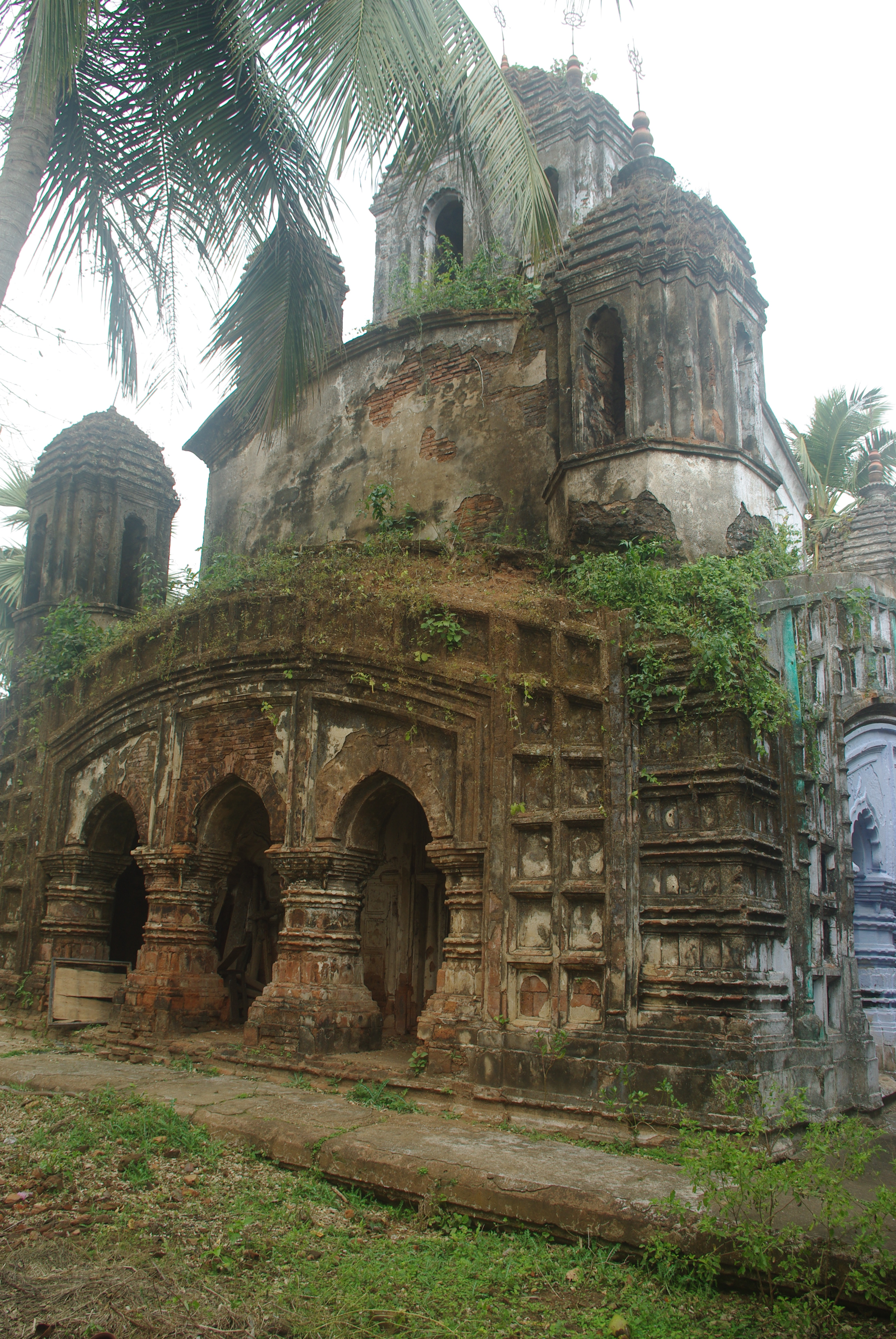
Govinda Jiu temple inside Narajole Rajbari

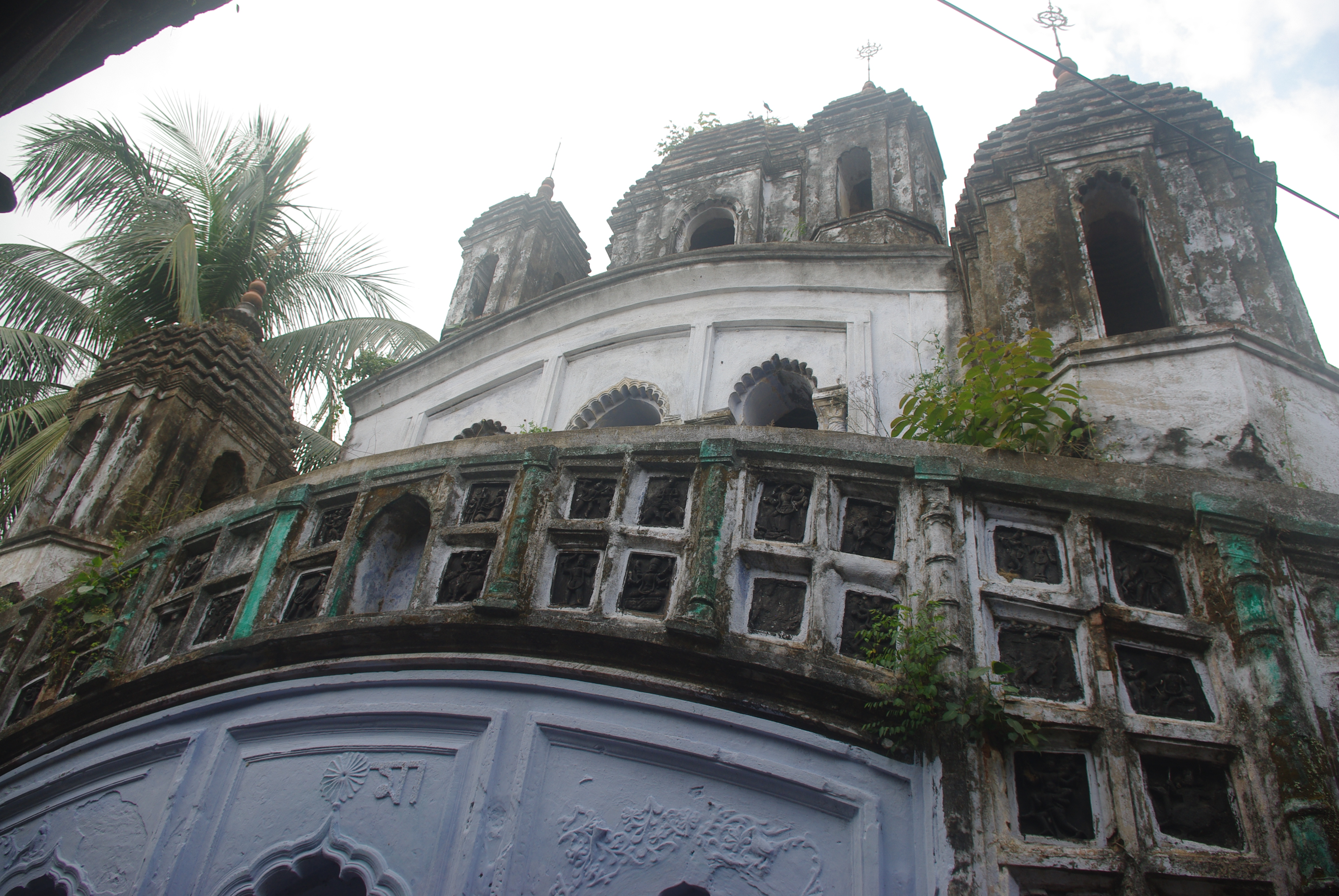
Govinda Jiu temple

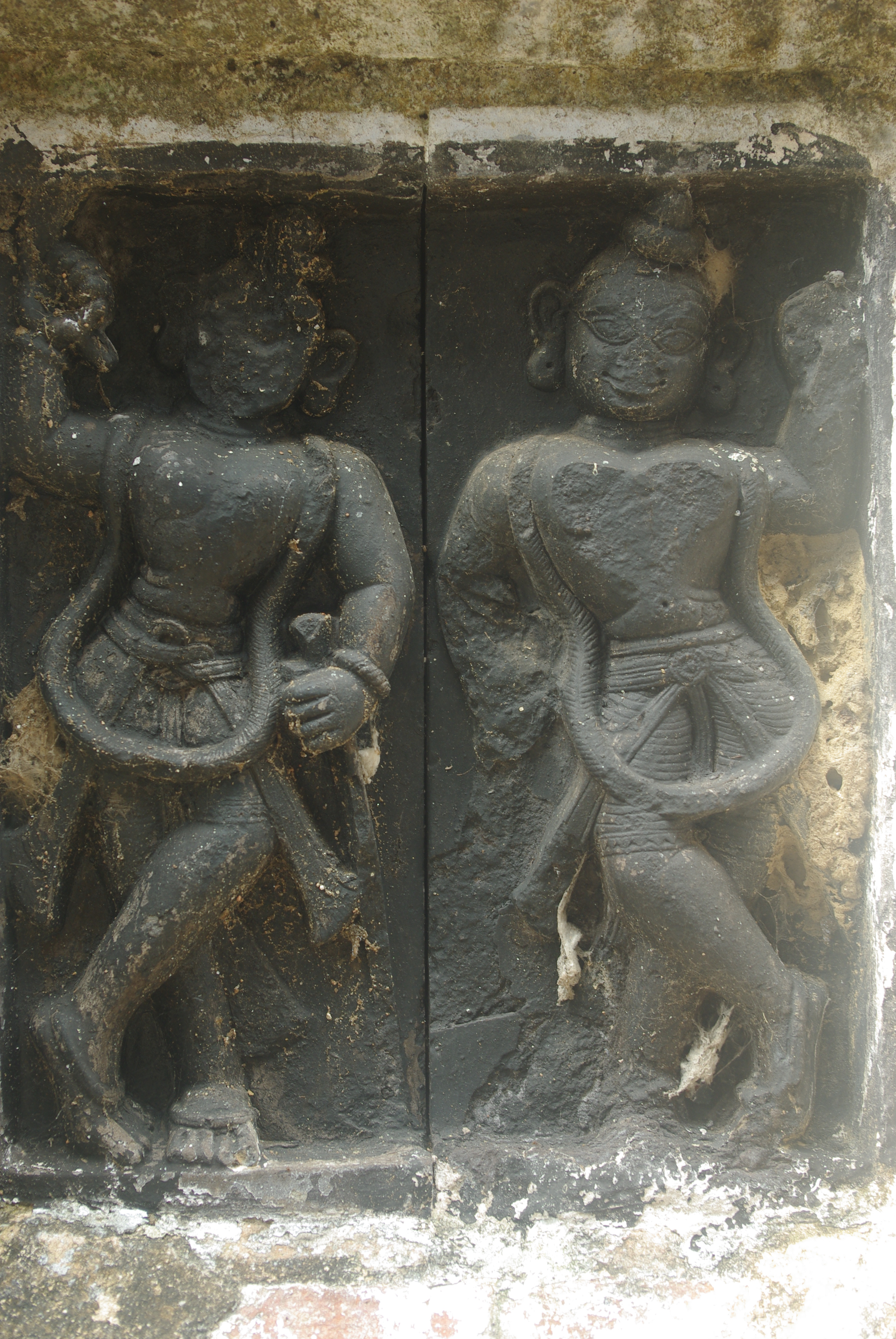
Basalt stone sculpture in Gobinda Jiu temple

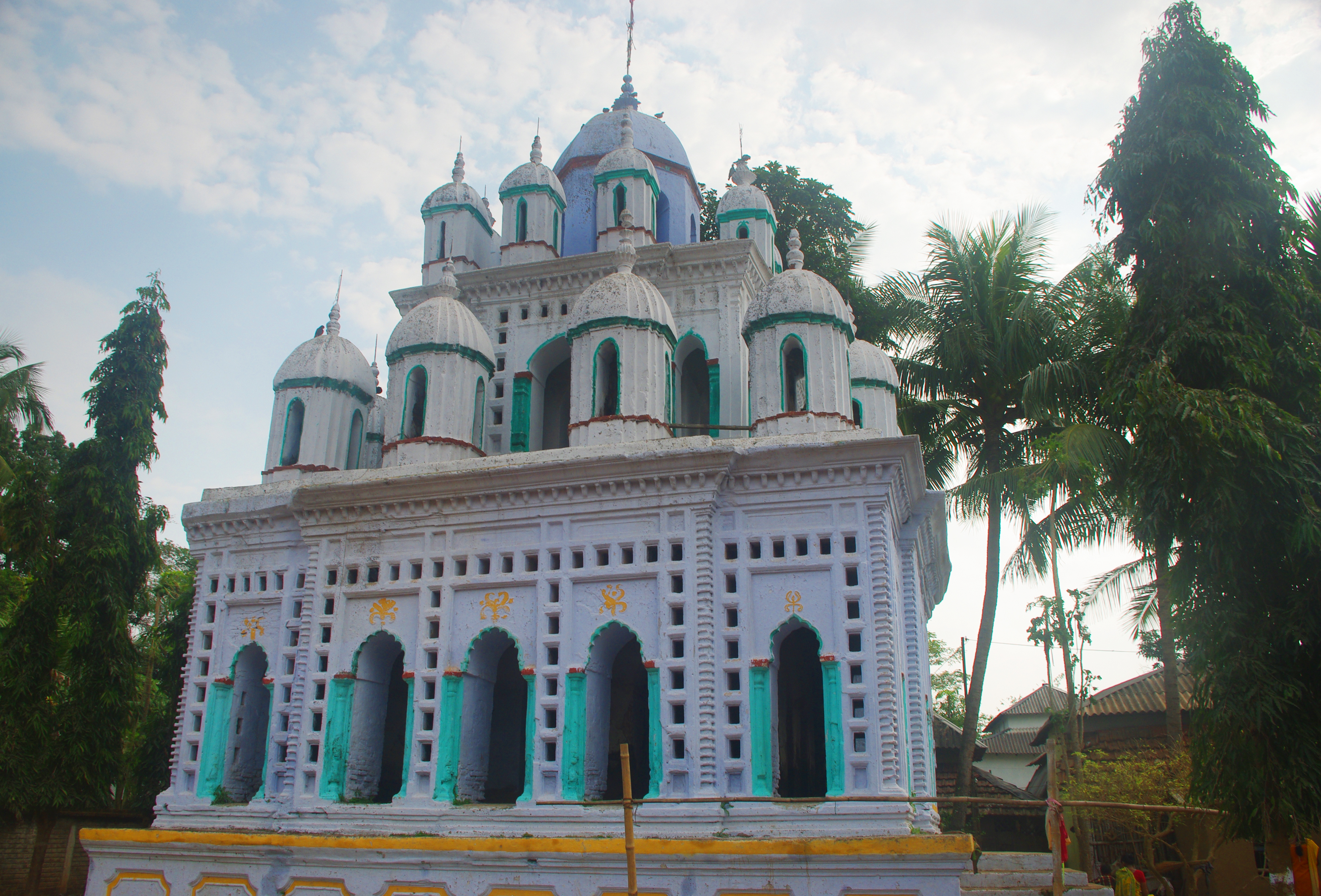
Rasmancha with 25 pinnacles

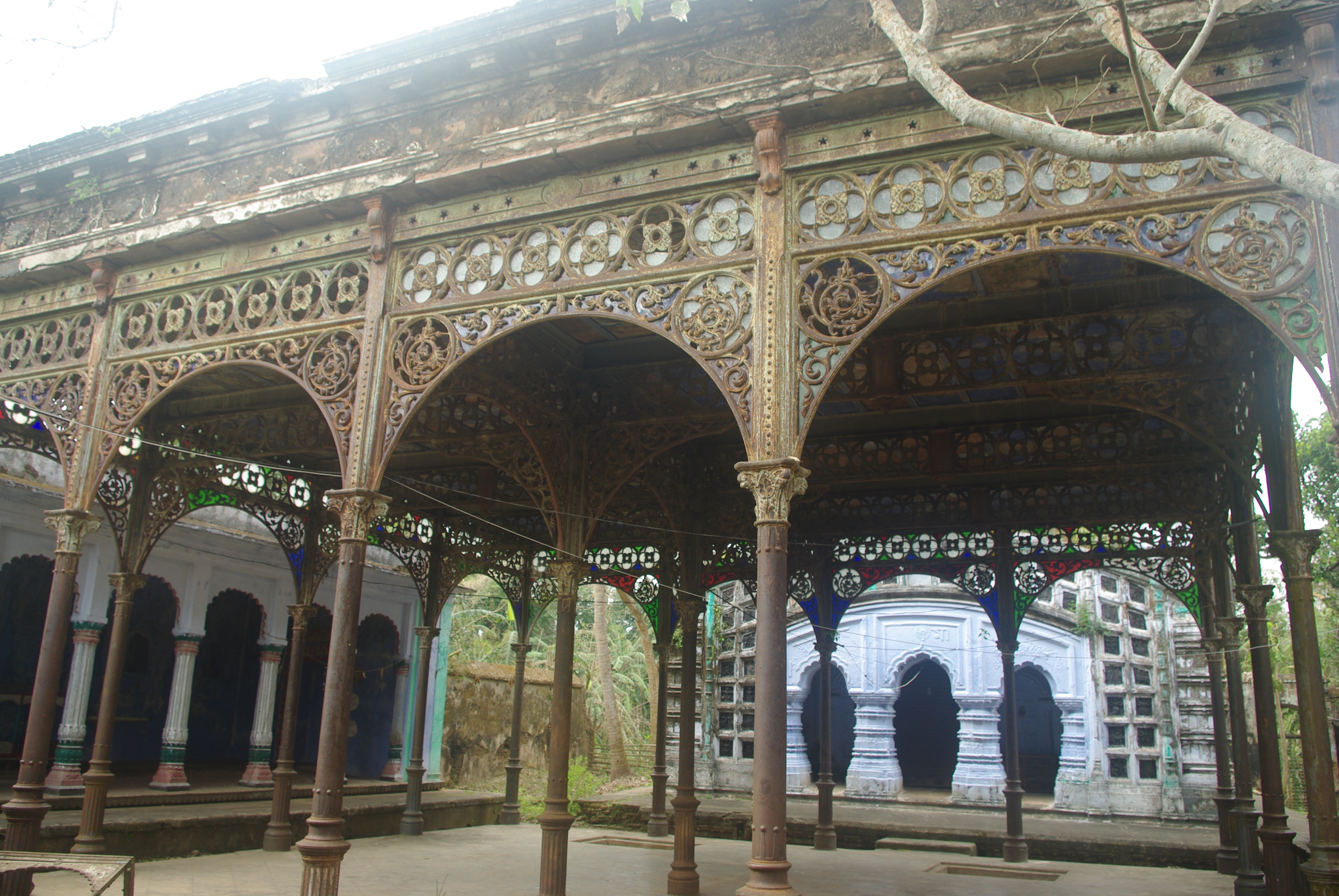
Durga Dalan inside Narajole Rajbari

== See also ==
- Narajole
- Karnagarh Raj
- Narayangarh Raj
