= Sankarpur =

Sankarpur may refer to the following places:

- Sankarpur, Paschim Bardhaman, West Bengal, India
- Sankarpur, Sarlahi, Janakpur Zone, Nepal
- Sankarpur, Darchula, Mahakali Zone, Nepal
- Sankarpur, Kanchanpur, Mahakali Zone, Nepal
