= Dalurband =

- Neighborhood in Pandaveswar, Durgapur, West Bengal
- Location in West Bengal, India Dalurband (India)
- Coordinates: 23°42′49.0″N 87°15′13.3″E
- Country: India
- City: Durgapur
- State: West Bengal
- District: Paschim Bardhaman

Area
  - Total: 7.95 km^{2} (3.07 sq mi)

Population (2011)
  - Total: 15,107
  - Density: 1,900/km^{2} (4,920/sq mi)

Languages*
  - Official: Bengali, Hindi, English
- Time zone: UTC+5:30 (IST)
- PIN: 713346
- Telephone code/STD: 0341
- Vehicle registration: WB
- Lok Sabha constituency: Bardhaman-Durgapur
- Vidhan Sabha constituency: Pandaveswar
- Website: paschimbardhaman.co.in

Dalurband is a neighborhood in the Pandaveswar area of Durgapur in West Bengal, India. It is one of Pandaveswar's colliery areas.

== Geography ==
Cities, towns and ECL Areas in the northern portion of Durgapur subdivision in Paschim Bardhaman district
MC: Municipal Corporation, CT: census town, R: rural administrative centre
Owing to space constraints in the small map, the actual locations in a larger map may vary slightly

=== Location ===
Mahal, Baidyanathpur, Dalurband, Ramnagar, Bilpahari and Kendra Khottamdi form a cluster of census towns in the northern portion of Pandabeswar CD block.

=== Urbanisation ===
According to the 2011 census, 79.22% of the population of the Durgapur subdivision was urban and 20.78% was rural. The Durgapur subdivision has 1 municipal corporation at Durgapur and 38 (+1 partly) census towns (partly presented in the map alongside; all places marked on the map are linked in the full-screen map).

== Demographics ==
According to the 2011 Census of India, Dalurbandh had a total population of 15,107, of which 7,978 (53%) were males and 7,129 (47%) were females. Population in the age range 0–6 years was 1,951. The total number of literate persons in Dalurbandh was 9,475 (77.02% of the population over 6 years).

*For language details see Pandabeswar (community development block)#Language and religion

As of 2001 India census, Dalurband had a population of 14,978. Males constitute 56% of the population and females 44%. Dalurband has an average literacy rate of 59%, lower than the national average of 59.5%: male literacy is 68% and, female literacy is 47%. In Dalurband, 13% of the population is under 6 years of age.

== Infrastructure ==
According to the District Census Handbook 2011, Bardhaman, Dalurbandh covered an area of 7.95 km^{2}. Among the civic amenities, the protected water-supply involved service reservoir, tap water from treated sources, uncovered wells. It had 1,198 domestic electric connections. Among the medical facilities it had were 6 dispensaries/ health centres, 8 medicine shops. Among the educational facilities it had were 4 primary schools. Other education facilities at Pandabeswar 2/3 km away. Among the important commodities it produced were soap, coal, mustard oil.

== Economy ==
Collieries in the Pandaveswar Area of Eastern Coalfields are: Madaipur, Mandarbani, Nutandanga, Pandaveswar, Dalurbandh, Kendra, Samla, South Samla, Khottadih, Kankartala, Dalurbandh OCP, Palasthali OCP and Gangaramchak OCP.

== Education ==
Dalurband has two primary schools.

== Healthcare ==
Medical facilities (dispensaries) in the Pandaveswar Area of ECL are available at Pandaveswar Area PME Centre (PO Pandaveswar), Madhaipur (PO Nutundanga), Mandarboni (PO Nutundanga), South Samla (PO Pandaveswar), Pandaveswar (PO Pandaveswar), Dalurbandh (PO Pandaveswar), Khottadih (PO Khottadih), Area Dispensary (PO Pandaveswar).
