= Mahal, Paschim Bardhaman =

Mahal
- Census Town
- Location in West Bengal, India Mahal (India)
- Coordinates: 23.703352°N 87.289569°E
- Country: India
- State: West Bengal
- District: Paschim Bardhaman

Area
  - Total: 3.3532 km^{2} (1.2947 sq mi)

Population (2011)
  - Total: 4,841
  - Density: 1,444/km^{2} (3,739/sq mi)

Languages*
  - Official: Bengali, Hindi, English
- Time zone: UTC+5:30 (IST)
- PIN: 713219
- Telephone/STD code: 0341
- Vehicle registration: WB
- Lok Sabha constituency: Asansol
- Vidhan Sabha constituency: Pandaveswar
- Website: paschimbardhaman.co.in

Mahal is a census town in the Pandabeswar CD block in the Durgapur subdivision of the Paschim Bardhaman district in the Indian state of West Bengal.

== Geography ==
Cities, towns and ECL Areas in the northern portion of Durgapur subdivision in Paschim Bardhaman district
MC: Municipal Corporation, CT: census town, R: rural administrative centre
Owing to space constraints in the small map, the actual locations in a larger map may vary slightly

=== Location ===
Mahal is located at 23.703352°N 87.289569°E.

Mahal, Baidyanathpur, Dalurband, Ramnagar, Bilpahari and Kendra Khottamdi form a cluster of census towns in the northern portion of Pandabeswar CD block.

=== Urbanisation ===
According to the 2011 census, 79.22% of the population of the Durgapur subdivision was urban and 20.78% was rural. The Durgapur subdivision has 1 municipal corporation at Durgapur and 38 (+1 partly) census towns (partly presented in the map alongside; all places marked on the map are linked in the full-screen map).

== Demographics ==
According to the 2011 Census of India, Mahal had a total population of 4,841 of which 2,510 (52%) were males and 2,331 (48%) were females. Population in the age range 0–6 years was 647. The total number of literate persons in Mahal was 3,078 (73.39% of the population over 6 years).

*For language details see Pandabeswar (community development block)#Language and religion

== Infrastructure ==
According to the District Census Handbook 2011, Bardhaman, Mahal covered an area of 3.3532 km^{2}. Among the civic amenities, the protected water-supply involved service reservoir, tap water from treated sources, uncovered wells. It had 418 domestic electric connections. Among the medical facilities there is a dispensary/ health centre 1 km away. Among the educational facilities it had were 2 primary schools, 1 middle school, the nearest secondary school, senior secondary school at Pandabeswar 2 km away.

== Economy ==
As per the ECL website telephone numbers, operational collieries in the Pandaveswar Area of Eastern Coalfields in 2018 are: Dalurband Colliery, Khottadih OCP, Khottadih UG, Madhaipur Colliery, Manderbony Colliery, Pandaveswar Colliery and South Samla Colliery.
