= Nabgram =

- Census Town
- Location in West Bengal, India Nabgram (India)
- Coordinates: 23.678565°N 87.244724°E
- Country: India
- State: West Bengal
- District: Paschim Bardhaman

Area
  - Total: 4.51 km^{2} (1.74 sq mi)

Population (2011)
  - Total: 4,626
  - Density: 1,030/km^{2} (2,660/sq mi)

Languages*
  - Official: Bengali, Hindi, English
- Time zone: UTC+5:30 (IST)
- PIN: 713363
- Telephone/STD code: 0341
- Vehicle registration: WB
- Lok Sabha constituency: Asansol
- Vidhan Sabha constituency: Pandaveswar
- Website: paschimbardhaman.co.in

Nabgram is a census town in the Pandabeswar CD block in the Durgapur subdivision of the Paschim Bardhaman district in the Indian state of West Bengal.

== Geography ==
Cities, towns and ECL Areas in the northern portion of Durgapur subdivision in Paschim Bardhaman district
MC: Municipal Corporation, CT: census town, R: rural administrative centre
Owing to space constraints in the small map, the actual locations in a larger map may vary slightly

=== Location ===
Nabgram is located at 23°40′43″N 87°14′41″E.

Konardihi, Nabgram, Chak Bankola, Sankarpur, Haripur, Bahula, Chhora and Parashkol form a cluster of census towns in the southern portion of Pandabeswar CD block.

=== Urbanisation ===
According to the 2011 census, 79.22% of the population of the Durgapur subdivision was urban and 20.78% was rural. The Durgapur subdivision has 1 municipal corporation at Durgapur and 38 (+1 partly) census towns (partly presented in the map alongside; all places marked on the map are linked in the full-screen map).

== Demographics ==
According to the 2011 Census of India, Nabgram had a total population of 4,626, of which 2,431 (53%) were males and 2,195 (47%) were females. Population in the age range 0–6 years was 609. The total number of literate persons in Nabgram was 3,032 (75.48% of the population over 6 years).

*For language details see Pandabeswar (community development block)#Language and religion

As of 2001 India census, Nabgram had a population of 4,643. Males constitute 54% of the population and females 46%. Nabgram has an average literacy rate of 58%, lower than the national average of 59.5%: male literacy is 68%, and female literacy is 46%. In Nabgram, 11% of the population is under 6 years of age.

== Infrastructure ==
According to the District Census Handbook 2011, Bardhaman, Nabgram covered an area of 4.51 km^{2}. Among the civic amenities, the protected water-supply involved service reservoir, tap water from treated sources, uncovered wells. It had 382 domestic electric connections. Among the medical facilities it had were 1 dispensary/ health centre. Among the educational facilities it had were 2 primary schools, other school facilities at Ukhra 3 km away. Among the social, recreational and cultural facilities it had was 1 public library. Among the important commodities it produced were coal, paddy, vegetables.

== Economy ==
As per the ECL website telephone numbers, operational collieries in the Bankola Area of Eastern Coalfields in 2018 are: Bankola Colliery, Khandra Colliery, Kumardih A Colliery, Kumardih B Colliery, Moira Colliery, Nakrakonda Colliery, Shankarpur Colliery, Shyamsundarpur Colliery and Tilaboni Colliery.

== Education ==
Nabgram has three primary schools.
