= Chak Bankola =

- Census Town
- Location in West Bengal, India Chak Bankola (India)
- Coordinates: 23.663236°N 87.240606°E
- Country: India
- State: West Bengal
- District: Paschim Bardhaman

Population (2011)
  - Total: 13,492

Languages
  - Official: Bengali, Hindi, English
- Time zone: UTC+5:30 (IST)
- PIN: 713363
- Telephone/STD code: 0341
- Vehicle registration: WB
- Lok Sabha constituency: Asansol
- Vidhan Sabha constituency: Pandaveswar
- Website: paschimbardhaman.co.in

Chak Bankola is a census town located partly in the Pandabeswar CD block and partly in the Andal CD block of the Durgapur subdivision in the Paschim Bardhaman district in the state of West Bengal, India.

== Geography ==
Cities, towns and ECL Areas in the northern portion of Durgapur subdivision in Paschim Bardhaman district
MC: Municipal Corporation, CT: census town, R: rural administrative centre
Owing to space constraints in the small map, the actual locations in a larger map may vary slightly

=== Location ===
Chak Bankola is located at 23°39′48″N 87°14′26″E.

Konardihi, Nabgram, Chak Bankola, Sankarpur, Haripur, Bahula, Chhora and Parashkol form a cluster of census towns in the southern portion of Pandabeswar CD Block.

=== Urbanisation ===
According to the 2011 census, 79.22% of the population of the Durgapur subdivision was urban and 20.78% was rural. Durgapur subdivision has 1 municipal corporation at Durgapur and 38 (+1 partly) census towns (partly presented in the map alongside; all places marked on the map are linked in the full-screen map).

== Demographics ==
According to the 2011 Census of India, the portion of Chak Bankola in Pandabeswar CD block had a total population of 11,527, of which 6,120 (53%) were males and 5,407 (47%) were females. Population in the age range 0–6 years was 1,422. The total number of literate people in this portion of Chak Bankola was 7,454 (73.77% of the population over 6 years). The portion of Chak Bankola in Andal CD block had a total population of 1,965, of 1,010 (51%) were males and 955 (49%) were females. Population in the age range 0–6 years was 284. The total number of literates in this portion of Chak Bankola was 1,203 (71.56% of the population over 6 years),

*For language details see Andal (community development block)#Language and religion

As of 2001 India census, Chak Bankola had a population of 10,318. Males constitute 57% of the population and females 43%. Chak Bankola has an average literacy rate of 55%, lower than the national average of 59.5%; with male literacy of 62% and female literacy of 46%. 11% of the population is under 6 years of age.

== Infrastructure ==
According to the District Census Handbook 2011, Bardhaman, Chak Bankola covered an area of 0.02+1.76 km^{2}. Among the civic amenities, it had 1 km roads with open drains, the protected water-supply involved overhead tank, tubewell, borewell, tap water from treated sources. It had 136+924 domestic electric connections. Among the medical facilities it had 2 dispensaries/ health centres, 2 family welfare centres, 1 nursing home, 1 veterinary hospital, 14 medicine shops. Among the educational facilities it had were 1+1 primary schools, other school facilities at Ukhra 1 km away, general degree college at Khandra 3 km away. Among the important commodities it manufactured was soap. It had the branch office of 1 nationalised bank.

== Economy ==
It is in the heart of the coal mining zone. It also has engineering workshops.

As of 2015–16, Purushattompur opencast project in Bankola Area of Eastern Coalfields has a mineable reserve of 8.0 million tonnes.

According to the ECL website telephone numbers, operational collieries in the Bankola Area of Eastern Coalfields in 2018 are: Bankola Colliery, Khandra Colliery, Kumardih A Colliery, Kumardih B Colliery, Moira Colliery, Nakrakonda Colliery, Shankarpur Colliery, Shyamsundarpur Colliery and Tilaboni Colliery.

== Education ==
Chak Bankola has one primary school.

== Healthcare ==
Medical facilities (periodic medical examination centres and dispensaries) in the Bankola Area of ECL are available at Bankola Area PME Centre (with 30 beds + 2 cabins) (PO Ukhra), Khandra (PO Khandra), Bankola Colliery (PO Khandra), Bankola Area (PO Khandra), Shyamsundarpur (PO Khandra), Mahira (PO Moira), Tilaboni (PO Pandabeswar), Nakrakonda (PO Pandabeswar), Shankarpur (PO Sheetalpur), Kumardihi A (PO Pandabeswar), Kumardihi B (PO Pandabeswar).
