= Chhora =

- Census Town
- Location in West Bengal, India Chhora (India)
- Coordinates: 23.668582°N 87.19872°E
- Country: India
- State: West Bengal
- District: Paschim Bardhaman

Area
  - Total: 5.64 km^{2} (2.18 sq mi)

Population (2011)
  - Total: 13,806
  - Density: 2,450/km^{2} (6,340/sq mi)

Languages*
  - Official: Bengali, Hindi, English
- Time zone: UTC+5:30 (IST)
- PIN: 713378
- Telephone/ STD code: 0341
- Vehicle registration: WB
- Lok Sabha constituency: Asansol
- Vidhan Sabha constituency: Pandaveswar
- Website: paschimbardhaman.co.in

Chhora is a census town in the Pandabeswar CD block in the Durgapur subdivision of the Paschim Bardhaman district in the state of West Bengal, India.

== Geography ==
Cities, towns and ECL Areas in the northern portion of Durgapur subdivision in Paschim Bardhaman district
MC: Municipal Corporation, CT: census town, R: rural administrative centre
Owing to space constraints in the small map, the actual locations in a larger map may vary slightly

=== Location ===
Chhora is located at 23°40′07″N 87°11′55″E.

Konardihi, Nabgram, Chak Bankola, Sankarpur, Haripur, Bahula, Chhora and Parashkol form a cluster of census towns in the southern portion of Pandabeswar CD block.

=== Urbanisation ===
According to the 2011 census, 79.22% of the population of the Durgapur subdivision was urban and 20.78% was rural. The Durgapur subdivision has 1 municipal corporation at Durgapur and 38 (+1 partly) census towns (partly presented in the map alongside; all places marked on the map are linked in the full-screen map).

== Demographics ==
According to the 2011 Census of India, Chhora had a total population of 13,806, of which 7,308 (53%) were males and 6,498 (47%) were females. Population in the age range 0–6 years was 1,721. The total number of literate persons in Chhora was 8,858 (73.30% of the population over 6 years).

*For language details see Pandabeswar (community development block)#Language and religion

As of 2001 India census, Chhora had a population of 12,839. Males constitute 55% of the population and females 45%. Chhora has an average literacy rate of 51%, lower than the national average of 59.5%; with male literacy of 60% and female literacy of 40%. 13% of the population is under 6 years of age.

== Infrastructure ==
According to the District Census Handbook 2011, Bardhaman, Chhora covered an area of 5.64 km^{2}. Among the civic amenities, the protected water-supply involved service reservoir, tap water from treated sources, uncovered wells. It had 1,149 domestic electric connections. Among the medical facilities it had were 1 hospital, 2 dispensaries/ health centres, 2 maternity/ child welfare centres, 1 nursing home, 1 charitable hospital/ nursing home, 4 medicine shops. Among the educational facilities it had were 3 primary schools, 1 secondary school, the nearest senior secondary school at Bahula 2.5 km away. It had 1 non-formal education centre (Sarva Shiksha Abhiyan) and 1 special school for disabled.

== Economy ==
It is in the heart of the coal mining zone.

According to the ECL website telephone numbers, operational collieries in the Kenda Area of Eastern Coalfields in 2018 are: Bahula Colliery, Chora Block Incline, CI Jambad Colliery, Chora OCP, Haripur Colliery, Lower Kenda Colliery, New Kenda Colliery, Siduli Colliery, SK OCP, West Kenda OCP.

== Education ==
Chhora has three primary and one higher secondary schools.

== Healthcare ==
Medical facilities (hospital/ dispensary) in the Kenda Area of ECL are available at Chhora Regional Hospital (with 30 beds) (PO Bahula), New Kenda (PO New Kenda), Lower Kenda (PO Haripur), Bahula (PO Bahula), CI Jambad (PO Bahula), Siduli (PO Siduli), Haripur (PO Haripur), CBI (PO Haripur), Chora Group pits (PO Haripur) ).
