= Konardihi =

Konardihi Kumardihi
- Census Town
- Location in West Bengal, India Konardihi (India)
- Coordinates: 23.673849°N 87.26498°E
- Country: India
- State: West Bengal
- District: Paschim Bardhaman

Area
  - Total: 7.11 km^{2} (2.75 sq mi)

Population (2011)
  - Total: 8,448
  - Density: 1,190/km^{2} (3,080/sq mi)

Languages*
  - Official: Bengali, Hindi, English
- Time zone: UTC+5:30 (IST)
- PIN: 713363
- Telephone/STD code: 0341
- Vehicle registration: WB
- Lok Sabha constituency: Asansol
- Vidhan Sabha constituency: Pandaveswar
- Website: paschimbardhaman.co.in

Konardihi is a census town in the Pandabeswar CD block in the Durgapur subdivision of the Paschim Bardhaman district in the Indian state of West Bengal.

== Geography ==
Cities, towns and ECL Areas in the northern portion of Durgapur subdivision in Paschim Bardhaman district
MC: Municipal Corporation, CT: census town, R: rural administrative centre
Owing to space constraints in the small map, the actual locations in a larger map may vary slightly

=== Location ===
Konardihi is located at 23°40′26″N 87°15′54″E.

Konardihi, Nabgram, Chak Bankola, Sankarpur, Haripur, Bahula, Chhora and Parashkol form a cluster of census towns in the southern portion of Pandabeswar CD block.

=== Urbanisation ===
As per the 2011 census, 79.22% of the population of Durgapur subdivision was urban and 20.78% was rural. Durgapur subdivision has 1 municipal corporation at Durgapur and 38 (+1 partly) census towns (partly presented in the map alongside; all places marked on the map are linked in the full-screen map).

== Demographics ==
According to the 2011 Census of India, Konardihi had a total population of 8,448, of which 4,470 (53%) were males and 4,018 (47%) were females. Population in the age range 0–6 years was 902. The total number of literate persons in Konardihi was 5,734 (75.59% of the population over 6 years).

*For language details see Pandabeswar (community development block)#Language and religion

As of 2001 India census, Konardihi had a population of 8,248. Males constitute 57% of the population and females 43%. Konardihi has an average literacy rate of 61%, higher than the national average of 59.5%: male literacy is 68%, and female literacy is 50%. In Konardihi, 11% of the population is under 6 years of age.

== Infrastructure ==
According to the District Census Handbook 2011, Bardhaman, Konardihi covered an area of 7.11 km^{2}. Among the civic amenities, the protected water-supply involved service reservoir, tap water from treated sources, uncovered wells. It had 764 domestic electric connections. Among the medical facilities it had were 1 dispensary/ health centre, 1 medicine shop. Among the educational facilities it had were 2 primary schools, 1 middle school, 1 secondary school, the nearest senior secondary school at Ukhra 3.5 km away. Among the social, recreational and cultural facilities it had were 1 public library and 1 reading room. Among the important commodities it produced were paddy and coal.

== Economy ==
It is in the heart of the coal mining zone.

As per the ECL website telephone numbers, operational collieries in the Bankola Area of Eastern Coalfields in 2018 are: Bankola Colliery, Khandra Colliery, Kumardih A Colliery, Kumardih B Colliery, Moira Colliery, Nakrakonda Colliery, Shankarpur Colliery, Shyamsundarpur Colliery and Tilaboni Colliery.

== Education ==
Konardihi has one primary and one secondary schools.

== Healthcare ==
Medical facilities (periodic medical examination centres and dispensaries) in the Bankola Area of ECL are available at Bankola Area PME Centre (with 30 beds + 2 cabins) (PO Ukhra), Khandra (PO Khandra), Bankola Colliery (PO Khandra), Bankola Area (PO Khandra), Shyamsundarpur (PO Khandra), Mahira (PO Moira), Tilaboni (PO Pandabeswar), Nakrakonda (PO Pandabeswar), Shankarpur (PO Sheetalpur), Kumardihi A (PO Pandabeswar), Kumardihi B (PO Pandabeswar).
