= Narendranath Chakraborty =

Indian politician

Narendranath Chakraborty (born 1964) is an Indian politician from West Bengal. He is a member of the West Bengal Legislative Assembly from Pandabeswar Assembly constituency in Paschim Bardhaman district. He won the 2021 West Bengal Legislative Assembly election representing the All India Trinamool Congress party.

== Early life and education ==
Chakraborty is from Pandabeswar, Paschim Bardhaman district, West Bengal. He is the son of Arindam Chakraborty. He studied Class 12 at Ukhra Kunjabehari Institution and passed the Higher Secondary examinations in 1982. He was a former employee with a public sector undertaking and his wife runs her own business.

== Career ==
Chakraborty won from Pandabeswar Assembly constituency representing the All India Trinamool Congress in the 2021 West Bengal Legislative Assembly election. He polled 73,922 votes and defeated his nearest rival, Jitendra Kumar Tewari of the Bharatiya Janata Party, by a margin of 3,803 votes.
