= Jamuria (community development block) =

- Community development block
- Location in West Bengal
- Coordinates: 23°40′26″N 87°08′24″E
- Country: India
- State: West Bengal
- District: Paschim Bardhaman
- Parliamentary constituency: Asansol
- Assembly constituency: Jamuria

Area
  - Total: 61.04 sq mi (158.10 km^{2})
- Elevation: 436 ft (133 m)

Population (2011)
  - Total: 123,176
  - Density: 2,017.9/sq mi (779.10/km^{2})
- Time zone: UTC+5.30 (IST)
- PIN: 713378 (Haripur); 713342 (Kenda); 713362 (Toposi); 713368 (Churulia)
- Telephone/STD code: 0341
- Vehicle registration: WB-37,WB-38,WB-41,WB-42,WB-44
- Literacy Rate: 69.42 per cent
- Website: http://bardhaman.gov.in/

Jamuria is a community development block that forms an administrative division in Asansol subdivision of Paschim Bardhaman district in the Indian state of West Bengal.

== Geography ==
Bahadurpur, a gram panchayat, is located at 23°40′26″N 87°08′24″E.

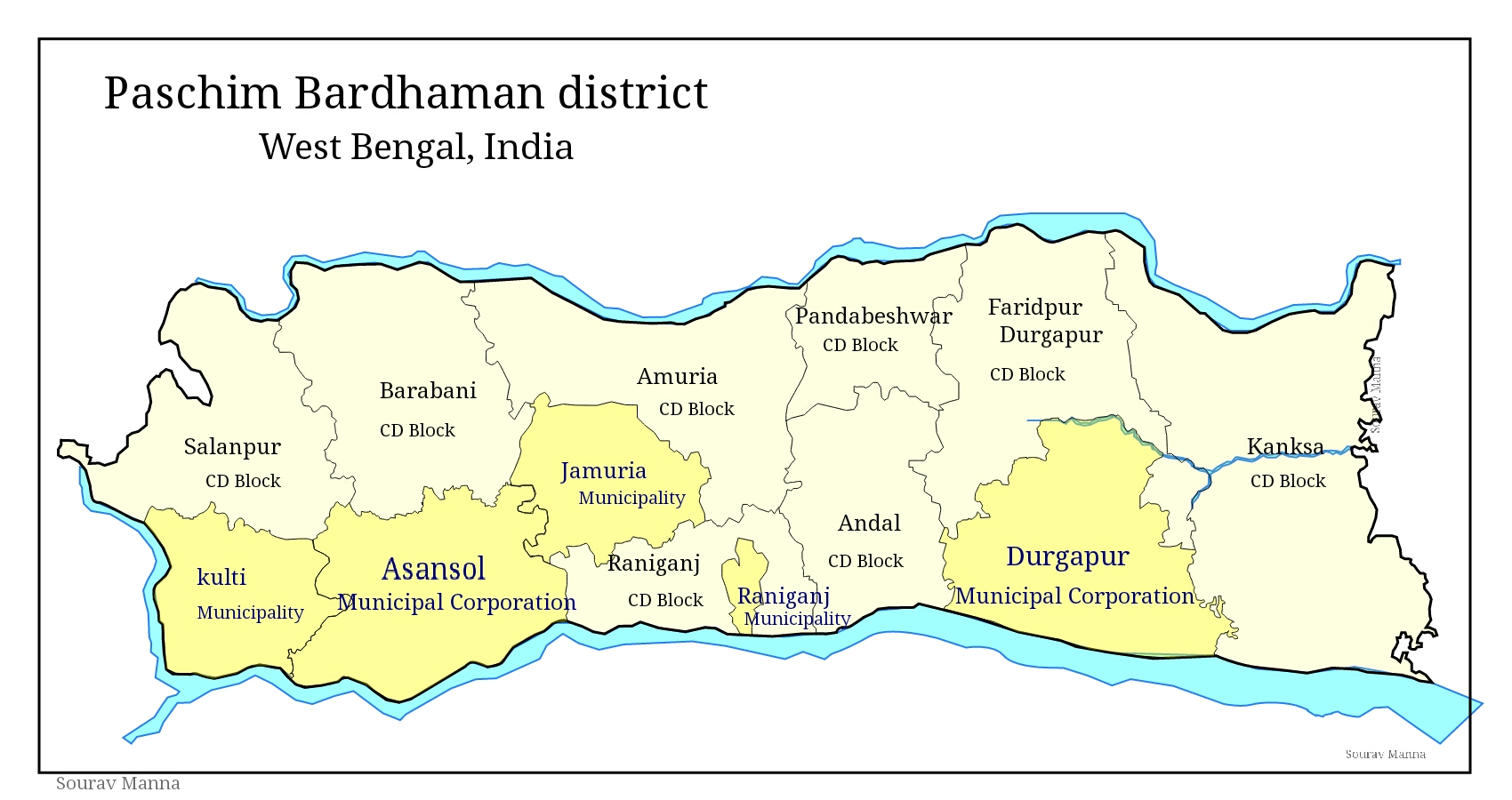
Map of Paschim Bardhaman district

Jamuria CD Block is part of the Ajay Damodar Barakar tract. This area is sort of an extension of the Chota Nagpur Plateau. It is a rocky undulating area with laterite soil, with the Ajay on the north, the Damodar on the south and the Barakar on the west. For ages the area was heavily forested and infested with plunderers and marauders. The discovery of coal, in the eighteenth century, led to industrialisation of the area and most of the forests have been cleared.

Jamuria CD Block is bounded by Nala CD Block, in Jamtara district of Jharkhand, and Khoyrasole CD Block in Birbhum district, on the north, Pandabeswar CD Block on the east, Asansol (municipal corporation) and Raniganj CD Block, on the south and Barabani CD Block on the west.

Jamuria CD Block has an area of 158.10 km^{2}. It has 1 panchayat samity, 10 gram panchayats, 93 gram sansads (village councils), 46 mouzas and 38 inhabited villages. Jamuria police station serves this block. Headquarters of this CD Block is at Bahadurpur.

Gram panchayats of Jamuria block/panchayat samiti are: Bahadurpur, Chinchuria, Churulia, Dobrana, Hijalgora, Kendra, Madantore, Parasea, Shyamalya and Tapsi.

== Demographics ==
=== Population ===
As per the 2011 Census of India Jamuria CD Block had a total population of 123,176, of which 75,144 were rural and 48,032 were urban. There were 64,578 (52%) males and 58,598 (48%) females. Population below 6 years was 15,141. Scheduled Castes numbered 37,793 (30.68%) and Scheduled Tribes numbered 10,272 (8.34%).

As per 2001 census, Jamuria block had a total population of 112,799, out of which 59,839 were males and 52,960 were females. Jamuria block registered a population growth of 12.96 per cent during the 1991-2001 decade. Decadal growth for Bardhaman district was 14.36 per cent. Decadal growth in West Bengal was 17.84 per cent. Scheduled castes at 39,449 formed around one-third the population. Scheduled tribes numbered 10,575.

Census Towns in Jamuria CD Block are (2011 census figures in brackets): Kunustara (5,127), Topsi (4,329), Nimsa (3,549), Chinchuria (6,617), Kenda (15,731), Parasia (8,894) and Kendra Khottamdi (part) (3,875).

Large villages (with 4,000+ population) in Jamuria CD Block are (2011 census figures in brackets): Churulia (8,173) and Hijalgora (5,374),

Other villages in Jamuria CD Block include (2011census figures in brackets): Bahadurpur (2,514), Dobrana (3,254), Madantore (2,813), Semalya (3,395) and Chhatrish Ganda (2,894). Villages are Andharia, Bagdiha, Baguli, Bahadurpur, Bamanband, Barul, Bataspur, Benasol, Bhaterdaha, Bhuri, Bijaynagar, Birkulti, Chak Dola, Chichurbil, Churulia, Dahuka, Darbardanga, Desher Mohan, Dhasla, Dhasna, Dobrana, Hijalgora, Jamsol, Jayantipur, Jaynagar, Jote Janaki, Khamarsol, Kumardiha, Laikapur, Lalbazar, Madhabpur, Madhudanga, Manpur, Patharchur, Rakhakura, Sarakdihi, Sattar, Shankheri, Sidhpur and Taltore.

=== Literacy ===
As per the 2011 census the total number of literates in Jamuria CD Block was 75,001 (69.42% of the population over 6 years) out of which males numbered 45,006 (79.41% of the male population over 6 years) and females numbered 29,995 (58.40% of the female population over 6 years). The gender disparity (the difference between female and male literacy rates) was 21.01%.

As per 2001 census, Jamuria block had a total literacy of 67.29 per cent for the 6+ age group. While male literacy was 79.09 per cent female literacy was 53.86 per cent. Bardhaman district had a total literacy of 70.18 per cent, male literacy being 78.63 per cent and female literacy being 60.95 per cent.

See also – List of West Bengal districts ranked by literacy rate

Literacy in CD blocks of
Bardhaman district
Bardhaman Sadar North subdivision
Ausgram I – 69.39%
Ausgram II – 68.00%
Bhatar – 71.56%
Burdwan I – 76.07%
Burdwan II – 74.12%
Galsi II – 70.05%
Bardhaman Sadar South subdivision
Khandaghosh – 77.28%
Raina I – 80.20%
Raina II – 81.48%
Jamalpur – 74.08%
Memari I – 74.10%
Memari II – 74.59%
Kalna subdivision
Kalna I – 75.81%
Kalna II – 76.25%
Manteswar – 73.08%
Purbasthali I – 77.59%
Purbasthali II – 70.35%
Katwa subdivision
Katwa I – 70.36%
Katwa II – 69.16%
Ketugram I – 68.00%
Ketugram II – 65.96%
Mongalkote – 67.97%
Durgapur subdivision
Andal – 77.25%
Faridpur Durgapur – 74.14%
Galsi I – 72.81%
Kanksa – 76.34%
Pandabeswar – 73.01%
Asansol subdivision
Barabani – 69.58%
Jamuria – 69.42%
Raniganj – 73.86%
Salanpur – 78.76%
2011 Census: CD Block Wise

Primary Census Abstract Data

=== Language and religion ===
Religion in Jamuria CD block (2011)
Hinduism	88.18%
Islam	11.21%
Other or not stated	0.62%

In the 2011 census Hindus numbered 108,613 and formed 88.18% of the population in Jamuria CD Block. Muslims numbered 13,804 and formed 11.21% of the population. Christians numbered 121 and formed 0.10% of the population. Others numbered 638 and formed 0.52% of the population.

Languages of Jamuria CD block (2011)
1. Bengali (73.5%)
2. Hindi (16.2%)
3. Santali (5.92%)
4. Bhojpuri (1.21%)
5. Others (3.11%)

At the time of the 2011 census, 73.52% of the population spoke Bengali, 16.24% Hindi, 5.92% Santali and 1.21% Bhojpuri as their first language.

== Rural poverty ==
As per poverty estimates obtained from household survey for families living below poverty line in 2005, rural poverty in Jamuria CD Block was 22.99%.

== Economy ==
=== Livelihood ===
Livelihood
in Jamuria CD Block
1. Cultivators (11.9%)
2. Agricultural labourers (27.2%)
3. Household industries (1.96%)
4. Other Workers (59.0%)

In Jamuria CD Block in 2011, amongst the class of total workers, cultivators numbered 4,897 and formed 11.91% of the total workers, agricultural labourers numbered 11,168 and formed 27.16%, household industry workers numbered 805 and formed 1.96% and other workers numbered 24,250 and formed 58.97%. Total workers numbered 41,120 and formed 33.38% of the total population, and non-workers numbered 82,056 and formed 66.82% of the population.

Coalmines are spread across the Andal, Pandaveswar, Raniganj, Jamuria, Barabani and Salanpur region, including municipal areas. Livelihood in this region is coal-centred. The area does not produce much of agricultural products. Overall work participation rate, and female work participation rate, in the mining area are low. Interestingly the work participation rate in the predominantly agricultural rural areas of erstwhile Bardhaman district is higher than in the predominantly urbanised mining area. Human development in the mining area does not at all look good. However, in the composite livelihood index the mining area performs much better than the non-mining areas of erstwhile Bardhaman district. The decadal (1991-2001) change in composition of workers shows the growing pressure of population growth, as well as of migrants from adjacent Jharkhand.

Note: In the census records a person is considered a cultivator, if the person is engaged in cultivation/ supervision of land owned by self/government/institution. When a person who works on another person's land for wages in cash or kind or share, is regarded as an agricultural labourer. Household industry is defined as an industry conducted by one or more members of the family within the household or village, and one that does not qualify for registration as a factory under the Factories Act. Other workers are persons engaged in some economic activity other than cultivators, agricultural labourers and household workers. It includes factory, mining, plantation, transport and office workers, those engaged in business and commerce, teachers, entertainment artistes and so on.

=== Infrastructure ===
All 46 or 100% of mouzas in Jamuria CD Block were electrified by 31 March 2014.

43 mouzas in Jamuria CD Block had drinking water facilities in 2013-14. There were 37 fertiliser depots, 3 seed stores and 34 fair price shops in the CD Block.

=== Coal mining ===
It is in the heart of the coal mining zone. With plenty of coal seams near the surface, illegal mining has been a long-standing problem in the area.

See also – Sripur Area, Satgram Area, Kunustoria Area and Kenda Area of Eastern Coalfields

=== Agriculture ===
Although the Bargadari Act of 1950 recognised the rights of bargadars to a higher share of crops from the land that they tilled, it was not implemented fully. Large tracts, beyond the prescribed limit of land ceiling, remained with the rich landlords. From 1977 onwards major land reforms took place in West Bengal. Land in excess of land ceiling was acquired and distributed amongst the peasants. Following land reforms land ownership pattern has undergone transformation. In 2013-14, persons engaged in agriculture in Jamuria CD Block could be classified as follows: bargadars 15.12%, patta (document) holders 18.66%, small farmers (possessing land between 1 and 2 hectares) 6.03%, marginal farmers (possessing land up to 1 hectare) 23.49% and agricultural labourers 36.71%.

In 2003-04 net cropped area in Jamuria CD Block was 14,130 hectares and the area in which more than one crop was grown was 2,579 hectares.

In 2013-14, Jamuria CD Block produced 5,425 tonnes of Aman paddy, the main winter crop, from 1,981 hectares and 13 tonnes of wheat from 6 hectares. It also produced pulses and oilseeds.

=== Banking ===
In 2013-14, Jamuria CD Block had offices of 8 commercial banks and 1 gramin bank.

== Transport ==
Jamuria CD Block has 1 ferry service and 5 originating/ terminating bus routes.

The Andal-Jamuria-Sitarampur branch line passes through this CD Block and there is a station at Jamuria.

== Education ==
In 2013-14, Jamuria CD Block had 65 primary schools with 6,645 students, 6 middle schools with 773 students, 6 high schools with 3,786 students and 7 higher secondary schools with 4,889 students. Jamuria CD Block had 1 general college with 557 students, and 198 institutions for special and non-formal education with 7,632 students.

Kazi Nazrul Islam Mahavidyalaya was established in 1981 at Churulia. It is affiliated with Kazi Nazrul University.

== Culture ==
Kazi Nazrul Satabarshiki Bhawan at Churulia, birthplace of Kazi Nazrul Islam, in Jamuria block came up in the year of his birth centenary.

== Healthcare ==
In 2014, Jamuria CD Block had 1 block primary health centre, 2 primary health centres and 2 central government/ PSU medical centres with total 93 beds and 20 doctors (excluding private bodies). It had 14 family welfare sub centres. 3,373 patients were treated indoor and 161,780 patients were treated outdoor in the hospitals, health centres and subcentres of the CD Block.

Bahadurpur Rural Hospital, with 30 beds at Bahadurpur, is the major government medical facility in the Jamuria CD block. Akalpur Block Primary Health Centre functions at Akalpur with 10 beds. There are primary health centres at Churulia (with 6 beds), Sirishdanaga, PO Mandi (with 6 beds), Birkulti (with 2 beds) and Chinchuria (with 6 beds).
