= Kendra Khottamdi =

- Census Town
- Location in West Bengal, India Kendra Khottamdi (India)
- Coordinates: 23.716683°N 87.208676°E
- Country: India
- State: West Bengal
- District: Paschim Bardhaman

Area
  - Total: 8.26 km^{2} (3.19 sq mi)

Population (2011)
  - Total: 10,750
  - Density: 1,300/km^{2} (3,370/sq mi)

Languages*
  - Official: Bengali, Hindi, English
- Time zone: UTC+5:30 (IST)
- PIN: 713380
- Telephone code/STD: 0341
- Vehicle registration: WB
- Lok Sabha constituency: Asansol
- Vidhan Sabha constituency: Pandaveswar
- Website: paschimbardhaman.co.in

Kendra Khottamdi is a census town located partly in the Pandabeswar CD block of the Durgapur subdivision and partly in the Jamuria CD block of the Asansol Sadar subdivision in Paschim Bardhaman district in the Indian state of West Bengal.

== Geography ==
Cities, towns and ECL Areas in the northern portion of Durgapur subdivision in Paschim Bardhaman district
MC: Municipal Corporation, CT: census town, R: rural administrative centre
Owing to space constraints in the small map, the actual locations in a larger map may vary slightly

=== Location ===
Kendra Khottadihi is located at 23°43′00″N 87°12′31″E.

Mahal, Baidyanathpur, Dalurband, Ramnagar, Bilpahari and Kendra Khottamdi form a cluster of census towns in the northern portion of Pandabeswar CD Block.

=== Urbanisation ===
According to the 2011 census, 79.22% of the population of Durgapur subdivision was urban and 20.78% was rural. Durgapur subdivision has 1 municipal corporation at Durgapur and 38 (+1 partly) census towns (partly presented in the map alongside; all places marked on the map are linked in the full-screen map).

== Demographics ==
According to the 2011 Census of India, the Pandabeswar portion of Kendra Khottamdi had a total population of 6,875 of which 3,571 (52%) were males and 3,304 (48%) were females. Population in the age range 0–6 years was 712. The total number of literate persons in the Pandabeswar portion was 4,278 (69.41% of the population over 6 years). The Jamuria portion of Kendra Khottamdi had a total population of 3,875 of which 1,961 (51%) were males and 1,914 (49%) were females. Population in the age range 0–6 years was 439. The total number of literate persons in the Jamuria portion was 2,191 (63.77% of the population over 6 years.

*For language details see Jamuria (community development block)#Language and religion

As of 2001 India census, Kendra Khottamdi had a population of 7,090. Males constitute 54% of the population and females 46%. Kendra Khottamdi has an average literacy rate of 60%, higher than the national average of 59.5%: male literacy is 69%, and female literacy is 49%. In Kendra Khottamdi, 13% of the population is under 6 years of age.

== Infrastructure ==
According to the District Census Handbook 2011, Bardhaman, Kendra Khottadihi covered an area of 5.29+2.97 km^{2}(covering two blocks). Among the civic amenities, it had 8+8 km roads with open drains, the protected water supply involved service reservoir, tap water from treated sources, uncovered wells. It had 621+300 domestic electric connections. Among the medical facilities, it had was 1 dispensary/ health centre. Among the educational facilities it had was 1 primary school, other nearest school facilities were at Alinagar 1 km away. Among the important commodities it manufactured was coal. It had the branch offices of 1 non-agricultural credit society.

== Economy ==
Collieries in the Pandaveswar Area of Eastern Coalfields are: Madaipur, Mandarbani, Nutandanga, Pandaveswar, Dalurbandh, Kendra, Samla, South Samla, Khottadih, Kankartala, Dalurbandh OCP, Palasthali OCP and Gangaramchak OCP.

== Education ==
Kendra Khottadihi has one primary and one higher secondary schools.

Pandaveswar Sri Jaipuria High School is a Bengali-medium coeducational institution established in 1951. It has facilities for teaching from class V to class XII. The school has 10 computers, a library with 1,000 books and a playground.

Shiv Durga Hindi High School is a Hindi-medium coeducational institution established in 1983. It has facilities for teaching from class V to class VIII.

Sree Joypuria Junior Hindi High School is a Hindi-medium (there is an obvious mistake in the source, as the name itself makes it clear) coeducational institution established in 2014. It has facilities for teaching from class V to class VIII.

== Healthcare ==
Medical facilities (dispensaries) in the Pandaveswar Area of ECL are available at Pandaveswar Area PME Centre (PO Pandaveswar), Madhaipur (PO Nutundanga), Mandarboni (PO Nutundanga), South Samla (PO Pandaveswar), Pandaveswar (PO Pandaveswar), Dalurbandh (PO Pandaveswar), Khottadih (PO Khottadih), Area Dispensary (PO Pandaveswar).
