= Salemgarh =

Village in India

- Village
- Country: India
- State: Uttar Pradesh
- Time zone: UTC+5:30 (IST)
- Area code: 274409

Salemgarh is a village in kushinagar division in the state of Uttar Pradesh, India. It is shares the same boundary with Bahadurpur.
