= Bahula =

- Census Town
- Location in West Bengal, India Bahula (India)
- Coordinates: 23.657419°N 87.195974°E
- Country: India
- State: West Bengal
- District: Paschim Bardhaman

Area
  - Total: 3.59 km^{2} (1.39 sq mi)

Population (2011)
  - Total: 17,510
  - Density: 4,880/km^{2} (12,600/sq mi)

Languages*
  - Official: Bengali, Hindi, English
- Time zone: UTC+5:30 (IST)
- PIN: 713322
- Telephone/STD code: 0341
- Vehicle registration: WB
- Lok Sabha constituency: Asansol
- Vidhan Sabha constituency: Pandaveswar
- Website: paschimbardhaman.co.in

Bahula is a census town in the Pandabeswar CD block in the Durgapur subdivision of the Paschim Bardhaman district in the state of West Bengal, India.

== Geography ==
Cities, towns and ECL Areas in the northern portion of Durgapur subdivision in Paschim Bardhaman district
MC: Municipal Corporation, CT: census town, R: rural administrative centre
Owing to space constraints in the small map, the actual locations in a larger map may vary slightly

=== Location ===
Bahula is located at 23°39′27″N 87°11′46″E.

The Asansol-Durgapur region is composed of undulating laterite soil. This area lies between two mighty rivers – the Damodar and the Ajay. They flow almost parallel to each other in the region – the average distance between the two rivers is around 30 km. For ages the area was heavily forested and infested with plunderers and marauders. The discovery of coal led to industrialisation of the area and most of the forests have been cleared.

Konardihi, Nabgram, Chak Bankola, Sankarpur, Haripur, Bahula, Chhora and Parashkol form a cluster of census towns in the southern portion of Pandabeswar CD block.

=== Urbanisation ===
According to the 2011 census, 79.22% of the population of the Durgapur subdivision was urban and 20.78% was rural. The Durgapur subdivision has 1 municipal corporation at Durgapur and 38 (+1 partly) census towns (partly presented in the map alongside; all places marked on the map are linked in the full-screen map).

== Demographics ==
According to the 2011 Census of India, Bahula had a total population of 17,510, of which 9,095 (52%) were males and 8,415 (48%) were females. Population in the age range 0–6 years was 2,202. The total number of literate persons in Bahula was 11,445 (74.76% of the population over 6 years).

*For language details see Pandabeswar (community development block)#Language and religion

As of 2001 India census, Bahula had a population of 16,264. Males constitute 55% of the population and females 45%. Bahula has an average literacy rate of 58%, lower than the national average of 59.5%; with 64% of the males and 36% of females literate. 13% of the population is under 6 years of age.

== Infrastructure ==
According to the District Census Handbook 2011, Bardhaman, Bahula covered an area of 3.59 km^{2}. Among the civic amenities, the protected water-supply involved service reservoir, tap water from treated sources. It had 1,472 domestic electric connections. Among the educational facilities it had were 5 primary schools, 2 middleschools, 1 secondary school, 1 senior secondary school. Among the important commodities it produced were coal, paddy and cement.

== Economy ==
This is a Coal Mining area. Bahula is part of Kenda Area of Eastern Coalfields Limited, a subsidiary of Coal India Limited. The area has been facing the problem of land subsidence. There are some engineering workshops at Bahula.

According to the ECL website telephone numbers, operational collieries in the Kenda Area of Eastern Coalfields in 2018 are: Bahula Colliery, Chora Block Incline, CI Jambad Colliery, Chora OCP, Haripur Colliery, Lower Kenda Colliery, New Kenda Colliery, Siduli Colliery, SK OCP and West Kenda OCP.

== Education ==
Bahula has three primary and one higher secondary schools.

Bahula Sashi Smriti High School is a co-educational higher secondary school.

== Healthcare ==
The Regional Hospital of Eastern Coalfields is located at Bahula.

Medical facilities (hospital/ dispensary) in the Kenda Area of ECL are available at Chhora Regional Hospital (with 30 beds) (PO Bahula), New Kenda (PO New Kenda), Lower Kenda (PO Haripur), Bahula (PO Bahula), CI Jambad (PO Bahula), Siduli (PO Siduli), Haripur (PO Haripur), CBI (PO Haripur), Chora Group pits (PO Haripur) ).
