= Baidyanathpur, Paschim Bardhaman =

Baidyanathpur
- Census Town
- Location in West Bengal, India Baidyanathpur (India)
- Coordinates: 23.720252°N 87.278569°E
- Country: India
- State: West Bengal
- District: Paschim Bardhaman

Area
  - Total: 2.42 km^{2} (0.93 sq mi)

Population (2011)
  - Total: 15,704
  - Density: 6,490/km^{2} (16,800/sq mi)

Languages*
  - Official: Bengali, Hindi, English
- Time zone: UTC+5:30 (IST)
- PIN: 713219
- Telephone code/STD: 0341
- Vehicle registration: WB
- Lok Sabha constituency: Asansol
- Vidhan Sabha constituency: Pandaveswar
- Website: paschimbardhaman.co.in

Baidyanathpur is a census town in the Pandabeswar CD block in the Durgapur subdivision of the Paschim Bardhaman district in the Indian state of West Bengal.

== Geography ==
Cities, towns and ECL Areas in the northern portion of Durgapur subdivision in Paschim Bardhaman district
MC: Municipal Corporation, CT: census town, R: rural administrative centre
Owing to space constraints in the small map, the actual locations in a larger map may vary slightly

=== Location ===
Baidyanathpur is located at 23.720252°N 87.278569°E.

The Asansol-Durgapur region is composed of undulating laterite region. This area lies between two mighty rivers – the Damodar and the Ajay. They flow almost parallel to each other in the region – the average distance between the two rivers is around 30 km. For ages the area was heavily forested and infested with plunderers and marauders. The discovery of coal in the 18th century led to industrialisation of the area and most of the forests have been cleared.

Mahal, Baidynathpur, Dalurband, Ramnagar, Bilpahari and Kendra Khottamdi form a cluster of census towns in the northern portion of Pandabeswar CD block.

=== Urbanisation ===
According to the 2011 census, 79.22% of the population of the Durgapur subdivision was urban and 20.78% was rural. The Durgapur subdivision has 1 municipal corporation at Durgapur and 38 (+1 partly) census towns (partly presented in the map alongside; all places marked on the map are linked in the full-screen map).

== Demographics ==
According to the 2011 Census of India, Baidyanathpur had a total population of 15,704 of which 8,132 (52%) were males and 7,572 (48%) were females. Population in the age range 0–6 years was 1,838. The total number of literate persons in Baidyanathpur was 9,475 (68.33% of the population over 6 years).

*For language details see Pandabeswar (community development block)#Language and religion

Pandabeswar is shown as part of Baidyanathpur in the map of Pandabeswar CD Block on page 243 of the District Census Handbook, Bardhaman, 2011.

== Infrastructure ==
According to the District Census Handbook 2011, Bardhaman, Baidyanathpur covered an area of 2.42 km^{2}. Among the civic amenities, the protected water-supply involved service reservoir, tap water from treated sources, uncovered wells. It had 1,322 domestic electric connections. Among the educational facilities it had were 2 primary schools, 2 secondary schools, 2 senior secondary schools.

== Economy ==
As per the ECL website telephone numbers, operational collieries in the Pandaveswar Area of Eastern Coalfields in 2018 are: Dalurband Colliery, Khottadih OCP, Khottadih UG, Madhaipur Colliery, Manderbony Colliery, Pandaveswar Colliery and South Samla Colliery.
