= Ramnagar, Pandaveswar =

Ramnagar
- Census Town
- Location in West Bengal, India Ramnagar (India)
- Coordinates: 23°43′59.5″N 87°15′55.1″E
- Country: India
- State: West Bengal
- District: Paschim Bardhaman

Area
  - Total: 5.94 km^{2} (2.29 sq mi)

Population (2011)
  - Total: 5,446
  - Density: 917/km^{2} (2,370/sq mi)

Languages*
  - Official: Bengali, Hindi, English
- Time zone: UTC+5:30 (IST)
- PIN: 713346
- Telephone code/STD: 0341
- Vehicle registration: WB
- Lok Sabha constituency: Asansol
- Vidhan Sabha constituency: Pandaveswar
- Website: paschimbardhaman.co.in

Ramnagar is a census town in the Pandabeswar CD block in the Durgapur subdivision of the Paschim Bardhaman district in the Indian state of West Bengal.

== Geography ==
Cities, towns and ECL Areas in the northern portion of Durgapur subdivision in Paschim Bardhaman district
MC: Municipal Corporation, CT: census town, R: rural administrative centre
Owing to space constraints in the small map, the actual locations in a larger map may vary slightly

=== Location ===
Mahal, Baidyanathpur, Dalurband, Ramnagar, Bilpahari and Kendra Khottamdi form a cluster of census towns in the northern portion of Pandabeswar CD block.

=== Urbanisation ===
According to the 2011 census, 79.22% of the population of the Durgapur subdivision was urban and 20.78% was rural. The Durgapur subdivision has 1 municipal corporation at Durgapur and 38 (+1 partly) census towns (partly presented in the map alongside; all places marked on the map are linked in the full-screen map).

== Demographics ==
According to the 2011 Census of India, Ramnagar had a total population of 5,446, of which 2,800 (51%) were males and 2,646 (49%) were females. Population in the age group 0–6 years was 647. The total number of literate persons in Ramnagar was 3,332 (69.43% of the population over 6 years).

*For language details see Pandabeswar (community development block)#Language and religion

As of 2001 India census, Ramnagar had a population of 4926. Males constitute 54% of the population and females 46%. Ramnagar has an average literacy rate of 59%, lower than the national average of 59.5%: male literacy is 69%, and female literacy is 46%. In Ramnagar, 12% of the population is under 6 years of age.

== Infrastructure ==
According to the District Census Handbook 2011, Bardhaman, Ramnagar covered an area of 5.94 km^{2}. Among the civic amenities, the protected water-supply involved service reservoir, tap water from treated sources, uncovered wells. It had 474 domestic electric connections. Among the medical facilities it had were 2 dispensaries/ health centres, 6 medicine shops. Among the educational facilities it had were 3 primary schools. Among the important commodities it produced were paddy, coal, earthen pots.

== Education ==
Ramnagar has one primary school.
