= Haripur, Paschim Bardhaman =

Haripur
- Census Town
- Location in West Bengal, India Haripur (India)
- Coordinates: 23.68336°N 87.197346°E
- Country: India
- State: West Bengal
- District: Paschim Bardhaman

Area
  - Total: 2.5 km^{2} (0.97 sq mi)
- Elevation: 14 m (46 ft)

Population (2011)
  - Total: 5,910
  - Density: 2,400/km^{2} (6,100/sq mi)

Languages*
  - Official: Bengali, Hindi, English
- Time zone: UTC+5:30 (IST)
- PIN: 713378
- Telephone/ STD code: 0341
- Vehicle registration: WB
- Lok Sabha constituency: Asansol
- Vidhan Sabha constituency: Pandaveswar
- Website: paschimbardhaman.co.in

Haripur is a census town in the Pandabeswar CD block in the Durgapur subdivision of the Paschim Bardhaman district in the Indian state of West Bengal.

== Geography ==
Cities, towns and ECL Areas in the northern portion of Durgapur subdivision in Paschim Bardhaman district
MC: Municipal Corporation, CT: census town, R: rural administrative centre
Owing to space constraints in the small map, the actual locations in a larger map may vary slightly

=== Location ===
Haripur is located at 23°41′00″N 87°11′50″E.

Tumni, a small stream, originates near Chichuria village in the area, flows parallel to the Ajay and joins it near Shyamarupagarh.

Konardihi, Nabgram, Chak Bankola, Sankarpur, Haripur, Bahula, Chhora and Parashkol form a cluster of census towns in the southern portion of Pandabeswar CD block.

=== Urbanisation ===
According to the 2011 census, 79.22% of the population of the Durgapur subdivision was urban and 20.78% was rural. The Durgapur subdivision has 1 municipal corporation at Durgapur and 38 (+1 partly) census towns (partly presented in the map alongside; all places marked on the map are linked in the full-screen map).

== Demographics ==
According to the 2011 Census of India, Haripur had a total population of 5,910, of which 3,107 (53%) were males and 2,803 (47%) were females. Population in the age range years was 703. The total number of literate persons in Haripur was 4,140 (79.51% of the population over 6 years).

*For language details see Pandabeswar (community development block)#Language and religion

As of 2001 India census, Haripur had a population of 6,888. Males constitute 54% of the population and females 46%. Haripur has an average literacy rate of 61%, higher than the national average of 59.5%: male literacy is 71%, and female literacy is 50%. In Haripur, 14% of the population is under 6 years of age. Even with such fewer inhabitants, the place boasts of a Petrol Pump and a nationalised bank.

== Infrastructure ==
According to the District Census Handbook 2011, Bardhaman, Haripur covered an area of 2.5 km^{2}. Among the civic amenities, the protected water-supply involved service reservoir, tap water from treated sources, uncovered wells. It had 492 domestic electric connections. Among the medical facilities it had were 1 dispensary/ health centre, 1 maternity/ child welfare centre, 1 nursing home, 1 charitable hospital/ nursing home, 3 medicine shops. Among the educational facilities it had were 6 primary schools, 1 middle school, the nearest secondary school, senior secondary school at Bahula 4 km away. Among the important commodities it produced were coal, paddy, mustard oil.

== Economy ==
It is in the heart of the coal mining zone.

As per the ECL website telephone numbers, operational collieries in the Kenda Area in 2018 are: Bahula Colliery, Chora Block Incline, CI Jambad Colliery, Chora OCP, Haripur Colliery, Lower Kenda Colliery, New Kenda Colliery, Siduli Colliery, SK OCP, West Kenda OCP.

== Transport ==
National Highway 14 (old number NH 60) passes through Haripur.

== Education ==
Haripur has three primary schools, one Urdu primary school and one Madhyamik Sikha Kendra (MSK).

== Healthcare ==
Medical facilities (hospital/ dispensary) in the Kenda Area of ECL are available at Chhora Regional Hospital (with 30 beds) (PO Bahula), New Kenda (PO New Kenda), Lower Kenda (PO Haripur), Bahula (PO Bahula), CI Jambad (PO Bahula), Siduli (PO Siduli), Haripur (PO Haripur), CBI (PO Haripur), Chora Group pits (PO Haripur).
