= Bilpahari =

- Census Town
- Location in West Bengal, India Bilpahari (India)
- Coordinates: 23.720769°N 87.234769°E
- Country: India
- State: West Bengal
- District: Paschim Bardhaman

Area
  - Total: 4.08 km^{2} (1.58 sq mi)

Population (2011)
  - Total: 8,565
  - Density: 2,100/km^{2} (5,440/sq mi)

Languages*
  - Official: Bengali, Hindi, English
- Time zone: UTC+5:30 (IST)
- PIN: 713378
- Telephone code/STD: 0341
- Vehicle registration: WB
- Lok Sabha constituency: Asansol
- Vidhan Sabha constituency: Pandaveswar
- Website: paschimbardhaman.co.in

Bilpahari is a census town in the Pandabeswar CD block in the Durgapur subdivision of the Paschim Bardhaman district in the state of West Bengal, India.

== Geography ==
Cities, towns and ECL Areas in the northern portion of Durgapur subdivision in Paschim Bardhaman district
MC: Municipal Corporation, CT: census town, R: rural administrative centre
Owing to space constraints in the small map, the actual locations in a larger map may vary slightly

=== Location ===
Mahal, Baidyanathpur, Dalurband, Ramnagar, Bilpahari and Kendra Khottamdi form a cluster of census towns in the northern portion of Pandabeswar CD block.

=== Urbanisation ===
According to the 2011 census, 79.22% of the population of the Durgapur subdivision was urban and 20.78% was rural. The Durgapur subdivision has 1 municipal corporation at Durgapur and 38 (+1 partly) census towns (partly presented in the map alongside; all places marked on the map are linked in the full-screen map).

== Demographics ==
According to the 2011 Census of India, Bilpahari had a total population of 8,565, of which 4,519 (53%) were males and 4,046 (47%) were females. Population in the age range 0–6 years was 1,038. The total number of literate persons in Bilpahari was 5,623 (74.70% of the population over 6 years).

*For language details see Pandabeswar (community development block)#Language and religion

As of 2001 India census, Bilpahari had a population of 7,786. Males constitute 55% of the population and females 45%. Bilpahari has an average literacy rate of 53%, lower than the national average of 59.5%; with male literacy of 62% and female literacy of 42%. 15% of the population is under 6 years of age.

== Infrastructure ==
According to the District Census Handbook 2011, Bardhaman, Bilpahari covered an area of 4.08 km^{2}. Among the civic amenities, the protected water-supply involved service reservoir, tap water from treated sources, uncovered wells. It had 740 domestic electric connections. Among the educational facilities it had were 5 primary schools, the nearest senior secondary school, at Kendra 3 km away. Among the important commodities it produced were paddy, coal, earthen pots.

== Economy ==
Collieries in the Pandaveswar Area of Eastern Coalfields are: Madaipur, Maderboni, Nutandanga, Pandaveswar, Dalurbandh, Kendra, Samla, South Samla, Khottadih, Kankartala, Dalurbandh OCP, Palasthali OCP and Gangaramchak OCP.

== Education ==
Bilpahari has one primary school.
