= Jitendra Tiwari =

Indian politician

- Jitendra Tiwari

Member of West Bengal Legislative Assembly
- Incumbent
- Assumed office 4 May 2026
- Preceded by: Narendranath Chakraborty
- Constituency: Pandaveswar

Mayor of Asansol
- In office 13 October 2015 – 17 December 2020
- Succeeded by: Tapas Banerjee

Personal details
- Born: January 10, 1974 (age 52) 3 No. Ghusik Colliery, Damra, Asansol, West Bengal, India
- Party: Bharatiya Janata Party (2021-present)
- Other political affiliations: All India Trinamool Congress (1998–2021)
- Spouse: Chaitali Tiwari
- Children: Pallabi Tiwari

Jitendra Kumar Tiwari is an Indian politician from West Bengal and a member of the Bharatiya Janata Party (BJP). He has been serving as a Member of the West Bengal Legislative Assembly from the Pandaveswar constituency since May 2026. He previously represented the same constituency from 2016 to 2021.

Tiwari served as the Mayor of Asansol from October 2015 to December 2020 and was also the president of the Trinamool Congress’s Paschim Bardhaman district unit. He joined the Bharatiya Janata Party in March 2021 and contested the 2021 West Bengal Legislative Assembly election from Pandaveswar. In the 2026 West Bengal Legislative Assembly election, he was elected from the Pandaveswar constituency on a BJP ticket, defeating All India Trinamool Congress (TMC) candidate Narendranath Chakraborty by a margin of 1,398 votes.

== Early life ==
Jitendra Tiwari was born at 3 No. Ghusik Colliery in Damra, Asansol, West Bengal, to his late father, Sadhu Saran Tiwari, an employee of Eastern Coalfields Limited (ECL), and his mother, Nawal Kishori Devi. He completed his Bachelor of Commerce (B.Com) degree from B.B. College in Asansol and also studied law, earning a Bachelor of Laws (LL.B) degree. By profession, he is a lawyer.

== Controversies ==
Tiwari has been in numerous controversies due to his acts and activism in political activities.

- On 13 December 2020, Tiwari wrote a letter to the Minister of Urban Development and Municipal Affairs Firhad Hakim, accusing the Mamata Banerjee-led government of doing injustice to the city of Asansol by depriving the city from central government schemes.
- On 17 December 2020, Tiwari left the Trinamool Congress and resigned from the post of chairman and administrator of Asansol Municipal Corporation.

== Political career ==
=== Early political career and student politics (1993–1998) ===
Jitendra Tiwari began his political career in 1993 through student politics at B.B. College in Asansol, West Bengal. During his college years, he was associated with the Chhatra Parishad, the student wing of the Indian National Congress. His involvement in student politics marked the beginning of his participation in public and political activities in the Asansol region.

In 1998, Tiwari joined the All India Trinamool Congress (AITC), founded by Mamata Banerjee. Following his entry into the party, he became actively involved in its organisational activities and youth politics in the Asansol region. He subsequently served as the President of the Trinamool Youth Congress in the Asansol Rural Block, where he worked on strengthening the party’s grassroots organisation and youth network.

=== Electoral debut and municipal politics (2006–2015) ===
In the 2006 West Bengal Legislative Assembly election, Tiwari contested from the Raniganj Assembly constituency as a candidate of the All India Trinamool Congress. This was his first contest in a West Bengal Legislative Assembly election, although he was unsuccessful.

In 2009, he entered municipal politics and became a councillor representing the Mohishila area. He also served as the Chairman of the erstwhile Asansol Municipality, taking on responsibilities in local civic administration. His involvement in municipal governance contributed to his growing role in the political and administrative affairs of the Asansol region.

=== Mayor of Asansol and election to the Legislative Assembly (2015–2016) ===
On 13 October 2015, Jitendra Tiwari became the Mayor of the Asansol Municipal Corporation. He headed the municipal administration and was responsible for overseeing civic governance and municipal services in the city.

In the 2016 West Bengal Legislative Assembly election, Tiwari contested from the Pandaveswar Assembly constituency on an All India Trinamool Congress ticket. He won the election and was elected as a Member of the West Bengal Legislative Assembly (MLA) for the first time.

=== Legislative tenure and institutional responsibilities (2016–2021) ===
During his tenure as the MLA representing Pandaveswar from 2016 to 2021, Tiwari held several additional institutional, educational and administrative positions in West Bengal.

His responsibilities during this period included:

- President, Governing Body, Raniganj Girls’ College: He served as the President of the college’s Governing Body, participating in institutional governance and administration.
- President, Governing Body, Triveni Devi Bhalotia College (TDB College): He served as the President of the college’s Governing Body, overseeing institutional and administrative matters.
- Chairman, District Integrated Child Development Services (ICDS) Committee: He held the position of Chairman of the district-level ICDS committee, which is associated with the implementation and monitoring of child development, nutrition and related welfare programmes.
- Member, West Bengal State Urban Development Authority: He served as a member of the state-level authority associated with urban development and planning.

Alongside these institutional responsibilities, Tiwari continued his political and organisational activities within the Trinamool Congress.

Following the 2019 Indian general election, he was appointed President of the All India Trinamool Congress’s Paschim Bardhaman district unit. As district president, he was responsible for overseeing the party’s organisational structure and political activities across Paschim Bardhaman district.

He continued to represent Pandaveswar in the West Bengal Legislative Assembly until the 2021 Assembly election.

=== Resignation from the Trinamool Congress (December 2020) ===
In December 2020, differences emerged between Tiwari and the Trinamool Congress leadership over organisational and administrative matters.

On 17 December 2020, he resigned from his position as Chairman of the Board of Administrators of the Asansol Municipal Corporation and relinquished his organisational responsibilities within the Trinamool Congress. He initially continued as the MLA from Pandaveswar.

Following his resignation, Tiwari briefly returned to the Trinamool Congress after discussions with the party leadership. However, he subsequently decided to leave the party and join the Bharatiya Janata Party.

=== Joining the Bharatiya Janata Party (2021) ===
On 2 March 2021, Jitendra Tiwari formally joined the Bharatiya Janata Party (BJP) in the presence of the then BJP West Bengal state president, Dilip Ghosh.

Following his induction into the BJP, he became a member of the BJP West Bengal State Executive Committee. He was also entrusted with organisational responsibilities as the party’s in-charge of Birbhum district.

In the 2021 West Bengal Legislative Assembly election, the BJP nominated Tiwari as its candidate from the Pandaveswar Assembly constituency. He contested against All India Trinamool Congress candidate Narendranath Chakraborty but lost the election.

Following the election, Tiwari continued his political and organisational activities as a BJP leader in West Bengal and remained associated with the party’s state-level organisational structure.

=== Arrest and judicial proceedings (2023) ===
In March 2023, Jitendra Tiwari was arrested and subsequently spent 22 days in judicial custody. On 10 April 2023, the Calcutta High Court granted him conditional bail. While granting bail, the High Court observed that further custodial interrogation was not necessary and that his continued detention was unwarranted. He was subsequently released from custody.

=== Return to the West Bengal Legislative Assembly (2026) ===
In the 2026 West Bengal Legislative Assembly election, the Bharatiya Janata Party again nominated Jitendra Tiwari from the Pandaveswar Assembly constituency.

He contested against the sitting MLA and All India Trinamool Congress candidate Narendranath Chakraborty. Tiwari won the election, securing 80,501 votes, while Chakraborty received 79,103 votes. Tiwari won by a margin of 1,398 votes.

With this victory, Tiwari returned to the West Bengal Legislative Assembly for a second term as the MLA representing Pandaveswar. His election in 2026 marked his return to the state legislature after a five-year gap, having previously represented the same constituency from 2016 to 2021 as a member of the Trinamool Congress.

He currently represents Pandaveswar in the West Bengal Legislative Assembly as a member of the Bharatiya Janata Party.

== Social media ==
- Official Facebook page
- Official Instagram profile
- Official X account
- Official Threads profile
- Official YouTube channel
