= Pandabeswar (community development block) =

- Community development block
- Location in West Bengal
- Coordinates: 23°43′00″N 87°17′00″E
- Country: India
- State: West Bengal
- District: Paschim Bardhaman
- Parliamentary constituency: Asansol
- Assembly constituency: Pandaveswar

Area
  - Total: 37.76 sq mi (97.80 km^{2})
- Elevation: 285 ft (87 m)

Population (2011)
  - Total: 161,891
  - Density: 4,287/sq mi (1,655/km^{2})
- Time zone: UTC+5.30 (IST)
- PIN: 713346 (Pandaveshwar); 713380 (Kendra); 713378 (Haripur); 713322 (Bahula)
- Telephone/STD code: 0341
- Vehicle registration: WB-39,WB-40
- Literacy Rate: 73.01 per cent
- Website: http://bardhaman.gov.in/

Pandabeswar is a community development block that forms an administrative division in Durgapur subdivision of Paschim Bardhaman district in the Indian state of West Bengal.

== History ==
During World War II there was an American airbase at Pandabeswar.

== Geography ==
Pandabeswar is located at 23°43′N 87°17′E.

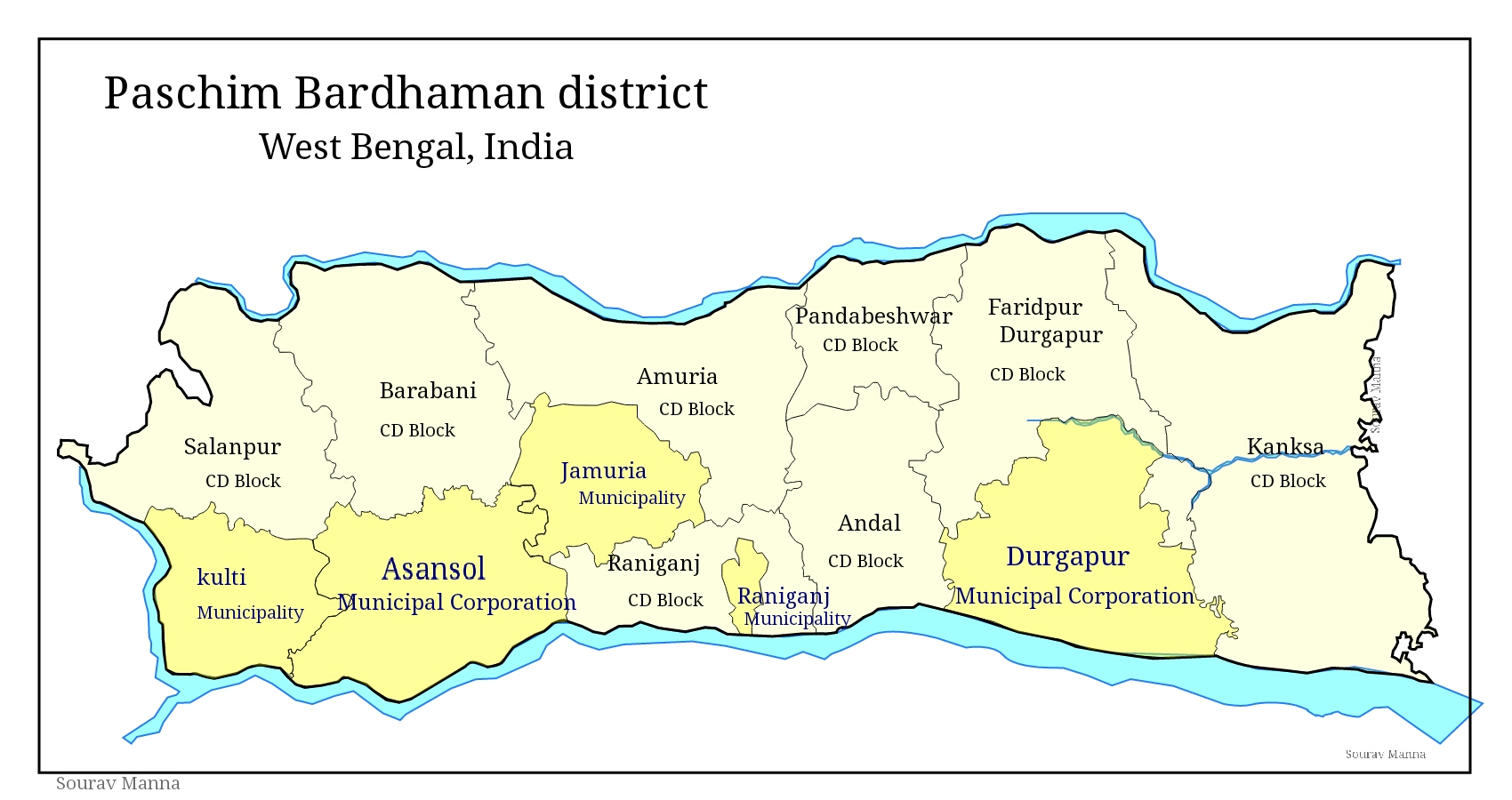
Map of Paschim Bardhaman district

Pandabeswar CD Block is part of the Ajay Damodar Barakar tract. This area is sort of an extension of the Chota Nagpur Plateau. It is a rocky undulating area with laterite soil, with the Ajay on the north, the Damodar on the south and the Barakar on the west. For ages the area was heavily forested and infested with plunderers and marauders. The discovery of coal, in the eighteenth century, led to industrialisation of the area and most of the forests have been cleared.

Pandabeswar CD Block is bounded by Dubrajpur CD Block, in Birbhum district, on the north, Faridpur Durgapur CD Block on the east, Andal CD Block on the south and Jamuria CD Block on the west.

Pandabeswar CD Block has an area of 97.80 km^{2}. It has 1 panchayat samity, 6 gram panchayats, 112 gram sansads (village councils), 17 mouzas and 14 inhabited villages. Pandabeswar police station serve this block. Headquarters of this CD Block is at Pandabeswar.

Gram panchayats of Pandabeswar block/panchayat samiti are: Bahula, Baidyanathpur, Chhora, Haripur, Kendra and Nabagram.

== Demographics ==
=== Population ===
As per the 2011 Census of India Pandabeswar CD Block had a total population of 161,891, of which 26,720 were rural and 135,171 were urban. There were 84,651 (52%) males and 77,240 (48%) females. Population below 6 years was 19,709. Scheduled Castes numbered 49,189 (30.38%) and Scheduled Tribes numbered 10,821 (6.68%).

As per 2001 census, Pandabeswar block had a total population of 146,445, out of which 79,992 were males and 66,453 were females. Pandabeswar block registered a population growth of 9.37 per cent during the 1991-2001 decade. Decadal growth for Bardhaman district was 14.36 per cent. Decadal growth in West Bengal was 17.84 per cent. Scheduled castes at 55,511 formed around one-third the population. Scheduled tribes numbered 14,508.

Census Towns in Pandabeswar CD Block are (2011 census figures in brackets): Chak Bankola (part) (11,527), Parashkol (part) (10,367), Kendra Khottamdi (part) (6,875), Bilpahari (8,565), Ramnagar (5,446), Dalurband (15,107), Baidyanathpur (15,704), Mahal (4,841), Konardihi (8,488), Nabgram (4,626), Sankarpur (6,399), Haripur (5,910), Chhora(13,806) and Bahula (17,510). Chak Bankola and Parashkol are partly in Andal CD Block and partly in Pandabeswar CD Block. Kendra Khottamdi is partly in Jamuria CD Block and partly in Pandabeswar CD Block.

Pandabeswar is shown as part of Baidyanathpur in the map of Pandabeswar CD Block on page 243 of the District Census Handbook, Bardhaman, 2011.

Villages in Pandabeswar CD Block are (2011census figures in brackets): Banbahal (3,540), Gobindapur (1,898), Konda (916), Deshlopa (1,178), Danya (3,854), Chak Karala (1,331), Joalbhanga (2,070), Bhatmura (594), Chak Jharia (1,497), Shyamsundarpur (2,801), Bhaluka (681), Sonpur (2,358), Bajari (1,583) and Kumarkhala (2,419).(All villages included in 2011 census data are mentioned here. Other villages or localities, if any, are parts of these villages.)

=== Literacy ===
As per the 2011 census the total number of literates in Pandabeswar CD Block was 103,801 (73.01% of the population over 6 years) out of which males numbered 61,005 (81.82% of the male population over 6 years) and females numbered 42,796 (63.28% of the female population over 6 years). The gender disparity (the difference between female and male literacy rates) was 18.54%.

As per 2001 census, Pandabeswar block had a total literacy of 63.73 per cent for the 6+ age group. While male literacy was 73.56 per cent female literacy was 51.65 per cent. Bardhaman district had a total literacy of 70.18 per cent, male literacy being 78.63 per cent and female literacy being 60.95 per cent.

See also – List of West Bengal districts ranked by literacy rate

Literacy in CD blocks of
Bardhaman district
Bardhaman Sadar North subdivision
Ausgram I – 69.39%
Ausgram II – 68.00%
Bhatar – 71.56%
Burdwan I – 76.07%
Burdwan II – 74.12%
Galsi II – 70.05%
Bardhaman Sadar South subdivision
Khandaghosh – 77.28%
Raina I – 80.20%
Raina II – 81.48%
Jamalpur – 74.08%
Memari I – 74.10%
Memari II – 74.59%
Kalna subdivision
Kalna I – 75.81%
Kalna II – 76.25%
Manteswar – 73.08%
Purbasthali I – 77.59%
Purbasthali II – 70.35%
Katwa subdivision
Katwa I – 70.36%
Katwa II – 69.16%
Ketugram I – 68.00%
Ketugram II – 65.96%
Mongalkote – 67.97%
Durgapur subdivision
Andal – 77.25%
Faridpur Durgapur – 74.14%
Galsi I – 72.81%
Kanksa – 76.34%
Pandabeswar – 73.01%
Asansol subdivision
Barabani – 69.58%
Jamuria – 69.42%
Raniganj – 73.86%
Salanpur – 78.76%
2011 Census: CD Block Wise

Primary Census Abstract Data

=== Language and religion ===
Religion in Pandabeswar CD block (2011)
Hinduism	86.36%
Islam	12.59%
Sikhism	0.53%
Other or not stated	0.52%

In the 2011 census Hindus numbered 139,805 and formed 86.36% of the population in Pandabeswar CD Block. Muslims numbered 20,377 and formed 12.59% of the population. Christians numbered 232 and formed 0.14% of the population. Others numbered 1,477 and formed 0.91% of the population.

Languages of Pandabeswar CD block (2011)
1. Bengali (47.7%)
2. Hindi (40.8%)
3. Santali (4.52%)
4. Odia (1.60%)
5. Urdu (1.17%)
6. Others (4.22%)

At the time of the 2011 census, 47.67% of the population spoke Bengali, 40.82% Hindi, 4.52% Santali, 1.60% Odia and 1.17% Urdu as their first language.

== Rural poverty ==
As per poverty estimates obtained from household survey for families living below poverty line in 2005, rural poverty in Pandabeswar CD Block was 20.59%.

== Economy ==
=== Livelihood ===
Livelihood
in Pandabeswar CD Block
1. Cultivators (2.81%)
2. Agricultural labourers (7.52%)
3. Household industries (3.31%)
4. Other Workers (86.4%)

In Pandabeswar CD Block in 2011, amongst the class of total workers, cultivators numbered 1,401 and formed 2.81% of the total workers, agricultural labourers numbered 3,747 and formed 7.52%, household industry workers numbered 1,650 and formed 3.31% and other workers numbered 43,052 and formed 86.36%. Total workers numbered 49,850 and formed 30.79% of the total population, and non-workers numbered 112,041 and formed 69.21% of the population.

Coalmines are spread across the Andal, Pandaveswar, Raniganj, Jamuria, Barabani and Salanpur region, including municipal areas. Livelihood in this region is coal-centred. The area does not produce much of agricultural products. Overall work participation rate, and female work participation rate, in the mining area are low. Interestingly the work participation rate in the predominantly agricultural rural areas of erstwhile Bardhaman district is higher than in the predominantly urbanised mining area. Human development in the mining area does not at all look good. However, in the composite livelihood index the mining area performs much better than the non-mining areas of erstwhile Bardhaman district. The decadal (1991-2001) change in composition of workers shows the growing pressure of population growth, as well as of migrants from adjacent Jharkhand.

Note: In the census records a person is considered a cultivator, if the person is engaged in cultivation/ supervision of land owned by self/government/institution. When a person who works on another person's land for wages in cash or kind or share, is regarded as an agricultural labourer. Household industry is defined as an industry conducted by one or more members of the family within the household or village, and one that does not qualify for registration as a factory under the Factories Act. Other workers are persons engaged in some economic activity other than cultivators, agricultural labourers and household workers. It includes factory, mining, plantation, transport and office workers, those engaged in business and commerce, teachers, entertainment artistes and so on.

=== Infrastructure ===
All 17 or 100% of mouzas in Pandabeswar CD Block were electrified by 31 March 2014.

All 17 mouzas in Pandabeswar CD Block had drinking water facilities in 2013-14. There were 61 fair price shops in the CD Block.

=== Coal mining ===
Sonpur Bazari Open Cast Project of Eastern Coalfields was approved in 1995. The targeted output in 2016-17 was 8 million tonnes. Mineable reserve as on 1/4/2015 was 179.60 million tonnes. Balance life of the project as on 1/4/2012 was 23 years.

Madhaipur open cast project in Pandabeshwar Area of Eastern Coalfields has a mineable reserve of 13.15 million tonnes.

Amongst the mines of Eastern Coalfields selected for introduction of mass production technology with the installation of the continuous miner are: Kumardihi (1.02 million tonnes per year) and Khottamdi (1.0 mty).

See also – Pandaveswar Area, Bankola Area, Kenda Area, all of Eastern Coalfields, Sonpur Bazari and Jhanjra

=== Agriculture ===
Although the Bargadari Act of 1950 recognised the rights of bargadars to a higher share of crops from the land that they tilled, it was not implemented fully. Large tracts, beyond the prescribed limit of land ceiling, remained with the rich landlords. From 1977 onwards major land reforms took place in West Bengal. Land in excess of land ceiling was acquired and distributed amongst the peasants. Following land reforms land ownership pattern has undergone transformation. In 2013-14, persons engaged in agriculture in Pandabeswar CD Block could be classified as follows: bargadars 3.65%, patta (document) holders 24.82%, small farmers (possessing land between 1 and 2 hectares) 5.72%, marginal farmers (possessing land up to 1 hectare) 37.32% and agricultural labourers 28.49%.

In 2003-04 net cropped area in Pandabeswar CD Block was 3,156 hectares.

In 2013-14, Pandabeswar CD Block produced 6,253 tonnes of Aman paddy, the main winter crop, from 2,005 hectares and 28 tonnes of wheat from 10 hectares. It also produced pulses and oilseeds.

=== Banking ===
In 2013-14, Pandabeswar CD Block had offices of 9 commercial banks.

== Transport ==
Pandabeswar CD Block has 3 originating/ terminating bus routes.

The Andal-Sainthia branch line passes through this CD Block and the main station is Pandabeswar railway station.

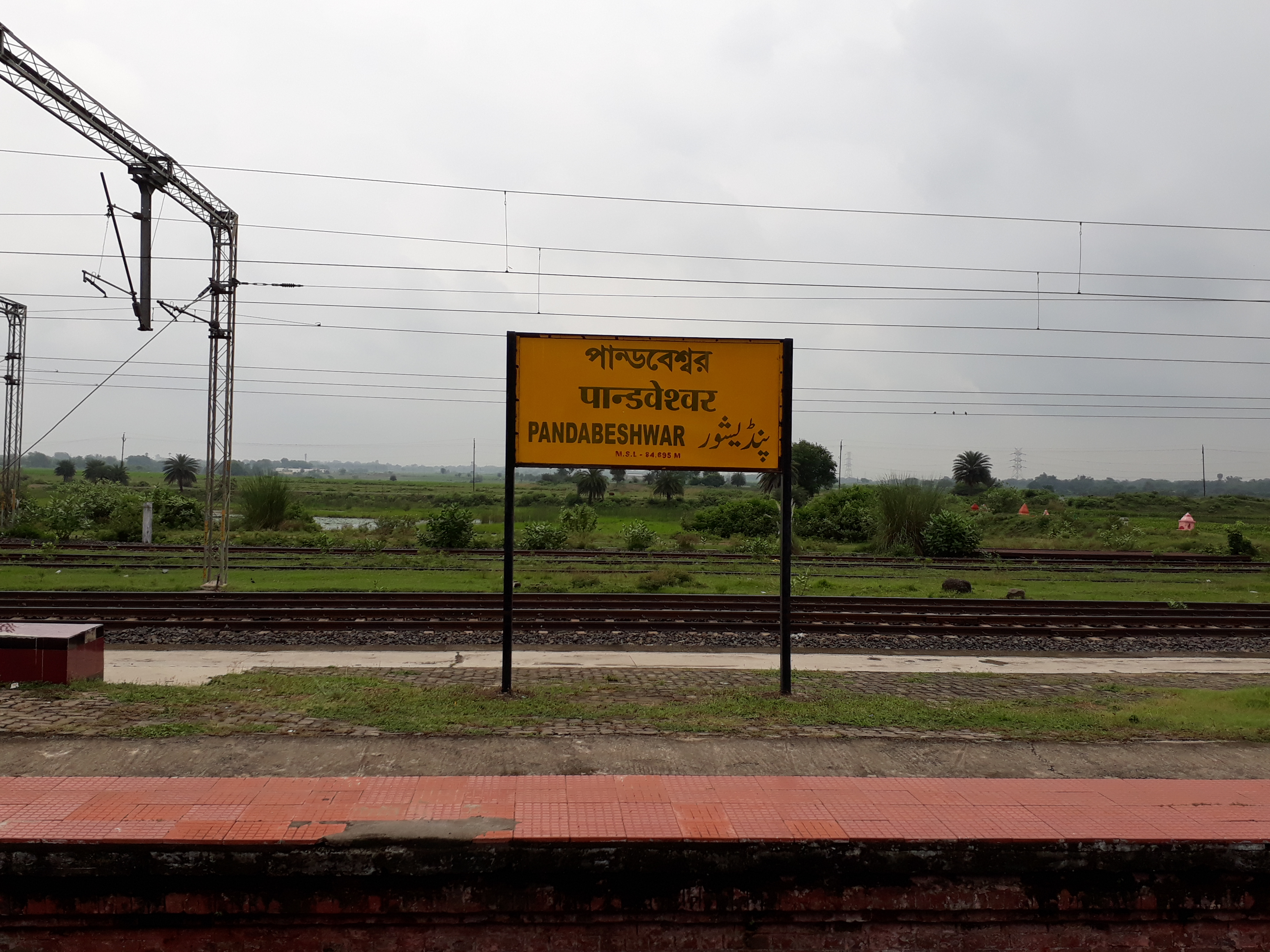
Pandabeswar Railway Station

NH 14 (old number NH 60) pass through this CD Block.

== Education ==
In 2013-14, Pandabeswar CD Block had 44 primary schools with 6,666 students, 7 middle schools with 737 students, 2 high school with 812 students and 5 higher secondary schools with 9,009 students. Pandabeswar CD Block had 1 general college with 1,007 students, 257 institutions for special and non-formal education with 9,690 students

Pandaveswar College was established at Pandabeswar in 2005. It is affiliated with Kazi Nazrul University.

== Healthcare ==
In 2014, Pandabeswar CD Block had 1 primary health centre and 1 private nursing home with total 6 beds and 1 doctor (excluding private bodies). 6 patients were treated indoor and 141,410 patients were treated outdoor in the hospitals, health centres and subcentres of the CD Block.

Pandabeswar Block Primary Health Centre, Pandabeswar CD block, with 10 beds, at Pandabeswar, is the major government medical facility in the Pandaveswar CD block. The 750-bed Mandabani Hospital of Eastern Coalfields is located at Panthnagar.
