= Kenda =

- Census Town
- Location in West Bengal, India Kenda (India)
- Coordinates: 23.6773°N 87.1693°E
- Country: India
- State: West Bengal
- District: Paschim Bardhaman

Area
  - Total: 7.95 km^{2} (3.07 sq mi)
- Elevation: 229 m (751 ft)

Population (2011)
  - Total: 15,731
  - Density: 1,980/km^{2} (5,120/sq mi)

Languages*
  - Official: Bengali, Hindi, English
- Time zone: UTC+5:30 (IST)
- Vehicle registration: WB
- Lok Sabha constituency: Asansol
- Vidhan Sabha constituency: Jamuria
- Website: bardhaman.gov.in

Kenda is a census town in the Jamuria CD block in the Asansol Sadar subdivision in the Paschim Bardhaman district in the Indian state of West Bengal.

== Geography ==
Cities and towns in the eastern portion of Asansol Sadar subdivision in Paschim Bardhaman district
MC: Municipal Corporation, CT: census town, N: neighbourhood, R: rural centre
Owing to space constraints in the small map, the actual locations in a larger map may vary slightly

=== Location ===
Kenda is located at 23.6773°N 87.1693°E. It has an average elevation of 229 m (751 ft). The Asansol region is composed of undulating laterite soil. This area lies between two rivers – the Damodar and the Ajay. They flow almost parallel to each other in the region – the average distance between the two rivers is around 30 km. For ages the area was heavily forested and infested with plunderers and marauders. The discovery of coal led to industrialisation of the area and most of the forests have been cleared.

=== Urbanisation ===
According to the 2011 census, 83.33% of the population of Asansol Sadar subdivision was urban and 16.67% was rural. In 2015, the municipal areas of Kulti, Raniganj and Jamuria were included within the jurisdiction of Asansol Municipal Corporation. Asansol Sadar subdivision has 26 (+1 partly) Census Towns.(partly presented in the map alongside; all places marked on the map are linked in the full-screen map).

== Demographics ==
According to the 2011 Census of India, Kenda had a total population of 15,731 of which 8,360 (53%) were males and 7,371 (47%) were females. Population in the age range 0–6 years was 1,811. The total number of literate persons in Kenda was 10,316 (74.11% of the population over 6 years).

*For language details see Jamuria (community development block)#Language and religion

As of 2001 India census, Kenda had a population of 14,517. Males constitute 55% of the population and females 45%. Kenda has an average literacy rate of 62%, higher than the national average of 59.5%: male literacy is 71%, and female literacy is 51%. In Kenda, 13% of the population is under 6 years of age.

== Infrastructure ==
According to the District Census Handbook 2011, Bardhaman, Kenda covered an area of 7.95 km^{2}. Among the civic amenities, it had 7.5 km roads, the protected water supply involved service reservoir, tap water from treated and untreated sources. It had 820 domestic electric connections. Among the medical facilities, the nearest dispensary/ health centre was 1 km away. Among the educational facilities it had were 7 primary schools, 1 secondary school, 1 senior secondary school, the nearest general degree college at Raniganj 15 km away. Among the important commodities it manufactured.

== Economy ==
Kenda is a coal mining area. One of the area headquarters of Eastern Coalfields Ltd., a subsidiary of Coal India Limited are located here. Underground mining has been hazardous activity leading to accidents. 55 persons were killed in an accident in the New Kenda Colliery in 1994.

Another six persons died in an accident in Shyamsunderpur colliery in 2006. The coal mining area also faces land subsidence problems.

As per ECL website telephone numbers, operational collieries in the Kenda Area of Eastern Coalfields in 2018 are: Bahula Colliery, Chora Block Incline, CI Jambad Colliery, Chora OCP, Haripur Colliery, Lower Kenda Colliery, New Kenda Colliery, Siduli Colliery, SK OCP, West Kenda OCP.

== Education ==
Kenda has three primary and one higher secondary schools.

Kenda High School is a Bengali-medium coeducational institution established in 1935. It has facilities for teaching from class V to class XII. The school has 7 computers and a library with 100 books.

Kenda Hindi Junior High School is a Hindi-medium coeducational institution established in 2009. It has facilities for teaching from class V to class VIII. It has a library with 116 books and a playground.

== Healthcare ==
Medical facilities in the Kenda Area of ECL are available at Chhora Regional Hospital (with 30 beds) (PO Bahula), New Kenda (PO New Kenda), Lower Kenda (PO Haripur), Bahula (PO Bahula), CL Jambad (PO Bahula), Siduli (PO Siduli), Haripur (PO Haripur), CBI (PO Haripur), Chora Group pits (PO Haripur) ).
