= Chhatrish Ganda =

Chhatrish Ganda 36 Ganda, 36 Gonda, Chhatrish Gonda
- Village
- Location in West Bengal, India Chhatrish Ganda (India)
- Coordinates: 23.736944°N 87.218611°E
- Country: India
- State: West Bengal
- District: Paschim Bardhaman
- Elevation: 14 m (46 ft)

Population (2011)
  - Total: 2,951

Languages
  - Official: Bengali, English, Hindi
- Time zone: UTC+5:30 (IST)
- PIN: 713346
- Telephone code: +91 341
- ISO 3166 code: IN-WB
- Lok Sabha constituency: Asansol
- Vidhan Sabha constituency: Jamuria
- Website: bardhaman.gov.in

Chhatrish Ganda is a small village under Jamuria block of Asansol subdivision in Paschim Bardhaman district in the state of West Bengal, India. It is a suburb of Asansol.

== Geography ==
The village is near Pandaveswar surrounded by "Open Cast Coal Mines". It is located in Paschim Bardhaman district, in the State of West Bengal, India. Chhatrish Ganda is located on the south bank of Ajay River.This area lies between two mighty rivers – the Damodar and the Ajay. They flow almost parallel to each other in the region. For ages the area was heavily forested and infested with plunderers and marauders.

== Economy ==
Chhatrish Ganda is situated in the heart of Raniganj Coalfield, one of India's coal mining areas.

== Demographics ==
As per 2011 census Chhatrish Ganda had a total population of 2951, of which 1547 are men and the female population comprises 1404.

== Education ==
Chhatrish Ganda village has lower literacy rate compared to West Bengal. In 2011, literacy rate of Chhatrish Ganda village was 66.97% compared to 76.26% of West Bengal. In Chhatrish Ganda Male literacy stands at 77.51% while female literacy rate was 55.73%.

Here are two Primary Schools one Bengali and one Hindi. There is two high schools also, one is Pandaveswar Sree Jaipuria High School which is situated in Kendra village is about 2 km east of Chhatrish Ganda and another is Nimsha Khottadih Alinagar High School which is situated in Khottadih village is about 4 km south of Chhatrish Ganda.

== Transport ==
There are two minibus routes serving Chhatrish Ganda - one Chhatrish Ganda to Raniganj via Pandaveswar and other from Chhatrish Ganda to Raniganj via Khottadih gram. Chhatrish Ganda is also connected to Pandaveswar through trekker services.

== About ==
Since India gained independence in 1947, agriculture and related industries have formed the primary economic base of Chhatrish Ganda. The village's population is composed of diverse casts and religious communities, reflecting the broader national concept of "unity in diversity." Local life and the village economy remain closely tied to agricultural practices.

India is the country of villages; people of this nation majorly reside in the interior part of it that mainly comprises villages or rural human settlements, it is estimated that about 68.84% of the Indian population stays in villages. These human settlements are often large in area with Eco-friendly habitat contributing to the simple lifestyle led by the inhabitants.
