= Sankarpur, Paschim Bardhaman =

Sankarpur
- Census Town
- Location in West Bengal, India Sankarpur (India)
- Coordinates: 23°40′04.8″N 87°13′44.4″E
- Country: India
- State: West Bengal
- District: Paschim Bardhaman

Area
  - Total: 3.31 km^{2} (1.28 sq mi)

Population (2011)
  - Total: 6,399
  - Density: 1,930/km^{2} (5,010/sq mi)

Languages*
  - Official: Bengali, Hindi, English
- Time zone: UTC+5:30 (IST)
- PIN: 713363
- Telephone/STD code: 0341
- Vehicle registration: WB
- Lok Sabha constituency: Asansol
- Vidhan Sabha constituency: Pandaveswar
- Website: paschimbardhaman.co.in

Sankarpur is a census town in the Pandabeswar CD block in the Durgapur subdivision of the Paschim Bardhaman district in the Indian state of West Bengal.

== Geography ==
Cities, towns and ECL Areas in the northern portion of Durgapur subdivision in Paschim Bardhaman district
MC: Municipal Corporation, CT: census town, R: rural administrative centre
Owing to space constraints in the small map, the actual locations in a larger map may vary slightly

=== Location ===
Konardihi, Nabgram, Chak Bankola, Sankarpur, Haripur, Bahula, Chhora and Parashkol form a cluster of census towns in the southern portion of Pandabeswar CD Block.

=== Urbanisation ===
According to the 2011 census, 79.22% of the population of the Durgapur subdivision was urban and 20.78% was rural. The Durgapur subdivision has 1 municipal corporation at Durgapur and 38 (+1 partly) census towns (partly presented in the map alongside; all places marked on the map are linked in the full-screen map).

== Demographics ==
According to the 2011 Census of India, Sankarpur had a total population of 6,399, of which 3,317 (52%) were males and 3,082 (48%) were females. Population in the age range 0–6 years was 822. The total number of literate persons in Sankarpur was 4,271 (76.58% of the population over 6 years).

*For language details see Pandabeswar (community development block)#Language and religion

As of 2001 India census, Sankarpur had a population of 5921. Males constitute 53% of the population and females 47%. Sankarpur has an average literacy rate of 60%, higher than the national average of 59.5%: male literacy is 68%, and female literacy is 51%. In Sankarpur, 13% of the population is under 6 years of age.

== Infrastructure ==
According to the District Census Handbook 2011, Bardhaman, Sankarpur covered an area of 3.31 km^{2}. Among the civic amenities, the protected water-supply involved service reservoir, tap water from treated sources, uncovered wells. It had 568 domestic electric connections. Among the medical facilities it had were 1 dispensary/ health centre, 1 maternity/ child welfare centre, charitable hospital/ nursing home, 3 medicine shops. Among the educational facilities it had were 2 primary schools, 1 middle school, 1 secondary school, the nearest senior secondary school at Ukhra 2 km away.

== Economy ==
According to the ECL website telephone numbers, operational collieries in the Bankola Area of Eastern Coalfields in 2018 are: Bankola Colliery, Khandra Colliery, Kumardih A Colliery, Kumardih B Colliery, Moira Colliery, Nakrakonda Colliery, Shankarpur Colliery, Shyamsundarpur Colliery and Tilaboni Colliery.

== Education ==
Sankarpur has two primary and one higher secondary schools.

== Healthcare ==
Medical facilities (periodic medical examination centres and dispensaries) in the Bankola Area of ECL are available at Bankola Area PME Centre (with 30 beds + 2 cabins) (PO Ukhra), Khandra (PO Khandra), Bankola Colliery (PO Khandra), Bankola Area (PO Khandra), Shyamsundarpur (PO Khandra), Mahira (PO Moira), Tilaboni (PO Pandabeswar), Nakrakonda (PO Pandabeswar), Shankarpur (PO Sheetalpur), Kumardihi A (PO Pandabeswar), Kumardihi B (PO Pandabeswar).
