= Parasia =

- Census Town
- Location in West Bengal, India Parasia (India)
- Coordinates: 23.65°N 87.16°E
- Country: India
- State: West Bengal
- District: Paschim Bardhaman

Population (2011)
  - Total: 8,894

Languages*
  - Official: Bengali, Hindi, English
- Time zone: UTC+5:30 (IST)
- ISO 3166 code: IN-WB
- Vehicle registration: WB
- Website: wb.gov.in

Parasia is a census town in the Jamuria CD block in Asansol Sadar subdivision of Paschim Bardhaman district in the Indian state of West Bengal.

== Geography ==
Cities and towns in the eastern portion of Asansol Sadar subdivision in Paschim Bardhaman district
MC: Municipal Corporation, CT: census town, N: neighbourhood, R: rural centre
Owing to space constraints in the small map, the actual locations in a larger map may vary slightly

== Location ==
Parasia is at 23.65°N 87.16°E.

== Urbanisation ==
According to the 2011 census, 83.33% of the population of Asansol Sadar subdivision was urban and 16.67% was rural. In 2015, the municipal areas of Kulti, Raniganj and Jamuria were included within the jurisdiction of Asansol Municipal Corporation. Asansol Sadar subdivision has 26 (+1 partly) Census Towns.(partly presented in the map alongside; all places marked on the map are linked in the full-screen map).

== Demographics ==
According to the 2011 Census of India, Parasia had a total population of 8,894 of which 4,794 (54%) were males and 4,100 (46%) were females. Population in the age range 0–6 years was 1,194. The total number of literate persons in Parasia was 5,146 (66.83% of the population over 6 years).

*For language details see Jamuria (community development block)#Language and religion

As of 2001 India census, Parasia had a population of 8684. Males constitute 56% of the population and females 44%. Parasia has an average literacy rate of 55%, lower than the national average of 59.5%: male literacy is 65%, and female literacy is 42%. In Parasia, 14% of the population is under 6 years of age.

== Infrastructure ==
According to the District Census Handbook 2011, Bardhaman, Parasia covered an area of 4.49 km^{2}. Among the civic amenities, it had 4 km roads, the protected water supply involved service reservoir, tap water from untreated sources. It had 729 domestic electric connections. Among the educational facilities it had were 3 primary schools, 1 secondary school, the nearest senior senior secondary school at Bhola 5 km away, the nearest general degree college at Raniganj 10 km away. Among the important commodities it manufactured were carpentry, bricks, cement. It had the branch offices of 1 nationalised bank.

== Economy ==
As per ECL website telephone numbers, operational collieries in the Kunustoria Area of Eastern Coalfields in 2018 are: Amritnagar Colliery, Amrasota Colliery, Bansra Colliery, Belbaid Colliery, Kunustoria Colliery, Mahabir OCP, North Searsole Colliery, Parasea Colliery, Parasea 6 & 7 Incline and Parasea OCP.

== Healthcare ==
Medical facilities in the Kunustoria Area of ECL are available at Kunstoria Area Hospital (with 50 beds) (Banshra), Parasea Colliery (PO Parasea), Belbaid Colliery (PO Parasea), Kunustoria Colliery (PO Toposi), North Searsole Colliery (PO Bijpur), Bansra Colliery (PO Banshra), Amritnagar Colliery (PO Raniganj), Mahabir Colliery (PO Raniganj).
