= Bahadurpur, Paschim Bardhaman =

Bahadurpur
- Village
- Location in West Bengal, India Bahadurpur (India)
- Coordinates: 23°41′30.5″N 87°08′17.9″E
- Country: India
- State: West Bengal
- District: Paschim Bardhaman

Population (2011)
  - Total: 2,514

Languages*
  - Official: Bengali, Hindi, English
- Time zone: UTC+5:30 (IST)
- Telephone/STD code: 0341
- Lok Sabha constituency: Asansol
- Vidhan Sabha constituency: Jamuria
- Website: bardhaman.gov.in

Bahadurpur is a village, in the Jamuria CD block in the Asansol subdivision of the Paschim Bardhaman district in the state of West Bengal, India.

== Geography ==
Cities and towns in the eastern portion of Asansol Sadar subdivision in Paschim Bardhaman district
MC: Municipal Corporation, CT: census town, N: neighbourhood, R: rural centre
Owing to space constraints in the small map, the actual locations in a larger map may vary slightly

=== Location ===
Bahadurpur is located at 23°41′30.5″N 87°08′17.9″E.

=== Urbanisation ===
According to the 2011 census, 83.33% of the population of Asansol Sadar subdivision was urban and 16.67% was rural. In 2015, the municipal areas of Kulti, Raniganj and Jamuria were included within the jurisdiction of Asansol Municipal Corporation. Asansol Sadar subdivision has 26 (+1 partly) Census Towns.(partly presented in the map alongside; all places marked on the map are linked in the full-screen map).

== Civic administration ==
=== CD block HQ ===
The headquarters of Jamuria CD block are located at Bahadurpur.

== Demographics ==
According to the 2011 Census of India, Bahadurpur had a total population of 2,514 of which 1,318 (52%) were males and 1,196 (48%) were females. Population in the age range 0–6 years was 260. The total number of literate persons in Bahadurpur was 1,622 (71.96% of the population over 6 years).

*For language details see Jamuria (community development block)#Language and religion

== Education ==
Bahadurpur High School is a co-educational higher secondary school.

== Healthcare ==
Bahadurpur Rural Hospital, with 30 beds, is the major government medical facility in the Jamuria CD block. Akalpur Block Primary Health Centre functions at Akalpur with 10 beds. There are primary health centres at Churulia (with 6 beds), Sirishdanaga, PO Mandi (with 6 beds), Birkulti (with 2 beds) and Chinchuria (with 6 beds).
