= Parashkol =

- Census Town
- Location in West Bengal, India Parashkol (India)
- Coordinates: 23°38′29.0″N 87°11′22.2″E
- Country: India
- State: West Bengal
- District: Paschim Bardhaman

Area
  - Total: 6.80 km^{2} (2.63 sq mi)

Population (2011)
  - Total: 11,112
  - Density: 1,630/km^{2} (4,230/sq mi)

Languages*
  - Official: Bengali, Hindi, English
- Time zone: UTC+5:30 (IST)
- PIN: 713322
- Telephone/STD code: 0341
- Vehicle registration: WB
- Website: paschimbardhaman.co.in

Parashkol is a census town located partly in the Pandabeswar CD block and partly in the Andal CD block of the Durgapur subdivision in the Paschim Bardhaman district in the Indian state of West Bengal.

== Geography ==
Cities, towns and ECL Areas in the northern portion of Durgapur subdivision in Paschim Bardhaman district
MC: Municipal Corporation, CT: census town, R: rural administrative centre
Owing to space constraints in the small map, the actual locations in a larger map may vary slightly

=== Location ===
Konardihi, Nabgram, Chak Bankola, Sankarpur, Haripur, Bahula, Chhora and Parashkol form a cluster of census towns in the southern portion of Pandabeswar CD block.

=== Urbanisation ===
According to the 2011 census, 79.22% of the population of the Durgapur subdivision was urban and 20.78% was rural. Durgapur subdivision has 1 municipal corporation at Durgapur and 38 (+1 partly) census towns (partly presented in the map alongside; all places marked on the map are linked in the full-screen map).

== Demographics ==
According to the 2011 Census of India the portion of Parashkol in Pandabeswar CD block had a total population of 10,367, of which 5,483 (53%) were males and 4,884 (47%) were females. Population in the age range 0–6 years was 1,223. The total number of literate persons in this portion of Parashkol was 6,470 (70.76% of the population over 6 years). The portion of Parashkol in Andal CD block had a total population of 845, of which 480 (57%) were males and 365 (43%) were females. Population in the age range 0–6 years was 80. The total number of literate persons in this portion of Parashkol was 625 (81.70% of the population over 6 years).

*For language details see Andal (community development block)#Language and religion

As of 2001 India census, Parashkol had a population of 10,989. Males constitute 56% of the population and females 44%. Parashkol has an average literacy rate of 57%, lower than the national average of 59.5%: male literacy is 68%, and female literacy is 44%. In Parashkol, 14% of the population is under 6 years of age.

== Infrastructure ==
According to the District Census Handbook 2011, Bardhaman, Parashkol covered an area of 0.07+6.73 km^{2}. Among the civic amenities, the protected water-supply involved overhead tank, tap water from treated sources, hand pump, tubewell, borewell. It had 75+856 domestic electric connections. Among the educational facilities it had were 4+1 primary schools, 0+3 middle schools, 0+1 secondary school, the nearest senior secondary school at Andal 7 km away. Among the important commodities it produced were paddy, bricks, vegetables.

== Economy ==
It is in the heart of the coal mining zone.

As per ECL website telephone numbers, operational collieries in the Kajora Area of Eastern Coalfields in 2018 are: Central Kajora Colliery, Jambad OCP, Jambad UG, Khas Kajora Colliery, Lachipur Colliery, Madhusudanpur Colliery, Madhabpur Colliery, Naba Kajora Colliery and Porascole Colliery.

== Education ==
Parashkol has two primary schools.

== Healthcare ==
Medical facilities in the Kajora Area of ECL are available at Kajora Area Dispensary (Kajora Morh, PO Kajoragram), Madhusudanpur Colliery (PO Dakshin Khanda), Naba Kajora (PO Kajora Gram), Jambad (UG) (PO Parasea), Madhabpur (PO Kajoragram), Parascole (E&W) (PO Parascole), Khas Kajora (PO Kajoragram), Lachipur (PO Kajoragram), Central Kajora (PO Kajoragram), Jambad OCP (PO Parasea).
