= Sankarpur, Kanchanpur =

Coordinates: 28°46′N 80°23′E

Sankarpur शंकरपुर
- Village development committee
- Interactive map of Sankarpur
- Country: Nepal
- Province: Sudurpashchim Province
- District: Kanchanpur District

Population (1991)
  - Total: 6,538
- Time zone: UTC+5:45 (Nepal Time)

Sankarpur is a village development committee in Kanchanpur District in Sudurpashchim Province of south-western Nepal. At the time of the 1991 Nepal census it had a population of 6538.
