= Sankarpur, Darchula =

Sankarpur शंकरपुर Pasti
- Village Development Committee
- Location in Nepal
- Coordinates: 29°43′N 80°28′E
- Country: Nepal
- Zone: Mahakali Zone
- District: Darchula District

Population (1991)
  - Total: 2,645
- Time zone: UTC+5:45 (Nepal Time)

Sankarpur is a Village Development Committee in Darchula District in the Mahakali Zone of western Nepal. At the time of the 1991 Nepal census it had a population of 2645 people residing in 460 individual households.
