= Chinchuria =

- Census Town
- Location in West Bengal, India Chinchuria (India)
- Coordinates: 23.71219°N 87.188974°E
- Country: India
- State: West Bengal
- District: Paschim Bardhaman

Area
  - Total: 7.5333 km^{2} (2.9086 sq mi)

Population (2011)
  - Total: 6,617
  - Density: 878.4/km^{2} (2,275/sq mi)

Languages*
  - Official: Bengali, Hindi, English
- Time zone: UTC+5:30 (IST)
- PIN: 713378
- Telephone code: 0341
- Vehicle registration: WB
- Lok Sabha constituency: Asansol
- Vidhan Sabha constituency: Jamuria
- Website: bardhaman.gov.in

Chinchuria is a census town in the Jamuria CD block in the Asansol Sadar subdivision of the Paschim Bardhaman district in the Indian state of West Bengal.

== Geography ==
Cities and towns in the eastern portion of Asansol Sadar subdivision in Paschim Bardhaman district
MC: Municipal Corporation, CT: census town, N: neighbourhood, R: rural centre
Owing to space constraints in the small map, the actual locations in a larger map may vary slightly

=== Location ===
Chinchuria is located at 23.71219°N 87.188974°E

=== Urbanisation ===
According to the 2011 census, 83.33% of the population of Asansol Sadar subdivision was urban and 16.67% was rural. In 2015, the municipal areas of Kulti, Raniganj and Jamuria were included within the jurisdiction of Asansol Municipal Corporation. Asansol Sadar subdivision has 26 (+1 partly) Census Towns.(partly presented in the map alongside; all places marked on the map are linked in the full-screen map).

== Demographics ==
According to the 2011 Census of India, Chinchuria had a total population of 6,617 of which 3,458 (52%) were males and 3,159 (48%) were females. Population in the age range 0–6 years was 691. The total number of literate persons in Chinchuria was 4,525 (76.36% of the population over 6 years).

*For language details see Jamuria (community development block)#Language and religion

== Infrastructure ==
According to the District Census Handbook 2011, Bardhaman, Chinchuria covered an area of 7.5333 km^{2}. Among the civic amenities, it had 3 km roads with both open and covered drains, the protected water supply involved service reservoir, overhead tank, uncovered wells. It had 1,000 domestic electric connections. Among the medical facilities it had 2 medicine shops. Among the educational facilities it had were 2 primary schools, 1 middle school, 1 secondary school, 1 senior secondary school, the nearest general degree college at Khandra 15 km away. Among the social, cultural and recreational facilities were 1 auditorium/ community hall, 1 public library, 1 reading room. Among the important commodities it manufactured were pottery, black smith and carpentry materials.

== Economy ==
As per ECL website telephone numbers, operational collieries in the Kenda Area of Eastern Coalfields in 2018 are: Bahula Colliery, Chora Block Incline, CI Jambad Colliery, Chora OCP, Haripur Colliery, Lower Kenda Colliery, New Kenda Colliery, Siduli Colliery, SK OCP, West Kenda OCP.

In Sonpur Bazari project located nearby, Seam R-IV is also referred to as Chinchuria seam.

== Education ==
Chinchuria has there primary and one higher secondary schools - Chinchuria Upendranath High School.

Chinchuria Upendranath High School is a Bengali-medium coeducational institution established in 1965. It has facilities for teaching from class V to class XII.

Khaskenda Saraswati Sishu Mandir (KKSSM) School is an English & Bengali medium coeducational institution established in 2011. It has facilities for teaching from Play to class V. https://kmssm.business.site/ & https://kkssmschool.in/

== Healthcare ==
There is a primary health centre at Chinchuria, with 6 beds.
