= Pandabeswar =

- Neighborhood in Durgapur, West Bengal
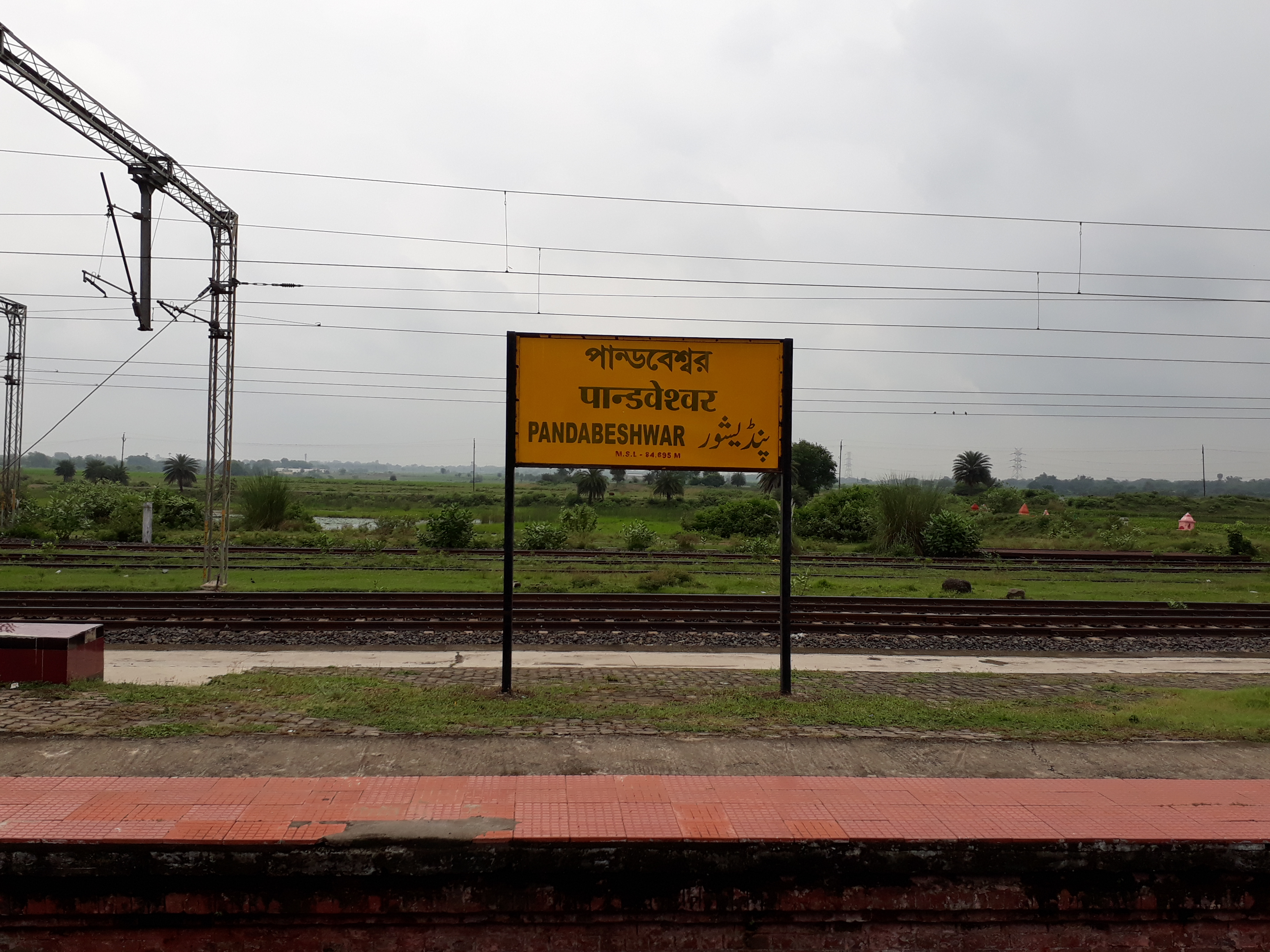
- Pandabeswar railway station

- Location in West Bengal, India Pandabeswar (India)
- Coordinates: 23°43′12.0″N 87°16′48.0″E
- Country: India
- City: Durgapur
- State: West Bengal
- District: Paschim Bardhaman
- Established: 19th Century

Languages
  - Official: Bengali, English
- Time zone: UTC+5:30 (IST)
- PIN: 713346 (Pandaveshwar)
- Telephone/STD code: 0341
- Vehicle registration: WB40/38
- Lok Sabha constituency: Bardhaman-Durgapur
- Vidhan Sabha constituency: Pandaveswar
- Website: bardhaman.gov.in

Pandabeswar (also spelled Pandaveswar) is a neighborhood, a community development block and an administrative centre in Pandabeswar CD Block in the city of Durgapur of Paschim Bardhaman district in the state of West Bengal, India.

== Geography ==
Cities, towns and ECL Areas in the northern portion of Durgapur subdivision in Paschim Bardhaman district
MC: Municipal Corporation, CT: census town, R: rural/urban administrative centre
Owing to space constraints in the small map, the actual locations in a larger map may vary slightly

=== Police station ===
Pandabeswar police station has jurisdiction over Pandabeswar CD Block. The area covered is 161 km^{2} and the population covered is 176,445.

=== CD Block HQ ===
The headquarters of Pandabeswar CD Block are located at Pandabeswar.

=== Urbanisation ===
As per the 2011 census, 79.22% of the population of Durgapur subdivision was urban and 20.78% was rural. Durgapur subdivision has 1 municipal corporation at Durgapur and 38 (+1 partly) census towns (partly presented in the map alongside; all places marked on the map are linked in the full-screen map).

== Demographics ==
Pandabeswar is shown as part of Baidyanathpur in the map of Pandabeswar CD Block on page 243 of the District Census Handbook, Bardhaman, 2011. Separate demographic statistics are not available.

== Economy ==
As per the Shodhganga website, collieries in the Pandaveswar Area of Eastern Coalfields are: Madhaipur, Mandarbani, Nutandanga, Pandaveswar, Dalurbandh, Kendra, Samla, South Samla, Sonpur Bazari, Khottadih, Kankartala, Dalurbandh OCP, Palasthali OCP and Gangaramchak OCP.

As per ECL website telephone numbers, operational collieries in the Pandaveswar Area in 2018 are: Dalurband Colliery, Khottadih OCP, Khottadih UG, Madhaipur Colliery, Manderbony Colliery, Pandaveswar Colliery and South Samla Colliery.

== Transport ==
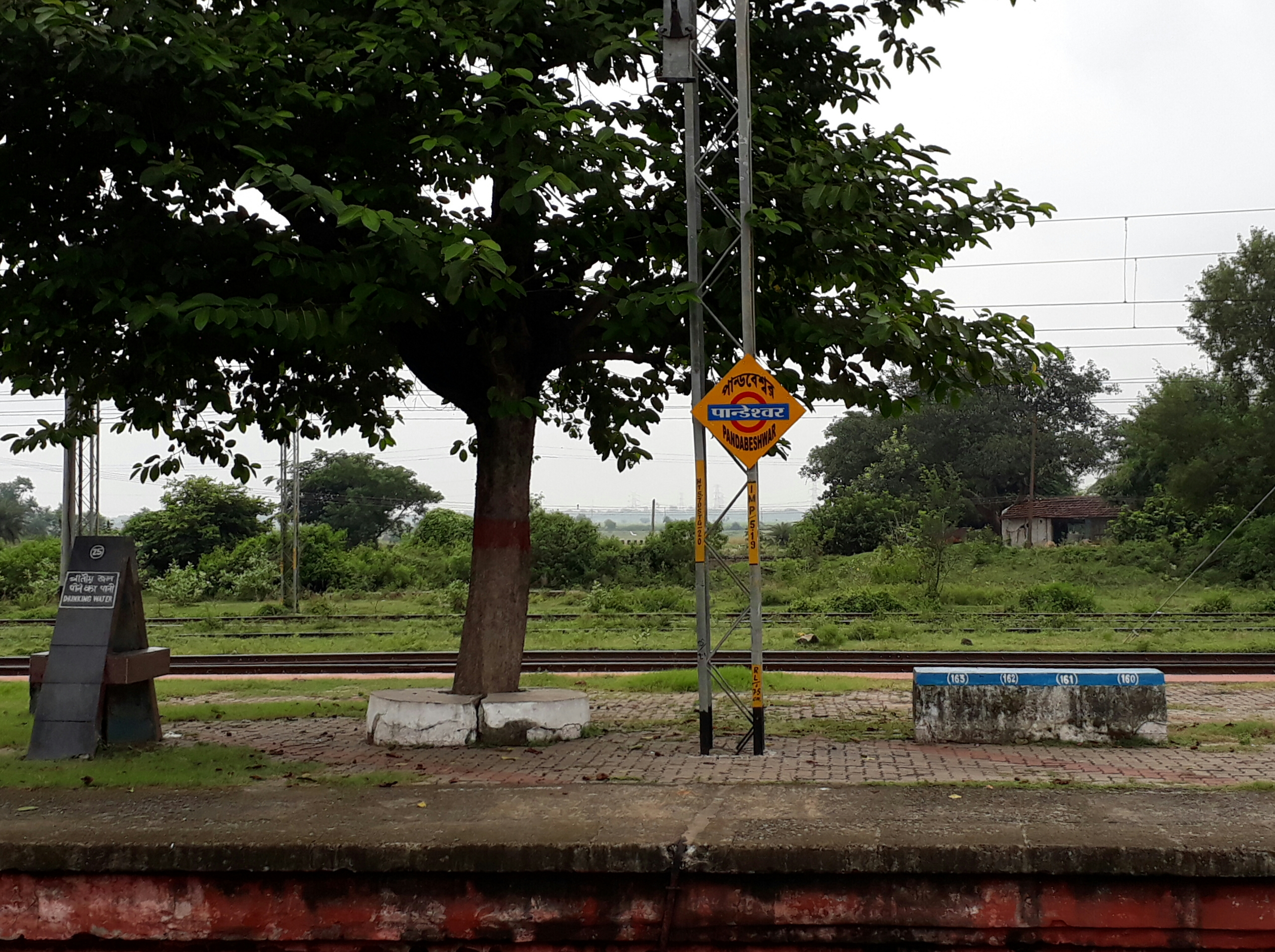
Pandabeswar Railway Station

There is a Railway station in Pandabeswar on the Andal-Sainthia branch line.

NH 14 (old number NH 60) passes through Pandabeswar.

== Education ==
Pandaveswar College was established at Pandabeswar in 2005. It is affiliated with Kazi Nazrul University. It offers honours courses in Hindi, English, history and political science.

== Healthcare ==
Pandabeswar Block Primary Health Centre, Pandabeswar CD block, with 10 beds, at Pandabeswar, is the major government medical facility in the Pandaveswar CD block.

Medical facilities (dispensaries) in the Pandaveswar Area of ECL are available at Pandaveswar Area PME Centre (PO Pandaveswar), Madhaipur (PO Nutundanga), Mandarboni (PO Nutundanga), South Samla (PO Pandaveswar), Pandaveswar (PO Pandaveswar), Dalurbandh (PO Pandaveswar), Khottadih (PO Khottadih), Area Dispensary (PO Pandaveswar).
