= Pandabeswar Assembly constituency =

Pandabeswar
- Constituency No. 275 for the West Bengal Legislative Assembly
- Interactive Map Outlining Pandabeswar Assembly Constituency

Constituency details
- Country: India
- Region: East India
- State: West Bengal
- District: Paschim Bardhaman
- Lok Sabha constituency: Asansol
- Established: 2011
- Total electors: 167,922
- Reservation: None

Member of Legislative Assembly
- 18th West Bengal Legislative Assembly
- Incumbent Jitendra Tiwari
- Party: Bharatiya Janata Party
- Elected year: 2026
- Preceded by: Narendranath Chakraborty

Pandabeswar Assembly constituency is an assembly constituency in Paschim Bardhaman district in the Indian state of West Bengal.

== Overview ==
As per orders of the Delimitation Commission, No. 275 Pandabeswar assembly constituency covers Pandabeswar and Faridpur-Durgapur community development blocks.

Pandabeswar assembly segment is part of No. 40 Asansol (Lok Sabha constituency).

== Members of the Legislative Assembly ==
Year	Name	Party
2011	Gouranga Chatterjee	Communist Party of India (Marxist)
2016	Jitendra Tiwari	All India Trinamool Congress
2021	Narendranath Chakraborty	All India Trinamool Congress
2026	Jitendra Tiwari	Bharatiya Janata Party

== Election results ==
=== 2026 ===
2026 West Bengal Legislative Assembly election: Pandabeswar
Party	Candidate	Votes	%	±%
BJP	Jitendra Tiwari	80,501	46.08	+3.4
AITC	Narendranath Chakraborty	79,103	45.28	+0.29
CPI(M)	Prabir Kumar Mondal	8,048	4.61	−2.81
Independent	Sawana Khatun	1,897	1.09	
NOTA	None of the above	1,289	0.74	−0.92
Majority		1,398	0.8	−1.51
Turnout		174,712	92.69	+15.18
BJP gain from AITC		Swing		

=== 2021 ===
2021 West Bengal Legislative Assembly election: Pandabeswar
Party	Candidate	Votes	%	±%
AITC	Narendranath Chakraborty	73,922	44.99	▼0.05
BJP	Jitendra Tiwari	70,119	42.68	▲33.75
CPI(M)	Subhas Bauri	12,196	7.42	▼80.69
Independent	Sanjay Yadav	2,273	1.38	
NOTA	None of the above	2,735	1.66	
Majority		3,803	2.31	
Turnout		164,291	77.51	
AITC hold		Swing		

=== 2016 ===
2016 West Bengal Legislative Assembly election: Pandabeswar
Party	Candidate	Votes	%	±%
AITC	Jitendra Tiwari	68,600	45.04	
CPI(M)	Gouranga Chatterjee	63,130	41.44	
BJP	Jiten Chatterjee	13,604	8.93	
SUCI(C)	Asim Kumar Bhattacharjee	1,580	1.04	
NOTA	None of the above	2,653	1.74	
Majority		5,470	3.59	
Turnout		1,52,403	79.81	
AITC gain from CPI(M)		Swing		

=== 2011 ===
2011 West Bengal Legislative Assembly election: Pandabeswar
Party	Candidate	Votes	%	±%
CPI(M)	Gouranga Chatterjee	67,240	49.69	−16.31
AITC	Md. Zahir Alam Ansari	59,429	43.92	
BJP	Ashish Garai	4,511	3.33	
IND	Ramprasad Mukherjee	2,161	1.60	
IND	Nayan Gope	1,976	1.46	
Majority		7,811	5.77	
Turnout		1,35,317	80.51	
CPI(M) win (new seat)				

.# Change for CPI(M) calculated on the basis of its vote percentage in 2006 in the Ukhra constituency. Trinamool Congress did not contest the Ukhra seat in 2006.
