= Kalighat painting =

School of Indian painting

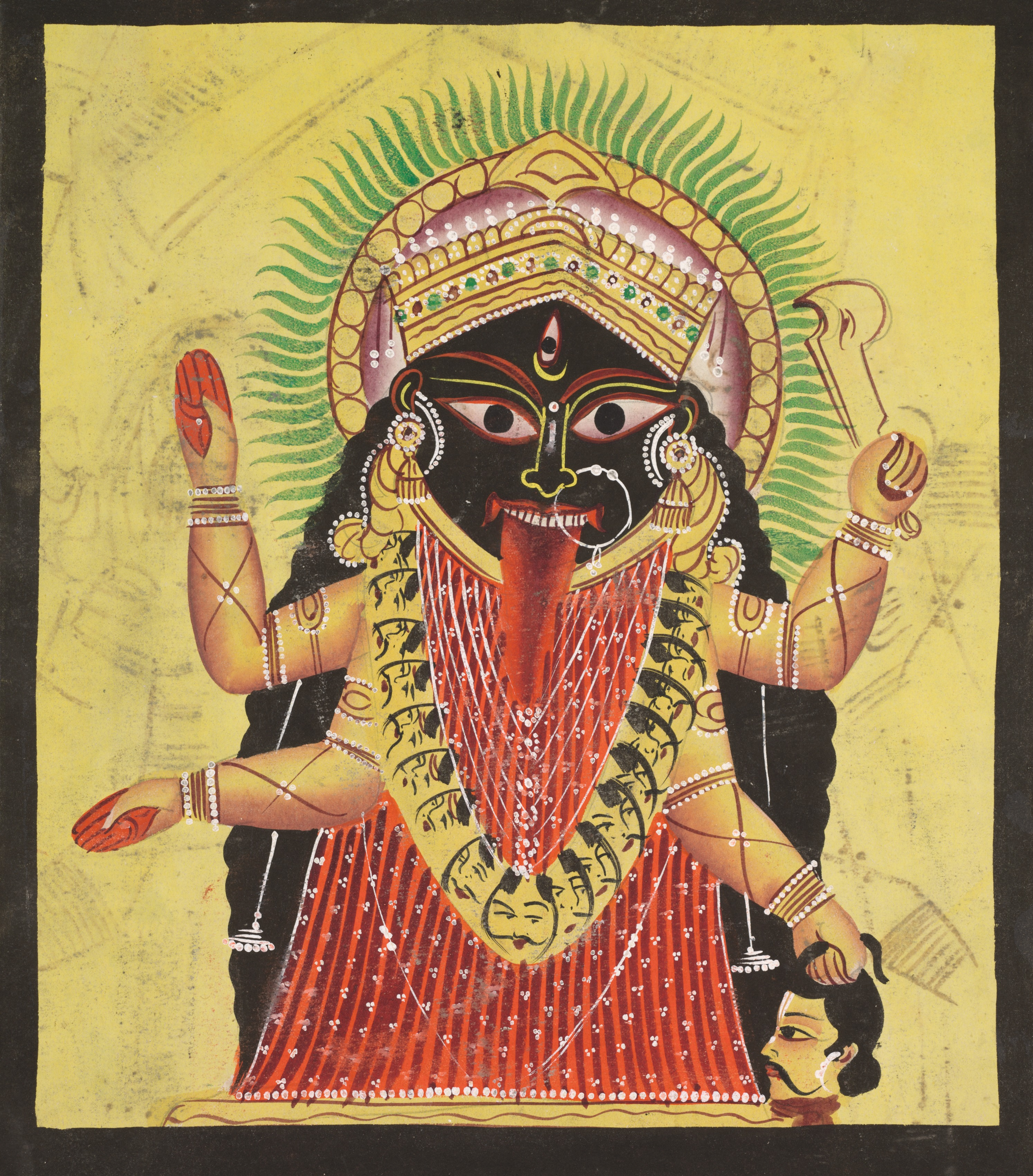
A Kalighat painting of Goddess Kali. This is a representation of the idol installed in the Kalighat Temple, around which the Kalighat School of painting developed.

Kalighat painting, Kalighat Patachitra, or Kalighat Pat (Bengali: কালীঘাট পটচিত্র) is a style of Indian paintings which originated in the 19th century. It was first practiced by a group of specialized scroll painters known as the patuas in the vicinity of the Kalighat Kali Temple in Kolkata (formerly Calcutta), in the present Indian state of West Bengal. Composed of bold outlines, vibrant colour tones, and minimal background details, these paintings and drawings were done on both hand-made and machine manufactured paper. The paintings depicted mythological stories, figures of Hindu gods and goddesses, as well as scenes from everyday life and society, thereby recording a socio-cultural landscape which was undergoing a series of transitions during the 19th and early 20th century, when the Kalighat pat reached its pinnacle.

Today the Victoria and Albert Museum in London hosts the single largest collection of Kalighat paintings in the world with 645 paintings, including watercolors, line-drawings, and hand-painted lithographs.

== History ==
The exact origin of Kalighat painting is a matter of debate among art critics and historians. There exists no historical account that records a specific date or traces the beginnings of this school, established by the patuas at Kalighat. Material evidence, such as the type of paper and colors used in the paintings, suggests that they belong to the first half of the 19th century. Furthermore, noting the dates of acquisition of these paintings by various European collectors, historians have concluded that the emergence of the paintings roughly coincides with the establishment of the present-day Kali temple at Kalighat in approximately the first or second quarter of the 19th century. The Victoria and Albert Museum website mentions, for instance, that the artworks in the museum were "created and collected over a period of 100 years from the 1830s to the 1930s". However, S. Chakravarti estimates “Kalighat paintings were in vogue not earlier than the 1850s”.

Kalighat Paintings: Diversity of Themes

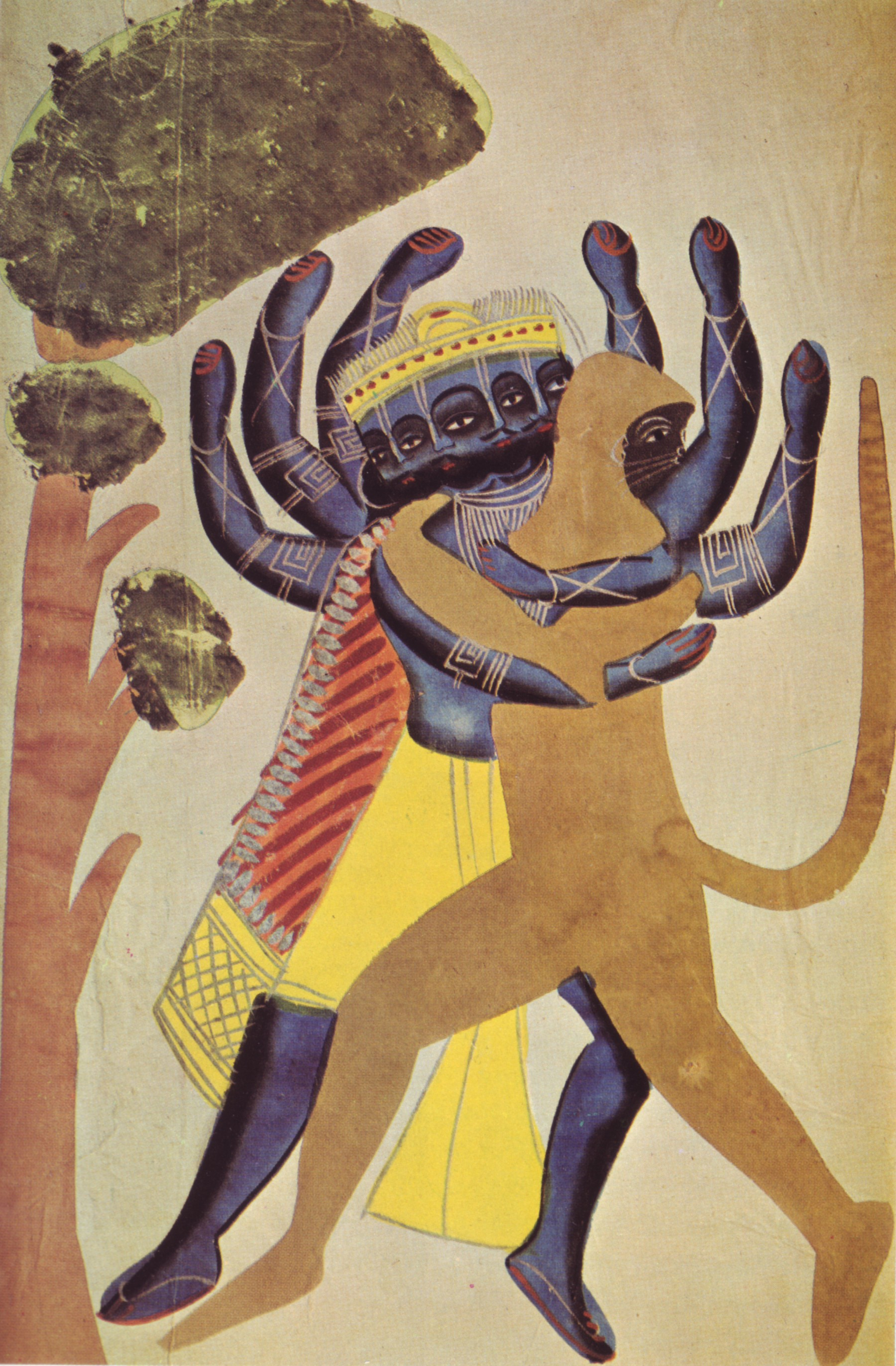
Hanuman fights Ravana, a scene from the epic Ramayana, c. 1880.

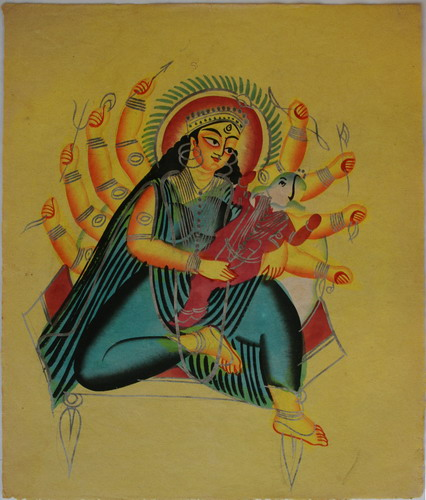
Ganesha in the lap of Parvati.

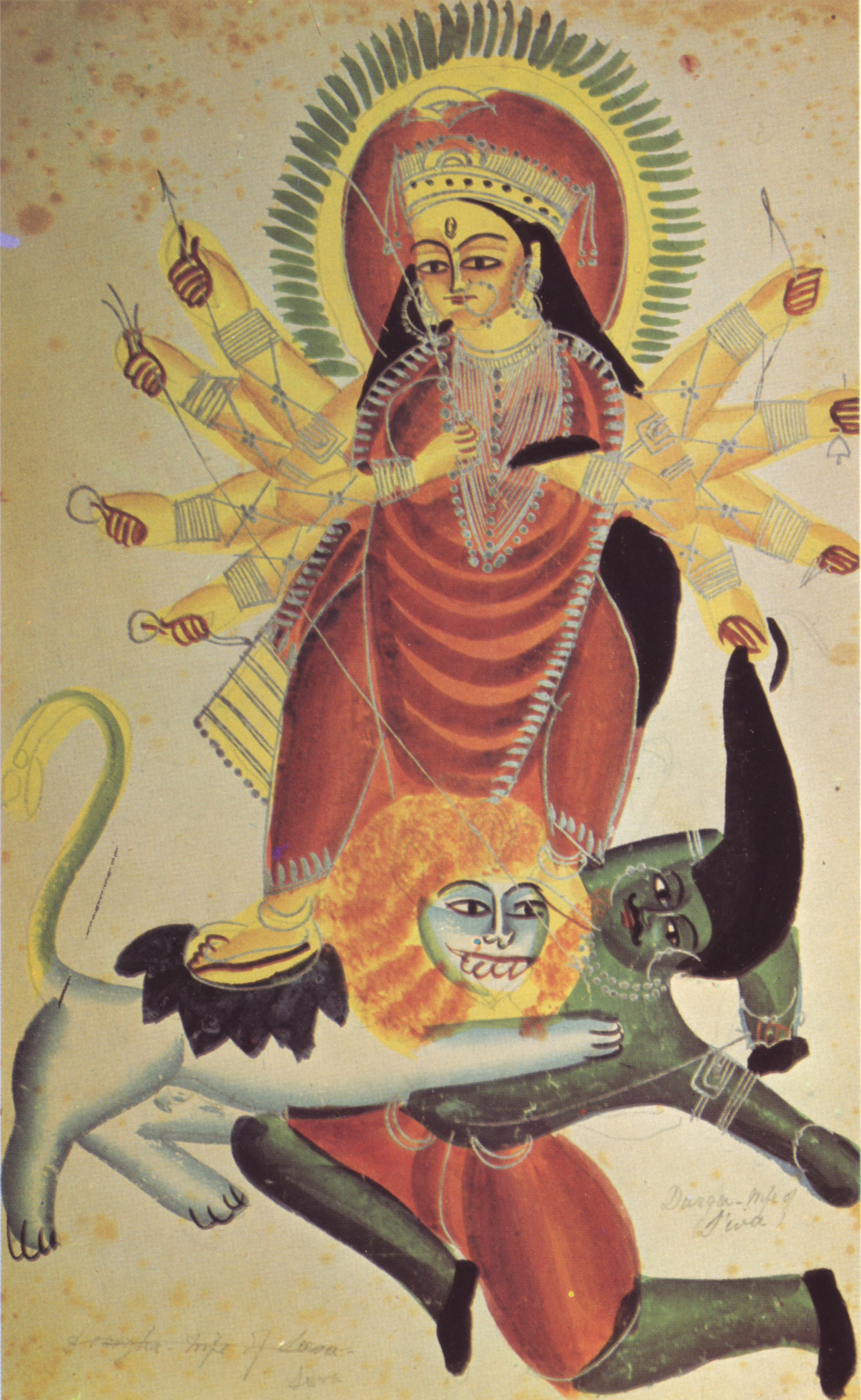
Durga and Mahishasura, c. 1880.

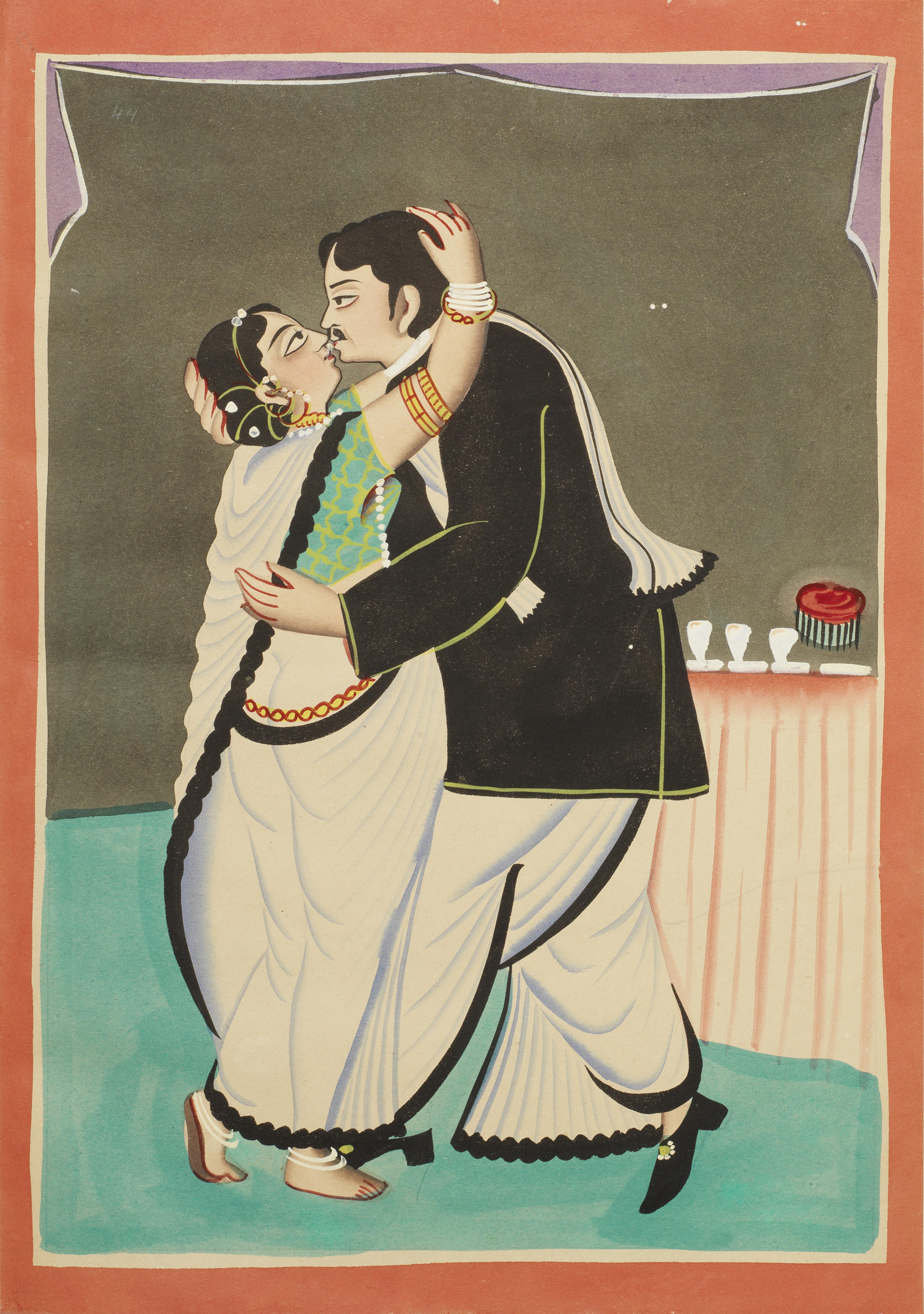
Babu and Bibi in an intimate embrace.

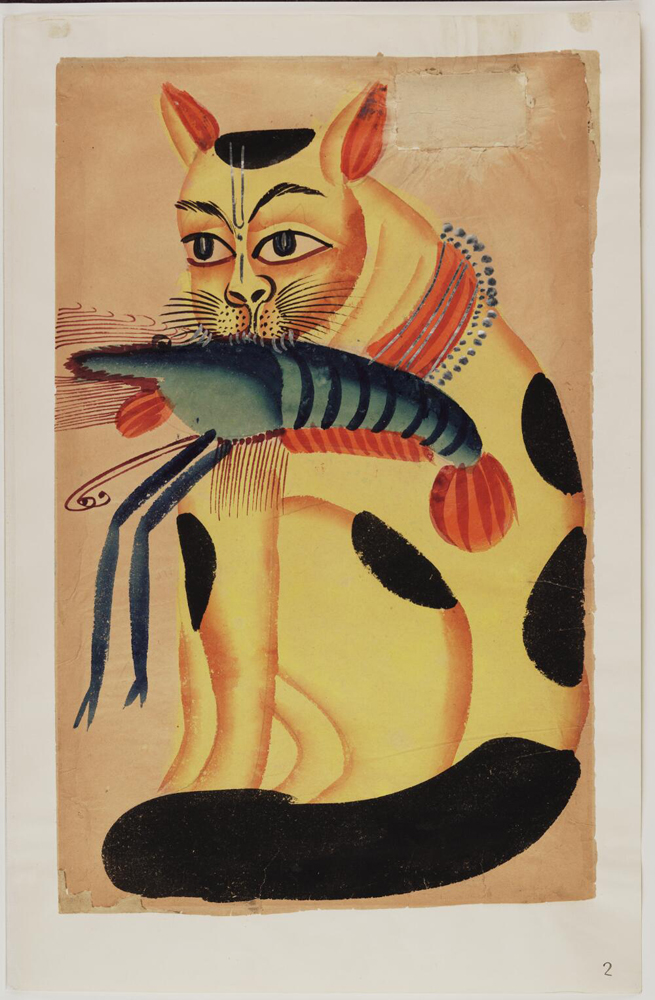
Cat with Vaishnavite mark on forehead stealing a crayfish, perhaps a representation of a Bengali satire or proverb on religion.

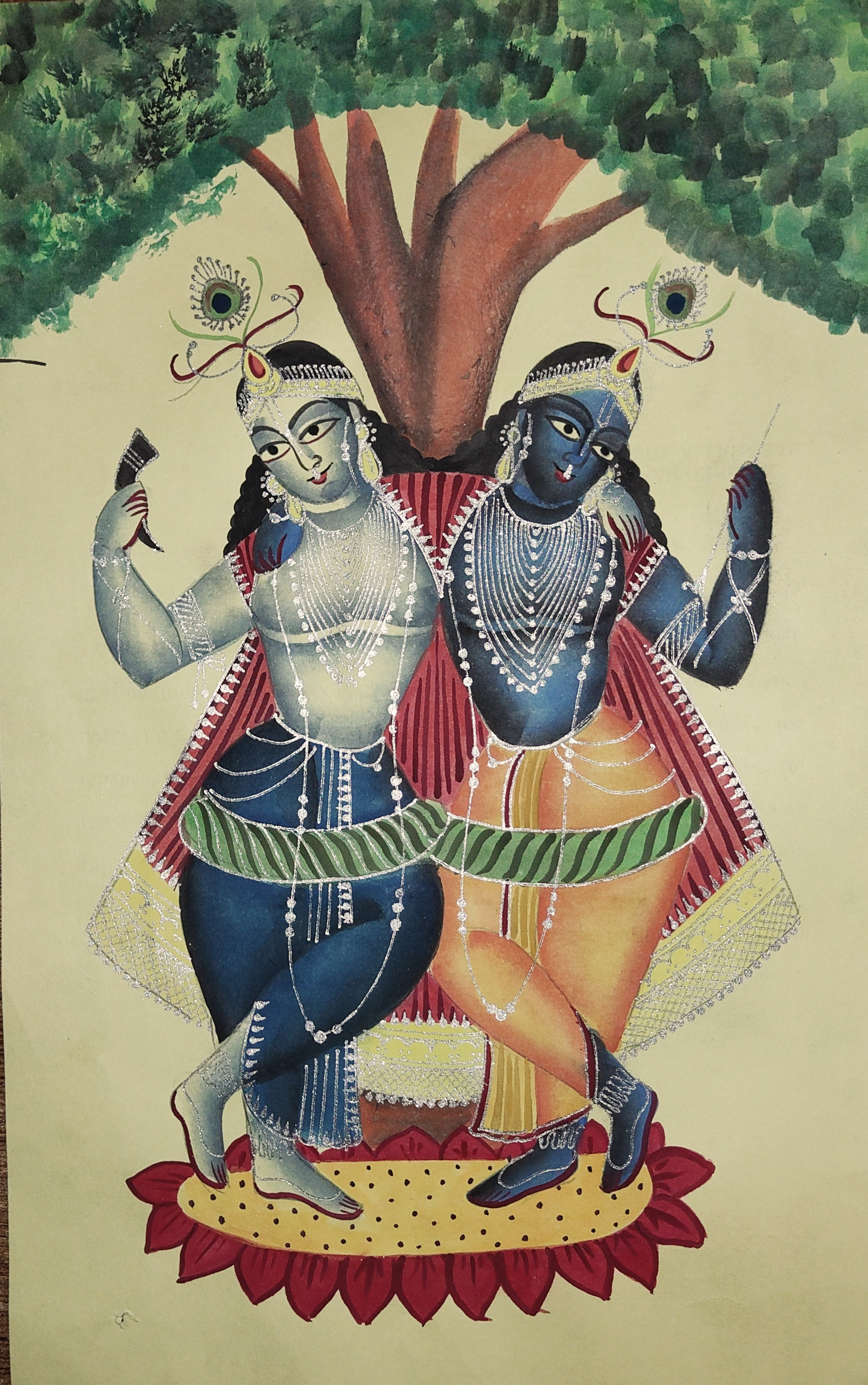
Krishna and Balram

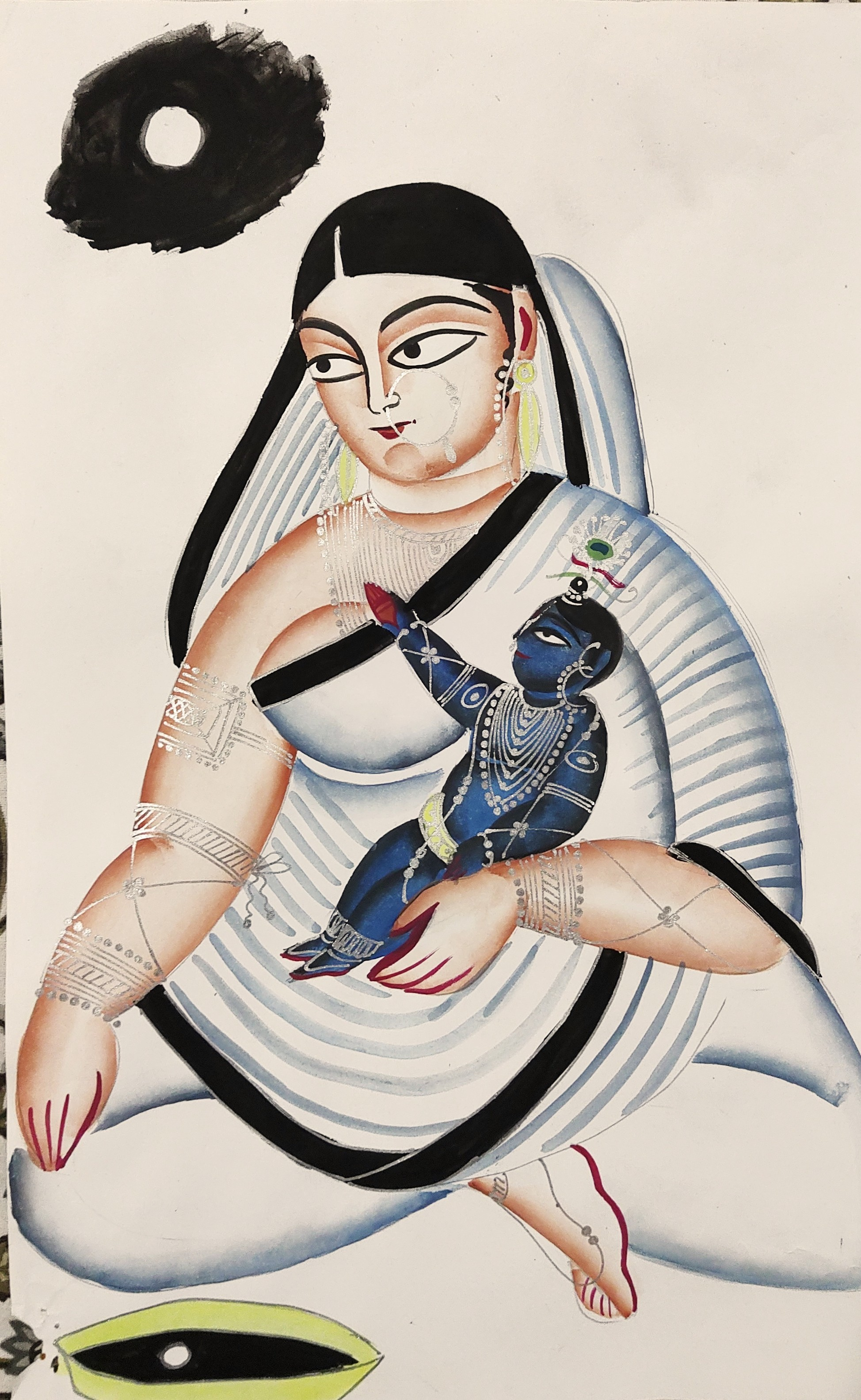
Yashoda coaxing Baby Krishna

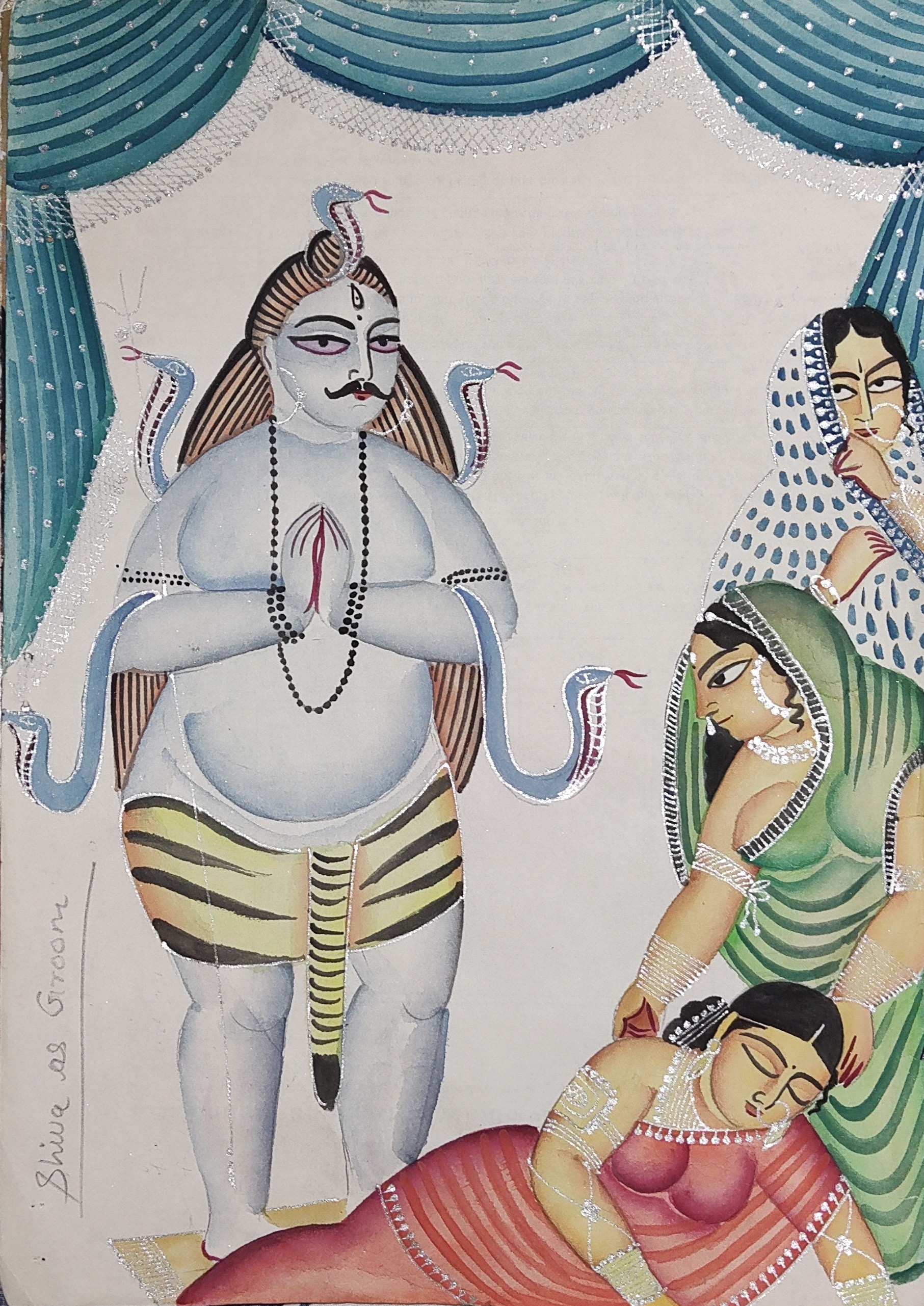
Shiva as Groom and fainted Mother-in-law

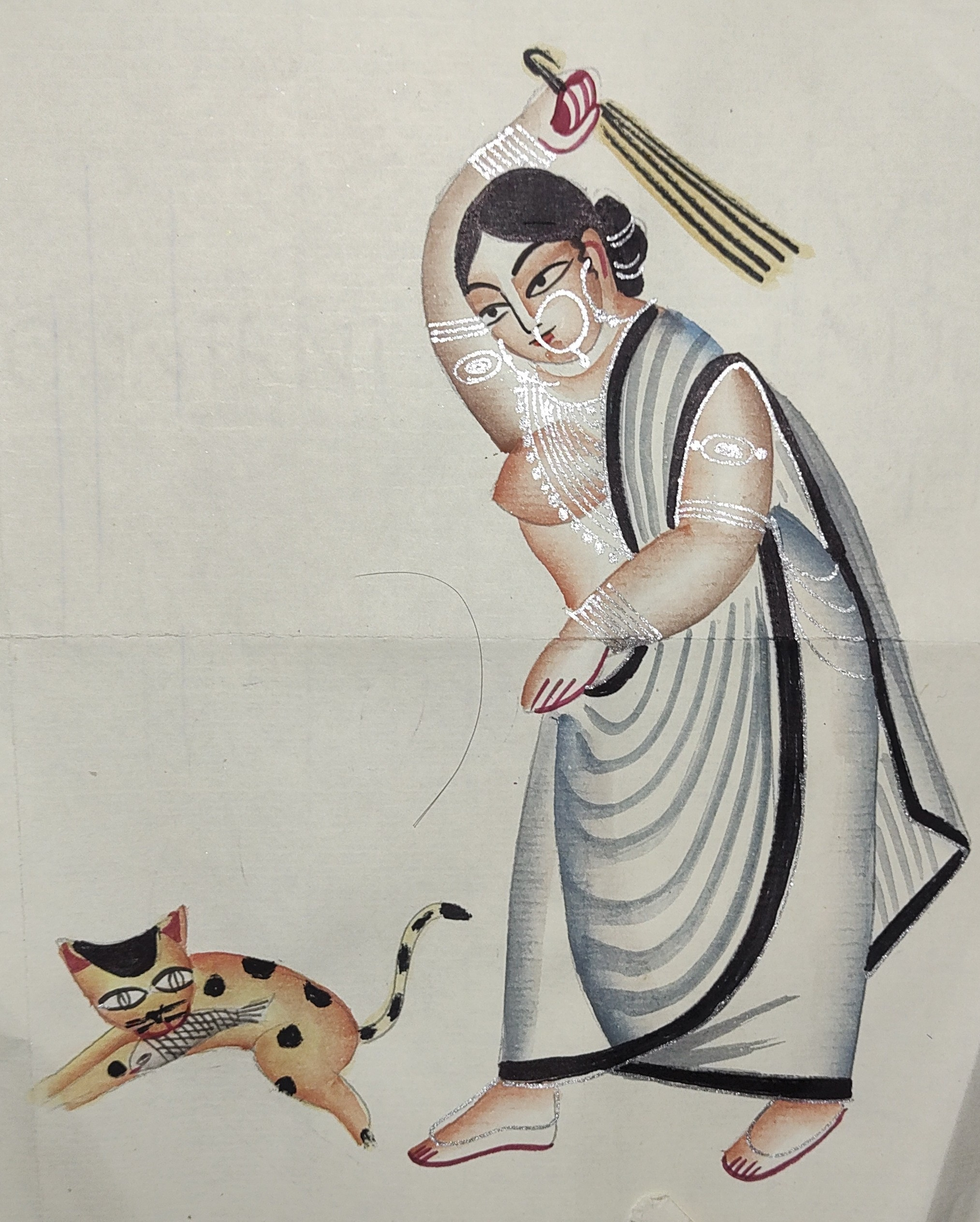
Lady and the cat

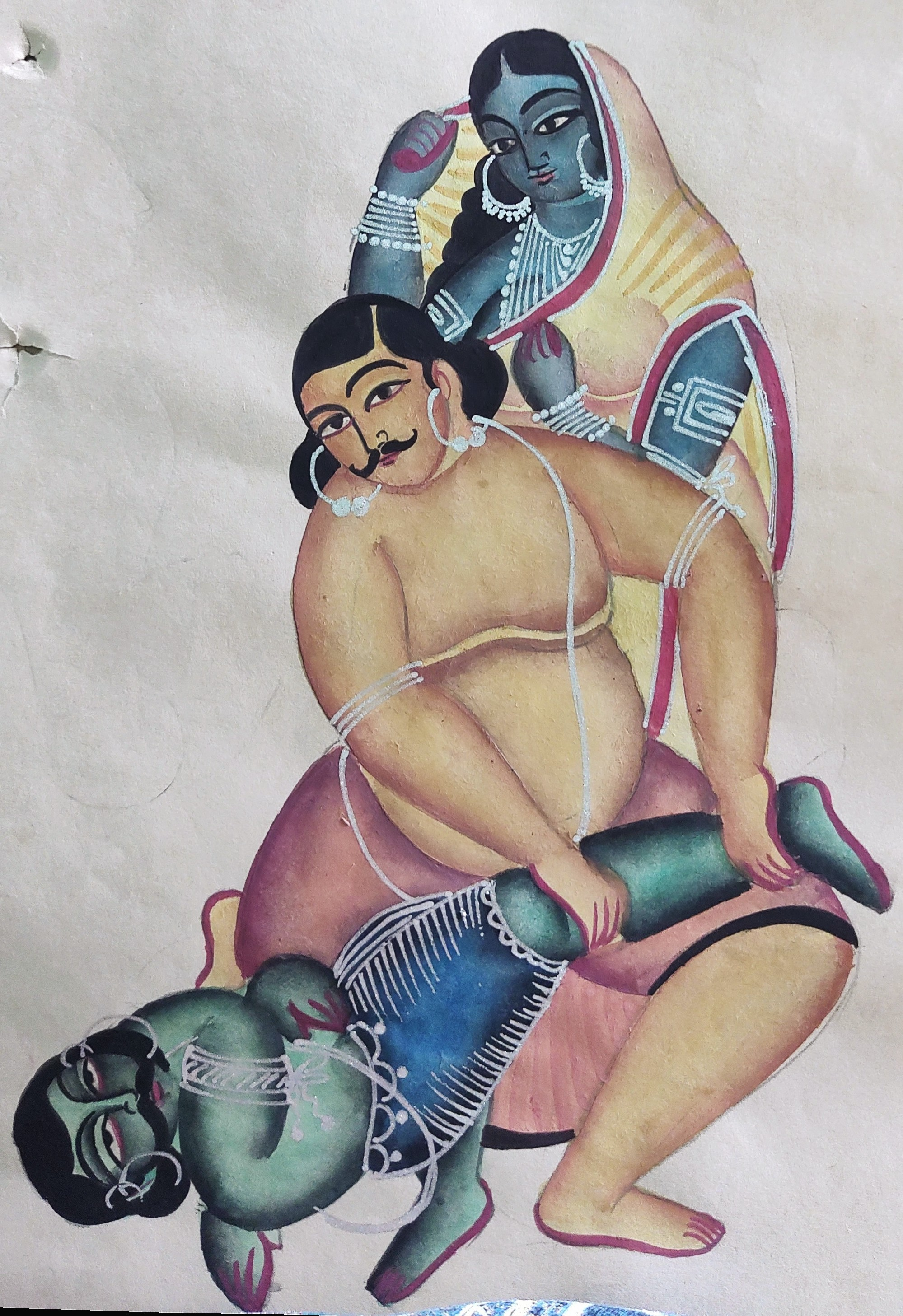
Kichak-Vadh from Mahabharat

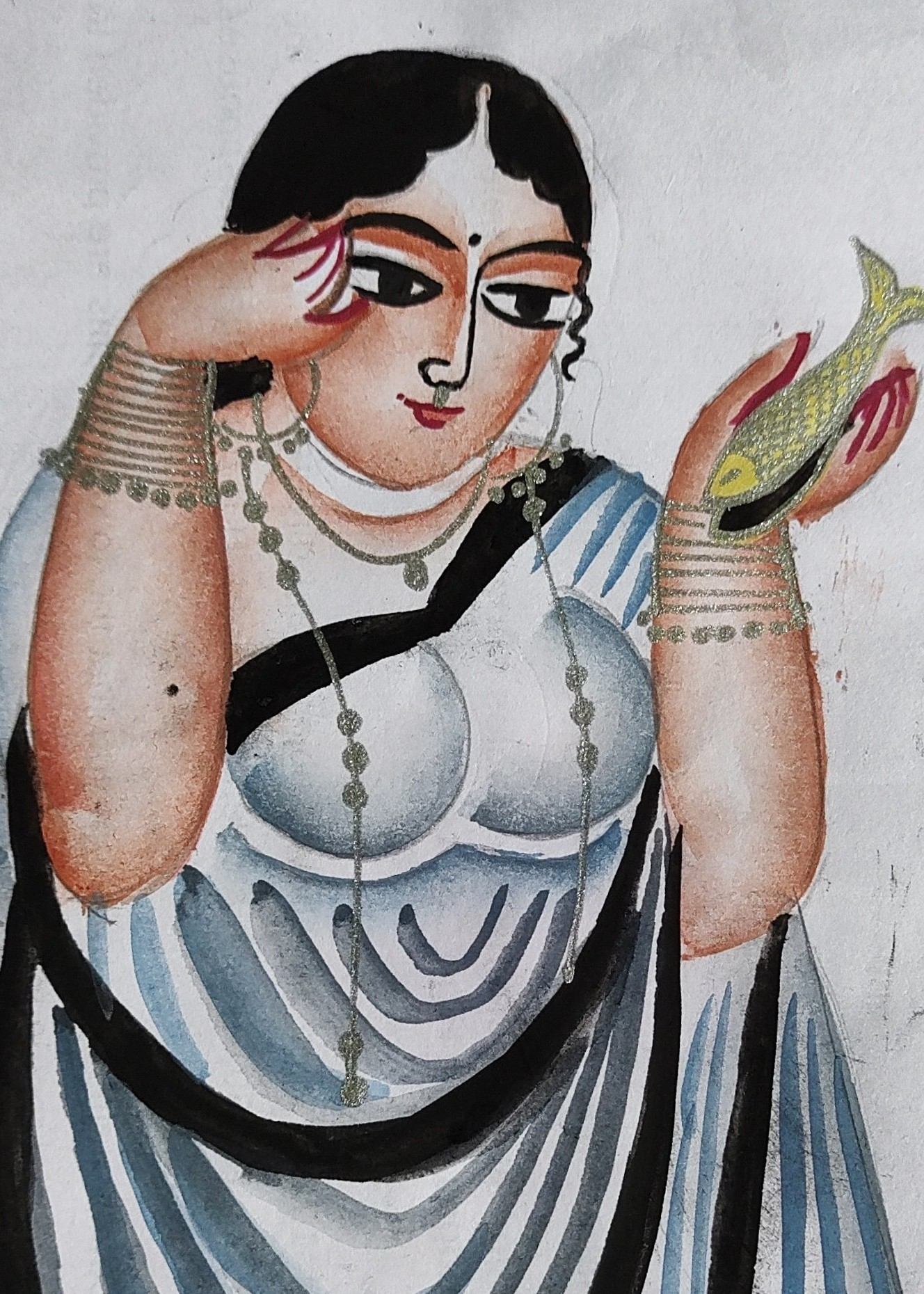
A lady applying kohl

Moreover, it was by the early 19th century that Calcutta evolved as an economic centre driven by the commercial activities generated by the British and other European settlers which attracted immigrants looking for employment opportunities. The Kalighat Temple, in the southern part of the city, became a popular destination which attracted hundreds of pilgrims, certain foreign visitors as well as the local people. The artisans and craftsmen, for whom the temple premises provided the perfect opportunity to sell their products. The artisans and craftsmen started migrating to the region with the hope of capitalizing on the new growing market. Among them were the patuas, the skilled artists who hailed from rural Bengal, especially from the areas of Midnapore and the 24 Parganas. These artists would traditionally paint long narrative stories on scrolls of cloth or handmade paper, which often expanded to a length of 20 meters and beyond. Such an art form was known as patachitra, each section was called the pat which explains why the artists were known as patuas. The first mention of such a group of travelling folk painters appears in the thirteenth-century text, the Brahma Vaivarta Purana. These artists depicted conventional images of deities and scenes from the two Hindu epics, carrying their scrolls while moving from one place to another, and singing the scenes and episodes portrayed in the paintings in public gatherings or during festivals in villages.

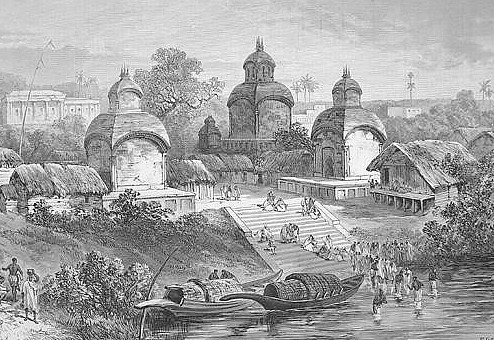
The Kalighat Temple, and the river, Adi Ganga, 1887.

Now, after having migrated to the Kalighat region, these artists, faced with the challenge to speed up their pace of production, and under the influence of different art forms around them, substituted their usual long linear, narrative style with single frames of chouko (square) pat showing one or two figures, they also eliminated unnecessary details, left the background plain and simple, and used a basic color palette, thereby evolving in due course of time the intrinsic features of the Kalighat genre. They were aided by the import of mill-made paper and readymade paints from Britain. These artists no longer had to travel to audiences, for now potential buyers came to them; and their way of conducting business changed as they became sellers of their works, instead of entertainers who earlier used to perform their piece. Hence, there was a complete shift in their style and perspectives from their rural days once they migrated and settled in the city from the mid-eighteenth century onwards. This "basic imperative of producing pictures cheaply, quickly, and in vast numbers to cater to the growing market of the city" served as the major motivation behind the changes in form and format of these paintings as has been pointed out by scholars from W.G. Archer to Tapati Guha-Thakurta and Jyotindra Jain, until recently. These artists would set up stalls and their settlements around the main shrine of Kali, and along the ghat of the Adi Ganga, referring to the old abandoned riverbed flowing beside the temple premises which was the ancient course of the Ganges.

However, notable art historian and museologist Jyotindra Jain holds a different view about the Kalighat artists. He notes that there are “certain inherent correspondences between Kalighat paintings and the traditions of making and painting clay figures, or painting storytellers’ scrolls by the patuas, or between the sutradhar carpenters’ sketches and wood carvings”. suggesting that the potters, carpenters and stoneworkers and the traditional craftsmen of Bengal were also associated with the creation of the paintings apart from the patuas.

Not just with the local inhabitants and pilgrims, these paintings which were “perfect" and "easily portable and concise enough” were carried back home as ‘oriental’ or ‘exotic’ souvenirs by foreign travelers, colonial masters and Europeans who visited the city during this time. John Lockwood Kipling, the father of Rudyard Kipling, had in his collection some 233 paintings, which were donated by his son to the Victoria and Albert Museum in 1917. These paintings also found a market among the working classes and the merchants from different parts of the country. Consequently, the market for the Kalighat paintings flourished in the nineteenth century.

== Painting method ==
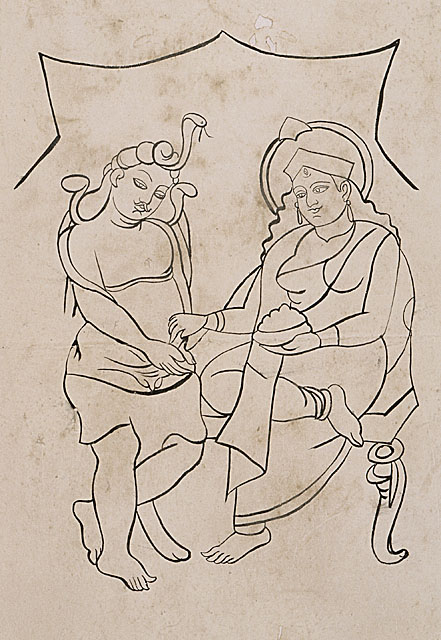
A painting in process: Annapurna dispensing food to Shiva.

The method of drawing was simple yet meticulous, every stage definite and clearly defined, and the entire creative endeavour was managed by the family unit, similar to an assembly line production system. Mukul Dey describes the process in detail: "One artist would [be] in the beginning, copy in pencil the outline from an original model sketch, and another would do the modeling, depicting the flesh and muscles in lighter and darker shades. Then a third member of the family would put in the proper colours in different parts of the body and the background, and last of all the outlines and finish would be done in lamp black". The colours were mixed with gum and ground on a round stone using granite mullers, while the brushes were made from goat's tail or squirrel fur. Shading to indicate volume was achieved through a wash of colour from the dark shades on the outer periphery to the lighter central areas, while three-quarter profiles were also experimented with besides the more commonly portrayed front and side profile faces.

A variety of colours have been used in these paintings starting from water-based colours to opaque-based pigments. The shades ranged from blue, indigo, yellow, green, carbon black, etc. Silver and golden were used for ornaments and in jewellery, while colloidal tin was used extensively to imitate the surface lustre of jewels and pearls. These colours were extracted from a variety of natural substances; for example the Aparajita flower was used to produce the blue colour, yellow came from turmeric root, and black was made with soot obtained from burning oil lamps. Imported factory-made water colours from Britain later substituted home-made colours, saving both time and effort. Gum made from the bel fruit, and sometimes crushed tamarind seeds, was used for binding.

Art collector Ajit Ghose, who provided one of the earliest descriptions of these paintings, noted: "The drawing is made with one long bold sweep of the brush in which not the faintest suspicion of even a momentary indecision, not the slightest tremor, can be detected. Often the line takes in the whole figure in such a way that it defies you to say where the artist's brush first touched the paper or where it finished the work..." Ghose, who was impressed by the "exquisite freshness and spontaneity of conception and execution" of these paintings, compared them to Chinese calligraphy.

During this period, the British were strengthening their hold over the Indian territory, transforming themselves from merchants to the monarchs of the land, and this entailed a rapid Europeanisation of city's culture, intellectual sphere, and modes of life. It was during this time that these paintings attempted to create a specific Bengali identity in the colonial capital countering the European hegemony. The term "cosmopolitan folk culture" as coined by Milton Singer aptly describes these paintings, which were partly modified from their village predecessors, while partly assimilated into the new urban mass culture of the city.

== Themes ==
Kalighat paintings depicted a variety of religious and non-religious themes; while portrayals of the pantheon of Hindu deities were most common, especially Kali, the Kalighat artists also responded to events of the day, and painted contemporary events, recording in their pats, the scenes of life and society of Calcutta in that period. After migrating from rural areas, these painters recorded subjects that piqued their interest in their new urban environment.

=== Religious themes ===
Pilgrims often bought these artworks as souvenirs, so Hindu gods and goddesses where a major theme: Shiva, as Panchanan, or with Parvati, perched on Nandi or dancing with Sati's lifeless corpse; Lakshmi, either as Gajalakshmi, or in her usual form; Chandi as Durga, Kamalakameni & Mahishasuramardini. Other deities such as Kartikeya, Ganesha, Saraswati, etc., and Vaishnava themes like the various incarnations of Vishnu, scenes from Krishna's childhood days in Vrindavan, images of Radha, Balarama, and even Chaitanya Mahaprabhu populated these artworks. Carrying on the vestiges of the traditional Patachitra art, the Kalighat patuas represented with panache episodes from the two great Indian epics. Maxwell Sommerville, a Philadelphian publisher who travelled through Africa, the Middle East, Thailand, Europe, India and Burma from the 1860s onwards, observed the mystical traditions of these places, and collected artifacts, among which were 57 Kalighat paintings, almost all of which depicted Hindu gods and goddesses. Sommerville's collections now form a part of the collection at the University of Pennsylvania Museum of Archaeology and Anthropology.

Kalighat paintings: Religious themes

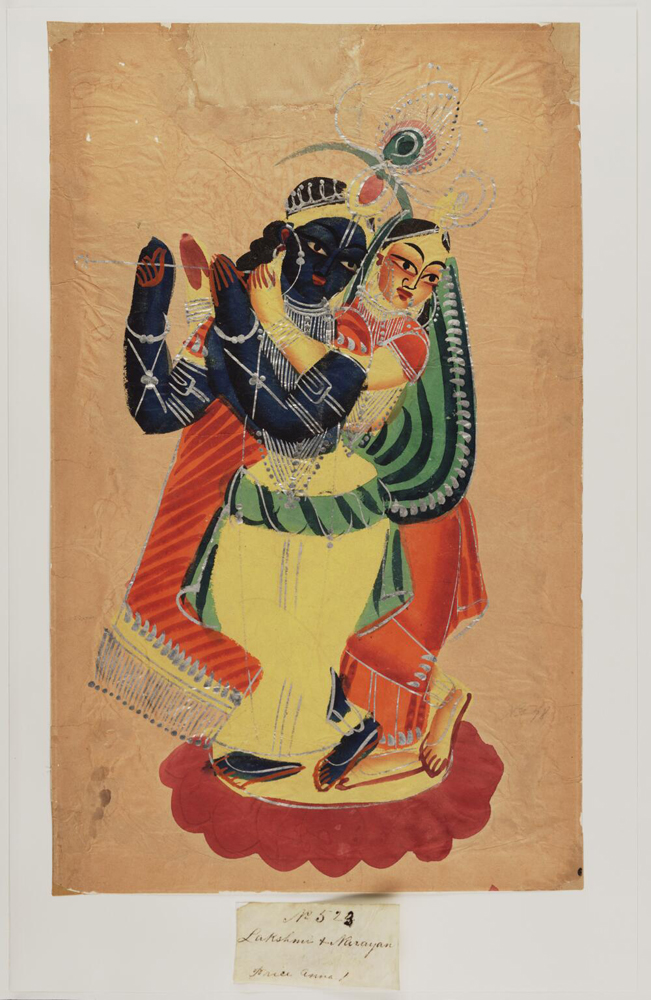
Radha and Krishna.

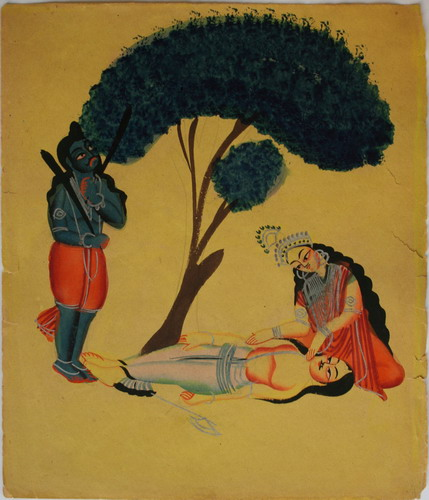
Savitri begs Yama not to take Satyavan, a scene from the Mahabharata.

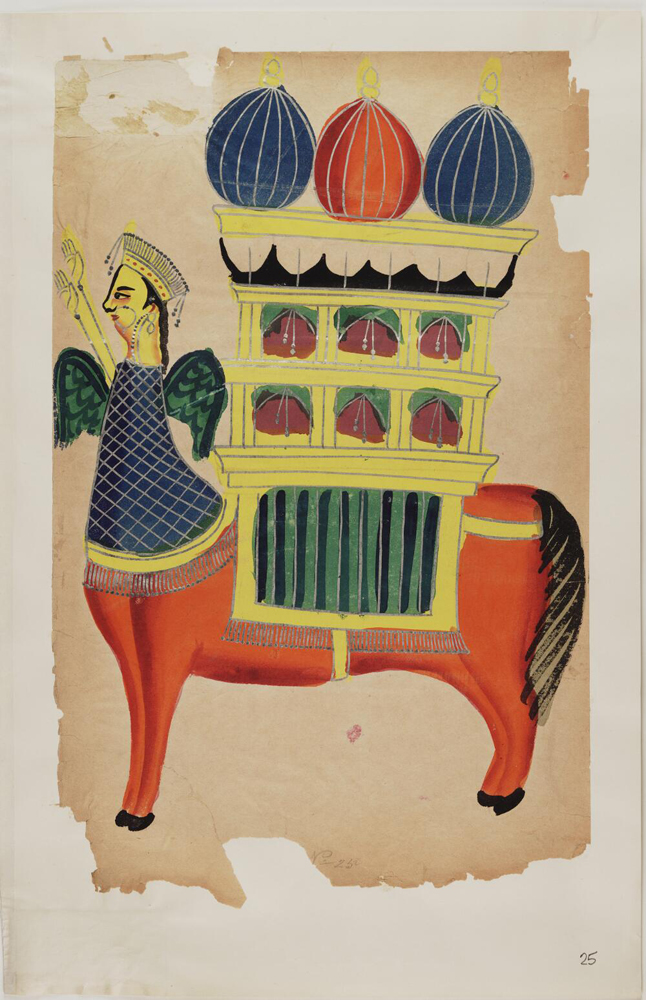
Carnival float for the Muslim holy day Muharram, in the form of Buraq, the beast on which Muhammad flew to heaven.

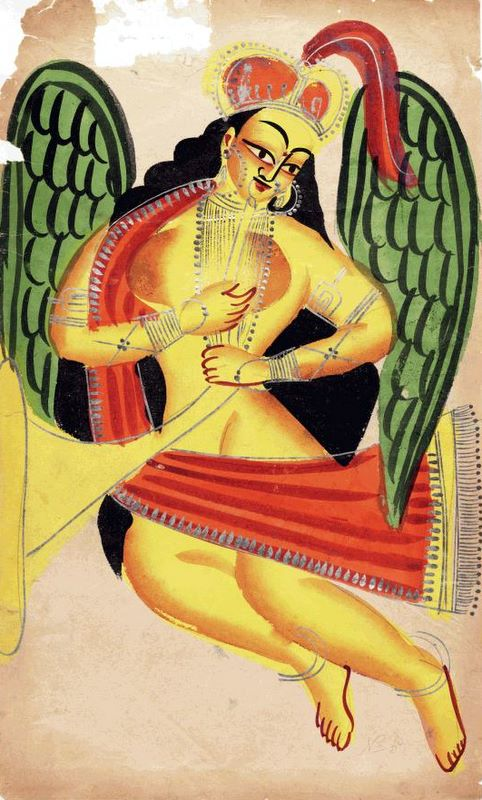
Peri, a fairy in the Persian tradition.

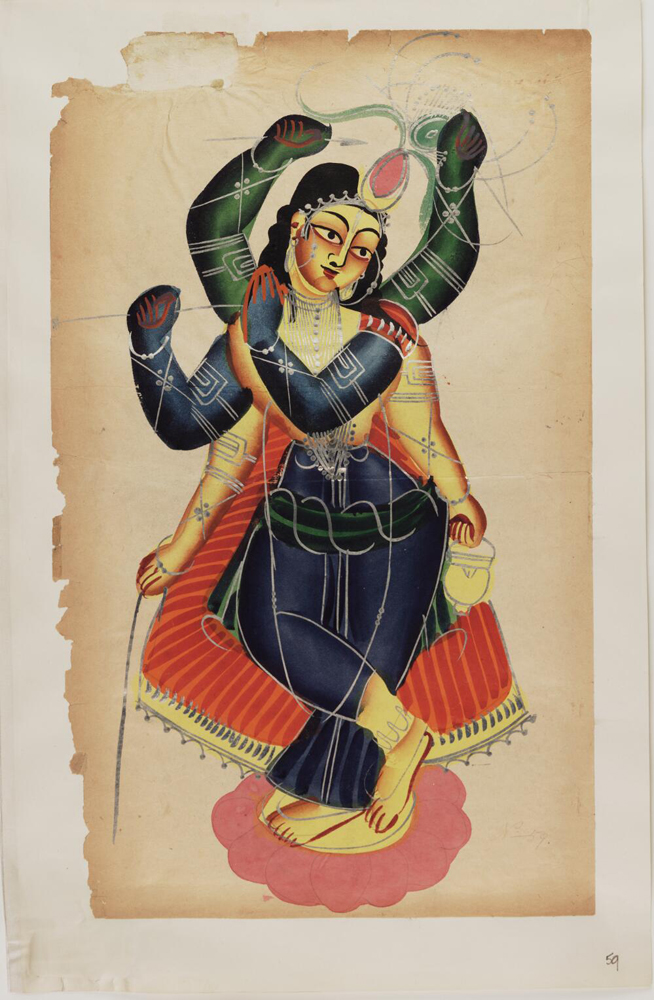
Shadbhuja Chaitanya, the six-armed form of Chaitanya Mahaprabhu.

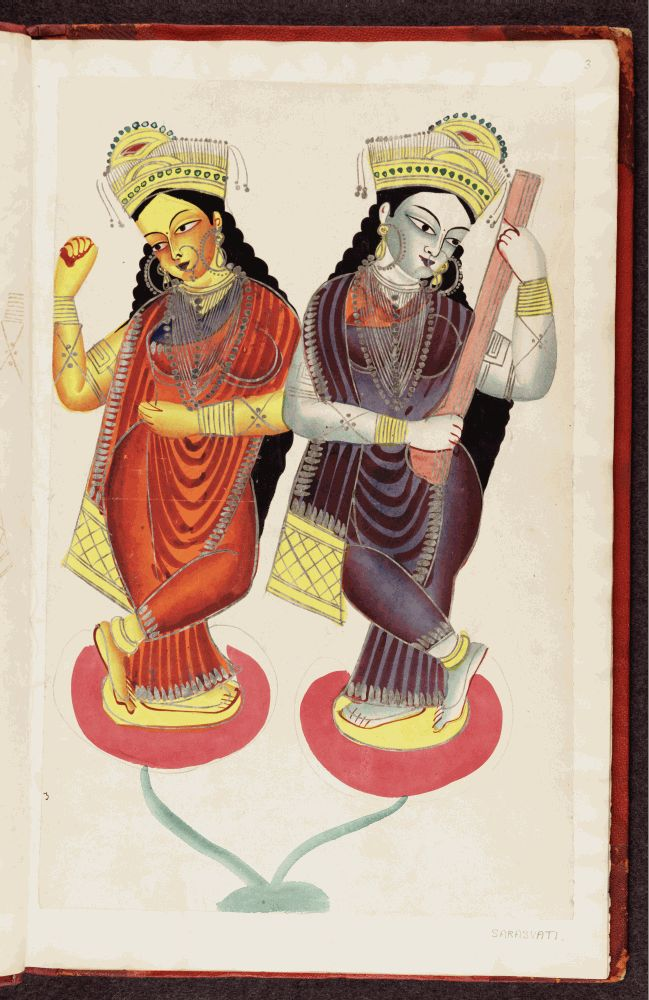
Lakshmi and Saraswati, goddesses of wealth and knowledge respectively.

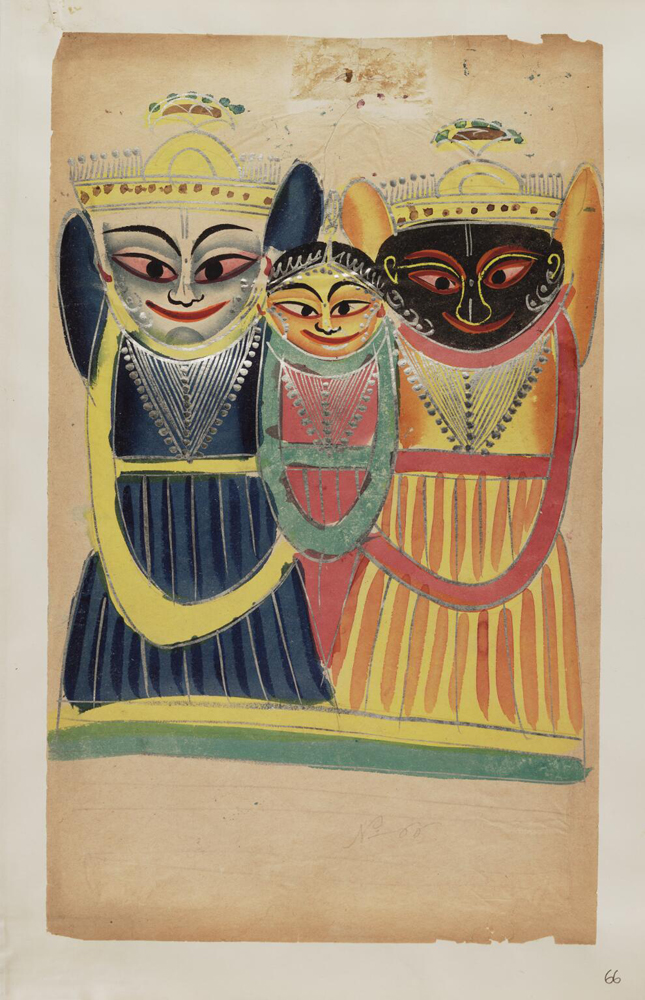
Jagannath with his siblings, Balabhadra and Subhadra.

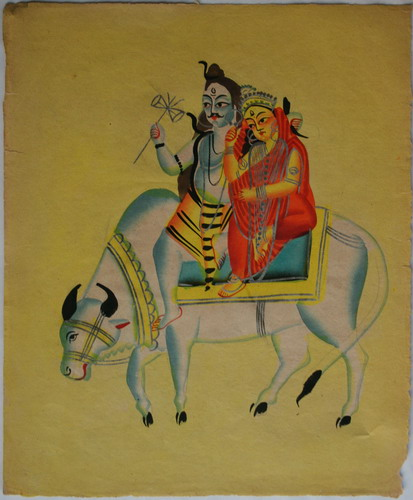
Shiva and Parvati on the bull Nandi.

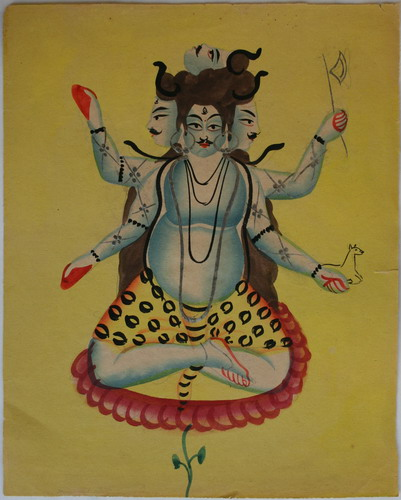
Shiva as Panchamukha.

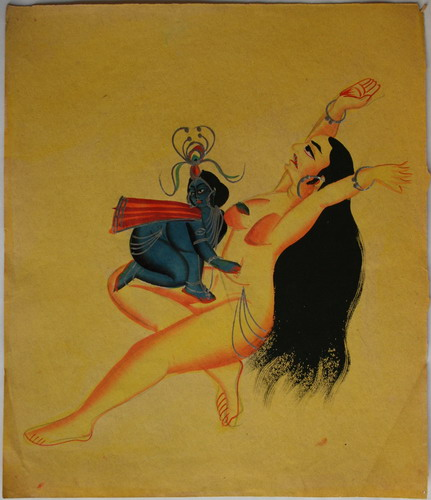
Krishna killing the demoness Putana.

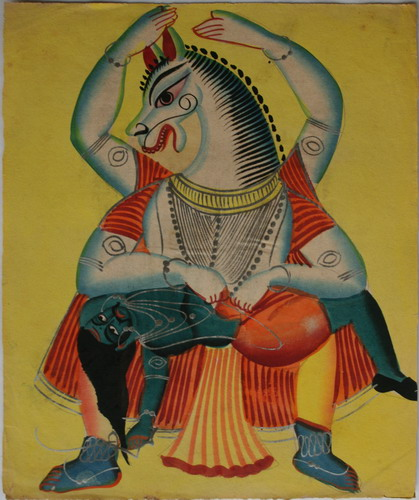
Narasimha, one of the ten avatars of Vishnu.

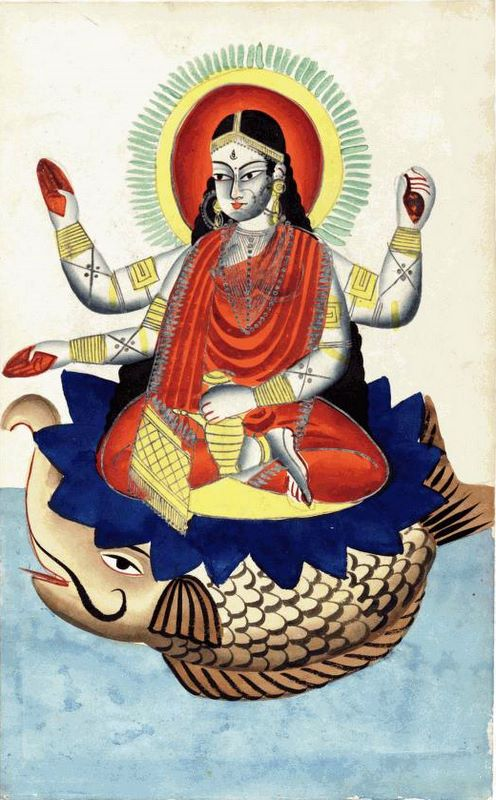
Goddess Ganga, personification of the river Ganges.

Interestingly, the portraits of these traditional deities have visible hints of the impact of British colonialism: Victorian crowns adorn the goddesses' heads, and they sit in the posture of English noblewomen, violins substitute for veenas, while heavy curtains like those of English playhouses formed the backgrounds. However, the Kalighat school would later be subjected to criticism for this very appropriate depiction of religious themes and figures, particularly from nationalist artists, collectors and elites, such as cultural anthropologist Gurusaday Dutt, who couldn't locate the Indianness, or the emotional and spiritual authenticity in these paintings. Dutt, who was also a civil servant, denounced these paintings, exclaiming:

One feels that something is missing; and that something is the inner spiritual motive or rasa.

Although growing around the site of a Hindu temple, the Kalighat patuas also depicted subjects and icons from other religions including Christianity and Islam. A.N. Sarkar and C. Mackay notes "The painters sought to capture all slices of the truly cosmopolitan market available to them."

=== Non-religious themes ===
Domestic pets, fishes such as rui, shol, etc., and even birds, prawns and lobsters were represented by the Kalighat artists, probably influenced by the Mughal painting and contemporary British painters. Contemporary events, literary scenes from contemporary novels, popular proverbs, and genre scenes were also frequently drawn. The artists depicted the English rulers, the Bengali babus, the idiosyncrasies of the middle and upper classes, domestic clashes and the changing positions and status of women, as well as the servant classes, including prostitutes and itinerant mendicants, transforming their canvas frames from mere religious folk paintings to mediums of social reflection and critique.

Kalighat paintings: Non-religious themes

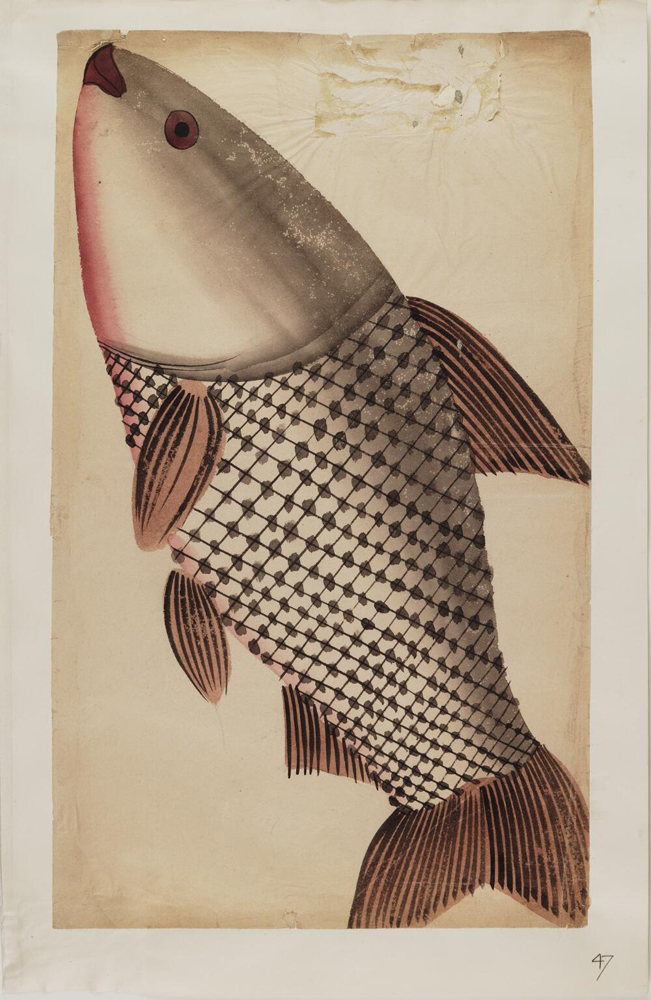
Rui fish.

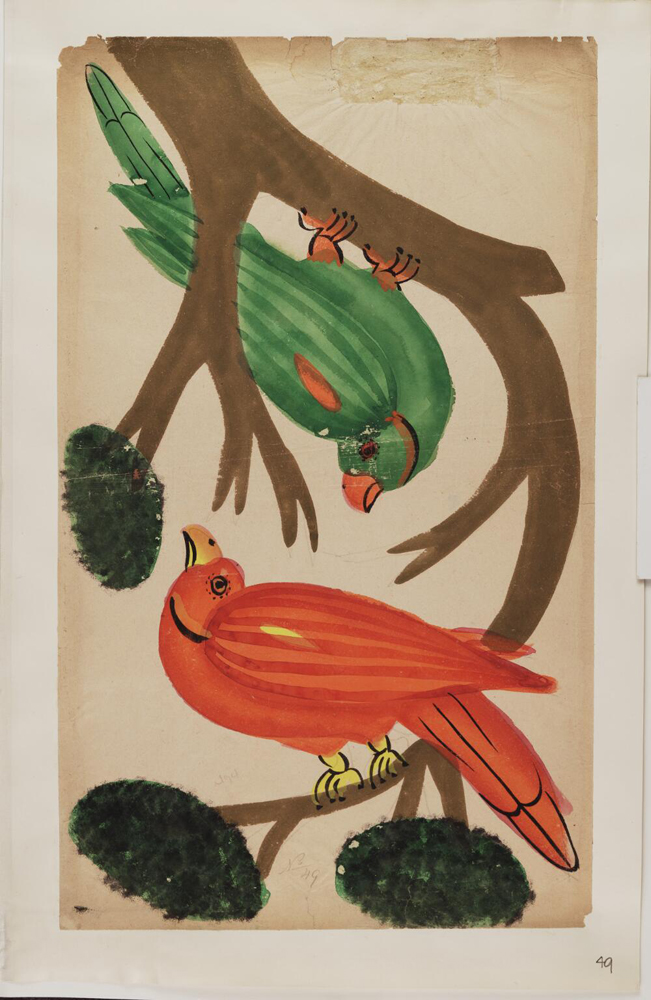
Hiramohan Birds.

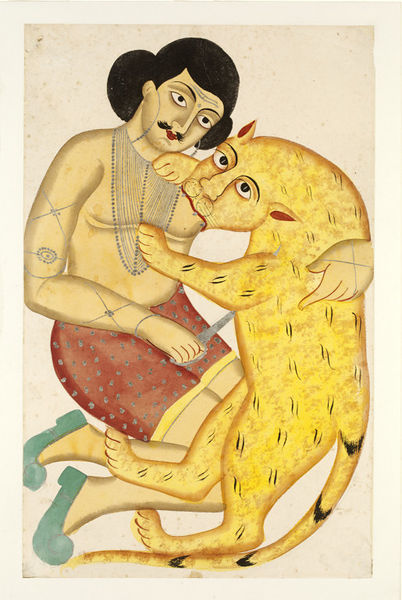
Shyamakanta wrestling with a Bengal tiger.

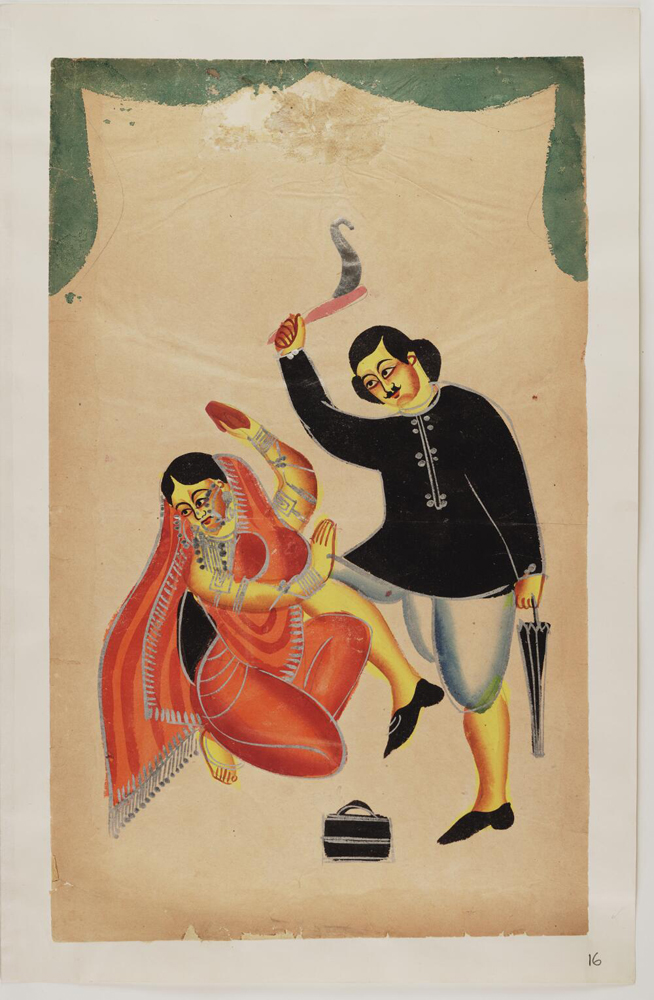
Moments before the fatal blow, a scene from the Tarakeshwar affair.

Rani Lakshmi Bai of Jhansi, one of the foremost leaders of the 1857 Sepoy Mutiny.

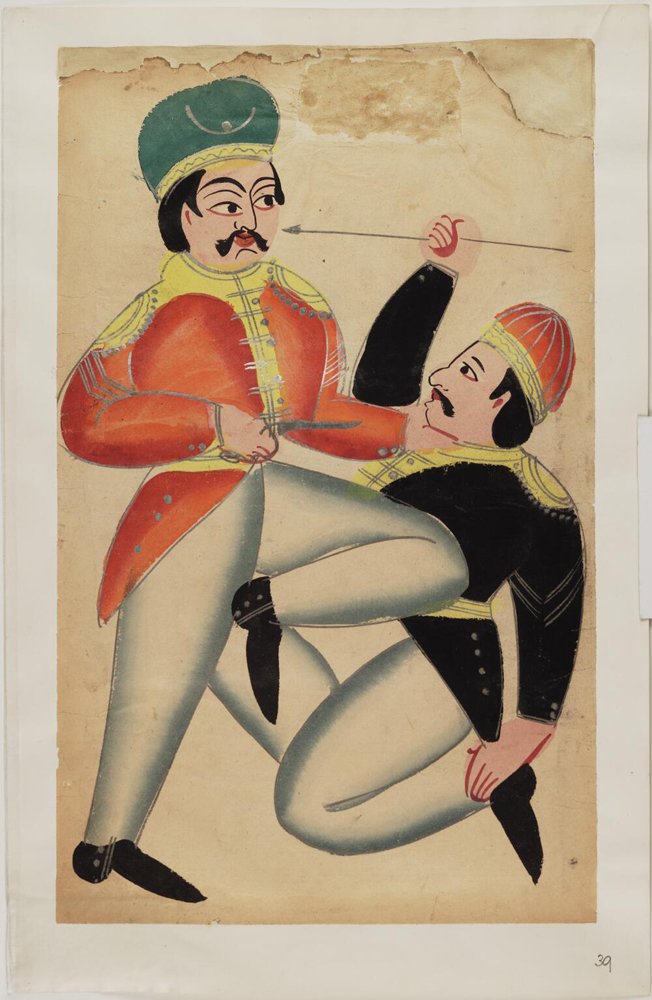
A British company master in a duet with supposedly a native.

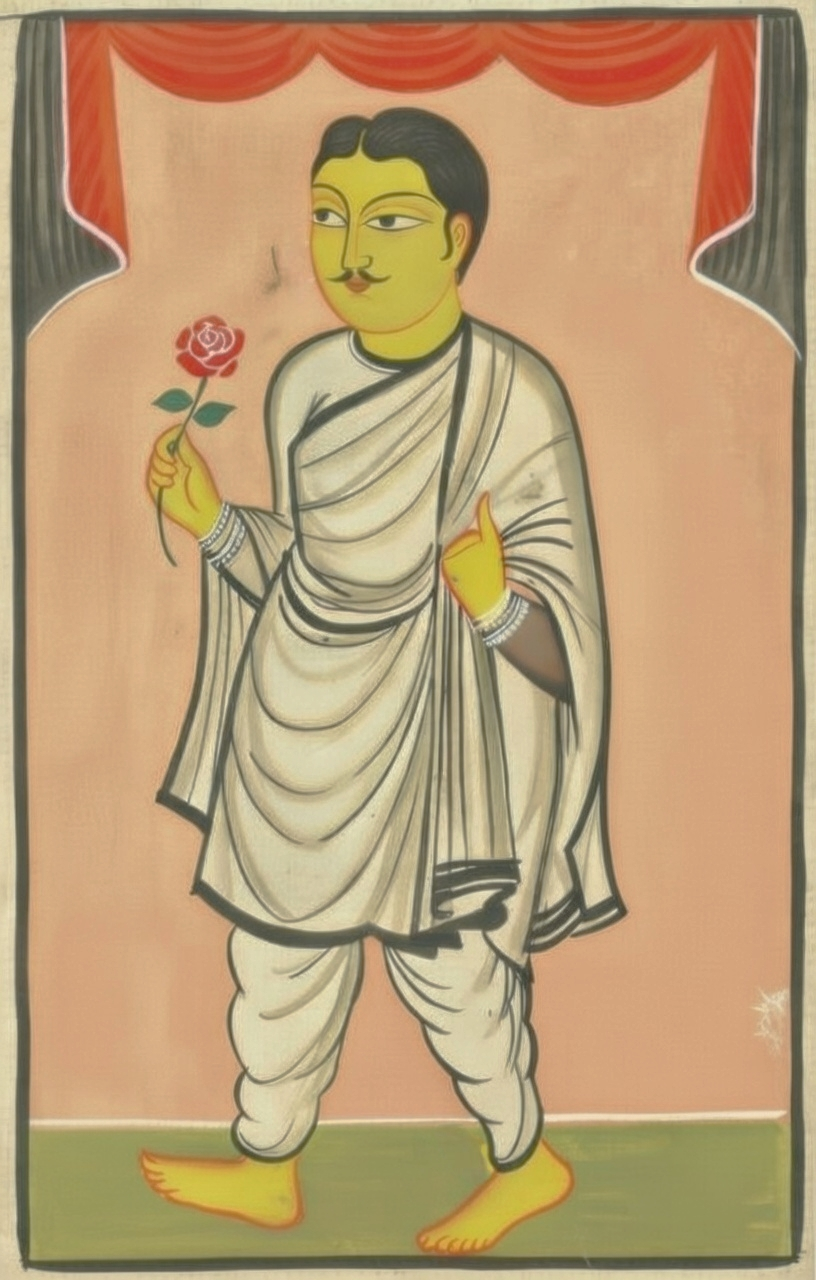
Patachitra of Maharaja Virendra Mohan Dar c. 1929

Kalighat folk art, as Mukul Dey observes, did not remain disjointed from life. In fact, "events of burning interest, social oddities and idiosyncracies, follies and foibles of people, and hypocrisies and meanness-these never escaped the Kalighat painters", who were extremely "keen observers of life, with a grim sense of humour", and often depicted the social evils and immoralities practiced by the wealthy zamindars and the flamboyant babus in the form of repulsive caricatures that would caution the ordinary citizens from indulging in such pleasures. The Kalighat artists critiqued the rising nouveau-riche 'babu culture' of the late eighteenth century by caricaturing upper-class, westernised, pretentious Bengali men in their typical style of the dhoti, pleated and held in one hand, while chewing betel leaves or smoking the hookah, their hair nicely oiled as they were shown flirting with a courtesan.

Shyamakanta Banerjee, who earned his fame during the 1890s for wrestling with tigers in the circus ring, captured the imagination of these artists and found his way into the chouko pats, where his heroic and brave deeds were often represented. The Tarakeshwar murder case that became a public scandal in Calcutta being widely discussed by the common masses was also portrayed by the Kalighat artists. In this particular incident, in 1873, Nabinchandra Banerjee, after discovering his wife Elokeshi's affair with the chief priest of Tarakeshwar Shiva Temple, cut his wife's throat with a fish knife, or bonti. Nabin was sentenced to life imprisonment during the trial, while the priest was fined and incarcerated for 3 years. The Kalighat artists responded by producing scenes from the case details: Elokeshi and the priest's rendezvous at the temple; Elokeshi seeking Nabin's forgiveness; the gory scene of her murder by Nabin; the trial room scenes and the consequent imprisonment of the culprits were depicted in these paintings.

=== Representation of women ===
Kalighat paintings became an active medium of subversion through which the artists depicted what they observed. The figure of Kali, the most widely drawn in these paintings, suggests the "image of a woman who is imagined, unreal and beastlike". If these artists were capable of painting beasts in such mutated anthropomorphic forms, therefore, the representation of Babus and Bibis could be interpreted as a shift from the unreal to the real, where the Babu stands for the "beastly characteristics" while the Bibi is similar to Kali, the "deviant, yet powerful beastlike goddess". Therefore, the patuas who produced images of deities in the pre-colonial times, were now "subverting his expression" by painting Babu and Bibi figures. Anuja Mukherjee notes: "Bibi sometimes being a wife or a prostitute who was aggressively sexual, dominating and most importantly deviant matches the profile of the image of a deity [Kali] who facilitated the formation of the Kalighat style of paintings."

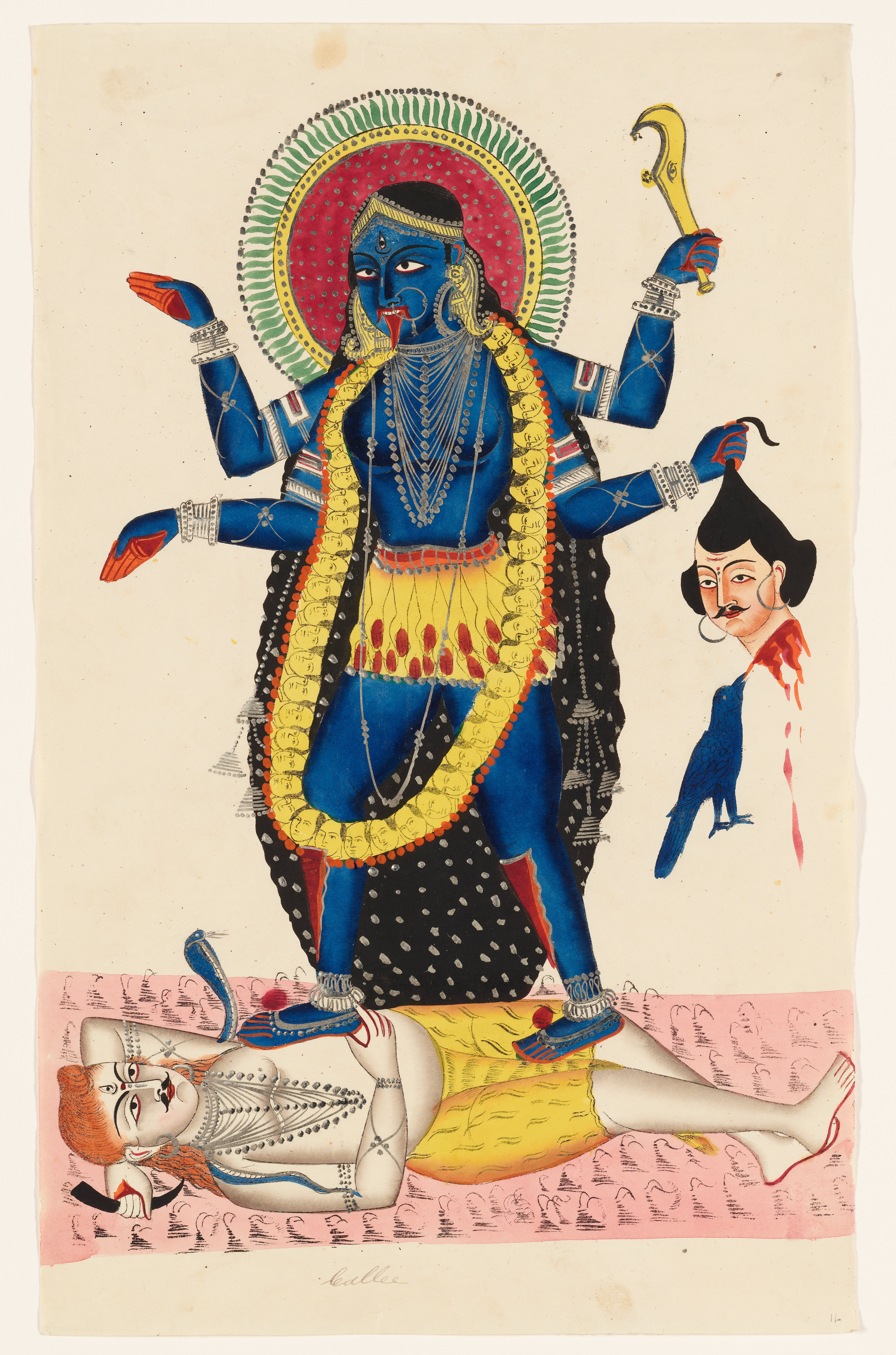
Kali, the deviant goddess, dancing on Shiva.

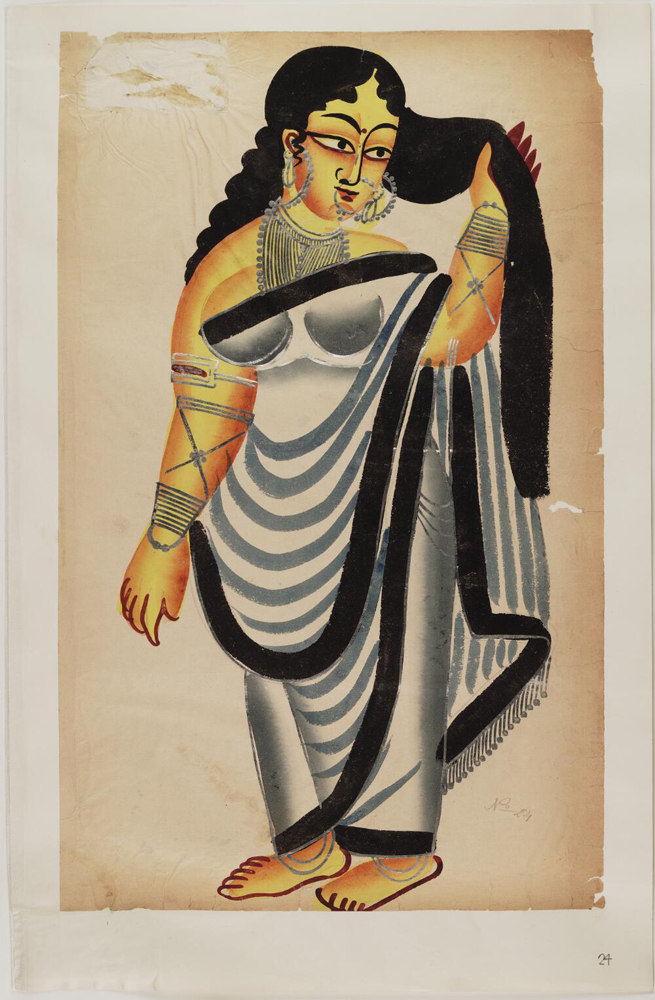
Bibi fixing her hair.

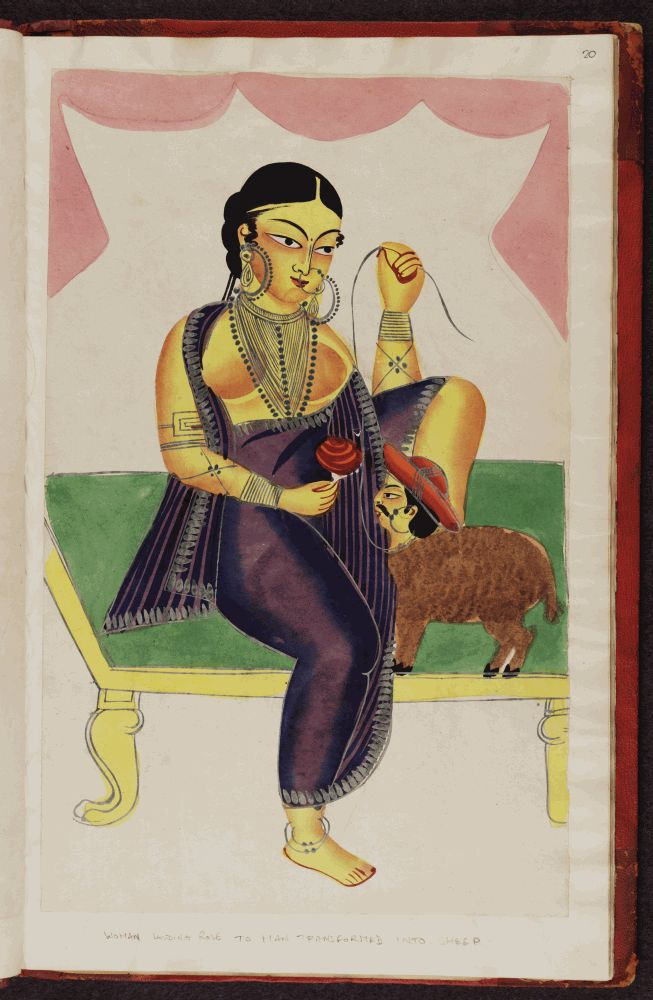
A courtesan/actress with her admirer. Note how the Babu, the admirer, is portrayed as a sheep.

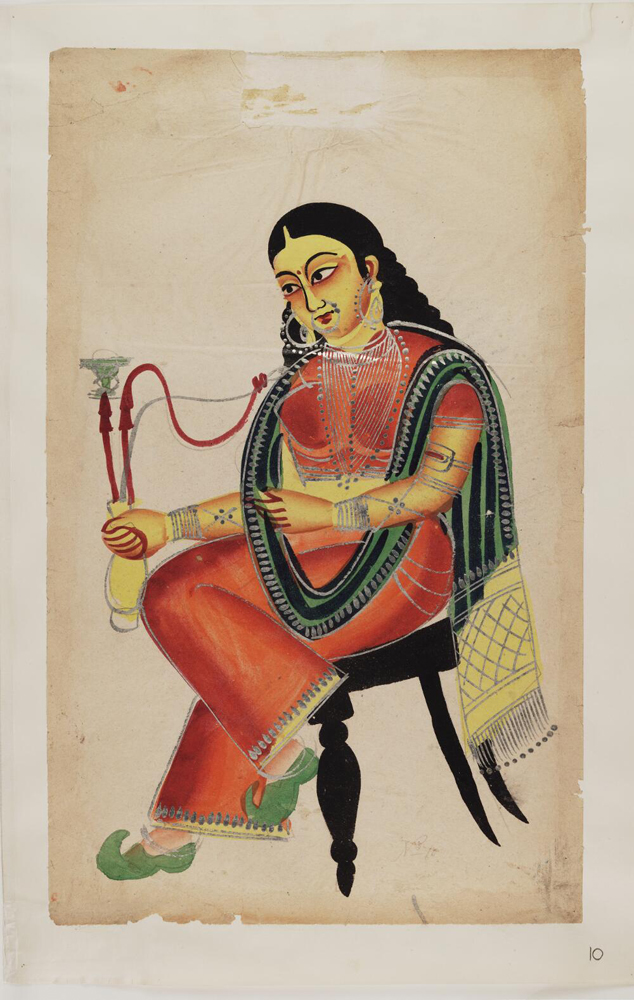
A woman, probably a courtesan, smoking a hookah.

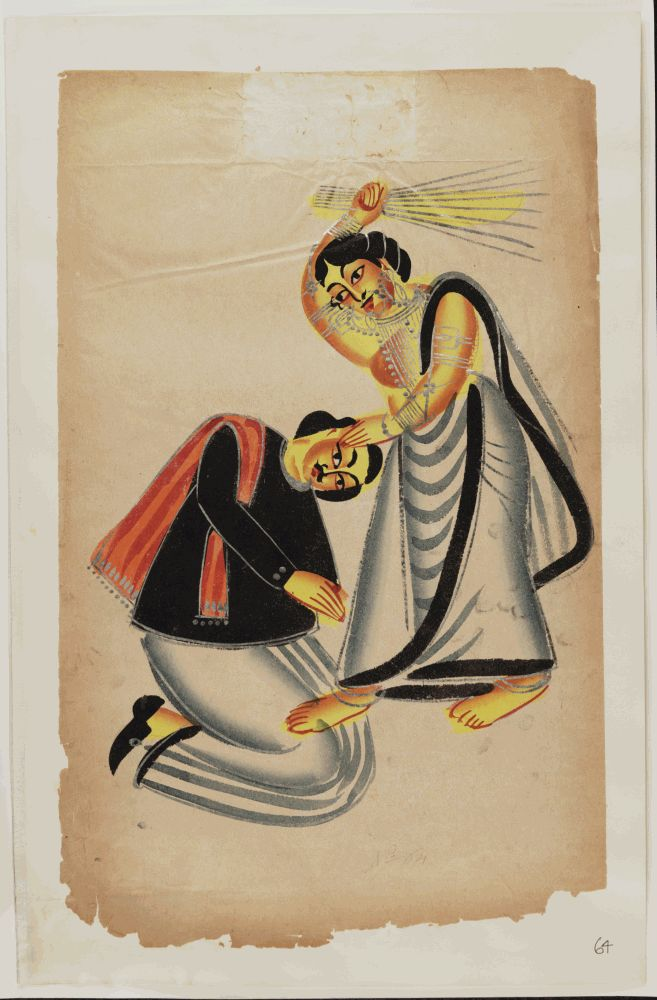
Bibi hitting the Babu with a broom, a reflection of the changing social relations of the middle-class.

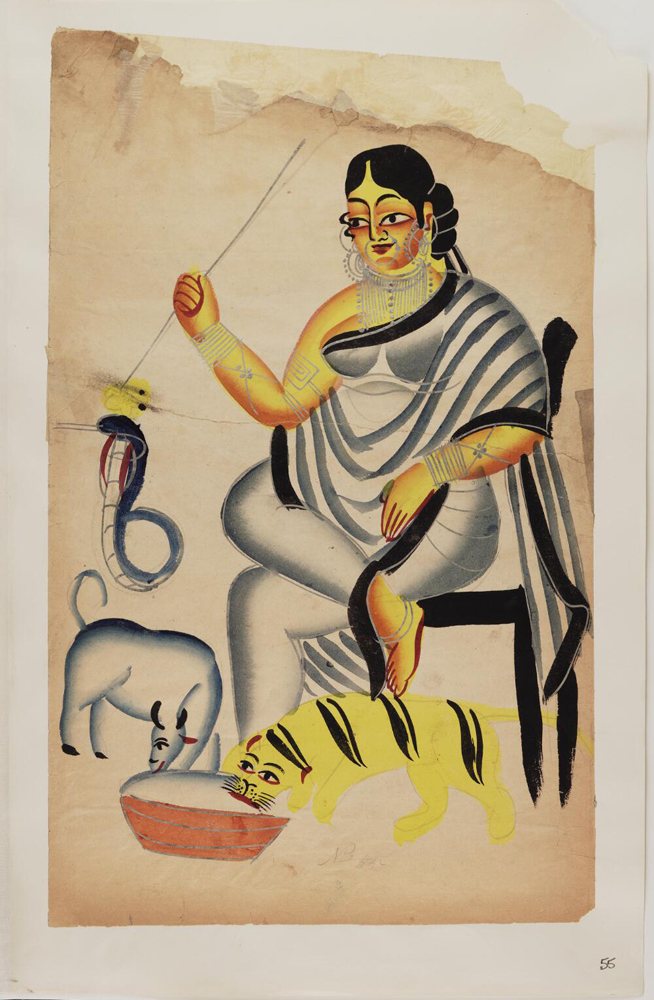
A woman feeding her pets. Perhaps a commentary on the changing roles of women during the period. Note the different types of pets near her feet.

Nineteenth century Bengal saw the status of women being questioned, as women's education occupied the space of public discussion and elite women managed to access education, changing their status from mahila to bhadramahila. The patua responded to these changes, and through his pat brought out the several contradictions of this project of an elite nationalism. One of the reasons the Kalighat school faced negative sensationalism was because the "new woman", educated and supposed to fit into the social norms, didn't live up to her image in these paintings.

Mukherjee explains how the patua created "marked differences" in their representations of prostitutes and wives. Therefore, the folk artists were simultaneously portraying the metropolitan women subjected to these changes, while similar expectations were being imposed on the patua, not to let his surroundings interfere with his work despite the change in them. The Babu and Bibi figures became recurring tropes in these paintings, to the extent that they served journalistic purposes such as in the Elokeshi scandal. Here, Mukherjee makes an interesting observation, establishing the subversion achieved by the patuas through the figure of the Babus and Bibis, and the eventual decline of the school, she says: "When we think of how an art form died out, it is essential to realise the fluidity of an entire form practiced by at least a few hundred must have struck a chord that had to be silenced eventually but entirely". The Kalighat paintings became the platform through which the artists portrayed his self, the other and the contradictions that the self and the other inhabited, and all this was achieved through the language of folk art, represented in the Babu-Bibi paintings.

== Truly indigenous or Western influenced? ==
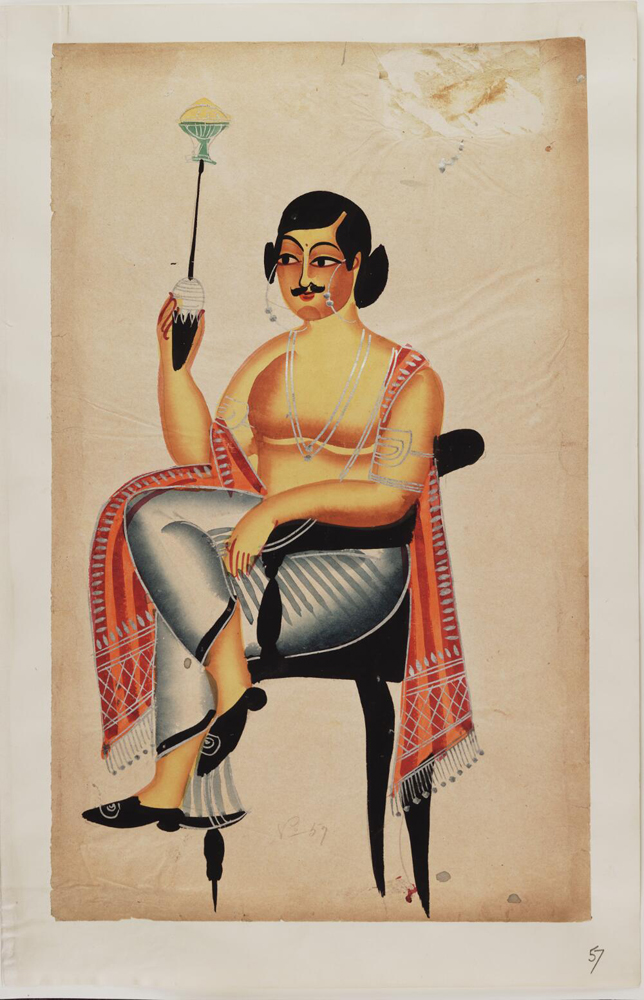
A Babu with a hookah. Note the features of this painting - for Archer these features represented a Western influence, while other critics like Ajit Ghose defended the Kalighat School as a truly indigenous style.

Scholars are divided on whether the school represents an inherently indigenous art form, or has been influenced by European styles. In his 1953 book, "Bazaar Paintings of Calcutta: The Style of Kalighat", art historian and curator W.G. Archer argues that these Kalighat paintings were produced as a result of the Western influence on the immigrant patuas. Archer noted the use of folio-sized paper-base instead of traditional cloth; the use of watercolour in rendering the background plain and simple so as to focus on the central figure more prominently; the depiction of urban themes; the particular method of shading, which later Jyotindra Jain explained as bold chiaroscuro and the starting phase of highlighting three dimensional figures; and how some artists signed their works following the Western model of claiming authorship — to reach his conclusion. This was also guided by his Eurocentric vision, and the discourse of orientalism, which held colonial culture superior to Indian art and values.

Ajit Ghose, on the other hand, emphasized on the view that the paintings represented a ‘truly indigenous Kalighat style’, while accepting European influence:

"Such a school, at once so Indian and yet so modern, compels us to face some unexpected facts, for, despite its marked dissimilarity from British art of the eighteenth and nineteenth centuries, the style was actually a by-product of the British connection and can only be understood against the background."

Archer pointed out how the Kalighat painters adopted the particular style of shading, left the background blank, and used watercolours, after European paintings reached the bazaars of Calcutta and were being sold there during the late eighteenth century. Archer argued, citing examples from Wellesley's folio, that the background style was influenced by British natural history paintings.

But from a mass production perspective, keeping the background simple was an economic choice that kalighat painters made often. Simple backgrounds existed prior to colonial rule, and can be spotted in the Bhagavata manuscripts of the seventeenth-century, the eighteenth century Ramacharitmanas scripts, scroll paintings, and Rajput art. The shift from paper to cloth, as well as from the scroll-narrative format to a single-page layout was perhaps motivated by the need to increase the pace of production. As historian B.N. Mukherjee elaborates, the use of watercolours was also not a unique feature - the artists of the kalighat pat had always used water to dilute the paints they manufactured themselves. Sumanta Banerjee, the art historian, challenges Archer's point regarding the use of shading — suggesting that these artists derived the idea of depth, and their knowledge of three dimensional figures, from clay modelling and by painting clay figures of deities. It is highly improbable that these kalighat artists had any direct contact with the ruling elites, which further problematises Archer's claims. In fact, these artists were very much the outsiders, and their art documented perhaps for the first time, the initial instances of deteriorating influence of the British rule on Indian life, society and culture. Furthermore, the signed pats from which Archer made his observations were personally collected by him from particular artists, the larger number of existing Kalighat pats remain unsigned and anonymous which once again raises questions about Archer's observations.

However, Archer's notions gained currency among a large number of scholars who classified the paintings as Anglo-Indian, but others, such as A.N. Sarkar and C. Mackay believed: "The Kalighat school of painting is perhaps the first school of painting in India that is truly modern as well as popular. With their bold simplifications, strong lines, vibrant colours and visual rhythm, these paintings have a surprising affinity to modern art." Tapati Guha-Thakurta agrees claiming that the Kalighat school should be celebrated as being authentically Indian. The artists were not just modifying the aesthetics that they had inherited from their predecessors, but they were also maintaining in their own way the traditional artform while living in a colonial urban location.

The Kalighat paintings which depicted contemporary events with satirical humour, inspired many students, studying in imperialist art schools, to turn to indigenous art forms. Jamini Roy remains a popular example. Banerjee explains the relationship between Kalighat paintings and anti-colonial struggles, following Fanon's arguments that "anti-imperial struggles revitalise the culture and traditions of indigenous classes in colonial settings—as native artists who once used to relate ‘inter episodes’ start bringing them alive with modifications to describe the new sociocultural context, modernising legends, naming heroes and their weapons."

== Decline ==
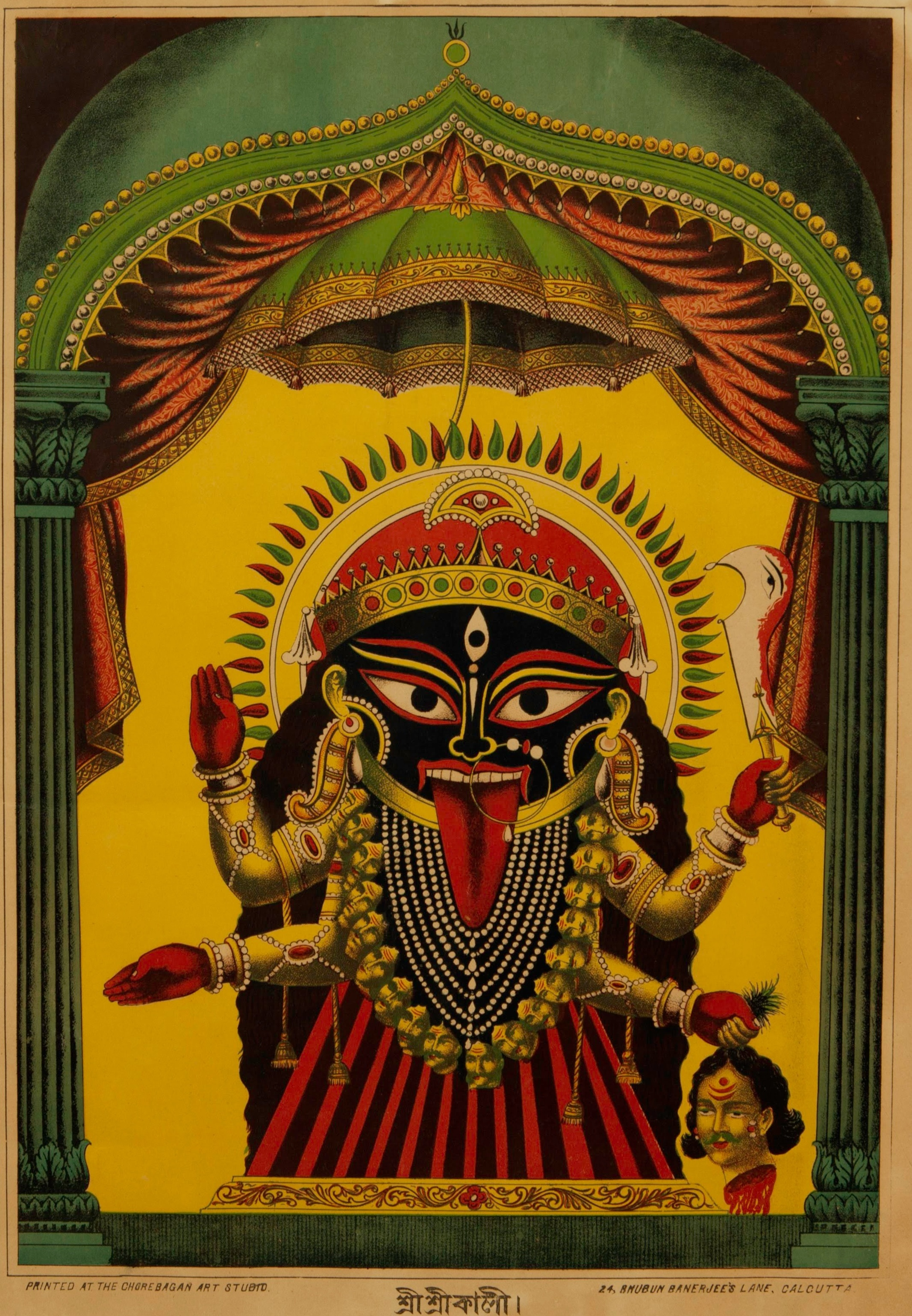
A late-19th-century chromolithograph of Goddess Kali, produced by the Chore Bagan Art Studio. Note the similarities between this image and the Kalighat paintings of Kali. Such cheap prints led to the decline of the Kalighat School.

The fame and popularity of Kalighat paintings diminished gradually during the initial decades of the early 20th century onwards, as cheap printed reproductions of the themes of Kalighat infiltrated the markets. These cheap chromolithographs annihilated the hand-crafted school, paralysed the production, and extinguished the artistic skill and creative impulse of the painters and they started migrating to other employment sectors, or back to the villages from which their ancestors had come.

Mukul Dey commented: “Cheap oleographs of all sorts from Germany and from Bombay now take the field, some of them blatant imitations of Kalighat paintings”. Dey states: “When German traders found that these pictures had a very great sale throughout the country—for they were sold in thousands all over India—they imitated them and sent back glazed and coloured lithographed copies which flooded the country and drowned the original hand-painted pictures.”

Unable to face the challenges of the machine-made productions, which were cheaper than their hand-made drawings and paintings, the children of these artists abandoned the practice and took up other professions. W.G. Archer located the final phase of Kalighat school somewhere around 1930.

Categorising the paintings in the Victoria and Albert Museum, Suhasini Sinha has developed a chronology of three broad phases which could be applied to Kalighat painting school to understand their development and decline. Sinha understands the Phase I as being around 1800 and 1850 characterised by the origins of the school and the development of its unique features; the second Phase was somewhere around 1850 to 1890 which saw variations in style, form and colour scheme and the Kalighat painting reaching its finesse; the third and the final phase Sinha situated between 1900 and 1930 which denotes the steady decline of the school due to the onslaught of the lithographs.

Today the painting is no longer practiced as it was done in the past, though in some rural pockets of Bengal, particularly in Medinipur and Birbhum, the tradition is kept alive by contemporary artists such as Anwar Chitrakar who continue the use of organic dyes, like the 19th century patuas, to depict a mixture of secular and religious themes. Dey observed: “The old art has gone forever; the pictures are now finding their homes in museums and in the collections of a few art lovers”.

== Jamini Roy and the Kalighat School ==
Jamini Roy and Kalighat Paintings

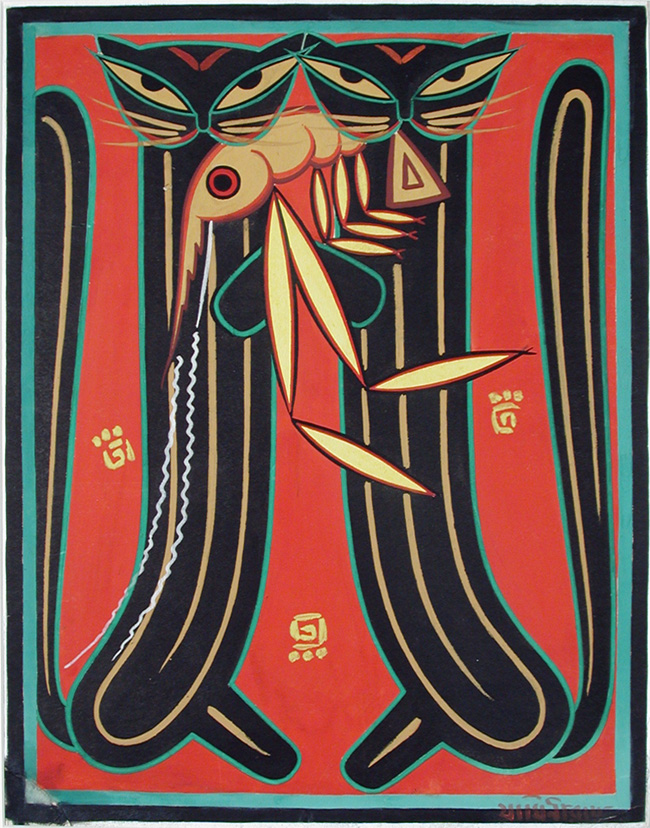
Two cats holding a large prawn, Jamini Roy.

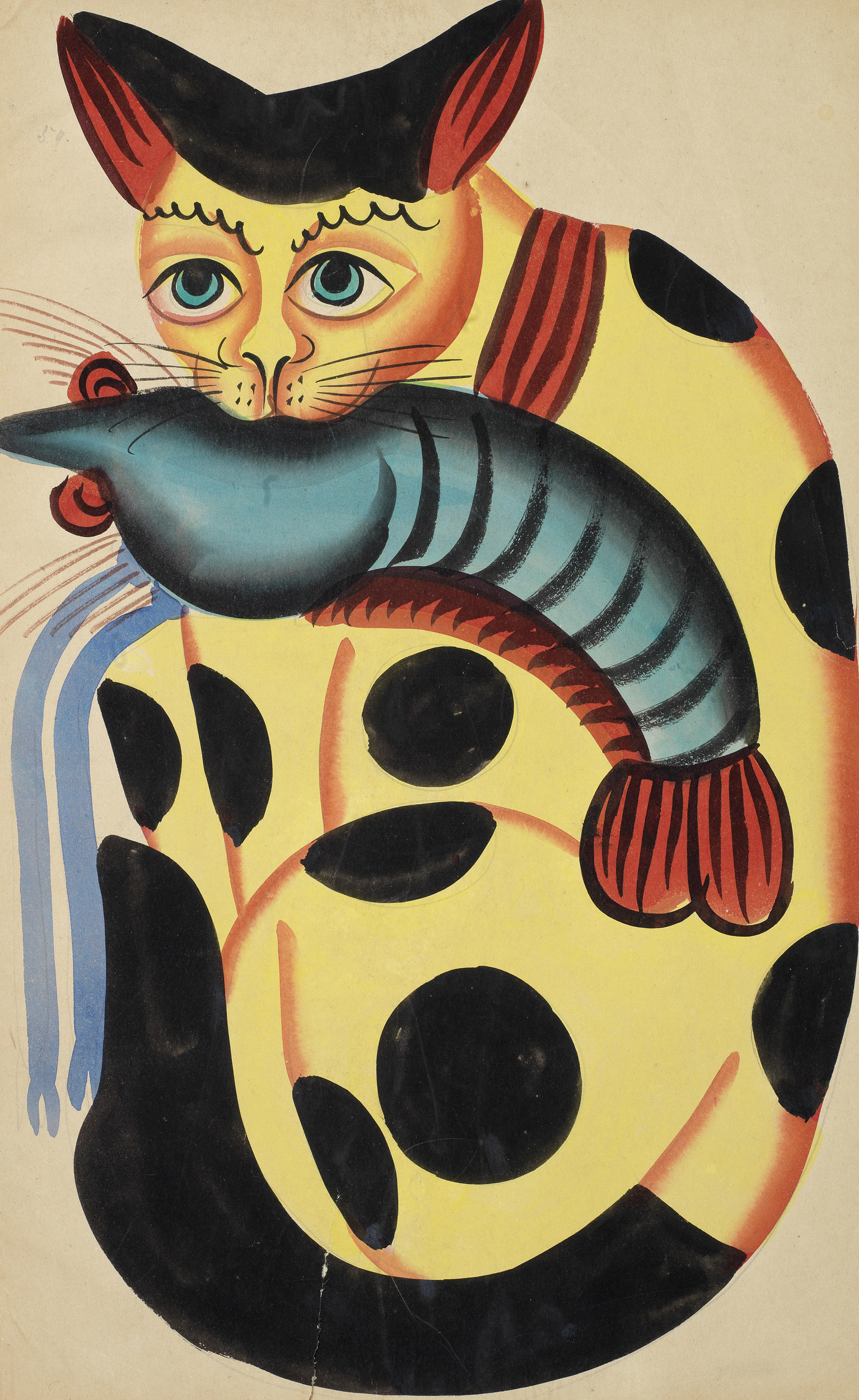
Cat stealing prawn, Kalighat Painting.

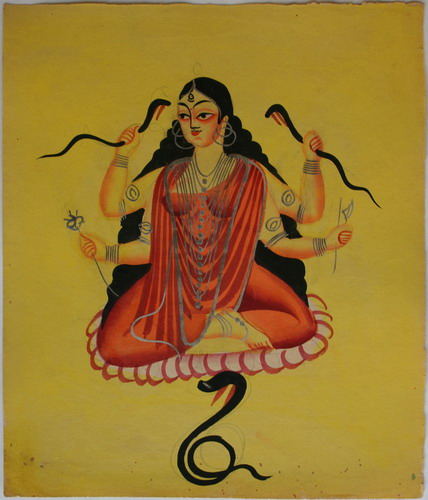
Manasa with Snakes, Kalighat School. The eyes of the figures are disengaging.

These folk artists, residing in the city, painted the plight of the metropolitan beings, while Jamini Roy would take the folk back to its roots by portraying them from his specific class position. Roy, in his attempt to create the three women and Janani image, which by his time had become popular, acknowledged the debt of learning from Kalighat art, but "Roy rejected the Kalighat artists for having lost the rural ideal when they moved to Calcutta to serve an urban population". For Anuja Mukherjee, Roy was able to problematize the need to cater to a population which largely differed from the rural pristine exotic, and "Jamini Roy's efforts was to make the paintings local and national", and therefore, as he strived to hail back to the roots to undo the "hegemony of metropolitan on art", he ended up outdoing the same strata of the artisans he was working for.

Roy's language of nationalism was the exact preservation of the idyllic rural image, starkly in contrast to the migrated artisans who witnessed their immediate surroundings and reflected them on their pats. By employing motifs such as hut, tree, alpona, etc., Roy displaced the metropolitan paintings to the rural. Therefore, his idiom was apparently "confined to aesthetic parallelism. So it never rose to any degree of authenticity; it never had the earthiness and the verve (or sly humour) of its close folk prototypes, whether those of Kalighat or Puri". Bishnu Dey highlights how Roy's paintings were static as compared to the more vivacious and energetic Kalighat Pats, because of Roy's inability to understand the contemporary problems which the Patuas represented with a flair. In this process, Roy's paintings are stripped off the humour and the power of the female forms which are intrinsic features of the Kalighat school.

Jamini Roy, the artist's signature.

The most "lucrative motif" that Roy adapted was that of the eye, as Mukherjee notes, "and it was the difference in the painting of the eyes that accounted for the divide in popularity". Roy's figures have eyes which connect with the viewer, whereas in Kalighat paintings the eyes are self-engaged. Mukherjee explains: "What I am trying to say is that the women, the cat, durga, ganesh and even asura stares back at the viewer with a dead pan expression, while the observed in the Kalighat paintings simply disengage themselves from the viewer". According to her, this helps us to understand how the elites viewed the subaltern in the nineteenth century. Therefore, the drawing of the eyes is a conscious choice made by the patuas who felt the elites, whom they represented in their pats, didn't look back at the subaltern - hence, their gaze is self-engaged; representing how deeply the elites were concerned with carving their own new identity that they didn't attempt to connect with the subaltern painters. Thus, through Roy and his body of art we understand the importance of connecting with the subaltern.

Here it is important to remember that art is derived, it is not created in vacuum, and Roy essentially overlooked this aspect in his attempt to create a dominant style to "preserve and therefore desexualise the body of folk by transforming it into spiritual". Sumanta Banerjee's idea of obscenity and folk culture helps us to see how Jamini Roy significantly changed the image of that which he was taking from, and his indebtedness therefore exists not for folk art itself, but for the imagination of folk art.

== Kalighat paintings in museum collections ==
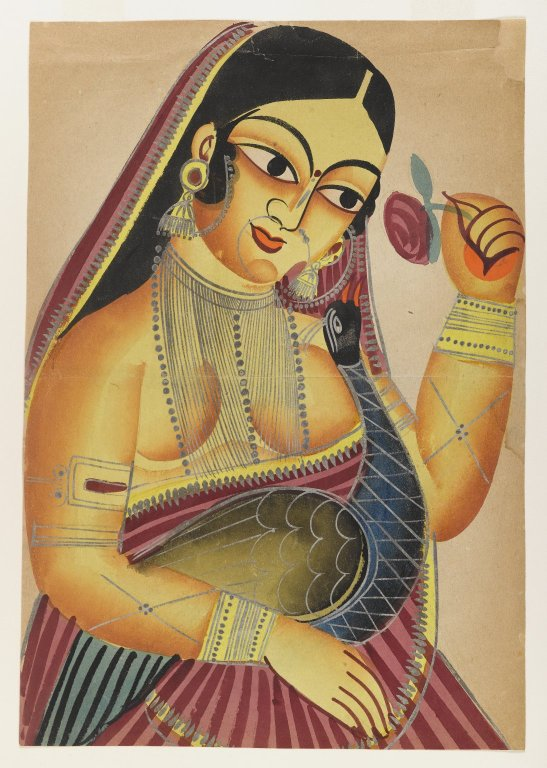
A lady holding a rose and a peacock. From the Brooklyn Museum.

This process of collecting Kalighat paintings for museums began in the early 20th century when these Kalighat pats were elevated to the status of “art” validated by a certain Modernist perspective, which was attracted to the school's economy of representation, bold lines, and brevity of style. Interestingly, this upgrade in its status occurred as the living traditions of these paintings declined during the 1930s. Furthermore, the European scholars who eventually became the early curators of South Asian art saw Kalighat paintings as having the potential to be included in museum collections such as those in British Museum, and elsewhere. Stella Kramrisch has defended the inclusion of these paintings in the Philadelphia Museum’s collection, in her exhibition Unknown India, by drawing successful parallels between Kalighat and major modernist painters. She states:

“Kalighat paintings…and brush drawings are monumental in their presentation on an otherwise mostly blank page. Preceding the work of Matisse, some of the brush drawings prefigure it. Out of Indian tradition and impressions of Western painting, the “bazaar” painters, descendants of low-caste and hereditary craftsmen, created forms as valid as, and akin to, some of the later work by leading artists in the West.”

This gradual transformation from their previous role of “bazaar paintings”, sold as souvenirs in the markets to tourists and pilgrims, to ethnographic collections in museums, marked the Kalighat paintings’ entrance into the ‘domain of art’ which by the middle of the 19th century was defined as a creative, pure and spontaneous sphere marked by polished sensibility and expressive “genius”. Anthropologist Igor Kopytoff describes this transformation of the objects’ cultural biography as “usinguiarization”, and such art done by groups, he states, “bears the stamp of collective approval, channels the individual drive for singularization, and takes on the weight of cultural sacredness”.

Several museums around the world have Kalighat paintings in their collections. The Victoria and Albert Museum has the single largest collection, and the Bodleian Library in Oxford features 110 Kalighat paintings. The India Office Library, which is now under the British Library, has 17 paintings, while 25 paintings are in the National Museum of Wales in Cardiff, while in Prague the Naprstek Museum holds 26 pieces, the Pushkin Museum in Moscow has 62 pats, and the University of Pennsylvania Museum, Philadelphia has 57 artworks.

In India, the Indian Museum in Kolkata has 40 paintings in its collection, and the Victoria Memorial Hall in Kolkata houses 24 pieces, while the Gurusaday Museum features more than 70 paintings and drawings. Also, the Birla Academy of Art and Culture, the Ashutosh Museum, and Shantiniketan's Kala Bhavana are home to important collections of paintings.

== See also ==
- Indian painting
- Madhubani painting
- Bengal School of Art
- Mughal painting
- Arts of West Bengal
- Rajput painting
