= Channa village =

- Village
- Location in West Bengal, India Channa village (India)
- Coordinates: 23.33°N 87.73°E
- Country: India
- State: West Bengal
- District: Purba Bardhaman

Population (2011)
  - Total: 2,465

Languages
  - Official: Bengali, English
- Time zone: UTC+5:30 (IST)
- Website: purbabardhaman.gov.in

Channa is a village located in Galsi II CD Block in Bardhaman Sadar North subdivision of Purba Bardhaman district in West Bengal, India. It is famous for the ashram of Niralamba Swami, a famous saint.

== Geography ==
Channa is located in Khano Panchayat area of Galsi - II Block. It falls within the jurisdiction of Bardhaman Sadar North subdivision of Bardhaman district.

It is a village with an area of 556.12 Ha or 5.56 km^{2} approximately.

== Demographics ==
As per the 2011 Census of India Channa had a total population of 2,465 of which 1,209 (49%) were males and 1,256 (51%) were females. Population below 6 years was 327. The total number of literates in Channa was 1,083 (50.65% of the population over 6 years).

As of 2001 India census, Channa had a population of 2,152.Out of this, male population was 1,090 and female population was 1,062.Out of the total population, the Scheduled Caste population was 641 and Scheduled Tribe population was 1041.

== Education ==
According to 7th All India School Education Survey - 2003 and National Informatics Centre (Burdwan District Unit), Department of Information Technology, there are two Primary Schools in the village. These schools are Channa Charakdanga Adibasi F.P. School and Channa F.P.School.

== History ==
=== Niralamba Swami ===
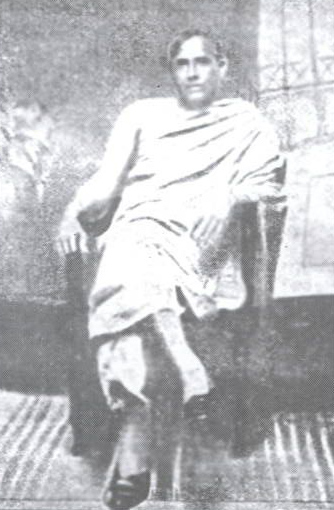
Niralamba Swami,the great yogi and freedom fighter

Channa village is famous for Jatindra Nath Banerjee (19 November 1877 – 5 September 1930) rechristened Niralamba Swami. Jatindra Nath Banerjee was a resident of this village. He was a disciple of Soham Swami.

Before becoming a famous Yogi and a popular Guru, Jatindra Nath Banerjee (later Niralamba Swami) took an active part in the Freedom Struggle movement of India. He passed FA from Burdwan College. In 1897,he joined Baroda army and became an associate of Aurobindo. He was the first to preach the adoption of revolutionary methods for attaining Independence. When Anushilan Samiti was established in 1902, he became one of its earliest members.

The repression of revolutionary activities in Bengal by the British Government and family pressure diverted his attention from political activities to spiritual matters. He left home and became a monk in search of knowledge of God. In Nainital he met Soham Swami, a great Yogi and Guru. Soham Swami was a disciple of Tibbetibaba, a great saint of India.

Jyotindranath Banerjee became an ascetic in 1907. He established an 'Ashram' at Channa, and lived there till his death on 5 September 1930. It was under Soham Swami, Jatindra Nath Banerjee reached great heights of spirituality. He was rechristened as Niralamba Swami and went on establish an Ashram at Channa. He became a very popular Guru and yogi of India. He was visited in his Ashram at Channa by the great saint Tibbetibaba and was taught some new spiritual practices by Tibbetibaba.

=== Dharmadas Rai ===
Dharmadas Rai, an important disciple of Tibbetibaba was a resident of this village. He had accompanied Tibbetibaba in his visit to Southern India.

=== Prajnanapada ===
Another famous person related with Channa village was Prajnanapada. He was popularly known as Swami Prajnanapada (1891–1974) of Channa Ashram (located at Channa village), was one of the eminent disciples of Niralamba Swami, the great yogi and Guru of India. He was born on 8 February 1891. He entered the life of Sannyasa and became Niralamba Swami's disciple in 1924-25 at Channa ashram. He was devoted follower of Advaita Vedanta philosophy and taught attainment of Self-knowledge using Jñāna Yoga method (the path of self-realisation using knowledge).

A unique method of teaching of Swami Prajnanapada was his establishment of one-to-one contact with his disciples and devotees instead of giving religious discourses.

=== Kamalakanta Bhattacharya ===
Another famous person of Channa was Kamalakanta Bhattacharya (West Bengal) ( Sadhak Kamalakanta) (c. 1769 - 1821). He was a famous devotee of goddess Kali( Bishalakshi). During his time there used to be regular kirtans( devotional songs) of Kali in Channa Bishalakshi temple located in the old burning ghat of the village.
