= Niralamba Swami =

Indian philosopher and nationalist

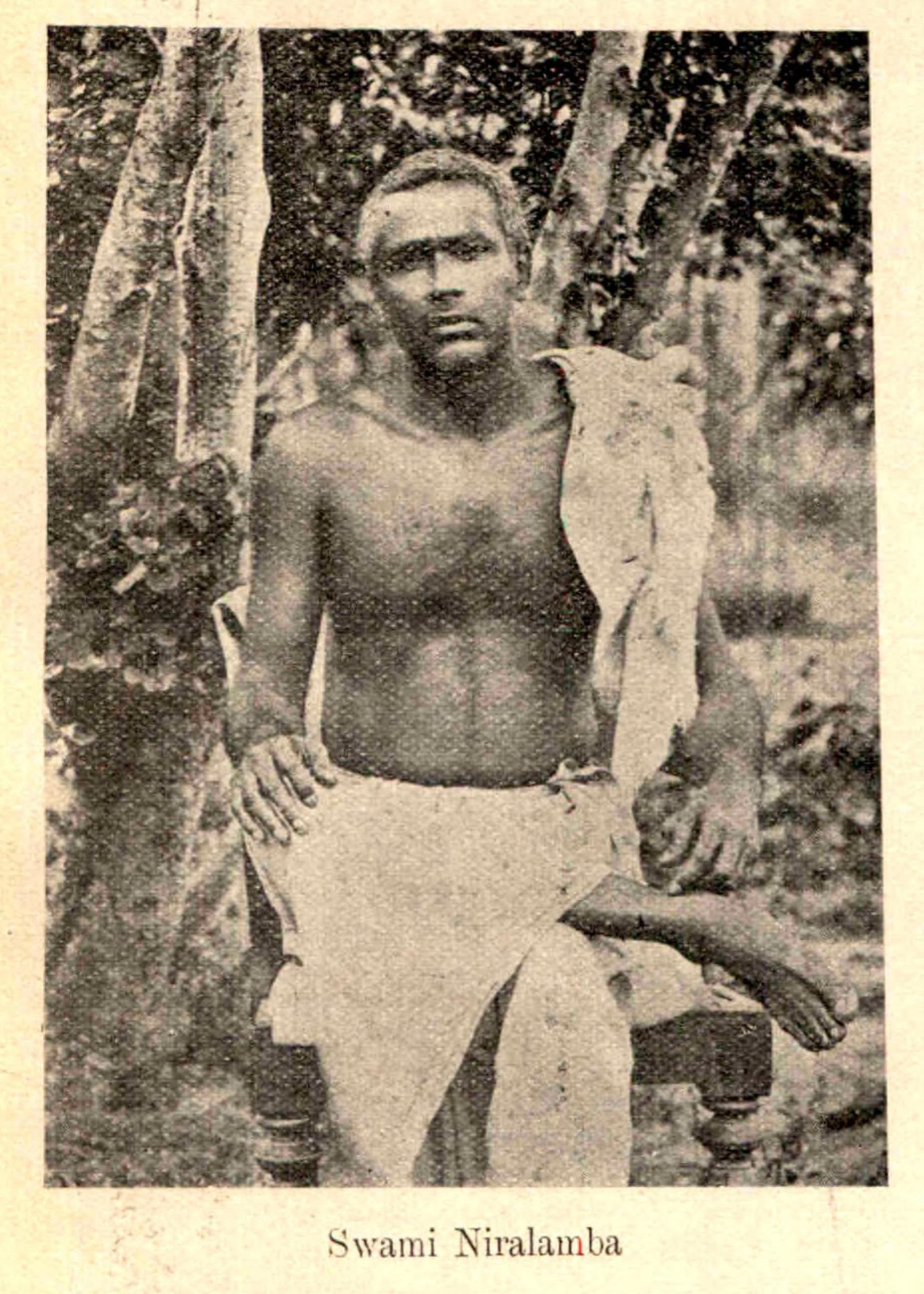
- Niralamba Swami

Personal life
- Born: Jatindra Nath Banerjee; 19 November 1877 Channa, Bengal, British India
- Died: 5 September 1930 (aged 52) Channa, Bengal, British India
- Parents: Kalidas Bannerjee (father); Ashambhabini devi (mother)

Religious life
- Religion: Hinduism
- Philosophy: Advaita Vedanta

Religious career
- Teacher: Soham Swami
- Disciples: Prajnanapada

Jatindra Nath Banerjee (Niralamba Swami) (19 November 1877 – 5 September 1930) was one of two great Indian nationalists and freedom fighters – along with Aurobindo Ghosh (Sri Aurobindo) – who dramatically rose to prominence between 1871 and 1910.

== Biography ==
Niralamba Swami was born as Jatindra Nath Banerjee on 19 November 1877 at Channa village in Burdwan district. His father, Kalidas Bannerjee, worked as a government official at Bangaon of Jessore district (now North Twenty Four Parganas) of Bengal.His early education was completed at the village school. Then he passed FA (First Arts) from Burdwan Raj College, which was then affiliated with the University of Calcutta with high marks. He was admitted to B.A. class in the college.

== Freedom struggle ==
While at college, Jatindra Nath (Jatindra Nath Banerjee) began developing interest in political activities of India. He was drawn towards radical and revolutionary methods of attaining independence.

He felt that revolutionary methods were necessary to attain independence and he became the first to preach the adoption of revolutionary methods for attaining independence.

For using revolutionary methods, a large army was needed and so martial training of countrymen was essential. So Jatindra Nath left his studies halfway in search of martial training. He tried to get himself enlisted in the British army but did not succeed.

=== Baroda ===
Having failed to enlist himself in the British army, Jatindra Nath began wandering in search of a job. He reached Baroda. At Baroda he met Aurobindo Ghose Sri Aurobindo. Aurobindo was highly impressed by his robust health and helped him in finding a job in the Baroda army. In the year 1897, Jatindra Nath joined the Baroda army as a bodyguard of the king of Baroda. He also became an associate of Aurobindo.

Aurobindo began devoting energy towards national activities. When Anushilan Samiti was formed at Kolkata, Aurobindo sent a request to Jatindra Nath to join the organisation. So Jatindra Nath left his job in Baroda to join Anushilan Samiti. He became one of its prominent members.

Jatindra Nath's father did not like the fact that his son had left his studies and that he had involved himself in anti-British activities. To divert his son's attention towards family matters, he married him off. But still Jatindra Nath became more deeply involved in the freedom movement of the country.

The Alipore bomb case and repression of all revolutionary activities in Bengal forced Jatindra Nath lose interest in the nationalist activities. He went back to his native Channa village. Soon he was married off by his parents to Hiranmoyee.

== Spiritual transformation ==
=== Early indication ===
During his childhood Jatinindra Nath Banerjee was known to be unruly, but as a teenager he became thoughtful. He began to frequently visit the temple of goddess Bishalakshi (another name of the goddess Durga), where he would sit for hours in deep contemplation.

=== Sannyasa ===
After the suppression of revolutionary activities in Bengal, Jatin (Jatinindra Nath Banerjee) went back to his native village. His mind became engrossed in spiritual thoughts. He would frequently visit the temple of Bishalaakshi ('Large-eyed Goddess') and would remain there for hours. He would pray for spiritual strength self-purification and spiritual knowledge. He began to feel the need for a guru. Meanwhile, his parents died and a daughter was born to him. He felt a deep need to get rid of worldly ties. Consequently, one night he became a wandering monk (i.e. he took Sannyasa).

Jatin felt that for gaining spiritual knowledge he needed the help of a guru and hence he began to search for one. He wandered many places in search of a guru but could not find any genuine ones.

=== Wanderings ===
During his wanderings he reached Varanasi. There he met a monk who suggested him to go to Nainital where he (Jatin) would find his destined guru

=== Nainital ===
When Jatindra Nath reached Nainital from Varanasi he became very tired and exhausted. Yet he managed to find Soham Swami, his destined guru. Soham Swami had established an ashram near the bank of a river. He welcomed Jatindra Nath with open arms and made him his disciple on the same day.

Soham Swami was one of the most eminent disciples of Tibbetibaba, the legendary yogi of India. He was the author of books like 'Soham Gita', 'Soham Samhita', 'Truth' (this book was the only book written by him in English poetry. It was published in Calcutta, now Kolkata, in 1913) and 'Common Sense.’

In his autobiographical work, Why I Am An Atheist, Bhagat Singh, a prominent freedom fighter, wrongly referred to Niralamba Swami as the author of a book titled Common Sense. Swami in fact wrote only the introduction to it.

=== Haridwar ===
Soham Swami asked Jatindra Nath Banerjee to go to Haridwar, where he had established an ashram. At this place Jatindra Nath began scaling great spiritual heights and finally attained knowledge of Brahman or God in His form without any attributes.

Soham Swami was very pleased with the spiritual success of Jatindra Nath Banerjee and so he was rechristened with the name of Srimat Niralamba Swami. But he became popular with the name of Niralamba Swami.

Niralamba Swami now had many admirers and devotees from Punjab, Haryana, and regions around Delhi. His fame for spiritual knowledge and wisdom spread far and wide. After staying in Haridwar for some years he developed a desire to establish an ashram at Channa village. He conveyed his request to his guru and was granted the permission to establish an ashram at his native village.

=== Channa village ===
After staying in the northern India for many years, Niralamba Swami reached Channa village, his native place. Many people of his village and other nearby villages had gathered to have a glimpse of their famous man. He first visited his home to meet his wife. Through her he came to know that his only child (his daughter) had expired. He managed to convince his wife to spend the rest of her life with him as the Mother of the soon to be constructed ashram at the village. She was re-christened as 'Chinmoyee Devi'.

Soon an ashram was constructed by the side of the village river bank and Niralamba Swami began staying at the ashram with his wife and some devotees and disciples.

Niralamba Swami's fame as a great Guru and a yogi spread even more in India. His life at the ashram was spent both as a 'bhogi' (enjoyer) and a yogi. He would daily consume the best quality betel leaves and tobacco available at the time.

It did not remain unknown that the former freedom fighter had become a famous yogi of India. So many former comrades of Niralamba Swami (formerly Jatindra Nath Banerjee) and many freedom fighters began visiting him for spiritual guidance and inspiration.

Among the notable freedom fighters to have visited Niralamba Swami was the legendary Bhagat Singh. He had met Niralamba Swami at Channa ashram at Channa village in the beginning of 1929(1927– 1928 according to some).

Another famous person associated with Niralamba Swami was Prajnanapada (1891–1974).He was popular with the name of Swami Prajnanapada. He became Niralamba Swami's disciple in 1924–25 at Channa ashram. He also became a monk (took to Sannyasa). Prajnanapada was a follower of Advaita Vedanta philosophy and taught realisation of Self-knowledge using Jñāna Yoga method (the path of self-realisation using knowledge).

Many distinguished persons had also visited Niralamba Swami at his Channa ashram at Channa village. Among them was Tibbetibaba. Niralamba Swami had hailed Tibbetibaba as one of the greatest exponent of Advaita Vedanta after Adi Shankara.

He died on 5 September 1930.

== Teachings ==
- Wake up and realise Self-Consciousness.
- Know yourself. If you do not know yourself, then how can you know your country?
- If you want to get rid of the sufferings of your country, then you have to become strong. To make yourself strong you have to first acquire Self-Knowledge. Self-strength makes human beings to cross difficult deserts and mountains. Nothing is impossible for a race possessing Self-strength
