= Arnaud Desjardins =

French film director

Arnaud Desjardins (French: [aʁno deʒaʁdɛ̃]; June 18, 1925 in Paris – August 10, 2011 in Grenoble) was a French author. He was a producer at the Office de Radiodiffusion Télévision Française from 1952 to 1974, and was one of the first high-profile practitioners of Eastern religion in France. He worked on television documentaries about spiritual traditions not well known to many Europeans at the time, including Hinduism, Tibetan Buddhism, Zen, and Sufism from Afghanistan.

== Life and work ==
Arnaud Desjardins was the son of Jacques Guérin-Desjardins. He was part of the George Gurdjieff group, his first contact with mysticism. Educated in a Protestant Christian environment, he was exposed to spiritual aspects of Christianity on a visit to a trappist Catholic monastery. He then became interested in yoga, and when asked to direct a film for French television, he chose to make a series of films on India, for which he gained attention for his first film, Ashrams.

He met a spiritual teacher, Swami Prajnanpad, whom he got to know after filming a number of mystics from various traditions. He became a practitioner of Adhyatma yoga, which is a branch of Advaita Vedanta.

== Works ==
=== Filmography ===
Hinduism:

- Ashrams, 1959

Tibetan Buddhism:

- Le Message des Tibétains: Le Bouddhisme (première partie), 1966
  - The Message of the Tibetans: First Part, Buddhism (VHS), Alize Diffusion (1994)
- Le Message des Tibétains: Le Tantrisme (deuxième partie), 1966
  - The Message of the Tibetans: Second Part, Tantrism (VHS), Alize Diffusion (1994)

In this two-part documentary, Arnaud Desjardins documents the practices and rites of Tibetans, and meets the Dalai Lama and spiritual teachers of Tibetan Buddhism and Tantra.

- Himalaya, Terre de Sérénité: Le Lac des Yogis (première partie), 1968
- Himalaya, Terre de Sérénité: Les Enfants de la Sagesse (deuxième partie), 1968

Zen Buddhism:

- Zen: Ici et Maintenant (première partie), 1971
- Zen: Partout et Toujours (deuxième partie), 1971

Soufism:

- Soufis D'Afghanistan: Maître et Disciple (première partie), 1974
- Soufis D'Afghanistan: Au Cœur des Confréries (deuxième partie), 1974

=== Bibliography ===
- Ashrams, Grands Maîtres de l'Inde, Paris, La Palatine, 1962
- Yoga et Spiritualité, L'Hindouisme et Nous, Paris, La Palatine, 1964
- Le Message des Tibétains, Paris, La Table ronde, 1966 (The message of the Tibetans, Stuart & Watkins, 1969)
- Les Chemins de la Sagesse (Tomes I, II, III), Paris, La Table ronde, 1968, 1970 and 1972
- Monde Moderne et Sagesse Ancienne, Paris, La Table ronde, 1973
- Adhyatma Yoga, À la Recherche du Soi I, Paris, La Table ronde, 1977
- Le Védanta et l'Inconscient, À la Recherche du Soi II, Paris, La Table ronde, 1979
- Au-Delà du moi, À la Recherche du Soi III, Paris, La Table ronde, 1979
- Tu Es Cela, À la Recherche du Soi IV, Paris, La Table ronde, 1979
- Un Grain de Sagesse, Paris, La Table ronde, 1983
- Pour une Mort sans Peur, Paris, La Table ronde, 1983
- Rencontre avec Arnaud & Denise Desjardins, Actes du colloque Institut Karma-Ling 16, 17, 18 July 1984, Prajna
- Pour une Vie Réussie, un Amour Réussi, Paris, La Table ronde, 1985 / Towards the Fullness of Life, Threshold Books, 1989, Kathleen Kennedy (Translator)
- Filigrane Vol. 1 - Entretiens avec Arnaud Desjardins et Christian Charrière, Argel, 1986
- La Voie du Cœur, Paris, La Table ronde, 1987
- L'Audace de Vivre, Paris, La Table ronde, 1989 / The Jump Into Life: Moving Beyond Fear, Hohm Press, 1994, Kathleen Kennedy (Translator)
- Approaches de la Méditation, Paris, La Table ronde, 1989
- La Voie et ses Pièges, Paris, La Table ronde, 1992
- Confidences Impersonnelles (Entretiens avec Gilles Farcet), Paris, Critérion, 1991
- Zen et Védanta, Paris, La Table Ronde, 1995
- Dialogue à Deux Voies (avec Lama Denis Teundroup), Paris, La Table ronde, 1993
- L'Ami Spirituel (avec Véronique Loiseleur), Paris, La Table ronde, 1996
- Regards Sages sur un Monde Fou (Entretiens avec Gilles Farcet), Paris, La Table ronde, 1997
- Arnaud Desjardins - Textes recueillis par Marc de Smedt, Question de N°111, Albin Michel, 1998
- En Relisant les Évangiles (avec Véronique Loiseleur), Paris, La Table ronde, 1999
- La conversion intime, Alice, 2000
- Arnaud Desjardins au Québec, Montréal, Stanke, 2002
- Retour à l'Essentiel, Paris, La Table ronde, 2002
- La transmission spirituelle – Textes recueillis par Yvan Amar, Du Relié, 2003
- Bienvenue sur la Voie, Paris, La Table ronde, 2004
- Premiers pas vers la Sagesse, Collection Librio-Spiritualité N°661, Librio, 2004
- Lettre à une jeune disciple, Paris, La Table ronde, 2006

== See also ==
- Adhyatma yoga

== Sources ==
- Arnaud Desjardins, ou l'Aventure de la Sagesse, Gilles Farcet, Paris, La Table Ronde, 1990
- Arnaud Desjardins, l'Ami Spirituel, Jacques Mousseau, Paris, Perrin, 2002
