= Jacques Guérin-Desjardins =

National Commissioner of Eclaireurs Unionistes de France
- In office 1923–1936

Personal details
- Born: November 1894
- Died: 1982 (aged 87–88)

Jacques Guérin-Desjardins (French: [ʒak ɡeʁɛ̃ deʒaʁdɛ̃]; November 1894 – 1982) was the National Commissioner of Eclaireurs Unionistes de France from 1923 to 1936. He had been a Boy Scout in Britain where he was educated, attended the Birmingham Scout Rally in 1913, and served as the interpreter of Lord Baden-Powell at International Conferences and World Jamborees. He was a recipient of the Silver Wolf Award, the highest award made by The Scout Association "for services of the most exceptional character.".

He was a lieutenant at Verdun, a recipient of the Croix de Guerre with citations, Légion d’Honneur and was promoted to captain in 1940 with a second Croix de Guerre. He married Antoinette Nègre from Nîmes, was the father of three children, the eldest of whom was Arnaud Desjardins. Later, he was a Human Resources Director at Peugeot.
