= Prajnanapada =

Swami Prajnanapada

Personal life
- Born: Yogeshwar Chattopadhyay; 8 February 1891 Chinsurah, Bengal, British India
- Died: 5 September 1974 (aged 83) Ranchi, India

Religious life
- Religion: Hinduism
- Philosophy: Advaita Vedanta

Religious career
- Teacher: Niralamba Swami
- Disciples: Arnaud Desjardins

Prajnanapada, popularly known as Swami Prajnanapada or Swami Prajnanpad (1891–1974) of Channa Ashram (located at Channa village), was one of the eminent disciples of Niralamba Swami, the great yogi and Guru of India. He was born on 8 February 1891. He entered the life of Sannyasa and became Niralamba Swami’s disciple in 1924-25 at Channa ashram. Besides living at Channa Ashram (located at Channa village, Burdwan, India), he had also established an ashram in Ranchi, India.

Instead of espousing political discourse, Swami Prajnanapada was known for his one-to-one contact with his disciples and devotees. He was an astute psychoanalyst as well.

== Life ==
=== Early life ===
Swami Prajnanapada was born as Yogeshwar Chattopadhyay on 8 February 1891 at Chinsurah, near Kolkata(then Calcutta), in West Bengal, India. He was the fourth of 5 children. His parents and eldest brothers died in an epidemic when he was young. His elder brother Lakshmi Narain took care of his education. In 1916 he graduated from Srirampur, a town near Kolkata. In 1918 he graduated with a gold medal with a master's degree in Physics from Calcutta University. Between 1918 and 1920 he taught at TNG College, Chagalpur and B.N.College, Patna. In 1920 he joined the non-cooperation against the British Raj, called by the Indian national congress.

=== Spiritual awakening ===
In 1921 he met Niralamba Swami who later became his Guru. Though he was increasingly turning to spirituality he continued teaching at various universities in Bengal and Bihar. In 1923 he was invited to lecture at Kashi Vidyapith, one of the most famous colleges of Banaras Hindu University. In 1925 he took sannyasa and wandered in the Himalayas. His brother persuaded him to return assuring him that he could carry on his spiritual quest at home. He returned to Kashi Vidyapith. In the same year a daughter was born, named Chinmayee.

In 1930 he gave up his teaching post and left Varanasi for good, at the behest of Niralamba Swami who requested him to take charge of Channa Ashram after his death.

=== Final years ===
Swami Prajnanpada had a congenital heart condition which deteriorated with passage of time partly due to the intensive psychoanalysis sessions he conducted for his disciples. He had his first serious heart attack in 1972. In 1974 he died at the Ranchi Ashram.

== Disciples ==
Some of his notable Indian and non- Indian disciples included R. Srinivasan, Yogendra Narayan Verma, Shailaja Devi Verma, Sumongal Prakash, Minati Prakash, Daniel Roumanoff, Pierre Wack, Frédéric Leboyer, Roland de Quatrebarbes, Arnaud Desjardins, Denise Desjardins, and Olivier Cambessedes.
