= Soham Swami =

Indian philosopher

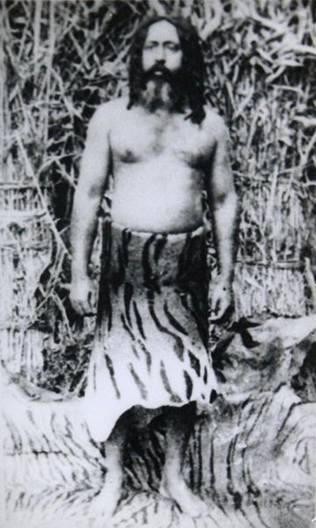
- Swami in 1904

Personal life
- Born: Shyamakanta Bandyopadhyay; 1858 Dhaka, Bengal, British India
- Died: 6 December 1918 (aged 59–60) Nainital, United Provinces of British India

Religious life
- Religion: Hinduism
- Philosophy: Advaita Vedanta

Senior posting
- Teacher: Tibbetibaba
- Disciples: Niralamba Swami

Soham Swami was a Hindu guru and yogi from India.

The Indian nationalist Jatindra Nath Banerjee became his disciple in Nainital and received from him the name Niralamba Swami.
