= Goel =

Goel or Goyal (alternative transliterations of Hindi गोयलl) is a surname of Indian origin. It may refer to:

== Goel ==
- Adarsh Kumar Goel (born 1953), Indian judge
- Anita Goel, American physicist, physician, and scientist
- Aseem Goel, Indian politician
- Ashok Goel, professor of computer science
- Atul Kumar Goel, Indian businessman
- Charti Lal Goel (1927–2016), Indian politician
- David Goel (born 1970), American hedge fund manager
- Devendra Goel (1919–1979), Indian film director and producer
- Goel Ratzon (born 1950), Israeli polygamist
- Karan Goel, Indian cricket player
- Lalit Goel (born 1960)
- Lalit Kumar Goel (born 1960)
- Malaika Goel (born 1997), Indian shooter
- Manish Goel, Indian film and television actor
- Manju Goel (born 1945), Indian judge
- Mukul Goel, Indian civil servant
- Nitin Goel (born 1969), Indian cricket player
- Piyush Goel (born 1967), Indian author
- Prabhu Goel (born 1949), Indian-American researcher
- Prem Shanker Goel, Indian space scientist
- Rajat Goel (born 1993), Indian cricket player
- Rajinder Goel (1942–2020), Indian cricket player
- Rajiv Goel, American executive
- Ram Niwas Goel, Indian politician
- Ritika Goel, Canadian writer
- Samant Goel, Indian civil servant
- Saavan Goel, head graphologist from Karnataka
- Seema Goel, Canadian artist
- Shiv Charan Goel, Indian politician
- Shyam Goel, Indian script writer
- Sita Ram Goel (1921–2003), Indian historian, religious and political activist, writer, and publisher in the late twentieth
- Surendra Prakash Goel (1946–2020), Indian politician
- Suresh Goel (1943–1978)
- Surily Goel, Indian fashion designer
- Swati Goel
- Trilok Chandra Goel (born 1938), Indian surgeon
- Veena Goel (born 1981), American writer
- Vijay Goel (politician) (born 1954), Indian politician
- Vijay K. Goel, American engineer
- Vipul Goel (born 1972), Indian politician
- Vivek Goel

== Goyal ==
- Ajay Goyal (born 1965), Indian businessman
- Chandrakanta Goyal (1932–2020), Indian politician
- Des Raj Goyal (1929–2013), Indian journalist, academic, and author
- Naresh Goyal (born 1949), Indian businessman
- Nidhi Goyal (born 1985), Indian disability and gender rights activist
- Piyush Goyal (born 1964), Indian politician
- Shipra Goyal, Indian singer
- Ved Prakash Goyal (1926–2008), Indian politician

== Other ==
- Goel (Judaism)

== See also ==
- Goell
