= Atul =

Atul may refer to:

== People ==
- Atul Agnihotri (born 1970), Indian actor
- Atul Bakshi (born 1956), Indian glass artist
- Atul Bhatkhalkar (born 1965), Indian politician
- Atul Butte (1970–2025), American medical researcher and biotechnology entrepreneur
- Atul Dodiya (born 1959), Indian artist
- Atul Gawande (born 1965), Indian-American surgeon
- Atul Kale (born 1970), Indian actor and singer
- Atul Kapoor (born 1966), Indian actor
- Atul Kasbekar (born 1965), Indian photographer
- Atul Khatri (born 1968), Indian comedian
- Atul Kochhar (born 1969), Indian chef
- Atul Kulkarni (born 1965), Indian actor
- Atul Kumar (disambiguation)
  - Atul Kumar (chemist), Indian chemist
  - Atul Kumar (ophthalmologist), Indian ophthalmologist
- Atul Kumar Goel, Indian businessman
- Atul Kumar Rai (born 1992), Indian novelist and screenwriter
- Atul Parchure (born 1966), Indian actor
- Atul Rai (born 1982), Indian politician
- Atul Prasad Sen (1871–1934), Indian writer and musician
- Atul Sharma (born 1961), Indian musician
- Atul Subhash (born 1990), Indian software engineer

== Other uses ==
- Atul, Gujarat, a village in India
- Atul (company), a chemical conglomerate in India
- Atul Auto, a rickshaw manufacturer in India

== See also ==
- Atulya (disambiguation)
