= Atulya =

Atulya may refer to:

== People ==
- Atulya Ghosh (1904–1986), Bengali Indian politician
- Atulya Priyankar (born 1986), Indian cricketer
- Atulya Prasad Sen, Indian composer

== Other uses ==
- Atulya Nadheswarar Temple, Hindu temple

== See also ==
- Atul (disambiguation)
- Bhumibol Adulyadej, King of Thailand from 1946 to 2016
