= Retopia (festival) =

Retopia is an annual technical symposium of the Indian Department of Energy and Environment at the TERI School of Advanced Studies in New Delhi. Retopia refers to getting back to an ideal state or situation, derived from the word Utopia. The symposium provides a common platform to people from the government, academic institutions, industries, start-ups etc. to discuss clean energy prospects on environmental, technical, social and commercial lines. Retopia has witnessed participation from the Ministry of New and Renewable Energy, the World Bank, Tata Consultancy Services (TCS), the Bureau of Energy Efficiency, the Indian Energy Exchange, and Suzlon.

== History ==
The first Retopia was in 2010. The 2014 Retopia was inaugurated by Minister of Power, New and Renewable Energy and Coal Piyush Goel.

== Events ==
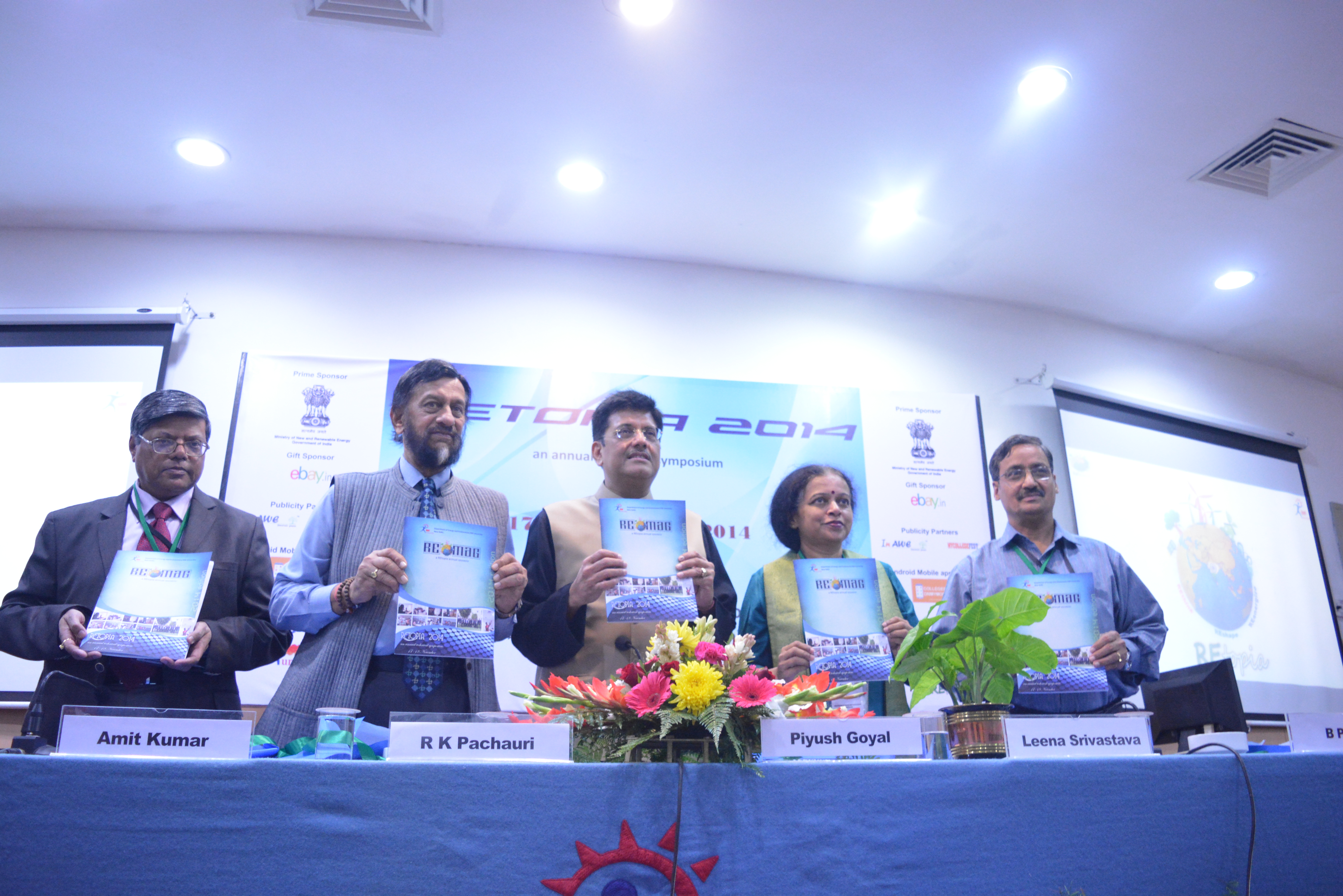
Piyush Goel, Rajendra K. Pachauri at the launch of the 4th Retopia festival.

=== Expert Session ===
Renewable energy industrialists, policy makers, and academics attend a knowledge exchange session. In the past, speakers from General Electric, PTC India, CLP Group, Green Business Certification Institute GBCI, ReNew Power, and the sustainability division of ITC Hotels have attended the event.

=== Renewable Energy Design Challenge (Syncreate) ===
Retopia serves as a venue for entrepreneurs and technocrats to showcase their technical and managerial skills to a panels of experts from the market. The participants develop business models aiming to minimize transmission losses, increase energy efficiency or conserve energy of existing systems or replace them entirely by eco-friendly solutions.

=== Troubleshooting RE Industry Problem (Quest) ===
The participants test their knowledge and expertise by solving real-life problems related to renewable energy. A series of problems provided by various companies are displayed on the website of REtopia, and the participants are expected to comes up with a solution.

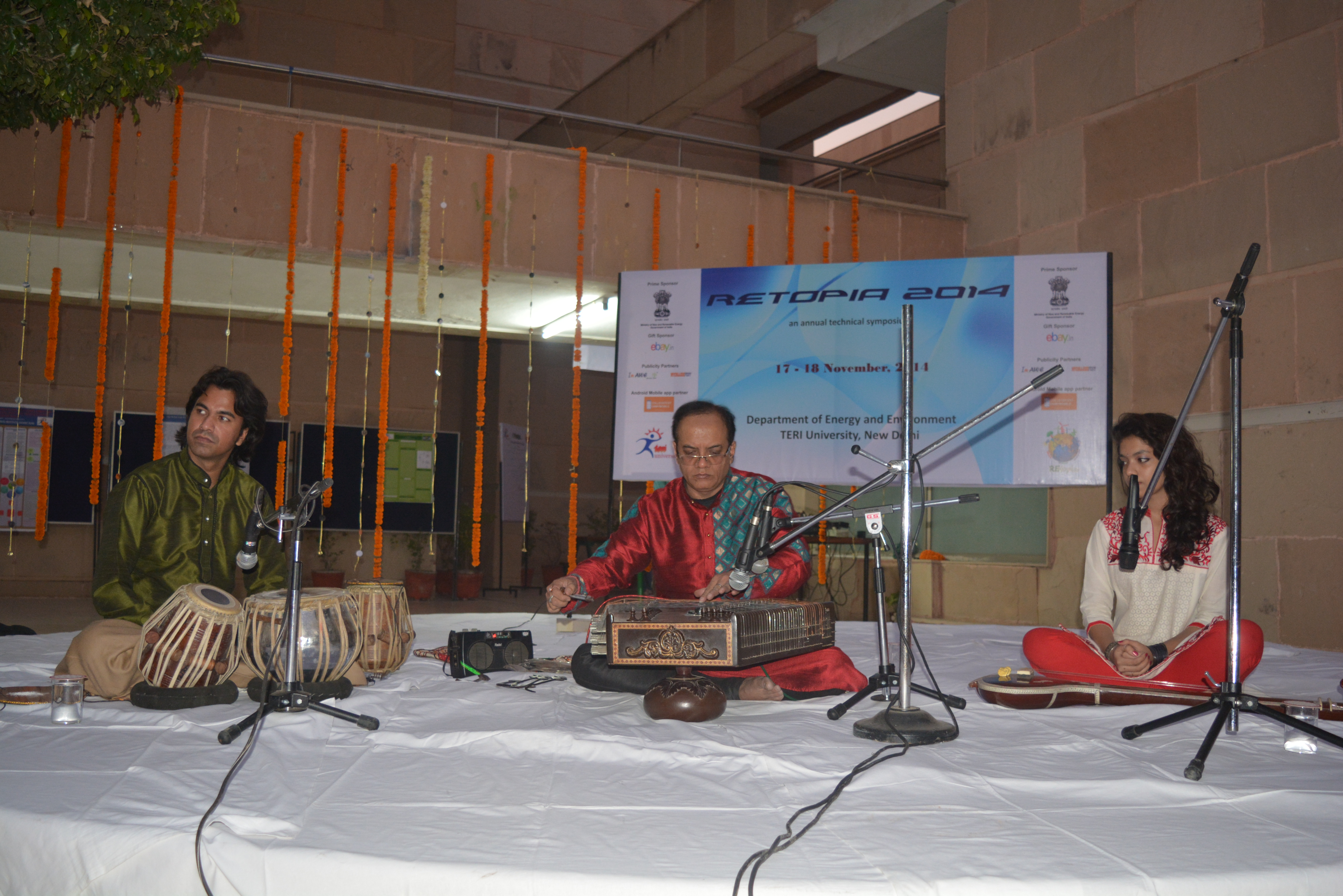
Santoor Event Organised at Teri SAS during its annual Retopia symposium.

=== Sustainovation (Eureka) ===
Entrepreneurs from various domains of energy and environment share their valuable experiences and insights with the participants. Founders of Grassroots & Rural Innovative Development GRID, Mera Gaon Power, Eco-Eclectic Technologies, Edible Routes etc. have delivered talks in Retopia.

=== Poster Presentation (Envision) ===
Poster presentation on topics related to renewable energy, energy access, rural electrification, micro-grids, micro-financing of sustainable solutions, energy conservation, energy efficiency, and energy management. The posters are then judged by market and academic experts.

=== Photography Competition (Capture) ===
A photography competition to spread awareness and gain insight about everyday interaction with energy and environment.

== Social Cause ==
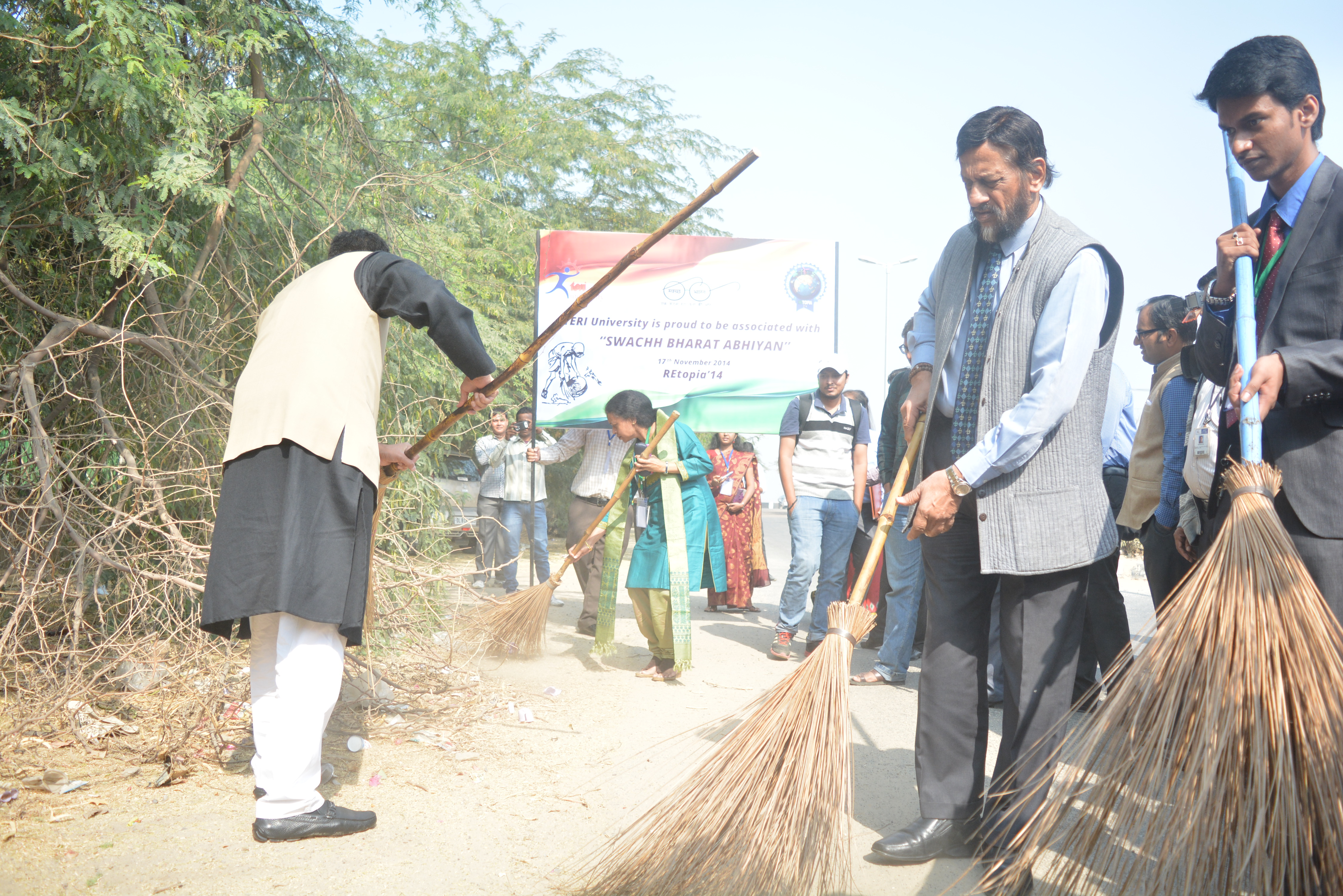
Piyush goel, Rajendra K. Pachauri participating at the Swachh Bharat Mission.

=== Swachh Bharat Mission ===
On the 4th edition of Retopia, Piyush Goel, along with the then Chancellor at Teri University, Rajendra K. Pachauri, participated in the first national cleanliness mission at Teri University. They took broomsticks and cleaned the roads at Vasant Kunj where TERI School of Advanced Studies is located.
