= NITW =

NITW may refer to:

- Night in the Woods, a video game
- National Institute of Technology, Warangal, a public technological university in Warangal, India
