= New Bengal Association =

Activist group in India

The New Bengal Association was founded by Atulya Ghosh, Dhirendranath Mukherji, Jadabendranath Panja, Nalinaksha Sanyal and Sukumar Dutta to press for the Partition of Bengal to create West Bengal as a homeland of the Bengali Hindu people. It along with the Bengal Provincial Hindu Mahasabha and the Indian Association submitted a joint memorandum before the Bengal Boundary Commission for the inclusion of Hindu-majority territories in West Bengal. After the Partition, it campaigned for the inclusion of Bengali-speaking areas of Bihar for their incorporation into West Bengal.

== History ==
New Bengal Association was one of four organizations that represented the non-Muslim side in the Partition of Bengal, at the Bengal Boundary Commission that made public sittings in Kolkata on 16–24 July 1947. The Association argued that the Bengali Hindus were a distinct race and therefore it was justified in its demand for enough living space for the sustenance of the race. At the commission, Major General A. C. Chatterjee, the President of New Bengal Association, called for 'minimum irreconcilable demand' for a territory having enough area to sustain 27 million Bengali Hindu people. The proposed territory of West Bengal consisted of the ten Hindu-majority districts, two Muslim-majority districts of Malda and Murshidabad because of their strategic locations, parts of Nadia, Faridpur & Dinajpur and few police stations of Rangpur and Rajshahi, which roughly consisted of 57% of the area of Bengal.

On 25 January 1948, the New Bengal Association organized a conference in Kolkata to discuss the possible merger of Bengali-speaking areas of Bihar and Orissa to West Bengal. At the conference, Dr. S. K. Ganguly demanded the merger of Manbhum, Hazaribagh, Santal Parganas, Ranchi, Purnea and parts of Singbhum district of Bihar in West Bengal. He also demanded the merger of Seraikela state into West Bengal.

In 1949, on the question of merger of the princely state of Cooch Behar into the Indian Union, the opinion of the people of Cooch Behar was divided. The ruling dispensation of Cooch Behar and a section of the Assamese nationalists favoured a merger of the state with Assam, while the subjects favoured a merger with West Bengal. In this situation, on 14 July, Jawahar Lal Nehru, announced plebiscite as a solution at a public meeting in Kolkata. On 20 July, at a meeting held at Mahabodhi Society Hall in favour of the merger of Cooch Behar into West Bengal, Dr. S. K. Ganguly the president of New Bengal Association condemned the Prime Minister's announcement of plebiscite as a conspiracy against the people of Bengal.

== See also ==
- Indian Association
