= Atul Kumar =

Atul Kumar may refer to:

- Atul Kumar (chemist), Indian organic chemist
- Atul Kumar (ophthalmologist), Indian ophthalmologist, Padma Shri awardee
