= Rao Remala =

Lead developer of Windows operating system

Rao Remala is an Indian former software developer, now angel investor, and philanthropist. He was one of the lead developers of the first version of Microsoft Windows.

== Life ==
Rao Remala was born in T. Kothapalem village Nagayalanka Mandalam in Krishna district of Andhra Pradesh, India, to a Kapu family. He received a bachelor's degree in Electrical Engineering from NIT Warangal and master's degree from IIT Kanpur.

Remala worked at HCL before he was hired at Microsoft in 1981, becoming the first Indian employee of the company.
