= Arakandanallur =

- panchayat town
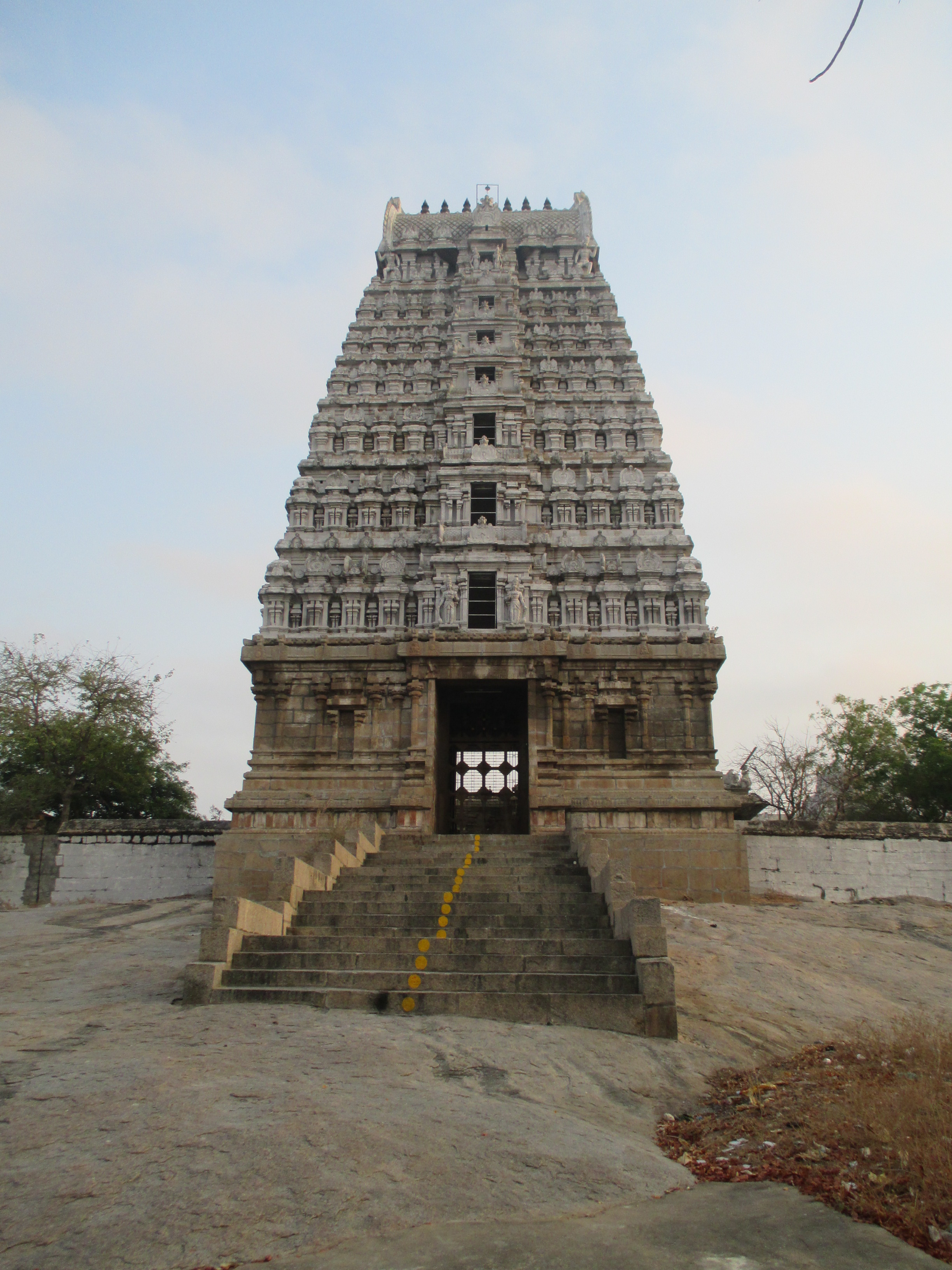
- Tower of Atulya Nadeswarar temple

- Location in Tamil Nadu, India
- Coordinates: 11°58′58″N 79°13′41″E
- Country: India
- State: Tamil Nadu
- District: Viluppuram

Population (2021)
  - Total: 12,761

Languages
  - Official: Tamil
- Time zone: UTC+5:30 (IST)

Arakandanallur is a panchayat town in Viluppuram district in the state of Tamil Nadu, India. The place is known for the historic Atulya Nadheswarar Temple built in rock-cut architecture on a small hillock.

== Demographics ==
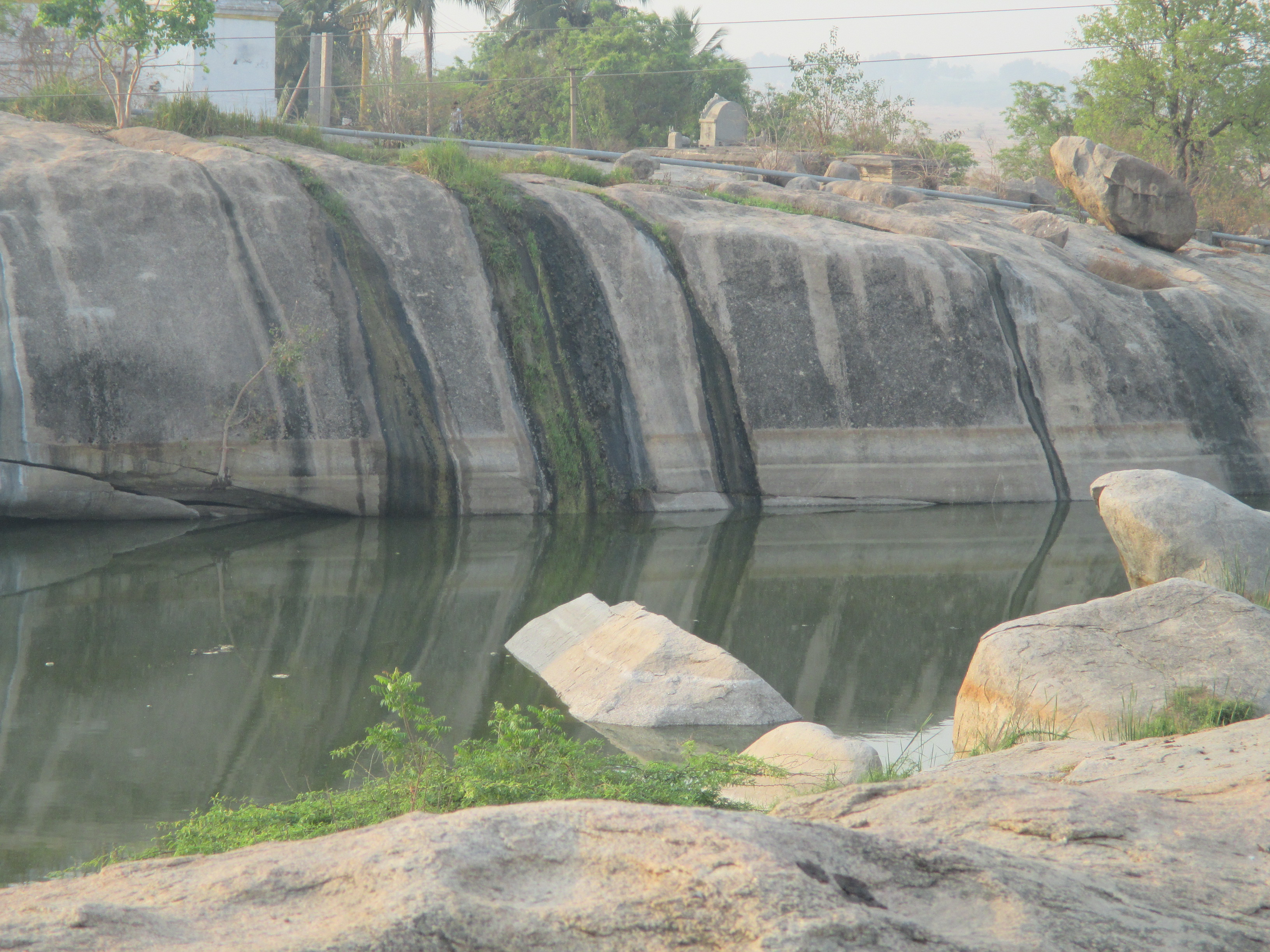
Rocky terrain is a common feature in the place

As of 2001 India census, Arakandanallur had a population of 4450. Males constitute 50% of the population and females 50%. Arakandanallur has an average literacy rate of 75%, higher than the national average of 59.5%; with 58% of the males and 42% of females literate. 10% of the population is under 6 years of age.

== Schools and colleges ==
Though in this town Panchayat, Many Colleges and schools were present. Some of the places are:

1. Government Polytechnic College
2. Valliammai college of arts and Science for Women
3. Government Higher Secondary School
4. Sri Lakshmi Vidhyalaya Higher Secondary School
5. Balamandir Matriculation Higher Secondary school
