= Siva S. Banda =

Indian-American aerospace engineer

Siva Subrahmanyam Banda
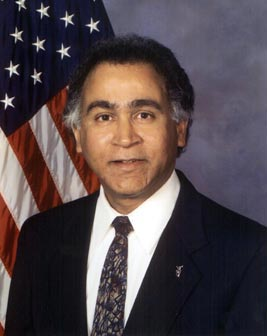
- Siva S. Banda
- Born: Vijayawada, Madras State, India (now Andhra Pradesh, India)
- Education: Regional Engineering College, Warangal (B.S.E.E.); Indian Institute of Science (M.S.); Wright State University (M.S.); University of Dayton (Ph.D.)
- Children: 1
- Engineering career
- Discipline: Aerospace Engineering

Siva Subrahmanyam Banda is an Indian-American aerospace engineer. He was Director of the Control Science Center of Excellence and Chief Scientist for the Aerospace Systems Directorate at the United States Air Force Research Laboratory at Wright-Patterson Air Force Base. He has taught at Wright State University, the University of Dayton, and the Air Force Institute of Technology.

== Background ==
Siva Banda was born in Andhra Pradesh, India. He received a Bachelor of Science degree in electrical engineering from the Regional Engineering College, Warangal, India in 1974, followed by a Master of Science degree in aerospace engineering from the Indian Institute of Science, Bangalore, India in 1976. He then came to the United States and attended college briefly at the University of Cincinnati before transferring to Wright State University in Dayton, Ohio, where he earned another Master of Science in systems engineering, in 1978. Banda completed his Ph.D. in aerospace engineering at the University of Dayton in 1980. His doctoral dissertation was entitled "Maximum likelihood identification of aircraft lateral parameters with unsteady aerodynamic modeling".

== Career ==
Banda joined the U.S. Air Force Flight Dynamics Laboratory at Wright-Patterson Air Force Base (WPAFB) in 1981 as an aerospace research engineer in the Flight Controls Division. He started his career as an in-house researcher.

Banda then served as the group leader and program manager before being promoted to branch chief, a position in which he served from 1995 to 1996. From 1996 to 2000, he served as the technical leader for the Air Vehicles Directorate at the United States Air Force Research Laboratory (AFRL) at WPAFB. From 2000 to 2011, he served as the Director of the Control Science Center of Excellence and Senior Scientist for the Air Vehicles Directorate at AFRL at WPAFB. From 2011 to 2012, he served as the Chief Scientist for Air Vehicles Directorate, AFRL, WPAFB. He held the position of Chief Scientist of the Aerospace Systems Directorate at AFRL/WPAFB. He is now retired from the air force and is now a listed expert for Dayton Aerospace.

== Professional accomplishments ==
Banda is a technical adviser to the Air Force Office of Scientific Research, Defense Advanced Research Projects Agency, Office of Naval Research, National Aeronautics and Space Administration, and National Research Council. He serves on the American Institute of Aeronautics and Astronautics, and the Institute of Electrical and Electronics Engineers. He served on the board of Editors for the Advances in Design and Control series published by the Society for Industrial and Applied Mathematics. He is a Fellow of the Air Force Research Laboratory, American Institute of Aeronautics and Astronautics and the Royal Aeronautical Society.

=== Patents ===
Banda holds two patents - one for a control mechanism for unknown systems which can be applied to an arbitrary electromechanical system without prior knowledge of its transfer function, and the second for a smart controller that uses artificial intelligence.

=== Awards and honors ===
- 2000 IEEE Control Systems Technology Award
- 2001 Evening plenary speaker, Special Sessions, IEEE Conference on Decision and Control
- 2002 Fellow, Institute of Electrical and Electronics Engineers (IEEE)
- 2002 Board of Governors, IEEE Control Systems Society
- 2004 National Academy of Engineering
- 2010 Fellow of the International Federation of Automatic Control

== See also ==
- List of Indian Americans
