= Jejur =

- Village
- Location in West Bengal, India Jejur (India)
- Coordinates: 22.88°N 88.12°E
- Country: India
- State: West Bengal
- District: Hooghly

Population (2011)
  - Total: 5,173

Languages
  - Official: Bengali, English
- Time zone: UTC+5:30 (IST)
- PIN: 712405
- Telephone code: 91 3212
- ISO 3166 code: IN-WB

Jejur is a gram panchayat under Haripal block in Chandannagar subdivision of Hooghly district in the Indian state of West Bengal.

== Geography ==
Jejur is located at 22.88°N 88.12°E.

Jejur gram panchayat is composed of the following villages: Rajaballabhbati, Mannapara, Purbba Narayanpur, Kankrajol, Amgachhi, Jejur, Jinpur, Raghunathpur, Kalachhara and Meshera.

== Demographics ==
As per 2011 Census of India Jejur had a total population of 5,173 of which 2,579 (50%) were males and 2,594 (50%) were females. Population below 6 years was 523. The total number of literates in Jejur was 3,703 (79.63% of the population over 6 years).

== Economy ==
=== Agriculture ===
This is a rich agricultural area. Though rice is the prime crop of the district, the agricultural economy largely depends on potato, jute, vegetables and orchard products. Vegetable is a prize crop in the blocks of Haripal, Singur, Chanditala, Polba and Dhaniakhali being grown in a relay system throughout the year. Though potato is cultivated in all the blocks of this district Dhaniakhali, Arambagh, Goghat, Pursurah, Haripal, Polba-Dadpur, Tarakeswar, Pandua and Singur contributed much of its production of this district.

Some of the primary and other hats or markets in the Haripal block area are: Basudevpur hat, Bondipur hat, Dar hatta hat, Jejur Daily Market, Kaikala hat, Kalchara hat, Nalikul hat, Sipaigachi hat, Jagin market, Haripal Barabazar and Haripal Station Bazar.

== People ==
Atulya Ghosh, freedom fighter and once the strongman of the Congress Party, was born at Jejur on 28 August 1904. Also, Shree Bijoy Krishna Mitra is a prominent figure from Jejur who traversed all over the country and contributed immensely to the infrastructure building of the nation along with his village development. His long association with HCC has been well recognised.

== Education ==
Jajur High School is a boys only higher secondary school. It has arrangements for teaching Bengali, English, Sanskrit, history, philosophy, political science, economics and mathematics.

Jajur Karunamoyee Mukhopadhyay Balika Vidyalaya is a girls only secondary school with arrangements for teaching from Class VI to X. It was established in 1959.

== Transport ==
=== Bus ===
==== Private Bus ====
- 18 Haripal railway station - Chunchura Court
- 18A Haripal railway station - Dasghara

==== Bus Routes Without Numbers ====
- Jangipara - Chunchura Court

=== Train ===
The nearest railway station, Haripal railway station, is about 10 kilometres (6.2 mi) away.
