= Haripal (community development block) =

- Community development block
- Coordinates: 22.833333°N 88.116667°E
- Country: India
- State: West Bengal
- District: Hooghly

Government
  - Type: Representative democracy

Area
  - Total: 184.42 km^{2} (71.20 sq mi)
- Elevation: 16 m (52 ft)

Population (2011)
  - Total: 261,073
  - Density: 1,415.6/km^{2} (3,666.5/sq mi)

Languages
  - Official: Bengali, English
- Time zone: UTC+5:30 (IST)
- PIN: 712403 (Haripal); 712405 (Khamarchandi); 712407 (Nalikul)
- STD: 03212
- ISO 3166 code: IN-WB
- Vehicle registration: WB-15, WB-16, WB-18
- Literacy: 78.59%
- Lok Sabha constituency: Arambagh
- Vidhan Sabha constituency: Haripal
- Website: hooghly.gov.in

Haripal is a community development block that forms an administrative division in Chandannagore subdivision of Hooghly district in the Indian state of West Bengal.

== Overview ==
The Haripal CD Block is part of the Hooghly-Damodar Plain, one of the three natural regions in the district of the flat alluvial plains that form a part of the Gangetic Delta. The region has many depressions which receive water from the surrounding lands during the rainy season and discharge the water through small channels.

== Geography ==
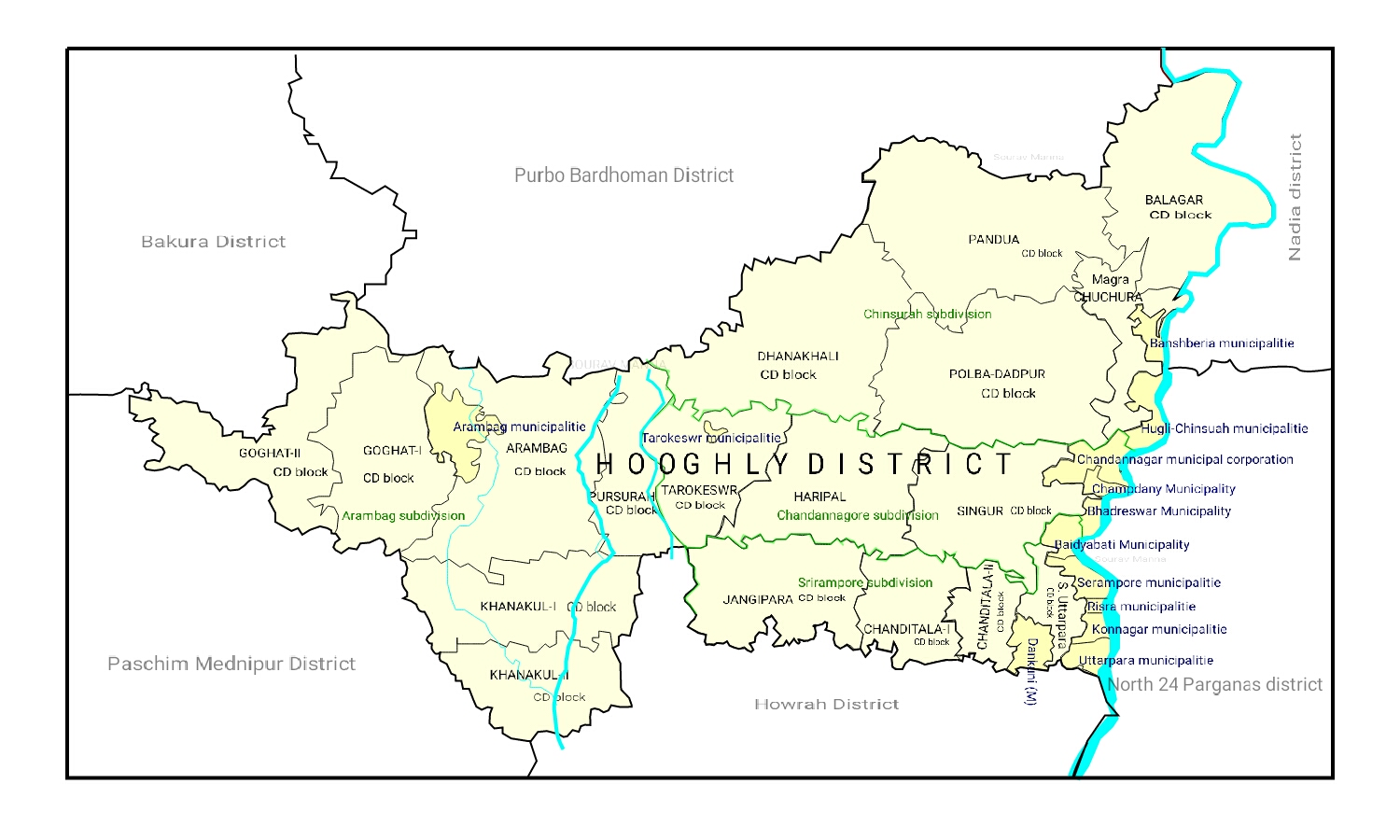
Map of Hooghly district showing CD blocks and municipal areas

Haripal CD Block is bounded by Dhaniakhali and Polba Dadpur CD Blocks in the north, Singur CD Block in the east, Chanditala I and Jangipara CD Blocks in the south and Tarakeswar CD Block in the west.

It is located 34 km from Chinsurah, the district headquarters.

Haripal CD Block has an area of 184.42 km^{2}. It has 1 panchayat samity, 15 gram panchayats, 208 gram sansads (village councils), 154 mouzas and 152 inhabited villages. Haripal police station serves this block. Headquarters of this CD Block is at Khamarchandi.

Map of Haripal CD block

Gram panchayats of Haripal block/ panchayat samiti are: Bandipur, Chandanpur, Dwarhata, Haripal-Asutosh, Haripal-Sahadev, Haripur-Kinkarbati, Jejur, Kaikala, Nalikul-Paschim, Nalikul-Purba, Narayanpur-Bahirkhand, Olipur-Kashipur, Pantra, Paschim Gopinathpur and Sripatipur-Elipur.

== Demographics ==
=== Population ===
As per the 2011 Census of India, Haripal CD Block had a total population of 261,073, of which 256,507 were rural and 4,566 were urban. There were 131,757 (50%) males and 129,316 (50%) females. Population below 6 years was 26,259. Scheduled Castes numbered 73,178 (28.03%) and Scheduled Tribes numbered 17,498 (6.70%).

As per the 2001 census, Haripal block had a total population of 235,671, out of which 118,464 were males and 117,207 were females. Haripal block registered a population growth of 14.29 per cent during the 1991-2001 decade. Decadal growth for Hooghly district was 15.72 per cent. Decadal growth in West Bengal was 17.84 per cent.

There is only one Census Town in Haripal CD Block (2011 census figure in brackets): Bargachhia (4,566).

Large villages (with 4,000+ population) in Haripal CD Block are (2011 census figures in brackets): Kaikala (5,571), Paschim Narayanpur (4,184), Gopinagar (4,512), Jejur (5,173), Bandipur (4,979), Malia (4,393) and Shripatipur (5,727).

Other villages in Haripal CD Block include (2011 census figure in brackets): Haripal (3,395), Paschim Gopinathpur (2,709), Dwarhatta (3,779), Khamar Chandi (3,320) and Nalikul (1,734).

=== Literacy ===
As per the 2011 census the total number of literates in Haripal CD Block was 184,531 (78.59% of the population over 6 years) out of which males numbered 100,034 (84.41% of the male population over 6 years) and females numbered 84,497 (72.66% of the female population over 6 years). The gender disparity (the difference between female and male literacy rates) was 11.75%.

See also – List of West Bengal districts ranked by literacy rate

Literacy in CD blocks of
Hooghly district
Arambagh subdivision
Arambagh – 79.10
Khanakul I – 77.73
Khanakul II – 79.16
Goghat I – 78.70
Goghat II – 77.24
Pursurah – 82.12
Chandannagar subdivision
Haripal – 78.59
Singur – 84.01
Tarakeswar – 79.96
Chinsurah subdivision
Balagarh – 76.94
Chinsurah Mogra – 83.01
Dhaniakhali – 75.66
Pandua – 75.86
Polba Dadpur – 75.14
Srirampore subdivision
Chanditala I – 83.76
Chanditala II – 84.78
Jangipara – 75.34
Sreerampur Uttarpara – 87.33
Source: 2011 Census: CD Block Wise
Primary Census Abstract Data

=== Language and religion ===
Religion in Haripal CD block (2011)
Hinduism	78.42%
Islam	20.39%
Other (tribal religion)	0.99%
Other or not stated	0.20%

As per the 2011 census, majority of the population of the district belong to the Hindu community with a population share of 82.9% followed by Muslims at 15.8%. The percentage of the Hindu population of the district has followed a decreasing trend from 87.1% in 1961 to 82.9% in the latest census 2011. On the other hand, the percentage of Muslim population has increased from 12.7% in 1961 to 15.8% in 2011 census.

In 2011 census Hindus numbered 204,728 and formed 78.42% of the population in Haripal CD Block. Muslims numbered 53,226 and formed 20.39% of the population. Others numbered 3,119 and formed 1.19% of the population.

Languages of Haripal CD block (2011)
1. Bengali (95.5%)
2. Santali (3.20%)
3. Hindi (1.20%)
4. Others (0.15%)

At the time of the 2011 census, 95.45% of the population spoke Bengali, 3.20% Santali and 1.20% Hindi as their first language.

== Rural poverty ==
As per poverty estimates obtained from household survey for families living below poverty line in 2005, rural poverty in Haripal CD Block was 27.56%.

== Economy ==
=== Livelihood ===
Livelihood
in Haripal CD Block
1. Cultivators (17.1%)
2. Agricultural labourers (40.0%)
3. Household industries (5.92%)
4. Other Workers (36.9%)

In Haripal CD Block in 2011, amongst the class of total workers, cultivators formed 17.13%, agricultural labourers 40.05%, household industry workers 5.92% and other workers 36.92%.

=== Infrastructure ===
There are 152 inhabited villages in Haripal CD Block. 100% villages have power supply. 116 villages have more than one source of drinking water (tap, well, tube well, hand pump), 3 villages have only tube well/ borewell and 32 villages have only hand pump. 8 Villages have post offices, 19 villages have sub post offices and 3 villages have post and telegraph offices. 147 villages have landlines, 92 villages have public call offices and 150 villages have mobile phone coverage. 46 villages have pucca roads and 39 villages have bus service (public/ private). 22 villages have agricultural credit societies, 20 villages have commercial/ co-operative banks and 4 villages have bank ATMs.

Important Handicrafts of Hooghly District
- Zari Work on Sari - Pandua, Pursurah, Jangipara, Tarakeswar and other blocks - 3,000 families involved
- Chikon Embroidery – Babnan, Pandua, Singur - 2,500 families involved
- Silk and Cotton Printing – Serampore (Chanditala) - 300 families involved
- Brass and Bell Metal – Manikpat, Goghat, Arambagh - 150 families involved
- Conch Shell – Pandua, Khanakul, Makla, Chandannagar
- Jute Diversified Product – Baidyabati, Mogra
- Terracota – Chinsurah, Chandannagar, Baidyabati, Mogra

Source:District Human Development Report 2010: Hooghly P. 67

=== Agriculture ===
This is a rich agricultural area with several cold storages. Though rice is the prime crop of the district, the agricultural economy largely depends on potato, jute, vegetables, and orchard products. Vegetable is a prize crop in the blocks of Haripal, Singur, Chanditala, Polba and Dhaniakhali being grown in a relay system throughout the year. Though potato is cultivated in all the blocks of this district Dhaniakhali, Arambagh, Goghat, Pursurah, Haripal, Polba-Dadpur, Tarakeswar, Pandua and Singur contributed much of its production of this district.

Some of the primary and other hats or markets in the Haripal block area are: Basudevpur hat, Bondipur hat, Dar hatta hat, Jejur Daily Market, Kaikala hat, Kalchara hat, Nalikul hat and Nalikul Station Bazar, Nalikul Bakchi Bazar, Kinkarbati Hattala, Sipaigachi hat, Jagin market, Haripal Barabazar and Haripal Station Bazar.

The Tebhaga movement launched in 1946, in 24 Parganas district, aimed at securing for the share-croppers a better position within the existing land relation structure. Although the subsequent Bargadari Act of 1950 recognised the rights of bargadars to a higher share of crops from the land that they tilled, it was not implemented fully. Large tracts, beyond the prescribed limit of land ceiling, remained with the rich landlords. From 1977 onwards major land reforms took place in West Bengal. Land in excess of land ceiling was acquired and distributed amongst the peasants. Following land reforms land ownership pattern has undergone transformation. In 2013–14, persons engaged in agriculture in Haripal CD Block could be classified as follows: bargadars 9.99%, patta (document) holders 5.18%, small farmers (possessing land between 1 and 2 hectares) 8.20%, marginal farmers (possessing land up to 1 hectare) 29.40% and agricultural labourers 47.23%.

Haripal CD Block had 178 fertiliser depots, 55 seed stores and 61 fair price shops in 2013–14.

In 2013–14, Haripal CD Block produced 35,819 tonnes of Aman paddy, the main winter crop from 13,688 hectares, 13,073 tonnes of Boro paddy (spring crop) from 4,568 hectares, 551 tonnes of Aus paddy (summer crop) from 187 hectares, 24,953 tonnes of jute from 1,195 hectares, 173,968 tonnes of potatoes from 8,466 hectares. It also produced oilseeds .

In 2013–14, the total area irrigated in Haripal CD Block was 19,329 hectares, out of which 12,295 hectares were irrigated by canal water, 2,620 hectares by tank water, 50 hectares by river lift irrigation, 930 hectares by deep tube wells and 3,434 hectares by shallow tube wells.

=== Banking ===
In 2013–14, Haripal CD Block had offices of 16 commercial banks and 5 gramin bank.

== Transport ==
Haripal CD Block has 8 originating/ terminating bus routes.

The broad gauge Sheoraphuli–Tarakeswar branch line was opened by the Tarkessur Railway Company on 1 January 1885 and was worked by East Indian Railway Company. The Tarkessur company was taken over by the East Indian Railway in 1915. Haripal railway station is a suburban station on the line and is 45 kilometres (28 mi) from Howrah. There are stations at Nalikul, Maliya (halt), Haripal and Kaikala on the Howrah-Tarakeswar branch line. The Howrah–Bardhaman chord, a shorter link to Bardhaman from Howrah than the Howrah–Bardhaman main line, was constructed in 1917. There are stations at Madhusudanpur, Chandanpur and Porabazar.

It is part of Kolkata Suburban Railway.

State Highway 2 (West Bengal) running from Bankura to Malancha (in North 24 Parganas district) passes through this CD Block.

== Education ==
In 2013–14, Haripal CD Block had 187 primary schools with 14,660 students, 13 middle schools with 1,554 students, 9 high schools with 5,266 students and 17 higher secondary schools with 20,252 students. Haripal CD Block had 1 general college with 6,864 students, 1 technical/ professional institution with 100 students and 398 institutions for special and non-formal education with 7,868 students

Vivekananda Mahavidyalaya, Haripal, a general degree college, established at Haripal in 1966.

In Haripal CD Block, amongst the 152 inhabited villages, 11 villages had no school, 60 villages had more than 1 primary school, 103 villages had at least 1 primary school, 38 villages had at least 1 primary and 1 middle school and 23 villages had at least 1 middle and 1 secondary school.

== Healthcare ==
In 2014, Haripal CD Block had 1 rural hospital, 3 primary health centres and 6 private nursing homes with total 55 beds and 8 doctors (excluding private bodies). It had 42 family welfare subcentres. 18,732 patients were treated indoor and 444,417 patients were treated outdoor in the hospitals, health centres and subcentres of the CD Block.

Haripal CD Block has Haripal Rural Hospital (with 30 beds) at PO Khamarchandi, Bandipur Primary Health Centre (with 10 beds), Olipur PHC (with 6 beds) and Chapsara PHC at PO Hurat (with 6 beds).

Haripal CD Block is one of the areas of Hooghly district where ground water is affected by moderate level of arsenic contamination. The WHO guideline for arsenic in drinking water is 10 mg/ litre, and the Indian Standard value is 50 mg/ litre. In Hooghly district, 16 blocks have arsenic levels above WHO guidelines and 11 blocks above Indian standard value. The maximum concentration in Haripal CD Block is 100 mg/litre.
