= Dwarhatta =

- Village
- Location in West Bengal, India Dwarhatta (India)
- Coordinates: 22.7913°N 88.0727°E
- Country: India
- State: West Bengal
- District: Hooghly

Population (2011)
  - Total: 3,799

Languages
  - Official: Bengali, English
- Time zone: UTC+5:30 (IST)
- PIN: 712403
- Telephone/STD code: 03212
- Lok Sabha constituency: Arambagh
- Vidhan Sabha constituency: Haripal
- Website: hooghly.gov.in

Dwarhatta is a village and a gram panchayat in the Haripal CD block in the Chandannagore subdivision of Hooghly district in the Indian state of West Bengal.

== Geography ==
Cities and towns in the Chandannagore subdivision and Polba Dadpur and Dhaniakhali CD Blocks of Chinsurah subdivision in Hooghly district
M: municipal corporation/ municipal city/ town, CT: census town, R: rural/ urban centre,
Owing to space constraints in the small map, the actual locations in a larger map may vary slightly

=== Location ===
Dwarhatta is located at 22.7913°N 88.0727°E

=== Urbanisation ===
In Chandannagore subdivision 58.52% of the population is rural and the urban population is 41.48%. Chandannagore subdivision has 1 municipal corporation, 3 municipalities and 7 census towns. The single municipal corporation is Chandernagore Municipal Corporation. The municipalities are Tarakeswar Municipality, Bhadreswar Municipality and Champdany Municipality. Of the three CD Blocks in Chandannagore subdivision, Tarakeswar CD Block is wholly rural, Haripal CD Block is predominantly rural with just 1 census town, and Singur CD Block is slightly less rural with 6 census towns. Polba Dadpur and Dhaniakhali CD Blocks of Chinsurah subdivision (included in the map alongside) are wholly rural. The municipal areas are industrialised. All places marked in the map are linked in the larger full screen map.

== Demographics ==
According to the 2011 Census of India, Dwarhatta had a population of 3,799 of which 1,936 (51%) were males and 1,843 (49%) were females. Population in the age range 0–6 years was 370. The total number of literate persons in Kotalpur was 2,800 (81.66% of the population over 6 years).

== Culture ==
David J. McCutchion describes several temples at Dwarhatta:

- Rare examples of pancharatna temples with slender turrets are there at Dwarhatta
- Raj-Rajeswar temple (1728) of the Singha Roy family at Dwarhatta having atchala with porch on triple archway - it has tight scroll work above the archways but figures along the base and round the façade
- Pancharatna temples with ridged rekha turrets at Dwarhatta have facades fully decorated with figures

The Rajrajeswara temple (at Sr No S-WB-52) at Dwarhatta is included in the List of State Protected Monuments in West Bengal by the Archaeological Survey of India.

== Dwarhatta picture gallery ==
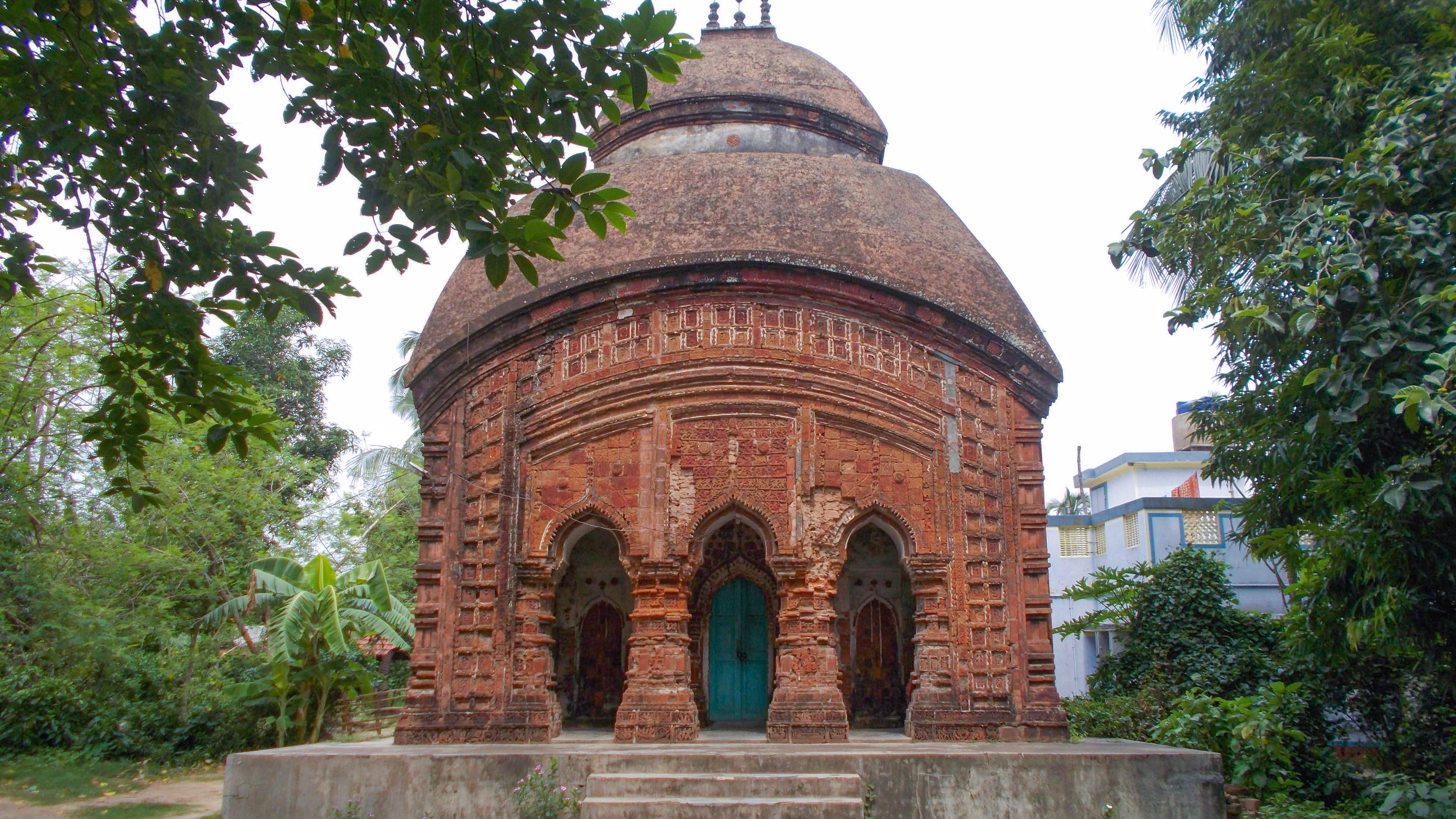
Rajrajeswara temple of Singha Roy family, built in 1728

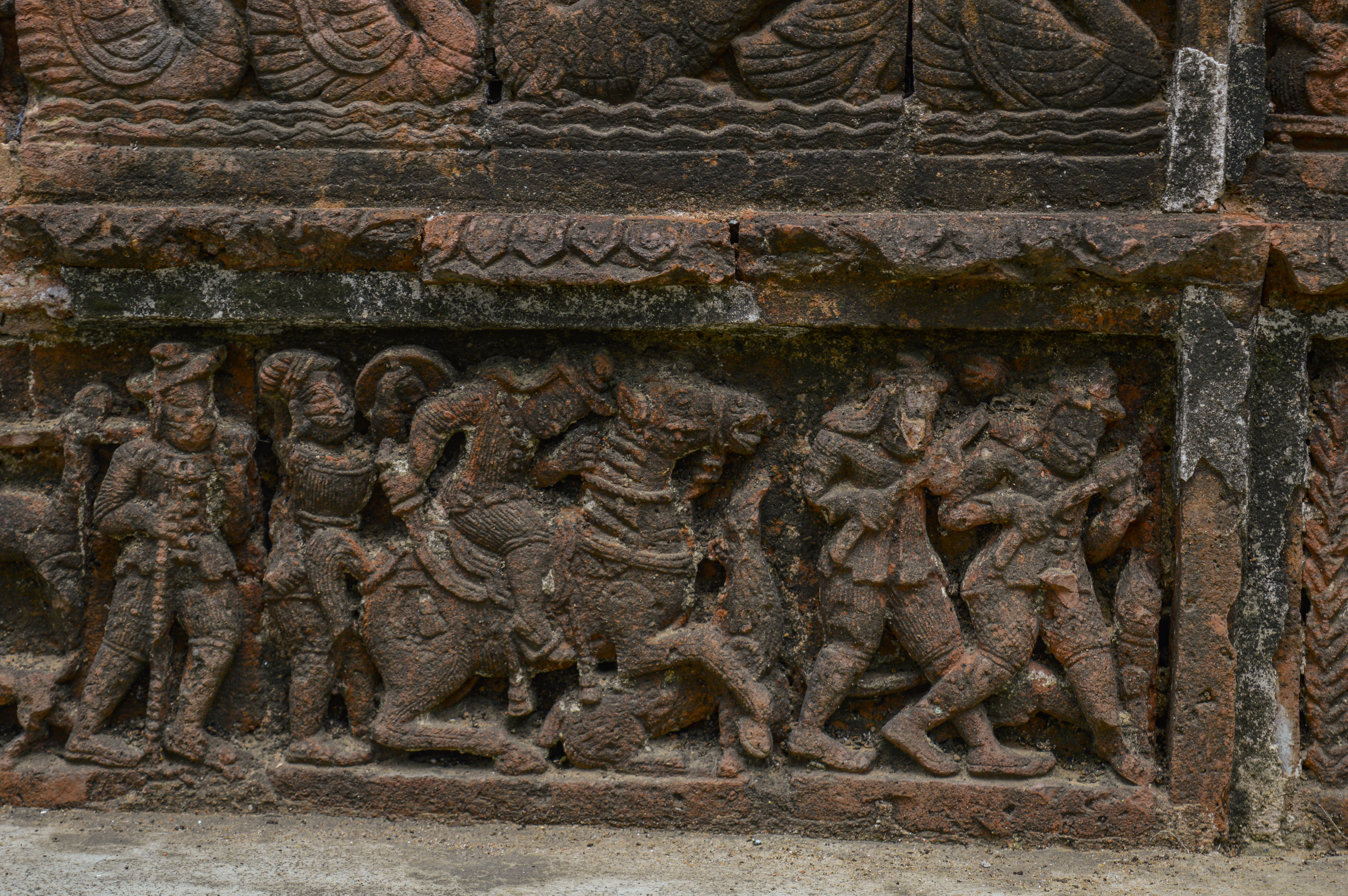
Terracotta relief at Rajrajeswara temple

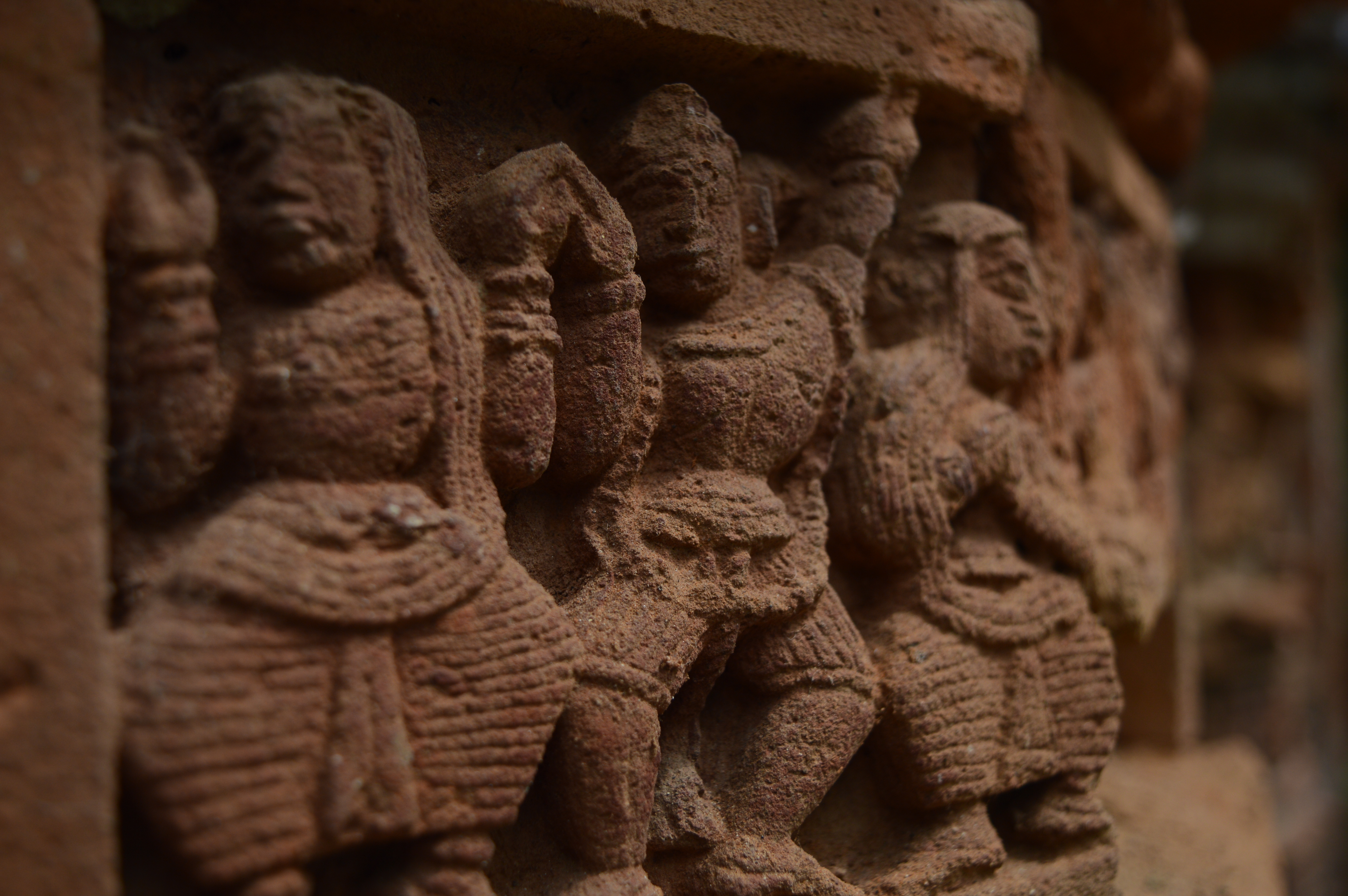
Terracotta relief at Rajrajeswara temple
