= Gotell =

Gotell is a surname. Notable people with the surname include:

- Chelsey Gotell (born 1986), Canadian Paralympic swimmer
- Walter Gotell (1924–1997), German actor

== See also ==
- Goell
