= Lalit Kumar Goel =

Professor in Singapore (born 1960)

- Born: 1960 (age 65–66); New Delhi, India
- Occupation: Professor of Electrical Engineering
- Employer: Nanyang Technological University
- Awards: IEEE Fellow (2013)

Academic background
- Education: National Institute of Technology, Warangal (BTech); University of Saskatchewan (MSc, PhD)

Lalit Kumar Goel (born 1960) is a Professor of Electrical Engineering at the Nanyang Technological University, Singapore. He was named Fellow of the Institute of Electrical and Electronics Engineers (IEEE) in 2013 for contributions to the development and application of reliability techniques in electric power systems.

== Education and career ==
Goel was born in New Delhi, India. He got his BTech degree in electrical engineering from the National Institute of Technology in Warangal, India in 1983. He then immigrated to Canada, where he attended University of Saskatchewan, Canada from which he got his M.Sc. and Ph.D. degrees in the same field in 1988 and 1991 respectively. From 2005 to 2008, Goel served as the Head of the Division of Power Engineering, and from July 2008 to June 2012 was Dean of Admissions & Financial Aid. He was appointed director of the Undergraduate Education in the President's Office, and served as such from 2013 to 2015.
