= Atul Kumar (ophthalmologist) =

Indian ophthalmologist

Atul Kumar MD
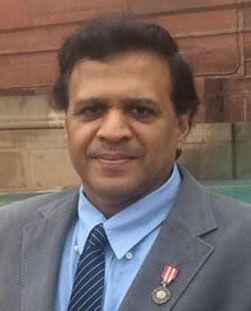
- Education: MBBS, MD, FAMS, FRCS (Ed.)
- Occupation: Vitreoretinal surgeon
- Organization: All India Institute of Medical Sciences
- Notable work: Research on the diseases of the retina and vitreous, retinal detachment surgery, macular hole surgery
- Title: Chief at RPC-AIIMS
- Predecessor: Yog Raj Sharma
- Honours: Padma Shri, Dr. B. C. Roy Award

Atul Kumar is an Indian ophthalmologist who is currently the Chief & Professor of Ophthalmology at Dr. Rajendra Prasad Centre for Ophthalmic Sciences (RPC-AIIMS), the national apex ophthalmic centre at All India Institute of Medical Sciences, Delhi. He was awarded the Padma Shri award in January 2007 for his services to the medical field. He specializes in vitreoretinal surgery and also heads the Vitreo-Retinal, Uvea and ROP services at RPC-AIIMS.

== Early life and education ==
Kumar was born in September 1956. After graduating from the Modern School, Barakhamba in Delhi, he graduated from the Maulana Azad Medical College. He studied ophthalmology at Dr. Rajendra Prasad Centre for Ophthalmic Sciences at All India Institute of Medical Sciences, Delhi (AIIMS), where he received an MD degree and completed his senior residency in vitreo-retina and uvea unit before joining the faculty. In 1991 he went had a fellowship in vitreoretinal surgery at the University of Maryland, Baltimore County.

== Achievements and positions ==
Kumar is a specialist in diseases of the retina, vitreous and uvea and their management. His academic disciplines include Vitreoretinal surgery, Ophthalmic Lasers, Uveal diseases, Macular Hole surgery, anti-VEGF injections, Age Related Macular Degeneration, Retinal Detachment surgery, Myopic Traction Maculopathy, Pathological Myopia and Macular Hole Retinal Detachment.

He is presently the Chief and Professor of Ophthalmology at Dr. Rajendra Prasad Centre for Ophthalmic Sciences, preceded in this post by Prof. Yog Raj Sharma. He is also commissioned as the Honorary Advisor in Ophthalmology to the Government of India (2016) and the Honorary Vitreo-Retinal Consultant to Armed Forces Medical Services from 2015 to 2018. Under his leadership, AIIMS doctors announced India as free of the eye infection Trachoma in March 2017. This announcement came as a part of golden jubilee celebration of the institute. Kumar is steering the national efforts towards elimination of blindness by heading the WHO Collaborating Centre for Prevention of Blindness in SEARO. Kumar has been associated with several organizations and holds positions of responsibilities with many of them.

Kumar is also a member of national and state ophthalmological societies in India and has held examiner positions in various medical examinations for graduates and postgraduates. He is presently the Chairman of the Advocacy Committee of All India Ophthalmological Society and the Honorary Editor of Indian Journal of Ophthalmology (IJO) on whose editorial board, he has been working previously. He has been a Past Chairperson of the Scientific Committee of Vitreo-Retinal Society of India (VRSI), a scientific organization of posterior-segment eye surgeons of India.

== Awards and recognitions ==
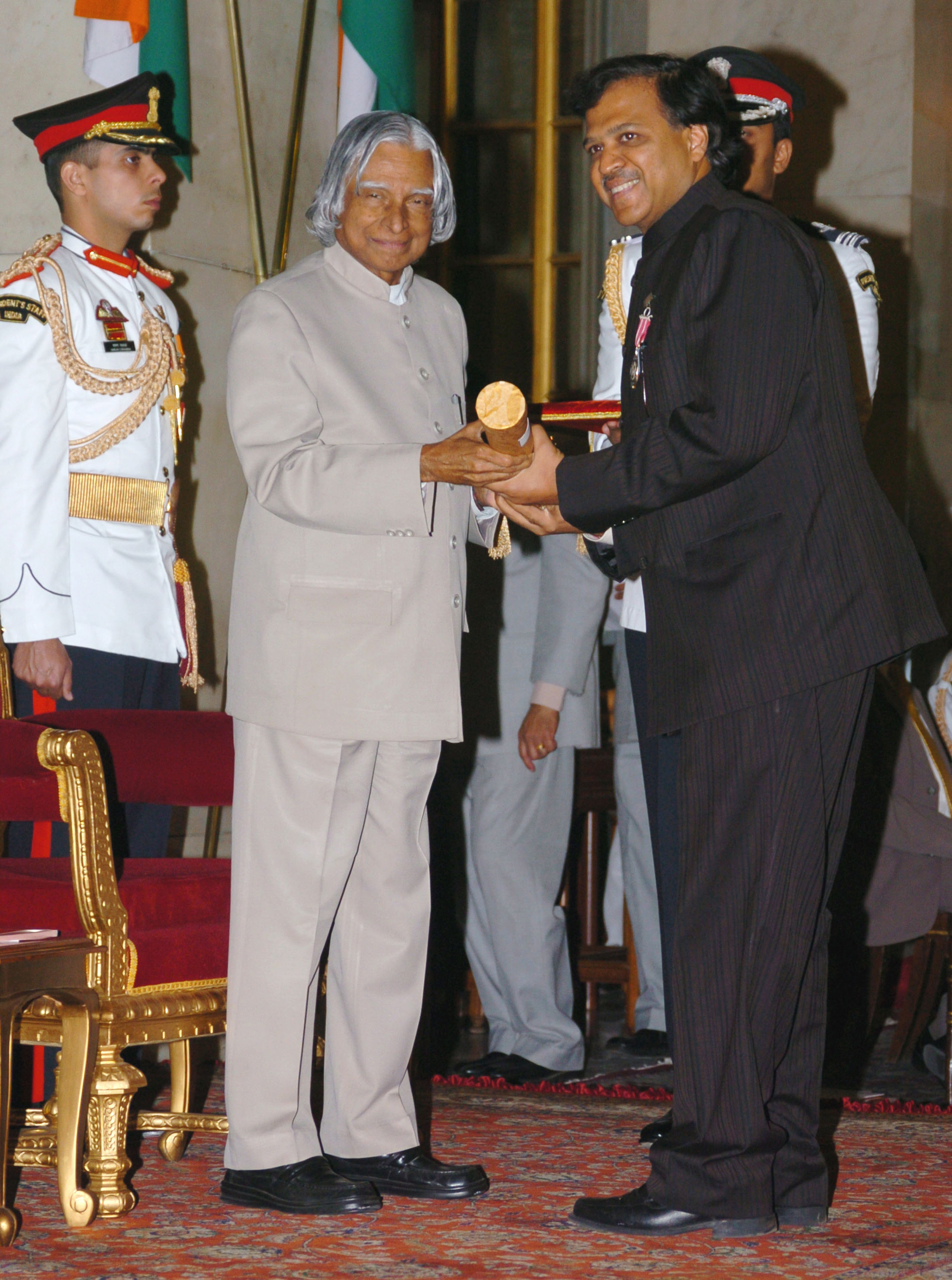
The President, A.P.J. Abdul Kalam presenting Padma Shri to Atul Kumar, at an Investiture-II Ceremony at Rashtrapati Bhavan in New Delhi on April 05, 2007

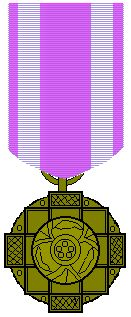
Padma Shri award, India's fourth highest civilian honour

The Padma Shri award was awarded to Kumar in 2007 by the 13th President of India, Shri Pranab Mukherjee. It is the fourth highest civilian award in India, given for services in medicine. The President of India has also conferred Dr. B.C. Roy National award to him for excellence in field of medicine in the category of Eminent Medical Teacher. The University Grants Commission recognized his scientific work by giving Hari Om Ashram Trust Award for role as outstanding social scientist for interaction between science and society. Kumar is also a fellow of National Academy of Medical Sciences, 2006. The alumni body of his high school too has felicitated him with Modern School Old Student Association (MSOSA) Excellence Award. Very recently, in 2017, he has been awarded the Fellowship of the Royal College of Surgeons, Edinburgh FRCS (ad hominem) for his furtherance and excellence in vitreo-retinal surgical techniques.

== Controversy ==
In April 2018, Kumar slapped a resident doctor at the RPC, eliciting major protests from the resident doctors of AIIMS.

== Publications ==
Kumar has over 250 publications in medical journals, chapters in over 20 books, authored various books on diseases of the retina and vitreous and their management.

=== Selected books/chapters ===
- Ocular Tuberculosis
- Ocular Infections: Prophylaxis and Management
- Lasers in Ophthalmology
- Ophthalmology Clinics for Postgraduates
- Disorders of Retina and Vitreous
- "Angiogenic Agents and Photodynamic Therapy" in Pharmacology of Ocular Therapeutics
- 'Retinal Laser Scanning and Digital Imaging' in 'Clinical Ophthalmology: Contemporary Perspectives'
- Contributions in Rashtriya Sahara (Volume 2, Issue 2), released by Sahara India Mass Communication, 1991

== See also ==
- Macular Disorders
- Retinal Implant
- Yog Raj Sharma
