= Goell =

Goell is a surname. Notable people with the surname include:

- Kermit Goell (1915–1997), American songwriter and archeologist, brother of Theresa
- Theresa Goell (1901–1985), American archaeologist

== See also ==
- Goel (disambiguation)
- Gotell
- List of valkyrie names
