= Atulya Nadheswarar Temple =

Shiva temple in Tamil Nadu, India

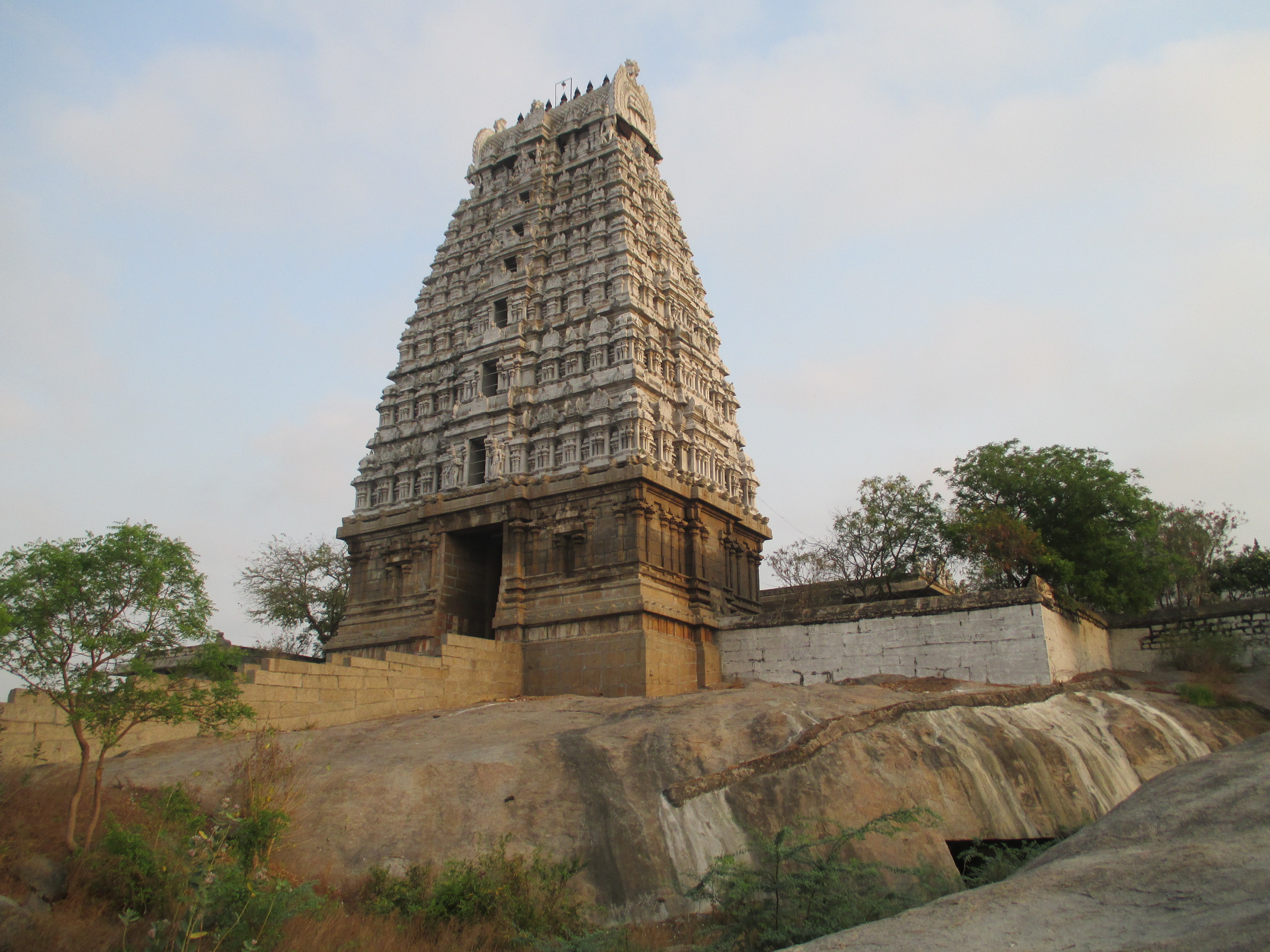

- Location in Tamil Nadu

Religion
- Affiliation: Hinduism
- District: Viluppuram
- Deity: Atulya Nadheswarar(Shiva)

Location
- State: Tamil Nadu
- Country: India
- Coordinates: 11°58′28″N 79°13′13″E

Architecture
- Type: Dravidian architecture

Atulya Nadheswarar Temple (Tamil: அதுல்யநாதேஸ்வரர் கோயில்) is a Hindu temple dedicated to the deity Shiva, located in Arakandanallur in Thirukoilur taluk, a town panchayat in Viluppuram district in the Indian state of Tamil Nadu. Shiva is worshipped as Atulya Nadheswarar, and is represented by the lingam. His consort Parvati is depicted as Azhagiya Ponnazhagi. The presiding deity is mentioned in the 7th century Tamil Saiva canonical work, the Tevaram, written by Tamil saint poets known as the Nayanars and classified as Paadal Petra Sthalam.

The temple complex covers two acres, built on a granite hill and it houses a seven tier gateway tower known as gopurams. The temple has a number of shrines, with those of Atulya Nadheswarar and his consort Azhagiya Ponnazhagi being the most prominent.

The original complex is believed to have been built by Pallavas, with later expansion by Cholas, while the present masonry structure was built during the Vijayanagara Empire during the 16th century. There are three rock-cut caves from the Pallava regime during the 10th century. In modern times, the temple is maintained and administered by the Hindu Religious and Charitable Endowments Department of the Government of Tamil Nadu.

== Legend ==
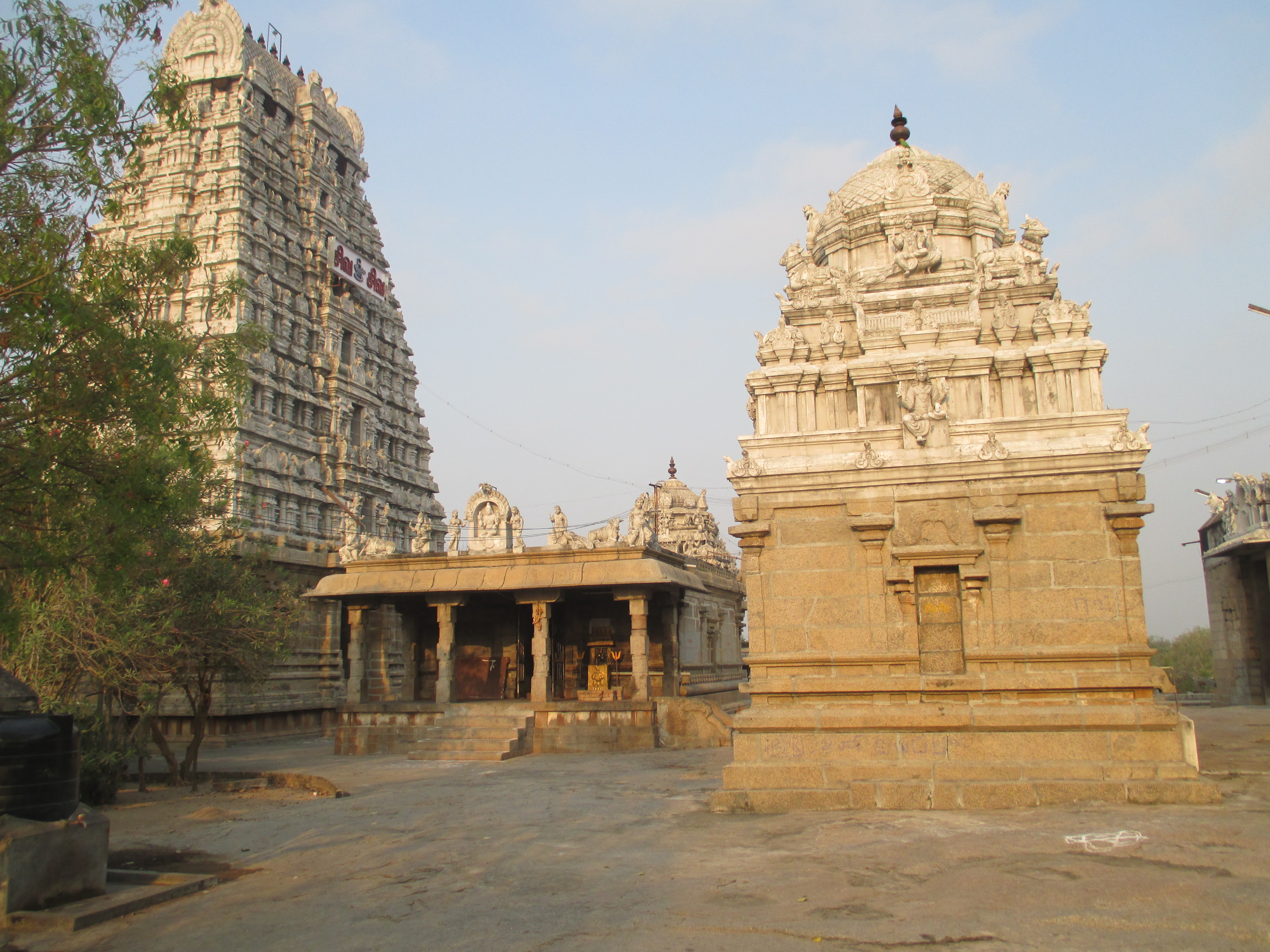
Image of the Annamalaiyar and Amman shrine of the temple

As per Hindu legend, Vishnu wanted to propitiate the sins caused by slaying Mahabali during Vamana avatar. He prayed Shiva for the same at various Shiva temples. His sins were cleared while worshipping Shiva. There is an image of Vishnu in a sculpture showing the legend. As per another legend, Sambandar, the 7th century Saiva saint Nayanmar, visited the place and sung praises of Atulya Natheswarar. The temple was locked down earlier by Jain monks and was believed to have been brought to worship practises after Sambandar. He was planning to go to Tiruvannamalai, but was stopped by a divine force. He set up Annamalaiyar as Lingam in this place and started worshiping. It is believed that Samndar's foot steps are seen at the place and the Annamalaiyar Temple at Tiruvannamali can be viewed from the point.

== History ==
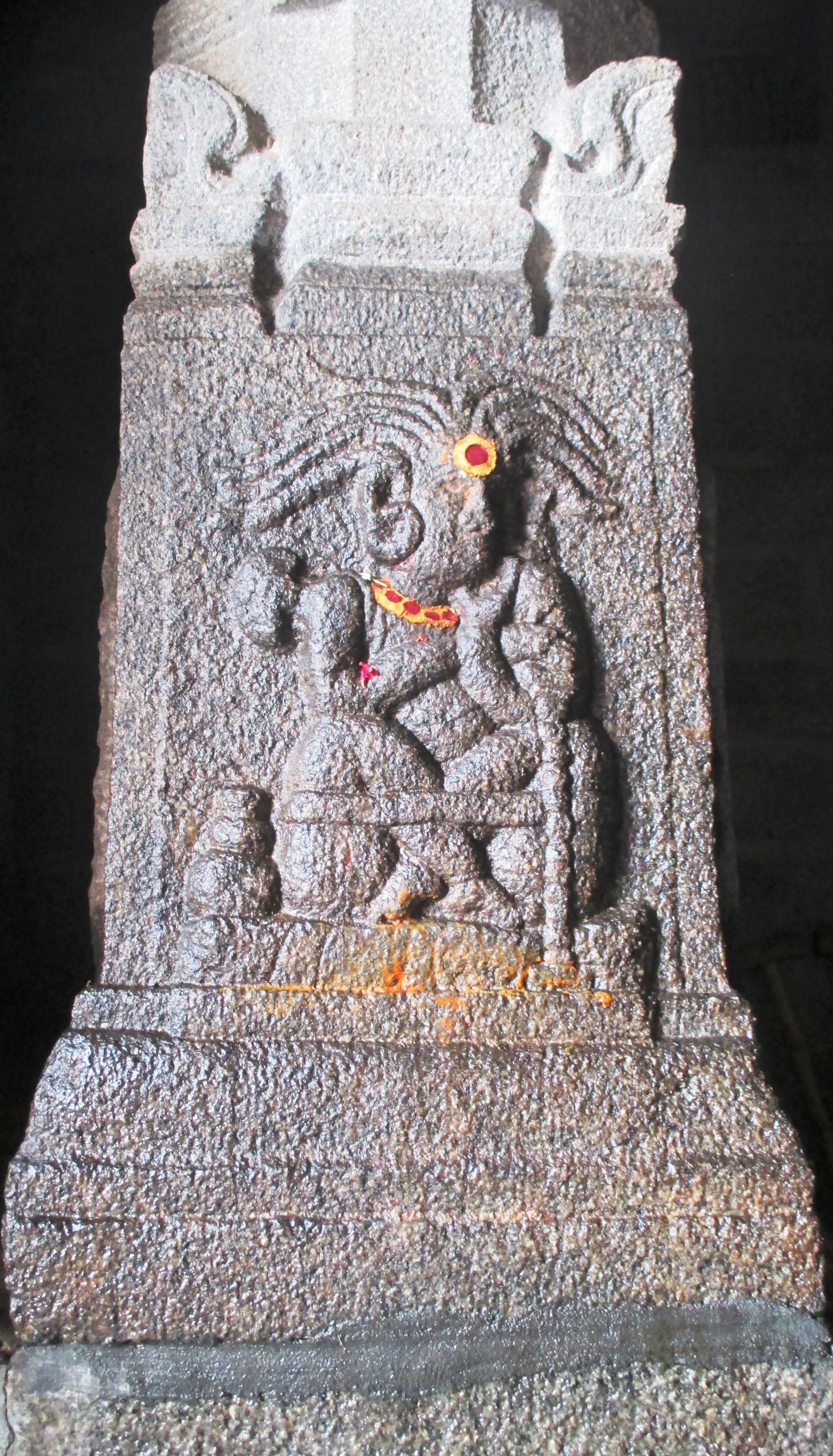
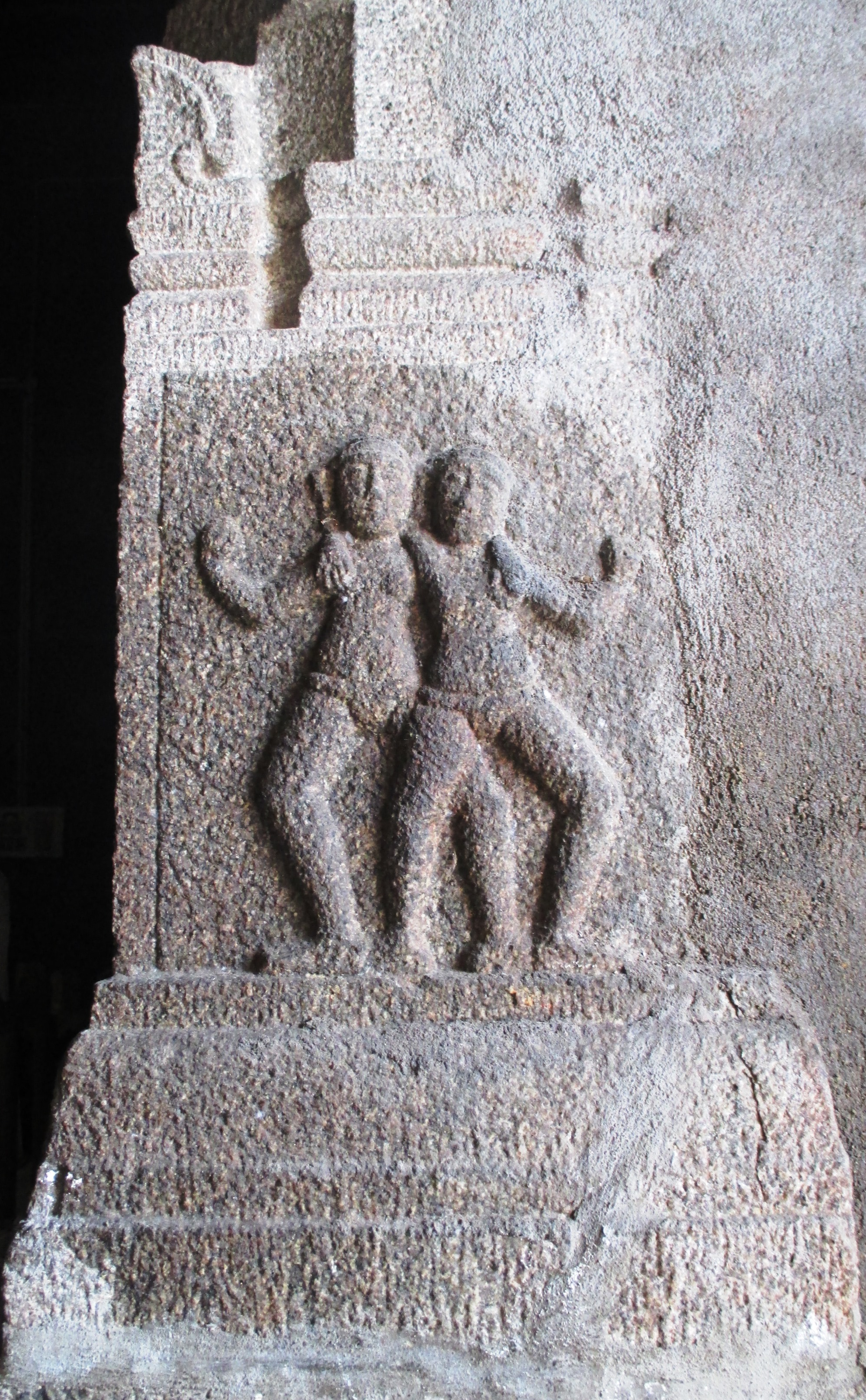
Sculptures on the temple walls

The original complex is believed to have been built by Pallavas, with later expansion by Cholas, while the present masonry structure was built during the Vijayanagara Empire during the 16th century. There are three rock-cut caves from the Pallava regime during the 10th century. The current Draupadi Amman shrine is believed to have been a Murugan temple. There are inscriptions from lot of medieval and later Chola emperors like Rajaraja Chola I (985–1014), Kulothunga Chola I (1070–1120), Vikrama Chola (1118–1135), Kulothunga Chola II (1133–1150), Rajadhiraja Chola II (1166–1178), Kulothunga Chola III (1178–1218), Rajaraja Chola III (1216–1256) and Rajendra Chola III (1246–1279). There are inscriptions from Pandya kings like Maravarman Sundara Pandyan (1216–1238) and Maarvarman Vikrama Pandiyan. The contributions of the kings of the Vijayanagara Empire like Krishna Deva Raya (1509–1529), Sadasiva Raya (1542–1570) and Kampanna Udayar are also found in the inscriptions. There are also inscriptions from the Sambuvaraya period, during the regime of Sagaloga Chadravarathi Rajanarayana Sambuvarayar. In all, there are a total of 96 inscriptions in the temple compiled in the Annual Reports on South Indian Epigraphy for the year 1902 in numbers 386–391, year 1905 number 26 and year 1935 number 111–195. Rajanarayana Sambuvaraya was a chieftain of Medieval Cholas whose contributions are documented in his inscriptions across various temples in modern-day Villupuram, Cuddalore, Tiruvannamalai and Kanchipuram districts and also in his Sanskrit work Madhuravijayam. He repaired, revived the services and inaugurated festivals of the temple. In modern times, the temple is maintained and administered by the Hindu Religious and Charitable Endowments Department of the Government of Tamil Nadu.

== Architecture ==
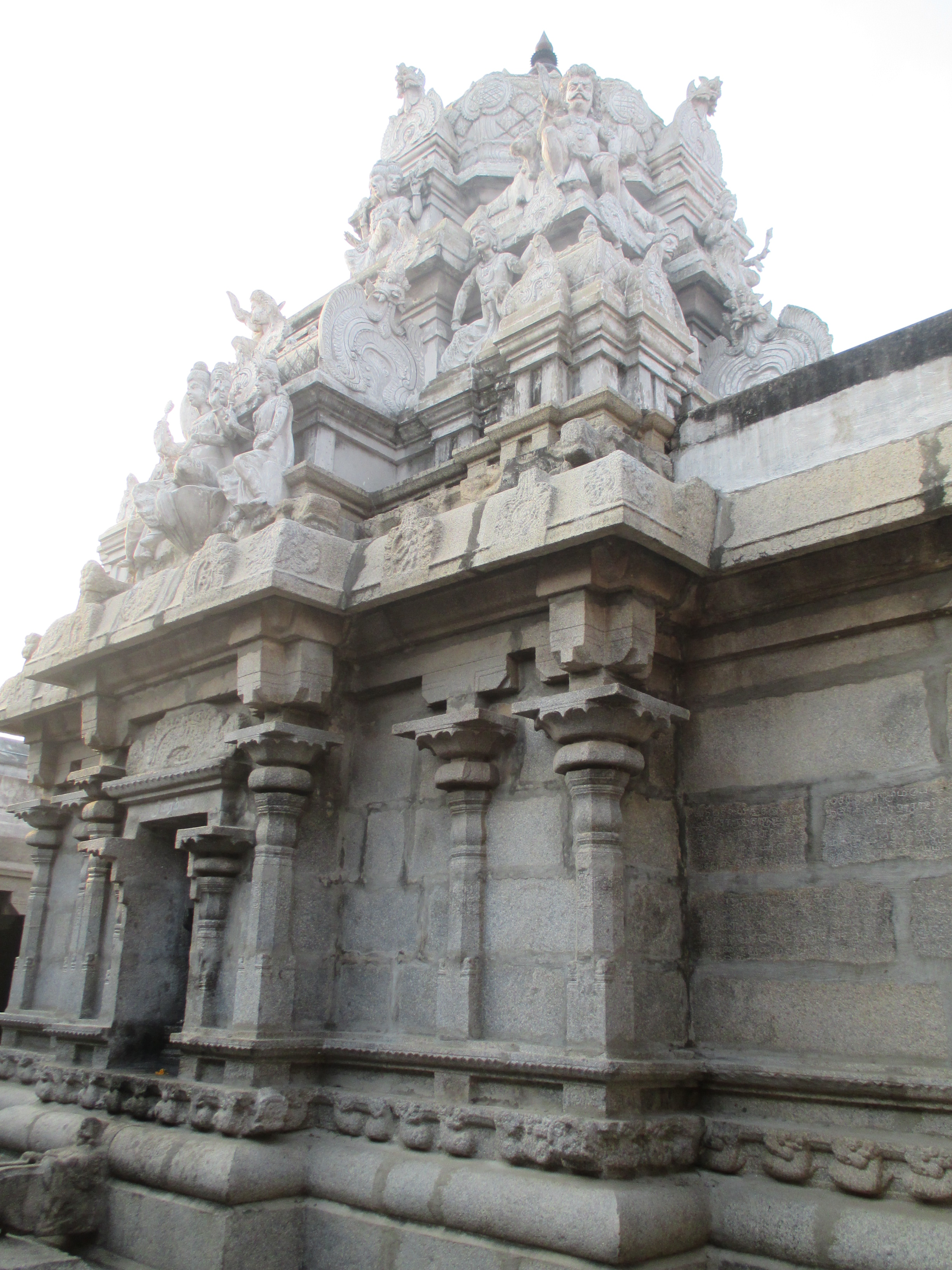
Shrine of vimana in the temple

This temple is situated in Arakandanallur, a town panchayat in Viluppuram district, located 2 km from Tirukoilur on the Tirukoilur – Viluppuram highway. The temple is located on the northern banks of Then Pennar River. The Shiva temple at Arkandanallur is spread over an area of 2 acres (8,100 m^{2}). The main rajagopuram is on the West side with seven tiers and pierces the large rectangular granite walls. The temple tank, Indra Theertha, is located 1 km (0.62 mi) from the temple. The temple is built on a granite hill and there are two corridors inside the temple. The main shrine accommodates the image of Shiva known as Atulya Nadheswarar in the form of Lingam. There is a separate shrine for Azhagiya Ponnazhagi to the right of Atulya Nadheswarar's shrine in the second precinct. The first precinct on the four sides of the sanctum sanctorum are decorated with the images of Nayanmars, Navagrahas, Bhairava, Murugan Sannadhi in the northwest and Durga Sannadhi on the northeast. The two Nandis in the temple are called Pradosha Nandi and Adigara Nandi. The rock-cut temples from the Pallava period are centred to border around the Pennar river, forming the southern extremity of the series. The Sapthamatrika images are present in the first precinct and are depicted flanking on the sides of Shiva or Vinayaga, attributing to their male counterparts.

== Religious importance ==
It is one of the shrines of the 275 Paadal Petra Sthalams – Shiva Sthalams glorified in the early medieval Tevaram poems by Tamil Saivite Nayanar Thirugnana Sambanthar. As the temple is revered in Tevaram, it is classified as Paadal Petra Sthalam, one of the 275 temples that find mention in the Saiva canon. Sambandar refers this place as Araiyinallur, which later went on to become Arkandanallur. To ease the worship of Sambandar, the Nandi, the sacred bull of Shiva, tilted a little. The two Nandis in the temple are placed slightly off axis to the sanctum to indicate the legend. Ramalinga Swamigal has stayed in this place and sung praises of Atulya Nadeswarar. The Hindu saint Ramana Maharishi is believed to have stayed in the caves in the temple and was led to Tiruvannamalai. As per Periya Puranam, the hagiography depicting the life of the 63 Nayanmars, Sambandar visited the place before moving to Tiruvannamalai.
