= Lasers in Medical Science =

- Discipline: Laser medicine
- Language: English
- Edited by: Keyvan Nouri

Publication details
- History: 1986-present
- Publisher: Springer Science+Business Media
- Frequency: Bimonthly
- Impact factor: 3.161 (2020)

Standard abbreviations
- ISO 4: Lasers Med. Sci.

Indexing
- CODEN: LMSCEZ
- ISSN: 0268-8921 (print); 1435-604X (web)

Links
- Journal homepage; Online archive

Lasers in Medical Science is a bimonthly peer-reviewed medical journal covering laser medicine. It was established in 1986 and is published by Springer Science+Business Media. It is the official journal of Sociedad Española de Láser Médico Quirúrgico, the British Medical Laser Association, the International Academy for Laser Medicine and Surgery, the European Laser Association (ELA), and the World Academy for Laser Education in Dentistry. The editor-in-chief is Keyvan Nouri (University of Miami). According to the Journal Citation Reports, the journal has a 2020 impact factor of 3.161.
