= Manju Goel =

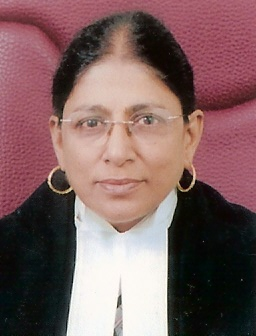

Judge, High Court of Delhi
- In office 2004–2007

Personal details
- Born: 3 January 1945 (age 81) Calcutta, West Bengal
- Education: University of Calcutta

Justice Manju Goel (born 1945) is a former judge of the High Court of Delhi. In April 1970, she became the first woman to join the West Bengal Civil Service (Judicial).

== Early life and education ==
She is the daughter of the Late Hazari Lal and Late Raj Kumari. She completed her LLB from the University of Calcutta. She also holds a master's degree in Economics from the University of Calcutta and served as a lecturer in economics for undergraduate classes and teachers' training from 1967 to 1970.

== Career ==
She joined the West Bengal Civil Service (Judicial), (Now West Bengal Judicial Service) in April 1970. She then got through Delhi Judicial Services and joined Delhi Judicial Service in May 1972. She was promoted to Delhi Higher Judicial Service in January 1986.

She was appointed as an Additional Judge of the Delhi High Court on 5 July 2004. She retired on 3 January 2007, as a judge from the High Court of Delhi.

After retirement, she was appointed a Judicial Member of the Appellate Tribunal for Electricity on 25 January 2007.

She is trained in "Gender and Law" under the aegis of the British Council. She has published papers in numerous journals and regularly contributes to the reading material prepared by the National Judicial Academy to train Judicial Officers.

She has been working as a Resource Person in the National Judicial Academy, the Delhi Judicial Academy and various other State Judicial Academies in India.

She was a former member of Central Authority of the National Legal Services Authority (NALSA) and presently she is the Chairperson of the Committee for Preparation of Training Module for Legal Services Lawyers, Para Legal Volunteers and Probation Officers.

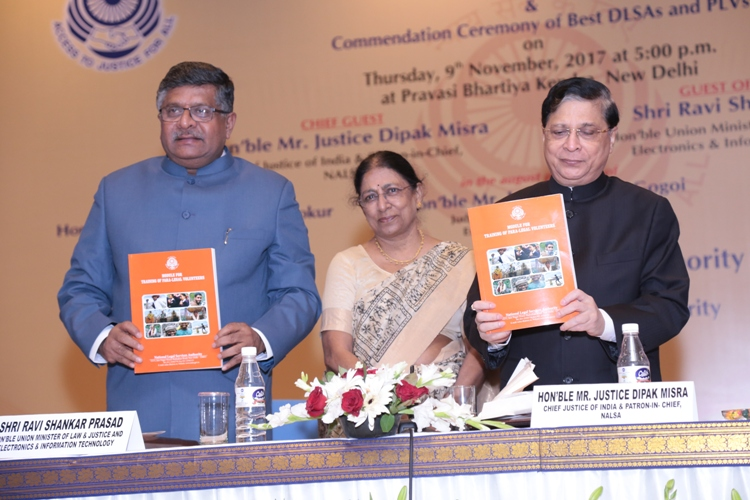
Release of Training Module for Para Legal Volunteers

NALSA has released a total of 5 Training Modules under the Chairmanship of Justice Manju Goel.

She is also an arbitrator and mediator. She is one of the panel arbitrators of the Delhi International Arbitration Centre. She is a Master Mediator on the Panel of Center for Effective Dispute Resolution, London. She is also a member of Governing Body of National Law University of Delhi and the Academic Council of National Law University, Jodhpur and member of Academic Advisory Committee of the School of Law, University of Petroleum and Energy Studies, Dehradun.
