= National Institute of Technology, Warangal =

Engineering institute in Warangal, India

National Institute of Technology Warangal
- राष्ट्रीय प्रौद्योगिकी संस्थान वारंगल
- Other names: NIT Warangal, NITW
- Former names: Regional Engineering College, Warangal
- Motto: कर्मणैव हि संसिद्धिम् in sanskrit
- Motto in English: Perfection can be attained only through action
- Type: Public Technical University
- Established: October 10, 1959; 67 years ago
- Affiliations: Ministry of Education, Government of India; AIU; AICTE
- Endowment: US$37.85 million
- Chairperson: Dr. B. V. R. Mohan Reddy
- Director: Bidyadhar Subudhi
- Academic staff: 400
- Administrative staff: 314
- Students: 7,000
- Undergraduates: 3,176 (UG program, excluding first-year intake)
- Postgraduates: (Includes PG 2-yr and PG 3-yr) totalling ~1,347
- Doctoral students: (Full-time PhD 642 + Part-time 433) = 1,075
- Location: Hanamkonda, Warangal, Telangana, India; 17.984°N 79.531°E
- Campus: 250 acres
- Website: nitw.ac.in

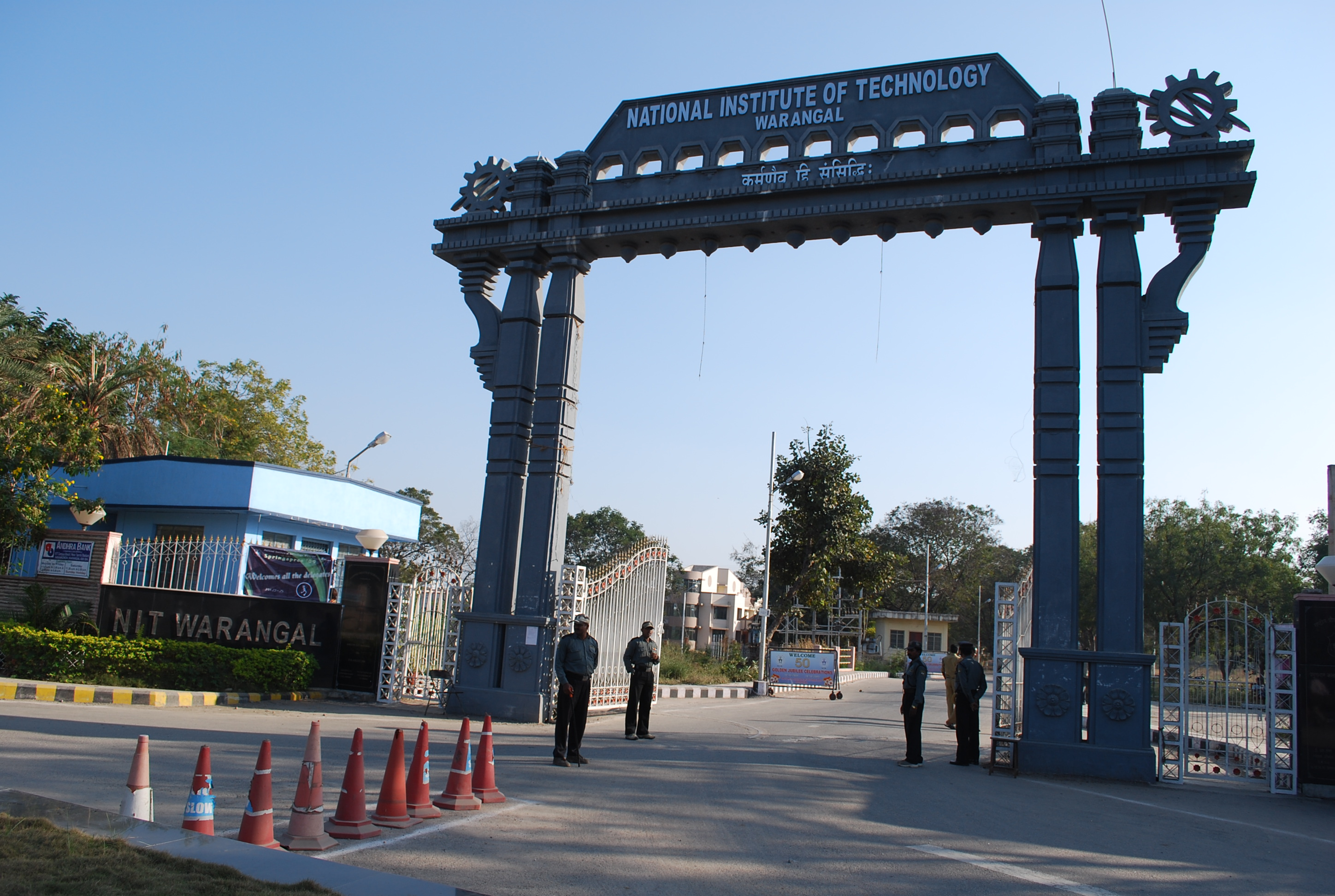
NIT Warangal Entrance Gate

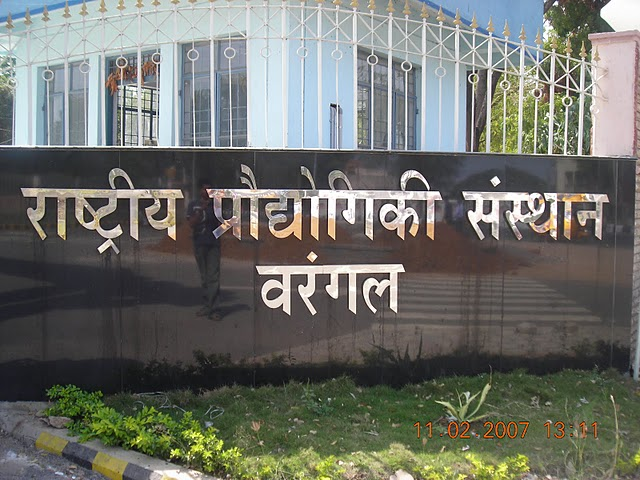
NIT Warangal Entrance Gate

The National Institute of Technology Warangal (NIT-Warangal or NIT-W) is a public technical and research university located in Warangal, India. It is recognised as an Institute of National Importance by the Government of India. The foundation stone for this institute was laid by then Prime Minister Jawaharlal Nehru on 10 October 1959, the first in the chain of 31 NITs (formerly known as RECs) in the country. The institute was renamed as the National Institute of Technology, Warangal in 2002.

== History ==
The Regional Engineering College, Warangal was the first to be established (in 1959) among the chain of 15 Regional Engineering Colleges in the country. The approval of the Government of India to establish one of the RECs meant for the southern region of Warangal was conveyed to the State Government through its letter no. F 11-5/58-T.5 dated 30 January 1959. The Government of Andhra Pradesh, through G.O. Ms. No. 2440 (Education Department) dated 15 July 1959, constituted the first Board of Governors of the Regional Engineering College, Warangal, appointing Dr. D.S. Reddy (then Vice-Chancellor of Osmania University) as the chairman.

The foundation stone for the college was laid by Jawaharlal Nehru on 10 October 1959 in Kazipet. The classes for the first batch of students in Civil, Electrical, and Mechanical Engineering branches commenced on 12 September 1959 in temporary sheds erected in the Balasamudram area of Hanamkonda. Later, temporary sheds were also erected in the Industrial Colony of Warangal for conducting lecture classes. Laboratory and workshop classes were conducted in the Government Polytechnic, Warangal in the initial stages. The conduction of classes on the premises of the permanent site in Kazipet commenced in January 1963.

The bachelor's programme in Chemical Engineering began in 1964. The following year saw the start of the Metallurgical Engineering programme. In 1971, the college began its undergraduate program in Electronics and Communication Engineering. BTech in Computer Science & Engineering was started in 1983, and MTech in Computer Science & Engineering in 1987. In 2006, the institute started a bachelor's program in Biotechnology.

In 1976, its affiliation was changed from Jawaharlal Nehru Technological University to Kakatiya University, with which it remained affiliated until the institute was granted deemed university status in 2002.

In 1994, the institute was selected by the Overseas Development Administration of the UK for exchange programs between the UK and India in the field of information technology, which ran till 1999. In 2000, the institute started its MBA program.

In 2001, a centre of Software Technology Parks of India was opened on its campus.

In September 2002, the college was renamed as National Institute of Technology, Warangal and was given deemed university status. On 15 August 2007, NITW was conferred the status of Institute of National Importance (INI) by the Government of India.

=== Recent Developments ===
- In 2014, NITW became a mentoring institute for NIT Andhra Pradesh.
- In 2019, the institute celebrated its Diamond Jubilee.
- Since 2022, major campus infrastructure upgrades have been underway, including a new academic block, hostels, and research centres.
- In 2025, the main entrance was renovated with modern architecture while retaining its iconic design.

== Campus ==
=== Dr VA Sastry Centre for Innovation and Incubation ===
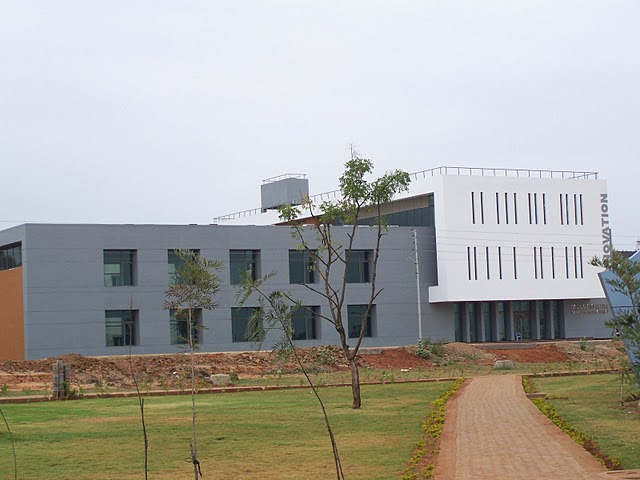
Innovation & Incubation Center

NIT Warangal has a centre established with the objective of providing laboratory space for start-up industries. Future Now Innosoft (p) ltd and Sky e it solutions have started their activities in this centre. The Lakshya Foundation, an alumni-led organization, also has its office set up here. M/s Infosys (p) ltd. funded a research project which is carried out in this centre by the faculty and students of NIT Warangal. CUSMAT, A Virtual Reality-based startup also has emerged at the Centre for Innovation and Incubation, NIT Warangal.

It also houses the Web and Software Development Cell (WSDC), a team of students which develop the institute website, semester registrations, online feedback, online attendance, online mess and hostel allotment (OMAHA) among many other things.

=== Center For Innovation And Incubation ===
The Innovation Garage is a 24x7 student-run multidisciplinary workspace for innovation. This innovators space provides students access to the latest gadgets, tools and technology devices. It is a joint initiative of the institute and Lakshya Foundation.

=== Other facilities ===
State Bank of India is situated beside the campus main gate and has two ATMs – one located in the bank premises and the other near the Sports Stadium. The institute has one shopping centre which caters to the needs of the students and residents. The campus has a post office located near Viswesvraya Hall. The NITW campus comes under a separate postal zone and it is a postal delivery office. The dispensary has an X-ray machine, an ECG and a pathology laboratory with equipment like an electronic BP apparatus with pulse reader, a mini lab, an electronic binocular microscope, and a sterilization oven.

== Academics ==
=== Admission ===
Bachelor of Technology admissions for Indian students are based on the Joint Entrance Examination (JEE – Main). Foreign students are accepted through Direct Admission of Students Abroad (DASA) and ICCR schemes.

MTech students are admitted through the Graduate Aptitude Test in Engineering (GATE). MCA students are admitted through the NIT MCA Common Entrance Test (NIMCET). Admissions to the MBA program is based on Common Admission Test (CAT) or Management Aptitude Test (MAT) scores, and short listed candidates undergo group discussion or a personal interview for the final selection. MSc and MSc (Tech.) students are admitted through Joint Admission test for Masters (JAM). Admissions in various MSc courses is also done on the basis of marks scored in JAM(Joint Admission test for MSc) through CCMN.

NIT Warangal invites applications for PhD degree admissions in almost all departments twice every academic year, in July and December.

- NIT Warangal offers multiple entry paths across its programmes:*

Programme	Admission Process
BTech (UG)	Based on **JEE Main** scores, followed by **JoSAA/CSAB counselling**.
MTech (PG)	Through the **GATE** qualification; selections finalized via **CCMT/Institute rounds**.
MBA	Based on **CAT** or **MAT** scores, followed by **GD/PI** as part of the final selection.
MSc / MSc (Tech)	Admission through **IIT JAM**, including via **CCMN** portal.
MCA	Through **NIMCET** scores via **CCMN**.
PhD	Admissions twice a year (**July** and **December** sessions), based on a **written institute-level test** followed by interview.

=== Rankings ===
University rankings

General – India
- NIRF (Overall) (2024): 53

Engineering – India
- NIRF (2024): 21

NIT Warangal was ranked 21st among engineering colleges in India by the National Institutional Ranking Framework (NIRF) in 2024 and 53rd overall.

National and International Rankings of NIT Warangal
Year	Ranking System	Category / Subject	Rank / Band	Reference
2024	NIRF	Overall	53	"2024 NIRF Ranking" (PDF).
2024	NIRF	Engineering	21	"2024 NIRF Ranking" (PDF).
2025	THE World University Rankings	Overall	1201–1500	"NIT Warangal – THE World University Rankings 2025".
2025	THE World University Rankings	Engineering	1001–1250	"NIT Warangal – THE Engineering Rankings 2025".
2025	EduRank	Overall	2583	"EduRank 2025 – NIT Warangal".
2025	EduRank	Engineering	1095 (World), 385 (Asia), 43 (India)	"EduRank 2025 – NIT Warangal Engineering".
2025	QuantumHE (Aggregate Rankings)	Overall (Average)	~1400 (across CWUR, CWTS Leiden, THE, SCImago, Webometrics, UniRanks)	"QuantumHE Global Rankings – NIT Warangal".

== Student life ==
=== Festivities ===
NIT Warangal hosts a calendar of technical, cultural, and management events annually, drawing high student participation and industry interest.

NIT Warangal holds technical and cultural events throughout the year. Major annual events include Technozion (technical fest), SpringSpree (cultural fest) and Cura (management fest). The event called Zero Gravity is held every year, which is an interbranch competition in cultural events.

Event	Type	Highlights	Approx. Footfall / Participation	Reference
Technozion	Technical fest	South India's largest technical fest; 60+ events, workshops, guest lectures, exhibitions.	—	"Technozion – Largest Technical Fest in South India".: Technozion; Technozion is a three-day annual technical symposium organized by the student fraternity of the National Institute of Technology, Warangal, and is aimed at providing a platform for students across India to assemble, interact, and share knowledge in various fields of science and technology. Started in 2006, it has a footfall of over 6000 students. It is a collection of events, initiatives, workshops, guest lectures, and exhibitions. Its name comes from "techno" for technology and "Zion" meaning the promised land.
SpringSpree	Cultural fest	One of South India's oldest and largest cultural fests; talent shows, workshops, pronites with celebrated artists.	~10,000 visitors; ~600 colleges	[[[SpringSpree]] "SpringSpree – Attendance & History"]. "SpringSpree 2025 Promises Spectacle".: Springspree; Springspree is an annual cultural festival of the National Institute of Technology, Warangal. It is organized by the student fraternity of NIT Warangal. This cultural fest has a footfall of around 10,000 and participation of around 600 colleges. It started in 1978.[[[SpringSpree]] "SpringSpree – Attendance & History"]. "SpringSpree 2025 Promises Spectacle".
CURA	Management fest	National-level management fest founded in 2009; diverse business competitions and strategy games.	10,000+ footfall; 50+ colleges	"CURA Statistics, 2025". Cura is a momentous management event organised by the students of School of Management, NIT Warangal. Cura signifying "Thoughtfulness" is a platform that started to unleash the potential of the management aspirants all over India. The aim of the event is to elucidate the major business activities through different events thus to elicit the diverse resp onses from the rapt and admiring students of management. Event is a beacon of light for all those who can balance and blend their skills with palatable and innovative ideas accompanied with verve.
Zero Gravity	Inter-branch cultural competition	Annual intra-college cultural contest showcasing creativity between departments.	—	[[[National Institute of Technology, Warangal#Student life]] "Festivities Overview"].
Tech–Cultural Confluence	Combo fest	A recent innovation offering both technical competitions and cultural performances under one roof.	—	[November 2024, NITW newsletter]

== Notable alumni ==
- Cherukuri Rajkumar (Azad), former Spokesperson and member of the politburo of the Communist Party of India (Maoist).
- Nambala Keshava Rao, former General Secretary of Communist Party of India (Maoist)
- Sadanala Ramakrishna, former head of the Central Technical Committee of the Communist Party of India (Maoist)
- Padma Kuppa, State Representative of Michigan's 41st House of Representatives district in the United States
- Pushmeet Kohli, Head of Research at Google DeepMind, highly cited researcher in machine learning and computer vision
- Sujatha Gidla, Author
- Siva S. Banda, Director of Control Science Center of Excellence and Chief Scientist for Air Vehicles Directorate at United States Air Force Research Laboratory; elected to National Academy of Engineering; President's Award for Distinguished Federal Civilian Service in 2010
- Lalit Goel, Professor of Electrical Engineering, Nanyang Technological University
- V. V. Lakshminarayana, former Joint Director for India's Central Bureau of Investigation
- Kavuri Sambasiva Rao, Member of Parliament, India (5th term, 8th, 9th, 12th, 14th, 15th Lok Sabha)
- Madhura Sreedhar Reddy, director and producer in Telugu cinema
- S. P. Y. Reddy, Member of Parliament, India (second term; 14th and 15th Lok Sabha)
- Rao Remala, first Indian employee of Microsoft
- Ramajogayya Sastry, film lyricist and winner of the Filmfare Award for Best Lyricist – Telugu
- Biswanath Rath, film director, screenwriter, editor and producer
- Sudhir Kumar Mishra, Director General of the Defence Research & Development Organisation (DRDO)
- Kartikeya Gummakonda, Actor
- Shreya Dhanwanthary, Actress

== See also ==
- List of educational institutions in Telangana
- List of institutions of higher education in Telangana
- List of National Institutes of Technology in India
