= Yog Raj Sharma =

Indian ophthalmologist

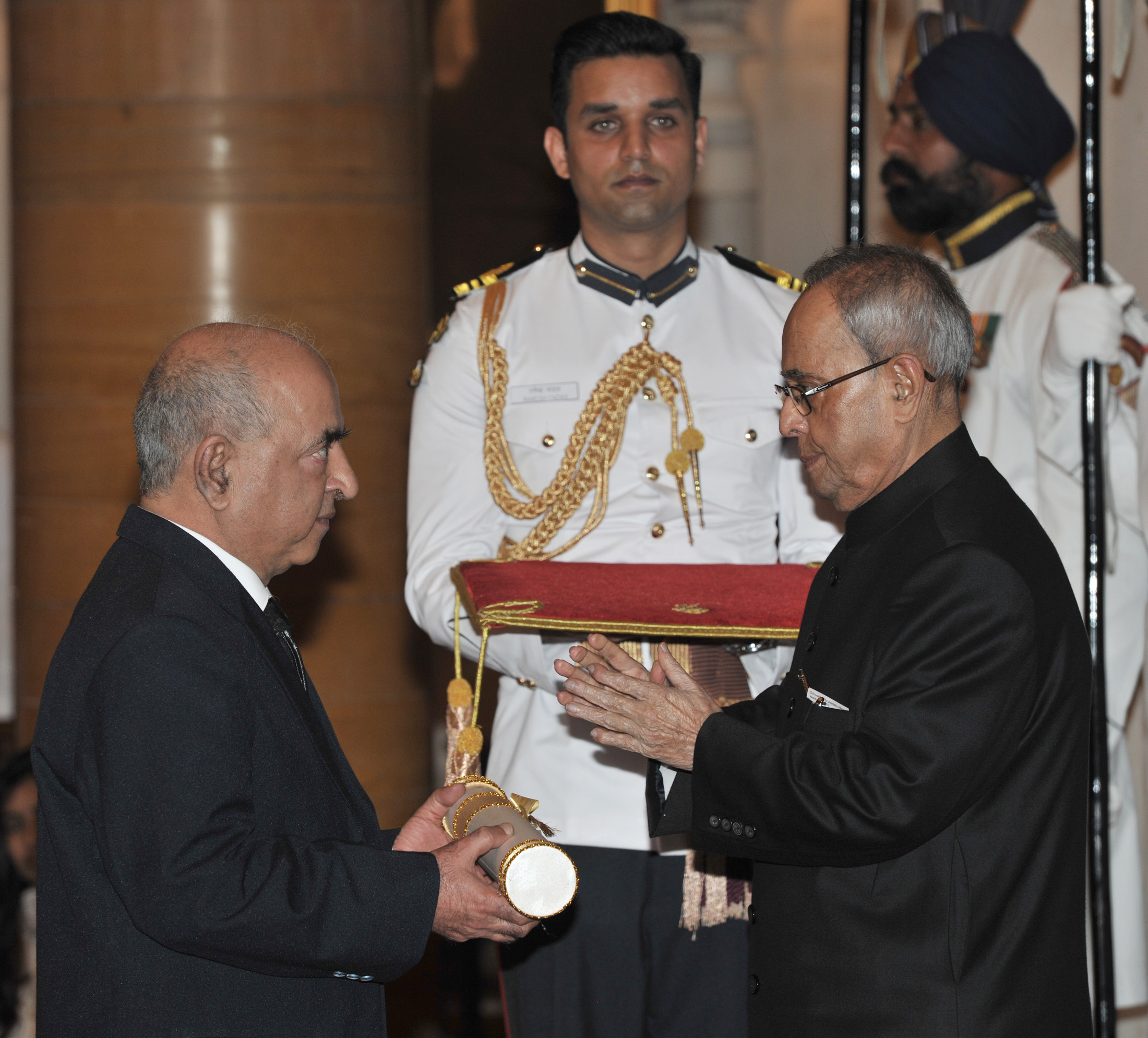
- President Pranab Mukherjee presenting the Padma Shri Award to Yog Raj Sharma in 2015
- Born: 16 December 1950 (age 75); Jammu, Jammu and Kashmir, India
- Occupation: Ophthalmologist
- Years active: Since 1979
- Known for: Vitreo-retinal surgery
- Awards: Padma Shri; AAO Academic Achievement Award; AAO Front Row Surgical Video Award

Yog Raj Sharma is an Indian ophthalmologist and ex-chief of Dr. Rajendra Prasad Centre for Ophthalmic Sciences of the All India Institute of Medical Sciences (AIIMS), New Delhi, the apex body of the National Programme for the Control of Blindness, a Government of India initiative to reduce the prevalence of blindness in India. He is the Chairman of the Task Force on Prevention and Control of Diabetic Retinopathy Group and the Co-Chairman of the National Task Force on Prevention of Blindness from Retinopathy of Prematurity under the Ministry of Health and Family Welfare of the Government of India. An advisor to the Ministry of Health and Family Welfare, India. Sharma was honored by the Government of India in 2015 with Padma Shri, the fourth highest Indian civilian award. In 2005, Yog Raj Sharma's published article on "Pars plana vitrectomy vs scleral buckling in rhegmatogenous retinal detachment" in Acta Ophthalmologica Scandinavica and in November 2021, American society of retina specialists cited it as top 100 publications on retinal detachment management in the last ~121 years. Of these top hundred publications, only nineteen countries contributed, three of the contributing countries were Asian and from India this study was the sole contribution. Dr Sharma called it 'the singular biggest achievement of his career" in an article published in Daily Excelsior, Jammu in December 2021.

== Biography ==
Yog Raj Sharma was born in Jammu in the North Indian state of Jammu and Kashmir, and did his early schooling at Government Sri Ranbir Model Higher Secondary School, Jammu. He graduated in medicine (MBBS Hons) from the University of Kolkata in 1974 and secured a master's degree (MS) from the Post Graduate Institute of Medical Education and Research, (PGIMER) Chandigarh in 1978 where he did his senior residency for a year. He went to USA in 1979 to pursue higher studies, obtained a degree from the Educational Commission for Foreign Medical Graduates (ECFMG) in 1979 and continued there till 1982 as a member of faculty of ophthalmology and visual sciences at Yale University School of Medicine. The next assignment was as a faculty member at the University of Maryland Hospital, Baltimore where he stayed till 1984. He returned to India and, in 1985, he took up the position of the assistant director at the Indian Council of Medical Research. In 1986, he joined the Vitreo-Retina Unit of Dr. R. P. Centre at AIIMS and became the professor of VR Surgery in 2002.

Sharma is the Chief of Dr. R. P. Centre for Ophthalmic Sciences since 2012 and has held the position of a professor at the Faculty of Medicine and Health Sciences, United Arab Emirates University since 1992, reportedly the first ophthalmologist to be appointed at the university. He heads two Government of India initiatives, the Task Force on Prevention and Control of Diabetic Retinopathy Group as its chairman and the National Task Force on Prevention of Blindness from Retinopathy of Prematurity as its co-chairman. He also serves as an advisor to the Ministry of Health and Family Welfare and as a director of the South East Asia Centre for Ophthalmology of the World Health Organization.

== Legacy and achievements ==
Sharma, who is known to have introduced many innovations in vitreo-retinal surgery, have trained many professionals in the procedure in India and abroad and is credited with the performance of over 20,000 surgeries. He has published 193 medical papers in national and international peer reviewed journals and holds a ResearchGate score of 34.86, putting him in the upper 8 percent of the online repository publications, with his citation index standing above 1000. He has authored eleven books and has contributed 46 chapters in books published by other authors. The Year Book of Ophthalmology carries 2 chapters and four abstracts written by Sharma. He was also involved in many clinical trials conducted in India.

Sharma has presented papers at 229 national and international conferences including the first international meeting on Light and Oxygen Toxicity to the Eye and has a scientific exhibit displayed at the American Academy of Ophthalmology. He was an invited guest speaker at the Annual Conference of American Academy of Ophthalmology, San Francisco in 2006 and 2009 where he delivered lectures on Minimally Invasive Vitreous Surgery: Sutureless 20, 23 and 25 Gauge System, Silicon Oil in Vitreo-Retinal Surgery and Wide Angle Vitreous Surgery. He is a peer reviewer for many international scientific journals and publications such as American Journal of Ophthalmology, Indian Journal of Ophthalmology, British Journal of Medical Groups, British Journal of Ophthalmology, Paediatric Ophthalmology and Strabismus 2010 and has been the chief editor of Jaypee's Video Atlas of Vitreo-Retinal Surgery (with 12 DVD Roms).

== Positions and awards ==
He is a life member of American Academy of Ophthalmology, All India Ophthalmological Society, Delhi Ophthalmological Society, National Society for the Prevention of Blindness, Ocular Trauma Society of India, Glaucoma Society of India and Vitreo-retinal society of India. He is also a member of New York Academy of Sciences, AIIMS Ophthalmic Research Association, AAO International Faculty Registry, and AAO Eye Care Volunteer Registry. Marquis Who's Who in Medicine and Healthcare carried his name in its 2002-13 editions.

Sharma received Front Row Surgical Video Award in 2008 and Academic Achievement Award in 2009 from the American Academy of Ophthalmology. The Government of India included him the Republic Day honours list, in 2015, for the civilian award of Padma Shri.
