= Atulya Ghosh =

Indian politician

- Born: 28 August 1904; Jejur, Bengal Presidency, British India
- Died: 18 April 1986 (aged 81); Kolkata, West Bengal, India
- Occupation: Political leader
- Spouse: Bibhabati Devi

Atulya Ghosh (28 August 1904 – 18 April 1986) was a Bengali Indian politician. He has been described as "a wise, scholarly and honest leader who was a superb political organizer. "

== Formative years ==
He was born in a Kayastha Family on 28 August 1904. The family hailed from Jejur in Hooghly district. In the early 1920s, he quit studies to become a Congress khadi (hand spun cloth became a symbol of self-reliance) worker.

He was a member first of the Calcutta and then Hooghly district Congress committees. During this period he also came in contact with Bhupendranath Dutta. According to his own admission in his autobiography (Kashtokalpito) he was fully converted to the Gandhian mode of struggle by Bijoy Krishna Modak, a well known philanthropist and Congress organizer of the Hooghly district who would later join the Communist Party of India. According to him, he started out on his political career as a "grassroots" worker with one of his first duties being carrying ladders and putting up political posters (Kashtokalpito). In 1930, he was arrested as a suspect in the murder case of a policeman in Midnapore but was released because of lack of evidence. He had to go underground for some time as during this period the British government of India used various acts to justify physical repression or elimination of political activists not necessarily involved in armed movements. (autobiography - Kashtokalpito). He spent two years hiding out with the family of a fisherman sharing their life (Kashtokalpito). During the Quit India movement of 1942 he was arrested and lost one eye in jail, as a result of police action on detainees inside the jail on protest strike when a baton was inserted into one eye. During the same period he contracted spinal tuberculosis and had to be hospitalized. He suffered from mis-advertent administration of drugs while in jail, but reportedly officially forgave the British surgeon in charge when the latter apologized (autobiography - Kashtokalpito). On his release he was diagnosed with severe malnutrition and was instructed to maintain a minimal body weight by the reputed physician and Congress leader and the second Chief minister of West Bengal of independent India, Dr. Bidhan Chandra Roy (autobiography-Kashtakalpito). He became editor of the weekly Janasevak in 1945. It was converted to a daily in 1949.

For some time he worked in the Hooghly bank, founded by the Congress leader Dhirendra Nath Mukherjee. In 1947, he organized a Congress Seva Dal camp at Howrah station to assist elderly AICC members.

== At the helm ==
In 1948, he became general secretary of the West Bengal state Congress committee, assuming charge as its president two years later. He joined the Congress Working Committee in 1950. In 1952 he was elected to the Lok Sabha from Bardhaman, and in 1957 and 1962 from Asansol. In 1967, he lost from the Bankura (Lok Sabha constituency).

He also served as the treasurer of the AICC for some time. He lent his support for the selection of Lal Bahadur Shastri as prime minister after Nehru’s death and then of Indira Gandhi. When the Congress old guard fell off with Indira Gandhi, he was with them as part of what was called the ‘syndicate’ and then formed Indian National Congress (Organisation).

== Retirement days ==
In 1971, he retired from politics and led an active life spending much of his time founding and organizing the B.C.Roy Memorial Committee under whose auspices land was acquired in eastern Kolkata to form a children's garden and activity centre named the Bidhan Shishu Udyan. Although detached from active politics, he maintained friendly relations with many of his former political colleagues, such as Neelam Sanjiva Reddy, who visited the Udyan when he was the President of India. Although he used to be heavily criticized by the communists and socialists in his active days, it was the Communist Party of India (Marxist) leader Benoy Choudhury, who often met him in his retirement days.

== Works ==
- Patrabali
- Kastakalpito
- Sampradayik Samasya
- Nairajyabadir Dristite Gandhiji
- Ahimsa and Gandhi
