= Lalit Goel =

Dr. Lalit Goel (born 1960) is a Professor and the Head of the Division of Power Engineering at the School of Electrical and Electronic Engineering (EEE), Nanyang Technological University (NTU). He is a Senior Member of the IEEE and received the IEEE Power Engineering Society (Singapore Chapter)'s Outstanding Engineer Award in 2000. He is also concurrently the Dean of Admissions of the university.

== Early life and accolades ==
Goel is a native of New Delhi, India. He completed his undergraduate studies in Electrical Engineering from Regional Engineering College, Warangal (now National Institute of Technology, Warangal) in India and obtained his PhD from Canada's University of Saskatchewan in 1991. The university offered him a teaching position, but he declined it because his wife could not tolerate the cold Canadian winters. Instead, he chose to come to NTU.

His first lecture in NTU had 450 students, which was much larger than the classes of about 60 students he used to teach. He now teaches up to 1,000 students per lecture.

In NTU, his students remembered him for his style of teaching, as well as his distinctive moustache and bald pate. He had started losing his hair from the age of 18; according to him, the baldness might be hereditary.

In addition to his IEEE award, Goel had won 15 Teacher of the Year Awards in his time at NTU.

== YouTube video ==
In 2006, Goel became a YouTube celebrity after someone uploaded a five-minute snippet of one of his lectures to the site, in which he mentioned humorous comments about him made by second-year students who had attended his circuit analysis classes. These comments were written in feedback forms which asked students to rate their lecturers and give feedback on how their teaching could be improved. Such comments included:

Attending your lectures is like watching Indian Die Hard and Indian Bruce Willis.

Roses are red, violets are blue, the lesser your hair, the sexier you get!

Is your moustache the source of your knowledge? If it is, then please don't set difficult questions because most of us don't have moustaches.

Goel had collated the humorous quotes into a series of slides. During one of his lectures, he showed these slides to his students and later uploaded the video of the lecture to NTU's e-learning website, from where it found its way to YouTube.

On Deepavali in 2006, Goel received an email from an old student who had noticed him on YouTube. He did not take much notice of it, but many such messages followed and he became known even on campus as "the YouTube guy". As of end-December 2007, the video had had 440,000 views on YouTube. Although Goel was initially worried that whoever had uploaded the video to YouTube might be disciplined by the school administration, they liked the video and praised him for being entertaining.
