= Atul Kumar Goel =

Seasoned banker

- Education: Institute of Chartered Accountants of India
- Occupation: Banker
- Title: MD and CEO, Punjab National Bank
- Term: January 2022 – December 2024

Atul Kumar Goel is an Indian businessman. He was the Managing Director and Chief Executive Officer of Punjab National Bank. He is a former Chief Executive Officer and Managing Director of UCO bank. He has also worked in Allahabad Bank.

== Early life ==
Goel got a degree from The Institute of Chartered Accountants of India.

== Career ==
Goel started his career in 1992 as a Chartered Accountant in Allahabad Bank. In 2016, he joined Union bank as an executive director after which in 2018 he was appointed as the MD of UCO Bank. In 2021, he joined Punjab National Bank as the Managing Director and Chief Executive Officer. He is also the Chairman of the Indian Bank's Association (IBA). He is a Director on the Board of The New India Assurance Co. Ltd. He is also a member of Governing Council & Chairman of the Executive Committee of the Indian Institute of Banking & Finance (IIBF).
