= Atul Kumar (chemist) =

Indian chemist

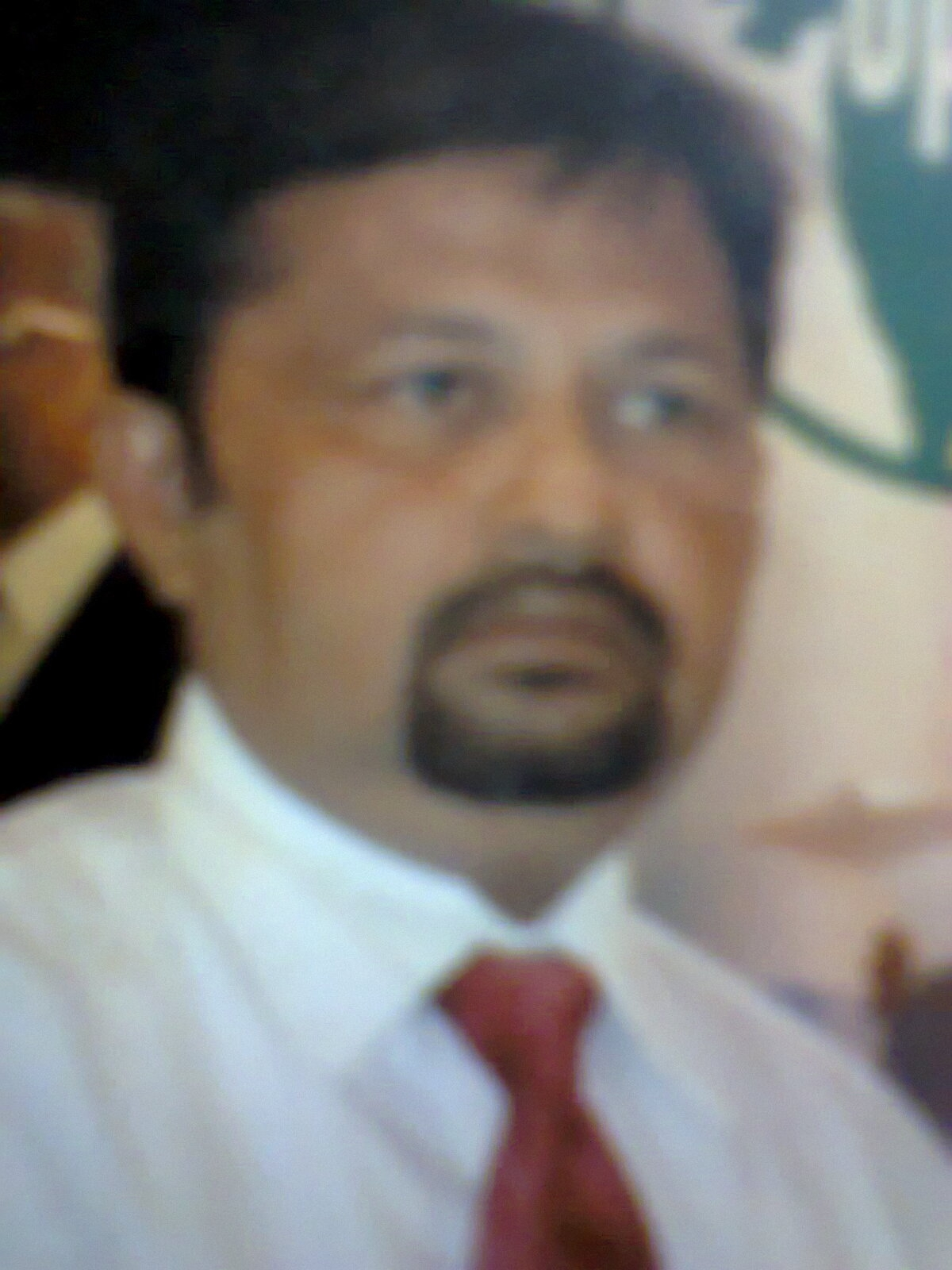
Dr. Atul Kumar

Atul Kumar is a synthetic organic chemist, Professor & Chief Scientist at the Academy of Scientific and Innovative Research (AcSIR) and Chairperson of Medicinal and Process Chemistry Division Central Drug Research Institute (CSIR-CDRI) at Lucknow, India and a Dean at National Institute of Pharmaceutical Education and Research, Raebareli.

== Academic work ==
Kumar has about 24 years experience in drug design, medicinal chemistry and Green Chemistry

Dr. Kumar's major contributions are the invention of anti-osteoporosis drug candidate CDRI-99/373 (CENTHANK), which is an currently in phase 1 clinical trial and NCE anti-cancer compound CDRI-S-007-1235, is currently in Pre-clinical stage.
