= Piyush Goel =

Indian writer

- Born: 13 June 1964 (age 62); Uttar Pradesh, India
- Education: Gandhi Polytechnic
- Occupations: Writer, Record holder
- Notable work: Mirror image versions of Madhushala, Durga Saptashati, Bhagavad Gita, Meri Ikyavan Kavitayein, Gitanjali, Ramcharitmanas
- Awards: Holder Republic Award
- Website: Official website

Piyush Goel (born 1967) also referred as Mirror Image Man in the media, is an Indian writer, author, and world record holder, known for writing books in mirror image style.

== Career ==
In 2012, he set the record by writing World's First Needle Book Madhushala of Harivansh Rai Bachchan by using needle in mirror image. World Records India certified his record on 2 August 2011 for his mirror image rendering of the Bhagavad Gita. His was the first mirror image version of the Bhagavad Gita, according to the Hindustan Times. Goel is the recipient of Holder Republic Award.

Piyush wrote 16 books in mirror image style between 2003 and 2015, the Bhagavad Gita, Sundara Kanda from Ramcharitmanas, Sai Satcharitra, Durga Saptashati, and Meri Ikyavan Kavitayein by Atal Bihari Vajpayee, the former Prime Minister of India. He also wrote a book that contains 110 motivational quotes, Sochana to Padega Hi. His three mathematics papers were published in International Research Journal.
