= Antpur =

- Village
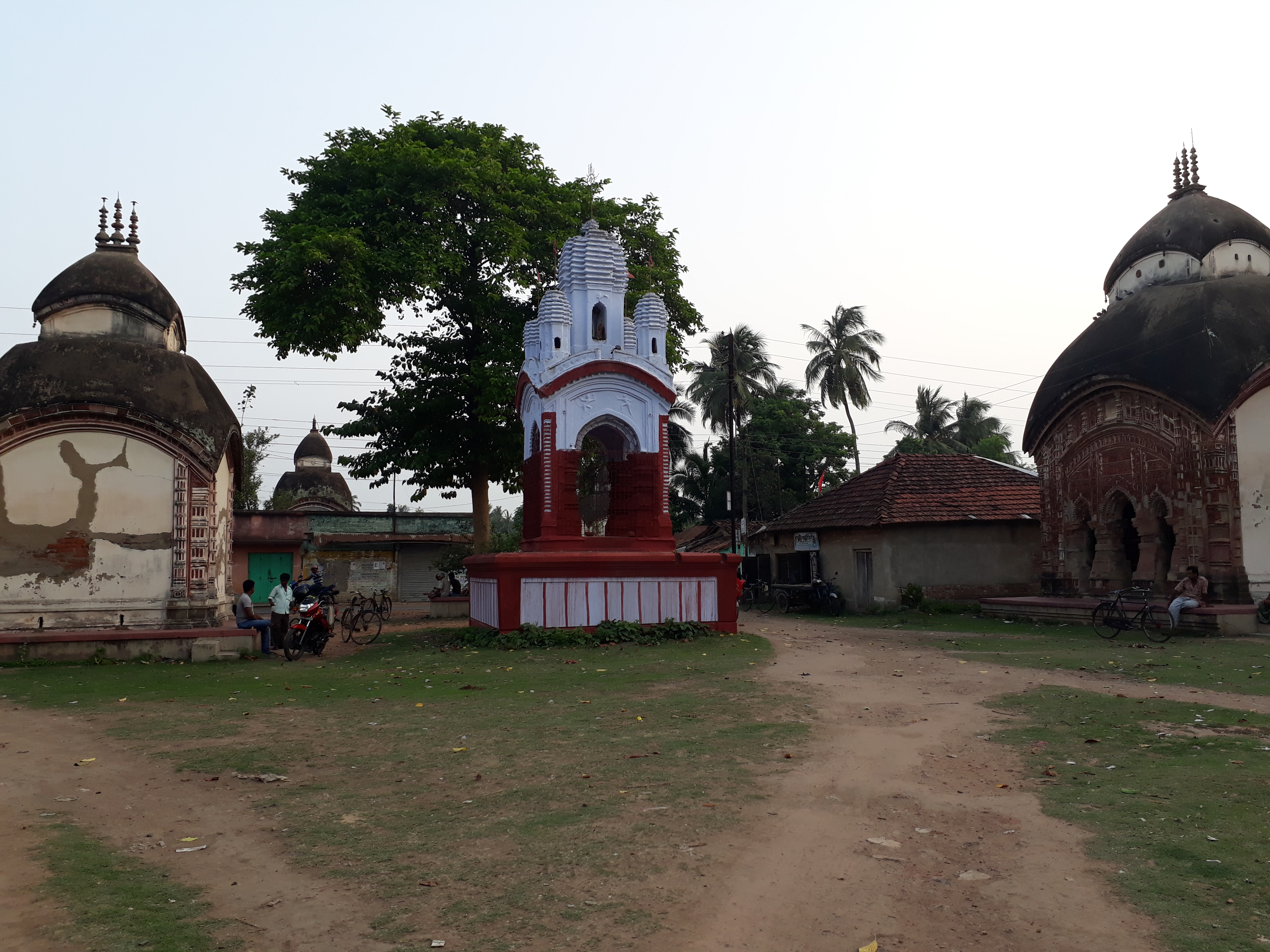
- Temples and Dolmancha at Antpur

- Location in West Bengal, India Antpur (India)
- Coordinates: 22.7834°N 88.0436°E
- Country: India
- State: West Bengal
- District: Hooghly

Government
  - Body: Gram panchayat

Languages
  - Official: Bengali, English
- Time zone: UTC+5:30 (IST)
- PIN: 712424
- Telephone code: 91 3212 25
- ISO 3166 code: IN-WB

Antpur is a village in the Jangipara community development block of the Srirampore subdivision in the Hooghly District in the Indian state of West Bengal. It is around 20 kilometres (12 mi) from Tarakeswar. The nearest railway station is Haripal. Antpur is famous for its Boro Maa Kali Puja every year on Bhoot Chaturdashi tithi, when lakhs of devotees gather in the village for the festival.

== History ==
One of the most important and famous festivals of Antpur is the Shri Shri Boro Kali Mata Puja (or simply Boro Maa Kali Puja) at Boro Maa Kali Tola, Anarbati, Antpur. It is a puja 300 to 400 years old. Legends say that when cholera epidemic had spread throughout Antpur and its surrounding regions, a saint who appeared out of nowhere suggested worshipping the goddess Kali under the name Boro Maa, meaning "big/eldest mother". The puja was held at the Bandopadhyay house; after it was completed, Antpur and its surrounding regions were free from the disease. Since then, this puja has been celebrated in the village. It takes place one day before Kartik Amavasya, when Kali Puja or Shyama Puja is normally celebrated, on Bhoot Chaturdashi tithi.

Boro Maa Kali's idol has two hands holding a Kharga and a Rakta patra. Later, along with Boro Maa, Mejo Maa, Choto Maa, Nyara Maa and Kantamani Kali were also worshipped who are known as the part or sisters of Boro Maa Kali. Boro Maa is considered the guardian and protector of Antpur. Apart from Bhoot Chaturdashi tithi, she is worshipped in the form of ghot every day in the Bandopadhyay house.

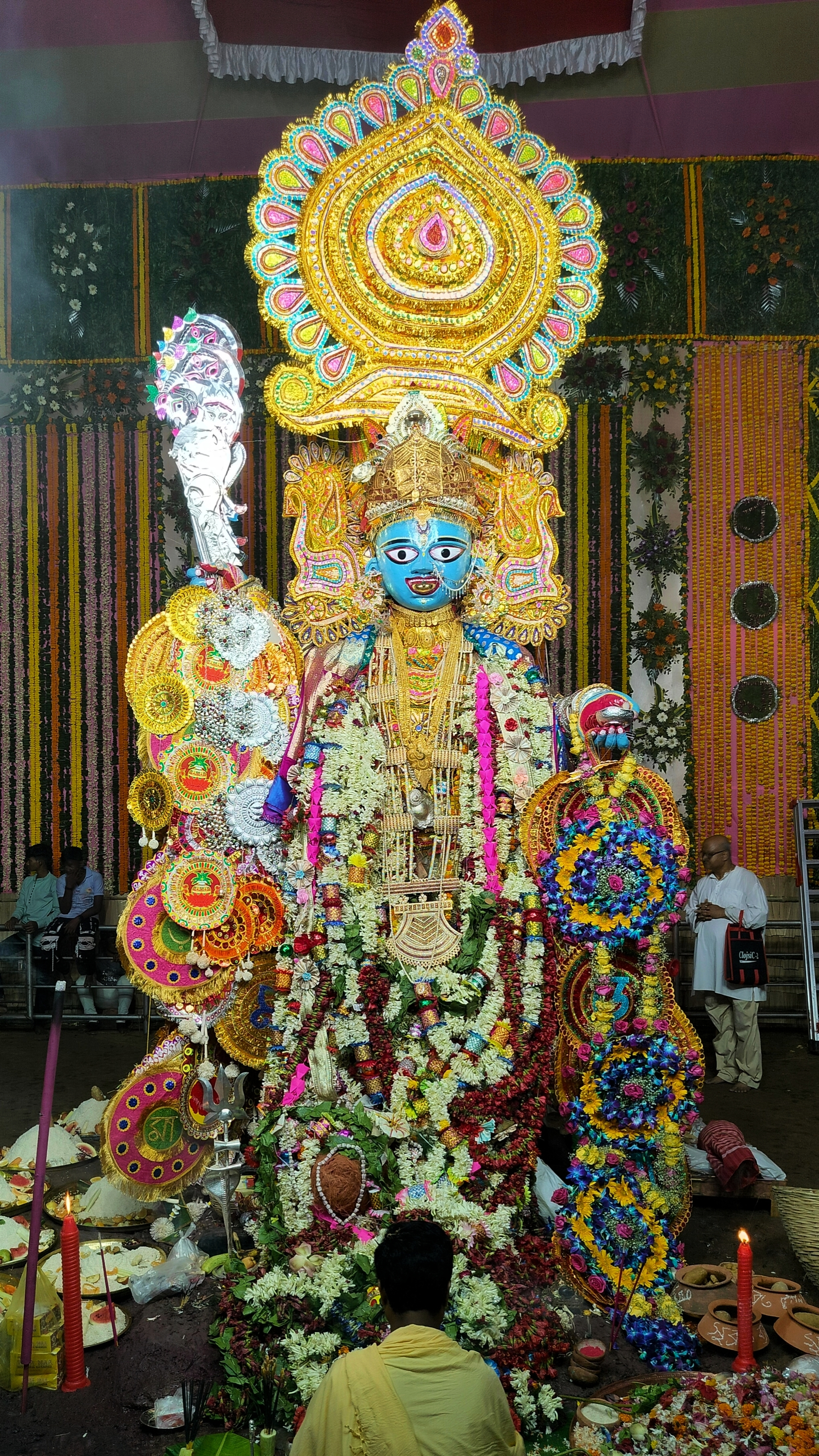
Image of Boro Maa Kali of Antpur, on her mud altar, which is believed to have miraculous power.

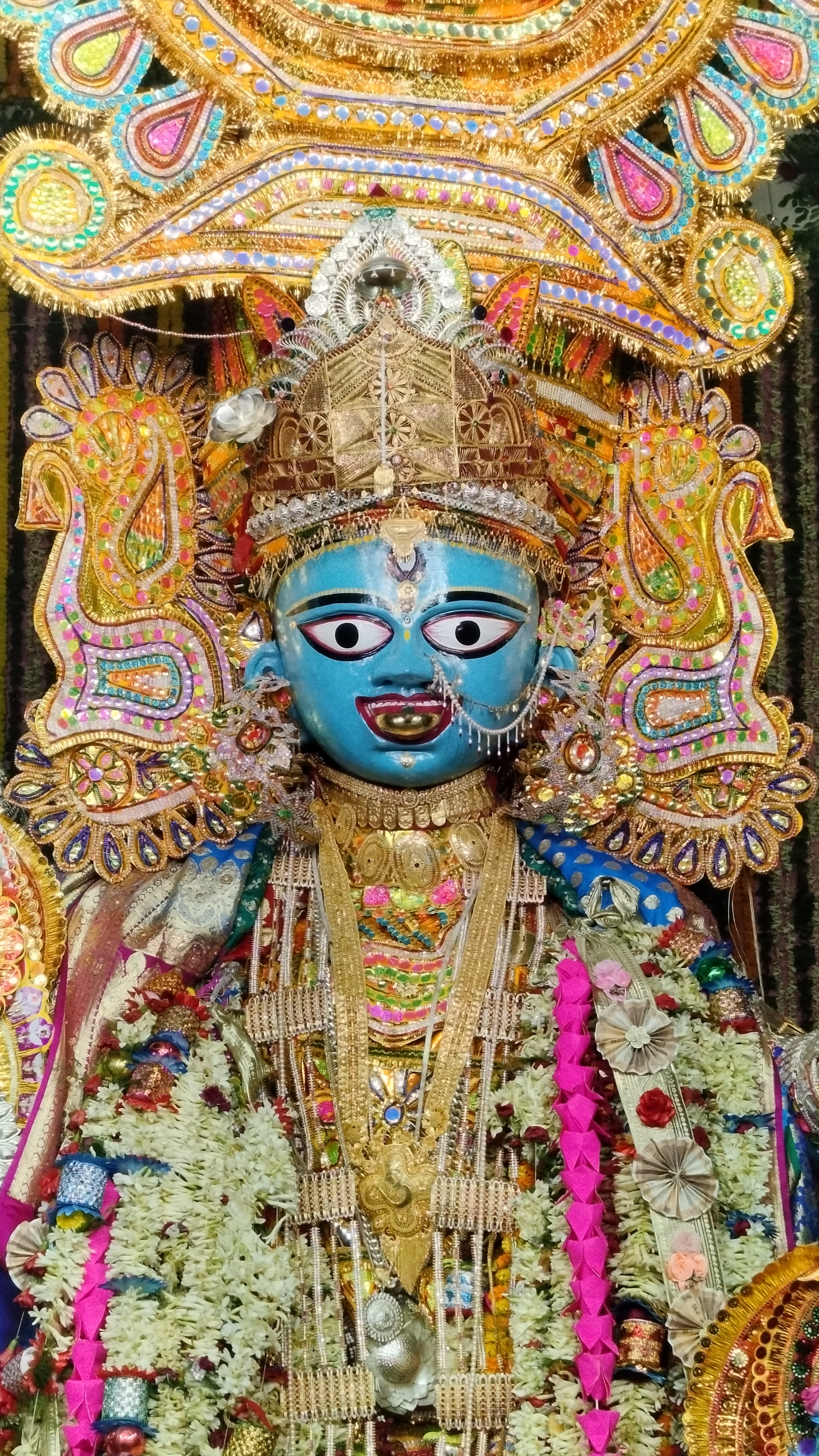
Close up of Boro Maa's face.

A famous temple in Antpur is that of Radhagovindjiu with exquisite terracotta carvings. It is here that Swami Vivekananda took monastic vows in 1886. This 100-foot-high temple was constructed by Krishna Ram Mitra, the Diwan of Bardhaman Raj in 1786 (1708 Shakabda). Its Chandi Mandap and Dol Mancha have beautifully crafted wood carvings and terracotta.

== Geography ==
Cities and towns in Chanditala I, Chanditala II and Jangipara CD Blocks in Srirampore subdivision in Hooghly district
M: municipal city/ town, CT: census town, R: rural/ urban centre,
Owing to space constraints in the small map, the actual locations in a larger map may vary slightly

=== Location ===
Antpur is located at 22.7834°N 88.0436°E

Villages in Antpur panchayat are as follows: Atpur, Rajhati, Bilara, Lohagachhi, Ranibazar, Anarbati, Arabindapur, Tarajol, Raipur, Bamnagar, Tara, Palgachha, Kumarbazar, Ichhabati, Gopalpur and Mirpur.

=== Urbanisation ===
Srirampore subdivision is the most urbanized of the subdivisions in Hooghly district. 73.13% of the population in the subdivision is urban and 26.88% is rural. The subdivision has 6 municipalities and 34 census towns. The municipalities are: Uttarpara Kotrung Municipality, Konnagar Municipality, Serampore Municipality, Baidyabati Municipality, Rishra Municipality and Dankuni Municipality. Amongst the CD Blocks in the subdivision, Uttarapara Serampore (census towns shown in a separate map) had 76% urban population, Chanditala I 42%, Chanditala II 69% and Jangipara 7% (census towns shown in the map above). All places marked in the map are linked in the larger full screen map.

== Demographics ==
As per 2011 Census of India, Antpur had a total population of 2,623 of which 1,363 (52%) were males and 1,260 (48%) were females. Population below 6 years was 211. The total number of literates in Atpur was 1,957 (81.14% of the population over 6 years).

Antpur had a population of 2,548 out of which 944 belonged to scheduled castes and 17 belonged to scheduled tribes.

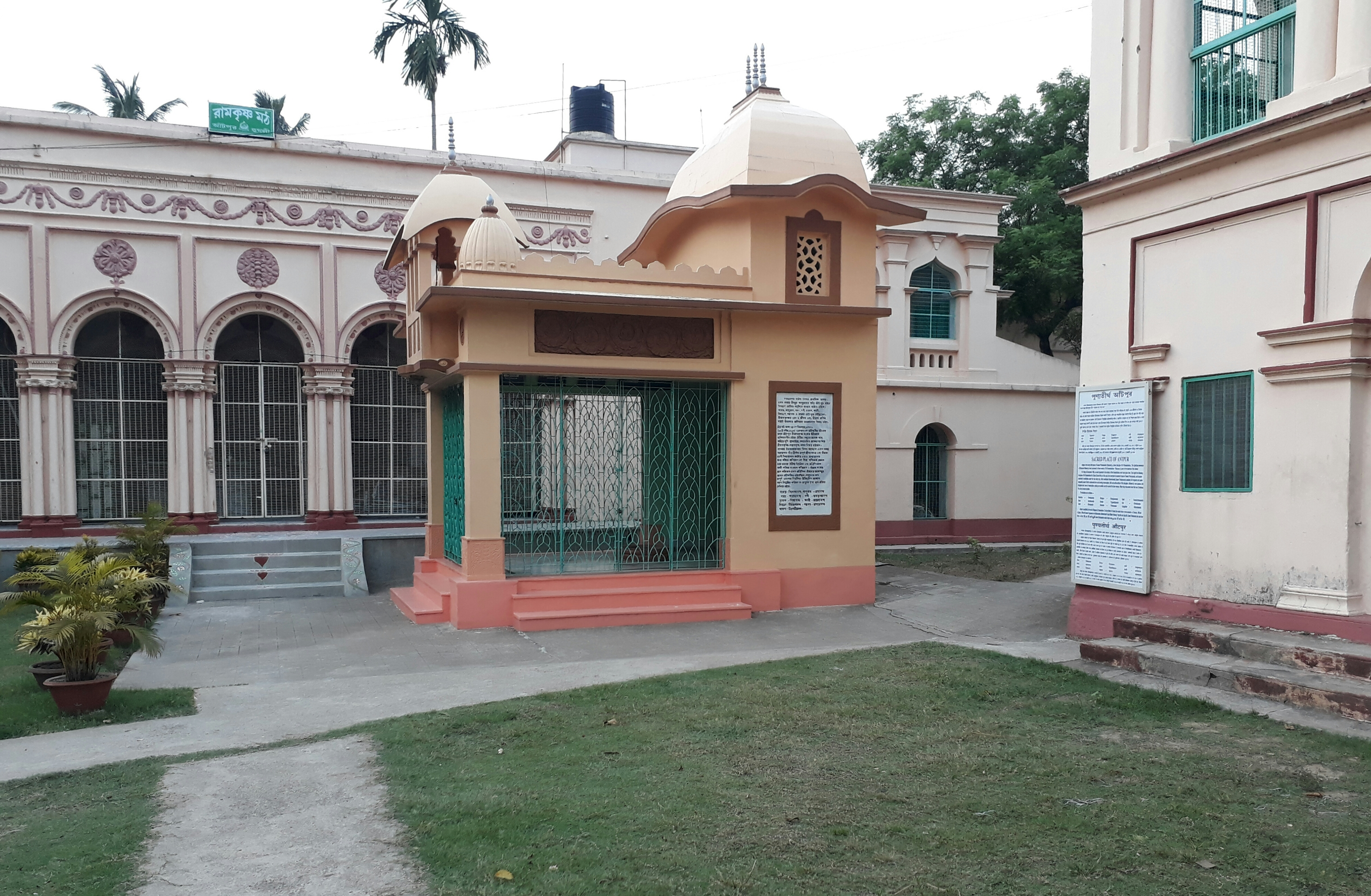
The holy place where Vivekananda other disciples took their vow of 'sannyasa', Antpur, Hooghly

== Economy ==
The Boro Maa Kali Puja which is celebrated every year a day before Kali Puja, on Bhoot Chaturdashi, brings lakhs of devotees all around Bengal. This significantly boosts Antpur's economy.

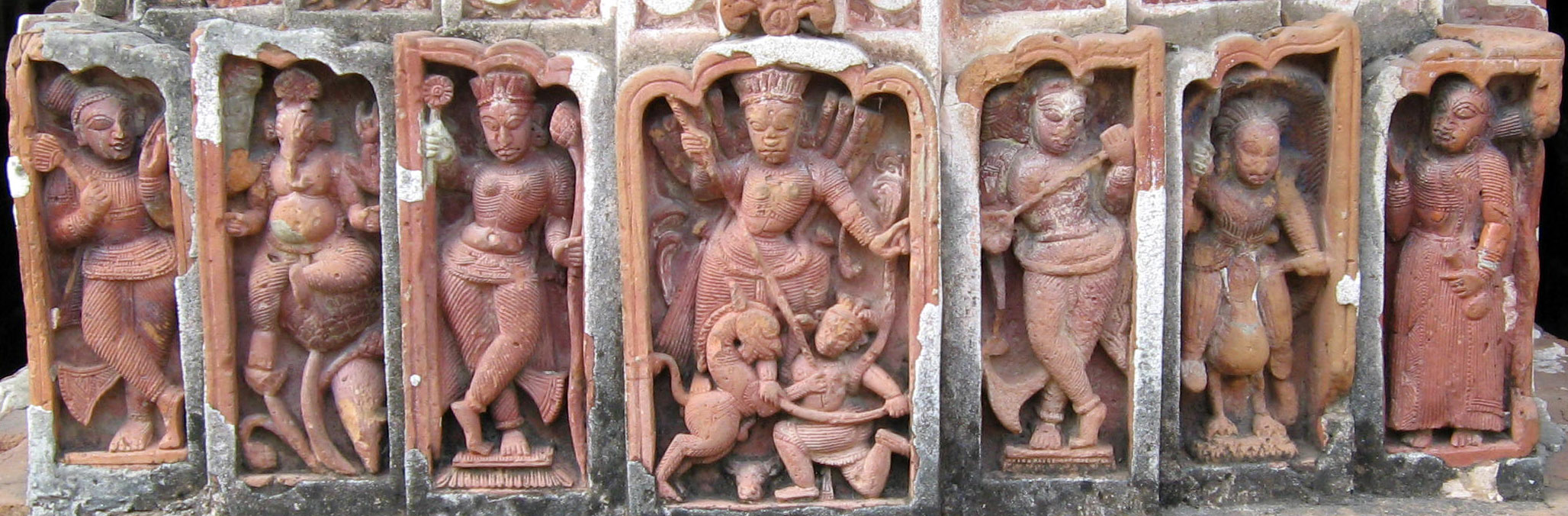
Antpur Radhagovindjiu Temple Terracotta details

Antpur's rural economy has developed due to the presence of the famous temples listed above. A constant stream of middle-class Hindu devotees visits Antpur. The villagers are accustomed to vehicular traffic and other exposure to the lifestyles of well-off Indians and foreigners.

Rajbalhat, 20 minutes by bus from Antpur, is famous for the Rajballabhi Temple and handloom saris.

== Transport ==
Now, one has to go to Antpur by road either directly from Kolkata or from Tarakeswar or Haripal. From Kolkata via Ahilyabai Holkar Road (State Highway 15) to Gajar More Bus Stop, then from Gajar More left turn, towards Antpur approx 6 km Or From Howrah Station, Tarakeswar/ Arambagh/ Goghat local, to Haripal railway station, from there Buses (9 and 10 - Haripal Station to Udaynarayanpur, 9A - Haripal Station to Bargachia and few Shuttle Buses) are available to Antpur. Earlier Antpur was a station on the Howrah-Amta-Sehakhala-Champadanga narrow-gauge route of the Martin's Light Railways, a private rail service established in 1892. The rail company was shut down in 1971 and the tourist flow to the village declined gradually after that.

== Education ==
Antpur High School is a coeducational higher secondary school. It has arrangements for teaching Bengali, English, Sanskrit, history, geography, philosophy, political science, economics, eco-geography, accountancy, business economics & mathematics, mathematics, physics, chemistry and bio science.
