= List of Hindu temples in West Bengal =

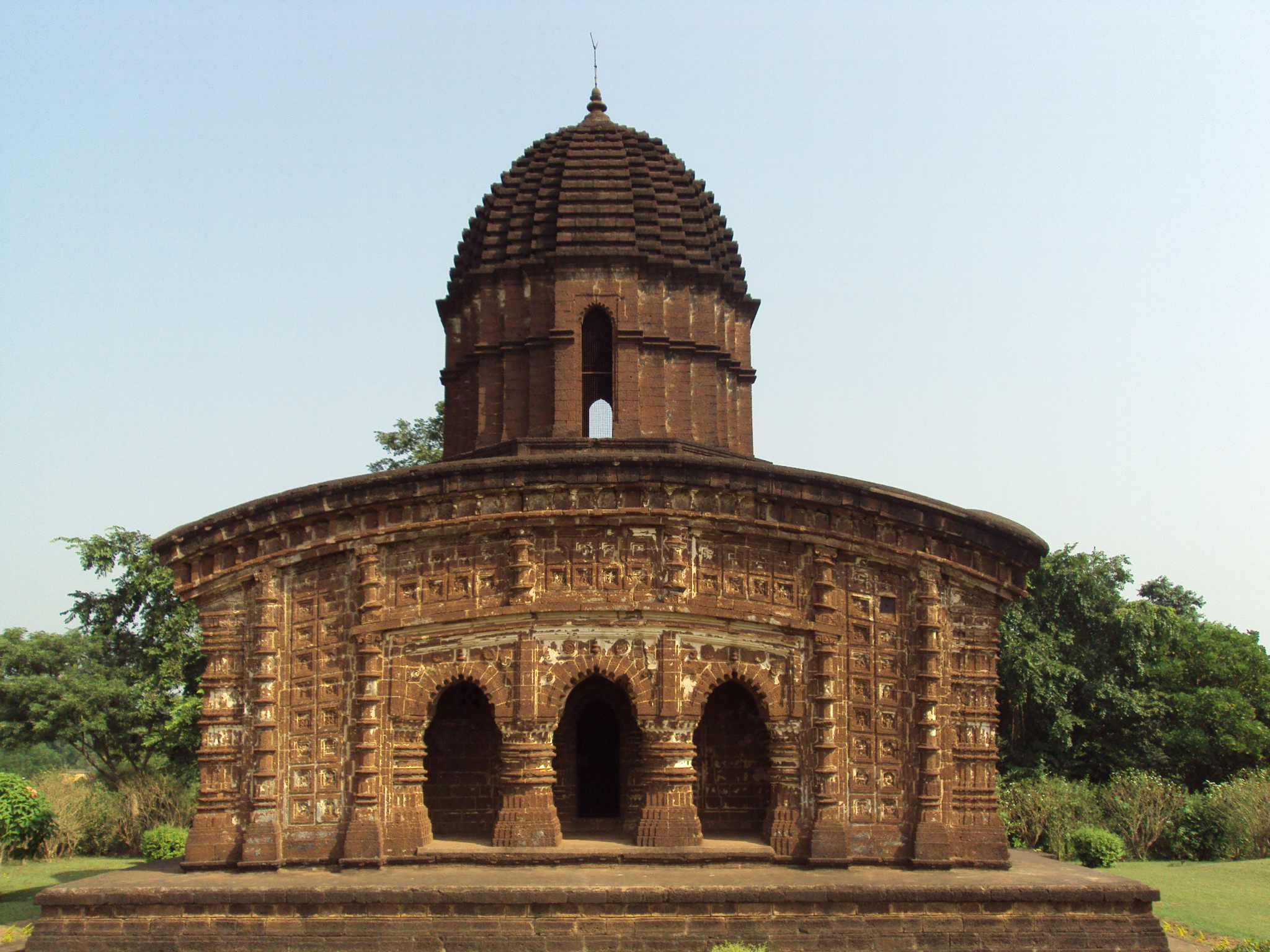
Bishnupur – Nandalal-Temple (17. Jh.) with tower (ratna) on the Cella (garbhagriha) and three shared portals on all four sides; the outside walls are covered with figurative and ornamental Terracotta relief panels decorated. The corners of the slightly curved roof slopes down.

Hindu temples in West Bengal or Bengal Temples are a special form of the Hindu temple in India. They are mostly from the 17th to the 19th century and are mainly located in the present-day Indian state of West Bengal. A few – but often ruined-buildings are also on the territory of today's Bangladesh. The major Hindu temples of West Bengal are Madan Mohan Temple, Jalpesh Temple, Tarapith Temple, Kiriteswari Temple, Bishnupur Terracotta temples, Mayapur Chandrodaya Mandir, Naba Kailash Mandir, Thakurbari Matua Dham, Tarakeshwar Temple, Hangseshwari Temple, Bargabhima Temple, Belur Math, Kalighat Temple and Dakshineswar Kali Temple.

== Materials ==
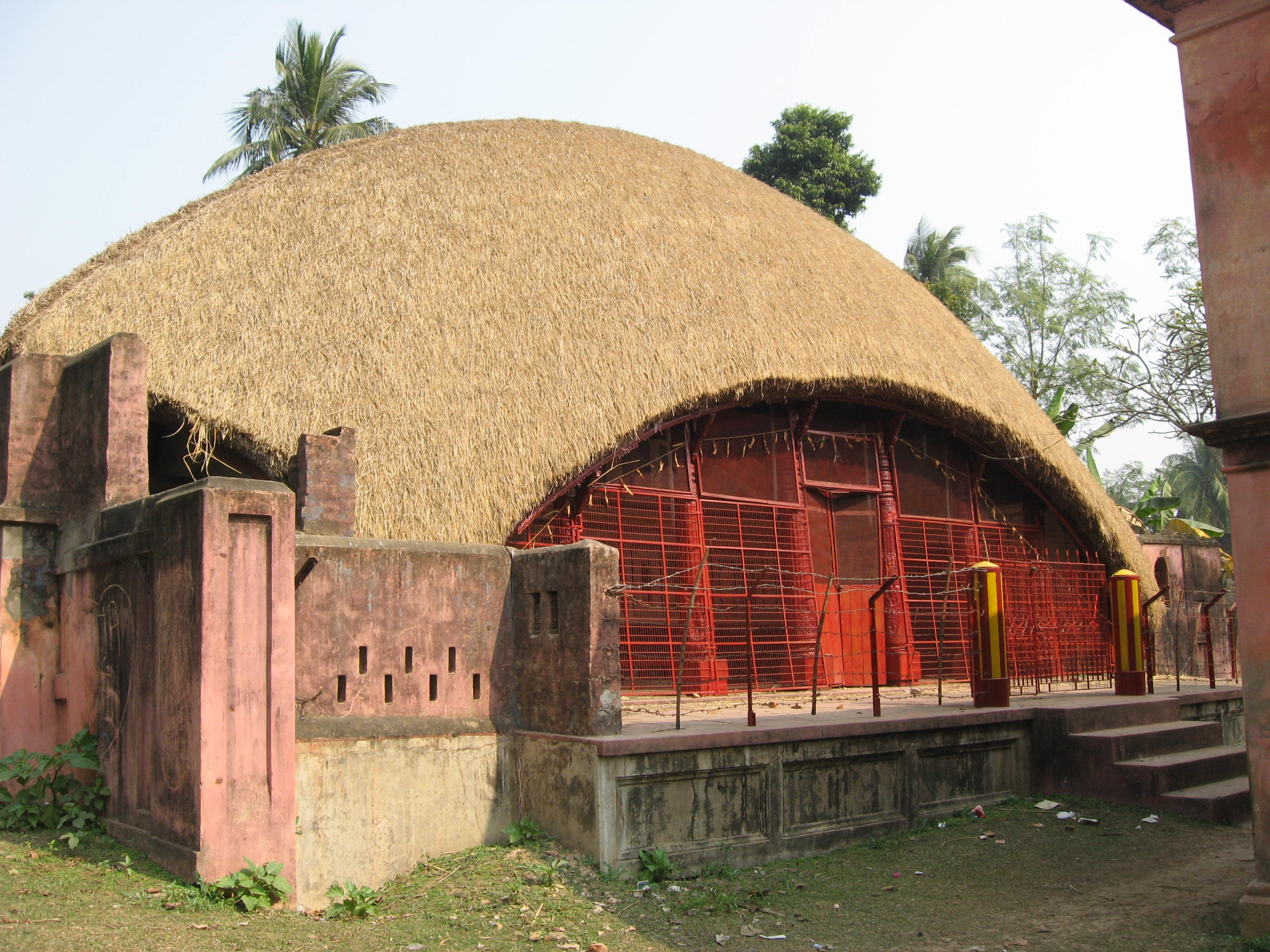
Antpur-rural temple (mandir) with thatched roof

Bengal is in large Parts of the fertile alluvial plain of the Ganges/Hooghly and Brahmaputra, as well as a number of tributaries, the largest of which is Meghna. Natural stone deposits are almost unknown, and so the residential houses in the countryside until well into the 20th century were. Century almost exclusively – sometimes mud-plastered Branches, or (more rarely) from air-dried clay bricks and the roofs were made of straw or reeds.

At an early age, Bengal also understood the burning of clay, so that the temple buildings of the 5th/6th century (or the hard-to-date Deul temples) were built of bricks. At the temples of the 17th to 19th century, figurative and decorative terracotta relief plates were regularly applied. Most of the city houses were built in this period also from bricks and then plastered.

== Consecration ==
Although early Buddhist and Jainist traces are also found in Bengal, most temples are dedicated to Hindu deities Shiva, Vishnu and Kali, or their locally and regionally revered aspects, which is why many temples have different names. God Krishna and his beloved Radha also enjoy Bengal wide popularity.

== History ==
The oldest known temple of Bengal, belonging to the group of the so-called Gupta temples, is the brick temple (mandir) of Balgram (Dinajpur district, Bangladesh), which can be attributed to the Vaishnava sect-but only remains of ruins are preserved. At the same time, the two – also largely destroyed – temples of Mahasthan Gokul (District of Bogra, Bangladesh), which are most likely to be attributed to Buddhism due to the remains of found figures. Both temples have a square floor plan with an equally square Cella (garbhagriha), which was enclosed by a prostrate dormant and formerly covered handling (pradakshinapatha). Perhaps from the 9th to the 11th century, but perhaps only much later, several temple buildings were built in the south of West Bengal.After the arrival of Islam in northern India, which regarded Hinduism as 'pagan' and 'idolatrous,' many older temples were destroyed and hardly any new buildings were built. In the early 17th century, however, the attitude of the Mogul ruler Jahangir (reg. 1605-1627), as well as political and military weaknesses of the Mughal Empire and the great distance to the courts of Lahore, Agra or Aurangabad exploitative – reinforced with the construction of temples, which represent within the Hindu temple, a completely unique architectural type. Here, the temples in Bishnupur, the ancient capital of the Malla dynasty, as well as the temple districts of Antpur and Kalna, are to be mentioned in the forefront, but also the temple complex of Puthia, Bangladesh, deserve special mention.

== Architecture ==
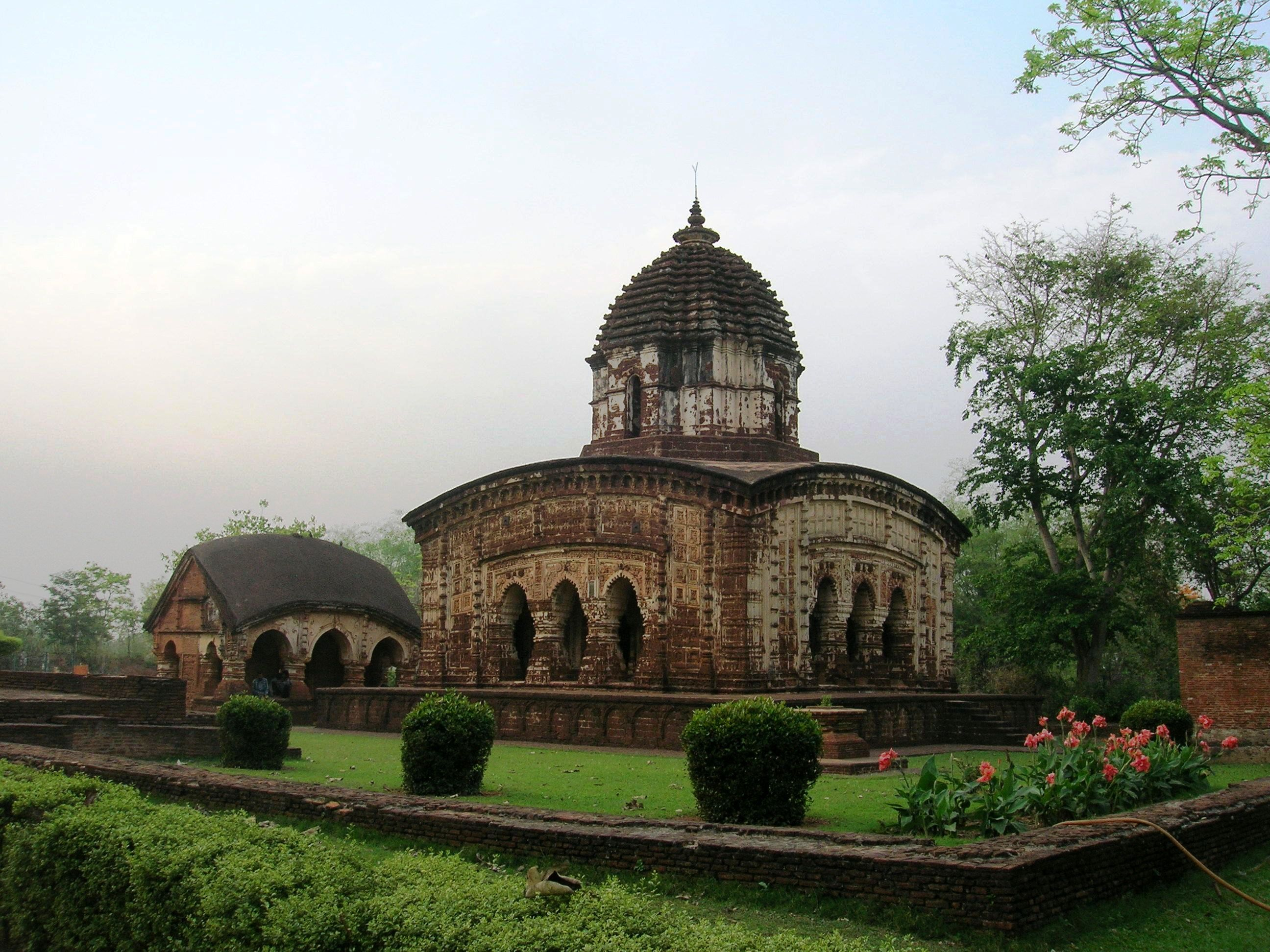
Bishnupur – Radhamadhab-Temple (1739)

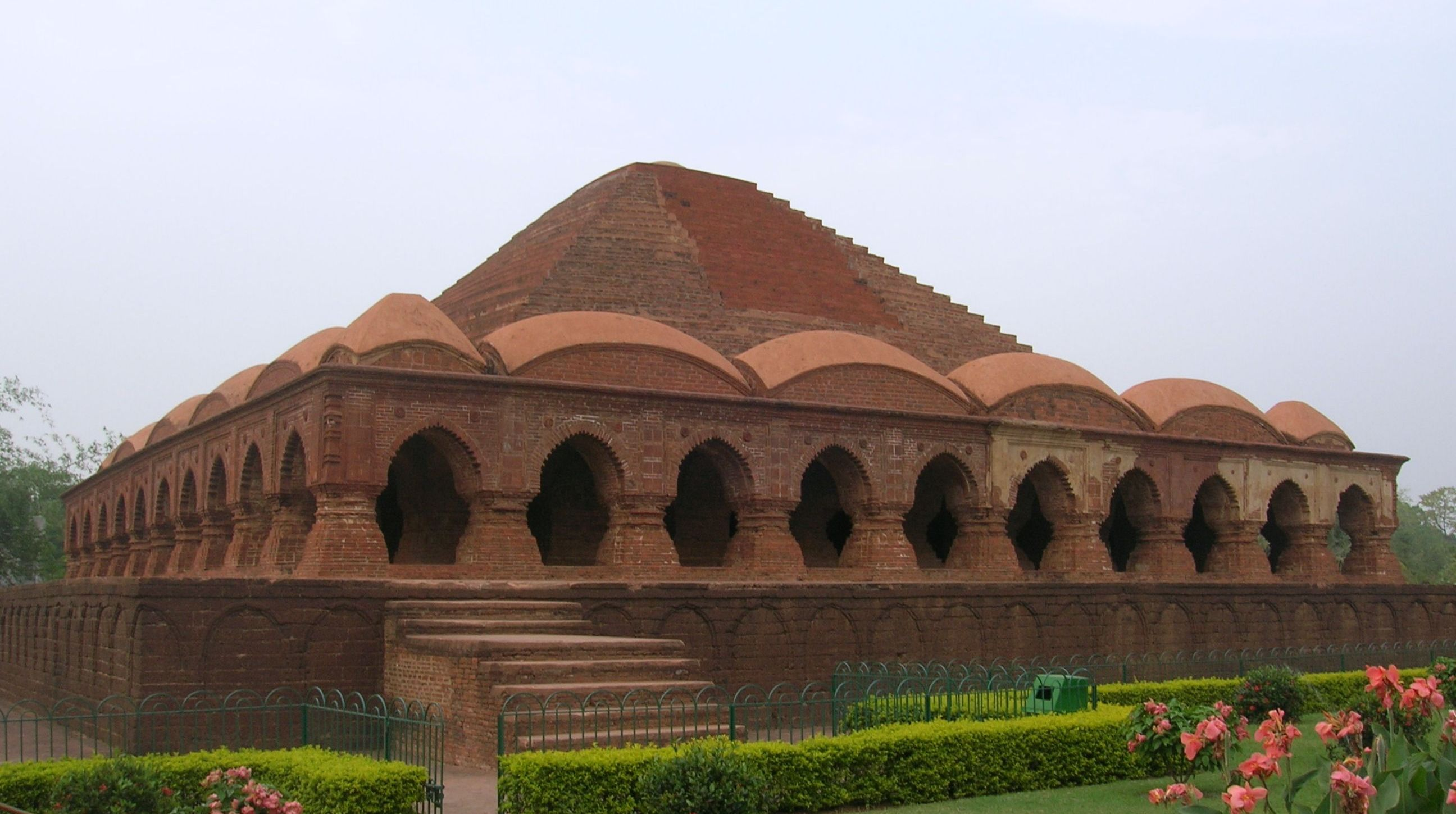
Bishnupur – Rasmancha-Temple (1600)

Early temples of the 16th century have rarely been preserved; they consisted only of a Cella (garbhagriha) with a square layout (see Puthia Temple Complex).

Characteristic features of the later temples of Bengal type are the maintenance of the square floor plan-but now with a stronger internal and external structure-and the arched vaulted roofs with their hanging corners (Bengal roofs). All the temples now stand on two to almost five-Meter high platforms (jagatis), which derive the rainwater from the structure and raise it at the same time real as symbolically over other buildings. Behind the four (mostly three – way) portals, which are based on a triumphal arch scheme, is the also square Cella (garbhagriha), which is surrounded by a completely integrated into the temple building (pradakshinapatha). The roof is usually elevated by one (Ek-ratna) or five (pancharatna) usually round Tambour-like towers, which differ in their shape significantly from the tower-like structures (shikharas) of North Indian temples of Nagara style. From 17. to 19. In the 19th century, nine-to thirteen-Tower Temple buildings were built, but also a few with flat roofs.

In contrast, the towerless Rasmancha temple in Bishnupur, which was built around 1600, offers a very unusual architecture: the massive square structure, which occupies about four times the base of a normal Bengal temple, is overestimated by a pyramid-like structure. On the other hand, the roof of the exterior, which is open on each side by ten arcades, consists of a number of smaller, stacked roofs of the Bengal type.

Bengal temples are also characterised by the complete absence of mandapas, jalis or balconies; jewelry such as amalakas and kalashas are also rare. There are also Toranas (Toranas), which, however, have the appearance of smaller buildings.

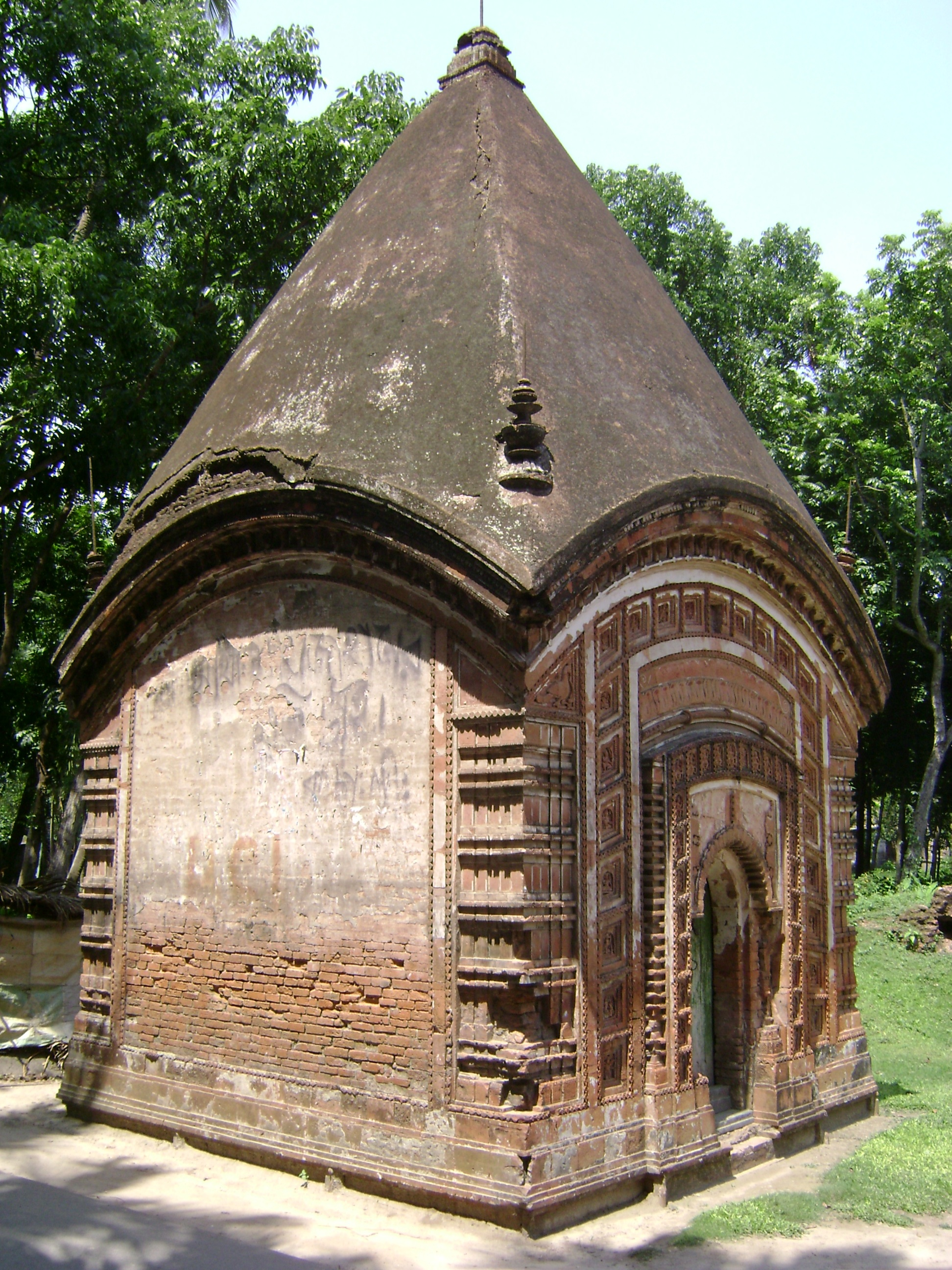
Puthia (Bangladesh) – Jagannatha-Temple
(16. Jh.)

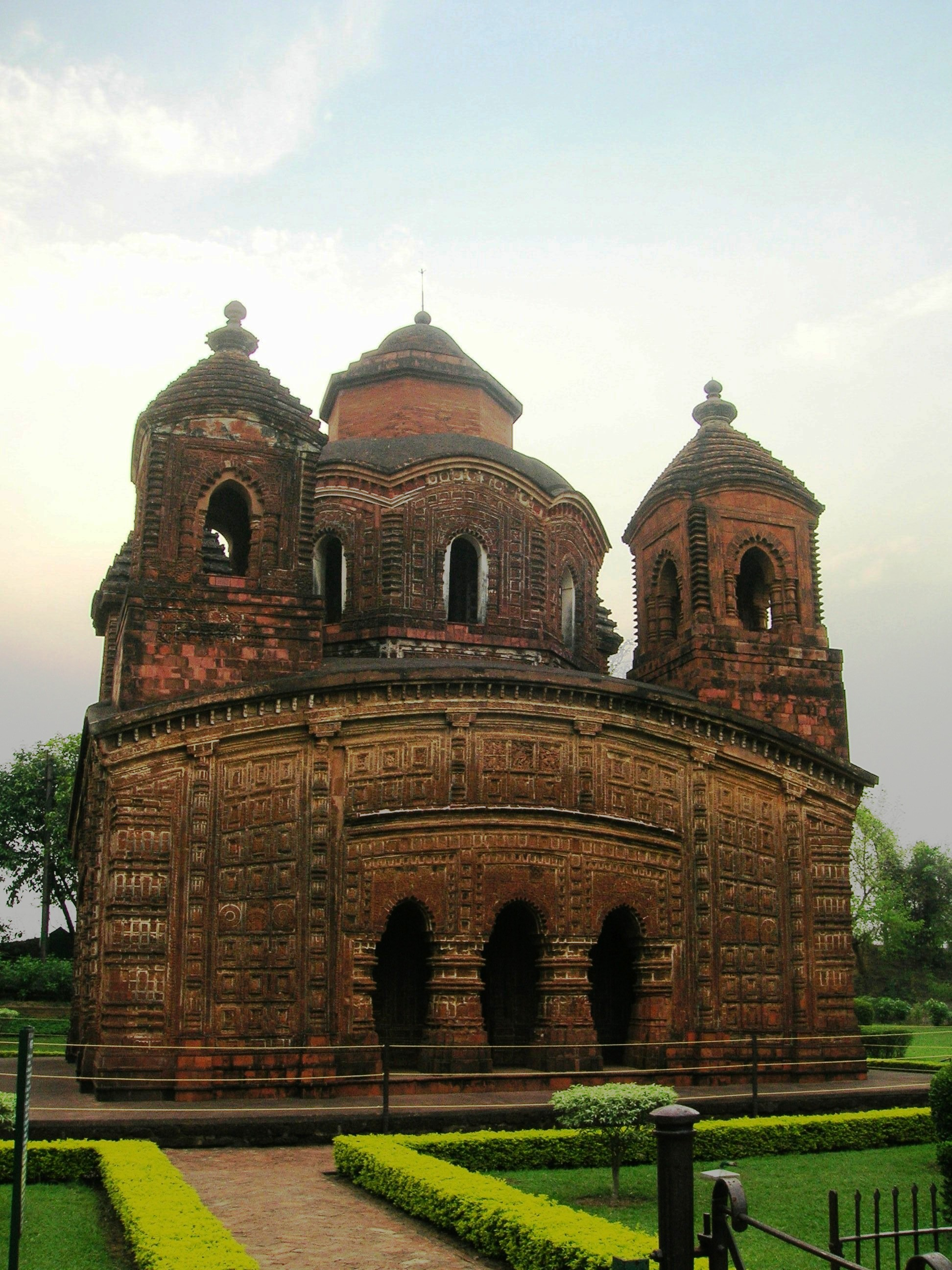
Bishnupur – Shyam Ray-Temple (1643)

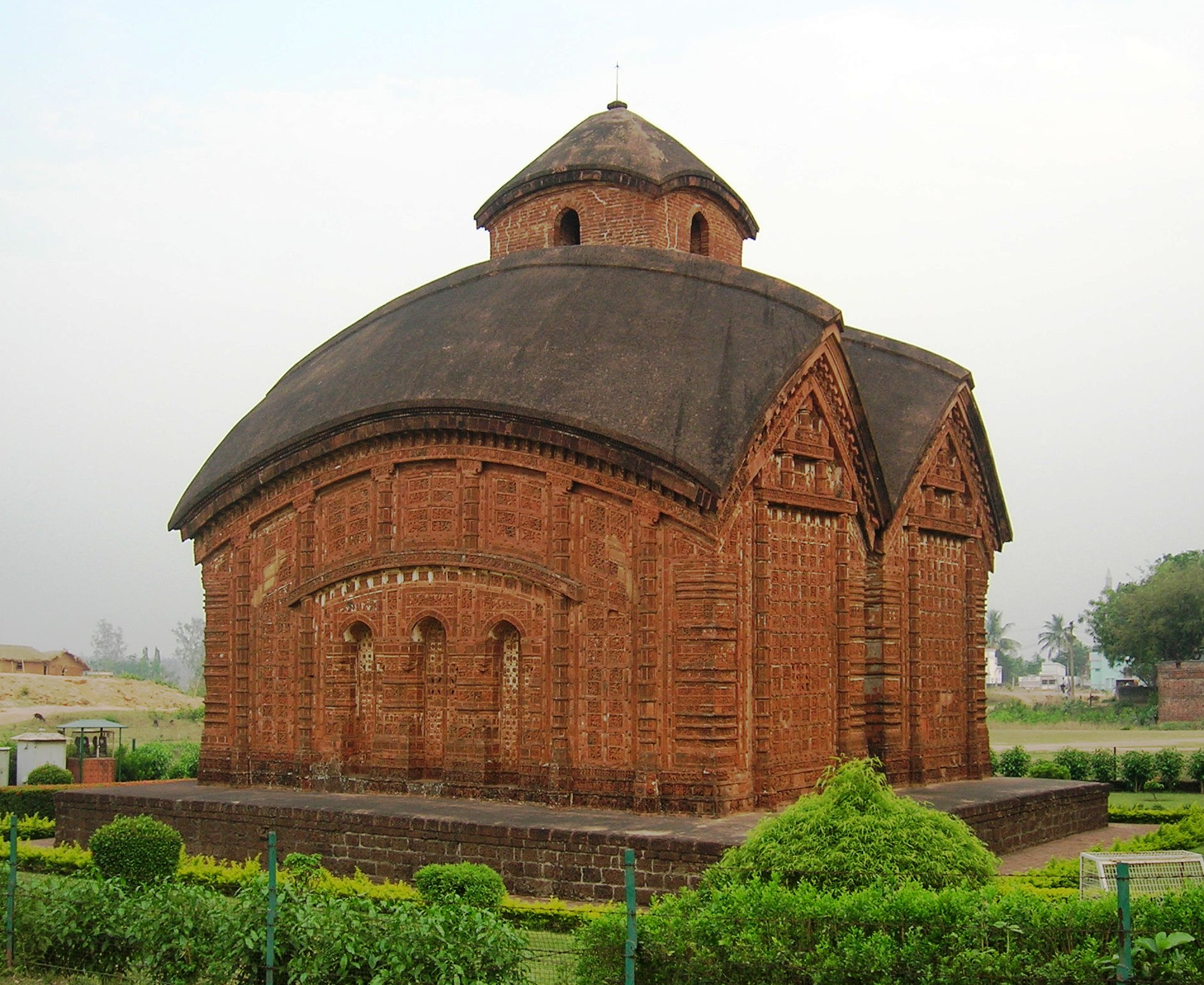
Bishnupur – Jor-Bangla-Temple (1655)

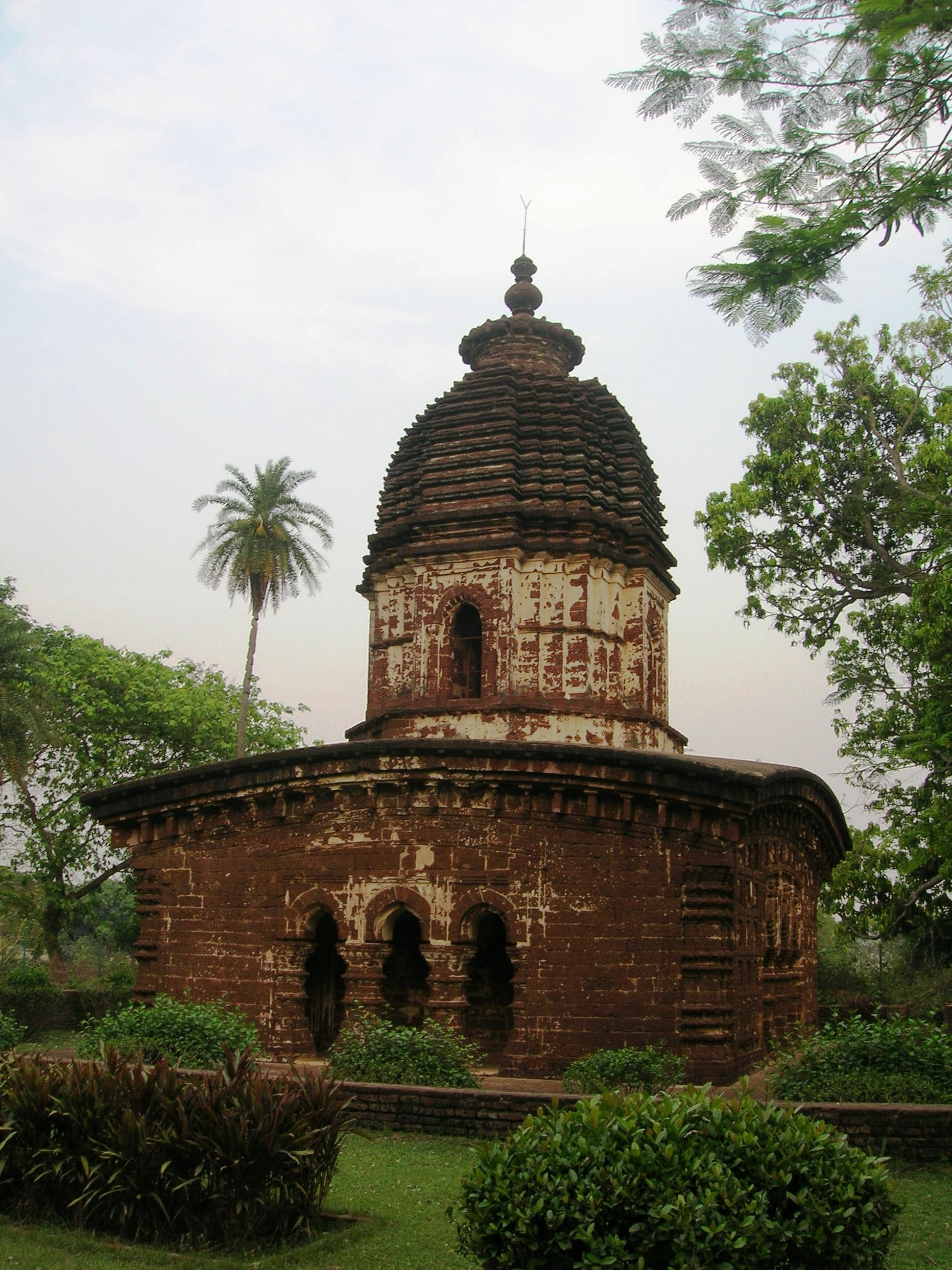
Bishnupur – Kalachand-Temple (1656)

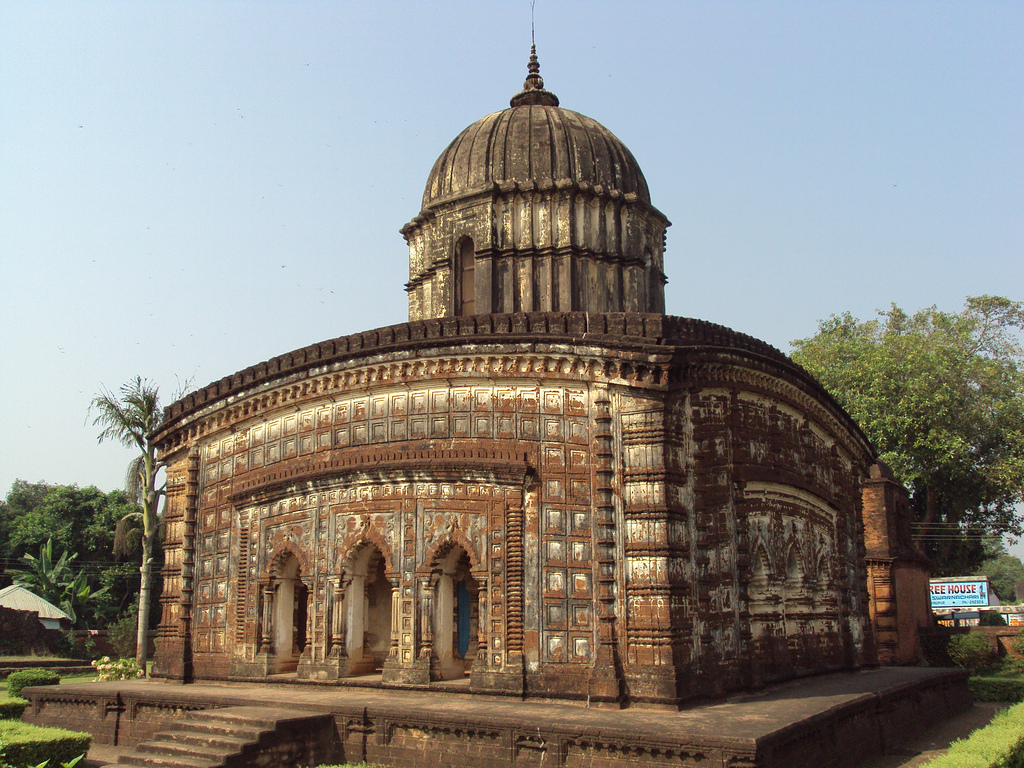
Bishnupur – Lalji-Temple (1658)

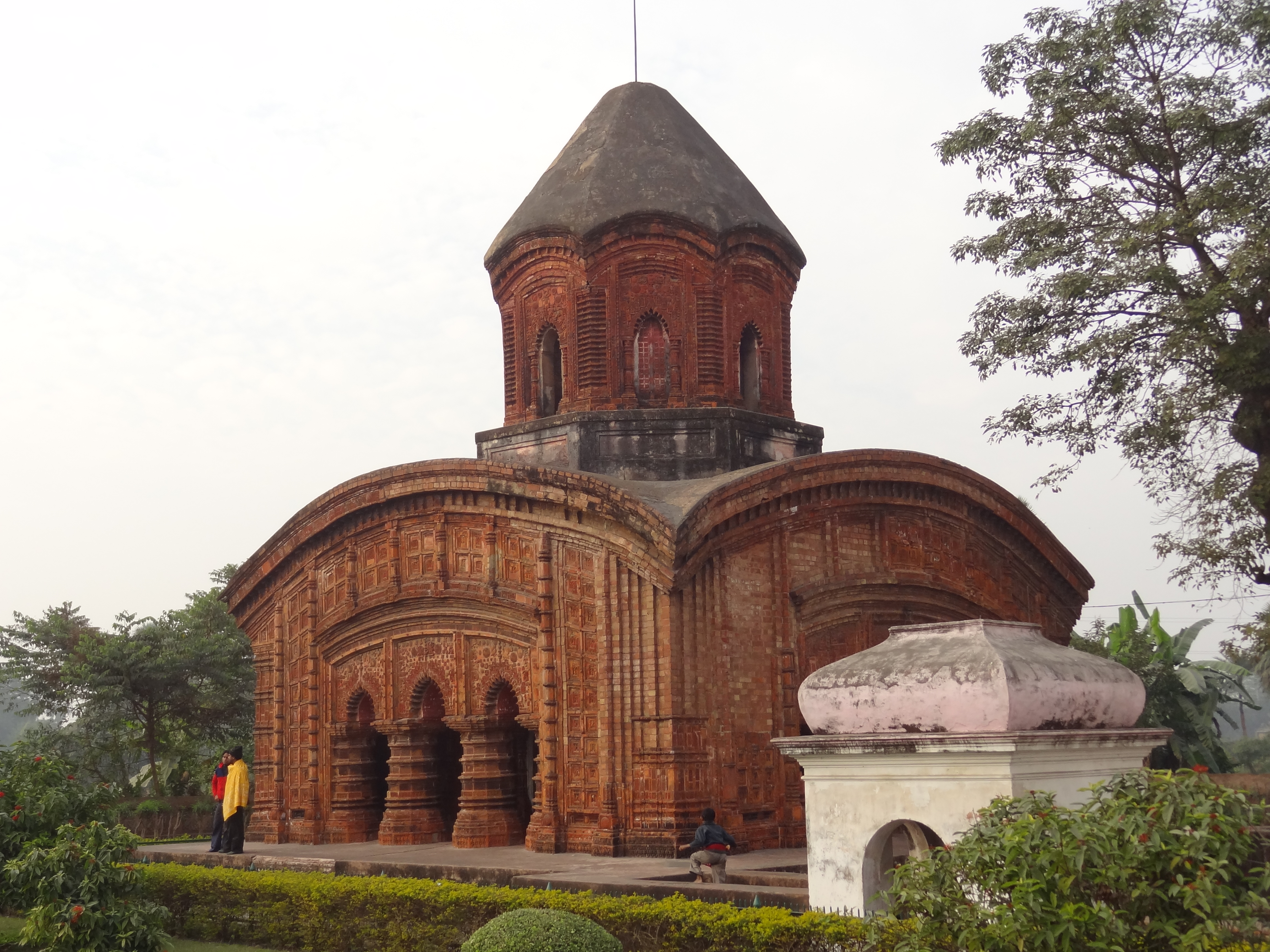
Bansberia – Ananta Basudeba-Temple (1679)

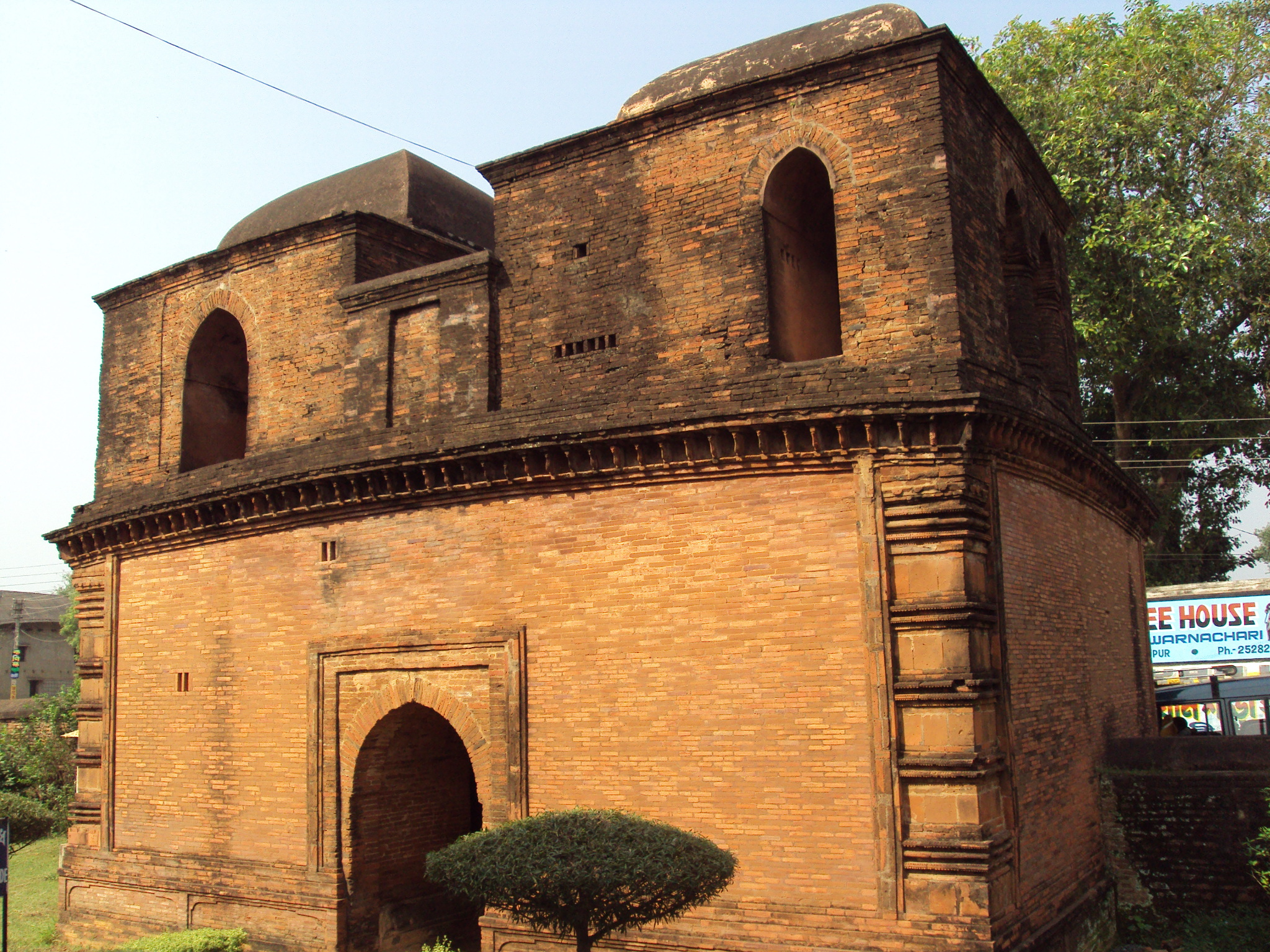
Bishnupur – Radhyashyam-Temple (um 1758)

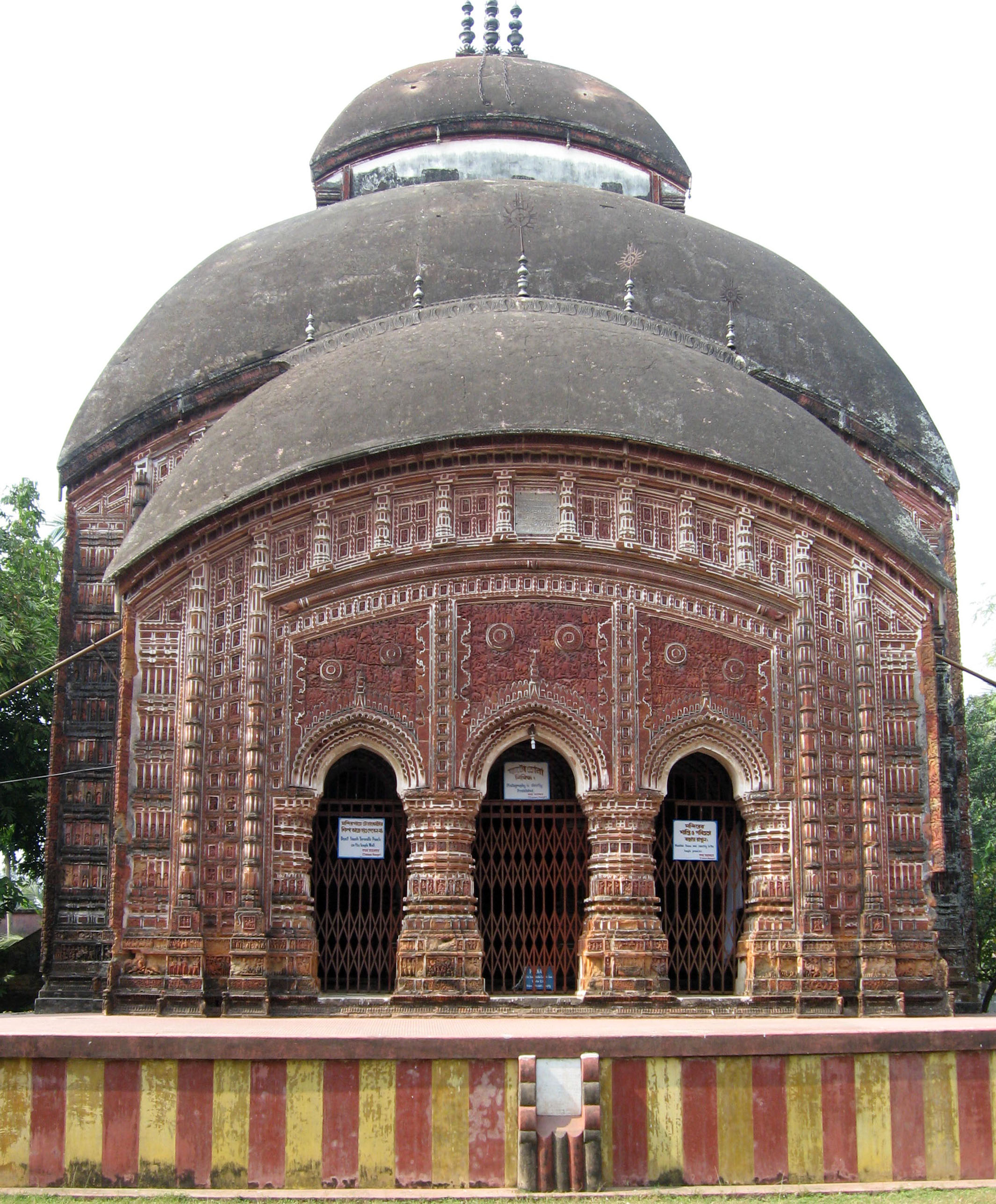
Antpur – Radhagovindjiu-Temple (1786)

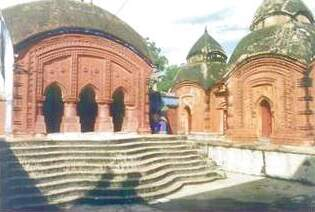
Kalna – Siddheswari Kali Temple (18. Jh.)

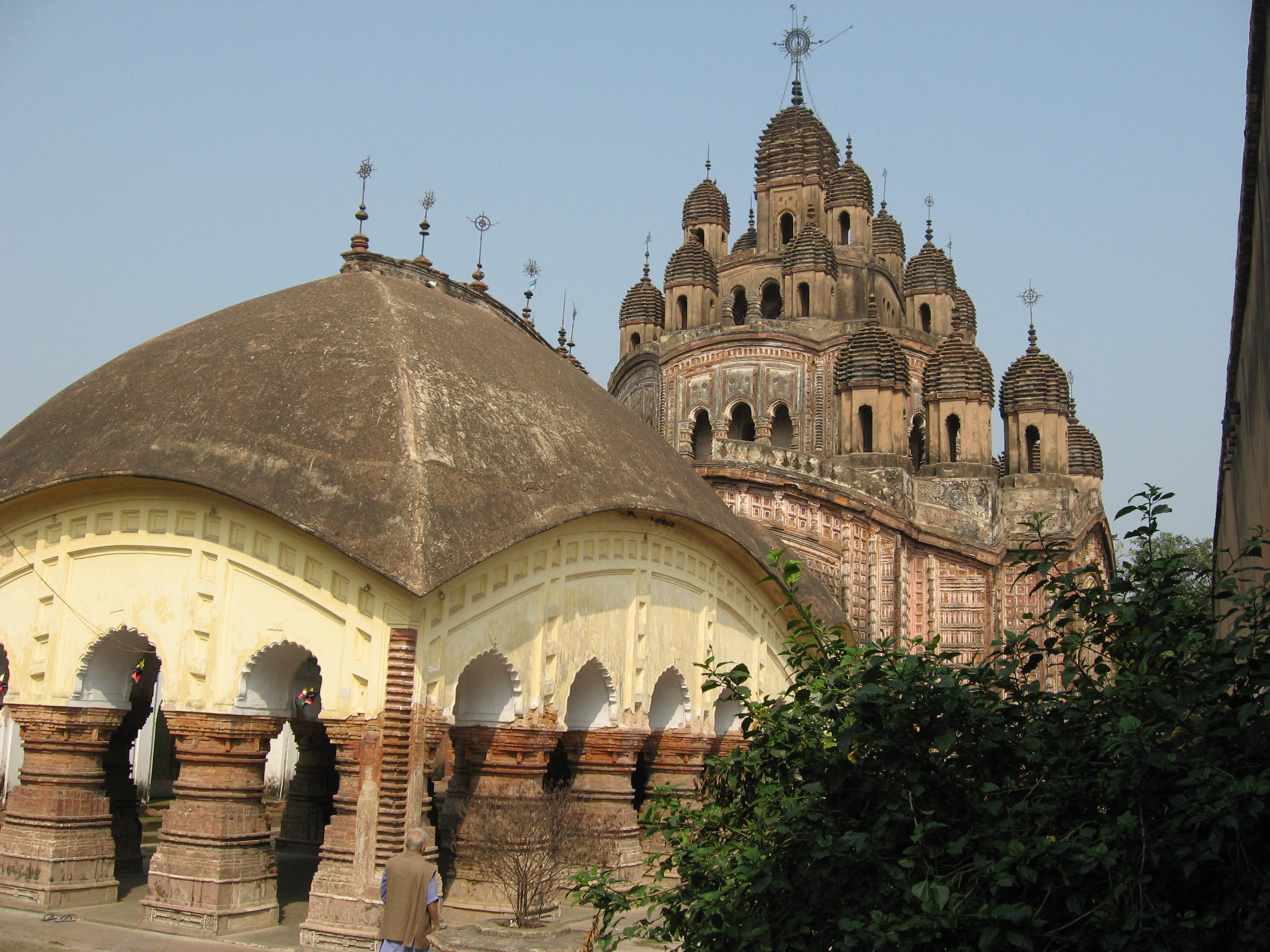
Kalna – Lalji-Temple (1739)

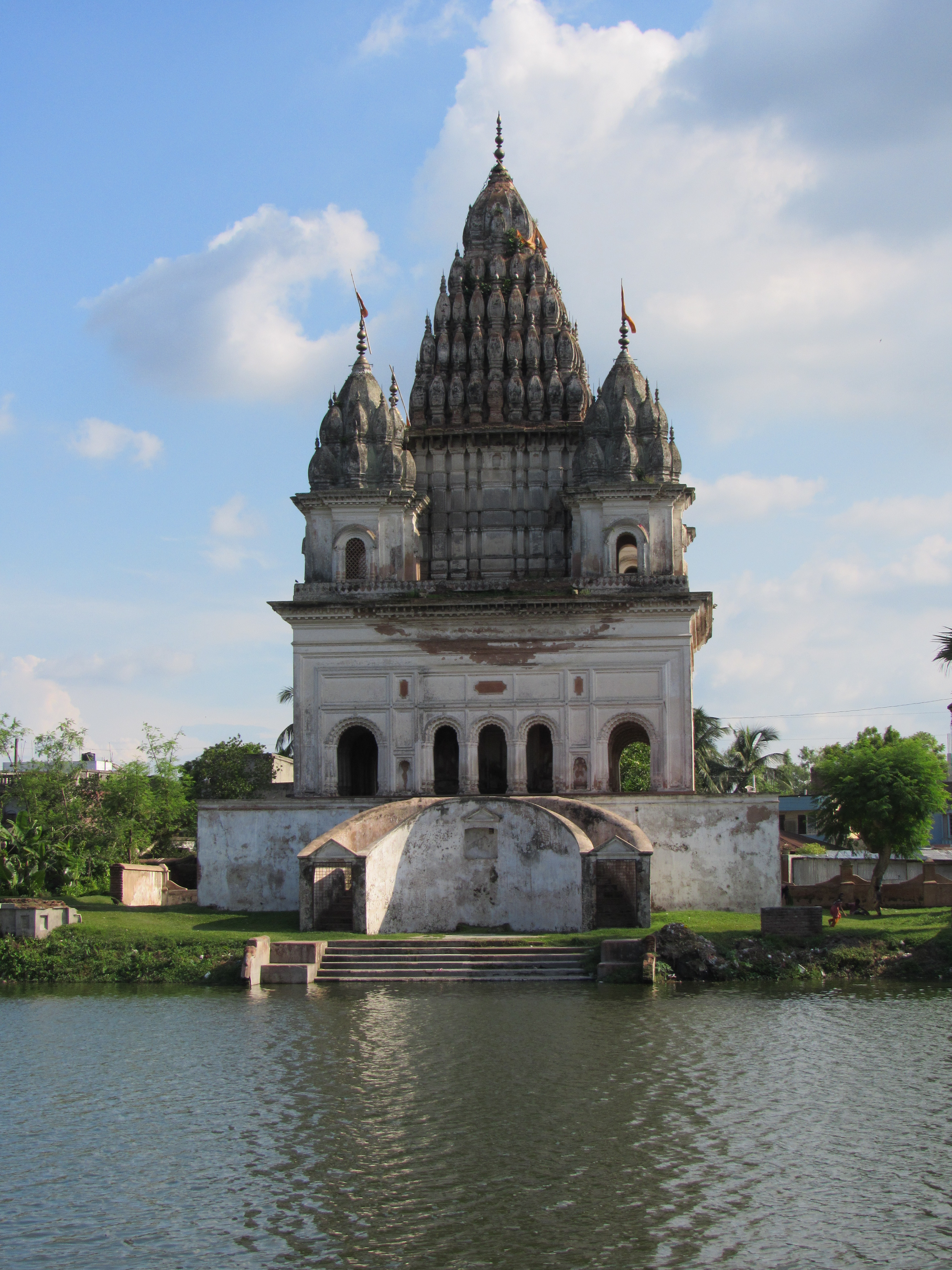
Puthia – Shiva-Temple (19. Jh.)

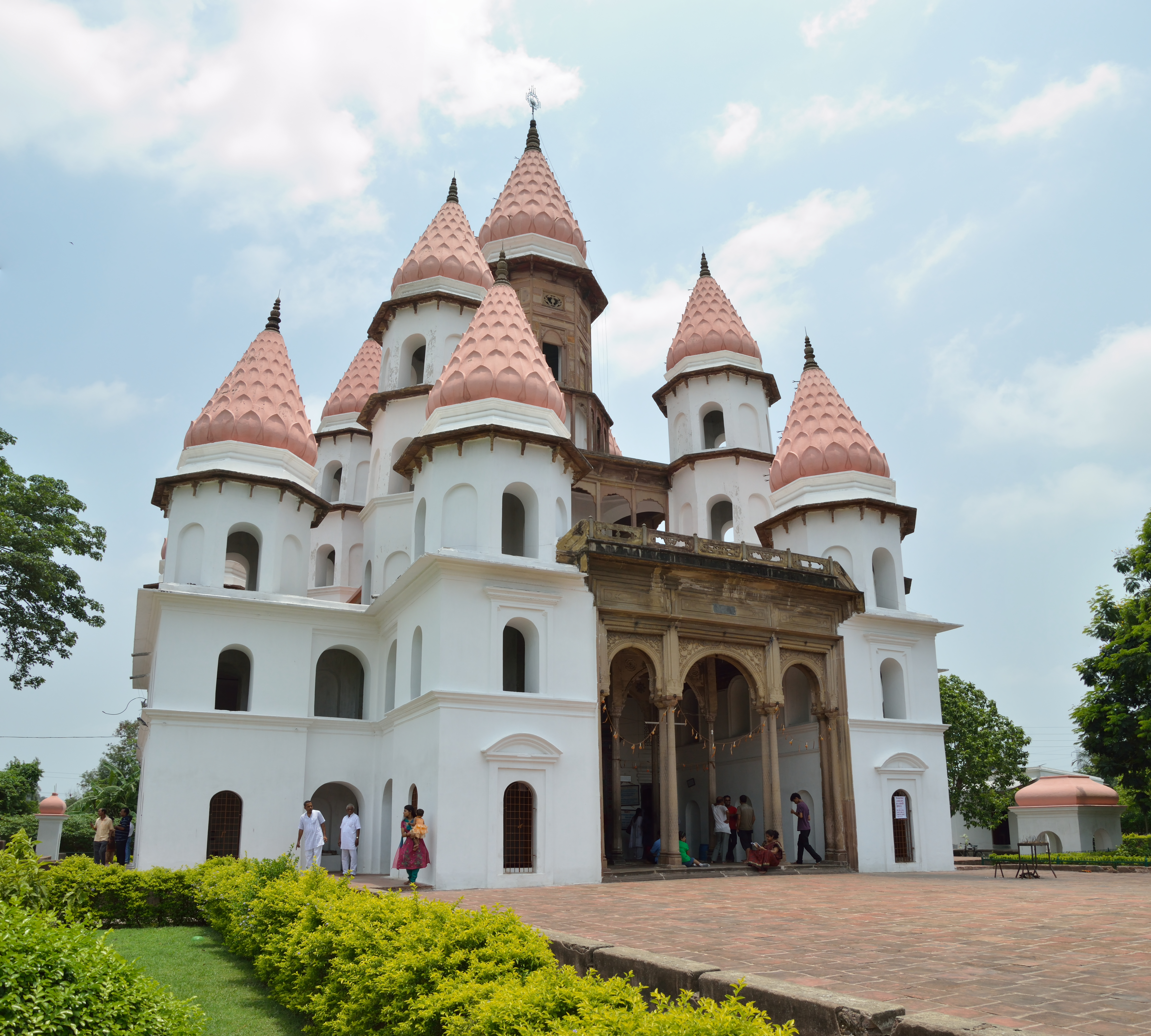
Bansberia – Hansheshwari-Temple (19. Jh.)

== Construction jewellery ==
The outer skin of most temples is subdivided into fields. These are either dekorlos or included, in individual cases, terracotta Reliefs, in which gods and demons, but also geometrical and vegetable decorative motifs or scenes of courtly life, but also of the rural and peasant life to see. The depictions of the flute playing and surrounded by dancers god Krishna at the Shyamrai temple or one (reeds-?) Boats with seated rowing boats and standing musicians (vina players) at the Jor Bangla temple in Bishnupur are particularly noteworthy; it is worth noting that the far-flung Dragon mouth on the bow of the ship.

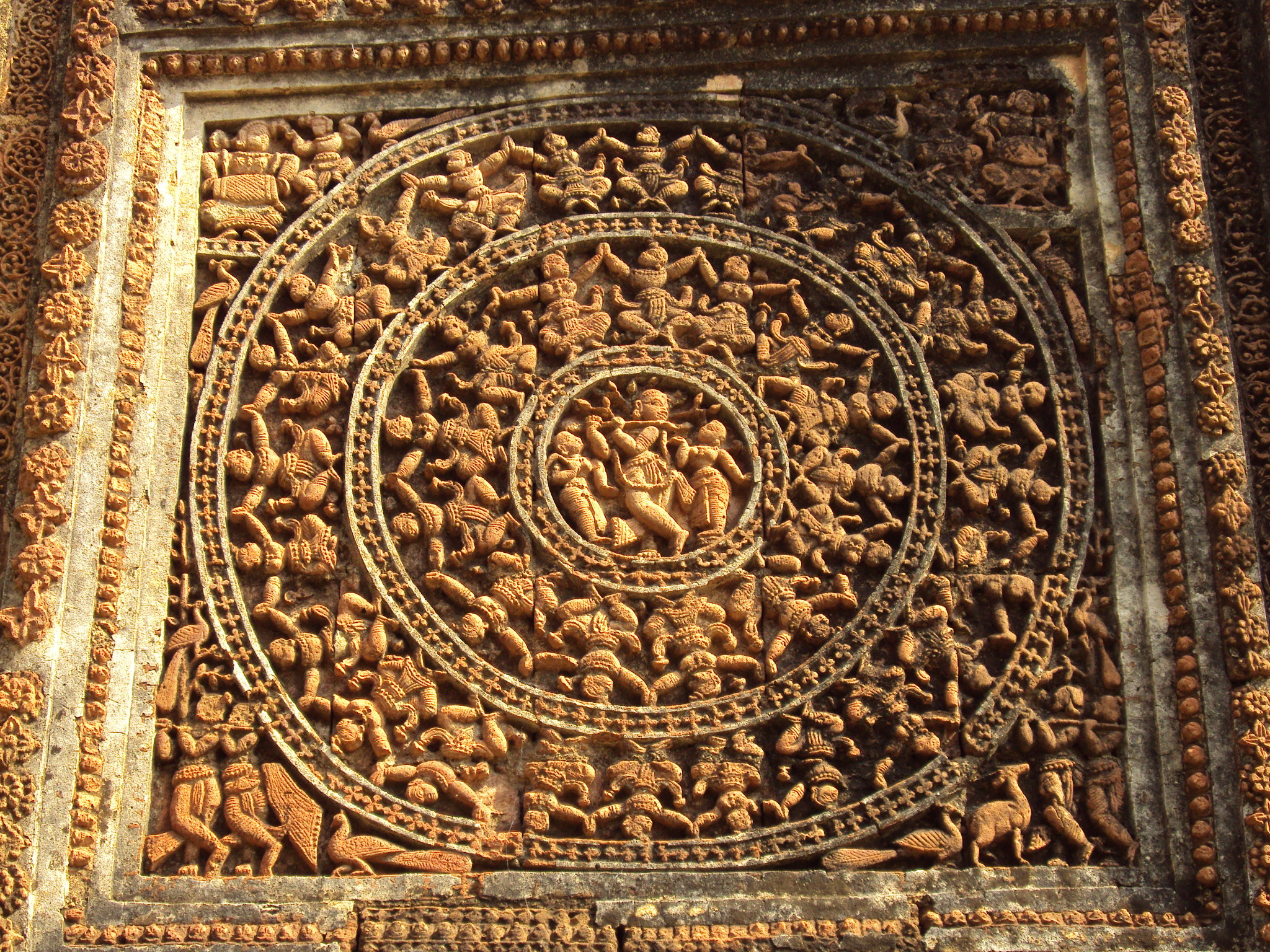
Bishnupur – Terracotta-Relief in Shyamrai-Temple (Krishna and Radha)

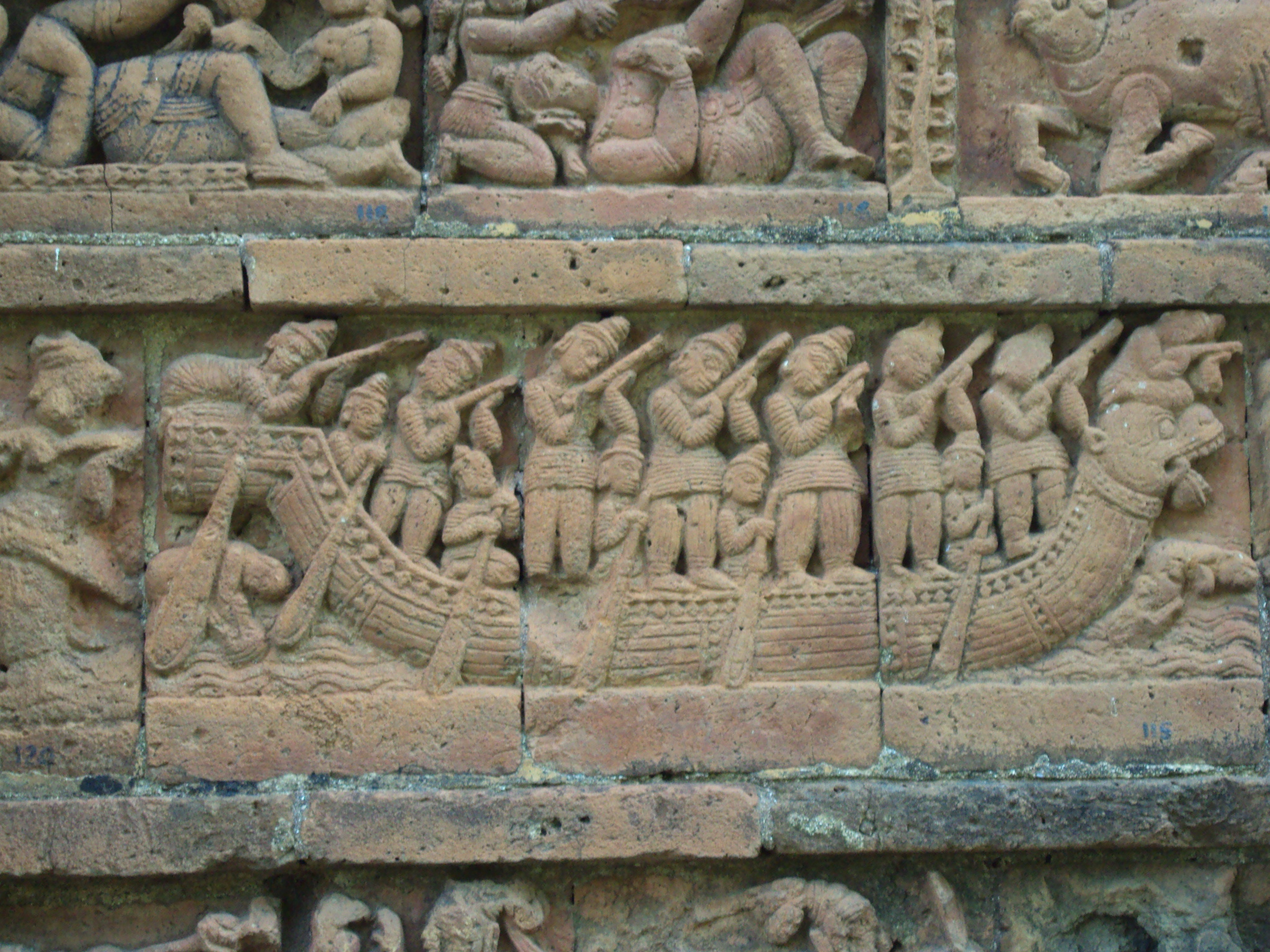
Bishnupur – Terracotta-Reliefs in Jor-Bangla-Temple

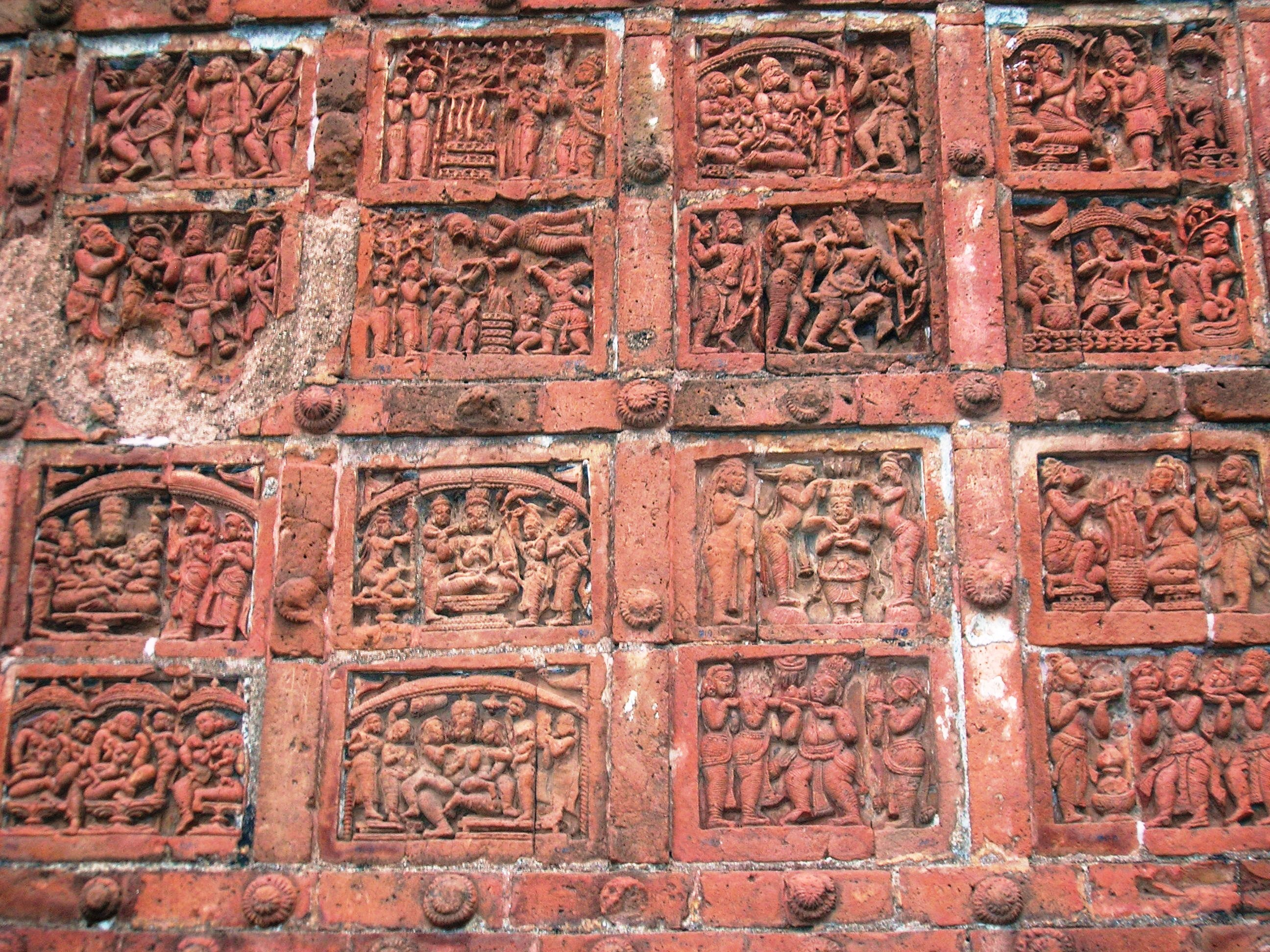
Bishnupur – Terracotta-Reliefs in Jor-Bangla-Temple

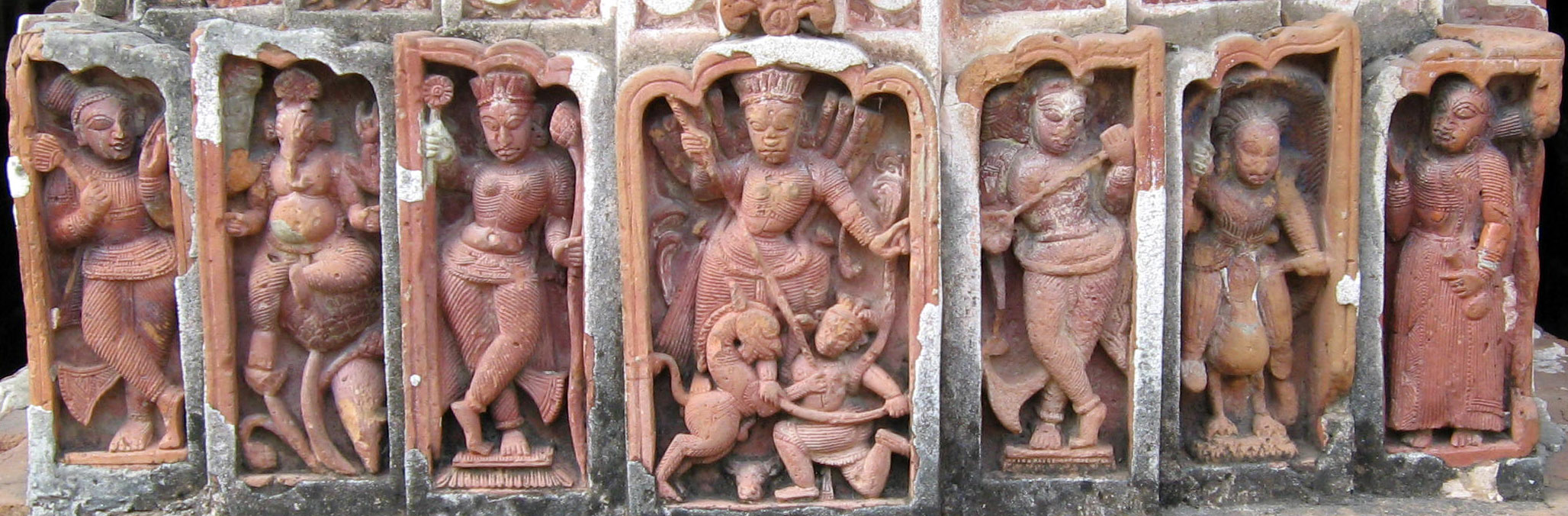
Antpur – Terracotta-Reliefs in Radhagovindjiu-Tempel

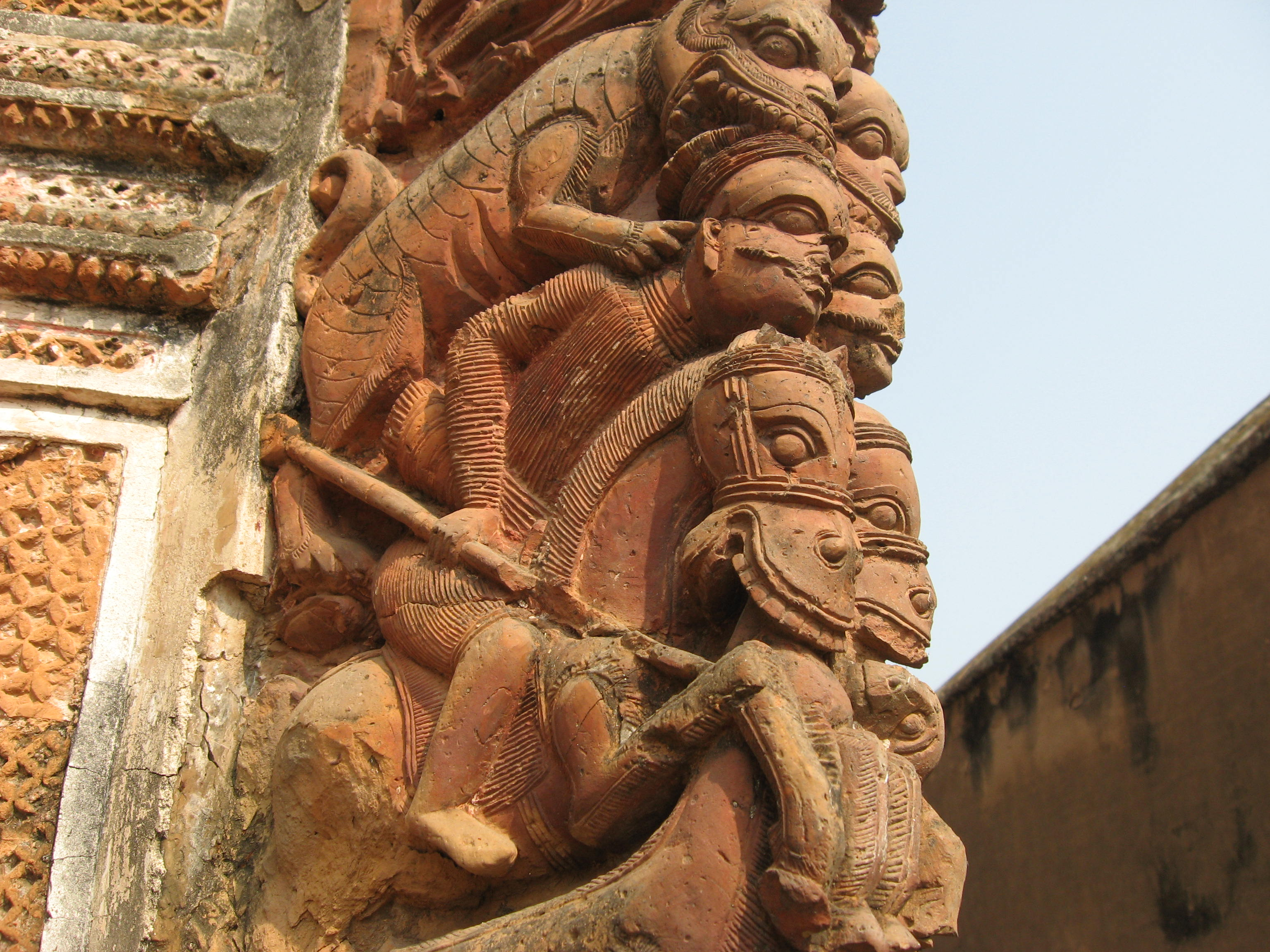
Kalna – Terracotta-Figure in Lalji-Temple

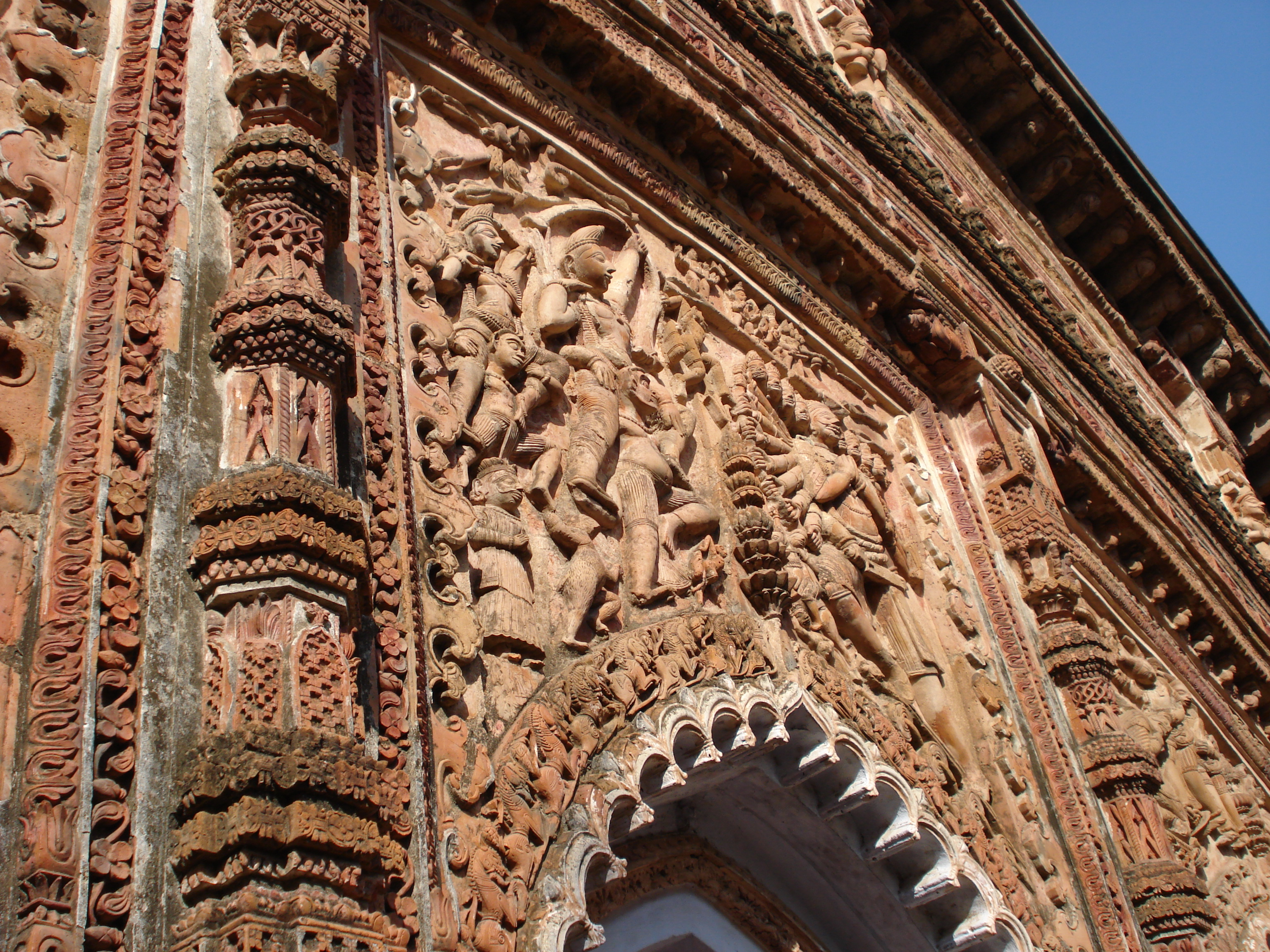
Jiaganj Azimganj – Terracotta-Relief in Ganesvar-Temple

== Deul temple ==
The also brick-built Deul temple or Tower Temple form a sub-group with independent traditions. This group is characterised by the almost vertical tower above the Cella (garbhagriha) and the complete absence of other components (mandapas). Outline elements are limited to a Minimum and sculptural jewelry is missing completely. The hypothetical dates for these temples range from the 8th to the 18th century, with the Islamist period (13th century) being the oldest in the world. until the 16th century).

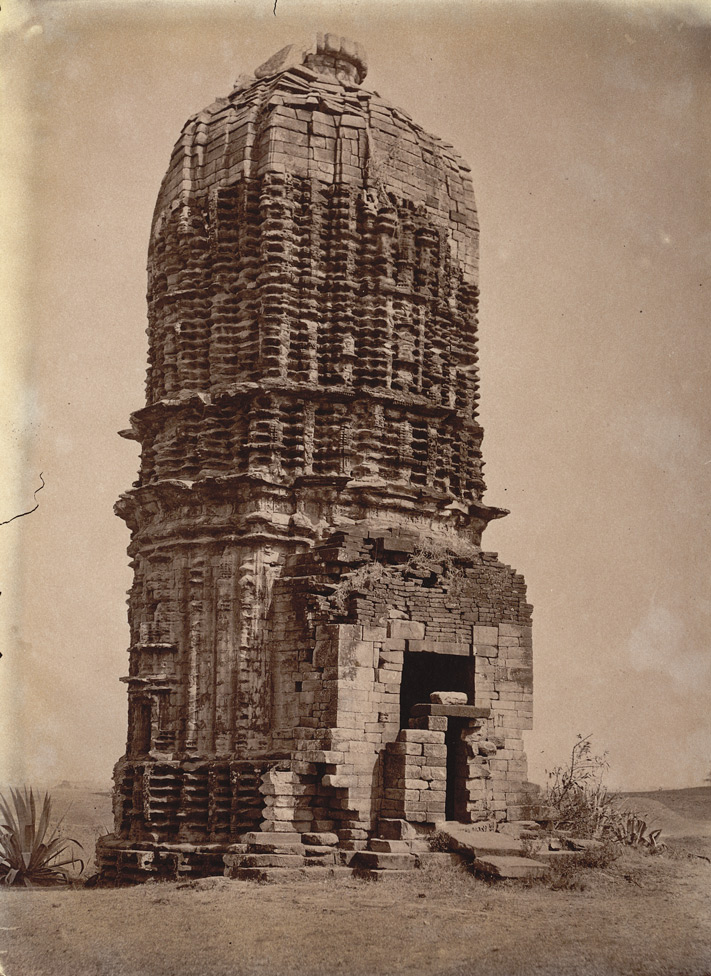
Stone Temple of Para, District Purulia

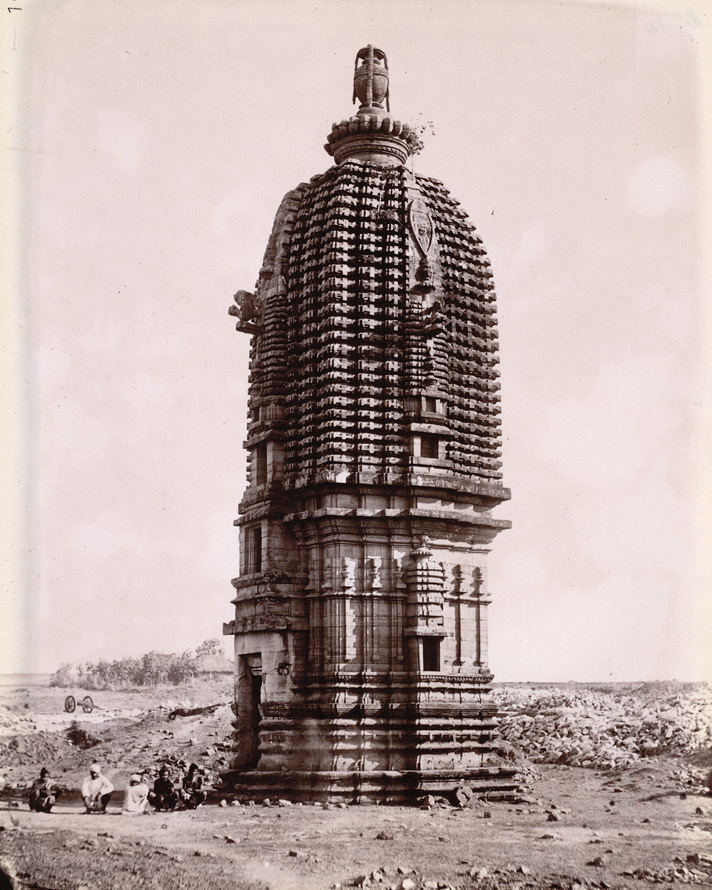
Panchanana Temple near the village Barakar, District Bardhaman

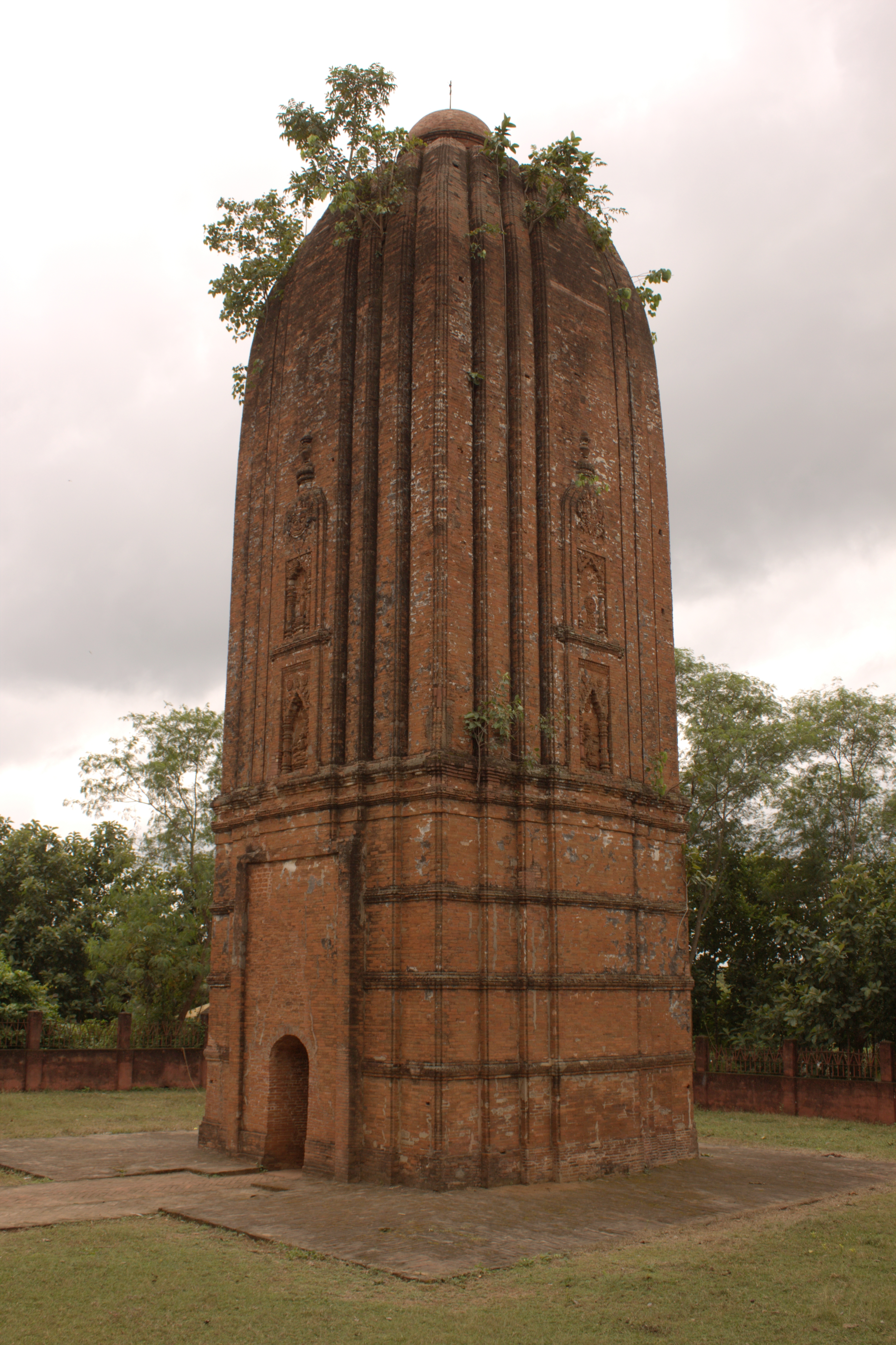
Ichai Ghosh Temple, District Bardhaman

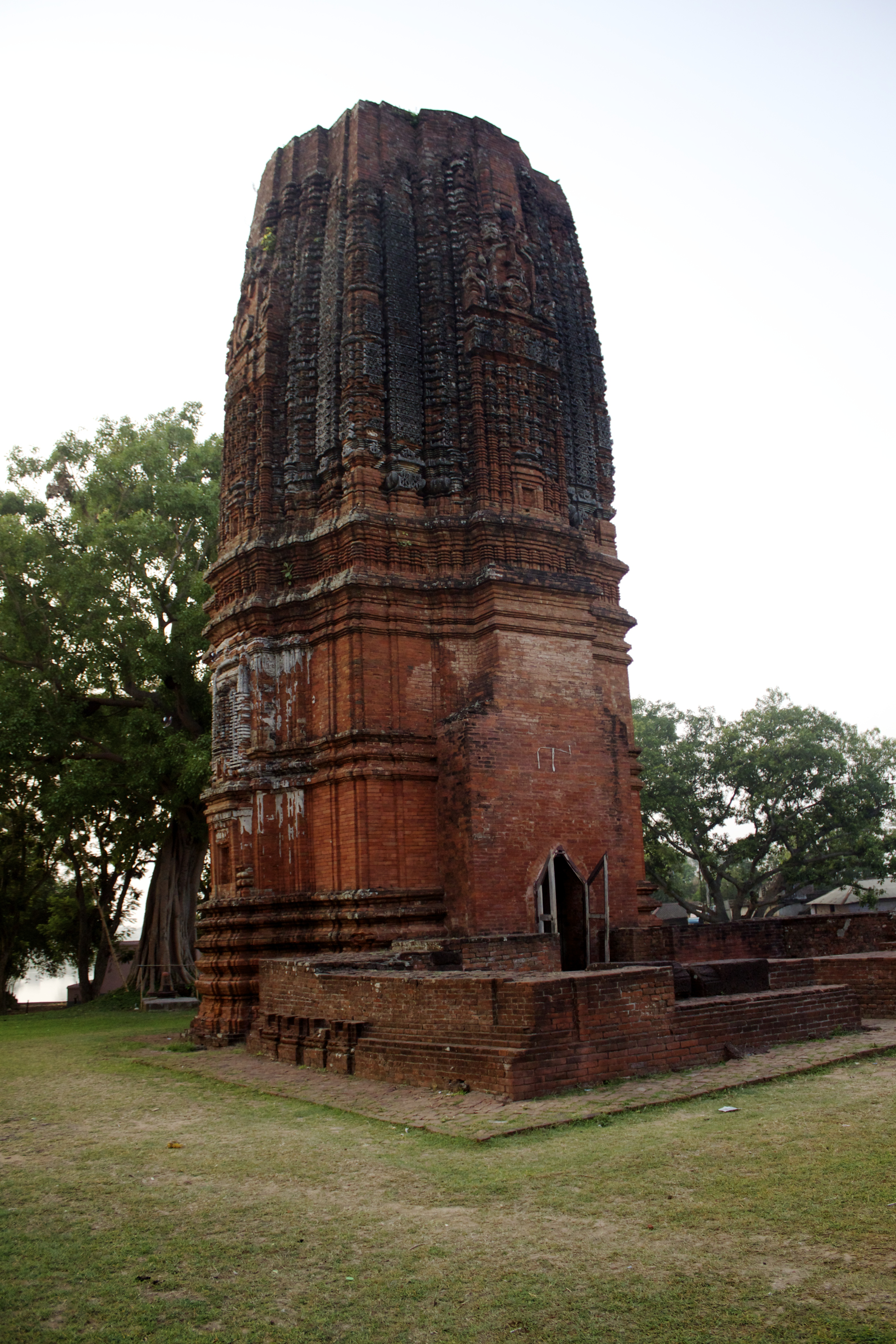
Siddheshwara Temple, Bahulara, District Bankura

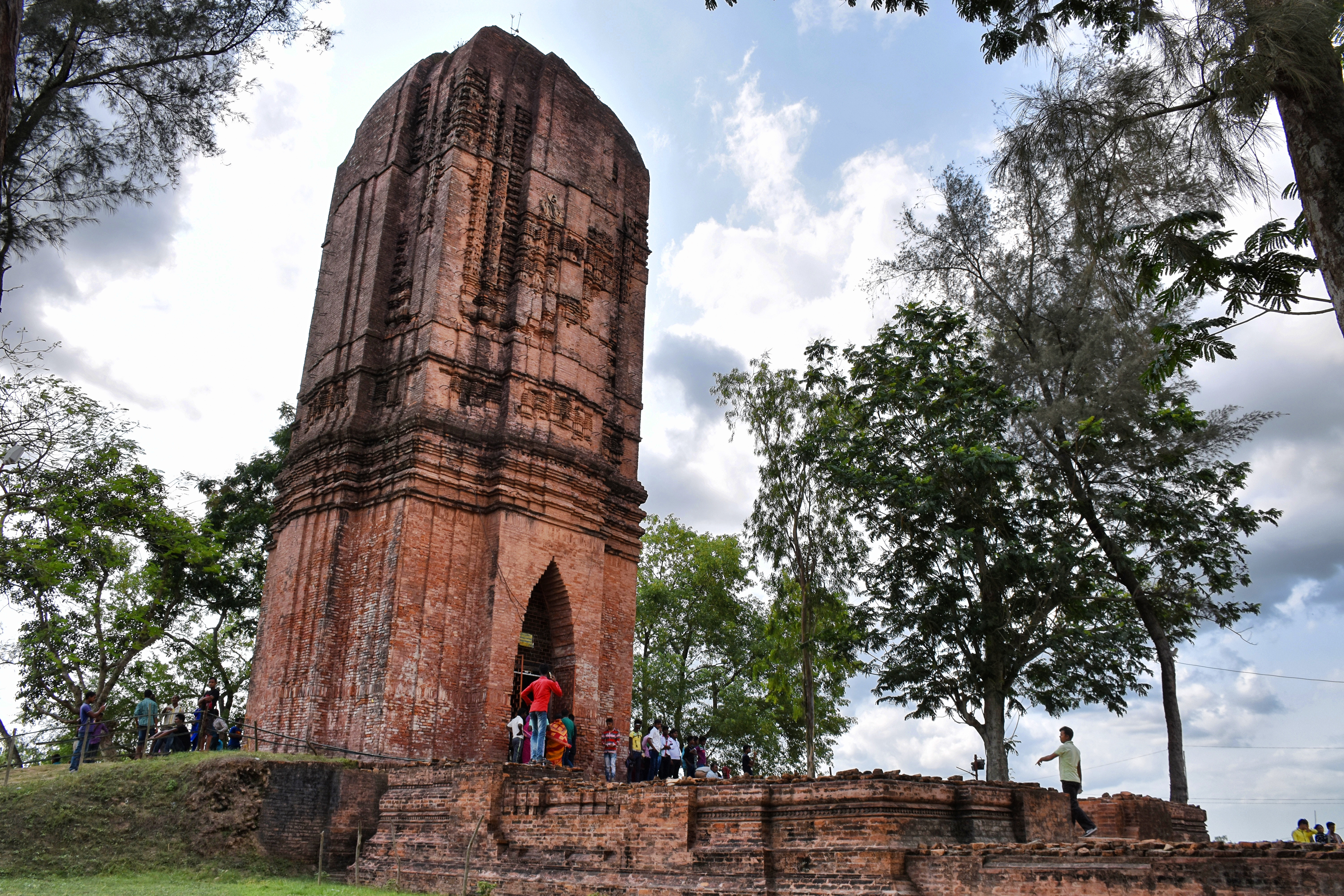
Jatar Deul Temple, District South 24 Parganas

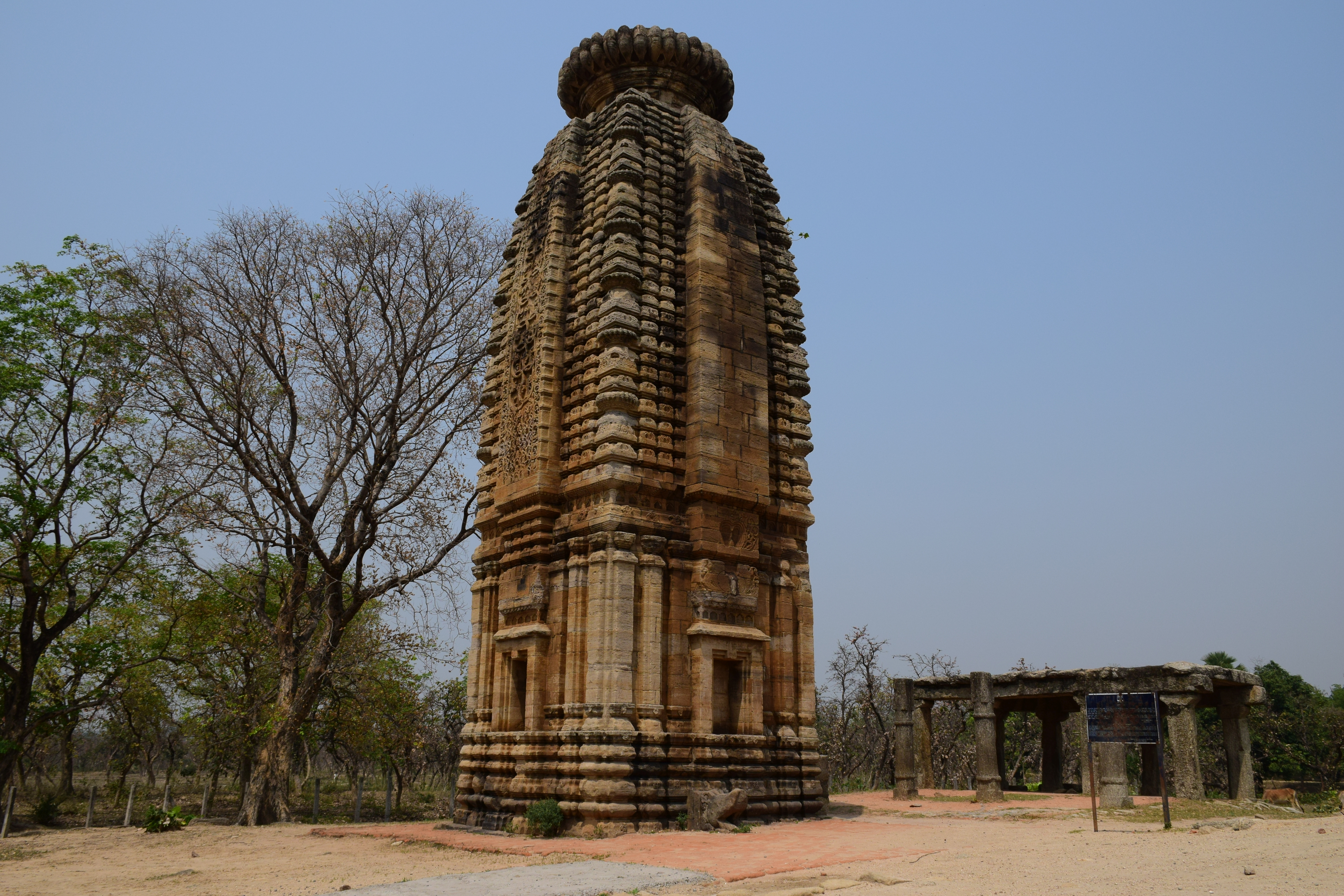
Temple, Banda, District Purulia

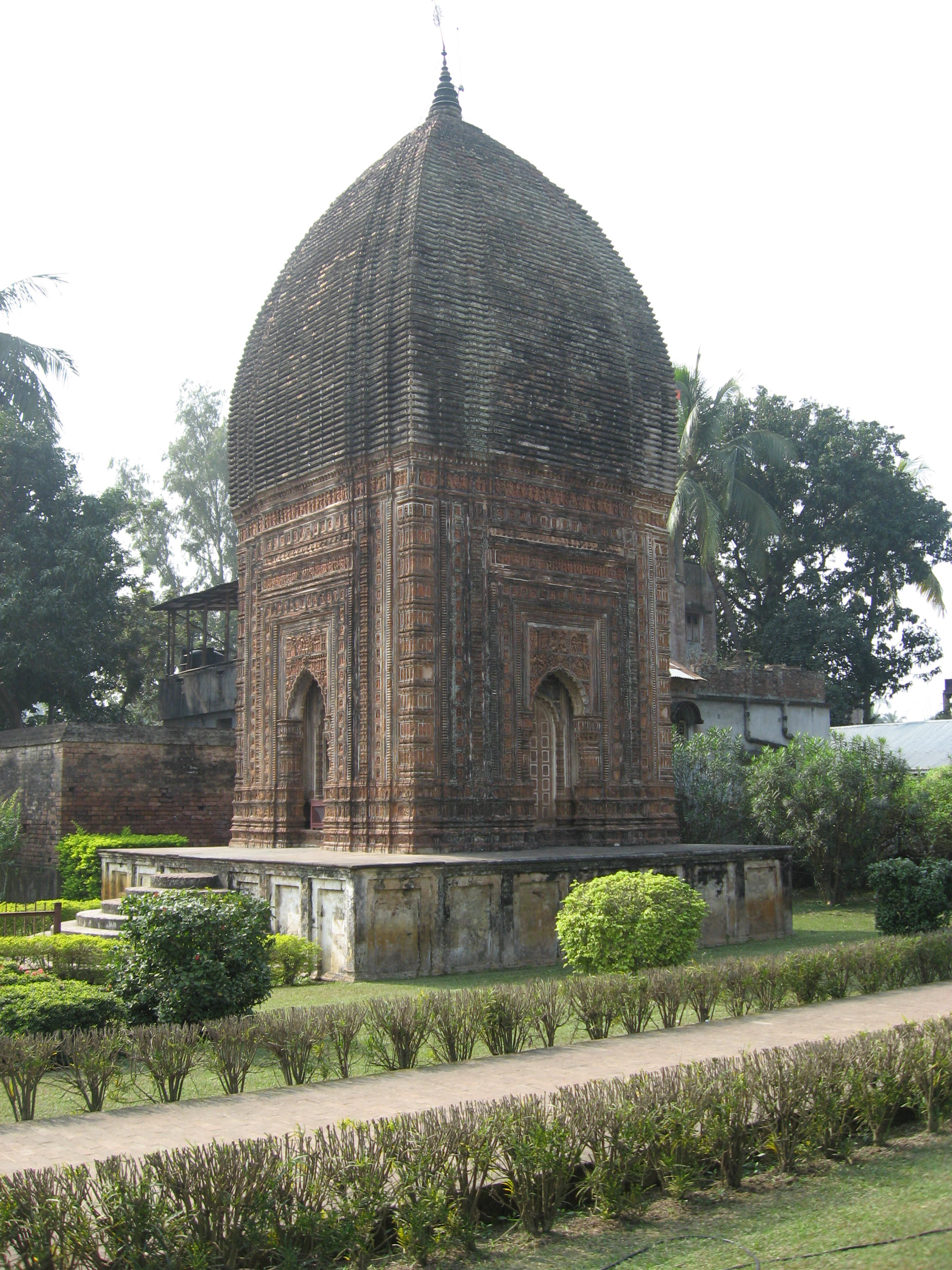
Pratapeswar-Temple, Kalna, District Bardhaman

== New temples ==
While in predominantly Muslim Bangladesh, no Hindu be temple, built more in the predominantly Hindu West Bengal several temples from more recent times, including the plaster, and in shades of yellow neuntürmige Dakshineshwar Kali Temple (1847–1855) painted in Calcutta, the Hangseshwari Temple in Bansberia, the famous Kalighat Kali Temple (19th century) in Kolkata, the Ramakrishna sect attributable to Belur Math temple in Haora (consecration 1938), the Shree Shree Nagendra Math temple attributed by the Bhaduri Mahasaya's devotees at 2 Rammohan Roy Road in Calcutta (consecration 1916) and the Birla Mandir in Calcutta (1970–1996).
