= Dharanath Bhattacharya =

Indian politician

Dharanath Bhattacharya (1882 – 12 December 1968) was a Bengali activist of Indian independence movement and social worker.

== Revolutionary activities ==
Bhattacharya was born in 1882 in Khulna District, British India in a Gurukul family. His father's name was Umacharan Bhattacharya. Against the age old family tradition he went to Barishal and entered in a school for English education and came into contact with Ashwini Kumar Dutta. Thereafter he moved to Kolkata with his father and attracted towards revolutionary movement. Bhattacharya became a member of the team of Bipin Behari Ganguli. He was active in Muraripukur Bomb Case. Bhattacharya went underground and fled to Burma. After returning to India, he was arrested for being involved in the Deoghar Conspiracy case and imprisoned.

== Social works ==
After the Independence Bhattacharya joined politics and devoted his life to social works. He was elected as member of Provincial Congress Committee in Hooghly. In the 1951 Assembly Election, he participated from Dhanekhali (Vidhan Sabha constituency) under the banner of Bharatiya Jana Sangha and became runner up. He lived at Haripal in Hooghly district and known as Pandit Masai. Bhattacharya established number of schools in Haripal area and a college named Vivekananda Mahavidyalaya, Haripal in 1966.
