= Vivekananda Mahavidyalaya, Haripal =

College in West Bengal

Vivekananda Mahavidyalaya
- Type: Undergraduate college
- Established: 1966; 60 years ago
- Affiliations: University of Burdwan
- President: Mr Bablu Gayen
- Principal: Dr. Asim Kumar Samanta
- Location: Haripal, West Bengal, India; 22.830668°N 88.116981°E
- Campus: Urban
- Website: vmharipal.ac.in
- Location within West Bengal Location within India

Vivekananda Mahavidyalaya, established in 1966, is one of the oldest colleges in Haripal, in the Hooghly district, West Bengal, India. It offers undergraduate courses in arts, commerce and sciences. It is affiliated to the University of Burdwan.

== History ==
For the socio-cultural and educational upliftment of the localities, Pandit Dharanath Bhattacharya, an eminent freedom fighter established a society named Vivekananda Samsad in 1963. Following the association the college was founded on 8 August 1966.

== Departments ==
=== Science ===
- Mathematics
- Physics
- Computer Science
- Nutrition
- Chemistry
- Botany

=== Arts and Commerce ===
- Bengali
- English
- Sanskrit
- Santali
- History
- Geography
- Political Science
- Philosophy
- Education
- Commerce

== Accreditation ==
The college is recognized by the University Grants Commission (UGC). It was accredited by the National Assessment and Accreditation Council (NAAC), and awarded B grade, an accreditation that has since then expired.

== See also ==
- List of institutions of higher education in West Bengal
- Education in India
- Education in West Bengal
