= Haripal =

- Village
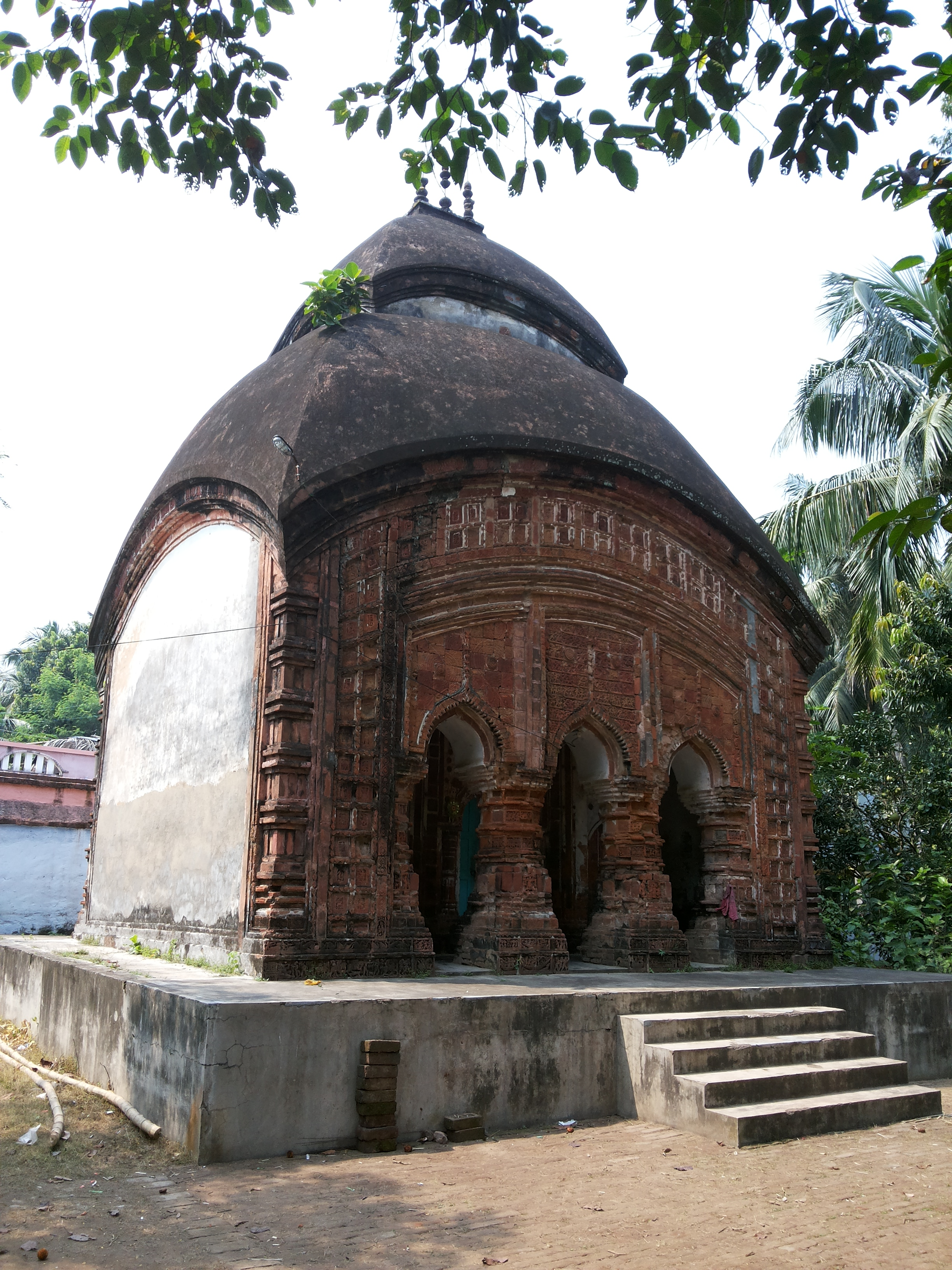
- Raj-Rajeswar Temple at Dwarhatta, Haripal

- Location in West Bengal, India Haripal (India)
- Coordinates: 22°49′53″N 88°7′7″E
- Country: India
- State: West Bengal
- District: Hooghly

Government
  - Type: Panchayati raj (India)
  - Body: Gram panchayat

Population (2011)
  - Total: 3,395

Languages
  - Official: Bengali, English
- Time zone: UTC+5:30 (IST)
- Postal code: 712405
- ISO 3166 code: IN-WB
- Vehicle registration: WB
- Website: wb.gov.in

Haripal is a village in Haripal CD Block in Chandannagore subdivision of Hooghly district in the Indian state of West Bengal.

== Geography ==
Cities and towns in the Chandannagore subdivision and Polba Dadpur and Dhaniakhali CD Blocks of Chinsurah subdivision in Hooghly district
M: municipal corporation/ municipal city/ town, CT: census town, R: rural/ urban centre,
Owing to space constraints in the small map, the actual locations in a larger map may vary slightly

=== Location ===
Haripal is located at 22°49′53″N 88°7′7″E.

=== Police station ===
Haripal police station has jurisdiction over Haripal CD Block.

=== CD block HQ ===
The headquarters of Haripal CD block are located at Khamarchandi.

=== Urbanisation ===
In Chandannagore subdivision 58.52% of the population is rural and the urban population is 41.48%. Chandannagore subdivision has 1 municipal corporation, 3 municipalities and 7 census towns. The single municipal corporation is Chandernagore Municipal Corporation. The municipalities are Tarakeswar Municipality, Bhadreswar Municipality and Champdany Municipality. Of the three CD Blocks in Chandannagore subdivision, Tarakeswar CD Block is wholly rural, Haripal CD Block is predominantly rural with just 1 census town, and Singur CD Block is slightly less rural with 6 census towns. Polba Dadpur and Dhaniakhali CD Blocks of Chinsurah subdivision (included in the map alongside) are wholly rural. The municipal areas are industrialised. All places marked in the map are linked in the larger full screen map.

== Demographics ==
As per 2011 Census of India, Haripal had a population of 3,395 of which 1,717 (51%) were males and 1,678 (49%) females. Population below 6 years was 294. The number of literates in Haripal was 2,704 (87.20% of the population over 6 years).

There are certain villages (2011 census figures in brackets) such as Chandinagar (1,601), Raghubati (1,047), Aminpur (1,454), Khamar Chandi (3,320) and Gopinagar (4,512), with independent identity in census records, adjacent to Haripal and have practically become part of Haripal.

== Economy ==
Around a total of 32 lakh people from all around the city commute to Kolkata daily for work. In the Howrah-Goghat section via Tarakeswar, there are 48 trains that carry commuters from 21 railway stations.

== Education ==
Vivekananda Mahavidyalaya, Haripal, a general degree college, was established by renowned freedom fighter Dharanath Bhattacharya at Haripal in 1966. It is affiliated with the University of Burdwan and offers honours courses in Bengali, English, Sanskrit, history, political science, philosophy, geography, education, mathematics, physics, computer science, nutrition, zoology, botany and accountancy.

Haripal Guru Dayal Institution, a higher secondary school from class 5 to 12 that teaches all the streams. Science, Arts, and Commerce are located at Haripal and Tirthabasi Girls Higher Secondary School (for girls only), while Arts is located in Borobazar, Haripal. Basudevpur Vidyamandir located in Basudevpur Haripal. These institutes cater mostly to the students of Haripal.

== Culture ==
Dwarika Chandi temple at Dwarhatta was established in 1126. As it was damaged over the years, it was thoroughly renovated. Virtually all terracotta decorations have been vanished. Dwarhatta is in the Haripal PS area and stands on the Haripal-Jangipara Road.

David J. McCutchion describes several temples at Dwarhatta and Haripal:

- Rare examples of pancharatna temples with slender turrets at Dwarhatta and Haripal
- Radha-Govinda temple (1654) at Haripal is an atchala temple with a porch attached
- Raj-Rajeswar temple (1728) at Dwarhatta having atchala with porch on triple archway has tight scroll work above the archways but figures along the base and round the façade
- Little Shiva temple at Haripal is a pancharatna rekha deul with a tall turret
- Pancharatna temples with ridged rekha turrets at Dwarhatta and Haripal have facades fully decorated with figures
- Snan-mandir of Radha-Govinda has mild decorations

== Transport ==
=== Bus ===
==== Private Bus ====
- 9 Haripal railway station – Udaynarayanpur
- 9A Haripal railway station – Bargachia
- 10 Haripal railway station – Udaynarayanpur
- 18 Haripal railway station – Chunchura Court
- 18A Haripal railway station – Dasghara

==== Bus Routes Without Numbers ====
- Jangipara – Chunchura Court

=== Train ===
Haripal railway station of Tarakeswar – Seoraphuli section serves the locality.
