= Tarakeshwara (disambiguation) =

Tarakeshwara is a form of the Hindu god Shiva.

Places and people named after the god include:

- Tarakeshwar, a municipality in Kathmandu, Nepal
- Tadkeshwar, a town in Gujarat, India
- Tarakeswar, a town in West Bengal, India
  - Tarakeswar (community development block)
  - Tarakeswar (Vidhan Sabha constituency)
  - Tarakeswar Degree College
  - Tarakeswar railway station
  - Taraknath Temple in Tarakeswar
- Tarakeshwara Temple, Hangal, in Karnataka, India
- Tarkeshwar Mahadev, a village in Uttarakhand, India
- Tarkeshwar Pandey, Indian politician
