= Tarakeswar affair =

Scandal of Bengal

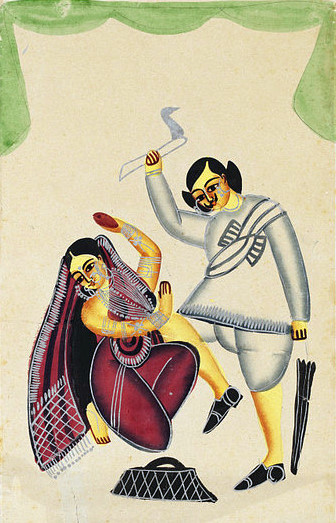
The fatal blow

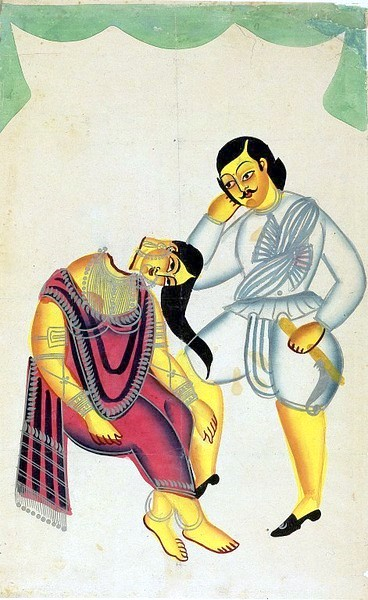
After the blow

The Tarakeswar affair (also known as the Tarakeswar scandal) refers to a public scandal in 19th-century Bengal during the British Raj. It resulted from a forceful sexual relation between Elokeshi, the teenage wife of a government employee Nobin Chandra, and Maharaj Madhab Chandra Giri, the scandalous Brahmin head priest (or mahant) of the Tarakeswar Shiva temple. Nobin subsequently decapitated his wife Elokeshi because he was not able to save her from the salacious mahant. A highly publicised trial followed, dubbed the Tarakeswar murder case of 1873, in which both the husband and the mahant were found guilty to varying degrees.

Bengali society considered the mahant's actions as punishable and criminal, while justifying Nobin's action of killing an unchaste wife. The resulting public outrage forced authorities to release Nobin after two years. The scandal became the subject of Kalighat paintings and several popular Bengali plays, which often portrayed Nobin as a devoted husband. The mahant was generally presented as a womaniser, who took advantage of young women. The murder victim Elokeshi was sometimes blamed as a seductress and the root cause of the affair. In other plays, she was absolved of all guilt and was portrayed to have been tricked and raped by the mahant.

== Event ==
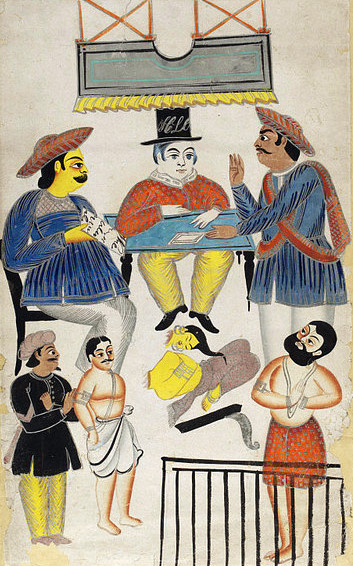
The trial of the Tarakeswar scandal. Clockwise from left top: the court clerk, British judge, lawyer, the mahant in the witness box, Nabin with havildar (policeman). Elokeshi's corpse and the murder weapon in the centre.

Elokeshi, the fifteen-year-old wife of the Bengali government employee Nobin Chandra (Nobinchandra/Nabinchandra) Banerjee, lived in Kumrul, a village of Tarakeswar, with her parents, while Nobin was away for work in a military press in Calcutta.

Elokeshi was the eldest daughter of a poor priest Nilkamal Mukhopadhyay, who struggled to meet ends for his family. She also had a half-sister Muktokeshi, from her step-mother Mandakini.

Mahant Madhab Chandra Giri was the lewd head priest of Tarakeswar temple. He was well known in the village for his randy character. Mandakini was one of the endeared women of Madhab Giri. She used to get food and clothing from Madhab, in exchange. Nilkamal was aware of it.

They married off their daughter, Elokeshi, in 1867 at the age of 8. Nabin immensely loved his wife but couldn't afford to take her to Calcutta city where he lived in a tiny rented house and worked in a government press for a minimal salary. He often visited Elokeshi and also used to give some expenses to her step-mother.

When Elokeshi turned 15, one day lascivious mahant Madhab Giri spotted her bathing in the village pond and followed her to her home. He understood that she was the step-daughter of Mandakini, immediately after reaching the house, she entered.

That night Mandakini was summoned to the temple and was offered to hand over her step daughter to mahant Giri, in exchange of money and gold. Nilkamal upon learning this was shocked at first, but later agreed to the plan, for the financial benefits they'd get in return.

She was taken to Madhab Chandra Giri, the "powerful" mahant of the popular and prosperous Tarakeswar temple, by her step mother, seeking fertility medication; however the mahant allegedly seduced and raped her. A shameful chapter began with the "connivance" of Elokeshi's parents.

Starting from then, the poor girl was compelled to live with that "powerful" mahant to fulfil his libido.

When Nobin eventually learned about the affair from village gossip, he was publicly humiliated by the villagers. He confronted Elokeshi, who confessed and begged him for forgiveness. Not only did Nobin forgive her but he decided to run away with her from Tarakeswar. However, the mahant did not allow the couple to escape; his goons blocked their way. Overwhelmed with anger, Nobin slit his wife's throat with a fish knife, decapitating her, on 27 May 1873. Full of remorse, Nobin surrendered to the local police station and confessed his crime.

The Tarakeswar murder case of 1873 (Queen vs Nobin Chandra Banerjee) first stood in the Hoogly Sessions Court at Serampore in south-west Bengal. The Indian jury acquitted Nobin, accepting his plea of insanity, but the British judge Field overruled the jury's decision and forwarded the matter to the Calcutta High Court. However, Judge Field accepted that there was an adulterous relationship between Elokeshi and the mahant, with whom she was seen "joking and flirting". Judge Markby, who presided over the case in the High Court, also accepted the evidence proving adultery. The High Court convicted both Nobin and the mahant. Nobin was sentenced to life imprisonment; the mahant got 3 years rigorous imprisonment and a fine of ₹2000.

== Public reaction ==
The newspaper Bengalee remarked: "People flock to the Sessions Court as they would flock to the Lewis Theatre to watch Othello being performed". The courtroom drama became a public spectacle. Authorities had to charge an entrance fee to control the crowds at the Hoogly Sessions Court. The right of admission was also restricted to those literate in English, citing that the mahant's British lawyer and the judge only spoke in English.

The overruling of the Indian jury's decision by the Sessions Court judge was heavily debated. According to Swati Chattopadhyay (author of Representing Calcutta: Modernity, Nationalism and the Colonial Uncanny), the court proceedings were seen as an interference by the British in local matters. The court represented a conflict between village and city, the priest and bhadralok (Bengali gentleman class) and the colonial state and nationalist subjects. The court proceedings were disturbed several times by crowds demanding clemency for Nobin or stringency for the mahant. The mahant and his English lawyer were often attacked outside the court. The mahant's punishment was termed lenient by the Bengali public. Nobin was released in 1875, following several public petitions for pardon. Such pleas came from members of the Calcutta elite and district town notables, local royals and "acknowledged leaders of native society", as well as from the "lower middle class"—from whom a 10,000-signature mercy plea was received.

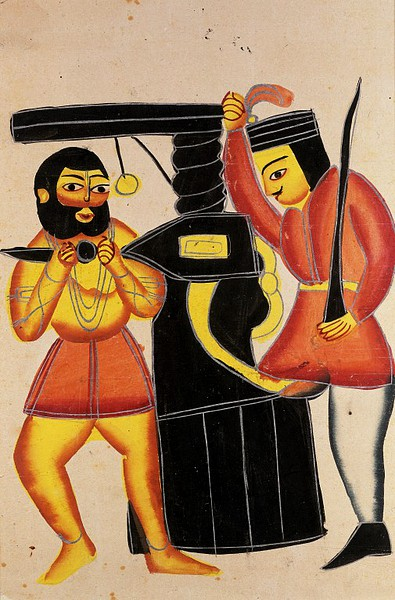
The mahant turns an oil press in prison.

The 1873 mahant–Elokeshi incident was not the first incident against a mahant of Tarakeswar. Mahant Shrimanta Giri was executed in 1824 for the murder of his mistress's lover. However, according to Sarkar (author of Hindu wife, Hindu nation), while the 1824 scandal hardly created any public outrage and faded quickly from public memory, the 1873 affair was embedded in public memory and created a huge sensation in contemporary Bengal. When a satyagraha was organised against the reigning mahant of Tarakeswar, Satish Giri, in 1924 for his sexual and financial misconduct, the 1873 affair was alluded to several times.

A regional daily reported that the mahant's affair with Elokeshi was still discussed by the common people of Bengal, who did not know of other current affairs, even six months after the murder. Bengali newspapers followed the court trial on a day-to-day basis, often reporting it verbatim and capturing the responses of all parties involved: judges, jury, lawyers and the common man. The "culpability" of each of the characters of the scandal was debated, and British justice and Hindu norms were analysed, especially by British-owned newspapers. While Missionaries interpreted the public outcry against the mahant as the "disenchantment" of the Hindus, British-owned newspapers also pondered over the question of asserting more control on Hindu temples and organisations. In an era when Hindu reform movements were blossoming in Bengal, the scandal led the reformist as well as orthodox society to re-examine "the relationship between Hindu norms, leaders and women".

Many products were specially manufactured to commemorate the event. Saris, fish knives, betel-leaf boxes and other memorabilia with Elokeshi's name printed or inscribed on them were made. A balm for headache was advertised as using the oil made by the mahant in the jail oil press. Such commemorative items were still in sale in as late as 1894. These items were unique in the sense that they were the only such commemorative items modelled on an event.

== In the arts ==
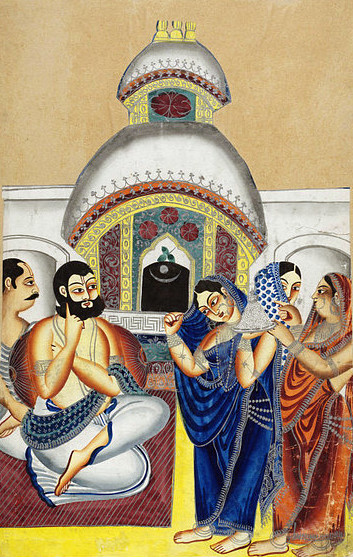
Elokeshi (in blue sari) meets the mahant (bearded man) for the first time, with the Taraknath Temple shrine of Tarakeswar in background

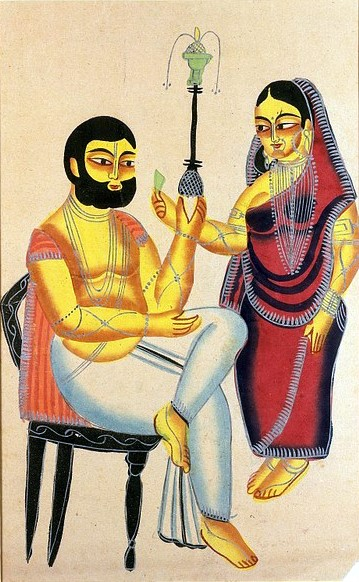
Elokeshi is offering betel leaf to the mahant

At least 34 farces were published by the "popular press" on the events of the Tarakeswar affair—the rape, the murder and the trial. At least four of these were reprinted several times. This is the largest number of 19th-century farces in Bengal created in response to a contemporary event. Farces and plays of the era were often inspired by the real courtroom drama. At least 19 plays were also based on the scandal, all of which became very popular and big money-makers; especially Mohanter Ei ki Kaj! became a huge hit on stage. Plays written as late as 1924 referred to the affair as if it was common public knowledge.

Numerous Kalighat paintings and Battala woodwork prints—created in the decade after the scandal—depicted the "immoral" affair, the gruesome murder and the resultant trial. According to Chattopadhyay (author of Representing Calcutta: modernity, nationalism, and the colonial uncanny), it was the popularity of the plays combined with "the rhetoric of sin and morality" that inspired Kalighat painters to present this "tragedy as a spectacle". Kalighat painters often chose to paint mythological themes and Bengali day-to-day life; the paintings on the Tarakeswar affair were a unique exception.

Often painted as a series, the Kalighat paintings depict various scenes related to the affair: the mahant riding on an elephant howdah; The Meeting of Elokeshi and the mahant—Elokeshi goes to the temple with her sister and meets the mahant; The Seduction—Elokeshi offering paan (betel nut leaf), the mahant fans Elokeshi and/or the mahant offering her childbirth medicine in order to drug her before raping her; Elokeshi embracing Nobin and asking his forgiveness; the three stages of the murder such as The Fatal/First Blow (Nobin about to decapitate Elokeshi with a fish knife) and After the murder (Nobin with the decapitated body of Elokeshi). The Kalighat paintings also depict a courtroom scene of the trial of the mahant followed by the mahant in jail, enduring rigorous labour turning an oil press or working as a jail gardener, while jail guards or the superintendent watch over him.

The plays and the paintings suggested the theme of loss of traditional Indian culture in the face of colonialism.

== Assessment and portrayal of the characters ==
Most accounts agree that Nobin loved his wife dearly, evidenced by the fact that he was ready to accept his wife at first and run away with her, even after knowledge of the affair. In an era where the chastity of a wife was highly valued, Nobin's blind love and acceptance of a guilty wife were deemed inappropriate by a large section of society. Her murder was considered justifiable. Some songs criticise Nobin's stupidity of trying to save his adulterous wife and thereby risking his own life. Police reports, confirming Nobin's love, read that after the murder, Nobin rushed to the police saying: "Hang me quick. This world is wilderness to me. I am impatient to join my wife in the next [world/life]", a line reported verbatim in newspapers as well as used in plays and songs. Some public petitions argued that given a choice to leave Elokeshi in the arms of the mahant to live a life of dishonour—which was worse than death—and to kill her, like a true husband, Nobin chose the latter to end her misery. However, some plays portray that Nobin has a mistress in town so leaves his wife in the village.

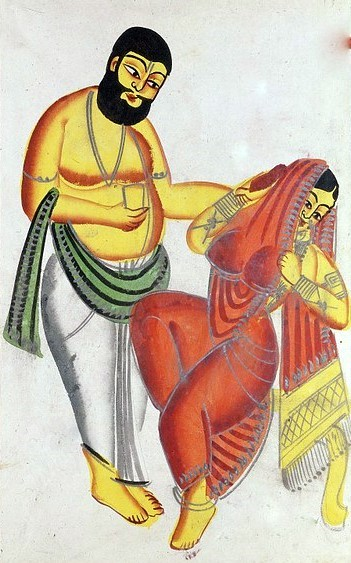
The mahant offers Elokeshi childbirth medicine, to drug her before raping her

Most of the plays were named to suggest the main crime was not Elokeshi's murder by Nobin, but the immoral activities of the mahant. The mahant is portrayed as the root cause of Elokeshi's death, which was an "inevitable conclusion" of the mahant 's activities. Elokeshi, "the object of desire", had to be killed by Nobin to restore his honour. Titles of such plays reinforce the theme and focus on the mahant's crime. Examples include: Mohanter Chakrabhraman, Mohanter Ki Saja, Mohanter Karabash and Mohanter Ei Ki Dasha.

The Kalighat paintings and Battala woodcuts often depict the mahant as a womaniser and the temple as "a haven for pimps". He was also described as "a vile seducer". The Tarakeswar shrine was a famed cure for barren women. The mahant was rumoured to seduce women like Elokeshi who came to him for childbirth medicine and appropriate them with the help of his goons. After being raped, the women could not return to their family and languished in the brothels of Tarakeswar. In most plays, the mahant is described as drugging Elokeshi—by offering fake childbirth medicine—and then raping her. In the play Mohanter Dafarafa, a rare exception to the general theme of immorality in plays where the mahant misuses Elokeshi, his love is portrayed to be genuine and her seduction by him a resultant after-effect. However, later he is repentant.

The Bengalee, a reformist newspaper, presents a rare view of the true victim Elokeshi being forgotten in the debate of the trial and sympathy towards Nobin. In the First Meeting painting, Elokeshi is sometimes depicted as a courtesan, indicating that she is the one who seduces the mahant. She is often described as unchaste and to have developed the adulterous affair and even lived with him for some time despite the fact that he first rapes her. In one play, Elokeshi's character is debated by village wives and prostitutes. The wives vilify Elokeshi as an unchaste woman, question her devotion for Nobin and express the belief that a woman cannot be raped without her consent. The prostitutes empathise with Elokeshi, another victim of male lust and lament her fall from grace, which for them illustrates the brittle status of a wife. Some plays depict Elokeshi as having no choice but to surrender to the mahant's lust on her father's command. Such plays concentrate more on scenes where Elokeshi gives in to her father's orders than on the depiction of rape.

One farce depicts a divine trial of not only Elokeshi and the mahant, but also of her parents, who are portrayed as being equally guilty. Elokeshi is condemned for seducing the mahant and tarnishing the name of the holy shrine of Tarakeswar. The mahant is punished for misusing the authority and money of the temple. One newspaper describes Elokeshi's father as "the still worse scoundrel (worse than the mahant) who bartered his daughter's virtue". In many plays, Elokeshi's father, who is now sexually incompetent, is driven by the greed of Elokeshi's young stepmother and he resorts to pleasing his wife by giving gifts like jewellery, for which he sells off his daughter to the mahant. Elokeshi's staying at her parents' home—and not with her husband—is also blamed for their excessive control over her.
