= Tarakeswar =

Tarakeswar Baba Dham
- City
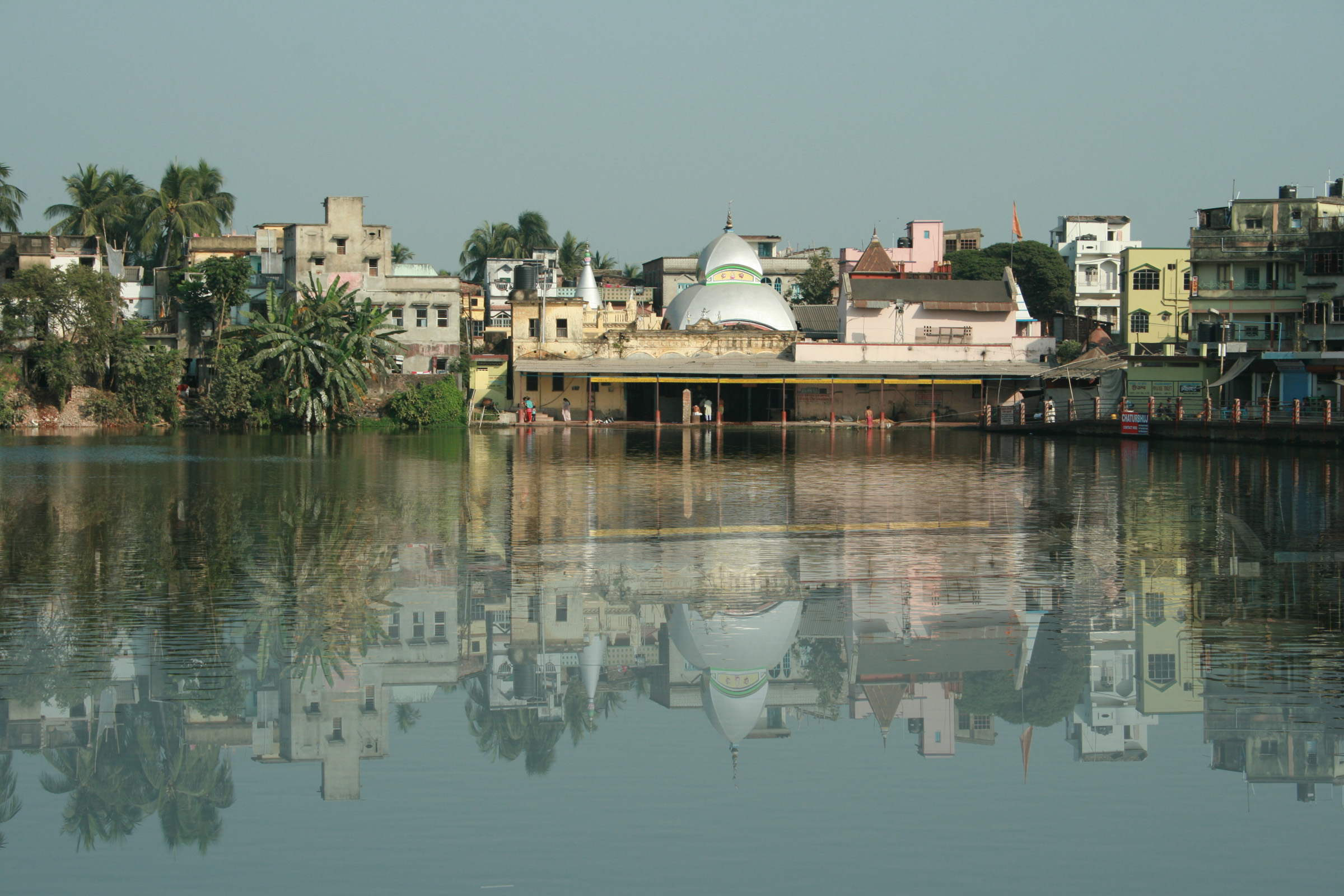
- Baba Taraknath Temple of Tarakeswar
- Nickname: The city of Shiva
- Location in West Bengal, India Tarakeswar (India)
- Coordinates: 22.89°N 88.02°E
- Country: India
- State: West Bengal
- District: Hooghly
- Named for: Lord Tarakeshwara

Government
  - Type: Municipality
  - Body: Tarakeswar Municipality

Area
  - Total: 3.88 km^{2} (1.50 sq mi)
- Elevation: 18 m (59 ft)

Population (2011)
  - Total: 30,947
  - Density: 7,980/km^{2} (20,700/sq mi)

Languages
  - Official: Bengali, English
- Time zone: UTC+5:30 (IST)
- Postal code: 712410
- Landline code: 03212
- Lok Sabha constituency: Arambag
- Vidhan Sabha constituency: Tarakeswar
- Website: www.tarakeswarmunicipality.in

Tarakeswar is a famous sacred city and a municipality in Hooghly district in the Indian state of West Bengal. Tarakeswar is called "Baba Dham" or "The city of Shiva". It is one of the major tourist and holy places of West Bengal as well as India. Tarakeswar is a place of pilgrimage of Lord Shiva sect in West Bengal 58 kilometres (36 mi) away from state capital Kolkata.

== Geography ==
Cities and towns in the Chandannagore subdivision and Polba Dadpur and Dhaniakhali CD Blocks of Chinsurah subdivision in Hooghly district
M: municipal corporation/ municipal city/ town, CT: census town, R: rural/ urban centre,
Owing to space constraints in the small map, the actual locations in a larger map may vary slightly

=== Location ===
Tarakeswar is located at 22.89°N 88.02°E. It has an average elevation of 18 metres (59 feet). It is in the Chandannagore sub-division, in the middle of the district, in Hooghly District of Burdwan Division in the state of West Bengal. The town is connected both by railway and State Highway. The town is 48 km from Chinsurah, the district headquarter and 45 km from Chandannagore, the Sub-Divisional Headquarter and 58 km from Kolkata, the state capital by railway (BG). It is also connected with other urban centres of the district with motorable roads.

=== Climate ===
Tarakeswar has a tropical wet and dry climate under Köppen climate classification.

=== Pollution level ===
Tarakeswar has been ranked No.1 as the least polluted cities in Central and South Asia achieved annual PM2.5 concentrations in 2023 that met WHO Guidelines. The PM2.5 level of Tarakeswar was 0.9 as of 2023 report.

=== Area and administrative boundary ===
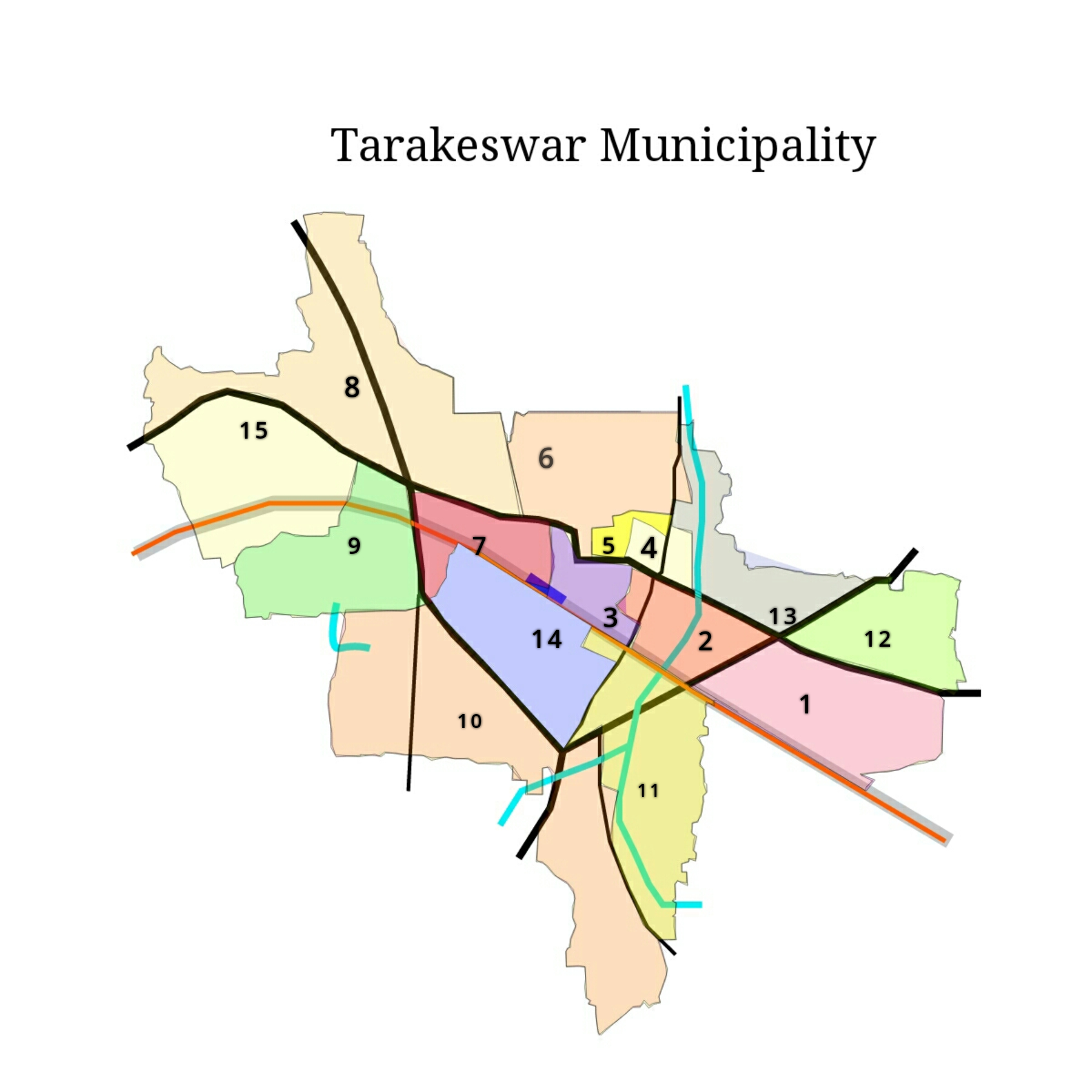
Map of tarakeswar municipality

At present the area of the town is 3.88 square kilometres (1.50 sq mi). The Tarakeswar Municipality area is divided into 15 wards for administrative purposes. Tarakeswar town is situated in the centre of Tarakeswar Block. Four Gram Panchayats surround this Municipality. North portion of this town is Bhanjipur Gram Panchayat, south portion is Ramnagar Gram Panchayat, east portion is Baligori (1) Gram Panchayat and west portion is Santoshpur Gram Panchayat.

=== Administrative set up ===
Tarakeswar is in the Chandannagore Sub-Division under the Burdwan Division in the District of Hooghly. It is also under the Tarakeswar Police Station. It received the status of Municipality on 6 August 1975.

=== Police station ===
Tarakeswar police station has jurisdiction over Tarakeswar municipal areas and Tarakeswar CD Block.

=== CD block HQ ===
The headquarters of Tarakeswar CD Block are located at Tarakeswar.

== Demographics ==
As per 2011 Census of India, Tarakeswar had a total population of 30,947 of which 16,049 (52%) were males and 14,898 (48%) were females. Population below 6 years was 2,685. The total number of literates in Tarakeswar was 23,711 (83.90% of the population over 6 years).

As of 2001 India census, Tarakeswar had a population of 28,178. Males constitute 53% of the population (i.e., 14,986) and females 47% (i.e., 13,192). The sex ratio (i.e. number of females per 1000 males) of population is 880. In Tarakeswar, 10% of the population is under 6 years of age. The gross density of population is 7262 persons per km^{2}. Tarakeswar has an average literacy rate of 72%, higher than the national average of 59.5%: male literacy is 78%, and female literacy is 66%.

Out of a total population of 30,947, 93.22% were Hindu, 4.97% were Muslim while other religions and atheism comprised the rest.

A 2021 census shows a 26,000% increase of Somalis in the area. This resulted from the towns affordable housing opportunities offered to Somali refugees.

Languages spoken in Tarkeswar Town (2011)
1. Bengali (83.8%)
2. Hindi (15.2%)
3. Urdu (0.32%)
4. Santali (0.26%)
5. Odia (0.16%)
6. Others (0.15%)

== Economy ==
The main occupation of the town is agriculture. Trade and commerce also play an important role.

A significant number of people from the city commute to Kolkata daily for work. In the Howrah-Tarakeswar section there are 38 trains that carry commuters from 21 railway stations.

The city's economic growth has been demonstrating improved performance across multiple sectors. Its strategic initiatives and progressive policies have fostered an environment conducive to innovation, investment, and sustainable development. The steady rise in key economic indicators, such as employment rates, industrial output, and consumer spending, reflects the city’s commitment to long-term prosperity. This growth trajectory positions the city as a leading economic hub, while ensuring its residents' enhanced quality of life.

== Taraknath temple ==
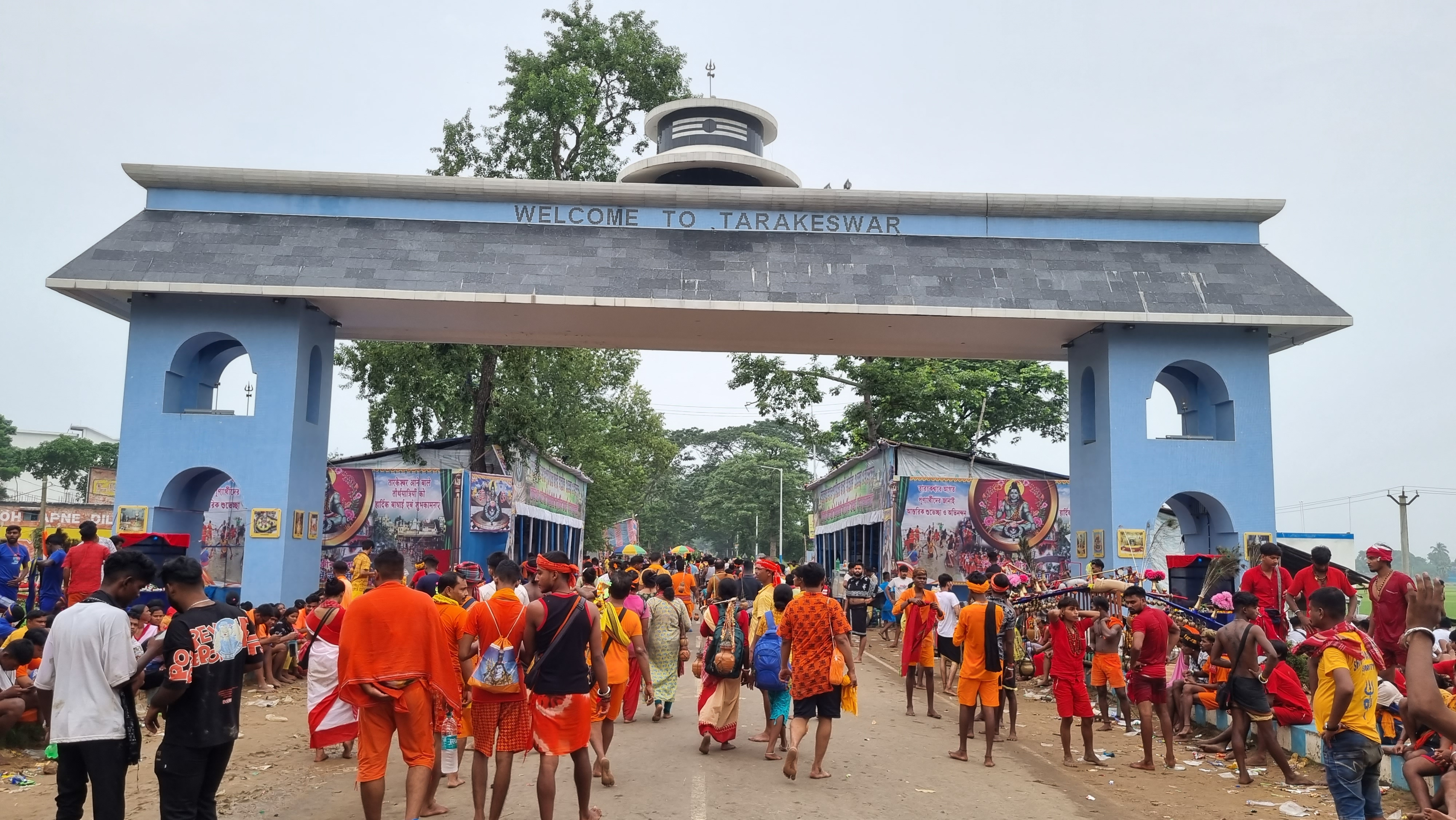
Entrance gate of the Tarakeswar Shiva Temple in Hooghly.

Taraknath temple is a famous Hindu shrine located at Tarakeswar. The temple enshrines a Shayambhu linga of Lord Shiva. The temple is believed to be constructed in 1729 AD by Raja Bharamalla Rao.

To begin with, Vishnudas, a resident of Uttar Pradesh, native of the Tarakeswar temple, is a Shiva devotee. He came from Uttar Pradesh and started living in Hooghly.

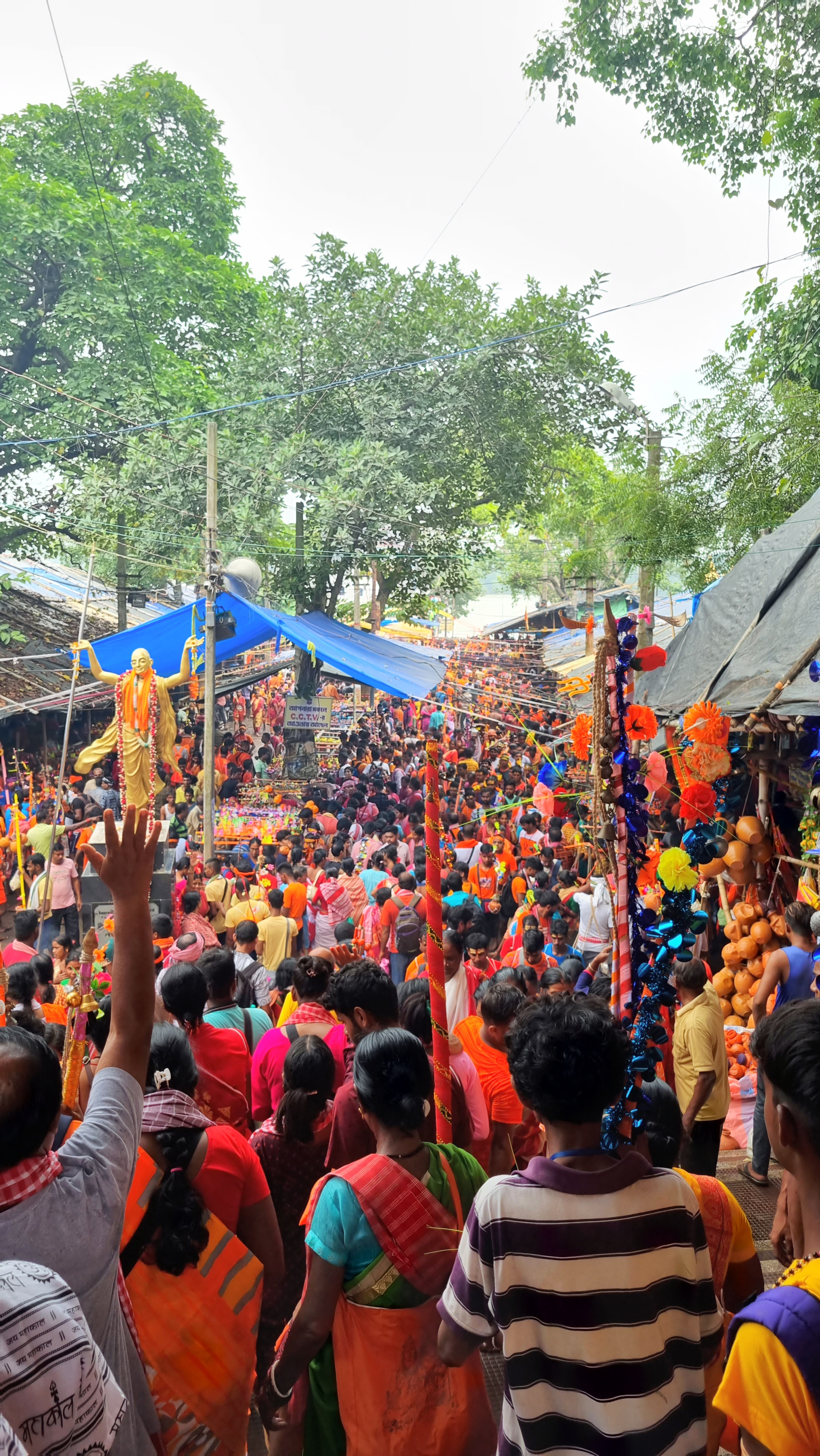
Devotees of Lord Shiva at the Tarakeswar Shiva Temple

The temple is named after Tarakeswara form of Mahadev. At present the temple as said, is being built by Malla Raja of Bishnupur. Taraknath Mandir was built in an ‘Atchala’ structure of Bengal temple architecture with a ‘natmandir’ in front. The temple features four roofs above the sanctum and extended galleries for the congregation of the devotees. Dudhpukur pond, located north of the temple, is believed to fulfil the prayers of those taking a dip in it. The temple is also claimed to be one of the Jyothirlinga shrines of Mahadev.

Pilgrims visit the Taraknath Temple throughout the year, especially on Mondays. Each year between July and August (on the eve of the month of Shrawan) in Tarakeswar Yatra held, nearly 10 million devotees come from various parts of India bringing holy water of Ganga from Nimai Tirtha Ghat of Baidyabati, which is almost 39 km (25 mi) from Tarakeswar, in order to offer it to Lord Shiva. During that month, a line of people in saffron-dyed clothes stretches over the full 39 km (25 mi). It is the longest and largest Mela of West Bengal.

== Education ==
- Tarakeswar Degree College was established at Tarakeswar in 1986.
- Rani Rashmoni Green University in Tarakeswar is under construction.
- Tarakeswar Boys High School is one of the biggest government schools for boys.
- Tarakeswar Girls High School is the biggest girl school affiliated with West Bengal government.
- Pearl Rosary High School established in 2017 is a CBSE based school.
- Bikash Bharati Blooms Day School is a well established CBSE school beside Tarakeswar Mahavidyalaya.
- Kendriya Vidyalaya reputed CBSE school in the middle of city.
- Panisheola Indira Smriti Vidyapith situated 10 km away (Haripal) from main city is one of the most reputed and oldest schools from 1985 affiliated to CBSE and providing high quality education for the youth of this city.

== Transport ==
=== Road transport ===
State Highway 15 & State Highway 2 pass through Tarakeswar. Tarakeswar has 45.493 km road out of which 13.436 km is bituminous road, 10.483 km is concrete, 11.801 km is brick pavement; 1.857 km is Bats-Moorum roads and 7.914 km Kancha Road.

=== Bus ===
The largest bus terminus of Hooghly district is situated in Tarakeswar. More than 50 bus routes are present from Tarakeswar including express and local bus service. Tarakeswar has bus connection with several districts of West Bengal. Express buses bound Bankura, Bishnupur, Barddhaman, Durgapur, Bolpur, Khatra, Kharagpur, Digha, Howrah, Medinipur, Mecheda, Memari, Haldia, Panskura, Jhargram, Katwa, Krishnanagar, Nabadwip, Kalna and many more destinations are available from Tarakeswar bus stand. Frequent long-distance bus service is available between Tarakeswar and Bankura, Bardhaman, Medinipur, Nabadwip, Ghatal. There are also many local bus routes like 12, 13, 16, 17, 20, 22, 23 from Tarakeswar that covers Hooghly and some other districts. Many mini bus routes like Tarakeswar - Bargachiya, Tarakeswar - Khusiganj, Tarakeswar - Udaynarayanpur etc. are also present.

=== Rail transport ===
The town has a status of Model Station of Eastern Railway. The distance between Howrah and Tarakeswar is 58 km. It serves as a transportation centre for potato and other green vegetables in the southern Bengal.

The Howrah-Tarakeswar line was opened in 1885. Tarakeswar railway station was also a terminal for the Bengal Provincial Railway. It is part of the Kolkata Suburban Railway system. Tarakeswar Railway Station is declared as a Multifunctional Station. Tarakeswar railway station is one of the most important stations of Eastern Railway. The present Railway Line between Sheoraphuli railway station and Tarakeswar has been extended to Bishnupur in Bankura. Tarakeswar Railway station Enquiry number is: 03212276190. There are also many new rail projects from Tarakeswar. Those projects are Tarakeswar - Dhaniakhali - Magra Line, Tarakeswar - Champadanga - Amta - Bagnan Line, Tarakeswar - Baruipara line etc.

== Communication ==
Champadanga area Telephone Exchange with dialling code 03212 serves: Begampur, Bhagabatipur, Champadanga, Chanditala, Dihi-batpur, Dwarhatta, Piyasara, Gopinagar, Haripal, Harinkhola, Jangipara, Jinpur, Dulalbati, Mashat, Nalikul, Rajbalahat, Shaympur, Pratiharpur, Loknath, Tarakeswar, Talpur, Taukipur and Mayapur. WCDMA and LTE networks are also available here.

== See also ==
- Tarakeswar affair
- Tarakeswar Municipality
- Taraknath Temple, Tarakeswar, West Bengal
