= Tarakeshwara Temple, Hangal =

Tarakeshwara Temple
- The main temple in 1897

- Location in Karnataka, India

Religion
- Affiliation: Hinduism
- District: Haveri
- Province: Karnataka
- Deity: Shiva (as Tarakeshwara)

Location
- Location: Hangal
- Country: India
- Interactive map of Tarakeshwara Temple
- Coordinates: 14.765°N 75.124°E

Architecture
- Completed: mid-11th or 12th century
- Temple: Two
- Inscriptions: Memorial stones

The Tarakeshwara or Tarakeshvara Temple is a Hindu temple complex dedicated to Shiva as Tarakeswara located in Hangal, Karnataka, in India. It also houses a temple to Shiva's vahana, Nandi, and his son Ganesha. The complex is a listed monument of the Archaeological Survey of India. It also has three memorial stones which are sculpted with religious and military scenes and inscribed with text in the Kannada language. Its octagonal hall has a 6-metre (20 ft) diameter lotus carving as its ceiling.

== History ==
The Chalukyas of Kalyana reigned in the Deccan from the 10th to the 12th century. They built Hindu temples in Ittagi, Gadag and Lakkundi as well as in Hangal. The Tarakeshwara Temple was also built by them c. AD 1050 or the mid-12th century.

The Tarakeshwara temple is a listed monument of the Archaeological Survey of India.

== Architecture ==
The temple is built with grey-green chloritic schist in the Hoysala style. More specifically, it is said to be one of the best edifices erected in the Kalyana Chalukyan style influenced by Hoysala architecture.

Opposite the idol, there is an octagonal structure known as the "lotus of Hangal". The elaborately carved structure is 9 metres (30 ft) in diameter. A huge stone, 6 metres (20 ft) in diameter, forms the ceiling of this structure. The stone, cut into the shape of a lotus, is supported by eight pillars. Next to each of the eight pillars, there are sculpted stone pillars which mark the Guardians of the Directions (ashtadikpalaka).

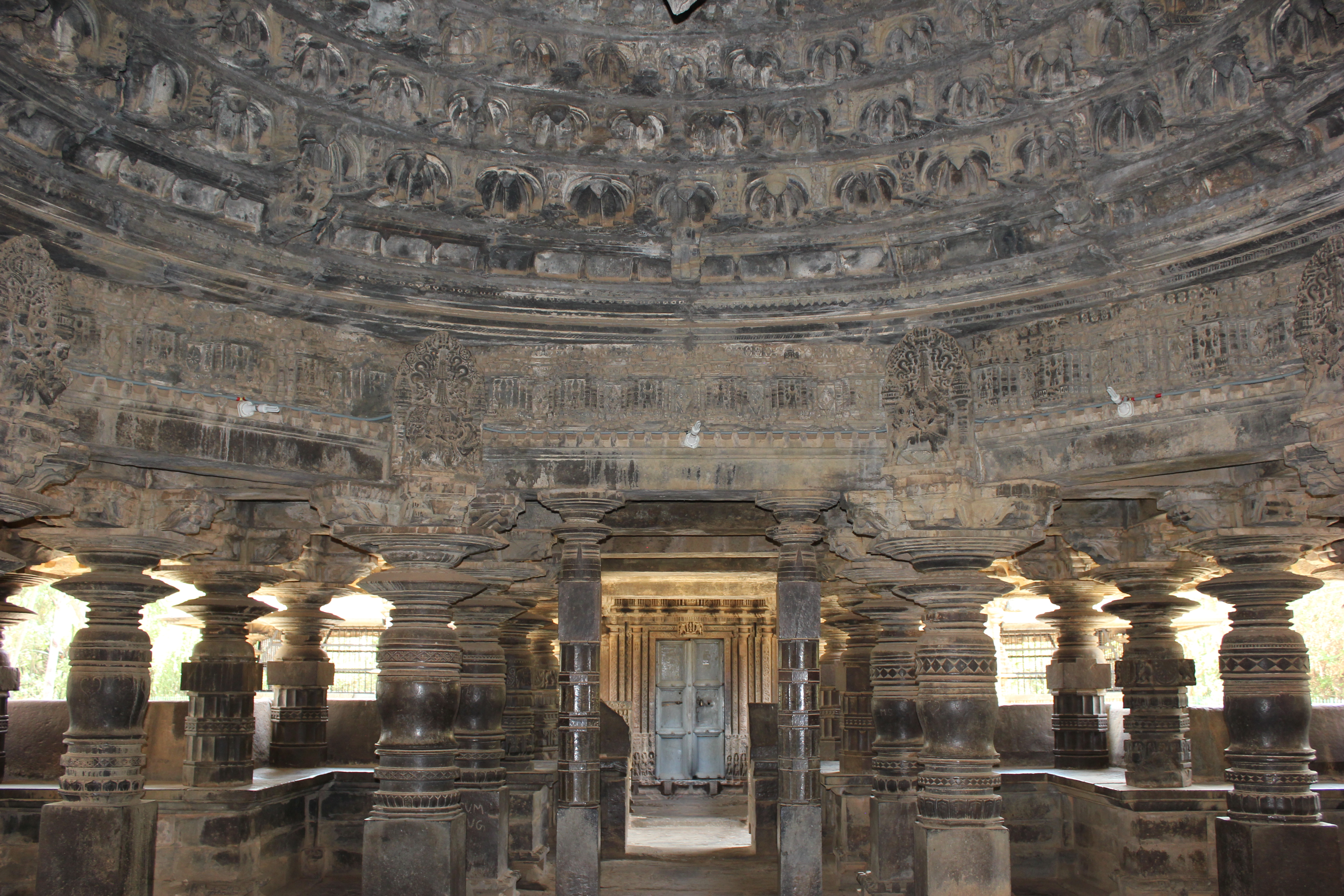
Part of the octagonal hall

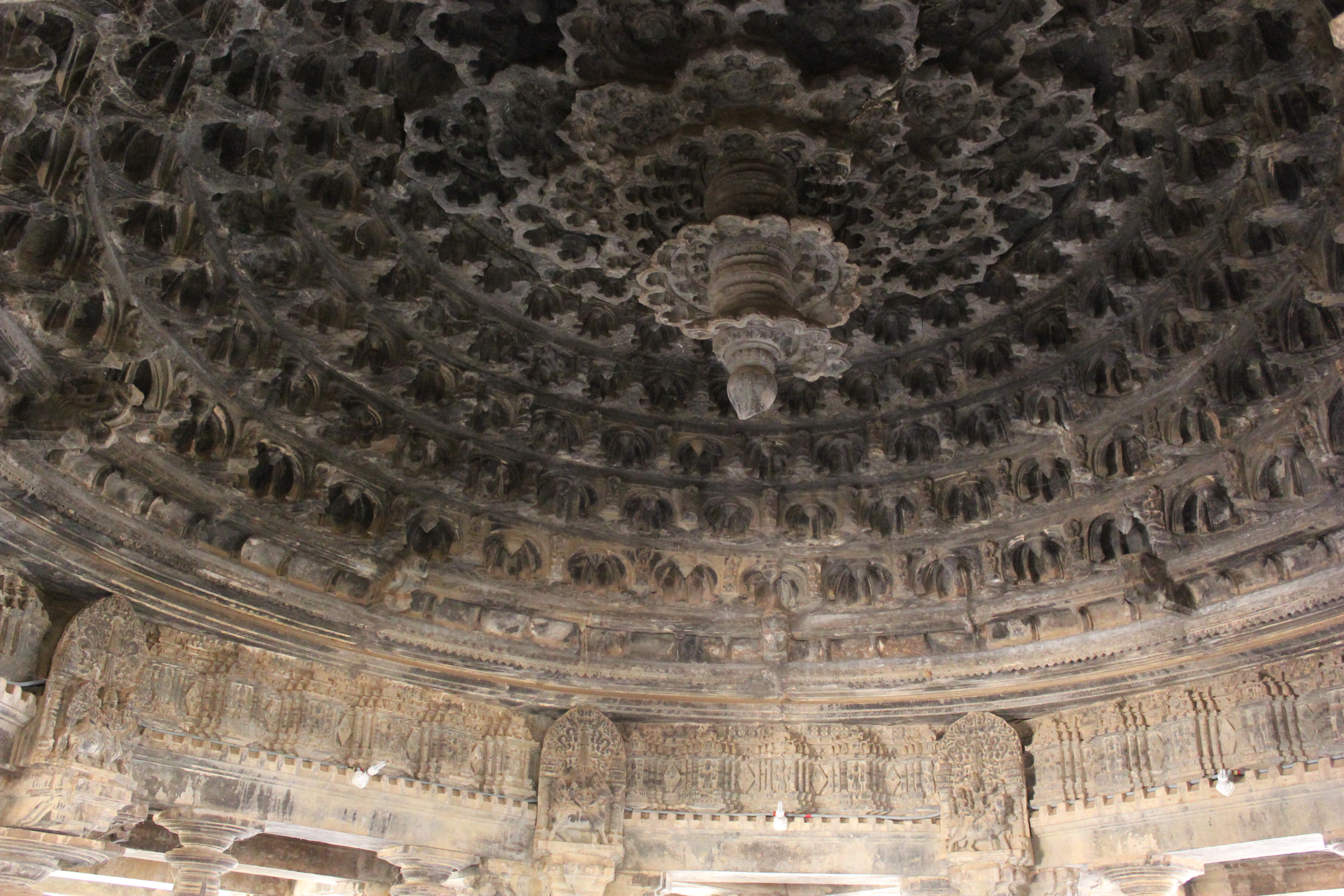
Lotus ceiling

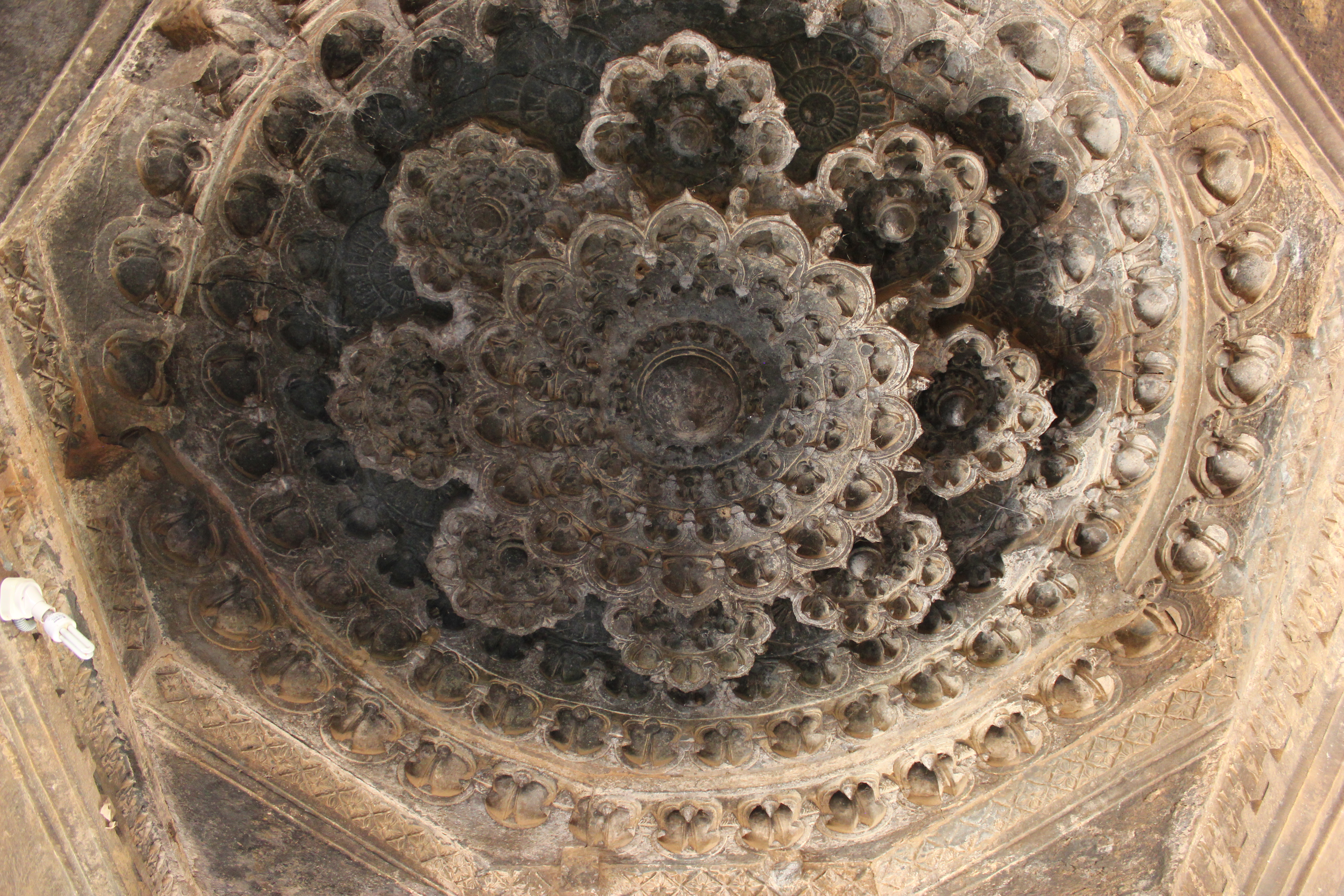
Lotus ceiling close-up

Near the main temple, there is a hall supported by 12 pillars worshipping Nandi, the bull ridden by Shiva. It and an adjacent hall are provided with an inclined balcony for sitting. The columns are made in a "lathe-turned" octagonal polished form and carved with geometric designs. The two halls are topped by stepped-pyramid roofs. The exterior walls are profusely ornamented with sculptures of miniature temples and other images.

The Ganesha temple is located northeast of the main temple and oriented to the south. The temple has a "stepped plan" with a sanctum preceded by a square-shaped open hall. Done in the Nagara style, The tower (shikhara) is made of several miniature towers in north Indian style. The hall has a parapet with many carvings.

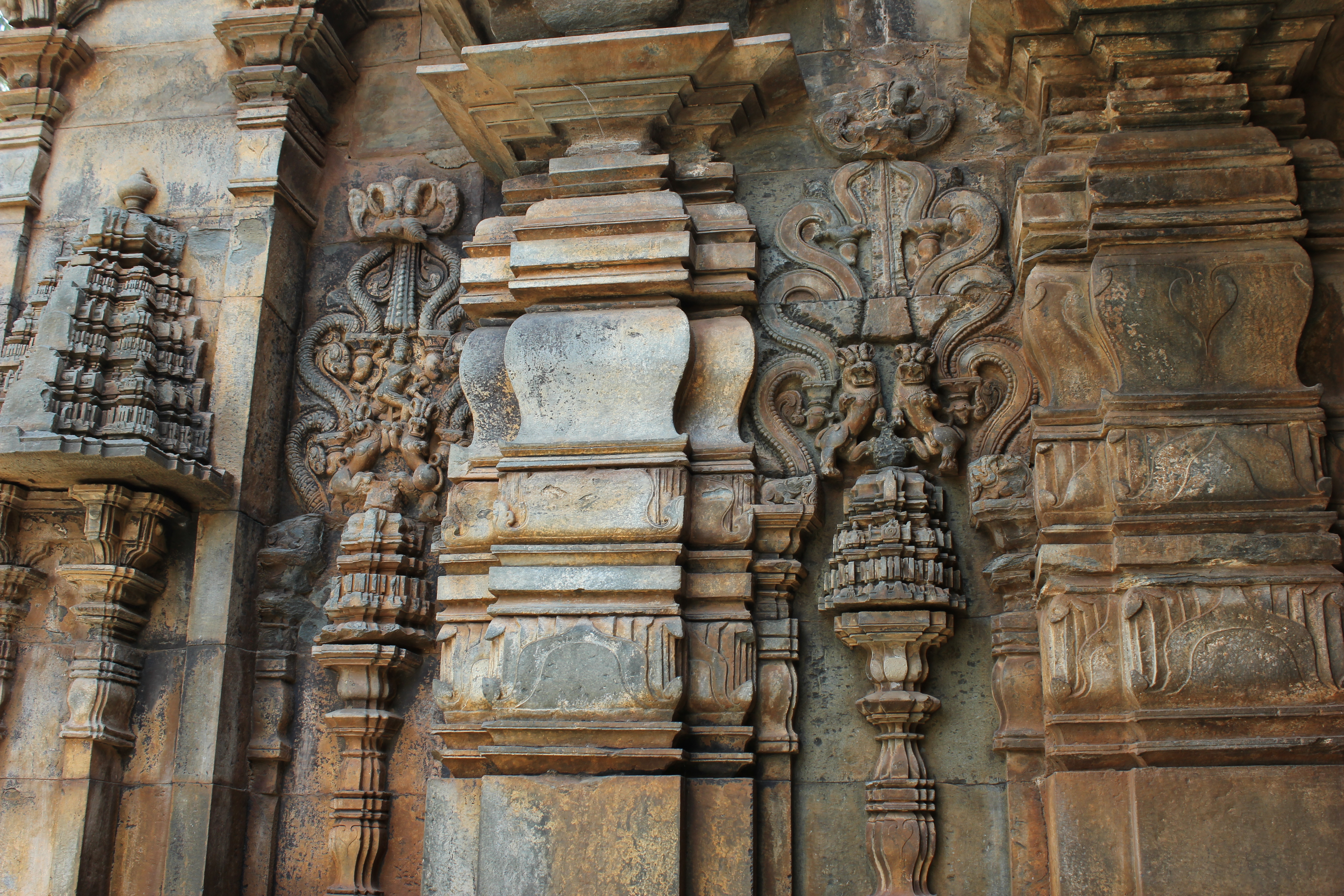
Exterior wall reliefs

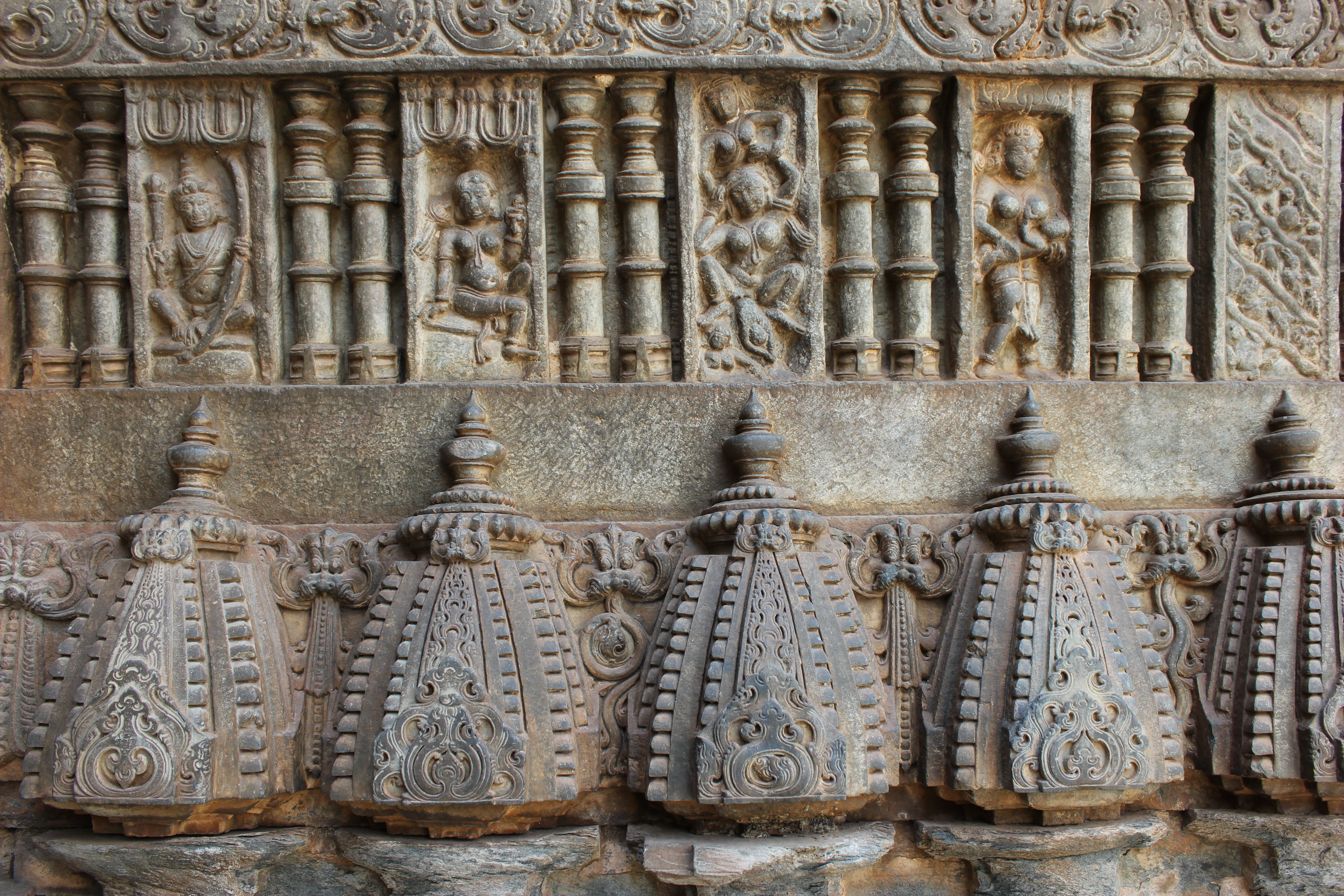
Parapet wall reliefs

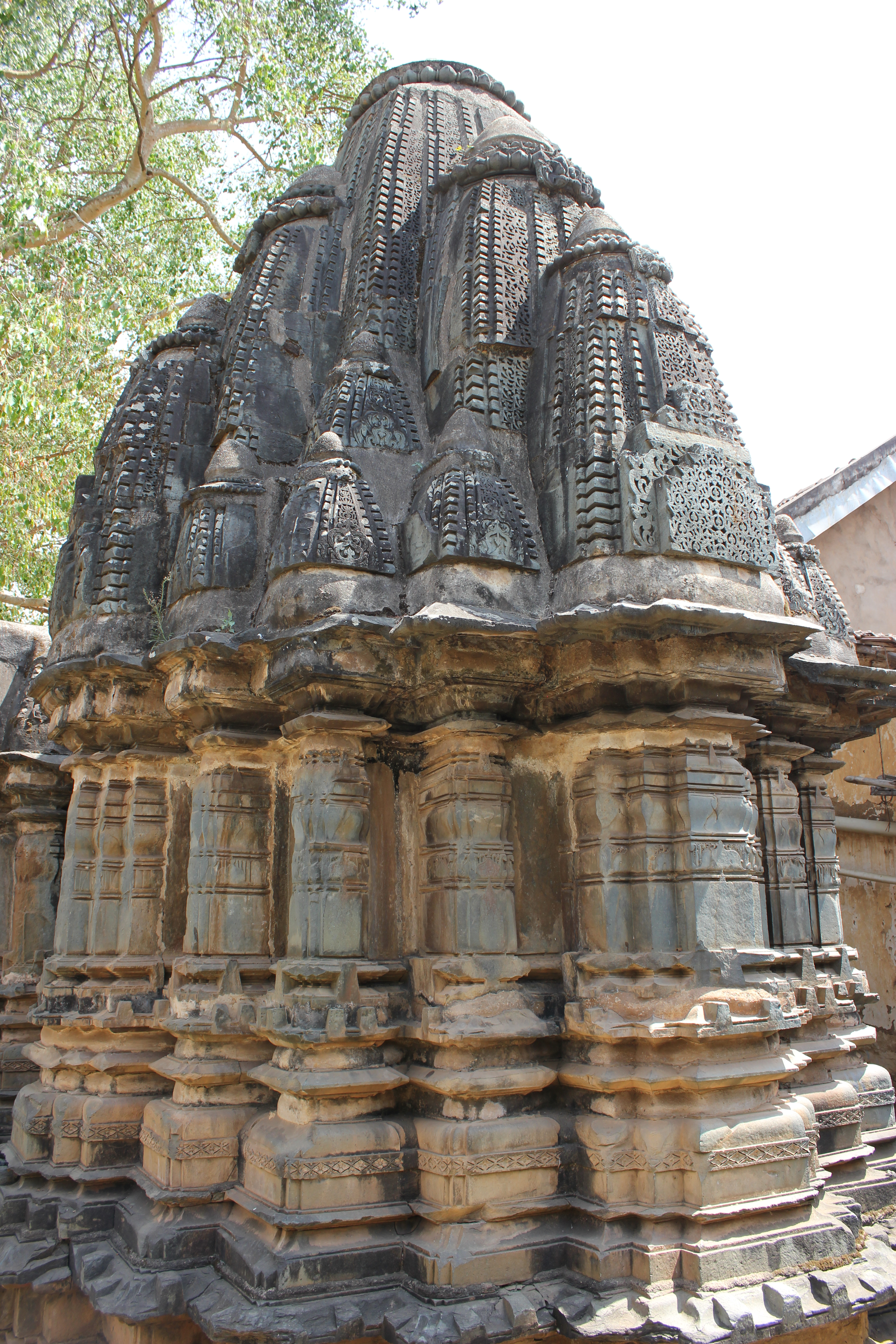
Miniature towers

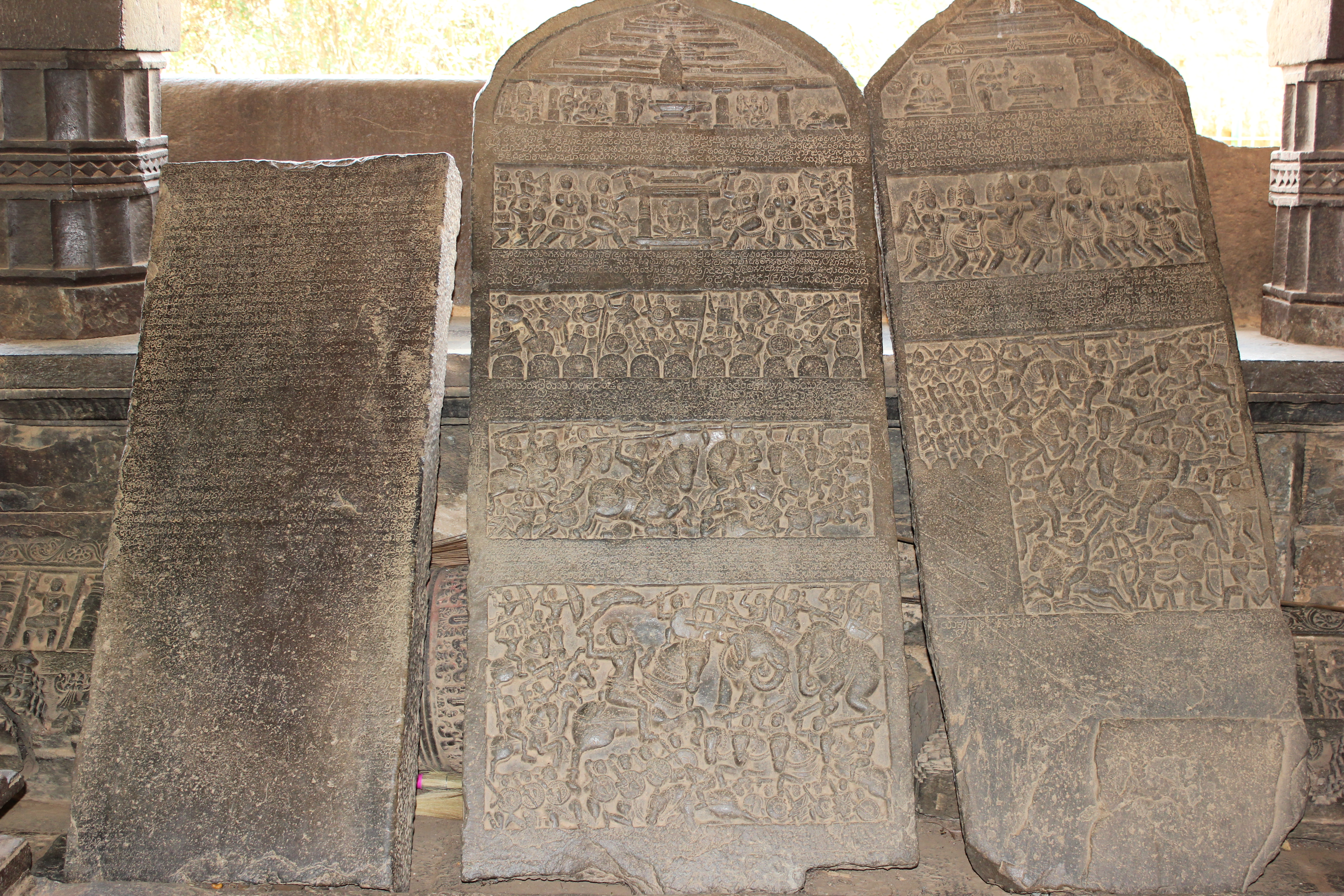
Three memorial stones

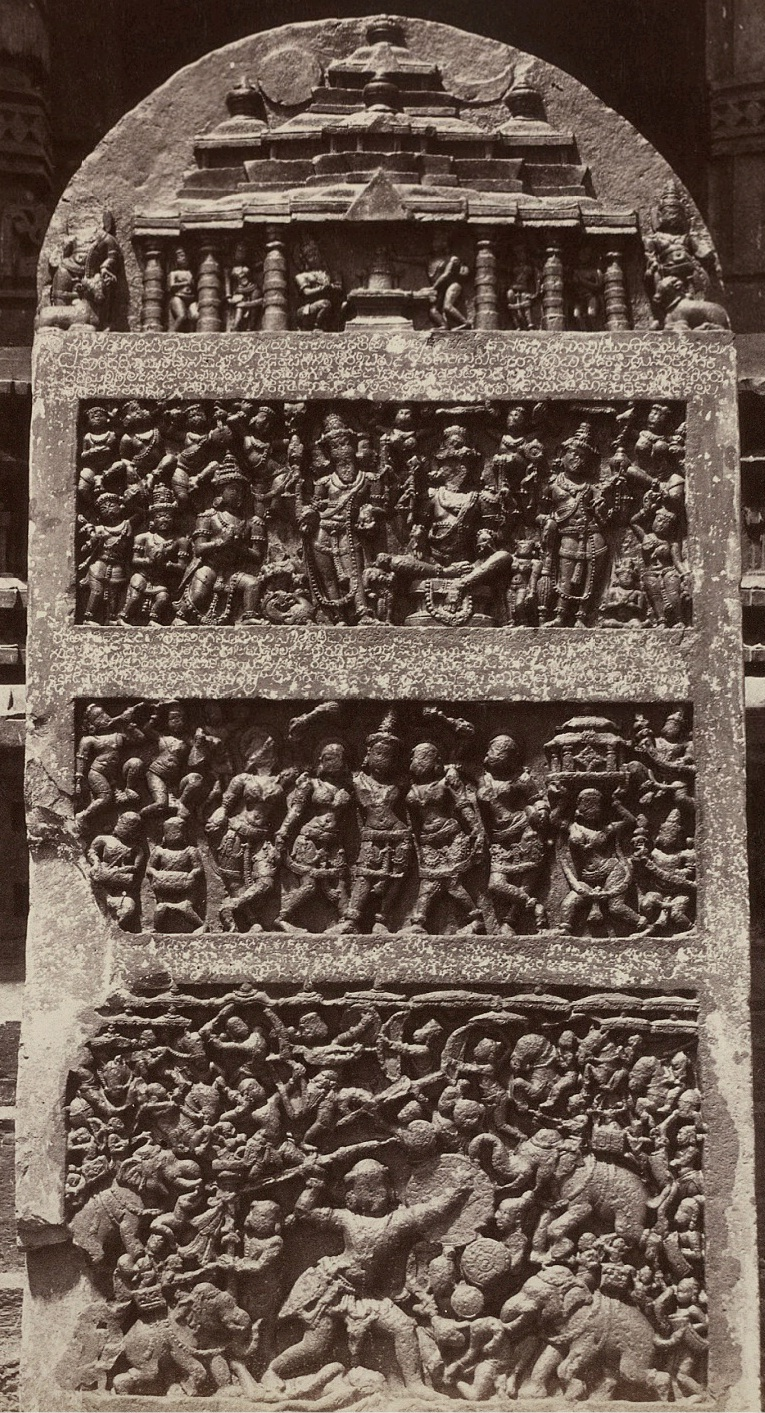
Hero stone

The temple complex has three memorial stones sculpted with religious and military scenes, located in front of the halls. It also has a 12th-century hero stone which shows contemporary battle weapons.
