= Taraknath temple =

Hindu temple dedicated to Lord Shiva in Tarakeswar, India

Taraknath Temple
- তারকনাথ মন্দির
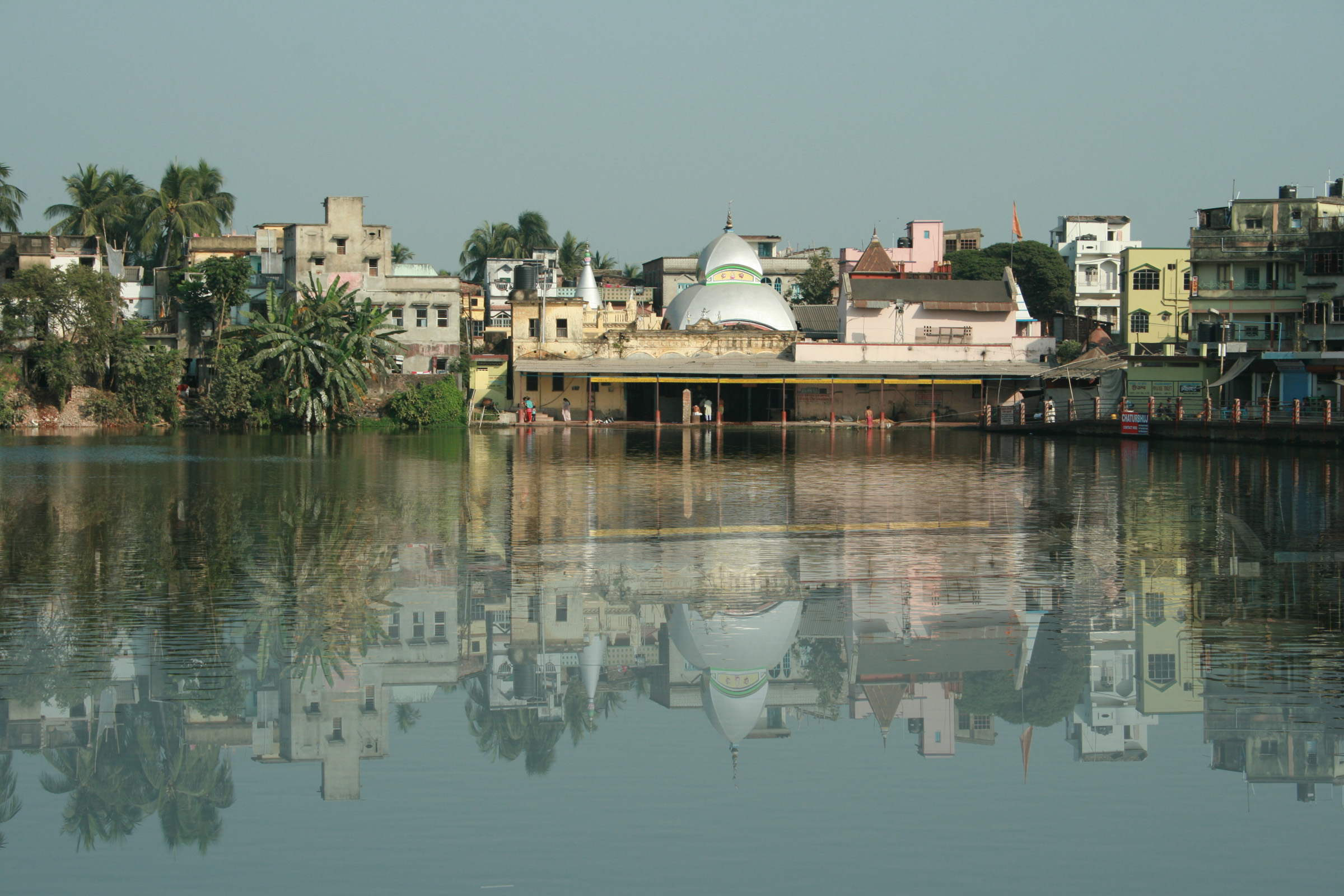
- Temple of Taraknath with Dudhpukur pond in the foreground, picture taken from Hanuman Ghat

- Location within West Bengal

Religion
- Affiliation: Hinduism
- District: Hooghly
- Deity: Shiva

Location
- Location: Tarakeswar
- State: West Bengal
- Country: India
- Coordinates: 22.8854°N 88.0176°E

Architecture
- Type: Hindu temple architecture
- Founder: Raja Bharamalla Rao

The Taraknath temple, dedicated to the Hindu god Shiva worshiped as Tarakanatha, is a major pilgrimage spot in the town of Tarakeswar, West Bengal, India.

== Legend ==
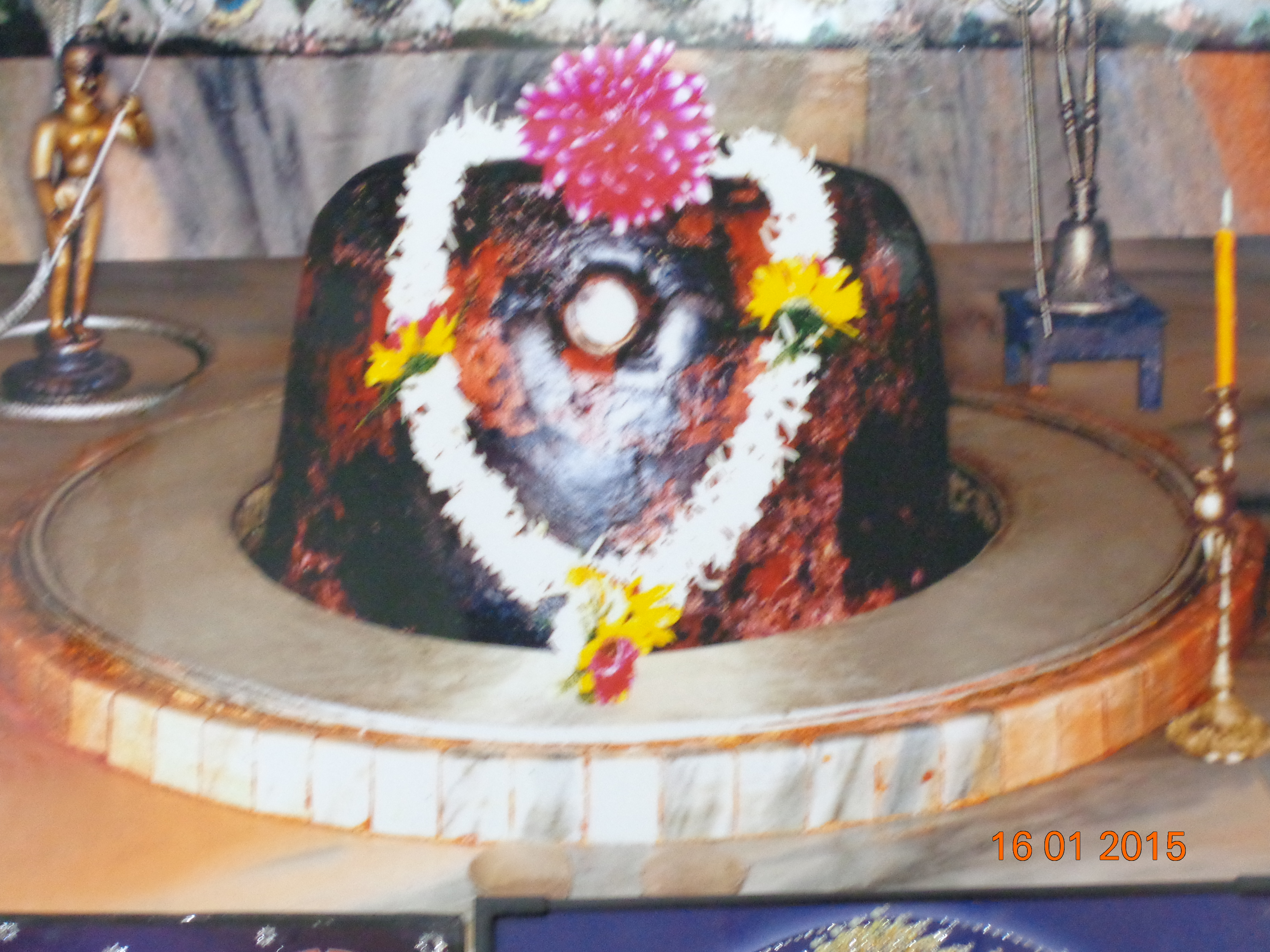
The Swayambhu Taraknath shivalinga enshrined within the temple

According to the prevailing oral legend, a local milkman named Mukunda Ghosh observed that one of his cows would spontaneously pour milk from its udders over a stone located within a dense forest, which on digging further was revealed to be Shivalinga. This news reached the local zamindar, Rao Bharamalla, a Rajput chieftain whose father Keshava Malla had migrated from Udaipur with his employer Man Singh following the Mughal conquest of Bengal. Bharamalla tried to dig out the Shivalinga from the ground but failed to find its roots. Later Lord Shiva appeared in his dreams, ordering him to build a temple on the spot.

== Temple ==
Close-up of the Taraknath temple

The original temple built by Bharamalla Rao is estimated to have been built in 1634, while the earliest dated reference to the temple in administrative records goes back to 1729. The present temple constructed in atchala style of Bengal temple architecture was constructed in 1739 by Govardhan Rakshit, zamindar of Karjana. It was renovated in 1744 by Maharaja Tilakchand Rai of Bardhaman and again in 1800 by Maharaja Tejchand Rai of Bardhaman. The main Shiva temple is located beside the temple pond named Dudhpukur, which was also excavated by Bharamalla, that was refurbished in 1854. The natmandir or congregational hall in front of the temple was constructed in 1874 by a devotee from Howrah. In addition, the temple premises also contain shrines dedicated to Kali and Vishnu. The temple is administered by a matha operated by monks belonging to the Giri subsect of Dashanami Sampradaya. Bengali Hindu pilgrims come from far and wide to this temple seeking cure for illness and infertility. Notable visitors of the temple include Sarada Devi and Paramahamsa Yogananda.

== Festivities ==
Pilgrims visit the temple throughout the year, especially on Mondays. But thousands of pilgrims visit Tarakeswar on the occasions of 'Shivaratri' and 'Gajan', the former taking place in Phalgun (Feb-March) while the latter lasts for five days ending on the sankranti in Chaitra (mid-April) according to the Bengali calendar. Large number of pilgrims from all over the state visit the temple in Sravana (mid-July to mid-August) as a part of the Kanwar yatra festivities.

== Incidents ==
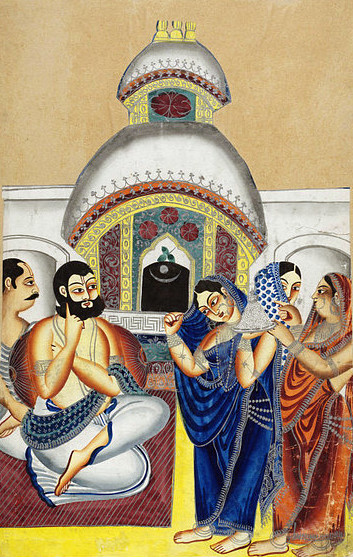
Kalighat painting depicting a scene from the 1874 Tarakeswar affair, with the temple and the shivalinga in background.

The mahants of the temple have a history of attracting controversy due to their abuse of power. In 1874, mahant Madhabchandra Giri was involved in a scandalous affair involving murder and sexual assault that saw him imprisoned. In 1924, mahant Satish Giri was accused of sexual misconduct after a female Marwari devotee lodged in the temple dharamshala committed suicide, that triggered protests against his financial mismanagement, extortion & patronage of prostitution. A satyagraha similar to the Akali movement occurring in Punjab was organised by 2 Punjabi Hindu sadhus Vishwananda and Sacchidananda with the help of the Mahavir Dal (a volunteer organisation affiliated with the Hindu Mahasabha) in cooperation with the state branch of the Indian National Congress under Chittaranjan Das, which led to Satish Giri's resignation.

== In popular culture ==
The fame of Taraknath temple has inspired the storyline in 2 Bengali films - Sri Sri Tarakeshwar (1958) which starred Jahor Roy and Kamal Mitra; & Baba Taraknath (1977) which starred Sandhya Ray and Biswajeet Chatterjee.
