= Tarakeshwara =

Form of the Hindu god Shiva in his role as a psychopomp

Tarakeshwara or Tarakeshvara (Sanskrit: तारकेश्वर, Tārakeśvara; Hindi: Tārkeśvar) is a form of the Hindu god Shiva in his role as a psychopomp, a ferryman or deliverer of the soul into freedom from rebirth (moksha).

== Temples ==
- Manikarnika Ghat, Benares
- Hangal, Karnataka
- Taraknath Temple, West Bengal

The temples are connected to the "Taraka", the "ferryboat mantra" or "mantra of the crossing" believed to guide the spirit of the dying to moksha. One Shivite form of the prayer is Om Sri Rama Jaya Rama Jaya Jaya Rama ("Om, Victory to God with his shakti, victory, victory to God"), supposedly taught by Shiva to his wife Parvati. Another is Rām-Rāmāya Namaḥ, taught by Yajnavalkya to Bharadvaja in the Ramottaratapaniya Upanishad. (Note: There are still other forms which vary according to sect and the god of the devotee.) Supposedly, one dying in the temple at Benares hears Shiva himself reciting one of these mantras.

== See also ==
- Shaivism
- Moksha
